= List of United States representatives in the 47th Congress =

This is a complete list of United States representatives during the 47th United States Congress listed by seniority.

As an historical article, the districts and party affiliations listed reflect those during the 47th Congress (March 4, 1881 – March 3, 1883). Seats and party affiliations on similar lists for other congresses will be different for certain members.

Seniority depends on the date on which members were sworn into office. Since many members are sworn in on the same day, subsequent ranking is based on previous congressional service of the individual and then by alphabetical order by the last name of the representative.

Committee chairmanship in the House is often associated with seniority. However, party leadership is typically not associated with seniority.

Note: The "*" indicates that the representative/delegate may have served one or more non-consecutive terms while in the House of Representatives of the United States Congress.

== U.S. House seniority list ==
U.S. House seniority
Rank	Representative	Party	District	Seniority date (Previous service, if any)	No.# of term(s)	Notes
1	William D. Kelley	R	PA-04	March 4, 1861	11th term	Dean of the House
2	Samuel J. Randall	D	PA-03	March 4, 1863	10th term	
3	Mark H. Dunnell	R	MN-01	March 4, 1871	6th term	Left the House in 1883.
4	William P. Frye	R	ME-02	March 4, 1871	6th term	Resigned on March 17, 1881.
5	Washington C. Whitthorne	D	TN-07	March 4, 1871	6th term	Left the House in 1883.
6	John DeWitt Clinton Atkins	D	TN-08	March 4, 1873; Previous service, 1857–1859.	6th term*	Left the House in 1883.
7	Richard P. Bland	D	MO-05	March 4, 1873	5th term	
8	James Henderson Blount	D	GA-06	March 4, 1873	5th term	
9	Aylett Hawes Buckner	G	MO-13	March 4, 1873	5th term	
10	Joseph Gurney Cannon	R	IL-14	March 4, 1873	5th term	
11	John Bullock Clark, Jr.	D	MO-11	March 4, 1873	5th term	Left the House in 1883.
12	Philip Cook	D	GA-03	March 4, 1873	5th term	Left the House in 1883.
13	Benjamin W. Harris	R	MA-02	March 4, 1873	5th term	Left the House in 1883.
14	Jay Abel Hubbell	R	MI-09	March 4, 1873	5th term	Left the House in 1883.
15	Roger Q. Mills	D	TX-04	March 4, 1873	5th term	
16	William Ralls Morrison	D	IL-17	March 4, 1873; Previous service, 1863–1865.	6th term*	
17	Charles O'Neill	R	PA-02	March 4, 1873; Previous service, 1863–1871.	10th term*	
18	Horace F. Page	R	CA-02	March 4, 1873	5th term	Left the House in 1883.
19	Abraham Herr Smith	R	PA-09	March 4, 1873	5th term	
20	Robert B. Vance	D	NC-08	March 4, 1873	5th term	
21	Charles G. Williams	R	WI-01	March 4, 1873	5th term	Left the House in 1883.
22	Samuel S. Cox	D	NY-06	November 4, 1873; Previous service, 1857–1865 and 1869–1873.	11th term**	
23	Alexander H. Stephens	D	GA-08	December 1, 1873; Previous service, 1843–1859.	13th term*	Resigned on November 4, 1882.
24	Thomas M. Gunter	D	AR-04	June 16, 1874	5th term	Left the House in 1883.
25	Joseph Clay Stiles Blackburn	D	KY-07	March 4, 1875	4th term	
26	Archibald M. Bliss	D	NY-04	March 4, 1875	4th term	Left the House in 1883.
27	George Cabell	D	VA-05	March 4, 1875	4th term	
28	Lucien B. Caswell	R	WI-02	March 4, 1875	4th term	Left the House in 1883.
29	David B. Culberson	D	TX-02	March 4, 1875	4th term	
30	George Gibbs Dibrell	D	TN-03	March 4, 1875	4th term	
31	E. John Ellis	D	LA-02	March 4, 1875	4th term	
32	William H. Forney	D	AL-07	March 4, 1875	4th term	
33	Randall L. Gibson	D	LA-01	March 4, 1875	4th term	Left the House in 1883.
34	Thomas J. Henderson	R	IL-06	March 4, 1875	4th term	
35	Charles E. Hooker	D	MS-05	March 4, 1875	4th term	Left the House in 1883.
36	John Ford House	D	TN-06	March 4, 1875	4th term	Left the House in 1883.
37	Charles Herbert Joyce	R	VT-01	March 4, 1875	4th term	Left the House in 1883.
38	J. Proctor Knott	D	KY-04	March 4, 1875; Previous service, 1867–1871.	6th term*	Left the House in 1883.
39	Elbridge G. Lapham	R	NY-27	March 4, 1875	4th term	Resigned on July 29, 1881.
40	Hernando Money	D	MS-03	March 4, 1875	4th term	
41	James Phelps	D	CT-02	March 4, 1875	4th term	Left the House in 1883.
42	John Henninger Reagan	D	TX-01	March 4, 1875; Previous service, 1857–1861.	6th term*	
43	Miles Ross	D	NJ-03	March 4, 1875	4th term	Left the House in 1883.
44	Alfred Moore Scales	D	NC-05	March 4, 1875; Previous service, 1857–1859.	5th term*	
45	Otho R. Singleton	D	MS-04	March 4, 1875; Previous service, 1853–1855 and 1857–1861.	8th term**	
46	William A.J. Sparks	D	IL-16	March 4, 1875	4th term	Left the House in 1883.
47	William McKendree Springer	D	IL-12	March 4, 1875	4th term	
48	John R. Tucker	D	VA-06	March 4, 1875	4th term	
49	Benjamin Wilson	D	WV-01	March 4, 1875	4th term	Left the House in 1883.
50	William W. Crapo	R	MA-01	November 2, 1875	4th term	Left the House in 1883.
51	John T. Wait	R	CT-03	April 12, 1876	4th term	
52	D. Wyatt Aiken	D	SC-03	March 4, 1877	3rd term	
53	William Aldrich	R	IL-01	March 4, 1877	3rd term	Left the House in 1883.
54	Thomas McKee Bayne	R	PA-23	March 4, 1877	3rd term	
55	Edward S. Bragg	D	WI-05	March 4, 1877	3rd term	Left the House in 1883.
56	James Frankland Briggs	R	NH-02	March 4, 1877	3rd term	Left the House in 1883.
57	Thomas M. Browne	R	IN-06	March 4, 1877	3rd term	
58	John W. Caldwell	D	KY-03	March 4, 1877	3rd term	Left the House in 1883.
59	William H. Calkins	R	IN-13	March 4, 1877	3rd term	
60	John H. Camp	R	NY-26	March 4, 1877	3rd term	Left the House in 1883.
61	John G. Carlisle	D	KY-06	March 4, 1877	3rd term	
62	James Ronald Chalmers	D	MS-06	March 4, 1877	3rd term	Resigned on April 29, 1882.
63	Thomas R. Cobb	D	IN-02	March 4, 1877	3rd term	
64	Jordan E. Cravens	D	AR-03	March 4, 1877	3rd term	Left the House in 1883.
65	Robert H. M. Davidson	D	FL-01	March 4, 1877	3rd term	
66	Nathaniel Cobb Deering	R	IA-04	March 4, 1877	3rd term	Left the House in 1883.
67	Jeremiah W. Dwight	R	NY-28	March 4, 1877	3rd term	Left the House in 1883.
68	Russell Errett	R	PA-22	March 4, 1877	3rd term	Left the House in 1883.
69	John H. Evins	D	SC-04	March 4, 1877	3rd term	
70	Alfred C. Harmer	R	PA-05	March 4, 1877; Previous service, 1871–1875.	5th term*	
71	Dudley C. Haskell	R	KS-02	March 4, 1877	3rd term	
72	George Cochrane Hazelton	R	WI-03	March 4, 1877	3rd term	Left the House in 1883.
73	Hilary A. Herbert	D	AL-02	March 4, 1877	3rd term	
74	Frank Hiscock	R	NY-25	March 4, 1877	3rd term	
75	Herman L. Humphrey	R	WI-07	March 4, 1877	3rd term	Left the House in 1883.
76	Joseph Jorgensen	R	VA-04	March 4, 1877	3rd term	Left the House in 1883.
77	Stephen Lindsey	R	ME-03	March 4, 1877	3rd term	Left the House in 1883.
78	J. Warren Keifer	R	OH-08	March 4, 1877	3rd term	Speaker of the House
79	John E. Kenna	D	WV-03	March 4, 1877	3rd term	Left the House in 1883.
80	John H. Ketcham	R	NY-13	March 4, 1877; Previous service, 1865–1873.	7th term*	
81	Van H. Manning	D	MS-02	March 4, 1877	3rd term	Left the House in 1883.
82	Benjamin F. Marsh	R	IL-10	March 4, 1877	3rd term	Left the House in 1883.
83	Anson G. McCook	R	NY-08	March 4, 1877	3rd term	Left the House in 1883.
84	James A. McKenzie	D	KY-02	March 4, 1877	3rd term	Left the House in 1883.
85	William McKinley	R	OH-17	March 4, 1877	3rd term	
86	Leopold Morse	D	MA-04	March 4, 1877	3rd term	
87	Henry L. Muldrow	D	MS-01	March 4, 1877	3rd term	
88	Henry S. Neal	R	OH-11	March 4, 1877	3rd term	Left the House in 1883.
89	Amasa Norcross	R	MA-10	March 4, 1877	3rd term	Left the House in 1883.
90	Thaddeus C. Pound	R	WI-08	March 4, 1877	3rd term	Left the House in 1883.
91	Thomas Brackett Reed	R	ME-01	March 4, 1877	3rd term	
92	William W. Rice	R	MA-09	March 4, 1877	3rd term	
93	Edward White Robertson	D	LA-06	March 4, 1877	3rd term	Left the House in 1883.
94	George D. Robinson	R	MA-11	March 4, 1877	3rd term	
95	Thomas Ryan	R	KS-03	March 4, 1877	3rd term	
96	William Shadrack Shallenberger	R	PA-24	March 4, 1877	3rd term	Left the House in 1883.
97	Charles M. Shelley	D	AL-04	March 4, 1877	3rd term	Resigned on July 20, 1882. Returned to the House on November 7, 1882.
98	Amos Townsend	R	OH-20	March 4, 1877	3rd term	Left the House in 1883.
99	Richard W. Townshend	D	IL-19	March 4, 1877	3rd term	
100	William Ward	R	PA-06	March 4, 1877	3rd term	Left the House in 1883.
101	Albert S. Willis	D	KY-05	March 4, 1877	3rd term	
102	Edwin Willits	R	MI-02	March 4, 1877	3rd term	Left the House in 1883.
103	Nelson W. Aldrich	R	RI-01	March 4, 1879	2nd term	Resigned on October 4, 1881.
104	John Alexander Anderson	R	KS-01	March 4, 1879	2nd term	
105	Robert Franklin Armfield	D	NC-07	March 4, 1879	2nd term	Left the House in 1883.
106	Gibson Atherton	D	OH-13	March 4, 1879	2nd term	Left the House in 1883.
107	James B. Belford	R	CO	March 4, 1879; Previous service, 1876–1877.	4th term*	
108	Frank Eckels Beltzhoover	D	PA-19	March 4, 1879	2nd term	Left the House in 1883.
109	Campbell Polson Berry	D	CA-03	March 4, 1879	2nd term	Left the House in 1883.
110	Henry H. Bingham	R	PA-01	March 4, 1879	2nd term	
111	Selwyn Z. Bowman	R	MA-05	March 4, 1879	2nd term	Left the House in 1883.
112	Julius C. Burrows	R	MI-04	March 4, 1879; Previous service, 1873–1875.	3rd term*	Left the House in 1883.
113	Benjamin Butterworth	R	OH-01	March 4, 1879	2nd term	Left the House in 1883.
114	Cyrus C. Carpenter	R	IA-09	March 4, 1879	2nd term	Left the House in 1883.
115	Martin L. Clardy	D	MO-01	March 4, 1879	2nd term	
116	Walpole G. Colerick	D	IN-12	March 4, 1879	2nd term	Left the House in 1883.
117	George L. Converse	D	OH-12	March 4, 1879	2nd term	
118	Richard Crowley	R	NY-31	March 4, 1879	2nd term	Left the House in 1883.
119	George R. Davis	R	IL-02	March 4, 1879	2nd term	
120	Lowndes Henry Davis	D	MO-04	March 4, 1879	2nd term	
121	Peter V. Deuster	D	WI-04	March 4, 1879	2nd term	
122	Poindexter Dunn	D	AR-01	March 4, 1879	2nd term	
123	Horatio Gates Fisher	R	PA-18	March 4, 1879	2nd term	Left the House in 1883.
124	Richard Graham Frost	D	MO-03	March 4, 1879	2nd term	Resigned on March 2, 1883.
125	Nicholas Ford	D	MO-09	March 4, 1879	2nd term	Left the House in 1883.
126	George W. Geddes	D	OH-14	March 4, 1879	2nd term	
127	William Godshalk	R	PA-07	March 4, 1879	2nd term	Left the House in 1883.
128	Joshua G. Hall	R	NH-01	March 4, 1879	2nd term	Left the House in 1883.
129	John Hammond	R	NY-18	March 4, 1879	2nd term	Left the House in 1883.
130	Nathaniel Job Hammond	D	GA-05	March 4, 1879	2nd term	
131	William H. Hatch	D	MO-12	March 4, 1879	2nd term	
132	Robert M. A. Hawk	R	IL-05	March 4, 1879	2nd term	Died on June 29, 1882.
133	William Heilman	R	IN-01	March 4, 1879	2nd term	Left the House in 1883.
134	Thomas H. Herndon	D	AL-01	March 4, 1879	2nd term	
135	Roswell G. Horr	R	MI-08	March 4, 1879	2nd term	
136	Leonidas C. Houk	R	TN-02	March 4, 1879	2nd term	
137	George W. Jones	G	TX-05	March 4, 1879	2nd term	Left the House in 1883.
138	J. Floyd King	D	LA-05	March 4, 1879	2nd term	
139	Robert Klotz	D	PA-11	March 4, 1879	2nd term	Left the House in 1883.
140	George W. Ladd	G	ME-04	March 4, 1879	2nd term	Left the House in 1883.
141	Benjamin Le Fevre	D	OH-05	March 4, 1879	2nd term	
142	Edward L. Martin	D	DE	March 4, 1879	2nd term	Left the House in 1883.
143	Joseph Mason	R	NY-24	March 4, 1879	2nd term	Left the House in 1883.
144	Moses A. McCoid	R	IA-01	March 4, 1879	2nd term	
145	Robert Milligan McLane	D	MD-04	March 4, 1879; Previous service, 1847–1851.	4th term*	Left the House in 1883.
146	Benton McMillin	D	TN-04	March 4, 1879	2nd term	
147	Frederick Miles	R	CT-04	March 4, 1879	2nd term	Left the House in 1883.
148	Warner Miller	R	NY-22	March 4, 1879	2nd term	Resigned on July 26, 1881.
149	Levi P. Morton	R	NY-11	March 4, 1879	2nd term	Resigned on March 21, 1881.
150	Thompson H. Murch	G	ME-05	March 4, 1879	2nd term	Left the House in 1883.
151	Godlove Stein Orth	R	IN-09	March 4, 1879; Previous service, 1863–1871 and 1873–1875.	7th term**	Died on December 16, 1882.
152	Elijah Phister	D	KY-10	March 4, 1879	2nd term	Left the House in 1883.
153	John S. Richardson	D	SC-01	March 4, 1879	2nd term	Left the House in 1883.
154	George M. Robeson	R	NJ-01	March 4, 1879	2nd term	Left the House in 1883.
155	William A. Russell	R	MA-07	March 4, 1879	2nd term	
156	Michael P. O'Connor	D	SC-02	March 4, 1879	2nd term	Died on April 26, 1881.
157	Romualdo Pacheco	R	CA-04	March 4, 1879; Previous service, 1877–1878.	3rd term*	Left the House in 1883.
158	Cyrus D. Prescott	R	NY-23	March 4, 1879	2nd term	Left the House in 1883.
159	David P. Richardson	R	NY-29	March 4, 1879	2nd term	Left the House in 1883.
160	John C. Sherwin	R	IL-04	March 4, 1879	2nd term	Left the House in 1883.
161	Charles Bryson Simonton	D	TN-09	March 4, 1879	2nd term	Left the House in 1883.
162	James W. Singleton	D	IL-11	March 4, 1879	2nd term	Left the House in 1883.
163	Emory Speer	D	GA-09	March 4, 1879	2nd term	Left the House in 1883.
164	Joshua Frederick Cockey Talbott	D	MD-02	March 4, 1879	2nd term	
165	John R. Thomas	R	IL-18	March 4, 1879	2nd term	
166	Philip B. Thompson, Jr.	D	KY-08	March 4, 1879	2nd term	
167	George D. Tillman	D	SC-05	March 4, 1879	2nd term	Resigned on June 19, 1882.
168	Oscar Turner	D	KY-01	March 4, 1879	2nd term	
169	James Manning Tyler	R	VT-02	March 4, 1879	2nd term	Left the House in 1883.
170	Thomas Updegraff	R	IA-03	March 4, 1879	2nd term	Left the House in 1883.
171	Jonathan T. Updegraff	R	OH-16	March 4, 1879	2nd term	Died on November 30, 1882.
172	Milton Urner	R	MD-06	March 4, 1879	2nd term	Left the House in 1883.
173	Edward K. Valentine	R	NE	March 4, 1879	2nd term	
174	Henry Van Aernam	R	NY-33	March 4, 1879; Previous service, 1865–1869.	4th term*	Left the House in 1883.
175	John Van Voorhis	R	NY-30	March 4, 1879	2nd term	Left the House in 1883.
176	William D. Washburn	R	MN-02	March 4, 1879	2nd term	
177	Olin Wellborn	D	TX-03	March 4, 1879	2nd term	
178	Thomas Williams	D	AL-05	March 4, 1879	2nd term	
179	Morgan Ringland Wise	D	PA-21	March 4, 1879	2nd term	Left the House in 1883.
180	Walter A. Wood	R	NY-17	March 4, 1879	2nd term	Left the House in 1883.
181	Thomas L. Young	R	OH-02	March 4, 1879	2nd term	Left the House in 1883.
182	Christopher C. Upson	D	TX-06	April 12, 1879	2nd term	Left the House in 1883.
183	Waldo Hutchins	D	NY-12	November 4, 1879	2nd term	
184	William George Thompson	R	IA-05	December 1, 1879	2nd term	Left the House in 1883.
185	Jonathan Scoville	D	NY-32	November 12, 1880	2nd term	Left the House in 1883.
186	Ezra B. Taylor	R	OH-19	December 13, 1880	2nd term	
187	Ossian Ray	R	NH-03	January 8, 1881	2nd term	
188	Thomas Allen	D	MO-02	March 4, 1881	1st term	Died on April 8, 1882.
189	John S. Barbour, Jr.	D	VA-08	March 4, 1881	1st term	
190	Samuel Fleming Barr	R	PA-14	March 4, 1881	1st term	
191	Lewis Beach	D	NY-14	March 4, 1881	1st term	
192	Perry Belmont	D	NY-01	March 4, 1881	1st term	
193	George Robinson Black	D	GA-01	March 4, 1881	1st term	Left the House in 1883.
194	Newton C. Blanchard	D	LA-04	March 4, 1881	1st term	
195	J. Hart Brewer	R	NJ-02	March 4, 1881	1st term	
196	Charles N. Brumm	G	PA-13	March 4, 1881	1st term	
197	Hugh Buchanan	D	GA-04	March 4, 1881	1st term	
198	John R. Buck	R	CT-01	March 4, 1881	1st term	Left the House in 1883.
199	Joseph Henry Burrows	D	MO-10	March 4, 1881	1st term	Left the House in 1883.
200	Jacob Miller Campbell	R	PA-17	March 4, 1881; Previous service, 1877–1879.	2nd term*	
201	John W. Candler	R	MA-08	March 4, 1881	1st term	Left the House in 1883.
202	George Williams Cassidy	D	NV	March 4, 1881	1st term	
203	Jonathan Chace	R	RI-02	March 4, 1881	1st term	
204	Andrew Grant Chapman	D	MD-05	March 4, 1881	1st term	Left the House in 1883.
205	Judson C. Clements	D	GA-07	March 4, 1881	1st term	
206	Thomas Cornell	R	NY-15	March 4, 1881; Previous service, 1867–1869.	2nd term*	Left the House in 1883.
207	William Ruffin Cox	D	NC-04	March 4, 1881	1st term	
208	George Washington Covington	D	MD-01	March 4, 1881	1st term	
209	William Cullen	R	IL-07	March 4, 1881	1st term	
210	Andrew Gregg Curtin	D	PA-20	March 4, 1881	1st term	
211	Marsena E. Cutts	R	IA-06	March 4, 1881	1st term	Resigned on March 3, 1883.
212	Chester Bidwell Darrall	R	LA-03	March 4, 1881; Previous service, 1869–1878.	6th term*	Left the House in 1883.
213	Rufus Dawes	R	OH-15	March 4, 1881	1st term	Left the House in 1883.
214	Mark L. De Motte	R	IN-10	March 4, 1881	1st term	Left the House in 1883.
215	John F. Dezendorf	R	VA-02	March 4, 1881	1st term	Left the House in 1883.
216	Clement Dowd	D	NC-06	March 4, 1881	1st term	
217	P. Henry Dugro	D	NY-07	March 4, 1881	1st term	Left the House in 1883.
218	Daniel Ermentrout	D	PA-08	March 4, 1881	1st term	
219	Charles B. Farwell	R	IL-03	March 4, 1881; Previous service, 1871–1876.	4th term*	Left the House in 1883.
220	Sewall S. Farwell	R	IA-02	March 4, 1881	1st term	Left the House in 1883.
221	Jesse J. Finley	D	FL-02	March 4, 1881; Previous service, 1876–1877 and 1879.	3rd term**	Resigned on June 1, 1882.
222	Abram Fulkerson	D	VA-09	March 4, 1881	1st term	Left the House in 1883.
223	George Tankard Garrison	D	VA-01	March 4, 1881	1st term	Left the House in 1883.
224	Melvin Clark George	R	OR	March 4, 1881	1st term	
225	William W. Grout	R	VT-03	March 4, 1881	1st term	Left the House in 1883.
226	Richard W. Guenther	R	WI-06	March 4, 1881	1st term	
227	Augustus Albert Hardenbergh	D	NJ-07	March 4, 1881; Previous service, 1875–1879.	3rd term*	Left the House in 1883.
228	Henry S. Harris	D	NJ-04	March 4, 1881	1st term	Left the House in 1883.
229	Ira S. Haseltine	G	MO-06	March 4, 1881	1st term	Left the House in 1883.
230	William Peters Hepburn	R	IA-08	March 4, 1881	1st term	
231	Abram Hewitt	D	NY-10	March 4, 1881; Previous service, 1875–1879.	3rd term*	
232	Goldsmith W. Hewitt	D	AL-06	March 4, 1881; Previous service, 1875–1879.	3rd term*	
233	John Hill	R	NJ-05	March 4, 1881; Previous service, 1867–1873.	4th term*	Left the House in 1883.
234	Fetter Schrier Hoblitzell	D	MD-03	March 4, 1881	1st term	
235	John B. Hoge	D	WV-02	March 4, 1881	1st term	Left the House in 1883.
236	William S. Holman	D	IN-04	March 4, 1881; Previous service, 1859–1865 and 1867–1877.	10th term**	
237	Orlando Hubbs	R	NC-02	March 4, 1881	1st term	Left the House in 1883.
238	Ferris Jacobs, Jr.	R	NY-21	March 4, 1881	1st term	Left the House in 1883.
239	Cornelius Comegys Jadwin	R	PA-15	March 4, 1881	1st term	Left the House in 1883.
240	James Kimbrough Jones	D	AR-02	March 4, 1881	1st term	
241	Phineas Jones	R	NJ-06	March 4, 1881	1st term	Left the House in 1883.
242	John A. Kasson	R	IA-07	March 4, 1881; Previous service, 1863–1867 and 1873–1877.	5th term**	
243	Edward S. Lacey	R	MI-03	March 4, 1881	1st term	
244	Louis C. Latham	D	NC-01	March 4, 1881	1st term	Left the House in 1883.
245	John P. Leedom	D	OH-07	March 4, 1881	1st term	Left the House in 1883.
246	John H. Lewis	R	IL-09	March 4, 1881	1st term	Left the House in 1883.
247	Henry W. Lord	R	MI-01	March 4, 1881	1st term	Left the House in 1883.
248	Courtland C. Matson	D	IN-05	March 4, 1881	1st term	
249	Addison S. McClure	R	OH-18	March 4, 1881	1st term	Left the House in 1883.
250	Samuel Henry Miller	R	PA-26	March 4, 1881	1st term	
251	William Robert Moore	R	TN-10	March 4, 1881	1st term	Left the House in 1883.
252	Henry Lee Morey	R	OH-03	March 4, 1881	1st term	
253	James Mosgrove	G	PA-25	March 4, 1881	1st term	Left the House in 1883.
254	Samuel W. Moulton	D	IL-15	March 4, 1881; Previous service, 1865–1867.	2nd term*	
255	William Mutchler	D	PA-10	March 4, 1881; Previous service, 1875–1877.	2nd term*	
256	Michael N. Nolan	D	NY-16	March 4, 1881	1st term	Left the House in 1883.
257	William C. Oates	D	AL-03	March 4, 1881	1st term	
258	Abraham X. Parker	R	NY-19	March 4, 1881	1st term	
259	John Paul	D	VA-07	March 4, 1881	1st term	
260	Lewis E. Payson	R	IL-08	March 4, 1881	1st term	
261	Stanton J. Peelle	R	IN-07	March 4, 1881	1st term	
262	Robert B. F. Peirce	R	IN-08	March 4, 1881	1st term	Left the House in 1883.
263	Augustus Herman Pettibone	R	TN-01	March 4, 1881	1st term	
264	Ambrose Ranney	R	MA-03	March 4, 1881	1st term	
265	John B. Rice	R	OH-10	March 4, 1881	1st term	Left the House in 1883.
266	Theron Moses Rice	G	MO-07	March 4, 1881	1st term	Left the House in 1883.
267	James M. Ritchie	R	OH-06	March 4, 1881	1st term	Left the House in 1883.
268	James S. Robinson	R	OH-09	March 4, 1881	1st term	
269	William Erigena Robinson	D	NY-02	March 4, 1881; Previous service, 1867–1869.	2nd term*	
270	William Rosecrans	D	CA-01	March 4, 1881	1st term	
271	Joseph A. Scranton	R	PA-12	March 4, 1881	1st term	Left the House in 1883.
272	John Williams Shackelford	D	NC-03	March 4, 1881	1st term	Died on January 18, 1883.
273	Emanuel Shultz	R	OH-04	March 4, 1881	1st term	Left the House in 1883.
274	Dietrich C. Smith	R	IL-13	March 4, 1881	1st term	Left the House in 1883.
275	J. Hyatt Smith	D	NY-03	March 4, 1881	1st term	Left the House in 1883.
276	Oliver L. Spaulding	R	MI-06	March 4, 1881	1st term	Left the House in 1883.
277	George Washington Steele	R	IN-11	March 4, 1881	1st term	
278	Strother M. Stockslager	D	IN-03	March 4, 1881	1st term	
279	Eben F. Stone	R	MA-06	March 4, 1881	1st term	
280	Horace B. Strait	R	MN-03	March 4, 1881; Previous service, 1873–1879.	4th term*	
281	Henry G. Turner	D	GA-02	March 4, 1881	1st term	
282	Robert T. Van Horn	R	MO-08	March 4, 1881; Previous service, 1865–1871.	4th term*	Left the House in 1883.
283	Robert Jarvis Cochran Walker	R	PA-16	March 4, 1881	1st term	Left the House in 1883.
284	Richard Warner	D	TN-05	March 4, 1881	1st term	
285	Lewis Findlay Watson	R	PA-27	March 4, 1881; Previous service, 1877–1879.	2nd term*	Left the House in 1883.
286	George W. Webber	R	MI-05	March 4, 1881	1st term	Left the House in 1883.
287	Joseph Wheeler	D	AL-08	March 4, 1881	1st term	Resigned on June 3, 1882. Returned to the House on January 15, 1883. Left the House in 1883.
288	John D. White	R	KY-09	March 4, 1881; Previous service, 1875–1877.	2nd term*	
289	George West	R	NY-20	March 4, 1881	1st term	Left the House in 1883.
290	George D. Wise	D	VA-03	March 4, 1881	1st term	
291	Benjamin Wood	D	NY-05	March 4, 1881; Previous service, 1861–1865.	3rd term*	Left the House in 1883.
	John T. Rich	R	MI-07	April 5, 1881	1st term	Left the House in 1883.
	Samuel Dibble	D	SC-02	June 9, 1881	1st term	Resigned on May 31, 1882.
	Nelson Dingley, Jr.	R	ME-02	September 12, 1881	1st term	
	Roswell P. Flower	D	NY-11	November 8, 1881	1st term	Left the House in 1883.
	Charles R. Skinner	R	NY-22	November 8, 1881	1st term	
	James Wolcott Wadsworth	R	NY-27	November 8, 1881	1st term	
	John Hardy	D	NY-09	December 5, 1881	1st term	
	Henry J. Spooner	R	RI-01	December 5, 1881	1st term	
	John R. Lynch	R	MS-06	April 29, 1882; Previous service, 1873–1877.	3rd term*	Left the House in 1883.
	Edmund William McGregor Mackey	R	SC-02	May 31, 1882; Previous service, 1875–1876.	2nd term*	
	Horatio Bisbee, Jr.	R	FL-02	June 1, 1882; Previous service, 1877–1879 and 1881.	3rd term**	
	William M. Lowe	G	AL-09	June 3, 1882; Previous service, 1879–1881.	2nd term*	Died on October 12, 1882.
	Robert Smalls	R	SC-05	July 19, 1882; Previous service, 1875–1879.	3rd term*	Left the House in 1883.
	Robert R. Hitt	R	IL-05	December 4, 1882	1st term	
	Seaborn Reese	D	GA-08	December 4, 1882	1st term	
	James Henry McLean	R	MO-02	December 15, 1882	1st term	Left the House in 1883.
	Joseph D. Taylor	R	OH-16	January 2, 1883	1st term	
	Charles T. Doxey	R	IN-09	January 17, 1883	1st term	Left the House in 1883.
	Gustavus Sessinghaus	R	MO-03	March 2, 1883	1st term	Left the House in 1883.
	John C. Cook	D	IA-06	March 3, 1883	1st term	Left the House in 1883.

== Delegates ==
Rank	Delegate	Party	District	Seniority date (Previous service, if any)	No.# of term(s)	Notes
1	Martin Maginnis	D	MT	March 4, 1873	5th term	
2	George Ainslie	D	ID	March 4, 1879	2nd term	
3	Thomas Hurley Brents	R	WA	March 4, 1879	2nd term	
4	Tranquilino Luna	R	NM	March 4, 1881	1st term	
5	Granville Henderson Oury	D	AZ	March 4, 1881	1st term	
6	Richard F. Pettigrew	R	DAK	March 4, 1881	1st term	
7	Morton Everel Post	D	WY	March 4, 1881	1st term	
	John Thomas Caine	D	UT	November 7, 1882	1st term	

== See also ==
- 47th United States Congress
- List of United States congressional districts
- List of United States senators in the 47th Congress
