= List of United States senators in the 47th Congress =

This is a complete list of United States senators during the 47th United States Congress listed by seniority from March 4, 1881, to March 3, 1883.

Order of service is based on the commencement of the senator's first term. Behind this is former service as a senator (only giving the senator seniority within their new incoming class), service as vice president, a House member, a cabinet secretary, or a governor of a state. The final factor is the population of the senator's state.

Senators who were sworn in during the middle of the Congress (up until the last senator who was not sworn in early after winning the November 1882 election) are listed at the end of the list with no number.

== Terms of service ==
Class	Terms of service of senators that expired in years
Class 2	Terms of service of senators that expired in 1883 (AL, AR, CO, DE, GA, IA, IL, KS, KY, LA, MA, ME, MI, MN, MS, NC, NE, NH, NJ, OR, RI, SC, TN, TX, VA, and WV.)
Class 3	Terms of service of senators that expired in 1885 (AL, AR, CA, CO, CT, FL, GA, IA, IL, IN, KS, KY, LA, MD, MO, NC, NH, NV, NY, OH, OR, PA, SC, VT, and WI.)
Class 1	Terms of service of senators that expired in 1887 (CA, CT, DE, FL, IN, MA, MD, ME, MI, MN, MO, MS, NE, NJ, NV, NY, OH, PA, RI, TN, TX, VA, VT, WI, and WV.)

== U.S. Senate seniority list ==
U.S. Senate seniority
Rank	Senator (party-state)	Seniority date	Other factors
1	Henry B. Anthony (R-RI)	March 4, 1859	Former governor
2	George F. Edmunds (R-VT)	April 3, 1866	
3	Roscoe Conkling (R-NY)	March 4, 1867	
4	Justin Smith Morrill (R-VT)	March 4, 1867	
5	Thomas F. Bayard (D-DE)	March 4, 1869	
6	Eli Saulsbury (D-DE)	March 4, 1871	
7	Thomas W. Ferry (R-MI)	March 4, 1871	Former representative
8	William Windom (R-MN)	March 4, 1871	Former representative
9	Henry G. Davis (D-WV)	March 4, 1871	
10	John W. Johnston (D-VA)	March 15, 1871	
11	Matt W. Ransom (D-NC)	January 30, 1872	
12	William B. Allison (R-IA)	March 4, 1873	Former representative
13	John J. Ingalls (R-KS)	March 4, 1873	
14	John P. Jones (R-NV)	March 4, 1873	
15	Francis Cockrell (D-MO)	March 4, 1875	
16	Henry L. Dawes (R-MA)	March 4, 1875	
17	Charles W. Jones (D-FL)	March 4, 1875	
18	Samuel J. R. McMillan (R-MN)	March 4, 1875	
19	Samuel B. Maxey (D-TX)	March 4, 1875	
20	Ambrose Burnside (R-RI)	March 4, 1875	Former governor
21	James G. Blaine (R-ME)	July 10, 1876	Former representative
22	Henry M. Teller (R-CO)	November 15, 1876	
23	George F. Hoar (R-MA)	March 4, 1877	Former representative
24	Isham G. Harris (D-TN)	March 4, 1877	Former governor
25	John Tyler Morgan (D-AL)	March 4, 1877	
26	John R. McPherson (D-NJ)	March 4, 1877	
27	Matthew Butler (D-SC)	March 4, 1877	
28	Richard Coke (D-TX)	March 4, 1877	
29	Preston B. Plumb (R-KS)	March 4, 1877	
30	James B. Beck (D-KY)	March 4, 1877	
31	Lucius Q. C. Lamar (D-MS)	March 4, 1877	
32	Augustus H. Garland (D-AR)	March 4, 1877	
33	Benjamin H. Hill (D-GA)	March 4, 1877	
34	David Davis (I-IL)	March 4, 1877	
35	Samuel J. Kirkwood (R-IA)	March 4, 1877	
36	Alvin Saunders (R-NE)	March 4, 1877	
37	Edward H. Rollins (R-NH)	March 4, 1877	
38	La Fayette Grover (D-OR)	March 4, 1877	Former governor
39	J. Donald Cameron (R-PA)	March 20, 1877	
40	Daniel W. Voorhees (D-IN)	November 6, 1877	
41	George G. Vest (D-MO)	March 4, 1879	Missouri 5th in population (1870)
42	Orville H. Platt (R-CT)	March 4, 1879	Connecticut 25th in population (1870)
43	Wilkinson Call (D-FL)	March 4, 1879	Florida 33rd in population (1870)
44	Zebulon Baird Vance (D-NC)	March 4, 1879	
45	Wade Hampton III (R-SC)	March 4, 1879	
46	John A. Logan (R-IL)	March 4, 1879	
47	James D. Walker (D-AR)	March 4, 1879	
48	James T. Farley (D-CA)	March 4, 1879	
49	Nathaniel P. Hill (R-CO)	March 4, 1879	
50	John S. Williams (D-KY)	March 4, 1879	
51	Benjamin F. Jonas (D-LA)	March 4, 1879	
52	George H. Pendleton (D-OH)	March 4, 1879	Former representative
53	James H. Slater (D-OR)	March 4, 1879	Former representative
54	James B. Groome (D-MD)	March 4, 1879	Former governor
55	Henry W. Blair (R-NH)	June 18, 1879	Former representative
56	Joseph E. Brown (D-GA)	May 26, 1880	
57	James L. Pugh (D-AL)	November 24, 1880	
58	John Sherman (R-OH)	March 4, 1881	Previously a senator
59	Eugene Hale (R-ME)	March 4, 1881	Former representative (10 years)
60	Joseph Hawley (R-CT)	March 4, 1881	Former representative (5 years)
61	James Z. George (D-MS)	March 4, 1881	Mississippi 18th in population (1880)
62	Arthur P. Gorman (D-MD)	March 4, 1881	Maryland 20th in population (1880)
63	Philetus Sawyer (R-WI)	March 4, 1881	
64	Benjamin Harrison (R-IN)	March 4, 1881	
65	Omar D. Conger (R-MI)	March 4, 1881	
66	John F. Miller (R-CA)	March 4, 1881	
67	Charles Van Wyck (R-NE)	March 4, 1881	
68	James G. Fair (D-NV)	March 4, 1881	
69	William J. Sewell (R-NJ)	March 4, 1881	
70	John I. Mitchell (R-PA)	March 4, 1881	
71	William Mahone (RA-VA)	March 4, 1881	
72	Howell E. Jackson (D-TN)	March 4, 1881	
73	Thomas C. Platt (R-NY)	March 4, 1881	
	James W. McDill (R-IA)	March 8, 1881	
	Alonzo J. Edgerton (R-MN)	March 12, 1881	
	Angus Cameron (R-WI)	March 14, 1881	
	William P. Frye (R-ME)	March 18, 1881	
	Warner Miller (R-NY)	July 27, 1881	
	Elbridge G. Lapham (R-NY)	August 2, 1881	
	Nelson Aldrich (R-RI)	October 5, 1881	
	William Windom (R-MN)	November 15, 1881	Former representative
	George M. Chilcott (R-CO)	April 17, 1882	
	Middleton P. Barrow (D-GA)	November 15, 1882	
	Horace Tabor (R-CO)	January 27, 1883	

== See also ==
- 47th United States Congress
- List of United States representatives in the 47th Congress
