= 47th United States Congress =

1881-1883 U.S. Congress

←	46th	48th	→
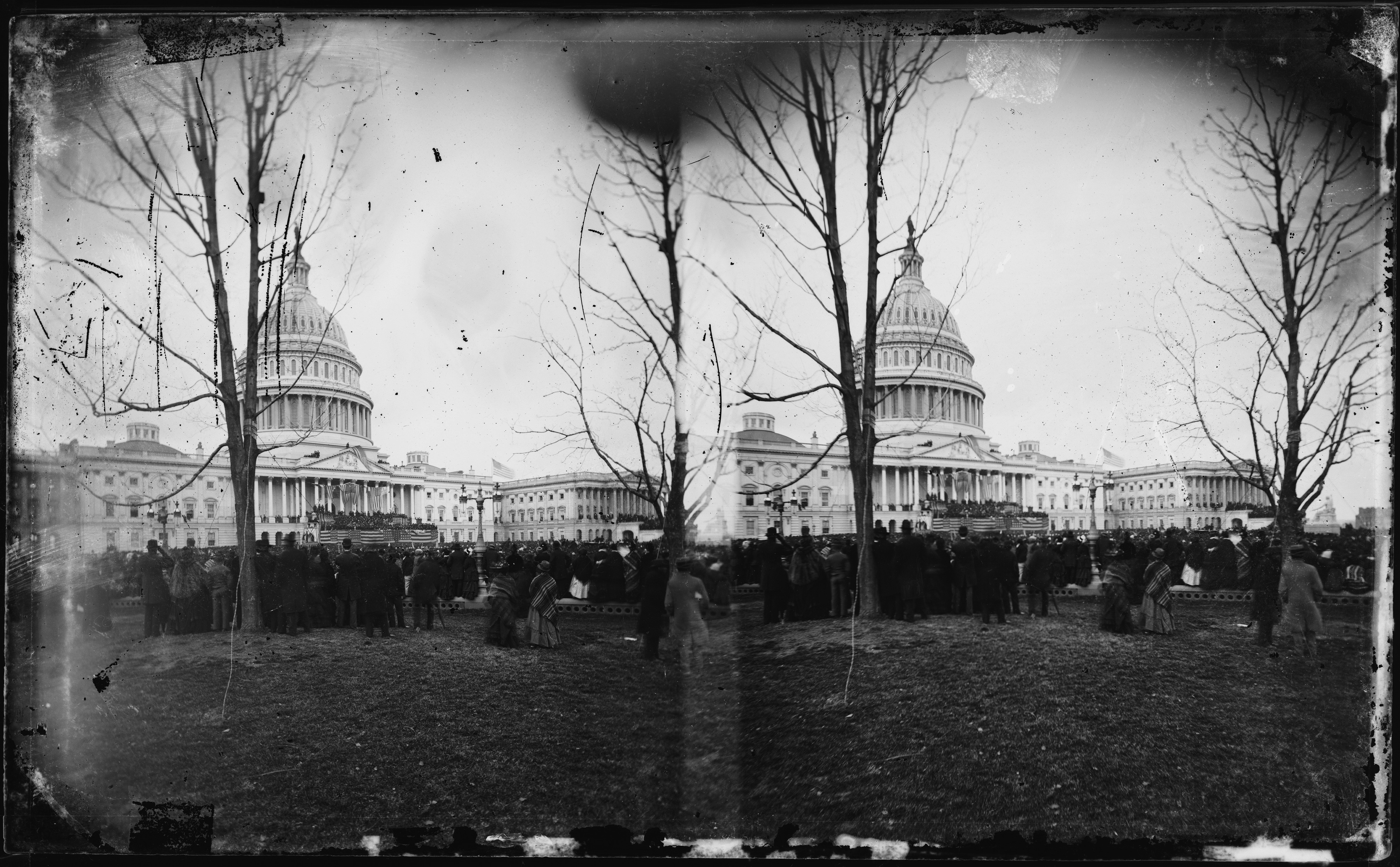
- United States Capitol (1877)

Overview
- Legislative body: United States Congress
- Jurisdiction: United States
- Term: March 4, 1881 – March 4, 1883

Senate
- Members: 76
- President: Chester A. Arthur (R) (until September 19, 1881); Vacant (from September 19, 1881)
- President pro tempore: Thomas F. Bayard (D); David Davis (I); George F. Edmunds (R)
- Party control: Republican (with caucus and tie-breaking VP) for first special session, then Split for remaining sessions

House of Representatives
- Members: 293 representatives 8 non-voting delegates
- Speaker: J. Warren Keifer (R)
- Party control: Republican (plurality; became majority in middle of first Congressional session)

Sessions
- Special (Note: Special session of the Senate.): March 4, 1881 – May 20, 1881
- Special (Note: Special session of the Senate.): October 10, 1881 – October 29, 1881
- 1st: December 5, 1881 – August 8, 1882
- 2nd: December 4, 1882 – March 3, 1883

The 47th United States Congress was a meeting of the legislative branch of the United States federal government, consisting of the United States Senate and the United States House of Representatives. It met in Washington, D.C. from March 4, 1881, to March 4, 1883, during the six months of James Garfield's presidency, and the first year and a half of Chester Arthur's presidency. The apportionment of seats in this House of Representatives was based on the 1870 United States census. The House had a Republican majority; the Senate was evenly divided for the first time ever, with no vice president to break ties for most of this term.

== Party summary ==
The count below identifies party affiliations at the beginning of the first session of this Congress, and includes members from vacancies and newly admitted states, when they were first seated. Changes resulting from subsequent replacements are shown below in the "Changes in membership" section.

=== Senate ===
	Party (Shading indicates party control)				Total	
	Democratic (D)	Independent (I)	Readjuster (RA)	Republican (R)	Total	Vacant
End of previous Congress	42	1	0	32	75	1
Begin	37	1	1	36	75	1
March 5, 1881 (Note: In Maine: James G. Blaine (R) resigned to become Secretary of State.)	37	1	1	35	74	2
March 7, 1881 (Note: In Iowa: Samuel J. Kirkwood (R) resigned to become Secretary of the Interior. In Minnesota: William Windom (R) resigned to become Secretary of the Treasury.)	37	1	1	33	72	4
March 8, 1881 (Note: In Iowa: James W. McDill (R) was appointed to finish Samuel J. Kirkwood's term.)	37	1	1	34	73	3
March 12, 1881 (Note: In Minnesota: Alonzo J. Edgerton (R) was appointed to finish William Windom's term.)	37	1	1	35	74	2
March 14, 1881 (Note: In Wisconsin: Angus Cameron (R) was elected to finish the term of Matthew H. Carpenter (R), who had died the previous month.)	37	1	1	36	75	1
March 18, 1881 (Note: In Maine: William P. Frye (R) was elected to finish James G. Blaine's term.)	37	1	1 (Note: William Mahone caucused with Republicans beginning on March 14, 1881. Vice President Chester A. Arthur (R) held the tie-breaking vote.)	37	76	0
May 16, 1881 (Note: In New York: Roscoe Conkling (R) and Thomas C. Platt (R) resigned as a protest against federal patronage appointments made in New York.)	37	1	1	35	74	2
July 27, 1881 (Note: In New York: Warner Miller (R) was elected to finish the term of Thomas C. Platt (R).)	37	1	1	36	75	1
August 2, 1881 (Note: In New York: Elbridge G. Lapham (R) was elected to finish the term of Roscoe Conkling (R).)	37	1	1	37	76	0
September 13, 1881 (Note: In Rhode Island: Ambrose Burnside (R) died.)	37	1	1	36	75	1
October 5, 1881 (Note: In Rhode Island: Nelson W. Aldrich (R) was elected to finish Ambrose Burnside's term. With Arthur having assumed the Presidency after James A. Garfield's assassination, there was no tie-breaking vote. Independent David Davis was elected president pro tempore and both parties agreed to perpetuate the organizational status quo. Leadership of the Senate committees remained in Republican hands, while the Democrats continued to control the offices of Secretary and Sergeant at Arms.)	37	1 (Note: Independent David Davis did not caucus with the Republicans, but was elected president pro tempore in a compromise that allowed Republican control of the committees.)	1	37	76	0
November 15, 1881 (Note: In Minnesota: William Windom (R) was elected to succeed interim appointee Alonzo J. Edgerton (R).)	37	1	1	37	76	0
April 17, 1882 (Note: In Colorado: Henry M. Teller (R) resigned to become Secretary of the Interior. His successor, George M. Chilcott (R), was seated the same day.)	37	1	1	37	76	0
August 16, 1882 (Note: In Georgia: Benjamin Harvey Hill (D) died.)	36	1	1	37	75	1
November 15, 1882 (Note: In Georgia: Middleton P. Barrow (D) was elected to finish the term of Benjamin Harvey Hill (D).)	37	1	1	37	76	0
January 27, 1883 (Note: In Colorado: Horace Tabor (R) was elected to succeed interim appointee George M. Chilcott (R).)	37	1	1	37	76	0
Final voting share	48.7%	1.3%	1.3%	48.7%		
Beginning of the next Congress	36	0	2	38	76	0

=== House of Representatives ===
	Party (Shading indicates party control)						Total	
	Democratic (D)	Independent Democrat (ID)	Independent (I)	Greenback (GB)	Independent Republican (IR)	Republican (R)	Total	Vacant
End of previous Congress	146	4	1	11	0	129	291	2
Begin	134	1	1	9	0	146	291	2
March 17, 1881 (Note: In Maine's 2nd district: William P. Frye (R) resigned when he was elected to the U.S. Senate.)	134	1	1	9	0	145	290	3
March 21, 1881 (Note: In New York's 11th district: Levi P. Morton (R) resigned when he was appointed U.S. Minister to France.)	134	1	1	9	0	144	289	4
April 5, 1881 (Note: In Michigan's 7th district: John T. Rich (R) was elected to replace Omar D. Conger (R). Conger had been reelected in 1880 but did not take his seat because he had been elected to the U.S. Senate.)	134	1	1	9	0	145	290	3
April 26, 1881 (Note: In South Carolina's 2nd district: Michael P. O'Connor (D) died. He had been seated at the opening of Congress, but his election was still being contested when he died.)	133	1	1	9	0	145	289	4
June 9, 1881 (Note: In South Carolina's 2nd district: Samuel Dibble (D) was elected to fill the vacancy created by the death of Michael P. O'Connor (D). The seat was the subject of an election contest, which was eventually resolved in favor of the Republican, Edmund W. M. Mackey, meaning that this vacancy never properly existed.)	134	1	1	9	0	145	290	3
July 26, 1881 (Note: In New York's 22nd district: Warner Miller (R) resigned when he was elected to the U.S. Senate.)	134	1	1	9	0	144	289	4
July 29, 1881 (Note: In New York's 27th district: Elbridge G. Lapham (R) resigned when he was elected to the U.S. Senate.)	134	1	1	9	0	143	288	5
September 12, 1881 (Note: In Maine's 2nd district: Samuel Dibble (R) was elected to fill the vacancy created when William P. Frye (R) resigned to enter the U.S. Senate.)	134	1	1	9	0	144	289	4
October 5, 1881 (Note: In Rhode Island's 1st district: Nelson W. Aldrich (R) resigned when he was elected to the U.S. Senate.)	134	1	1	9	0	143	288	5
November 8, 1881 (Note: In New York's 11th district: Roswell P. Flower (D) was elected to fill the vacancy created when Levi P. Morton (R) resigned to become U.S. Minister to France. In New York's 22nd district: Charles R. Skinner (R) was elected to fill the vacancy created when Warner Miller (R) resigned to enter the U.S. Senate. In New York's 27th district: James Wolcott Wadsworth (R) was elected to fill the vacancy created when Elbridge G. Lapham (R) resigned to enter the U.S. Senate.)	135	1	1	9	0	145	291	2
December 5, 1881 (Note: In New York's 9th district: John Hardy (D) was elected to fill the vacancy created when Fernando Wood (D) died before Congress convened. In Rhode Island's 1st district: Charles R. Skinner (R) was elected to fill the vacancy created when Nelson W. Aldrich (R) resigned to enter the U.S. Senate.)	136	1	1	9	0	146	293	0
April 8, 1882 (Note: In Missouri's 2nd district: Thomas Allen (D) died.)	135	1	1	9	0	146	292	1
April 29, 1882 (Note: In Mississippi's 6th district: James Ronald Chalmers (D) had been seated pending the resolution of an election dispute, which the House now decided in favor of his opponent, John R. Lynch (R).)	134	1	1	9	0	147	292	1
May 31, 1882 (Note: In South Carolina's 2nd district: Samuel Dibble (D) had been seated pending the resolution of an election dispute, which the House now decided in favor of his opponent, Edmund W. M. Mackey (IR).)	133	1	1	9	1	147	292	1
June 1, 1882 (Note: In Florida's 2nd district: Jesse J. Finley (D) had been seated pending the resolution of an election dispute, which the House now decided in favor of his opponent, Horatio Bisbee Jr. (R).)	132	1	1	9	1	148	292	1
June 3, 1882 (Note: In Alabama's 8th district: Joseph Wheeler (D) had been seated pending the resolution of an election dispute, which the House now decided in favor of his opponent, William M. Lowe (G).)	131	1	1	10	1	148	292	1
June 29, 1882 (Note: In Illinois's 5th district: Robert M. A. Hawk (R) died.)	131	1	1	10	1	147	291	2
July 19, 1882 (Note: In South Carolina's 5th district: George D. Tillman (D) had been seated pending the resolution of an election dispute, which the House now decided in favor of his opponent, Robert Smalls (R).)	130	1	1	10	1	148	291	2
July 20, 1882 (Note: In South Carolina's 5th district: Charles M. Shelley (D) had been seated pending the resolution of an election dispute, which the House now declared vacant and called for a new election.)	129	1	1	10	1	148	290	3
October 12, 1882 (Note: In Alabama's 8th district: William M. Lowe (G) died.)	129	1	1	9	1	148	289	4
November 4, 1882 (Note: In Georgia's 8th district: Alexander H. Stephens (D) resigned when he was elected Governor of Georgia.)	128	1	1	9	1	148	288	5
November 7, 1882 (Note: In Illinois's 5th district: Robert R. Hitt (R) was elected to fill the vacancy created when Robert M. A. Hawk (R) died. In South Carolina's 5th district: Charles M. Shelley (D) was elected to fill the vacancy created when the house voided his previous election.)	129	1	1	9	1	149	290	3
November 30, 1882 (Note: In Ohio's 16th district: Jonathan T. Updegraff (R) died.)	129	1	1	9	1	148	289	4
December 4, 1882 (Note: In Georgia's 8th district: Seaborn Reese (D) was elected to fill the vacancy created when Alexander H. Stephens (D) was elected Governor of Georgia.)	130	1	1	9	1	148	290	3
December 15, 1882 (Note: In Missouri's 2nd district: James Henry McLean (R) was elected to fill the vacancy created when Thomas Allen (D) died.)	130	1	1	9	1	149	291	2
December 16, 1882 (Note: In Indiana's 9th district: Godlove Stein Orth (R) died.)	130	1	1	9	1	148	290	3
January 2, 1883 (Note: In Ohio's 16th district: Joseph D. Taylor (R) was elected to fill the vacancy created when Jonathan T. Updegraff (R) died.)	130	1	1	9	1	149	291	2
January 15, 1883 (Note: In Alabama's 8th district: Joseph Wheeler (D) was elected to fill the vacancy created when William M. Lowe (G) died.)	131	1	1	9	1	149	292	1
January 17, 1883 (Note: In Indiana's 9th district: Charles T. Doxey (R) was elected to fill the vacancy created when Godlove Stein Orth (R) died.)	131	1	1	9	1	150	293	0
January 18, 1883 (Note: In North Carolina's 3rd district: John Williams Shackelford (D) died.)	130	1	1	9	1	150	292	1
March 2, 1883 (Note: In Missouri's 3rd district: Richard Graham Frost (D) had been seated pending the resolution of an election dispute, which the House now decided in favor of his opponent, Gustavus Sessinghaus] (R).)	129	1	1	9	1	151	292	1
March 3, 1883 (Note: In Iowa's 6th district: Marsena E. Cutts (R) had been seated pending the resolution of an election dispute, which the House now decided in favor of his opponent, John C. Cook] (D).)	130	1	1	9	1	150	292	1
Final voting share	44.5%	0.3%	0.3%	3.1%	0.3%	51.4%		
Beginning of the next Congress	196	3	6	2	1	117	325	1

== Leadership ==
=== Senate ===
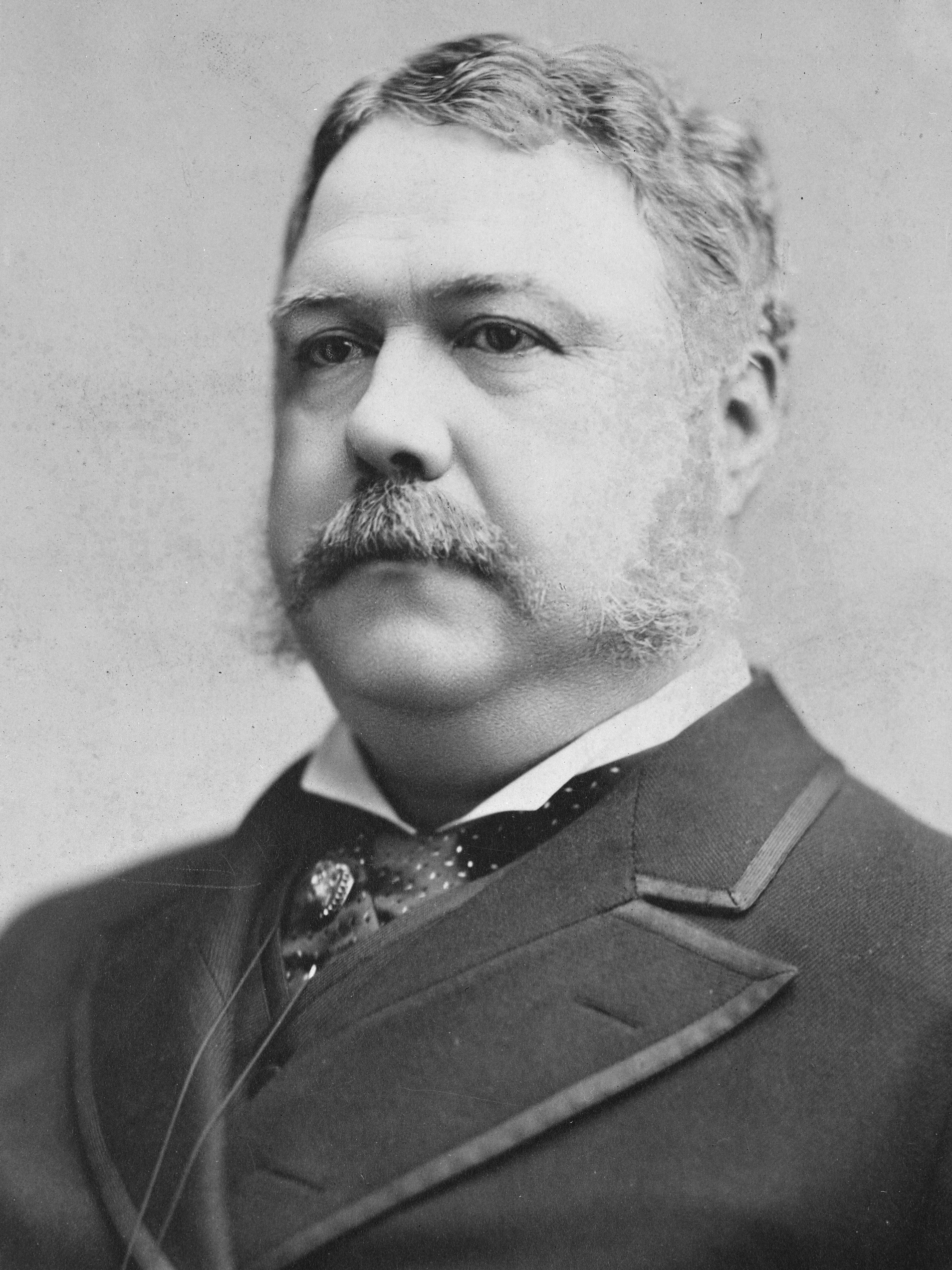
President of the Senate Chester A. Arthur (R)

- President: Chester A. Arthur (R), until September 19, 1881; vacant thereafter
- President pro tempore: Thomas F. Bayard (D), October 10, 1881 – October 13, 1881
  - David Davis (I), from October 13, 1881
  - George F. Edmunds (R), from March 3, 1883
- Democratic Caucus Chairman: George H. Pendleton
- Republican Conference Chairman: Henry B. Anthony

=== House of Representatives ===
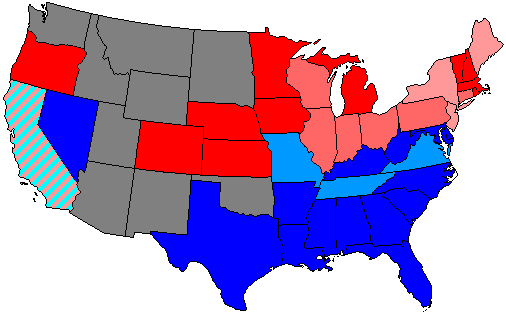
House seats by party holding plurality in state: 80+% to 100% Democratic / 80+% to 100% Republican; 60+% to 80% Democratic / 60+% to 80% Republican; Up to 60% Democratic / Up to 60% Republican

- Speaker: J. Warren Keifer (R)
- Republican Conference Chairman: George M. Robeson

== Major events ==
- March 4, 1881: James A. Garfield became President of the United States
- September 19, 1881: President Garfield died. Vice President Chester A. Arthur became President of the United States

== Major legislation ==
- February 25, 1882: Apportionment of the Tenth Census, ch. 20, 22 Stat. 5
- May 6, 1882: Chinese Exclusion Act, 22 Stat. 58
- August 2, 1882: Passenger Act of 1882, 22 Stat. 186
- August 2, 1882: Rivers and Harbors Act
- January 16, 1883: Pendleton Civil Service Reform Act, ch. 27, 22 Stat. 403
- March 3, 1883: Tariff of 1883 (Mongrel Tariff)

== Members ==
This list is arranged by chamber, then by state. Senators are listed by class, and representatives are listed by district.

Skip to House of Representatives, below

=== Senate ===
Senators were elected by the state legislatures every two years, with one-third beginning new six-year terms with each Congress. Preceding the names in the list below are Senate class numbers, which indicate the cycle of their election.

==== Alabama ====
▌2. John T. Morgan (D)
▌3. James L. Pugh (D)

==== Arkansas ====
▌2. Augustus H. Garland (D)
▌3. James D. Walker (D)

==== California ====
▌1. John F. Miller (R)
▌3. James T. Farley (D)

==== Colorado ====
▌2. Henry M. Teller (R), until April 17, 1882

▌George M. Chilcott (R), April 17, 1882 - January 27, 1883
▌Horace A. W. Tabor (R), from January 27, 1883

▌3. Nathaniel P. Hill (R)

==== Connecticut ====
▌1. Joseph R. Hawley (R)
▌3. Orville H. Platt (R)

==== Delaware ====
▌1. Thomas F. Bayard Sr. (D)
▌2. Eli Saulsbury (D)

==== Florida ====
▌1. Charles W. Jones (D)
▌3. Wilkinson Call (D)

==== Georgia ====
▌2. Benjamin H. Hill (D), until August 16, 1882

▌M. Pope Barrow (D), from November 15, 1882

▌3. Joseph E. Brown (D)

==== Illinois ====
▌2. David Davis (I)
▌3. John A. Logan (R)

==== Indiana ====
▌1. Benjamin Harrison (R)
▌3. Daniel W. Voorhees (D)

==== Iowa ====
▌2. Samuel J. Kirkwood (R), until March 7, 1881

▌James W. McDill (R), from March 8, 1881

▌3. William B. Allison (R)

==== Kansas ====
▌2. Preston B. Plumb (R)
▌3. John J. Ingalls (R)

==== Kentucky ====
▌2. James B. Beck (D)
▌3. John S. Williams (D)

==== Louisiana ====
▌2. William Pitt Kellogg (R)
▌3. Benjamin F. Jonas (D)

==== Maine ====
▌1. Eugene Hale (R)
▌2. James G. Blaine (R), until March 5, 1881

▌William P. Frye (R), from March 15, 1881

==== Maryland ====
▌1. Arthur Pue Gorman (D)
▌3. James B. Groome (D)

==== Massachusetts ====
▌1. Henry L. Dawes (R)
▌2. George F. Hoar (R)

==== Michigan ====
▌1. Omar D. Conger (R)
▌2. Thomas W. Ferry (R)

==== Minnesota ====
▌1. Samuel J. R. McMillan (R)
▌2. William Windom (R), until March 7, 1881

▌Alonzo J. Edgerton (R), March 12, 1881 – October 30, 1881
▌William Windom (R), from November 15, 1881

==== Mississippi ====
▌1. James Z. George (D)
▌2. Lucius Q. C. Lamar (D)

==== Missouri ====
▌1. Francis M. Cockrell (D)
▌3. George G. Vest (D)

==== Nebraska ====
▌1. Charles H. Van Wyck (R)
▌2. Alvin Saunders (R)

==== Nevada ====
▌1. James G. Fair (D)
▌3. John P. Jones (R)

==== New Hampshire ====
▌2. Edward H. Rollins (R)
▌3. Henry W. Blair (R)

==== New Jersey ====
▌1. William J. Sewell (R)
▌2. John R. McPherson (D)

==== New York ====
▌1. Thomas C. Platt (R), until May 16, 1881

▌Warner Miller (R), from July 27, 1881

▌3. Roscoe Conkling (R), until May 16, 1881

▌Elbridge G. Lapham (R), from July 29, 1881

==== North Carolina ====
▌2. Matt W. Ransom (D)
▌3. Zebulon B. Vance (D)

==== Ohio ====
▌1. John Sherman (R)
▌3. George H. Pendleton (D)

==== Oregon ====
▌2. La Fayette Grover (D)
▌3. James H. Slater (D)

==== Pennsylvania ====
▌1. John I. Mitchell (R)
▌3. J. Donald Cameron (R)

==== Rhode Island ====
▌1. Ambrose E. Burnside (R), until September 13, 1881

▌Nelson W. Aldrich (R), from October 5, 1881

▌2. Henry B. Anthony (R)

==== South Carolina ====
▌2. Matthew C. Butler (D)
▌3. Wade Hampton III (D)

==== Tennessee ====
▌1. Howell E. Jackson (D)
▌2. Isham G. Harris (D)

==== Texas ====
▌1. Samuel B. Maxey (D)
▌2. Richard Coke (D)

==== Vermont ====
▌1. George F. Edmunds (R)
▌3. Justin S. Morrill (R)

==== Virginia ====
▌1. William Mahone (RA)
▌2. John W. Johnston (D)

==== West Virginia ====
▌1. Johnson N. Camden (D)
▌2. Henry G. Davis (D)

==== Wisconsin ====
▌1. Philetus Sawyer (R)
▌3. Angus Cameron (R), from March 14, 1881

Senators' party membership by state at the opening of the 47th Congress in March 1881. The green stripes in Virginia represent Readjuster William Mahone, while the gray stripes in Illinois represent independent David Davis. 2 Democrats 1 Democrat and 1 Republican 2 Republicans Territories

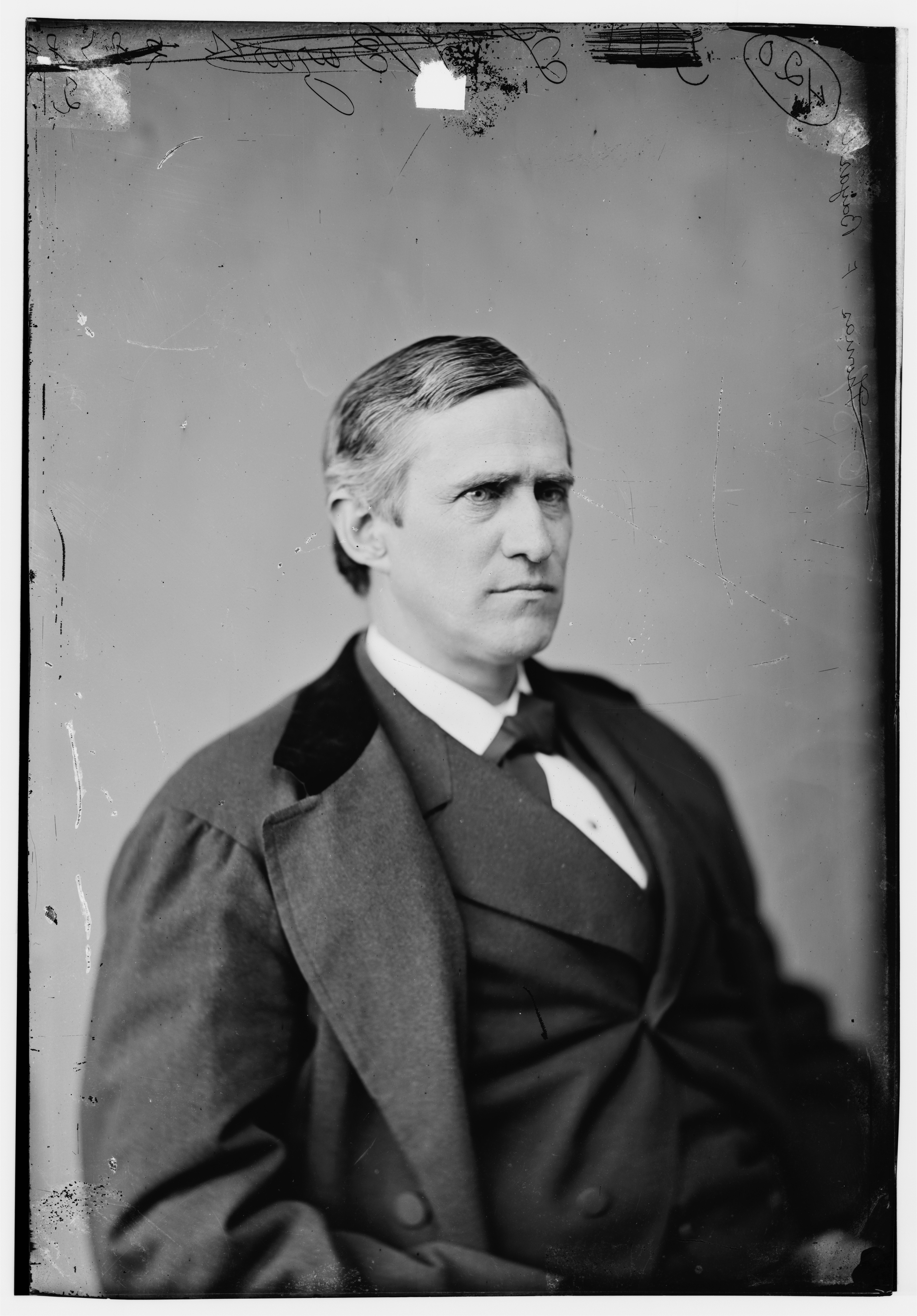
President pro tempore Thomas F. Bayard (D)

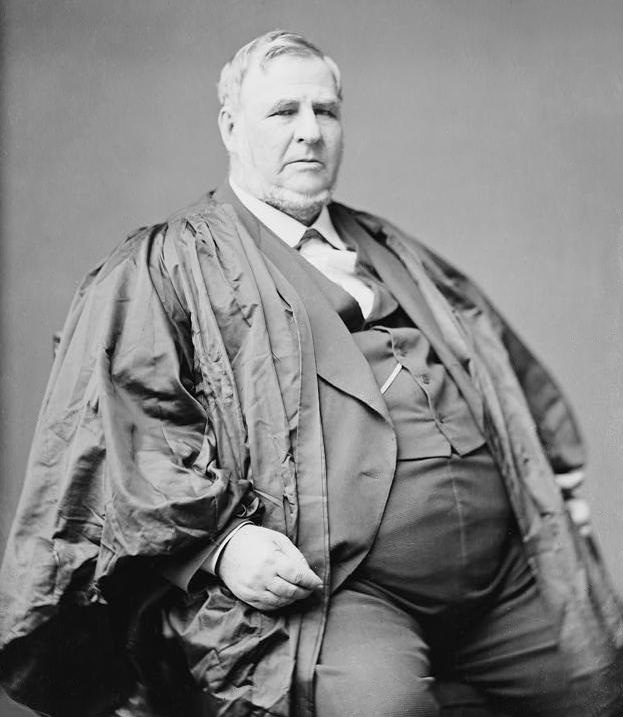
President pro tempore David Davis (I)

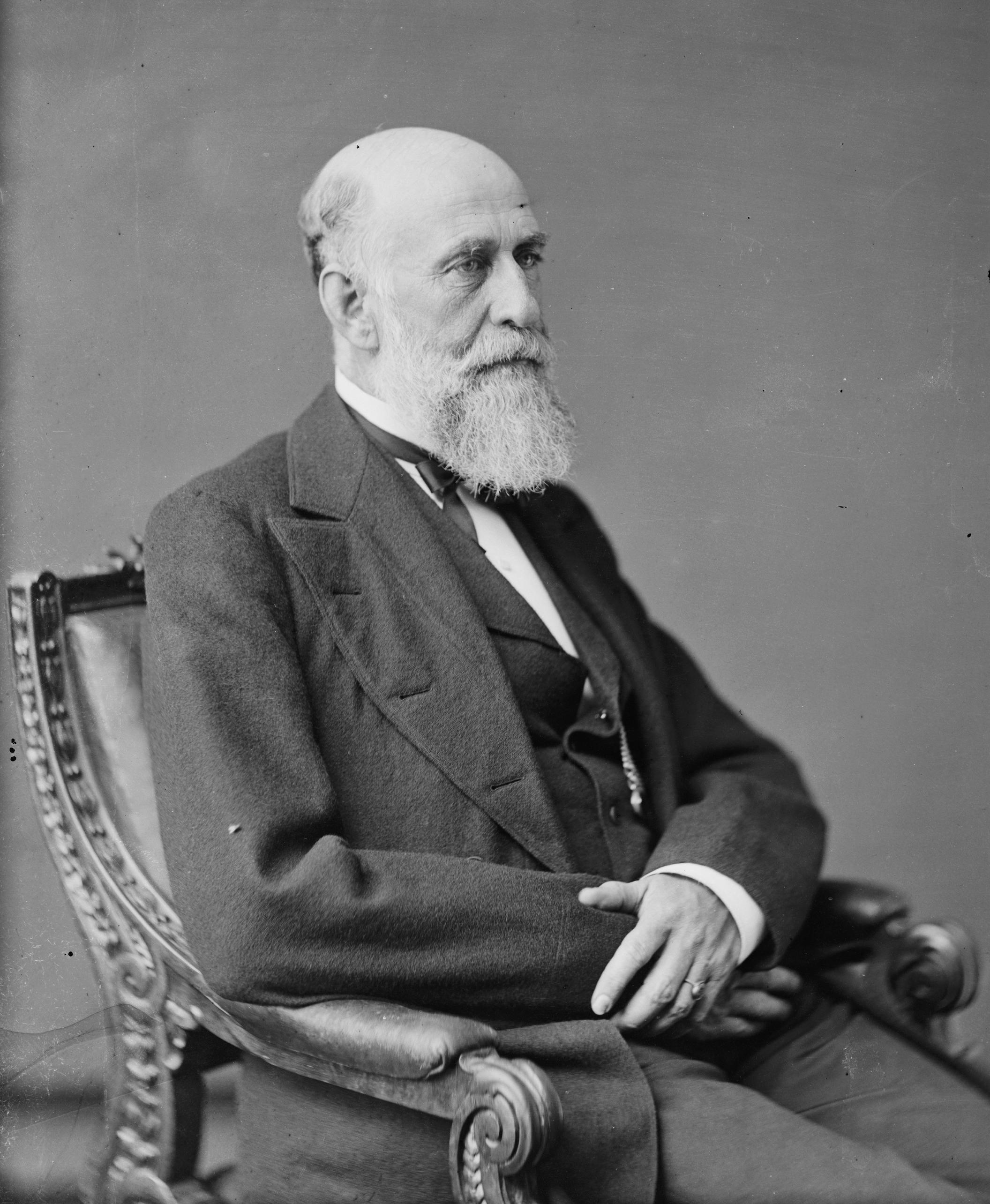
President pro tempore George F. Edmunds (R)

=== House of Representatives ===
Names of representatives are preceded by their district numbers.

==== Alabama ====
▌1. Thomas H. Herndon (D)
▌2. Hilary A. Herbert (D)
▌3. William C. Oates (D)
▌4. Charles M. Shelley (D), until July 20, 1882

▌Charles M. Shelley (D), from November 7, 1882

▌5. Thomas Williams (D)
▌6. Goldsmith W. Hewitt (D)
▌7. William H. Forney (D)
▌8. Joseph Wheeler (D), until June 3, 1882

▌William M. Lowe (GB), June 3, 1882 – October 12, 1882
▌Joseph Wheeler (D), from January 15, 1883

==== Arkansas ====
▌1. Poindexter Dunn (D)
▌2. James K. Jones (D)
▌3. Jordan E. Cravens (D)
▌4. Thomas M. Gunter (D)

==== California ====
▌1. William S. Rosecrans (D)
▌2. Horace F. Page (R)
▌3. Campbell P. Berry (D)
▌4. Romualdo Pacheco (R)

==== Colorado ====
▌At-large. James B. Belford (R)

==== Connecticut ====
▌1. John R. Buck (R)
▌2. James Phelps (D)
▌3. John T. Wait (R)
▌4. Frederick Miles (R)

==== Delaware ====
▌At-large. Edward L. Martin (D)

==== Florida ====
▌1. Robert H. M. Davidson (D)
▌2. Jesse J. Finley (D), until June 1, 1882

▌Horatio Bisbee Jr. (R), from June 1, 1882

==== Georgia ====
▌1. George R. Black (D)
▌2. Henry G. Turner (D)
▌3. Philip Cook (D)
▌4. Hugh Buchanan (D)
▌5. Nathaniel J. Hammond (D)
▌6. James H. Blount (D)
▌7. Judson C. Clements (D)
▌8. Alexander H. Stephens (D), until November 4, 1882

▌Seaborn Reese (D), from December 4, 1882

9. Emory Speer (ID)

==== Illinois ====
▌1. William Aldrich (R)
▌2. George R. Davis (R)
▌3. Charles B. Farwell (R)
▌4. John C. Sherwin (R)
▌5. Robert M. A. Hawk (R), until June 29, 1882

▌Robert R. Hitt (R), from December 4, 1882

▌6. Thomas J. Henderson (R)
▌7. William Cullen (R)
▌8. Lewis E. Payson (R)
▌9. John H. Lewis (R)
▌10. Benjamin F. Marsh (R)
▌11. James W. Singleton (D)
▌12. William M. Springer (D)
▌13. Dietrich C. Smith (R)
▌14. Joseph G. Cannon (R)
▌15. Samuel W. Moulton (D)
▌16. William A. J. Sparks (D)
▌17. William R. Morrison (D)
▌18. John R. Thomas (R)
▌19. Richard W. Townshend (D)

==== Indiana ====
▌1. William Heilman (R)
▌2. Thomas R. Cobb (D)
▌3. Strother M. Stockslager (D)
▌4. William S. Holman (D)
▌5. Courtland C. Matson (D)
▌6. Thomas M. Browne (R)
▌7. Stanton J. Peelle (R)
▌8. Robert B. F. Peirce (R)
▌9. Godlove S. Orth (R), until December 16, 1882

▌Charles T. Doxey (R), from January 17, 1883

▌10. Mark L. De Motte (R)
▌11. George W. Steele (R)
▌12. Walpole G. Colerick (D)
▌13. William H. Calkins (R)

==== Iowa ====
▌1. Moses A. McCoid (R)
▌2. Sewall S. Farwell (R)
▌3. Thomas Updegraff (R)
▌4. Nathaniel C. Deering (R)
▌5. William G. Thompson (R)
▌6. Marsena E. Cutts (R), until March 3, 1883

▌John C. Cook (D), from March 3, 1883

▌7. John A. Kasson (R)
▌8. William P. Hepburn (R)
▌9. Cyrus C. Carpenter (R)

==== Kansas ====
▌1. John A. Anderson (R)
▌2. Dudley C. Haskell (R)
▌3. Thomas Ryan (R)

==== Kentucky ====
▌1. Oscar Turner (D)
▌2. James A. McKenzie (D)
▌3. John William Caldwell (D)
▌4. J. Proctor Knott (D)
▌5. Albert S. Willis (D)
▌6. John G. Carlisle (D)
▌7. Joseph C. S. Blackburn (D)
▌8. Philip B. Thompson Jr. (D)
▌9. John D. White (R)
▌10. Elijah C. Phister (D)

==== Louisiana ====
▌1. Randall L. Gibson (D)
▌2. E. John Ellis (D)
▌3. Chester B. Darrall (R)
▌4. Newton C. Blanchard (D)
▌5. J. Floyd King (D)
▌6. Edward W. Robertson (D)

==== Maine ====
▌1. Thomas B. Reed (R)
▌2. William P. Frye (R), until March 17, 1881

▌Nelson Dingley Jr. (R) from September 12, 1881

▌3. Stephen D. Lindsey (R)
▌4. George W. Ladd (GB)
▌5. Thompson H. Murch (GB)

==== Maryland ====
▌1. George W. Covington (D)
▌2. J. Frederick C. Talbott (D)
▌3. Fetter S. Hoblitzell (D)
▌4. Robert M. McLane (D)
▌5. Andrew G. Chapman (D)
▌6. Milton G. Urner (R)

==== Massachusetts ====
▌1. William W. Crapo (R)
▌2. Benjamin W. Harris (R)
▌3. Ambrose A. Ranney (R)
▌4. Leopold Morse (D)
▌5. Selwyn Z. Bowman (R)
▌6. Eben F. Stone (R)
▌7. William A. Russell (R)
▌8. John W. Candler (R)
▌9. William W. Rice (R)
▌10. Amasa Norcross (R)
▌11. George D. Robinson (R)

==== Michigan ====
▌1. Henry W. Lord (R)
▌2. Edwin Willits (R)
▌3. Edward S. Lacey (R)
▌4. Julius C. Burrows (R)
▌5. George W. Webber (R)
▌6. Oliver L. Spaulding (R)
▌7. John T. Rich (R), from April 5, 1881
▌8. Roswell G. Horr (R)
▌9. Jay A. Hubbell (R)

==== Minnesota ====
▌1. Mark H. Dunnell (R)
▌2. Horace B. Strait (R)
▌3. William D. Washburn (R)

==== Mississippi ====
▌1. Henry L. Muldrow (D)
▌2. Vannoy H. Manning (D)
▌3. Hernando Money (D)
▌4. Otho R. Singleton (D)
▌5. Charles E. Hooker (D)
▌6. James R. Chalmers (D), until April 29, 1882

▌John R. Lynch (R), from April 29, 1882

==== Missouri ====
▌1. Martin L. Clardy (D)
▌2. Thomas Allen (D), until April 8, 1882

▌James Henry McLean (R), from December 15, 1882

▌3. Richard G. Frost (D), until March 2, 1883

▌Gustavus Sessinghaus (R), from March 2, 1883

▌4. Lowndes H. Davis (D)
▌5. Richard P. Bland (D)
▌6. Ira Haseltine (GB)
▌7. Theron M. Rice (GB)
▌8. Robert T. Van Horn (R)
▌9. Nicholas Ford (GB)
▌10. Joseph H. Burrows (GB)
▌11. John B. Clark Jr. (D)
▌12. William H. Hatch (D)
▌13. Aylett H. Buckner (D)

==== Nebraska ====
▌At-large. Edward K. Valentine (R)

==== Nevada ====
▌At-large. George W. Cassidy (D)

==== New Hampshire ====
▌1. Joshua G. Hall (R)
▌2. James F. Briggs (R)
▌3. Ossian Ray (R)

==== New Jersey ====
▌1. George M. Robeson (R)
▌2. J. Hart Brewer (R)
▌3. Miles Ross (D)
▌4. Henry S. Harris (D)
▌5. John Hill (R)
▌6. Phineas Jones (R)
▌7. Augustus A. Hardenbergh (D)

==== New York ====
▌1. Perry Belmont (D)
▌2. William E. Robinson (D)
▌3. J. Hyatt Smith (I)
▌4. Archibald M. Bliss (D)
▌5. Benjamin Wood (D)
▌6. Samuel S. Cox (D)
▌7. P. Henry Dugro (D)
▌8. Anson G. McCook (R)
▌9. John Hardy (D), from December 5, 1881
▌10. Abram S. Hewitt (D)
▌11. Levi P. Morton (R), until March 21, 1881

▌Roswell P. Flower (D), from November 8, 1881

▌12. Waldo Hutchins (D)
▌13. John H. Ketcham (R)
▌14. Lewis Beach (D)
▌15. Thomas Cornell (R)
▌16. Michael N. Nolan (D)
▌17. Walter A. Wood (R)
▌18. John Hammond (R)
▌19. Abraham X. Parker (R)
▌20. George West (R)
▌21. Ferris Jacobs Jr. (R)
▌22. Warner Miller (R), until July 26, 1881

▌Charles R. Skinner (R) from November 18, 1881

▌23. Cyrus D. Prescott (R)
▌24. Joseph Mason (R)
▌25. Frank Hiscock (R)
▌26. John H. Camp (R)
▌27. Elbridge G. Lapham (R), until July 29, 1881

▌James W. Wadsworth (R), from November 8, 1881

▌28. Jeremiah W. Dwight (R)
▌29. David P. Richardson (R)
▌30. John Van Voorhis (R)
▌31. Richard Crowley (R)
▌32. Jonathan Scoville (D)
▌33. Henry H. Van Aernam (R)

==== North Carolina ====
▌1. Louis C. Latham (D)
▌2. Orlando Hubbs (R)
▌3. John W. Shackelford (D), until January 18, 1883
▌4. William Ruffin Cox (D)
▌5. Alfred M. Scales (D)
▌6. Clement Dowd (D)
▌7. Robert F. Armfield (D)
▌8. Robert B. Vance (D)

==== Ohio ====
▌1. Benjamin Butterworth (R)
▌2. Thomas L. Young (R)
▌3. Henry L. Morey (R)
▌4. Emanuel Shultz (R)
▌5. Benjamin Le Fevre (D)
▌6. James M. Ritchie (R)
▌7. John P. Leedom (D)
▌8. J. Warren Keifer (R)
▌9. James S. Robinson (R)
▌10. John B. Rice (R)
▌11. Henry S. Neal (R)
▌12. George L. Converse (D)
▌13. Gibson Atherton (D)
▌14. George W. Geddes (D)
▌15. Rufus R. Dawes (R)
▌16. Jonathan T. Updegraff (R), until November 30, 1882

▌Joseph D. Taylor (R), from January 2, 1883

▌17. William McKinley (R)
▌18. Addison S. McClure (R)
▌19. Ezra B. Taylor (R)
▌20. Amos Townsend (R)

==== Oregon ====
▌At-large. Melvin C. George (R)

==== Pennsylvania ====
▌1. Henry H. Bingham (R)
▌2. Charles O'Neill (R)
▌3. Samuel J. Randall (D)
▌4. William D. Kelley (R)
▌5. Alfred C. Harmer (R)
▌6. William Ward (R)
▌7. William Godshalk (R)
▌8. Daniel Ermentrout (D)
▌9. A. Herr Smith (R)
▌10. William Mutchler (D)
▌11. Robert Klotz (D)
▌12. Joseph A. Scranton (R)
▌13. Charles N. Brumm (GB)
▌14. Samuel F. Barr (R)
▌15. Cornelius C. Jadwin (R)
▌16. Robert J. C. Walker (R)
▌17. Jacob M. Campbell (R)
▌18. Horatio G. Fisher (R)
▌19. Frank E. Beltzhoover (D)
▌20. Andrew G. Curtin (D)
▌21. Morgan R. Wise (D)
▌22. Russell Errett (R)
▌23. Thomas M. Bayne (R)
▌24. William S. Shallenberger (R)
▌25. James Mosgrove (GB)
▌26. Samuel H. Miller (R)
▌27. Lewis F. Watson (R)

==== Rhode Island ====
▌1. Nelson W. Aldrich (R), until October 4, 1881

▌Henry J. Spooner (R), from December 5, 1881

▌2. Jonathan Chace (R)

==== South Carolina ====
▌1. John S. Richardson (D)
▌2. Michael P. O'Connor (D), until April 26, 1881

▌Samuel Dibble (D), June 9, 1881 – May 31, 1882
▌Edmund W. M. Mackey (IR), from May 31, 1882

▌3. D. Wyatt Aiken (D)
▌4. John H. Evins (D)
▌5. George D. Tillman (D), until June 19, 1882

▌Robert Smalls (R), from July 19, 1882

==== Tennessee ====
▌1. Augustus H. Pettibone (R)
▌2. Leonidas C. Houk (R)
▌3. George G. Dibrell (D)
▌4. Benton McMillin (D)
▌5. Richard Warner (D)
▌6. John F. House (D)
▌7. Washington C. Whitthorne (D)
▌8. John D. C. Atkins (D)
▌9. Charles B. Simonton (D)
▌10. William R. Moore (R)

==== Texas ====
▌1. John H. Reagan (D)
▌2. David B. Culberson (D)
▌3. Olin Wellborn (D)
▌4. Roger Q. Mills (D)
▌5. George W. Jones (GB)
▌6. Christopher C. Upson (D)

==== Vermont ====
▌1. Charles H. Joyce (R)
▌2. James M. Tyler (R)
▌3. William W. Grout (R)

==== Virginia ====
▌1. George T. Garrison (D)
▌2. John F. Dezendorf (R)
▌3. George D. Wise (D)
▌4. Joseph Jorgensen (R)
▌5. George Cabell (D)
▌6. John R. Tucker (D)
▌7. John Paul (RA)
▌8. John S. Barbour Jr. (D)
▌9. Abram Fulkerson (RA)

==== West Virginia ====
▌1. Benjamin Wilson (D)
▌2. John B. Hoge (D)
▌3. John E. Kenna (D)

==== Wisconsin ====
▌1. Charles G. Williams (R)
▌2. Lucien B. Caswell (R)
▌3. George C. Hazelton (R)
▌4. Peter V. Deuster (D)
▌5. Edward S. Bragg (D)
▌6. Richard W. Guenther (R)
▌7. Herman L. Humphrey (R)
▌8. Thaddeus C. Pound (R)

==== Non-voting delegates ====
▌Arizona Territory. Granville H. Oury (D)
▌Dakota Territory. Richard F. Pettigrew (R)
▌Idaho Territory. George Ainslie (D)
▌Montana Territory. Martin Maginnis (D)
▌New Mexico Territory. Tranqulino Luna (R)
▌Utah Territory. John T. Caine (D)
▌Washington Territory. Thomas H. Brents (R)
▌Wyoming Territory. Morton E. Post (D)

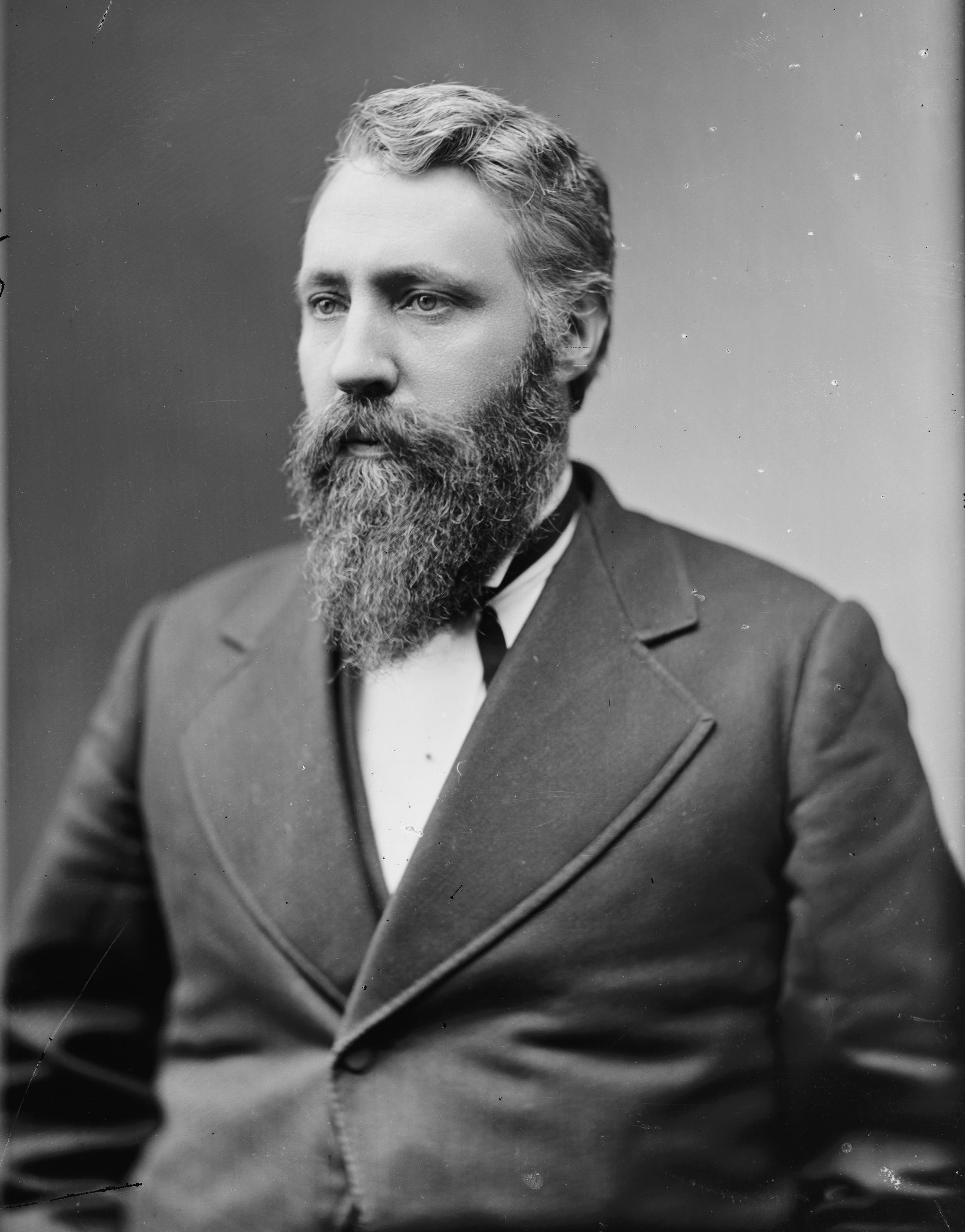
Speaker of the House J. Warren Keifer

== Changes in membership ==
The count below reflects changes from the beginning of this Congress.

=== Senate ===
- Deaths: 2
- Resignations: 8
- Interim appointments: 1
- Total replacements: 8
  - Democratic: no net change
  - Republican: no net change
- Total seats with changes: 10

Senate changes
State (class)	Vacated by	Reason for change	Successor	Date of successor's formal installation (Note: When seated or oath administered, not necessarily when service began.)
Wisconsin (3)	Vacant	Senator Matthew H. Carpenter died in the previous congress. Successor elected March 14, 1881.	Angus Cameron (R)	March 14, 1881
Maine (2)	James G. Blaine (R)	Resigned March 5, 1881, to become U.S. Secretary of State. Successor elected March 18, 1881.	William P. Frye (R)	March 18, 1881
Iowa (2)	Samuel J. Kirkwood (R)	Resigned March 7, 1881, to become U.S. Secretary of the Interior. Successor appointed March 8, 1881, to continue the term. Appointee elected January 25, 1882, to finish the term.	James W. McDill (R)	March 8, 1881
Minnesota (2)	William Windom (R)	Resigned March 7, 1881, to become U.S. Secretary of the Treasury. Successor appointed March 12, 1881, to continue the term.	Alonzo J. Edgerton (R)	March 12, 1881
New York (1)	Thomas C. Platt (R)	Resigned May 16, 1881, as a protest against federal appointments made in New York. Successor elected October 11, 1881.	Warner Miller (R)	July 27, 1881
New York (3)	Roscoe Conkling (R)	Resigned May 16, 1881, as a protest against federal appointments made in New York. Successor elected October 11, 1881.	Elbridge G. Lapham (R)	August 2, 1881
Rhode Island (1)	Ambrose Burnside (R)	Died September 13, 1881. Successor elected October 5, 1881.	Nelson W. Aldrich (R)	October 5, 1881
Minnesota (2)	Alonzo J. Edgerton (R)	Interim appointee replaced by successor elected October 30, 1881.	William Windom (R)	November 15, 1881
Colorado (2)	Henry M. Teller (R)	Resigned April 17, 1882, to become U.S. Secretary of the Interior. Successor appointed April 17, 1882.	George M. Chilcott (R)	April 17, 1882
Georgia (2)	Benjamin H. Hill (D)	Died August 16, 1882. Successor elected November 15, 1882.	M. Pope Barrow (D)	November 15, 1882
Colorado (2)	George M. Chilcott (R)	Interim appointee replaced by successor elected January 27, 1883.	Horace Tabor (R)	January 27, 1883

=== House of Representatives ===
- Deaths: 6
- Resignations: 9
- Contested elections: 8
- Total replacements: 14
  - Democratic: 1 seat net gain
  - Republican: 1 seat net loss
- Total seats with changes: 22

House changes
District	Vacated by	Reason for change	Successor	Date of successor's formal installation
Michigan 7	Vacant	Rep. Omar D. Conger resigned during previous congress	John T. Rich (R)	April 5, 1881
New York 9	Vacant	Rep. Fernando Wood elected but died before Congress convened	John Hardy (D)	December 5, 1881
Maine 2	William P. Frye (R)	Resigned March 17, 1881 when elected U.S. Senator.	Nelson Dingley Jr. (R)	September 12, 1881
New York 11	Levi P. Morton (R)	Resigned March 21, 1881 to become U.S. Minister to France.	Roswell P. Flower (D)	November 8, 1881
South Carolina 2	Michael P. O'Connor (D)	Died April 26, 1881, during a contested election. Dibble presented credentials to replace him due to his death.	Samuel Dibble (D)	June 9, 1881
New York 22	Warner Miller (R)	Resigned July 26, 1881 when elected U.S. Senator.	Charles R. Skinner (R)	November 8, 1881
New York 27	Elbridge G. Lapham (R)	Resigned July 29, 1881 when elected U.S. Senator.	James W. Wadsworth (R)	November 8, 1881
Rhode Island 1	Nelson W. Aldrich (R)	Resigned October 5, 1881 when elected U.S. Senator. Successor elected November 22, 1881.	Henry J. Spooner (R)	December 5, 1881
Missouri 2	Thomas Allen (D)	Died April 8, 1882	James H. McLean (R)	December 15, 1882
Mississippi 6	James R. Chalmers (D)	Lost contested election April 29, 1882	John R. Lynch (R)	April 29, 1882
South Carolina 2	Samuel Dibble (D)	Lost contested election May 31, 1882, during an election originally contested with Michael P. O'Connor. Dibble presented credentials to replace him until Mackey was determined to be the victor under terms of the original election.	Edmund W. M. Mackey (IR)	May 31, 1882
Florida 2	Jesse J. Finley (D)	Lost contested election June 1, 1882	Horatio Bisbee Jr. (R)	June 1, 1882
Alabama 8	Joseph Wheeler (D)	Lost contested election June 3, 1882	William M. Lowe (GB)	June 3, 1882
Illinois 5	Robert M. A. Hawk (R)	Died June 29, 1882	Robert R. Hitt (R)	November 7, 1882
South Carolina 5	George D. Tillman (D)	Lost contested election July 19, 1882	Robert Smalls (R)	July 19, 1882
Alabama 4	Charles M. Shelley (D)	Election contested by James Q. Smith. Seat declared vacant July 20, 1882. Shelley re-elected to fill seat.	Charles M. Shelley (D)	November 7, 1882
Alabama 8	William M. Lowe (GB)	Died October 12, 1882	Joseph Wheeler (D)	January 15, 1883
Georgia 8	Alexander H. Stephens (D)	Resigned November 4, 1882 when elected Governor of Georgia.	Seaborn Reese (D)	December 4, 1882
Ohio 16	Jonathan T. Updegraff (R)	Died November 30, 1882	Joseph D. Taylor (R)	January 2, 1883
Indiana 9	Godlove S. Orth (R)	Died December 16, 1882	Charles T. Doxey (R)	January 17, 1883
North Carolina 3	John W. Shackelford (D)	Died January 18, 1883	Vacant	Not filled this term
Missouri 3	Richard G. Frost (D)	Lost contested election March 2, 1883	Gustavus Sessinghaus (R)	March 2, 1883
Iowa 6	Marsena E. Cutts (R)	Lost election contest March 3, 1883	John C. Cook (D)	March 3, 1883

== Committees ==
Lists of committees and their party leaders for members of the House and Senate committees can be found through the Official Congressional Directory at the bottom of this article. The directory after the pages of terms of service lists committees of the Senate, House (Standing with Subcommittees, Select and Special) and Joint and, after that, House/Senate committee assignments. On the committees section of the House and Senate in the Official Congressional Directory, the committee's members on the first row on the left side shows the chairman of the committee and on the right side shows the ranking member of the committee.

=== Senate ===
- Additional Accommodations for the Library of Congress (Select) (Chairman: Daniel W. Voorhees; Ranking Member: N/A)
- Agriculture (Chairman: William Mahone; Ranking Member: Henry G. Davis)
- Appropriations (Chairman: William B. Allison; Ranking Member: Henry G. Davis)
- Audit and Control the Contingent Expenses of the Senate (Chairman: John P. Jones; Ranking Member: Zebulon B. Vance)
- Cabinet Officers on the Floor of the Senate (Select)
- Civil Service and Retrenchment (Chairman: Joseph R. Hawley; Ranking Member: Matthew C. Butler)
- Claims (Chairman: Angus Cameron; Ranking Member: James L. Pugh)
- Commerce (Chairman: Samuel J.R. McMillan; Ranking Member: Matt W. Ransom)
- Distilled Spirit Tax Bill (Select)
- Distributing Public Revenue Among the States (Select)
- District of Columbia (Chairman: John J. Ingalls; Ranking Member: Isham G. Harris)
- Education and Labor (Chairman: Henry W. Blair; Ranking Member: Samuel B. Maxey)
- Engrossed Bills (Chairman: Eli Saulsbury; Ranking Member: Warner Miller)
- Enrolled Bills (Chairman: William J. Sewell; Ranking Member: James L. Pugh)
- Epidemic Diseases (Select) (Chairman: Isham G. Harris; Ranking Member: Henry M. Teller)
- Examine the Several Branches in the Civil Service (Select)
- Finance (Chairman: Justin S. Morrill; Ranking Member: Thomas F. Bayard)
- Foreign Relations (Chairman: William Windom; Ranking Member: John W. Johnston)
- Indian Affairs (Chairman: Henry L. Dawes; Ranking Member: Richard Coke)
- Judiciary (Chairman: George F. Edmunds; Ranking Member: Augustus H. Garland)
- Manufactures (Chairman: Omar D. Conger; Ranking Member: John R. McPherson)
- Military Affairs (Chairman: John A. Logan; Ranking Member: Francis M. Cockrell)
- Mines and Mining (Chairman: Nathaniel P. Hill; Ranking Member: Wade Hampton)
- Mississippi River and its Tributaries (Select) (Chairman: Charles H. Van Wyck; Ranking Member: Benjamin F. Jonas)
- Naval Affairs (Chairman: J. Donald Cameron; Ranking Member: John R. McPherson)
- Nicaraguan Claims (Select) (Chairman: Henry G. Davis; Ranking Member: Nathaniel P. Hill)
- Ordnance and Gunnery (Select)
- Ordnance and Projectiles (Select)
- Ordnance and War Ships (Select)
- Patents (Chairman: Orville H. Platt; Ranking Member: Richard Coke)
- Pensions (Chairman: John I. Mitchell; Ranking Member: James B. Groome)
- Post Office and Post Roads (Chairman: Thomas W. Ferry; Ranking Member: Samuel B. Maxey)
- Potomac River Front (Select)
- Private Land Claims (Chairman: Thomas F. Bayard; Ranking Member: George F. Edmunds)
- Privileges and Elections (Chairman: George F. Hoar; Ranking Member: Eli Saulsbury)
- Public Lands (Chairman: Preston B. Plumb; Ranking Member: Charles W. Jones)
- Railroads (Chairman: William P. Kellogg; Ranking Member: Lucius Quintus Cincinnatus Lamar)
- Revenue Collections in North Carolina (Special)
- Revision of the Laws (Chairman: John F. Miller; Ranking Member: David Davis)
- Revolutionary Claims (Chairman: John W. Johnston; Ranking Member: Henry B. Anthony)
- Rules (Chairman: William P. Frye; Ranking Member: Wilkinson Call)
- Sioux and Crow Indians (Select)
- Tariff Regulation (Select)
- Tenth Census (Select) (Chairman: Eugene Hale; Ranking Member: George H. Pendleton)
- Territories (Chairman: Alvin Saunders; Ranking Member: Matthew C. Butler)
- Transportation Routes to the Seaboard (Chairman: Benjamin Harrison; Ranking Member: James B. Beck)
- Whole
- Woman Suffrage (Select) (Chairman: Elbridge G. Lapham; Ranking Member: James Z. George)

=== House of Representatives ===
- Accounts (Chairman: Milton G. Urner; Ranking Member: Edward L. Martin)
- Alcoholic Liquor Traffic (Select) (Chairman: John T. Wait; Ranking Member: Thomas Williams)
- Agriculture (Chairman: Edward K. Valentine; Ranking Member: William Cullen)
- Appropriations (Chairman: Frank Hiscock; Ranking Member: Joseph Clay Stiles Blackburn)
- Banking and Currency (Chairman: William W. Crapo; Ranking Member: John H. Ketcham)
- Claims (Chairman: Richard Crowley; Ranking Member: Robert J.C. Walker)
- Coinage, Weights and Measures (Chairman: Horatio G. Fisher; Ranking Member: Ira S. Hazeltine)
- Commerce (Chairman: Horace F. Page; Ranking Member: Melvin C. George)
- District of Columbia (Chairman: Henry S. Neal; Ranking Member: John F. Dezendorf)
- Education and Labor (Chairman: John C. Sherwin; Ranking Member: Albert S. Willis)
- Elections (Chairman: William H. Calkins; Ranking Member: Ferris Jacobs Jr.)
- Enrolled Bills (Chairman: William Aldrich; Ranking Member: Cornelius C. Jadwin)
- Expenditures in the Interior Department (Chairman: Jay Abel Hubbell; Ranking Member: Charles B. Simonton)
- Expenditures in the Justice Department (Chairman: Edwin Willits; Ranking Member: Otho R. Singleton)
- Expenditures in the Navy Department (Chairman: George M. Robeson; Ranking Member: Leopold Morse)
- Expenditures in the Post Office Department (Chairman: Joseph G. Cannon; Ranking Member: John H. Reagan)
- Expenditures in the State Department (Chairman: Nathaniel C. Deering; Ranking Member: Thomas H. Herndon)
- Expenditures in the Treasury Department (Chairman: James B. Belford; Ranking Member: William H. Forney)
- Expenditures in the War Department (Chairman: James F. Briggs; Ranking Member: Joseph Clay Stiles Blackburn)
- Expenditures on Public Buildings (Chairman: Russell Errett; Ranking Member: Morgan R. Wise)
- Foreign Affairs (Chairman: Charles G. Williams; Ranking Member: Robert J.C. Walker)
- Indian Affairs (Chairman: Dudley C. Haskell; Ranking Member: David P. Richardson)
- Invalid Pensions (Chairman: Thomas M. Browne; Ranking Member: James Wolcott Wadsworth)
- Judiciary (Chairman: Thomas B. Reed; Ranking Member: Amasa Norcross)
- Levees and Improvements of the Mississippi River (Chairman: John R. Thomas; Ranking Member: Julius C. Burrows)
- Manufactures (Chairman: James M. Campbell; Ranking Member: Jonathan Chace)
- Memorial on Services Rendered by Carlisle P. Patterson (Select) (Chairman: John A. Kasson; Ranking Member: John D.C. Atkins)
- Mileage (Chairman: Joseph Jorgensen; Ranking Member: Thomas R. Cobb)
- Military Affairs (Chairman: Thomas J. Henderson; Ranking Member: Henry J. Spooner)
- Militia (Chairman: Horace B. Strait; Ranking Member: Edward K. Valentine)
- Mines and Mining (Chairman: John Van Voorhis; Ranking Member: Thomas L. Young)
- Naval Affairs (Chairman: Benjamin W. Harris; Ranking Member: John F. Dezendorf)
- Pacific Railroads (Chairman: George C. Hazelton; Ranking Member: Charles B. Farwell)
- Patents (Chairman: Thomas L. Young; Ranking Member: Henry J. Spooner)
- Pensions (Chairman: Benjamin F. Marsh; Ranking Member: Dietrich C. Smith)
- Post Office and Post Roads (Chairman: Henry H. Bingham; Ranking Member: Henry L. Morey)
- Public Buildings and Grounds (Chairman: William S. Shallenberger; Ranking Member: J. Hyatt Smith)
- Public Expenditures (Chairman: Samuel J. Randall; Ranking Member: George W. Ladd)
- Public Lands (Chairman: Thaddeus C. Pound; Ranking Member: Theron M. Rice)
- Private Land Claims (Chairman: Romualdo Pacheco; Ranking Member: Henry L. Muldrow)
- Railways and Canals (Chairman: Amos Townsend; Ranking Member: J. Hart Brewer)
- Revision of Laws (Chairman: William McKinley; Ranking Member: Cornelius C. Jadwin)
- Rules (Chairman: J. Warren Keifer; Ranking Member: Samuel J. Randall)
- Standards of Official Conduct
- Territories (Chairman: Julius C. Burrows; Ranking Member: William W. Grout)
- War Claims (Chairman: Leonidas C. Houk; Ranking Member: Edward W. Robertson)
- Ways and Means (Chairman: William D. Kelley; Ranking Member: Samuel J. Randall)
- Whole

=== Joint committees ===
- American Shipbuilding (Select)
- Budget Control
- Conditions of Indian Tribes (Special)
- Enrolled Bills (Chairman: Sen. William Aldrich; Vice Chairman: Rep. John E. Kenna)
- The Library (Chairman: Sen. John Sherman; Vice Chairman: Rep. George W. Geddes)
- Printing (Chairman: Sen. Henry B. Anthony; Vice Chairman: Rep. William M. Springer)
- Public Buildings and Grounds (Chairman: Sen. William Mahone; Vice Chairman: Rep. J. Hyatt Smith)
- State, War and Navy Department Building

== Caucuses ==
- Democratic (House)
- Democratic (Senate)

== Employees ==
=== Legislative branch agency directors ===
- Architect of the Capitol: Edward Clark
- Librarian of Congress: Ainsworth Rand Spofford
- Public Printer of the United States: John D. Defrees, until 1882
  - Sterling P. Rounds, from 1882

=== Senate ===
- Secretary: John C. Burch, elected March 24, 1879, died July 28, 1881
  - Francis E. Shober, (Acting), elected October 25, 1881
- Librarian: P. J. Pierce
- Sergeant at Arms: Richard J. Bright
- Chaplain: Joseph J. Bullock (Presbyterian)

=== House of Representatives ===
- Clerk: George M. Adams, until December 5, 1881
  - Edward McPherson, from December 5, 1881
- Sergeant at Arms: John G. Thompson, until December 5, 1881
  - George W. Hooker, from December 5, 1881
- Doorkeeper: Walter P. Brownlow, elected December 5, 1881
- Postmaster: Henry Sherwood, elected December 5, 1881
- Clerk at the Speaker's Table: J. Guilford White
  - Michael Sullivan
- Reading Clerks:
  - Charles N. Clisbee (D)
  - Neill S. Brown Jr. (R) along with John S. Kenyon (R) (starting 1881)
- Chaplain: William P. Harrison (Methodist), until December 5, 1881
  - Frederick D. Power (Disciples of Christ), from December 5, 1881

== See also ==
- 1880 United States elections (elections leading to this Congress)
  - 1880 United States presidential election
  - 1880–81 United States Senate elections
  - 1880 United States House of Representatives elections
- 1882 United States elections (elections during this Congress, leading to the next Congress)
  - 1882–83 United States Senate elections
  - 1882 United States House of Representatives elections
