= Lyne Metcalfe =

American politician and businessman (1822–1906)

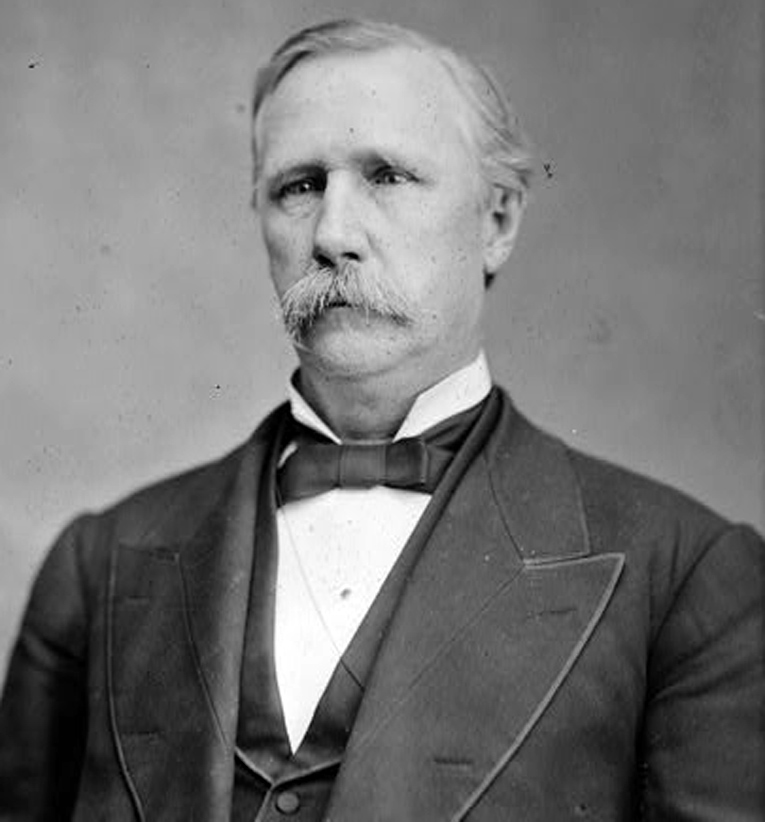
- Metcalfe, c. 1870

Member of the U.S. House of Representatives from Missouri's 3rd district
- In office March 4, 1877 – March 3, 1879
- Preceded by: William Henry Stone
- Succeeded by: R. Graham Frost

Personal details
- Born: Lyne Shackelford Metcalfe; April 21, 1822 Madisonville, Kentucky, US
- Died: January 31, 1906 (aged 83) Kirkwood, Missouri, US
- Party: Republican
- Relations: Edward Leigh Chase (grandson); Frank Swift Chase (grandson); Chevy Chase (3rd-great-grandson)
- Children: 2
- Occupation: Politician, businessman

Lyne Shackelford Metcalfe (April 21, 1822 – January 31, 1906) was an American politician and businessman. A Republican, he was a member of the United States House of Representative from Missouri.

== Biography ==
Metcalfe was born on April 21, 1822, in Madisonville, Kentucky. Educated at common schools, he studied at Shurtleff College and Illinois College, though graduated from neither. He had moved to Illinois in 1838, settling in Alton, Illinois in 1844, where he worked as a merchant. During the American Civil War, he served in the Union Army and was an assistant quartermaster-general under William Rosecrans, ranked captain then colonel. He oversaw river and rail transport in St. Louis during the war. After the war ended, he settled in St. Louis, where he worked as an industrialist.

Metcalfe was a member of the Republican Party. While in Alton, he served on its Board of Alderman and as its mayor in 1840. While in St. Louis, he served on its Board of Aldermen. He represented Missouri's 3rd district in the United States House of Representatives, from March 4, 1877, to March 3, 1879. He lost the bid for renomination.

Metcalfe was married and had two children: Albert and Grace. Grace was the mother of painters Edward Leigh and Frank Swift Chase; Edward is the grandfather of comedian and actor Chevy Chase, making Metcalfe his great-great-great-grandfather. He died on January 31, 1906, aged 83, in Kirkwood, Missouri, from heart disease. He was buried on February 2, in Alton Cemetery.

U.S. House of Representatives
Preceded by William Henry Stone	Member of the U.S. House of Representatives from Missouri's 3rd congressional district March 4, 1877 – March 3, 1879	Succeeded by Richard Graham Frost
