= William Stenger =

American politician

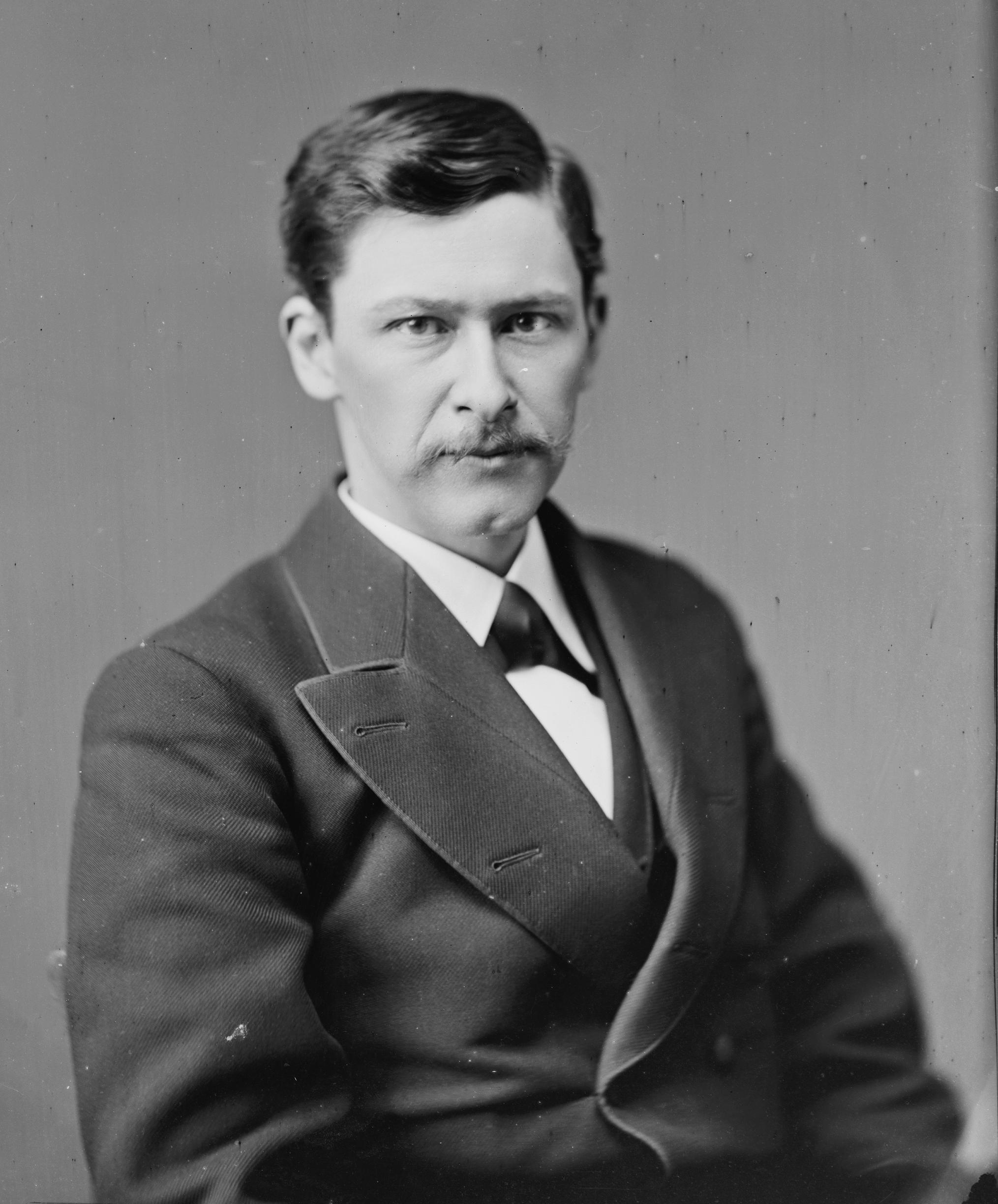
William Stenger

William Shearer Stenger (February 13, 1840 – March 29, 1918) was an American Democratic Party politician.

== Formative years ==
Born in Fort Loudon, Franklin County, Pennsylvania on February 13, 1840, William S. Stenger graduated from Franklin & Marshall College in Lancaster, Pennsylvania. A member of the Class of 1858, he was also a charter member of the Zeta Chapter of the Chi Phi fraternity.

== Career ==
Following his graduation, Stenger studied law and was admitted to the bar in 1860. He then began practice in Chambersburg, Pennsylvania, where he also served as executive director of the Philadelphia Record and, from 1862 to 1871, as district attorney of Franklin County.

Stenger was as an elected as a Democrat to the Forty-fourth and Forty-fifth Congresses, but was an unsuccessful candidate for reelection in 1878. He subsequently served as Secretary of the Commonwealth of Pennsylvania from 1883 to 1887.

== Death and interment ==
Stenger died in Philadelphia, Philadelphia County, Pennsylvania, and was interred at the Falling Spring Presbyterian Church Cemetery in Chambersburg, Pennsylvania.

== Sources ==
- United States Congress. "William Stenger (id: S000849)". Biographical Directory of the United States Congress.
- The Political Graveyard

U.S. House of Representatives
Preceded by Sobieski Ross	Member of the U.S. House of Representatives from Pennsylvania's 18th congressional district 1875–1879	Succeeded by Horatio G. Fisher
