= William Henry Stone =

American businessman and politician (1828–1901)

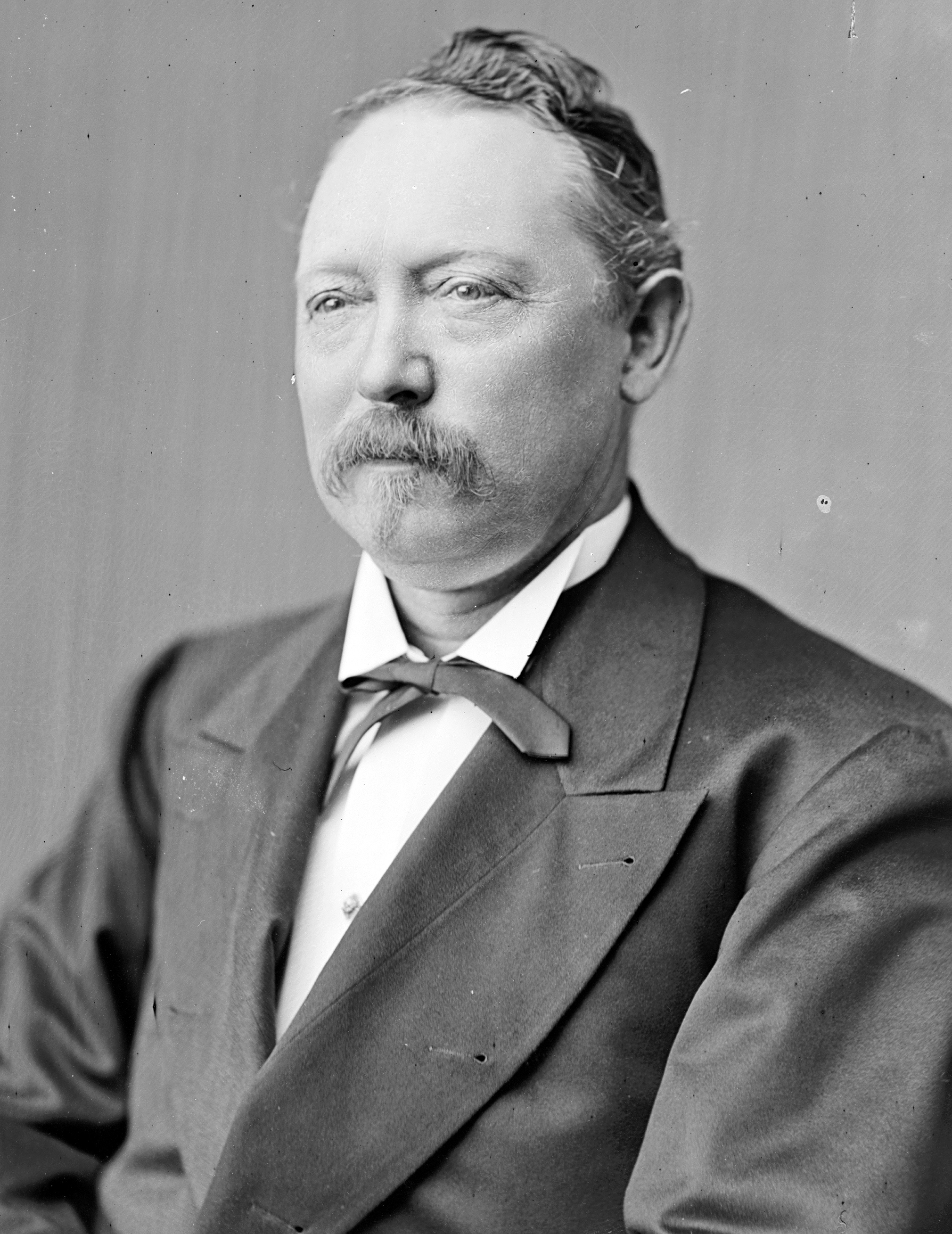
- Portrait by Mathew Brady, between 1865 and 1880

Member of the U.S. House of Representatives from Missouri's 3rd district
- In office March 4, 1873 – March 3, 1877
- Preceded by: James Robinson McCormick
- Succeeded by: Lyne Metcalfe

Member of the Missouri House of Representatives
- In office 1860

Personal details
- Born: William Henry Stone; November 7, 1828 Shawangunk, New York, US
- Died: July 9, 1901 (aged 72) Asbury Park, New Jersey, US
- Party: Democratic
- Children: 8
- Education: University of Michigan
- Occupation: Businessman, politician

William Henry Stone (November 7, 1828 – July 9, 1901) was an American businessman and politician. A Democrat, he was a member of the United States House of Representatives from Missouri.

== Early life and education ==
Stone was born on November 7, 1828, in Shawangunk, New York. He was educated at common schools. From 1836 to 1842, he lived in Detroit, for a time studying at the University of Michigan. He then returned to New York, and in 1845, moving to St. Louis.

== Career ==
Beginning in 1850, Stone was an ironworker. During the American Civil War, when his company, Stone & Howe, helped manufacture gunboats for the Union navy ships, including the Milwaukee and the Winnebago. He served as president of the St. Louis Hot Pressed Nut & Bolt Company after its founding in 1867.

Stone was a member of the Democratic Party. In 1860, he was a member of the Missouri House of Representatives. He served on the St. Louis Board of Water Commissioners from July 5, 1871, to until his resignation on November 15, 1873; he resigned to join the United States House of Representatives. In the House, he represented Missouri's 3rd district from March 4, 1873, to March 3, 1877.

During the 44th Congress, Stone was chairman of the United States House Committees on Expenditures in the Post Office Department and the on Manufactures, as well as a member of the Committee on Roads and Canals. He was not nominated for re-election. Ideologically, the St. Louis Globe-Democrat described him as progressive, while Keith T. Poole describes him as leaning liberal.

After serving in Congress, Stone continued working as a businessman.

== Personal life and death ==
On August 31, 1850, Stone married Mary Ann Bates, having eight children together. He was a member of the Knights Templar of Freemasonry. Beginning in 1872, he visited Asbury Park, New Jersey in the summer.

Stone died on July 9, 1901, aged 72, in Asbury Park. The cause of death was either kidney disease, heart disease and uremia, or pneumonia. He was buried in Bellefontaine Cemetery, in St. Louis. His papers are not archived.

U.S. House of Representatives
| Preceded by James Robinson McCormick | Member of the U.S. House of Representatives from Missouri's 3rd congressional district 1873-1877 | Succeeded by Lyne Metcalfe |
