= Michael D. White =

American politician (1827–1917)

Michael White
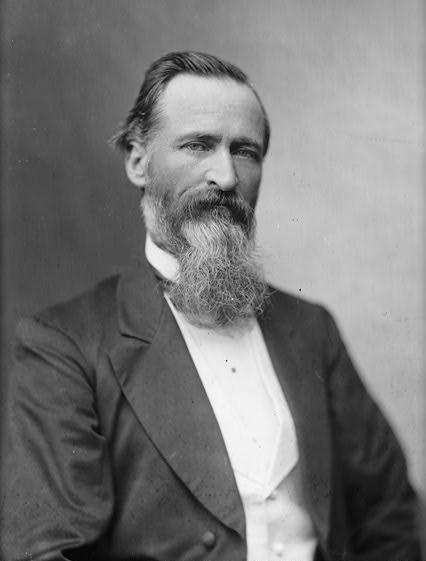

Member of the U.S. House of Representatives from Indiana's 9th district
- In office March 4, 1877 – March 3, 1879
- Preceded by: Charles M. La Follette
- Succeeded by: Winfield K. Denton

Member of the Indiana Senate
- In office 1860–1864

Personal details
- Born: September 8, 1827 Clark County, Ohio, U.S.
- Died: February 6, 1917 (aged 89) Crawfordsville, Indiana, U.S
- Party: Republican
- Education: Wabash College

Michael Doherty White (September 8, 1827 – February 6, 1917) was an American lawyer and politician who served one term as a U.S. representative from Indiana from 1877 to 1879.

== Biography ==
Born in Clark County, Ohio, White moved with his parents to Tippecanoe County, Indiana, in 1829, and pursued classical studies. He moved to Crawfordsville, Indiana, in 1848. He attended the county seminary and Wabash College, Crawfordsville, clerked in a store for one year, and studied law to gain admission to the bar in 1854. He commenced the practice of his profession in Crawfordsville, and was a law partner of Gen. Lew Wallace. White served as prosecuting attorney of Montgomery and Boone Counties from 1854 to 1856, and served as member of the Indiana State Senate from 1860 to 1864.

=== Congress ===
White was elected as a Republican to the Forty-fifth Congress (March 4, 1877 – March 3, 1879). He was not a candidate for renomination in 1878.

=== Later career and death ===
He continued the practice of law in Crawfordsville, Indiana, until 1911, and died there on February 6, 1917. He was interred in the Masonic Cemetery.

U.S. House of Representatives
| Preceded by Thomas J. Cason | Member of the U.S. House of Representatives from Indiana's 9th congressional district March 4, 1877 – March 3, 1879 | Succeeded by Godlove S. Orth |
