= Louis E. Atkinson =

American politician (1841–1910)

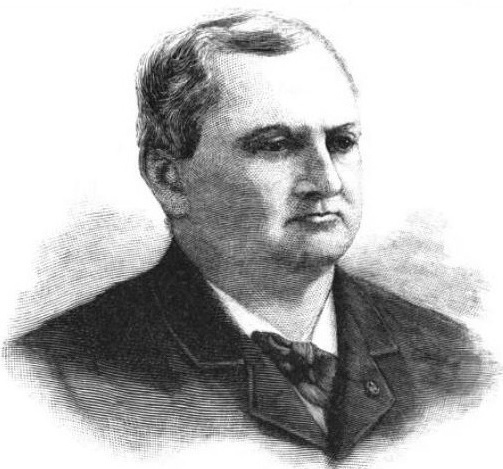
- Louis E. Atkinson, Congressman from Pennsylvania

Member of the U.S. House of Representatives from Pennsylvania's 18th district
- In office March 4, 1883 – March 3, 1893
- Preceded by: Horatio G. Fisher
- Succeeded by: Thaddeus M. Mahon

Personal details
- Born: April 16, 1841 Delaware Township, Pennsylvania, US
- Died: February 5, 1910 (aged 68)
- Party: Republican

Louis Evans Atkinson (April 16, 1841 – February 5, 1910) was a physician, attorney, and a Republican member of the U.S. House of Representatives from Pennsylvania.

== Biography ==
Louis E. Atkinson was born in Delaware Township, Juniata County, Pennsylvania. He attended the common schools and Airy View and Milnwood Academies. He studied medicine and was graduated from the medical department of the College of the City of New York in 1861.

During the early days of the American Civil War, he entered the medical department of the Union Army on September 5, 1861. He served as assistant surgeon in the First Pennsylvania Reserve Cavalry and as surgeon of the One Hundred and Eighty-eighth Pennsylvania Volunteer Infantry, until mustered out in December 1865.

He was disabled while in the Army and, being unable to practice medicine, studied law. He was admitted to the bar in September 1870 and commenced practice in Mifflintown, Pennsylvania.

Atkinson was elected as a Republican to the Forty-eighth and to the four succeeding Congresses. He served as chairman of the United States Committee on Expenditures in the Department of the Treasury during the Fifty-first Congress. He became a candidate for renomination in 1892, but ultimately withdrew. He resumed the practice of law in Mifflintown. He was appointed president judge of the forty-first Pennsylvania district and served one year.

He died in Mifflintown in 1910. Interment was in the Presbyterian Cemetery.

== Sources ==
- United States Congress. "Louis E. Atkinson (id: A000331)". Biographical Directory of the United States Congress. Retrieved on 2008-02-14
- Johnson, Rossiter, ed. (1906). "Atkinson, Louis E.". The Biographical Dictionary of America. Vol. 1. Boston: American Biographical Society. p. 160.
- The Political Graveyard

U.S. House of Representatives
Preceded by Horatio G. Fisher	Member of the U.S. House of Representatives from Pennsylvania's 18th congressional district 1883–1893	Succeeded by Thaddeus M. Mahon
