= Horatio G. Fisher =

American politician (1838–1890)

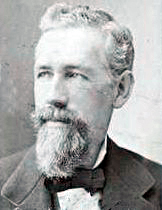

Member of the U.S. House of Representatives from Pennsylvania's 18th district
- In office March 4, 1879 – March 3, 1883
- Preceded by: William Stenger
- Succeeded by: Louis E. Atkinson

Member of the Pennsylvania Senate
- In office 1876-1879

Personal details
- Born: April 21, 1838 Huntingdon, Pennsylvania
- Died: May 8, 1890 (aged 52) Punxsutawney, Pennsylvania
- Party: Republican
- Education: Lafayette College

Horatio Gates Fisher (April 21, 1838 – May 8, 1890) was a Republican member of the U.S. House of Representatives from Pennsylvania.

== Biography ==
Horatio G. Fisher was born in Huntingdon, Pennsylvania. He attended public and private schools. He graduated from Lafayette College in Easton, Pennsylvania, in July 1855. He engaged in mining, shipping, and the wholesale coal business. He served as a member of the borough council from 1862 to 1865, auditor of Huntingdon County, Pennsylvania, from 1865 to 1868, and burgess of the borough of Huntingdon from 1874 to 1876. He was a member of the Pennsylvania State Senate from 1876 to 1879.

Fisher was elected as a Republican to the Forty-sixth and Forty-seventh Congresses. He served as chairman of the United States House Committee on Coinage, Weights, and Measures during the Forty-seventh Congress. He declined to be a candidate for renomination, and resumed his former business pursuits. He was appointed by Governor James A. Beaver a member of the board of managers of Huntingdon Reformatory in 1888. He died in Punxsutawney, Pennsylvania, in 1890. Interment in River View Cemetery in Huntingdon.

== Sources ==
- United States Congress. "Horatio G. Fisher (id: F000148)". Biographical Directory of the United States Congress.
- The Political Graveyard

U.S. House of Representatives
Preceded by William S. Stenger	Member of the U.S. House of Representatives from Pennsylvania's 18th congressional district 1879–1883	Succeeded by Louis E. Atkinson
