= Thomas B. Ward =

American politician (1835 – 1892)

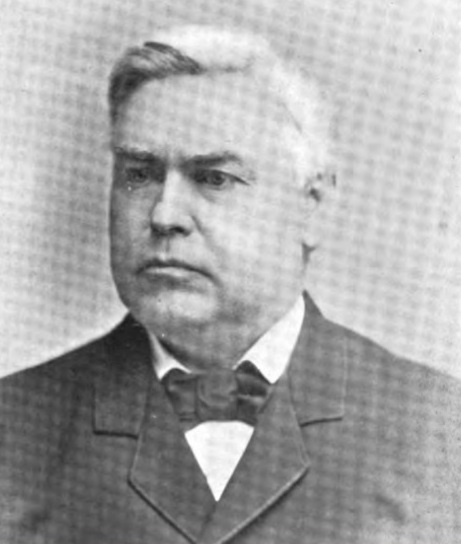

Member of the U.S. House of Representatives from Indiana's 9th district
- In office March 4, 1883 – March 3, 1887
- Preceded by: Charles T. Doxey
- Succeeded by: Joseph B. Cheadle

Personal details
- Born: Thomas Bayless Ward; April 27, 1835 Marysville, Ohio, U.S.
- Died: January 1, 1892 (aged 56) Lafayette, Indiana, U.S.
- Resting place: Springvale Cemetery

Thomas Bayless Ward (April 27, 1835 – January 1, 1892) was an American lawyer, jurist, and politician who served two terms as a U.S. representative from Indiana from 1883 until 1887.

== Biography ==
Born in Marysville, Ohio, Ward moved with his parents to Lafayette, Indiana, in May 1836. He attended Wabash College and graduated from Miami University in June 1855.

He served as clerk of the city of Lafayette in 1855 and 1856. He was admitted to the bar in 1857 and began practicing law in Lafayette.

=== Early public service ===
He served as the city attorney in 1859 and 1860 and as mayor from 1861 to 1865. Later, he served as judge of the superior court of Tippecanoe County, Indiana from 1875 to 1880.

=== Congress ===
Ward was elected as a Democrat to the Forty-eighth and Forty-ninth Congresses (March 4, 1883 – March 3, 1887).

=== Later career and death ===
He resumed the practice of law in Lafayette, where he died January 1, 1892. He was interred in Springvale Cemetery.

U.S. House of Representatives
Preceded by Charles T. Doxey	Member of the U.S. House of Representatives from Indiana's 9th congressional district 1883-1887	Succeeded by Joseph B. Cheadle
