= Godlove S. Orth =

American politician (1817–1882)

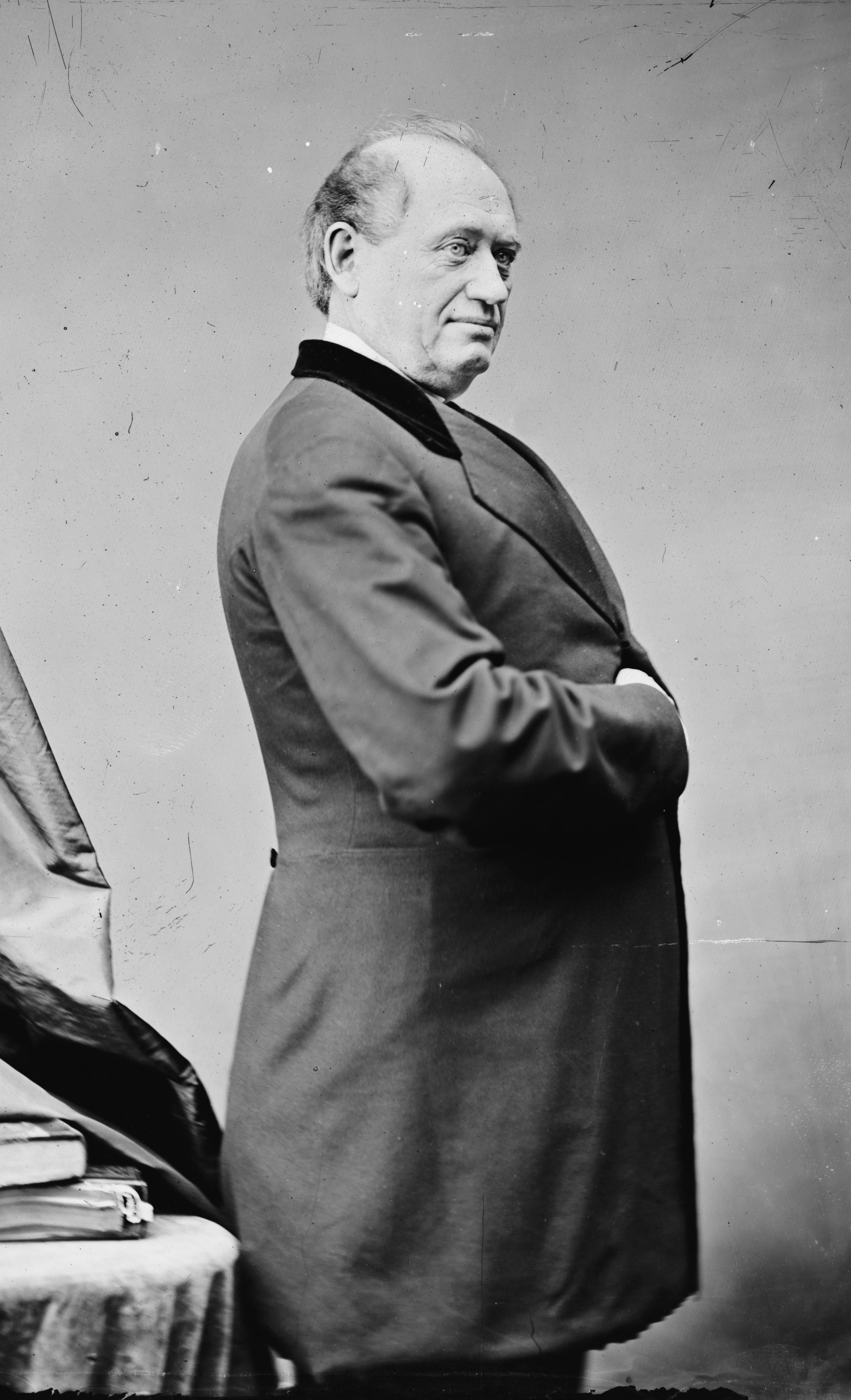
- Orth, c. 1860 – c. 1875

8th United States Minister to Austria-Hungary
- In office March 9, 1875 – March 10, 1876
- President: Ulysses S. Grant
- Preceded by: John Jay II
- Succeeded by: Edward F. Beale

Member of the U.S. House of Representatives from Indiana
- In office March 4, 1863 – March 3, 1871
- Preceded by: Albert S. White (8th); Henry D. Washburn (7th)
- Succeeded by: James N. Tyner (8th); Mahlon D. Manson (7th)
- Constituency: 8th district (1863-69); 7th district (1869-71)
- In office March 4, 1873 – March 3, 1875
- Preceded by: District established
- Succeeded by: District eliminated
- Constituency: At-large district
- In office March 4, 1881 – December 16, 1882
- Preceded by: Michael D. White
- Succeeded by: Charles T. Doxey
- Constituency: 9th district

Personal details
- Born: Godlove Stein Orth; April 22, 1817 Lebanon, Pennsylvania, U.S.
- Died: December 16, 1882 (aged 65) Lafayette, Indiana, U.S
- Resting place: Greenbush Cemetery
- Party: Republican
- Other political affiliations: Whig; Know Nothing
- Education: Pennsylvania College

Godlove Stein Orth (April 22, 1817 – December 16, 1882) was a United States representative from Indiana and an acting Lieutenant Governor of Indiana.

== Biography ==
Of German ancestry, he was born near Lebanon, Lebanon County, Pennsylvania, on April 22, 1817. He attended Pennsylvania College at Gettysburg for about one year and then studied law with the office of James Cooper. He entered the bar in 1839.

=== Early political career ===
His political career started with public speeches in 1840 supporting William Henry Harrison for president. He started as a Whig but as that party collapsed, he looked elsewhere. For a time he was the Indiana leader of the Know-Nothings (called the American Party) and later aligned himself with the Republican Party.

He served in the Indiana Senate from 1843 to 1849, and as acting-Lieutenant Governor of Indiana in 1845.

=== Congress ===
He served as a U.S. House representative from Indiana from 1863 to 1871, 1873 to 1875, and from 1879 to 1882.

"Godlove S. Orth is a fat, fluffy, pudgy-cheeked, good-humored old boy, with a volubility co-equal with the necessities of a politician, and a smile that is broad, bewitching, childlike, and bland," the Chicago Times reported in 1876. "He has a good head, well stocked with information and experience, and is no fool." He was, in fact, a politician skilled at political survival, and had to be: as was so often the case with congressmen, local jealousies kept even the most able members from serving more than one or two terms, before some other county in the district demanded the nomination in recognition. Those jealousies and factional feuds nearly prevented his re-election in 1866, and in 1868 he had to fend off a serious challenge from General Lew Wallace. Survival therefore took assiduous cultivation of his constituents. In his district, as he informed another Republican, he kept a list of the top hundred party leaders for each county, and a file on some ten thousand other constituents, "pretty much all the reading Republicans and some Democrats in the District."

When he sent out public documents and books, or speeches from other House members, he would mail them to names on the first list; when he sent pamphlets and his own speeches, it went to the second. Naturally, he had a hearty appreciation of the franking system, as a way of not having to pay the postage costs.

Orth therefore made a reliable second-string leader for the House Republicans in the late 1860s. He stood at the more conservative end of his party during Andrew Johnson's administration: supporting Reconstruction, but trying to bring the President and Congress back into harmony, if it were possible. On the House Foreign Affairs Committee, he became the Grant Administration's most reliable point-man, and in 1871 the one to manage a resolution appointing a fact-finding commission sent to Santo Domingo to prepare the way for possible annexation. A Chicago Tribune correspondent described him as "as good a man as can be found, without prejudice, without notions, without fixed ideas upon any question. He is one of those men, who, upon large, general irresponsible principles are always right, but who are unpronounced upon little, local, and special questions." That was not meant in criticism; the reporter thought him "one of the most law-observing, conservative, neighborhood constructions of manhood we know".

Despite his history with the Know-Nothings, near the end of his life, Orth stood as one of a small number of congressmen defending racial equality. He condemned the racial discrimination of the first Chinese Exclusion Act (1882), declaring that he would vote against the bill because "I am opposed to all legislation founded on 'race, color, or previous condition of servitude.' We have no such odious laws now upon our statute-book, and no vote of mine shall ever be given to place any there."

=== Retirement ===
After his retirement from the House, Orth was appointed Envoy Extraordinary and Minister Plenipotentiary to Austria. He resigned in the late spring of 1876, having been nominated in February for governor by the Republican party. Members of the reform wing distrusted Orth automatically, because he stood well with Senator Oliver Morton's political machine, and they doubted his personal integrity. They were strengthened in their suspicions when a newspaper charged him with participating in a ring of speculators that shook down Venezuelan claimants in disputes between injured parties in Venezuela and the United States and with lobbying the Congress to confirm those claims.

With the ex-Congressman refusing to make a full explanation or convincing denial and with rumors of incriminating letters waiting to be released in what promised to be a hot campaign, Morton withdrew his public support. On August 2, Orth withdrew as candidate for governor, and was replaced by Benjamin Harrison.

=== Family ===
Orth was married twice, and had a daughter and two sons.

=== Death and burial ===
He died in office in December 1882 in Lafayette, Indiana, just after losing a re-election bid to Thomas B. Ward, and is interred at Greenbush Cemetery in that city.

== See also ==
- List of members of the United States Congress who died in office (1790–1899)

== Notes ==
U.S. House of Representatives
Preceded by Albert S. White	Member of the U.S. House of Representatives from Indiana's 8th congressional district March 4, 1863 – March 3, 1869	Succeeded by James N. Tyner
Preceded by Henry D. Washburn	Member of the U.S. House of Representatives from Indiana's 7th congressional district March 4, 1869 – March 3, 1871	Succeeded by Mahlon D. Manson
Preceded by District inactive	Member of the U.S. House of Representatives from Indiana's at-large congressional district March 4, 1873 – March 3, 1875 (obsolete district)	Succeeded by District inactive
Preceded by Michael D. White	Member of the U.S. House of Representatives from Indiana's 9th congressional district March 4, 1879 – December 16, 1882	Succeeded by Charles T. Doxey
Diplomatic posts
Preceded by John Jay	United States Ambassador to Austria-Hungary; March 9, 1875 – March 10, 1876	Succeeded by Edward F. Beale
