= Charles T. Doxey =

American politician

Charles Doxey
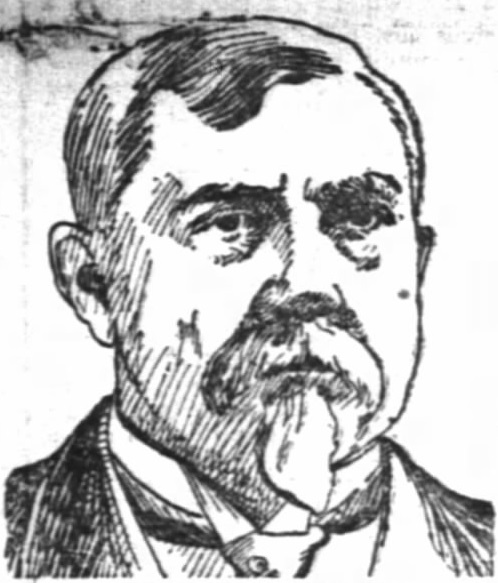

Member of the U.S. House of Representatives from Indiana's 9th district
- In office January 17, 1883 – March 3, 1883
- Preceded by: Godlove S. Orth
- Succeeded by: Thomas B. Ward

Personal details
- Born: July 13, 1841 Tippecanoe County, Indiana, U.S.
- Died: April 30, 1898 (aged 56) Anderson, Indiana, U.S.
- Resting place: Maplewood Cemetery, Indiana, U.S.
- Party: Republican

Charles Taylor Doxey (July 13, 1841 – April 30, 1898) was an American Civil War veteran who served for just over six weeks as a U.S. representative from Indiana in 1883.

== Biography ==
Born in Tippecanoe County, Indiana, Doxey moved with his mother to Minnesota in 1855 and worked on a farm. Later moved to Fairbury, Illinois, where he attended the public schools. He moved to Anderson, Indiana.

=== Civil War ===
He entered the service as first sergeant of Company A, Nineteenth Regiment, Indiana Volunteer Infantry, in July 1861. He was promoted to second lieutenant, subsequently resigned, and then became captain of Company K, Sixteenth Indiana Infantry.

=== Post-war career ===
He engaged in the manufacture of staves and headings. He served as member of the Indiana State Senate in 1876. He served as member of the board of directors in the first natural-gas companies of Anderson.

=== Congress ===
Doxey was elected as a Republican to the Forty-seventh Congress to fill the vacancy caused by the death of Godlove S. Orth and served from January 17 to March 3, 1883. He was an unsuccessful candidate for election in 1884 to the Forty-ninth Congress.

=== Later career and death ===
He resumed former business activities. He died in Anderson, Indiana, April 30, 1898. He was interred in Maplewood Cemetery.

U.S. House of Representatives
Preceded by Godlove S. Orth	Member of the U.S. House of Representatives from Indiana's 9th congressional district January 17, 1883 – March 3, 1883	Succeeded by Thomas B. Ward
