= Gustavus Sessinghaus =

American politician (1838–1887)

Member of the U.S. House of Representatives from Missouri's 3rd district
- In office March 2, 1883 – March 3, 1883
- Preceded by: Richard Graham Frost
- Succeeded by: Alexander M. Dockery

Personal details
- Born: November 8, 1838 Köln (Cologne), North Rhine-Westphalia
- Died: November 16, 1887 (aged 49) St. Louis, Missouri
- Party: Republican

Gustavus Sessinghaus (November 8, 1838 – November 16, 1887) was a U.S. representative from the State of Missouri.

Sessinghaus was born on November 8, 1838 in Köln (Cologne), North Rhine-Westphalia, then part of Prussia. After pursuing preparatory studies in Germany, he immigrated to the United States and settled in St. Louis, Missouri, a city with a majority German speaking population, where he worked in the milling business. During the Civil War, he served as a private in Company A, Fifth Regiment, of the United States Reserve Corps, Missouri Volunteer Infantry. After the war, Sessinghaus became politically active as a member of the Republican Party. From 1878 to 1880 he served as a member of the St. Louis School Board.

In the 1880 congressional election, he was defeated by Democrat Richard Graham Frost in Missouri's third district. Sessinghaus, however, appealed against the outcome of the election. Congress did not decide in his favor until the penultimate day of the legislative period, on March 2, 1883. Thus, he was only able to serve in the Forty-seventh Congress for two days (March 2, 1883 – March 3, 1883). He was an unsuccessful candidate for reelection to the Forty-eighth Congress. After leaving the U.S. House of Representatives, Sessinghaus continued his work as a miller. He died in St. Louis, Missouri, on November 16, 1887, and was interred at Bellefontaine Cemetery.

U.S. House of Representatives
| Preceded by Richard Graham Frost | Member of the U.S. House of Representatives from Missouri's 3rd congressional district 1883 | Succeeded by Alexander M. Dockery |
