= R. Graham Frost =

American politician (1851–1900)

Richard Graham Frost
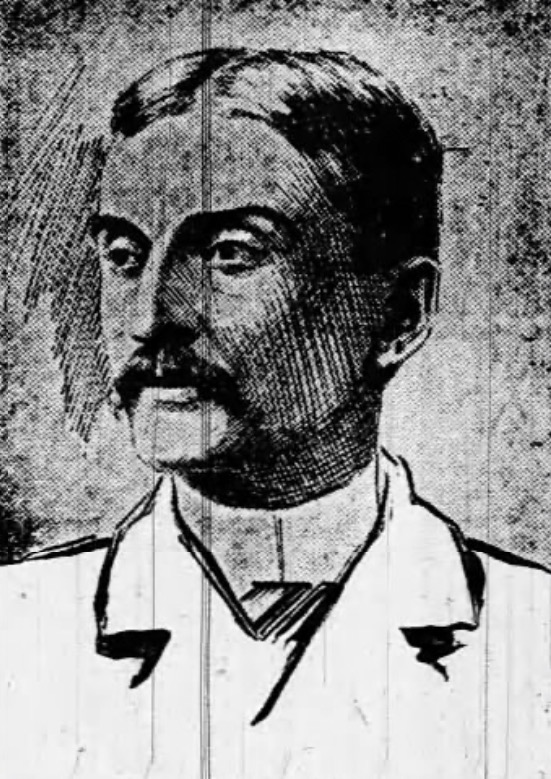
- Graham in a 1900 publican of the St. Louis Globe-Democrat

Member of the U.S. House of Representatives from Missouri's 3rd district
- In office March 4, 1879 – March 3, 1883
- Preceded by: Lyne Metcalfe
- Succeeded by: Gustavus Sessinghaus

Personal details
- Born: December 29, 1851 St. Louis, Missouri, US
- Died: February 1, 1900 (aged 48) St. Louis, Missouri, US
- Resting place: Cavalry Cemetery
- Party: Democratic
- Relations: Daniel M. Frost (father); John Mullanphy (great-grandfather)

Richard Graham Frost (December 29, 1851 – February 1, 1900) was an American politician. A Democrat, he was a member of the United States House of Representatives from Missouri.

== Biography ==
Frost was born on December 29, 1851, in Hazelwood, Missouri, the eldest of nine children born to military officer Daniel M. Frost. His great-grandfather was merchant John Mullanphy. He studied at the Saint Louis University School of Law, St. John's University, and the University of London. He was admitted to the bar, after which he practiced law in St. Louis.

A Democrat, Frost represented Missouri's 3rd district in the United States House of Representatives, from March 4, 1879, to March 3, 1883; he did not take the oath for the 46th Congress and remained a member-elect. He was a member of the Committee on Financial Services during his tenure. On April 21, 1879, he sponsored legislation to establish the Oklahoma Territory. His first election, where he won against Lyne Metcalfe, was contested be Frost. He lost his re-election to Gustavus Sessinghaus.

After serving in Congress, Frost returned to practicing law in St. Louis. He was married to Latty Kennett, and they had five children. He was also Roman Catholic. He died on February 1, 1900, aged 48, in St. Louis. He was buried in Calvary Cemetery.

U.S. House of Representatives
Preceded by Lyne Metcalfe	Member of the U.S. House of Representatives from Missouri's 3rd congressional district 1879-1883	Succeeded by Gustavus Sessinghaus
