= 1882 United States House of Representatives elections =

House elections for the 48th U.S. Congress

- November 7, 1882 (Note: Five states held early elections between June 5 and October 10.)

All 325 seats in the United States House of Representatives 163 seats needed for a majority
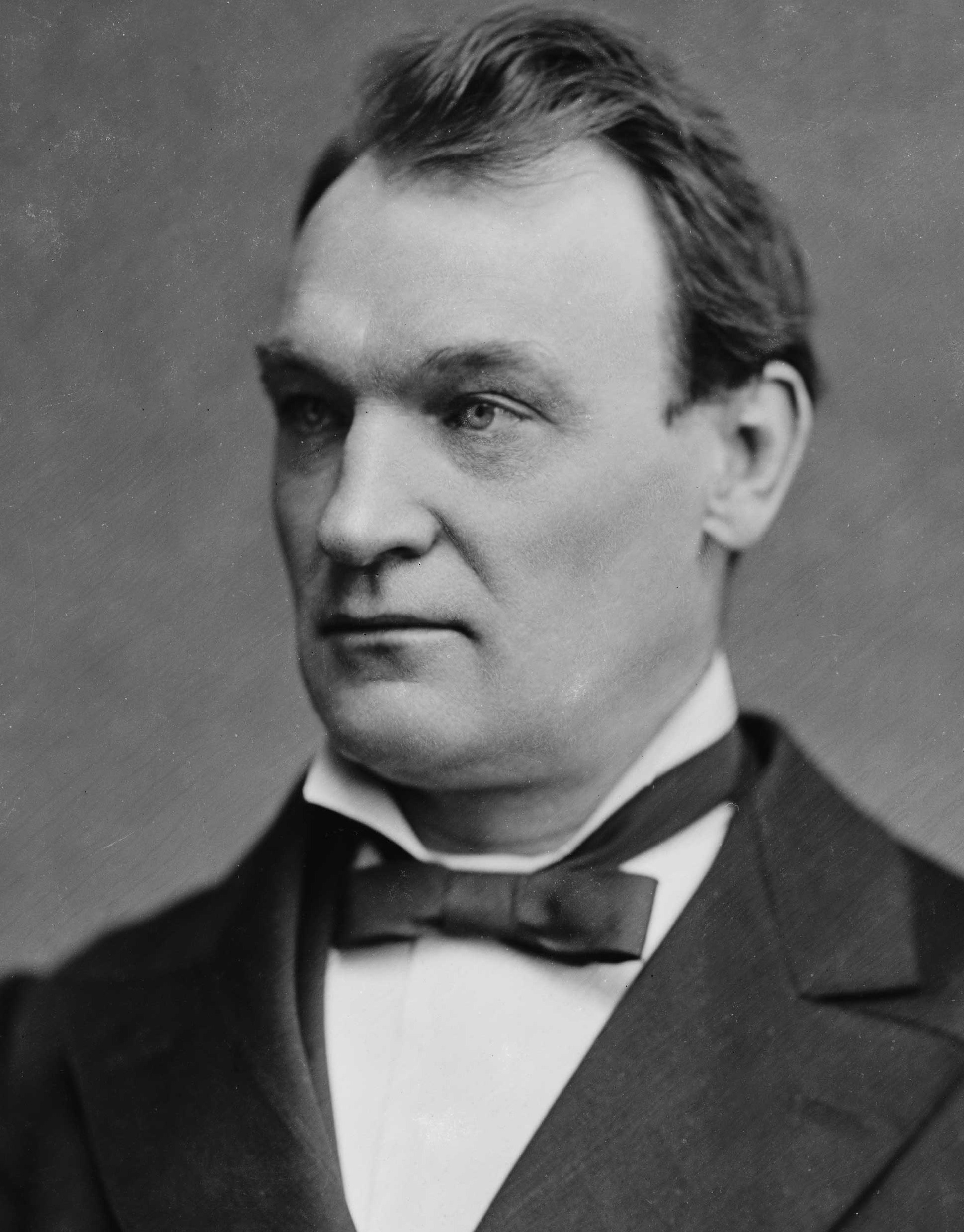

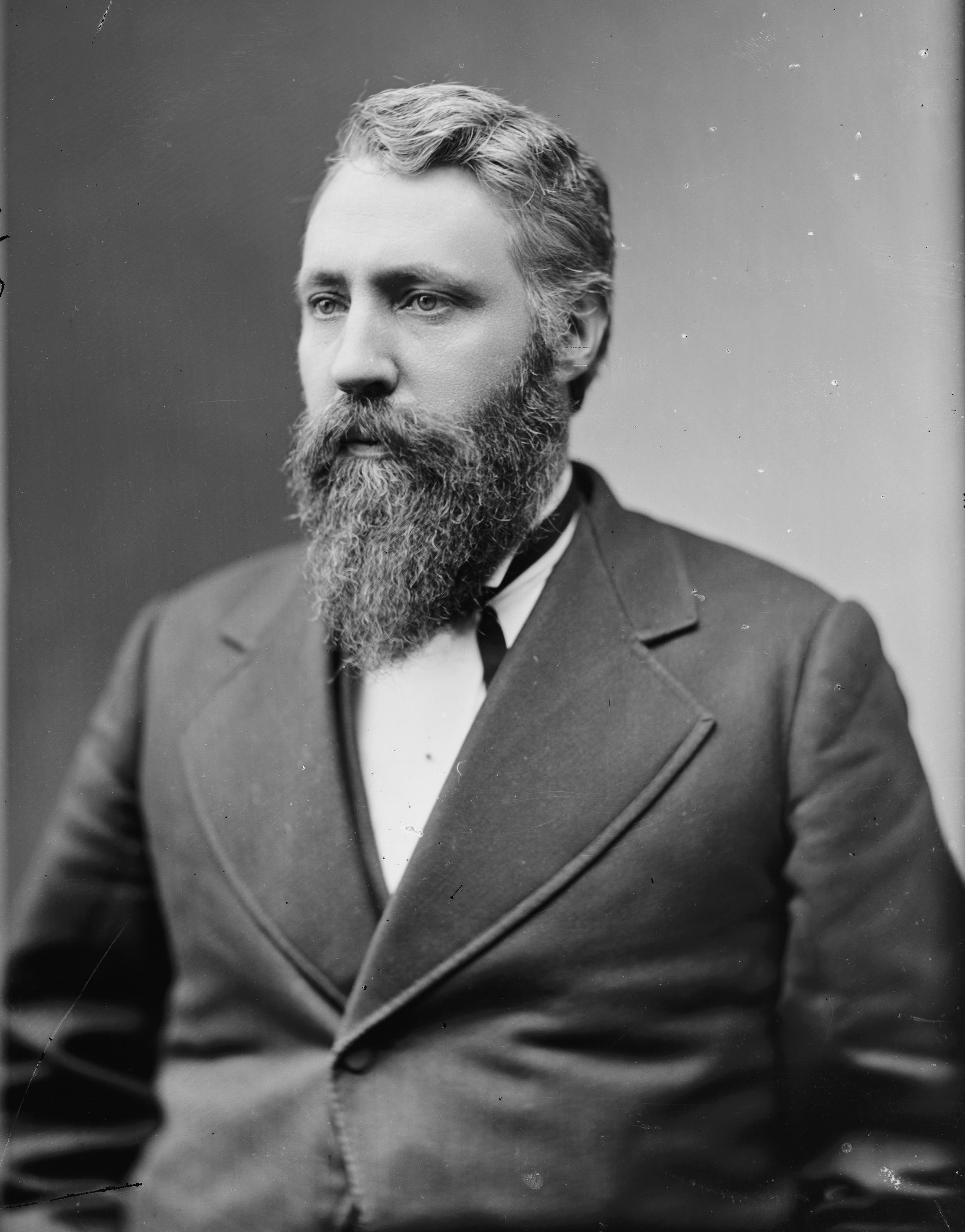
	Majority party	Minority party
Leader	John G. Carlisle	J. Warren Keifer
Party	Democratic	Republican
Leader's seat	Kentucky 6th	Ohio 8th
Last election	128 seats	151 seats
Seats won	196 (Note: Dubin (p. 263) counts 192 Democrats, 5 Readjusters, 2 Independent Democrats, 119 Republicans, 1 Liberal, 2 Greenbacks and 2 Independents (along with 2 vacancies) at the start of the 48th United States Congress.)	117
Seat change	▲68	▼34
Popular vote	3,968,021	3,376,726
Percentage	48.90%	41.61%
Swing	▲1.22pp	▼3.33pp
	Third party	Fourth party
Party	Readjuster	Greenback
Last election	2 seats (Note: There were two "Readjuster Democrats" elected to the previous congress in 1880.)	10 seats
Seats won	4 (Note: Includes 4 Readjusters elected to Virginia's 2nd district, Virginia's 4th district, Virginia's 9th district, and Virginia's at-large seat.)	2
Seat change	▲2	▼8
Popular vote	99,992	248,327
Percentage	1.23%	3.06%
Swing	▲0.61pp	▼2.49pp
	Fifth party	Sixth party
Party	Liberal	Independent
Last election	0 seats	1 seats (Note: Included 1 Independent Democrat.)
Seats won	1 (Note: Tyre York, elected to North Carolina's 7th district.)	5 (Note: Includes 1 Independent Republican, Theodore Lyman, elected to Massachusetts's 9th district.) (Note: Includes 2 Independent Democrats elected to Illinois's 2nd district and Kentucky's 1st district.)
Seat change	▲1	▲4
Popular vote	113,789	282,297
Percentage	1.40%	3.48%
Swing	New party	▲2.38pp
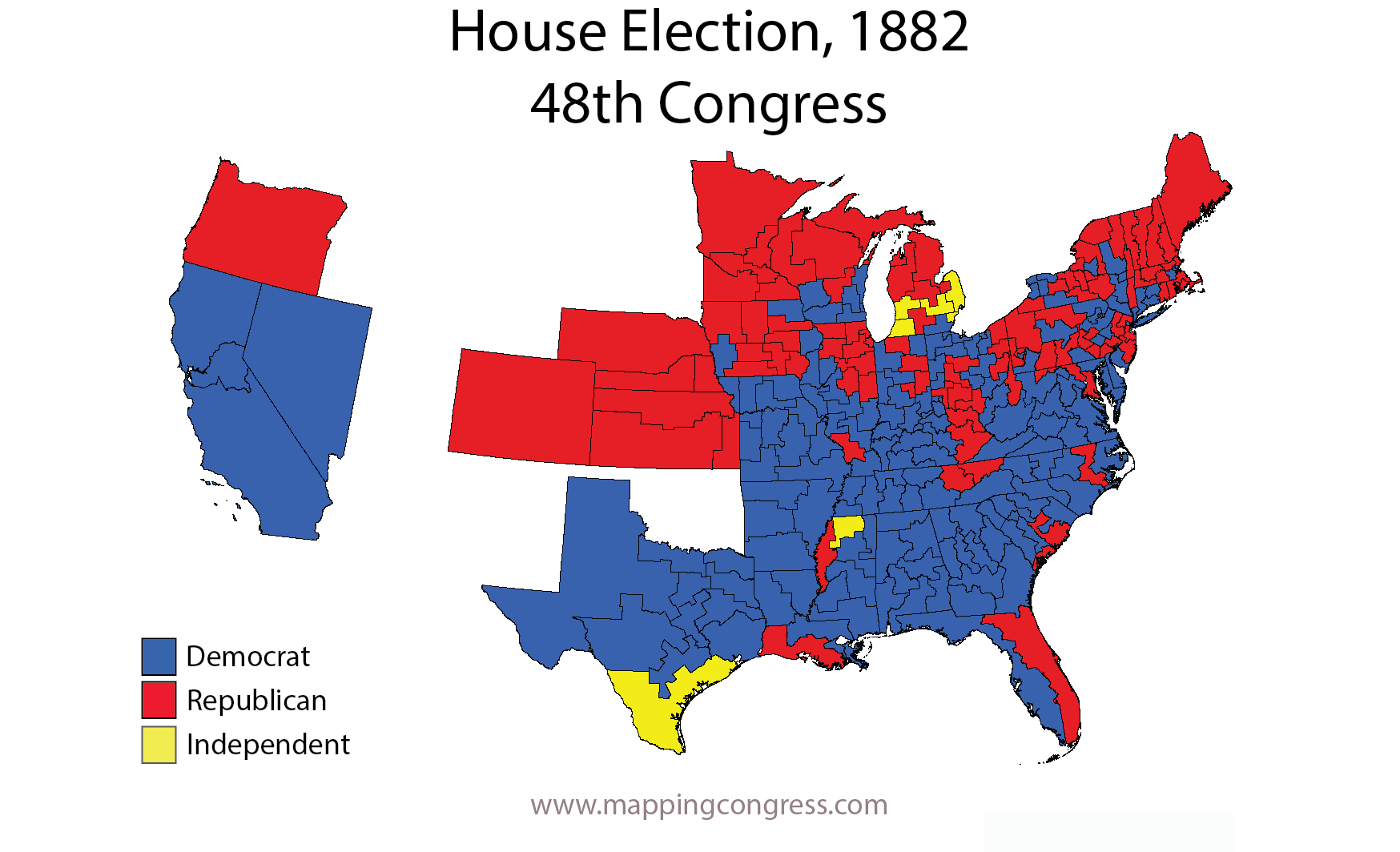
- Elections results from the 1882 elections
Speaker before election
Joseph Keifer
Republican
Elected Speaker
John Carlisle
Democratic

The 1882 United States House of Representatives elections were held for the most part on November 7, 1882, with five states holding theirs early between June and October. They occurred during President Chester A. Arthur's term. Elections were held for 325 seats of the United States House of Representatives, representing 38 states, to serve in the 48th United States Congress. They were the first elections after reapportionment following the 1880 United States census, increasing the size of the House. Special elections were also held throughout the year.

Arthur's Republican Party was badly defeated, losing its majority to the opposition Democratic Party after a campaign that focused on the resistance of Republican leaders to reforming the spoils system under which government jobs were handed to supporters of winning candidates. After the election, Arthur agreed with the Democrats to pass the Pendleton Civil Service Reform Act, establishing a professional civil service. However, his actions were too late, as the image of the Republican Party as corrupt was already engrained in the minds of voters.

This would nonetheless be the last occasion a Republican was elected to the House from Florida until 1954, for the disenfrachisement of almost all blacks in the 1890s would leave that state completely devoid of Republican support until the “Hoovercrat” bolt against Al Smith. This election also saw the decline of the propaper money Greenback Party, and the pick up of several Virginian seats by the Readjuster Party which promoted fiscal responsibility and shunned elitism, though the Virginia-based Readjuster Party all but disappeared following this election and fused with the state Republican Party.

== Election summaries ==
Following the 1880 census, 32 new seats were apportioned. Three States lost 1 seat each, 13 States had no change in apportionment, 14 States gained 1 seat each, 6 States gained 2 seats, 1 State gained 4 seats, and 1 State gained 5 seats. Several States that gained one or more seats did not redistrict immediately, electing the new members at-large, while one state (Maine) which lost a member also delayed redistricting, electing all of its members at-large for this Congress only.

↓
196	12	117
Democratic	(Note: Readjusters had 4 seats, Independent Democrats had 3, Greenbacks had 2, Independents had 2, and Independent Republicans had 1.)	Republican

State	Type	Total seats		Democratic		Republican		Others	
State	Type	Seats	Change	Seats	Change	Seats	Change	Seats	Change
Alabama	District	8	Steady	7	▲1	1	Steady	0	Steady
Arkansas	District + at-large (Note: New seat or seats added without immediate redistricting.)	5	▲1	5	▲1	0	Steady	0	Steady
California	District + 2 at-large	6	▲2	6	▲4	0	▼2	0	Steady
Colorado	At-large	1	Steady	0	Steady	1	Steady	0	Steady
Connecticut	District	4	Steady	3	▲2	1	▼2	0	Steady
Delaware	At-large	1	Steady	1	Steady	0	Steady	0	Steady
Florida	District	2	Steady	1	Steady	1	Steady	0	Steady
Georgia	District + at-large	10	▲1	10	▲1	0	Steady	0	Steady
Illinois	District	20	▲1	9 (Note: Includes 1 Independent Democrat.)	▲3	11	▼2	0	Steady
Indiana	District	13	Steady	10	▲5	3	▼5	0	Steady
Iowa (Note: Elections held early.)	District	11	▲2	3	▲2	7	▼1	1 (Note: Greenback Party)	▲1
Kansas	District + 4 at-large	7	▲4	0	Steady	7	▲4	0	Steady
Kentucky	District	11	▲1	9	Steady	2	▲1	0	Steady
Louisiana	District	6	Steady	5	Steady	1	Steady	0	Steady
Maine	At-large (Note: Changed from districts.)	4	▼1	0	Steady	4	▲1	0	▼2
Maryland	District	6	Steady	4	▼1	2	▲1	0	Steady
Massachusetts	District	12	▲1	3	▲2	9	▼1	0	Steady
Michigan	District	11	▲2	6	▲6	5	▼4	0	Steady
Minnesota	District	5	▲2	0	Steady	5	▲2	0	Steady
Mississippi	District	7	▲1	5	▼1	1	▲1	1 (Note: Independent)	▲1
Missouri	District	14	▲1	14	▲6	0	▼1	0	▼4
Nebraska	District (Note: Changed from at-large.)	3	▲2	0	Steady	3	▲2	0	Steady
Nevada	At-large	1	Steady	1	Steady	0	Steady	0	Steady
New Hampshire	District	2	▼1	0	Steady	2	▼1	0	Steady
New Jersey	District	7	Steady	3	Steady	4	Steady	0	Steady
New York	District + at-large	34	▲1	21	▲1	13	▲1	0	▼1
North Carolina	District + at-large	9	▲1	7	Steady	2	▲1	0	Steady
Ohio	District	21	▲1	15	▲10	6	▼9	0	Steady
Oregon	At-large	1	Steady	0	Steady	1	Steady	0	Steady
Pennsylvania	District + at-large	28	▲1	12	▲5	15	▼3	1	▼1
Rhode Island	District	2	Steady	0	Steady	2	Steady	0	Steady
South Carolina	District	7	▲2	6	▲1	1	▲1	0	Steady
Tennessee	District	10	Steady	8	▲1	2	▼1	0	Steady
Texas	District	11	▲5	10	▲5	0	Steady	1	(Note: Previous election had 1 Greenback.)
Vermont	District	2	▼1	0	Steady	2	▼1	0	Steady
Virginia	District + at-large	10	▲1	6	▼1	0	▼2	4	▲4 (Note: Previous election saw 2 "Readjuster Democrats" elected to Virginia's 7th district and Virginia's 9th district.)
West Virginia	District	4	▲1	3	Steady	1	▲1	0	Steady
Wisconsin	District	9	▲1	6	▲4	3	▼3	0	Steady
Total		325	▲32	199 (Note: Includes 3 Independent Democrats elected to Illinois's 2nd district, Kentucky's 1st district, and North Carolina's 7th district.) 61.2%	▲59	118 36.3%	▼26	8 2.8%	▼2

Popular vote
Democratic	48.90%
Republican	41.61%
Greenback	3.06%
Readjuster	1.23%
Liberal	1.40%
Independent	3.48%
Others	0.32%

House seats
Democratic	60.31%
Republican	36.00%
Readjuster	1.23%
Greenback	0.61%
Liberal	0.31%
Independent	1.54%

There were 8 members elected from third parties, 4 from the Virginia-based Readjuster Party, 2 from the declining Greenback Party, and 2 Independents. The previous election of 1880 had had 10 Greenbacks and 1 Independent.

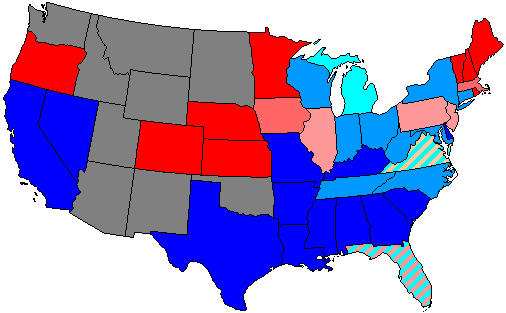
House seats by party holding plurality in state: 80+% Democratic / / 80+% Republican; 60+ to 80% Democratic / / 60+ to 80% Republican; Up to 60% Democratic / Up to 60% Readjuster / Up to 60% Republican

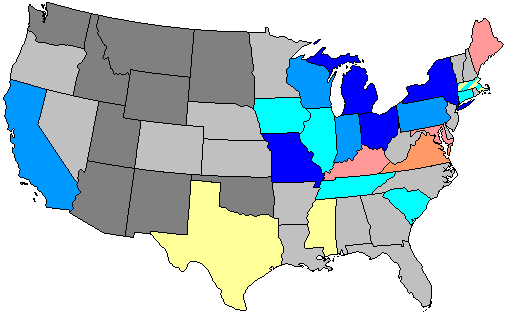
Net gain in party representation: 6+ Democratic gain / / 6+ Republican gain; 3-5 Democratic gain / 3-5 Readjuster gain / 3-5 Republican gain; 1-2 Democratic gain / 1-2 Independent gain / 1-2 Republican gain; no net change

== Early election dates ==
Five states, with 39 seats among them, held elections before the others:

- June 5, 1882: Oregon
- September 5, 1882: Vermont
- September 8, 1882: Maine
- October 10, 1882: Iowa and Ohio

== Special elections ==
There were four special elections in 1882 during the 47th United States Congress.

Elections are listed by date and district.

District	Incumbent			This race	
District	Member / Delegate	Party	First elected	Results	Candidates
Missouri 2	Thomas Allen	Democratic	1880	Incumbent died April 8, 1882. New member elected November 7, 1882 and seated December 15, 1882. Republican gain. Winner lost election to the next term in the 9th district; see below.	▌ ✓ James H. McLean (Republican) 49.45%; ▌James Broadhead (Democratic) 48.39%; ▌Britton A. Hill (Independent) 2.17%
Illinois 5	Robert M. A. Hawk	Republican	1878	Incumbent died June 29, 1882. New member elected November 7, 1882 and seated December 4, 1882. Republican hold.	▌ ✓ Robert R. Hitt (Republican) 59.97%; ▌Larmont G. Johnson (Democratic) 39.27%
Utah Territory at-large	George Q. Cannon	Republican	1872	Incumbent disqualified on account of polygamy. New delegate elected November 7, 1882 and seated December 4, 1882. Democratic gain. Winner also elected to the next term; see below.	▌ ✓ John T. Caine (Democratic) 100%; Uncontested
Georgia 8	Alexander H. Stephens	Democratic	1842; 1859 (withdrew); 1872	Incumbent resigned November 4, 1882 to become Governor of Georgia. New member elected November 8, 1882 and seated December 4, 1882. Democratic hold. Winner also elected to the next term.	▌ ✓ Seaborn Reese (Democratic) 100%; Uncontested

== Alabama ==
District	Incumbent			This race	
District	Member	Party	First elected	Results	Candidates
Alabama 1	Thomas H. Herndon	Democratic	1878	Incumbent re-elected.	▌ ✓ Thomas H. Herndon (Democratic) 57.4%; ▌Luther R. Smith (Republican) 42.6%
Alabama 2	Hilary A. Herbert	Democratic	1876	Incumbent re-elected.	▌ ✓ Hilary A. Herbert (Democratic) 58.4%; ▌Samuel F. Rice (Republican) 41.6%
Alabama 3	William C. Oates	Democratic	1880	Incumbent re-elected.	▌ ✓ William C. Oates (Democratic) 87.8%; ▌George R. Millen (Republican) 12.2%
Alabama 4	Vacant			Charles M. Shelley (D) resigned July 20, 1882 after election contest. Democratic hold.	▌ ✓ Charles M. Shelley (Democratic) 60.9%; ▌George H. Craig (Republican) 37.7%; ▌Merrick Howze (Independent) 1.3%
Alabama 4	Vacant			Election successfully contested. New member seated January 9, 1885. Republican gain.	▌ ✓ George H. Craig (Republican); [data missing]
Alabama 5	Thomas Williams	Democratic	1878	Incumbent re-elected.	▌ ✓ Thomas Williams (Democratic) 62.1%; ▌Henry R. McCoy (Independent) 37.9%
Alabama 6	Goldsmith W. Hewitt	Democratic	1880	Incumbent re-elected.	▌ ✓ Goldsmith W. Hewitt (Democratic) 72.4%; ▌John N. Carpenter (Greenback) 27.6%
Alabama 7	William H. Forney	Democratic	1874	Incumbent re-elected.	▌ ✓ William H. Forney (Democratic) 80.6%; ▌Arthur Bingham (Republican) 19.4%
Alabama 8	Vacant			Rep. William M. Lowe (G) died October 12, 1882. Democratic gain.	▌ ✓ Luke Pryor (Democratic) 51.6%; ▌David D. Shelby (Republican) 48.4%

== Arkansas ==
District	Incumbent			This race	
District	Member	Party	First elected	Results	Candidates
Arkansas 1	Poindexter Dunn	Democratic	1878	Incumbent re-elected.	▌ ✓ Poindexter Dunn (Democratic) 94.6%; ▌J. B. Miles (Republican) 5.4%
Arkansas 2	James K. Jones	Democratic	1880	Incumbent re-elected.	▌ ✓ James K. Jones (Democratic) 56.3%; ▌John A. Williams (Republican) 43.7%
Arkansas 3	Jordan E. Cravens	Democratic	1876	Incumbent lost renomination. Democratic hold.	▌ ✓ John H. Rogers (Democratic) 57.3%; ▌John A. Williams (Republican) 42.7%
Arkansas 4	Thomas M. Gunter	Democratic	1872	Incumbent retired. Democratic hold.	▌ ✓ Samuel W. Peel (Democratic) 84.9%; ▌Truman Niman (Republican) 15.1%
Arkansas at-large	None (new seat)			New seat. Democratic gain.	▌ ✓ Clifton R. Breckinridge (Democratic) 67.1%; ▌Charles E. Cunningham (Republican) 32.9%

== California ==
District	Incumbent			This race	
District	Member	Party	First elected	Results	Candidates
California 1	William Rosecrans	Democratic	1880	Incumbent re-elected.	▌ ✓ William Rosecrans (Democratic) 59.5%; ▌Paul Neuman (Republican) 38.8%; Others: ▌James McMillan Shafter (Prohibition) 1.5%; ▌H. S. Fitch (Greenback) 0.2%
California 2	Horace F. Page	Republican	1872	Incumbent lost re-election. Democratic gain.	▌ ✓ James Budd (Democratic) 50.5%; ▌Horace F. Page (Republican) 48.1%; Others: ▌J. L. Coles (Prohibition) 1.2%; ▌F. J. Woodward (Greenback) 0.2%
California 3	Campbell P. Berry	Democratic	1879	Incumbent retired. Democratic hold.	▌ ✓ Barclay Henley (Democratic) 51.3%; ▌John J. De Haven (Republican) 45.8%; Others: ▌H. S. Graves (Prohibition) 2.0%; ▌W. O. Howe (Greenback) 0.9%
California 4	Romualdo Pacheco	Republican	1876	Incumbent retired. Democratic gain.	▌ ✓ Pleasant B. Tully (Democratic) 54.4%; ▌George L. Woods (Republican) 43.3%; Others: ▌M. V. Wright (Prohibition) 1.5%; ▌Isaac Kinley (Greenback) 0.8%
California at-large 2 seats on a general ticket	None (new seat)			New seat. Democratic gain.	▌ ✓ John R. Glascock (Democratic) 26.5%; ▌ ✓ Charles A. Sumner (Democratic) 26.5%; ▌William W. Morrow (Republican) 22.4%; ▌Henry Edgerton (Republican) 22.3%; Others: ▌A. B. Hotchkiss (Prohibition) 0.8%; ▌Jesse Yarnell (Prohibition) 0.8%; ▌Warren Chase (Greenback) 0.3%; ▌Stephen Maybell (Greenback) 0.3%
California at-large 2 seats on a general ticket	None (new seat)			New seat. Democratic gain.	▌ ✓ John R. Glascock (Democratic) 26.5%; ▌ ✓ Charles A. Sumner (Democratic) 26.5%; ▌William W. Morrow (Republican) 22.4%; ▌Henry Edgerton (Republican) 22.3%; Others: ▌A. B. Hotchkiss (Prohibition) 0.8%; ▌Jesse Yarnell (Prohibition) 0.8%; ▌Warren Chase (Greenback) 0.3%; ▌Stephen Maybell (Greenback) 0.3%

== Colorado ==
District	Incumbent			This race	
District	Member	Party	First elected	Results	Candidates
Colorado at-large	James B. Belford	Republican	1878	Incumbent re-elected.	▌ ✓ James B. Belford (Republican) 50.5%; ▌S. S. Wallace (Democratic) 47.6%; ▌Leland W. Green (Greenback) 2.0%

== Connecticut ==
District	Incumbent			This race	
District	Member	Party	First elected	Results	Candidates
Connecticut 1	John R. Buck	Republican	1880	Incumbent lost re-election. Democratic gain.	▌ ✓ William W. Eaton (Democratic) 50.7%; ▌John R. Buck (Republican) 48.3%; Others: ▌Ellsworth N. Phelps (Greenback) 0.7%; ▌Philo W. Thompson (Prohibition) 0.2%
Connecticut 2	James Phelps	Democratic	1875	Incumbent retired. Democratic hold.	▌ ✓ Charles L. Mitchell (Democratic) 51.9%; ▌Samuel E. Merwin (Republican) 47.1%; Others: ▌Otis J. Range (Prohibition) 0.5%; ▌Ami B. Barker (Greenback) 0.4%
Connecticut 3	John T. Wait	Republican	1876 (special)	Incumbent re-elected.	▌ ✓ John T. Wait (Republican) 53.4%; ▌John J. Penrose (Democratic) 44.5%; Others: ▌Elisha H. Palmer (Prohibition) 1.6%; ▌Franklin P. Kenyon (Greenback) 0.5%
Connecticut 4	Frederick Miles	Republican	1878	Incumbent retired. Democratic gain.	▌ ✓ Edward W. Seymour (Democratic) 51.8%; ▌Lyman W. Coe (Republican) 47.0%; Others: ▌Abel S. Beardsley (Prohibition) 0.8%; ▌Lucien V. Pinney (Greenback) 0.3%

== Delaware ==
District	Incumbent			This race	
District	Member	Party	First elected	Results	Candidates
Delaware at-large	Edward L. Martin	Democratic	1878	Incumbent retired. Democratic hold.	▌ ✓ Charles B. Lore (Democratic) 53.1%; ▌Washington Hastings (Republican) 46.9%

== Florida ==
District	Incumbent			This race	
District	Member	Party	First elected	Results	Candidates
Florida 1	Robert H. M. Davidson	Democratic	1876	Incumbent re-elected.	▌ ✓ Robert H. M. Davidson (Democratic) 51.5%; ▌Emory F. Skinner (Republican) 32.2%; ▌D. L. McKinnon (Independent Republican) 16.3%
Florida 2	Horatio Bisbee Jr.	Republican	1880 (Note: Seated after successful electoral challenge.)	Incumbent re-elected.	▌ ✓ Horatio Bisbee Jr. (Republican) 50.5%; ▌Jesse J. Finley (Democratic) 49.5%

== Georgia ==
District	Incumbent			This race	
District	Member	Party	First elected	Results	Candidates
Georgia 1	George R. Black	Democratic	1880	Incumbent lost renomination Democratic hold.	▌ ✓ John C. Nicholls (Democratic) 60.4%; ▌James Atkins (Republican) 39.6%
Georgia 2	Henry G. Turner	Democratic	1880	Incumbent re-elected.	▌ ✓ Henry G. Turner (Democratic) 63.9%; ▌Charles Wessolowsky (Republican) 36.1%
Georgia 3	Philip Cook	Democratic	1872	Incumbent retired. Democratic hold.	▌ ✓ Charles F. Crisp (Democratic) 92.6%; ▌D.B. Harrall (Republican) 7.4%
Georgia 4	Hugh Buchanan	Democratic	1880	Incumbent re-elected.	▌ ✓ Hugh Buchanan (Democratic) 78.8%; ▌Joseph F. Pou (Independent) 21.2%
Georgia 5	Nathaniel J. Hammond	Democratic	1878	Incumbent re-elected.	▌ ✓ Nathaniel J. Hammond (Democratic) 65.2%; ▌Alfred E. Buck (Republican) 34.8%
Georgia 6	James H. Blount	Democratic	1872	Incumbent re-elected.	▌ ✓ James H. Blount (Democratic) 100%
Georgia 7	Judson C. Clements	Democratic	1878	Incumbent re-elected.	▌ ✓ Judson C. Clements (Democratic) 53.6%; ▌William H. Felton (Ind. Democratic) 46.4%
Georgia 8	Vacant			Incumbent resigned November 4, 1882 after becoming Governor. Democratic hold.	▌ ✓ Seaborn Reese (Democratic) 96%; Others 4%
Georgia 9	Emory Speer	Independent Democratic	1878	Incumbent lost re-election. Democratic gain.	▌ ✓ Allen D. Candler (Democratic) 54%; ▌Emory Speer (Ind. Democratic) 44.3%; ▌FNU Dugar (Unknown) 1.7%
Georgia at-large	None (new seat)			New seat. Democratic gain.	▌ ✓ Thomas Hardeman Jr. (Democratic) 76.6%; ▌Cornelius D. Forsyth (Republican) 23.4%

== Illinois ==
District	Incumbent			This race	
District	Member	Party	First elected	Results	Candidates
Illinois 1	William Aldrich	Republican	1876	Incumbent retired. Republican hold.	▌ ✓ Ransom W. Dunham (Republican) 50.9%; ▌John W. Downes (Democratic) 46.3%; ▌Alonzo J. Glover (Greenback) 2.8%
Illinois 2	None (new seat)			New seat. Ind. Democratic gain.	▌ ✓ John F. Finerty (Ind. Democratic) 56.2%; ▌Henry F. Sheridan (Democratic) 41.6%; ▌J. J. Altpeter (Anti-Monopoly) 1.1%; ▌Sylvester Artley (Socialist Labor) 1.1%
Illinois 3	George R. Davis	Republican	1878	Incumbent re-elected.	▌ ✓ George R. Davis (Republican) 53.2%; ▌William P. Black (Democratic) 43.7%; ▌Caleb G. Hayman (Socialist Labor) 3.2%
Illinois 4	Charles B. Farwell	Republican	1880	Incumbent retired. Republican hold.	▌ ✓ George E. Adams (Republican) 53.3%; ▌Lambert Tree (Democratic) 43.1%; ▌Frank P. Crandon (Prohibition) 3%; ▌Christian Meyer (Socialist Labor) 0.6%
Illinois 5	John C. Sherwin	Republican	1878	Incumbent lost renomination. Republican hold.	▌ ✓ Reuben Ellwood (Republican) 70.7%; ▌William Price (Democratic) 27.9%; ▌Bainbridge N. Dean (Prohibition) 1.5%
Illinois 6	Robert R. Hitt	Republican	1882 Special	Incumbent re-elected.	▌ ✓ Robert R. Hitt (Republican) 57.1%; ▌James Ticknor (Democratic) 40.6%; ▌George W. Curtis (Greenback) 1.9%; ▌W. H. Linn (Unknown) 0.4%
Illinois 7	Thomas J. Henderson	Republican	1874	Incumbent re-elected.	▌ ✓ Thomas J. Henderson (Republican) 61.2%; ▌Larmont G. Johnson (Democratic) 30.6%; ▌M. B. Loyd (Prohibition) 8%; ▌L. G. Morrison (Unknown) 0.3%
Illinois 8	William Cullen	Republican	1880	Incumbent re-elected.	▌ ✓ William Cullen (Republican) 47%; ▌Patrick C. Healey (Democratic) 46.4%; ▌Otis Hardy (Prohibition) 3.5%; ▌Lewis Steward (Greenback) 3.1%; ▌T. W. Baird (Unknown) 0.1%
Illinois 9	Lewis E. Payson	Republican	1880	Incumbent re-elected.	▌ ✓ Lewis E. Payson (Republican) 52.4%; ▌E. B. Buck (Democratic) 38.4%; ▌O. W. Barnard (Greenback) 8.9%; ▌Joseph M. McCullough (Unknown) 0.4%
Illinois 10	John H. Lewis	Republican	1880	Incumbent lost re-election. Democratic gain.	▌ ✓ Nicholas E. Worthington (Democratic) 48.3%; ▌John H. Lewis (Republican) 46.9%; ▌Matthew H. Mitchell (Greenback) 4.8%
Illinois 11	Benjamin F. Marsh	Republican	1876	Incumbent lost re-election. Democratic gain.	▌ ✓ William H. Neece (Democratic) 45.3%; ▌Benjamin F. Marsh (Republican) 43.3%; ▌Richard "Uncle Dick" Haney (Prohibition) 11.4%
Illinois 12	James W. Singleton	Democratic	1878	Incumbent lost re-election. Democratic hold.	▌ ✓ James M. Riggs (Democratic) 49.1%; ▌James W. Singleton (Ind. Democratic) 37.7%; ▌Philip N. Minier (Prohibition) 13.2%
Illinois 13	William M. Springer	Democratic	1874	Incumbent re-elected.	▌ ✓ William M. Springer (Democratic) 54.4%; ▌Dietrich C. Smith (Republican) 41.6%; ▌H. M. Miller (Prohibition) 4%
Illinois 13	Dietrich C. Smith	Republican	1878	Incumbent lost re-election. Republican loss.	▌ ✓ William M. Springer (Democratic) 54.4%; ▌Dietrich C. Smith (Republican) 41.6%; ▌H. M. Miller (Prohibition) 4%
Illinois 14	None (new seat)			New seat. Republican gain.	▌ ✓ Jonathan H. Rowell (Republican) 48.8%; ▌Adlai Stevenson I (Democratic) 46.7%; ▌David H. Harts (Prohibition) 4.5%
Illinois 15	Joseph G. Cannon	Republican	1872	Incumbent re-elected.	▌ ✓ Joseph G. Cannon (Republican) 51.1%; ▌Andrew J. Hunter (Democratic) 47.1%; ▌John C. Barnes (Prohibition) 1.8%
Illinois 16	None (new seat)			New seat. Democratic gain.	▌ ✓ Aaron Shaw (Democratic) 50.7%; ▌Edward B. Green (Republican) 47.7%; ▌Daniel B. Tourney (Prohibition) 1.6%
Illinois 17	Samuel W. Moulton	Democratic	1880	Incumbent re-elected.	▌ ✓ Samuel W. Moulton (Democratic) 55.9%; ▌William H. Barlow (Republican) 38.8%; ▌B. W. Corley (Prohibition) 5.3%
Illinois 18	William Ralls Morrison	Democratic	1872	Incumbent re-elected.	▌ ✓ William Ralls Morrison (Democratic) 52.2%; ▌William Kueffner (Republican) 44%; ▌Thomas W. Hynes (Prohibition) 3.8%
Illinois 19	Richard W. Townshend	Democratic	1876	Incumbent re-elected.	▌ ✓ Richard W. Townshend (Democratic) 60.7%; ▌George C. Ross (Republican) 38.6%; ▌Edward B. Green (Unknown) 0.7%
Illinois 19	William A. J. Sparks	Democratic	1874	Incumbent retired. Democratic loss.	▌ ✓ Richard W. Townshend (Democratic) 60.7%; ▌George C. Ross (Republican) 38.6%; ▌Edward B. Green (Unknown) 0.7%
Illinois 20	John R. Thomas	Republican	1878	Incumbent re-elected.	▌ ✓ John R. Thomas (Republican) 49%; ▌William K. Murphy (Democratic) 47.6%; ▌John F. McCartney (Prohibition) 3.4%

== Indiana ==
District	Incumbent			This race	
District	Member	Party	First elected	Results	Candidates
Indiana 1	William Heilman	Republican	1878	Incumbent lost re-election. Democratic hold.	▌ ✓ John J. Kleiner (Democratic) 51.6%; ▌ William Heilman (Republican) 46.9%; ▌ [FNU] Nesmith (Greenback) 1.5%
Indiana 2	Thomas R. Cobb	Democratic	1876	Incumbent re-elected.	▌ ✓ Thomas R. Cobb (Democratic) 55.1%; ▌ A. J. Hostetter (Republican) 44.8%
Indiana 3	Strother M. Stockslager	Democratic	1880	Incumbent re-elected.	▌ ✓ Strother M. Stockslager (Democratic) 56.2%; ▌ Will T. Walker (Republican) 41.2%; ▌ [FNU] Greene (Greenback) 2.6%
Indiana 4	William S. Holman	Democratic	1880	Incumbent re-elected.	▌ ✓ William S. Holman (Democratic) 55.4%; ▌ W. J. Johnson (Republican) 43.8%; ▌ [FNU] Thomas (Greenback) 0.8%
Indiana 5	Courtland C. Matson	Democratic	1880	Incumbent re-elected.	▌ ✓ Courtland C. Matson (Democratic) 55.9%; ▌ [FNU] Wallingford (Greenback/Republican) 44.1%
Indiana 6	Thomas M. Browne	Republican	1876	Incumbent re-elected.	▌ ✓ Thomas M. Browne (Republican) 60.1%; ▌ J. L. Pender (Democratic) 37.6%; ▌ [FNU] Smith (Greenback) 2.3%
Indiana 7	Stanton J. Peelle	Republican	1880	Incumbent re-elected.	▌ ✓ Stanton J. Peelle (Republican) 49.4%; ▌ William E. English (Democratic) 49.1%; ▌ Robert W. Medkrik (Greenback) 1.5%
Indiana 7	Stanton J. Peelle	Republican	1880	Election successfully contested. New member seated May 22, 1884. Democratic gain.	▌ ✓ William E. English (Democratic) 49.6%; ▌ Stanton J. Peelle (Republican) 48.9%; ▌ Robert W. Medkrik (Greenback) 1.5%
Indiana 8	Robert B. F. Peirce	Republican	1880	Incumbent lost re-election. Democratic gain.	▌ ✓ John E. Lamb (Democratic) 47.9%; ▌ Robert B. F. Peirce (Republican) 47.2%; ▌ [FNU] Copner (Greenback) 4.9%
Indiana 9	Godlove S. Orth	Republican	1878	Incumbent lost re-election. Democratic hold.	▌ ✓ Thomas B. Ward (Democratic) 49.7%; ▌ Godlove S. Orth (Republican) 47.2%; ▌ [FNU] Jacks (Greenback) 3.1%
Indiana 10	Mark L. De Motte	Republican	1880	Incumbent lost re-election. Democratic hold.	▌ ✓ Thomas Jefferson Wood (Democratic) 49.5%; ▌ Mark L. De Motte (Republican) 46.6%; ▌ [FNU] Moore (Greenback) 3.9%
Indiana 11	George Washington Steele	Republican	1880	Incumbent re-elected.	▌ ✓ George Washington Steele (Republican) 48.6%; ▌ Joseph S. Dailey (Democratic) 47.6%; ▌ [FNU] Thompson (Greenback) 3.8%
Indiana 12	Walpole G. Colerick	Democratic	1878	Incumbent retired. Democratic hold.	▌ ✓ Robert Lowry (Democratic) 54.4%; ▌ W. C. Glasgow (Republican) 43.6%
Indiana 13	William H. Calkins	Republican	1876	Incumbent re-elected.	▌ ✓ William H. Calkins (Republican) 47.9%; ▌ J. H. Winterbotham (Democratic) 46.8%; ▌ [FNU] Shively (Greenback) 5.3%

== Iowa ==
District	Incumbent			This race	
District	Member	Party	First elected	Results	Candidates
Iowa 1	Moses A. McCoid	Republican	1878	Incumbent re-elected.	▌ ✓ Moses A. McCoid (Republican) 48.1%; ▌ Benton Jay Hall (Democratic) 47.3%; ▌ [FNU] Sater (Greenback) 4.6%
Iowa 2	Sewall S. Farwell	Republican	1880	Incumbent lost re-election. Democratic gain.	▌ ✓ Jeremiah H. Murphy (Democratic) 54.6%; ▌ Sewall S. Farwell (Republican) 43.5%; ▌ [FNU] Bartlett (Greenback) 1.9%
Iowa 3	None (new district)			New seat. Republican gain.	▌ ✓ David B. Henderson (Republican) 50.4%; ▌ C. M. Durham (Democratic) 45.3%; ▌ [FNU] Foster (Greenback) 4.3%
Iowa 4	Thomas Updegraff; Redistricted from the 3rd district	Republican	1878	Incumbent lost re-election. Greenback gain.	▌ ✓ Luman Hamlin Weller (Greenback/Democratic) 51.5%; ▌ Thomas Updegraff (Republican) 48.3%
Iowa 4	Nathaniel Cobb Deering	Republican	1876	Incumbent retired. Republican loss.	▌ ✓ Luman Hamlin Weller (Greenback/Democratic) 51.5%; ▌ Thomas Updegraff (Republican) 48.3%
Iowa 5	William George Thompson	Republican	1879	Incumbent retired. Republican hold.	▌ ✓ James Wilson (Republican) 47.5%; ▌ Benjamin T. Frederick (Democratic) 47.4%; ▌ David Platner (Greenback) 5.1%
Iowa 5	William George Thompson	Republican	1879	Election successfully contested. New member seated March 4, 1885. Democratic gain.	▌ ✓ Benjamin T. Frederick (Democratic) 47.5%; ▌ James Wilson (Republican) 47.4%; ▌ David Platner (Greenback) 5.1%
Iowa 6	John C. Cook	Democratic	1880	Incumbent lost renomination. Republican gain.	▌ ✓ Marsena E. Cutts (Republican) 40.4%; ▌ James B. Weaver (Greenback) 30.8%; ▌ C. H. Mackey (Democratic) 28.9%
Iowa 7	John A. Kasson	Republican	1880	Incumbent re-elected.	▌ ✓ John A. Kasson (Republican) 50.8%; ▌ T. C. Gilpin (Democratic) 26.3%; ▌ Edward H. Gillette (Greenback) 22.9%
Iowa 8	William P. Hepburn	Republican	1880	Incumbent re-elected.	▌ ✓ William P. Hepburn (Republican) 51.7%; ▌ D. M. Clark (Greenback) 27.5%; ▌ Lewis Bonnett (Democratic) 20.7%
Iowa 9	None (new district)			New seat. Democratic gain.	▌ ✓ William H. M. Pusey (Democratic) 49.0%; ▌ Albert R. Anderson (Republican) 41.4%; ▌ J. B. Hatton (Greenback) 9.5%
Iowa 10	Cyrus C. Carpenter; Redistricted from the 9th district	Republican	1878	Incumbent retired. Republican hold.	▌ ✓ Adoniram J. Holmes (Republican) 62.2%; ▌ John Cliggitt (Democratic) 29.9%; ▌ Josial Doane (Greenback) 7.9%
Iowa 11	None (new district)			New seat. Republican gain.	▌ ✓ Isaac S. Struble (Republican) 58.0%; ▌ John P. Allison (Democratic) 37.3%; ▌ J. R. Sovereign (Greenback) 4.7%

== Kansas ==
District	Incumbent			This race	
District	Member	Party	First elected	Results	Candidates
Kansas 1	John A. Anderson	Republican	1878	Incumbent re-elected.	▌ ✓ John A. Anderson (Republican) 68.3%; ▌Charles H. Moody (Greenback) 29.5%; ▌L. T. Smith (Democratic) 2.2%
Kansas 2	Dudley C. Haskell	Republican	1876	Incumbent re-elected.	▌ ✓ Dudley C. Haskell (Republican) 48.7%; ▌Nelson F. Acers (Democratic) 39.5%; ▌Alfred Taylor (Greenback) 11.8%
Kansas 3	Thomas Ryan	Republican	1876	Incumbent re-elected.	▌ ✓ Thomas Ryan (Republican) 57.1%; ▌John C. Cannon (Democratic) 28.1%; ▌D. J. Cole (Greenback) 14.8%
Kansas at-large 4 seats on a general ticket	None (new seat)			New seat. Republican gain.	▌ ✓ Samuel R. Peters (Republican) 14.9%; ▌ ✓ Edmund N. Morrill (Republican) 14.7%; ▌ ✓ Bishop W. Perkins (Republican) 14.6%; ▌ ✓ Lewis Hanback (Republican) 14.5%; ▌Samuel N. Wood (Democratic) 12.4%; ▌John O'Flanagan (Democratic) 8.9%; ▌Cyrus A. Leland (Democratic) 8.6%; ▌John Davis (Greenback) 4.0%; ▌H. L. Phillips (Democratic) 3.8%; ▌Allen Williams (Greenback) 3.3%
Kansas at-large 4 seats on a general ticket	None (new seat)			New seat. Republican gain.	▌ ✓ Samuel R. Peters (Republican) 14.9%; ▌ ✓ Edmund N. Morrill (Republican) 14.7%; ▌ ✓ Bishop W. Perkins (Republican) 14.6%; ▌ ✓ Lewis Hanback (Republican) 14.5%; ▌Samuel N. Wood (Democratic) 12.4%; ▌John O'Flanagan (Democratic) 8.9%; ▌Cyrus A. Leland (Democratic) 8.6%; ▌John Davis (Greenback) 4.0%; ▌H. L. Phillips (Democratic) 3.8%; ▌Allen Williams (Greenback) 3.3%
Kansas at-large 4 seats on a general ticket	None (new seat)			New seat. Republican gain.	▌ ✓ Samuel R. Peters (Republican) 14.9%; ▌ ✓ Edmund N. Morrill (Republican) 14.7%; ▌ ✓ Bishop W. Perkins (Republican) 14.6%; ▌ ✓ Lewis Hanback (Republican) 14.5%; ▌Samuel N. Wood (Democratic) 12.4%; ▌John O'Flanagan (Democratic) 8.9%; ▌Cyrus A. Leland (Democratic) 8.6%; ▌John Davis (Greenback) 4.0%; ▌H. L. Phillips (Democratic) 3.8%; ▌Allen Williams (Greenback) 3.3%
Kansas at-large 4 seats on a general ticket	None (new seat)			New seat. Republican gain.	▌ ✓ Samuel R. Peters (Republican) 14.9%; ▌ ✓ Edmund N. Morrill (Republican) 14.7%; ▌ ✓ Bishop W. Perkins (Republican) 14.6%; ▌ ✓ Lewis Hanback (Republican) 14.5%; ▌Samuel N. Wood (Democratic) 12.4%; ▌John O'Flanagan (Democratic) 8.9%; ▌Cyrus A. Leland (Democratic) 8.6%; ▌John Davis (Greenback) 4.0%; ▌H. L. Phillips (Democratic) 3.8%; ▌Allen Williams (Greenback) 3.3%

== Kentucky ==
District	Incumbent			This race	
District	Member	Party	First elected	Results	Candidates
Kentucky 1	Oscar Turner	Democratic	1878	Incumbent re-elected as an Independent Democratic candidate. Independent Democratic gain.	▌ ✓ Oscar Turner (Independent Democratic) 39.3%; ▌ John R. Grace (Democratic) 34.5%; ▌ Henry H. Houston (Republican) 26.2%
Kentucky 2	James A. McKenzie	Democratic	1876	Incumbent lost renomination. Democratic hold.	▌ ✓ James F. Clay (Democratic) 70.7%; ▌ W. M. Fuqua (Republican/Greenback) 24.3%; ▌ R. S. Eastin (Prohibition) 4.9%
Kentucky 3	John W. Caldwell	Democratic	1876	Incumbent retired. Democratic hold.	▌ ✓ John E. Halsell (Democratic) 50.4%; ▌ W. Godfrey Hunter (Republican) 49.7%
Kentucky 4	J. Proctor Knott	Democratic	1874	Incumbent retired. Democratic hold.	▌ ✓ Thomas A. Robertson (Democratic) 74.8%; ▌ W. H. Parrish (Republican) 25.1%
Kentucky 5	Albert S. Willis	Democratic	1876	Incumbent re-elected.	▌ ✓ Albert S. Willis (Democratic) 62.5%; ▌ Silas F. Miller (Republican) 34.3%; ▌ [FNU] Hunter (Prohibition) 3.2%
Kentucky 6	John G. Carlisle	Democratic	1876	Incumbent re-elected.	▌ ✓ John G. Carlisle (Democratic) 98.2%
Kentucky 7	J. C. S. Blackburn	Democratic	1874	Incumbent re-elected.	▌ ✓ J. C. S. Blackburn (Democratic) 63.8%; ▌ John W. Asbury (Republican) 36.2%
Kentucky 8	Philip B. Thompson Jr.	Democratic	1878	Incumbent re-elected.	▌ ✓ Philip B. Thompson Jr. (Democratic) 52.0%; ▌ R. L. Ewell (Republican) 48.0%
Kentucky 9	Elijah Phister; Redistricted from the 10th district	Democratic	1878	Incumbent retired. Republican gain.	▌ ✓ William Wirt Culbertson (Republican) 53.0%; ▌ Z. Smith Hurt (Democratic) 47.0%
Kentucky 10	John D. White; Redistricted from the 9th district	Republican	1880	Incumbent re-elected.	▌ ✓ John D. White (Republican) 52.5%; ▌ G. M. Adams (Democratic) 47.5%
Kentucky 11	None (new district)			New seat. Democratic gain.	▌ ✓ Frank Lane Wolford (Democratic) 54.7%; ▌ D. R. Carr (Republican) 45.3%

== Louisiana ==
District	Incumbent			This race	
District	Member	Party	First elected	Results	Candidates
Louisiana 1	Randall L. Gibson	Democratic	1874	Incumbent retired to run for U.S. senator. Democratic hold.	▌ ✓ Carleton Hunt (Democratic) 63.7%; ▌ Albert C. Janin (Republican/Greenback) 36.3%
Louisiana 2	E. John Ellis	Democratic	1874	Incumbent re-elected.	▌ ✓ E. John Ellis (Democratic) 58.4%; ▌ Morris Marks (Independent Republican) 21.1%; ▌ Henry Demas (Republican) 20.2%
Louisiana 3	Chester Bidwell Darrall	Republican	1880	Incumbent lost renomination. Republican hold.	▌ ✓ William Pitt Kellogg (Republican) 45.7%; ▌ Joseph H. Acklen (Democratic) 34.1%; ▌ Taylor Beattie (Independent Republican) 20.2%
Louisiana 4	Newton C. Blanchard	Democratic	1880	Incumbent re-elected.	▌ ✓ Newton C. Blanchard (Democratic) 99.8%
Louisiana 5	J. Floyd King	Democratic	1878	Incumbent re-elected.	▌ ✓ J. Floyd King (Democratic) 76.9%; ▌ William L. McMillen (Republican) 23.1%
Louisiana 6	Edward White Robertson	Democratic	1876	Incumbent lost renomination. Democratic hold.	▌ ✓ Andrew S. Herron (Democratic) 66.9%; ▌ Louis Trager (Republican) 33.1%

== Maine ==
District	Incumbent			This race	
District	Member	Party	First elected	Results	Candidates
Maine at-large 4 seats on a general ticket	Thomas B. Reed; Redistricted from the 1st district	Republican	1876	Incumbent re-elected.	▌ ✓ Thomas B. Reed (Republican) 13.3%; ▌ ✓ Nelson Dingley Jr. (Republican) 13.2%; ▌ ✓ Charles A. Boutelle (Republican) 13.2%; ▌ ✓ Seth L. Milliken (Republican) 13.2%; ▌Daniel H. Thing (Fusion) 11.5%; ▌Joseph Dane (Fusion) 11.5%; ▌George W. Ladd (Fusion) 11.5%; ▌Thompson H. Murch (Fusion) 11.4%
Maine at-large 4 seats on a general ticket	Nelson Dingley Jr. Redistricted from the 2nd district	Republican	1881 (special)	Incumbent re-elected.	▌ ✓ Thomas B. Reed (Republican) 13.3%; ▌ ✓ Nelson Dingley Jr. (Republican) 13.2%; ▌ ✓ Charles A. Boutelle (Republican) 13.2%; ▌ ✓ Seth L. Milliken (Republican) 13.2%; ▌Daniel H. Thing (Fusion) 11.5%; ▌Joseph Dane (Fusion) 11.5%; ▌George W. Ladd (Fusion) 11.5%; ▌Thompson H. Murch (Fusion) 11.4%
Maine at-large 4 seats on a general ticket	Stephen Lindsey; Redistricted from the 3rd district	Republican	1876	Incumbent retired. Republican hold.	▌ ✓ Thomas B. Reed (Republican) 13.3%; ▌ ✓ Nelson Dingley Jr. (Republican) 13.2%; ▌ ✓ Charles A. Boutelle (Republican) 13.2%; ▌ ✓ Seth L. Milliken (Republican) 13.2%; ▌Daniel H. Thing (Fusion) 11.5%; ▌Joseph Dane (Fusion) 11.5%; ▌George W. Ladd (Fusion) 11.5%; ▌Thompson H. Murch (Fusion) 11.4%
Maine at-large 4 seats on a general ticket	George W. Ladd; Redistricted from the 4th district	Greenback	1878	Incumbent lost re-election. Republican gain.	▌ ✓ Thomas B. Reed (Republican) 13.3%; ▌ ✓ Nelson Dingley Jr. (Republican) 13.2%; ▌ ✓ Charles A. Boutelle (Republican) 13.2%; ▌ ✓ Seth L. Milliken (Republican) 13.2%; ▌Daniel H. Thing (Fusion) 11.5%; ▌Joseph Dane (Fusion) 11.5%; ▌George W. Ladd (Fusion) 11.5%; ▌Thompson H. Murch (Fusion) 11.4%
Maine at-large 4 seats on a general ticket	Thompson H. Murch; Redistricted from the 5th district	Greenback	1878	Incumbent lost re-election. Greenback loss.	▌ ✓ Thomas B. Reed (Republican) 13.3%; ▌ ✓ Nelson Dingley Jr. (Republican) 13.2%; ▌ ✓ Charles A. Boutelle (Republican) 13.2%; ▌ ✓ Seth L. Milliken (Republican) 13.2%; ▌Daniel H. Thing (Fusion) 11.5%; ▌Joseph Dane (Fusion) 11.5%; ▌George W. Ladd (Fusion) 11.5%; ▌Thompson H. Murch (Fusion) 11.4%

== Maryland ==
District	Incumbent			This race	
District	Member	Party	First elected	Results	Candidates
Maryland 1	George W. Covington	Democratic	1880	Incumbent re-elected.	▌ ✓ George W. Covington (Democratic) 52.8%; ▌James C. Millikin (Republican) 47.2%
Maryland 2	J. Frederick C. Talbott	Democratic	1878	Incumbent re-elected.	▌ ✓ J. Frederick C. Talbott (Democratic) 52.2%; ▌Thaddeus Blair (Republican) 47.8%
Maryland 3	Fetter S. Hoblitzell	Democratic	1880	Incumbent re-elected.	▌ ✓ Fetter S. Hoblitzell (Democratic) 56.7%; ▌Thomas F. Lang (Republican) 36.8%; ▌William Kimmel (Ind. Democratic) 6.4%; ▌P. Finnegan (Unknown) 0.1%
Maryland 4	Robert M. McLane	Democratic	1847; 1851 (retired); 1878	Incumbent did not stand for re-election. Democratic hold.	▌ ✓ John Van Lear Findlay (Democratic) 53.1%; ▌Henry Stockbridge Jr. (Republican) 47.0%
Maryland 5	Andrew G. Chapman	Democratic	1880	Incumbent lost re-election. Republican gain.	▌ ✓ Hart Benton Holton (Republican) 53.0%; ▌Andrew G. Chapman (Democratic) 47.0%
Maryland 6	Milton Urner	Republican	1878	Incumbent retired. Republican hold.	▌ ✓ Louis E. McComas (Republican) 51.7%; ▌Montgomery Blair (Democratic) 47.5%; ▌A. F. George (Greenback) 0.9%

== Massachusetts ==
District	Incumbent			This race	
District	Member	Party	First elected	Results	Candidates
Massachusetts 1	William W. Crapo	Republican	1874	Incumbent retired. Republican hold.	▌ ✓ Robert T. Davis (Republican) 65.98%; ▌Nicholas Hathaway (Democratic) 32.09%; ▌George F. Babbitt (Greenback) 1.32%
Massachusetts 2	Benjamin W. Harris	Republican	1872	Incumbent retired. Republican hold.	▌ ✓ John Davis Long (Republican) 53.94%; ▌Edgar E. Dean (Democratic) 42.40%; Others: ▌John W. Willett (Prohibition) 2.28%; ▌George E. Dunham (Greenback) 1.39%
Massachusetts 3	Ambrose Ranney	Republican	1880	Incumbent re-elected.	▌ ✓ Ambrose Ranney (Republican) 58.02%; ▌Horatio E. Swasey (Democratic) 41.40%; Others: ▌Samuel B. Capen (Prohibition) 0.44%; ▌Nicholas Furlong (Greenback) 0.14%
Massachusetts 4	None (new district)			New seat. Democratic gain.	▌ ✓ Patrick A. Collins (Democratic) 73.48%; ▌Francis B. Hayes (Republican) 25.41%; Others: ▌Wendell Phillips (Prohibition) 0.70%; ▌Thomas C. Brophy (Greenback) 0.40%
Massachusetts 5	Leopold Morse; Redistricted from the 4th district	Democratic	1876	Incumbent re-elected.	▌ ✓ Leopold Morse (Democratic) 56.01%; ▌Selwyn Z. Bowman (Republican) 43.58%; ▌Amos Cummings (Prohibition) 0.41%
Massachusetts 5	Selwyn Z. Bowman	Republican	1878	Incumbent lost re-election. Republican loss.	▌ ✓ Leopold Morse (Democratic) 56.01%; ▌Selwyn Z. Bowman (Republican) 43.58%; ▌Amos Cummings (Prohibition) 0.41%
Massachusetts 6	None (new district)			New seat. Democratic gain.	▌ ✓ Henry B. Lovering (Democratic) 51.77%; ▌ Elisha S. Converse (Republican) 48.23%
Massachusetts 7	Eben F. Stone; Redistricted from the 6th district	Republican	1880	Incumbent re-elected.	▌ ✓ Eben F. Stone (Republican) 44.31%; ▌Charles Perkins Thompson (Democratic) 38.62%; ▌Eben Moody Boynton (Greenback) 16.85%; ▌J. Newton Emery (Prohibition) 0.22%
Massachusetts 8	William A. Russell; Redistricted from the 7th district	Republican	1878	Incumbent re-elected.	▌ ✓ William A. Russell (Republican) 51.00%; ▌Charles S. Lilley (Democratic) 48.62%; ▌Charles F. Cox (Greenback) 0.38%
Massachusetts 9	John W. Candler; Redistricted from the 8th district	Republican	1880	Incumbent lost re-election. Independent Republican gain.	▌ ✓ Theodore Lyman III (Ind. Republican) 54.44%; ▌John W. Candler (Republican) 43.74%; Others: ▌George W. Stacey (Prohibition) 0.93%; ▌Prescott West (Greenback) 0.88%
Massachusetts 10	William W. Rice; Redistricted from the 9th district	Republican	1876	Incumbent re-elected.	▌ ✓ William W. Rice (Republican) 55.50%; ▌John Hopkins (Democratic) 44.06%; ▌Jason Waters (Greenback) 0.45%
Massachusetts 11	Amasa Norcross; Redistricted from the 10th district	Republican	1876	Incumbent retired. Republican hold.	▌ ✓ William Whiting II (Republican) 64.22%; ▌Edward J. Sawyer (Democratic) 33.70%; Others: ▌Warren Johnson (Greenback) 1.34%; ▌Oscar Edwards (Prohibition) 0.75%
Massachusetts 12	George D. Robinson; Redistricted from the 11th district	Republican	1876	Incumbent re-elected.	▌ ✓ George D. Robinson (Republican) 53.32%; ▌Reuben Noble (Democratic) 46.68%

== Michigan ==
District	Incumbent			This race	
District	Member	Party	First elected	Results	Candidates
Michigan 1	Henry W. Lord	Republican	1880	Incumbent lost re-election. Democratic gain.	▌ ✓ William C. Maybury (Democratic/Greenback) 57.4%; ▌ Henry W. Lord (Republican) 39.8%; ▌ W. G. Brownlee (FreeTrade) 2.8%
Michigan 2	Edwin Willits	Republican	1876	Incumbent retired. Democratic gain.	▌ ✓ Nathaniel B. Eldredge (Democratic) 48.2%; ▌ John K. Boies (Republican) 46.5%; ▌ A. J. Baker (Greenback) 4.1%
Michigan 3	Edward S. Lacey	Republican	1880	Incumbent re-elected.	▌ ✓ Edward S. Lacey (Republican) 52.0%; ▌ Hiram C. Hodge (Democratic/Greenback) 47.1%
Michigan 4	Julius C. Burrows	Republican	1878	Incumbent lost re-election. Democratic gain.	▌ ✓ George L. Yaple (Democratic/Greenback) 50.4%; ▌ Julius C. Burrows (Republican) 49.6%
Michigan 5	George W. Webber	Republican	1880	Incumbent retired. Democratic gain.	▌ ✓ Julius Houseman (Democratic/Greenback) 49.5%; ▌ William O. Webster (Republican) 49.3%
Michigan 6	Oliver L. Spaulding	Republican	1880	Incumbent lost re-election. Democratic gain.	▌ ✓ Edwin B. Winans (Democratic/Greenback) 49.8%; ▌ Oliver L. Spaulding (Republican) 49.8%
Michigan 7	John T. Rich	Republican	1881	Incumbent lost re-election. Democratic gain.	▌ ✓ Ezra C. Carleton (Democratic/Greenback) 50.6%; ▌ John T. Rich (Republican) 49.4%
Michigan 8	Roswell G. Horr	Republican	1878	Incumbent re-elected.	▌ ✓ Roswell G. Horr (Republican) 50.7%; ▌ Charles J. Willett (Democratic/Greenback) 47.5%
Michigan 9	None (new seat)			New Seat. Republican gain.	▌ ✓ Byron M. Cutcheon (Republican) 55.4%; ▌ Stephen Brunson (Democratic/Greenback) 44.6%
Michigan 10	None (new seat)			New Seat. Republican gain.	▌ ✓ Herschel H. Hatch (Republican) 52.6%; ▌ Andrew C. Maxwell (Democratic/Greenback) 36.0%; ▌ Jesse M. Miller (National) 11.3%
Michigan 11	Jay Hubbell; Redistricted from the 9th district	Republican	1872	Incumbent retired. Republican hold.	▌ ✓ Edward Breitung (Republican) 68.5%; ▌ Peter White (Democratic/Greenback) 29.0%

== Minnesota ==
District	Incumbent			This race	
District	Member	Party	First elected	Results	Candidates
Minnesota 1	Mark H. Dunnell	Republican	1870	Incumbent retired to run for U.S. Senator. Republican hold.	▌ ✓ Milo White (Republican) 49.1%; ▌Adolph Biermann (Democratic) 46.4%; ▌Charles H. Roberts (Greenback) 4.5%
Minnesota 2	None (new district)			New seat. Republican gain.	▌ ✓ James Wakefield (Republican) 63.6%; ▌Felix A. Bohrer (Democratic) 25.0%; ▌Jacob A. Latimer (Greenback) 11.4%
Minnesota 3	Horace B. Strait; Redistricted from the 2nd district	Republican	1880	Incumbent re-elected.	▌ ✓ Horace B. Strait (Republican) 68.1%; ▌Charles P. Adams (Democratic) 28.9%; ▌Porter Martin (Greenback) 2.9%
Minnesota 4	William D. Washburn; Redistricted from the 3rd district	Republican	1878	Incumbent re-elected.	▌ ✓ William D. Washburn (Republican) 51.5%; ▌A. A. Ames (Democratic) 43.9%; ▌Edwin Phillips (Prohibition) 4.6%
Minnesota 5	None (new district)			New seat. Republican gain.	▌ ✓ Knute Nelson (Republican) 47.8%; ▌Charles F. Kindred (Ind. Republican) 34.5%; ▌Edward P. Barnum (Democratic) 17.6%

== Mississippi ==
District	Incumbent			This race	
District	Member	Party	First elected	Results	Candidates
Mississippi 1	Henry L. Muldrow	Democratic	1876	Incumbent re-elected.	▌ ✓ Henry L. Muldrow (Democratic) 81.88%; ▌Theodore C. Lyon (Republican) 18.12%
Mississippi 2	Van. H. Manning	Democratic	1876	Incumbent re-elected.	▌ ✓ Van. H. Manning (Democratic) 47.02%; ▌James R. Chalmers (Independent) 44.38%; ▌J. R. Chambless (Independent) 7.91%; ▌H. C. Carter (Republican) 0.69%
Mississippi 2	Van. H. Manning	Democratic	1876	Election successfully contested in 1884. Results corrected. Independent gain.	▌ ✓ James R. Chalmers (Independent) 52.29%; ▌Van. H. Manning (Democratic) 47.02%; ▌H. C. Carter (Republican) 0.69%
Mississippi 3	None (new district)			New seat. Republican gain.	▌ ✓ Elza Jeffords (Republican) 69.14%; ▌Charles W. Clarke (Democratic) 22.13%; ▌V. B. Waddell (Ind. Democratic) 8.73%
Mississippi 4	Hernando Money; Redistricted from the 3rd district.	Democratic	1874	Incumbent re-elected.	▌ ✓ Hernando Money (Democratic) 68.75%; ▌John T. Griffin (Republican) 26.54%; ▌S. M. Roane (Greenback) 4.71%
Mississippi 5	Charles E. Hooker	Democratic	1874	Incumbent retired. Democratic loss.	▌ ✓ Otho R. Singleton (Democratic) 99.08%; ▌Henry C. Niles (Republican) 0.92%
Mississippi 5	Otho R. Singleton; Redistricted from the 4th district.	Democratic	1874	Incumbent re-elected.	▌ ✓ Otho R. Singleton (Democratic) 99.08%; ▌Henry C. Niles (Republican) 0.92%
Mississippi 6	John R. Lynch	Republican	1880 (Note: Original victor was James R. Chalmers, but election was overturned by Congress.)	Incumbent lost re-election. Democratic gain.	▌ ✓ Henry S. Van Eaton (Democratic) 53.17%; ▌John R. Lynch (Republican) 46.83%
Mississippi 7	None (new district)			New seat. Democratic gain.	▌ ✓ Ethelbert Barksdale (Democratic) 66.70%; ▌James Hill (Republican) 33.30%

== Missouri ==
Missouri gained one seat in reapportionment. After redistricting and the new elections, the delegation went from 7 Democrats, 4 Greenbacks, and 2 Republicans, to a solid slate of 14 Democrats.

District	Incumbent			This race	
District	Member	Party	First elected	Results	Candidates
Missouri 1	William H. Hatch; Redistricted from the 12th district	Democratic	1878	Incumbent re-elected.	▌ ✓ William H. Hatch (Democratic) 57.35%; ▌John Montgomery Glover (Ind. Democratic) 40.30%; ▌Leavitt (Note: Full name unknown) (Republican) 2.36%
Missouri 2	New district			New seat. Democratic gain.	▌ ✓ Armstead M. Alexander (Democratic); ▌S. B. Dorsey (Republican) 26.18%; ▌William Quayle (Greenback) 16.09%
Missouri 3	Joseph H. Burrows; Redistricted from the 10th district	Greenback	1880	Incumbent lost re-election. Democratic gain.	▌ ✓ Alexander M. Dockery (Democratic) 52.89%; ▌James H. Thomas (Republican) 39.49%; ▌Joseph H. Burrows (Greenback) 7.61%
Missouri 4	Nicholas Ford; Redistricted from the 9th district	Greenback	1878	Incumbent declined renomination. Democratic gain.	▌ ✓ James N. Burnes (Democratic) 51.09%; ▌Morris A. Reed (Republican) 40.53%; ▌Nathaniel Sisson (Greenback) 8.38%
Missouri 5	Theron M. Rice; Redistricted from the 7th district	Greenback	1880	Incumbent retired. Democratic gain.	▌ ✓ Alexander Graves (Democratic) 58.75%; ▌John T. Crisp (Democratic) 40.13%; ▌McCabe (Greenback) 1.12%
Missouri 5	Robert T. Van Horn; Redistricted from the 8th district	Republican	1864; 1870 (retired); 1880	Incumbent retired. Republican loss.	▌ ✓ Alexander Graves (Democratic) 58.75%; ▌John T. Crisp (Democratic) 40.13%; ▌McCabe (Greenback) 1.12%
Missouri 6	New district			New seat. Democratic gain.	▌ ✓ John Cosgrove (Democratic) 60.18%; ▌William C. Alldridge (Greenback) 39.82%
Missouri 7	Aylett H. Buckner; Redistricted from the 13th district	Democratic	1872	Incumbent re-elected.	▌ ✓ Aylett H. Buckner (Democratic) 55.24%; ▌Charles Daudt (Republican) 37.89%; ▌T. J. McNair (Greenback) 6.87%
Missouri 8	Gustavus Sessinghaus; Redistricted from the 3rd district	Republican	1882 (contested)	Incumbent lost re-election. Democratic gain.	▌ ✓ John J. O'Neill (Democratic) 48.03%; ▌Gustavus Sessinghaus (Ind. Republican) 36.52%; ▌Thomas J. Dailey (Republican) 8.56%; ▌Frank Sullivan (Greenback) 6.89%
Missouri 9	Thomas Allen; Redistricted from the 2nd district	Democratic	1880	Incumbent died April 8, 1882. Democratic hold. Winner was not elected to finish the current term in the old district.	▌ ✓ James Broadhead (Democratic) 50.38%; ▌James H. McLean (Republican) 49.63%
Missouri 10	Martin L. Clardy; Redistricted from the 1st district	Democratic	1878	Incumbent re-elected.	▌ ✓ Martin L. Clardy (Democratic) 57.22%; ▌Henry Manistre (Republican) 31.51%; ▌George M. Jackson (Greenback) 11.27%
Missouri 11	Richard P. Bland; Redistricted from the 5th district	Democratic	1872	Incumbent re-elected.	▌ ✓ Richard P. Bland (Democratic) 54.89%; ▌William G. Wallace (Republican) 40.54%; ▌John H. Quinn (Greenback) 4.57%
Missouri 11	John Bullock Clark Jr.	Democratic	1872	Incumbent lost renomination. Democratic loss.	▌ ✓ Richard P. Bland (Democratic) 54.89%; ▌William G. Wallace (Republican) 40.54%; ▌John H. Quinn (Greenback) 4.57%
Missouri 12	New district			New seat. Democratic gain.	▌ ✓ Charles H. Morgan (Democratic) 53.94%; ▌William J. Terrell (Republican) 33.10%; ▌Gage S. Spring (Greenback) 12.97%
Missouri 13	Ira S. Hazeltine; Redistricted from the 6th district	Greenback	1880	Incumbent lost re-election. Democratic gain.	▌ ✓ Robert W. Fyan (Democratic) 42.85%; ▌William T. Cloud (Republican) 38.29%; ▌Ira Sherwin Hazeltine (Greenback) 18.87%
Missouri 14	Lowndes H. Davis; Redistricted from the 4th district	Democratic	1878	Incumbent re-elected.	▌ ✓ Lowndes H. Davis (Democratic) 58.14%; ▌A. B. Carroll (Republican) 29.76%; ▌Sol G. Kitchen (Greenback) 12.11%

== Nebraska ==
District	Incumbent			This race	
District	Member	Party	First elected	Results	Candidates
Nebraska 1	None (New seat)			New seat. Republican gain.	▌ ✓ Archibald J. Weaver (Republican) 50.9%; ▌John I. Reddick (Democratic) 38.0%; ▌W. S. Gilbert (Anti-Monopoly) 11.1%
Nebraska 2	None (New seat)			New seat. Republican gain.	▌ ✓ James Laird (Republican) 49.8%; ▌V. S. Moore (Anti-Monopoly) 38.4%; ▌F. A. Harman (Democratic) 11.8%
Nebraska 3	Edward K. Valentine; Redistricted from the at-large district	Republican	1878	Incumbent re-elected.	▌ ✓ Edward K. Valentine (Republican) 39.5%; ▌William Henry Munger (Democratic) 34.8%; ▌M. K. Turner (Anti-Monopoly) 4.8%

== Nevada ==
District	Incumbent			This race	
District	Member	Party	First elected	Results	Candidates
Nevada at-large	George W. Cassidy	Democratic	1880	Incumbent re-elected.	▌ ✓ George W. Cassidy (Democratic) 54.4%; ▌C. C. Powning (Republican) 45.6%

== New Hampshire ==
District	Incumbent			This race	
District	Member	Party	First elected	Results	Candidates
New Hampshire 1	Joshua G. Hall	Republican	1878	Incumbent retired. Republican hold.	▌ ✓ Martin A. Haynes (Republican) 54.9%; ▌George B. Chandler (Democratic) 44.3%
New Hampshire 2	James F. Briggs	Republican	1877	Incumbent retired. Republican loss.	▌ ✓ Ossian Ray (Republican) 52.2%; ▌Jewett D. Hosley (Democratic) 46.8%
New Hampshire 2	Ossian Ray; Redistricted from the 3rd district	Republican	1880 (special)	Incumbent re-elected.	▌ ✓ Ossian Ray (Republican) 52.2%; ▌Jewett D. Hosley (Democratic) 46.8%

== New Jersey ==
District	Incumbent			This race	
District	Member	Party	First elected	Results	Candidates
New Jersey 1	George M. Robeson	Republican	1878	Incumbent lost re-election. Democratic gain.	▌ ✓ Thomas M. Ferrell (Democratic) 50.1%; ▌ George M. Robeson (Republican) 44.9%; ▌ [FNU] Bustor (Greenback) 2.1%
New Jersey 2	J. Hart Brewer	Republican	1880	Incumbent re-elected.	▌ ✓ J. Hart Brewer (Republican) 51.3%; ▌ Lewis Parker (Democratic) 47.8%; ▌ Edward T. Howland (Greenback) 0.9%
New Jersey 3	Miles Ross	Democratic	1874	Incumbent lost re-election. Republican gain.	▌ ✓ John Kean (Republican) 48.2%; ▌ Miles Ross (Democratic) 40.9%; ▌ [FNU] Urner (Greenback) 11.0%
New Jersey 4	Henry S. Harris	Democratic	1880	Incumbent lost re-election. Republican gain.	▌ ✓ Benjamin Franklin Howey (Republican) 49.2%; ▌ Henry S. Harris (Democratic) 47.1%
New Jersey 5	John Hill	Republican	1880	Incumbent retired. Republican hold.	▌ ✓ William Walter Phelps (Republican) 50.4%; ▌ John Ryle (Democratic) 44.6%
New Jersey 6	Phineas Jones	Republican	1880	Incumbent retired. Democratic gain.	▌ ✓ William H. F. Fiedler (Democratic) 53.2%; ▌ John L. Blake (Republican) 45.7%; ▌ William Hook (Greenback) 1.1%
New Jersey 7	Augustus A. Hardenbergh	Democratic	1880	Incumbent retired. Democratic hold.	▌ ✓ William McAdoo (Democratic) 56.6%; ▌ Gilbert Collins (Republican) 43.2%

== New York ==
District	Incumbent			This race	
District	Member	Party	First elected	Results	Candidates
New York 1	Perry Belmont	Democratic	1880	Incumbent re-elected.	▌ ✓ Perry Belmont (Democratic) 77.6%; ▌ Dwight Townsend (Ind. Democratic) 20.2%; ▌ Harvey Markham (Greenback) 2.2%
New York 2	William Erigena Robinson	Democratic	1880	Incumbent re-elected,	▌ ✓ William Erigena Robinson (Democratic) 63.1%; ▌ David A. Boody (Ind. Democratic/Republican) 35.8%; ▌ John V. Brown (Greenback) 1.1%
New York 3	J. Hyatt Smith	Independent	1880	Incumbent retired. Republican gain.	▌ ✓ Darwin R. James (Republican) 52.5%; ▌ William Hester (Democratic) 46.0%; ▌ Robert Gilles (Greenback) 1.5%
New York 4	Archibald M. Bliss	Democratic	1874	Incumbent retired. Democratic hold.	▌ ✓ Felix Campbell (Democratic) 61.5%; ▌ Charles W. Goddard (Republican) 36.1%; ▌ Walter F. Blaisdell (Greenback) 2.4%
New York 5	Benjamin Wood	Democratic	1880	Incumbent retired. Democratic hold.	▌ ✓ Nicholas Muller (Democratic) 86.7%; ▌ John F. Berrigan (Republican) 8.9%; ▌ James E. Quinn (Greenback) 4.1%
New York 6	Samuel S. Cox	Democratic	1873	Incumbent re-elected.	▌ ✓ Samuel S. Cox (Democratic) 74.6%; ▌ Daniel Quinn (Republican) 23.8%; ▌ George D. Lennon (Liberal) 1.6%
New York 7	P. Henry Dugro	Democratic	1880	Incumbent retired. Democratic hold.	▌ ✓ William Dorsheimer (Democratic) 57.7%; ▌ John E. Brodsky (Republican) 34.4%; ▌ William McCabe (Liberal) 7.9%
New York 8	Anson G. McCook	Republican	1876	Incumbent lost renomination. Democratic gain.	▌ ✓ John J. Adams (Democratic) 51.3%; ▌ John W. Russell (Republican) 46.3%; ▌ Louis F. Post (Liberal) 2.4%
New York 9	John Hardy	Democratic	1881	Incumbent re-elected.	▌ ✓ John Hardy (Democratic) 69.2%; ▌ James Rowan O'Beirne (Republican) 30.8%
New York 10	Abram Hewitt	Democratic	1880	Incumbent re-elected.	▌ ✓ Abram Hewitt (Democratic) 90.7%; ▌ Casper Van Heoesen (Independent) 9.3%
New York 11	Roswell P. Flower	Democratic	1881	Incumbent retired. Democratic hold.	▌ ✓ Orlando B. Potter (Democratic) 51.9%; ▌ William Lafayette Strong (Republican) 48.1%
New York 12	Waldo Hutchins	Democratic	1879	Incumbent re-elected.	▌ ✓ Waldo Hutchins (Democratic) 63.7%; ▌ Edward B. Long (Republican) 36.3%
New York 13	John H. Ketcham	Republican	1876	Incumbent re-elected.	▌ ✓ John H. Ketcham (Republican) 90.1%; ▌ Sylvester Tripp (Greenback) 5.1%; ▌ Jonathan Dorland (Prohibition) 4.8%
New York 14	Lewis Beach	Democratic	1880	Incumbent re-elected.	▌ ✓ Lewis Beach (Democratic) 49.8%; ▌ Henry R. Low (Republican) 47.5%; ▌ George W. Pimm (Greenback) 1.6%; ▌ Isaac Carey (Prohibition) 1.1%
New York 15	Thomas Cornell	Republican	1880	Incumbent retired. Democratic gain.	▌ ✓ John H. Bagley Jr. (Democratic) 55.7%; ▌ Charles Bray (Republican) 44.1%; ▌ Heirant Brown (Greenback) 0.2%
New York 16	Michael N. Nolan	Democratic	1880	Incumbent retired. Democratic hold.	▌ ✓ Thomas J. Van Alstyne (Democratic) 57.0%; ▌ Theodore V. Van Hoesen (Republican) 36.5%; ▌ Lemon Thompson (Greenback) 6.4%
New York 17	Walter A. Wood	Republican	1878	Incumbent retired. Republican hold.	▌ ✓ Henry G. Burleigh (Republican) 100%
New York 18	John Hammond	Republican	1878	Incumbent retired. Republican hold.	▌ ✓ Frederick A. Johnson (Republican) 87.8%; ▌ Thomas Fassett (Democratic) 12.2%
New York 19	Abraham X. Parker	Republican	1880	Incumbent re-elected.	▌ ✓ Abraham X. Parker (Republican) 63.1%; ▌ James R. Smith (Democratic) 36.9%
New York 20	George West	Republican	1880	Incumbent lost re-election. Democratic gain.	▌ ✓ Edward Wemple (Democratic) 50.0%; ▌ George West (Republican) 49.8%; ▌ Nathaniel E. Close (Greenback) 0.2%
New York 21	Ferris Jacobs Jr.	Republican	1880	Incumbent retired. Republican hold.	▌ ✓ George W. Ray (Republican) 48.0%; ▌ Linn Babcock (Democratic) 46.6%; ▌ Ira T. Walker (Prohibition) 2.9%; ▌ H. Delos Mallory (Greenback) 2.5%
New York 22	Charles R. Skinner	Republican	1881	Incumbent re-elected.	▌ ✓ Charles R. Skinner (Republican) 52.2%; ▌ Leonard G. Davenport (Democratic) 47.8%
New York 23	Cyrus D. Prescott	Republican	1878	Incumbent retired. Democratic gain.	▌ ✓ John T. Spriggs (Democratic) 51.9%; ▌ Samuel H. Fox (Republican) 44.8%; ▌ Henry N. Porter (Prohibition) 2.0%; ▌ William Harris (Greenback) 1.3%
New York 24	Joseph Mason	Republican	1878	Incumbent retired. Republican hold.	▌ ✓ Newton W. Nutting (Republican) 52.0%; ▌ Charles Rhodes (Democratic) 44.8%; ▌ Orzo M. Bond (Prohibition) 1.9%; ▌ J. Eugene Sperry (Greenback) 1.3%
New York 25	Frank Hiscock	Republican	1876	Incumbent re-elected.	▌ ✓ Frank Hiscock (Republican) 48.7%; ▌ Alexander H. Davis (Democratic) 46.2%; ▌ William A. Sweet (Greenback) 3.9%; ▌ Ehhraiur N. Abbott (Prohibition) 1.2%
New York 26	John H. Camp	Republican	1876	Incumbent retired. Republican hold.	▌ ✓ Sereno E. Payne (Republican) 48.8%; ▌ Jasper N. Hammond (Democratic) 45.3%; ▌ Isaac M. Foster (Prohibition) 3.1%; ▌ Milton F. Merchant (Greenback) 2.8%
New York 27	James W. Wadsworth	Republican	1881	Incumbent re-elected.	▌ ✓ James W. Wadsworth (Republican) 52.3%; ▌ David A. Pierpont (Democratic) 47.6%; ▌ Albert Heath (Greenback) 0.1%
New York 28	Jeremiah W. Dwight	Republican	1876	Incumbent retired. Republican hold.	▌ ✓ Stephen C. Millard (Republican) 51.8%; ▌ Frederick Davis (Democratic) 45.9%; ▌ Martin D. Hall (Greenback) 2.3%
New York 29	David P. Richardson	Republican	1878	Incumbent retired. Democratic gain.	▌ ✓ John Arnot Jr. (Democratic) 50.0%; ▌ Archie E. Baxter (Republican) 42.1%; ▌ James Baldwin (Prohibition) 5.9%; ▌ Sewill Shattuck (Greenback) 2.0%
New York 30	John Van Voorhis	Republican	1878	Incumbent lost re-election. Democratic gain.	▌ ✓ Halbert S. Greenleaf (Democratic) 56.2%; ▌ John Van Voorhis (Republican) 38.4%; ▌ James Gordon (Greenback) 5.4%
New York 31	Richard Crowley	Republican	1878	Incumbent retired. Democratic gain.	▌ ✓ Robert S. Stevens (Democratic) 53.6%; ▌ William C. Watson (Republican) 41.8%; ▌ Joseph W. Grosvenor (Prohibition) 4.6%
New York 32	Jonathan Scoville	Democratic	1880	Incumbent retired. Democratic hold.	▌ ✓ William Findlay Rogers (Democratic) 49.5%; ▌ Emisson Moulton (Republican) 47.7%; ▌ Emmor Haines (Greenback) 1.9%; ▌ Joseph Southwick (Prohibition) 0.9%
New York 33	Henry Van Aernam	Republican	1878	Incumbent retired. Republican hold.	▌ ✓ Francis B. Brewer (Republican) 51.4%; ▌ Alexander M. Lowry (Democratic) 40.7%; ▌ Walter A. Sellers (Prohibition) 4.2%; ▌ John H. Randall (Greenback) 3.7%
New York at-large	None (new district)			New seat. Democratic gain.	▌ ✓ Henry Warner Slocum (Democratic) 55.1%; ▌ Howard Carroll (Republican) 42.9%; ▌ Lirries S. Freeman (Prohibition) 1.3%; ▌ Laionard McDonald (Greenback) 0.7%

== North Carolina ==
The Liberal Anti-Prohibition Party was formed following the failure of the first statewide referendum on Prohibition in 1881. Throughout most of North Carolina, the moribund Republican Party merged into the new party and scored impressive gains in the 1882 elections. By early 1884, however, the LAP was dissolving, and they are listed here synonymously with the Republican Party.

District	Incumbent			This race	
District	Member	Party	First elected	Results	Candidates
North Carolina 1	Louis C. Latham	Democratic	1880	Incumbent lost re-election. Republican gain.	▌ ✓ Walter F. Pool (Republican) (Note: As "Liberal Anti-Prohibition") 51.22%; ▌Louis C. Latham (Democratic) 48.77%; ▌Cicero Green (Greenback) 0.01%
North Carolina 2	Orlando Hubbs	Republican	1880	Incumbent retired. Republican hold.	▌ ✓ James E. O'Hara (Republican) 93.80%; ▌John Hughes (Democratic) 2.04%; Scattering 2.25%
North Carolina 3	John W. Shackelford	Democratic	1880	Incumbent died January 18, 1883. Democratic hold.	▌ ✓ Wharton J. Green (Democratic) 50.87%; ▌William P. Canaday (Republican) 49.10%
North Carolina 4	William Ruffin Cox	Democratic	1880	Incumbent re-elected.	▌ ✓ William Ruffin Cox (Democratic) 50.63%; ▌Thomas P. Devereaux (Republican) 49.37%
North Carolina 5	Alfred M. Scales	Democratic	1874	Incumbent re-elected.	▌ ✓ Alfred M. Scales (Democratic) 52.74%; ▌John R. Winston (Republican) 46.41%
North Carolina 6	Clement Dowd	Democratic	1880	Incumbent re-elected.	▌ ✓ Clement Dowd (Democratic) 57.16%; ▌William Johnston (Republican) 42.84%
North Carolina 7	Robert F. Armfield	Democratic	1878	Incumbent lost renomination. Republican gain.	▌ ✓ Tyre York (Republican) 48.61%; ▌William M. Robbins (Democratic) 47.46%; ▌Columbus L. Cook (Greenback) 3.93%
North Carolina 8	Robert B. Vance	Democratic	1872	Incumbent re-elected.	▌ ✓ Robert B. Vance (Democratic) 56.40%; ▌William M. Cocke Jr. (Republican) 43.55%
North Carolina at-large	None (new seat)			New seat. Democratic gain.	▌ ✓ Risden T. Bennett (Democratic) 50.05%; ▌Oliver H. Dockery (Republican) 49.85%

== Ohio ==
District	Incumbent			This race	
District	Member	Party	First elected	Results	Candidates
Ohio 1	Benjamin Butterworth	Republican	1878	Incumbent lost re-election. Democratic gain.	▌ ✓ John F. Follett (Democratic) 51.4%; ▌ Benjamin Butterworth (Republican) 48.5%
Ohio 2	Thomas L. Young	Republican	1878	Incumbent lost renomination. Democratic gain.	▌ ✓ Isaac M. Jordan (Democratic) 53.0%; ▌ Amor Smith (Republican) 47.0%
Ohio 3	Emanuel Shultz; Redistricted from the 4th district	Republican	1880	Incumbent lost re-election. Democratic gain.	▌ ✓ Robert Maynard Murray (Democratic) 49.6%; ▌ Emanuel Shultz (Republican) 48.8%; ▌ William McKee (Prohibition) 1.4%; ▌ Benjamin F. Miller (Greenback) 0.2%
Ohio 4	Benjamin Le Fevre; Redistricted from the 5th district	Democratic	1878	Incumbent re-elected.	▌ ✓ Benjamin Le Fevre (Democratic) 62.7%; ▌ Jacob S. Conklin (Republican) 36.6%; ▌ William Dillon (Greenback) 0.7%
Ohio 5	None (new district)			New seat. Democratic gain.	▌ ✓ George E. Seney (Democratic) 59.0%; ▌ Lovell B. Harris (Republican) 39.1%; ▌ Martin Deal (Prohibition) 1.0%; ▌ John Seitz (Greenback) 0.9%
Ohio 6	None (new district)			New seat. Democratic gain.	▌ ✓ William D. Hill (Democratic) 49.7%; ▌ Joseph H. Brigham (Republican) 47.5%; ▌ George Loutzenheiser (Greenback) 1.6%; ▌ E. T. Hayes (Prohibition) 1.3%
Ohio 7	Henry Lee Morey; Redistricted from the 3rd district	Republican	1880	Incumbent re-elected.	▌ ✓ Henry Lee Morey (Republican) 49.7%; ▌ James E. Campbell (Democratic) 49.6%; ▌ Samuel K. Mitchell (Prohibition) 0.5%; ▌ C. C. Parker (Greenback) 0.2%
Ohio 7	Henry Lee Morey; Redistricted from the 3rd district	Republican	1880	Election successfully contested. New member seated June 20, 1884. Democratic gain.	▌ ✓ James E. Campbell (Democratic) 49.7%; ▌ Henry Lee Morey (Republican) 49.7%; ▌ Samuel K. Mitchell (Prohibition) 0.5%; ▌ C. C. Parker (Greenback) 0.2%
Ohio 8	J. Warren Keifer	Republican	1876	Incumbent re-elected.	▌ ✓ J. Warren Keifer (Republican) 50.2%; ▌ J. H. Young (Democratic) 45.9%; ▌ [FNU] Smith (Prohibition) 3.5%; ▌ A. S. Piatt (Greenback) 0.4%
Ohio 9	James S. Robinson	Republican	1880	Incumbent re-elected.	▌ ✓ James S. Robinson (Republican) 48.8%; ▌ Thomas E. Powell (Democratic) 47.5%; ▌ William Bonar (Prohibition) 3.7%
Ohio 10	John B. Rice	Republican	1880	Incumbent retired. Democratic gain.	▌ ✓ Frank H. Hurd (Democratic) 51.2%; ▌ Charles A. King (Republican) 47.3%; ▌ J. H. Rhoads (Greenback) 0.8%; ▌ J. W. Lance (Prohibition) 0.6%
Ohio 10	James M. Ritchie; Redistricted from the 6th district	Republican	1880	Incumbent retired. Republican loss.	▌ ✓ Frank H. Hurd (Democratic) 51.2%; ▌ Charles A. King (Republican) 47.3%; ▌ J. H. Rhoads (Greenback) 0.8%; ▌ J. W. Lance (Prohibition) 0.6%
Ohio 11	Henry S. Neal	Republican	1876	Incumbent retired. Republican hold.	▌ ✓ John W. McCormick (Republican) 53.3%; ▌ John P. Leedom (Democratic) 45.6%; ▌ Alva Crabtree (Prohibition) 0.6%; ▌ David Bennett (Greenback) 0.4%
Ohio 11	John P. Leedom; Redistricted from the 7th district	Democratic	1880	Incumbent lost re-election. Democratic loss	▌ ✓ John W. McCormick (Republican) 53.3%; ▌ John P. Leedom (Democratic) 45.6%; ▌ Alva Crabtree (Prohibition) 0.6%; ▌ David Bennett (Greenback) 0.4%
Ohio 12	None (new district)			New seat. Republican gain.	▌ ✓ Alphonso Hart (Republican) 48.9%; ▌ Lawrence T. Neal (Democratic) 48.9%; ▌ Daniel Hill (Prohibition) 2.2%
Ohio 13	George L. Converse; Redistricted from the 12th district	Democratic	1878	Incumbent re-elected.	▌ ✓ George L. Converse (Democratic) 54.2%; ▌ H. C. Drinkle (Republican) 43.0%; ▌ Thomas P. James (Greenback) 1.8%; ▌ Zeno C. Payne (Prohibition) 1.0%
Ohio 14	George W. Geddes	Democratic	1878	Incumbent re-elected.	▌ ✓ George W. Geddes (Democratic) 51.2%; ▌ Rollin A. Horr (Republican) 45.2%; ▌ John W. Bell (Prohibition) 3.6%
Ohio 15	Rufus Dawes	Republican	1880	Incumbent lost re-election. Democratic gain.	▌ ✓ Adoniram J. Warner (Democratic) 50.4%; ▌ Rufus Dawes (Republican) 47.9%; ▌ William Reese (Greenback) 1.3%; ▌ Smith Branson (Prohibition) 0.4%
Ohio 16	Gibson Atherton; Redistricted from the 13th district	Democratic	1878	Incumbent retired. Democratic hold.	▌ ✓ Beriah Wilkins (Democratic) 57.3%; ▌ Appleton B. Clark (Republican) 41.9%; ▌ Joseph Judkins (Greenback) 0.8%
Ohio 17	Jonathan T. Updegraff; Redistricted from the 16th district	Republican	1878	Incumbent re-elected.	▌ ✓ Jonathan T. Updegraff (Republican) 50.4%; ▌ Ross J. Alexander (Democratic) 47.2%; ▌ Thomas S. Luccock (Prohibition) 1.3%; ▌ N. C. Horton (Greenback) 1.2%
Ohio 18	William McKinley; Redistricted from the 17th district	Republican	1876	Incumbent re-elected.	▌ ✓ William McKinley (Republican) 48.2%; ▌ Jonathan H. Wallace (Democratic) 48.2%; ▌ Lemuel T. Foster (Greenback) 2.9%; ▌ J. K. Buskirk (Prohibition) 0.7%
Ohio 18	William McKinley; Redistricted from the 17th district	Republican	1876	Election successfully contested. New member seated May 27, 1884. Democratic gain.	▌ ✓ Jonathan H. Wallace (Democratic) 48.2%; ▌ William McKinley (Republican) 48.2%; ▌ Lemuel T. Foster (Greenback) 2.9%; ▌ J. K. Buskirk (Prohibition) 0.7%
Ohio 19	Ezra B. Taylor	Republican	1880	Incumbent re-elected.	▌ ✓ Ezra B. Taylor (Republican) 62.7%; ▌ David L. Rockwell (Democratic) 30.7%; ▌ [FNU] Smith (Prohibition) 4.4%; ▌ Reuben T. Harmon (Greenback) 2.2%
Ohio 20	Addison S. McClure; Redistricted from the 18th district	Republican	1880	Incumbent lost re-election. Democratic gain.	▌ ✓ David R. Paige (Democratic) 47.9%; ▌ Addison S. McClure (Republican) 47.6%; ▌ Jay Odell (Prohibition) 4.1%; ▌ [FNU] Smith (Greenback) 0.5%
Ohio 21	Amos Townsend; Redistricted from the 20th district	Republican	1876	Incumbent retired. Democratic gain.	▌ ✓ Martin A. Foran (Democratic) 54.3%; ▌ Sylvester T. Everett (Republican) 38.9%; ▌ William H. Doan (Prohibition) 6.8%

== Oregon ==
District	Incumbent			This race	
District	Member	Party	First elected	Results	Candidates
Oregon at-large	Melvin Clark George	Republican	1880	Incumbent re-elected.	▌ ✓ Melvin Clark George (Republican) 54.0%; ▌ William D. Fenton (Democratic) 46.0%

== Pennsylvania ==
District	Incumbent			This race	
District	Member	Party	First elected	Results	Candidates
Pennsylvania 1	Henry H. Bingham	Republican	1878	Incumbent re-elected.	▌ ✓ Henry H. Bingham (Republican) 55.7%; ▌ John Cadwalader (Democratic) 42.1%; ▌ Lucius H. Warren (Civil Service Reform) 2.3%
Pennsylvania 2	Charles O'Neill	Republican	1872	Incumbent re-elected.	▌ ✓ Charles O'Neill (Republican) 56.7%; ▌ W. Wurt Dundas (Democratic) 43.3%
Pennsylvania 3	Samuel J. Randall	Democratic	1862	Incumbent re-elected.	▌ ✓ Samuel J. Randall (Democratic) 61.6%; ▌ William M. Maull (Republican) 38.5%
Pennsylvania 4	William D. Kelley	Republican	1860	Incumbent re-elected.	▌ ✓ William D. Kelley (Republican) 61.3%; ▌ Charles M. Swaim (Democratic) 38.7%
Pennsylvania 5	Alfred C. Harmer	Republican	1876	Incumbent re-elected.	▌ ✓ Alfred C. Harmer (Republican) 53.2%; ▌ Thomas Martin (Democratic) 46.8%
Pennsylvania 6	William Ward	Republican	1876	Incumbent retired. Republican hold.	▌ ✓ James B. Everhart (Republican) 59.1%; ▌ J. Edward Clyde (Democratic) 39.7%; ▌ E. F. Pennypacker (Prohibition) 1.3%
Pennsylvania 7	William Godshalk	Republican	1878	Incumbent retired. Republican hold.	▌ ✓ Isaac Newton Evans (Republican) 51.0%; ▌ W. W. Davis (Democratic) 49.0%
Pennsylvania 8	Daniel Ermentrout	Democratic	1880	Incumbent re-elected.	▌ ✓ Daniel Ermentrout (Democratic) 64.2%; ▌ Isaac McHose (Republican) 34.8%; ▌ Joshua Wright (Greenback) 1.0%
Pennsylvania 9	A. Herr Smith	Republican	1872	Incumbent re-elected.	▌ ✓ A. Herr Smith (Republican) 62.8%; ▌ William B. Given (Democratic) 37.2%
Pennsylvania 10	William Mutchler	Democratic	1880	Incumbent re-elected.	▌ ✓ William Mutchler (Democratic) 63.1%; ▌ James S. Biery (Republican) 37.0%
Pennsylvania 11	Robert Klotz	Democratic	1878	Incumbent retired. Democratic hold.	▌ ✓ John B. Storm (Democratic) 64.5%; ▌ H. Cavalier Smith (Republican) 35.5%
Pennsylvania 12	Joseph A. Scranton	Republican	1880	Incumbent lost re-election. Democratic gain.	▌ ✓ Daniel W. Connolly (Democratic) 47.9%; ▌ Joseph A. Scranton (Republican) 43.1%; ▌ R. J. Flick (Greenback) 8.2%
Pennsylvania 13	Charles N. Brumm	Greenback	1880	Incumbent re-elected.	▌ ✓ Charles N. Brumm (Greenback/Republican) 51.5%; ▌ J. M. Wetherill (Democratic) 48.5%
Pennsylvania 14	Samuel Fleming Barr	Republican	1880	Incumbent re-elected.	▌ ✓ Samuel Fleming Barr (Republican) 46.3%; ▌ Henry McCormick (Democratic) 45.9%; ▌ John McCleery (Independent Republican) 6.1%; ▌ Simon Brownewell (Greenback) 1.7%
Pennsylvania 15	Cornelius C. Jadwin	Republican	1880	Incumbent lost renomination and lost re-election as an Independent Republican candidate. Democratic gain.	▌ ✓ George Adams Post (Democratic) 42.1%; ▌ Cornelius C. Jadwin (Independent Republican) 33.1%; ▌ Edward Overton Jr. (Republican) 20.7%; ▌ Richard T. Dodson (Prohibition) 2.1%; ▌ Mason Stark (Greenback) 2.0%
Pennsylvania 16	Robert J. C. Walker	Republican	1880	Incumbent declined renomination. Republican hold.	▌ ✓ William Wallace Brown (Republican) 48.8%; ▌ Henry W. Farley (Democratic) 44.5%; ▌ J. Stickel (Greenback) 6.7%
Pennsylvania 17	Jacob M. Campbell	Republican	1880	Incumbent re-elected.	▌ ✓ Jacob M. Campbell (Republican) 49.2%; ▌ Alexander H. Coffroth (Democratic) 47.4%; ▌ Henry Bunker (Greenback) 2.0%; ▌ H. C. McKinley (Independent Republican) 1.4%
Pennsylvania 18	Horatio G. Fisher	Republican	1878	Incumbent retired. Republican hold.	▌ ✓ Louis E. Atkinson (Republican) 50.6%; ▌ Francis M. Kimmell (Democratic) 48.1%; ▌ W. F. Snyder (Greenback) 1.3%
Pennsylvania 19	Frank E. Beltzhoover	Democratic	1878	Incumbent retired. Democratic hold.	▌ ✓ William Addison Duncan (Democratic) 54.8%; ▌ William McSherry (Independent Democratic) 44.4%; ▌ John Moore (Greenback) 0.8%
Pennsylvania 20	Andrew Gregg Curtin	Democratic	1880	Incumbent re-elected.	▌ ✓ Andrew Gregg Curtin (Democratic) 59.3%; ▌ Samuel H. Orwig (Republican) 40.5%; ▌ W. A. Stephens (Prohibition) 0.1%
Pennsylvania 21	Morgan R. Wise	Democratic	1878	Incumbent retired. Democratic hold.	▌ ✓ Charles Edmund Boyle (Democratic) 55.6%; ▌ Charles S. Seaton (Greenback/Republican) 44.1%; ▌ A. B. Miller (Prohibition) 0.4%
Pennsylvania 22	Russell Errett	Republican	1876	Incumbent lost re-election. Democratic gain.	▌ ✓ James Herron Hopkins (Democratic) 47.5%; ▌ Russell Errett (Republican) 42.8%; ▌ James Campbell (Greenback) 9.0%; ▌ T. P. Hershberger (Prohibition) 0.7%
Pennsylvania 23	Thomas M. Bayne	Republican	1876	Incumbent re-elected.	▌ ✓ Thomas M. Bayne (Republican) 83.7%; ▌ S. G. Barnes (Greenback) 13.4%; ▌ Joseph H. Robinson (Prohibition) 2.9%
Pennsylvania 24	William S. Shallenberger	Republican	1876	Incumbent retired. Republican hold.	▌ ✓ George V. Lawrence (Republican) 50.4%; ▌ John G. McConahy (Democratic) 47.0%; ▌ Robert Peebles (Prohibition) 1.4%; ▌ James A. Emerson (Greenback) 1.3%
Pennsylvania 25	James Mosgrove	Greenback	1880	Incumbent retired. Democratic gain.	▌ ✓ John Denniston Patton (Democratic/Greenback) 51.9%; ▌ Harry White (Republican) 48.2%
Pennsylvania 26	Samuel H. Miller	Republican	1880	Incumbent re-elected.	▌ ✓ Samuel H. Miller (Republican) 47.9%; ▌ James H. Caldwell (Democratic) 45.4%; ▌ Seth Hoagland (Greenback) 3.7%; ▌ E. Ogden (Prohibition) 2.9%
Pennsylvania 27	Lewis F. Watson	Republican	1880	Incumbent retired. Republican hold.	▌ ✓ Samuel Myron Brainerd (Republican) 45.8%; ▌ H. B. Plumer (Democratic) 42.0%; ▌ William T. Everson (Greenback/Prohibition) 12.3%
Pennsylvania at-large	None (new seat)			New seat. Democratic gain.	▌ ✓ Mortimer Fitzland Elliott (Democratic) 47.5%; ▌ Marriott Brosius (Republican) 43.5%; ▌ William McMichael (Independent Republican) 5.5%; ▌ R. R. Tomlinson (Greenback) 2.8%; ▌ Newton Peirce (Prohibition) 0.6%

== Rhode Island ==
District	Incumbent			This race	
District	Member	Party	First elected	Results	Candidates
Rhode Island 1	Henry J. Spooner	Republican	1881 (special)	Incumbent re-elected.	▌ ✓ Henry J. Spooner (Republican) 70.2%; ▌Oscar Lapham (Democratic) 29.8%
Rhode Island 2	Jonathan Chace	Republican	1880	Incumbent re-elected.	▌ ✓ Jonathan Chace (Republican) 64.6%; ▌Jonathan M. Wheeler (Democratic) 35.4%

== South Carolina ==
District	Incumbent			This race	
District	Member	Party	First elected	Results	Candidates
South Carolina 1	John S. Richardson	Democratic	1878	Incumbent retired. Democratic hold.	▌ ✓ Samuel Dibble (Democratic) 56.9%; ▌James B. Campbell (Greenback) 43.1%
South Carolina 2	George D. Tillman; Redistricted from the 5th district	Democratic	1878	Incumbent re-elected.	▌ ✓ George D. Tillman (Democratic) 67.8%; ▌E. M. Brayon (Republican) 31.9%; ▌W. H. Duncan (Ind. Democratic) 0.4%
South Carolina 3	D. Wyatt Aiken	Democratic	1876	Incumbent re-elected.	▌ ✓ D. Wyatt Aiken (Democratic) 84.6%; ▌T. H. Russell (Republican/Greenback) 15.4%
South Carolina 4	John H. Evins	Democratic	1876	Incumbent re-elected.	▌ ✓ John H. Evins (Democratic) 71.8%; ▌D. R. Elkins (Greenback) 27.2%
South Carolina 5	None (new district)			New seat. Democratic hold.	▌ ✓ John J. Hemphill (Democratic) 56.0%; ▌E. B. C. Cash (Ind. Greenback) 44.0%
South Carolina 6	None (new district)			New seat. Democratic gain.	▌ ✓ George W. Dargan (Democratic) 64.7%; ▌Edmund H. Deas (Republican) 21.7%; ▌A. H. Bowen (Greenback) 13.6%
South Carolina 7	Vacant (Michael P. O'Connor (D) died April 26, 1881)			Republican gain.	▌ ✓ Edmund W. M. Mackey (Republican) 64.8%; ▌Samuel Lee (Ind. Republican) 35.2%

== Tennessee ==
District	Incumbent			This race	
District	Member	Party	First elected	Results	Candidates
Tennessee 1	A. H. Pettibone	Republican	1880	Incumbent re-elected.	▌ ✓ A. H. Pettibone (Republican) 53.91%; ▌Robert L. Taylor (Democratic) 46.09%
Tennessee 2	Leonidas C. Houk	Republican	1878	Incumbent re-elected.	▌ ✓ Leonidas C. Houk (Republican) 62.23%; ▌William Rule (Ind. Republican) 37.77%
Tennessee 3	George G. Dibrell	Democratic	1874	Incumbent re-elected.	▌ ✓ George G. Dibrell (Democratic) 53.50%; ▌Daniel C. Trewhitt (Republican) 45.50%; ▌Samuel Parker (Greenback) 1.00%
Tennessee 4	Benton McMillin	Democratic	1878	Incumbent re-elected.	▌ ✓ Benton McMillin (Democratic) 77.88%; ▌William B. Stokes (Republican) 22.13%
Tennessee 5	Richard Warner	Democratic	1880	Incumbent re-elected.	▌ ✓ Richard Warner (Democratic) 54.38%; ▌James D. Tillman (Ind. Democratic) 39.40%; ▌B. F. Duggin (Republican) 23.70%
Tennessee 6	John F. House	Democratic	1874	Incumbent retired. Democratic hold.	▌ ✓ Andrew J. Caldwell (Democratic) 61.70%; ▌Joseph R. Dillon (Republican) 34.26%; ▌B. F. Brooks (Greenback) 3.70%; ▌A. P. McMillin (Unknown) 0.34%
Tennessee 7	Washington C. Whitthorne	Democratic	1870	Incumbent retired. Democratic hold.	▌ ✓ John G. Ballentine (Democratic) 62.96%; ▌Thomas F. Perkins (Republican) 37.04%
Tennessee 8	John D. C. Atkins	Democratic	1872	Incumbent retired. Democratic hold.	▌ ✓ John M. Taylor (Democratic) 51.81%; ▌Samuel W. Hawkins (Republican) 38.52%; ▌James T. Warren (Greenback) 6.97%; ▌Solomon C. Hearn (Greenback) 2.70%
Tennessee 9	Charles B. Simonton	Democratic	1878	Incumbent retired. Democratic hold.	▌ ✓ Rice A. Pierce (Democratic) 61.14%; ▌W. J. Lisle (Republican) 37.63%; ▌J. T. Shackleford (Ind. Greenback) 1.23%
Tennessee 10	William R. Moore	Republican	1880	Incumbent retired. Democratic gain.	▌ ✓ H. Casey Young (Democratic) 51.09%; ▌William M. Smith (Republican) 46.99%; ▌C. M. Lambeth (Independent) 1.92%

== Texas ==
District	Incumbent			This race	
District	Member	Party	First elected	Results	Candidates
Texas 1	None (new district)			New seat. Democratic gain.	▌ ✓ Charles Stewart (Democratic) 62.5%; ▌ William Chambers (Republican) 37.2%
Texas 2	John H. Reagan; Redistricted from the 1st district	Democratic	1874	Incumbent re-elected.	▌ ✓ John H. Reagan (Democratic) 100.0%
Texas 3	None (new district)			New seat. Democratic gain.	▌ ✓ James H. Jones (Democratic) 57.9%; ▌ Stillwell H. Russell (Republican) 39.1%; ▌ H. W. Wade (Independent) 2.9%
Texas 4	David B. Culberson; Redistricted from the 2nd district	Democratic	1874	Incumbent re-elected.	▌ ✓ David B. Culberson (Democratic) 63.4%; ▌ Ebenezer L. Dohoney (Greenback) 36.6%
Texas 5	None (new district)			New seat. Democratic gain.	▌ ✓ James W. Throckmorton (Democratic) 72.0%; ▌ J. N. Dixon (Greenback) 28.0%
Texas 6	Olin Wellborn; Redistricted from the 3rd district	Democratic	1878	Incumbent re-elected.	▌ ✓ Olin Wellborn (Democratic) 71.6%; ▌ Jerome C. Kearby (Greenback) 28.4%
Texas 7	None (new district)			New seat. Independent gain.	▌ ✓ Thomas P. Ochiltree (Independent) 55.8%; ▌ George P. Finlay (Democratic) 44.1%
Texas 8	None (new district)			New seat. Democratic gain.	▌ ✓ James Francis Miller (Democratic) 59.0%; ▌ Robert Zapp (Greenback/Republican) 31.3%; ▌ Joseph O'Connor (Independent) 8.5%
Texas 9	Roger Q. Mills; Redistricted from the 4th district	Democratic	1872	Incumbent re-elected.	▌ ✓ Roger Q. Mills (Democratic) 63.9%; ▌ J. D. Rankin (Greenback) 36.1%
Texas 10	Christopher C. Upson; Redistricted from the 6th district	Democratic	1879	Incumbent lost renomination. Democratic hold.	▌ ✓ John Hancock (Democratic) 62.2%; ▌ Edmund J. Davis (Republican) 37.8%
Texas 10	George Washington Jones; Redistricted from the 5th district	Greenback	1878	Incumbent retired to run for Governor of Texas. Greenback loss.	▌ ✓ John Hancock (Democratic) 62.2%; ▌ Edmund J. Davis (Republican) 37.8%
Texas 11	None (new district)			New seat. Democratic gain.	▌ ✓ S. W. T. Lanham (Democratic) 51.0%; ▌ Joseph W. Barnett (Greenback) 23.1%; ▌ Jewett H. Davenport (Ind. Democratic) 18.5%; ▌ S. C. Buck (Ind. Democratic) 7.4%

== Vermont ==
District	Incumbent			This race	
District	Member	Party	First elected	Results	Candidates
Vermont 1	Charles H. Joyce	Republican	1874	Incumbent retired. Republican hold.	▌ ✓ John W. Stewart (Republican) 69.3%; ▌Lyman W. Redington (Democratic) 26.6%; ▌C. W. Kidder (Greenback) 3.8%
Vermont 2	James M. Tyler	Republican	1878	Incumbent retired. Republican hold.	▌ ✓ Luke P. Poland (Republican) 52.0%; ▌George L. Fletcher (Democratic) 25.9%; ▌William W. Grout (Independent) 18.6%; ▌H. D. Dunbar (Greenback) 1.6%
Vermont 2	William W. Grout; Redistricted from the 3rd district	Republican	1880	Incumbent lost renomination. Republican loss.	▌ ✓ Luke P. Poland (Republican) 52.0%; ▌George L. Fletcher (Democratic) 25.9%; ▌William W. Grout (Independent) 18.6%; ▌H. D. Dunbar (Greenback) 1.6%

== Virginia ==
District	Incumbent			This race	
District	Member	Party	First elected	Results	Candidates
Virginia 1	George T. Garrison	Democratic	1880	Incumbent lost re-election. Readjuster gain.	▌ ✓ Robert M. Mayo (Readjuster) 49.6%; ▌George T. Garrison (Democratic) 49.6%; ▌John Woetz (Republican) 0.8%
Virginia 2	John F. Dezendorf	Republican	1880	Incumbent lost re-election. Readjuster gain.	▌ ✓ Harry Libbey (Readjuster) 49.7%; ▌Richard C. Marsrhall (Democratic) 38.6%; ▌John F. Dezendorf (Republican) 11.7%
Virginia 3	George D. Wise	Democratic	1880	Incumbent re-elected.	▌ ✓ George D. Wise (Democratic) 57.1%; ▌J. Ambler Smith (Readjuster) 42.9%
Virginia 4	Joseph Jorgensen	Republican	1876	Incumbent retired. Readjuster gain.	▌ ✓ Benjamin S. Hooper (Readjuster) 75.5%; ▌William A. Reese (Democratic) 23.3%; ▌Tazwell Branch (Republican) 1.3%
Virginia 5	George Cabell	Democratic	1874	Incumbent re-elected.	▌ ✓ George Cabell (Democratic) 53.0%; ▌William E. Sims (Readjuster) 47.0%
Virginia 6	J. Randolph Tucker	Democratic	1874	Incumbent re-elected.	▌ ✓ J. Randolph Tucker (Democratic) 55.0%; ▌J. Henry Rives (Readjuster) 44.6%; ▌David J. Woodfin (Republican) 0.4%
Virginia 7	John Paul	Readjuster	1872	Incumbent re-elected.	▌ ✓ John Paul (Readjuster) 50.2%; ▌Charles T. O'Ferrall (Democratic) 49.4%; ▌James Cochran (Republican) 0.4%
Virginia 8	John S. Barbour Jr.	Democratic	1880	Incumbent re-elected.	▌ ✓ John S. Barbour Jr. (Democratic) 60.4%; ▌Richard R. Farr (Readjuster) 38.3%; ▌John B. Syphax (Republican) 1.4%
Virginia 9	Abram Fulkerson	Readjuster	1878	Incumbent lost re-election as a Democrat. Readjuster hold.	▌ ✓ Henry Bowen (Readjuster) 57.7%; ▌Abram Fulkerson (Democratic) 32.1%; ▌Samuel H. Newberry (Independent) 8.4%; ▌H. H. Dotson (Republican) 1.9%
Virginia at-large	None (new seat)			New seat. Readjuster gain.	▌ ✓ John Sergeant Wise (Readjuster) 50.4%; ▌John E. Massey (Democratic) 47.4%; ▌John Dawson (Republican) 2.2%

== West Virginia ==
District	Incumbent			This race	
District	Member	Party	First elected	Results	Candidates
West Virginia 1	Benjamin Wilson	Democratic	1874	Incumbent retired. Republican gain.	▌ ✓ Nathan Goff Jr. (Republican) 52.24%; ▌John H. Good (Democratic) 45.53%; ▌Luther Shinn (Greenback) 2.24%
West Virginia 2	John B. Hoge	Democratic	1880	Incumbent retired. Democratic hold.	▌ ✓ William L. Wilson (Democratic) 48.62%; ▌John W. Mason (Republican) 48.57%; ▌Bethuel Kitchen (Greenback) 2.81%
West Virginia 3	John E. Kenna	Democratic	1876	Incumbent re-elected.	▌ ✓ John E. Kenna (Democratic) 47.86%; ▌George Loomis (Republican) 42.33%; ▌A. R. Barber (Greenback) 9.82%
West Virginia 4	None (new district)			New seat. Democratic gain.	▌ ✓ Eustace Gibson (Democratic) 47.86%; ▌George Loomis (Republican) 42.33%; ▌A. R. Barber (Greenback) 9.82%

== Wisconsin ==
Wisconsin elected nine members of congress on Election Day, November 7, 1882. One seat was newly added in reapportionment after the 1880 census.

District	Incumbent			This race	
District	Member	Party	First elected	Results	Candidates
Wisconsin 1	Charles G. Williams	Republican	1872	Incumbent lost re-election. Democratic gain.	▌ ✓ John Winans (Democratic) 46.7%; ▌Charles G. Williams (Republican) 44.9%; ▌C. M. Blackman (Prohibition) 8.4%; ▌William L. Utley (Greenback) 0.0%
Wisconsin 1	Lucien B. Caswell; Redistricted from the 2nd district	Republican	1874	Incumbent lost renomination. Republican loss.	▌ ✓ John Winans (Democratic) 46.7%; ▌Charles G. Williams (Republican) 44.9%; ▌C. M. Blackman (Prohibition) 8.4%; ▌William L. Utley (Greenback) 0.0%
Wisconsin 2	Edward S. Bragg; Redistricted from the 5th district	Democratic	1876	Incumbent lost renomination. Democratic hold.	▌ ✓ Daniel H. Sumner (Democratic) 50.4%; ▌John Samuel Rowell (Republican) 41.9%; ▌Eugene W. Chafin (Prohibition) 4.8%; ▌Lorenzo Merrill (Greenback) 3.0%
Wisconsin 3	George C. Hazelton	Republican	1876	Incumbent lost re-election. Democratic gain.	▌ ✓ Burr W. Jones (Democratic) 46.0%; ▌George C. Hazelton (Republican) 28.0%; ▌Elisha W. Keyes (Ind. Republican) 13.4%; ▌Samuel D. Hastings (Prohibition) 11.1%; ▌Peter W. Matts (Greenback) 1.6%
Wisconsin 4	Peter V. Deuster	Democratic	1878	Incumbent re-elected.	▌ ✓ Peter V. Deuster (Democratic) 48.6%; ▌Frederick C. Winkler (Republican) 41.7%; ▌George B. Goodwin (Labor) 9.6%
Wisconsin 5	None (new district)			New seat. Democratic gain.	▌ ✓ Joseph Rankin (Democratic) 62.7%; ▌Levi Howland (Republican) 29.6%; ▌R. L. Wing (Prohibition) 3.9%; ▌John E. Thomas (Greenback) 3.7%
Wisconsin 6	Richard W. Guenther	Republican	1880	Incumbent re-elected.	▌ ✓ Richard W. Guenther (Republican) 44.1%; ▌Andrew Haben (Democratic) 39.7%; ▌Theodore D. Kanouse (Prohibition) 2.1%; ▌L. A. Stewart (Greenback) 2.1%
Wisconsin 7	None (new district)			New seat. Democratic gain.	▌ ✓ Gilbert M. Woodward (Democratic) 48.1%; ▌Cyrus M. Butt (Republican) 42.8%; ▌B. F. Parker (Prohibition) 7.6%; ▌Reuben May (Greenback) 1.5%
Wisconsin 8	Thaddeus C. Pound	Republican	1876	Incumbent retired. Republican hold.	▌ ✓ William T. Price (Republican) 55.4%; ▌William F. Bailey (Democratic) 44.6%
Wisconsin 8	Herman L. Humphrey; Redistricted from the 7th district	Republican	1876	Incumbent lost renomination. Republican loss.	▌ ✓ William T. Price (Republican) 55.4%; ▌William F. Bailey (Democratic) 44.6%
Wisconsin 9	None (new district)			New seat. Republican gain.	▌ ✓ Isaac Stephenson (Republican) 47.4%; ▌Gilbert L. Park (Democratic) 46.4%; ▌H. H. Woodmansee (Prohibition) 5.4%; ▌John Mehan (Greenback) 0.7%

== Non-voting delegates ==
District	Incumbent			This race	
District	Delegate	Party	First elected	Results	Candidates
Arizona Territory at-large	G. H. Oury	Democratic	1880	Incumbent re-elected.	▌ ✓ G. H. Oury (Democratic); Uncontested
Dakota Territory at-large	Richard F. Pettigrew	Republican	1880	Incumbent lost re-election. Republican hold.	▌ ✓ John B. Raymond (Republican); [data missing]
Idaho Territory at-large	George Ainslie	Democratic	1878	Incumbent lost re-election. Republican gain.	▌ ✓ Theodore F. Singiser (Republican) 63.18%; ▌George Ainslie (Democratic) 36.71%
Montana Territory at-large	Martin Maginnis	Democratic	1872	Incumbent re-elected.	▌ ✓ Martin Maginnis (Democratic) 54.35%; ▌Alexander C. Botkin (Republican) 45.65%
New Mexico Territory at-large	Tranquilino Luna	Republican	1880	Incumbent re-elected.	▌ ✓ Tranquilino Luna (Republican) 52.96%; ▌Francisco A. Manzanares (Democratic) 47.04%
Utah Territory at-large	George Q. Cannon	Republican	1872	Incumbent disqualified on account of polygamy. Democratic gain. Winner also elected to finish the current term; see above.	▌ ✓ John T. Caine (Democratic) 100%; Uncontested
Washington Territory at-large	Thomas H. Brents	Republican	1878	Incumbent re-elected.	▌ ✓ Thomas H. Brents (Republican) 57.71%; ▌Thomas Burke 42.29%
Wyoming Territory at-large	Morton E. Post	Democratic	1880	Incumbent re-elected.	▌ ✓ Morton E. Post (Democratic) 55.28%; ▌J. W. Meldrum (Republican) 44.72%

== See also ==
- 1882 United States elections
  - 1882–83 United States Senate elections
- 47th United States Congress
- 48th United States Congress

== Bibliography ==
- Republican Congressional Committee, The Republican Campaign Text Book for 1882 (1882).
- Dubin, Michael J. (March 1, 1998). United States Congressional Elections, 1788-1997: The Official Results of the Elections of the 1st Through 105th Congresses. McFarland and Company. ISBN 978-0786402830.
- Martis, Kenneth C. (January 1, 1989). The Historical Atlas of Political Parties in the United States Congress, 1789-1989. Macmillan Publishing Company. ISBN 978-0029201701.
- Moore, John L., ed. (1994). Congressional Quarterly's Guide to U.S. Elections (Third ed.). Congressional Quarterly Inc. ISBN 978-0871879967.
- "Party Divisions of the House of Representatives* 1789–Present". Office of the Historian, House of United States House of Representatives.
