= Sylvester Artley =

American politician (1848–1917)

Sylvester Artley (1848–1917) was an American politician. A member of the Socialist Labor Party of America, he served in the Illinois Senate during the 31st and 32nd General Assemblies.

== Biography ==
Artley was born on November 30, 1848, in Williamsport, Pennsylvania. He was a craftsman and picture frame maker. In the 1878 general election, he was elected to the Illinois Senate from the 3rd district and joined in the Illinois General Assembly by three fellow socialists elected to the Illinois House; Leo Meilbeck, Charles Ehrardt, and Christian Meier. Artley defeated Henry F. Sheridan and James Gilmore with 3,775 votes to Sheridan's 3,387 votes and Gilmore's 789 votes. The 3rd district consisted of Chicago's 6th, 7th, and 8th wards. Sheridan challenged Artley's election and demanded a recount, but Artley was seated. In the 31st General Assembly he served on the following committees; Expenses of the General Assembly; Corporations; Banks and Banking, Penal and Reformatory Institutions; Education and Educational Institutions; Labor and Manufactures; Printing; and Military Affairs. In the 1882 United States House of Representatives election, Artley was the Socialist nominee in Illinois's 2nd congressional district. He finished fourth of four candidates with Democratic candidate John F. Finerty winning the election to succeed George R. Davis. He was succeeded as Senator from the 3rd district by Republican John H. Clough.

After his time in the legislature, he moved to San Diego, California, and died in 1917.
