= Emanuel Shultz =

American politician (1819–1912)

Member of the U.S. House of Representatives from Ohio's 4th district
- In office March 4, 1881 – March 3, 1883
- Preceded by: J. Warren Keifer
- Succeeded by: Benjamin Le Fevre

Member of the Ohio House of Representatives from the Montgomery County district
- In office January 3, 1876 – January 6, 1878 Serving with Thomas F. Thresher, George A. Grove
- Preceded by: Christian A. Coler, James F. Thompson
- Succeeded by: Daniel Crossley, H. H. Hendricks, John O'Conner

Personal details
- Born: July 25, 1819 Berks County, Pennsylvania, U.S.
- Died: November 5, 1912 (aged 93) Miamisburg, Ohio, U.S.
- Resting place: Hill Grove Cemetery
- Party: Republican
- Spouse: Sarah Beck

Emanuel Shultz (July 25, 1819 – November 5, 1912) was a shoemaker, merchant, manufacturer, banker and a member of the United States House of Representatives from Ohio for a single term from 1881 to 1883

== Early life and career ==
Emanuel Shultz was born in Berks County, Pennsylvania, the son of George and Mary (Vinyard) Shultz. He attended the public schools until he was eleven years old when his father died. He was compelled to leave school and depend on diligent self-study and was soon apprenticed to the trade of shoemaking. In 1838, he moved to Miamisburg, Ohio, where he engaged five to fifteen journeymen to make boots and shoes.

Shultz married Sarah Beck, of Miamisburg, on July 23, 1840. They had three daughters. Shultz was initiated a charter member of the Marion Lodge the Masons in 1844, a royal arch Mason and a Knight Templar. He was also a member of the Odd Fellows and Knights of Pythias.

== Banking career ==
Around 1846, he became a trader in general produce, and became one of the largest and most successful commercial operators in the Miami Valley. One success built upon another and he soon was a leader in all the prominent enterprises of Miamisburg. Shultz was also a leading tobacco leaf dealer since 1853, Montgomery and Butler counties being major tobacco producing and manufacturing centers in Ohio and the United States throughout the last half of the 19th century. In 1865, he was one of the founders of the private bank of H. Groby & Co., and a principal in the Miami Valley Paper Company, which he organized in 1871.

== Political career ==
Shultz began his political affiliation with the Whigs, but since the formation of the Republican party was a steadfast Republican. He served in most of the local minor offices and then in 1859 as Montgomery County Commissioner until 1862.

In 1873, he was a delegate to the Ohio Constitutional Convention that revised the Ohio Constitution. The citizens, however, declined to adopt it in the subsequent referendum. In 1875, Shultz was elected to the Ohio House of Representatives, serving one term but was not a candidate for re-election.

=== Congress ===
In 1878, he ran in Ohio's 3rd congressional district against Democrat John A. McMahon, but was defeated. In 1880 after redistricting, Shultz again faced McMahon, but was narrowly elected to the Forty-seventh United States Congress from Ohio's 4th congressional district.

In 1882, he was redistricted back into the third district and was narrowly defeated by Democrat Robert Maynard Murray.

== Later career ==
Shultz returned to Miamisburg and again engaged in paper manufacturing. In 1881, he was one of the organizers and stockholders of the Lima Car Works, which built railroad freight cars and was later a part of Lima Locomotive Works, and also served as vice president of the company until he sold his interest about 1889. He was appointed postmaster of Miamisburg by President Benjamin Harrison in 1889, serving about five years.

== Death ==
Shultz died at the age of 93 in Miamisburg; he was interred in Hill Grove Cemetery.

U.S. House of Representatives
Preceded by J. Warren Keifer	Member of the U.S. House of Representatives from Ohio's 4th congressional district 1881–1883	Succeeded by Benjamin Le Fevre
