= 149th Illinois Infantry Regiment =

149th Regiment Illinois Volunteer Infantry
- Illinois state flag
- Active: February 11, 1865, to January 27, 1866
- Country: United States
- Allegiance: Union
- Branch: Infantry

The 149th Regiment Illinois Volunteer Infantry was an infantry regiment that served in the Union Army during the American Civil War.

== Service ==
The 149th Illinois Infantry was organized at Camp Butler, Illinois, and mustered into Federal service on February 11, 1865, for a one-year enlistment.

On February 14th, it Moved to Nashville, Tennessee, and from there, Moved to Chattanooga. and Was Assigned to Colonel Felix Prince Salm's Second Brigade, Second Separate Division, Army of the Cumberland, The regiment moved to Dalton, Georgia, On July 6th, Moved to Atlanta. On the 26th, Being Assigned to Duty in the Fourth-Sub District of Allatoona. It was Assigned to Guard Duty in the District.

The regiment was mustered out of service on January 27, 1866.

== Total strength and casualties ==
The regiment suffered 31 enlisted men who died of disease for a total of 31 fatalities.

== Commanders ==
- Colonel William C. Kueffner - mustered out with the regiment.

== See also ==
- List of Illinois Civil War Units
- Illinois in the American Civil War
