= 1881 United States House of Representatives elections =

- April 5, 1881 – November 22, 1881

7 (out of 293) seats in the United States House of Representatives
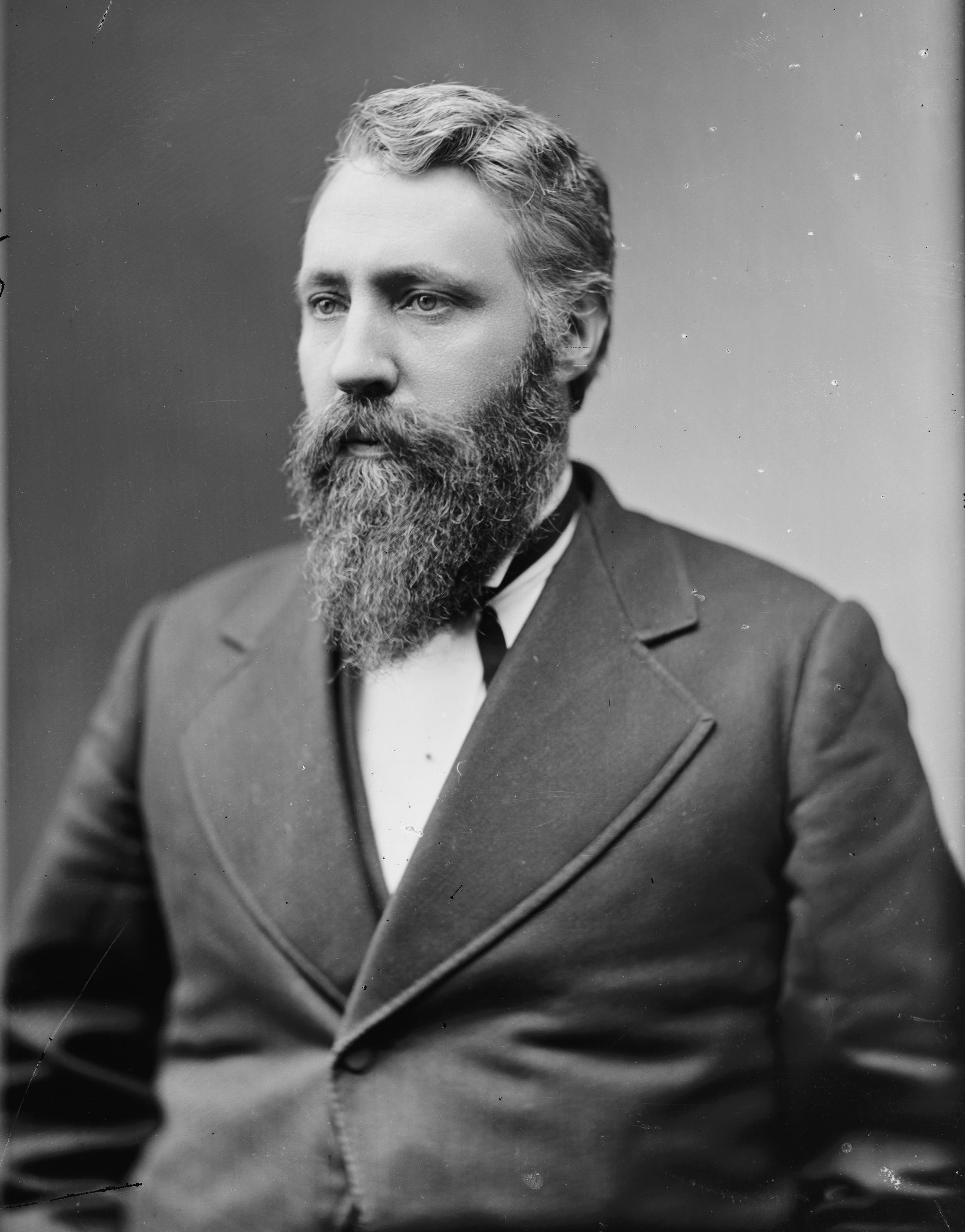

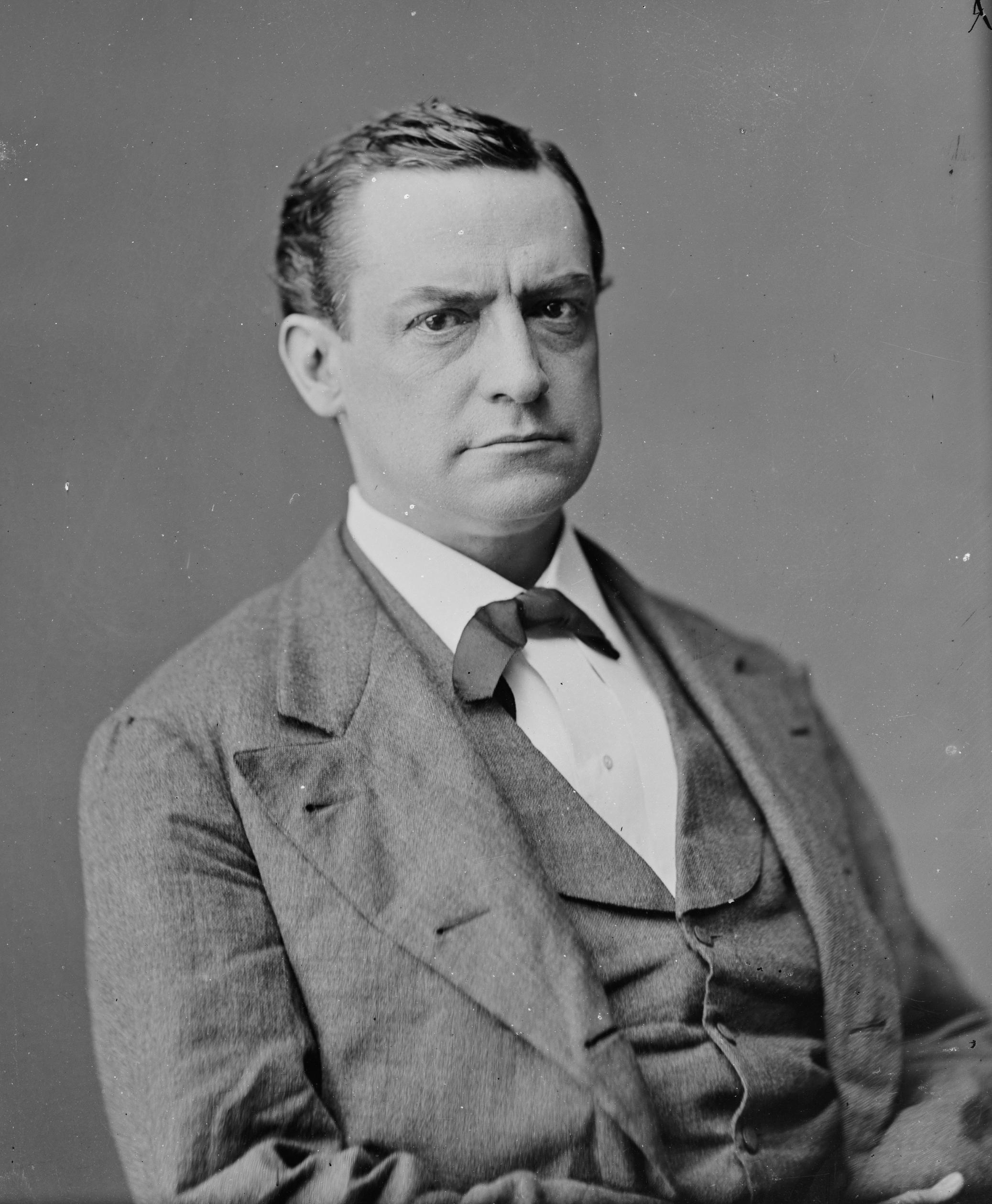
	Majority party	Minority party
Leader	J. Warren Keifer	Samuel J. Randall
Party	Republican	Democratic
Leader's seat	Ohio 4th	Pennsylvania 3rd
Seat change	Steady	▲2
Seats up	5	0
Races won	5	2
	Third party	Fourth party
Party	Greenback	Independent Democratic
Seat change	Steady	Steady
Seats up	0	0
Races won	0	0
	Fifth party
Party	Independent
Seat change	Steady
Seats up	0
Races won	0

There were seven special elections to the United States House of Representatives in 1881 during the 47th United States Congress.

== List of elections ==
Elections are listed by date and district.

District	Incumbent			This race	
District	Member	Party	First elected	Results	Candidates
Michigan 7	Vacant			Incumbent member-elect Omar D. Conger (R) resigned during previous congress. New member elected April 5, 1881 and seated December 5, 1881, with the rest of the House. Republican hold.	▌ ✓ John T. Rich (Republican) 55.84%; ▌Cyrenius P. Black (Democratic) 39.25%; ▌John Kinney (Greenback) 4.92%
New York 9	Vacant			Incumbent member-elect Fernando Wood (R) resigned during previous congress. New member elected November 8, 1881 and seated December 5, 1881, with the rest of the House. Democratic gain.	▌ ✓ John Hardy (Democratic) 62.64%; ▌Thomas Murphy (Republican) 37.09%; ▌Frank W. Roscoe (Greenback) 0.28%
New York 11	Levi P. Morton	Republican	1878	Incumbent resigned March 21, 1881, to become U.S. Minister to France. New member elected November 8, 1881 and seated December 5, 1881, with the rest of the House. Democratic gain.	▌ ✓ Roswell P. Flower (Democratic) 55.71%; ▌William W. Astor (Republican) 43.9%; ▌Charles Smith (Greenback) 0.39%
New York 22	Warner Miller	Republican	1878	Incumbent resigned July 26, 1881, when elected U.S. Senator. New member elected November 8, 1881 and seated December 5, 1881, with the rest of the House. Republican hold.	▌ ✓ Charles R. Skinner (Republican) 55.38%; ▌John Lansing (Democratic) 44.62%
New York 27	Elbridge G. Lapham	Republican	1874	Incumbent resigned July 29, 1881, when elected U.S. Senator. New member elected November 8, 1881 and seated December 5, 1881, with the rest of the House. Republican hold.	▌ ✓ James W. Wadsworth (Republican) 54.17%; ▌James Faulkner (Democratic) 43.05%; ▌Albert Heath (Greenback) 2.78%
Maine 2	William P. Frye	Republican	1870	Incumbent resigned March 17, 1881, when elected U.S. Senator. New member elected September 12, 1881 and seated December 5, 1881, with the rest of the House. Republican hold.	▌ ✓ Nelson Dingley Jr. (Republican) 65.96%; ▌Washington Gilbert (Greenback) 34.04%
Rhode Island 1	Nelson W. Aldrich	Republican	1878	Incumbent resigned when elected U.S. Senator. New member elected November 22, 1881 and seated December 5, 1881, with the rest of the House. Republican hold.	▌ ✓ Henry J. Spooner (Republican) 66.72%; ▌Henry T. Sisson (Democratic) 20.26%; ▌Charles C. Van Zandt (Republican) 13.02%
