= William Kueffner =

American lawyer

- William Charles Kueffner during the American Civil War
- Born: February 27, 1840; Germany
- Died: March 18, 1893 (aged 53); Belleville, Illinois, US
- Burial place: Walnut Hill Cemetery, Belleville
- Military career
- Allegiance: United States
- Branch: Union Army
- Rank: Brigadier General
- Unit: 9th Illinois Infantry
- Commands: 149th Illinois Volunteer Infantry
- Conflicts: American Civil War; Western Theater
- Other work: Attorney

William Charles Kueffner (February 27, 1840 – March 18, 1893) was an officer in the Union Army during the American Civil War who served in the 9th Illinois Infantry in the Western Theater in several campaigns. He was later brevetted as a brigadier general for bravery in combat and was a noted attorney in southern Illinois following the war.

== Biography ==
Kueffner was born in Germany. He lived in Mecklenburg before emigrating to the United States. He settled in the Hill Country of Texas in the German-American community, where he was an outspoken opponent of slavery. He moved North on the outbreak of the Civil War and relocated to Belleville, Illinois. He subsequently joined the Union Army and was commissioned as a captain in the 9th Illinois Infantry. Over the next four years, he took part in 110 engagements and was wounded four times.

Following his final battle wound, he was transferred to the 23rd Veterans Reserve Corps, with whom he served in non-combat areas. However, very late in the war, he had recovered sufficiently to become the colonel and commander of the 149th Illinois Volunteer Infantry. He was brevetted Brigadier General, U.S. Volunteers in the omnibus promotions following the war, backdated to March 13, 1865, for "gallant and meritorious services".

After the war, Kueffner was the collector of internal revenue for the 12th district of Illinois until removed in 1869 by order of President Ulysses S. Grant for political reasons. He then studied law, passed his bar exam, and established a profitable legal practice. He became one of Belleville's and Southern Illinois' most outstanding lawyers.

Kueffer died in the spring of 1893 at the age of 53. He was buried in the Walnut Hill Cemetery in Belleville. He is honored there with an impressive stone statue.
