= Benjamin Le Fevre =

American politician (1838–1922)

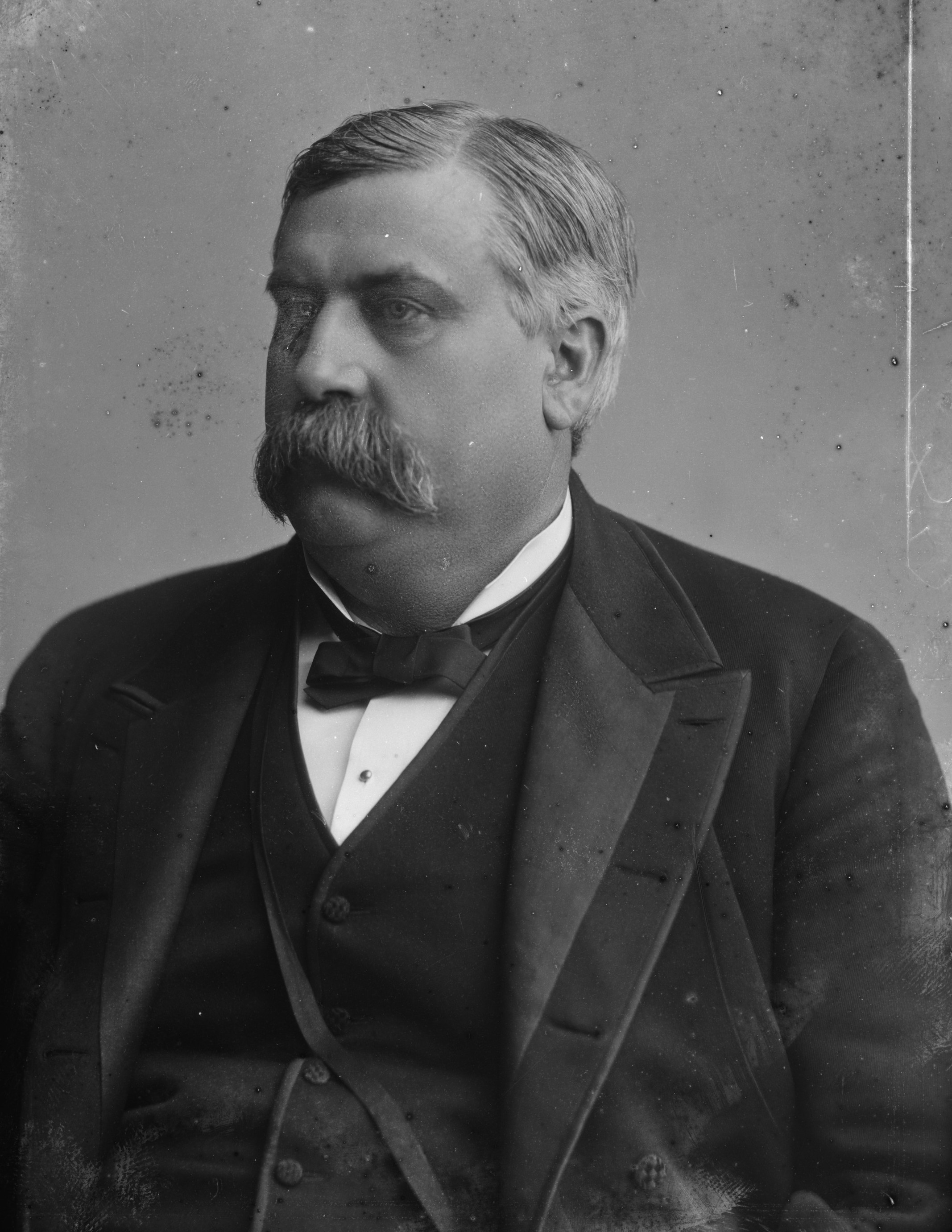
- Le Fevre photographed by C. M. Bell

Member of the U.S. House of Representatives from Ohio's 5th district
- In office March 4, 1879 – March 3, 1887
- Preceded by: Americus V. Rice
- Succeeded by: George E. Seney

Personal details
- Born: Benjamin Le Fevre; October 8, 1838 Maplewood, Ohio, U.S.
- Died: March 7, 1922 (aged 83) Atlantic City, New Jersey, U.S.
- Resting place: Glen Cemetery in Salem Township
- Party: Democratic
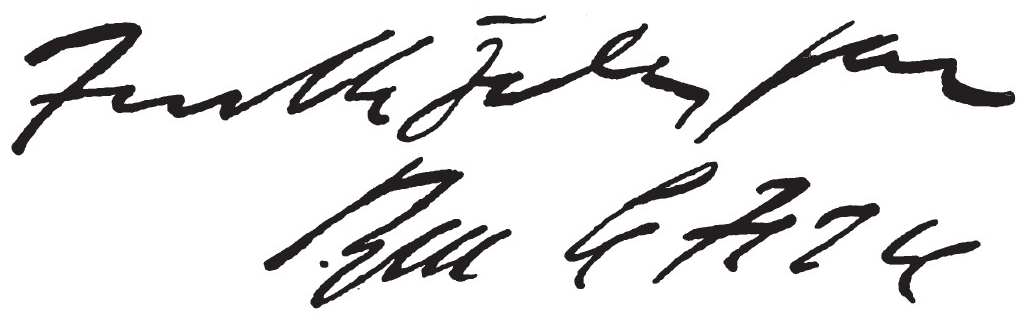
- Signature

Military service
- Allegiance: United States of America; Union
- Branch/service: Union Army
- Years of service: 1861-1865
- Rank: Brevet Brigadier General
- Unit: 15th Ohio Volunteer Infantry Regiment
- Battles/wars: American Civil War

Benjamin Le Fevre (October 8, 1838 – March 7, 1922) was a nineteenth-century American politician and Civil War veteran from Ohio. He served four terms in the United States House of Representatives from 1879 to 1887.

== Biography ==
Born near Maplewood, Ohio, Le Fevre attended Miami University in 1858 and 1859 and studied law in Sidney, Ohio.

=== Civil War ===
At the outbreak of the Civil War, he enlisted in the Union Army in 1861, serving until the end of the war, being mustered out as major of the 15th Ohio Volunteer Infantry Regiment.

=== Political career ===
He was a member of the Ohio House of Representatives in 1865 and was nominated as a Democrat for Secretary of State of Ohio in 1866. He was United States consul in Nuremberg, Bavaria from 1867 to 1869.

=== Congress ===
Le Fevre was elected a Democrat to the United States House of Representatives in 1878, serving from 1879 to 1887, not being a candidate for renomination in 1886.

=== Later career ===
Afterwards, he was a mail contract agent for the Erie Railroad, had retired from political activities and engaged in agricultural pursuits in Salem Township, Shelby County, Ohio.

=== Death and burial ===
Le Fevre died in Atlantic City, New Jersey, on March 7, 1922, and was interred in Glen Cemetery in Salem Township.

== See also ==
U.S. House of Representatives
Preceded by Americus V. Rice	Member of the U.S. House of Representatives from Ohio's 5th congressional district March 4, 1879 – March 3, 1883	Succeeded by George E. Seney
Preceded by Emanuel Shultz	Member of the U.S. House of Representatives from Ohio's 4th congressional district March 4, 1883 – March 3, 1885	Succeeded by Charles M. Anderson
Preceded by George E. Seney	Member of the U.S. House of Representatives from Ohio's 5th congressional district March 4, 1885 – March 3, 1887	Succeeded by George E. Seney
