= John Hardy (New York politician) =

American politician

Member of the U.S. House of Representatives from New York's 9th district
- In office December 5, 1881 – March 3, 1885
- Preceded by: Fernando Wood
- Succeeded by: Joseph Pulitzer

Member of the New York State Assembly from the New York County, 11th district
- In office January 1, 1861 – December 31, 1861
- Preceded by: Cummings H. Tucker
- Succeeded by: Noah A. Childs

Personal details
- Born: September 19, 1835 Scotland
- Died: December 9, 1913 (aged 78) New York City, New York
- Party: Democratic

John Hardy (September 19, 1835 – December 9, 1913) was an American lawyer and politician was a United States representative from New York State, serving two terms from 1881 to 1885.

== Biography ==
Hardy was born in Scotland on September 19, 1835. He immigrated to the United States in 1839 with his parents, who settled in New York City. He attended the public schools and graduated from the College of the City of New York in 1853; studied law; was admitted to the bar in 1861 and commenced practice in New York City.

=== Political career ===
He was member of the New York State Assembly (New York Co., 11th D.) in 1861. He was member of the board of aldermen of New York City in 1863, 1864, and from 1867 to 1869; clerk of the common council in 1870 and 1871; chief clerk in the office of the mayor in 1877 and 1878.

=== Congress ===
He was elected as a Democrat to the 47th United States Congress to fill the vacancy caused by the death of Fernando Wood; reelected to the 48th United States Congress and served from December 5, 1881, until March 3, 1885; unsuccessful candidate for reelection in 1884.

=== Later career and death ===
He resumed the practice of law in New York City and died there December 9, 1913; he was buried in Green-Wood Cemetery, Brooklyn, N.Y.

New York State Assembly
Preceded by Cummings H. Tucker	New York State Assembly; New York County, 11th District; 1861	Succeeded by Noah A. Childs
U.S. House of Representatives
Preceded by Fernando Wood	Member of the U.S. House of Representatives from New York's 9th congressional district 1881–1885	Succeeded by Joseph Pulitzer
