= 1876–77 United States House of Representatives elections =

House elections for the 45th U.S. Congress

- June 5, 1876 – March 1877 (Note: Regular elections, not specials) (Note: Most states held their elections November 7, 1876.)

All 293 seats in the United States House of Representatives 147 seats needed for a majority
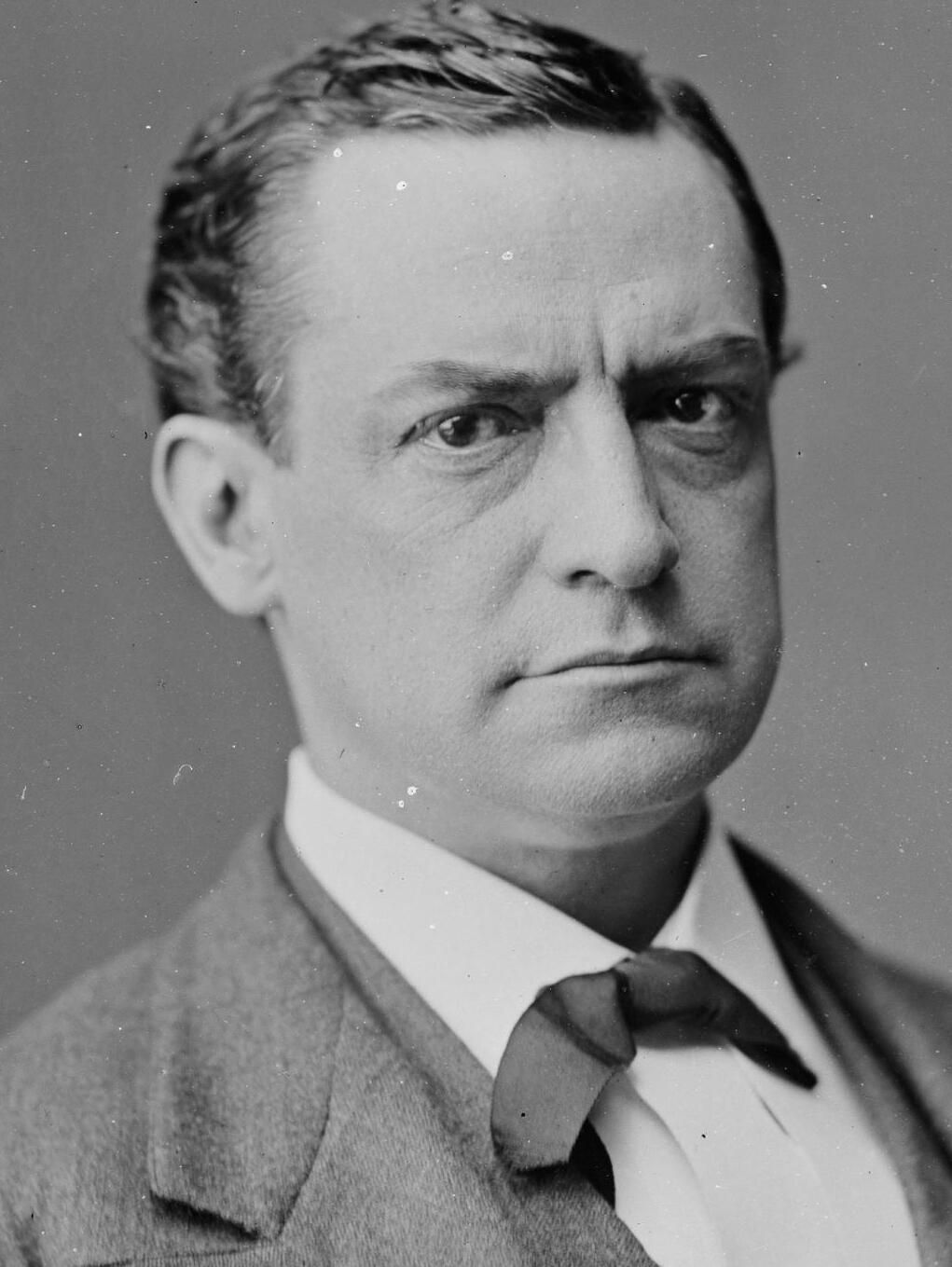

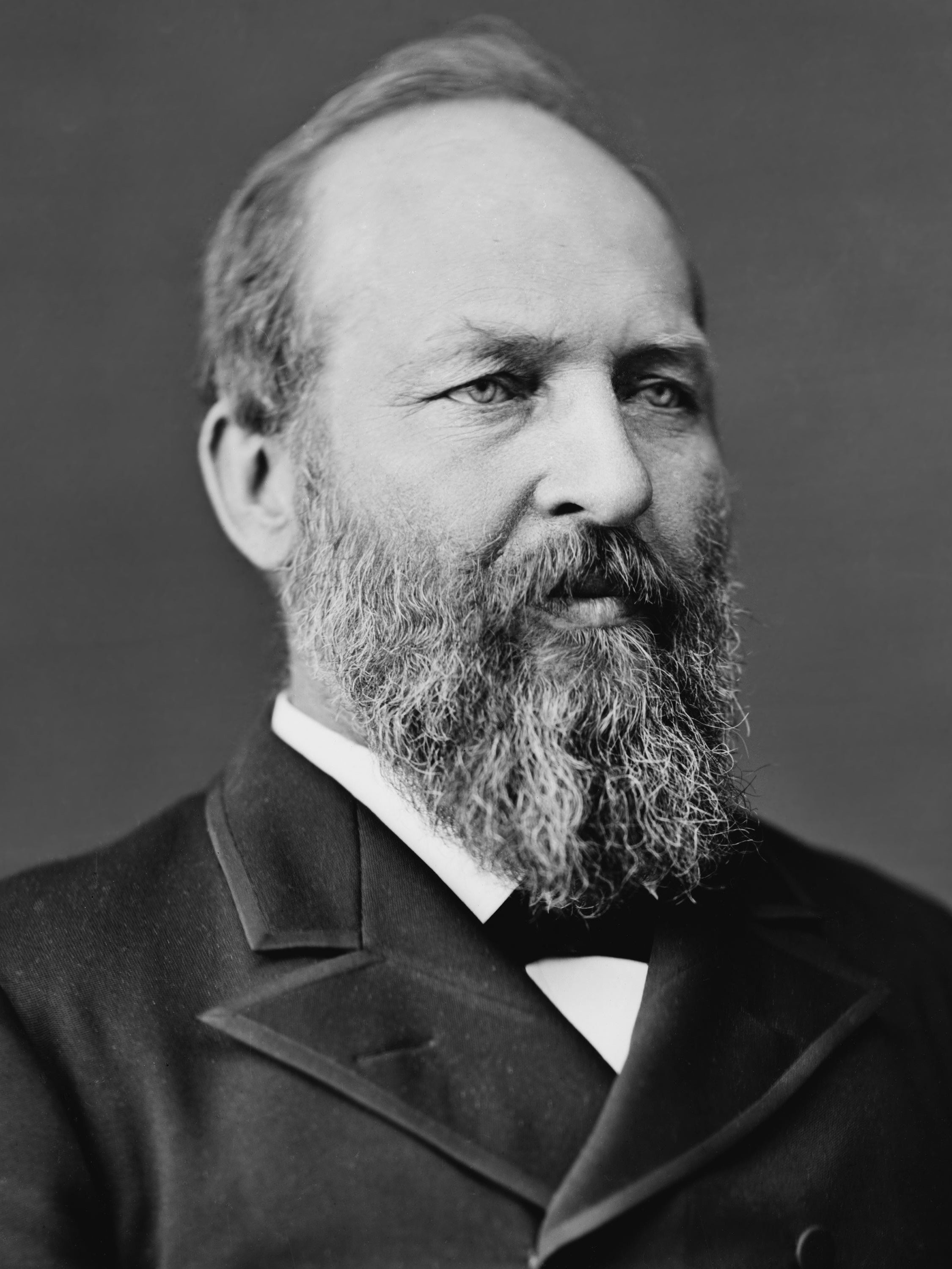
	Majority party	Minority party
Leader	Samuel J. Randall	James A. Garfield
Party	Democratic	Republican
Leader's seat	Pennsylvania 3rd	Ohio 19th
Last election	180 seats	103 seats
Seats won	155 (Note: There is a significant discrepancy for the party totals in the U.S House resulting from the 1874 elections between Dubin (p. 241, who records 150 Democrats, 2 Independent Democrats, and 141 Republicans), and Martis (pp. 130–131). The discrepancy seems to be accounted for by the fact that Dubin's party figures represent the party totals on the first day of the 45th United States Congress, while Martis' figures take into account the results of later contested elections (all of which were decided in favor of the Democratic candidates who challenged the election results).)	136
Seat change	▼25	▲33
Popular vote	4,220,480	3,825,311
Percentage	51.27%	46.47%
Swing	▲2.15pp	▲2.09pp
	Third party
Party	Independent
Last election	4 seats (Note: Included 1 Independent Democrat.) (Note: Included 3 Independent Republicans.)
Seats won	2 (Note: Includes 2 Independent Democrats)
Seat change	▼2
Popular vote	96,318
Percentage	1.17%
Swing	▼3.27pp
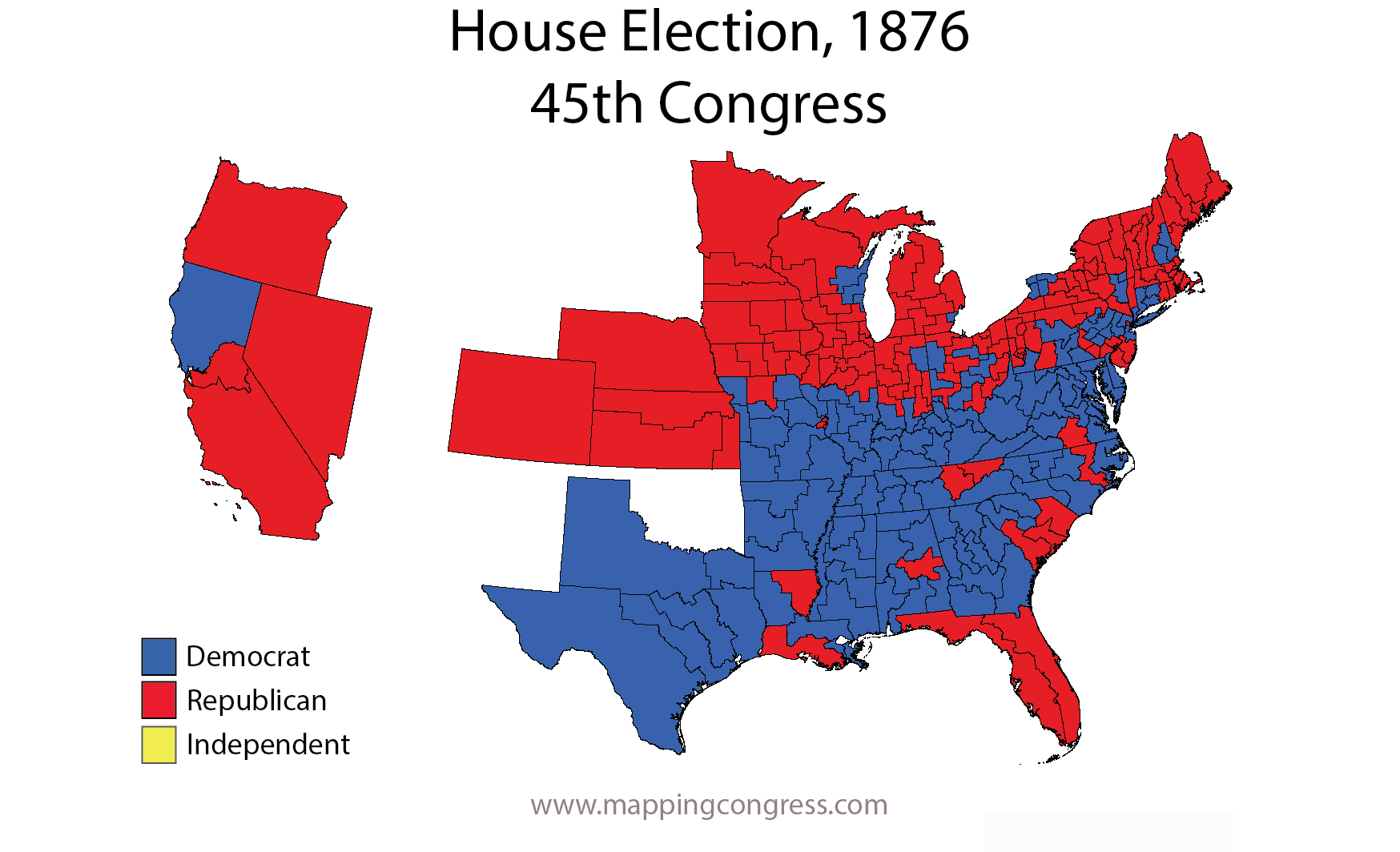
- Map of U.S. House elections results from 1876 elections for 45th Congress
Speaker before election
Vacancy
Democratic
Elected Speaker
Samuel Randall
Democratic

The 1876–77 United States House of Representatives elections were held on various dates in various states between June 5, 1876, and March 13, 1877. Each state set its own date for its elections to the House of Representatives before the first session of the 45th United States Congress convened on October 15, 1877. The size of the House increased to 293 seats with the addition of the new state of Colorado.

These elections coincided with the (heavily contested) election of President Rutherford B. Hayes and the United States Centennial. Hayes' Republican Party was able to recover from the Democratic Party many of the seats it had lost two years before as the economy improved slightly. However, the Democrats retained a majority and were able to use the people's lack of interest in Republican Reconstruction-led projects to help keep crucial seats. Republican congressional leadership had a difficult time distancing itself from the corruption of the Ulysses S. Grant administration or the legislature's impact on the economy downturn.

== Election summaries ==
↓
157	136
Democratic	Republican

State	Type	Total seats	Democratic		Republican	
State	Type	Total seats	Seats	Change	Seats	Change
Alabama	District	8	8	▲2	0	▼2
Arkansas	District	4	4 (Note: Includes 1 Independent Democrat.)	Steady	0	Steady
California	District	4	2	▼1	2	▲1
Colorado	At-large	1	1	▲1	0	▼1
Connecticut	District	4	3	Steady	1	Steady
Delaware	At-large	1	1	Steady	0	Steady
Florida	District	2	2	▲1	0	▼1
Georgia	District	9	9	Steady	0	Steady
Illinois	District	19	8	▼2	11	▲4
Indiana	District	13	4	▼4	9	▲4
Iowa	District	9	0	▼1	9	▲1
Kansas	District	3	0	▼1	3	▲1
Kentucky	District	10	10	▲1	0	▼1
Louisiana	District	6	5	▲1	1	▼1
Maine	District	5	0	Steady	5	Steady
Maryland	District	6	6	Steady	0	Steady
Massachusetts	District	11	2	▼1	9	▲4
Michigan	District	9	1	▼2	8	▲2
Minnesota	District	3	0	Steady	3	Steady
Mississippi	District	6	6	▲2	0	▼2
Missouri	District	13	9	▼4	4	▲4
Nebraska	At-large	1	0	Steady	1	Steady
Nevada	At-large	1	0	Steady	1	Steady
New Hampshire (Note: Elections held late)	District	3	1	▼1	2	▲1
New Jersey	District	7	4	▼1	3	▲1
New York	District	33	16	▼1	17	▲1
North Carolina	District	8	7	Steady	1	Steady
Ohio	District	20	8	▼5	12	▲5
Oregon	At-large	1	0	▼1	1	▲1
Pennsylvania	District	27	10	▼7	17	▲7
Rhode Island	District	2	0	Steady	2	Steady
South Carolina	District	5	2	▲2	3	▼2
Tennessee	District	10	8	▼1	2	▲1
Texas	District	6	6	Steady	0	Steady
Vermont	District	3	0	Steady	3	Steady
Virginia	District	9	8	Steady	1	Steady
West Virginia	District	3	3	Steady	0	Steady
Wisconsin	District	8	3	Steady	5	Steady
Total		293	157 53.6%	▼27	136 46.4%	▲31

Popular vote
Democratic	51.27%
Independent	1.17%
Republican	46.47%
Others	1.09%

House seats
Democratic	52.90%
Independent	0.68%
Republican	46.42%

The previous election included 4 Independents, in Illinois and Massachusetts.

Results shaded according to winning candidate's share of the vote

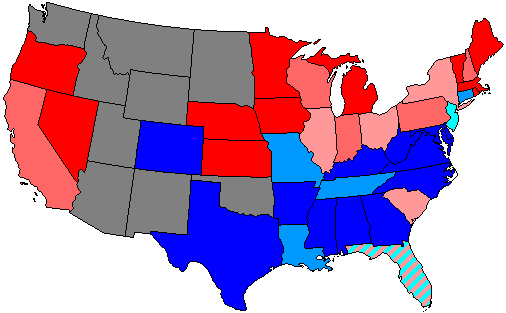
House seats by party holding plurality in state: 80+% Democratic / 80+% Republican; 60+ to 80% Democratic / 60+ to 80% Republican; Up to 60% Democratic / Up to 60% Republican

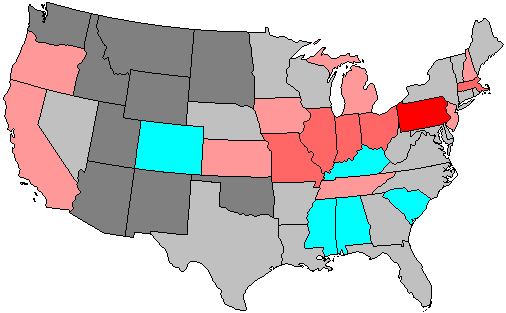
Net gain in party representation: 6+ Democratic gain / 6+ Republican gain; 3-5 Democratic gain / 3-5 Republican gain; 1-2 Democratic gain / 1-2 Republican gain; no net change

== Election dates ==
In 1845, Congress passed a law providing for a uniform nationwide date for choosing Presidential electors. This law did not affect election dates for Congress, which remained within the jurisdiction of State governments, but over time, the states moved their congressional elections to this date as well. In 1876–77, there were still 8 states with earlier election dates, and 1 state with a later election date.

Elections before Election Day (United States):

- June 5: Oregon
- September 5: Vermont
- September 11: Maine
- October 4:Georgia
- October 10: Indiana, Iowa, Ohio, West Virginia

Standard Election Day:

- November 7, 1876

Election after Election Day:

- March 13, 1877: New Hampshire

== Special elections ==
District	Incumbent			This race	
District	Member	Party	First elected	Results	Candidates
Connecticut 3	Henry H. Starkweather	Republican	1867	Incumbent died January 28, 1876. New member elected April 12, 1876. Republican hold. Winner later re-elected to the next term; see below.	▌ ✓ John T. Wait (Republican) 54.5%; ▌David A. Welles (Democratic) 42.9%; ▌Elisha H. Palmer (Prohibition) 2.6%
Connecticut 4	William Barnum	Democratic	1867	Incumbent resigned May 18, 1876, when elected U.S. senator. New member elected November 7, 1876. Democratic hold. Winner also elected to the next term; see below.	▌ ✓ Levi Warner (Democratic) 52.5%; ▌Robbert Hubbard (Republican) 47.2%; ▌Elias B. Hilliard (Prohibition) 0.2%
Indiana 2
Indiana 3
Maine 3	James G. Blaine	Republican	1862	Incumbent resigned July 10, 1876. New member elected September 11, 1876. Republican hold. Winner retired after serving out the remainder of the term.	▌ ✓ Edwin Flye (Republican) 54.85%; ▌Isaac Reed (Democratic) 45.15%

== Alabama ==
Alabama redistricted and eliminated its at-large seats, going from 6 districts and 2 at-large seats to 8 districts. The state also elected a full delegation of Democrats, voting out the two Republicans.

District	Incumbent			This race	
District	Member	Party	First elected	Results	Candidates
Alabama 1	Charles Hays; Redistricted from the 4th district	Republican	1869	Incumbent retired. Democratic gain.	▌ ✓ James T. Jones (Democratic) 49.25%; ▌Frederick G. Bromberg (Ind. Democratic) 40.82%; ▌William W. Turner (Republican) 9.92%
Alabama 2	New district			New seat. Democratic gain.	▌ ✓ Hilary A. Herbert (Democratic) 54.90%; ▌Gerald B. Hall (Republican) 45.10%
Alabama 3	Jeremiah Norman Williams; Redistricted from the 2nd district	Democratic	1874	Incumbent re-elected.	▌ ✓ Jeremiah Norman Williams (Democratic) 78.34%; ▌William H. Betts (Republican) 21.66%
Alabama 4	Jeremiah Haralson; Redistricted from the 1st district	Republican	1874	Incumbent lost re-election. Democratic gain.	▌ ✓ Charles M. Shelley (Democratic) 37.77%; ▌Jeremiah Haralson (Republican) 33.93%; ▌James T. Rapier (Colored Republican) 28.30%
Alabama 5	New district			New seat. Democratic gain.	▌ ✓ Robert F. Ligon (Democratic) 65.77%; ▌D. B. Booth (Republican) 34.23%
Alabama 6	Goldsmith W. Hewitt	Democratic	1874	Incumbent re-elected.	▌ ✓ Goldsmith W. Hewitt (Democratic) 100%; Uncontested
Alabama 6	Burwell Boykin Lewis; Redistricted from the at-large district	Democratic	1874	Incumbent lost renomination. Democratic loss.	▌ ✓ Goldsmith W. Hewitt (Democratic) 100%; Uncontested
Alabama 7	William Henry Forney; Redistricted from the at-large district	Democratic	1874	Incumbent re-elected.	▌ ✓ William Henry Forney (Democratic) 100%; Uncontested
Alabama 7	Taul Bradford; Redistricted from the 3rd district	Democratic	1874	Incumbent retired. Democratic loss.	▌ ✓ William Henry Forney (Democratic) 100%; Uncontested
Alabama 7	John H. Caldwell; Redistricted from the 5th district	Democratic	1872	Incumbent retired. Democratic loss.	▌ ✓ William Henry Forney (Democratic) 100%; Uncontested
Alabama 8	New district			New seat. Democratic gain.	▌ ✓ William W. Garth (Democratic) 62.0%; ▌John B. McClellan (Ind. Democratic) 38.0%

== Arkansas ==
District	Incumbent			This race	
District	Member	Party	First elected	Results	Candidates
Arkansas 1	Lucien C. Gause	Democratic	1874	Incumbent re-elected.	▌ ✓ Lucien C. Gause (Democratic) 97.5%; Uncontested
Arkansas 2	William F. Slemons	Democratic	1874	Incumbent re-elected.	▌ ✓ William F. Slemons (Democratic) 53.7%; ▌Oliver P. Snyder (Republican) 47.6%
Arkansas 3	William W. Wilshire	Democratic	1872; 1874 (lost contest); 1874	Incumbent retired. Independent Democratic gain.	▌ ✓ Jordan E. Cravens (Ind. Democratic) 35.9%; ▌John McClure (Republican) 34.7%; ▌H. B. Stuart (Democratic) 25.7%
Arkansas 4	Thomas M. Gunter	Democratic	1872	Incumbent re-elected.	▌ ✓ Thomas M. Gunter (Democratic) 74.7%; ▌J.H. Huckleberry (Republican) 25.3%

== California ==
District	Incumbent			This race	
District	Member	Party	First elected	Results	Candidates
California 1	William Adam Piper	Democratic	1875	Incumbent lost re-election. Republican gain.	▌ ✓ Horace Davis (Republican) 53.3%; ▌William A. Piper (Democratic) 46.7%
California 2	Horace F. Page	Republican	1872	Incumbent re-elected.	▌ ✓ Horace F. Page (Republican) 56.7%; ▌G. J. Carpenter (Democratic) 43.3%
California 3	John K. Luttrell	Democratic	1872	Incumbent re-elected.	▌ ✓ John K. Luttrell (Democratic) 51.1%; ▌Joseph McKenna (Republican) 48.9%
California 4	Peter D. Wigginton	Democratic	1875	Incumbent lost re-election. Republican gain.	▌ ✓ Romualdo Pacheco (Republican) 50%; ▌Peter D. Wigginton (Democratic) 50%

== Colorado ==
There were two elections to the new state of Colorado.

=== 44th Congress ===
District	Incumbent			This race	
District	Member	Party	First elected	Results	Candidates
Colorado at-large	New district			New seat. Republican gain.	▌ ✓ James B. Belford (Republican) 52.0%; ▌ James B. Belford (Democratic) 48.0%

=== 45th Congress ===
District	Incumbent			This race	
District	Member	Party	First elected	Results	Candidates
Colorado at-large	James B. Belford	Republican	1876	Incumbent re-elected	▌ ✓ James B. Belford (Republican) 51.9%; ▌ Thomas M. Patterson (Democratic) 48.1%
Colorado at-large	James B. Belford	Republican	1876	Election successfully contested. New member seated December 13, 1877. Democratic gain.	▌ ✓ Thomas M. Patterson (Democratic); ▌ James B. Belford (Republican)

== Connecticut ==
Connecticut had been electing is members late in the cycle, even after the terms had begun. But starting in 1876, the state joined the others in electing its members on the November 7, 1876 Election Day. The delegation remained 3 Democrats and 1 Republican.

District	Incumbent			This race	
District	Member	Party	First elected	Results	Candidates
Connecticut 1	George M. Landers	Democratic	1875	Incumbent re-elected.	▌ ✓ George M. Landers (Democratic) 50.0%; ▌ Joseph R. Hawley (Republican) 49.5%
Connecticut 2	James Phelps	Democratic	1875	Incumbent re-elected.	▌ ✓ James Phelps (Democratic) 53.4%; ▌ Stephen Kellogg (Republican) 45.9%; ▌ [FNU] Cummings (Prohibition) 0.7%
Connecticut 3	John T. Wait	Republican	1876 (special)	Incumbent re-elected.	▌ ✓ John T. Wait (Republican) 53.8%; ▌ Thomas M. Waller (Democratic) 45.4%; ▌ Elisha H. Palmer (Prohibition) 0.8%
Connecticut 4	William Barnum	Democratic	1867	Incumbent resigned May 18, 1876, when elected U.S. senator. Democratic hold. Winner also elected to finish the current term; see above.	▌ ✓ Levi Warner (Democratic) 52.6%; ▌ Robbert Hubbard (Republican) 47.2%

== Delaware ==
District	Incumbent			This race	
District	Member	Party	First elected	Results	Candidates
Delaware at-large	James Williams	Democratic	1874	Incumbent re-elected.	▌ ✓ James Williams (Democratic) 55.4%; ▌ Levi C. Bird (Republican) 44.6%

== Florida ==
District	Incumbent			This race	
District	Member	Party	First elected	Results	Candidates
Florida 1	William J. Purman	Republican	1872	Incumbent lost re-election. Democratic gain.	▌ ✓ Robert H. M. Davidson (Democratic) 51.2%; ▌William J. Purman (Republican) 48.8%
Florida 2	Jesse J. Finley	Democratic	1874 (Note: After disputed election)	Incumbent lost re-election. (Note: The election in the Florida's 2nd district was extremely close, with initial returns showing a difference between the two candidates of only 3 votes. Finley challenged Bisbee's election and was eventually seated on February 20, 1879.); Republican gain.	▌ ✓ Horatio Bisbee Jr. (Republican) 50.04%; ▌Jesse J. Finley (Democratic) 49.96%

== Georgia ==
District	Incumbent			This race	
District	Member	Party	First elected	Results	Candidates
Georgia 1	Julian Hartridge	Democratic	1874	Incumbent re-elected.	▌ ✓ Julian Hartridge (Democratic) 65.9%; ▌ John E. Bryant (Republican) 34.1%
Georgia 2	William E. Smith	Democratic	1874	Incumbent re-elected.	▌ ✓ William E. Smith (Democratic) 63.0%; ▌ Richard H. Whiteley (Republican) 37.0%
Georgia 3	Philip Cook	Democratic	1872	Incumbent re-elected.	▌ ✓ Philip Cook (Democratic) 71.4%; ▌ W. P. Pierce (Republican) 28.6%
Georgia 4	Henry R. Harris	Democratic	1872	Incumbent re-elected.	▌ ✓ Henry R. Harris (Democratic) 70.5%; ▌ H. W. Hilliard (Republican) 29.5%
Georgia 5	Milton A. Candler	Democratic	1874	Incumbent re-elected.	▌ ✓ Milton A. Candler (Democratic) 67.5%; ▌ William Markham (Republican) 32.5%
Georgia 6	James H. Blount	Democratic	1872	Incumbent re-elected.	▌ ✓ James H. Blount (Democratic) 74.0%; ▌ Samuel G. Gove (Republican) 26.1%
Georgia 7	William H. Felton	Independent; Democratic	1874	Incumbent re-elected.	▌ ✓ William H. Felton (Ind. Democratic) 55.1%; ▌ W. H. Dabney (Democratic) 44.9%
Georgia 8	Alexander H. Stephens	Democratic	1872	Incumbent re-elected.	▌ ✓ Alexander H. Stephens (Democratic) 91.9%; ▌ [FNU] Tennelle (Republican) 8.1%
Georgia 9	Benjamin Harvey Hill	Democratic	1875	Incumbent re-elected.	▌ ✓ Benjamin Harvey Hill (Democratic) 100.0%

== Illinois ==
District	Incumbent			This race	
District	Member	Party	First elected	Results	Candidates
Illinois 1	Bernard G. Caulfield	Democratic	1874	Incumbent retired. Republican gain.	▌ ✓ William Aldrich (Republican) 53.2%; ▌ John Randolph Hoxie (Democratic) 45.2%; ▌ George S. Bowen (Greenback) 1.6%
Illinois 2	Carter Harrison III	Democratic	1874	Incumbent re-elected.	▌ ✓ Carter Harrison III (Democratic) 50.9%; ▌ George R. Davis (Republican) 48.7%; ▌ S. F. Norton (Greenback) 0.4%
Illinois 3	John V. Le Moyne	Democratic	1874	Incumbent lost re-election. Republican gain.	▌ ✓ Lorenzo Brentano (Republican) 50.6%; ▌ John V. Le Moyne (Democratic) 49.4%
Illinois 4	Stephen A. Hurlbut	Republican	1872	Incumbent lost renomination and lost re-election as an Independent Republican candidate. Republican hold.	▌ ✓ William Lathrop (Republican) 48.4%; ▌ John F. Farnsworth (Democratic) 29.8%; ▌ Stephen A. Hurlbut (Independent Republican) 21.9%
Illinois 5	Horatio C. Burchard	Republican	1869	Incumbent re-elected.	▌ ✓ Horatio C. Burchard (Republican) 59.8%; ▌ J. Pattison (Democratic) 40.2%
Illinois 6	Thomas J. Henderson	Republican	1874	Incumbent re-elected.	▌ ✓ Thomas J. Henderson (Republican) 60.6%; ▌ Charles Dunham (Democratic) 38.3%; ▌ Austin Sykes (Greenback) 1.1%
Illinois 7	Alexander Campbell	Independent	1874	Incumbent lost re-election. Republican gain.	▌ ✓ Philip C. Hayes (Republican) 52.7%; ▌ Alexander Campbell (Greenback/Democratic) 47.3%
Illinois 8	Greenbury L. Fort	Republican	1872	Incumbent re-elected.	▌ ✓ Greenbury L. Fort (Republican) 55.1%; ▌ George W. Parker (Democratic) 44.9%
Illinois 9	Richard H. Whiting	Republican	1874	Incumbent retired. Republican hold.	▌ ✓ Thomas A. Boyd (Republican) 49.8%; ▌ George A. Wilson (Democratic) 47.9%; ▌ H. M. Matthews (Greenback) 2.3%
Illinois 10	John C. Bagby	Democratic	1874	Incumbent retired. Republican gain.	▌ ✓ Benjamin F. Marsh (Republican) 51.1%; ▌ John H. Hungate (Democratic) 48.4%; ▌ J. L. Christie (Greenback) 0.5%
Illinois 11	Scott Wike	Democratic	1874	Incumbent lost renomination. Democratic hold.	▌ ✓ Robert M. Knapp (Democratic) 58.7%; ▌ Joseph Robbins (Republican) 41.2%
Illinois 12	William M. Springer	Democratic	1874	Incumbent re-elected.	▌ ✓ William M. Springer (Democratic) 55.8%; ▌ David L. Philipps (Republican) 44.1%; ▌ J. A. Edie (Prohibition) 0.1%
Illinois 13	Adlai Stevenson I	Democratic	1874	Incumbent lost re-election. Republican gain.	▌ ✓ Thomas F. Tipton (Republican) 50.4%; ▌ Adlai Stevenson I (Democratic) 49.6%
Illinois 14	Joseph G. Cannon	Republican	1872	Incumbent re-elected.	▌ ✓ Joseph G. Cannon (Republican) 52.0%; ▌ John C. Black (Democratic) 48.0%
Illinois 15	John R. Eden	Democratic	1872	Incumbent re-elected.	▌ ✓ John R. Eden (Democratic) 57.5%; ▌ George D. Chafee (Republican) 42.3%; ▌ Andrew J. Hunter (Prohibition) 0.2%
Illinois 16	William A. J. Sparks	Democratic	1874	Incumbent re-elected.	▌ ✓ William A. J. Sparks (Democratic) 53.3%; ▌ Edwin M. Ashcraft (Republican) 46.7%
Illinois 17	William R. Morrison	Democratic	1872	Incumbent re-elected.	▌ ✓ William R. Morrison (Democratic) 56.7%; ▌ Henry S. Baker (Republican) 43.3%
Illinois 18	William Hartzell	Democratic	1874	Incumbent re-elected.	▌ ✓ William Hartzell (Democratic) 50.0%; ▌ Benjamin L. Wiley (Republican) 50.0%
Illinois 19	William B. Anderson	Independent	1874	Incumbent lost re-election. Democratic gain.	▌ ✓ Richard W. Townshend (Democratic) 44.3%; ▌ Edward Bonham (Republican) 29.8%; ▌ William B. Anderson (Independent) 26.0%

== Indiana ==
District	Incumbent			This race	
District	Member	Party	First elected	Results	Candidates
Indiana 1	Benoni S. Fuller	Democratic	1874	Incumbent re-elected.	▌ ✓ Benoni S. Fuller (Democratic) 50.6%; ▌ C. A. DeBruler (Republican) 45.2%; ▌ T. F. DeBruler (Greenback) 4.2%
Indiana 2	Andrew Humphreys	Democratic	1876	Incumbent retired. Democratic hold.	▌ ✓ Thomas R. Cobb (Democratic) 56.3%; ▌ Lewis Loveless (Republican) 40.9%; ▌ J. W. Crawford (Greenback) 2.8%
Indiana 3	Nathan T. Carr	Democratic	1876	Incumbent retired. Democratic hold.	▌ ✓ George A. Bicknell (Democratic) 57.4%; ▌ [FNU] Newsom (Republican) 39.2%; ▌ George W. Carr (Greenback) 3.4%
Indiana 4	Jeptha D. New	Democratic	1874	Incumbent retired. Republican gain.	▌ ✓ Leonidas Sexton (Republican) 49.9%; ▌ Lewis J. Woolen (Democratic) 48.8%; ▌ William L. Bright (Greenback) 1.3%
Indiana 5	William S. Holman	Democratic	1866	Incumbent lost re-election. Republican gain.	▌ ✓ Thomas M. Browne (Republican) 52.5%; ▌ William S. Holman (Democratic) 47.5%
Indiana 6	Milton S. Robinson	Republican	1874	Incumbent re-elected.	▌ ✓ Milton S. Robinson (Republican) 49.3%; ▌ [FNU] Chambers (Democratic) 48.5%; ▌ [FNU] Pendleton (Greenback) 2.3%
Indiana 7	Franklin Landers	Democratic	1874	Incumbent lost re-election. Republican gain.	▌ ✓ John Hanna (Republican) 49.8%; ▌ Franklin Landers (Democratic) 46.2%; ▌ [FNU] Buchanan (Greenback) 4.0%
Indiana 8	Morton C. Hunter	Republican	1872	Incumbent re-elected.	▌ ✓ Morton C. Hunter (Republican) 44.4%; ▌ William E. McLean (Democratic) 41.0%; ▌ Cyrus E. Davis (Greenback) 14.6%
Indiana 9	Thomas J. Cason	Republican	1872	Incumbent lost renomination. Republican hold.	▌ ✓ Michael D. White (Republican) 50.0%; ▌ George McWilliams (Democratic) 39.9%; ▌ Leroy Templeton (Greenback) 10.1%
Indiana 10	William S. Haymond	Democratic	1874	Incumbent lost re-election. Republican gain.	▌ ✓ William H. Calkins (Republican) 51.8%; ▌ William S. Haymond (Democratic) 48.1%; ▌ [FNU] Majors (Greenback) 0.1%
Indiana 11	James L. Evans	Republican	1874	Incumbent re-elected.	▌ ✓ James L. Evans (Republican) 52.2%; ▌ A. F. Armstrong (Democratic) 47.8%
Indiana 12	Andrew H. Hamilton	Democratic	1874	Incumbent re-elected.	▌ ✓ Andrew H. Hamilton (Democratic) 58.5%; ▌ [FNU] Bonham (Republican) 39.5%; ▌ [FNU] Ninde (Greenback) 2.0%
Indiana 13	John Baker	Republican	1874	Incumbent re-elected.	▌ ✓ John Baker (Republican) 52.9%; ▌ Freeman Kelley (Democratic) 46.6%; ▌ Hiram P. Bennett (Greenback) 0.5%

== Iowa ==
District	Incumbent			This race	
District	Member	Party	First elected	Results	Candidates
Iowa 1	George W. McCrary	Republican	1868	Incumbent retired Republican hold.	▌ ✓ Joseph C. Stone (Republican) 53.4%; ▌ Wesley C. Hobbs (Democratic) 46,1%; ▌ Arthur S. Garretson (Greenback) 0.5%
Iowa 2	John Q. Tufts	Republican	1874	Incumbent retired Republican hold.	▌ ✓ Hiram Price (Republican) 52.8%; ▌ Jeremiah H. Murphy (Democratic) 47.2%
Iowa 3	Lucien Lester Ainsworth	Democratic	1874	Incumbent retired. Republican gain.	▌ ✓ Theodore Weld Burdick (Republican) 51.5%; ▌ Jeffrey M. Griffith (Democratic) 47.6%; ▌ C. A. Gaylord (Greenback) 0.9%
Iowa 4	Henry Otis Pratt	Republican	1872	Incumbent retired Republican hold.	▌ ✓ Nathaniel C. Deering (Republican) 68.9%; ▌ Cyrus Foreman (Democratic) 31.1%
Iowa 5	James Wilson	Republican	1872	Incumbent retired Republican hold.	▌ ✓ Rush Clark (Republican) 60.4%; ▌ Nathan Worley (Democratic) 35.0%; ▌ George W. Rutherford (Greenback) 4.6%
Iowa 6	Ezekiel S. Sampson	Republican	1874	Incumbent re-elected.	▌ ✓ Ezekiel S. Sampson (Republican) 54.7%; ▌ Henry B. Hendershott (Democratic) 42.9%; ▌ D. M. Conley (Greenback) 2.1%
Iowa 7	John A. Kasson	Republican	1872	Incumbent retired Republican hold.	▌ ✓ Henry J. B. Cummings (Republican) 58.3%; ▌ Samuel J. Gilpin (Democratic) 34.9%; ▌ Andrew Hastie (Greenback) 6.5%
Iowa 8	James W. McDill	Republican	1872	Incumbent retired Republican hold.	▌ ✓ William F. Sapp (Republican) 56.0%; ▌ Lemuel R. Bolter (Democratic/Greenback) 44.0%
Iowa 9	S. Addison Oliver	Republican	1874	Incumbent re-elected.	▌ ✓ S. Addison Oliver (Republican) 63.5%; ▌ Samuel Rees (Democratic) 34.3%; ▌ W. A. Pierce (Greenback) 2.1%

== Kansas ==
District	Incumbent			This race	
District	Member	Party	First elected	Results	Candidates
Kansas 1	William A. Phillips	Republican	1872	Incumbent re-elected.	▌ ✓ William A. Phillips (Republican) 64.8%; ▌ Thomas Fenton (Democratic) 34.5%; ▌ Richard Wake (Prohibition) 0.4%; ▌ J. Wisebach (Greenback) 0.2%
Kansas 2	John R. Goodin	Democratic	1874	Incumbent lost re-election. Republican gain.	▌ ✓ Dudley C. Haskell (Republican) 55.7%; ▌ John R. Goodin (Democratic/Greenback) 44.2%; ▌ M. V. B. Knox (Prohibition) 0.2%
Kansas 3	William Ripley Brown	Republican	1874	Incumbent lost renomination. Republican hold.	▌ ✓ Thomas Ryan (Republican) 68.3%; ▌ Samuel J. Crawford (Democratic/Greenback) 31.6%; ▌ Pusey Graves (Prohibition) 0.1%

== Kentucky ==
District	Incumbent			This race	
District	Member	Party	First elected	Results	Candidates
Kentucky 1	Andrew Boone	Democratic	1874	Incumbent re-elected.	▌ ✓ Andrew Boone (Democratic) 45.1%; ▌ Oscar Turner (Ind. Democratic) 30.9%; ▌ H. H. Houston (Republican) 23.9%
Kentucky 2	John Y. Brown	Democratic	1872	Incumbent retired. Democratic hold.	▌ ✓ James A. McKenzie (Democratic) 65.2%; ▌ James Z. Moore (Republican) 34.8%
Kentucky 3	Charles W. Milliken	Democratic	1872	Incumbent retired. Democratic hold.	▌ ✓ John W. Caldwell (Democratic) 54.0%; ▌ E. L. Mottley (Republican) 43.1%; ▌ B. L. D. Guffy (Greenback) 2.9%
Kentucky 4	J. Proctor Knott	Democratic	1874	Incumbent re-elected.	▌ ✓ J. Proctor Knott (Democratic) 68.9%; ▌ John W. Lewis (Republican) 30.9%
Kentucky 5	Henry Watterson	Democratic	1876	Incumbent retired. Democratic hold.	▌ ✓ Albert S. Willis (Democratic) 73.0%; ▌ Walter Evans (Republican) 27.0%
Kentucky 6	Thomas L. Jones	Democratic	1874	Incumbent retired. Democratic hold.	▌ ✓ John G. Carlisle (Democratic) 66.9%; ▌ John J. Landrum (Republican) 33.1%
Kentucky 7	J. C. S. Blackburn	Democratic	1874	Incumbent re-elected.	▌ ✓ J. C. S. Blackburn (Democratic) 62.5%; ▌ T. O. Shackelford (Republican) 37.5%
Kentucky 8	Milton J. Durham	Democratic	1872	Incumbent re-elected.	▌ ✓ Milton J. Durham (Democratic) 55.0%; ▌ William O'Connell Bradley (Republican) 44.9%
Kentucky 9	John D. White	Republican	1874	Incumbent retired. Democratic gain.	▌ ✓ Thomas Turner (Democratic) 50.8%; ▌ Robert Boyd (Republican) 49.2%
Kentucky 10	John B. Clarke	Democratic	1874	Incumbent re-elected.	▌ ✓ John B. Clarke (Democratic) 57.7%; ▌ O. S. Deming (Republican) 42.3%

== Louisiana ==
District	Incumbent			This race	
District	Member	Party	First elected	Results	Candidates
Louisiana 1	Randall L. Gibson	Democratic	1874	Incumbent re-elected.	▌ ✓ Randall L. Gibson (Democratic) 55.4%; ▌ William M. Burwell (Republican) 44.6%
Louisiana 2	E. John Ellis	Democratic	1874	Incumbent re-elected.	▌ ✓ E. John Ellis (Democratic) 55.1%; ▌ Henry C. Dibble (Republican) 44.9%
Louisiana 3	Chester Bidwell Darrall	Republican	1868	Incumbent re-elected.	▌ ✓ Chester Bidwell Darrall (Republican) 51.8%; ▌ Joseph H. Acklen (Democratic) 48.2%
Louisiana 3	Chester Bidwell Darrall	Republican	1868	Election successfully contested. New member seated February 20, 1878. Democratic gain.	▌ ✓ Joseph H. Acklen (Democratic); ▌ Chester Bidwell Darrall (Republican)
Louisiana 4	William M. Levy	Democratic	1874	Incumbent lost renomination. Democratic hold.	▌ ✓ Joseph B. Elam (Democratic) 51.3%; ▌ George Luke Smith (Republican) 48.7%
Louisiana 5	William B. Spencer	Democratic	1876	Incumbent retired and resigned to become associate justice of the Louisiana Supreme Court. Republican gain.	▌ ✓ John E. Leonard (Republican) 52.6%; ▌ William W. Farmer (Democratic) 47.4%
Louisiana 6	Charles E. Nash	Republican	1874	Incumbent lost re-election. Democratic gain.	▌ ✓ Edward W. Robertson (Democratic) 58.2%; ▌ Charles E. Nash (Republican) 41.8%

== Maine ==
District	Incumbent			This race	
District	Member	Party	First elected	Results	Candidates
Maine 1	John H. Burleigh	Republican	1872	Incumbent lost renomination. Republican hold.	▌ ✓ Thomas B. Reed (Republican) 51.45%; ▌John M. Goodwin (Democratic) 47.99%; ▌John H. Burleigh (Republican) 0.56%
Maine 2	William P. Frye	Republican	1870	Incumbent re-elected.	▌ ✓ William P. Frye (Republican) 55.72%; ▌S. Clifford Belcher (Democratic) 42.04%; ▌Solon Chase (Greenback) 2.24%
Maine 3	Vacant			Rep. James G. Blaine (R) resigned July 10, 1876. Republican hold. Concurrent special election held to serve out the unexpired term; the winner did not stand for the regular election.	▌ ✓ Stephen Lindsey (Republican) 55.18%; ▌Edward K. O'Brien (Democratic) 44.83%
Maine 4	Harris M. Plaisted	Republican	1875 (special)	Incumbent retired. Republican hold.	▌ ✓ Llewellyn Powers (Republican) 53.83%; ▌John P. Donworth (Democratic) 42.12%; ▌Lyndon Oak (Independent Republican) 4.05%
Maine 5	Eugene Hale	Republican	1868	Incumbent re-elected.	▌ ✓ Eugene Hale (Republican) 55.34%; ▌William H. McLellan (Democratic) 44.66%

== Maryland ==
District	Incumbent			This race	
District	Member	Party	First elected	Results	Candidates
Maryland 1	Philip Francis Thomas	Democratic	1874	Incumbent retired. Democratic hold.	▌ ✓ Daniel M. Henry (Democratic) 56.2%; ▌ Thomas A. Spence (Republican) 43.8%
Maryland 2	Charles B. Roberts	Democratic	1874	Incumbent re-elected.	▌ ✓ Charles B. Roberts (Democratic) 55.6%; ▌ J. Morrison Harris (Republican) 44.4%
Maryland 3	William J. O'Brien	Democratic	1872	Incumbent retired. Democratic hold.	▌ ✓ William Kimmel (Democratic) 62.4%; ▌ W. E. Goldsborough (Republican) 37.6%
Maryland 4	Thomas Swann	Democratic	1868	Incumbent re-elected.	▌ ✓ Thomas Swann (Democratic) 54.5%; ▌ James H. Butler (Republican) 45.5%
Maryland 5	Eli J. Henkle	Democratic	1874	Incumbent re-elected.	▌ ✓ Eli J. Henkle (Democratic) 55.2%; ▌ John Henry Sellman (Republican) 44.8%
Maryland 6	William Walsh	Democratic	1874	Incumbent re-elected.	▌ ✓ William Walsh (Democratic) 50.0%; ▌ Louis E. McComas (Republican) 50.0%

== Massachusetts ==
District	Incumbent			This race	
District	Member	Party	First elected	Results	Candidates
Massachusetts 1	William W. Crapo	Republican	1875 (special)	Incumbent re-elected.	▌ ✓ William W. Crapo (Republican) 69.61%; ▌Joseph M. Day (Democratic) 30.39%
Massachusetts 2	Benjamin W. Harris	Republican	1872	Incumbent re-elected.	▌ ✓ Benjamin W. Harris (Republican) 61.45%; ▌Edward Avery (Democratic) 38.55%
Massachusetts 3	Henry L. Pierce	Republican	1874	Incumbent retired. New member elected after initial result overturned. Democratic gain.	▌ ✓ Benjamin Dean (Democratic) 50.04%; ▌Walbridge A. Field (Republican) 49.96%
Massachusetts 4	Josiah Gardner Abbott	Democratic	1874	Incumbent retired. Democratic hold.	▌ ✓ Leopold Morse (Democratic) 52.66%; ▌Rufus S. Frost (Republican) 47.34%
Massachusetts 5	Nathaniel P. Banks	Republican	1874	Incumbent re-elected.	▌ ✓ Nathaniel P. Banks (Republican) 51.97%; ▌Richard Frothingham Jr. (Democratic) 48.03%
Massachusetts 6	Charles Perkins Thompson	Democratic	1874	Incumbent lost re-election. Republican gain.	▌ ✓ George B. Loring (Republican) 52.44%; ▌Charles Perkins Thompson (Democratic) 47.56%
Massachusetts 7	John K. Tarbox	Democratic	1874	Incumbent lost re-election. Republican gain.	▌ ✓ Benjamin Butler (Republican) 51.63%; ▌John K. Tarbox (Democratic) 40.02%; ▌Ebenezer R. Hoar (Ind. Republican) 8.34%
Massachusetts 8	John M. S. Williams	Democratic	1874	Incumbent lost re-election. Republican gain.	▌ ✓ William Claflin (Republican) 53.27%; ▌William W. Warren (Democratic) 46.73%
Massachusetts 9	George F. Hoar	Republican	1868	Incumbent retired to run for U.S. Senate. Republican hold.	▌ ✓ William W. Rice (Republican) 57.54%; ▌George F. Verry (Democratic) 42.46%
Massachusetts 10	Charles A. Stevens	Republican	1875 (special)	Incumbent retired. Republican hold.	▌ ✓ Amasa Norcross (Republican) 63.86%; ▌Samuel O. Lamb (Democratic) 36.14%
Massachusetts 11	Chester W. Chapin	Democratic	1874	Incumbent lost re-election. Republican gain.	▌ ✓ George D. Robinson (Republican) 54.01%; ▌Chester W. Chapin (Democratic) 44.22%

== Michigan ==
District	Incumbent			This race	
District	Member	Party	First elected	Results	Candidates
Michigan 1	Alpheus S. Williams	Democratic	1874	Incumbent re-elected.	▌ ✓ Alpheus S. Williams (Democratic) 50.5%; ▌ Henry M. Duffield (Republican) 43.3%; ▌ John V. Renkle (Greenback) 6.1%
Michigan 2	Henry Waldron	Republican	1870	Incumbent retired. Republican hold.	▌ ✓ Edwin Willits (Republican) 52.0%; ▌ John J. Robison (Democratic/Greenback) 46.1%; ▌ George L Granger Jr. (Independent Greenback) 1.2%; ▌ [FNU] Hathaway (Prohibition) 0.5%
Michigan 3	George Willard	Republican	1872	Incumbent retired. Republican hold.	▌ ✓ Jonas H. McGowan (Republican) 51.8%; ▌ Fidus Livermore (Democratic) 44.9%; ▌ Edgar Thomas (Greenback) 1.8%; ▌ [FNU] Woodmansee (Prohibition) 0.6%
Michigan 4	Allen Potter	Democratic	1874	Incumbent retired. Republican gain.	▌ ✓ Edwin W. Keightley (Republican) 53.4%; ▌ Henry Chamberlain (Democratic/Greenback) 46.6%
Michigan 5	William B. Williams	Republican	1873	Incumbent retired. Republican hold.	▌ ✓ John W. Stone (Republican) 54.1%; ▌ Myron Harris (Democratic/Greenback) 45.8%; ▌ David Irish (Prohibition) 0.1%
Michigan 6	George H. Durand	Democratic	1874	Incumbent lost re-election. Republican gain.	▌ ✓ Mark S. Brewer (Republican) 51.9%; ▌ George H. Durand (Democratic) 48.1%
Michigan 7	Omar D. Conger	Republican	1868	Incumbent re-elected.	▌ ✓ Omar D. Conger (Republican) 54.1%; ▌ Anson E. Chadwick (Democratic) 45.1%; ▌ Justin R. Whiting (Greenback) 0.8%
Michigan 8	Nathan B. Bradley	Republican	1872	Incumbent retired. Republican hold.	▌ ✓ Charles C. Ellsworth (Republican) 50.5%; ▌ Frederic H. Potter (Democratic) 49.5%
Michigan 9	Jay A. Hubbell	Republican	1872	Incumbent re-elected.	▌ ✓ Jay A. Hubbell (Republican) 59.0%; ▌ John H. Kilbourne (Democratic/Greenback) 41.0%

== Minnesota ==
District	Incumbent			This race	
District	Member	Party	First elected	Results	Candidates
Minnesota 1	Mark H. Dunnell	Republican	1870	Incumbent re-elected.	▌ ✓ Mark H. Dunnell (Republican) 61.8%; ▌ E. C. Stacey (Democratic/Greenback) 38.2%
Minnesota 2	Horace B. Strait	Republican	1872	Incumbent re-elected.	▌ ✓ Horace B. Strait (Republican) 52.5%; ▌ E. T. Wilder (Democratic) 39.9%; ▌ Ignatius L. Donnelly (Greenback) 7.7%
Minnesota 3	William S. King	Republican	1874	Incumbent retired. Republican hold.	▌ ✓ Jacob H. Stewart (Republican) 52.4%; ▌ William W. McNair (Democratic) 47.6%

== Mississippi ==
District	Incumbent			This race	
District	Member	Party	First elected	Results	Candidates
Mississippi 1	Lucius Q. C. Lamar	Democratic	1872	Incumbent retired to run for U.S. senator. Democratic hold.	▌ ✓ Henry L. Muldrow (Democratic) 76.24%; ▌James W. Lee (Republican) 23.76%
Mississippi 2	G. Wiley Wells	Republican	1874	Incumbent retired. Democratic gain.	▌ ✓ Van. H. Manning (Democratic) 61.74%; ▌Thomas Watson (Republican) 38.26%
Mississippi 3	Hernando Money	Democratic	1874	Incumbent re-elected.	▌ ✓ Hernando Money (Democratic) 73.96%; ▌W. W. Chisholm (Republican) 26.04%
Mississippi 4	Otho R. Singleton	Democratic	1874	Incumbent re-elected.	▌ ✓ Otho R. Singleton (Democratic) 80.80%; ▌W. M. Hancock (Republican) 19.20%
Mississippi 5	Charles E. Hooker	Democratic	1874	Incumbent re-elected.	▌ ✓ Charles E. Hooker (Democratic) 69.67%; ▌Michael Shaughnessey (Republican) 30.33%
Mississippi 6	John R. Lynch	Republican	1872	Incumbent lost re-election. Democratic gain.	▌ ✓ James R. Chalmers (Democratic) 56.04%; ▌John R. Lynch (Republican) 43.96%

== Missouri ==
District	Incumbent			This race	
District	Member	Party	First elected	Results	Candidates
Missouri 1	Edward C. Kehr	Democratic	1874	Incumbent lost re-election. Republican gain.	▌ ✓ Anthony F. Ittner (Republican) 50.7%; ▌ Edward C. Kehr (Democratic) 49.2%
Missouri 2	Erastus Wells	Democratic	1868	Incumbent lost re-election. Republican gain.	▌ ✓ Nathan Cole (Republican) 41.3%; ▌ Erastus Wells (Democratic) 39.7%; ▌ Alonzo W. Slayback (Independent Democratic) 18.2%
Missouri 3	William Henry Stone	Democratic	1872	Incumbent retired. Republican gain.	▌ ✓ Lyne Metcalfe (Republican) 50.1%; ▌ R. Graham Frost (Democratic) 49.9%
Missouri 4	Robert A. Hatcher	Democratic	1872	Incumbent re-elected.	▌ ✓ Robert A. Hatcher (Democratic) 79.0%; ▌ Lowndes H. Davis (Republican) 14.6%; ▌ W. Ballentine (Independent Republican) 6.4%
Missouri 5	Richard P. Bland	Democratic	1872	Incumbent re-elected.	▌ ✓ Richard P. Bland (Democratic) 56.1%; ▌ J. Q. Thompson (Republican) 43.9%
Missouri 6	Charles H. Morgan	Democratic	1874	Incumbent re-elected.	▌ ✓ Charles H. Morgan (Democratic) 49.9%; ▌ Harrison E. Havens (Republican) 47.9%; ▌ Ira S. Haseltine (Greenback) 2.2%
Missouri 7	John Finis Philips	Democratic	1874	Incumbent lost renomination. Democratic hold.	▌ ✓ Thomas T. Crittenden (Democratic) 54.9%; ▌ John Hubler Stover (Republican) 45.1%
Missouri 8	Benjamin J. Franklin	Democratic	1874	Incumbent re-elected.	▌ ✓ Benjamin J. Franklin (Democratic) 68.0%; ▌ D. G. Mitchell (Republican) 32.0%
Missouri 9	David Rea	Democratic	1874	Incumbent re-elected.	▌ ✓ David Rea (Democratic) 54.1%; ▌ Benjamin F. Loan (Republican) 45.9%
Missouri 10	Rezin A. De Bolt	Democratic	1874	Incumbent lost re-election. Republican gain.	▌ ✓ Henry M. Pollard (Republican) 51.0%; ▌ Rezin A. De Bolt (Democratic) 48.6%
Missouri 11	John B. Clark Jr.	Democratic	1872	Incumbent re-elected.	▌ ✓ John B. Clark Jr. (Democratic) 68.6%; ▌ Mark L. De Motte (Republican) 31.4%
Missouri 12	John M. Glover	Democratic	1872	Incumbent re-elected.	▌ ✓ John M. Glover (Democratic) 57.1%; ▌ J. K. Woodward (Republican) 41.1%; ▌ John M. Loudon (Greenback) 1.8%
Missouri 13	Aylett H. Buckner	Democratic	1872	Incumbent re-elected.	▌ ✓ Aylett H. Buckner (Democratic) 79.2%; ▌ T. B. Robinson (Republican) 17.3%; ▌ S. Carkner (Greenback) 3.5%

== Nebraska ==
District	Incumbent			This race	
District	Member	Party	First elected	Results	Candidates
Nebraska at-large	Lorenzo Crounse	Republican	1872	Incumbent retired. Republican hold.	▌ ✓ Frank Welch (Republican) 59.79%; ▌Joseph Hollman (Democratic) 33.29%; ▌Marvin Warren (Greenback) 6.93%

== Nevada ==
District	Incumbent			This race	
District	Member	Party	First elected	Results	Candidates
Nevada at-large	William Woodburn	Republican	1874	Incumbent retired. Republican hold.	▌ ✓ Thomas Wren (Republican) 52.3%; ▌A. C. Ellis (Democratic) 47.7%

== New Hampshire ==
District	Incumbent			This race	
District	Member	Party	First elected	Results	Candidates
New Hampshire 1	Frank Jones	Democratic	1875	Incumbent re-elected.	▌ ✓ Frank Jones (Democratic) 49.8%; ▌ Gilman Marston (Republican) 49.7%
New Hampshire 2	Samuel Newell Bell	Democratic	1875	Incumbent retired. Republican gain.	▌ ✓ James F. Briggs (Republican) 52.0%; ▌ A. W. Sulloway (Democratic) 47.7%
New Hampshire 3	Henry W. Blair	Republican	1875	Incumbent re-elected.	▌ ✓ Henry W. Blair (Republican) 51.6%; ▌ Henry O. Kent (Democratic) 48.1%

== New Jersey ==
District	Incumbent			This race	
District	Member	Party	First elected	Results	Candidates
New Jersey 1	Clement H. Sinnickson	Republican	1874	Incumbent re-elected.	▌ ✓ Clement H. Sinnickson (Republican) 52.9%; ▌ [FNU] Simmerman (Democratic) 47.1%
New Jersey 2	Samuel A. Dobbins	Republican	1872	Incumbent retired. Republican hold.	▌ ✓ John H. Pugh (Republican) 50.8%; ▌ Hezekiah B. Smith (Democratic) 49.2%
New Jersey 3	Miles Ross	Democratic	1874	Incumbent re-elected.	▌ ✓ Miles Ross (Democratic) 54.7%; ▌ George W. Atherton (Republican) 45.3%
New Jersey 4	Robert Hamilton	Democratic	1872	Incumbent retired. Democratic hold.	▌ ✓ Alvah A. Clark (Democratic) 59.3%; ▌ Rynier H. Veghte (Independent Democratic) 40.7%
New Jersey 5	Augustus W. Cutler	Democratic	1874	Incumbent re-elected.	▌ ✓ Augustus W. Cutler (Democratic) 53.9%; ▌ Alfred Mills (Republican) 46.2%
New Jersey 6	Frederick H. Teese	Democratic	1874	Incumbent retired. Republican gain.	▌ ✓ Thomas B. Peddie (Republican) 51.5%; ▌ William A. Righter (Democratic) 47.0%; ▌ William Baxter (Greenback) 1.5%
New Jersey 7	Augustus A. Hardenbergh	Democratic	1874	Incumbent re-elected.	▌ ✓ Augustus A. Hardenbergh (Democratic) 60.2%; ▌ Leonard J. Stiastny (Republican) 39.8%

== New York ==
District	Incumbent			This race	
District	Member	Party	First elected	Results	Candidates
New York 1	Henry B. Metcalfe	Democratic	1874	Incumbent retired. Democratic hold.	▌ ✓ James W. Covert (Democratic) 56.7%; ▌ John A. King (Republican) 42.8%
New York 2	John G. Schumaker	Democratic	1872	Incumbent retired. Democratic hold.	▌ ✓ William D. Veeder (Democratic) 60.2%; ▌ James Cavanagh (Republican) 37.2%; ▌ John G. Bolen (American Reform) 2.6%
New York 3	Simeon B. Chittenden	Independent Republican	1874	Incumbent re-elected as a Republican candidate. Republican gain.	▌ ✓ Simeon B. Chittenden (Republican) 50.2%; ▌ Thomas S. Dakin (Democratic) 49.5%
New York 4	Archibald M. Bliss	Democratic	1874	Incumbent re-elected.	▌ ✓ Archibald M. Bliss (Democratic) 61.5%; ▌ Solomon Spitzer (Republican) 38.2%
New York 5	Edwin R. Meade	Democratic	1874	Incumbent retired. Democratic hold.	▌ ✓ Nicholas Muller (Tammany Hall Democratic) 75.2%; ▌ James Kerrigan (Independent Republican) 23.4%; ▌ Michael C. Murphy (Anti-Tammany Democratic) 1.4%
New York 6	Samuel S. Cox	Democratic	1873	Incumbent re-elected.	▌ ✓ Samuel S. Cox (Democratic) 95.0%
New York 7	Smith Ely Jr.	Democratic	1874	Incumbent resigned to become Mayor of New York City. Democratic hold.	▌ ✓ Anthony Eickhoff (Democratic) 68.1%; ▌ Wallace P. Groom (Republican/Greenback) 31.2%
New York 8	Elijah Ward	Democratic	1874	Incumbent lost re-election. Republican gain.	▌ ✓ Anson G. McCook (Republican) 51.3%; ▌ Elijah Ward (Democratic) 48.1%
New York 9	Fernando Wood	Democratic	1866	Incumbent re-elected.	▌ ✓ Fernando Wood (Democratic) 62.1%; ▌ George W. DeCunha (Republican) 35.8%
New York 10	Abram Hewitt	Democratic	1874	Incumbent re-elected.	▌ ✓ Abram Hewitt (Democratic) 69.6%; ▌ Hamilton Babcock (Republican) 27.6%
New York 11	Benjamin A. Willis	Democratic	1874	Incumbent re-elected.	▌ ✓ Benjamin A. Willis (Democratic) 49.7%; ▌ Levi P. Morton (Republican) 48.0%
New York 12	Nathaniel H. Odell	Democratic	1874	Incumbent retired. Democratic hold.	▌ ✓ Clarkson Nott Potter (Democratic) 59.0%; ▌ George A. Brandreth (Republican) 41.0%
New York 13	John O. Whitehouse	Democratic	1872	Incumbent retired. Republican gain.	▌ ✓ John H. Ketcham (Republican) 52.7%; ▌ J. Mansfield Davies (Democratic) 46.6%
New York 14	George M. Beebe	Democratic	1874	Incumbent re-elected.	▌ ✓ George M. Beebe (Democratic) 54.7%; ▌ Halstead Sweet (Republican) 45.3%
New York 15	John H. Bagley Jr.	Democratic	1874	Incumbent retired. Democratic hold.	▌ ✓ Stephen L. Mayham (Democratic) 55.7%; ▌ Thomas H. Tremper (Republican) 44.2%
New York 16	Charles H. Adams	Republican	1874	Incumbent lost renomination. Democratic gain.	▌ ✓ Terence J. Quinn (Democratic) 51.3%; ▌ Hamilton Harris (Republican) 48.7%
New York 17	Martin I. Townsend	Republican	1874	Incumbent re-elected.	▌ ✓ Martin I. Townsend (Republican) 53.0%; ▌ Roswell A. Parmenter (Democratic) 47.0%
New York 18	Andrew Williams	Republican	1874	Incumbent re-elected.	▌ ✓ Andrew Williams (Republican) 56.3%; ▌ Zephaniah C. Platt (Democratic) 43.7%
New York 19	William A. Wheeler	Republican	1868	Incumbent retired upon election as Vice President of the United States. Republican hold.	▌ ✓ Amaziah B. James (Republican) 66.4%; ▌ Daniel Magone, Jr. (Democratic) 33.6%
New York 20	Henry H. Hathorn	Republican	1872	Incumbent retired. Republican hold.	▌ ✓ John H. Starin (Republican) 51.4%; ▌ Nicholas H. Decker (Democratic) 48.6%
New York 21	Samuel F. Miller	Republican	1874	Incumbent retired. Republican hold.	▌ ✓ Solomon Bundy (Republican) 52.5%; ▌ Tompkins A. Matteson (Democratic) 47.5%
New York 22	George A. Bagley	Republican	1874	Incumbent re-elected.	▌ ✓ George A. Bagley (Republican) 53.6%; ▌ George W. Smith (Democratic) 45.9%
New York 23	Scott Lord	Democratic	1874	Incumbent lost re-election. Republican gain.	▌ ✓ William J. Bacon (Republican) 51.3%; ▌ Scott Lord (Democratic) 48.7%
New York 24	William H. Baker	Republican	1874	Incumbent re-elected.	▌ ✓ William H. Baker (Republican) 57.3%; ▌ Orzo M. Bond (Democratic) 40.8%; ▌ Charles T. Richardson (Independent Democratic) 1.9%
New York 25	Elias W. Leavenworth	Republican	1874	Incumbent retired. Republican hold.	▌ ✓ Frank Hiscock (Republican) 57.1%; ▌ Daniel Pratt (Democratic) 42.9%
New York 26	Clinton D. MacDougall	Republican	1872	Incumbent lost renomination. Republican hold.	▌ ✓ John H. Camp (Republican) 56.1%; ▌ Peter H. Van Auken (Democratic) 43.9%
New York 27	Elbridge G. Lapham	Republican	1874	Incumbent re-elected.	▌ ✓ Elbridge G. Lapham (Republican) 55.3%; ▌ Harlow L. Comstock (Democratic) 44.5%
New York 28	Thomas C. Platt	Republican	1872	Incumbent retired. Republican hold.	▌ ✓ Jeremiah W. Dwight (Republican) 54.3%; ▌ Edward F. Jones (Democratic) 45.1%
New York 29	Charles C. B. Walker	Democratic	1874	Incumbent retired. Republican gain.	▌ ✓ John N. Hungerford (Republican) 54.0%; ▌ Edwin D. Loveridge (Democratic) 46.0%
New York 30	John M. Davy	Republican	1874	Incumbent lost re-election. Democratic gain.	▌ ✓ Elizur K. Hart (Democratic) 50.7%; ▌ John M. Davy (Republican) 48.8%
New York 31	George Gilbert Hoskins	Republican	1872	Incumbent lost re-election. Democratic gain.	▌ ✓ Charles B. Benedict (Democratic) 42.3%; ▌ George Gilbert Hoskins (Republican) 41.0%; ▌ Thomas T. Flagler (Independent Republican) 16.7%
New York 32	Lyman K. Bass	Republican	1872	Incumbent retired. Democratic gain.	▌ ✓ Daniel N. Lockwood (Democratic) 50.5%; ▌ Elbridge G. Spaulding (Republican) 49.4%
New York 33	Nelson I. Norton	Republican	1875	Incumbent retired. Republican hold.	▌ ✓ George W. Patterson (Republican) 61.3%; ▌ James Freland (Democratic) 38.4%

== North Carolina ==
District	Incumbent			This race	
District	Member	Party	First elected	Results	Candidates
North Carolina 1	Jesse Johnson Yeates	Democratic	1874	Incumbent re-elected.	▌ ✓ Jesse Johnson Yeates (Democratic) 51.7%; ▌ D. McDonald Lindsey (Republican) 48.3%
North Carolina 2	John Adams Hyman	Republican	1874	Incumbent lost renomination. Republican hold.	▌ ✓ Curtis Hooks Brogden (Republican) 64.0%; ▌ Wharton J. Green (Democratic) 36.1%
North Carolina 3	Alfred Moore Waddell	Democratic	1870	Incumbent re-elected.	▌ ✓ Alfred Moore Waddell (Democratic) 52.5%; ▌ William P. Canaday (Republican) 47.5%
North Carolina 4	Joseph J. Davis	Democratic	1874	Incumbent re-elected.	▌ ✓ Joseph J. Davis (Democratic) 52.5%; ▌ Isaac J. Young (Republican) 47.5%
North Carolina 5	Alfred Moore Scales	Democratic	1874	Incumbent re-elected.	▌ ✓ Alfred Moore Scales (Democratic) 54.7%; ▌ James Edmund Boyd (Republican) 45.3%
North Carolina 6	Thomas Samuel Ashe	Democratic	1872	Incumbent retired. Democratic hold.	▌ ✓ Walter Leak Steele (Democratic) 62.7%; ▌ Allen Jordan (Republican) 37.3%
North Carolina 7	William M. Robbins	Democratic	1872	Incumbent re-elected.	▌ ✓ William M. Robbins (Democratic) 59.2%; ▌ Thomas J. Dula (Republican) 40.8%
North Carolina 8	Robert B. Vance	Democratic	1872	Incumbent re-elected.	▌ ✓ Robert B. Vance (Democratic) 67.9%; ▌ Erastus P. Hampton (Republican) 32.1%

== Ohio ==
District	Incumbent			This race	
District	Member	Party	First elected	Results	Candidates
Ohio 1	Milton Sayler	Democratic	1872	Incumbent re-elected.	▌ ✓ Milton Sayler (Democratic) 51.2%; ▌ Manning Ferguson Force (Republican) 48.8%
Ohio 2	Henry B. Banning	Democratic	1872	Incumbent re-elected.	▌ ✓ Henry B. Banning (Democratic) 50.1%; ▌ Stanley Matthews (Republican) 49.9%
Ohio 3	John S. Savage	Democratic	1874	Incumbent lost re-election. Republican gain.	▌ ✓ Mills Gardner (Republican) 50.8%; ▌ John S. Savage (Democratic) 49.2%
Ohio 4	John A. McMahon	Democratic	1874	Incumbent re-elected.	▌ ✓ John A. McMahon (Democratic) 50.0%; ▌ John Howard (Republican) 49.7%; ▌ John H. Blackford (Prohibition) 0.3%
Ohio 5	Americus V. Rice	Democratic	1874	Incumbent re-elected.	▌ ✓ Americus V. Rice (Democratic) 62.0%; ▌ J. L. H. Long (Republican) 38.0%
Ohio 6	Frank H. Hurd	Democratic	1874	Incumbent lost re-election. Republican gain.	▌ ✓ Jacob D. Cox (Republican) 50.0%; ▌ Frank H. Hurd (Democratic) 44.5%; ▌ E. B. Hall (Prohibition) 5.5%
Ohio 7	Lawrence T. Neal	Democratic	1872	Incumbent lost renomination. Democratic hold.	▌ ✓ Henry L. Dickey (Democratic) 52.3%; ▌ A. L. Brown (Republican) 47.6%; ▌ Henry Rhoades (Prohibition) 0.2%
Ohio 8	William Lawrence	Republican	1872	Incumbent retired. Republican hold.	▌ ✓ J. Warren Keifer (Republican) 55.5%; ▌ George Arthur (Democratic) 43.9%; ▌ William Pollard (Prohibition) 0.6%
Ohio 9	Earley F. Poppleton	Democratic	1874	Incumbent lost re-election. Republican gain.	▌ ✓ John S. Jones (Republican) 50.7%; ▌ Earley F. Poppleton (Democratic) 48.2%; ▌ Levi L. Benson (Prohibition) 1.1%
Ohio 10	Charles Foster	Republican	1870	Incumbent re-elected.	▌ ✓ Charles Foster (Republican) 50.3%; ▌ John H. Hudson (Democratic) 49.5%, ▌ Henry S. Canfield (Prohibition) 0.2%
Ohio 11	John L. Vance	Democratic	1874	Incumbent lost re-election. Republican gain.	▌ ✓ Henry S. Neal (Republican) 50.9%; ▌ John L. Vance (Democratic) 49.0%; ▌ David Bennett (Prohibition) 0.1%
Ohio 12	Ansel T. Walling	Democratic	1874	Incumbent lost renomination. Democratic hold.	▌ ✓ Thomas Ewing Jr. (Democratic) 57.2%; ▌ George K. Nash (Republican) 42.4%; ▌ John Robertson (Prohibition) 0.4%
Ohio 13	Milton I. Southard	Democratic	1872	Incumbent re-elected.	▌ ✓ Milton I. Southard (Democratic) 54.7%; ▌ John H. Barnhill (Republican) 45.2%; ▌ Alexander Mason (Prohibition) 0.1%
Ohio 14	Jacob Pitzer Cowan	Democratic	1874	Incumbent lost renomination. Democratic hold.	▌ ✓ Ebenezer B. Finley (Democratic) 60.0%; ▌ Peter S. Grosscut (Republican) 39.9%; ▌ Martin Deal (Prohibition) 0.2%
Ohio 15	Nelson H. Van Vorhes	Republican	1874	Incumbent re-elected.	▌ ✓ Nelson H. Van Vorhes (Republican) 50.5%; ▌ William W. Poston (Democratic) 48.8%; ▌ Flavius J. Cathers (Prohibition) 0.7%
Ohio 16	Lorenzo Danford	Republican	1872	Incumbent re-elected.	▌ ✓ Lorenzo Danford (Republican) 53.7%; ▌ William Lawrence (Democratic) 46.2%; ▌ Charles Jenkins (Prohibition) 0.1%
Ohio 17	Laurin D. Woodworth	Republican	1872	Incumbent lost renomination. Republican hold.	▌ ✓ William McKinley (Republican) 50.2%; ▌ Levi L. Lamborn (Democratic) 40.2%; ▌ John B. Powell (Greenback) 7.5%; ▌ Albert R. Silver (Prohibition) 0.2%
Ohio 18	James Monroe	Republican	1870	Incumbent re-elected.	▌ ✓ James Monroe (Republican) 56.9%; ▌ John J. Hall (Democratic) 43.0%; ▌ S. H. McCollister (Prohibition) 0.2%
Ohio 19	James A. Garfield	Republican	1862	Incumbent re-elected.	▌ ✓ James A. Garfield (Republican) 63.8%; ▌ John S. Casement (Democratic) 36.2%; ▌ R. S. Stranahant (Prohibition) 0.1%
Ohio 20	Henry B. Payne	Democratic	1874	Incumbent lost re-election. Republican gain.	▌ ✓ Amos Townsend (Republican) 55.0%; ▌ Henry B. Payne (Democratic) 44.6%; ▌ William H. Doan (Prohibition) 0.5%

== Oregon ==
District	Incumbent			This race	
District	Member	Party	First elected	Results	Candidates
Oregon at-large	Lafayette Lane	Democratic	1875	Incumbent lost re-election. Republican gain.	▌ ✓ Richard Williams (Republican) 51.9%; ▌ Lafayette Lane (Democratic) 48.1%

== Pennsylvania ==
District	Incumbent			This race	
District	Member	Party	First elected	Results	Candidates
Pennsylvania 1	Chapman Freeman	Republican	1874	Incumbent re-elected.	▌ ✓ Chapman Freeman (Republican) 57.2%; ▌ John S. Thackray (Democratic) 42.8%
Pennsylvania 2	Charles O'Neill	Republican	1872	Incumbent re-elected.	▌ ✓ Charles O'Neill (Republican) 56.1%; ▌ Charles H. Gibson (Democratic) 43.9%
Pennsylvania 3	Samuel J. Randall	Democratic	1862	Incumbent re-elected.	▌ ✓ Samuel J. Randall (Democratic) 56.3%; ▌ Benjamin L. Berry (Republican) 43.7%
Pennsylvania 4	William D. Kelley	Republican	1860	Incumbent re-elected.	▌ ✓ William D. Kelley (Republican) 60.2%; ▌ John T. School (Democratic) 39.8%
Pennsylvania 5	John Robbins	Democratic	1874	Incumbent retired. Republican gain.	▌ ✓ Alfred C. Harmer (Republican) 55.0%; ▌ Jacob Duvall (Democratic) 45.0%
Pennsylvania 6	Washington Townsend	Republican	1868	Incumbent retired. Republican hold.	▌ ✓ William Ward (Republican) 61.0%; ▌ William D. Hartman (Democratic) 39.0%
Pennsylvania 7	Alan Wood Jr.	Republican	1874	Incumbent retired. Republican hold.	▌ ✓ Isaac Newton Evans (Republican) 52.5%; ▌ Abel Rambo (Democratic) 47.5%
Pennsylvania 8	Hiester Clymer	Democratic	1872	Incumbent re-elected.	▌ ✓ Hiester Clymer (Democratic) 65.6%; ▌ Henry D. Markley (Republican) 26.7%; ▌ C. Shearer (Greenback) 7.7%
Pennsylvania 9	A. Herr Smith	Republican	1872	Incumbent re-elected.	▌ ✓ A. Herr Smith (Republican) 64.5%; ▌ George Nauman (Democratic) 35.5%
Pennsylvania 10	William Mutchler	Democratic	1874	Incumbent retired. Democratic hold.	▌ ✓ Samuel A. Bridges (Democratic) 62.1%; ▌ Howard J. Reeder (Republican) 37.9%
Pennsylvania 11	Francis D. Collins	Democratic	1874	Incumbent re-elected.	▌ ✓ Francis D. Collins (Democratic) 64.6%; ▌ David Jewett Waller Sr. (Republican) 35.4%
Pennsylvania 12	Winthrop Welles Ketcham	Republican	1874	Incumbent resigned to become U.S. District Judge. Democratic gain.	▌ ✓ Hendrick B. Wright (Democratic) 52.7%; ▌ H. B. Payne (Republican) 47.0%; ▌ W. W. Winton (Prohibition) 0.3%
Pennsylvania 13	James B. Reilly	Democratic	1874	Incumbent re-elected.	▌ ✓ James B. Reilly (Democratic) 50.2%; ▌ J. S. Nutting (Republican) 49.8%
Pennsylvania 14	John B. Packer	Republican	1868	Incumbent retired. Republican hold.	▌ ✓ John W. Killinger (Republican) 53.6%; ▌ William B. Wilson (Democratic) 44.7%; ▌ H. C. Deming (Greenback) 1.7%
Pennsylvania 15	Joseph Powell	Democratic	1874	Incumbent lost re-election. Republican gain.	▌ ✓ Edward Overton Jr. (Republican) 53.1%; ▌ Joseph Powell (Democratic) 46.9%
Pennsylvania 16	Sobieski Ross	Republican	1872	Incumbent retired. Republican hold.	▌ ✓ John I. Mitchell (Republican) 50.3%; ▌ Henry White (Democratic) 44.8%; ▌ John F. Davis (Greenback) 4.9%
Pennsylvania 17	John Reilly	Democratic	1874	Incumbent lost re-election. Republican gain.	▌ ✓ Jacob M. Campbell (Republican) 50.9%; ▌ John Reilly (Democratic) 49.1%
Pennsylvania 18	William Stenger	Democratic	1874	Incumbent re-elected.	▌ ✓ William Stenger (Democratic) 50.1%; ▌ Thaddeus M. Mahon (Republican) 49.9%
Pennsylvania 19	Levi Maish	Democratic	1874	Incumbent re-elected.	▌ ✓ Levi Maish (Democratic) 57.7%; ▌ C. H. Bressler (Republican) 42.3%
Pennsylvania 20	Levi A. Mackey	Democratic	1874	Incumbent re-elected.	▌ ✓ Levi A. Mackey (Democratic) 59.2%; ▌ J. S. Lincoln (Republican) 40.8%
Pennsylvania 21	Jacob Turney	Democratic	1874	Incumbent re-elected.	▌ ✓ Jacob Turney (Democratic) 57.1%; ▌ Jacob Rush (Republican) 42.9%
Pennsylvania 22	James Herron Hopkins	Democratic	1874	Incumbent lost re-election. Republican gain.	▌ ✓ Russell Errett (Republican) 53.0%; ▌ James Herron Hopkins (Democratic) 47.0%
Pennsylvania 23	Alexander G. Cochran	Democratic	1874	Incumbent lost re-election. Republican gain.	▌ ✓ Thomas M. Bayne (Republican) 59.6%; ▌ Alexander G. Cochran (Democratic) 39.7%; ▌ Thomas H. Rabe (Prohibition) 0.7%
Pennsylvania 24	John Winfield Wallace	Republican	1874	Incumbent retired. Republican hold.	▌ ✓ William S. Shallenberger (Republican) 55.0%; ▌ Robert B. McComb (Democratic) 44.5%; ▌ J. D. Glenn (Prohibition) 0.5%
Pennsylvania 25	George A. Jenks	Democratic	1874	Incumbent lost re-election. Republican gain.	▌ ✓ Harry White (Republican) 53.1%; ▌ George A. Jenks (Democratic) 46.9%
Pennsylvania 26	James Sheakley	Democratic	1874	Incumbent lost re-election. Republican gain.	▌ ✓ John McCandless Thompson (Republican) 52.7%; ▌ James Sheakley (Democratic) 46.9%; ▌ A. S. Thorne (Prohibition) 0.4%
Pennsylvania 27	Albert Gallatin Egbert	Democratic	1874	Incumbent retired. Republican gain.	▌ ✓ Lewis F. Watson (Republican) 55.9%; ▌ William Lawrence Scott (Democratic) 43.2%; ▌ Samuel Axtell (Prohibition) 0.9%

== Rhode Island ==
District	Incumbent			This race	
District	Member	Party	First elected	Results	Candidates
Rhode Island 1	Benjamin T. Eames	Republican	1870	Incumbent re-elected.	▌ ✓ Benjamin T. Eames (Republican) 74.5%; ▌ Edward W. Brunson (Democratic) 37.2%; ▌ [FNU] Chace (Greenback) 0.3%
Rhode Island 2	Latimer W. Ballou	Republican	1874	Incumbent re-elected.	▌ ✓ Latimer W. Ballou (Republican) 57.3%; ▌ Charles H. Page (Democratic) 42.3%; ▌ John M. Bailey (Greenback) 0.4%

== South Carolina ==
District	Incumbent			This race	
District	Member	Party	First elected	Results	Candidates
South Carolina 1	Joseph Rainey	Republican	1870 (special)	Incumbent re-elected.	▌ ✓ Joseph Rainey (Republican) 52.2%; ▌John S. Richardson (Democratic) 47.8%
South Carolina 2	Edmund W. M. Mackey	Independent; Republican	1874	Seat declared vacant July 19, 1876, due to contested election. Republican gain.	▌ ✓ Richard H. Cain (Republican) 62.1%; ▌Michael P. O'Connor (Democratic) 37.9%
South Carolina 3	Solomon L. Hoge	Republican	1874	Incumbent retired. Democratic gain.	▌ ✓ D. Wyatt Aiken (Democratic) 58.0%; ▌Lewis C. Carpenter (Republican) 42.0%
South Carolina 4	Alexander S. Wallace	Republican	1868	Incumbent lost re-election. Democratic gain.	▌ ✓ John H. Evins (Democratic) 57.6%; ▌Alexander S. Wallace (Republican) 42.4%
South Carolina 5	Robert Smalls	Republican	1874	Incumbent re-elected.	▌ ✓ Robert Smalls (Republican) 51.9%; ▌George D. Tillman (Democratic) 48.1%

== Tennessee ==
District	Incumbent			This race	
District	Member	Party	First elected	Results	Candidates
Tennessee 1	William McFarland	Democratic	1874	Incumbent lost re-election. Republican gain.	▌ ✓ James H. Randolph (Republican) 52.41%; ▌William McFarland (Democratic) 47.59%
Tennessee 2	Jacob M. Thornburgh	Republican	1872	Incumbent re-elected.	▌ ✓ Jacob M. Thornburgh (Republican) 59.87%; ▌William Cullom (Democratic) 40.13%
Tennessee 3	George G. Dibrell	Democratic	1874	Incumbent re-elected.	▌ ✓ George G. Dibrell (Democratic) 61.51%; ▌G. M. Drake (Republican) 38.49%
Tennessee 4	Haywood Y. Riddle	Democratic	1875 (special)	Incumbent re-elected.	▌ ✓ Haywood Y. Riddle (Democratic) 70.59%; ▌R. A. Cox (Democratic) 20.93%; ▌R. F. Patton (Republican) 8.48%
Tennessee 5	John M. Bright	Democratic	1870	Incumbent re-elected.	▌ ✓ John M. Bright (Democratic) 73.98%; ▌Robert Galbraith (Republican) 26.02%
Tennessee 6	John F. House	Democratic	1874	Incumbent re-elected.	▌ ✓ John F. House (Democratic) 63.62%; ▌William F. Prosser (Republican) 36.38%
Tennessee 7	Washington C. Whitthorne	Democratic	1870	Incumbent re-elected.	▌ ✓ Washington C. Whitthorne (Democratic) 68.57%; ▌D. B. Cliff (Republican) 21.11%; ▌G. W. Blackburn (Independent Republican) 10.32%
Tennessee 8	John D. C. Atkins	Democratic	1872	Incumbent re-elected.	▌ ✓ John D. C. Atkins (Democratic) 61.78%; ▌Samuel W. Hawkins (Republican) 38.22%
Tennessee 9	William P. Caldwell	Democratic	1874	Incumbent re-elected.	▌ ✓ William P. Caldwell (Democratic) 69.45%; ▌H. B. Folk (Republican) 30.55%

== Texas ==
District	Incumbent			This race	
District	Member	Party	First elected	Results	Candidates
Texas 1	John H. Reagan	Democratic	1874	Incumbent re-elected.	▌ ✓ John H. Reagan (Democratic) 67.0%; ▌ Leroy W. Cooper (Republican) 32.8%
Texas 2	David B. Culberson	Democratic	1874	Incumbent re-elected.	▌ ✓ David B. Culberson (Democratic) 65.5%; ▌ Stillwell H. Russell (Republican) 34.5%
Texas 3	James W. Throckmorton	Democratic	1874	Incumbent re-elected.	▌ ✓ James W. Throckmorton (Democratic) 91.4%; ▌ J. C. Bigger (Republican) 8.6%
Texas 4	Roger Q. Mills	Democratic	1872	Incumbent re-elected.	▌ ✓ Roger Q. Mills (Democratic) 73.2%; ▌ John Patterson Osterhout (Republican) 26.7%
Texas 5	John Hancock	Democratic	1870	Incumbent retired. Democratic hold.	▌ ✓ D. C. Giddings (Democratic) 54.3%; ▌ George Washington Jones (Independent) 45.4%
Texas 6	Gustav Schleicher	Democratic	1874	Incumbent re-elected.	▌ ✓ Gustav Schleicher (Democratic) 81.2%; ▌ James Pearson Newcomb (Republican) 17.9%

== Vermont ==
District	Incumbent			This race	
District	Member	Party	First elected	Results	Candidates
Vermont 1	Charles H. Joyce	Republican	1874	Incumbent re-elected.	▌ ✓ Charles H. Joyce (Republican) 67.2%; ▌Asa Child (Democratic) 32.7%
Vermont 2	Dudley C. Denison	Independent; Republican	1874	Incumbent re-elected as a Republican. Republican gain.	▌ ✓ Dudley C. Denison (Republican) 71.2%; ▌Asa M. Dickey (Democratic) 28.3%; ▌Luke P. Poland (Republican) 0.4%
Vermont 3	George Hendee	Republican	1872	Incumbent re-elected.	▌ ✓ George Hendee (Republican) 68.5%; ▌John Edwards (Democratic) 30.7%; ▌Asahel Peck (Republican) 0.7%

== Virginia ==
District	Incumbent			This race	
District	Member	Party	First elected	Results	Candidates
Virginia 1	Beverly B. Douglas	Democratic	1874	Incumbent re-elected.	▌ ✓ Beverly B. Douglas (Democratic) 56.5%; ▌L. C. Boiston (Republican) 43.5%
Virginia 2	John Goode	Democratic	1874	Incumbent re-elected.	▌ ✓ John Goode (Democratic) 53.0%; ▌Joseph Secar (Republican) 47.0%
Virginia 3	Gilbert C. Walker	Democratic	1874	Incumbent re-elected.	▌ ✓ Gilbert C. Walker (Democratic) 55.3%; ▌Charles S. Mills (Republican) 44.5%
Virginia 4	William H. H. Stowell	Republican	1870	Incumbent retired. Republican hold.	▌ ✓ Joseph Jorgensen (Republican) 51.9%; ▌William E. Hunton (Democratic) 46.7%; ▌M. De R. Mortie (Republican) 1.4%
Virginia 5	George Cabell	Democratic	1874	Incumbent re-elected.	▌ ✓ George Cabell (Democratic) 60.6%; ▌Daniel S. Lewis (Republican) 39.4%
Virginia 6	J. Randolph Tucker	Democratic	1874	Incumbent re-elected.	▌ ✓ J. Randolph Tucker (Democratic) 59.6%; ▌George H. Burch (Republican) 40.4%
Virginia 7	John T. Harris	Democratic	1870	Incumbent re-elected.	▌ ✓ John T. Harris (Democratic) 73.3%; ▌Everett W. Early (Republican) 26.7%
Virginia 8	Eppa Hunton	Democratic	1872	Incumbent re-elected.	▌ ✓ Eppa Hunton (Democratic) 62.1%; ▌I. C. O'Neal (Republican) 37.9%
Virginia 9	William Terry	Democratic	1874	Incumbent lost renomination. Democratic hold.	▌ ✓ Auburn Pridemore (Democratic) 75.8%; ▌George T. Egbert (Republican) 24.0%; ▌Fayette McMullen (Independent) 0.2%

== West Virginia ==
District	Incumbent			This race	
District	Member	Party	First elected	Results	Candidates
West Virginia 1	Benjamin Wilson	Democratic	1874	Incumbent re-elected.	▌ ✓ Benjamin Wilson (Democratic) 52.70%; ▌G. F. Scott (Republican) 47.30%
West Virginia 2	Charles J. Faulkner	Democratic	1874	Incumbent retired to run for U.S. senator. Democratic hold.	▌ ✓ Benjamin F. Martin (Democratic) 55.97%; ▌Ward H. Lamon (Republican) 44.03%
West Virginia 3	Frank Hereford	Democratic	1870	Incumbent retired to run for U.S. senator. Democratic hold.	▌ ✓ John E. Kenna (Democratic) 61.47%; ▌Benjamin J. Redmund (Republican) 38.53%

== Wisconsin ==
Wisconsin elected eight members of congress on Election Day, November 7, 1876.

District	Incumbent			This race	
District	Member	Party	First elected	Results	Candidates
Wisconsin 1	Charles G. Williams	Republican	1872	Incumbent re-elected.	▌ ✓ Charles G. Williams (Republican) 59.3%; ▌H. G. Winslow (Democratic) 40.7%
Wisconsin 2	Lucien B. Caswell	Republican	1874	Incumbent re-elected.	▌ ✓ Lucien B. Caswell (Republican) 50.6%; ▌Harlow S. Orton (Democratic) 49.4%
Wisconsin 3	Henry S. Magoon	Republican	1870	Incumbent lost renomination. Republican hold.	▌ ✓ George Cochrane Hazelton (Republican) 54.5%; ▌Philo A. Orton Jr. (Democratic) 45.5%
Wisconsin 4	William Pitt Lynde	Democratic	1874	Incumbent re-elected.	▌ ✓ William Pitt Lynde (Democratic) 59.6%; ▌William E. Smith (Republican) 40.4%
Wisconsin 5	Samuel D. Burchard	Democratic	1874	Incumbent lost renomination. Democratic hold.	▌ ✓ Edward S. Bragg (Democratic) 58.2%; ▌George W. Carter (Republican) 41.8%
Wisconsin 6	Alanson M. Kimball	Republican	1874	Incumbent lost re-election. Democratic gain.	▌ ✓ Gabriel Bouck (Democratic) 53.6%; ▌Alanson M. Kimball (Republican) 46.4%
Wisconsin 7	Jeremiah McLain Rusk	Republican	1870	Incumbent lost renomination. Republican hold.	▌ ✓ Herman L. Humphrey (Republican) 58.6%; ▌Martin R. Gage (Democratic) 37.4%; ▌Reuben May (Ind. Greenback) 4.0%
Wisconsin 8	George W. Cate	Democratic	1874	Incumbent lost re-election. Republican gain.	▌ ✓ Thaddeus C. Pound (Republican) 51.7%; ▌George W. Cate (Democratic) 48.3%

== Non-voting delegates ==
District	Incumbent			This race	
District	Delegate	Party	First elected	Results	Candidates
Arizona Territory at-large
Dakota Territory at-large	Jefferson P. Kidder	Republican	1874	Incumbent re-elected.	▌ ✓ Jefferson P. Kidder (Republican); [data missing]
Idaho Territory at-large	Stephen S. Fenn	Democratic	1874	Incumbent re-elected.	▌ ✓ Stephen S. Fenn (Democratic) 53.93%; ▌John Clark (Republican) 46.07%
Montana Territory at-large	Martin Maginnis	Democratic	1872	Incumbent re-elected.	▌ ✓ Martin Maginnis (Democratic) 56.22%; ▌E. D. Leavitt (Republican) 43.78%
New Mexico Territory at-large
Washington Territory at-large
Wyoming Territory at-large	William R. Steele	Democratic	1872	Incumbent lost re-election. Republican gain.	▌ ✓ William W. Corlett (Republican) 58.33%; ▌William R. Steele (Democratic) 41.67%

== See also ==
- 1876 United States elections
  - 1876 United States presidential election
  - 1876–77 United States Senate elections
- 44th United States Congress
- 45th United States Congress

== Bibliography ==
- Dubin, Michael J. (March 1, 1998). United States Congressional Elections, 1788-1997: The Official Results of the Elections of the 1st Through 105th Congresses. McFarland and Company. ISBN 978-0786402830.
- Martis, Kenneth C. (January 1, 1989). The Historical Atlas of Political Parties in the United States Congress, 1789-1989. Macmillan Publishing Company. ISBN 978-0029201701.
- Moore, John L., ed. (1994). Congressional Quarterly's Guide to U.S. Elections (Third ed.). Congressional Quarterly Inc. ISBN 978-0871879967.
- "Party Divisions of the House of Representatives* 1789–Present". Office of the Historian, House of United States House of Representatives.
