= Franklin E. Brooks =

American politician (1860–1916)

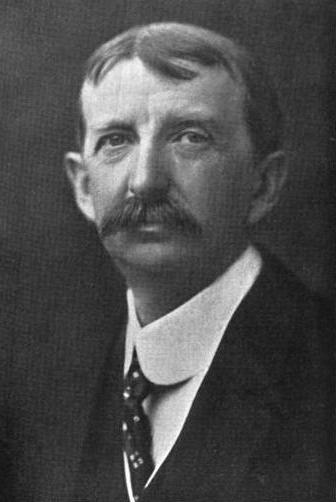
- From 1916's Annual Report of the Colorado Bar Association.

Member of the U.S. House of Representatives from Colorado's at-large district
- In office March 4, 1903 – March 3, 1907
- Preceded by: District inactive
- Succeeded by: George W. Cook

Personal details
- Born: Franklin Eli Brooks; November 19, 1860 Sturbridge, Massachusetts, U.S.
- Died: February 7, 1916 (aged 55) St. Augustine, Florida, U.S.
- Resting place: Evergreen Cemetery; Colorado Springs, Colorado, U.S.
- Party: Republican
- Education: Brown University

Franklin Eli Brooks (November 19, 1860 – February 7, 1916) was a U.S. representative from Colorado.

== Biography ==
Born in Sturbridge, Brooks graduated from Southbridge High School in 1879. He then continued on to Brown University, where he graduated in 1883.

He taught school for several years. He attended the law school of Boston University in 1887 and 1888. He was admitted to the bar in 1888 and commenced practice in Boston, Massachusetts. He moved to Colorado Springs, Colorado, in 1891, where he continued the practice of law. He served as delegate to the Republican State conventions in 1900 and 1907, serving as chairman the latter year.

Brooks was elected as a Republican to the Fifty-eighth and Fifty-ninth Congresses (March 4, 1903 – March 3, 1907). He was not a candidate for renomination in 1906 to the Sixtieth Congress. He resumed the practice of law in Colorado Springs, Colorado, but devoted himself principally to land development, being president of the Costilla Estates Development Company. He was appointed a member of the State board of agriculture and trustee of the State agricultural college, Fort Collins, Colorado, in 1907. He then served as trustee of Brown University. He died February 7, 1916, in St. Augustine, Florida, and was interred in Evergreen Cemetery in Colorado Springs, Colorado.

U.S. House of Representatives
Preceded by District inactive	Member of the U.S. House of Representatives from Colorado's at-large congressional district 1903–1907	Succeeded by George W. Cook
