= Colorado's at-large congressional district =

Former congressional district

Coordinates: 39°00′N 105°30′W

The state of Colorado was represented in the United States House of Representatives by one member of the House, elected at-large from 1876 until 1893 and from 1903 until 1913, and by two members at-large from 1913 until 1915. Since the 1914 elections, all members from Colorado have been elected from congressional districts.

== 1876-1893 ==
Colorado was represented by only one member of the House, elected at-large state-wide, from its admission as a state until 1893.

Member	Party	Years	Cong ress(es)	Electoral history
District created October 3, 1876
James B. Belford (Central City)	Republican	October 3, 1876 – December 13, 1877	44th 45th	Elected in 1876 to finish the term ending March 3, 1877. Lost election contest.
Thomas M. Patterson (Denver)	Democratic	December 13, 1877 – March 3, 1879	45th	Won election contest. Retired.
James B. Belford (Central City)	Republican	March 4, 1879 – March 3, 1885	46th 47th 48th	Elected in 1878. Re-elected in 1880. Re-elected in 1882. Lost renomination.
George G. Symes (Denver)	Republican	March 4, 1885 – March 3, 1889	49th 50th	Elected in 1884. Re-elected in 1886. Retired.
Hosea Townsend (Silver Cliff)	Republican	March 4, 1889 – March 3, 1893	51st 52nd	Elected in 1888. Re-elected in 1890. Redistricted to the 2nd district and lost renomination.
Seat replaced by districted seats on March 4, 1893

Colorado was granted a second seat in the U.S. House of Representatives beginning with the U.S. election of 1892. Colorado created two congressional districts: Colorado's 1st congressional district and Colorado's 2nd congressional district.

== 1903-1915 ==
Colorado was apportioned a third seat in the U.S. House of Representatives beginning with the 1902 elections. Colorado's third member of the House was elected at-large. Colorado was apportioned a fourth seat in beginning with the 1912 elections.

Years	Cong ress(es)	Seat A			Seat B		
Years	Cong ress(es)	Member	Party	Electoral history	Member	Party	Electoral history
March 4, 1903 – March 3, 1907	58th 59th	Franklin Eli Brooks (Colorado Springs)	Republican	Elected in 1902. Re-elected in 1904. Retired.			
March 4, 1907 – March 3, 1909	60th	George W. Cook (Denver)	Republican	Elected in 1906. Retired.			
March 4, 1909 – March 3, 1913	61st 62nd	Edward Thomas Taylor (Glenwood Springs)	Democratic	Elected in 1908. Re-elected in 1910. Re-elected in 1912. Redistricted to the 4th district.			
March 4, 1913 – March 3, 1915	63rd	Edward Thomas Taylor (Glenwood Springs)	Democratic	Elected in 1908. Re-elected in 1910. Re-elected in 1912. Redistricted to the 4th district.	Edward Keating (Pueblo)	Democratic	Elected in 1912. Redistricted to the 3rd district.

Colorado used four congressional districts beginning with the U.S. elections of 1914.

== See also ==
- Colorado Territory's at-large congressional district
- Colorado's congressional delegations
- Colorado's congressional districts
- List of United States representatives from Colorado
