= Edward T. Taylor =

American politician

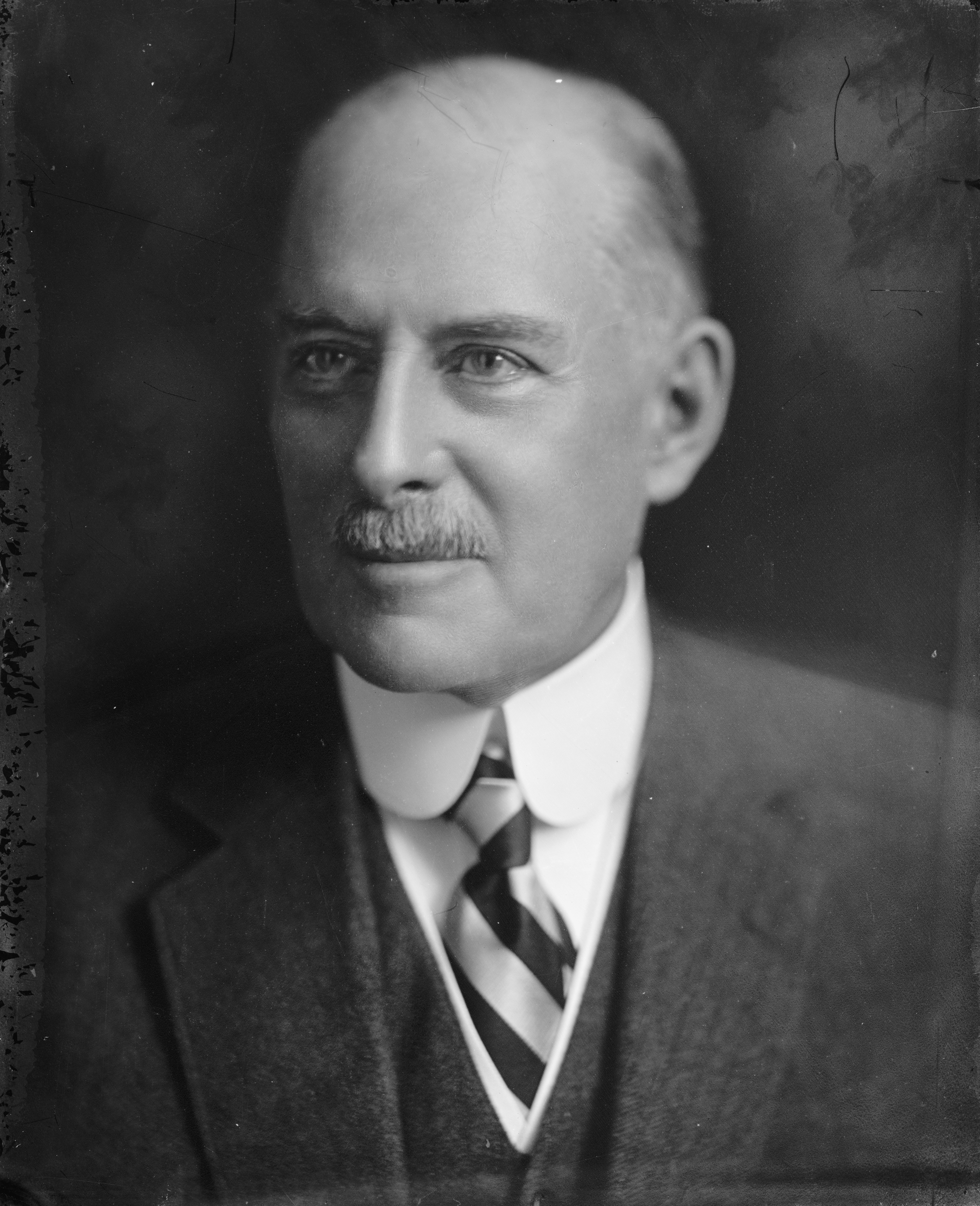

Member of the U.S. House of Representatives from Colorado
- In office March 4, 1909 – September 3, 1941
- Preceded by: George W. Cook
- Succeeded by: Robert F. Rockwell
- Constituency: At-large district (1909–1915); 4th district (1915–1941)

Personal details
- Born: June 19, 1858 near Metamora, Illinois, US
- Died: September 3, 1941 (aged 83) Glenwood Springs, Colorado, US
- Resting place: Rosebud Cemetery, Glenwood Springs, Colorado
- Party: Democratic
- Occupation: Superintendent of Schools; District Attorney; City Attorney; Senator; Congressman
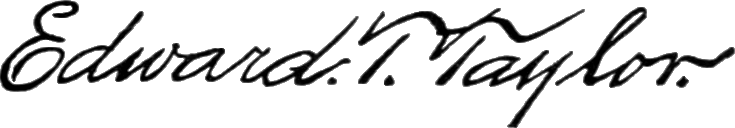
- Signature

Edward Thomas Taylor (June 19, 1858 – September 3, 1941) was an American lawyer and educator who served as a U.S. representative from Colorado. A member of the Democratic Party, he served 17 terms in the U.S. House, from 1909 to 1941.

== Early life and career ==
Taylor was born on a farm near Metamora, Illinois on June 19, 1858. He attended the common schools of Illinois and Kansas, and graduated from the high school at Leavenworth, Kansas, in 1881. Taylor moved to Leadville, Colorado and was principal of Leadville High School from 1881 to 1882. He graduated from the University of Michigan Law School in 1884, and was admitted to the bar the same year. He returned to Leadville and commenced the practice of law.

Taylor served as superintendent of schools of Lake County in 1884, and as deputy district attorney in 1885. He moved to Glenwood Springs, Colorado in 1887 and resumed private practice. Taylor served as district attorney of the ninth judicial district from 1887 to 1889.

== Early political career ==
He served in the Colorado Senate from 1896 to 1908 and served as president pro tempore for one term. Taylor was city attorney from 1896 to 1900 and county attorney in 1901 and 1902.

== Tenure in Congress ==
Taylor was elected to the 61st United States Congress as a Democrat in the 1908 election and was reelected to the 16 succeeding Congresses, served from March 4, 1909, until his death in Denver, Colorado on September 3, 1941. Taylor served as the Chairman of the Subcommittee of the Committee on Mines and Mining that investigated the Copper Country Strike of 1913–14. Taylor served as chairman of the Committee on Irrigation of Arid Lands (65th Congress) and Committee on Appropriations (75th, 76th, and 77th Congresses).

He is best known for sponsoring the Taylor Grazing Act, enacted in 1934, which regulates grazing on federal lands. He also was responsible for the legislation in 1921 that changed the name of the Grand River to the Colorado River.

== Death ==
Taylor died in office on September 3, 1941, at the age of 83. He is interred in a mausoleum in Rosebud Cemetery in Glenwood Springs, Colorado.

== Electoral history ==
Edward T. Taylor electoral history

1914 United States House of Representatives elections
| Party | Candidate | Votes | % |
|---|---|---|---|
| Democratic | Edward T. Taylor (Incumbent) | 26,562 | 57.83 |
| Republican | H. J. Baird | 15,015 | 32.69 |
| Socialist | George Kunkle | 4,353 | 9.48 |
| Total votes | | 45,930 | 100.0 |
| Democratic win (new seat) | | | |

1916 United States House of Representatives elections
| Party | Candidate | Votes | % |
|---|---|---|---|
| Democratic | Edward T. Taylor (incumbent) | 30,926 | 65.78 |
| Republican | H. J. Baird | 13,397 | 28.49 |
| Socialist | Emery D. Cox | 2,695 | 5.73 |
| Total votes | | 47,018 | 100.0 |
| Democratic hold | | | |

1918 United States House of Representatives elections
| Party | Candidate | Votes | % |
|---|---|---|---|
| Democratic | Edward T. Taylor (incumbent) | 22,423 | 65.72 |
| Republican | Straud M. Logan | 11,695 | 34.28 |
| Total votes | | 34,118 | 100.0 |
| Democratic hold | | | |

1920 United States House of Representatives elections
| Party | Candidate | Votes | % |
|---|---|---|---|
| Democratic | Edward T. Taylor (incumbent) | 25,994 | 55.32 |
| Republican | Merle D. Vincent | 20,991 | 44.68 |
| Total votes | | 46,985 | 100.0 |
| Democratic hold | | | |

1922 United States House of Representatives elections
| Party | Candidate | Votes | % |
|---|---|---|---|
| Democratic | Edward T. Taylor (incumbent) | 30,331 | 64.26 |
| Republican | Merle D. Vincent | 16,870 | 35.74 |
| Total votes | | 47,201 | 100.0 |
| Democratic hold | | | |

1924 United States House of Representatives elections
| Party | Candidate | Votes | % |
|---|---|---|---|
| Democratic | Edward T. Taylor (incumbent) | 33,262 | 65.54 |
| Republican | Webster S. Whinnery | 17,486 | 34.46 |
| Total votes | | 50,748 | 100.0 |
| Democratic hold | | | |

1926 United States House of Representatives elections
| Party | Candidate | Votes | % |
|---|---|---|---|
| Democratic | Edward T. Taylor (incumbent) | 32,093 | 66.75 |
| Republican | Webster S. Whinnery | 15,990 | 33.25 |
| Total votes | | 48,083 | 100.0 |
| Democratic hold | | | |

1928 United States House of Representatives elections
| Party | Candidate | Votes | % |
|---|---|---|---|
| Democratic | Edward T. Taylor (incumbent) | 30,142 | 58.84 |
| Republican | William P. Dale | 21,089 | 41.16 |
| Total votes | | 51,231 | 100.0 |
| Democratic hold | | | |

1930 United States House of Representatives elections
| Party | Candidate | Votes | % |
|---|---|---|---|
| Democratic | Edward T. Taylor (incumbent) | 34,536 | 66.95 |
| Republican | Webster S. Whinnery | 17,051 | 33.05 |
| Total votes | | 51,587 | 100.0 |
| Democratic hold | | | |

1932 United States House of Representatives elections
| Party | Candidate | Votes | % |
|---|---|---|---|
| Democratic | Edward T. Taylor (incumbent) | 40,736 | 65.99 |
| Republican | Richard C. Callen | 20,993 | 34.01 |
| Total votes | | 61,729 | 100.0 |
| Democratic hold | | | |

1934 United States House of Representatives elections
| Party | Candidate | Votes | % |
|---|---|---|---|
| Democratic | Edward T. Taylor (incumbent) | 39,747 | 67.30 |
| Republican | Harry McDevitt | 17,234 | 29.18 |
| Veterans' Party | Gustavis A. Billstrom | 1,625 | 2.75 |
| Independent | O. W. Daggett | 457 | 0.77 |
| Total votes | | 59,063 | 100.0 |
| Democratic hold | | | |

1936 United States House of Representatives elections
| Party | Candidate | Votes | % |
|---|---|---|---|
| Democratic | Edward T. Taylor (incumbent) | 42,010 | 65.45 |
| Republican | John S. Woody | 22,175 | 34.55 |
| Total votes | | 64,185 | 100.0 |
| Democratic hold | | | |

1938 United States House of Representatives elections
| Party | Candidate | Votes | % |
|---|---|---|---|
| Democratic | Edward T. Taylor (incumbent) | 43,596 | 63.74 |
| Republican | John S. Woody | 24,805 | 36.26 |
| Total votes | | 68,401 | 100.0 |
| Democratic hold | | | |

1940 United States House of Representatives elections
| Party | Candidate | Votes | % |
|---|---|---|---|
| Democratic | Edward T. Taylor (incumbent) | 44,095 | 59.41 |
| Republican | Paul W. Crawford | 30,126 | 40.59 |
| Total votes | | 74,221 | 100.0 |
| Democratic hold | | | |

== See also ==
- List of members of the United States Congress who died in office (1900–1949)

U.S. House of Representatives
| Preceded by George W. Cook | Member of the U.S. House of Representatives from Colorado's at-large congressional district 1909–1915 | Succeeded by District inactive |
| Preceded by District created | Member of the U.S. House of Representatives from Colorado's 4th congressional district 1915–1941 | Succeeded by Robert F. Rockwell |
