= Frances McEwen Belford =

American activist (1839–1921)

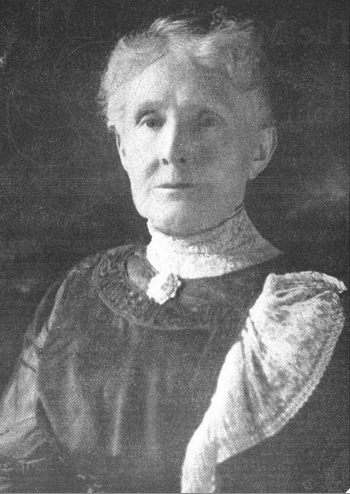
- Belford in a 1919 publication
- Born: January 13, 1839; Lewistown, Pennsylvania, US
- Died: January 27, 1921 (aged 82); Denver, Colorado, US
- Other name: "Mother of the Lincoln Highway"
- Occupation: Activist
- Spouse: James B. Belford (m. 1860)
- Children: 8, including Frances Belford Wayne

Frances McEwen Belford (born Frances C. McEwen; January 13, 1839 – January 27, 1921) was an American activist based in Denver, Colorado, known as the "Mother of the Lincoln Highway" for her leadership in creating the coast-to-coast interstate highway named for Abraham Lincoln.

== Early life ==
Frances C. McEwen was born on January 13, 1839, in Lewistown, Pennsylvania, the daughter of John S. McEwen and Isabella Barkley Highlands McEwen. She met Abraham Lincoln once, in Illinois, soon after he was elected president in 1861.

== Career ==
Belford was known as the "Mother of the Lincoln Highway". She addressed women's clubs and she lobbied lawmakers, asking "And what could be finer evidence of national loyalty than a wide, fair highway, traced through the heart of the land, built, maintained, guarded, beautified by the people of the states traversed by it?"

Belford was the first woman to serve on Colorado's State Board of Charities, Corrections, and Pardons. She was a trustee of the Colorado state teachers' college, and of the state agricultural college as well. Her husband was a Congressman and her neighbor was Sarah Platt-Decker, president of the General Federation of Women's Clubs, which gave her access to national audiences for her ideas. She chaired the legislative committee of Colorado's Woman's Christian Temperance Union for five years, and spoke on "Women and the Affairs of the State" at Colorado's "Congress of the Women" in 1901.

== Personal life ==
Frances McEwen married lawyer James B. Belford in 1860. They had eight children, including a daughter, Frances Belford Wayne, who became a noted journalist in Denver. She was widowed in 1910 and she died in Denver on January 27, 1921, aged 82.

A dormitory at the University of Northern Colorado is named Belford Hall after Frances McEwen Belford.
