= Frances Belford Wayne =

American journalist (1870–1951)

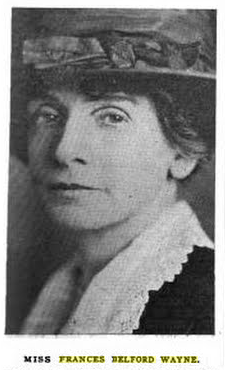
- Photo in a 1922 issue of The Fourth Estate
- Born: Frances Belford; June 17, 1870; La Porte, Indiana, US
- Died: July 16, 1951 (aged 81); Central City, Colorado, US
- Occupation: Journalist
- Parents: James B. Belford (father); Frances McEwen Belford (mother)

Frances Belford "Pinky" Wayne (June 17, 1870 – July 16, 1951) was an American journalist based in Denver, Colorado. She is remembered for her newspaper work, and for her leadership on establishing public lighting and other holiday decorations in the downtown, beginning in 1918.

== Early life ==
Frances Belford was born in La Porte, Indiana on June 17, 1870, the daughter of James B. Belford and Frances McEwen Belford. Her father was a judge and a congressman and her mother was a temperance activist and a trustee at two colleges. The family moved west to Central City, Colorado in 1874, when Frances was a girl.

== Career ==
Frances Belford Wayne joined the Rocky Mountain News in 1906, as a drama and music critic. She became a features writer and investigative reporter. She worked for the Denver Post from 1909 to 1946. She reported from the Ludlow massacre, and wrote features about opium addiction, reproductive health, and immigration. She worked with Emily Griffith for the establishment of a public technical school in Denver. She was a member of the Denver Women's Press Club; since 1940, the club has awarded a scholarship in her name.

In 1918, Frances Wayne saw the possibilities of outdoor lighting decorations for Christmas, and started spotlighting colorful lighting displays in Denver. This developed into one of the largest urban holiday lighting displays in the United States. She also helped to found the Myron Stratton Home for the Aged and Dependent Youth, and a state reformatory for boys. In 1944, she persuaded the governor of Colorado to appoint scientist Florence R. Sabin to a post-war planning commission.

== Awards ==
In 1922, she was awarded a University Recognition gold medal from the University of Colorado for "ready and effective championship of sound efforts and movements for the public well being." Wayne was named "Woman of the Year" by the Business and Professional Women's Club of Denver in 1946.

== Personal life ==
Frances Belford married John Anthony Wayne before 1906; they soon separated and divorced in 1908. She died in Central City from cancer on July 16, 1951.
