= The Bellville Countryman =

American semi-weekly newspaper

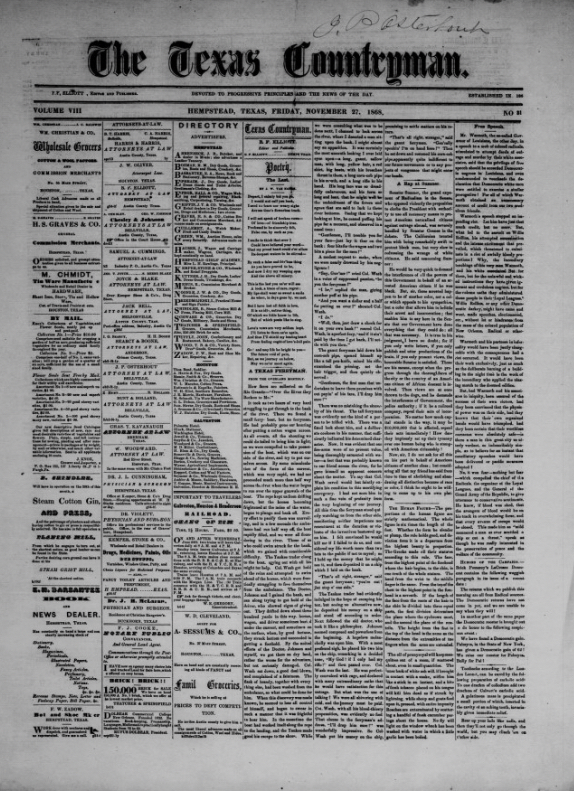
- November 27, 1868 edition of The Texas Countryman
- Format: Broadsheet halfsheet (during American Civil War)
- Publisher: John Patterson Osterhout
- Editor: W. S. Thayer
- Founded: July 28, 1860
- Ceased publication: August 21, 1865 (Bellville Countryman); 1869 (Texas Countryman)
- City: Bellville, Texas
- Country: United States

The Belville Countryman, later The Texas Countryman, was an American Democratic semi-weekly newspaper serving Bellville, Texas. It was edited by W. S. Thayer and published by John Patterson Osterhout. The motto was "Independent in All Things–Neutral in None", and had a column published in German. It operated between July 28, 1860, until August 21, 1865, and was published in a halfsheet format during the American Civil War. It was replaced by The Texas Countryman, which operated until 1869.
