= George G. Symes =

American politician (1840–1893)

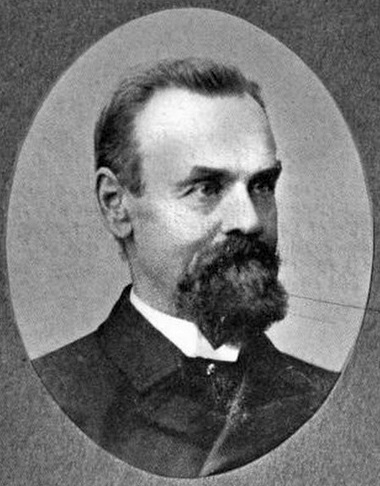

Member of the U.S. House of Representatives from Colorado's at-large district
- In office March 4, 1885 – March 3, 1889
- Preceded by: James B. Belford
- Succeeded by: Hosea Townsend

Associate Justice of the Supreme Court of the Montana Territory
- In office May 1869 – February 1871
- Appointed by: Ulysses S. Grant
- Preceded by: Lyman E. Munson
- Succeeded by: John Luttrell Murphy

Personal details
- Born: George Gifford Symes; April 28, 1840 Ashtabula County, Ohio, U.S.
- Died: November 3, 1893 (aged 53) Denver, Colorado, U.S.
- Cause of death: Suicide
- Resting place: Fairmount Cemetery, Denver
- Party: Republican
- Spouse: Sophie Foster (m. 1875–1893)
- Children: John Foster Symes^{(b. 1878; died 1951)}; Mary Gifford Symes^{(b. 1879; died 1895)}; George Gifford Symes^{(b. 1884; died 1967)}
- Relatives: John Wells Foster (father-in-law)
- Profession: Lawyer

Military service
- Allegiance: United States
- Branch/service: United States Volunteers; Union Army
- Years of service: 1861–1865
- Rank: Colonel, USV
- Unit: 2nd Reg. Wis. Vol. Infantry; 25th Reg. Wis. Vol. Infantry
- Commands: 44th Reg. Wis. Vol. Infantry
- Battles/wars: American Civil War

George Gifford Symes (April 28, 1840 – November 3, 1893) was an American lawyer, Republican politician, and pioneer of Wisconsin, Montana, and Colorado. He was a member of congress, representing Colorado's at-large district during the 49th and 50th U.S. congresses (1885–1889), and was a justice of the Supreme Court of the Montana Territory. Earlier in his life, he served as a Union Army officer in the American Civil War.

== Biography ==
George G. Symes was born in Ashtabula County, Ohio, in April 1840. He received his early education there, then moved with his parents to La Crosse, Wisconsin, in 1852, where he completed his education. At age 20, he began the study of law in the offices of Angus Cameron (later a U.S. senator).

== Civil War service ==
At the outbreak of the Civil War, he joined up with a company of volunteers for the Union Army, known as the "La Crosse Light Guard". His company became Company B in the 2nd Wisconsin Infantry Regiment, and mustered into federal service on April 12, 1861. He was wounded at the First Battle of Bull Run, and was discharged due to those wounds in December.

After recovering from his wounds, he volunteered again and was commissioned adjutant of the 25th Wisconsin Infantry Regiment. After one year as adjutant, he was promoted to captain of Company F in that regiment. With the 25th Wisconsin Infantry, he participated in the Siege of Vicksburg and the Atlanta campaign. He was wounded again at Decatur, Georgia, in July 1864.

While recuperating, he was offered the command of the new 44th Wisconsin Infantry Regiment and accepted. He returned to Wisconsin to assist in organizing the new regiment. The 44th Wisconsin Infantry was called to service before fully organized, and five companies were sent forward under their lieutenant colonel in November 1864. Symes completed the organization of the regiment and joined the advance battalion at Nashville, Tennessee, in February 1865. They spent the remainder of the war on guard duty in Tennessee and Kentucky.

After the war, he was elected as a companion of the Colorado Commandery of the Military Order of the Loyal Legion of the United States.

== Political career ==
After the war, Symes remained in Paducah, Kentucky, where the 44th Wisconsin Infantry had been stationed. In 1867, he was the Radical Republican nominee for United States House of Representatives in Kentucky's 1st congressional district. He challenged Democratic incumbent, Lawrence S. Trimble, but was defeated. He and another Republican candidate challenged their defeat in the election, claiming that Union voters had been intimidated and alleging that Trimble should be disqualified for having aided the rebellion. The challenge was also unsuccessful.

Symes continued working as a lawyer in Paducah until 1869, when he was appointed associate justice of the Supreme Court of the Montana Territory, by U.S. president Ulysses S. Grant. He served only two years as justice, then resigned to resume the practice of law in Helena, Montana.

In 1874, Symes decided to relocate to Denver, Colorado, to establish a legal practice there. The legal community of Montana threw him a banquet at his departure in February 1874, where his career was celebrated by prominent Montanans.

=== Congress ===
Symes was elected as a Republican to the Forty-ninth and Fiftieth Congresses (March 4, 1885 – March 3, 1889).

== After Congress ==
After leaving Congress, he engaged in the management of his estate and in the practice of law.

== Suicide ==
Symes committed suicide on November 3, 1893, by shooting himself in the head. He left a letter for his wife saying he feared another night in agony. Symes had been wounded near the spine during his Civil War service, and had experienced significant discomfort and depression in the subsequent years. By the time of his suicide, his condition had been exacerbated by four weeks of pneumonia. At the time of his death, his wife had been living for a year in Massachusetts with their children, for her own health concerns.

He was interred in Denver's Fairmount Cemetery.

== Personal life and family ==
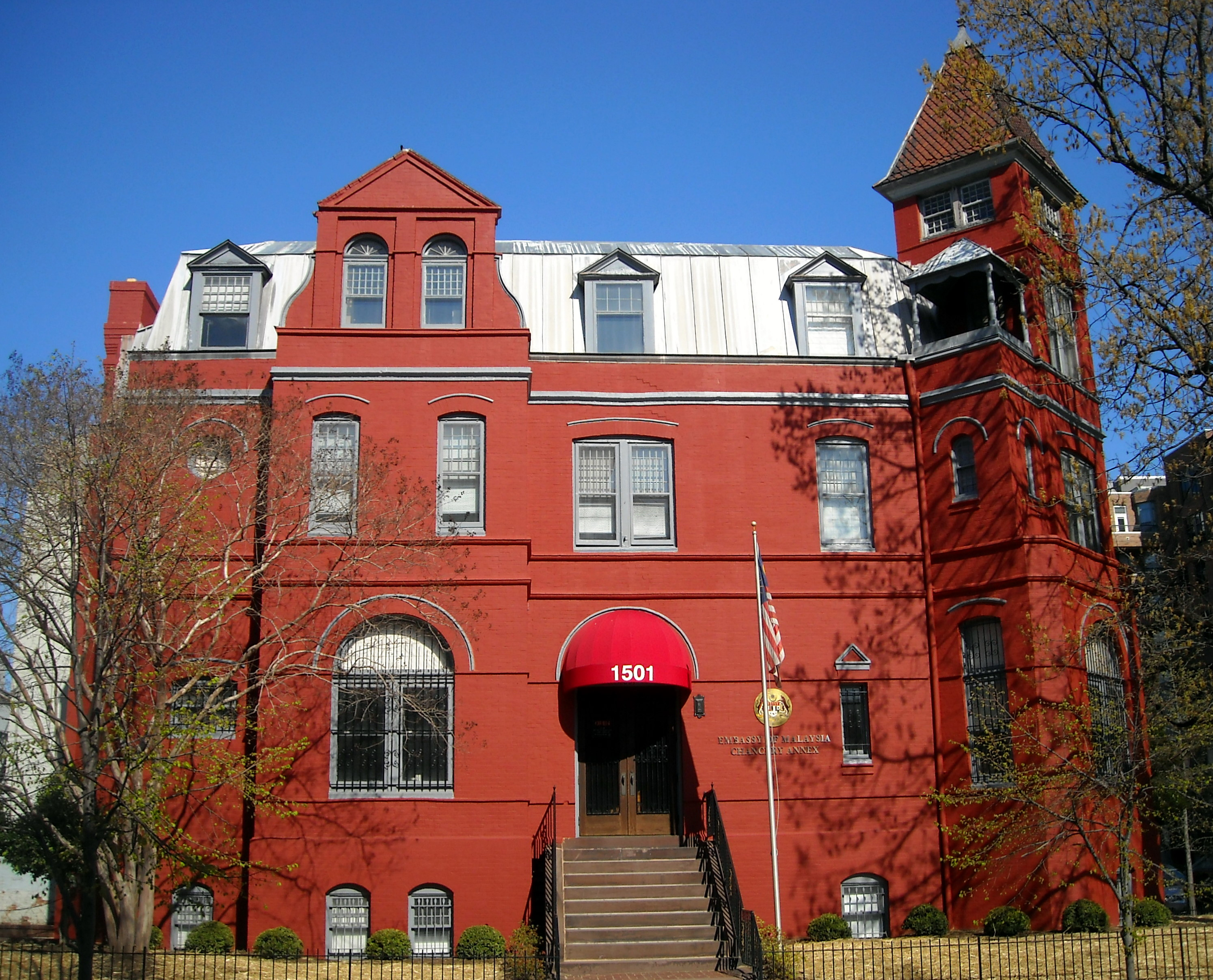
Former residence of George G. Symes in Washington, D.C.

George Symes was the eldest son of William Symes and his wife Mary (née Gifford). His parents had emigrated to the United States from England in 1836.

George Symes married Sophie Foster on July 3, 1875, at Chicago. Sophie was a daughter of prominent geologist John Wells Foster. Their marriage produced at least three children. Their eldest son was John Foster Symes, who served 28 years as a United States district judge in Colorado, and was earlier United States attorney in Colorado.

=== Residency ===
While serving in Congress, Symes lived at 1501 18th Street, N.W., in Washington, D.C., in the Dupont Circle Historic District. His former home is now an annex of the Embassy of Malaysia.

Military offices
Regiment established	Command of the 44th Wisconsin Infantry Regiment; July 1864 – August 28, 1865	Regiment abolished
U.S. House of Representatives
Preceded by James B. Belford	Member of the U.S. House of Representatives from Colorado's at-large congressional district 1885–1889	Succeeded by Hosea Townsend
Legal offices
Preceded by Lyman E. Munson	Associate Justice of the Supreme Court of the Montana Territory; 1869–1871	Succeeded by John Luttrell Murphy
