= George W. Cook =

American politician (1851–1916)

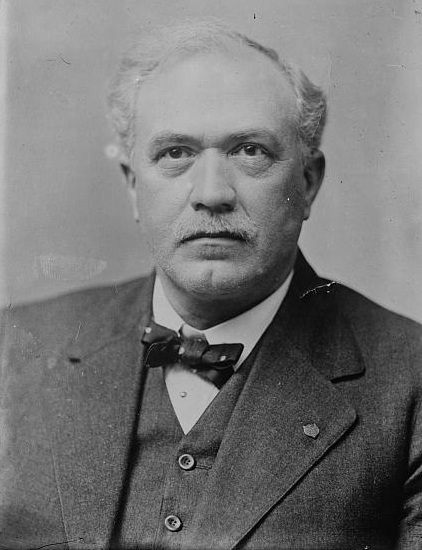
- Cook, c. 1907

Member of the U.S. House of Representatives from Colorado's at-large district
- In office March 4, 1907 – March 3, 1909
- Preceded by: Franklin Eli Brooks
- Succeeded by: Edward Thomas Taylor

Personal details
- Born: George Washington Cook; November 10, 1851 Bedford, Indiana
- Died: December 18, 1916 (aged 65) Pueblo, Colorado
- Resting place: Fairmount Cemetery
- Occupation: Legislator, military officer, miner

George Washington Cook (November 10, 1851 – December 18, 1916) was a U.S. representative from Colorado. At eleven years of age, he ran away from home to serve during the Civil War. He was a drummer boy and then a chief regimental clerk. After the war, he completed his public school education and then attended Indiana University. His varied career included working for railroad and mining companies, and service as a mayor and a legislator. He was department commander for the Grand Army of the Republic.

== Early life ==
Born in Bedford, Indiana, his parents were Agnes (Dodson) and Samuel Cook. His great-grandfather, George W. Cook, served in the American Revolutionary War from North Carolina. His maternal grandfather served as a major in the War of 1812.

At the age of eleven Cook ran away from home to enlist during the Civil War. (Note: He is also reported to have run away at age 12 in 1863.) His father served in the 13th Indiana Cavalry Regiment as a lieutenant and died of disease during the war or from wounds he received. His only brother was a bugler in his father's regiment and died at age 15 during the war.

== Civil War ==
He enlisted in the 15th Indiana Infantry Regiment, in the Union Army and served as a drummer boy for a number of regiments in the Army of the Cumberland. He was transferred to the 155th Indiana Infantry Regiment, and served as chief regimental clerk, (Note: He is also said to have served in the 145th Indiana Infantry Regiment.) a position he assumed at age 14. He was the youngest chief regimental clerk in the Union Army. He was with General William Tecumseh Sherman on Sherman's March to the Sea and served until the end of the war.

== Education ==
At the close of the Civil War, he attended the public schools, Bedford Academy, and Indiana University.

== Career ==
In 1872, he had a job for a railroad in Chicago. He was in Chicago in 1880 when he entered the employ of the Louisville, New Albany, and Chicago Railway. Cook moved to Leadville, Colorado, in 1880 and became division superintendent of the Denver & Rio Grande Railroad. He suspended railroad service and organized a group to save 100 miners who were trapped in the Homestake mine by a snowslide near Leadville. During another winter storm when people began to starve, he hired 1000 miners to clear the railroad tracks so that Leadville could receive food shipments. He served as mayor of Leadville from 1885 to 1887.

He moved to Denver in 1888 and became general sales agent for the Colorado Fuel and Iron and became department commander of the Grand Army of the Republic for Colorado and Wyoming in 1891 and 1892. He became an independent mining operator in 1893 and became senior vice commander in chief of the Grand Army of the Republic in 1905 and 1906. He also organized and commanded the Cook Drum Corps of Denver.

=== Congress ===
Cook was elected as a Republican to the 60th Congress (March 4, 1907 – March 3, 1909) but was not a candidate for renomination in 1908.

== Later career and death ==
After leaving office, Cook returned to Colorado and resumed mining operations. He lived in Denver that later part of his life, until about 1914 when his mental state declines and he was admitted into a state asylum in Pueblo, Colorado and died there on December 18, 1916. (Note: He is also said to have died December 15, 1916.) He was interred in Fairmount Cemetery in Denver.

== Personal life ==
He married Nina Florence, the daughter of John Boyle, a Canadian merchant. They had one son, George Washington Cook Jr. who was first lieutenant of the 43rd Infantry.

== Notes ==
U.S. House of Representatives
| Preceded by Franklin Eli Brooks | Member of the U.S. House of Representatives from Colorado's at-large congressional district 1907–1909 | Succeeded by Edward T. Taylor |
