= John Patterson Osterhout =

American publisher and judge (1826–1903)

- Born: May 8, 1826; Osterhout, Pennsylvania, US
- Died: January 3, 1903 (aged 76); Belton, Texas, US
- Education: University of Pennsylvania; Wyoming Seminary
- Occupations: American publisher, lawyer, judge
- Political party: Republican (by 1870)
- Children: 6

John Patterson Osterhout (May 8, 1826 – January 3, 1903) was an American publisher, lawyer, and judge.

== Biography ==
Osterhout was born on May 8, 1826, in Osterhout, Pennsylvania, the youngest of ten children to businessman David Osterhout and Sarah Osterhout (née Michelle). He was of Dutch, Irish, and Scottish descent. An attendee of Franklin Academy (precursor of the University of Pennsylvania) and Wyoming Seminary, he was admitted to the bar on September 3, 1851, after which moved to Bellville, Texas in September. There, he developed pro-slavery and secessionist views, as well as owning slaves. He communicated his views in The Bellville Countryman, which he founded on July 26, 1860. During the American Civil War, he served in the Texas Militia and continued publishing the newspaper. After the war, he transitioned to promoting the Lost Cause of the Confederacy. He sold the newspaper in 1968, returning to practicing law, as well as maintaining a railway company.

Despite his former pro-slavery views, he supported the Republican Party by 1870. From 1870 to 1876, he served as judge of the Thirty-fourth State District Court following his nomination by legislator John G. Bell, a friend. From 1880 to 1885, and from 1889 to 1893, he was the postmaster of Belton, where he had moved his family to in September 1870. He campaigned for U.S. Congress three times, losing in all of them. After serving as postmaster of Belton, he became a rancher and storeowner.

Osterhout was Baptist. On February 23, 1859, he married Junia M. Roberts; they had six children together. He retired in 1897, the same year his wife died, himself dying on January 3, 1903, aged 76, in Belton.
