= John Randolph Hoxie =

John Randolph Hoxie was a Quaker, Democratic politician, bank executive, cattle rancher, co-founder of Chicago's Union Stockyards and member of the Chicago Stock Exchange. He is the namesake of Hoxie Boulevard in Chicago and Hoxie, TX. Two of his mansions remain at 4440 South Michigan Avenue in Chicago and in San Gabriel, TX. His first cousin was fellow Quaker abolitionist and railroad manager Herbert Melville Hoxie, nicknamed "Hub."

== Early life ==
Born in 1831 in Macedon, New York to New England Quakers Cornelius and Anna (nee Brownell) Hoxie, John graduated from the Macedon Academy for Boys in 1848 before moving west to Michigan where he began working in livestock and stockyards. He moved west again at age 28 and settled in Chicago in 1859 and worked as a manager at the Lake Shore Road stock yards through the Civil War.

== Gilded Age Chicago ==
In 1873, Hoxie married Mary J. Hamilton, the daughter of Chicago pioneer, Polemus D. Hamilton. John and Mary Hoxie built a home on land he developed in Hyde Park at 4440 S. Michigan Avenue and Gustavus Swift built a mansion across the street in 1890, both of which still stand as of 2021. Mary Hoxie stayed in the home until she died in 1924. Hoxie thrived in post-war Chicago, first as a manager for the Lake Shore and Michigan Southern Railroad, then as a co-founder of the Union Stock Yards, a President of the Stock Yards National Bank and active in city politics as a Democrat.

=== Hoxie for Congress ===
John R. Hoxie entered the Democratic convention seeking the 1876 nomination for Illinois' 1st Congressional District in an open seat race against Republican William Aldrich. The progressive news coverage of the day implies Hoxie's candidacy was "bled" by Chicago's machine politics once it was known Hoxie was spending his own considerable fortune to secure delegates.

== Texas Expansion ==
in 1878, seeking relief from long Chicago winters, purchased 9,000 acres northeastern Williamson County, Texas and in 1882 he completed building his "Hoxie House." Hoxie personally managed the vertical integration of his Chicago meatpacking business through the acquisition of nearly a million acres near San Gabriel, Texas where he ranched hundreds of thousands steer and hogs, reportedly the largest hog farm in North America. In 1888, Hoxie was being promoted by his business associates as a potential candidate for Mayor of Fort Worth. The following year, Hoxie was President of the Farmers and Mechanics Bank of Fort Worth. By 1890, he had become a leading figure in business and politics in Fort Worth and Austin, culminating in a BBQ described as a "triumph" and featuring the Fort Worth Mayor and thousands of citizens. In 1894, Hoxie was made President and added to the Board of Directors of the First National Bank of Taylor, TX.

=== Hoxie, Texas ===
A community sprung up to support the operations of Hoxie House including a blacksmith, school, gin, saddlery and 300 Texans which was named Hoxie, Texas when the U.S. Postal Service established an office there in 1900. Today, only the post office remains as part of a neighborhood of Taylor, TX.

== Death and Poki Roni Murder ==
John R. Hoxie died on November 22, 1896, at his home on S. Michigan Avenue in Chicago. He was 65 years old. His nephew, Richard Mortimer "Mort" Hoxie took over the Texas hog ranch and meatpacking business in Fort Worth. Mort's granddaughter, Patricia Kirchner (nee Bower), the owner of the Poki Roni Ranch in El Paso, TX, was murdered in 2008 by her son, Travis Kirchner, who subsequently died in custody by suicide.
