= Thomas M. Patterson =

Union United States Army soldier

Thomas MacDonald Patterson
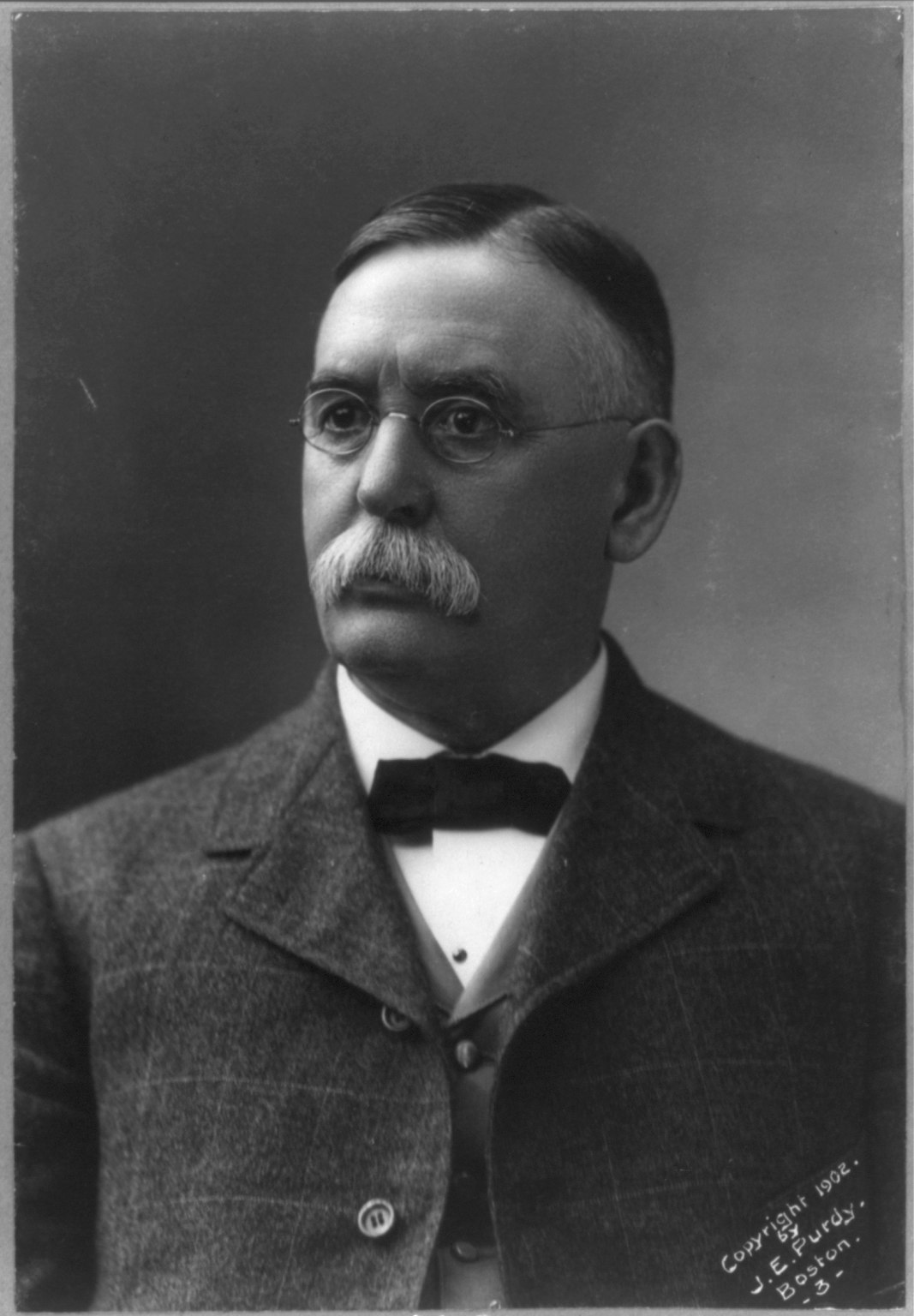

United States Senator from Colorado
- In office March 4, 1901 – March 3, 1907
- Preceded by: Edward O. Wolcott
- Succeeded by: Simon Guggenheim

Member of the U.S. House of Representatives from Colorado's at-large district
- In office December 13, 1877 – March 3, 1879
- Preceded by: James B. Belford
- Succeeded by: James B. Belford

Delegate to the U.S. House of Representatives from Colorado Territory's at-large district
- In office March 4, 1875 – August 1, 1876
- Preceded by: Jerome B. Chaffee
- Succeeded by: District eliminated

Personal details
- Born: November 4, 1839 County Carlow, Ireland
- Died: July 23, 1916 (aged 76) Denver, Colorado
- Resting place: Fairmount Cemetery, Denver, Colorado
- Party: Democratic

Thomas MacDonald Patterson (November 4, 1839 – July 23, 1916) was an American politician and newspaper publisher who served as a member of the United States Senate and United States House of Representatives from Colorado.

== Early life ==
Thomas MacDonald Patterson was born in County Carlow, Ireland on November 4, 1839, but his family emigrated to the United States when he was a boy, and they settled in New York City in 1849. A few years later, they moved to Crawfordsville, Indiana, where the young Patterson found work in a printing office and with a watchmaker and jeweler.

== Career ==
When the Civil War broke out in 1861, Patterson enlisted in the Eleventh Regiment of the Indiana Volunteer Infantry. He returned home in 1862, and went to college first at Indiana Asbury University (now DePauw University), then at Wabash College.

Patterson was admitted to the bar in 1867 and began his practice in Crawfordsville. In 1872, he moved to Denver, where he started a law practice and was city attorney in 1873 and 1874.

Patterson's political career began when he became a member of the Democratic National Committee in 1874 (a post he held until 1880). He was then elected as a Democrat to be a Delegate from the Colorado Territory to the 44th Congress (1875–76), stepping down when the Territory became a State. James B. Belford, a Republican, was initially elected as Colorado's first Congressman, but Patterson successfully contested his election and served in the U.S. House of Representatives in the 45th Congress (1877–79). Patterson chose not to stand for re-election in 1878.

After leaving Congress, Patterson resumed the practice of law in Denver and purchased first the Rocky Mountain News in 1890 and later the Denver Times. During these years, Patterson was twice an unsuccessful Democratic candidate for Governor of Colorado including in 1888, when he was defeated by Republican Job Adams Cooper.

Patterson returned to national politics in 1900 when he was elected as a Democrat to the United States Senate, serving a single term (1901–1907) and refusing to stand for re-election. While a senator, Patterson served on the United States Senate Committee on the Philippines, which investigated alleged war crimes committed during the Philippine–American War.

After leaving the Senate, Patterson published his newspaper until his death.

== Death ==
Patterson died at his home in Denver on July 23, 1916. His remains are interred in Fairmount Cemetery.

== See also ==
- List of United States senators born outside the United States

Party political offices
Preceded by Alva Adams	Democratic nominee for Governor of Colorado; 1888	Succeeded by Caldwell Yeaman
Preceded by Elias M. Ammons	Democratic nominee for Governor of Colorado; 1914	Succeeded by Julius Caldeen Gunter
U.S. House of Representatives
Preceded by Jerome B. Chaffee	Delegate to the U.S. House of Representatives from Colorado; 1875–1876	Succeeded by none
Preceded by James B. Belford	Member of the U.S. House of Representatives from Colorado's at-large congressional district 1877–1879	Succeeded by James B. Belford
U.S. Senate
Preceded by Edward O. Wolcott	U.S. senator (Class 2) from Colorado; 1901–1907; Served alongside: Henry M. Teller	Succeeded by Simon Guggenheim
