= James B. Belford =

American judge (1837–1910)

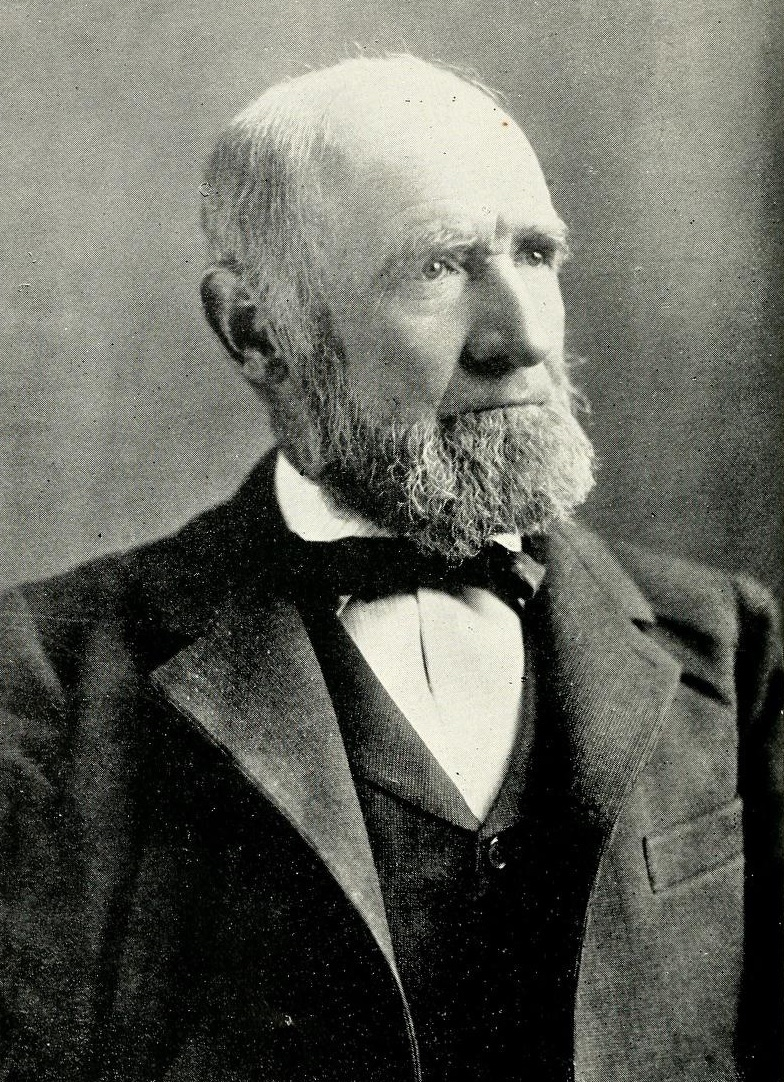
- Frontispiece of 1897's The Writings and Speeches of Hon. James B. Belford.

Member of the U.S. House of Representatives from Colorado's at-large district
- In office March 4, 1879 – March 3, 1885
- Preceded by: Thomas M. Patterson
- Succeeded by: George G. Symes
- In office October 3, 1876 – December 13, 1877 (contested election)
- Preceded by: Constituency established
- Succeeded by: Thomas M. Patterson

Member of the Indiana House of Representatives
- In office 1867

Personal details
- Born: James Burns Belford; September 28, 1837 Lewistown, Pennsylvania
- Died: January 10, 1910 (aged 72) Denver, Colorado
- Resting place: Riverside Cemetery in Denver
- Citizenship: United States
- Party: Republican
- Spouse: Frances McEwen Belford
- Children: Frances Belford Wayne
- Education: Dickinson College
- Profession: Attorney

James Burns Belford (September 28, 1837 – January 10, 1910) was a 19th-century American politician who served as a U.S. representative from Colorado.

== Biography ==
James Burns Belford was born on September 28, 1837 in Lewistown, Pennsylvania. Belford was the son of Samuel and Eliza Belford and cousin of Joseph McCrum Belford. He attended the common schools and Dickinson College in Carlisle, Pennsylvania. He studied law and was admitted to the bar in 1859.

== Career ==
Belford moved to California, Missouri and commenced practice. He moved to La Porte, Indiana in 1860, and served as member of the Indiana House of Representatives in 1867. He was appointed an associate justice of the supreme court for the Colorado Territory in 1870 and moved to Central City. He moved to Denver in 1883.

=== Congress ===
Upon the admission of Colorado into the Union, Belford was elected as a Republican to the Forty-fourth Congress from the first district of Colorado and served from October 3, 1876, until March 3, 1877. He presented credentials as a Member-elect to the Forty-fifth Congress and served from March 4, 1877 until December 13, 1877, when he was succeeded by Thomas M. Patterson, who successfully contested the election.

Belford was elected to the Forty-sixth, Forty-seventh, and Forty-eighth Congresses, and served from March 4, 1879 to March 3, 1885. He served as chairman of the Committee on Expenditures in the Department of the Treasury during the Forty-seventh Congress. He was an unsuccessful candidate for renomination in 1884, and engaged in the practice of law in Denver until his death. He was known as the "Red Rooster of the Rockies" because of his flaming red hair and "magnificently roseate beard."

In the mid-1890s he gained notoriety for successfully defending Denver conman and crime boss Soapy Smith in several cases.

== Death ==
Belford died in Denver, Colorado, on January 10, 1910 (age 72 years, 104 days). He is interred at Riverside Cemetery, Denver, Colorado.

== Family ==
He married Frances C. McEwen in 1860. Their daughter Frances Belford Wayne was a longtime newspaper journalist in Denver.

U.S. House of Representatives
Preceded by none	Member of the U.S. House of Representatives from Colorado's at-large congressional district 1876–1877	Succeeded by Thomas M. Patterson
Preceded by Thomas M. Patterson	Member of the U.S. House of Representatives from Colorado's at-large congressional district 1879–1885	Succeeded by George G. Symes
