= 1878–79 United States House of Representatives elections =

House elections for the 46th U.S. Congress

1878 United States House of Representatives elections
- June 3, 1878 – September 3, 1879

All 293 seats in the United States House of Representatives 147 seats needed for a majority
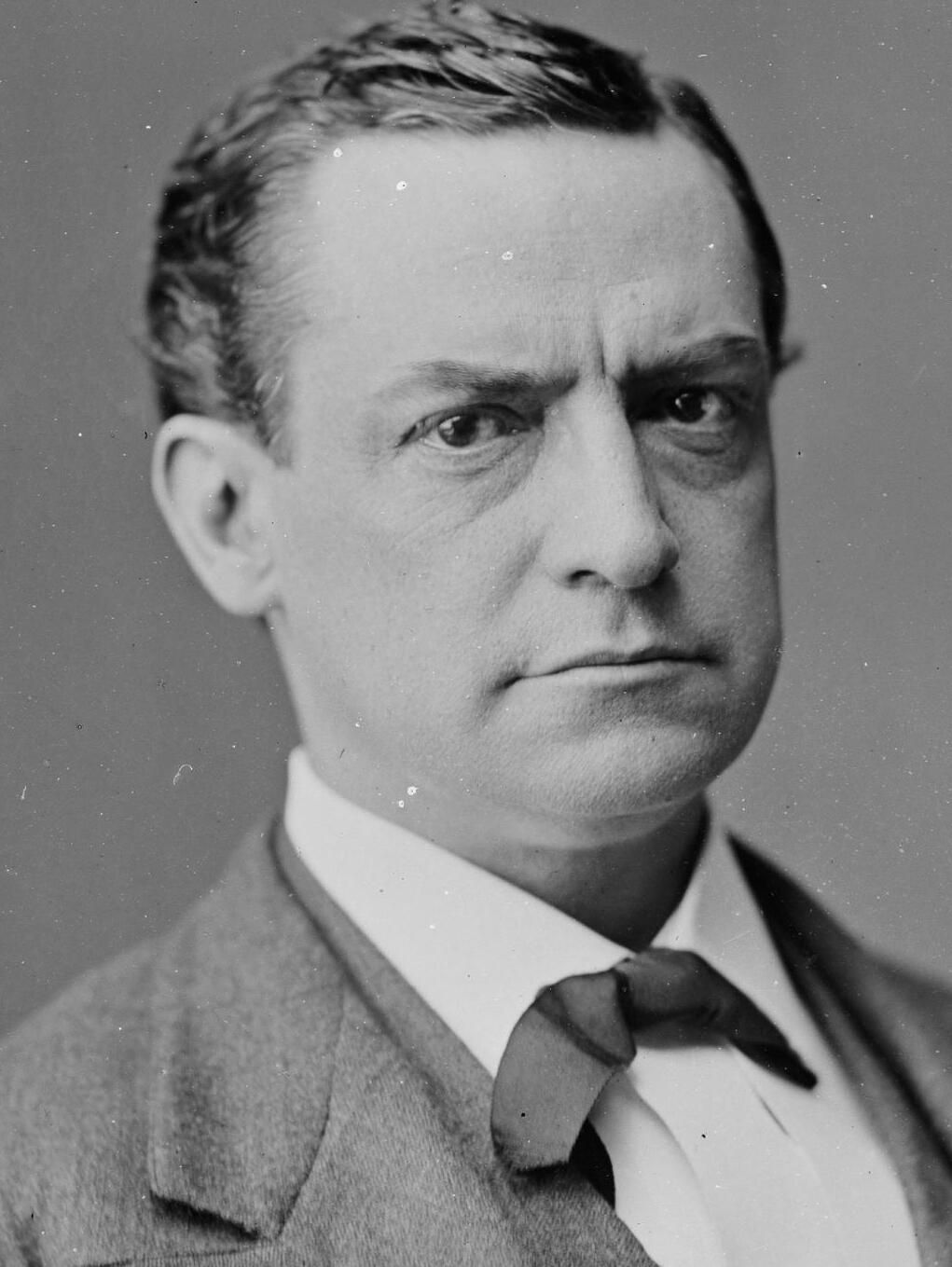

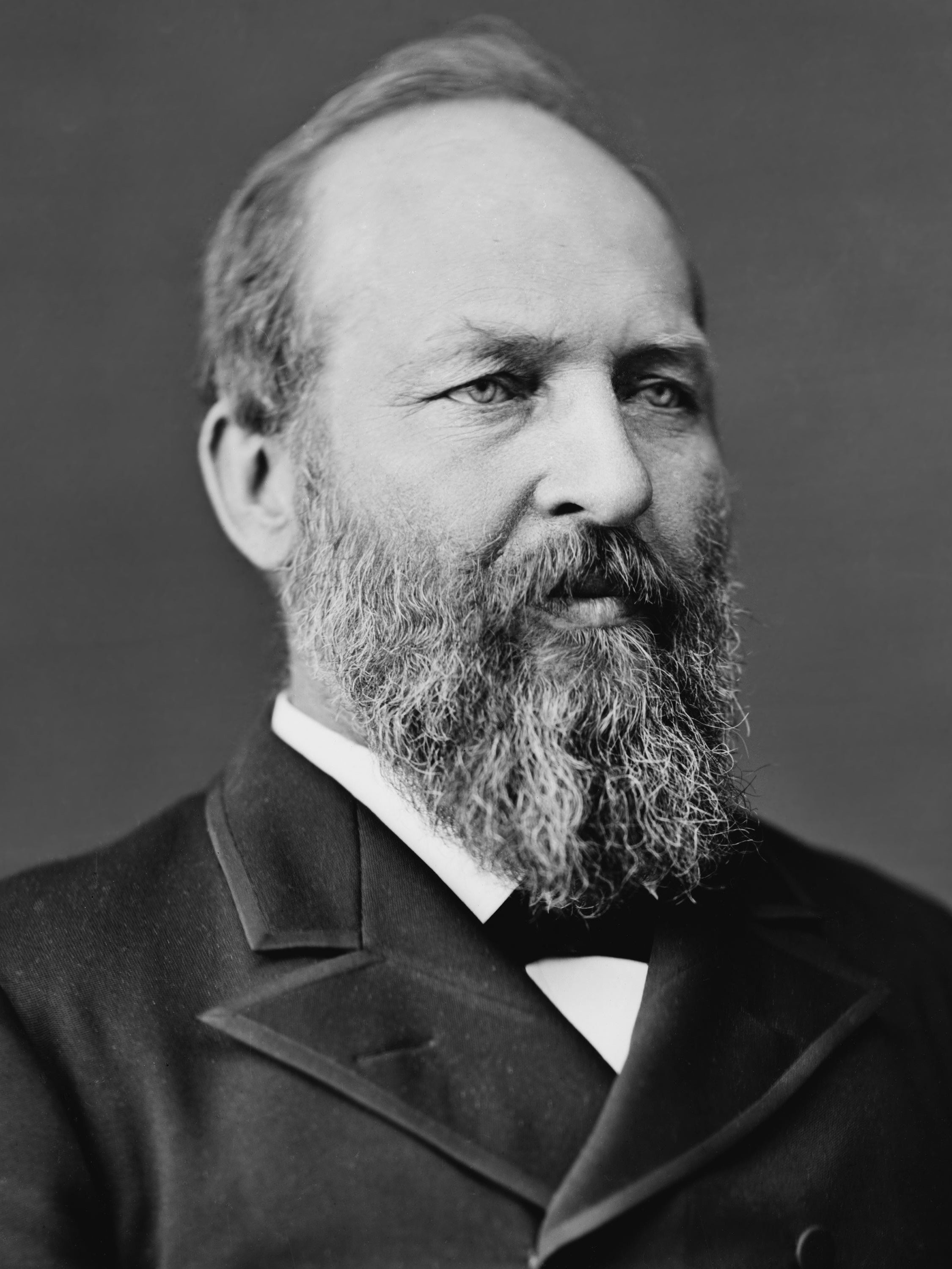
	Majority party	Minority party
Leader	Samuel J. Randall	James A. Garfield
Party	Democratic	Republican
Leader's seat	Pennsylvania 3rd	Ohio 19th
Last election	155 seats	136 seats
Seats won	141 (Note: Dubin (p. 249) counts 140 Democrats, 6 Independent Democrats, 130 Republicans (incl. 1 Independent Republican), and 11 Greenbacks at the start of the 46th United States Congress.)	132
Seat change	▼14	▼4
Popular vote	3,108,496	2,782,404
Percentage	44.20%	39.56%
Swing	▼7.07pp	▼6.91pp
	Third party	Fourth party
Party	Greenback	Independent
Last election	0 seats	2 seats (Note: Included 2 Independent Democrats.)
Seats won	13	7 (Note: Includes 7 Independent Democrats.)
Seat change	▲13	▲5
Popular vote	864,325	193,666
Percentage	12.29%	2.75%
Swing	▲11.38pp	▲1.58pp
- Results; Democratic gain Democratic hold Republican gain Republican hold Independent gain Independent hold Greenback gain
Speaker before election
Samuel Randall
Democratic
Elected Speaker
Samuel Randall
Democratic

The 1878–79 United States House of Representatives elections were held on various dates in various states between June 3, 1878, and September 3, 1879. (Note: In 1879, California held its last regular congressional election in an odd-numbered year.) Each state set its own date for its elections to the House of Representatives before or after the first session of the 46th United States Congress convened on March 18, 1879. Elections were held for all 293 seats, representing 38 states. This was the last election cycle that at least one state held its regular congressional election in an oddnumbered year.

These elections occurred in the middle of President Rutherford B. Hayes's term. With a sour economy as the nation's pressing issue, both major parties lost seats to the new Greenback Party, which was established to promote the long-term use of paper money as a solution to stop enormous economic fluctuations. The Democratic Party remained the largest party, but lost its majority. However, it allied with several independent politicians and was able to remain in power. This was the fourth and last recorded House election where both major parties lost seats at the same time.

== Election summaries ==
↓
141	7	13	132
Democratic	(Note: There were 7 Independent Democrats)	(Note: There were 13 Greenbacks)	Republican

State	Type	Total seats	Democratic		Ind. Democratic		Greenback		Republican	
State	Type	Total seats	Seats	Change	Seats	Change	Seats	Change	Seats	Change
Alabama	District	8	7	▼1	0	Steady	1	▲1	0	Steady
Arkansas	District	4	4	▲1	0	▼1	0	Steady	0	Steady
California	District	4	1	▼1	0	Steady	0	Steady	3	▲1
Colorado	At-large	1	0	▼1	0	Steady	0	Steady	1	▲1
Connecticut	District	4	1	▼2	0	Steady	0	Steady	3	▲2
Delaware	At-large	1	1	Steady	0	Steady	0	Steady	0	Steady
Florida	District	2	1	▼1	0	Steady	0	Steady	1	▲1
Georgia	District	9	6	▼2	3	▲2	0	Steady	0	Steady
Illinois	District	19	6	▼2	0	Steady	1	▲1	12	▲1
Indiana	District	13	6	▲2	0	Steady	1	▲1	6	▼3
Iowa	District	9	0	Steady	0	Steady	2	▲2	7	▼2
Kansas	District	3	0	Steady	0	Steady	0	Steady	3	Steady
Kentucky	District	10	9	▼1	1	▲1	0	Steady	0	Steady
Louisiana	District	6	6	▲1	0	Steady	0	Steady	0	▼1
Maine	District	5	0	Steady	0	Steady	2	▲2	3	▼2
Maryland	District	6	5	▼1	0	Steady	0	Steady	1	▲1
Massachusetts	District	11	1	▼1	0	Steady	0	Steady	10	▲1
Michigan	District	9	0	▼1	0	Steady	0	Steady	9	▲1
Minnesota	District	3	1	▲1	0	Steady	0	Steady	2	▼1
Mississippi	District	6	6	Steady	0	Steady	0	Steady	0	Steady
Missouri	District	13	11	▲2	1	▲1	1	▲1	0	▼4
Nebraska	At-large	1	0	Steady	0	Steady	0	Steady	1	Steady
Nevada	At-large	1	0	Steady	0	Steady	0	Steady	1	Steady
New Hampshire	District	3	0	▼1	0	Steady	0	Steady	3	▲1
New Jersey	District	7	3	▼1	0	Steady	0	Steady	4	▲1
New York	District	33	6	▼9	2	▲2	0	Steady	25	▲7
North Carolina	District	8	7	Steady	0	Steady	1	▲1	0	▼1
Ohio	District	20	11	▲3	0	Steady	0	Steady	9	▼3
Oregon	At-large	1	1	▲1	0	Steady	0	Steady	0	▼1
Pennsylvania	District	27	8	▼2	0	Steady	2	▲2	17	Steady
Rhode Island	District	2	0	Steady	0	Steady	0	Steady	2	Steady
South Carolina	District	5	5	▲3	0	Steady	0	Steady	0	▼3
Tennessee	District	10	9	▲1	0	Steady	0	Steady	1	▼1
Texas	District	6	5	▼1	0	Steady	1	▲1	0	Steady
Vermont	District	3	0	Steady	0	Steady	1	▲1	2	▼1
Virginia	District	9	8	Steady	0	Steady	0	Steady	1	Steady
West Virginia	District	3	3	Steady	0	Steady	0	Steady	0	Steady
Wisconsin	District	8	3	Steady	0	Steady	0	Steady	5	Steady
Total		293	141 48.1%	▼14	7 2.4%	▲5	13 4.4%	▲13	132 45.1%	▼5

Popular vote
Democratic	44.20%
Republican	39.56%
Greenback	12.29%
Independent	2.75%
Others	1.20%

House seats
Democratic	48.12%
Republican	45.05%
Greenback	4.44%
Independent	2.39%

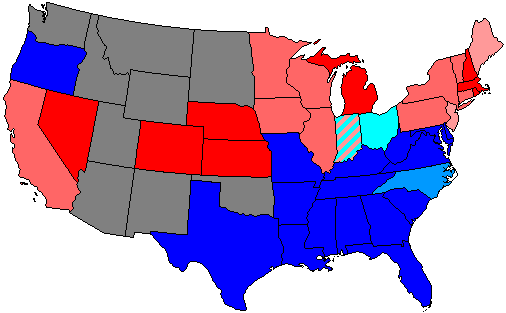
House seats by party holding plurality in state: 80+% Democratic / 80+% Republican; 60+ to 80% Democratic / 60+ to 80% Republican; Up to 60% Democratic / Up to 60% Republican

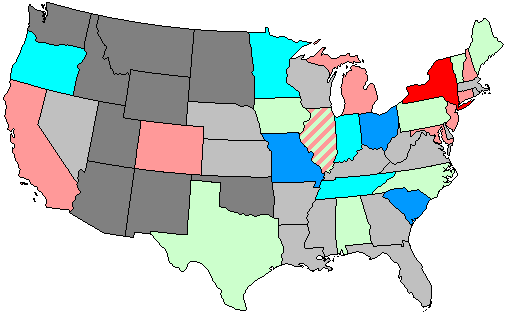
Net gain in party representation: 6+ Democratic gain / / 6+ Republican gain; 3-5 Democratic gain / / 3-5 Republican gain; 1-2 Democratic gain / 1-2 Greenback gain / 1-2 Republican gain; no net change

== Election dates ==
In most states, the elections were held November 5, 1878.

In 1845, Congress set a uniform nationwide date for choosing presidential electors. This Act of Congress did not affect election dates for Congress, which remained within the jurisdiction of state governments, but over time, the states moved their congressional elections to this date as well. In this cycle, there were still 7 states with earlier election dates, and 1 with a later election date:

- Early elections
  - June 3, 1878: Oregon
  - September 3, 1878: Vermont
  - September 9, 1878: Maine
  - October 7, 1878: Indiana
  - October 8, 1878: Iowa, Ohio, West Virginia
- Standard election date
  - November 5, 1878
- Late election
  - September 3, 1879: California

California's elections were the last time a state held congressional general elections after November.

== Special elections ==
Elections are listed by date and district.

District	Incumbent			This race	
District	Member	Party	First elected	Results	Candidates
Louisiana 5	John E. Leonard	Republican	1876	Incumbent died March 15, 1878. New member elected November 5, 1878. Democratic gain.	▌ ✓ J. Smith Young (Democratic); [data missing]
Nebraska at-large	Frank Welch	Republican	1876	Incumbent died September 4, 1878. New member elected November 5, 1878. Republican hold.	▌ ✓ Thomas J. Majors (Republican); ▌Alex Bear (Democratic); [data missing]
New York 16	Terence J. Quinn	Democratic	1876	Incumbent died June 18, 1878. New member elected November 5, 1878. Republican gain. Winner also elected to the next term; see below.	▌ ✓ John Mosher Bailey (Republican); [data missing]
Virginia 1	Beverly B. Douglas	Democratic	1874	Incumbent died December 22, 1878. New member elected January 23, 1879. Democratic hold.	▌ ✓ Richard L. T. Beale (Democratic); [data missing]
Georgia 1	Julian Hartridge	Democratic	1874	Incumbent died January 8, 1879. New member elected and seated February 10, 1879. Democratic hold.	▌ ✓ William B. Fleming (Democratic); [data missing]
Texas 6	Gustav Schleicher	Democratic	1874	Incumbent died January 10, 1879. New member elected and seated April 15, 1879. Democratic hold.	▌ ✓ Christopher C. Upson (Democratic); [data missing]
Iowa 5	Rush Clark	Republican	1876	Incumbent died April 29, 1879. New member elected October 14, 1879. Republican hold.	▌ ✓ William G. Thompson (Republican); [data missing]
New York 12	Alexander Smith	Republican	1878	Member-elect died November 5, 1878. New member elected November 4, 1879. Democratic gain.	▌ ✓ Waldo Hutchins (Democratic); [data missing]

== Alabama ==
District	Incumbent			This race	
District	Member	Party	First elected	Results	Candidates
Alabama 1	James T. Jones	Democratic	1876	Incumbent lost renomination. Democratic hold.	▌ ✓ Thomas H. Herndon (Democratic) 69.10%; ▌Warner Bailey (Greenback) 30.90%
Alabama 2	Hilary A. Herbert	Democratic	1876	Incumbent re-elected.	▌ ✓ Hilary A. Herbert (Democratic) 56.25%; ▌James P. Armstrong (Republican) 43.75%
Alabama 3	Jeremiah N. Williams	Democratic	1874	Incumbent retired. Democratic hold.	▌ ✓ William J. Samford (Democratic) 88.43%; ▌French Strange (Independent) 9.64%; ▌William M. Russell (Republican) 1.93%
Alabama 4	Charles M. Shelley	Democratic	1876	Incumbent re-elected.	▌ ✓ Charles M. Shelley (Democratic) 55.38%; ▌Jeremiah Haralson (Republican) 42.57%; ▌Jonathan H. Henry (Independent) 2.04%
Alabama 5	Robert F. Ligon	Democratic	1876	Incumbent retired. Democratic hold.	▌ ✓ Thomas Williams (Democratic) 70.51%; ▌Theodore Nunn (Greenback) 29.49%
Alabama 6	Goldsmith W. Hewitt	Democratic	1874	Incumbent retired. Democratic hold.	▌ ✓ Burwell B. Lewis (Democratic) 70.51%; ▌William R. Smith (Independent) 29.49%
Alabama 7	William H. Forney	Democratic	1874	Incumbent re-elected.	▌ ✓ William H. Forney (Democratic) 96.57%; ▌N. B. Mardis (Independent) 3.43%
Alabama 8	William W. Garth	Democratic	1874	Incumbent lost re-election. Greenback gain.	▌ ✓ William M. Lowe (Greenback) 55.49%; ▌William W. Garth (Democratic) 44.51%

== Arkansas ==
District	Incumbent			This race	
District	Member	Party	First elected	Results	Candidates
Arkansas 1	Lucien C. Gause	Democratic	1874	Incumbent retired. Democratic hold.	▌ ✓ Poindexter Dunn (Democratic) 100.0%
Arkansas 2	William F. Slemons	Democratic	1874	Incumbent re-elected.	▌ ✓ William F. Slemons (Democratic) 57.20%; ▌John G. Bradley (Greenback) 43.80%
Arkansas 3	Jordan E. Cravens	Independent; Democratic	1876	Incumbent re-elected as a Democrat. Democratic gain.	▌ ✓ Jordan E. Cravens (Democratic) 51.19%; ▌Milton L. Rice (Greenback) 48.81%
Arkansas 4	Thomas M. Gunter	Democratic	1874	Incumbent re-elected.	▌ ✓ Thomas M. Gunter (Democratic) 59.77%; ▌J. F. Cunningham (Ind. Democratic) 29.42%; ▌Byrd Smith (Greenback) 10.80%

== California ==
District	Incumbent			This race	
District	Member	Party	First elected	Results	Candidates
California 1	Horace Davis	Republican	1876	Incumbent re-elected.	▌ ✓ Horace Davis (Republican) 48.41%; ▌Clitus Barbour (Workingmen) 44.50%; ▌Charles R. Summer (Democratic) 7.09%
California 2	Horace F. Page	Republican	1872	Incumbent re-elected.	▌ ✓ Horace F. Page (Republican) 51.87%; ▌Thomas J. Clunie (Democratic) 34.38%; ▌H. P. Williams (Workingmen) 13.75%
California 3	John K. Luttrell	Democratic	1872	Incumbent retired. Democratic hold.	▌ ✓ Campbell P. Berry (Democratic) 50.16%; ▌Joseph McKenna (Republican) 49.61%; ▌George T. Elliott (Workingmen) 0.23%
California 4	Romualdo Pacheco	Republican	1876	Incumbent re-elected.	▌ ✓ Romualdo Pacheco (Republican) 40.47%; ▌Wallace Leach (Democratic) 31.84%; ▌James J. Ayers (Workingmen) 27.68%

== Colorado ==
District	Incumbent			This race	
District	Member	Party	First elected	Results	Candidates
Colorado at-large	None			New state. Republican gain.	▌ ✓ James B. Belford (Republican) 49.93%; ▌Thomas M. Patterson (Democratic) 41.93%; ▌Henry C. Childs (Greenback) 8.14%

Patterson successfully contested the election and was seated March 4, 1877.

== Connecticut ==
District	Incumbent			This race	
District	Member	Party	First elected	Results	Candidates
Connecticut 1	George M. Landers	Democratic	1875	Incumbent lost re-election. Republican gain.	▌ ✓ Joseph R. Hawley (Republican) 52.2%; ▌George M. Landers (Democratic) 43.8%; ▌Herbert Baker (Greenback) 3.7%; ▌Horace Johnson (Prohibition) 0.3%
Connecticut 2	James Phelps	Democratic	1875	Incumbent re-elected.	▌ ✓ James Phelps (Democratic) 53.2%; ▌Benjamin Douglas (Republican) 45.9%; ▌Calvin Harrington (Prohibition) 0.9%
Connecticut 3	John T. Wait	Republican	1876	Incumbent re-elected.	▌ ✓ John T. Wait (Republican) 53.7%; ▌Charles W. Carter (Republican) 44.1%; ▌Elisha Palmer (Prohibition) 2.2%
Connecticut 4	Levi Warner	Democratic	1876	Incumbent retired. Republican gain.	▌ ✓ Frederick Miles (Republican) 48.7%; ▌Frederick W. Bruggerhoff (Republican) 44.6%; ▌James S. Taylor (Greenback) 6.3%; ▌Ambrose S. Rogers (Prohibition) 0.3%

== Delaware ==
District	Incumbent			This race	
District	Member	Party	First elected	Results	Candidates
Delaware at-large	James Williams	Democratic	1874	Incumbent retired. Democratic hold.	▌ ✓ Edward L. Martin (Democratic) 78.10%; ▌John G. Jackson (Greenback) 21.90%

== Florida ==
District	Incumbent			This race	
District	Member	Party	First elected	Results	Candidates
Florida 1	Robert H. M. Davidson	Democratic	1876	Incumbent re-elected.	▌ ✓ Robert H. M. Davidson (Democratic) 56.80%; ▌Simon B. Conover (Republican) 40.90%; ▌Edmund C. Weeks (Ind. Republican) 2.29%
Florida 2	Horatio Bisbee Jr.	Republican	1876	Incumbent lost re-election. Democratic gain.	▌ ✓ Noble A. Hull (Democratic) 50.03%; ▌Horatio Bisbee Jr. (Republican) 49.97%

In the 2nd district the difference between the two candidates, in the initial returns, was just 22 votes. Bisbee challenged Hull's election, and was eventually awarded the seat on January 22, 1881.

== Georgia ==
District	Incumbent			This race	
District	Member	Party	First elected	Results	Candidates
Georgia 1	Julian Hartridge	Democratic	1874	Incumbent retired. Democratic hold.	▌ ✓ John C. Nicholls (Democratic) 62.76%; ▌S. A. Corker (Republican) 37.24%
Georgia 2	William E. Smith	Democratic	1874	Incumbent re-elected.	▌ ✓ William E. Smith (Democratic) 69.05%; ▌E. C. Wade (Republican) 30.95%
Georgia 3	Philip Cook	Democratic	1872	Incumbent re-elected.	▌ ✓ Philip Cook (Democratic) 100.0%
Georgia 4	Henry R. Harris	Democratic	1872	Incumbent lost re-election. Independent Democratic gain.	▌ ✓ Henry Persons (Ind. Democratic) 56.09%; ▌Henry R. Harris (Democratic) 42.48%; ▌L. J. Milam (Independent) 0.91%; ▌J. C. Fuller (Independent) 0.51%
Georgia 5	Milton A. Candler	Democratic	1874	Incumbent retired. Democratic hold.	▌ ✓ Nathaniel J. Hammond (Democratic) 55.64%; ▌Reuben Arnold (Greenback) 44.36%
Georgia 6	James H. Blount	Democratic	1872	Incumbent re-elected.	▌ ✓ James H. Blount (Democratic) 99.44%; ▌Scattering (Independent) 0.56%
Georgia 7	William H. Felton	Independent; Democratic	1874	Incumbent re-elected.	▌ ✓ William H. Felton (Ind. Democratic) 52.47%; ▌G. N. Lester (Democratic) 47.53%
Georgia 8	Alexander H. Stephens	Democratic	1872	Incumbent re-elected.	▌ ✓ Alexander H. Stephens (Democratic) 98.30%; ▌Scattering (Independent) 1.70%
Georgia 9	Hiram P. Bell	Democratic	1877	Incumbent lost renomination. Independent Democratic gain.	▌ ✓ Emory Speer (Ind. Democratic) 50.51%; ▌Joel A. Billups (Democratic) 49.49%

== Illinois ==
District	Incumbent			This race	
District	Member	Party	First elected	Results	Candidates
Illinois 1	William Aldrich	Republican	1876	Incumbent re-elected.	▌ ✓ William Aldrich (Republican) 51.84%; ▌James R. Doolittle (Democratic) 30.41%; ▌John McAscliff (Socialist Labor) 9.89%; ▌William V. Barr (Greenback) 7.86%
Illinois 2	Carter Harrison Sr.	Democratic	1874	Incumbent retired to run for Mayor of Chicago. Republican gain.	▌ ✓ George R. Davis (Republican) 49.59%; ▌Miles Kehoe (Democratic) 29.29%; ▌George A. Schilling (Socialist Labor) 11.85%; ▌James Felch (Greenback) 7.67%; ▌J. H. Condon (Independent) 1.25%; ▌John Sebolski (Independent) 0.35%
Illinois 3	Lorenzo Brentano	Republican	1876	Incumbent lost re-nomination. Republican hold.	▌ ✓ Hiram Barber Jr. (Republican) 53.06%; ▌Lambert Tree (Democratic) 29.26%; ▌Benjamin Sebley (Independent) 12.78%; ▌A. B. Cornell (Greenback) 4.90%
Illinois 4	William Lathrop	Republican	1876	Incumbent retired. Republican hold.	▌ ✓ John C. Sherwin (Republican) 61.79%; ▌Jonathan C. Staighton (Democratic) 21.50%; ▌Augustus Adams (Greenback) 16.71%
Illinois 5	Horatio C. Burchard	Republican	1869 (special)	Incumbent lost re-nomination. Republican hold.	▌ ✓ Robert M. A. Hawk (Republican) 53.42%; ▌Mortimer D. Hathaway (Democratic) 23.33%; ▌John M. King (Greenback) 23.24%
Illinois 6	Thomas J. Henderson	Republican	1874	Incumbent re-elected.	▌ ✓ Thomas J. Henderson (Republican) 52.47%; ▌James W. Haney (Greenback) 31.94%; ▌Charles Dunham (Democratic) 15.59%
Illinois 7	Philip C. Hayes	Republican	1876	Incumbent re-elected.	▌ ✓ Philip C. Hayes (Republican) 46.54%; ▌Alexander Campbell (Greenback) 28.29%; ▌W. S. Brooks (Democratic) 25.17%
Illinois 8	Greenbury L. Fort	Republican	1872	Incumbent re-elected.	▌ ✓ Greenbury L. Fort (Republican) 49.72%; ▌Chris C. Strawn (Greenback) 29.01%; ▌Thomas M. Shaw (Democratic) 21.27%
Illinois 9	Thomas A. Boyd	Republican	1876	Incumbent re-elected.	▌ ✓ Thomas A. Boyd (Republican) 43.76%; ▌George A. Wilson (Democratic) 40.68%; ▌Aloxr H. Keighan (Greenback) 15.56%
Illinois 10	Benjamin F. Marsh	Republican	1876	Incumbent re-elected.	▌ ✓ Benjamin F. Marsh (Republican) 44.50%; ▌Delos P. Phelps (Democratic) 42.33%; ▌Alson J. Streeter (Greenback) 13.17%
Illinois 11	Robert M. Knapp	Democratic	1876	Incumbent lost renomination. Democratic hold.	▌ ✓ James W. Singleton (Democratic) 54.49%; ▌James P. Dimmitt (Republican) 31.69%; ▌William H. Pogue (Prohibition) 13.82%
Illinois 12	William M. Springer	Democratic	1874	Incumbent re-elected.	▌ ✓ William M. Springer (Democratic) 47.69%; ▌John Cook (Republican) 34.78%; ▌John Mathers (Greenback) 17.53%
Illinois 13	Thomas F. Tipton	Republican	1876	Incumbent lost re-election. Democratic gain.	▌ ✓ Adlai Stevenson I (Democratic) 53.22%; ▌Thomas F. Tipton (Republican) 46.26%; ▌L. M. Bickmore (Prohibition) 0.52%
Illinois 14	Joseph G. Cannon	Republican	1872	Incumbent re-elected.	▌ ✓ Joseph G. Cannon (Republican) 46.16%; ▌Maldon Jones (Democratic) 38.84%; ▌Jesse Harper (Greenback) 15.00%
Illinois 15	John R. Eden	Democratic	1872	Incumbent lost renomination Greenback gain.	▌ ✓ Albert P. Forsythe (Greenback) 50.31%; ▌Hiram B. Decias (Democratic) 49.69%
Illinois 16	William A. J. Sparks	Democratic	1874	Incumbent re-elected.	▌ ✓ William A. J. Sparks (Democratic) 48.75%; ▌Basil B. Smith (Republican) 42.18%; ▌James Creed (Greenback) 9.07%
Illinois 17	William R. Morrison	Democratic	1862	Incumbent re-elected.	▌ ✓ William R. Morrison (Democratic) 50.47%; ▌John Baker (Republican) 43.04%; ▌William E. Moberly (Greenback) 6.48%
Illinois 18	William Hartzell	Democratic	1874	Incumbent retired. Republican gain.	▌ ✓ John R. Thomas (Republican) 46.62%; ▌William J. Allen (Democratic) 44.37%; ▌S. J. Davis (Greenback) 9.02%
Illinois 19	Richard W. Townshend	Democratic	1876	Incumbent re-elected.	▌ ✓ Richard W. Townshend (Democratic) 53.31%; ▌Robert Bell (Republican) 34.64%; ▌Seth F. Crews (Greenback) 12.04%

== Indiana ==
District	Incumbent			This race	
District	Member	Party	First elected	Results	Candidates
Indiana 1	Benoni S. Fuller	Democratic	1874	Incumbent retired. Republican gain.	▌ ✓ William Heilman (Republican) 48.66%; ▌Thomas E. Garvin (Democratic) 45.77%; ▌Thomas F. Debruler (Greenback) 5.57%
Indiana 2	Thomas R. Cobb	Democratic	1876	Incumbent re-elected.	▌ ✓ Thomas R. Cobb (Democratic) 55.06%; ▌Richard M. Welman (Republican) 38.26%; ▌William L. Green (Greenback) 6.69%
Indiana 3	George A. Bicknell	Democratic	1876	Incumbent re-elected.	▌ ✓ George A. Bicknell (Democratic) 57.91%; ▌Ara E. Long (Republican) 35.99%; ▌John F. Willy (Greenback) 6.10%
Indiana 4	Leonidas Sexton	Republican	1876	Incumbent lost re-election. Democratic gain.	▌ ✓ Jeptha D. New (Democratic) 50.49%; ▌Leonidas Sexton (Republican) 48.85%; ▌Robert Gregg (Greenback) 0.66%
Indiana 5	Thomas M. Browne	Republican	1876	Incumbent re-elected.	▌ ✓ Thomas M. Browne (Republican) 50.08%; ▌William S. Holman (Democratic) 47.03%; ▌William C. Jeffries (Greenback) 2.89%
Indiana 6	Milton S. Robinson	Republican	1874	Incumbent retired. Democratic gain.	▌ ✓ William R. Myers (Democratic) 47.89%; ▌William Grose (Republican) 46.06%; ▌Reuben A. Riley (Greenback) 6.05%
Indiana 7	John Hanna	Republican	1876	Incumbent lost re-election. Greenback gain.	▌ ✓ Gilbert De La Matyr (Greenback) (Note: also endorsed by the Democrats) 51.14%; ▌John Hanna (Republican) 48.86%
Indiana 8	Morton C. Hunter	Republican	1872	Incumbent lost re-election. Democratic gain.	▌ ✓ Abraham J. Hostetler (Democratic) 43.56%; ▌Morton C. Hunter (Republican) 40.12%; ▌Henry A. White (Greenback) 16.31%
Indiana 9	Michael D. White	Republican	1876	Incumbent retired. Republican hold.	▌ ✓ Godlove S. Orth (Republican) 43.73%; ▌James McCabe (Democratic) 43.46%; ▌Leroy Templeton (Greenback) 12.81%
Indiana 10	William H. Calkins	Republican	1876	Incumbent re-elected.	▌ ✓ William H. Calkins (Republican) 45.16%; ▌Morgan H. Weir (Democratic) 39.41%; ▌John N. Skinner (Greenback) 15.44%
Indiana 11	James L. Evans	Republican	1874	Incumbent retired. Republican hold.	▌ ✓ Calvin Cowgill (Republican) 47.23%; ▌David D. Dykeman (Democratic) 39.81%; ▌David Moss (Greenback) 12.96%
Indiana 12	Andrew H. Hamilton	Democratic	1874	Incumbent retired. Democratic hold.	▌ ✓ Walpole G. Colerick (Democratic) 63.73%; ▌John Studebaker (Republican/Greenback) 36.27%
Indiana 13	John Baker	Republican	1874	Incumbent re-elected.	▌ ✓ John Baker (Republican) 47.20%; ▌John B. Stoll (Democratic) 42.04%; ▌William C. Williams (Greenback) 10.76%

== Iowa ==
District	Incumbent			This race	
District	Member	Party	First elected	Results	Candidates
Iowa 1	Joseph C. Stone	Republican	1876	Incumbent lost renomination Republican hold.	▌ ✓ Moses A. McCoid (Republican) 48.58%; ▌Wesley C. Hobbs (Democratic) 30.38%; ▌A. H. Breman (Greenback) 21.05%
Iowa 2	Hiram Price	Republican	1876	Incumbent re-elected.	▌ ✓ Hiram Price (Republican) 49.75%; ▌W. F. Brannan (Democratic) 35.47%; ▌Jacob Geiger (Greenback) 14.77%
Iowa 3	Theodore W. Burdick	Republican	1876	Incumbent retired. Republican hold.	▌ ✓ Thomas Updegraff (Republican) 43.85%; ▌Fred O'Donnell (Democratic) 37.52%; ▌S. T. Spangler (Greenback) 18.63%
Iowa 4	Nathaniel C. Deering	Republican	1876	Incumbent re-elected.	▌ ✓ Nathaniel C. Deering (Republican) 60.83%; ▌Luman H. Weller (Greenback) 20.38%; ▌William V. Allen (Democratic) 18.79%
Iowa 5	Rush Clark	Republican	1876	Incumbent re-elected.	▌ ✓ Rush Clark (Republican) 52.78%; ▌George Carter (Democratic) 44.63%; ▌Timothy Brown (Greenback) 2.59%
Iowa 6	Ezekiel S. Sampson	Republican	1874	Incumbent lost re-election. Greenback gain.	▌ ✓ James B. Weaver (Greenback) 53.35%; ▌Ezekiel S. Sampson (Republican) 46.65%
Iowa 7	Henry J. B. Cummings	Republican	1876	Incumbent lost re-election. Greenback gain.	▌ ✓ Edward H. Gillette (Greenback) 51.45%; ▌Henry J. B. Cummings (Republican) 48.55%
Iowa 8	William F. Sapp	Republican	1876	Incumbent re-elected.	▌ ✓ William F. Sapp (Republican) 50.21%; ▌George C. Hicks (Greenback) 25.40%; ▌John H. Keatley (Democratic) 24.39%
Iowa 9	S. Addison Oliver	Republican	1874	Incumbent retired. Republican hold.	▌ ✓ Cyrus C. Carpenter (Republican) 54.91%; ▌L. Q. Hoggartt (Greenback) 41.08%; ▌Walter Brown (Democratic) 4.00%

== Kansas ==
District	Incumbent			This race	
District	Member	Party	First elected	Results	Candidates
Kansas 1	William A. Phillips	Republican	1872	Incumbent lost renomination Republican hold.	▌ ✓ John A. Anderson (Republican) 59.61%; ▌J. R. McClure (Democratic) 29.20%; ▌E. Gale (Greenback) 11.19%
Kansas 2	Dudley C. Haskell	Republican	1876	Incumbent re-elected.	▌ ✓ Dudley C. Haskell (Republican) 44.97%; ▌C. W. Blair (Democratic) 31.40%; ▌P. P. Elder (Greenback) 23.54%
Kansas 3	Thomas Ryan	Republican	1876	Incumbent re-elected.	▌ ✓ Thomas Ryan (Republican) 56.83%; ▌F. Doser (Greenback) 24.90%; ▌J. B. Fugate (Democratic) 18.27%

== Kentucky ==
District	Incumbent			This race	
District	Member	Party	First elected	Results	Candidates
Kentucky 1	Andrew Boone	Democratic	1874	Incumbent retired. Independent Democratic gain.	▌ ✓ Oscar Turner (Ind. Democratic) 42.87%; ▌Lawrence S. Trimble (Democratic) 34.97%; ▌E. W. Bagby (Republican) 22.15%
Kentucky 2	James A. McKenzie	Democratic	1876	Incumbent re-elected.	▌ ✓ James A. McKenzie (Democratic) 61.38%; ▌John W. Feighan (Republican) 23.50%; ▌Francis M. English (Greenback) 15.12%
Kentucky 3	John W. Caldwell	Democratic	1876	Incumbent re-elected.	▌ ✓ John W. Caldwell (Democratic) 46.32%; ▌W. Godfrey Hunter (Republican) 42.10%; ▌George Wright (Greenback) 11.58%
Kentucky 4	J. Proctor Knott	Democratic	1874	Incumbent re-elected.	▌ ✓ J. Proctor Knott (Democratic) 65.04%; ▌J. D. Belden (Republican) 33.48%; ▌John W. Lewis (Greenback) 1.48%
Kentucky 5	Albert S. Willis	Democratic	1876	Incumbent re-elected.	▌ ✓ Albert S. Willis (Democratic) 40.51%; ▌J. Watts Kearney (Democratic) 33.30%; ▌Horace Scott (Republican) 24.48%; ▌Blanton Duncan (Greenback) 1.70%
Kentucky 6	John G. Carlisle	Democratic	1876	Incumbent re-elected.	▌ ✓ John G. Carlisle (Democratic) 75.87%; ▌Joseph H. Hermes (Independent) 24.13%
Kentucky 7	J. C. S. Blackburn	Democratic	1874	Incumbent re-elected.	▌ ✓ J. C. S. Blackburn (Democratic) 69.78%; ▌George C. Drane (Republican) 28.68%; ▌John L. Scott (Independent) 1.54%
Kentucky 8	Milton J. Durham	Democratic	1872	Incumbent lost renomination. Democratic hold.	▌ ✓ Philip B. Thompson Jr. (Democratic) 53.80%; ▌George Denny (Republican) 46.20%
Kentucky 9	Thomas Turner	Democratic	1876	Incumbent re-elected.	▌ ✓ Thomas Turner (Democratic) 55.45%; ▌John Dills (Republican) 43.15%; ▌James G. Carter (Greenback) 1.40%
Kentucky 10	John B. Clarke	Democratic	1874	Incumbent retired. Democratic hold.	▌ ✓ Elijah Phister (Democratic) 65.34%; ▌B. F. Bennett (Republican) 23.70%; ▌James Kilgore (Greenback) 10.97%

== Louisiana ==
District	Incumbent			This race	
District	Member	Party	First elected	Results	Candidates
Louisiana 1	Randall L. Gibson	Democratic	1874	Incumbent re-elected.	▌ ✓ Randall L. Gibson (Democratic) 63.60%; ▌H. C. Castellanos (Republican) 36.40%
Louisiana 2	E. John Ellis	Democratic	1874	Incumbent re-elected.	▌ ✓ E. John Ellis (Democratic) 58.97%; ▌E. N. Collom (Greenback) 34.91%; ▌Michael Hahn (Republican) 6.12%
Louisiana 3	Joseph H. Acklen	Democratic	1876	Incumbent re-elected.	▌ ✓ Joseph H. Acklen (Democratic) 48.77%; ▌R. O. Herbert (Republican) 33.89%; ▌W. B. Merchant (Independent Democratic) 17.34%
Louisiana 4	Joseph B. Elam	Democratic	1876	Incumbent re-elected.	▌ ✓ Joseph B. Elam (Democratic) 89.15%; ▌J. M. Wells (Republican) 10.85%
Louisiana 5	J. Smith Young	Democratic	1878	Incumbent retired. Democratic hold.	▌ ✓ J. Floyd King (Democratic) 77.87%; ▌J. T. Ludling (Republican) 22.13%
Louisiana 6	Edward W. Robertson	Democratic	1876	Incumbent re-elected.	▌ ✓ Edward W. Robertson (Democratic) 66.14%; ▌W. L. Larimore (Independent) 33.86%

== Maine ==
District	Incumbent			This race	
District	Member	Party	First elected	Results	Candidates
Maine 1	Thomas B. Reed	Republican	1876	Incumbent re-elected.	▌ ✓ Thomas B. Reed (Republican) 46.23%; ▌Samuel J. Anderson (Democratic) 32.00%; ▌Edward H. Gove (Greenback) 21.77%
Maine 2	William P. Frye	Republican	1870	Incumbent re-elected.	▌ ✓ William P. Frye (Republican) 49.20%; ▌Solon Chase (Greenback) 36.46%; ▌S. Clifford Belcher (Democratic) 14.34%
Maine 3	Stephen Lindsey	Republican	1876	Incumbent re-elected.	▌ ✓ Stephen Lindsey (Republican) 44.39%; ▌William Philbrick (Greenback) 32.60%; ▌Franklin Smith (Democratic) 23.01%
Maine 4	Llewellyn Powers	Republican	1876	Incumbent lost re-election. Greenback gain.	▌ ✓ George W. Ladd (Greenback) 56.14%; ▌Llewellyn Powers (Republican) 43.86%
Maine 5	Eugene Hale	Republican	1868	Incumbent lost re-election. Greenback gain.	▌ ✓ Thompson H. Murch (Greenback) 48.43%; ▌Eugene Hale (Republican) 42.28%; ▌Joseph H. Martin (Democratic) 9.29%

== Maryland ==
District	Incumbent			This race	
District	Member	Party	First elected	Results	Candidates
Maryland 1	Daniel M. Henry	Democratic	1876	Incumbent re-elected.	▌ ✓ Daniel M. Henry (Democratic) 52.49%; ▌Samuel A. Graham (Republican) 47.51%
Maryland 2	Charles B. Roberts	Democratic	1874	Incumbent retired. Democratic hold.	▌ ✓ J. Frederick C. Talbott (Democratic) 66.87%; ▌George B. Milligan (Ind. Democratic) 24.48%; ▌A. P. McCombs (Greenback) 8.66%
Maryland 3	William Kimmel	Democratic	1876	Incumbent re-elected.	▌ ✓ William Kimmel (Democratic) 70.41%; ▌Joseph Thompson (Labor) (Note: Also endorsed by the Greenbacks) 29.59%
Maryland 4	Thomas Swann	Democratic	1868	Incumbent retired. Democratic hold.	▌ ✓ Robert M. McLane (Democratic) 58.98%; ▌Jonathan C. Holland (Republican) 35.56%; ▌William L. Quigley (Labor) 3.34%
Maryland 5	Eli J. Henkle	Democratic	1874	Incumbent re-elected.	▌ ✓ Eli J. Henkle (Democratic) 53.97%; ▌J. Parran Crane (Republican) 45.20%; ▌Eugene B. Calvert (Greenback) 0.84%
Maryland 6	William Walsh	Democratic	1874	Incumbent retired. Republican gain.	▌ ✓ Milton Urner (Republican) 49.69%; ▌George Peter (Democratic) 43.62%; ▌Horace Resley (Greenback) 6.69%

== Massachusetts ==
District	Incumbent			This race	
District	Member	Party	First elected	Results	Candidates
Massachusetts 1	William W. Crapo	Republican	1874	Incumbent re-elected.	▌ ✓ William W. Crapo (Republican) 62.32%; ▌Matthias Ellis (Democratic) 36.59%; ▌Rodney French (Prohibition) 1.09%
Massachusetts 2	Benjamin W. Harris	Republican	1872	Incumbent re-elected.	▌ ✓ Benjamin W. Harris (Republican) 58.75%; ▌Edgar E. Dean (Greenback) 22.05%; ▌Edward Avery (Democratic) 17.63%; ▌Thomas J. Lothrop (Prohibition) 1.58%
Massachusetts 3	Benjamin Dean	Democratic	1876	Incumbent lost re-election. Republican gain.	▌ ✓ Walbridge A. Field (Republican) 51.03%; ▌Benjamin Dean (Democratic) 48.97%
Massachusetts 4	Leopold Morse	Democratic	1876	Incumbent re-elected.	▌ ✓ Leopold Morse (Democratic) 60.34%; ▌Martin Brimmer (Republican) 39.66%
Massachusetts 5	Nathaniel P. Banks	Republican	1874	Incumbent lost renomination. Republican hold.	▌ ✓ Selwyn Z. Bowman (Republican) 58.37%; ▌▌Nathan Clark (Democratic) 41.63%
Massachusetts 6	George B. Loring	Republican	1876	Incumbent re-elected.	▌ ✓ George B. Loring (Republican) 44.52%; ▌E. Moody Boynton (Greenback) 44.03%; ▌James H. Carleton (Democratic) 11.45%
Massachusetts 7	Benjamin Butler	Republican	1876	Incumbent retired to run for governor. Republican hold.	▌ ✓ William A. Russell (Republican) 55.23%; ▌John K. Tarbox (Democratic) 32.29%; ▌Samuel M. Stevens (Greenback) 11.87%; ▌James G. Abbott (Prohibition) 0.60%
Massachusetts 8	William Claflin	Republican	1876	Incumbent re-elected.	▌ ✓ William Claflin (Republican) 54.41%; ▌Isaac Bradford (Democratic) 44.74%; ▌George W. Stacey (Prohibition) 0.85%
Massachusetts 9	William W. Rice	Republican	1876	Incumbent re-elected.	▌ ✓ William W. Rice (Republican) 59.02%; ▌Eli Thayer (Democratic) 39.78%; ▌T. A. Smith (Prohibition) 1.18%
Massachusetts 10	Amasa Norcross	Republican	1876	Incumbent re-elected.	▌ ✓ Amasa Norcross (Republican) 55.54%; ▌Wilbur F. Whitney (Greenback) 29.10%; ▌James S. Grinnell (Democratic) 15.36%
Massachusetts 11	George D. Robinson	Republican	1876	Incumbent re-elected.	▌ ✓ George D. Robinson (Republican) 51.75%; ▌▌Edward H. Lathrop (Democratic) 37.86%; ▌Jarvis N. Dunham (Democratic) 9.80%; ▌Albert C. Woodworth (Independent) 0.60%

== Michigan ==
District	Incumbent			This race	
District	Member	Party	First elected	Results	Candidates
Michigan 1	Alpheus S. Williams	Democratic	1874	Incumbent lost re-election. Republican gain.	▌ ✓ John S. Newberry (Republican) 40.85%; ▌Alpheus S. Williams (Democratic) 35.37%; ▌John Heffron (Greenback) 23.78%; ▌Arthur D. Power (Prohibition) 0.22%
Michigan 2	Edwin Willits	Republican	1876	Incumbent re-elected.	▌ ✓ Edwin Willits (Republican) 40.85%; ▌Ira B. Card (Democratic) 29.71%; ▌Levi H. Thomas (Greenback) 24.07%; ▌A. H. Lowie (Prohibition) 1.73%
Michigan 3	Jonas H. McGowan	Republican	1876	Incumbent re-elected.	▌ ✓ Jonas H. McGowan (Republican) 41.68%; ▌John Dawson (Greenback) 35.78%; ▌James S. Upton (Democratic) 18.38%; ▌Samuel Dickie (Prohibition) 4.16%
Michigan 4	Edwin W. Keightley	Republican	1876	Incumbent retired. Republican hold.	▌ ✓ Julius C. Burrows (Republican) 47.14%; ▌Andrew J. Eldred (Democratic) 27.06%; ▌Thomas R. Sherwood (Greenback) 25.80%
Michigan 5	John W. Stone	Republican	1876	Incumbent re-elected.	▌ ✓ John W. Stone (Republican) 45.77%; ▌Charles C. Comstock (Greenback) 43.73%; ▌Hiram J. Hoyt (Democratic) 9.93%; ▌Dennis Dreskell (Prohibition) 0.57%
Michigan 6	Mark S. Brewer	Republican	1876	Incumbent re-elected.	▌ ✓ Mark S. Brewer (Republican) 45.10%; ▌Hugh McCurdy (Democratic) 37.99%; ▌James I. Meade (Greenback) 15.32%; ▌M. M. Burnham (Prohibition) 1.59%
Michigan 7	Omar D. Conger	Republican	1868	Incumbent re-elected.	▌ ✓ Omar D. Conger (Republican) 47.39%; ▌William T. Mitchell (Democratic) 35.48%; ▌Charles F. Mallory (Greenback) 17.13%
Michigan 8	Charles C. Ellsworth	Republican	1876	Incumbent retired. Republican hold.	▌ ✓ Roswell G. Horr (Republican) 39.72%; ▌B. M. Thompson (Democratic) 31.70%; ▌Herbert M. Hoyt (Greenback) 28.15%
Michigan 9	Jay A. Hubbell	Republican	1872	Incumbent re-elected.	▌ ✓ Jay A. Hubbell (Republican) 53.08%; ▌John Powers (Democratic) 26.01%; ▌George Parmelee (Greenback) 20.91%

== Minnesota ==
District	Incumbent			This race	
District	Member	Party	First elected	Results	Candidates
Minnesota 1	Mark H. Dunnell	Republican	1870	Incumbent re-elected.	▌ ✓ Mark H. Dunnell (Republican) 57.48%; ▌William Meighan (Democratic) 39.66%; ▌George W. Green (Prohibition) 2.86%
Minnesota 2	Horace B. Strait	Republican	1872	Incumbent lost re-election. Democratic gain.	▌ ✓ Henry Poehler (Democratic) 50.01%; ▌Horace B. Strait (Republican) 47.50%; ▌George C. Chamberlain (Greenback) 2.06%; ▌Isaac C. Stearns (Prohibition) 0.43%
Minnesota 3	Jacob H. Stewart	Republican	1876	Incumbent retired. Republican hold.	▌ ✓ William D. Washburn (Republican) 53.88%; ▌Ignatius L. Donnelly (Democratic) 46.12%

== Mississippi ==
District	Incumbent			This race	
District	Member	Party	First elected	Results	Candidates
Mississippi 1	Henry L. Muldrow	Democratic	1876	Incumbent re-elected.	▌ ✓ Henry L. Muldrow (Democratic) 59.35%; ▌Reuben Davis (Greenback) 40.25%; ▌W. D. Frazee (Independent) 0.40%
Mississippi 2	Van. H. Manning	Democratic	1876	Incumbent re-elected.	▌ ✓ Van. H. Manning (Democratic) 52.02%; ▌J. H. Amacker (Republican) 44.94%; ▌C. H. Allen (Independent) 2.88%; ▌Daniel B. Wright (Greenback) 0.16%
Mississippi 3	Hernando Money	Democratic	1874	Incumbent re-elected.	▌ ✓ Hernando Money (Democratic) 100.0%
Mississippi 4	Otho R. Singleton	Democratic	1874	Incumbent re-elected.	▌ ✓ Otho R. Singleton (Democratic) 100.0%
Mississippi 5	Charles E. Hooker	Democratic	1874	Incumbent re-elected.	▌ ✓ Charles E. Hooker (Democratic) 87.53%; ▌J. B. Deason (Republican) 12.47%
Mississippi 6	James R. Chalmers	Democratic	1876	Incumbent re-elected.	▌ ✓ James R. Chalmers (Democratic) 83.26%; ▌E. J. Castello (Republican) 16.74%

== Missouri ==
District	Incumbent			This race	
District	Member	Party	First elected	Results	Candidates
Missouri 1	Anthony F. Ittner	Republican	1876	Incumbent retired. Democratic gain.	▌ ✓ Martin L. Clardy (Democratic) 48.36%; ▌Henry Ziegenhein (Republican) 33.26%; ▌Henry Eshbaugh (Greenback) 12.69%; ▌F. Westermeyer (Socialist Labor) 5.69%
Missouri 2	Nathan Cole	Republican	1876	Incumbent lost re-election. Democratic gain.	▌ ✓ Erastus Wells (Democratic) 42.70%; ▌Nathan Cole (Republican) 41.21%; ▌John Hogan (Greenback) 13.31%; ▌William Hossfield (Socialist Labor) 2.78%
Missouri 3	Lyne Metcalfe	Republican	1876	Incumbent lost re-election. Democratic gain.	▌ ✓ R. Graham Frost (Democratic) 45.23%; ▌Lyne Metcalfe (Republican) 33.25%; ▌H. C. Vandillen (Greenback) 13.83%; ▌G. Bartholomeus (Socialist Labor) 7.13%
Missouri 4	Robert A. Hatcher	Democratic	1872	Incumbent retired. Democratic hold.	▌ ✓ Lowndes H. Davis (Democratic) 61.35%; ▌Sol G. Kitchen (Greenback) 34.79%; ▌Charles E. Moss (Republican) 3.86%
Missouri 5	Richard P. Bland	Democratic	1872	Incumbent re-elected.	▌ ✓ Richard P. Bland (Democratic) 56.64%; ▌J. J. Ware (Greenback) 40.24%; ▌W. C. Mings (Independent) 3.11%
Missouri 6	Charles H. Morgan	Democratic	1874	Incumbent lost renomination. Democratic hold.	▌ ✓ James R. Waddill (Democratic) 43.99%; ▌Charles G. Burton (Republican) 28.77%; ▌M. H. Ritchey (Greenback) 27.24%
Missouri 7	Thomas T. Crittenden	Democratic	1876	Incumbent retired. Democratic hold.	▌ ✓ Alfred M. Lay (Democratic) 51.49%; ▌James Boyd (Greenback) 26.75%; ▌A. A. Underwood (Republican) 21.77%
Missouri 8	Benjamin J. Franklin	Democratic	1874	Incumbent retired. Independent Democratic gain.	▌ ✓ Samuel L. Sawyer (Ind. Democratic) 48.95%; ▌John T. Crisp (Democratic) 44.87%; ▌L. G. Jeffers (Greenback) 6.17%
Missouri 9	David Rea	Democratic	1874	Incumbent lost re-election. Greenback gain.	▌ ✓ Nicholas Ford (Greenback) 51.74%; ▌David Rea (Democratic) 48.26%
Missouri 10	Henry M. Pollard	Republican	1876	Incumbent lost re-election. Democratic gain.	▌ ✓ Gideon F. Rothwell (Democratic) 47.19%; ▌Henry M. Pollard (Republican) 34.69%; ▌E. J. Broaddus (Greenback) 18.12%
Missouri 11	John B. Clark Jr.	Democratic	1872	Incumbent re-elected.	▌ ✓ John B. Clark Jr. (Democratic) 98.92%; ▌Scattering (Independent) 1.08%
Missouri 12	John M. Glover	Democratic	1872	Incumbent lost renomination. Democratic hold.	▌ ✓ William H. Hatch (Democratic) 45.09%; ▌John M. London (Greenback) 38.34%; ▌Dan M. Draper (Republican) 16.56%
Missouri 13	Aylett H. Buckner	Democratic	1872	Incumbent lost renomination. Democratic hold.	▌ ✓ Aylett H. Buckner (Democratic) 59.21%; ▌T. J. Fagg (Greenback) (Note: Also endorsed by the Republicans) 32.57%; ▌T. B. Robinson (Ind. Government) 8.22%

== Nebraska ==
District	Incumbent			This race	
District	Member	Party	First elected	Results	Candidates
Nebraska at-large	Vacant due to Welch's death			Incumbent died September 4, 1878. Republican hold. (Note: Thomas Jefferson Majors, who was elected to complete Frank Welch's term in the 45th Congress, was elected as "member-contingent". He believed that Nebraska was entitled to a second congressional seat, and so was elected to fill that seat if Congress had approved it.)	▌ ✓ Edward K. Valentine (Republican) 56.58%; ▌J. W. Davis (Democratic) 43.42%

== Nevada ==
District	Incumbent			This race	
District	Member	Party	First elected	Results	Candidates
Nevada at-large	Thomas Wren	Republican	1876	Incumbent retired. Republican hold.	▌ ✓ Rollin M. Daggett (Republican) 51.81%; ▌W. E. Deal (Democratic) 48.19%

== New Hampshire ==
District	Incumbent			This race	
District	Member	Party	First elected	Results	Candidates
New Hampshire 1	Frank Jones	Democratic	1875	Incumbent retired. Republican gain.	▌ ✓ Joshua G. Hall (Republican) 50.57%; ▌Herbert F. Norris (Democratic) 40.88%; ▌Lafayette Chesley (Greenback) 8.55%
New Hampshire 2	James F. Briggs	Republican	1877	Incumbent re-elected.	▌ ✓ James F. Briggs (Republican) 52.10%; ▌Alvah W. Sulloway (Democratic) 39.57%; ▌Cyrus A. Sulloway (Greenback) 8.33%
New Hampshire 3	Henry W. Blair	Republican	1875	Incumbent elected to the U.S. Senate. Republican hold.	▌ ✓ Evarts W. Farr (Republican) 49.06%; ▌Henry O. Kent (Democratic) 44.68%; ▌James W. Johnson (Greenback) 6.27%

== New Jersey ==
District	Incumbent			This race	
District	Member	Party	First elected	Results	Candidates
New Jersey 1	Clement H. Sinnickson	Republican	1874	Incumbent retired. Republican hold.	▌ ✓ George M. Robeson (Republican) 48.11%; ▌C. C. Grosscup (Greenback) 31.85%; ▌Nathan T. Stratton (Democratic) 20.04%
New Jersey 2	John H. Pugh	Republican	1876	Incumbent lost re-election. Democratic gain.	▌ ✓ Hezekiah B. Smith (Democratic) 50.59%; ▌John H. Pugh (Republican) 47.44%; ▌Charles E. Baker (Prohibition) 1.97%
New Jersey 3	Miles Ross	Democratic	1874	Incumbent re-elected.	▌ ✓ Miles Ross (Democratic) 44.15%; ▌Amos Clark (Republican) 43.06%; ▌Washington L. Hope (Greenback) 12.56%; ▌James A. Bradley (Prohibition) 0.24%
New Jersey 4	Alvah A. Clark	Democratic	1876	Incumbent re-elected.	▌ ✓ Alvah A. Clark (Democratic) 45.05%; ▌Frederic A. Potts (Republican) 38.77%; ▌George H. Larison (Greenback) 16.18%
New Jersey 5	Augustus W. Cutler	Democratic	1874	Incumbent retired. Republican gain.	▌ ✓ Charles H. Voorhis (Republican) 44.92%; ▌Thomas W. Demarest (Democratic) 41.60%; ▌Erastus E. Potter (Greenback) 13.48%
New Jersey 6	Thomas B. Peddie	Republican	1876	Incumbent retired. Republican hold.	▌ ✓ John L. Blake (Republican) 49.72%; ▌Andrew Albright (Democratic) 43.19%; ▌Francis C. Bliss (Greenback) 7.09%
New Jersey 7	Augustus A. Hardenbergh	Democratic	1874	Incumbent retired. Republican gain.	▌ ✓ Lewis A. Brigham (Republican) 50.82%; ▌Patrick H. Laverty (Democratic) 43.26%; ▌J. B. Winant (Greenback) 5.48%; ▌C. C. Burr (Ind. Democratic) 0.44%

== New York ==
District	Incumbent			This race	
District	Member	Party	First elected	Results	Candidates
New York 1	James W. Covert	Democratic	1876	Incumbent re-elected.	▌ ✓ James W. Covert (Democratic) 50.84%; ▌James Otis (Republican) 43.44%; ▌Samuel J. Crooks (Greenback) 5.27%; ▌Egbert T. Smith (Prohibition) 0.45%
New York 2	William D. Veeder	Democratic	1876	Incumbent retired. Independent Democratic gain.	▌ ✓ Daniel O'Reilly (Ind. Democratic) 55.24%; ▌Edward C. Litchfield (Democratic) 41.54%; ▌Abraham Bennett (Greenback) 3.22%
New York 3	Simeon B. Chittenden	Republican	1874 (Special)	Incumbent re-elected.	▌ ✓ Simeon B. Chittenden (Republican) 58.40%; ▌Richard H. Huntley (Democratic) 35.10%; ▌Joseph P. Jones (Greenback) 3.51%; ▌N. McGregor Steele (Prohibition) 3.00%
New York 4	Archibald M. Bliss	Democratic	1874	Incumbent re-elected.	▌ ✓ Archibald M. Bliss (Democratic) 54.03%; ▌William H. Lyon (Republican) 36.28%; ▌C. Osborn Ward (Socialist Labor) 3.45%; ▌John C. Keelly (Ind. Democratic) 3.23%; ▌William Hanson (Greenback) 3.01%
New York 5	Nicholas Muller	Democratic	1876	Incumbent re-elected.	▌ ✓ Nicholas Muller (Tammany Hall Dem.) 52.27%; ▌Thomas F. Burke (Republican) (Note: Also endorsed by the "Anti-Tammany" Democrats) 45.98%; ▌George Blair (Greenback) 1.55%; Others: ▌James E. Kerrigan (Greenback) 0.10%; ▌Alexander Frey (Socialist Labor) 0.10%
New York 6	Samuel S. Cox	Democratic	1873 (Special)	Incumbent re-elected.	▌ ✓ Samuel S. Cox (Tammany Hall Dem.) 62.44%; ▌Maurice S. D'Vries (Republican) 36.22%; ▌Isaac Bennett (Socialist Labor) 1.34%
New York 7	Anthony Eickhoff	Democratic	1876	Incumbent lost re-election. Republican gain.	▌ ✓ Edwin Einstein (Republican) 48.53%; ▌Anthony Eickhoff (Democratic) 45.63%; ▌John W. Jahelka (Greenback) 5.12%; ▌Thomas Green (Independent) 0.72%
New York 8	Anson G. McCook	Republican	1876	Incumbent re-elected.	▌ ✓ Anson G. McCook (Republican) 60.73%; ▌Lawrence R. Jerome (Democratic) 35.49%; ▌William W. Averill (Ind. Greenback) 3.68%; ▌Frederick E. Sinner (Socialist Labor) 0.09%
New York 9	Fernando Wood	Democratic	1866	Incumbent re-elected.	▌ ✓ Fernando Wood (Tammany Hall Dem.) 37.12%; ▌John Hardy (Anti-Tammany Dem.) 33.05%; ▌Wilson Berryman (Republican) 29.21%; ▌Joseph Kunze (Greenback) 0.62%
New York 10	Abram Hewitt	Democratic	1874	Incumbent retired. Independent Democratic gain.	▌ ✓ James O'Brien (Anti-Tammany Dem.) (Note: For the purposes of simplicity he is listed as having been elected an Independent Democrat.) 54.16%; ▌Orlando B. Potter (Tammany Hall Dem.) 43.29%; ▌John G. Shuck (Independent) 1.54%; ▌Garret Nagle (Independent) 1.01%
New York 11	Benjamin A. Willis	Democratic	1874	Incumbent lost re-election. Republican gain.	▌ ✓ Levi P. Morton (Republican) 65.65%; ▌Benjamin A. Willis (Tammany Hall Dem.) 32.92%; ▌G. Wallace Bryant (Anti-Tammany Dem.) 1.18%
New York 12	Clarkson Nott Potter	Democratic	1876	Incumbent retired. Republican gain.	▌ ✓ Alexander Smith (Republican) 49.64%; ▌Marcius L. Cobb (Democratic) 39.76%; ▌Nicholas Smith (Greenback) 10.60%
New York 13	John H. Ketcham	Republican	1876	Incumbent re-elected.	▌ ✓ John H. Ketcham (Republican) 62.78%; ▌Orlando D. Baker (Democratic) 33.39%; ▌John V. Doty (Greenback) 2.73%; Others: ▌George Potter (Prohibition) 0.85%; ▌Aaron J. Stevens (Independent) 0.26%
New York 14	George M. Beebe	Democratic	1874	Incumbent lost re-election. Republican gain.	▌ ✓ John W. Ferdon (Republican) 44.43%; ▌George M. Beebe (Democratic) 42.42%; ▌William Voorhis (Greenback) 12.22%; ▌Stephen Merritt (Prohibition) 0.93%
New York 15	Stephen L. Mayham	Democratic	1876	Incumbent retired. Democratic hold.	▌ ✓ William Lounsbery (Democratic) 47.52%; ▌George S. Nichols (Republican) 39.75%; ▌John R. Erkson (Greenback) 12.24%; ▌James H. Coutant (Prohibition) 0.49%
New York 16	Terence J. Quinn	Democratic	1876	Incumbent Terence J. Quinn died June 18, 1878. Republican gain. Successor also elected the same day to finish the term.	▌ ✓ John Mosher Bailey (Republican) 41.13%; ▌Francis H. Woods (Democratic) 40.47%; ▌Henry Hilton (Greenback) 18.39%
New York 17	Martin I. Townsend	Republican	1874	Incumbent retired. Republican hold.	▌ ✓ Walter A. Wood (Republican) 55.34%; ▌Charles E. Patterson (Democratic) 31.86%; ▌Richard H. Ferguson (Greenback) 12.80%
New York 18	Andrew Williams	Republican	1874	Incumbent retired. Republican hold.	▌ ✓ John Hammond (Republican) 54.84%; ▌John Ross (Democratic) 29.69%; ▌Leonard G. McDonald (Greenback) 15.47%
New York 19	Amaziah B. James	Republican	1876	Incumbent re-elected.	▌ ✓ Amaziah B. James (Republican) 70.59%; ▌Louis Hasbrouck (Democratic) 29.41%
New York 20	John H. Starin	Republican	1876	Incumbent re-elected.	▌ ✓ John H. Starin (Republican) 56.71%; ▌Alexander J. Thomson (Democratic) 34.78%; ▌Frederick F. Wendell (Greenback) 8.27%; ▌James H. Bronson (Prohibition) 0.24%
New York 21	Solomon Bundy	Republican	1876	Incumbent retired. Republican hold.	▌ ✓ David Wilber (Republican) 48.07%; ▌Bryon J. Scofield (Democratic) 31.82%; ▌Salmon G. Cone (Greenback) 18.81%; ▌Fred T. Jarvis (Prohibition) 1.29%
New York 22	George A. Bagley	Republican	1874	Incumbent retired. Republican hold.	▌ ✓ Warner Miller (Republican) 51.39%; ▌Levi H. Brown (Democratic) 40.33%; ▌Harry Lewis (Greenback) 7.27%; ▌Simon P. Gray (Prohibition) 1.00%
New York 23	William J. Bacon	Republican	1876	Incumbent retired. Republican hold.	▌ ✓ Cyrus D. Prescott (Republican) 42.95%; ▌John T. Spriggs (Democratic) 38.41%; ▌James Mitchell (Greenback) 16.61%; ▌John W. Meais (Prohibition) 1.98%
New York 24	William H. Baker	Republican	1874	Incumbent retired. Republican hold.	▌ ✓ Joseph Mason (Republican) 50.65%; ▌Sebastian Duffy (Democratic) 47.55%; ▌Winfield S. Smyth (Prohibition) 1.80%
New York 25	Frank Hiscock	Republican	1876	Incumbent re-elected.	▌ ✓ Frank Hiscock (Republican) 55.96%; ▌John M. Weiting (Democratic) 42.83%; ▌Lemuel N. Stratton (Prohibition) 1.21%
New York 26	John H. Camp	Republican	1876	Incumbent re-elected.	▌ ✓ John H. Camp (Republican) 53.02%; ▌Charles F. Durston (Democratic) 40.55%; ▌Martin L. Wolley (Greenback) 6.05%; ▌William D. Osborne (Prohibition) 0.38%
New York 27	Elbridge G. Lapham	Republican	1874	Incumbent re-elected.	▌ ✓ Elbridge G. Lapham (Republican) 54.47%; ▌David A. Pierpont (Democratic) 45.42%; ▌Thomas H. Howell (Prohibition) 0.11%
New York 28	Jeremiah W. Dwight	Republican	1876	Incumbent re-elected.	▌ ✓ Jeremiah W. Dwight (Republican) 54.47%; ▌William L. Mudge (Democratic) 38.72%; ▌Epenetus Howe (Greenback) 6.53%; ▌Gardine C. Hibbard (Prohibition) 0.73%
New York 29	John N. Hungerford	Republican	1876	Incumbent retired. Republican hold.	▌ ✓ David P. Richardson (Republican) 42.82%; ▌Francis G. Babcock (Democratic) 32.75%; ▌Ralph Beaumont (Greenback) 24.43%
New York 30	Elizur K. Hart	Democratic	1876	Incumbent retired. Republican gain.	▌ ✓ John Van Voorhis (Republican) 43.49%; ▌Alexander B. Lamberton (Democratic) 37.55%; ▌Nathan G. Brown (Greenback) 10.00%; ▌Alphonso A. Hopkins (Prohibition) 8.97%
New York 31	Charles B. Benedict	Democratic	1876	Incumbent retired. Republican gain.	▌ ✓ Richard Crowley (Republican) 56.33%; ▌Cyrus E. Davis (Democratic) 39.17%; ▌Galen Miller (Greenback) 2.51%; ▌Joseph W. Grosvenor (Prohibition) 1.03%; ▌James F. Gordon (Independent) 0.96%
New York 32	Daniel N. Lockwood	Democratic	1876	Incumbent lost re-election. Republican gain.	▌ ✓ Ray V. Pierce (Republican) 52.34%; ▌Daniel N. Lockwood (Democratic) 44.37%; ▌Augustus R. Grote (Prohibition) 3.28%
New York 33	George W. Patterson	Republican	1876	Incumbent retired. Republican hold.	▌ ✓ Henry Van Aernam (Republican) 49.87%; ▌Lorenzo Morris (Democratic) 29.55%; ▌Silas Vinton (Greenback) 20.58%

== North Carolina ==
District	Incumbent			This race	
District	Member	Party	First elected	Results	Candidates
North Carolina 1	Jesse Johnson Yeates	Democratic	1874	Incumbent lost re-election. Republican gain.	▌ ✓ Joseph John Martin (Republican) 49.2%; ▌ Jesse Johnson Yeates (Democratic) 49.0%; ▌ J. B. Respess (Independent Republican) 1.8%
North Carolina 1	Jesse Johnson Yeates	Democratic	1874	Election successfully contested. Incumbent re-elected and seated January 29, 1881.	▌ ✓ Jesse Johnson Yeates (Democratic); ▌ Joseph John Martin (Republican); ▌ J. B. Respess (Independent Republican)
North Carolina 2	Curtis Hooks Brogden	Republican	1876	Incumbent retired. Democratic gain.	▌ ✓ William H. Kitchin (Democratic) 42.9%; ▌ James E. O'Hara (Republican) 38.8%; ▌ James Harris (Independent Republican) 15.8%; ▌ J. Williams Thorne (Independent Republican) 2.5%
North Carolina 3	Alfred Moore Waddell	Democratic	1870	Incumbent lost re-election. Greenback gain.	▌ ✓ Daniel Lindsay Russell (Greenback/Republican) 51.9%; ▌ Alfred Moore Waddell (Democratic) 48.0%
North Carolina 4	Joseph J. Davis	Democratic	1874	Incumbent re-elected.	▌ ✓ Joseph J. Davis (Democratic) 51.1%; ▌ Josiah Turner (Independent Republican) 36.0%; ▌ Wiley D. Jones (Republican) 12.5%
North Carolina 5	Alfred Moore Scales	Democratic	1874	Incumbent re-elected.	▌ ✓ Alfred Moore Scales (Democratic) 57.3%; ▌ Albion W. Tourgée (Republican) 42.6%
North Carolina 6	Walter Leak Steele	Democratic	1876	Incumbent re-elected.	▌ ✓ Walter Leak Steele (Democratic) 92.1%; ▌ [FNU] Covington (Independent) 4.8%
North Carolina 7	William M. Robbins	Democratic	1872	Incumbent retired. Democratic hold.	▌ ✓ Robert Franklin Armfield (Democratic) 55.7%; ▌ John M. Brower (Republican/Greenback) 42.8%
North Carolina 8	Robert B. Vance	Democratic	1872	Incumbent re-elected.	▌ ✓ Robert B. Vance (Democratic) 96.8%

== Ohio ==
District	Incumbent			This race	
District	Member	Party	First elected	Results	Candidates
Ohio 1	Milton Sayler	Democratic	1872	Incumbent lost re-election. Republican gain.	▌ ✓ Benjamin Butterworth (Republican) 50.5%; ▌ Milton Sayler (Democratic) 47.7%; ▌ P. H. Clark (Socialist Labor) 1.1%; ▌ [FNU] Spohn (Greenback) 0.7%
Ohio 2	Henry B. Banning	Democratic	1872	Incumbent retired. Republican gain.	▌ ✓ Thomas L. Young (Republican) 50.9%; ▌ Leonard W. Goss (Democratic) 47.0%
Ohio 3	John A. McMahon; Redistricted from the 4th district	Democratic	1874	Incumbent re-elected.	▌ ✓ John A. McMahon (Democratic) 51.0%; ▌ Emanuel Shultz (Republican) 47.5%; ▌ [FNU] Nolan (Greenback) 1.1%; ▌ D. Staley (Prohibition) 0.4%
Ohio 4	J. Warren Keifer; Redistricted from the 8th district	Republican	1876	Incumbent re-elected.	▌ ✓ J. Warren Keifer (Republican) 56.6%; ▌ William V. Marquis (Democratic) 38.5%; ▌ William A. Hance (Greenback) 3.2%; ▌ S. K. Spahr (Prohibition) 1.7%
Ohio 5	None (new district)			New seat. Democratic gain.	▌ ✓ Benjamin Le Fevre (Democratic) 48.5%; ▌ Harrison Wilson (Republican) 42.5%; ▌ Stephen Johnson (Greenback) 7.9%; ▌ J. H. Blackford (Prohibition) 1.1%
Ohio 6	Americus V. Rice; Redistricted from the 5th district	Democratic	1874	Incumbent retired. Democratic hold.	▌ ✓ William D. Hill (Democratic) 52.4%; ▌ James Latimer Price (Republican) 39.3%; ▌ William C. Holgate (Greenback) 8.3%
Ohio 7	Jacob D. Cox; Redistricted from the 6th district	Republican	1876	Incumbent retired. Democratic gain.	▌ ✓ Frank H. Hurd (Democratic) 40.7%; ▌ James B. Luckey (Republican) 34.9%; ▌ Henry Kahlo (Greenback) 24.4%
Ohio 8	Ebenezer B. Finley; Redistricted from the 14th district	Democratic	1876	Incumbent re-elected.	▌ ✓ Ebenezer B. Finley (Democratic) 50.2%; ▌ Charles Foster (Republican) 46.3%; ▌ [FNU] Brown (Greenback) 3.4%; ▌ [FNU] Deal (Prohibition) 0.1%
Ohio 8	Charles Foster; Redistricted from the 10th district	Republican	1870	Incumbent lost re-election. Republican loss.	▌ ✓ Ebenezer B. Finley (Democratic) 50.2%; ▌ Charles Foster (Republican) 46.3%; ▌ [FNU] Brown (Greenback) 3.4%; ▌ [FNU] Deal (Prohibition) 0.1%
Ohio 9	Mills Gardner; Redistricted from the 3rd district	Republican	1876	Incumbent retired. Democratic gain.	▌ ✓ George L. Converse (Democratic) 48.9%; ▌ Lorenzo English (Republican) 46.2%
Ohio 9	John S. Jones	Republican	1876	Incumbent retired. Republican loss.	▌ ✓ George L. Converse (Democratic) 48.9%; ▌ Lorenzo English (Republican) 46.2%
Ohio 10	Thomas Ewing Jr. Redistricted from the 12th district	Democratic	1876	Incumbent re-elected.	▌ ✓ Thomas Ewing Jr. (Democratic) 50.4%; ▌ Valentine B. Horton (Republican) 48.7%; ▌ [FNU] Smart (Greenback) 0.8%; ▌ H. S. Scott (Prohibition) 0.1%
Ohio 11	Henry L. Dickey; Redistricted from the 7th district	Democratic	1876	Incumbent re-elected.	▌ ✓ Henry L. Dickey (Democratic) 50.4%; ▌ W. W. McKnight (Republican) 45.9%; ▌ J. Printy (Greenback) 3.7%
Ohio 12	Henry S. Neal; Redistricted from the 11th district	Republican	1876	Incumbent re-elected.	▌ ✓ Henry S. Neal (Republican) 52.0%; ▌ James Emmitt (Democratic) 44.6%; ▌ [FNU] Suiter (Greenback) 3.0%; ▌ [FNU] Kirkendall (Prohibition) 0.4%
Ohio 13	Nelson H. Van Vorhes; Redistricted from the 15th district	Republican	1874	Incumbent lost re-election. Democratic gain.	▌ ✓ Adoniram J. Warner (Democratic) 46.7%; ▌ Nelson H. Van Vorhes (Republican) 46.2%; ▌ George E. Geddes (Greenback) 5.8%; ▌ J. M. McElhinney (Prohibition) 1.2%
Ohio 14	Milton I. Southard; Redistricted from the 13th district	Democratic	1872	Incumbent retired. Democratic hold.	▌ ✓ Gibson Atherton (Democratic) 49.7%; ▌ Isaac Morton (Republican) 41.7%; ▌ Thomas J. McGinnis (Greenback) 8.6%
Ohio 15	None (new district)			New seat. Democratic gain.	▌ ✓ George W. Geddes (Democratic) 54.3%; ▌ Goshorn A. Jones (Republican) 38.4%; ▌ George W. Pepper (Greenback) 6.4%; ▌ C. W. Kohr (Prohibition) 0.9%
Ohio 16	William McKinley; Redistricted from the 17th district	Republican	1876	Incumbent re-elected.	▌ ✓ William McKinley (Republican) 49.8%; ▌ Aquila Wiley (Democratic) 45.8%; ▌ [FNU] Hunter (Greenback) 4.1%; ▌ J. A. Brush (Prohibition) 0.3%
Ohio 17	James Monroe; Redistricted from the 18th district	Republican	1870	Incumbent re-elected.	▌ ✓ James Monroe (Republican) 54.2%; ▌ Lewis Miller (Democratic/Greenback) 45.9%
Ohio 18	Lorenzo Danford; Redistricted from the 16th district	Republican	1872	Incumbent retired. Republican hold.	▌ ✓ Jonathan T. Updegraff (Republican) 50.6%; ▌ Daniel T. Lawson (Democratic) 41.6%; ▌ George Smith (Greenback) 7.4%; ▌ W. M. Grimes (Prohibition) 0.4%
Ohio 19	James A. Garfield	Republican	1862	Incumbent re-elected.	▌ ✓ James A. Garfield (Republican) 61.4%; ▌ John C. Hubbard (Democratic) 27.0%; ▌ Grandison N. Tuttle (Greenback) 11.3%
Ohio 20	Amos Townsend	Republican	1876	Incumbent re-elected.	▌ ✓ Amos Townsend (Republican) 47.8%; ▌ Joseph M. Poe (Democratic) 26.6%; ▌ Gilbert O. Shove (Prohibition) 18.0%; ▌ William H. Doan (Greenback) 7.6%

== Oregon ==
District	Incumbent			This race	
District	Member	Party	First elected	Results	Candidates
Oregon at-large	Richard Williams	Republican	1876	Incumbent retired. Democratic gain.	▌ ✓ John Whiteaker (Democratic) 49.9%; ▌ Harvey K. Hines (Republican) 46.5%; ▌ T. F. Campbell (Greenback) 3.6%

== Pennsylvania ==
District	Incumbent			This race	
District	Member	Party	First elected	Results	Candidates
Pennsylvania 1	Chapman Freeman	Republican	1874	Incumbent retired. Republican hold.	▌ ✓ Henry H. Bingham (Republican) 56.5%; ▌ William McCandless (Democratic) 26.0%; ▌ Maxwell Stevenson (Greenback) 17.5%
Pennsylvania 2	Charles O'Neill	Republican	1872	Incumbent re-elected.	▌ ✓ Charles O'Neill (Republican) 59.5%; ▌ Charles H. Gibson (Democratic) 38.8%; ▌ Charles S. Keyser (Greenback) 1.7%
Pennsylvania 3	Samuel J. Randall	Democratic	1862	Incumbent re-elected.	▌ ✓ Samuel J. Randall (Democratic) 57.4%; ▌ John Shedden (Republican/Greenback) 42.7%
Pennsylvania 4	William D. Kelley	Republican	1860	Incumbent re-elected.	▌ ✓ William D. Kelley (Republican/Greenback) 60.3%; ▌ Charles H. Barnes (Democratic) 39.7%
Pennsylvania 5	Alfred C. Harmer	Republican	1876	Incumbent re-elected.	▌ ✓ Alfred C. Harmer (Republican) 55.8%; ▌ David E. Dallam (Democratic) 39.1%; ▌ Uriah Smith Stephens (Greenback) 5.1%
Pennsylvania 6	William Ward	Republican	1876	Incumbent re-elected.	▌ ✓ William Ward (Republican) 57.8%; ▌ Bethel M. Custer (Democratic) 36.7%; ▌ John Hibberd (Greenback) 3.1%; ▌ E. F. Pennypacker (Prohibition) 2.4%
Pennsylvania 7	Isaac Newton Evans	Republican	1876	Incumbent retired. Republican hold.	▌ ✓ William Godshalk (Republican) 51.3%; ▌ Oliver P. James (Democratic) 46.8%; ▌ Henry L. Acker (Greenback) 1.9%
Pennsylvania 8	Hiester Clymer	Democratic	1872	Incumbent re-elected.	▌ ✓ Hiester Clymer (Democratic) 58.6%; ▌ H. Maltzberger (Republican) 30.4%; ▌ Daniel B. Yoder (Greenback) 11.0%
Pennsylvania 9	A. Herr Smith	Republican	1872	Incumbent re-elected.	▌ ✓ A. Herr Smith (Republican) 62.8%; ▌ W. R. Wilson (Democratic) 34.9%; ▌ I. S. Clare (Greenback) 1.5%; ▌ James Black (Prohibition) 0.7%
Pennsylvania 10	Samuel A. Bridges	Democratic	1876	Incumbent retired. Democratic hold.	▌ ✓ Reuben K. Bachman (Democratic) 58.7%; ▌ H. Bower Longaker (Greenback) 25.8%; ▌ George W. Whittaker (Republican) 15.6%
Pennsylvania 11	Francis D. Collins	Democratic	1874	Incumbent retired. Democratic hold.	▌ ✓ Robert Klotz (Democratic) 31.8%; ▌ Edwin Albright (Republican) 31.4%; ▌ C. E. Orvis (Greenback) 20.1%; ▌ Charles B. Brockway (Independent Democratic) 16.8%
Pennsylvania 12	Hendrick B. Wright	Democratic	1876	Incumbent re-elected as a Greenback candidate. Greenback gain.	▌ ✓ Hendrick B. Wright (Greenback/Democratic) 55.9%; ▌ Henry Roberts (Republican) 43.2%; ▌ William H. Richmond (Prohibition) 0.8%; ▌ M. J. Flanagan (Independent Democratic) 0.1%
Pennsylvania 13	James B. Reilly	Democratic	1874	Incumbent lost renomination. Democratic hold.	▌ ✓ John Walker Ryon (Democratic) 36.3%; ▌ Charles N. Brumm (Greenback) 35.4%; ▌ Howell Fisher (Republican) 28.3%
Pennsylvania 14	John W. Killinger	Republican	1876	Incumbent re-elected.	▌ ✓ John W. Killinger (Republican) 46.1%; ▌ M. J. Withington (Democratic) 40.6%; ▌ Daniel D. Earley (Greenback) 13.4%
Pennsylvania 15	Edward Overton Jr.	Republican	1876	Incumbent re-elected.	▌ ✓ Edward Overton Jr. (Republican) 49.2%; ▌ D. C. DeWitt (Greenback) 34.9%; ▌ William H. Dimmick (Democratic) 14.1%; ▌ [FNU] Chase (Prohibition) 1.8%
Pennsylvania 16	John I. Mitchell	Republican	1876	Incumbent re-elected.	▌ ✓ John I. Mitchell (Republican) 41.0%; ▌ T. F. Davis (Greenback) 37.4%; ▌ R. B. Smith (Democratic) 21.6%
Pennsylvania 17	Jacob M. Campbell	Republican	1876	Incumbent lost re-election. Democratic gain.	▌ ✓ Alexander H. Coffroth (Democratic) 46.3%; ▌ Jacob M. Campbell (Republican) 45.2%; ▌ Samuel Adams (Greenback) 8.5%
Pennsylvania 18	William Stenger	Democratic	1874	Incumbent lost re-election. Republican gain.	▌ ✓ Horatio G. Fisher (Republican) 49.1%; ▌ William Stenger (Democratic) 48.4%; ▌ John W. Dougherty (Greenback) 2.5%
Pennsylvania 19	Levi Maish	Democratic	1874	Incumbent lost renomination. Democratic hold.	▌ ✓ Frank E. Beltzhoover (Democratic) 57.5%; ▌ Thomas E. Cochran (Republican) 39.8%; ▌ James R. Dayton (Greenback) 2.7%
Pennsylvania 20	Levi A. Mackey	Democratic	1874	Incumbent retired. Greenback gain.	▌ ✓ Seth H. Yocum (Greenback/Republican) 50.1%; ▌ Andrew Gregg Curtin (Democratic) 49.9%
Pennsylvania 21	Jacob Turney	Democratic	1874	Incumbent retired. Democratic hold.	▌ ✓ Morgan R. Wise (Democratic) 49.5%; ▌ S. M. Bailey (Republican) 35.8%; ▌ A. L. McFarlane (Greenback) 14.7%
Pennsylvania 22	Russell Errett	Republican	1876	Incumbent re-elected.	▌ ✓ Russell Errett (Republican) 38.0%; ▌ David Kirk (Greenback) 31.1%; ▌ James K. Duff (Democratic) 30.4%; ▌ James O'Neil (Prohibition) 0.5%
Pennsylvania 23	Thomas M. Bayne	Republican	1876	Incumbent re-elected.	▌ ✓ Thomas M. Bayne (Republican) 51.2%; ▌ Charles F. McKenna (Democratic) 31.6%; ▌ Samuel Watson (Greenback) 15.6%; ▌ W. W. Grier (Prohibition) 1.6%
Pennsylvania 24	William S. Shallenberger	Republican	1876	Incumbent re-elected.	▌ ✓ William S. Shallenberger (Republican) 48.6%; ▌ R. W. Clendennin (Democratic) 43.2%; ▌ James E. Emerson (Greenback) 8.2%
Pennsylvania 25	Harry White	Republican	1876	Incumbent re-elected.	▌ ✓ Harry White (Republican) 37.6%; ▌ James M. Guffey (Democratic) 31.3%; ▌ James Mosgrove (Greenback) 31.1%
Pennsylvania 26	John McCandless Thompson	Republican	1876	Incumbent retired. Republican hold.	▌ ✓ Samuel B. Dick (Republican) 41.7%; ▌ William C. Plummer (Greenback) 37.8%; ▌ John T. Bard (Democratic) 19.5%; ▌ D. Latshaw (Prohibition) 1.1%
Pennsylvania 27	Lewis F. Watson	Republican	1876	Incumbent retired. Republican hold.	▌ ✓ James H. Osmer (Republican) 44.5%; ▌ George A. Allen (Democratic) 34.0%; ▌ Cyrus C. Camp (Greenback) 20.4%; ▌ Samuel Axtell (Prohibition) 1.2%

== Rhode Island ==
District	Incumbent			This race	
District	Member	Party	First elected	Results	Candidates
Rhode Island 1	Benjamin T. Eames	Republican	1870	Incumbent retired. Republican hold.	▌ ✓ Nelson W. Aldrich (Republican) 74.5%; ▌ Thomas Davis (Democratic) 16.6%; ▌ Lycurgus Sayles (Greenback) 7.8%
Rhode Island 2	Latimer W. Ballou	Republican	1874	Incumbent re-elected.	▌ ✓ Latimer W. Ballou (Republican) 53.3%; ▌ Jerothmul B. Barnaby (Democratic) 43.6%; ▌ John Francis Smith (Greenback) 3.1%

== South Carolina ==
South Carolina was rampant with voter fraud, particularly through the use of tissue ballots, thin ballots hidden in the normal ballot, typically 10 to 20 at a time. The almost statewide exclusion of Republicans as Commissioners of Elections, and the ensuing appointment of nearly all Democratic Managers of Elections, allowed to Democratic Managers to perpetrate this scheme. When the votes were counted and more votes than voters were found, the Managers removed and destroyed the Republican ballots resulting in the complete takeover of the state.

District	Incumbent			This race	
District	Member	Party	First elected	Results	Candidates
South Carolina 1	Joseph Rainey	Republican	1870 (special)	Incumbent lost re-election. Democratic gain.	▌ ✓ John S. Richardson (Democratic) 61.70%; ▌Joseph Rainey (Republican) 38.30%
South Carolina 2	Richard H. Cain	Republican	1876	Incumbent lost re-election. Democratic gain.	▌ ✓ Michael P. O'Connor (Democratic) 60.94%; ▌Edmund W. M. Mackey (Republican) 39.06%
South Carolina 3	D. Wyatt Aiken	Democratic	1876	Incumbent re-elected.	▌ ✓ D. Wyatt Aiken (Democratic) 79.44%; ▌J. F. Ensor (Republican) 20.56%
South Carolina 4	John H. Evins	Democratic	1876	Incumbent re-elected.	▌ ✓ John H. Evins (Democratic) 96.84%; ▌Alexander S. Wallace (Republican) 3.16%
South Carolina 5	Robert Smalls	Republican	1874	Incumbent lost re-election. Democratic gain.	▌ ✓ George D. Tillman (Democratic) 71.24%; ▌Robert Smalls (Republican) 28.76%

== Tennessee ==
District	Incumbent			This race	
District	Member	Party	First elected	Results	Candidates
Tennessee 1	James H. Randolph	Republican	1876	Incumbent retired. Democratic gain.	▌ ✓ Robert L. Taylor (Democratic) 51.61%; ▌A. H. Pettibone (Republican) 48.39%
Tennessee 2	Jacob M. Thornburgh	Republican	1872	Incumbent retired. Republican hold.	▌ ✓ Leonidas C. Houk (Republican) 57.12%; ▌Albert G. Watkins (Ind. Democratic) 42.88%
Tennessee 3	George G. Dibrell	Democratic	1874	Incumbent re-elected.	▌ ✓ George G. Dibrell (Democratic) 69.09%; ▌Xenophon Wheeler (Republican) 30.91%
Tennessee 4	Haywood Y. Riddle	Democratic	1875 (special)	Incumbent retired. Democratic hold.	▌ ✓ Benton McMillin (Democratic) 64.99%; ▌E. J. Golladay (Ind. Democratic) 35.01%
Tennessee 5	John M. Bright	Democratic	1870	Incumbent re-elected.	▌ ✓ John M. Bright (Democratic) 65.41%; ▌B. F. Lillard (Democratic) 20.23%; ▌James A. Warder (Republican) 7.53%; ▌P. C. Isbell (Greenback) 6.83%
Tennessee 6	John F. House	Democratic	1874	Incumbent re-elected.	▌ ✓ John F. House (Democratic) 57.18%; ▌George F. Akers (Greenback) 27.75%; ▌William F. Prosser (Republican) 14.29%; ▌Jonathan A. Campbell (Ind. Greenback) 0.77%
Tennessee 7	Washington C. Whitthorne	Democratic	1870	Incumbent re-elected.	▌ ✓ Washington C. Whitthorne (Democratic) 43.16%; ▌Jonathan H. Moore (Democratic) 36.29%; ▌A. M. Hughes (Republican) 20.55%
Tennessee 8	John D. C. Atkins	Democratic	1872	Incumbent re-elected.	▌ ✓ John D. C. Atkins (Democratic) 61.40%; ▌James T. Warren (Greenback) 38.60%
Tennessee 9	William P. Caldwell	Democratic	1874	Incumbent retired. Democratic hold.	▌ ✓ Charles B. Simonton (Democratic) 63.68%; ▌Gideon B. Black (Greenback) 36.32%
Tennessee 10	H. Casey Young	Democratic	1874	Incumbent re-elected.	▌ ✓ H. Casey Young (Democratic) 54.79%; ▌William M. Randolph (Republican) 31.74%; ▌A. J. Keller (Greenback) 13.47%

== Texas ==
District	Incumbent			This race	
District	Member	Party	First elected	Results	Candidates
Texas 1	John H. Reagan	Democratic	1874	Incumbent re-elected.	▌ ✓ John H. Reagan (Democratic) 98.7%; ▌ [FNU] Newton (Independent) 1.1%
Texas 2	David B. Culberson	Democratic	1874	Incumbent re-elected.	▌ ✓ David B. Culberson (Democratic) 63.1%; ▌ H. F. O'Neal (Greenback) 30.8%
Texas 3	James W. Throckmorton	Democratic	1874	Incumbent retired. Democratic hold.	▌ ✓ Olin Wellborn (Democratic) 80.5%; ▌ Ephraim M. Daggett (Greenback) 19.2%
Texas 4	Roger Q. Mills	Democratic	1872	Incumbent re-elected.	▌ ✓ Roger Q. Mills (Democratic) 75.7%; ▌ J. P. Smith (Greenback) 22.4%
Texas 5	D. C. Giddings	Democratic	1876	Incumbent retired. Greenback gain.	▌ ✓ George Washington Jones (Greenback) 51.6%; ▌ John Hancock (Democratic) 48.2%
Texas 6	Gustav Schleicher	Democratic	1874	Incumbent re-elected.	▌ ✓ Gustav Schleicher (Democratic) 56.7%; ▌ John Ireland (Independent Democratic) 43.3%

== Vermont ==
District	Incumbent			This race	
District	Member	Party	First elected	Results	Candidates
Vermont 1	Charles H. Joyce	Republican	1874	Incumbent re-elected.	▌ ✓ Charles H. Joyce (Republican) 68.1%; ▌Jean Randall (Democratic) 31.9%
Vermont 2	Dudley C. Denison	Republican	1874	Incumbent retired. Republican hold.	▌ ✓ James M. Tyler (Republican) 71.3%; ▌Asa M. Dickey (Democratic) 28.4%; ▌S. B. Barnard (Unknown) 0.2%
Vermont 3	George Hendee	Republican	1872	Incumbent lost re-election. Greenback gain.	First ballot: ▌Bradley Barlow (Greenback) 46.8%; ▌William W. Grout (Republican) 34.2%; ▌George S. Waterman (Democratic) 18.3%; ▌H. Henry Powers (Republican) 0.3%; ▌George Hendee (Republican) 0.1%; ▌George N. Dale (Republican) 0.1%; Second ballot: ▌ ✓ Bradley Barlow (Greenback) 60.4%; ▌William W. Grout (Republican) 31.3%; ▌George S. Waterman (Democratic) 7.9%; ▌W. H. H. Bingham (Democratic) 0.2%

== Virginia ==
District	Incumbent			This race	
District	Member	Party	First elected	Results	Candidates
Virginia 1	Richard L. T. Beale	Democratic	1847; 1849 (retired); 1878 (special)	Incumbent re-elected.	▌ ✓ Richard L. T. Beale (Democratic) 48.3%; ▌George C. Round (Republican) 36.4%; ▌John Critcher (Greenback) 15.3%
Virginia 2	John Goode	Democratic	1874	Incumbent re-elected.	▌ ✓ John Goode (Democratic) 56.7%; ▌John F. Dezendorf (Republican) 43.3%
Virginia 3	Gilbert C. Walker	Democratic	1874	Incumbent retired. Democratic hold.	▌ ✓ Joseph E. Johnston (Democratic) 58.1%; ▌William W. Newman (Greenback) 41.9%
Virginia 4	Joseph Jorgensen	Republican	1876	Incumbent re-elected.	▌ ✓ Joseph Jorgensen (Republican) 60.7%; ▌William E. Hinton (Democratic) 39.3%
Virginia 5	George Cabell	Democratic	1874	Incumbent re-elected.	▌ ✓ George Cabell (Democratic) 66.7%; ▌W. A. Witcher (Independent) 33.3%
Virginia 6	J. Randolph Tucker	Democratic	1874	Incumbent re-elected.	▌ ✓ J. Randolph Tucker (Democratic) 63.4%; ▌Camm Patterson (Greenback) 36.3%; ▌Lewis W. Cabell (Unknown) 0.3%
Virginia 7	John T. Harris	Democratic	1870	Incumbent re-elected.	▌ ✓ John T. Harris (Democratic) 56.5%; ▌John Paul (Conservative) 43.5%
Virginia 8	Eppa Hunton	Democratic	1872	Incumbent re-elected.	▌ ✓ Eppa Hunton (Democratic) 78.0%; ▌John R. Carton (Independent) 15.1%; ▌James Cochran (Independent) 6.8%
Virginia 9	Auburn Pridemore	Democratic	1876	Incumbent lost renomination. Democratic hold.	▌ ✓ James B. Richmond (Democratic) 33.7%; ▌Fayette McMullen (Independent) 31.8%; ▌Samuel H. Newberry (Independent) 30.5%; ▌Charles C. Campbell (Republican) 4.0%

== West Virginia ==
District	Incumbent			This race	
District	Member	Party	First elected	Results	Candidates
West Virginia 1	Benjamin Wilson	Democratic	1874	Incumbent re-elected.	▌ ✓ Benjamin Wilson (Democratic) 48.95%; ▌J. R. Hubbard (Republican) 38.43%; ▌James Bassell (Greenback) 12.62%
West Virginia 2	Benjamin F. Martin	Democratic	1876	Incumbent re-elected.	▌ ✓ Benjamin F. Martin (Democratic) 56.61%; ▌F. A. Burr (Republican) 27.85%; ▌J. H. Thompson (Greenback) 15.53%
West Virginia 3	John E. Kenna	Democratic	1876	Incumbent re-elected.	▌ ✓ John E. Kenna (Democratic) 54.01%; ▌Henry I. Walker (Republican) 45.99%

== Wisconsin ==
Wisconsin elected eight members of congress on Election Day, November 5, 1878.

District	Incumbent			This race	
District	Member	Party	First elected	Results	Candidates
Wisconsin 1	Charles G. Williams	Republican	1872	Incumbent re-elected.	▌ ✓ Charles G. Williams (Republican) 59.5%; ▌Charles H. Parker (Greenback) 40.5%
Wisconsin 2	Lucien B. Caswell	Republican	1874	Incumbent re-elected.	▌ ✓ Lucien B. Caswell (Republican) 51.5%; ▌Romanzo E. Davis (Democratic) 38.8%; ▌Horace A. Tenney (Greenback) 9.7%
Wisconsin 3	George C. Hazelton	Republican	1876	Incumbent re-elected.	▌ ✓ George C. Hazelton (Republican) 50.2%; ▌Owen King (Democratic) 49.8%
Wisconsin 4	William Pitt Lynde	Democratic	1874	Incumbent lost renomination. Democratic hold.	▌ ✓ Peter V. Deuster (Democratic) 47.4%; ▌Leander F. Frisby (Republican) 46.8%; ▌Truman H. Judd (Greenback) 5.7%
Wisconsin 5	Edward S. Bragg	Democratic	1876	Incumbent re-elected.	▌ ✓ Edward S. Bragg (Democratic) 46.2%; ▌Hiram N. Smith (Republican) 38.3%; ▌David Giddings (Greenback) 15.5%
Wisconsin 6	Gabriel Bouck	Democratic	1876	Incumbent re-elected.	▌ ✓ Gabriel Bouck (Democratic) 45.9%; ▌James V. Jones (Republican) 37.6%; ▌George McKendree Steele (Greenback) 16.5%
Wisconsin 7	Herman L. Humphrey	Republican	1876	Incumbent re-elected.	▌ ✓ Herman L. Humphrey (Republican) 54.2%; ▌Charles D. Parker (Democratic) 45.8%
Wisconsin 8	Thaddeus C. Pound	Republican	1876	Incumbent re-elected.	▌ ✓ Thaddeus C. Pound (Republican) 52.8%; ▌Augustus Barrows (Democratic) 47.2%

== Non-voting delegates ==
District	Incumbent			This race	
District	Member	Party	First elected	Results	Candidates
Arizona Territory at-large
Dakota Territory at-large	Jefferson P. Kidder	Republican	1874	Incumbent lost re-election. Independent Republican gain.	▌ ✓ Granville G. Bennett (Ind. Republican); ▌Jefferson P. Kidder (Republican); [data missing]
Idaho Territory at-large	Stephen S. Fenn	Democratic	1874	Incumbent retired. Democratic hold.	▌ ✓ George Ainslie (Democratic) 61.37%; ▌Jonas W. Brown (Republican) 38.63%
Montana Territory at-large	Martin Maginnis	Democratic	1872	Incumbent re-elected.	▌ ✓ Martin Maginnis (Democratic) 70.40%; ▌Sample Orr (Republican) 29.60%
New Mexico Territory at-large
Utah Territory at-large
Washington Territory at-large
Wyoming Territory at-large	William W. Corlett	Republican	1876	Incumbent retired. Republican hold.	▌ ✓ Stephen W. Downey (Republican) 58.33%; ▌E. L. Pease (Democratic) 41.85%

== See also ==
- 1878–79 United States Senate elections
- 45th United States Congress
- 46th United States Congress

== Bibliography ==
- Dubin, Michael J. (March 1, 1998). United States Congressional Elections, 1788-1997: The Official Results of the Elections of the 1st Through 105th Congresses. McFarland and Company. ISBN 978-0786402830.
- Martis, Kenneth C. (January 1, 1989). The Historical Atlas of Political Parties in the United States Congress, 1789-1989. Macmillan Publishing Company. ISBN 978-0029201701.
- Moore, John L., ed. (1994). Congressional Quarterly's Guide to U.S. Elections (Third ed.). Congressional Quarterly Inc. ISBN 978-0871879967.
- "Party Divisions of the House of Representatives* 1789–Present". Office of the Historian, House of United States House of Representatives.
