= Ezekiel Bacon =

American politician (1776–1870)

Member of the U.S. House of Representatives from Massachusetts's 12th district
- In office November 2, 1807 – March 3, 1813
- Preceded by: Barnabas Bidwell
- Succeeded by: Daniel Dewey

Personal details
- Born: September 1, 1776 Boston, Massachusetts, U.S.
- Died: October 18, 1870 (aged 94) Utica, New York, U.S.
- Resting place: Forest Hill Cemetery; Utica, New York, U.S.
- Party: Democratic-Republican
- Children: William J. Bacon
- Parent: John Bacon (father)
- Education: Yale College; Litchfield Law School
- Profession: Lawyer

Ezekiel Bacon (September 1, 1776 – October 18, 1870), was an American lawyer and politician from Massachusetts and New York.

== Early life ==
Ezekiel Bacon was born on September 1, 1776, in Boston, Massachusetts to Elizabeth (née Goldthwaite) and John Bacon. He graduated from Yale College in 1794. Then he attended Litchfield Law School and studied law with Nathan Dane in Beverly, Massachusetts. He was admitted to the bar in 1800.

== Career ==
Bacon commenced practice in Stockbridge, Massachusetts. He was a member of the Massachusetts House of Representatives from 1805 to 1806.

Bacon was elected as a Democratic-Republican to the 10th United States Congress to fill the vacancy caused by the resignation of Barnabas Bidwell and took his seat on November 2, 1807. He was re-elected to the 11th and 12th United States Congresses, holding office until March 3, 1813. He was the chairman of the Committee on Ways and Means (12th Congress).

He was chief justice of the Court of Common Pleas for the Western District of Massachusetts from 1811 to 1814, and Comptroller of the U.S. Treasury from 1814 to 1815.

In 1816, he moved to Utica, New York, and was appointed an associate judge of the Oneida County Court in 1818. He was a member of the New York State Assembly in 1819, and a delegate to the New York State Constitutional Convention of 1821. In 1826, he ran again for Congress but was defeated by the incumbent Henry R. Storrs.

At the time of his death, he was the oldest surviving Member of Congress and the last representative of the administration of President James Madison.

== Personal life ==
Bacon died on October 18, 1870, in Utica. He was buried at the Forest Hill Cemetery in Utica.

Judge and congressman William J. Bacon was his son.

U.S. House of Representatives
Preceded by Barnabas Bidwell	Member of the U.S. House of Representatives from Massachusetts's 12th congressional district 1807–1813	Succeeded by Daniel Dewey
