= Scott Lord =

American politician

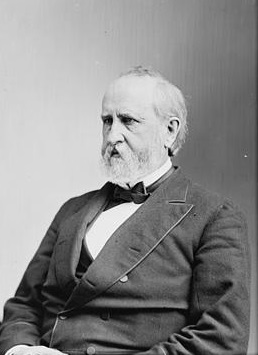

Member of the U.S. House of Representatives from New York's 23rd district
- In office March 4, 1875 – March 3, 1877
- Preceded by: William E. Lansing
- Succeeded by: William J. Bacon

Personal details
- Born: December 11, 1820 Nelson, New York
- Died: September 10, 1885 (aged 64) Morris Plains, New Jersey
- Resting place: Temple Hill Cemetery, Geneseo, New York

Scott Lord (December 11, 1820 – September 10, 1885) was an American lawyer and politician who served one term as a U.S. representative from New York from 1875 to 1877.

== Biography ==
Born in Nelson, New York, Lord attended the common schools and the local academies at Morrisville and Geneseo. He studied law. He was admitted to the bar in 1842 and commenced practice in Mount Morris, New York.

He moved to Geneseo, the county seat, in 1847. He served as judge of Livingston County 1847-1856. He resumed the practice of law. He moved to Utica, New York, in 1872 and continued the practice of his profession.

=== Congress ===
Lord was elected as a Democrat to the Forty-fourth Congress (March 4, 1875 – March 3, 1877).

He was one of the managers appointed by the House of Representatives in 1876 to conduct the impeachment proceedings against William W. Belknap, ex-Secretary of War. Lord was the first member of Congress to have the first name Scott.

He was an unsuccessful candidate for reelection in 1876 to the Forty-fifth Congress. Two Oneida people exercising what they considered their right to suffrage voted for Lord in 1876, though they were later arrested and their votes were ruled invalid.

=== Later career and death ===
He moved to New York City in 1877 and again engaged in the practice of law. He represented some of the children of Cornelius Vanderbilt in an unsuccessful 1877 to invalidate his will.

He died in Morris Plains, New Jersey, September 10, 1885. He was interred in Temple Hill Cemetery, Geneseo, New York.

== Sources ==
- United States Congress. "Scott Lord (id: L000442)". Biographical Directory of the United States Congress.

U.S. House of Representatives
Preceded by William E. Lansing	Member of the U.S. House of Representatives from New York's 23rd congressional district March 4, 1875 – March 3, 1877	Succeeded by William J. Bacon
