= George Whitman Hendee =

American lawyer, banker, and politician (1832–1906)

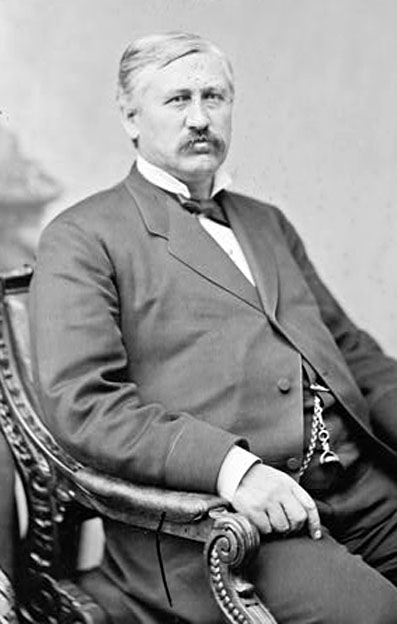
- Hendee, 1865–1880

Member of the U.S. House of Representatives from Vermont's 3rd district
- In office March 4, 1873 – March 3, 1879
- Preceded by: Worthington C. Smith
- Succeeded by: Bradley Barlow

32nd Governor of Vermont
- In office February 7, 1870 – October 6, 1870
- Lieutenant: Vacant
- Preceded by: Peter T. Washburn
- Succeeded by: John W. Stewart

27th Lieutenant Governor of Vermont
- In office October 15, 1869 – February 7, 1870
- Governor: Peter T. Washburn
- Preceded by: Stephen Thomas
- Succeeded by: George N. Dale

President pro tempore of the Vermont Senate
- In office 1867–1869
- Preceded by: Seneca M. Dorr
- Succeeded by: George N. Dale

Member of the Vermont Senate
- In office 1866–1869
- Preceded by: Samuel M. Pennock
- Succeeded by: Asa R. Camp
- Constituency: Lamoille County

Member of the Vermont House of Representatives
- In office 1861–1863
- Preceded by: Thomas Gleed
- Succeeded by: Samuel M. Pennock
- Constituency: Morristown

State's Attorney of Lamoille County, Vermont
- In office 1857–1859
- Preceded by: John A. Child
- Succeeded by: Reuben C. Benton

Personal details
- Born: November 30, 1832 Stowe, Vermont, US
- Died: December 6, 1906 (aged 74) Morrisville, Vermont, US
- Resting place: Pleasant View Cemetery, Morrisville, Vermont US
- Party: Republican
- Spouses: Millissa Redding (m. 1855; died 1861) Viola S. Bundy (m. 1863; died 1901) Mary Louise Watts Woodbury (m. 1906)
- Profession: Lawyer; Businessman

George Whitman Hendee (November 30, 1832 – December 6, 1906) was a Vermont lawyer, banker, and politician who served as president of the Vermont State Senate, the 27th lieutenant governor, 32nd governor of Vermont, and a U.S. representative.

== Biography ==
Born in Stowe, Vermont, Hendee attended the common schools of Morrisville, Vermont, and People's Academy. He studied law in the office of his uncle Whitman G. Ferrin of Johnson, was admitted to the bar in 1855, and commenced practice in Morrisville, Vermont. On November 17, 1855, he married Millissa Redding, who died in 1861. They had one daughter, who died at age 6. On December 23, 1863, he married Viola S. Bundy, who died in May 1901. He married his third wife, Mary Louise Watts Woodbury, on January 10, 1906.

== Career ==
Hendee served for many years as Superintendent of Schools in Morrisville, Vermont. He was also a director of the Portland and Ogdensburg Railway, president of the Montreal, Portland and Boston Railway, vice president of the Union Savings Bank and Trust Company of Morrisville, and receiver of the National Bank of Poultney and of the Vermont National Bank of St. Albans.

Hendee served as State's Attorney for Lamoille County in 1858 and 1859, and as member of the Vermont House of Representatives from 1861 to 1863. During the Civil War Hendee served as a deputy provost marshal. (Provost marshals were appointed for each state and Congressional district by the federal government, and were responsible for supervising conscription and recruiting activities.)

He served in the Vermont State Senate from 1866 to 1869, and was chosen to serve as Senate President.

Hendee was elected Lieutenant Governor of Vermont in 1869. On February 7, 1870, Governor Peter T. Washburn died; Hendee succeeded to the governorship, and his oath of office was administered by Justice Benjamin H. Steele of the Vermont Supreme Court. He completed the remainder of Washburn's term, which ended on October 3, 1870, but did not run for a full term in 1870.

Republicans, who had won all statewide elections in Vermont since the founding of the party (and would continue to do so until the late 1950s), debated whether Hendee should be a candidate for a full term in 1870. Their first issue was whether the nomination would go to someone from the west side of the Green Mountains, in keeping with the Mountain Rule that had existed since the founding of the party in the mid-1850s, or whether it should go to someone from the east side of the mountains, where Washburn had lived, on the grounds that he had died before his term was complete. Their second issue was that the Mountain Rule had limited Vermont Governors to two one-year terms in office, and 1870 would be the first election for a two-year term. The Republicans planned to revise their Mountain Rule to limit Governors to one two-year term. Should Hendee be nominated, which would mean that he would serve more than two years?

(Under the Mountain Rule, candidates for Governor and Lieutenant Governor were from alternate sides of the Green Mountains, and Governors were limited to two years in office. US Senators were chosen so that one always came from the east side of the mountains and one from the west.)

Republicans resolved these questions by deciding that the nomination should go to someone from the west, in keeping with their regular rotation policy, but that it should go to someone other than Hendee, in order to ensure that no Governor exceeded the two-year limit. As a result, the nomination went to John W. Stewart, who easily won the general election and went on to serve the first two-year term.

Hendee returned to elective office in 1872 when he was elected as a Republican to represent Vermont's 3rd congressional district in the Forty-third Congress, succeeding Worthington C. Smith. He was re-elected to the Forty-fourth and Forty-fifth Congresses, and served from March 4, 1873 to March 3, 1879. In 1874 and 1876, Hendee defeated Democratic nominee John L. Edwards, who had also been the Democratic nominee for governor in 1867 and 1868. In Congress, Hendee served on the committee on private land claims and on the District of Columbia which drafted and secured passage of the law which changed the form of government of the District.

The 3rd District included the six northern counties of Vermont and bridged the Green Mountains. Counting Hendee's three terms, it had been represented by someone from the west side of the mountains for six terms. Because of the Republican Party's desire for someone from the east side of the Green Mountains to have an opportunity to serve, in keeping with the Mountain Rule Hendee did not run in 1878, deferring to William W. Grout. (Grout lost the general election to Bradley Barlow, a Republican running as a "National Republican" with the support of the Greenback Party.) Hendee resumed the practice of law, and took a special interest in the breeding of Morgan horses. He was Vermont's national bank examiner from 1879 to 1885.

== Death ==
Hendee died in Morrisville, Vermont, on December 6, 1906. He is interred at Pleasant View Cemetery in Morrisville.

Party political offices
Preceded by Stephen Thomas	Republican nominee for Lieutenant Governor of Vermont; 1869	Succeeded by George N. Dale
Political offices
Preceded by Stephen Thomas	Lieutenant Governor of Vermont; 1869-1870	Succeeded by George N. Dale
Preceded by Peter T. Washburn	Governor of Vermont; February 7, 1870 – October 6, 1870	Succeeded by John W. Stewart
U.S. House of Representatives
Preceded by Portus Baxter	Member of the U.S. House of Representatives from Vermont's 3rd congressional district 1873-1879	Succeeded by George W. Hendee
