= William E. Lansing =

American politician (1821–1883)

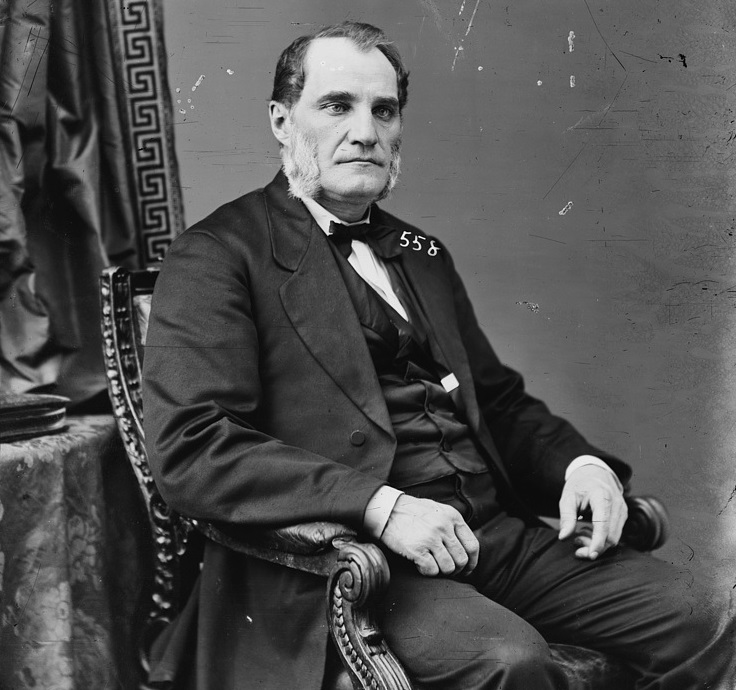
- Lansing, c. 1871

Member of the U.S. House of Representatives from New York
- In office March 4, 1861 – March 3, 1863
- Preceded by: M. Lindley Lee
- Succeeded by: DeWitt C. Littlejohn
- Constituency: 22nd district
- In office March 4, 1871 – March 3, 1875
- Preceded by: John C. Churchill (22nd); R. Holland Duell (23rd)
- Succeeded by: Ellis H. Roberts (22nd); Scott Lord (23rd)
- Constituency: 22nd district (1871-73); 23rd district (1873-75)

County Clerk of Madison County, New York
- In office January 1, 1856 – December 31, 1859
- Preceded by: Lucius P. Clark
- Succeeded by: Charles L. Kennedy

Village President of Chittenango, New York
- In office 1853–1854
- Preceded by: P. D. Harrington
- Succeeded by: George K. Fuller

District Attorney of Madison County, New York
- In office January 1, 1850 – December 31, 1853
- Preceded by: Henry C. Goodwin
- Succeeded by: Asahel C. Stone

Personal details
- Born: December 29, 1821 Perryville, New York, USA
- Died: July 29, 1883 (aged 61) Syracuse, New York, USA
- Resting place: Oakwood Cemetery, Chittenango, New York
- Party: Whig; Republican
- Spouse: Gertrude Brown (m. 1856–1859)
- Children: 2
- Education: Cazenovia Seminary
- Occupation: Attorney

William Esselstyne Lansing (December 29, 1821 – July 29, 1883) was a U.S. representative from New York during the American Civil War.

== Biography ==
Lansing was born in Perryville, New York on December 29, 1821, a son of Abraham Wendell Lansing and Sarah (Holden) Lansing. He attended the local schools and graduated from Cazenovia Seminary in 1841. Lansing studied law in Utica, New York, was admitted to the bar in 1845, and commenced practice in Chittenango, New York.

Entering politics as a Whig, Lansing served as district attorney of Madison County, New York from 1850 to 1853. From 1853 to 1854 he was Chittenango's village president. Lansing served as Madison County Clerk from 1855 to 1858.

In 1860, Lansing was the successful Republican nominee for a seat in the United States House of Representatives. He served one term, March 4, 1861, to March 3, 1863 (the 37th Congress). He was not a candidate for renomination in 1862.

Lansing was elected to the U.S. House again in 1870 and he was reelected in 1872. He served two terms, March 4, 1871, to March 3, 1875 (the 42nd and 43rd Congresses). He was not a candidate for renomination in 1874.

After leaving Congress, Lansing resumed the practice of law in Syracuse, New York. He died in Syracuse on July 29, 1883. Lansing was buried at Oakwood Cemetery in Chittenango.

U.S. House of Representatives
Preceded by R. Holland Duell	Member of the U.S. House of Representatives from New York's 23rd congressional district March 4, 1873 – March 3, 1875	Succeeded by Scott Lord
Preceded by John C. Churchill	Member of the U.S. House of Representatives from New York's 22nd congressional district March 4, 1871 – March 3, 1873	Succeeded by Ellis H. Roberts
Preceded by M. Lindley Lee	Member of the U.S. House of Representatives from New York's 22nd congressional district March 4, 1861 – March 3, 1863	Succeeded by DeWitt Clinton Littlejohn
