= John Bacon (Massachusetts politician) =

American politician, Massachusetts (1738–1820)

Member of the U.S. House of Representatives from Massachusetts's 1st district
- In office March 4, 1801 – March 4, 1803
- Preceded by: Theodore Sedgwick
- Succeeded by: William Eustis

President of the Massachusetts State Senate
- In office 1801–1803

Personal details
- Born: April 5, 1738 Canterbury, Connecticut Colony, British America
- Died: October 25, 1820 (aged 82) Stockbridge, Massachusetts, U.S.
- Resting place: Stockbridge Cemetery
- Party: Democratic-Republican
- Spouse: Elizabeth Goldthwaite
- Children: Ezekiel Bacon
- Education: Princeton

John Bacon (April 5, 1738 – October 25, 1820), was an American politician, judge, and pastor from Massachusetts.

John Bacon was born in Canterbury in the Connecticut Colony on April 5, 1738. Upon graduating from Princeton College he spent some time preaching in Somerset County, Maryland. On September 25, 1771, he and Mr. John Hunt were appointed as colleague pastors over the Old South Church in Boston, Massachusetts. Bacon ran into difficulties with his congregation over doctrinal issues and his preaching style, which was described as "argumentative... approaching the severe." He was dismissed from the Old South Church on February 8, 1775.

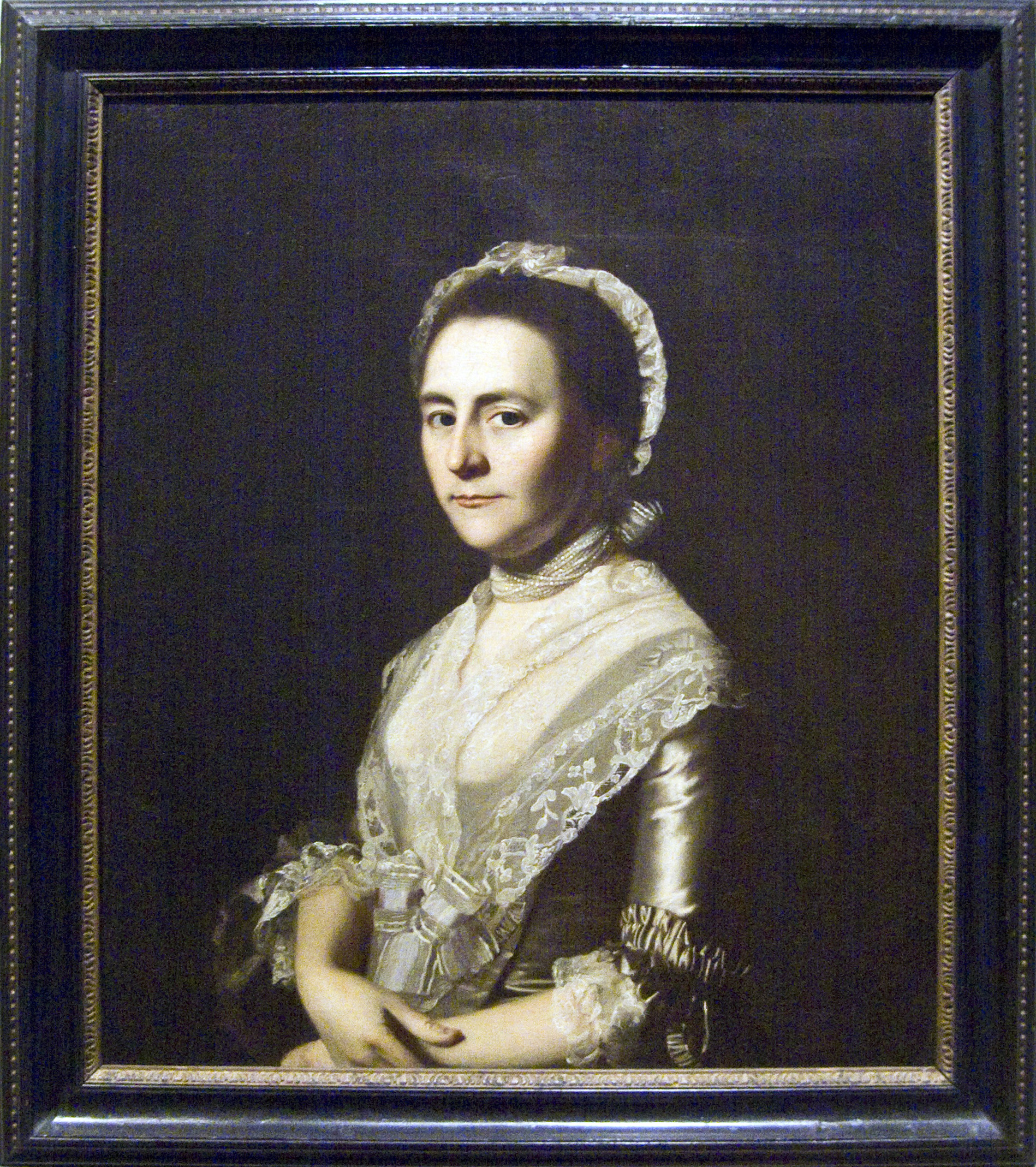
Elizabeth Goldthwaite (Mrs. John Bacon), painted by John Singleton Copley, 1771.

After leaving the church Bacon moved to Stockbridge, Massachusetts. He was a charter member of the American Academy of Arts and Sciences. He served as a Magistrate, Representative, Associate and Presiding Judge of the Common Pleas, Member and President of the State Senate, and Member of Congress.

Bacon served on a committee of safety in 1777 and was a member of the Massachusetts constitutional convention in 1779 and 1780. He alternately served in both chambers of the Massachusetts legislature at various points between 1780 and 1806, becoming the president of the Senate in 1806. In 1788, he was a candidate for the 4th congressional district, and was later elected to represent the 1st congressional district for a single term in 1800 during which he chaired the Committee on Elections. After leaving Congress, he served as presiding judge of the court of common pleas, and was appointed chief justice of the Massachusetts Supreme Judicial Court in 1809.

Bacon married Elizabeth, the widow of Alexander Cumming and daughter of Ezekiel Goldthwait, Register of the Deeds for Suffolk County, and died in Stockbridge, Massachusetts, October 25, 1820. Bacon is interred in the Stockbridge Cemetery. His son, Ezekiel, and grandson, William, also served as congressmen, the latter from New York.

== Sources ==
- United States Congress. "John Bacon (id: B000017)". Biographical Directory of the United States Congress.

U.S. House of Representatives
| Preceded by Theodore Sedgwick | Member of the U.S. House of Representatives from Massachusetts's 1st congressional district 1801–1803 | Succeeded by William Eustis |
