= William J. Bacon =

American politician and judge (1803–1889)

William Johnson Bacon
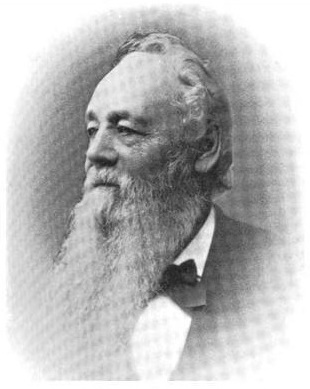

Member of the U.S. House of Representatives from New York's 23rd district
- In office March 4, 1877 – March 3, 1879
- Preceded by: Scott Lord
- Succeeded by: Cyrus D. Prescott

Member of the New York State Assembly from the Oneida County, 4th district
- In office January 1, 1850 – December 31, 1850
- Preceded by: Oliver Prescott
- Succeeded by: Joseph Benedict

Personal details
- Born: February 18, 1803 Williamstown, Massachusetts, U.S.
- Died: July 3, 1889 (aged 86) Utica, New York, U.S.
- Resting place: Forest Hill Cemetery; Utica, New York, U.S.
- Party: Republican
- Spouses: Eliza Kirkland (m. 1828; died 1872) Susan Sloane Gillette (m. 1874)
- Relations: John Bacon (grandfather)
- Parent: Ezekiel Bacon (father)
- Education: Hamilton College; Litchfield Law School
- Profession: Attorney

William Johnson Bacon (February 18, 1803 – July 3, 1889) was an American politician and a U.S. Representative from New York.

== Early life ==
Bacon was born on February 18, 1803, in Williamstown, Massachusetts to Abigail (née Smith) and Ezekiel Bacon. He was the grandson of John Bacon. He moved with his family to Utica, New York, in 1815. He graduated from Hamilton College in 1822. He then studied law at Litchfield Law School and graduated in 1824. Bacon studied for a year in the law office of Joseph and Charles P. Kirkland. He was admitted to the bar in 1824 and began practice in Utica.

== Career ==
Bacon was appointed city attorney of Utica in 1837 and was a member of the New York State Assembly in 1850. He was elected a trustee of Hamilton College in 1851. He was a justice of the New York Supreme Court (5th District) from 1854 to 1870 and was ex officio a judge of the New York Court of Appeals in 1860 and 1868.

Elected as a Republican to the 45th United States Congress, Bacon served as U.S. Representative for the twenty-third district of New York from March 4, 1877 to March 3, 1879. Afterwards, he resumed the practice of law.

== Personal life ==
Bacon married Eliza Kirkland on October 23, 1828 and, subsequent to her death in 1872, he married to Susan Sloan Gillette in 1874.

Bacon died in Utica, Oneida County, New York, on July 3, 1889. He is interred at Forest Hill Cemetery in Utica.

U.S. House of Representatives
Preceded by Scott Lord	Member of the U.S. House of Representatives from New York's 23rd congressional district March 4, 1877, to March 3, 1879	Succeeded by Cyrus D. Prescott
