= Thomas Turner (Kentucky politician) =

American politician

Thomas Turner (September 10, 1821 in Richmond, Kentucky – September 11, 1900 in Mount Sterling, Kentucky) was an American politician. Between 1877 and 1881 he represented the state of Kentucky in the U.S. House of Representatives.

== Career ==
Thomas Turner first attended the Richmond Academy and then the Centre College in Danville in 1840. After a subsequent law degree from Transylvania Law School in Lexington and his 1842 admission to the bar, he began practicing law in Richmond. From 1845 to 1846 he worked as a prosecutor. He was a soldier during the Mexican–American War. In November 1854, Turner moved to Mount Sterling, where he practiced law. Between 1861 and 1863 he served as a Democrat in the United States House of Representatives for Kentucky.

Turner was elected in 1876 to represent the ninth district of Kentucky in the U.S. House of Representatives, succeeding Republican John D. White. After being re-elected in 1878, he was defeated by in 1880 by his predecessor, White. After leaving Congress, Turner retired from politics. In the following years he worked as a lawyer again. He died in Mount Sterling.

U.S. House of Representatives
Preceded by John D. White	Member of the U.S. House of Representatives from Kentucky's 9th congressional district March 4, 1877 – March 3, 1881	Succeeded by John D. White
