= Bradley Barlow =

American politician

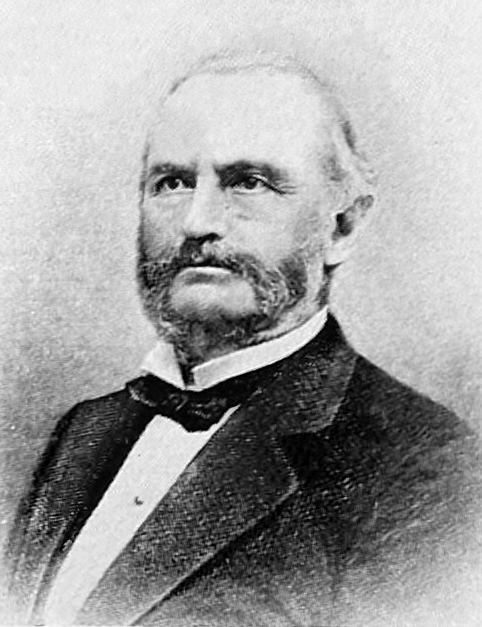

Member of the United States House of Representatives from Vermont's 3rd district
- In office March 4, 1879 – March 3, 1881
- Preceded by: George Whitman Hendee
- Succeeded by: William W. Grout

Member of the Vermont House of Representatives
- In office 1845; 1850–1852; 1864–1865

Personal details
- Born: May 12, 1814 Fairfield, Vermont, United States
- Died: November 6, 1889 (aged 75) Denver, Colorado, United States
- Resting place: Greenwood Cemetery, St. Albans, Vermont
- Party: Greenbacker
- Spouse: Caroline Farnsworth
- Children: Deborah Barlow, Helen K. Barlow, Joanna F. Barlow, Laura Barlow, Charlotte Barlow and Anna Barlow
- Profession: Politician, Banker

Bradley Barlow (May 12, 1814 – November 6, 1889) was a nineteenth-century banker and politician who served as a U.S. Representative from Vermont for one term from 1879 to 1881.

== Early life and career ==
Barlow was born in Fairfield, Vermont, son of Colonel Bradley and Deborah (Sherman) Barlow. Barlow attended the common schools and then engaged in mercantile pursuits in Philadelphia with his father until 1858, when he moved to St. Albans, Vermont. Barlow began his banking career in St. Albans as a cashier.

Originally a Democrat, and later a Republican, Barlow was a delegate to the Vermont State constitutional conventions in 1843, 1850, and 1857, and was acting assistant secretary in 1843. He was a member of the Vermont House of Representatives in 1845, 1850 to 1852, 1864, and 1865. He engaged in banking and in the railroad business from 1860 to 1883. He was chairman of the school committee in St. Albans and president of the village corporation and treasurer of Franklin County from 1860 to 1867. Barlow served in the Vermont Senate from 1866 to 1868. In 1878 he was a candidate for the Republican nomination for Congress at a time when Vermont elected only Republicans to statewide and national office, and lost to William W. Grout. Barlow then ran as a "National Republican" with Democratic and Greenbacker support and won the general election, serving in the Forty-sixth United States Congress, March 4, 1879 to March 3, 1881. He was not a candidate for renomination in 1880, and began to suffer business setbacks, largely engineered by Republicans including former Governor J. Gregory Smith, who were part of Vermont's business and banking community and resented Barlow's insurgency against the dominant Republican hierarchy.

== Scandals ==
Barlow was implicated in the star routes mail scandal of 1876 in which he was identified as one of the most successful mail contractors in the country.

He was called to testify before Congress several times regarding the scandal. One of his first was in 1876, where he was accused of bribing Congress in 1872 with $40,000 to stop the initial investigation of the forty-second congress.

== Later years ==
Barlow was President of the Vermont National Bank in St. Albans when it failed in 1883 as a result of an unsuccessful attempt to sell his South Eastern Railway of Canada and an economic downturn. He declared bankruptcy, assigned all of his personal property to the bank and reported that he was penniless. The bank failure had severe repercussions for the town. He was also accused of refusing to pay Vermont state taxes that year.

In 1885, a judge in Montreal, Quebec, Canada rendered a judgment against Barlow and others for $1,550,929 for unrecovered promissory notes relating to the South Eastern Railway.

His house, known as Villa Barlow, was taken over by the Congregation of Notre Dame based in Montreal, which had established a convent and school in St. Albans in 1869. In 1903 the American-born Eliza Healy, whose mother was a slave in Georgia, was appointed mother superior at the convent and school, both of which she managed for 15 years.

Barlow later lived in Denver, Colorado with one of his daughters. He died in Denver on November 6, 1889, and was interred in Greenwood Cemetery in St. Albans, Vermont.

== Personal life ==
In 1837 he married Caroline Farnsworth. They had six children.

U.S. House of Representatives
Preceded by George W. Hendee	Member of the U.S. House of Representatives from Vermont's 3rd congressional district 1879-1881	Succeeded by William W. Grout
