= John T. Spriggs =

American politician (1825–1888)

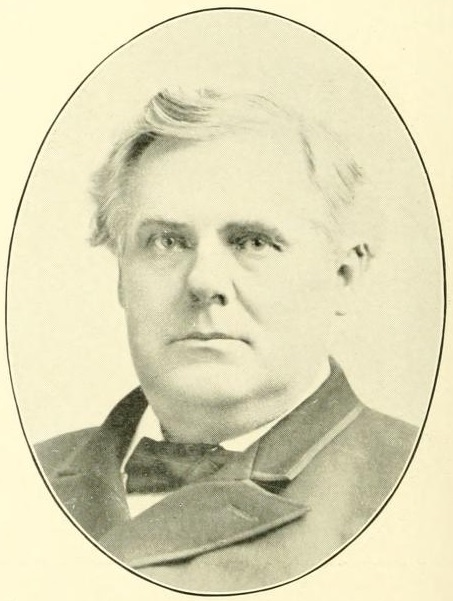

Member of the U.S. House of Representatives from New York's 23rd district
- In office March 4, 1883 – March 3, 1887
- Preceded by: Cyrus D. Prescott
- Succeeded by: James S. Sherman

Mayor of Utica, New York
- In office 1880–1880
- Preceded by: John Buckley
- Succeeded by: James Miller
- In office 1868–1868
- Preceded by: Charles S. Wilson
- Succeeded by: Ephraim Chamberlain

Personal details
- Born: John Thomas Spriggs; April 5, 1825 Peterborough, England
- Died: December 23, 1888 (aged 63) Utica, New York
- Resting place: Whitesboro Cemetery
- Party: Democratic
- Education: Hamilton College

John Thomas Spriggs (April 5, 1825 – December 23, 1888) was an American lawyer and politician who served two terms as a U.S. representative from New York from 1883 to 1887.

== Biography ==
Born in Peterborough, England, Spriggs immigrated to the United States with his parents, who settled in Whitesboro, New York, in 1836. He attended Hamilton College, and graduated from Union College in 1848.

He studied law and was admitted to the bar in 1848 and began practice in Whitesboro. He became prosecuting attorney of Oneida County in 1853, and county treasurer in 1854. He served two non-consecutive terms as mayor of Utica, New York, in 1868 and 1880, and as delegate to the Democratic National Convention in 1860, 1872 and 1880.

=== Congress ===
Spriggs was elected as a Democrat to the Forty-eighth and Forty-ninth Congresses (March 4, 1883 – March 3, 1887). He served as chairman of the Committee on Accounts (Forty-ninth Congress). He was an unsuccessful candidate for reelection in 1886 to the Fiftieth Congress.

=== Later career and death ===
After leaving Congress, he resumed the practice of law.

He died in Utica on December 23, 1888, and was buried in Whitesboro Cemetery in Whitesboro.

== Sources ==
- United States Congress. "John T. Spriggs (id: S000754)". Biographical Directory of the United States Congress.

U.S. House of Representatives
| Preceded by Cyrus D. Prescott | Member of the U.S. House of Representatives from New York's 23rd congressional district March 4, 1883 – March 3, 1887 | Succeeded by James S. Sherman |
