= Cyrus D. Prescott =

American politician

Cyrus Dan Prescott
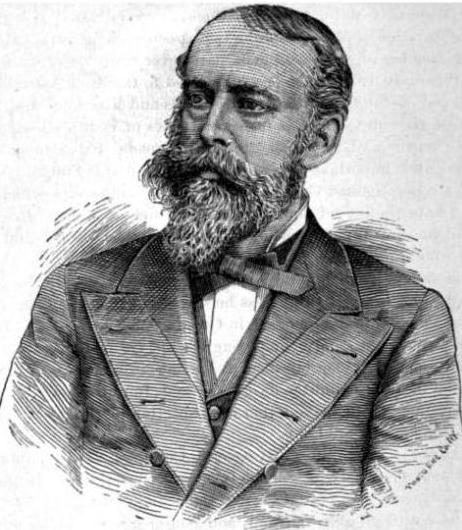

Member of the United States House of Representatives
- In office March 4, 1879 – March 3, 1883
- Preceded by: William J. Bacon
- Succeeded by: John T. Spriggs
- Constituency: New York's 23rd congressional district

Member of the New York State Assembly
- In office January 1, 1878 – December 31, 1878
- Preceded by: Benjamin D. Stone
- Succeeded by: Thomas D. Penfield
- Constituency: Oneida County's 3rd assembly district

Personal details
- Born: August 15, 1836 New Hartford, New York, US
- Died: October 23, 1902 (aged 66) Rome, New York, US
- Resting place: Sauquoit Valley Cemetery, Clayville, New York, US
- Party: Republican
- Spouse: Eliza F. Cady (m. 1867)
- Children: 4
- Education: Utica Free Academy
- Profession: Attorney

Cyrus Dan Prescott (August 15, 1836 – October 23, 1902) was a U.S. Representative from New York.

Prescott was born in New Hartford, New York on August 15, 1836, a son of Jeremiah Prescott and Deborah (Linman) Prescott. He attended the local schools and graduated from Utica Free Academy. Prescott then studied law in Utica and Rome. He was admitted to the bar in 1859 and commenced practice in Rome in 1860.

In 1867, Prescott moved to New York City in 1867 and was employed as a financial clerk in a wholesale house. He returned to Rome in 1868 and continued the practice of law. He served as a member of Rome's board of aldermen from 1874 to 1876. A Republican, he was a member of the New York State Assembly (Oneida Co., 3rd D.) in 1878.

Prescott was elected to the United States House of Representatives in 1878. He was reelected in 1880, and served two terms, March 4, 1879 to March 3, 1883 (the 46th and 47th Congresses). He was not a candidate for renomination in 1882.

After leaving Congress, Prescott resumed the practice of law in Rome. He specialized in railroad and corporate practice, and was the attorney for the New York Central Railroad for over thirty years.

Prescott died in Rome on October 23, 1902. He was buried at Sauquoit Valley Cemetery, near Clayville, New York.

== Sources ==
- United States Congress. "Cyrus D. Prescott (id: P000512)". Biographical Directory of the United States Congress.

U.S. House of Representatives
| Preceded by William J. Bacon | Member of the U.S. House of Representatives from New York's 23rd congressional district March 4, 1879 – March 3, 1883 | Succeeded by John T. Spriggs |
New York State Assembly
| Preceded by Benjamin D. Stone | New York State Assembly; Oneida County, 3rd District; January 1, 1878 – December 31, 1878 | Succeeded by Thomas D. Penfield |
