= William W. Grout =

American politician

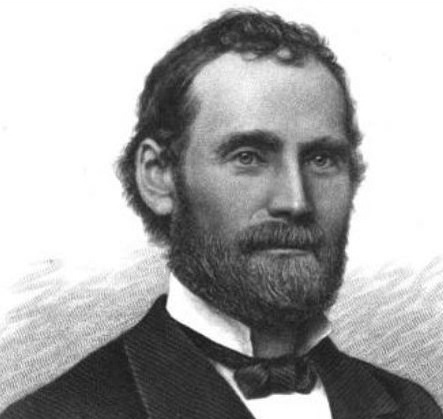

Member of the U.S. House of Representatives from Vermont's 2nd district
- In office March 4, 1885 – March 3, 1901
- Preceded by: Luke P. Poland
- Succeeded by: Kittredge Haskins

Member of the U.S. House of Representatives from Vermont's 3rd district
- In office March 4, 1881 – March 3, 1883
- Preceded by: Bradley Barlow
- Succeeded by: District eliminated

Member of the Vermont Senate from Orleans County
- In office 1876–1878 Serving with Charles Carpenter
- Preceded by: Henderson C. Wilson; Henry S. Tolman
- Succeeded by: Isaac N. Cushman; Benjamin F. Paine

Member of the Vermont House of Representatives from Barton
- In office 1874–1876
- Preceded by: Charles E. Joslyn
- Succeeded by: George H. Blake
- In office 1868–1870
- Preceded by: H. P. Cushing
- Succeeded by: Charles E. Joslyn

Personal details
- Born: William Wallace Grout; May 24, 1836 Compton, Lower Canada (now Quebec)
- Died: October 7, 1902 (aged 66) Kirby, Vermont, US
- Resting place: Grove Cemetery in Saint Johnsbury, Vermont
- Party: Republican
- Spouse: Loraine M. Smith Grout
- Relations: Josiah Grout (brother)
- Education: State and National Law School
- Profession: Attorney

Military service
- Allegiance: United States (Union)
- Branch/service: Union Army; Vermont Militia
- Years of service: 1862–1866
- Rank: Lieutenant colonel (army); Brigadier general (militia)
- Unit: 15th Vermont Volunteer Infantry Regiment
- Commands: 2nd Brigade, 1st Division, Vermont Militia
- Battles/wars: American Civil War

William Wallace Grout (May 24, 1836 – October 7, 1902) was an American lawyer, Civil War veteran, and politician. He served as a U.S. representative from Vermont.

== Biography ==
Grout was born in Compton in Lower Canada (now Quebec), the son of Josiah and Sophronia (Ayer) Grout. His parents, native Vermonters, returned to that state when he was thirteen. Grout pursued an academic course, he attended St. Johnsbury Academy and graduated from the State and National Law School in Poughkeepsie, New York, in 1857. He was admitted to the bar in December of the same year and began the practice of law in Barton, Vermont.

=== Civil War ===
In 1862, Grout was nominated as State's Attorney of Orleans County but declined, deciding instead to enter the army. In July 1862 he received his commission as lieutenant colonel of the 15th Vermont Volunteer Infantry Regiment in the Union Army during the Civil War. He later attained the rank of brigadier general as commander of one of three brigades organized for border defense by the Vermont State Legislature following the St. Albans Raid.

After the war, he was elected as a companion of the District of Columbia Commandery of the Military Order of the Loyal Legion of the United States.

=== Early political career ===
Grout served as State's Attorney of Orleans County in 1865 and 1866. In 1868 he was a delegate to Republican National Convention from Vermont. He served in the Vermont House of Representatives from 1868 until 1870 and in 1874. In 1876 he was a member of the Vermont State Senate and served as President pro tempore.

=== Congress ===
Grout was elected as a Republican Congressman to the Forty-seventh Congress from Vermont's 3rd congressional district, serving from March 4, 1881, until March 3, 1883. The 3rd District was eliminated at the end of his term. He was an unsuccessful candidate for Vermont's 2nd congressional district in 1882 to the Forty-eighth Congress.

Grout was elected to the Forty-ninth from the 2nd Vermont District and to the seven succeeding Congresses, serving from March 4, 1885, until March 3, 1901. He served as chairman of the Committee on the District of Columbia in the Fifty-first Congress, and was on the Committee on Expenditures in the Department of War in the Fifty-fourth through the Fifty-sixth Congresses.

From 1881 until 1888, Grout's law practice included Willard W. Miles as his partner; when Grout withdrew in 1888 so that he could concentrate his full-time efforts on his Congressional career, Miles continued the practice alone.

=== Later career and death ===
After leaving Congress, he engaged in agricultural pursuits and the practice of law. Grout died on October 7, 1902, and is interred in Grove Cemetery in Saint Johnsbury, Vermont.

== Personal life ==
Grout was the second child of ten, the eldest of five sons. Seven of the children were born in the Compton house. There were no finished chambers in the Compton house. In winter, awakening to snow on the bed was a common experience.

The family moved to Kirby, Vermont, from Compton.

Grout married Loraine M. Smith in 1860, and they had two children who died while in infancy. Loraine died in 1868.

Grout's brother Josiah Grout, was the Speaker of the Vermont House of Representatives and was the 46th governor of Vermont.

His nephew Aaron H. Grout, the son of Josiah Grout, served as Vermont Secretary of State from 1923 to 1927.

Political offices
Preceded by Redfield Proctor	President pro tempore of the Vermont State Senate; 1876 – 1878	Succeeded by Loveland Munson
U.S. House of Representatives
Preceded by Bradley Barlow	Member of the U.S. House of Representatives from Vermont's 3rd congressional district 1881-1883	Succeeded by District eliminated
Preceded by Luke P. Poland	Member of the U.S. House of Representatives from Vermont's 2nd congressional district 1885-1901	Succeeded by Kittredge Haskins
