= 1880 United States House of Representatives elections =

House elections for the 47th U.S. Congress

- June 1, 1880 – November 2, 1880

All 293 seats in the United States House of Representatives 147 seats needed for a majority
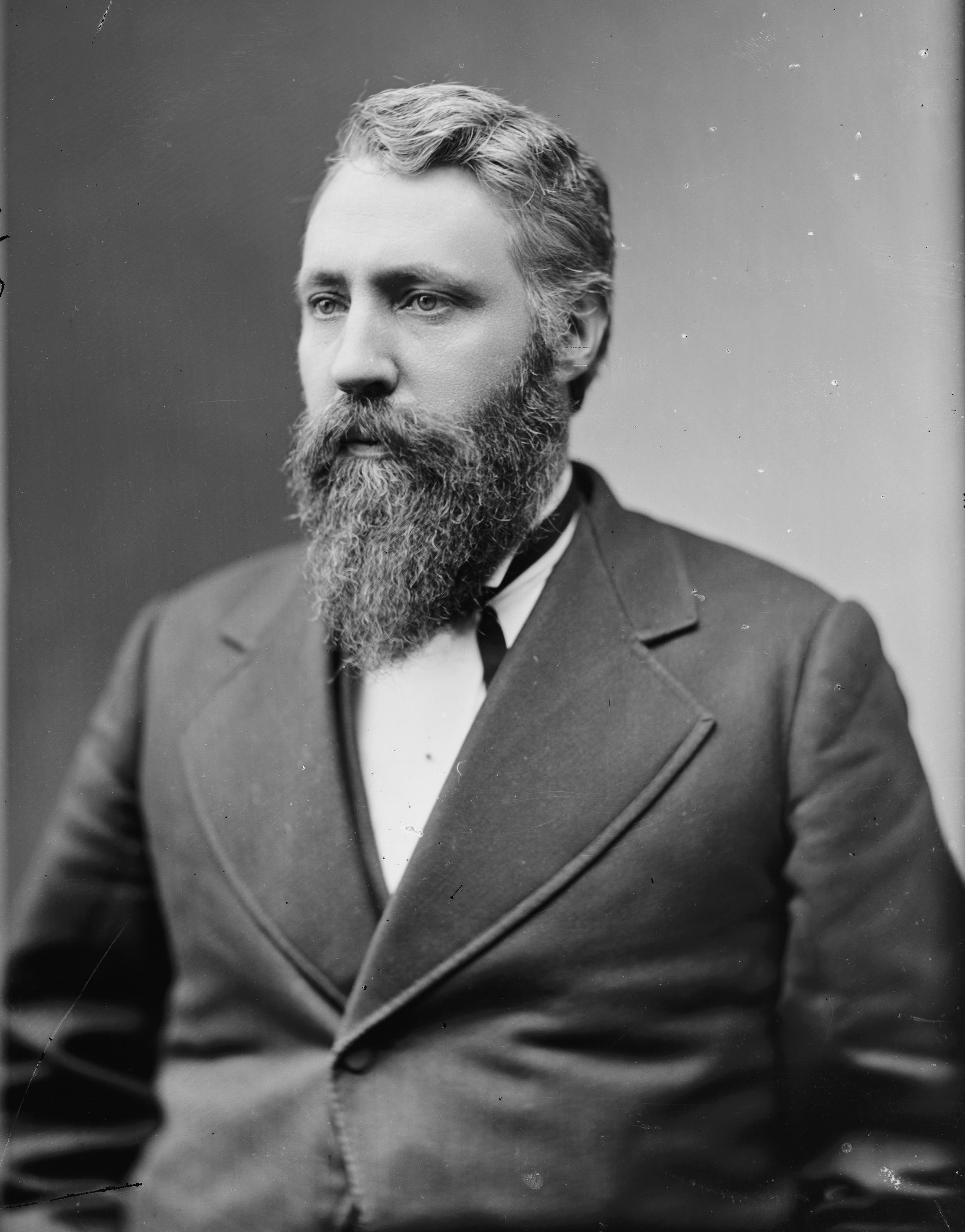

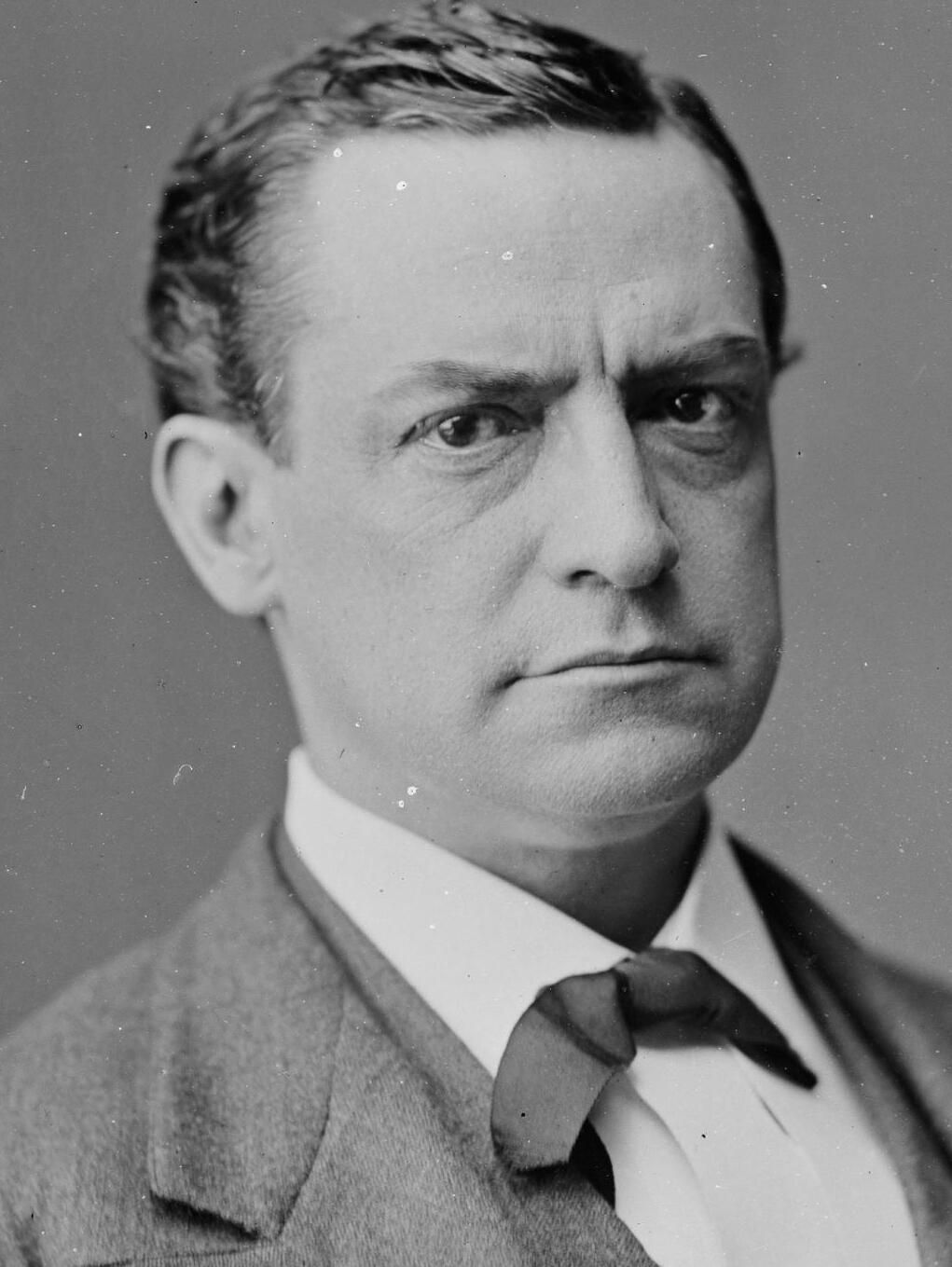
	Majority party	Minority party
Leader	Joseph Keifer	Samuel Randall
Party	Republican	Democratic
Leader's seat	Ohio 4th	Pennsylvania 3rd
Last election	132 seats	141 seats
Seats won	151 (Note: Dubin counts 147 Republicans, 135 Democrats, 2 Readjusters, 1 Independent Democrat, and 8 Greenbacks at the start of the 47th United States Congress.)	128
Seat change	▲19	▼13
Popular vote	4,080,609	4,330,113
Percentage	44.94%	47.68%
Swing	▲5.38pp	▲3.48pp
	Third party	Fourth party
Party	Greenback	Readjuster
Last election	13 seats	0 seats
Seats won	10	2
Seat change	▼3	▲2
Popular vote	504,097	56,058
Percentage	5.55%	0.62%
Swing	▼6.74pp	New party
	Fifth party
Party	Independent
Last election	7 seats (Note: Includes 7 Independent Democrats.)
Seats won	2 (Note: Includes 1 Independent Democrat elected in Georgia.)
Seat change	▼5
Popular vote	99,511
Percentage	1.10%
Swing	▼1.65pp
- Results; Democratic gain Democratic hold Republican gain Republican hold Independent gain Independent hold Greenback gain Greenback hold Readjuster gain
Speaker before election
Samuel Randall
Democratic
Elected Speaker
Joseph Keifer
Republican

The 1880 United States House of Representatives elections were held for the most part on November 2, 1880, with five states holding theirs early between June and October. They coincided with the 1880 presidential election which was won by James A. Garfield, who was a member of the House at the time. Elections were held for 293 seats of the United States House of Representatives, representing 38 states, to serve in the 47th United States Congress. This was the first time that every state held their regular House elections on or before Election Day. Special elections were also held throughout the year.

Issues such as Civil War loyalties, tariffs, graft and corruption dominated the year's elections, though none became substantive as a national issue. The economy was growing stronger after emerging from a long Depression. It was in this political environment that Garfield's Republican Party gained 19 seats and regained control of the House from the Democratic Party. The Greenback Party, an emerging party of workers and farmers, also lost seats in these elections, after gaining more than a dozen two years earlier.

== Election summaries ==
↓
131	10	151
Democratic	Gb	Republican

State	Type	Total seats	Democratic		Greenback		Republican	
State	Type	Total seats	Seats	Change	Seats	Change	Seats	Change
Alabama	District	8	6	▼1	1	Steady	1	▲1
Arkansas	District	4	4	Steady	0	Steady	0	Steady
California	District	4	2	▲1	0	Steady	2	▼1
Colorado	At-large	1	0	Steady	0	Steady	1	Steady
Connecticut	District	4	1	Steady	0	Steady	3	Steady
Delaware	At-large	1	1	Steady	0	Steady	0	Steady
Florida	District	2	1	Steady	0	Steady	1	Steady
Georgia	District	9	9	Steady	0	Steady	0	Steady
Illinois	District	19	6	Steady	0	▼1	13	▲1
Indiana	District	13	5	▼1	0	Steady	8	▲2
Iowa	District	9	1	▲1	0	▼2	8	▲1
Kansas	District	3	0	Steady	0	Steady	3	Steady
Kentucky	District	10	9	▼1	0	Steady	1	▲1
Louisiana	District	6	5	▼1	0	Steady	1	▲1
Maine (Note: Elections held early.)	District	5	0	Steady	2	Steady	3	Steady
Maryland	District	6	5	Steady	0	Steady	1	Steady
Massachusetts	District	11	1	Steady	0	Steady	10	Steady
Michigan	District	9	0	Steady	0	Steady	9	Steady
Minnesota	District	3	0	▼1	0	Steady	3	▲1
Mississippi	District	6	5	▼1	0	Steady	1	▲1
Missouri	District	13	7	▼5	4	▲3	2	▲2
Nebraska	At-large	1	0	Steady	0	Steady	1	Steady
Nevada	At-large	1	1	▲1	0	Steady	0	▼1
New Hampshire	District	3	0	Steady	0	Steady	3	Steady
New Jersey	District	7	3	Steady	0	Steady	4	Steady
New York	District	33 (Note: 1 Independent, J. Hyatt Smith elected to the 3rd district.)	12	▲3	0	Steady	20	▼4
North Carolina	District	8	7	▲1	0	▼1	1	Steady
Ohio	District	20	5	▼6	0	Steady	15	▲6
Oregon	At-large	1	0	▼1	0	Steady	1	▲1
Pennsylvania	District	27	7	▼1	2	Steady	18	▲1
Rhode Island	District	2	0	Steady	0	Steady	2	Steady
South Carolina	District	5	4	▼1	0	Steady	1	▲1
Tennessee	District	10	7	▼2	0	Steady	3	▲2
Texas	District	6	5	Steady	1	Steady	0	Steady
Vermont	District	3	0	Steady	0	▼1	3	▲1
Virginia	District	9	7 (Note: Includes 2 Readjuster Democrats, elected to the 7th district and 9th district.)	▼1	0	Steady	2	▲1
West Virginia	District	3	3	Steady	0	Steady	0	Steady
Wisconsin	District	8	2	▼1	0	Steady	6	▲1
Total		293	131 44.7%	▼13	10 3.4%	▼4	151 51.5%	▲16

Popular vote
Democratic	47.68%
Republican	44.94%
Greenback	5.55%
Readjuster	0.62%
Independent	1.10%
Others	0.11%

House seats
Republican	51.54%
Democratic	43.69%
Greenback	3.42%
Readjuster	0.68%
Independent	0.68%

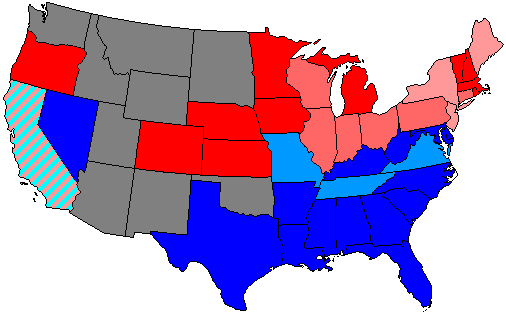
House seats by party holding plurality in state: 80+% to 100% Democratic / 80+% to 100% Republican; 60+% to 80% Democratic / 60+% to 80% Republican; Up to 60% Democratic / Up to 60% Republican

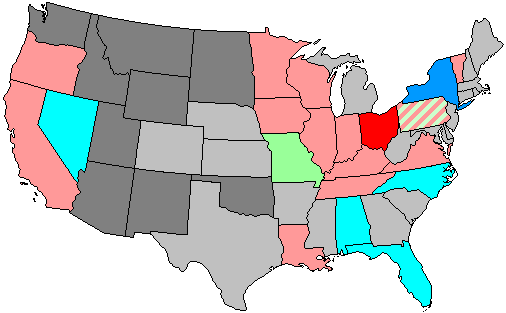
Net gain in party representation: 6+ Democratic gain / / 6+ Republican gain; 3-5 Democratic gain / 3-5 Greenback gain / 3-5 Republican gain; 1-2 Democratic gain / 1-2 Greenback gain / 1-2 Republican gain; no net change

== Early election dates ==
In 1845, Congress passed a law providing for a uniform nationwide date for choosing Presidential electors. This law did not affect election dates for Congress, which remained within the jurisdiction of State governments, but over time, the States moved their Congressional elections to this date as well.

In 1880, no states held their elections after Election Day for the first time (California was the last state to hold late elections, in 1878). But 5 states, with 35 seats among them, held their elections before the rest of the states:

- June 1 Texas
- June 7 Oregon
- September 7 Vermont
- September 13 Maine
- October 12 Ohio

== Special elections ==
=== 46th Congress ===
District	Incumbent			This race	
District	Member	Party	First elected	Results	Candidates
Missouri 7	Alfred M. Lay	Democratic	1878	Incumbent died December 8, 1879. New member elected January 10, 1880 and seated January 26, 1880. Democratic hold. Winner lost re-election to the next term; see below.	▌ ✓ John F. Philips (Democratic) 53.62%; ▌Joseph W. McClurg (Republican) 36.20%; ▌William C. Alldridge (Greenback) 10.18%
New York 32	Ray V. Pierce	Republican	1878	Incumbent resigned September 18, 1880. New member elected November 2, 1880 and seated December 6, 1880. Democratic gain. Winner was also elected to the next term; see below.	▌ ✓ Jonathan Scoville (Democratic) 50.06%; ▌Myron R. Bush (Republican) 49.17%; ▌William S. Smith (Greenback) 0.77%
Alabama 6	Burwell B. Lewis	Democratic	1874; 1876 (Lost); 1878	Incumbent resigned October 1, 1880, to become President of the University of Alabama. New member elected in 1880 and seated December 8, 1880. Democratic hold. Winner was not a candidate for the next term; see below.	▌ ✓ Newton N. Clements (Democratic); Unopposed
Ohio 19	James A. Garfield	Republican	1862	Incumbent resigned November 8, 1880, to become U.S. president. New member elected November 30, 1880 and seated December 13, 1880. Republican hold. Winner had already been elected to the next term; see below.	▌ ✓ Ezra B. Taylor (Republican) 89.99%; ▌Charles D. Adams (Democratic) 9.15%
New Hampshire 3	Evarts Worcester Farr	Republican	1878	Incumbent died November 30, 1880. New member elected December 28, 1880 and seated January 8, 1881. Republican hold. Winner was also elected to the next term.	▌ ✓ Ossian Ray (Republican) 64.17%; ▌Jewett D. Hosley (Democratic) 34.82%; Others 1.01%

=== 47th Congress ===
District	Incumbent			This race	
District	Member	Party	First elected	Results	Candidates
New Hampshire 3	Evarts Worcester Farr	Republican	1878	Incumbent member-elect died November 30, 1880, having just been re-elected. New member elected December 28, 1880. Republican hold. Winner was also elected to finish the current term.	▌ ✓ Ossian Ray (Republican) 65.18%; ▌Jewett D. Hosley (Democratic) 34.82%

== Alabama ==
District	Incumbent			This race	
District	Member	Party	First elected	Results	Candidates
Alabama 1	Thomas H. Herndon	Democratic	1878	Incumbent re-elected.	▌ ✓ Thomas H. Herndon (Democratic) 53.78%; ▌James Gillett (Republican) 30.01%; ▌Frank H. Threatt (Independent) 12.35%; ▌George M. Mott (Greenback) 3.86%
Alabama 2	Hilary A. Herbert	Democratic	1876	Incumbent re-elected.	▌ ✓ Hilary A. Herbert (Democratic) 59.76%; ▌Paul Strobach (Republican) 40.01%
Alabama 3	William J. Samford	Democratic	1878	Incumbent retired. Democratic hold.	▌ ✓ William C. Oates (Democratic) 65.04%; ▌A. A. Mabson (Republican) 34.54%
Alabama 4	Charles M. Shelley	Democratic	1876	Incumbent lost re-election. Republican gain.	▌ ✓ James Q. Smith (Republican) 52.53%; ▌Charles M. Shelley (Democratic) 39.74%; ▌William J. Stevens (Republican) 7.73%
Alabama 5	Thomas Williams	Democratic	1878	Incumbent re-elected.	▌ ✓ Thomas Williams (Democratic); Unopposed
Alabama 6	Newton N. Clements	Democratic	1880 (special)	Incumbent retired. Democratic hold.	▌ ✓ Goldsmith W. Hewitt (Democratic); Unopposed
Alabama 7	William H. Forney	Democratic	1874	Incumbent re-elected.	▌ ✓ William H. Forney (Democratic) 71.37%; ▌Arthur Bingham (Republican) 28.63%
Alabama 8	William M. Lowe	Greenback	1878	Incumbent re-elected.	▌ ✓ William M. Lowe (Greenback) 51.63%; ▌Joseph Wheeler (Democratic) 48.38%

== Arkansas ==
District	Incumbent			This race	
District	Member	Party	First elected	Results	Candidates
Arkansas 1	Poindexter Dunn	Democratic	1878	Incumbent re-elected.	▌ ✓ Poindexter Dunn (Democratic) 60.2%; ▌John R. Johnson (Republican) 39.8%
Arkansas 2	William F. Slemons	Democratic	1874	Incumbent retired. Democratic hold.	▌ ✓ James K. Jones (Democratic) 47.3%; ▌Jonathan W. Williams (Republican) 41.5%; ▌Rufus King Garland Jr. (Greenback) 11.2%
Arkansas 3	Jordan E. Cravens	Democratic	1876	Incumbent re-elected.	▌ ✓ Jordan E. Cravens (Democratic) 57.7%; ▌Thomas Boles (Republican) 42.3%
Arkansas 4	Thomas M. Gunter	Democratic	1872	Incumbent re-elected.	▌ ✓ Thomas M. Gunter (Democratic) 42.8%; ▌Samuel West Peel (Ind. Democratic) 33.2%; ▌Samuel Murphy (Republican) 23.9%

== California ==
District	Incumbent			This race	
District	Member	Party	First elected	Results	Candidates
California 1	Horace Davis	Republican	1876	Incumbent lost re-election. Democratic gain.	▌ ✓ William Rosecrans (Democratic) 51%; ▌Horace Davis (Republican) 47.3%; ▌Stephen Maybell (Greenback) 1.7%
California 2	Horace F. Page	Republican	1872	Incumbent re-elected.	▌ ✓ Horace F. Page (Republican) 53.6%; ▌John R. Glascock (Democratic) 45.7%; ▌Benjamin Todd (Greenback) 0.7%
California 3	Campbell Polson Berry	Democratic	1879	Incumbent re-elected.	▌ ✓ Campbell Polson Berry (Democratic) 51.1%; ▌George A. Knight (Republican) 48.2%; ▌A. Musselman (Greenback) 0.6%
California 4	Romualdo Pacheco	Republican	1876	Incumbent re-elected.	▌ ✓ Romualdo Pacheco (Republican) 45.8%; ▌Wallace Leach (Democratic) 45.3%; ▌J. F. Godfrey (Greenback) 8.9%

== Colorado ==
District	Incumbent			This race	
District	Member	Party	First elected	Results	Candidates
Colorado at-large	James B. Belford	Republican	1878	Incumbent re-elected.	▌ ✓ James B. Belford (Republican) 50.8%; ▌Robert S. Morrison (Democratic) 46.0%; ▌Joseph Murray (Greenback) 3.2%

== Connecticut ==
District	Incumbent			This race	
District	Member	Party	First elected	Results	Candidates
Connecticut 1	Joseph R. Hawley	Republican	1878	Incumbent retired when elected U.S. senator. Republican hold.	▌ ✓ John R. Buck (Republican) 52.6%; ▌George Beach (Democratic) 46.7%; ▌George W. Hewith (Greenback) 0.6%; ▌Horace Johnson (Prohibition) 0.2%
Connecticut 2	James Phelps	Democratic	1875	Incumbent re-elected.	▌ ✓ James Phelps (Democratic) 51.7%; ▌Thomas Wallace (Republican) 48.0%; ▌Calvin S. Harrington (Prohibition) 0.3%
Connecticut 3	John T. Wait	Republican	1876 (special)	Incumbent re-elected.	▌ ✓ John T. Wait (Republican) 65.1%; ▌Marvin H. Sanger (Democratic) 33.7%; ▌Elisha H. Palmer (Prohibition) 0.7%; ▌Albert G. Wolfe (Greenback) 0.5%
Connecticut 4	Frederick Miles	Republican	1878	Incumbent re-elected.	▌ ✓ Frederick Miles (Republican) 50.4%; ▌George W. Peet (Democratic) 48.9%; ▌F. E. Cleveland (Greenback) 0.6%; ▌Ambrose S. Rogers (Prohibition) 0.1%

== Delaware ==
District	Incumbent			This race	
District	Member	Party	First elected	Results	Candidates
Delaware at-large	Edward L. Martin	Democratic	1878	Incumbent re-elected.	▌ ✓ Edward L. Martin (Democratic) 50.85%; ▌John W. Houston (Republican) 48.71%

== Florida ==
District	Incumbent			This race	
District	Member	Party	First elected	Results	Candidates
Florida 1	Robert H. M. Davidson	Democratic	1876	Incumbent re-elected.	▌ ✓ Robert H. M. Davidson (Democratic) 57.2%; ▌George Washington Witherspoon (Republican) 42.3%; ▌Livingston W. Bethel (Independent) 0.5%
Florida 2	Noble A. Hull	Democratic	1878	Incumbent retired. Democratic hold.	▌ ✓ Jesse J. Finley (Democratic) 52.3%; ▌Horatio Bisbee Jr. (Republican) 47.7%
Florida 2	Noble A. Hull	Democratic	1878	Election successfully contested. New member seated June 1, 1882. Republican gain.	▌ ✓ Horatio Bisbee Jr. (Republican) 50.8%; ▌Jesse J. Finley (Democratic) 49.2%

== Georgia ==
District	Incumbent			This race	
District	Member	Party	First elected	Results	Candidates
Georgia 1	John C. Nicholls	Democratic	1878	Incumbent lost renomination. Democratic hold.	▌ ✓ George R. Black (Democratic) 64.4%; ▌Jonathan F. Collins (Republican) 35.6%
Georgia 2	William E. Smith	Democratic	1874	Incumbent retired. Democratic hold.	▌ ✓ Henry G. Turner (Democratic) 64.6%; ▌Benjamin F. Brimberry (Republican) 35.4%
Georgia 3	Philip Cook	Democratic	1872	Incumbent re-elected.	▌ ✓ Philip Cook (Democratic) 68.7%; ▌S. Wise Parker (Republican) 31.3%
Georgia 4	Henry Persons	Independent Democratic	1878	Incumbent retired. Democratic gain.	▌ ✓ Hugh Buchanan (Democratic) 58.0%; ▌Joseph F. Pou (Ind. Democratic) 42.0%
Georgia 5	Nathaniel J. Hammond	Democratic	1878	Incumbent re-elected.	▌ ✓ Nathaniel J. Hammond (Democratic) 62.6%; ▌W. S. Clark (Republican) 37.4%
Georgia 6	James H. Blount	Democratic	1872	Incumbent re-elected.	▌ ✓ James H. Blount (Democratic); Unopposed
Georgia 7	William H. Felton	Independent Democratic	1874	Incumbent lost re-election. Democratic gain.	▌ ✓ Judson C. Clements (Democratic) 51.9%; ▌William H. Felton (Ind. Democratic) 48.1%
Georgia 8	Alexander H. Stephens	Democratic	1873 (special)	Incumbent re-elected.	▌ ✓ Alexander H. Stephens (Democratic); Unopposed
Georgia 9	Emory Speer	Independent Democratic	1878	Incumbent re-elected.	▌ ✓ Emory Speer (Ind. Democratic) 59.6%; ▌Hiram P. Bell (Democratic) 40.4%

== Illinois ==
District	Incumbent			This race	
District	Member	Party	First elected	Results	Candidates
Illinois 1	William Aldrich	Republican	1876	Incumbent re-elected.	▌ ✓ William Aldrich (Republican) 53.8%; ▌John Mattocks (Democratic) 43.5%; ▌J. J. Altpeter (Socialist) 1.5%; ▌Richard Powers (Greenback) 1.3%
Illinois 2	George R. Davis	Republican	1878	Incumbent re-elected.	▌ ✓ George R. Davis (Republican) 54.8%; ▌John F. Farnsworth (Democratic) 42.6%; ▌Richard Lovering (Socialist) 1.4%; ▌Charles G. Dixon (Greenback) 1.2%
Illinois 3	Hiram Barber Jr.	Republican	1878	Incumbent lost renomination. Republican hold.	▌ ✓ Charles B. Farwell (Republican) 57.3%; ▌Perry H. Smith (Democratic) 41.0%
Illinois 4	John C. Sherwin	Republican	1878	Incumbent re-elected.	▌ ✓ John C. Sherwin (Republican) 68.9%; ▌Norman C. Warner (Democratic) 27.2%; ▌E. W. Blaisdell (Greenback) 3.9%
Illinois 5	Robert M. A. Hawk	Republican	1878	Incumbent re-elected.	▌ ✓ Robert M. A. Hawk (Republican) 59.5%; ▌Larmont G. Johnson (Democratic) 26.0%; ▌John M. King (Greenback) 14.5%
Illinois 6	Thomas J. Henderson	Republican	1874	Incumbent re-elected.	▌ ✓ Thomas J. Henderson (Republican) 57.6%; ▌Bernard H. Truesdell (Democratic) 33.3%; ▌P. L. McKinney (Greenback) 9.1%
Illinois 7	Philip C. Hayes	Republican	1876	Incumbent retired. Republican hold.	▌ ✓ William Cullen (Republican) 53.8%; ▌Daniel Evans (Democratic) 39.1%; ▌Royal E. Barber (Greenback) 7.1%
Illinois 8	Greenbury L. Fort	Republican	1872	Incumbent retired. Republican hold.	▌ ✓ Lewis E. Payson (Republican) 54.4%; ▌Robert R. Wallace (Democratic) 45.6%
Illinois 9	Thomas A. Boyd	Republican	1876	Incumbent retired. Republican hold.	▌ ✓ John H. Lewis (Republican) 46.5%; ▌John S. Lee (Democratic) 45.4%; ▌William H. Reynolds (Greenback) 8.1%
Illinois 10	Benjamin F. Marsh	Republican	1876	Incumbent re-elected.	▌ ✓ Benjamin F. Marsh (Republican) 50.4%; ▌Robert Holloway (Democratic) 47.2%; ▌George C. Meadar (Greenback) 2.4%
Illinois 11	James W. Singleton	Democratic	1878	Incumbent re-elected.	▌ ✓ James W. Singleton (Democratic) 55.6%; ▌William H. Edgar (Republican) 38.9%; ▌A. B. Allen (Greenback) 5.5%
Illinois 12	William M. Springer	Democratic	1874	Incumbent re-elected.	▌ ✓ William M. Springer (Democratic) 51.6%; ▌Isaac L. Morrison (Republican) 43.8%; ▌Hyman M. Miller (Greenback) 4.6%
Illinois 13	Adlai Stevenson I	Democratic	1878	Incumbent lost re-election. Republican gain.	▌ ✓ Dietrich C. Smith (Republican) 50.5%; ▌Adlai Stevenson I (Democratic) 49.5%
Illinois 14	Joseph G. Cannon	Republican	1872	Incumbent re-elected.	▌ ✓ Joseph G. Cannon (Republican) 52.6%; ▌James B. Scott (Democratic) 47.4%
Illinois 15	Albert P. Forsythe	Greenback	1878	Incumbent lost re-election. Democratic gain.	▌ ✓ Samuel W. Moulton (Democratic) 53.5%; ▌Albert P. Forsythe (Greenback) 46.5%
Illinois 16	William A. J. Sparks	Democratic	1874	Incumbent re-elected.	▌ ✓ William A. J. Sparks (Democratic) 50.2%; ▌Plateruy E. Heasmer (Republican) 45.4%; ▌George W. Rutherford (Greenback) 4.3%
Illinois 17	William R. Morrison	Democratic	1872	Incumbent re-elected.	▌ ✓ William R. Morrison (Democratic) 51.5%; ▌John B. Hay (Republican) 48.5%
Illinois 18	John R. Thomas	Republican	1878	Incumbent re-elected.	▌ ✓ John R. Thomas (Republican) 51.1%; ▌William Hartzell (Democratic) 45.9%; ▌A. B. Roberson (Greenback) 3.0%
Illinois 19	Richard W. Townshend	Democratic	1876	Incumbent re-elected.	▌ ✓ Richard W. Townshend (Democratic) 52.9%; ▌Charles W. Pavey (Republican) 42.8%; ▌Samuel E. Flaomagam (Greenback) 4.3%

== Indiana ==
District	Incumbent			This race	
District	Member	Party	First elected	Results	Candidates
Indiana 1	William Heilman	Republican	1878	Incumbent re-elected.	▌ ✓ William Heilman (Republican) 48.4%; ▌John Jay Kleiner (Democratic) 47.6%; ▌Christian Kramer (Greenback) 4.0%
Indiana 2	Thomas R. Cobb	Democratic	1876	Incumbent re-elected.	▌ ✓ Thomas R. Cobb (Democratic) 54.3%; ▌James Braden (Republican) 43.2%; ▌John C. Albert (Greenback) 2.5%
Indiana 3	George A. Bicknell	Democratic	1876	Incumbent lost renomination. Democratic hold.	▌ ✓ Strother M. Stockslager (Democratic) 55.2%; ▌A. P. Charles (Republican) 42.6%; ▌Moses Poindexter (Greenback) 2.2%
Indiana 4	Jeptha D. New	Democratic	1878	Incumbent retired. Democratic hold.	▌ ✓ William S. Holman (Democratic) 52.0%; ▌John O. Cravens (Republican) 46.7%; ▌William H. Dunn (Greenback) 1.3%
Indiana 5	None (new district)			New seat. Democratic gain.	▌ ✓ Courtland C. Matson (Democratic) 49.5%; ▌W. B. Treat (Republican) 46.9%; ▌J. H. Robinson (Greenback) 3.6%
Indiana 6	Thomas M. Browne; Redistricted from the 5th district	Republican	1876	Incumbent re-elected.	▌ ✓ Thomas M. Browne (Republican) 62.2%; ▌M. B. Miller (Democratic) 35.6%; ▌M. W. Lee (Greenback) 2.2%
Indiana 7	Gilbert De La Matyr	Greenback	1878	Incumbent lost re-election. Republican gain.	▌ ✓ Stanton J. Peelle (Republican) 48.2%; ▌Casabianca Byfield (Democratic) 46.0%; ▌Gilbert De La Matyr (Greenback) 5.8%
Indiana 8	Abraham J. Hostetler	Democratic	1878	Incumbent retired. Republican gain.	▌ ✓ Robert B. F. Peirce (Republican) 49.0%; ▌Bayless W. Hanna (Democratic) 43.1%; ▌John W. Copner (Greenback) 7.9%
Indiana 9	Godlove S. Orth	Republican	1878	Incumbent re-elected.	▌ ✓ Godlove S. Orth (Republican) 49.6%; ▌William R. Myers (Democratic) 47.4%; ▌J. M. Armantrout (Greenback) 3.0%
Indiana 9	William R. Myers; Redistricted from the 6th district	Democratic	1878	Incumbent lost re-election. Democratic loss.	▌ ✓ Godlove S. Orth (Republican) 49.6%; ▌William R. Myers (Democratic) 47.4%; ▌J. M. Armantrout (Greenback) 3.0%
Indiana 10	None (new district)			New seat. Republican gain.	▌ ✓ Mark L. De Motte (Republican) 51.4%; ▌John N. Skinner (Democratic) 48.6%
Indiana 11	Calvin Cowgill	Republican	1878	Incumbent retired. Republican hold.	▌ ✓ George W. Steele (Republican) 49.2%; ▌James R. Slack (Democratic) 45.5%; ▌John Studebaker (Greenback) 5.3%
Indiana 12	Walpole G. Colerick	Democratic	1878	Incumbent re-elected.	▌ ✓ Walpole G. Colerick (Democratic) 51.1%; ▌Robert S. Taylor (Republican) 48.9%
Indiana 13	John Baker	Republican	1874	Incumbent retired. Republican loss.	▌ ✓ William H. Calkins (Republican) 49.1%; ▌Daniel McDonald (Democratic) 46.0%; ▌John Carter (Greenback) 4.9%
Indiana 13	William H. Calkins; Redistricted from the 10th district	Republican	1876	Incumbent re-elected.	▌ ✓ William H. Calkins (Republican) 49.1%; ▌Daniel McDonald (Democratic) 46.0%; ▌John Carter (Greenback) 4.9%

== Iowa ==
District	Incumbent			This race	
District	Member	Party	First elected	Results	Candidates
Iowa 1	Moses A. McCoid	Republican	1878	Incumbent re-elected.	▌ ✓ Moses A. McCoid (Republican) 53.9%; ▌W. B. Culbertson (Democratic) 38.2%; ▌Daniel P. Stubbs (Greenback) 7.9%
Iowa 2	Hiram Price	Republican	1876	Incumbent retired. Republican hold.	▌ ✓ Sewall S. Farwell (Republican) 54.9%; ▌Roderick Rose (Democratic) 41.2%; ▌Sindley Hoofries (Greenback) 3.9%
Iowa 3	Thomas Updegraff	Republican	1878	Incumbent re-elected.	▌ ✓ Thomas Updegraff (Republican) 51.8%; ▌William G. Stewart (Democratic) 41.7%; ▌M. H. Moore (Greenback) 6.5%
Iowa 4	Nathaniel C. Deering	Republican	1876	Incumbent re-elected.	▌ ✓ Nathaniel C. Deering (Republican) 65.4%; ▌Joseph S. Root (Democratic) 26.1%; ▌M. B. Doolittle (Greenback) 6.5%; ▌Ephraim J. Dean (Temperance) 2.0%
Iowa 5	William G. Thompson	Republican	1879 (special)	Incumbent re-elected.	▌ ✓ William G. Thompson (Republican) 59.9%; ▌R. E. Austin (Democratic) 33.8%; ▌A. F. Palmer (Greenback) 6.3%
Iowa 6	James B. Weaver	Greenback	1878	Incumbent retired to run for U.S. President. Republican gain.	▌ ✓ Marsena E. Cutts (Republican) 50.1%; ▌John C. Cook (Democratic) 49.9%
Iowa 6	James B. Weaver	Greenback	1878	Election successfully contested. New member seated March 3, 1883. Democratic gain.	▌ ✓ John C. Cook (Democratic); ▌Marsena E. Cutts (Republican)
Iowa 7	Edward H. Gillette	Greenback	1878	Incumbent lost re-election. Republican gain.	▌ ✓ John A. Kasson (Republican) 54.1%; ▌Edward H. Gillette (Greenback) 45.3%
Iowa 8	William F. Sapp	Republican	1876	Incumbent lost renomination. Republican hold.	▌ ✓ William P. Hepburn (Republican) 56.3%; ▌Robert Percival (Democratic) 30.0%; ▌H. C. Ayres (Greenback) 13.7%
Iowa 9	Cyrus C. Carpenter	Republican	1878	Incumbent re-elected.	▌ ✓ Cyrus C. Carpenter (Republican) 63.4%; ▌P. M. Guthrie (Democratic) 30.5%; ▌Daniel Campbell (Greenback) 6.1%

== Kansas ==
District	Incumbent			This race	
District	Member	Party	First elected	Results	Candidates
Kansas 1	John A. Anderson	Republican	1878	Incumbent re-elected.	▌ ✓ John A. Anderson (Republican) 61.8%; ▌C. C. Burnes (Democratic) 28.9%; ▌John Davis (Greenback) 9.3%
Kansas 2	Dudley C. Haskell	Republican	1876	Incumbent re-elected.	▌ ✓ Dudley C. Haskell (Republican) 56.4%; ▌Louis F. Green (Democratic) 43.6%
Kansas 3	Thomas Ryan	Republican	1876	Incumbent re-elected.	▌ ✓ Thomas Ryan (Republican) 60.9%; ▌J. Wade McDonald (Democratic) 25.2%; ▌David P. Mitchell (Greenback Labor) 13.9%

== Kentucky ==
District	Incumbent			This race	
District	Member	Party	First elected	Results	Candidates
Kentucky 1	Oscar Turner	Independent Democratic	1878	Incumbent re-elected as a Democrat. Democratic gain.	▌ ✓ Oscar Turner (Democratic) 53.6%; ▌Rodolphus B. Ratliff (Republican) 29.6%; ▌W. W. Tice (Democratic) 16.7%
Kentucky 2	James A. McKenzie	Democratic	1876	Incumbent re-elected.	▌ ✓ James A. McKenzie (Democratic) 52.0%; ▌John Feland (Republican) 29.5%; ▌Charles W. Cook (Greenback) 18.5%
Kentucky 3	John W. Caldwell	Democratic	1876	Incumbent re-elected.	▌ ✓ John W. Caldwell (Democratic) 50.7%; ▌Manilus T. Flippin (Republican) 42.6%; ▌George Wright (Greenback) 6.7%
Kentucky 4	J. Proctor Knott	Democratic	1874	Incumbent re-elected.	▌ ✓ J. Proctor Knott (Democratic) 59.2%; ▌William T. Thurmond (Republican) 28.4%; ▌L. E. Green (Greenback) 12.1%
Kentucky 5	Albert S. Willis	Democratic	1876	Incumbent re-elected.	▌ ✓ Albert S. Willis (Democratic) 48.5%; ▌Thomas E. Burns (Republican) 34.3%; ▌Thomas Hays (Democratic) 15.4%; ▌Thomas J. Key (Greenback) 1.8%
Kentucky 6	John G. Carlisle	Democratic	1876	Incumbent re-elected.	▌ ✓ John G. Carlisle (Democratic) 63.7%; ▌Oliver H. Root (Republican) 36.3%
Kentucky 7	J. C. S. Blackburn	Democratic	1874	Incumbent re-elected.	▌ ✓ J. C. S. Blackburn (Democratic) 70.6%; ▌Lycander Hord (Republican) 23.9%; ▌William C. Goodloe (Republican) 5.1%
Kentucky 8	Philip B. Thompson Jr.	Democratic	1878	Incumbent re-elected.	▌ ✓ Philip B. Thompson Jr. (Democratic) 53.0%; ▌Speed S. Fry (Republican) 44.6%; ▌T. J. Cooper (Greenback) 2.4%
Kentucky 9	Thomas Turner	Democratic	1876	Incumbent lost re-election. Republican gain.	▌ ✓ John D. White (Republican) 53.5%; ▌Thomas Turner (Democratic) 46.5%
Kentucky 10	Elijah Phister	Democratic	1878	Incumbent re-elected.	▌ ✓ Elijah Phister (Democratic) 51.8%; ▌George M. Thomas (Republican) 48.2%

== Louisiana ==
District	Incumbent			This race	
District	Member	Party	First elected	Results	Candidates
Louisiana 1	Randall L. Gibson	Democratic	1874	Incumbent re-elected.	▌ ✓ Randall L. Gibson (Democratic) 66.5%; ▌A. J. Ker (Republican) 33.5%
Louisiana 2	E. John Ellis	Democratic	1874	Incumbent re-elected.	▌ ✓ E. John Ellis (Democratic) 60.0%; ▌Michael Hahn (Republican) 40.0%
Louisiana 3	Joseph H. Acklen	Democratic	1876	Incumbent retired. Republican gain.	▌ ✓ Chester B. Darrall (Republican) 63.2%; ▌J. S. Billiu (Democratic) 36.8%
Louisiana 4	Joseph B. Elam	Democratic	1876	Incumbent retired. Democratic hold.	▌ ✓ Newton C. Blanchard (Democratic) 88.4%; ▌A. C. Wells (Republican) 11.6%
Louisiana 5	J. Floyd King	Democratic	1878	Incumbent re-elected.	▌ ✓ J. Floyd King (Democratic) 82.2%; ▌R. H. Lanier (Republican) 17.8%
Louisiana 6	Edward W. Robertson	Democratic	1876	Incumbent re-elected.	▌ ✓ Edward W. Robertson (Democratic) 64.9%; ▌Alexander Smith (Republican) 35.1%

== Maine ==
Maine held elections for its five members on September 13, 1880.

District	Incumbent			This race	
District	Member	Party	First elected	Results	Candidates
Maine 1	Thomas B. Reed	Republican	1876	Incumbent re-elected.	▌ ✓ Thomas B. Reed (Republican) 49.8%; ▌Samuel J. Anderson (Democratic) 49.4%
Maine 2	William P. Frye	Republican	1870	Incumbent re-elected.	▌ ✓ William P. Frye (Republican) 53.7%; ▌Frank M. Fogg (Greenback) 45.9%
Maine 3	Stephen Lindsey	Republican	1876	Incumbent re-elected.	▌ ✓ Stephen Lindsey (Republican) 50.8%; ▌William Philbrick (Greenback) 49.2%
Maine 4	George W. Ladd	Greenback	1878	Incumbent re-elected.	▌ ✓ George W. Ladd (Greenback) 51.6%; ▌Charles A. Boutelle (Republican) 48.4%
Maine 5	Thompson H. Murch	Greenback	1878	Incumbent re-elected.	▌ ✓ Thompson H. Murch (Greenback) 51.7%; ▌Seth L. Milliken (Republican) 48.3%

== Maryland ==
District	Incumbent			This race	
District	Member	Party	First elected	Results	Candidates
Maryland 1	Daniel M. Henry	Democratic	1876	Incumbent retired. Democratic hold.	▌ ✓ George W. Covington (Democratic) 54.0%; ▌Washington A. Smith (Republican) 45.6%
Maryland 2	J. Frederick C. Talbott	Democratic	1878	Incumbent re-elected.	▌ ✓ J. Frederick C. Talbott (Democratic) 52.6%; ▌Edward H. Webster (Republican) 47.2%
Maryland 3	William Kimmel	Democratic	1876	Incumbent retired. Democratic hold.	▌ ✓ Fetter S. Hoblitzell (Democratic) 57.6%; ▌Joshua Horner (Republican) 42.1%
Maryland 4	Robert M. McLane	Democratic	1878	Incumbent re-elected.	▌ ✓ Robert M. McLane (Democratic) 53.6%; ▌George C. Maund (Republican) 46.2%
Maryland 5	Eli J. Henkle	Democratic	1874	Incumbent retired. Democratic hold.	▌ ✓ Andrew G. Chapman (Democratic) 53.2%; ▌William R. Wilmer (Republican) 46.6%
Maryland 6	Milton Urner	Republican	1878	Incumbent re-elected.	▌ ✓ Milton Urner (Republican) 50.5%; ▌James M. Schley (Democratic) 48.2%; ▌Nathaniel Lerner (Greenback) 1.3%

== Massachusetts ==
District	Incumbent			This race	
District	Member	Party	First elected	Results	Candidates
Massachusetts 1	William W. Crapo	Republican	1874	Incumbent re-elected.	▌ ✓ William W. Crapo (Republican) 69.88%; ▌Charles G. Davis (Democratic) 28.44%; Others: ▌Whitman Chace (Democratic) 0.64%; ▌Rodney French (Prohibition) 0.54%; ▌Henry B. Maglathhia (Unknown) 0.50%
Massachusetts 2	Benjamin W. Harris	Republican	1872	Incumbent re-elected.	▌ ✓ Benjamin W. Harris (Republican) 62.81%; ▌Edgar E. Dean (Democratic) 35.81%; Others: ▌Charles G. Davis (Democratic) 0.52%; ▌Joseph Sherman (Prohibition) 0.43%; ▌Whitman Chace (Greenback) 0.43%
Massachusetts 3	Walbridge A. Field	Republican	1878	Incumbent retired. Republican hold.	▌ ✓ Ambrose Ranney (Republican) 51.92%; ▌Axel Dearborn (Democratic) 47.73%; Others: ▌Orrin Fairbanks (Greenback) 0.30%; ▌Henry D. Cushing (Prohibition) 0.06%
Massachusetts 4	Leopold Morse	Democratic	1876	Incumbent re-elected.	▌ ✓ Leopold Morse (Democratic) 49.39%; ▌Francis B. Hayes (Republican) 48.86%; ▌William Gaston (Greenback) 1.03%; Others: ▌Gustavius B. Hutchinson (Prohibition) 0.39%; Scattering 0.33%
Massachusetts 5	Selwyn Z. Bowman	Republican	1878	Incumbent re-elected.	▌ ✓ Selwyn Z. Bowman (Republican) 55.98%; ▌Lucius Beebe (Democratic) 39.34%; ▌James N. Buffum (Greenback) 4.68%
Massachusetts 6	George B. Loring	Republican	1876	Incumbent lost renomination. Republican hold.	▌ ✓ Eben F. Stone (Republican) 54.27%; ▌Eben Moody Boynton (Democratic) 45.73%
Massachusetts 7	William A. Russell	Republican	1878	Incumbent re-elected.	▌ ✓ William A. Russell (Republican) 58.84%; ▌Samuel N. Aldrich (Democratic) 39.38%; ▌Levi H. Whitney (Greenback) 1.79%
Massachusetts 8	William Claflin	Republican	1876	Incumbent retired. Republican hold.	▌ ✓ John W. Candler (Republican) 58.21%; ▌Charles T. Russell (Democratic) 40.37%; ▌James L. Babcock (Greenback) 1.07%; ▌George W. Stacey (Prohibition) 0.35%
Massachusetts 9	William W. Rice	Republican	1876	Incumbent re-elected.	▌ ✓ William W. Rice (Republican) 61.69%; ▌Matthew J. McCafferty (Democratic) 36.86%; ▌Aaron B. Brown (Greenback) 1.45%
Massachusetts 10	Amasa Norcross	Republican	1876	Incumbent re-elected.	▌ ✓ Amasa Norcross (Republican) 62.96%; ▌Henry Elijah Alvord (Democratic) 34.80%; ▌Levi Stockbridge (Greenback) 2.24%
Massachusetts 11	George D. Robinson	Republican	1876	Incumbent re-elected.	▌ ✓ George D. Robinson (Republican) 58.33%; ▌Albert C. Woodworth (Democratic) 41.00%; Others: ▌E. W. Dickenson (Greenback) 0.41%; ▌Charles A. Merrill (Prohibition) 0.26%

== Michigan ==
District	Incumbent			This race	
District	Member	Party	First elected	Results	Candidates
Michigan 1	John S. Newberry	Republican	1878	Incumbent retired. Republican hold.	▌ ✓ Henry W. Lord (Republican) 49.9%; ▌William C. Maybury (Democratic) 48.1%; ▌Lyman E. Stowe (Greenback) 2.0%
Michigan 2	Edwin Willits	Republican	1876	Incumbent re-elected.	▌ ✓ Edwin Willits (Republican) 50.6%; ▌William H. Waldby (Democratic) 44.4%; ▌G. B. Chester (Greenback) 4.5%
Michigan 3	Jonas H. McGowan	Republican	1876	Incumbent retired. Republican hold.	▌ ✓ Edward S. Lacey (Republican) 52.9%; ▌Eugene Pringle (Democratic) 24.2%; ▌Henry C. Hodge (Greenback) 22.3%
Michigan 4	Julius C. Burrows	Republican	1878	Incumbent re-elected.	▌ ✓ Julius C. Burrows (Republican) 53.5%; ▌O. W. Powers (Democratic) 34.8%; ▌H. Chamberlain Yaple (Greenback) 11.7%
Michigan 5	John W. Stone	Republican	1876	Incumbent retired. Republican hold.	▌ ✓ George W. Webber (Republican) 52.2%; ▌Leonard H. Randall (Democratic) 26.1%; ▌John C. Blanchard (Greenback) 21.7%
Michigan 6	Mark S. Brewer	Republican	1876	Incumbent retired. Republican hold.	▌ ✓ Oliver L. Spaulding (Republican) 49.5%; ▌Edwin B. Winans (Democratic) 38.3%; ▌Josiah Begole (Greenback) 12.0%
Michigan 7	Omar D. Conger	Republican	1868	Incumbent re-elected.	▌ ✓ Omar D. Conger (Republican) 53.4%; ▌Cyrenius P. Black (Democratic) 42.2%; ▌John J. Watkins (Greenback) 4.4%
Michigan 8	Roswell G. Horr	Republican	1878	Incumbent re-elected.	▌ ✓ Roswell G. Horr (Republican) 48.3%; ▌Timothy E. Tarsney (Democratic) 43.0%; ▌William Smith (Greenback) 8.7%
Michigan 9	Jay Hubbell	Republican	1872	Incumbent re-elected.	▌ ✓ Jay Hubbell (Republican) 60.3%; ▌Edwin S. Pratt (Democratic) 37.7%; ▌George Parmelee (Greenback) 2.1%

== Minnesota ==
District	Incumbent			This race	
District	Member	Party	First elected	Results	Candidates
Minnesota 1	Mark H. Dunnell	Republican	1870	Incumbent re-elected.	▌ ✓ Mark H. Dunnell (Republican) 49.1%; ▌Henry R. Wells (Democratic) 30.2%; ▌William G. Ward (Republican) 16.8%; ▌D. H. Roberts (Prohibition) 2.1%; ▌C. H. Roberts (Greenback) 1.6%
Minnesota 2	Henry Poehler	Democratic	1878	Incumbent lost re-election. Republican gain.	▌ ✓ Horace B. Strait (Republican) 56.3%; ▌Henry Poehler (Democratic) 42.9%
Minnesota 3	William D. Washburn	Republican	1878	Incumbent re-elected.	▌ ✓ William D. Washburn (Republican) 59.7%; ▌Henry Hastings Sibley (Democratic) 39.0%; ▌Ebenezer Ayers (Greenback) 1.2%

== Mississippi ==
District	Incumbent			This race	
District	Member	Party	First elected	Results	Candidates
Mississippi 1	Henry L. Muldrow	Democratic	1876	Incumbent re-elected.	▌ ✓ Henry L. Muldrow (Democratic) 74.74%; ▌Joseph L. Morphis (Republican) 19.79%; ▌T. W. Davidson (Greenback) 5.47%
Mississippi 2	Van. H. Manning	Democratic	1876	Incumbent re-elected.	▌ ✓ Van. H. Manning (Democratic) 52.90%; ▌George M. Buchanan (Republican) 34.67%; ▌Thomas W. Harris (Greenback) 12.43%
Mississippi 3	Hernando Money	Democratic	1874	Incumbent re-elected.	▌ ✓ Hernando Money (Democratic) 80.78%; ▌John G. Gunn (Greenback) 19.23%
Mississippi 4	Otho R. Singleton	Democratic	1874	Incumbent re-elected.	▌ ✓ Otho R. Singleton (Democratic) 76.70%; ▌W. A. Drennan (Republican) 23.30%
Mississippi 5	Charles E. Hooker	Democratic	1874	Incumbent re-elected.	▌ ✓ Charles E. Hooker (Democratic) 61.59%; ▌J. Bots Deason (Ind. Republican) 32.41%; ▌Isaac N. Osborn (Republican) 4.84%; ▌William Patterson (Greenback) 1.16%
Mississippi 6	James Ronald Chalmers	Democratic	1876	Incumbent re-elected.	▌ ✓ James Ronald Chalmers (Democratic) 62.97%; ▌John R. Lynch (Republican) 37.03%
Mississippi 6	James Ronald Chalmers	Democratic	1876	Election successfully contested. New member seated April 29, 1882. Republican gain.	▌ ✓ John R. Lynch (Republican) 52.47%; ▌James Ronald Chalmers (Democratic) 47.53%

== Missouri ==
District	Incumbent			This race	
District	Member	Party	First elected	Results	Candidates
Missouri 1	Martin L. Clardy	Democratic	1878	Incumbent re-elected.	▌ ✓ Martin L. Clardy (Democratic) 51.6%; ▌Thomas Clement Fletcher (Republican) 48.2%
Missouri 2	Erastus Wells	Democratic	1878	Incumbent retired. Democratic hold.	▌ ✓ Thomas Allen (Democratic) 55.4%; ▌Myer Rosenblatt (Republican) 44.6%
Missouri 3	R. Graham Frost	Democratic	1878	Incumbent re-elected.	▌ ✓ R. Graham Frost (Democratic) 50.5%; ▌Gustavus Sessinghaus (Republican) 49.5%
Missouri 3	R. Graham Frost	Democratic	1878	Election successfully contested. New member seated March 2, 1883. Republican gain.	▌ ✓ Gustavus Sessinghaus (Republican) 50.4%; ▌R. Graham Frost (Democratic) 49.6%
Missouri 4	Lowndes H. Davis	Democratic	1878	Incumbent re-elected.	▌ ✓ Lowndes H. Davis (Democratic) 94.1%; ▌T. C. Simpson (Greenback) 5.9%
Missouri 5	Richard P. Bland	Democratic	1872	Incumbent re-elected.	▌ ✓ Richard P. Bland (Democratic) 54.6%; ▌R. B. Palmer (Greenback) 45.4%
Missouri 6	James R. Waddill	Democratic	1878	Incumbent lost re-election. Greenback gain.	▌ ✓ Ira S. Haseltine (Greenback) 50.1%; ▌James R. Waddill (Democratic) 49.9%
Missouri 7	John F. Philips	Democratic	1880 (special)	Incumbent lost re-election. Greenback gain.	▌ ✓ Theron M. Rice (Greenback) 50.8%; ▌John F. Philips (Democratic) 49.2%
Missouri 8	Samuel L. Sawyer	Democratic	1878	Incumbent retired. Republican gain.	▌ ✓ Robert T. Van Horn (Republican) 33.2%; ▌D. C. Allen (Democratic) 31.6%; ▌John T. Crisp (Ind. Democratic) 30.8%; ▌Frank H. Clark (Greenback) 4.8%
Missouri 9	Nicholas Ford	Greenback	1878	Incumbent re-elected.	▌ ✓ Nicholas Ford (Greenback) 50.002%; ▌James Craig (Democratic) 49.997%
Missouri 10	Gideon F. Rothwell	Democratic	1878	Incumbent lost renomination. Greenback gain.	▌ ✓ Joseph H. Burrows (Greenback) 50.1%; ▌Charles H. Mansur (Democratic) 49.9%
Missouri 11	John B. Clark Jr.	Democratic	1872	Incumbent re-elected.	▌ ✓ John B. Clark Jr. (Democratic) 69.8%; ▌I. C. Heberling (Greenback) 30.2%
Missouri 12	William H. Hatch	Democratic	1878	Incumbent re-elected.	▌ ✓ William H. Hatch (Democratic) 53.3%; ▌John M. London (Greenback) 46.7%
Missouri 13	Aylett H. Buckner	Democratic	1872	Incumbent re-elected.	▌ ✓ Aylett H. Buckner (Democratic) 70.0%; ▌E. G. Haley (Greenback) 30.0%

== Nebraska ==
District	Incumbent			This race	
District	Member	Party	First elected	Results	Candidates
Nebraska at-large	Edward K. Valentine	Republican	1878	Incumbent re-elected.	▌ ✓ Edward K. Valentine (Republican) 62.37%; ▌James E. North (Democratic) 28.00%; ▌Allen Root (Greenback) 4.81%; Scattering 4.83%

== Nevada ==
District	Incumbent			This race	
District	Member	Party	First elected	Results	Candidates
Nevada at-large	Rollin M. Daggett	Republican	1878	Incumbent lost re-election. Democratic gain.	▌ ✓ George W. Cassidy (Democratic) 53.4%; ▌Rollin M. Daggett (Republican) 46.6%

== New Hampshire ==
District	Incumbent			This race	
District	Member	Party	First elected	Results	Candidates
New Hampshire 1	Joshua G. Hall	Republican	1878	Incumbent re-elected.	▌ ✓ Joshua G. Hall (Republican) 51.5%; ▌John W. Sanborn (Democratic) 47.6%
New Hampshire 2	James F. Briggs	Republican	1877	Incumbent re-elected.	▌ ✓ James F. Briggs (Republican) 52.4%; ▌Alvah W. Sulloway (Democratic) 47.1%
New Hampshire 3	Evarts W. Farr	Republican	1878	Incumbent re-elected.	▌ ✓ Evarts W. Farr (Republican) 51.3%; ▌George A. Bingham (Democratic) 47.7%

== New Jersey ==
District	Incumbent			This race	
District	Member	Party	First elected	Results	Candidates
New Jersey 1	George M. Robeson	Republican	1878	Incumbent re-elected.	▌ ✓ George M. Robeson (Republican) 53.6%; ▌Joseph D. Carter (Democratic) 44.2%; ▌Charles J. Hollis (Greenback) 2.0%
New Jersey 2	Hezekiah B. Smith	Democratic	1878	Incumbent lost re-election. Republican gain.	▌ ✓ J. Hart Brewer (Republican) 52.4%; ▌Hezekiah B. Smith (Democratic) 46.6%; ▌Samuel A. Dobbins (Greenback) 1.0%
New Jersey 3	Miles Ross	Democratic	1874	Incumbent re-elected.	▌ ✓ Miles Ross (Democratic) 53.3%; ▌Chilion Robbins (Republican) 45.8%
New Jersey 4	Alvah A. Clark	Democratic	1876	Incumbent retired. Democratic hold.	▌ ✓ Henry S. Harris (Democratic) 56.1%; ▌Judson Kilpatrick (Republican) 42.4%; ▌George H. Larison (Greenback) 1.5%
New Jersey 5	Charles H. Voorhis	Republican	1878	Incumbent retired. Republican hold.	▌ ✓ John Hill (Republican) 52.0%; ▌Augustus W. Cutler (Democratic) 47.0%; ▌Erastus Potter (Greenback) 1.0%
New Jersey 6	John L. Blake	Republican	1878	Incumbent retired. Republican hold.	▌ ✓ Phineas Jones (Republican) 53.3%; ▌Edward Balbach (Democratic) 46.7%
New Jersey 7	Lewis A. Brigham	Republican	1878	Incumbent lost re-election. Democratic gain.	▌ ✓ Augustus A. Hardenbergh (Democratic) 56.7%; ▌Lewis A. Brigham (Republican) 42.8%

== New York ==
District	Incumbent			This race	
District	Member	Party	First elected	Results	Candidates
New York 1	James W. Covert	Democratic	1876	Incumbent retired. Democratic hold.	▌ ✓ Perry Belmont (Democratic) 53.1%; ▌John A. King (Republican) 46.4%
New York 2	Daniel O'Reilly	Independent Democratic	1878	Incumbent lost re-election. Democratic gain.	▌ ✓ William E. Robinson (Democratic) 61.3%; ▌Daniel O'Reilly (Ind. Democratic) 37.0%; ▌James A. Van Brunt (Independent) 1.2%
New York 3	Simeon B. Chittenden	Republican	1874 (special)	Incumbent lost re-election. Independent gain.	▌ ✓ J. Hyatt Smith (Independent) 51.5%; ▌Simeon B. Chittenden (Republican) 48.1%
New York 4	Archibald M. Bliss	Democratic	1874	Incumbent re-elected.	▌ ✓ Archibald M. Bliss (Democratic) 57.2%; ▌Daniel W. Talmage (Republican) 41.7%; ▌C. Osborne Ward (Greenback) 1.1%
New York 5	Nicholas Muller	Democratic	1876	Incumbent lost renomination. Democratic hold.	▌ ✓ Benjamin Wood (Democratic) 47.7%; ▌Nicholas Muller (Ind. Democratic) 40.8%; ▌Charles G. Brockmeiser (Greenback) 11.3%
New York 6	Samuel S. Cox	Democratic	1873 (special)	Incumbent re-elected.	▌ ✓ Samuel S. Cox (Democratic) 70.4%; ▌Victor Heimberger (Republican) 29.6%
New York 7	Edwin Einstein	Republican	1878	Incumbent retired. Democratic gain.	▌ ✓ P. Henry Dugro (Democratic) 49.5%; ▌William W. Astor (Republican) 48.8%; ▌Alexander Henninger (Independent) 1.7%
New York 8	Anson G. McCook	Republican	1876	Incumbent re-elected.	▌ ✓ Anson G. McCook (Republican) 58.2%; ▌John G. Davis (Democratic) 41.7%
New York 9	Fernando Wood	Democratic	1866	Incumbent re-elected.	▌ ✓ Fernando Wood (Democratic) 38.1%; ▌John L. Hunt (Republican) 32.8%; ▌John Hardy (Ind. Democratic) 29.0%
New York 10	James O'Brien	Independent Democratic	1878	Incumbent lost renomination. Democratic gain.	▌ ✓ Abram Hewitt (Democratic) 64.7%; ▌James Polcott (Republican) 34.7%
New York 11	Levi P. Morton	Republican	1878	Incumbent re-elected.	▌ ✓ Levi P. Morton (Republican) 55.0%; ▌James W. Gerard (Democratic) 45.0%
New York 12	Waldo Hutchins	Democratic	1879 (special)	Incumbent re-elected.	▌ ✓ Waldo Hutchins (Democratic) 51.6%; ▌Alexander Taylor (Republican) 48.2%
New York 13	John H. Ketcham	Republican	1876	Incumbent re-elected.	▌ ✓ John H. Ketcham (Republican) 56.9%; ▌Edward L. Gaul (Democratic) 42.8%
New York 14	John W. Ferdon	Republican	1878	Incumbent retired. Democratic gain.	▌ ✓ Lewis Beach (Democratic) 49.8%; ▌Charles T. Pierson (Republican) 48.3%; ▌Addison J. Clements (Greenback) 1.8%
New York 15	William Lounsbery	Democratic	1878	Incumbent retired. Republican gain.	▌ ✓ Thomas Cornell (Republican) 50.7%; ▌John S. Pindar (Democratic) 48.4%
New York 16	John M. Bailey	Republican	1878 (special)	Incumbent retired. Democratic gain.	▌ ✓ Michael N. Nolan (Democratic) 52.7%; ▌Samuel O. Vanderpoel (Republican) 46.7%
New York 17	Walter A. Wood	Republican	1878	Incumbent re-elected.	▌ ✓ Walter A. Wood (Republican) 80.9%; ▌Richard H. Ferguson (Democratic) 19.1%
New York 18	John Hammond	Republican	1878	Incumbent re-elected.	▌ ✓ John Hammond (Republican) 58.6%; ▌Thaddeus H. Walker (Democratic) 38.4%; ▌Daniel F. Keeffe (Greenback) 2.9%
New York 19	Amaziah B. James	Republican	1876	Incumbent retired. Republican hold.	▌ ✓ Abraham X. Parker (Republican) 66.7%; ▌Albert Andrus (Democratic) 31.8%
New York 20	John H. Starin	Republican	1876	Incumbent retired. Republican hold.	▌ ✓ George West (Republican) 56.3%; ▌Nicholas H. Decker (Democratic) 42.8%
New York 21	David Wilber	Republican	1878	Incumbent retired. Republican hold.	▌ ✓ Ferris Jacobs Jr. (Republican) 51.9%; ▌Franklin R. Gilbert (Democratic) 44.8%; ▌Games L. Halsey (Greenback) 2.9%
New York 22	Warner Miller	Republican	1878	Incumbent re-elected.	▌ ✓ Warner Miller (Republican) 55.3%; ▌Dennis O'Brien (Democratic) 44.4%
New York 23	Cyrus D. Prescott	Republican	1878	Incumbent re-elected.	▌ ✓ Cyrus D. Prescott (Republican) 52.8%; ▌Richard E. Sutton (Democratic) 45.6%; ▌John Ryan (Greenback) 1.1%
New York 24	Joseph Mason	Republican	1878	Incumbent re-elected.	▌ ✓ Joseph Mason (Republican) 58.7%; ▌Benjamin F. Lewis (Democratic) 38.2%; ▌Charles P. Nash (Greenback) 2.6%
New York 25	Frank Hiscock	Republican	1876	Incumbent re-elected.	▌ ✓ Frank Hiscock (Republican) 57.5%; ▌William C. Reiger (Democratic) 42.4%
New York 26	John H. Camp	Republican	1876	Incumbent re-elected.	▌ ✓ John H. Camp (Republican) 56.4%; ▌Frederick H. Van Auken (Democratic) 40.5%; ▌Martin L. Walley (Greenback) 3.1%
New York 27	Elbridge G. Lapham	Republican	1874	Incumbent re-elected.	▌ ✓ Elbridge G. Lapham (Republican) 55.3%; ▌Clement W. Bennett (Democratic) 43.2%; ▌Albert Heath (Greenback) 1.5%
New York 28	Jeremiah W. Dwight	Republican	1876	Incumbent re-elected.	▌ ✓ Jeremiah W. Dwight (Republican) 54.8%; ▌Frederick Davis (Democratic) 42.4%; ▌John D. Wagner (Greenback) 2.8%
New York 29	David P. Richardson	Republican	1878	Incumbent re-elected.	▌ ✓ David P. Richardson (Republican) 52.4%; ▌Thomas K. Beecher (Democratic) 47.6%
New York 30	John Van Voorhis	Republican	1878	Incumbent re-elected.	▌ ✓ John Van Voorhis (Republican) 55.4%; ▌Albert S. Warner (Democratic) 43.1%; ▌Leonard Henkle (Greenback) 1.4%
New York 31	Richard Crowley	Republican	1878	Incumbent re-elected.	▌ ✓ Richard Crowley (Republican) 54.8%; ▌Robert S. Stevens (Democratic) 44.7%
New York 32	Vacant			Rep. Ray V. Pierce (R) resigned September 18, 1880. Democratic gain.	▌ ✓ Jonathan Scoville (Democratic) 50.0%; ▌Myron R. Bush (Republican) 49.2%
New York 33	Henry Van Aernam	Republican	1878	Incumbent re-elected.	▌ ✓ Henry Van Aernam (Republican) 58.6%; ▌George Van Campen (Democratic) 35.6%; ▌John A. Gould (Greenback) 4.7%; ▌Walter A. Sellers (Prohibition) 1.2%

== North Carolina ==
District	Incumbent			This race	
District	Member	Party	First elected	Results	Candidates
North Carolina 1	Jesse J. Yeates	Democratic	1874	Incumbent retired. Democratic hold.	▌ ✓ Louis C. Latham (Democratic) 50.9%; ▌Cyrus W. Grandy (Republican) 49.1%
North Carolina 2	William H. Kitchin	Democratic	1878	Incumbent lost re-election. Republican gain.	▌ ✓ Orlando Hubbs (Republican) 57.2%; ▌William H. Kitchin (Democratic) 42.5%
North Carolina 3	Daniel L. Russell	Greenback	1878	Incumbent retired. Democratic gain.	▌ ✓ John W. Shackelford (Democratic) 51.1%; ▌William P. Canaday (Republican) 46.9%; ▌H. R. Komegay (Greenback) 2.0%
North Carolina 4	Joseph J. Davis	Democratic	1874	Incumbent retired. Democratic hold.	▌ ✓ William R. Cox (Democratic) 51.9%; ▌Moses A. Bledsoe (Republican) 48.1%
North Carolina 5	Alfred M. Scales	Democratic	1874	Incumbent re-elected.	▌ ✓ Alfred M. Scales (Democratic) 52.7%; ▌Thomas B. Keogh (Republican) 45.1%; ▌John R. Winston (Greenback) 2.2%
North Carolina 6	Walter L. Steele	Democratic	1876	Incumbent retired. Democratic hold.	▌ ✓ Clement Dowd (Democratic) 57.0%; ▌William R. Myers (Republican) 43.0%
North Carolina 7	Robert F. Armfield	Democratic	1878	Incumbent re-elected.	▌ ✓ Robert F. Armfield (Democratic) 53.9%; ▌David M. Furches (Republican) 46.1%
North Carolina 8	Robert B. Vance	Democratic	1872	Incumbent re-elected.	▌ ✓ Robert B. Vance (Democratic) 64.9%; ▌Nathaniel Atkinson (Ind. Republican) 28.8%; ▌Samuel L. Love (Greenback) 6.1%

== Ohio ==
Ohio held elections for its twenty members on October 12, 1880.

District	Incumbent			This race	
District	Member	Party	First elected	Results	Candidates
Ohio 1	Benjamin Butterworth	Republican	1878	Incumbent re-elected.	▌ ✓ Benjamin Butterworth (Republican) 52.0%; ▌Samuel F. Hunt (Democratic) 47.9%
Ohio 2	Thomas L. Young	Republican	1878	Incumbent re-elected.	▌ ✓ Thomas L. Young (Republican) 51.5%; ▌Henry B. Banning (Democratic) 48.5%
Ohio 3	William D. Hill; Redistricted from the 6th district	Democratic	1878	Incumbent retired. Republican gain.	▌ ✓ Henry L. Morey (Republican) 49.7%; ▌Durbin Ward (Democratic) 49.6%
Ohio 4	John A. McMahon; Redistricted from the 3rd district	Democratic	1874	Incumbent lost re-election. Republican gain.	▌ ✓ Emanuel Shultz (Republican) 50.0%; ▌John A. McMahon (Democratic) 49.3%
Ohio 5	Benjamin Le Fevre	Democratic	1878	Incumbent re-elected.	▌ ✓ Benjamin Le Fevre (Democratic) 60.1%; ▌William K. Boone (Republican) 39.5%
Ohio 6	Frank H. Hurd; Redistricted from the 7th district	Democratic	1878	Incumbent lost re-election. Republican gain.	▌ ✓ James M. Ritchie (Republican) 49.4%; ▌Frank H. Hurd (Democratic) 47.7%
Ohio 7	Ebenezer B. Finley; Redistricted from the 8th district	Democratic	1878	Incumbent retired. Democratic hold.	▌ ✓ John P. Leedom (Democratic) 52.6%; ▌Alphonso Hart (Republican) 47.4%
Ohio 8	J. Warren Keifer; Redistricted from the 4th district	Republican	1876	Incumbent re-elected.	▌ ✓ J. Warren Keifer (Republican) 57.3%; ▌Frank Chance (Democratic) 41.3%
Ohio 9	Henry L. Dickey; Redistricted from the 11th district	Democratic	1878	Incumbent retired. Republican gain.	▌ ✓ James S. Robinson (Republican) 51.0%; ▌Caleb H. Norris (Democratic) 47.8%; ▌J. A. Mouser (Greenback) 1.2%
Ohio 10	Thomas Ewing Jr.	Democratic	1876	Incumbent retired. Republican gain.	▌ ✓ John B. Rice (Republican) 50.9%; ▌Morgan Shaffer (Democratic) 47.1%; ▌John J. Seitz (Greenback) 1.7%
Ohio 11	Henry S. Neal; Redistricted from the 12th district	Republican	1876	Incumbent re-elected.	▌ ✓ Henry S. Neal (Republican) 52.9%; ▌William A. Hutchins (Democratic) 46.3%
Ohio 12	George L. Converse; Redistricted from the 9th district	Democratic	1878	Incumbent re-elected.	▌ ✓ George L. Converse (Democratic) 54.4%; ▌John Groce (Republican) 43.9%; ▌Isaac B. Williams (Greenback) 1.3%
Ohio 13	Gibson Atherton; Redistricted from the 14th district	Democratic	1878	Incumbent re-elected.	▌ ✓ Gibson Atherton (Democratic) 53.0%; ▌Appleton B. Clarke (Republican) 46.1%
Ohio 14	George W. Geddes; Redistricted from the 15th district	Democratic	1878	Incumbent re-elected.	▌ ✓ George W. Geddes (Democratic) 59.3%; ▌S. Ellis Fink (Republican) 40.5%
Ohio 15	Adoniram J. Warner; Redistricted from the 13th district	Democratic	1878	Incumbent lost re-election. Republican gain.	▌ ✓ Rufus Dawes (Republican) 50.1%; ▌Adoniram J. Warner (Democratic) 48.5%
Ohio 16	Jonathan T. Updegraff; Redistricted from the 18th district	Republican	1878	Incumbent re-elected.	▌ ✓ Jonathan T. Updegraff (Republican) 54.2%; ▌James F. Charlesworth (Democratic) 45.7%
Ohio 17	William McKinley; Redistricted from the 16th district	Republican	1876	Incumbent re-elected.	▌ ✓ William McKinley (Republican) 53.5%; ▌Leroy D. Thoman (Democratic) 44.1%; ▌Charles Jenkins (Greenback) 2.1%
Ohio 18	James Monroe; Redistricted from the 17th district	Republican	1870	Incumbent retired. Republican hold.	▌ ✓ Addison S. McClure (Republican) 57.0%; ▌David L. Wadsworth (Democratic) 41.4%; ▌Peter J. Rice (Greenback) 1.0%
Ohio 19	James A. Garfield	Republican	1862	Incumbent retired to run for U.S. President. Republican hold. Winner then won a special election to finish the term when the incumbent resigned, see above.	▌ ✓ Ezra B. Taylor (Republican) 67.4%; ▌Charles D. Adams (Democratic) 29.9%; ▌W. H. Miller (Greenback) 2.1%
Ohio 20	Amos Townsend	Republican	1876	Incumbent re-elected.	▌ ✓ Amos Townsend (Republican) 56.0%; ▌John Hutchins (Democratic) 41.6%; ▌A. M. Jackson (Greenback) 1.6%

== Oregon ==
Oregon held its election early on June 7, 1880.

District	Incumbent			This race	
District	Member	Party	First elected	Results	Candidates
Oregon at-large	John Whiteaker	Democratic	1878	Incumbent lost re-election. Republican gain.	▌ ✓ Melvin Clark George (Republican) 51.4%; ▌John Whiteaker (Democratic) 47.8%; ▌James K. Sears (Greenback) 0.8%

== Pennsylvania ==
District	Incumbent			This race	
District	Member	Party	First elected	Results	Candidates
Pennsylvania 1	Henry H. Bingham	Republican	1878	Incumbent re-elected.	▌ ✓ Henry H. Bingham (Republican) 57.2%; ▌George R. Snowden (Democratic) 42.8%
Pennsylvania 2	Charles O'Neill	Republican	1872	Incumbent re-elected.	▌ ✓ Charles O'Neill (Republican) 60.9%; ▌A. S. Hartranft (Democratic) 39.0%; ▌J. W. Schuckers (Greenback) 0.1%
Pennsylvania 3	Samuel J. Randall	Democratic	1862	Incumbent re-elected.	▌ ✓ Samuel J. Randall (Democratic) 57.8%; ▌Benjamin L. Berry (Republican) 42.0%; ▌DeWitt C. Davis (Greenback) 0.2%
Pennsylvania 4	William D. Kelley	Republican	1860	Incumbent re-elected.	▌ ✓ William D. Kelley (Republican) 61.2%; ▌George Bull (Democratic) 38.8%
Pennsylvania 5	Alfred C. Harmer	Republican	1876	Incumbent re-elected.	▌ ✓ Alfred C. Harmer (Republican) 57.2%; ▌John K. Folwell (Democratic) 42.2%; ▌Uriah S. Stephens (Greenback) 0.5%
Pennsylvania 6	William Ward	Republican	1876	Incumbent re-elected.	▌ ✓ William Ward (Republican) 60.3%; ▌R. Jones Monaghan (Democratic) 38.9%; ▌Samuel Cornett (Prohibition) 0.7%
Pennsylvania 7	William Godshalk	Republican	1878	Incumbent re-elected.	▌ ✓ William Godshalk (Republican) 52.6%; ▌John Slingluff (Democratic) 47.1%; ▌R. R. Tomlinson (Greenback) 0.3%
Pennsylvania 8	Hiester Clymer	Democratic	1872	Incumbent retired. Democratic hold.	▌ ✓ Daniel Ermentrout (Democratic) 63.1%; ▌J. Howard Jacobs (Republican) 36.0%; ▌P. J. Altenderfer (Greenback) 0.9%
Pennsylvania 9	A. Herr Smith	Republican	1872	Incumbent re-elected.	▌ ✓ A. Herr Smith (Republican) 64.3%; ▌J. L. Steinmetz (Democratic) 35.2%; ▌E. S. Heaney (Greenback) 0.5%
Pennsylvania 10	Reuben K. Bachman	Democratic	1878	Incumbent retired. Democratic hold.	▌ ✓ William Mutchler (Democratic) 61.3%; ▌Hiram H. Fisher (Republican) 38.1%; ▌William Howard (Greenback) 0.6%
Pennsylvania 11	Robert Klotz	Democratic	1878	Incumbent re-elected.	▌ ✓ Robert Klotz (Democratic) 62.3%; ▌William J. Scott (Republican) 36.1%; ▌J. B. Robison (Greenback) 1.6%
Pennsylvania 12	Hendrick B. Wright	Greenback	1876	Incumbent lost re-election. Republican gain.	▌ ✓ Joseph A. Scranton (Republican) 47.1%; ▌Daniel W. Connolly (Democratic) 38.3%; ▌Hendrick B. Wright (Greenback) 14.5%; ▌Ambrose F. Brundage (Prohibition) 0.1%
Pennsylvania 13	John W. Ryon	Democratic	1878	Incumbent lost re-election. Greenback gain.	▌ ✓ Charles N. Brumm (Greenback) 52.2%; ▌John W. Ryon (Democratic) 47.8%
Pennsylvania 14	John W. Killinger	Republican	1876	Incumbent retired. Republican hold.	▌ ✓ Samuel F. Barr (Republican) 52.7%; ▌Grant Weldman (Democratic) 45.4%; ▌J. Adam Cake (Greenback) 2.0%
Pennsylvania 15	Edward Overton Jr.	Republican	1876	Incumbent lost renomination. Republican hold.	▌ ✓ Cornelius C. Jadwin (Republican) 55.2%; ▌Robert H. Packer (Democratic) 41.2%; ▌Joshua Burrows (Greenback) 2.9%; ▌L. A. Smith (Prohibition) 0.6%
Pennsylvania 16	John I. Mitchell	Republican	1876	Incumbent retired to run for U.S. senator. Republican hold.	▌ ✓ Robert J. C. Walker (Republican) 50.8%; ▌David Kirk (Greenback) 49.2%
Pennsylvania 17	Alexander H. Coffroth	Democratic	1878	Incumbent lost re-election. Republican gain.	▌ ✓ Jacob M. Campbell (Republican) 51.6%; ▌Alexander H. Coffroth (Democratic) 47.3%; ▌Theodore P. Rynder (Greenback) 1.2%
Pennsylvania 18	Horatio G. Fisher	Republican	1878	Incumbent re-elected.	▌ ✓ Horatio G. Fisher (Republican) 51.1%; ▌R. Milton Speer (Democratic) 48.9%
Pennsylvania 19	Frank E. Beltzhoover	Democratic	1878	Incumbent re-elected.	▌ ✓ Frank E. Beltzhoover (Democratic) 57.5%; ▌Charles J. Little (Republican) 42.3%; ▌John Moore (Greenback) 0.2%
Pennsylvania 20	Seth H. Yocum	Greenback	1878	Incumbent retired. Democratic gain.	▌ ✓ Andrew G. Curtin (Democratic) 54.7%; ▌Thomas H. Murray (Republican) 45.3%
Pennsylvania 21	Morgan R. Wise	Democratic	1878	Incumbent re-elected.	▌ ✓ Morgan R. Wise (Democratic) 53.7%; ▌James E. Sayers (Republican) 34.5%; ▌George W. Minor (Greenback) 11.8%
Pennsylvania 22	Russell Errett	Republican	1876	Incumbent re-elected.	▌ ✓ Russell Errett (Republican) 53.3%; ▌James H. Hopkins (Democratic) 41.1%; ▌Michael J. Sullivan (Greenback) 5.6%
Pennsylvania 23	Thomas M. Bayne	Republican	1876	Incumbent re-elected.	▌ ✓ Thomas M. Bayne (Republican) 63.2%; ▌George T. Miller (Democratic) 33.5%; ▌Jonathan H. Stevenson (Greenback) 3.3%
Pennsylvania 24	William S. Shallenberger	Republican	1876	Incumbent re-elected.	▌ ✓ William S. Shallenberger (Republican) 56.6%; ▌J. Murray Clark (Democratic) 39.9%; ▌Henry M. Close (Greenback) 3.5%
Pennsylvania 25	Harry White	Republican	1876	Incumbent lost re-election. Greenback gain.	▌ ✓ James Mosgrove (Greenback) 51.2%; ▌Harry White (Republican) 48.8%
Pennsylvania 26	Samuel B. Dick	Republican	1878	Incumbent retired. Republican hold.	▌ ✓ Samuel H. Miller (Republican) 47.9%; ▌James H. Caldwell (Democratic) 40.7%; ▌William C. Plummer (Greenback) 10.6%; ▌Cyrus Cummings (Prohibition) 0.9%
Pennsylvania 27	James H. Osmer	Republican	1878	Incumbent retired. Republican hold.	▌ ✓ Lewis F. Watson (Republican) 52.0%; ▌Alfred Short (Democratic) 47.7%; ▌L. G. Rosenbury (Prohibition) 0.4%

== Rhode Island ==
District	Incumbent			This race	
District	Member	Party	First elected	Results	Candidates
Rhode Island 1	Nelson W. Aldrich	Republican	1878	Incumbent re-elected.	▌ ✓ Nelson W. Aldrich (Republican) 66.6%; ▌Isaac Lawrence (Democratic) 32.2%; ▌Henry Cram (Greenback) 1.2%
Rhode Island 2	Latimer W. Ballou	Republican	1874	Incumbent retired. Republican hold.	▌ ✓ Jonathan Chace (Republican) 58.1%; ▌Franklin Treat (Democratic) 41.2%; ▌John F. Smith (Greenback) 0.6%

== South Carolina ==
District	Incumbent			This race	
District	Member	Party	First elected	Results	Candidates
South Carolina 1	John S. Richardson	Democratic	1878	Incumbent re-elected.	▌ ✓ John S. Richardson (Democratic) 63.3%; ▌Samuel J. Lee (Republican) 36.7%
South Carolina 2	Michael P. O'Connor	Democratic	1878	Incumbent re-elected.	▌ ✓ Michael P. O'Connor (Democratic) 58.8%; ▌Edmund W. M. Mackey (Republican) 41.2%
South Carolina 3	D. Wyatt Aiken	Democratic	1876	Incumbent re-elected.	▌ ✓ D. Wyatt Aiken (Democratic) 74.1%; ▌C. J. Stollbrand (Republican) 25.9%
South Carolina 4	John H. Evins	Democratic	1876	Incumbent re-elected.	▌ ✓ John H. Evins (Democratic) 69.7%; ▌A. Blythe (Republican) 29.3%; ▌J. Hendrix McLane (Greenback) 1.0%
South Carolina 5	George D. Tillman	Democratic	1878	Incumbent re-elected.	▌ ✓ George D. Tillman (Democratic) 60.4%; ▌Robert Smalls (Republican) 39.6%

== Tennessee ==
District	Incumbent			This race	
District	Member	Party	First elected	Results	Candidates
Tennessee 1	Robert L. Taylor	Democratic	1878	Incumbent lost re-election. Republican gain.	▌ ✓ A. H. Pettibone (Republican) 52.47%; ▌Robert L. Taylor (Democratic) 47.53%
Tennessee 2	Leonidas C. Houk	Republican	1878	Incumbent re-elected.	▌ ✓ Leonidas C. Houk (Republican) 65.08%; ▌Thomas L. Williams (Democratic) 34.92%
Tennessee 3	George G. Dibrell	Democratic	1874	Incumbent re-elected.	▌ ✓ George G. Dibrell (Democratic) 53.58%; ▌Xenophon Wheeler (Republican) 41.49%; ▌John James (Greenback) 4.93%
Tennessee 4	Benton McMillin	Democratic	1878	Incumbent re-elected.	▌ ✓ Benton McMillin (Democratic) 64.95%; ▌R. C. Sanders (Republican) 35.05%
Tennessee 5	John M. Bright	Democratic	1870	Incumbent lost re-election as an Independent Democrat. Democratic hold.	▌ ✓ Richard Warner (Democratic) 36.30%; ▌John M. Bright (Ind. Democratic) 29.44%; ▌J. H. Holman (Republican) 23.70%; ▌Lewis Tillman (Greenback) 10.56%
Tennessee 6	John F. House	Democratic	1874	Incumbent re-elected.	▌ ✓ John F. House (Democratic) 60.57%; ▌Andrew M. McClain (Republican) 36.38%; ▌B. F. Brooks (Ind. Democratic) 3.05%
Tennessee 7	Washington C. Whitthorne	Democratic	1870	Incumbent re-elected.	▌ ✓ Washington C. Whitthorne (Democratic) 57.99%; ▌A. M. Hughes (Republican) 42.02%
Tennessee 8	John D. C. Atkins	Democratic	1872	Incumbent re-elected.	▌ ✓ John D. C. Atkins (Democratic) 46.62%; ▌Samuel W. Hawkins (Republican) 41.84%; ▌W. E. Travis (Democratic) 11.54%
Tennessee 9	Charles B. Simonton	Democratic	1878	Incumbent re-elected.	▌ ✓ Charles B. Simonton (Democratic) 52.79%; ▌J. T. Shackleford (Republican) 47.21%
Tennessee 10	H. Casey Young	Democratic	1874	Incumbent lost re-election. Republican gain.	▌ ✓ William R. Moore (Republican) 54.79%; ▌H. Casey Young (Democratic) 47.05%; ▌Thomas A. Hamilton (Republican) 2.17%; ▌G. L. Harris (Greenback) 0.11%

== Texas ==
Texas held elections for its six members on June 1, 1880.

District	Incumbent			This race	
District	Member	Party	First elected	Results	Candidates
Texas 1	John H. Reagan	Democratic	1874	Incumbent re-elected.	▌ ✓ John H. Reagan (Democratic) 77.7%; ▌S. R. Withers (Republican) 22.3%
Texas 2	David B. Culberson	Democratic	1874	Incumbent re-elected.	▌ ✓ David B. Culberson (Democratic) 68.6%; ▌Henry F. O'Neal (Greenback) 31.4%
Texas 3	Olin Wellborn	Democratic	1878	Incumbent re-elected.	▌ ✓ Olin Wellborn (Democratic) 78.7%; ▌Jerome C. Kirby (Greenback) 21.3%
Texas 4	Roger Q. Mills	Democratic	1872	Incumbent re-elected.	▌ ✓ Roger Q. Mills (Democratic) 62.6%; ▌John T. Brady (Greenback) 37.4%
Texas 5	George W. Jones	Greenback	1878	Incumbent re-elected.	▌ ✓ George W. Jones (Greenback) 50.3%; ▌Seth Shepard (Democratic) 49.7%
Texas 6	Christopher C. Upson	Democratic	1879 (special)	Incumbent re-elected.	▌ ✓ Christopher C. Upson (Democratic) 97.3%; ▌D. B. Robertson (Greenback) 2.3%

== Vermont ==
Vermont held elections for its three members on September 7, 1880.

District	Incumbent			This race	
District	Member	Party	First elected	Results	Candidates
Vermont 1	Charles H. Joyce	Republican	1874	Incumbent re-elected.	▌ ✓ Charles H. Joyce (Republican) 68.6%; ▌Jean J. Randall (Democratic) 29.7%; ▌Carlos C. Martin (Greenback) 1.6%
Vermont 2	James M. Tyler	Republican	1878	Incumbent re-elected.	▌ ✓ James M. Tyler (Republican) 69.0%; ▌Daniel Campbell (Democratic) 29.0%; ▌John B. Mead (Republican) 1.8%; ▌Luke P. Poland (Republican) 0.2%
Vermont 3	Bradley Barlow	Greenback	1878	Incumbent retired. Republican gain.	▌ ✓ William W. Grout (Republican) 60.2%; ▌John W. Currier (Democratic) 30.9%; ▌Fletcher Tarbell (Greenback) 6.1%; ▌H. Henry Powers (Republican) 2.4%; ▌Henry Ballard (Republican) 0.4%

== Virginia ==
District	Incumbent			This race	
District	Member	Party	First elected	Results	Candidates
Virginia 1	Richard L. T. Beale	Democratic	1879 (special)	Incumbent retired. Democratic hold.	▌ ✓ George T. Garrison (Democratic) 48.2%; ▌John W. Woltz (Republican) 42.6%; ▌John Critcher (Readjuster) 9.2%
Virginia 2	John Goode	Democratic	1874	Incumbent lost re-election. Republican gain.	▌ ✓ John F. Dezendorf (Republican) 52.6%; ▌John Goode (Democratic) 34.6%; ▌Benjamin W. Lacy (Readjuster) 12.8%
Virginia 3	Joseph E. Johnston	Democratic	1878	Incumbent retired. Democratic hold.	▌ ✓ George D. Wise (Democratic) 55.9%; ▌John S. Wise (Readjuster) 43.8%; ▌H. L. Pelonze (Republican) 0.2%
Virginia 4	Joseph Jorgensen	Republican	1876	Incumbent re-elected.	▌ ✓ Joseph Jorgensen (Republican) 70.1%; ▌Samuel F. Coleman (Democratic) 29.2%; ▌William E. Cameron (Independent) 0.7%
Virginia 5	George Cabell	Democratic	1874	Incumbent re-elected.	▌ ✓ George Cabell (Democratic) 51.3%; ▌John T. Stovall (Readjuster) 48.7%
Virginia 6	J. Randolph Tucker	Democratic	1874	Incumbent re-elected.	▌ ✓ J. Randolph Tucker (Democratic) 59.6%; ▌James A. Frazier (Readjuster) 40.4%; ▌David J. Woodfin (Republican) 0.0%
Virginia 7	John T. Harris	Democratic	1872	Incumbent retired. Readjuster gain.	▌ ✓ John Paul (Readjuster) 49.3%; ▌Henry C. Allen (Democratic) 45.9%; ▌William P. Moseley (Republican) 4.8%
Virginia 8	Eppa Hunton	Democratic	1872	Incumbent retired. Democratic hold.	▌ ✓ John S. Barbour Jr. (Democratic) 56.7%; ▌Sampson P. Bagley (Republican) 33.3%; ▌James H. Williams (Readjuster) 9.9%
Virginia 9	James B. Richmond	Democratic	1878	Incumbent lost renomination. Readjuster gain.	▌ ✓ Abram Fulkerson (Readjuster) 40.8%; ▌Connally F. Trigg (Democratic) 38.4%; ▌G. G. Goodell (Republican) 18.3%; ▌Fayette McMullen (Independent) 2.4%; ▌Wayman A. Starman (Unknown) 0.1%

== West Virginia ==
District	Incumbent			This race	
District	Member	Party	First elected	Results	Candidates
West Virginia 1	Benjamin Wilson	Democratic	1874	Incumbent re-elected.	▌ ✓ Benjamin Wilson (Democratic) 46.55%; ▌John H. Hutchinson (Republican) 46.27%; ▌James Bassell (Greenback) 7.18%
West Virginia 2	Benjamin F. Martin	Democratic	1876	Incumbent lost renomination. Democratic hold.	▌ ✓ John B. Hoge (Democratic) 50.77%; ▌J. T. Hoke (Republican) 42.88%; ▌Daniel D. T. Farnsworth (Greenback) 6.35%
West Virginia 3	John E. Kenna	Democratic	1876	Incumbent re-elected.	▌ ✓ John E. Kenna (Democratic) 57.08%; ▌Henry I. Walker (Republican) 42.92%

== Wisconsin ==
Wisconsin elected eight members of congress on Election Day, November 2, 1880.

District	Incumbent			This race	
District	Member	Party	First elected	Results	Candidates
Wisconsin 1	Charles G. Williams	Republican	1872	Incumbent re-elected.	▌ ✓ Charles G. Williams (Republican) 61.0%; ▌Clinton Babbitt (Democratic) 37.8%; ▌A. H. Craig (Greenback) 1.1%
Wisconsin 2	Lucien B. Caswell	Republican	1874	Incumbent re-elected.	▌ ✓ Lucien B. Caswell (Republican) 52.0%; ▌Jared C. Gregory (Democratic) 46.6%; ▌Robert P. Main (Greenback) 1.4%
Wisconsin 3	George C. Hazelton	Republican	1876	Incumbent re-elected.	▌ ✓ George C. Hazelton (Republican) 55.6%; ▌Montgomery M. Cothren (Democratic) 44.3%; ▌S. N. Jones (Greenback) 0.2%
Wisconsin 4	Peter V. Deuster	Democratic	1878	Incumbent re-elected.	▌ ✓ Peter V. Deuster (Democratic) 53.7%; ▌Casper Sanger (Republican) 45.9%; ▌George Godfrey (Greenback) 0.4%
Wisconsin 5	Edward S. Bragg	Democratic	1876	Incumbent re-elected.	▌ ✓ Edward S. Bragg (Democratic) 51.6%; ▌Elihu Colman (Republican) 44.8%; ▌John E. Thomas (Greenback) 3.6%
Wisconsin 6	Gabriel Bouck	Democratic	1876	Incumbent lost re-election. Republican gain.	▌ ✓ Richard W. Guenther (Republican) 52.5%; ▌Gabriel Bouck (Democratic) 43.8%; ▌L. A. Stewart (Greenback) 3.7%
Wisconsin 7	Herman L. Humphrey	Republican	1876	Incumbent re-elected.	▌ ✓ Herman L. Humphrey (Republican) 64.6%; ▌George Y. Freeman (Democratic) 30.7%; ▌Joel Foster (Greenback) 4.7%
Wisconsin 8	Thaddeus C. Pound	Republican	1876	Incumbent re-elected.	▌ ✓ Thaddeus C. Pound (Republican) 56.8%; ▌Willis C. Silverthorn (Democratic) 43.0%; ▌James Meehan (Greenback) 0.1%

== Non-voting delegates ==
District	Incumbent			This race	
District	Member	Party	First elected	Results	Candidates
Arizona Territory	John G. Campbell	Democratic	1878	Incumbent retired. Democratic hold.	▌ ✓ G. H. Oury (Democratic)
Dakota Territory	Granville G. Bennett	Republican	1878	Incumbent retired. Republican hold.	▌ ✓ Richard F. Pettigrew (Republican)
Idaho Territory	George Ainslie	Democratic	1878	Incumbent re-elected.	▌ ✓ George Ainslie (Democratic) 56.92%; ▌Alanson Smith (Republican) 31.83%; ▌Mason Brayman (Independent) 11.24%
Montana Territory	Martin Maginnis	Democratic	1872	Incumbent re-elected.	▌ ✓ Martin Maginnis (Democratic) 54.94%; ▌Wilbur F. Sanders (Republican) 45.06%
New Mexico Territory	Mariano S. Otero	Republican	1878	Incumbent retired. Republican hold.	▌ ✓ Tranquilino Luna (Republican)
Utah Territory	George Q. Cannon	Republican	1872	Incumbent re-elected.	▌ ✓ George Q. Cannon (Republican) 93.2%; ▌Allen G. Campbell (Democratic) 6.8%
Utah Territory	George Q. Cannon	Republican	1872	Election successfully contested by Allen G. Campbell (D). Congress refused to seat representative-elect. Republican loss.	▌ ✓ George Q. Cannon (Republican) 93.2%; ▌Allen G. Campbell (Democratic) 6.8%
Washington Territory	Thomas H. Brents	Republican	1878	Incumbent re-elected.	▌ ✓ Thomas H. Brents (Republican) 55.7%; ▌Thomas Burke (Democratic) 44.3%
Wyoming Territory	Stephen W. Downey	Republican	1878	Incumbent retired. Democratic gain.	▌ ✓ Morton E. Post (Democratic) 50.96%; ▌Alexander Hamilton Swan (Republican) 49.04%

== See also ==
- 1880 United States elections
  - 1880 United States presidential election
  - 1880–81 United States Senate elections
- 1881 United States House of Representatives elections
- 46th United States Congress
- 47th United States Congress

== Bibliography ==
- Dubin, Michael J. (March 1, 1998). United States Congressional Elections, 1788-1997: The Official Results of the Elections of the 1st Through 105th Congresses. McFarland and Company. ISBN 978-0786402830.
- Martis, Kenneth C. (January 1, 1989). The Historical Atlas of Political Parties in the United States Congress, 1789-1989. Macmillan Publishing Company. ISBN 978-0029201701.
- Moore, John L., ed. (1994). Congressional Quarterly's Guide to U.S. Elections (Third ed.). Congressional Quarterly Inc. ISBN 978-0871879967.
- "Party Divisions of the House of Representatives* 1789–Present". Office of the Historian, House of United States House of Representatives.
