= 1878 United States House of Representatives elections in South Carolina =

The 1878 United States House of Representatives elections in South Carolina were held on November 5, 1878, to select five Representatives for two-year terms from the state of South Carolina. Two Democratic incumbents were re-elected, two Republican incumbents were defeated and the open seat was picked up by the Democrats. The composition of the state delegation after the election was solely Democratic.

== Voter fraud ==
South Carolina was one state rampant with voter fraud, particularly through the use of tissue ballots, thin ballots hidden in the normal ballot, typically 10 to 20 at a time. The almost statewide exclusion of Republicans as Commissioners of Elections, and the ensuing appointment of nearly all Democratic Managers of Elections, allowed to Democratic Managers to perpetrate this scheme. When the votes were counted and more votes than voters were found, the Managers removed and destroyed the Republican ballots resulting in the complete takeover of the state.

== 1st congressional district ==
Incumbent Republican Congressman Joseph Rainey of the 1st congressional district, in office since 1870, was defeated by Democratic challenger John S. Richardson.

=== General election results ===
South Carolina's 1st congressional district election results, 1878
Party	Candidate	Votes	%	±%
Democratic	John S. Richardson	22,707	61.7	+13.9
Republican	Joseph Rainey (incumbent)	14,096	38.3	−13.9
Majority		8,611	23.4	+19.0
Turnout		36,803		
Democratic gain from Republican				

== 2nd congressional district ==
Incumbent Republican Congressman Richard H. Cain of the 2nd congressional district, in office since 1877, declined to seek re-election. Democrat Michael P. O'Connor, a contestant in the 1876 election, defeated Republican Edmund William McGregor Mackey in the general election.

=== General election results ===
South Carolina's 2nd congressional district election results, 1878
Party	Candidate	Votes	%	±%
Democratic	Michael P. O'Connor	20,568	60.9	+23.0
Republican	Edmund W.M. Mackey	13,182	39.1	−23.0
No party	Write-Ins	11	0.0	0.0
Majority		7,386	21.8	−2.4
Turnout		33,761		
Democratic gain from Republican				

== 3rd congressional district ==
Incumbent Democratic Congressman D. Wyatt Aiken of the 3rd congressional district, in office since 1877, defeated Republican challenger J.F. Ensor.

=== General election results ===
South Carolina's 3rd congressional district election results, 1878
Party	Candidate	Votes	%	±%
Democratic	D. Wyatt Aiken (incumbent)	24,533	79.1	+21.1
Republican	J.F. Ensor	6,348	20.5	−21.5
No party	Write-Ins	138	0.4	+0.4
Majority		18,185	58.6	+42.6
Turnout		31,019		
Democratic hold				

== 4th congressional district ==
Incumbent Democratic Congressman John H. Evins of the 4th congressional district, in office since 1877, defeated Republican challenger Alexander S. Wallace.

=== General election results ===
South Carolina's 4th congressional district election results, 1878
Party	Candidate	Votes	%	±%
Democratic	John H. Evins (incumbent)	22,702	96.8	+39.2
Republican	Alexander S. Wallace	741	3.2	−39.2
Majority		21,961	93.6	−78.4
Turnout		23,443		
Democratic hold				

== 5th congressional district ==
Incumbent Republican Congressman Robert Smalls of the 5th congressional district, in office since 1875, was defeated by Democratic challenger George D. Tillman.

=== General election results ===
South Carolina's 5th congressional district election results, 1878
Party	Candidate	Votes	%	±%
Democratic	George D. Tillman	26,409	71.2	+23.1
Republican	Robert Smalls (incumbent)	10,664	28.8	−23.1
No party	Write-Ins	3	0.0	0.0
Majority		15,745	42.4	+38.6
Turnout		37,076		
Democratic gain from Republican				

== See also ==
- United States House of Representatives elections, 1878
- South Carolina gubernatorial election, 1878
- South Carolina's congressional districts
