= 1880 United States House of Representatives elections in South Carolina =

The 1880 United States House of Representatives elections in South Carolina were held on November 2, 1880, to elect five representatives Representatives for two-year terms from the state of South Carolina. All five incumbents were re-elected and the composition of the state delegation remained solely Democratic.

== 1st congressional district ==
Incumbent Democratic Congressman John S. Richardson of the 1st congressional district, in office since 1879, defeated Republican challenger Samuel J. Lee.

=== General election results ===
South Carolina's 1st congressional district election results, 1880
| Party | Candidate | Votes | % | ±% |
|---|---|---|---|---|
| Democratic | John S. Richardson (incumbent) | 20,142 | 63.3 | +1.6 |
| Republican | Samuel J. Lee | 11,674 | 36.7 | −1.6 |
| Majority | | 8,468 | 26.6 | +3.2 |
| Turnout | | 31,816 | | |
| Democratic hold | | | | |

== 2nd congressional district ==
Incumbent Democratic Congressman Michael P. O'Connor of the 2nd congressional district, in office since 1879, defeated Republican challenger Edmund W.M. Mackey.

=== General election results ===
South Carolina's 2nd congressional district election results, 1880
| Party | Candidate | Votes | % | ±% |
|---|---|---|---|---|
| Democratic | Michael P. O'Connor (incumbent) | 17,569 | 58.8 | −2.1 |
| Republican | Edmund W.M. Mackey | 12,297 | 41.2 | +2.1 |
| Majority | | 5,272 | 17.6 | −4.2 |
| Turnout | | 29,866 | | |
| Democratic hold | | | | |

== 3rd congressional district ==
Incumbent Democratic Congressman D. Wyatt Aiken of the 3rd congressional district, in office since 1877, defeated Republican challenger C.J. Stollbrand.

=== General election results ===
South Carolina's 3rd congressional district election results, 1880
| Party | Candidate | Votes | % | ±% |
|---|---|---|---|---|
| Democratic | D. Wyatt Aiken (incumbent) | 27,863 | 74.1 | −5.0 |
| Republican | C.J. Stollbrand | 9,758 | 25.9 | +5.4 |
| Majority | | 18,105 | 48.2 | −10.4 |
| Turnout | | 37,621 | | |
| Democratic hold | | | | |

== 4th congressional district ==
Incumbent Democratic Congressman John H. Evins of the 4th congressional district, in office since 1877, defeated Republican challenger A. Blythe.

=== General election results ===
South Carolina's 4th congressional district election results, 1880
| Party | Candidate | Votes | % | ±% |
|---|---|---|---|---|
| Democratic | John H. Evins (incumbent) | 27,985 | 69.7 | −27.1 |
| Republican | A. Blythe | 11,780 | 29.3 | +26.1 |
| Greenback-Labor | J. Hendrix McLane | 414 | 1.0 | +1.0 |
| Majority | | 16,205 | 40.4 | −53.2 |
| Turnout | | 40,179 | | |
| Democratic hold | | | | |

== 5th congressional district ==
Incumbent Democratic Congressman George D. Tillman of the 5th congressional district, in office since 1879, defeated Republican challenger Robert Smalls.

=== General election results ===
South Carolina's 5th congressional district election results, 1880
| Party | Candidate | Votes | % | ±% |
|---|---|---|---|---|
| Democratic | George D. Tillman (incumbent) | 23,325 | 60.4 | −10.8 |
| Republican | Robert Smalls | 15,287 | 39.6 | +10.8 |
| No party | Write-Ins | 2 | 0.0 | 0.0 |
| Majority | | 8,038 | 20.8 | −21.6 |
| Turnout | | 38,614 | | |
| Democratic hold | | | | |

== See also ==
- United States House of Representatives elections, 1880
- South Carolina gubernatorial election, 1880
- South Carolina's congressional districts
