= 1884 United States House of Representatives elections in South Carolina =

The 1884 United States House of Representatives elections in South Carolina were held on November 4, 1884, to select seven Representatives for two-year terms from the state of South Carolina. Five incumbents were re-elected and the two open seats were split between the Democrats and the Republicans. The composition of the state delegation after the election was six Democrats and one Republican.

== 1st congressional district ==
Incumbent Democratic Congressman Samuel Dibble of the 1st congressional district, in office since 1883, defeated Republican challenger W.N. Taft.

=== General election results ===
South Carolina's 1st congressional district election results, 1884
| Party | Candidate | Votes | % | ±% |
|---|---|---|---|---|
| Democratic | Samuel Dibble (incumbent) | 8,612 | 73.5 | +16.6 |
| Republican | W.N. Taft | 3,108 | 26.5 | −16.6 |
| Majority | | 5,504 | 47.0 | +33.2 |
| Turnout | | 11,720 | | |
| Democratic hold | | | | |

== 2nd congressional district ==
Incumbent Democratic Congressman George D. Tillman of the 2nd congressional district, in office since 1883, defeated Republican challenger E.J. Dickerson.

=== General election results ===
South Carolina's 2nd congressional district election results, 1884
| Party | Candidate | Votes | % | ±% |
|---|---|---|---|---|
| Democratic | George D. Tillman (incumbent) | 11,419 | 84.4 | +16.6 |
| Republican | E.J. Dickerson | 1,920 | 14.2 | −17.7 |
| No party | Write-Ins | 186 | 1.4 | +1.1 |
| Majority | | 9,499 | 70.2 | +34.3 |
| Turnout | | 13,525 | | |
| Democratic hold | | | | |

== 3rd congressional district ==
Incumbent Democratic Congressman D. Wyatt Aiken of the 3rd congressional district, in office since 1877, defeated Republican challenger John R. Tolbert.

=== General election results ===
South Carolina's 3rd congressional district election results, 1884
| Party | Candidate | Votes | % | ±% |
|---|---|---|---|---|
| Democratic | D. Wyatt Aiken (incumbent) | 10,855 | 93.5 | +8.9 |
| Republican | John R. Tolbert | 752 | 6.5 | −8.9 |
| No party | Write-Ins | 6 | 0.0 | 0.0 |
| Majority | | 10,103 | 87.0 | +17.8 |
| Turnout | | 11,613 | | |
| Democratic hold | | | | |

== 4th congressional district special election ==
Incumbent Democratic Congressman John H. Evins of the 4th congressional district, in office since 1877, died on October 20, 1884. A special election was called for December and Democrat John Bratton was unopposed in his bid to serve the rest of the term for the 48th Congress.

=== General election results ===
South Carolina's 4th congressional district special election results, 1884
| Party | Candidate | Votes | % | ±% |
|---|---|---|---|---|
| Democratic | John Bratton | 3,339 | 100.0 | +28.2 |
| Majority | | 3,339 | 100.0 | +56.6 |
| Turnout | | 3,339 | | |
| Democratic hold | | | | |

== 4th congressional district ==
Incumbent Democratic Congressman John H. Evins of the 4th congressional district, in office since 1877, died on October 20, 1884. William H. Perry was nominated by the Democrats and was unopposed in his bid for election to the 49th Congress.

=== General election results ===
South Carolina's 4th congressional district election results, 1884
| Party | Candidate | Votes | % | ±% |
|---|---|---|---|---|
| Democratic | William H. Perry | 13,008 | 99.4 | −0.6 |
| No party | Write-Ins | 81 | 0.6 | +0.6 |
| Majority | | 12,927 | 98.8 | −1.2 |
| Turnout | | 13,089 | | |
| Democratic hold | | | | |

== 5th congressional district ==
Incumbent Democratic Congressman John J. Hemphill of the 5th congressional district, in office since 1883, defeated Republican challenger C.C. Macoy.

=== General election results ===
South Carolina's 5th congressional district election results, 1884
| Party | Candidate | Votes | % | ±% |
|---|---|---|---|---|
| Democratic | John J. Hemphill (incumbent) | 9,861 | 74.5 | +18.5 |
| Republican | C.C. Macoy | 2,881 | 21.8 | −22.2 |
| No party | Write-Ins | 489 | 3.7 | +3.7 |
| Majority | | 6,980 | 52.7 | +40.7 |
| Turnout | | 13,231 | | |
| Democratic hold | | | | |

== 6th congressional district ==
Incumbent Democratic Congressman George W. Dargan of the 6th congressional district, in office since 1883, defeated Republican challenger Edmund H. Deas.

=== General election results ===
South Carolina's 6th congressional district election results, 1884
| Party | Candidate | Votes | % | ±% |
|---|---|---|---|---|
| Democratic | George W. Dargan (incumbent) | 10,465 | 74.0 | +9.3 |
| Republican | Edmund H. Deas | 3,289 | 23.3 | +1.6 |
| No party | Write-Ins | 386 | 2.7 | +2.7 |
| Majority | | 7,176 | 50.7 | +7.7 |
| Turnout | | 14,140 | | |
| Democratic hold | | | | |

== 7th congressional district special election ==
Incumbent Republican Congressman Edmund William McGregor Mackey of the 7th congressional district, in office since 1883, died on January 27, 1884. A special election was called for March 18 and Republican Robert Smalls was unopposed in his bid for election.

=== General election results ===
South Carolina's 7th congressional district special election results, 1884
| Party | Candidate | Votes | % | ±% |
|---|---|---|---|---|
| Republican | Robert Smalls | 9,092 | 99.6 | +34.8 |
| No party | Write-Ins | 32 | 0.4 | +0.4 |
| Majority | | 9,060 | 99.2 | +69.6 |
| Turnout | | 9,124 | | |
| Republican hold | | | | |

== 7th congressional district ==
Incumbent Republican Congressman Robert Smalls of the 7th congressional district, in office since 1884, defeated Democratic challenger William Elliott.

=== General election results ===
South Carolina's 7th congressional district election results, 1884
| Party | Candidate | Votes | % | ±% |
|---|---|---|---|---|
| Republican | Robert Smalls (incumbent) | 8,419 | 63.6 | −36.0 |
| Democratic | William Elliott | 4,584 | 34.6 | +34.6 |
| No party | Write-Ins | 235 | 1.8 | +1.4 |
| Majority | | 3,835 | 29.0 | −70.2 |
| Turnout | | 13,238 | | |
| Republican hold | | | | |

== See also ==
- United States House of Representatives elections, 1884
- South Carolina gubernatorial election, 1884
- South Carolina's congressional districts
