= 1876 United States House of Representatives elections in South Carolina =

The 1876 United States House of Representatives elections in South Carolina were held on November 7, 1876, to select five Representatives for two-year terms from the state of South Carolina. Two incumbents were re-elected, one was defeated for re-election, and the Democrats picked up one of the two open seats from the Republicans. The composition of the state delegation after the election was three Republicans and two Democrats.

== 1st congressional district ==
Incumbent Republican Congressman Joseph Rainey of the 1st congressional district, in office since 1870, defeated Democratic challenger John S. Richardson.

=== General election results ===
South Carolina's 1st congressional district election results, 1876
Party	Candidate	Votes	%	±%
Republican	Joseph Rainey (incumbent)	18,180	52.2	+0.8
Democratic	John S. Richardson	16,661	47.8	−0.8
No party	Write-Ins	1	0.0	0.0
Majority		1,519	4.4	+1.6
Turnout		34,842		
Republican hold				

== 2nd congressional district special election ==
The Congress declared the seat for the 2nd congressional district vacant on July 19, 1876, after Charles W. Buttz successfully contested the 1874 election. A special election was called to be held simultaneously with the regular election. Charles W. Buttz was nominated by the Republicans and he defeated Democrat Michael P. O'Connor in the special election.

=== General election results ===
South Carolina's 2nd congressional district special election results, 1876
Party	Candidate	Votes	%	±%
Republican	Charles W. Buttz	21,378	62.1	+16.2
Democratic	Michael P. O'Connor	13,030	37.9	+37.9
No party	Write-Ins	2	0.0	0.0
Majority		8,348	24.2	+16.0
Turnout		34,410		
Republican gain from Independent Republican				

== 2nd congressional district ==
Richard H. Cain was nominated by the Republicans for the regular election of the 2nd congressional district and he defeated Democratic challenger Michael P. O'Connor.

=== General election results ===
South Carolina's 2nd congressional district election results, 1876
Party	Candidate	Votes	%	±%
Republican	Richard H. Cain	21,385	62.1	0.0
Democratic	Michael P. O'Connor	13,028	37.9	0.0
No party	Write-Ins	2	0.0	0.0
Majority		8,357	24.2	0.0
Turnout		34,415		
Republican hold				

== 3rd congressional district ==
Incumbent Republican Congressman Solomon L. Hoge of the 3rd congressional district, in office since 1875, declined to seek re-election. D. Wyatt Aiken was nominated by the Democrats and he defeated Republican Lewis C. Carpenter.

=== General election results ===
South Carolina's 3rd congressional district election results, 1876
Party	Candidate	Votes	%	±%
Democratic	D. Wyatt Aiken	21,479	58.0	+14.1
Republican	Lewis C. Carpenter	15,553	42.0	−14.1
Majority		5,926	16.0	+3.8
Turnout		37,032		
Democratic gain from Republican				

== 4th congressional district ==
Incumbent Republican Congressman Alexander S. Wallace of the 4th congressional district, in office since 1870, was defeated by Democratic challenger John H. Evins.

=== General election results ===
South Carolina's 4th congressional district election results, 1876
Party	Candidate	Votes	%	±%
Democratic	John H. Evins	21,875	57.6	+10.8
Republican	Alexander S. Wallace (incumbent)	16,071	42.4	−10.8
Majority		5,804	15.2	+8.8
Turnout		37,946		
Democratic gain from Republican				

== 5th congressional district ==
Incumbent Republican Congressman Robert Smalls of the 5th congressional district, in office since 1875, defeated Democratic challenger George D. Tillman.

=== General election results ===
South Carolina's 5th congressional district election results, 1876
Party	Candidate	Votes	%	±%
Republican	Robert Smalls (incumbent)	19,954	51.9	−27.5
Democratic	George D. Tillman	18,516	48.1	+48.1
No party	Write-Ins	2	0.0	−0.7
Majority		1,438	3.8	−55.7
Turnout		38,472		
Republican hold				

== See also ==
- United States House of Representatives elections, 1876
- South Carolina gubernatorial election, 1876
- South Carolina's congressional districts
