= James H. Goss =

American politician (1820–1886)

James Hamilton Goss
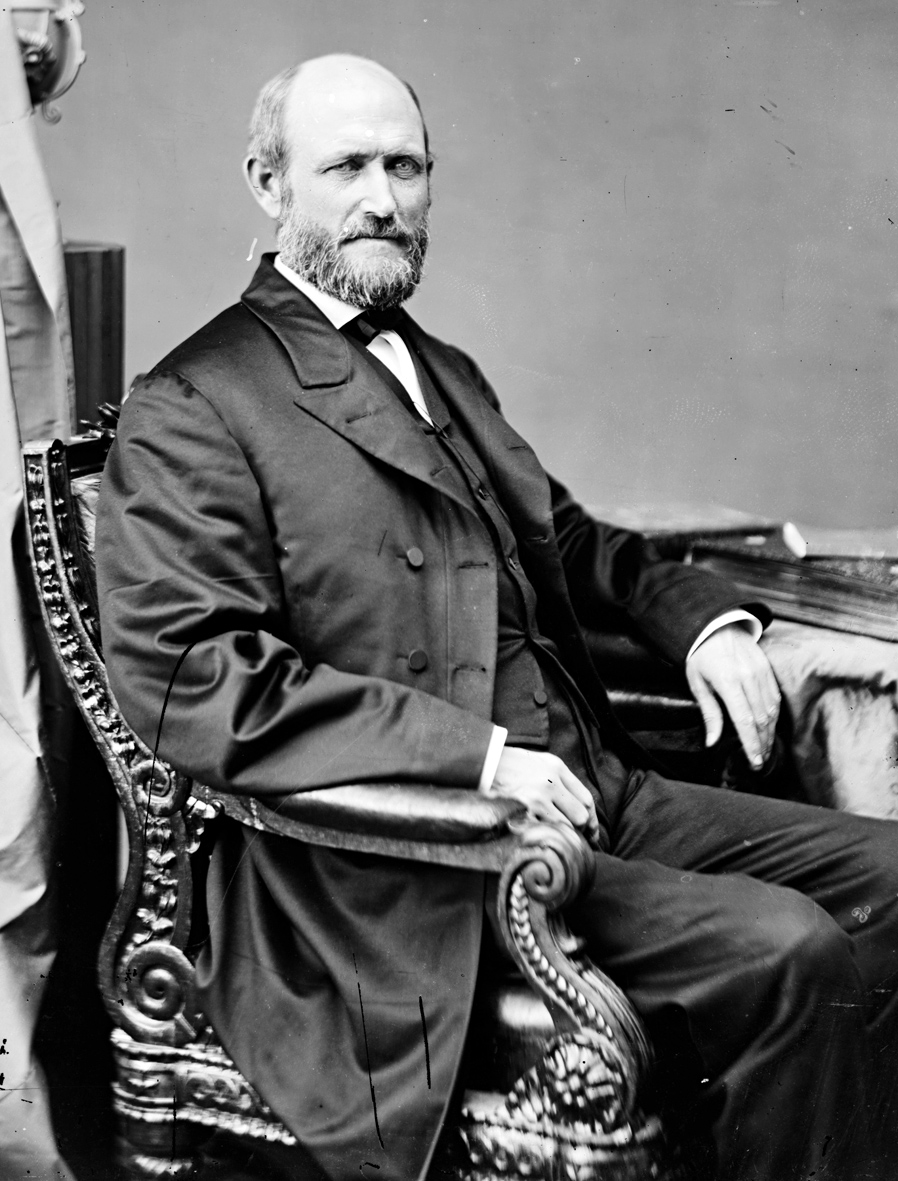

Member of the U.S. House of Representatives from South Carolina's 4th district
- In office July 18, 1868 – March 3, 1869
- Preceded by: Milledge L. Bonham (1860)
- Succeeded by: Alexander S. Wallace

Personal details
- Born: August 9, 1820 Union, South Carolina, U.S.
- Died: October 31, 1886 (aged 66) Union, South Carolina, U.S.
- Resting place: Union Presbyterian Cemetery
- Party: Republican

Military service
- Allegiance: Confederate States of America
- Branch/service: South Carolina Militia
- Battles/wars: American Civil War

James Hamilton Goss (August 9, 1820 – October 31, 1886) was a U.S. representative from South Carolina during the Reconstruction era.

Born in Union, South Carolina, Goss attended the common schools and the Union Male Academy. He engaged in mercantile pursuits. He served with the South Carolina Militia during the Civil War.

He served as delegate to the State constitutional convention in 1867. Upon the readmission of the State of South Carolina to representation, he was elected as a Republican to the 40th Congress and served from July 18, 1868, to March 3, 1869. He was not a candidate for renomination in 1868.

He served as member of the board of commissioners of Union County from 1871 to 1874. He was appointed postmaster of Union August 12, 1875, and served until September 23, 1884.

He died in Union, South Carolina, October 31, 1886. He was interred in the Presbyterian Cemetery.

== Sources ==
- United States Congress. "James H. Goss (id: G000335)". Biographical Directory of the United States Congress.

U.S. House of Representatives
Preceded by Milledge L. Bonham	Member of the U.S. House of Representatives from South Carolina's 4th congressional district 1868–1869	Succeeded by Alexander S. Wallace
