= Henry Elijah Alvord =

American educator and soldier (1844-1904)

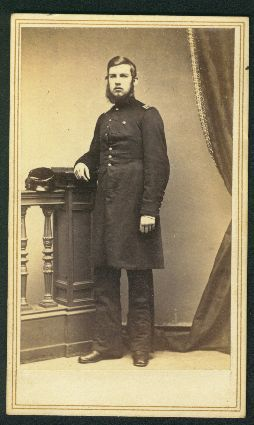
Henry Alvord while serving with the Second Massachusetts Cavalry

Henry Elijah Alvord (March 11, 1844 – October 1, 1904) was an American university administrator, educator, and Army officer. He served as the president of the Oklahoma Agricultural and Mechanical College (now Oklahoma State University) and the Maryland Agricultural College (now the University of Maryland) as well teaching Military Science at Massachusetts Agricultural College (Now the University of Massachusetts – Amherst).

Alvord was born on March 11, 1844, in Greenfield, Massachusetts. He was educated at Norwich University and was given the degrees of C.E. and B.S. in 1863. He joined the Union Army in 1862 as a private, eventually reaching the rank of Major in 1865 through meritorious service. He became interested in the emerging western cattle industry while serving as captain of the United States cavalry near the close of the American Civil War. Alvord later lobbied for the passage of the Hatch Act of 1887 and the Morrill Act of 1890, which helped establish agricultural experiment stations. In 1872, he was appointed a special Indian courier. He served as Professor of Agriculture of the Massachusetts Agricultural College from 1886 to 1887, as well as the second president of Oklahoma Agricultural and Mechanical College from 1894 to 1895. He organized and became chief of the dairy division of the bureau of animal industry of the U.S. department of agriculture in 1895. He died on October 1, 1904, in St. Louis, Missouri while attending the World's Fair.
