= Roderick Rose =

American judge

Roderick Rose (May 15, 1838 in Smiths Falls, Upper Canada – September 10, 1903 in Jamestown, North Dakota) was a British North America-born American educator, lawyer, politician, and judge.

Rose's family moved to the small city of Woodstock, Canada West, where he was educated. In 1858 he moved to Iowa, serving as a school principal in Montezuma and Davenport for twelve years. He studied for the bar, was admitted in 1871, and set up a practice in Davenport. He also served 3 terms as mayor (1875-6, 1880). In 1880 he was the Democratic Party candidate for U.S. Representative in Iowa's 2nd district, losing to Republican nominee Sewall S. Farwell. In 1882 he moved to Jamestown, in what was then the Dakota Territory, and helped draft the city's charter when it was incorporated in 1883. He served as city attorney and also two terms as mayor.

He was appointed to the district court and then to the Supreme Court of the Dakota Territory shortly before statehood. After North Dakota statehood in 1889 he was twice elected to the 5th District court. Finally, he was elected in 1900 and 1902 to serve as state's attorney in Stutsman County.

Rose was active in a fraternal order, the Ancient Order of United Workmen, serving as the national Supreme Workman in 1880.

== Family ==
Rose married Annie Ferneau (1844-1920) on June 2, 1864 in Iowa; they had two children who survived him, Edwin (1867-1904) and Nellie (1870-1926).
