= Samuel F. Coleman =

American politician

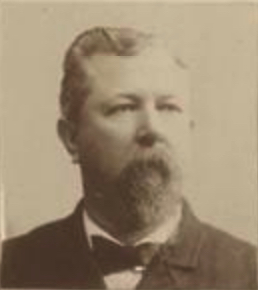

Member of the Virginia House of Delegates for Buckingham and Cumberland
- In office December 4, 1889 – December 6, 1893

Personal details
- Born: Samuel Francis Coleman; September 4, 1842 Cumberland, Virginia, U.S.
- Died: May 1, 1898 (aged 55) Buckingham, Virginia, U.S.
- Party: Democratic

Military service
- Allegiance: Confederate States
- Branch/service: Confederate States Army
- Rank: Sergeant
- Unit: 3rd Virginia Cavalry
- Battles/wars: American Civil War

Samuel Francis Coleman (September 4, 1842 – May 1, 1898) was an American politician who served in the Virginia House of Delegates.
