= John Bratton =

American politician

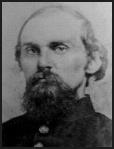
- John Bratton

Member of the U.S. House of Representatives from South Carolina's 4th district
- In office December 8, 1884 – March 3, 1885
- Preceded by: John H. Evins
- Succeeded by: William H. Perry

21st Comptroller General of South Carolina
- In office November 30, 1880 – December 1, 1882
- Governor: Johnson Hagood
- Preceded by: John C. Coit
- Succeeded by: William E. Stoney

Member of the South Carolina Senate from Fairfield County
- In office November 27, 1865 – September 21, 1866
- Succeeded by: James Mars Rutland

Personal details
- Born: March 7, 1831 Winnsboro, South Carolina, U.S.
- Died: January 12, 1898 (aged 66) Winnsboro, South Carolina, U.S.
- Resting place: St. John's Episcopal Church Cemetery
- Party: Democratic
- Education: South Carolina College; South Carolina Medical College
- Profession: soldier, planter, doctor
- Nickname: [Old] Reliable

Military service
- Allegiance: Confederate States of America
- Branch/service: Confederate States Army
- Years of service: 1861–65
- Rank: Brigadier General
- Commands: 6th South Carolina Infantry; Bratton's Brigade
- Battles/wars: American Civil War: Peninsula Campaign; Battle of Seven Pines; Battle of Fredericksburg; Siege of Suffolk; Chattanooga campaign; Knoxville Campaign; Overland Campaign; Siege of Petersburg; Appomattox Campaign

John Bratton (March 7, 1831 – January 12, 1898) was a U.S. representative from South Carolina, as well as a general in the Confederate States Army during the American Civil War. He rose from private to brigadier general and led a regiment and brigade in the Army of Northern Virginia in several important battles in both the Eastern Theater and Western Theater during the war.

== Early life and career ==
Bratton was born in Winnsboro, South Carolina. He attended the Academy of Mount Zion Institute in Winnsboro and graduated from South Carolina College at Columbia in 1850 and from South Carolina Medical College at Charleston in 1853. While at South Carolina College, he was a member of the Euphradian Society. He practiced medicine in Winnsboro from 1853 to 1861. Bratton was also a successful planter, acquiring high valued real-estate and as many as seventy-five slaves by 1860.

== Civil War service ==
John Bratton was one of only a few men who enlisted in the Confederate Army as a private, rose to the rank of brigadier general, and fought in both Eastern and Western theaters during the Civil War.

He enlisted in the Confederate States Army on April 1, 1861, as a private in Company C of the 6th South Carolina Infantry and was promoted a month later to captain. On March 1, 1862, he became a colonel in charge of the regiment. He participated in the Peninsula Campaign and was wounded and captured in the Battle of Seven Pines.

On June 1, 1862, under the command of Maj. Gen. James Longstreet and Brig. Gen. Richard H. Anderson, Bratton led the 6th South Carolina Regiment in an assault on several isolated Union entrenchments west of Seven Pines, Virginia. Bratton's 6th Regiment was the lead Confederate regiment in the Confederate advance through and behind enemy lines. During the assault Bratton sustained a severe injury to his left arm and shoulder. Unable to make it back to Confederate lines on his own, he was being assisted by another wounded soldier from his regiment but was subsequently captured by Union forces when he accidentally stumbled into their lines. Upon hearing word of the 6th Regiment's gallantry, Union Brig. Gen. Philip Kearny saw to it that Bratton received the utmost care. Bratton was released two months later on August 31, 1862.

Bratton rejoined his regiment in October 1862 and participated in the Battle of Fredericksburg in December. In the spring of 1863, his regiment missed the Battle of Chancellorsville because it accompanied Longstreet's Corps in the Siege of Suffolk, where Bratton served as temporary brigade commander. The regiment garrisoned Richmond, Virginia, while Robert E. Lee's army fought the Gettysburg campaign during June and July. In the fall of 1863, Col. Bratton's 6th South Carolina accompanied Gen. Longstreet's corps to the Western Theater. He was present in several battles in the Tennessee area, including the Chattanooga campaign and the Knoxville Campaign.

Bratton's regiment did not reach the Army of Tennessee until after the Battle of Chickamauga. Brig. Gen. Micah Jenkins replaced Maj. Gen. John Bell Hood after he was wounded at Chickamauga and Bratton once again served as brigade commander. Bratton led a night attack on Federal forces at Wauhatchie on October 28–29, 1863, during which Bratton had the 1st, 2nd, 5th, and 6th South Carolina Regiments and Hampton's legion at his disposal. Opposing him were the 109th and 111th Pennsylvania Regiments along with the 137th and 149th New York Regiments. Although the brigade attack was well-executed, the battle was a significant Confederate defeat at the beginning of the Chattanooga Campaign.

Bratton was promoted to brigadier general dating from May 6, 1864. He led an infantry brigade in the Army of Northern Virginia for most of the rest of the war, seeing action in such battles as the Wilderness, Spotsylvania Court House, and Cold Harbor. He then participated in the defense of Petersburg and was wounded in the shoulder at the Battle of Darbytown Road.

He surrendered his brigade, the largest in the Army of Northern Virginia at the end of the war, at Appomattox Court House in April 1865 and was paroled on April 9.

== Postbellum career ==
In the years following the war, Bratton concentrated on farming cotton and raising imported livestock. He entered politics during Reconstruction as a supporter of the conservative Democratic regime dominated by Gen. Wade Hampton.

Bratton served as member of the State constitutional convention in 1865. He represented Fairfield in the South Carolina Senate in 1866. He served as chairman of the South Carolina delegation in the 1876 Democratic National Convention. He served as delegate to the Democratic National Convention in 1880. Bratton was elected comptroller general of South Carolina by the legislature, to fill a vacancy, in 1881. Bratton was elected to the Forty-eighth Congress to fill the vacancy caused by the death of John H. Evins and served from December 8, 1884, to March 3, 1885. He was not a candidate for renomination in 1884.

He retired from active politics and again engaged in planting at "Farmington" near Winnsboro. He died in Winnsboro, South Carolina. He was interred in St. John's Episcopal Church Cemetery.

== Honors ==
The General John Bratton Camp #1816 of the Sons of Confederate Veterans was named in his honor.

== See also ==
- List of American Civil War generals (Confederate)

== Notes ==
U.S. House of Representatives
Preceded by John H. Evins	Member of the U.S. House of Representatives from South Carolina's 4th congressional district 1884 – 1885	Succeeded by William H. Perry
