= Alexander S. Wallace =

American politician (1810–1893)

Alexander Stuart Wallace
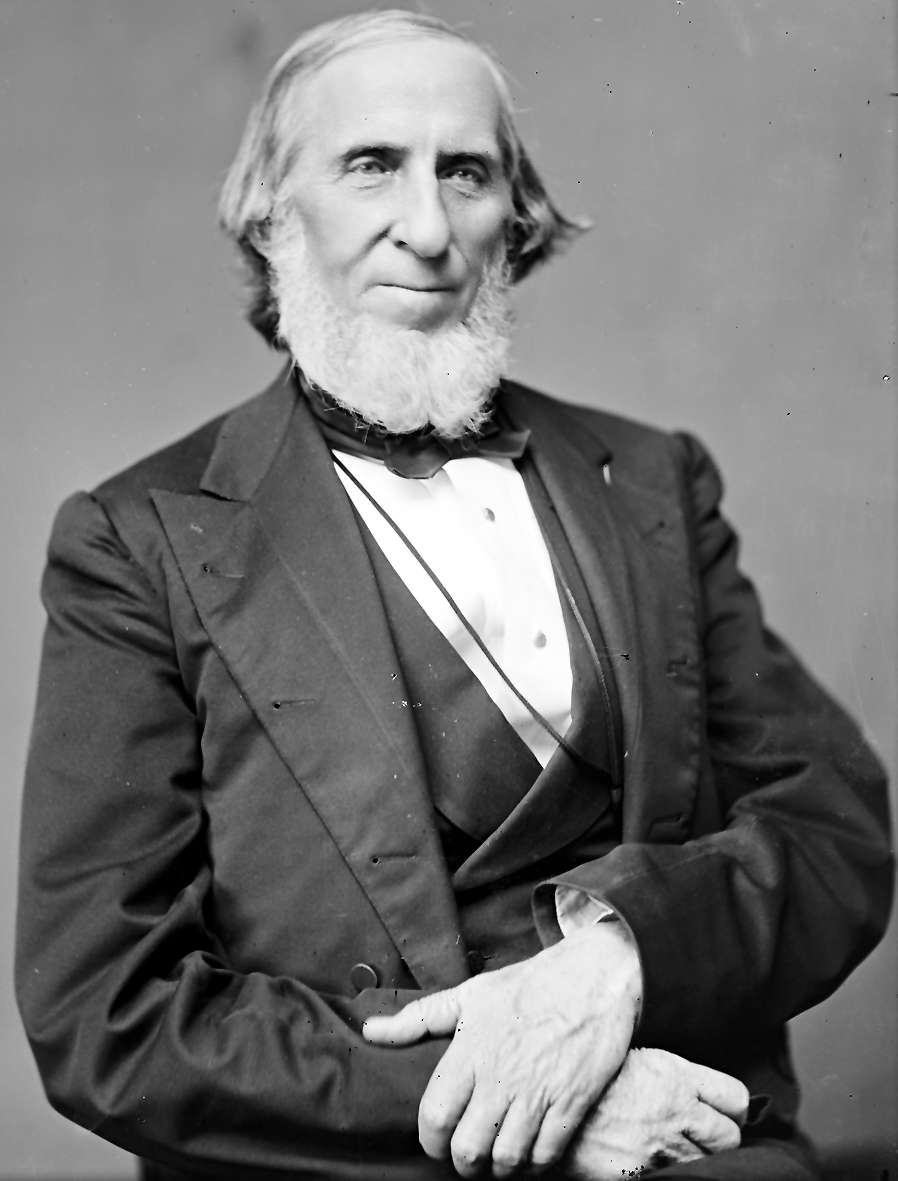

Member of the U.S. House of Representatives from South Carolina's 4th district
- In office May 27, 1870 – March 3, 1877
- Preceded by: James H. Goss
- Succeeded by: John H. Evins

Member of the South Carolina House of Representatives from York District
- In office November 27, 1865 – August 5, 1866
- In office November 22, 1858 – December 22, 1859
- In office November 22, 1852 – December 19, 1855

Personal details
- Born: December 30, 1810 York, South Carolina, U.S.
- Died: June 27, 1893 (aged 82) York, South Carolina, U.S.
- Resting place: Rose Hill Cemetery
- Party: Republican

Alexander Stuart Wallace (December 30, 1810 – June 27, 1893) was a United States representative from South Carolina.

The son of American colonial immigrant McCasland Wallace (born at sea on the Atlantic Ocean to a Scots-Irish family on their way to the port of Charleston, South Carolina), Wallace was born near York, South Carolina and received limited schooling. Wallace was a slaveholder and engaged in planting in his native county.

== Life ==
Wallace served as member of the South Carolina House of Representatives from 1852 to 1855, and from 1858 to 1859 under the Unionist banner. When South Carolina seceded from the Union, he withdrew from politics. Wallace quietly refrained from supporting the Confederacy in any way during the war years, though this was a situation he had to navigate carefully, as his earlier Unionist sympathies made him a target. After the war he immediately joined the Republican Party. He successfully contested as a Republican the election of William D. Simpson to the 41st Congress. South Carolina's 1868 Constitution barred ex-confederates from voting but did give the franchise to newly freed African-Americans. As a result, most people eligible to vote in the next several elections were African-Americans, northern military officers who had stayed in South Carolina after the war, and whites who worked for the Freedmen's Bureau, all of whom overwhelmingly supported the Republican Party. Under these circumstances Wallace was reelected to the 42nd, 43rd, and 44th and served from May 27, 1870, to March 3, 1877. He served as chairman of the Committee on Revolutionary Claims (42nd Congress). He was an unsuccessful candidate for reelection in 1876 to the 45th Congress. While in Congress, Wallace voted for the Ku Klux Klan Act and the Civil Rights Act of 1875. After serving in Congress, he engaged in agricultural pursuits until his death near York, South Carolina, June 27, 1893.

He was interred at Rose Hill Cemetery in York.

== Sources ==
- United States Congress. "Alexander S. Wallace (id: W000074)". Biographical Directory of the United States Congress.

U.S. House of Representatives
Preceded by James H. Goss	Member of the U.S. House of Representatives from South Carolina's 4th congressional district 1870–1877	Succeeded by John H. Evins
