= John S. Richardson =

American politician

John Smythe Richardson
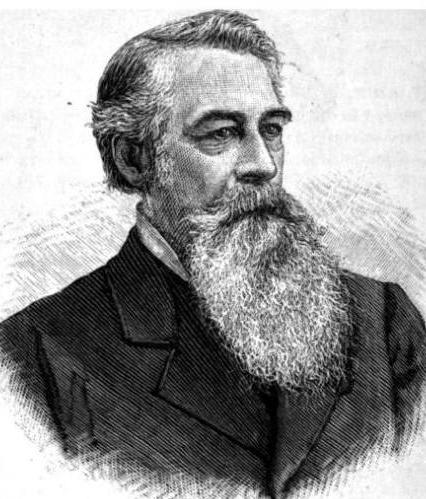

Member of the U.S. House of Representatives from South Carolina's 1st district
- In office March 4, 1879 – March 3, 1883
- Preceded by: Joseph H. Rainey
- Succeeded by: Samuel Dibble

Member of the South Carolina House of Representatives from Sumter County
- In office November 27, 1865 – December 21, 1866

Personal details
- Born: February 29, 1828 Sumter, South Carolina
- Died: February 24, 1894 (aged 65) Sumter, South Carolina
- Resting place: Sumter, South Carolina
- Party: Democratic
- Education: South Carolina College
- Profession: Lawyer

Military service
- Allegiance: Confederate States of America
- Branch/service: Confederate States Army
- Years of service: 1861–1865
- Rank: Captain
- Battles/wars: American Civil War

John Smythe Richardson (February 29, 1828 – February 24, 1894) was a U.S. Representative from South Carolina.

Born on the Bloomhill plantation, near Sumter, South Carolina, Richardson pursued an academic course in Cokesbury, South Carolina, and was studied law at the South Carolina College (now the University of South Carolina) at Columbia, graduating in 1850. He was admitted to the bar in 1852 and began practice in Sumter, South Carolina.

During the Civil War, he entered the Confederate States Army as a captain of Infantry. He was later promoted to adjutant of the Twenty-third Regiment, South Carolina Infantry, and served until the close of the war in 1865. He served as member of the South Carolina House of Representatives in 1865–1867. He was appointed an agent of the State of South Carolina in 1866 to apply for and receive the land script donated to South Carolina by Congress. He served as delegate to the 1876 Democratic National Convention.

Richardson was elected as a Democrat to the Forty-sixth and Forty-seventh Congresses (March 4, 1879 – March 3, 1883). He served as master in equity for Sumter County in 1884–1893. He died at his country home, "Shadyside," near Sumter, South Carolina, on February 24, 1894. He was interred in Sumter Cemetery.

== Sources ==
- United States Congress. "John S. Richardson (id: R000225)". Biographical Directory of the United States Congress.

U.S. House of Representatives
Preceded by Joseph H. Rainey	Member of the U.S. House of Representatives from South Carolina's 1st congressional district 1879–1883	Succeeded by Samuel Dibble
