= John H. Evins =

American politician

John Hamilton Evins
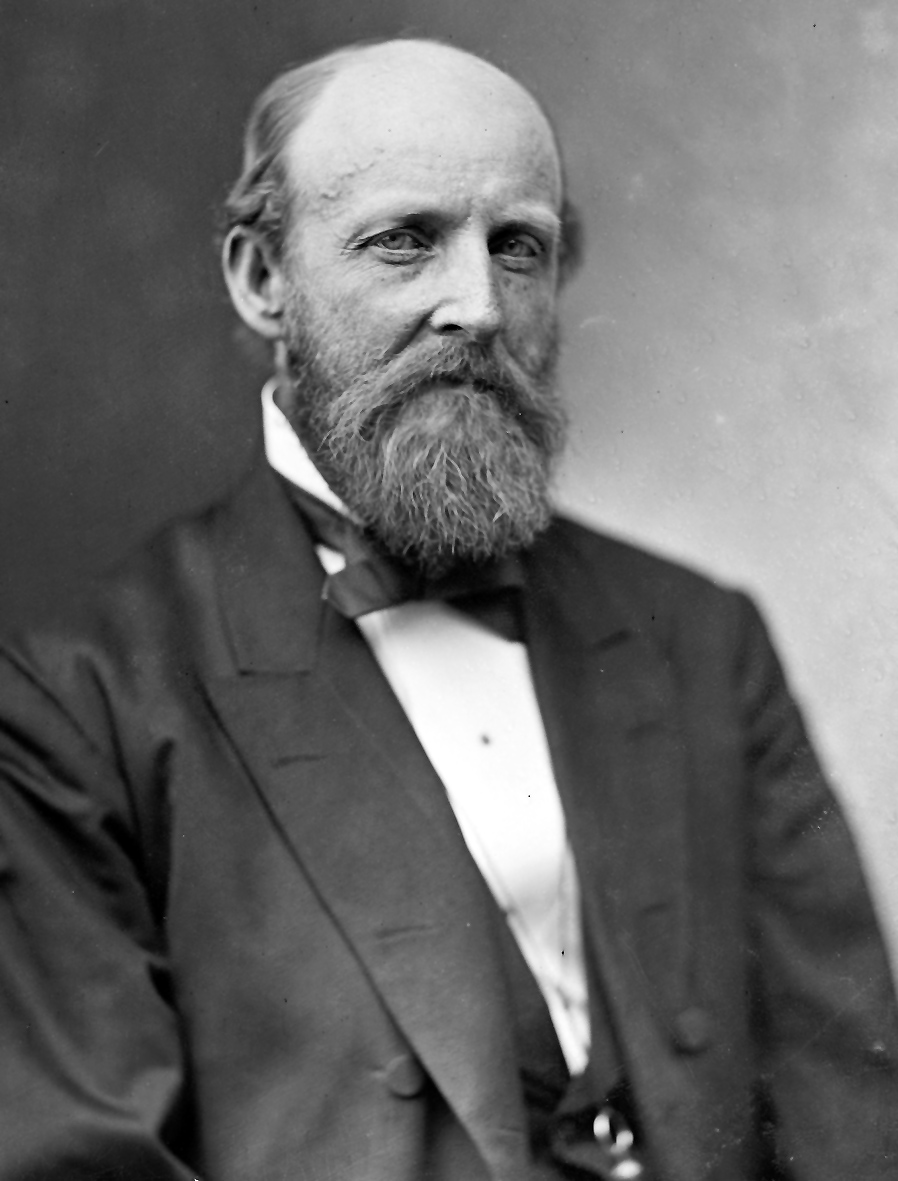

Member of the U.S. House of Representatives from South Carolina's 4th district
- In office March 4, 1877 – October 20, 1884
- Preceded by: Alexander S. Wallace
- Succeeded by: John Bratton

Member of the South Carolina House of Representatives from Spartanburg District
- In office November 24, 1862 – December 23, 1864

Personal details
- Born: July 18, 1830 Spartanburg District, South Carolina
- Died: October 20, 1884 (aged 54) Spartanburg, South Carolina
- Resting place: Spartanburg
- Party: Democratic

Military service
- Allegiance: Confederate States of America
- Branch/service: Confederate States Army
- Years of service: 1861 – 1865
- Rank: Captain
- Battles/wars: American Civil War

John Hamilton Evins (July 18, 1830 – October 20, 1884) was a U.S. representative from South Carolina.

Born in Spartanburg District, South Carolina, Evins attended the common schools and graduated from South Carolina College at Columbia in 1853. He studied law.

He was admitted to the bar in 1856 and commenced practice in Spartanburg, South Carolina. He entered the Confederate States Army as a lieutenant and served until the close of the Civil War, attaining the rank of captain. He resumed the practice of law in Spartanburg. He served as member of the State house of representatives from 1862 to 1864. He served as delegate to the Democratic National Convention in 1876.

Evins was elected as a Democrat to the Forty-fifth and to the three succeeding Congresses and served from March 4, 1877, until his death in Spartanburg, South Carolina, October 20, 1884. He served as chairman of the Committee on Territories (Forty-eighth Congress). He was interred in Magnolia Street Cemetery.

== See also ==
- List of members of the United States Congress who died in office (1790–1899)

== Sources ==
- United States Congress. "John H. Evins (id: E000272)". Biographical Directory of the United States Congress.

U.S. House of Representatives
Preceded by Alexander S. Wallace	Member of the U.S. House of Representatives from South Carolina's 4th congressional district 1877 – 1884	Succeeded by John Bratton
