= D. Wyatt Aiken =

American politician

David Wyatt Aiken
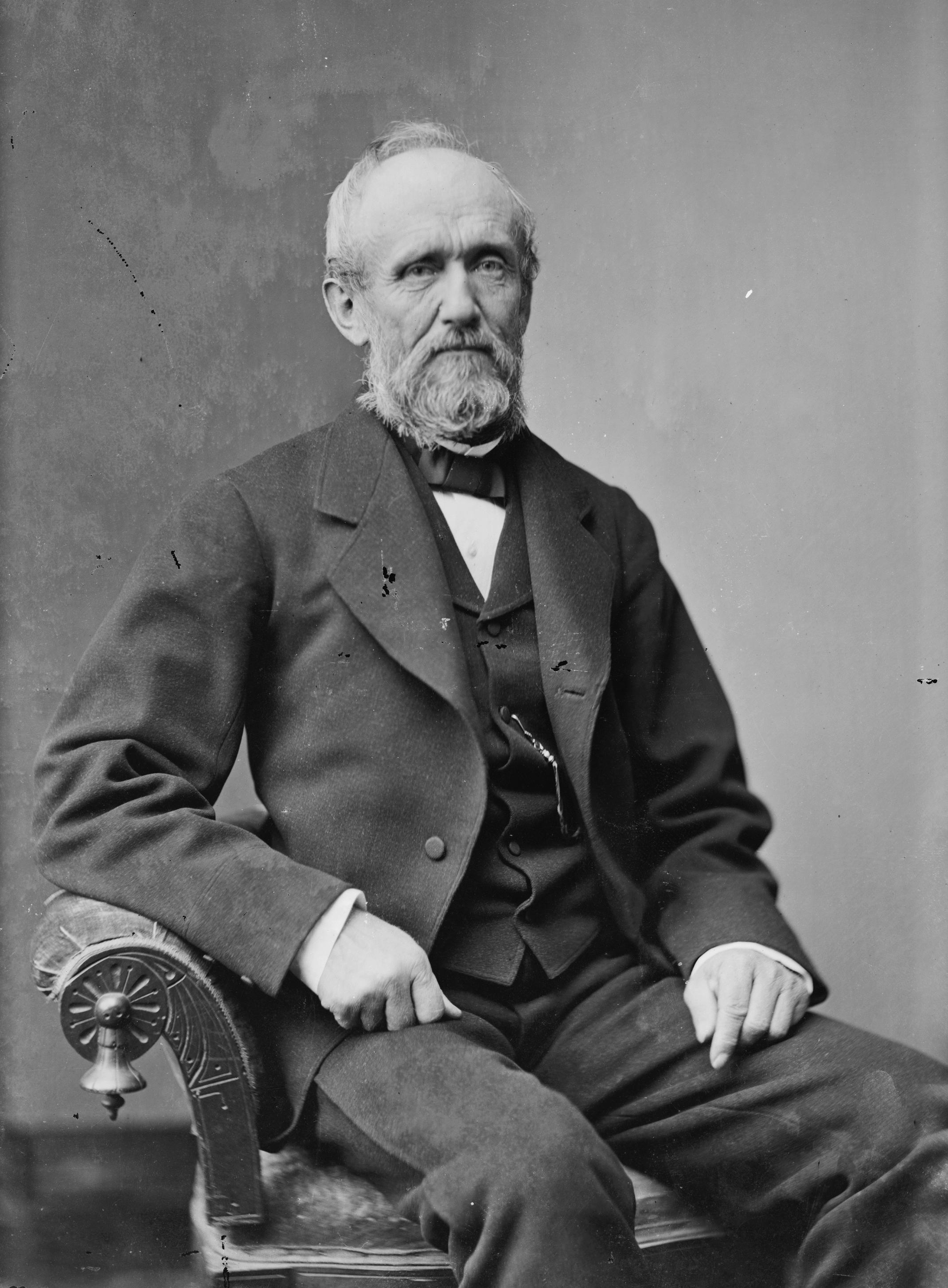

Member of the U.S. House of Representatives from South Carolina's 3rd district
- In office March 4, 1877 – March 3, 1887
- Preceded by: Solomon L. Hoge
- Succeeded by: James S. Cothran

Member of the South Carolina House of Representatives from Abbeville District
- In office November 28, 1864 – December 21, 1866

Personal details
- Born: March 17, 1828 Winnsboro, South Carolina, US
- Died: April 6, 1887 (aged 59) Cokesbury, South Carolina, US
- Party: Democratic
- Profession: journalist, farmer

Military service
- Allegiance: Confederate States of America
- Branch/service: Confederate States Army
- Years of service: 1861–64
- Rank: Colonel
- Commands: 7th South Carolina Infantry
- Battles/wars: American Civil War: Peninsula Campaign; Northern Virginia Campaign; Battle of Antietam; Gettysburg Campaign

David Wyatt Aiken (March 17, 1828 – April 6, 1887) was a , Confederate army officer during the American Civil War and a reconstruction era five-term United States Congressman from South Carolina.

== Biography ==
=== Early life ===
Aiken was born in Winnsboro, South Carolina, and received his early education under private tutors. He attended the Mount Zion Institute in Winnsboro and graduated from South Carolina College in Columbia in 1849. He taught college for two years before marrying Mattie Gaillard in 1852 and engaging in agricultural pursuits, owning a plantation and traveling extensively in Europe and throughout the United States, where he spoke in defense of slavery to large crowds. He became the editor of the Winnsboro News and Herald, and was married a second time to Miss Smith of Abbeville, where Aiken settled and continued to farm. In 1855, Aiken became a founding member of the State Agricultural Society.

He was a slave owner, and owned the Smith family slave plantation after marrying Smith, which held about 40 slaves.

=== Civil War, Reconstruction ===
In 1858 Aiken attended a political convention in Mobile, Alabama, and began speaking publicly in favor of secession. With South Carolina's secession and the advent of the Civil War, Aiken enlisted in the Confederate Army as a private in the 7th South Carolina Infantry. He was later appointed adjutant of the regiment and in 1862 was elected its colonel. He led it in the Peninsula and Northern Virginia Campaigns. He was severely wounded by a shot through his lungs at the Battle of Antietam in September 1862. After his lengthy recovery, he commanded his regiment in the Gettysburg Campaign in Joseph B. Kershaw's brigade, seeing action near the Peach Orchard in the Battle of Gettysburg. However, lingering effects of his wound soon forced Aiken to administrative duty in Macon, Georgia for a year, before he resigned from the Confederate army in mid-1864 and returned home.

He was a member of the State house of representatives from 1864–66 and served as secretary and treasurer of the State Agricultural and Mechanical Society of South Carolina in 1869. Aiken was a prominent figure in the Reconstruction-era Democratic party, and a leader in efforts to suppress the voting rights of recently emancipated slaves, and an advocate of "white man's government." He publicly called for the assassination of a black state legislator, Benjamin F. Randolph, saying “never to suffer this man Randolph to come into your midst; if he does, give him four feet by six.” On October 16, 1868, Randolph was assassinated by three men in broad daylight. Aiken was detained by state authorities on suspicion of being an accessory-before-the-fact, and freed on $5,000 bond. No one was ever brought to trial for Randolph's assassination.

=== Grange activist, magazine publisher ===
In 1872, Aiken was an activist on behalf of The National Grange of the Order of Patrons of Husbandry, more commonly known as the Grange, organizing 76 local chapters across South Carolina. Aiken was a member of the executive committee of the National Grange from 1873–85, served as its chairman in 1875, and was president of the South Carolina Grange from 1875–1877. Starting in 1869, Aiken was a correspondent of The Rural Carolinian, a magazine for southern planters and farmers. He eventually became editor and owner and held those positions until 1877.

=== Congressional service, death ===
Aiken served as a delegate to the Democratic National Convention at St. Louis in 1876, and was elected as a Democrat to the Forty-fifth and to the four succeeding Congresses (serving from 1877 until 1887). He was chairman of the Committee on Education in the Forty-eighth and Forty-ninth Congresses. With his health declining, Aiken became an invalid during his last term in office and was not a candidate for renomination in 1886.

Aiken died in Cokesbury, South Carolina.

His son, Wyatt Aiken, also served in Congress and a first cousin, William Aiken, Jr., became a Congressman and Governor of South Carolina.

U.S. House of Representatives
Preceded by Solomon L. Hoge	Member of the U.S. House of Representatives from South Carolina's 3rd congressional district 1877–1887	Succeeded by James S. Cothran
