= Ellenton massacre =

1876 U.S. racial confrontation

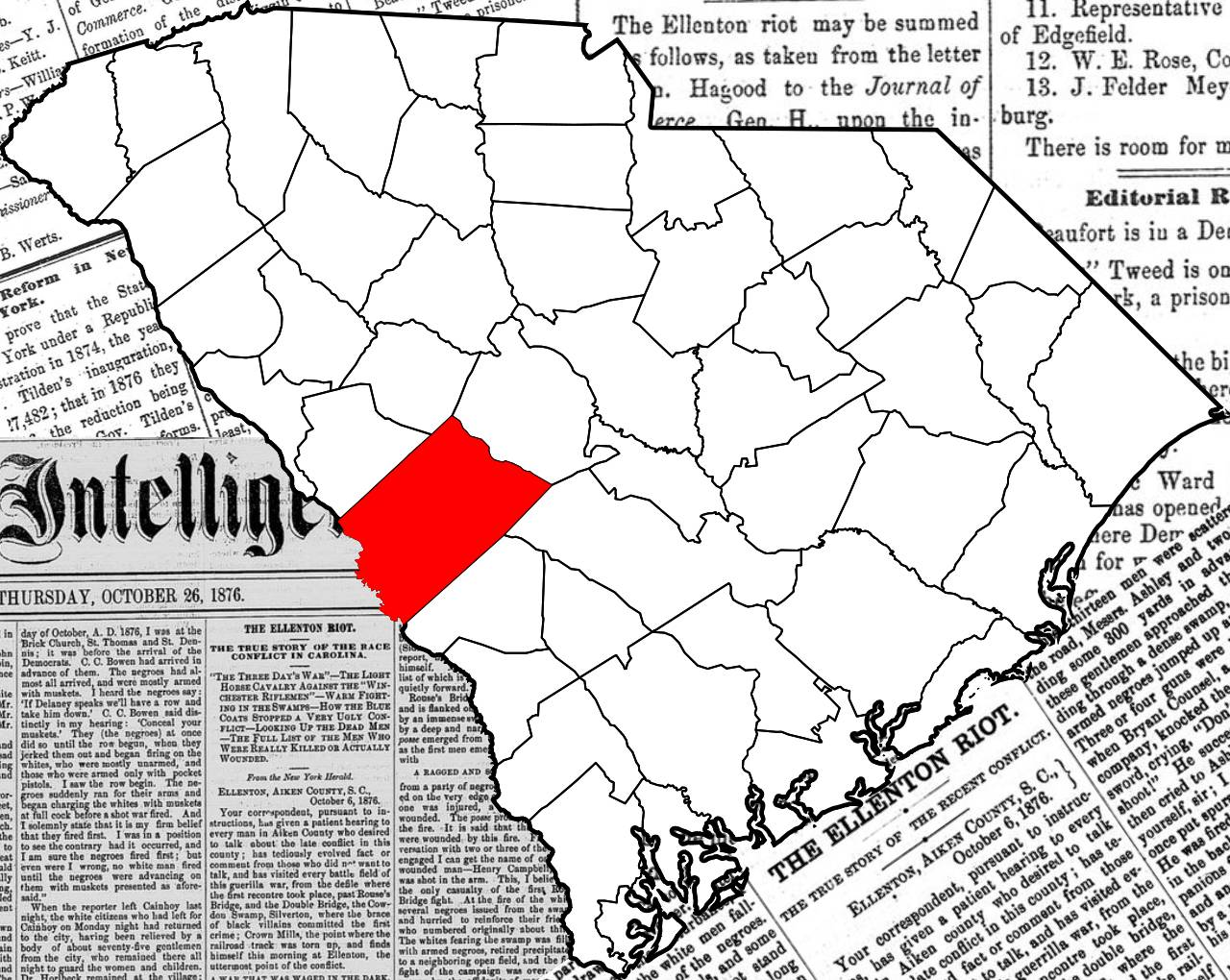
- 1876 News Coverage of the Ellenton Riot in Aiken County, South Carolina
- Date: September 1876
- Location: Aiken County, South Carolina
- Deaths: 25 to 100 African Americans, 1 white

The Ellenton massacre occurred in September 1876 and took place in South Carolina in the United States. The massacre was preceded by a series of civil disturbances earlier that year following tensions between the Democratic Party and the Republicans. Author Mark M. Smith concluded that there was one white and up to 100 blacks killed, with several white people wounded, while John S. Reynolds and Alfred B. Williams cite much lower numbers.

== Background ==
Aiken County, South Carolina was established in 1871, during the Reconstruction era. In 1875 its population of white, adult males was 2,494 and that of black, adult males was about 1,000 more. In their drive to take back political and social power in the state, white Democrats used intimidation and outright violence in the following years to discourage freedmen from voting. During the election of 1876 at the end of Reconstruction, several armed conflicts took place in Aiken County and nearby areas of South Carolina prior to the election (Hamburg massacre). The Piedmont, with counties split narrowly between the races, broke out into violence, as had happened at previous elections. White paramilitary groups, related to the thousands of men in rifle clubs, formed chapters of Red Shirts and worked to disrupt black Republican organizing, voting, and other political activities.

== Massacre ==
In September 1876, disturbances started near the hamlet of Silverton, in Aiken County. On September 15, Mrs. Alonzo Harley said two black men tried to attack her while her husband was working in the fields, but she grabbed her gun and drove them away. White citizens tracked down a man, Peter Williams, who was taken to the Hartleys for identification. When he tried to get away he was shot, but when Mrs. Hartley saw him, she said he was not the man who attacked her. Williams died of his wounds about a week later. While the incident was initially portrayed as racially based, it was connected to several other violent political incidents in the weeks before the 1876 election, in which white paramilitary groups in support of Democrats tried to suppress black Republican voting.

A warrant was issued for the arrest of Fred Pope, supposedly Williams' accomplice. A posse of 14 white men was formed the next day. Pope was defended at Rouse's Bridge by armed black men, and the whites retreated. By September 18, it was reported that 500-600 white men from Augusta and Columbia County, Georgia, members of rifle clubs or paramilitary groups, had entered the area. They attacked part of the Port Royal Railroad tracks, tearing up a portion. The white mobs spread out and killed freedmen working in fields, or hunted down or on the street. The official record of Deputy US Marshalls indicated between 25 and 30 black men were killed. A New York Times reporter in an article stated as many as 100 blacks were killed in the conflicts, which extended to September 21, with several whites wounded. W. Robert Williams was the one Caucasian killed. Included in the dead was state representative Simon P. Coker who was shot in the head while praying for mercy.

At the trial of some black men in May 1877, numerous witnesses testified that the whites had repeatedly said "they intended to carry the election [of 1876] if they had to wade in blood up to their saddle girths." Other testimony said that many of the white men involved were from Georgia and had openly said they had come into South Carolina to try to win the election of Wade Hampton III. This incident has not received as much attention from historians as other events of this period, such as the Hamburg Massacre, which occurred in Aiken County in July, perhaps because of the confusion as to the events, the duration of the troubles, and the total casualties.

== Aftermath ==
For years there was much confusion about the dates and circumstances of the violence, and numbers of casualties varied widely. According to historian Mark Smith, tensions had been building for weeks and people had appealed to the governor to do something about the Democratic rifle clubs. Following the nomination of Democrat Wade Hampton III for governor, the number of rifle clubs in the state increased by 200 as Democrats organized in armed groups to try to control the election. Historians Woody and Simkins estimated that by late 1876, the rifle clubs had 14,935 members.

Smith compared different accounts, finding that the riot appeared to extend from September 15 to 21, and ranging over an area from Rouse's Bridge to the Port Royal Railroad tracks. By September 18, there were reports that 500–600 men from Columbia County, Georgia had crossed the Savannah River and were camping near Hamburg. Learning that they were tearing up the Port Royal Railroad tracks, the governor sent some forces to try to prevent damage to other parts of the track. A couple of days later violence had shifted to Midway, Barnwell County. In October Governor Daniel Henry Chamberlain, Hampton's predecessor, issued orders to disband the rifle clubs and asked President Ulysses S. Grant for some forces to help him with this. The political nature of the unrest was expressed by witnesses who told governor's aides that "The colored men are informed that their only safety from death or whipping lies in singing {sic} an agreement pledging themselves to vote the democratic ticket in the coming election."

By comparing different accounts, Smith concluded that deaths were one white and up to 100 blacks, with several whites wounded. More than one account noted that the whites tried to conceal how many blacks were killed. Rifle clubs from numerous Georgia and South Carolina towns were involved. The paramilitary groups used such attacks as part of a strategy of broad intimidation to suppress black voting in November.

== Bibliography ==
Notes

References

- The New York Times (May 1877). "The Southern Massacres: Trial of the Ellenton Rioters". The New York Times. New York, NY. ISSN 1553-8095. OCLC 1645522.
- Smith, Mark M. (April 1994). "'All Is Not Quiet in Our Hellish County': Facts, Fiction, Politics, and Race – The Ellenton Riot of 1876". South Carolina Historical Magazine. 95 (2): 142–155. ISSN 0038-3082. JSTOR 27570004.
- Rucker, Walter C.; Upton, James N. (2007). Encyclopedia of American Race Riots, Volume 2. Greenwood Publishing Group. ISBN 9780313333026. - Total pages: 930
