= Simon P. Coker =

South Carolina state legislator

Member of the South Carolina House of Representatives from Barnwell County
- In office November 24, 1874 – September 19, 1876

Personal details
- Born: c. 1847 Barnwell, South Carolina, U.S.
- Died: September 19, 1876 (aged 29) Ellenton, South Carolina, U.S.
- Party: Republican
- Spouse: Celia Roberson
- Children: 4
- Profession: Farmer, politician

Simon P. Coker (c. 1847 – September 19, 1876) was an American farmer who represented Barnwell County, South Carolina in the South Carolina House of Representatives from 1874 until his assassination in 1876.

== Early life ==
Coker was likely born into slavery c. 1847 in Bennett Springs Township, located in Barnwell County, South Carolina. At the time, a white Coker family owned a plantation with slaves in the area, which is likely where Simon P. Coker was born. At the time of the 1870 census, Coker was a 23 year old free man living in Bennett Springs with a wife, Celia Roberson, and three children. The family owned no land, and Coker identified as an employed farm laborer. In 1872 the couple had a fourth child.

== Career ==
In 1874, Coker was elected as a Republican to represent Barnwell County in the South Carolina House of Representatives. At the time, the South Carolina General Assembly was composed mostly of black Republicans, and Coker worked with notable figures like Robert Smalls and Robert B. Elliott.

The 1876 South Carolina gubernatorial election led to statewide civil disturbances, as white supremacist Democrats attempted to retake control of the state through fear and intimidation. These Democrats, called Redeemers, organized "rifle clubs" called Red Shirts to show their strength and prevent black citizens from voting. On September 15, a riot broke out between Red Shirts and black South Carolinians in Ellenton, South Carolina, and the Red Shirts began killing black citizens indiscriminately in what would come to be known as the Ellenton massacre.

After hearing the news, Coker took a train from Barnwell to Ellenton on September 19 in an attempt to quell the violence. His train was stopped by Red Shirts once arriving at the station, and Coker was forced out onto the station's platform. He was pushed to his knees and shot in the head while praying for mercy. Benjamin Tillman, who later became Governor of South Carolina, was present at the execution. Coker was one of between thirty and fifty Black Republicans executed that day.

== See also ==
- Redeemers
