= Hamburg massacre =

US incident of racial violence

Coordinates: 33.481°N 81.950°W

- Part of the Reconstruction Era
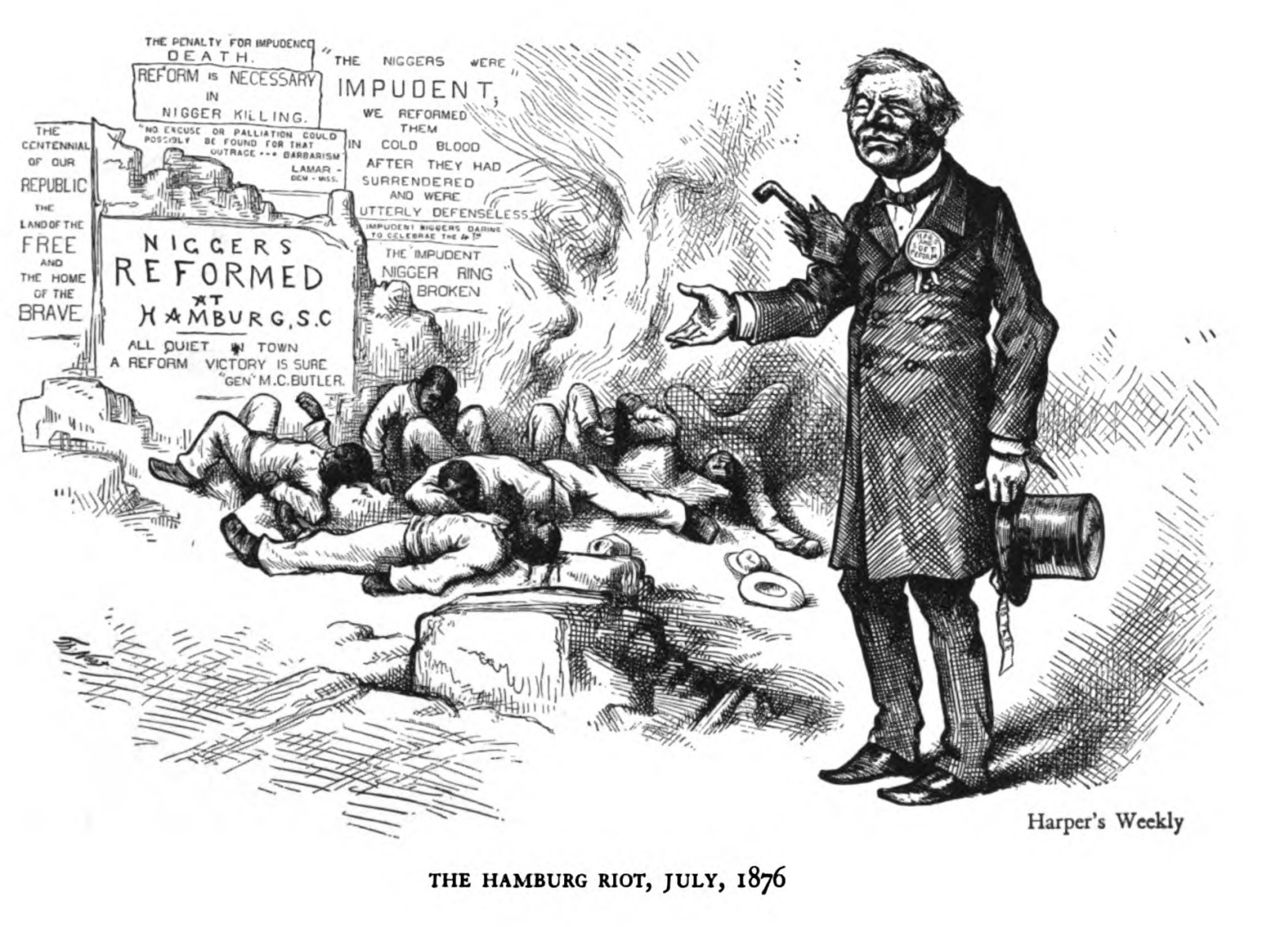
- Harper's Weekly cartoon decrying the Hamburg massacre
Date	July 1876
Location	Hamburg, South Carolina
Result	Political scandal and continued violence

Belligerents
White militia: Red Shirts; Planters; Local white supremacists; Democrats	United States: Court officials; South Carolina Army National Guard; Local African Americans; Republicans

Casualties and losses
1 dead	6 dead

The Hamburg massacre (or Red Shirt massacre or Hamburg riot) occurred in the United States town of Hamburg, South Carolina, in July 1876, leading up to the last election season of the Reconstruction era. It was the first of a series of civil disturbances planned and carried out by white Democrats in the majority-black Republican Edgefield District, with the goal of suppressing black Americans' civil rights and voting rights and disrupting Republican meetings, through actual and threatened violence.

Beginning with a dispute over free passage on a public road, the massacre was rooted in racial hatred and political motives. A court hearing attracted armed white "rifle clubs," colloquially called the "Red Shirts". Desiring to regain control of state governments and eradicate the civil rights of black Americans, over 100 white men attacked about 30 black servicemen of the National Guard at the armory, killing two as they tried to leave that night. Later that night, the Red Shirts tortured and murdered four of the militia while holding them as prisoners, and wounded several others. In total, the events in Hamburg resulted in the death of one white man and six black men with several more black people being wounded. Although 94 white men were indicted for murder by a coroner's jury, none were prosecuted.

The events were a catalyst in the overarching violence in the volatile 1876 election campaign. There were other episodes of violence in the months before the election, including an estimated 100 black people killed during several days in Ellenton, South Carolina, also in Aiken County. The Southern Democrats succeeded in "redeeming" the state government and electing Wade Hampton III as governor. During the remainder of the century, they passed laws to establish single-party white rule, impose legal segregation and "Jim Crow," and disenfranchise black people with a new state constitution adopted in 1895. This exclusion of black people from the political system was effectively maintained into the late 1960s.

== Background ==
Hamburg was a market town populated by a majority of freed black Americans in Aiken County, across the Savannah River from Augusta, Georgia. Aiken was the only county in the state to have been organized during the Reconstruction era. Following the end of the War, the defunct market town was repopulated by freedmen. (It had been made obsolete by the expansion of the South Carolina Railroad into Augusta.) Many black Americans in the postwar period moved from rural areas to cities to escape white violence and gain safety in their own communities.

As Democrats sought to regain control of the state legislature, their leaders planned to disrupt Republican events, as outlined in Confederate veteran General Martin W. Gary's "Plan of the Campaign of 1876" (also known as the Edgefield Plan). On July 4, 1876, Independence Day, two white planters drove in a carriage down Hamburg's wide Market Street, where they encountered a local militia company, which was drilling (or parading) under command of Captain D. L. "Doc" Adams.

== Events ==
The men in the Hamburg militia company were entirely black and mostly freedmen. A white supremacist group called the Red Shirts, led by Benjamin Tillman, who later went on serve a 24-year career in the United States Senate and whose term was marked by enacting segregationist legislation, instigated confrontations with the black citizens by claiming that said freedmen intentionally blocked passage of public roads and denied passage to any white man. Alternate sources say that a carriage of white men intentionally drove up against the head of the column to cause a civil disturbance. In any case, after an exchange of words, the Red Shirts, also called "white planters", passed through the ranks of the black parade.

The Red Shirts then went to the local court, where, at a hearing on July 6, they accused the militia with obstruction of a public road before Trial Justice Prince Rivers. The case was continued until the afternoon of July 8. More than 100 white people from Edgefield and Aiken counties arrived at court, armed with "shotguns, revolvers, hoes, axes and pitchforks." At that time, Matthew Calbraith Butler, an attorney from Edgefield, appeared as the planters' counsel. (Of the many men surnamed Butler who were involved in the incident, he was referred to as 'General' Butler, based on his service in the Confederate Army.) Despite the lack of any official standing, M. C. Butler demanded for the Hamburg company to disband and turn their guns over to him personally.

As armed white men gathered in the vicinity, the militia company refused to disarm and took refuge in the armory in the Sibley building near the Charlotte, Columbia and Augusta Railroad bridge. The white militia surrounded the building. Perhaps 25 black militia and 15 others were in the building when firing began. In the exchange of gunfire, McKie Meriwether, a local white farmer, was killed.

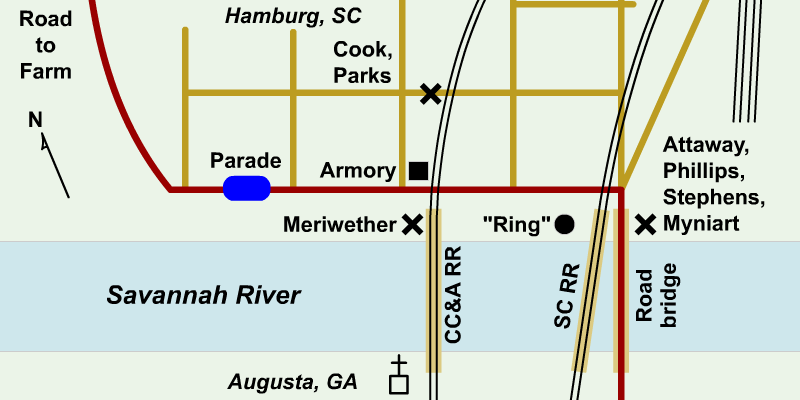
Map for the Hamburg massacre. From Budiansky, 231

Outnumbered, running out of ammunition, and upon learning that the white people had brought a small cannon to the city from Augusta, the militia in the armory slipped away into the night. James Cook, Hamburg's Town Marshal, was shot and killed in the street.

The white supremacist militia rounded up around two dozen black citizens, some from the militia, and at about 2 a.m, took them to a spot near the South Carolina Railroad and bridge. There, the white people formed what was later called the "Dead Ring" and debated the fate of the black men. The white people picked out four men and, going around the ring, murdered them one at a time; these men were as follows: Allan Attaway, David Phillips, Hampton Stephens, and Albert Myniart. The Sweetwater Sabre Company, led by Ben Tillman, was chosen to execute black state legislator Simon Coker of Barnwell. After being told of his impending execution, Coker asked the unit to give instructions to his wife regarding cotton-ginning and that month's rent. He was then executed mid-prayer.

Several others were wounded either during their escape or in a general fusillade as the ring broke up. According to the State Attorney General's report, freedman Moses Parks was also killed here; the US Senate investigation said he had been killed earlier near Cook.

A coroner's jury indicted ninety-four white men in the attack, including "M. C. Butler, Ben R. Tillman, A. P. Butler, and others of the most prominent men in Aiken and Edgefield Counties, South Carolina, and Richmond County, Georgia." They were never prosecuted.

The official report by the Attorney General of South Carolina ends with this statement:

... the facts show the demand on the militia to give up their arms was made by persons without lawful authority to enforce such demand or to receive the arms had they been surrendered; that the attack on the militia to compel a compliance with this demand was without lawful excuse or justification; and that after there had been some twenty or twenty-five prisoners captured and completely in the power of their captors, five of them were deliberately shot to death and three more severely wounded. It further appears that not content with thus satisfying their vengeance, many of the crowd added to their guilt the crime of robbery of defenceless people, and were only prevented from arson by the efforts of their own leaders. (Allen 1888, 317)

Outrage at the events led to the US Senate calling for an investigation. It gathered testimony in hearings held at Columbia, South Carolina, and published its findings in 1877.

== Reactions ==
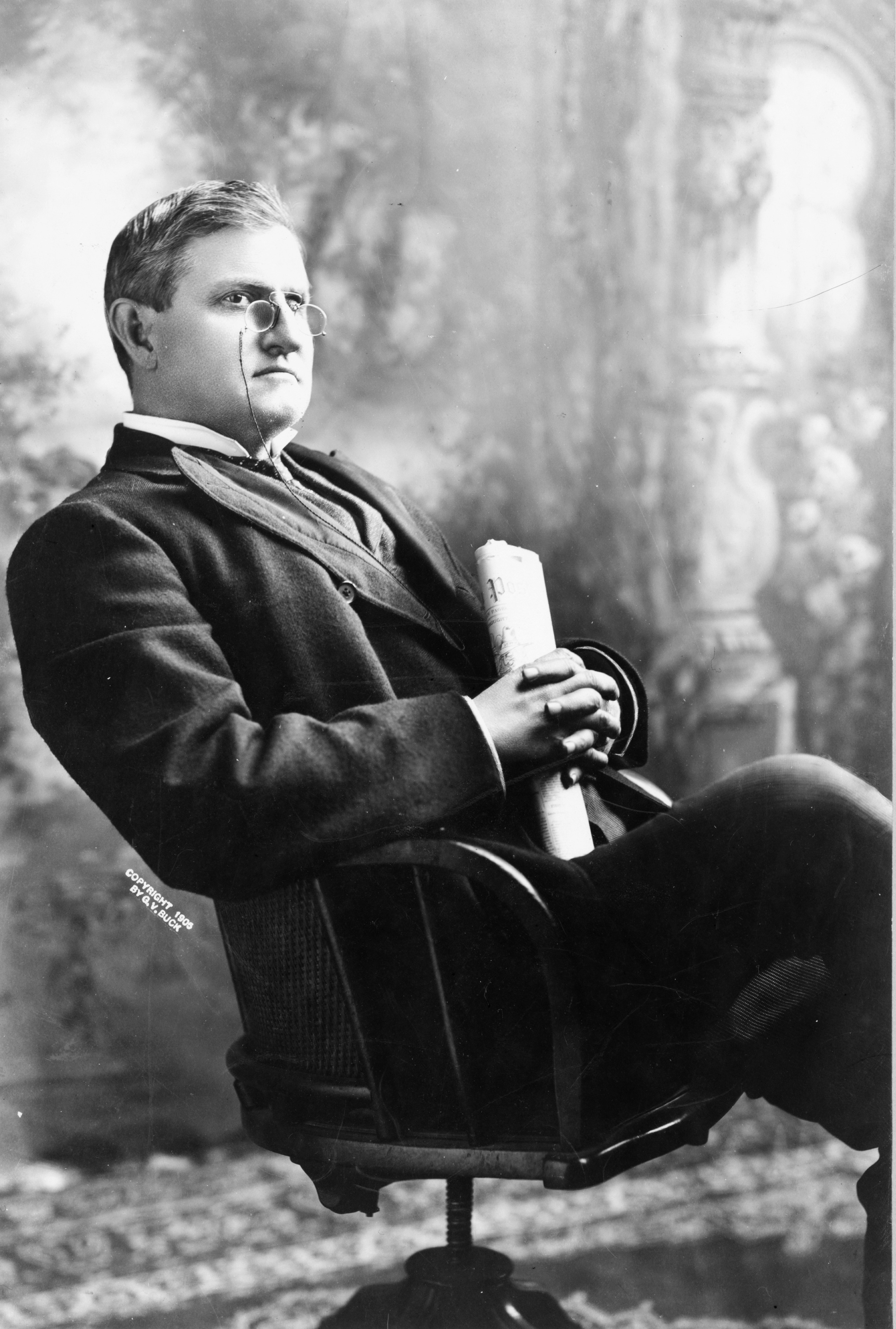
Benjamin Tillman

Republicans were stunned by the massacre at Hamburg. The event deflated the "Co-operationist" faction of the Democratic Party, which had anticipated a fusion with the reforming Republican Governor Daniel H. Chamberlain. Democratic support crystallized around the uncompromising "Straight-Outs," who had already launched the terrorist "Edgefield Plan" devised by General Martin W. Gary for South Carolina's Redemption.

The massacre attracted nationwide attention (such as in Harper's Weekly, August 12, 1876, and in The New York Times). A much larger massacre of freedmen by white paramilitary groups took place from September 15 to 21 in the town of Ellenton, also in Aiken County, with estimates of 100 freedmen killed and a few white people. In October 1876, there was a political conflict in Cainhoy, near Charleston, resulting in the deaths of one black man and three to six white men, the only such confrontation that year in South Carolina in which more white people died than black people.

Following the violent and bitterly contested 1876 election campaign, with suppression of black voting by actions of the Red Shirts and charges of fraud, white Democrats gained undivided control of the South Carolina legislature and narrowly won the Governor's office. They passed laws during the next two decades to impose legal segregation, Jim Crow, and, in 1895, adopted a new constitution, which effectively achieved black disenfranchisement in the state.

== Aftermath ==
=== Politics ===
M. C. Butler's expectations and extent of involvement in the later events have not been proven. He was not conclusively placed in the "Dead Ring", but his association with the massacre damaged his later career in the US Senate. However, during the 1894 Senatorial campaign, Butler faced Benjamin Ryan Tillman, who led an Edgefield County "Rifle Club," which was part of the Red Shirts, for the Democratic nomination. Tillman had been indicted by the coroner's jury for his involvement and had become recognized in the area for his role in the Hamburg Massacre. He continued to boast of the "stirring events" of 1876, referring to this more than a decade later during his 1890 campaign for governor of South Carolina. As he put it on the floor of the US Senate:

[A]s white men we are not sorry for it, and we do not propose to apologize for anything we have done in connection with it. We took the government away from them in 1876. We did take it. If no other Senator has come here previous to this time who would acknowledge it, more is the pity. We have had no fraud in our elections in South Carolina since 1884. There has been no organized Republican party in the State.

Butler and Tillman argued vehemently during the 1894 campaign about which of them had participated more in the Hamburg massacre. In South Carolina politics at that time, it was seen as heroic for a white man to have participated in the event. In 1940, the state legislature of South Carolina erected a statue honoring Tillman on the capital grounds. In 1946, Clemson University, one of South Carolina's public universities, renamed its main hall in Tillman's honor. Only after events in 2015, when a white supremacist named Dylann Roof murdered nine black church members during their prayer service, did Clemson vote to distance themselves from Tillman's "campaign of terror." In 2020, trustees of the university asked to rename the hall.

=== Fate of the town ===
After these events, many black people left Hamburg and it began to decline once more. After a 1911 flood, Augusta began construction of a river levee, but Hamburg was left unprotected. Disastrous floods in 1927 and following seasons finally forced out the last residents in 1929. In the 21st century, no visible remains exist of the former town of Hamburg, and it is largely covered by a golf course.

== See also ==
- List of massacres in South Carolina
- Freedmen massacres
- Hamburg, South Carolina slave market
