= 1878 South Carolina gubernatorial election =

- November 5, 1878
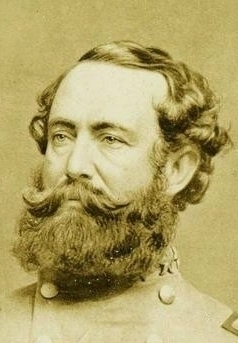
Nominee	Wade Hampton III
Party	Democratic
Popular vote	119,550
Percentage	99.82%
- County Results; Hampton: 90–100%
Governor before election
Wade Hampton III
Democratic
Elected Governor
Wade Hampton III
Democratic

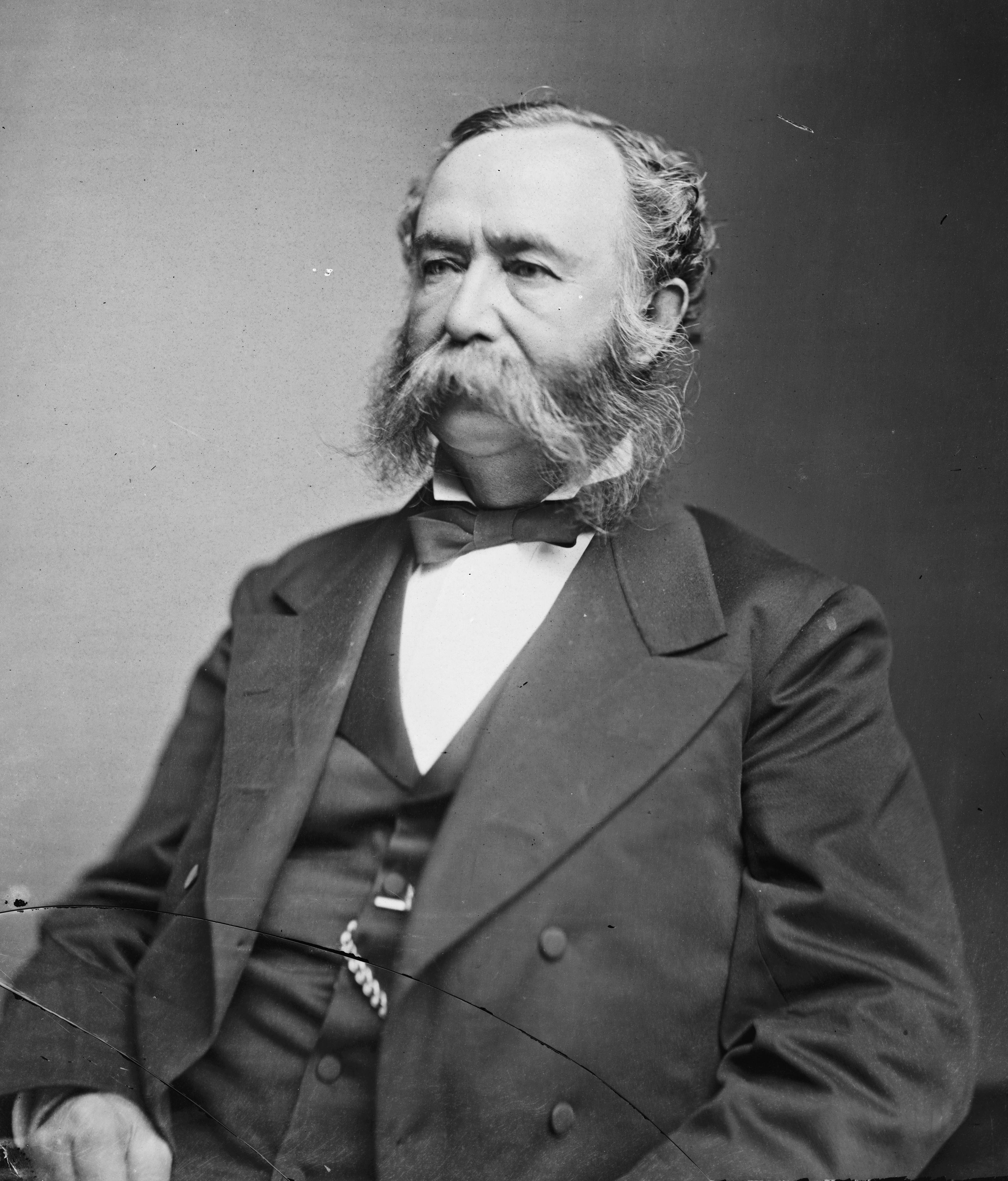
Wade Hampton III

The 1878 South Carolina gubernatorial election was held on November 5, 1878, to select the governor of South Carolina. Wade Hampton III was renominated by the Democrats and ran against no organized opposition in the general election to win reelection for a second two-year term.

== Campaign ==
Upon becoming governor after a prolonged struggle against Daniel Henry Chamberlain in the gubernatorial election of 1876, Wade Hampton adopted moderate racial policies and favored many Republican proposals. For instance, the state modified the agriculture lien law and passed a law giving counties the ability to mandate the fencing of livestock. Hampton also appointed many blacks to government positions and provided for more funds to be spent educating black children than white children.

=== Republican convention ===
The state Republican Party held their convention in Columbia on August 7 and August 8. The white Republican leaders opposed fielding a slate of candidates for statewide offices and even proposed a resolution to endorse Hampton. They felt that any opposition to Hampton would only encourage the Democrats to mount an aggressive and unified campaign. Instead, they proposed for the party to concentrate its resources on contesting the local races in hopes that the Democrats would not vigorously contest those elections due to lack of competition at the state level.

However, many prominent black Republicans favored fielding a slate of statewide candidates and launch an all out campaign against the Democrats. The sentiment among the delegates favored this position, but party chairman, Robert B. Elliott, and other Republican leaders managed to convince the delegates the futility of fielding a statewide campaign. When a resolution was offered to pledge the Republican Party to field a state ticket, it was defeated by a vote of 85–35. The platform of the party adopted at the convention merely stated that a full slate was inexpedient because it was "impossible for Republican voters to organize and vote without incurring great personal danger". Thus, the campaign of 1878 for the Republicans was left up to the county organizations.

=== Fusion ===
An attitude of apathy and defeatism swept through the Republican camp and most were resigned to the inevitable destruction of the party. One leader commented that it was highly unlikely "that the Republicans could succeed without federal troops in 1878 where they had failed with them in 1876." Several Republican county organizations passed resolutions supporting Hampton's reelection for governor and even endorsed Democratic candidates for county offices. For example, in Marion County the Republicans placed five out of nine Democratic candidates on their ticket in a policy of fusion.

=== Democratic division ===
Throughout Hampton's first term in office, he appealed for political harmony between the races. Hampton carried out his pledge to ensure equal rights between the races and he appointed more black men to office than Chamberlain had during his term as governor. The more militant faction of the Democratic Party, led by Martin Gary, was entirely against any cooperation with blacks and instead sought to remove blacks completely from political life. The Edgefield County Democrats would not acknowledge any black Democratic clubs and they prevented blacks from participating in the primary elections. Hampton publicly refuted this policy and no other county followed suit. Nevertheless, new laws were enacted by the General Assembly in 1877 to make it harder for blacks to participate and vote in the electoral process.

== General election ==
The general election was held on November 5, 1878, and Wade Hampton was reelected as governor of South Carolina with no organized opposition, although there was much more electoral fraud and violence than the election in 1876. For instance, on Edisto Island where 1,000 Republicans and 50 Democrats resided, the polls never opened. The Red Shirts in Fairfield County physically beat anyone who dared vote for a Republican. Combined with the lack of a Republican candidate and new prohibitive voting laws, turnout was not surprisingly much less than the 1876 election.

South Carolina Gubernatorial Election, 1878
Party	Candidate	Votes	%	±%
Democratic	Wade Hampton III (incumbent)	119,550	99.82	+49.5
No party	Write-Ins	213	0.18	+0.2
Majority		119,337	99.64	+99.0
Turnout		119,763		
Democratic hold				

== See also ==
- Governor of South Carolina
- List of governors of South Carolina
- South Carolina gubernatorial elections

== Notes ==
Preceded by 1876	South Carolina gubernatorial elections	Succeeded by 1880
