= Lawrence Cain =

American politician

South Carolina House of Representatives
- In office 1868–1872

South Carolina Senate
- In office 1872–1876
- Succeeded by: Martin Witherspoon Gary

Personal details
- Born: c. 1844
- Died: 1884 (aged 39–40)
- Party: Republican
- Education: University of South Carolina

Military service
- Allegiance: Confederate States of America
- Branch/service: Confederate States Army
- Battles/wars: Civil War

Lawrence Cain (c. 1844–1884) was a lawyer, state representative, state senator, and public official in various offices during the Reconstruction era.

Owned as a slave by Zachariah W. Carwile during his youth, he served as a body servant of Confederate Army officer Thomas W. Carwile during the American Civil War. He was emancipated after the American Civil War.

He was elected to the South Carolina House in 1868 and the state senate in 1872. In 1876, he lost his re-election campaign to Martin Witherspoon Gary, who served as a general in the Confederate Army and became a leader among the Red Shirts, which reduced African American voter participation through intimidation and assaults.

Cain was in the first graduating class of African American lawyers from the University of South Carolina. It was resegregated along with other educational institutions as the Reconstruction era in South Carolina ended and it was closed off for African Americans.

One of Cain's descendants wrote a biography about him: Virtue of Cain: From Slave to Senator.
