= Henry Shultz =

- Born: Klaus Hinrich Klahn; October 10, 1776; Dahme, Duchy of Holstein
- Died: October 13, 1851 (aged 75); Hamburg, South Carolina, USA
- Occupations: Entrepreneur, real estate developer
- Known for: Founder of Hamburg, S.C.

Henry Shultz (October 10, 1776 – October 13, 1851) was a colorful entrepreneur in Northern Germany and the American South. He caused an important bridge to be built across the Savannah River at Augusta, Georgia, and founded the town of Hamburg, South Carolina.

== Early life ==
Shultz was born Klaus Hinrich Klahn in the village of Dahme on the Baltic coast of Holstein, when this duchy was in personal union with the kingdom of Denmark. He left Dahme for the port city of Lübeck at age 16, in time becoming a wealthy trader there and in nearby Wismar. Economic dislocation during the Napoleonic Wars pushed Klahn's business into failure. He changed his name, escaped his debtors to Altona, near Hamburg, Germany, and finally stowed away on a ship bound for America.

== Career ==
Shultz came to Augusta, Georgia in 1806 and took up as a laborer on the Savannah River pole boats. These carried upcountry produce such as tobacco (and later, cotton) to Savannah, Georgia, and returned with manufactured items such as metal goods, paper, and cloth. In 1809 he purchased his own boat.

In 1814 he engaged the support of a 'mechanic' named Lewis Cooper, secured financing, and drove the construction of a Savannah River bridge at Augusta. Two previous bridges had been swept away by floods, but his bridge proved remarkably durable and served the city well until 1888.

Shultz took advantage of the great success of his bridge, using it to capitalize the Bridge Company of Augusta, complete with currency known as 'Bridge Bills' that circulated widely.

'Bridge Bill'

All of this came to an end during the Panic of 1819. The Bridge Company failed, the Bridge Bills became worthless, and the bridge itself fell into the hands of a creditor. The enraged Shultz concluded that the citizens of Augusta conspired against him to take away his hard-earned accomplishments. Driven to desperation, Shultz attempted suicide with a pistol, but survived.

As revenge, Shultz enlisted the support of property owners on the opposite side of the river, and in 1821 founded the town of Hamburg, South Carolina. The town grew quickly and by the end of 1821 had 84 houses and 200 inhabitants, directly competing with Augusta in its role as an upriver trading point. Shultz ruled the town as its 'proprietor' and worked continuously to improve it by constructing buildings, streamlining its water and road connections, and encouraging the opening of a bank.

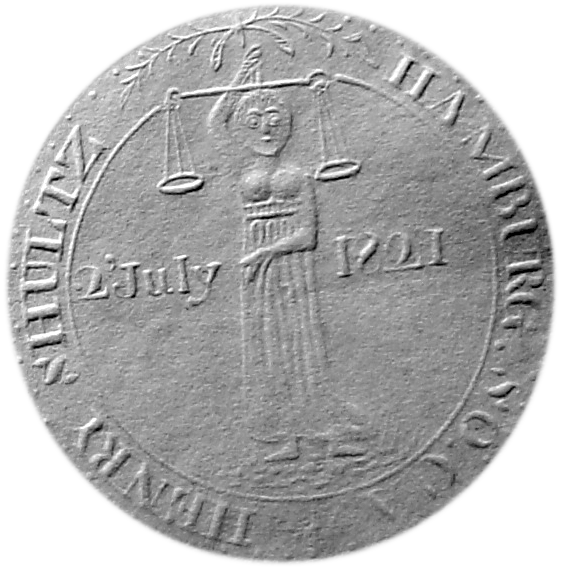
Seal used by Henry Shultz 1825–1850

He used the newspapers to brag about Hamburg's success, deride the hated Augusta, and threaten legal action against his persecutors. Playing on the theme of retaining South Carolina commerce within the State, he successfully appealed to the legislature for tax exemptions and loans, that he used to buy a steamboat and construct buildings. He founded a Mechanics Society, and conducted a Mechanics Festival that amounted to an annual pep rally for his town.

Hamburg grew quickly, but Shultz was derailed by a series of mishaps. A suspect in Shultz's custody died during the investigation of a trunk stolen from a wagon. Shultz was held in the district jail at Edgefield, and in a sensational trial was convicted of manslaughter. He was sentenced to six months' confinement, and then to be branded on the hand with the letter 'M'. But Shultz obtained a pardon from the governor, and apparently escaped the branding.

While Hamburg itself had been a measured success, Shultz had long since run out of money. He had difficulty getting paid for rents and for the sale of lots, and the defaulted Bridge Bills continued to dog him. While in jail for manslaughter, half of Hamburg was sold off in a sheriff's sale. In 1828 Shultz found himself in jail again, this time for bankruptcy. He was forced to turn his remaining assets over to his creditors. In the following years he was able to obtain some forgiveness and renewed support from the state, and despite his diminished role, continued to foster 'his' town.

== Death and legacy ==
Shultz steadily sold off property in order to maintain himself. He died intestate and in poverty on October 13, 1851, at the age of 75 in Hamburg, South Carolina. To his death he maintained his alias and was generally believed to have been born in 'Hamburg on the Elbe'.

Hamburg quickly declined during the 1850s, and by the time of the war was a ghost town. The town enjoyed a resurgence during reconstruction as a home for displaced freedmen, but in 1876 was the site of the Hamburg massacre. Hamburg once again dwindled until its final destruction in a Savannah River flood in 1929.

Shultz Township in present-day Aiken County is named in his honor.
