= Prince Rivers =

American politician (1824-1887)

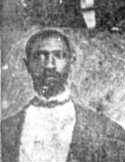

South Carolina House of Representatives
- In office 1868–1874

Personal details
- Born: c. 1824
- Died: 1887
- Party: Republican

Military service
- Allegiance: United States
- Rank: Sergeant
- Unit: 1st South Carolina Volunteers
- Battles/wars: Civil War

Prince R. Rivers (c. 1824–1887) was a former enslaved man from South Carolina who served as a soldier in the Union Army and as a state politician during the Reconstruction era. He escaped and joined Union lines, becoming a sergeant in the 1st South Carolina Volunteers, a Union regiment in the American Civil War.

He had gained literacy as an enslaved man and after the war joined the Republican Party. He served as a delegate to the 1868 South Carolina Constitutional Convention, becoming known as an orator. He was one of three African-American founders of Aiken County in 1871, helped pick the site for the courthouse, and served as the state legislator from the county through 1874. He also served as a trial judge.

== Early life and education ==
Born into slavery in Beaufort, South Carolina, Prince R. Rivers worked on the Henry Middleton Stuart, Sr. (1803–1872) or H.M. Stuart plantation known as Oak Point or Pages Point. He served with the household staff and as carriage driver, among the elite of the estate's slaves, and learned to read and write. He escaped from slavery in 1862 after his master moved with his slaves to Edgefield County. Rivers stole one of Stuart's horses and rode through the Confederate lines to Beaufort, which was occupied by Union troops. He volunteered to enlist in the Union Army with the First South Carolina Volunteers. By the summer of 1862, more than 10,000 slaves had fled from Lowcountry and Midlands plantations to join Union lines along the coast.

== Serving the Union Army ==
Rivers was among the slaves (and their families) declared free in 1862 by Union General David Hunter under Congress' Confiscation Act of 1861. Hunter's decision was considered controversial, and the general was prohibited from enlisting former slaves. But they served in "Hunter's Regiment" with unpaid status for a time, and Rivers said he never regretted it.

In 1863, Rivers became a non-commissioned officer in the newly formed 1st South Carolina Volunteers of the United States Colored Troops. His commanding officer, Colonel Thomas Wentworth Higginson, wanted to promote him to a commissioned rank but was prevented by his superiors because of Rivers' race. Higginson said of Rivers in an 1865 article in The Liberator, "No anti-slavery novel has described a man of such marked ability. He makes Toussaint perfectly intelligible; and if there should ever be a black monarchy in South Carolina, he will be its king."

The 1st South Carolina Volunteers and other African-American soldiers were promised at enlistment in writing to be paid the same as other soldiers. However, under the Militia Act of 1862, were paid less than half that. They and their supporters lobbied the government but did not gain full pay until June 1864, when an Act of Congress granted them equal pay, including what they were due retroactively. Nearly 180,000 African Americans served in the war and were critical to Union victory.

== Reconstruction era ==
After the war, Rivers returned to the Edgefield District, eventually settling on a farm outside Hamburg, which became a black-majority town in this period, with a thriving community. He entered the Republican Party and became active in state politics. He had reportedly learned to read and write while a slave, and proved to be a skilled orator and essayist. He served as registrar for Edgefield County in 1867. In the South Carolina Constitutional Convention of 1868, he was the delegate from Edgefield.

He was elected as a state legislator and later as a trial judge, and was deeply involved with Reconstruction politics. Rivers was one of three African-American founders of Aiken County, established by the state legislature in 1871 during Reconstruction, and he helped pick the site for the county courthouse. After a redistricting in 1872, Rivers was the state representative from the newly organized Aiken County. He later served as mayor, county coroner and justice of the peace, all local offices newly available to black candidates.

In 1876, Prince Rivers was the judge in a hearing in Hamburg related to events on July 4, when white farmers claimed that an all-black unit of the National Guard blocked the street by their parade on Independence Day. The hearing was attended by more than 100 armed members from nearby Red Shirts chapters, among the thousands of armed white men in rifle clubs; the farmers' lawyer demanded that the black militia be disarmed. Though Rivers tried in a separate meeting to persuade the local Guard militia to give up their weapons, and the white paramilitary to back down, his efforts failed. The freedmen retreated to the armory and held off an attack by the white militia, in which one white man died. They tried to escape after seeing the white militia bring up a cannon. Two blacks were killed on the street, and the white militia captured about 25 freedmen who had left the armory. They murdered four outright later that night while holding them as prisoners at what was called the Dead Ring, and wounded seven other black men.

After the trial, Rivers' home was burned and property stolen or destroyed by Red Shirts. Violence continued in the following weeks as the white militia worked to suppress black voting in the Upland counties, with a massacre of an estimated 30-100 blacks over several days in September in Ellenton. The Democrats regained control of the state legislature and governor's office in 1876, in an election marked by fraud. It was settled in a national compromise by which the Republican administration agreed to withdraw federal troops from the South, officially ending Reconstruction.

In South Carolina, white Democrats passed laws to impose segregation and "Jim Crow", and continued violence at elections, but African-American George Henry White was elected to US Congress in the 1890s. In 1895 the Democrats passed a new constitution that included requirements that effectively disfranchised blacks in the state. After the rise of whites and imposition of white supremacy, Rivers worked as a house painter and coachman until his death at age 65.
