= South Carolina civil disturbances of 1876 =

Race riots and civil unrest in the US

The South Carolina civil disturbances of 1876 were a series of race riots and civil unrest related to the Democratic Party's political campaign to take back control from Republicans of the state legislature and governor's office through their paramilitary Red Shirts division. Part of their plan was to disrupt Republican political activity and suppress black voting, particularly in counties where populations of whites and blacks were close to equal. Former Confederate general Martin W. Gary's "Plan of the Campaign of 1876" gives the details of planned actions to accomplish this.

The following incidents took place mostly in counties where blacks were in the majority, but not significantly. The Upstate counties had majorities of whites and racial disturbances were uncommon, whereas the Lowcountry counties had an overwhelming black population. White militias were not so active there. In the Midlands, Edgefield District and Charleston area, Democrats exerted considerable effort to step up the Democratic vote and suppress black Republican voting by intimidation and violence, including outright murder and assassination of a black state representative.

In 1875 Charleston had a population that was 57% black, with a Charleston County population that was 73% black. Having had a tradition of a well-established class of free people of color in the city, African Americans organized to defend themselves during this volatile period.

By suppressing the black majority in Edgefield County and election fraud (2,000 more votes were counted than the total number of registered voters in the county), the Democrats elected Wade Hampton III as the Democratic candidate by a narrow margin of slightly more than 1100 votes statewide. They also carried the state legislature.

== July ==
=== Hamburg massacre ===
Located across the Savannah River from Augusta, the small majority-black town of Hamburg in Aiken County was the site of a confrontation on Independence Day between white slaveholders and a unit of the Hamburg National Guard, made up of freedmen, who were parading. The slaveholders went to court to complain of being blocked on the street; their attorney demanded the militia give up their arms, which they refused to do. Trying to escape that night, two freedmen were killed by white paramilitary. The whites captured about two dozen blacks and formed a Dead Ring. They murdered four blacks outright that night on July 8 and wounded several more. Ben Tillman led one of the paramilitary groups and established renown for promoting white supremacy. Word of the events at Hamburg traveled throughout the state. A Coroner's jury indicted 94 white men in the attack, including "M. C. Butler, Benjamin R. Tillman, A. P. Butler and others of the most prominent men in Aiken and Edgefield Counties, South Carolina, and Richmond County, Georgia" but it appears they were never prosecuted.

== September ==
=== Charleston ===
By September, Charleston seethed with political activity. Following two Democratic meetings earlier in the week in which blacks explained why they had left the Republican Party, on the night of September 6 in Charleston, a black Democratic club held a meeting at Archer's Hall on King Street. Two black speakers, including J.R. Jenkins, criticized the Republicans, including an insult to black women. After the meeting white Democrats escorted the last speaker from the meeting, and they were followed by Republicans who had heard the speech. The whites fired a pistol above the heads of gathering black Republicans but that attracted more African Americans, and fighting started. US troops escorted the black Democrats to safety, but the whites and police were outnumbered and could not quell the mob. Blacks continued to roam, looting on King Street and nearby, as the outnumbered police (a mixed group racially) could not quell their activity. They were escorted safely to The Citadel grounds at Marion Square. Unusually, more whites than blacks were injured in this riot; the one white death was attributed to a mistaken shot by a white man.

No Democratic rifle clubs intervened that evening after consultation with the police; they feared provoking a larger riot. Their officers met the next day, making a plan to have rifle clubs available at short notice every night when political meetings were held. Tensions remained high in the city but their officers met the next day, and guns for sale in the city were quickly gone. Two nights later the Democrats met at Hibernian Hall without incident. The inability of Governor Chamberlain and the local law authorities to preserve the peace convinced the people of the state of the failure of Republican rule. Southerners portrayed the actions of freedmen as menacing, trying to win over public opinion in the North. Northerners found the continuing insurgency in the southern states to be disheartening. Historian Ehren K. Foley noted that the event "demonstrated the continued mobilization and strength of both the Republican party and the African American community in the low country of South Carolina. The event also demonstrated the willingness of both sides to deploy force for political ends."

=== Ellenton massacre ===
In September 1876 the Ellenton massacre occurred. It started September 15 and lasted to the 21st. The initiation of the Ellenton massacre began when a white posse attempted to serve warrants of arrest issued by an African-American Magistrate Prince Rivers[1] for two people suspected of breaking and entering. The events escalated until two white men and 39 African-American were killed. The most notable being Simon P. Coker who served as a member of the Legislature from Barnwell.

== October ==
=== Cainhoy ===
In Charleston County, leaders of the political parties arranged some of what they called discussion meetings, as the Democrats were still seeking Republican audiences, and both parties would have speakers. Given the tensions and violent incidents, they agreed that attendees should not bring arms (rifles and shotguns) into the meetings. A Republican Party meeting was scheduled at the White Church in Cainhoy on October 16, about 12 miles from Charleston. Learning of this, Democrats from Charleston chartered the steamer Pocosin and about 150 white men went to Cainhoy for the meeting. The meeting had an audience of about 500, mostly black.

In the South, men of both races regularly carried pistols, which were not counted as "arms." The leaders had asked the men to leave those weapons behind, and many blacks had stashed their weapons in the swamp and an old house near the church. When some young whites found the rifles, they approached the meeting. One gun discharged accidentally and the crowd began to disperse; one of the whites shot an elderly black man, who was killed. Blacks raced to retrieve their arms and pursued the retreating Democrats, who had only pistols and were outnumbered.

The incident at Cainhoy resulted in the death of one black man and five to six whites, plus wounding of an estimated 16 to 50. It was the only one of these political incidents in 1876 in which more whites were killed than blacks. According to Reynolds, the black Republicans avoided being taken by surprise by the Democrats and succeeded in running them off. Most historians note that the Democrats were put off balance by the black resistance. With the threat of retaliatory attacks by the whites, Governor Chamberlain sent a company of Federal troops to the town to prevent any more bloodshed.

=== Edgefield ===
On October 17, a group of six white men of the Red Shirts were leaving a Democratic meeting in Edgefield and were ambushed by two black brothers from a cotton patch about three miles outside the town. One of the white men was shot and killed, and the other departed to fetch the coroner and some reinforcements. Several other black men joined the brothers in the cotton field and fired their rifles, wounding the coroner in the leg. The Red Shirts threatened retaliation, but were restrained by General Martin Gary and Wade Hampton because the black men were on state property. A total of five black men were arrested for the assault.

== November ==
=== Charleston ===
In Charleston on the afternoon of November 8, Edmund W. M. Mackey, a white Republican leader, read aloud the election results from Republican newspapers to a crowd of blacks at the corner of Meeting and Broad streets. As he walked down Broad street to the office of the News and Courier, a drunk white man struck Mackey's face with his hat and in the ensuing scuffle, a gunshot went off. The blacks at the outskirts of the crowd yelled that Mackey had been killed and rushed to him. White men fired at them, and both groups dispersed after arrival of police.

A number of the black policeman joined the rebellion instead of restoring order. A white man who asked for assistance from a black police officer was clubbed, and the black policeman fired their guns indiscriminately at any white person they saw. A call to action went out to all the rifle clubs and Red Shirts in Charleston; more than 500 paramilitary white men assembled by five o'clock. Two companies of federal troops approached the rifle clubs to get them to back down and reestablish order. The whites suffered one killed and twelve wounded, while the blacks had one killed and ten wounded.

=== Beaufort ===
During election night of November 7 in Beaufort after the closing of the polls, a black Democrat was assaulted and beaten by black Republicans. The next day he went to report the beating to a trial justice. He sent Constable J. H. Shuman on November 14 to make arrests, but was killed when the black Republicans violently resisted arrest. Outraged red shirts across the Lowcountry gathered and restored order in the area while heeding calls from Wade Hampton to limit bloodshed and show mercy.

== See also ==
- South Carolina gubernatorial election, 1876
- History of South Carolina
