= New Ellenton, South Carolina =

- City
- Seal
- Motto: We didn't move away. We just moved.
- Location within South Carolina Location within the United States
- Coordinates: 33°25′11″N 81°40′57″W
- Country: United States
- State: South Carolina
- County: Aiken
- Incorporated: April 26, 1952; 74 years ago

Area
  - Total: 4.44 sq mi (11.51 km^{2})
  - Land: 4.44 sq mi (11.50 km^{2})
  - Water: 0.0039 sq mi (0.01 km^{2})
- Elevation: 427 ft (130 m)

Population (2020)
  - Total: 2,210
  - Density: 497.7/sq mi (192.17/km^{2})
- Time zone: UTC-5 (Eastern (EST))
  - Summer (DST): UTC-4 (EDT)
- ZIP code: 29809
- Area codes: 803, 839
- FIPS code: 45-49705
- GNIS feature ID: 2406974
- Website: cityofnewellenton.sc.gov

New Ellenton is a city in Aiken County, South Carolina, United States. The population was 2,210 at the 2020 census. It is part of the Augusta, Georgia metropolitan area.

== History ==
New Ellenton was formed from the citizens of Ellenton, a farming town chartered in 1880 and situated on the Charleston and Western Carolina Railway in Barnwell County near the Aiken County line. Upon the approval of President Truman in 1950 of the Savannah River Site for the production of hydrogen bombs, the U.S. government forced 6,000 people in the surrounding area to move. The residents of Ellenton literally moved their homes and buildings 14 miles (23 km) north to New Ellenton after being evicted in the 1950s.

== Geography ==
New Ellenton is located in southern Aiken County, about 1 mile (1.6 km) north of the U.S. Department of Energy Savannah River Site. South Carolina Highway 19 is Main Street for the community, leading north 10 miles (16 km) to Aiken, the county seat, and south 1 mile to U.S. Route 278, which leads west 17 miles (27 km) to Augusta, Georgia, and southeast 24 miles (39 km) to Barnwell.

According to the United States Census Bureau, the town has a total area of 4.8 square miles (12.4 km^{2}), all land.

== Demographics ==
Historical population
Census	Pop.	Note	%±
1960	2,309		—
1970	2,546		10.3%
1980	2,628		3.2%
1990	2,515		−4.3%
2000	2,250		−10.5%
2010	2,052		−8.8%
2020	2,210		7.7%
U.S. Decennial Census

=== 2020 census ===
New Ellenton racial composition
Race	Num.	Perc.
White (non-Hispanic)	1,192	53.94%
Black or African American (non-Hispanic)	788	35.66%
Native American	2	0.09%
Asian	12	0.54%
Other/Mixed	116	5.25%
Hispanic or Latino	100	4.52%

As of the 2020 United States census, there were 2,210 people, 937 households, and 576 families residing in the town.

=== 2000 census ===
As of the census of 2000, there were 2,250 people, 876 households, and 616 families residing in the town. The population density was 449.4 inhabitants per square mile (173.5/km^{2}). There were 1,079 housing units at an average density of 215.5 per square mile (83.2/km^{2}). The racial makeup of the town was 60.62% White, 35.82% African American, 0.58% Native American, 0.36% Asian, 0.89% from other races, and 1.73% from two or more races. Hispanic or Latino of any race were 2.18% of the population.

There were 876 households, out of which 28.7% had children under the age of 18 living with them, 50.3% were married couples living together, 15.3% had a female householder with no husband present, and 29.6% were non-families. 26.4% of all households were made up of individuals, and 9.8% had someone living alone who was 65 years of age or older. The average household size was 2.54 and the average family size was 3.06.

In the town the population was spread out, with 24.8% under the age of 18, 8.1% from 18 to 24, 26.8% from 25 to 44, 23.8% from 45 to 64, and 16.4% who were 65 years of age or older. The median age was 39 years. For every 100 females, there were 91.8 males. For every 100 females age 18 and over, there were 87.3 males.

The median income for a household in the town was $38,125, and the median income for a family was $45,521. Males had a median income of $41,250 versus $21,810 for females. The per capita income for the town was $17,915. About 6.9% of families and 11.8% of the population were below the poverty line, including 16.3% of those under age 18 and 11.0% of those age 65 or over.

== Education ==
It is in the Aiken County Public School District. Greendale Elementary School is in the town limits, and New Ellenton Middle STEAM Magnet School is adjacent to the town limits.

Zoned schools are Greendale Elementary School, New Ellenton Middle School, and Silver Bluff High School. Silver Bluff High opened in 1981 as a consolidated high school for New Ellenton, Beech Island, and Jackson.

New Ellenton has a public library, a branch of the ABBE Regional Library System.
