= Ellenton, South Carolina =

Human settlement in the United States

Coordinates: 33°11′56″N 81°45′21″W

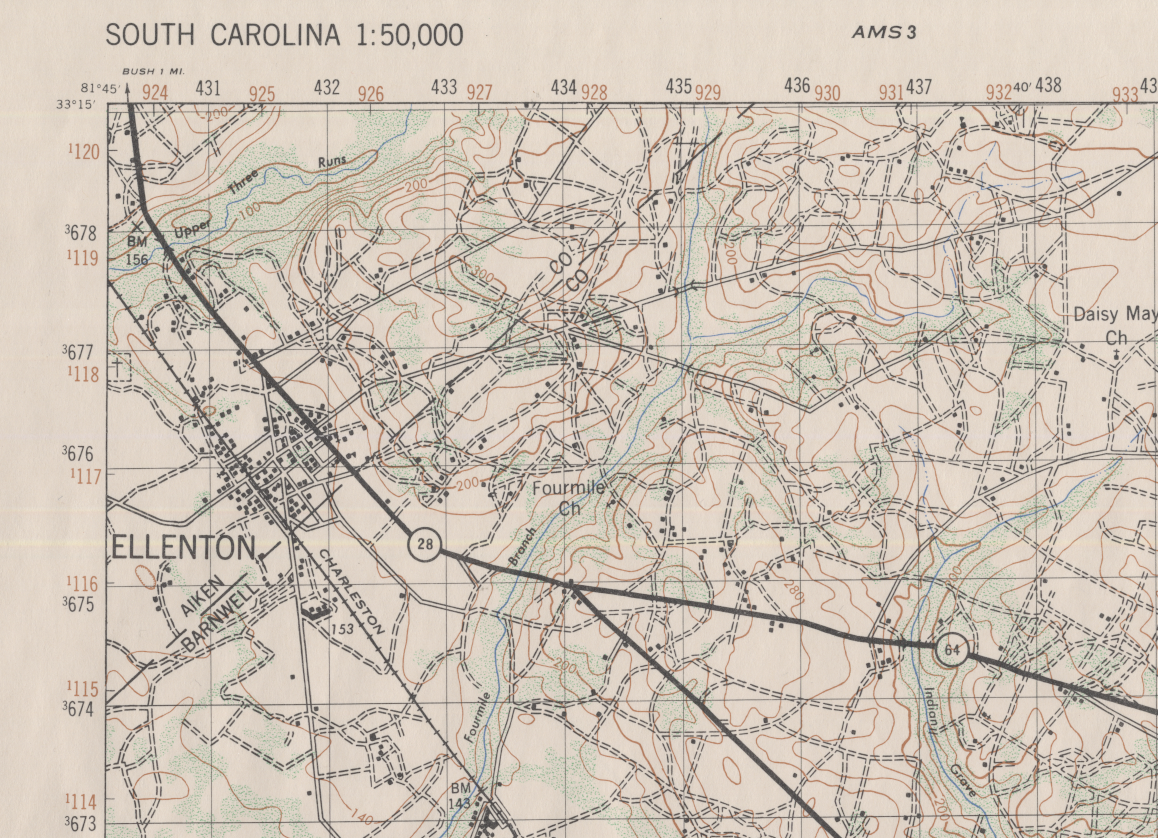
A topographic map showing Ellenton from 1949.

Ellenton is a former community that was located on the border between Barnwell and Aiken counties, South Carolina, United States. Ellenton was settled c. 1870.

In 1950 the town was acquired by the U.S. Atomic Energy Commission as part of a site for development of the Savannah River Plant, a nuclear plant. All the residences and businesses were acquired, and two new towns, New Ellenton, South Carolina and Jackson, South Carolina, were built. The plant was between the current CSX railroad and the current SC Highway 125, Upper Three Runs Creek, and Four Mile Branch. SC Highway 125 was U.S. Highway 278 in the 1950s.

== History ==
=== Early history ===
The settlement began with the construction of the Port Royal and Augusta Railroad, which was later renamed the Charleston and Western Carolina Railway. It was taken over by CSX Transportation. It ran through the plantation of Robert Jefferson Dunbar. Part of his land was for the railroad right-of-way, the train station, and town.

Oral tradition of the town tells that Stephen Caldwell Millet, the superintendent of the railroad construction and president of the railroad, boarded with the Dunbar family. He was so struck with the beauty of Ellen Dunbar, the nine-year-old daughter of the Dunbars, that he asked his company to name the station "Ellen's Town." In a note to the O'Berry book, the Savannah River Archeological Research Program indicates that in 1870, when this was supposed to have taken place, Mary Ellen Dunbar was twenty-two years old.

=== Ellenton massacre ===
A massacre occurred in Ellenton from September 15–21, 1876. The initiation of the Ellenton massacre began when a white posse attempted to serve warrants of arrest issued by an African-American Magistrate Prince Rivers for two people suspected of breaking and entering. The events escalated until two white men and 100 African-Americans were killed, despite local leaders downplaying the numbers. Perhaps the most notable fatality was that of Simon P. Coker, who served as a member of the Legislature from Barnwell.

== Late 19th century to present ==
The town of Ellenton was incorporated in 1880. For most of its years, it was an agricultural, trading, and sawmill town. It declined through the downturn of cotton prices after World War I and the Depression of the 1930s. By the early 1950s, Ellenton had a population of about 760, about 190 residences, about 30 commercial buildings, five churches, two schools including Ellenton High School, one cotton gin, a city hall and jail, and the railroad station.

Ellenton had the first automatic telephone dialing system in South Carolina. After the bank failures in the Great Depression, Ellenton had the first cash depository in South Carolina.

=== Exodus ===
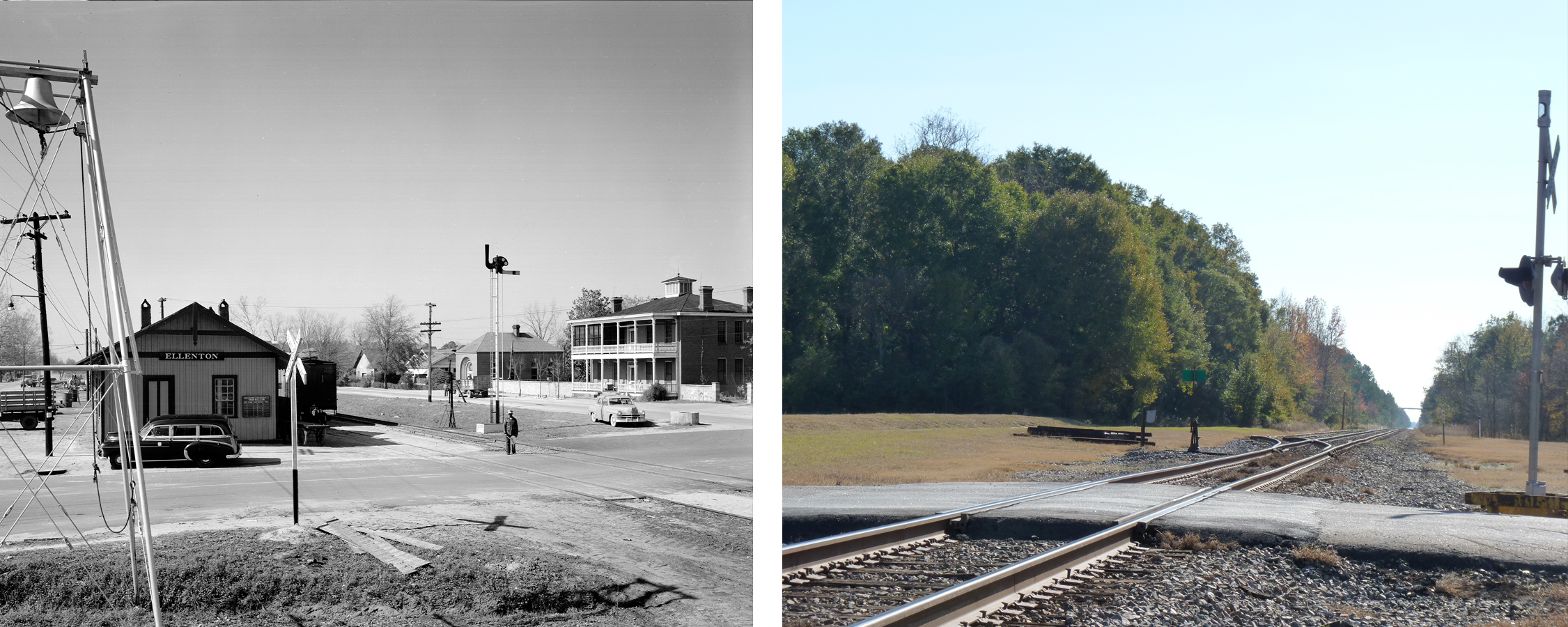
Ellenton in 1950 (left) and 2010 (right)

On November 28, 1950, the U.S. Atomic Energy Commission and the E. I. du Pont de Nemours Company announced that the Savannah River Plant would be built on about 300 square miles (780 km^{2}). of Aiken, Barnwell, and Allendale counties in South Carolina. The Savannah River Plant was built for the production of plutonium and tritium for the H-bomb.

About 6,000 people and 6,000 graves were to be relocated. This included the incorporated communities of Ellenton and Dunbarton and the unincorporated communities of Hawthorne, Meyers Mill, Robbins, and Leigh. In this relatively poor rural area, a significant fraction of those relocated were African-American farmers and sharecroppers. The government purchased or condemned their properties. Many of the residents moved themselves, and in some cases, their homes to the new town of New Ellenton, South Carolina on U.S. Highway 278, which was eight miles north, or nearby Jackson, Beech Island, Aiken, and North Augusta, South Carolina; and Augusta, Georgia. Some moved out of state. Eventually, most of what remained of the former town were the paved streets, curbs, driveways, and walkways.

== Geography ==
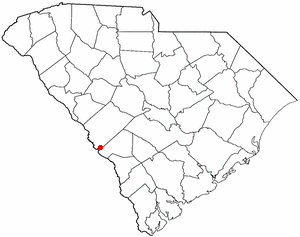
Location of Ellenton, South Carolina

Ellenton's location was approximately 33°13'15" N and 81°43'53" W on the Aiken County – Barnwell County line.

== Legacy ==
New Ellenton was developed to replace Ellenton. An annual reunion of former Ellenton residents started in 1973 and continues today.

The musical, I Don't Live There Anymore: The Ellenton Story, premiered in Dorset, England in 1992. It was produced at the Piccolo Spoleto held during the Spoleto Festival USA in Charleston, South Carolina, in 1993. Ellenton and its fate were the basis for the account of the town of Colleton in the novel The Prince of Tides by Pat Conroy.
