= Hamburg, South Carolina =

Ghost town in South Carolina, US

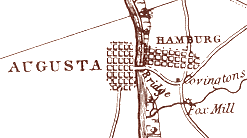
Hamburg, SC as shown in Mills' Atlas, 1825

Hamburg is a ghost town in Aiken County, South Carolina, United States. It was once a thriving upriver market located across the Savannah River from Augusta, Georgia in the Edgefield District. It was founded by Henry Shultz in 1821 who named it after his home town in Germany of the same name. The town was one of the state's primary interior markets by the 1830s, due largely to the fact that the South Carolina Canal and Rail Road Company chose Hamburg as the western terminus of its line to Charleston.

The enervation of the town, which relied on its in-land port being the destination of cotton headed toward the ports of Charleston or Savannah for business, began in 1848 after Augusta siphoned much of the town's river traffic with the completion of the Augusta Canal. The town's decline was finalized in the 1850s when the South Carolina Canal and Rail Road Company extended its line into Augusta.

After the American Civil War, Hamburg was repopulated mostly by freedmen and was within newly organized Aiken County. The town became notorious in 1876 as the site of a massacre of blacks by whites in what was one of a number of violent incidents by Democratic paramilitary groups to suppress black voting in that year's elections. The Democrats regained control of the state government and federal troops were withdrawn the next year from South Carolina and other states, ending the Reconstruction era.

== History ==
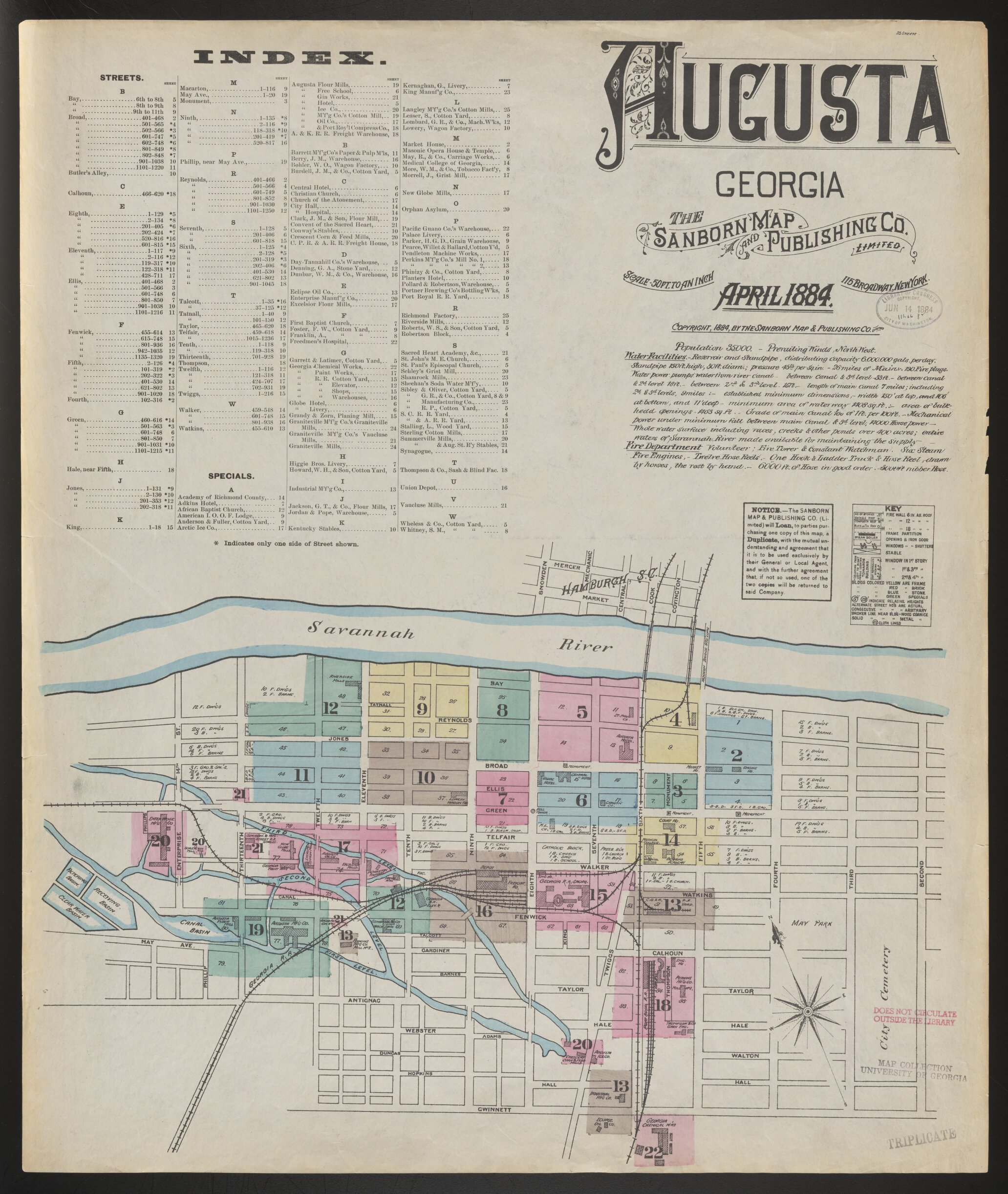
Sanborn insurance map of Augusta, Georgia, created April 1884, showing Hamburg, S.C. and the Savannah River (Digital Library of Georgia)

=== Early years ===
The founder of Hamburg, Henry Shultz, was a parvenu until his origin was discovered in 2016 by Jürgen Möller. Born in Germany in 1776 as Klaus Hinrich Klahn, Shultz arrived in Augusta in 1806 as a simple day worker. But, by 1813, the business dealings of Shultz had elevated him to a position capable of building a long-lasting bridge across the Savannah River, a feat which one of the wealthiest South Carolinians of the 1790s, Wade Hampton I, had failed to accomplish on two previous occasions.

Shultz would go on to become a leading citizen in the city of Augusta, owning part of the Steamboat Company of Georgia as well as a wharf in Augusta. But, like many bank owners (Shultz used his bridge to back a bank which he called the Bridge Bank) in the 1810s, Shultz issued paper currency which led to his bankruptcy during the Panic of 1819. After being sued by his creditors, the Georgia state officials seized the Augusta Bridge from Shultz.

Shultz felt slighted by the city of Augusta and purchased a swath of land opposite the Savannah River which had previously been owned by Chickasaw indians in order to compete with the city. The following year, Shultz sought and procured loans from the South Carolina General Assembly to improve inland navigation between the town and Charleston. On top of this, the General Assembly exempted all taxable property within the town from taxation for five years.

Shultz established a second bank, the Bank of Hamburg, in 1823, backed by his Hamburg property which "faded into oblivion" within two years. Ten years later, a decade bank was founded with support from the General Assembly. This second iteration became one of the best-known banks in the country, reliable enough to be used by many families to pay colleges in the North. The establishment of the second bank coincided with the decline of the South Carolina wagon trade. From 1819 to 1823, the trade shrunk to one-fourth its former size as steamboats became the cheaper form of transportation for upcountry harvests. The emergence of steamboats led Hamburg and other towns strategically located at the fall lines of major rivers such as Camden and Columbia to become economically important for the first time.

During his American tour as 'Guest of the Nation', the Marquis de Lafayette visited Hamburg on March 24, 1825. In a book recounting their trip, Lafayette's secretary wrote that Lafayette was invited to visit "a sort of prodigy", a "village called Hamburg", which was "not yet two years old and its port was already filled with vessels."

=== Slave market ===
Slave trading was banned in Georgia so planters crossed the Savannah River to purchase in Hamburg until the repeal of the anti-trading law in 1856.

=== Competition with Augusta ===
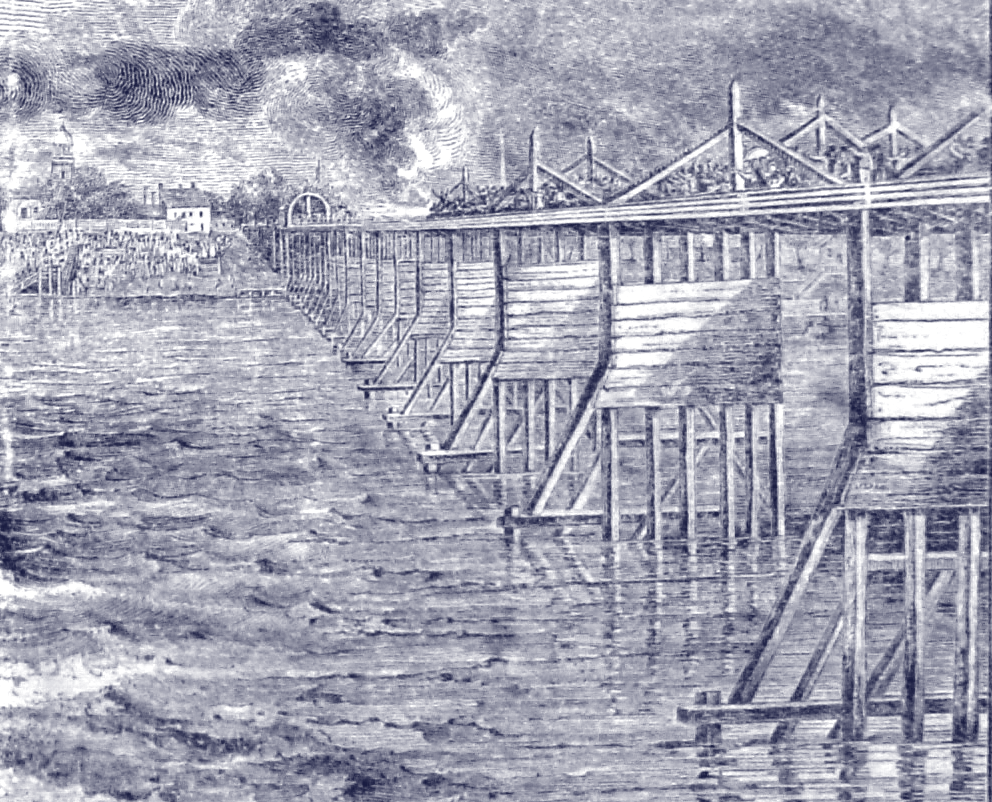
A poster drawing of the Augusta Bridge from 1836.

At the completion of the South Carolina Railroad in 1833 (at the time the largest railroad under single management in the world) Hamburg became the railroad's western terminus.

In its heyday, 60,000 bales of cotton worth $2,000,000 were brought by wagon to Hamburg each year. With the completion of the Augusta Canal (1848) and general expansion of railroads in the 1850s, strenuous overland hauls to Hamburg became unnecessary and the famous wagon traffic declined. Hamburg became a ghost town by the time of the Civil War.

=== After the Civil War ===
Following the war, Hamburg was repopulated and governed by freedmen, starting with Prince Rivers; Samuel J. Lee, a free man before the war, who was elected as the speaker of the House and was the first black man admitted to the South Carolina Bar; and Charles D. Hayne, a freeman from an elite Charleston family. These three men were founders of Aiken County. They began to redevelop Hamburg, attracting freedmen. To celebrate Aiken County's 125th anniversary, a stone-and-bronze marker was installed at the county courthouse. Rivers, Hayne and Lee are listed as founders but their race is not indicated.

After the deaths and damage in the Hamburg Massacre of July 8, 1876, the town declined for good. Augusta began construction of a river levee after a 1911 flood, but Hamburg remained unprotected. Particularly disastrous floods finally forced out the last residents in 1929.

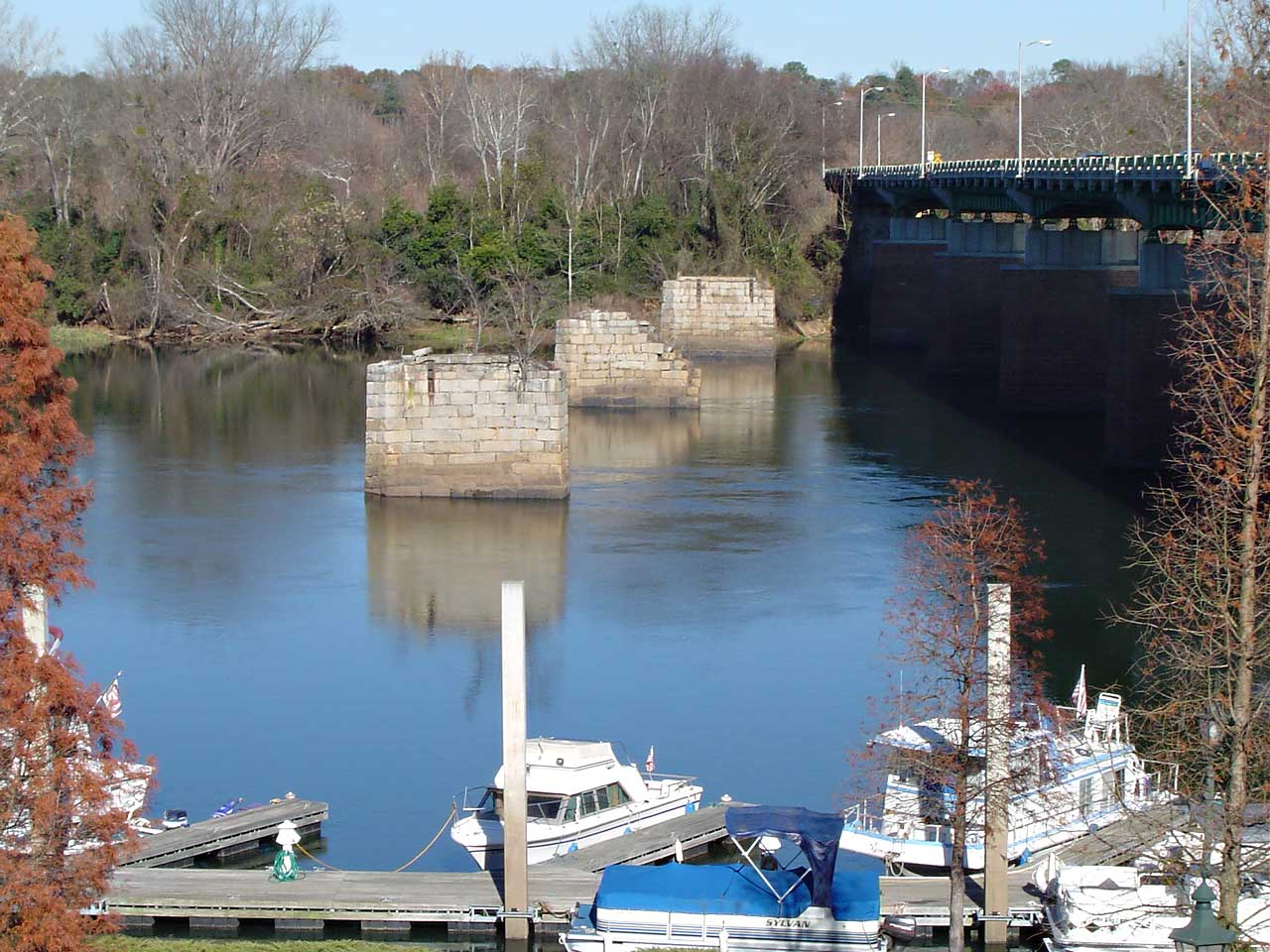
Site of Hamburg, SC viewed from Augusta, GA. The road bridge is at the same location as Henry Shultz's 1814 bridge. The broken piers remain from the South Carolina Rail Road, which operated from 1854 to 1908

== Geography ==
Occasionally styled as Hamburgh (especially after the American Civil War), the town was named after Shultz's home town in Germany. It was located at 33.4799°N, 81.9579°W directly across the Savannah River from Augusta, Georgia. Population at its peak in the 1840s reached 2,500 (Haskel 1843:257), and exceeded 1,000 in the 1870s. For the most part the town was on the Savannah River floodplain. The town was originally accessible by a stagecoach road starting at the Edgefield County Courthouse, and later by the Edgefield and Hamburg Plank Road.

Under protection of the Clarks Hill Dam and Lake, adjacent North Augusta has begun to develop on the grounds of old Hamburg.

== Notable people ==
- James E. Broome, governor of Florida from 1853 to 1857.
- A. Viola Neblett (1842–1897), activist, suffragist, women's rights pioneer
- Marcus Junius Parrott, delegate to the U.S. Congress from Kansas Territory from 1857 to 1861.

== See also ==
- Hamburg massacre
