= Martin Witherspoon Gary =

American politician (1831–1881)

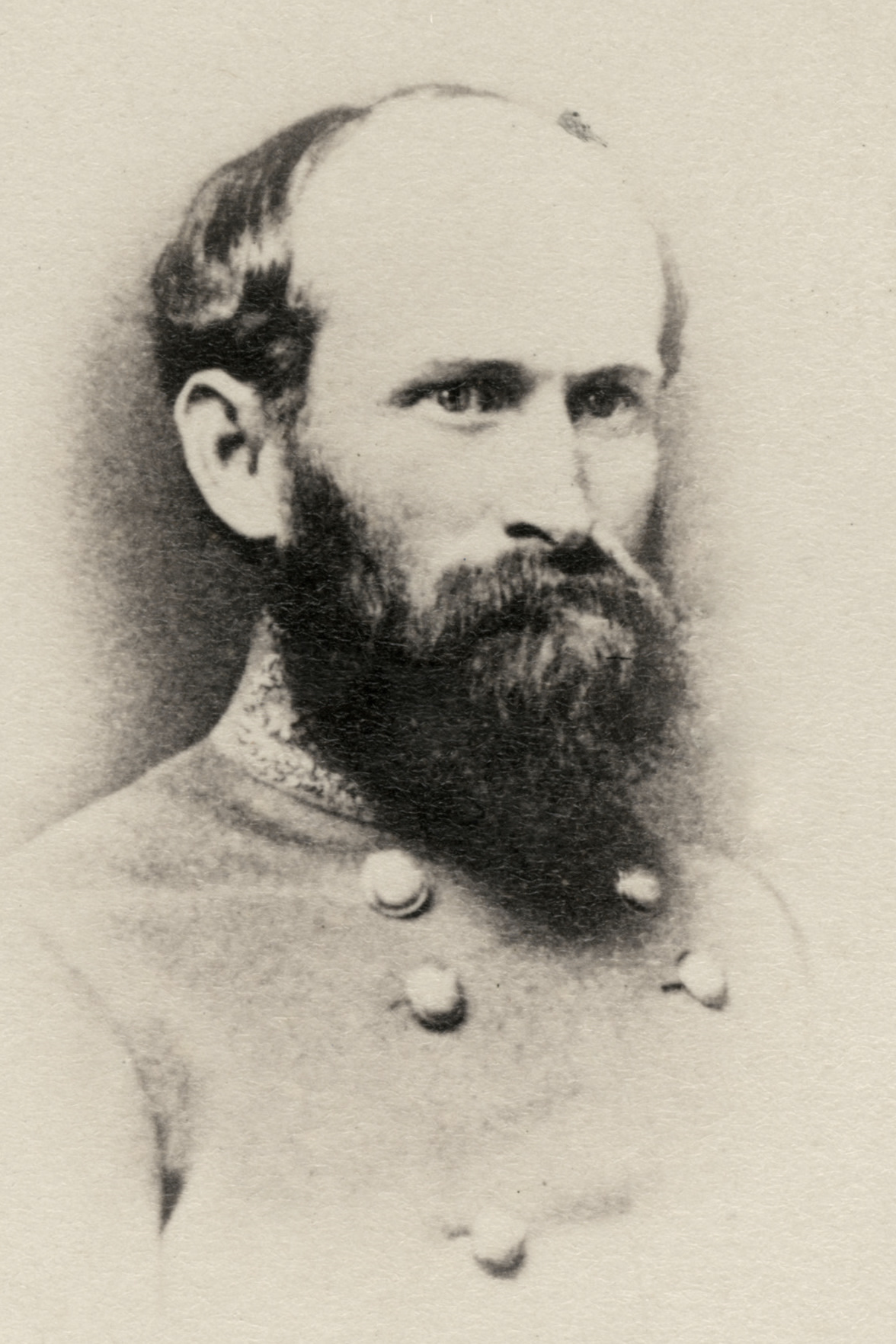

South Carolina Senate
- In office 1876–1881
- Preceded by: Lawrence Cain

Personal details
- Born: March 25, 1831 Cokesbury, South Carolina, U.S.
- Died: April 9, 1881 (aged 50) Cokesbury, South Carolina, U.S.
- Party: Democratic
- Nickname(s): "Bald Eagle" "The Bald Eagle of Edgefield"

Military service
- Allegiance: Confederate States of America
- Branch/service: Confederate States Army
- Rank: Brigadier general
- Battles/wars: American Civil War; Battle of First Manassas; Peninsula Campaign; Northern Virginia Campaign; Maryland Campaign; Battle of Fredericksburg; Siege of Suffolk; Battle of Chickamauga; Knoxville Campaign; Overland Campaign; Petersburg Campaign; Appomattox Campaign

Martin Witherspoon Gary (March 25, 1831 – April 9, 1881) was a Confederate attorney, soldier, and politician from South Carolina. He attained the rank of brigadier general in the Confederate States Army during the American Civil War. In 1876 he played a major leadership role in the Democratic Party's political campaign to elect Wade Hampton III as governor, planning a detailed campaign to disrupt the Republican Party and black voters by violence and intimidation.

Gary was first elected to office as a state representative in 1860. He was elected to the South Carolina State Senate in 1876 from Edgefield, South Carolina, serving two terms. He fell out with Hampton after failing to get appointments to the U.S. Senate in 1877 and 1879, and left politics in 1881 after finishing his second term. He returned to his home in Cokesbury and died in April of that year.

== Early life and career ==
Born in Cokesbury, South Carolina, to Dr. Thomas Reeder Gary and Mary Ann Porter, the young Gary received his primary education at Cokesbury Academy before enrolling at South Carolina College in 1850. His participation in Great Biscuit Rebellion at the University of South Carolina in 1852 resulted in his withdrawal from the state college. The protesters demanded leave from compulsory participation in campus dining which was said to include wormy biscuits. He later returned to his studies and graduated from Harvard in 1854. In 1855, Gary was admitted to the bar in South Carolina and began practicing as a lawyer in Edgefield.

== Civil War ==
Gary was elected in 1860 to the South Carolina House of Representatives as a secessionist. His time in office was short.

When South Carolina seceded in 1861, he joined Hamptons Legion as a captain of infantry. At the First Battle of Manassas, he was given control of the Legion after his superior officers were disabled. By 1862 Gary had been elected as lieutenant colonel of the infantry battalion in the Legion and was promoted to colonel when given control of a regiment. Hampton's Legion came under the command of General Longstreet and was active in the battles of Virginia through mid-1863 before being transferred to help the Army of Tennessee in the latter part of the year.

Back east, Gary was commissioned as a brigadier general of a cavalry brigade. The Brigade was part of the Department of Richmond until January 1865. It included the infantry battalion of Hamptons Legion that had been mounted on March 11, 1864 and transferred from Longstreets Corps. The Brigade was transferred to the Cavalry Corps, Army of Northern Virginia in January 1865, but Gary refused to surrender with General Lee at Appomattox. Instead he led 200 men of his brigade to escort President Davis and his cabinet from Greensboro, North Carolina, to his mother's house in Cokesbury, where he ended his service as a Confederate soldier.

== Postbellum activities ==
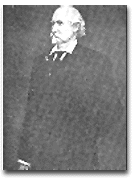
Martin Gary as a State Senator

After the war, Gary resumed his law practice in Edgefield and pursued a number of other business ventures. Fed up with the Radical Republican government which obeyed the constitutional amendments and allowed the African-American majority in the South Carolina population to have a say in the government, he became an outspoken racist. On one occasion he said "that the negro shall not become a part of the body politic, or from any qualification either as to education or property, be allowed to vote in this country." Gary worked with white paramilitary groups, rifle clubs and the Red Shirts, who organized in 1874 to suppress black voting in the state. A manuscript of his "Plan of the Campaign of 1876" shows the level of detail and attention he gave to this project.

In the summer of 1876, Matthew Calbraith Butler wrote to his former commander, Wade Hampton III, urging him to seek the governorship in the upcoming election. Butler omitted the details of the violent campaign planned by Gary and others, and Hampton accepted. Two years later Gary claimed credit for convincing Hampton to run.

It soon became apparent that Hampton did not support Gary's campaign plan, known as a modified version of the Mississippi Plan or the "Shotgun Policy. It was also known in South Carolina as the "Edgefield Plan" due to Gary's leadership in its design and implementation. It called for the bribery or intimidation of African-American Republican voters by local Democratic "rifle clubs" or "Red Shirts," formed ostensibly to attend campaign events and to ensure order at polling places. The Red Shirts conducted parades and rode openly at political gatherings with the overt goal of overturning the Republicans.

Gary's tactics helped Hampton to win, as black Republican voting was deeply suppressed in Aiken and Edgefield counties. Hampton expressed himself as a moderate with paternalistic interest in blacks and won their trust and votes in several areas.

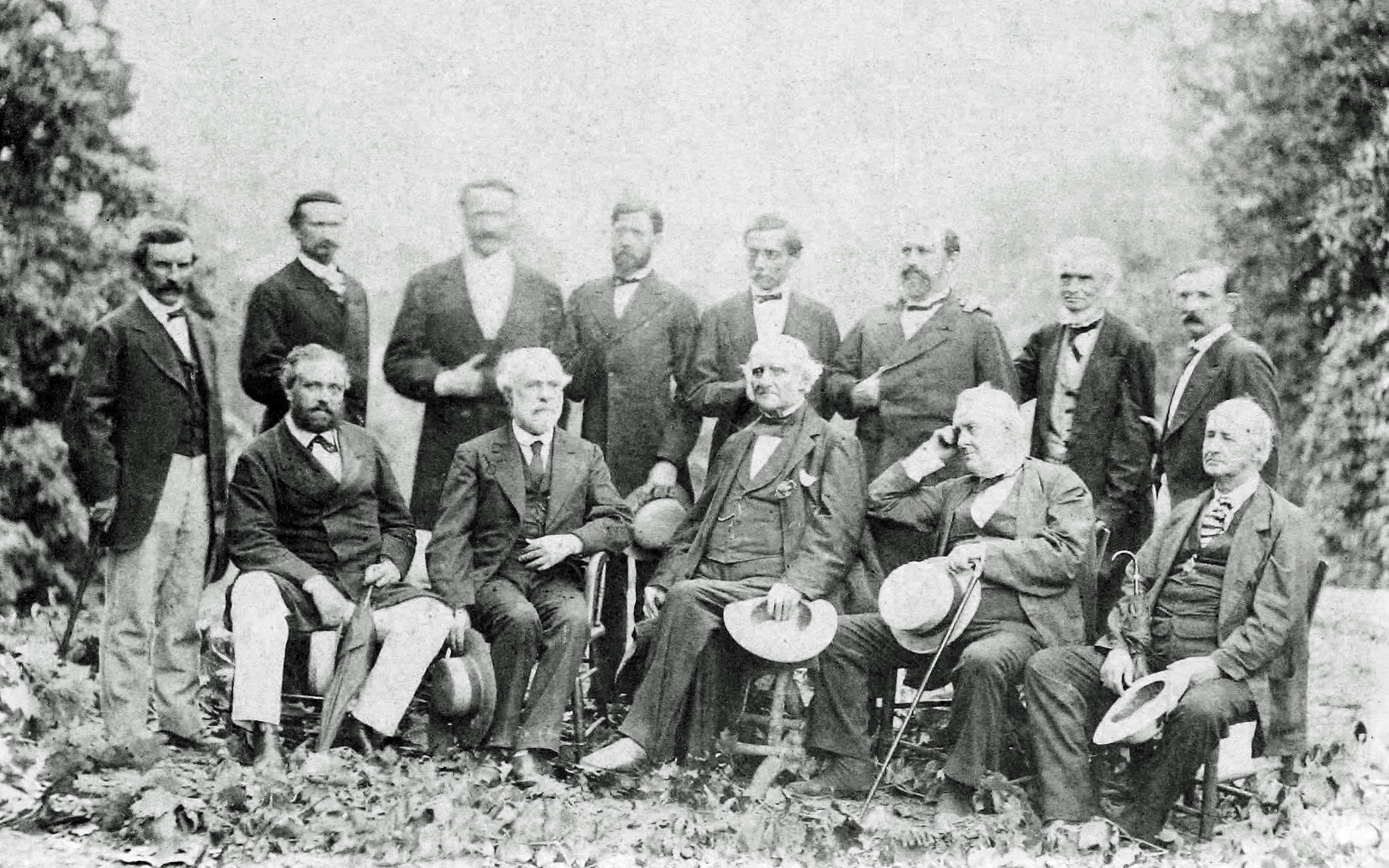
Gary (top row, second from left) with Robert E. Lee and Confederate officers, 1869.

In Edgefield and Laurens counties, the total votes for Hampton exceeded the total number of registered voters. The election returns from these two counties were challenged by the state board of returns. Their contribution was critical, as Hampton had a victory margin of only 1,100 votes statewide.

Hampton's victory was secured as part of a deal between South Carolina Democratic leaders and the national Republican Party. In April 1877 Republican candidate Rutherford B. Hayes received the hitherto contested votes of South Carolina electors and was finally declared the winner of the contested United States presidential race. Hayes ordered the withdrawal of Federal troops from South Carolina and Louisiana, ending the formal Reconstruction era.

Gary was elected to the state senate from Edgefield County in 1876, defeating Lawrence Cain, and was reelected in 1878. During his time in the State Senate, he became a vocal opponent of Governor Hampton because Hampton blocked his appointment to a U.S. Senate seat in 1877 and 1879. Hampton and his allies prevented Gary's candidacy in the gubernatorial election of 1880. Upon leaving the South Carolina Senate in 1881, Gary returned to his family home in Cokesbury. He died there on April 9, and was buried in Tabernacle Cemetery in Cokesbury.

== See also ==
- List of American Civil War generals (Confederate)
