= Red Shirts (United States) =

Southern US paramilitary organization (post-Civil War)

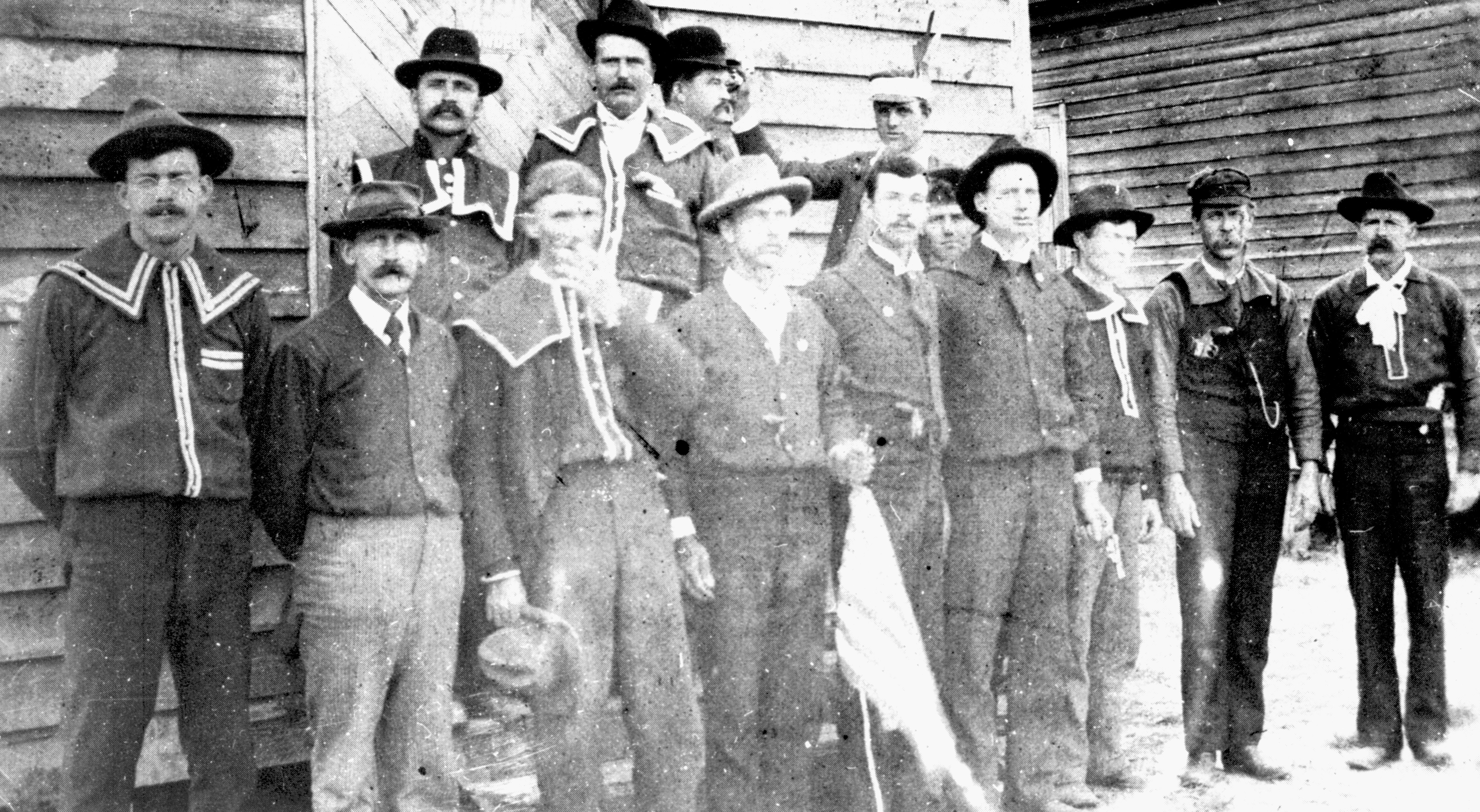
- Red Shirts at a polling place in Old Hundred, North Carolina, on Election Day, November 8, 1898
- Leaders: Benjamin Tillman; Ellison D. Smith; Josephus Daniels; Claude Kitchin
- Dates active: 1875–1900s
- Allegiance: Democratic Party (Redeemers)
- Active regions: Southern U.S. (especially The Carolinas)
- Ideology: White supremacy; Anti-Reconstruction
- Wars: Reconstruction era

The Red Shirts or Redshirts of the Southern United States were white supremacist paramilitary terror groups that were active in the late 19th century in the last years of, and after the end of, the Reconstruction era of the United States. Red Shirt groups originated in Mississippi in 1875, when anti-Reconstruction private terror units adopted red shirts to make themselves more visible and threatening to Southern Republicans, both whites and freedmen. Similar groups in the Carolinas also adopted red shirts.

Among the most prominent Red Shirts were the supporters of Democratic Party candidate Wade Hampton during the campaigns for the South Carolina gubernatorial elections of 1876 and 1878. The Red Shirts were one of several paramilitary organizations, such as the White League in Louisiana, arising from the continuing efforts of white Democrats to regain political power in the South in the 1870s. These groups acted as "the military arm of the Democratic Party".

While sometimes engaging in violent acts of terrorism, the Red Shirts, the White League, rifle clubs, and similar groups in the late nineteenth century worked openly and were better organized than the underground terrorist groups such as the Ku Klux Klan. They used organization, intimidation and force to achieve political purposes of restoring the Democrats to power, overturning Republicans, and repressing civil and voting rights of freedmen. During the 1876 campaign in South Carolina and the 1898 and 1900 campaigns in North Carolina, the Red Shirts played prominent roles in intimidating non-Democratic Party voters.

== Origins and symbolism ==
According to E. Merton Coulter in The South During Reconstruction (1947), the red shirt was adopted in Mississippi in 1875 by "southern brigadiers" of the Democratic Party who were opposed to black Republicans. The Red Shirts disrupted Republican rallies, intimidated or assassinated black leaders, and discouraged and suppressed black voting at the polls.

Men wearing red shirts appeared in Charleston, South Carolina, on August 25, 1876, during a Democratic torchlight parade. This was to mock the waving the bloody shirt speech by Benjamin Franklin Butler of Massachusetts, in which he was falsely claimed to have held up a shirt stained with the blood of a carpetbagger whipped by the Ku Klux Klan during the Reconstruction Era. "Waving the bloody shirt" became an idiom in the South, attributed to rhetoric by Republican politicians such as Oliver Hazard Perry Morton in the Senate, who used emotional accounts of injustices done to Northern soldiers and carpetbaggers to bolster support for the Republicans' Reconstruction policies in South Carolina. The red shirt symbolism quickly spread. Suspects accused in the Hamburg Massacre wore red shirts as they marched on September 5 to their arraignment in Aiken, South Carolina. Martin Gary, the organizer in South Carolina of the Democratic campaign in 1876, mandated that his supporters were to wear red shirts at all party rallies and functions.

Wearing a red shirt became a source of pride and resistance to Republican rule for white Democrats in South Carolina. Women sewed red flannel shirts and made other garments of red. It also became fashionable for women to wear red ribbons in their hair or about their waists. Young men adopted the red shirts to express militancy after being too young to have fought in the Civil War.

== South Carolina Red Shirts ==
Local politicians and Civil War Veterans, like James B. Morrison, were Redshirts

State Democrats organized parades and rallies in every county of South Carolina. Many of the participants were armed and mounted; all wore red. Mounted men gave an impression of greater power and numbers. When Wade Hampton and other Democrats spoke, the Red Shirts would respond enthusiastically, shouting the campaign slogan "Hurrah for Hampton". This created a massive spectacle that united and motivated his followers.

Red Shirts sought to intimidate both white and black voters into voting for the Democrats or not at all. Their goal was to restore Democratic rule and white supremacy. The Red Shirts and similar groups were especially active in those states with an African American majority. They broke up Republican meetings, disrupted their organizing, and intimidated black voters at the polls. Many freedmen stopped voting from fear, and others voted for Democrats under pressure. The Red Shirts did not hesitate to use violence, nor did the other private militia groups. In the Piedmont counties of Aiken, Edgefield, and Barnwell, freedmen who voted were driven from their homes and whipped, while some of their leaders were murdered. During the 1876 presidential election, Democrats in Edgefield and Laurens counties voted "early and often", while freedmen were barred from the polls.

Armed and mounted Red Shirts accompanied Hampton on his tour of the state. They attended Republican meetings and would demand equal time, but they usually only stood in silence. At times, Red Shirts would hold a barbecue nearby to lure Republicans and try to convince them to vote for the Democratic ticket.

Hampton positioned himself as a statesman, promising support for education, and offering protection from violence that Governor Daniel Henry Chamberlain did not seem able to provide. Few freedmen voted for Hampton, and most remained loyal to the Republican Party of Abraham Lincoln. The 1876 campaign was the "most tumultuous in South Carolina's history". "An anti-Reconstruction historian later estimated that 150 Negroes were murdered in South Carolina during the campaign."

After the election on November 7, a protracted dispute between Chamberlain and Hampton ensued as both claimed victory. Because of the massive election fraud, Edmund William McGregor Mackey, a Republican member of the South Carolina House of Representatives, called upon the "Hunkidori Club" from Charleston to eject Democratic members from Edgefield and Laurens counties from the House. Word spread through the state. By December 3, approximately 5,000 Red Shirts assembled at the State House to defend the Democrats. Hampton appealed for calm and the Red Shirts dispersed.

As a result of a national political compromise, President Rutherford B. Hayes ordered the removal of the Union Army from the state on April 3, 1877. The white Democrats completed their political takeover of South Carolina. In the gubernatorial election of 1878, the Red Shirts made a nominal appearance as Hampton was re-elected without opposition. In the 1880s, local Redshirts like James B. Morrison won political office, further cementing democratic rule.

Future South Carolina Democratic politicians, such as Benjamin Tillman and Ellison D. Smith, proudly claimed their association in their youth with the Red Shirts as a bona fide for white supremacy.

== North Carolina Red Shirts ==
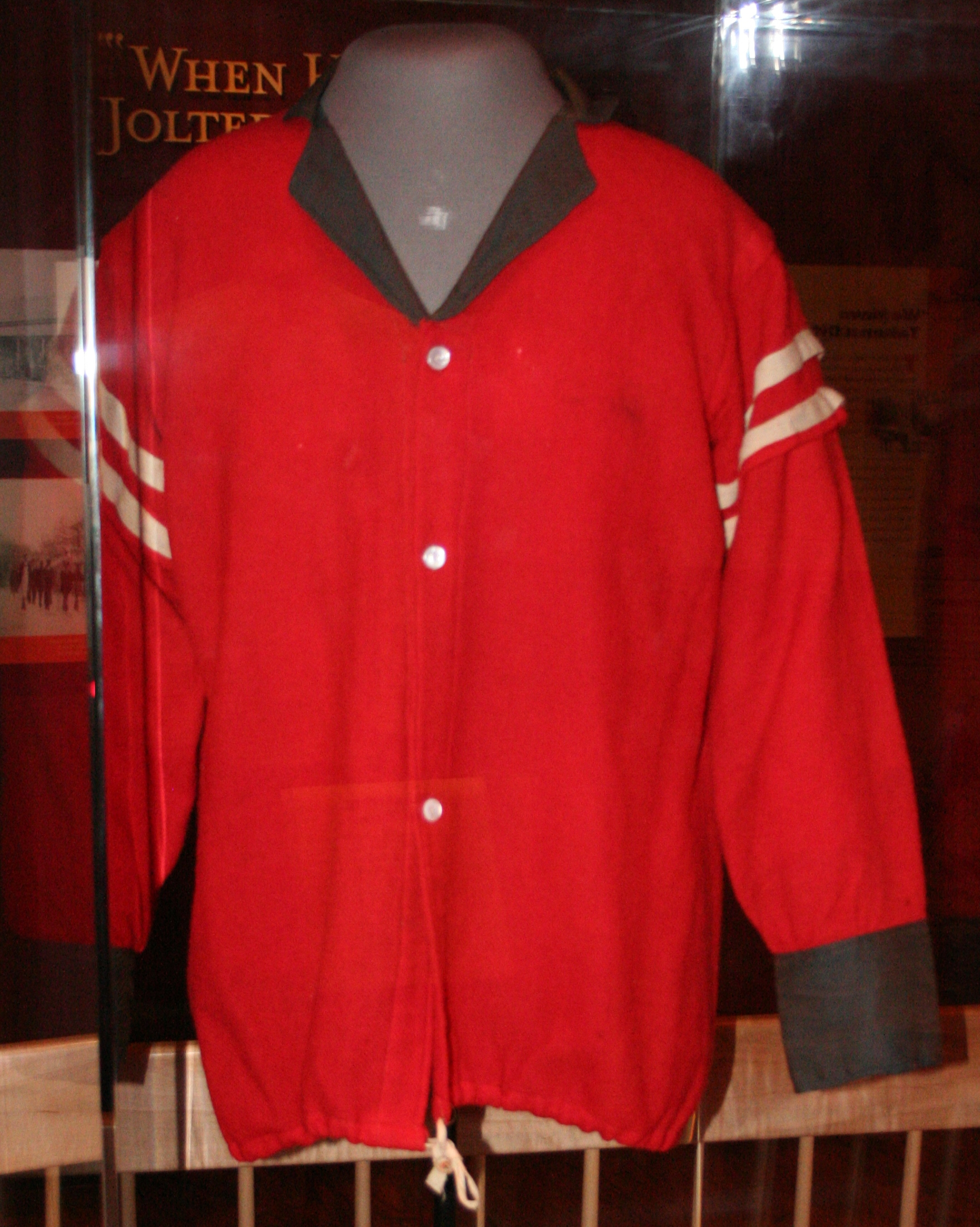
"Red Shirt" uniform displayed, at the North Carolina Museum of History, circa 1898–1900

Red Shirts were active again around the 1898 and 1900 elections, allied with the Democrats' appeals to voters to support white supremacy, in an effort to avoid voters moving to the Populist fusion candidate, as some had done in the 1896 gubernatorial election.

The Red Shirts were part of a Democratic campaign to oppose the interracial coalition of Republicans and Populists, dubbed Fusionists, which had gained control of the state legislature in the 1894 election and elected a Republican governor in 1896. Such biracial coalitions had also occurred in other states across the South, in some cases overturning or threatening white Democratic control of state legislatures. The majority of the White population feared the empowerment of Blacks made possible by Republican-Populist electoral fusion. To break up the coalition, white Democrats used intimidation and outright violence to reduce black Republican voting and regained control of the state legislature in 1898.

Intimidation and violence against blacks increased prior to the 1898 election throughout the state, especially in black-majority counties. On November 4, 1898, the Raleigh News & Observer noted,

The first Red Shirt parade on horseback ever witnessed in Wilmington electrified the people today. It created enthusiasm among the whites and consternation among the Negroes. The whole town turned out to see it. It was an enthusiastic body of men. Otherwise it was quiet and orderly.

At the time, Wilmington was the largest city in the state and majority-black in population.

In Wilmington, a biracial coalition of Republicans won the offices of mayor and aldermen in 1898. The mayor and two-thirds of the aldermen were white, elected from a black-majority city. But local white Democrats wanted power and took it six days after the election in the Wilmington massacre of 1898, the largest recognized coup d'état in United States history. After overthrowing the government, the mob attacked black areas of the city and killed numerous blacks, burning down houses, schools and churches. So many blacks left Wilmington permanently that the demographics changed, resulting in a white-majority city.

White Democrats controlling the state legislature drafted an amendment to the state constitution that disfranchised most African Americans and many poor whites by establishing requirements for poll taxes and literacy tests, which raised barriers to voter registration. In 1900, the amendment was adopted by a statewide popular referendum in which turnout of black voters was suppressed.

From 1896 to 1904, black voter turnout in North Carolina was reduced to near zero by the combination of such voter registration provisions together with more complicated rules for voting. This followed a pattern of similar state actions across the South, starting with the state of Mississippi's new constitution in 1890. After a generation of white supremacy, many people forgot that North Carolina once had thriving middle-class blacks.

=== Rise of the group ===
Due to the feelings of political devaluation among many white Democrats in North Carolina, the Democratic party and Red Shirts made it their goal to restore full and total power. The Red Shirts intimidated black voters by threat and outright attack, and practically eliminated the black vote in the state. Red Shirts were first spotted in North Carolina during the October 21, 1898, rally in Fayetteville. At this rally Benjamin Tillman, a prominent South Carolina Red Shirts leader, gave a speech that was followed by a plethora of Red Shirt activities in the state of North Carolina. The North Carolina Red Shirts were a conglomerate of all social classes, including teachers, farmers, merchants and some elite members of the Democratic Party. From that day on, Red Shirts chapters were particularly active in the southeastern part of North Carolina, including "New Hanover, Brunswick, Columbus, and Robeson counties", all of which geographically lie next to the South Carolina border and had large black populations.

Their early activities were part of initiating the white supremacy movements of 1898 and 1900. These arose in reaction to the increase in election of numerous local and state black government officials in the State of North Carolina between the years of 1894 and 1897. This increase in the number of black officials forced the "frightened and desperate Democratic Party" to initiate the white supremacy campaign in which the Red Shirts would become integral partners. Unlike the Ku Klux Klan, the Red Shirts collaborated only with the Democratic Party. They operated openly, as they wanted the North Carolina population and non-Democrats to know the identities of their members. By the end of the election in 1898, they proved to be a potent political force.

==== Election of 1898 ====
During the initial reign of Red Shirts terror, the senator of North Carolina, Sen. Jeter Pritchard (R), wrote to Pres. McKinley asking "Will you send deputy United States Marshal to preserve the peace?" The Red Shirts used the tactics of intimidation and sometimes violence to suppress voting by non-Democrats. With the rise in intimidation by the Red Shirts, both blacks and threatened whites were buying weaponry to protect themselves. Pritchard noted in his letter that the Red Shirts were most active "in counties where colored people predominate", and the paramilitary group targeted blacks.

Gov. Daniel L. Russell (R) said that along the southern edge of the state, "armed and lawless" men had taken over due to the increase in crimes and violent activities. The Red Shirts often disrupted many non-Democratic political meetings via "threats, intimidation, and actual violence". Through their intimidation, the Red Shirts successfully deterred many members of the counties from registering to vote in the 1898 state election. Due to the citizens being fearful to register, Gov. Russell issued a proclamation on October 26, 1898, asking all "Ill-disposed persons ... to immediately desist from all unlawful practices ... Turbulent conduct, and to preserve peace." Governor Russell's proclamation did not sit well with the Red Shirts; they increased their activity.

===== Before the election =====
The week before the 1898 election, the Red Shirts' activities were non-stop, and the threats were so recurrent that many Republicans and Fusionist speakers canceled their engagements; the entire Republican Fusion ticket withdrew in New Hanover County. A few days before the election on November 2, 1898, the Morning Star newspaper of Wilmington reported a large rally with the Red Shirt affiliate Claude Kitchin as the fiery speaker. The rally involved 1,000 men with red shirts who marched for 10 miles in the predominantly black areas of Richmond County, North Carolina. Their goal was "to show their determination to rid themselves of Negro rule". The paper reported that "many Negroes [had] taken their names from the registration list."

===== Election day =====
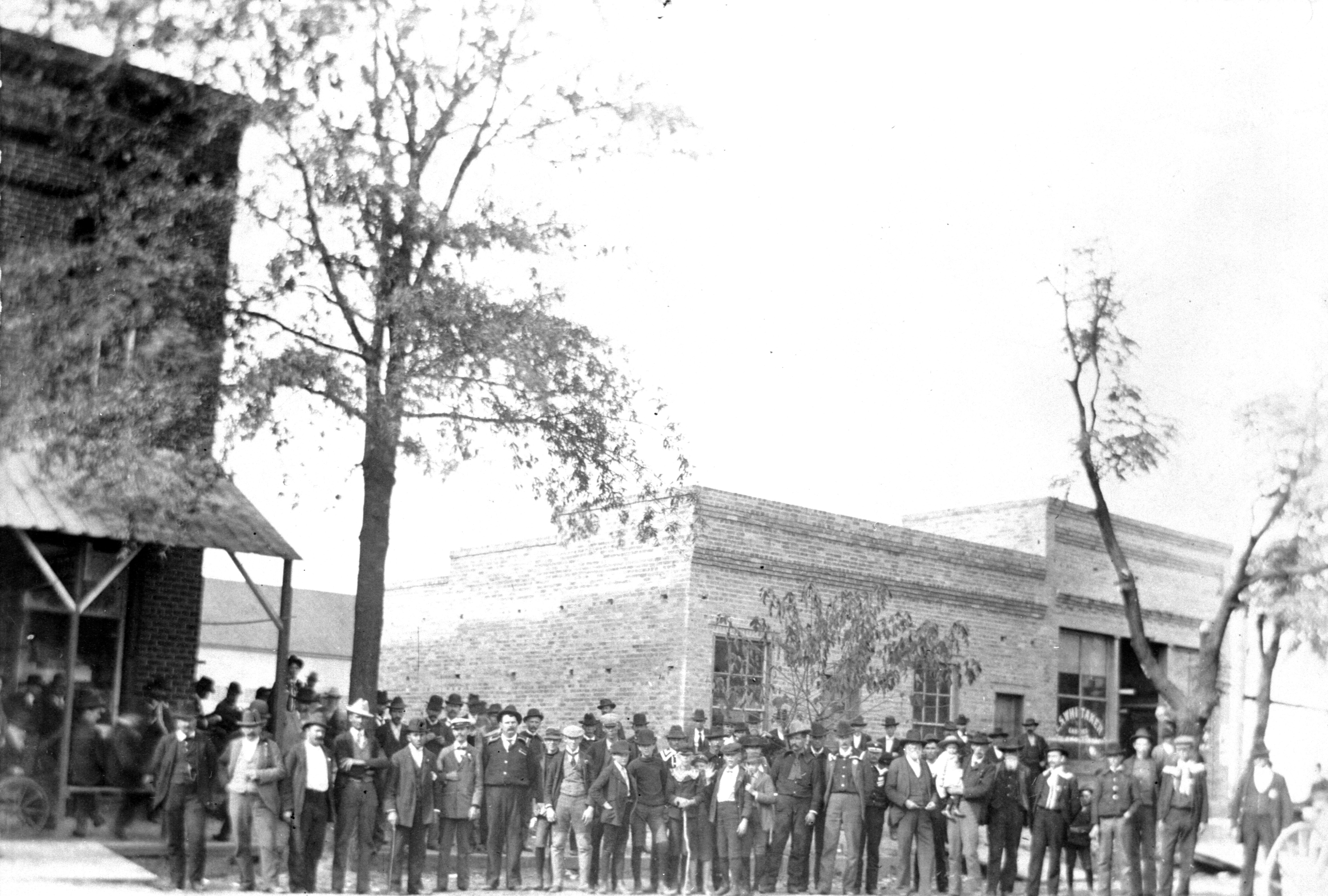
Red Shirts in Laurinburg on election day, 1898

During the November 8, 1898, election, Red Shirts enforced their previous activities by riding around the voting precincts on their horses, with rifles and shotguns ready, to deter all Republicans, Fusionists and African Americans from the polls. The Red Shirts' activity helped the Democrats win with a 25,000 majority, as headlined in the News and Observer. A large celebration on November 15 was organized by Josephus Daniels to commemorate "white supremacy and rescuing the state from Negro-rule".

==== Election of 1900 ====
===== Before the election =====
The election of 1900 was a special election because there was one held in August and another held in November. The white supremacy theme was repeated, with sayings such as "White Rule for TarHeels", "White Supremacy", and "No Negro Rule". The Red Shirts and Democrats would ensure their win during the August special election, which was a Democratic ploy to disfranchise the black vote. The Democrat and Red Shirts felt that if they could "demoralize black leaders", the black vote would decrease. On the day of the disfranchisement election in August, one prominent black leader, Abe Middleton, a former Republican county chairman of Duplin County, was symbolically "killed" when his wife found a "pasteboard coffin" in their garden. During a post-election hearing, Middleton testified that there was an increase in shooting near his home. Though the incidents did not faze Middleton, members of the black community saw this activity and refrained from voting. The intimidation activities of the Red Shirts were so successful that many African Americans abandoned their homes, some seeking refuge in swamps, as recounted by Dave Kennedy, a black voter of Duplin County.

The Red Shirts also continued to attack white Republicans and other opponents to the Democrats. The New York Times, in an August 2, 1900, article, noted that the day before the election, the Red Shirts disrupted the speech of Mr. Teague and demolished the platform on which he spoke. The Red Shirts were indirectly supported by many law enforcement officials, who failed to take action against them in most counties throughout the state. Later, as Teague was traveling to Dunn County, during his canvassing tour of the state, he was kidnapped by the Red Shirts and driven out of town. Among other prominent non-Democratic speakers, Marion Butler and others were disrupted by the throwing of rotten eggs. Due to the increasingly disruptive activities of the Red Shirts, the Republican Party chairman of Johnson County sent a request for troops to Gov. Russell.

===== Election day =====
On the day of the 1900 election, the Red Shirts were even more obvious than in 1898. They rode around the voting polls with their guns and horses, intimidating blacks and other Republicans. The success of the disfranchisement of black votes in the August 1900 election, ultimately resulted in the November Democratic gubernatorial win of Charles Brantley Aycock over Adams, the Republican. The vote of 186,650 to 126,296 was noted as "the largest majority ever given to a gubernatorial candidate".

After the Democratic win in November, the Red Shirts disappeared from public view. Because their members were primarily poor whites, the Democratic Party of elitist whites parted ways with the group. Thus the prevalence of Red Shirts declined upon the inauguration of Governor Aycock.

== Contemporary Red Shirts ==
The League of the South of South Carolina has a specialized membership category known as "Red Shirts". The Red Shirts have organized demonstrations in support of the Confederate flag, against the establishment of Martin Luther King Jr. Day, and against politicians they regard as "scalawags" and "carpetbaggers" such as Lindsey Graham, Bob Inglis, John McCain, and attorney Morris Dees. They supported the congressional candidacy of the far-right libertarian John Cobin against the more moderate Inglis and conducted mock trials of Abraham Lincoln and William Tecumseh Sherman.

According to their membership application form, Red Shirt goals include conservative ideals such as implementing "God's laws as the acceptable standard of behavior"; eliminating all federal "control and influence in South Carolina"; reducing the size and scope of government at all levels; and promoting and instituting "Southern culture relying on Biblical truth".

In September 2023, the neo-Nazi groups Blood Tribe and Goyim Defense League held a large march near Disney World in Orlando, Florida called the March of the Red Shirts. In February 2024, the group held a much less successful march in Nashville, Tennessee that quickly dispersed.

== See also ==
Media related to Red Shirts at Wikimedia Commons

- 1876 South Carolina gubernatorial election
- History of South Carolina
- History of the Southern United States
- Reconstruction era of the United States
- List of Ku Klux Klan organizations. Reconstruction Era paramilitaries
