= 1886 United States House of Representatives elections in South Carolina =

The 1886 United States House of Representatives elections in South Carolina were held on November 2, 1886, to select seven Representatives for one two-year terms from the state of South Carolina. Five incumbents were re-elected, the Republican incumbent was defeated, and the open seat was retained by the Democrats. The composition of the state delegation after the election was solely Democratic.

== 1st congressional district ==
Incumbent Democratic Congressman Samuel Dibble of the 1st congressional district, in office since 1883, was unopposed in his bid for re-election.

=== General election results ===
South Carolina's 1st congressional district election results, 1886
Party	Candidate	Votes	%	±%
Democratic	Samuel Dibble (incumbent)	3,315	99.9	+26.4
No party	Write-Ins	2	0.1	+0.1
Majority		3,313	99.8	+52.8
Turnout		3,317		
Democratic hold				

== 2nd congressional district ==
Incumbent Democratic Congressman George D. Tillman of the 2nd congressional district, in office since 1883, was unopposed in his bid for re-election.

=== General election results ===
South Carolina's 2nd congressional district election results, 1886
Party	Candidate	Votes	%	±%
Democratic	George D. Tillman (incumbent)	5,212	99.6	+15.2
No party	Write-Ins	23	0.4	−1.0
Majority		5,189	99.2	+29.0
Turnout		5,235		
Democratic hold				

== 3rd congressional district ==
Incumbent Democratic Congressman D. Wyatt Aiken of the 3rd congressional district, in office since 1877, opted to retire. James S. Cothran was nominated by the Democrats and was unopposed in his bid for election.

=== General election results ===
South Carolina's 3rd congressional district election results, 1886
Party	Candidate	Votes	%	±%
Democratic	James S. Cothran	4,402	99.8	+6.3
No party	Write-Ins	7	0.2	+0.2
Majority		4,395	99.6	+12.6
Turnout		4,409		
Democratic hold				

== 4th congressional district ==
Incumbent Democratic Congressman William H. Perry of the 4th congressional district, in office since 1885, was unopposed in his bid for re-election.

=== General election results ===
South Carolina's 4th congressional district election results, 1886
Party	Candidate	Votes	%	±%
Democratic	William H. Perry (incumbent)	4,470	100.0	+0.6
Majority		4,470	100.0	+1.2
Turnout		4,470		
Democratic hold				

== 5th congressional district ==
Incumbent Democratic Congressman John J. Hemphill of the 5th congressional district, in office since 1883, won the Democratic primary and was unopposed in the general election.

=== Democratic primary ===
Democratic primary
Candidate	Votes	%
John J. Hemphill	3,539	62.0
M.J. Hough	880	15.4
W.D. Trantham	759	13.3
E.M. Law	527	9.3

=== General election results ===
South Carolina's 5th congressional district election results, 1886
Party	Candidate	Votes	%	±%
Democratic	John J. Hemphill (incumbent)	4,696	99.9	+25.4
No party	Write-Ins	5	0.1	−3.6
Majority		4,691	99.8	+47.1
Turnout		4,701		
Democratic hold				

== 6th congressional district ==
Incumbent Democratic Congressman George W. Dargan of the 6th congressional district, in office since 1883, was unopposed in his bid for re-election.

=== General election results ===
South Carolina's 6th congressional district election results, 1886
Party	Candidate	Votes	%	±%
Democratic	George W. Dargan (incumbent)	4,411	98.7	+24.7
No party	Write-Ins	58	1.3	−1.4
Majority		4,353	97.4	+46.7
Turnout		4,469		
Democratic hold				

== 7th congressional district ==
Incumbent Republican Congressman Robert Smalls of the 7th congressional district, in office since 1884, was defeated by Democratic challenger William Elliott.

=== General election results ===
South Carolina's 7th congressional district election results, 1886
Party	Candidate	Votes	%	±%
Democratic	William Elliott	6,493	52.0	+17.4
Republican	Robert Smalls (incumbent)	5,961	47.8	−15.8
No party	Write-Ins	22	0.2	−1.6
Majority		532	4.2	−24.8
Turnout		12,476		
Democratic gain from Republican				

== See also ==
- United States House of Representatives elections, 1886
- South Carolina gubernatorial election, 1886
- South Carolina's congressional districts
