= 1882 United States House of Representatives elections in South Carolina =

The 1882 United States House of Representatives elections in South Carolina were held on November 7, 1882, to select seven Representatives for two-year terms from the state of South Carolina. Following the 1880 census, the state was granted two additional seats in the House of Representatives. The Democratic controlled state legislature drew the districts to maximize the white vote and limit the black vote. Much of the black population was packed into the 7th congressional district which resulted in the other six congressional districts being evenly split between the races. The Democratic plan achieved its desired effect and the composition of the state delegation after the election was six Democrats and one Republican.

== 1st congressional district ==
The 1st congressional district shifted from the Pee Dee region to the central part of the state and it also included the city of Charleston. Samuel Dibble was nominated by the Democrats and defeated J.B. Campbell, a fusion candidate of the Greenback-Labor and Republican parties.

=== General election results ===
South Carolina's 1st congressional district election results, 1882
Party	Candidate	Votes	%	±%
Democratic	Samuel Dibble	8,674	56.9	−6.4
Greenback-Labor	J.B. Campbell	6,565	43.1	+6.4
Majority		2,109	13.8	−12.8
Turnout		15,239		
Democratic hold				

== 2nd congressional district ==
The 2nd congressional district shifted from Charleston to the lower western counties of the state. George D. Tillman, the former Democratic Representative of the 5th congressional district, defeated E.M. Brayton, a fusion candidate of the Greenback-Labor and Republican parties.

=== General election results ===
South Carolina's 2nd congressional district election results, 1882
Party	Candidate	Votes	%	±%
Democratic	George D. Tillman	11,388	67.8	+9.0
Greenback-Labor	E.M. Brayton	5,361	31.9	-9.3
No party	Write-Ins	59	0.3	+0.3
Majority		6,027	35.9	+18.3
Turnout		16,808		
Democratic gain from Republican				

== 3rd congressional district ==
The 3rd congressional district remained in the northwest part of the state and incumbent Democratic Congressman D. Wyatt Aiken, in office since 1877, defeated T.H. Russell, a fusion candidate of the Greenback-Labor and Republican parties.

=== General election results ===
South Carolina's 3rd congressional district election results, 1882
Party	Candidate	Votes	%	±%
Democratic	D. Wyatt Aiken (incumbent)	9,245	84.6	+10.5
Greenback-Labor	T.H. Russell	1,677	15.4	-10.5
Majority		7,568	69.2	−21.0
Turnout		10,922		
Democratic hold				

== 4th congressional district ==
The 4th congressional district remained in the Greenville-Spartanburg region of the state and incumbent Democratic Congressman John H. Evins, in office since 1877, defeated D.R. Elkins, a fusion candidate of the Greenback-Labor and Republican parties.

=== General election results ===
South Carolina's 4th congressional district election results, 1882
Party	Candidate	Votes	%	±%
Democratic	John H. Evins (incumbent)	11,662	71.8	+2.1
Greenback-Labor	D.R. Elkins	4,588	28.2	-2.1
Majority		7,074	43.4	+3.0
Turnout		23,324		
Democratic hold				

== 5th congressional district ==
The 5th congressional district shifted from the southwestern part of the state to the northern central part of the state. John J. Hemphill was nominated by the Democrats and defeated E.B.C. Cash, a fusion candidate of the Greenback-Labor and Republican parties.

=== General election results ===
South Carolina's 5th congressional district election results, 1882
Party	Candidate	Votes	%	±%
Democratic	John J. Hemphill	9,518	56.0	−4.4
Greenback-Labor	E.B.C. Cash	7,471	44.0	+4.4
Majority		2,047	12.0	−8.8
Turnout		16,989		
Democratic gain from Republican				

== 6th congressional district ==
The 6th congressional district was created to cover the Pee Dee region of the state. George W. Dargan was nominated by the Democrats and defeated the Greenback-Labor and Republican candidates in the general election.

=== General election results ===
South Carolina's 6th congressional district election results, 1882
Party	Candidate	Votes	%	±%
Democratic	George W. Dargan	10,814	64.7	N/A
Republican	Edmund H. Deas	3,628	21.7	N/A
Greenback-Labor	A.H. Bowen	2,263	13.6	N/A
Majority		7,186	43.0	N/A
Turnout		16,705		
Democratic gain				

== 7th congressional district ==
The 7th congressional district became known as the black district because it was gerrymandered in such a way to include the great bulk of the black population. Republican Edmund William McGregor Mackey defeated Independent Republican challenger Samuel Lee in the general election.

=== General election results ===
South Carolina's 7th congressional district election results, 1882
Party	Candidate	Votes	%	±%
Republican	Edmund W.M. Mackey	18,469	64.8	N/A
Independent Republican	Samuel Lee	10,017	35.2	N/A
Majority		8,452	29.6	N/A
Turnout		28,486		
Republican gain				

== See also ==
- United States House of Representatives elections, 1882
- South Carolina gubernatorial election, 1882
- South Carolina's congressional districts
