= Sherman Smalls =

State legislator in South Carolina

Sherman Smalls (c. 1843 - ?) was a carpenter and state legislator in South Carolina. He represented Colleton County, South Carolina in the South Carolina House of Representatives from 1870 to 1874.

He was born in South Carolina. He was a witness for Robert Smalls in his contesting of G. D. Tillman's election to the U.S. Congress.

He admitted to being paid $300 by John J. Patterson to vote to pass the Blue Ridge Scrip bill over the Governors veto.

== See also ==
- African American officeholders from the end of the Civil War until before 1900
