= Masonic Landmarks =

Set of principles that Freemasons claim

Masonic landmarks are a set of principles that many Freemasons claim to be ancient and unchangeable precepts of Masonry. Issues of the "regularity" of a Freemasonic Lodge, Grand Lodge or Grand Orient are judged in the context of the landmarks. Because each Grand Lodge is self-governing, with no single body exercising authority over the whole of Freemasonry, the interpretations of these principles can and do vary, leading to controversies of recognition. Different Masonic jurisdictions have different landmarks.

== Origins ==
According to Percy Jantz, the Masonic term landmark has biblical origins. He cites the Book of Proverbs 22:28: "Remove not the ancient landmark which thy fathers have set", referring to stone pillars set to mark boundaries of land. He further quotes a Jewish law: "Thou shalt not remove thy neighbors' landmark, which they of old time have set in thine inheritance" to emphasize how these Landmarks designate inheritance.

Albert Mackey Expands on the above historical significance of landmarks: "The universal language and the universal laws of masonry are landmarks, but not so are the local ceremonies, laws, and usages, which vary in different countries. To attempt to alter or remove these sacred landmarks...is one of the most heinous offences that a Mason can commit.

Mark Tabbert believes that the actual rules and regulations laid down in the early masonic landmarks derive from the charges of medieval stonemasons.

== History ==
According to the General Regulations published by the Premier Grand Lodge of England in 1723 "Every Annual Grand Lodge has an inherent power and Authority to make new Regulations or to alter these, for the real benefits of this Ancient Fraternity; provided always that the old Land-Marks be carefully preserved." However, these landmarks were not defined in any manner. In 1844, George Oliver wrote that some jurisdictions restrict the definition of a Masonic landmark to be only the "signs, tokens and words" while others include the ceremonies of initiation, passing, and raising of a candidate. Some also include the ornaments, furniture, and jewels of a Lodge, or their characteristic symbols. In 1863, Oliver published the Freemason's Treasury in which he listed 40 landmarks. Mackey expanded on both of these lists and remarked that the safest method of defining the landmarks is "those ancient, and therefore universal, customs of the order, which either gradually grew into operation as rules of action, or, if at once enacted by any competent authority, were enacted at a period so remote, that no account of their origin is to be found in the records of history."

=== Mackey's 25 Landmarks ===
The first major attempt to define the landmarks of Freemasonry was in 1858, when Albert Mackey (1807–1881) defined 25 landmarks in total:

1. The fraternal modes of recognition
2. The division of Masonry into 3 symbolic degrees
3. The symbolic legend of Hiram Abiff
4. The government of the fraternity by a Grand Master
5. The prerogative of the Grand Master to preside over every assembly of the craft
6. The prerogative of the Grand Master to issue dispensations for conferring degrees at irregular times
7. The prerogative of the Grand Master to issue dispensations for opening and holding Lodges otherwise not established
8. The prerogative of the Grand Master to make Masons at Sight
9. The necessity for Masons to congregate in Lodges
10. The government of Lodges to be by a Master and two Wardens
11. The necessity that every Lodge when congregated be duly tiled
12. The right of every Mason to be represented in all general meetings of the Craft
13. The right of every Mason to appeal from his Lodge's decisions to the Grand Lodge
14. The right of every Mason to sit in every regular Lodge
15. That no unknown visitor be allowed to sit in Lodge without being examined and found to be a Freemason
16. That no Lodge can interfere in the business of another Lodge
17. That every Freemason be amenable to the laws and regulations of the Jurisdiction in which he resides
18. That candidates for Freemasonry be required to meet certain qualifications; namely: being a man, of mature age, not a cripple, and free born.
19. That a belief in the existence of God be a requirement for membership
20. That belief in a resurrection to a future life be a requirement for membership
21. That a "Book of the Law" shall constitute an indispensable part of the furniture of every Lodge
22. The equality of Masons
23. The secrecy of the Institution
24. The foundation of a speculative science upon an operative art, and the symbolic use and explanation of the terms of that art for purposes of moral teaching
25. That none of these landmarks can be changed.

=== Pound's Seven Landmarks ===
In 1911, understanding Mackey's 25 points to be a summary of Masonic "common law", the legal scholar Roscoe Pound (1870–1964) distinguished seven of them as landmarks:

1. Belief in a Supreme Being (19)
2. Belief in immortality (20)
3. That a "book of sacred law" is an indispensable part of the "furniture" (or furnishings) of the Lodge (21)
4. The legend of the Third Degree (3)
5. Secrecy (not specifying as to what) (11, 23)
6. Symbolism of operative masonry (24)
7. That a Mason must be a man, freeborn, and of lawful age (18)

== Modern Interpretations ==
In the last century, several American Grand Lodges attempted to enumerate the landmarks, ranging from West Virginia (7) and New Jersey (10) to Nevada (39) and Kentucky (54).

In the 1950s the Commission on Information for Recognition of the Conference of Grand Masters of Masons in North America upheld three "ancient landmarks":

1. Monotheism — An unalterable and continuing belief in God.
2. The Volume of The Sacred Law — an essential part of the furniture of the Lodge.
3. Prohibition of the discussion of Religion and Politics (within the lodge).

== Quotations ==
The first great duty, not only of every lodge, but of every Mason, is to see that the landmarks of the Order shall never be impaired.

— Albert Mackey (1856), The Principles of Masonic Law
