= Waldrop =

People with the surname Waldrop include:

- Howard Waldrop (born 1946), American science fiction writer
- Jim Waldrop, American baseball coach
- James Leonard Waldrop (1955–1986), American actor and model
- Keith Waldrop (1932–2023), American poet, author, and translator; husband of Rosmarie Waldrop
- Kyle Waldrop (born 1985), American baseball pitcher
- Kyle Waldrop (outfielder) (born 1991), American baseball outfielder
- Lacey Waldrop (born 1993), American softball coach and player
- Manse Waldrop (died 1887), American rapist and lynching victim
- Mark Waldrop, American musician
- Michael Waldrop (born 1961), American musician
- Rob Waldrop (born 1971), American football defensive tackle
- Rosmarie Waldrop (born 1935), American poet, translator, and publisher
- Tony Waldrop (1951–2022), American middle distance runner
