= Charles W. Buttz =

American politician

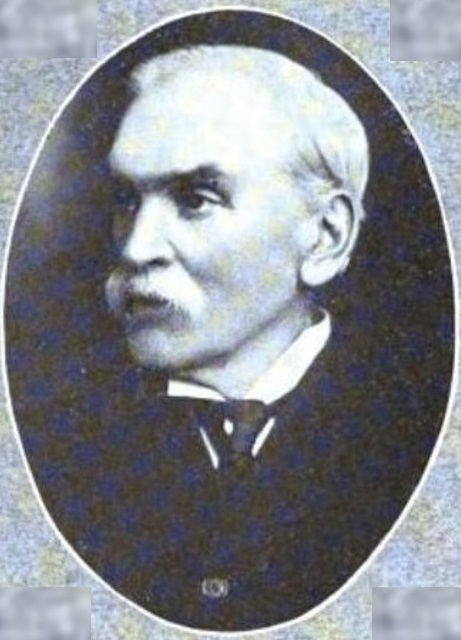
- From the February 1907 issue of North Dakota Magazine

Member of the U.S. House of Representatives from South Carolina's 2nd district
- In office November 7, 1876 – March 3, 1877
- Preceded by: Edmund W.M. Mackey
- Succeeded by: Richard H. Cain

Member of the North Dakota House of Representatives from the 14th District
- In office January 6, 1903 – January 5, 1909

Personal details
- Born: November 16, 1837 Stroudsburg, Pennsylvania, U.S.
- Died: July 20, 1913 (aged 75) Lisbon, North Dakota, U.S.
- Party: Republican
- Profession: Lawyer, politician, farmer

Military service
- Allegiance: United States of America
- Branch/service: Union Army
- Years of service: 1861–1863
- Rank: First Lieutenant; Brevet Major
- Battles/wars: American Civil War

Charles Wilson Buttz (November 16, 1837 – July 20, 1913) was an American lawyer who served as U.S. representative from South Carolina.

== Early life ==
Born in Stroudsburg, Pennsylvania, Buttz moved with his parents to White Township, New Jersey, in 1839. He went on to study law in Belvidere, New Jersey, and was admitted to the bar in 1863. He practiced law in Norfolk, Virginia and went on to serve as solicitor of the first judicial circuit between 1872 and 1880. Buttz joined the Union Army in 1861 as a second lieutenant in the Eleventh Pennsylvania Cavalry, gaining a promotion to first lieutenant in 1862. He was wounded in 1863, and in October of that year, resigned his commission on account of impaired health. He received two brevet ranks from the President, one as captain and the other as major, both dating from May 1865. He was appointed director of the Exchange Bank of Virginia in 1864 and then Commonwealth attorney for King William County in 1866. He moved to Charleston, South Carolina, in 1870.

== Political career ==
He served as delegate to the Republican National Convention in 1864. In 1875, he contested as a Republican the election of Edmund W. M. Mackey to the Forty-fourth Congress, but the House decided that neither was entitled to the seat. Buttz was subsequently elected to fill the vacancy caused by the decision of the House and served from November 7, 1876, to March 3, 1877. He was not a candidate for renomination in 1876.

== North Dakota ==
He moved to Fargo, North Dakota, in 1878 and became a bonanza farmer. He obtained the official organization of Ransom County in 1882, and served as state's attorney 1884–1886. He served as a member of the North Dakota House of Representatives from 1903 to 1909.

He died in Lisbon, North Dakota, on July 20, 1913, and was interred in Oakwood Cemetery.

U.S. House of Representatives
| Preceded by Edmund W.M. Mackey | Member of the U.S. House of Representatives from South Carolina's 2nd congressional district 1876–1877 | Succeeded by Richard H. Cain |
