= W. Jasper Talbert =

American politician (1846–1931)

William Jasper Talbert
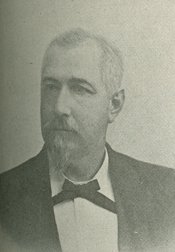

Member of the U.S. House of Representatives from South Carolina's 2nd district
- In office March 4, 1893 – March 3, 1903
- Preceded by: George D. Tillman
- Succeeded by: George W. Croft

Member of the South Carolina Senate from Edgefield County
- In office November 25, 1884 – December 24, 1887
- Preceded by: James Callison
- Succeeded by: William Judson Ready

Member of the South Carolina House of Representatives from Edgefield County
- In office November 23, 1880 – December 24, 1883

Mayor of Parksville, South Carolina
- In office 1895–1900

Personal details
- Born: October 6, 1846 Edgefield, South Carolina
- Died: February 5, 1931 (aged 84) Greenwood, South Carolina
- Resting place: Parksville, South Carolina
- Party: Democratic
- Education: Erskine College
- Profession: farmer, politician

Military service
- Allegiance: Confederate States of America
- Branch/service: Confederate States Army
- Years of service: 1864–1865
- Rank: Private
- Unit: (South Carolina) Hampton's Legion
- Battles/wars: American Civil War

William Jasper Talbert (October 6, 1846 – February 5, 1931) was a U.S. representative from South Carolina.

== Early life ==
Born near Edgefield County, South Carolina, in Talbert Township in what is now Mccormick County, South Carolina. He attended the common schools in Greenwood then Due West Academy at Abbeville, and graduated from Erskine College in Due West, South Carolina. He served as a substitute in the Confederate States Army as a private in Company F, Fifth South Carolina Reserves; in place of his father B. M. Talbert, who was discharged December 17, 1862. He reenlisted at Richmond, Virginia, September 15, 1864, as a private in Company B, Infantry Regiment, Hampton Legion of South Carolina. After the war, he engaged in agricultural pursuits near Parksville in McCormick County, South Carolina.

== Political career ==
He served as member of the State House of Representatives from 1880 to 1883, and in the State Senate from 1884 to 1888. He was appointed as superintendent of the State penitentiary and served from 1891 to 1893. He served as delegate to the Democratic National Convention in 1892. He served as mayor of Parksville 1895–1900. He was president of the Democratic State convention in 1899. Throughout this period, he held various positions in the Farmers' Alliance.

Talbert was elected as a Democrat to the Fifty-third and to the four succeeding Congresses (March 4, 1893 – March 3, 1903). He was not a candidate for renomination in 1902, but was an unsuccessful candidate in the second primary for the Democratic nomination for governor in 1902.

== Later life ==
He resumed agricultural pursuits near Parksville, McCormick County, South Carolina. He moved to McCormick, South Carolina, in 1927, and lived in retirement until his death in Greenwood, South Carolina, February 5, 1931. He was interred in Parksville Baptist Church Cemetery.

== Sources ==
- United States Congress. "W. Jasper Talbert (id: T000016)". Biographical Directory of the United States Congress.

U.S. House of Representatives
Preceded by George D. Tillman	Member of the U.S. House of Representatives from South Carolina's 2nd congressional district 1893–1903	Succeeded by George W. Croft
