= Mason at sight =

Qualification in Freemasonry

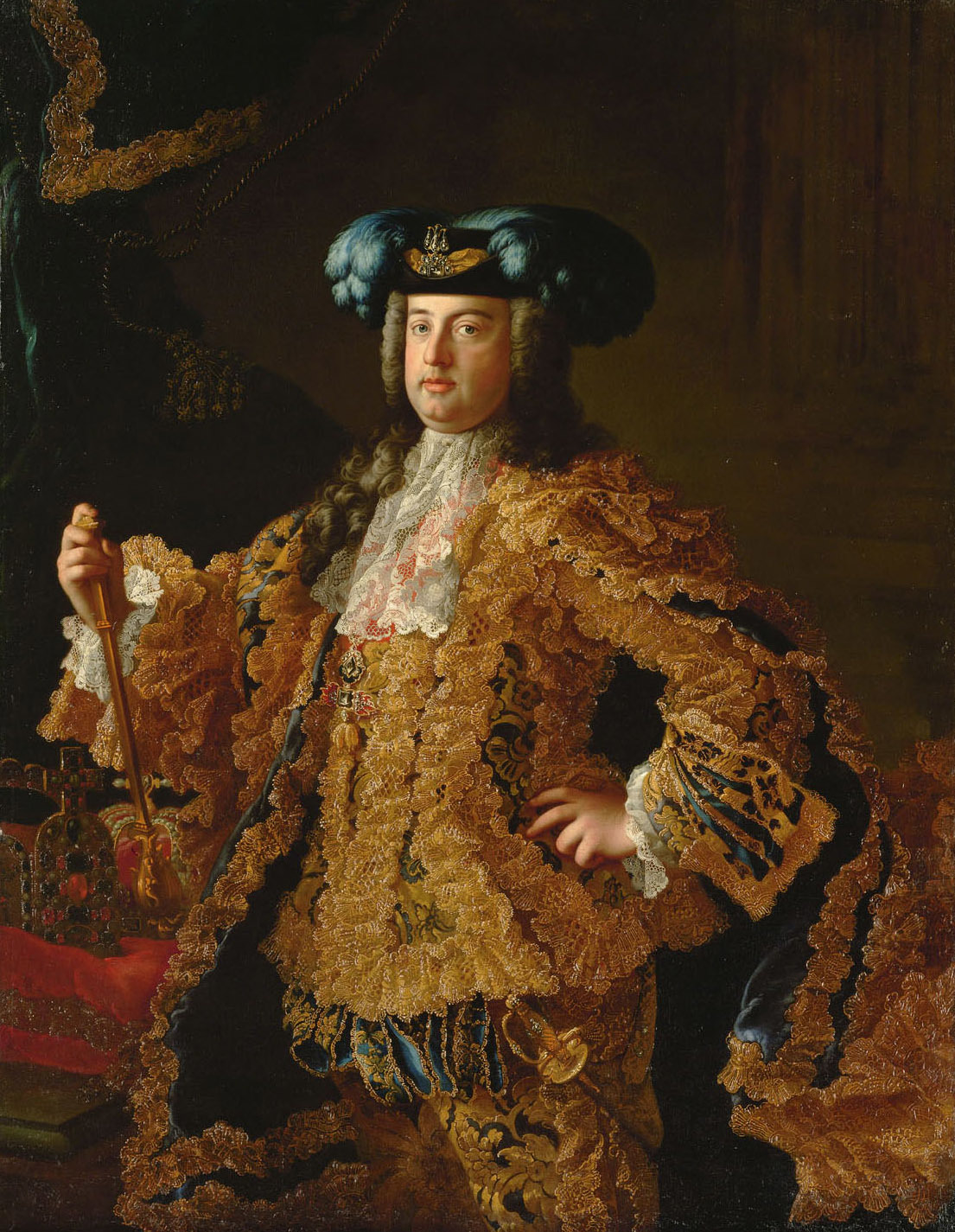
The Holy Roman Emperor Francis I (pictured) was one of the earliest recorded persons to be recognized as a Mason at sight.

In Freemasonry, a Mason at sight, or Mason on sight, is a non-Mason who has been initiated into Freemasonry and raised to the degree of Master Mason through a special application of the power of a Grand Master.

== Procedure ==
The process of making a Mason at sight was listed by Albert Mackey as the eighth of his "Twenty-Five Landmarks of Freemasonry".

The customary method for raising a person to Master Mason through the rare process of recognizing him a Mason at sight has the Grand Master creating a new lodge for the single purpose of initiating the candidate. This "occasional lodge" is then dissolved when the reason for its creation - the initiation of the candidate - has been completed. However, while the process of recognizing a Mason at sight usually involves this procedure, Masonic historian Louis L. Williams has observed that "using his unique and unquestionable power, the Grand Master could pretty well proceed as he might see fit" such as simply decreeing the individual to be a Master Mason.

== Masons at sight ==
=== United Kingdom ===
Early instances in the history of speculative Masonry, in which a man has been made a Mason at sight, include the raising of Francis Stephen, Duke of Lorraine, in 1731 at Houghton Hall, fourteen years before his accession as Holy Roman Emperor, and of Frederick, Prince of Wales in 1737.

=== United States ===
Joseph Smith, founder of the LDS Church, was raised at sight in March of 1842, completing the three degrees of Freemasonry within the atypically short timespan of two days.

Other notable persons in the United States who have been made a Mason at sight include General Douglas MacArthur on January 17, 1936, in the presence of over six hundred Master Masons, General George C. Marshall, who was raised by the Grand Master of the Grand Lodge of the District of Columbia in December 1941, and Don King, who was raised by Grand Master Odes J. Kyle Jr. of the Most Worshipful Prince Hall Grand Lodge of Ohio in 1987.

==== United States Presidents ====
William Howard Taft was recognized as a Mason at sight by an occasional lodge created for that purpose on February 18, 1909, a few weeks prior to his inauguration as the 27th President of the United States. The lodge was convened at about 4:00 p.m. at the Scottish Rite Cathedral in Cincinnati by Charles Hoskinson, the Grand Master of Ohio, and consisted of him and William B. Mellish. He dissolved it after 6:00 p.m.

Joe Biden was declared a Master Mason at sight by the Prince Hall Grand Lodge of South Carolina on January 19, 2025. The Pillar, however, have noted that "Biden would have to himself accept, even passively by not rejecting the designation, the conferred membership — the masons don’t have the power to make someone a member without consent, anymore than one person can marry another without their consent." They further question if this actually occurred, casting some doubt on his Masonic membership. Others have raised questions of Biden's legitimacy as a Master Mason given that the Prince Hall Grand Lodge of South Carolina "is not recognized as regular by any so-called mainstream U.S. grand lodge, the United Grand Lodge of England, or any other major regular, recognized Masonic jurisdiction."
