= Fort Robert Smalls =

Coordinates: 40°24′53″N 79°57′38″W

- Pittsburgh, Pennsylvania in United States

Site information
- Type: American Civil War redoubt
- Controlled by: Union Army

Site history
- Built: 1863

Fort Robert Smalls was a Civil War redoubt built by free blacks for the defense of Pittsburgh in 1863.

It was named in honor of Robert Smalls, a man who escaped from slavery in Beaufort, South Carolina with his crew and their families by seizing a Confederate transport ship and piloting it to the safety of a Union blockade around the harbor of Charleston, South Carolina in 1862.

== History ==
According to historic preservationist Eliza Smith Brown, during the American Civil War, civic leaders in Pittsburgh ordered the construction of defensive structures, including forts and redoubts, in response to the threatened invasion of Pennsylvania by Confederate troops in 1863. Fort Robert Smalls was one of two of those installations which were known to have been built by black workers on McGuire's Hill.

It was named for Robert Smalls, a slave who commandeered a Confederate transport, the CSS Planter, and brought his family and others to freedom in the north. Its "four-to-five-foot-high earthen embankments" survived at the top of McGuire's Hill at the mouth of Becks Run in Arlington Heights until their 1930 destruction to make way for public housing.
