= Michael P. O'Connor (politician) =

American politician

Michael P. O’Connor
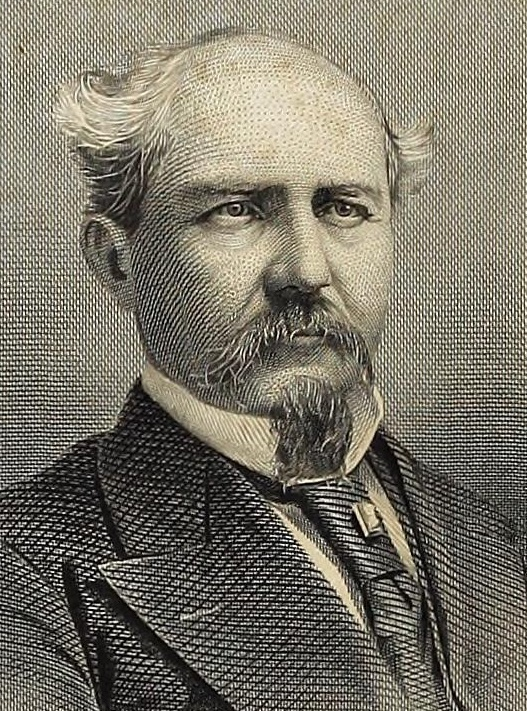
- Frontispiece of 1882's Memorial Addresses on the Life and Character of Michael P. O'Connor, a Representative from South Carolina

Member of the U.S. House of Representatives from South Carolina's 2nd district
- In office March 4, 1879 – April 26, 1881
- Preceded by: Richard H. Cain
- Succeeded by: Edmund W.M. Mackey

Member of the South Carolina House of Representatives from St. Philip's and St. Michael's Parish
- In office November 22, 1858 – December 23, 1864

Personal details
- Born: Michael Patrick O'Connor; September 29, 1831 Beaufort, South Carolina, US
- Died: April 26, 1881 (aged 49) Charleston, South Carolina, US
- Resting place: St. Lawrence Cemetery
- Party: Democratic
- Education: St. John's College
- Profession: Attorney, politician

Military service
- Allegiance: Confederate States of America
- Branch/service: Confederate States Army
- Years of service: 1861–1865
- Rank: Lieutenant
- Battles/wars: American Civil War

Michael Patrick O'Connor (September 29, 1831 – April 26, 1881) was an American lawyer, politician and Confederate Civil War veteran who served one term as a U.S. representative from South Carolina from 1879 to 1881.

== Early life ==
Born in Beaufort, South Carolina, O'Connor attended the public schools and was graduated from St. John's College, Fordham, New York, in 1850. He studied law, was admitted to the bar in 1854 and commenced practice in Charleston, South Carolina.

=== Civil War ===
During the Civil War, he served in the Confederate military as a lieutenant in the Lafayette Light Artillery.

== Political career ==
He served as member of the South Carolina House of Representatives from 1858 to 1866. He argued against secession in the state house of representatives.

He served as delegate to the Democratic National Conventions in 1872 and 1876.

=== Congress ===
He was an unsuccessful candidate for election in 1874 to the Forty-fourth and in 1876 to the Forty-fifth Congresses, but was elected as a Democrat to the Forty-sixth Congress, serving from March 4, 1879 to March 3, 1881.

== Death and burial ==
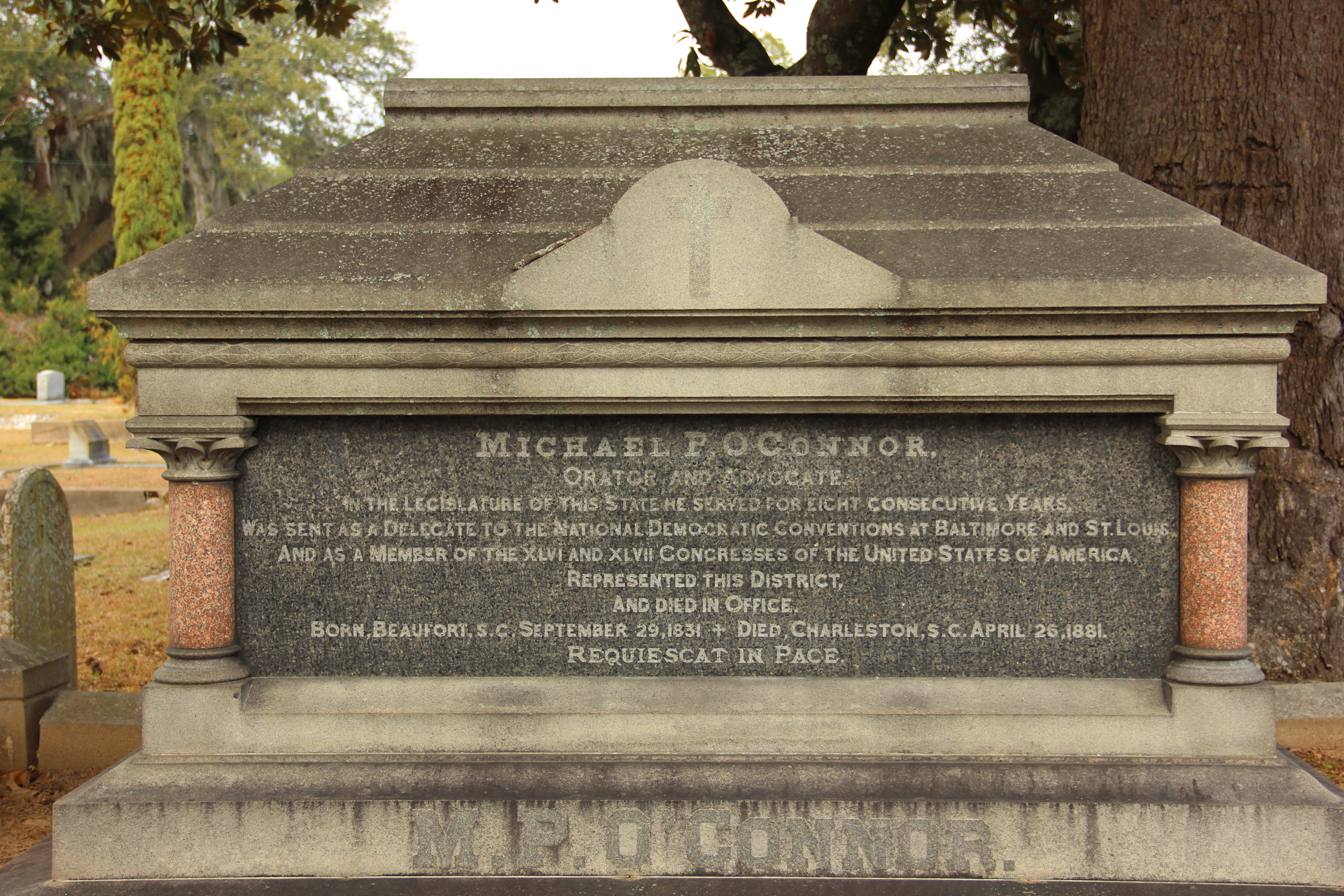
O'Connor was buried in St. Lawrence Cemetery in Charleston, South Carolina.

He received credentials as a Member-elect to the Forty-seventh Congress, but his ability to take his seat was delayed, pending a contest of the election by Edmund W.M. Mackey. The inquiry subsequently resulted successfully for the contestant, although O’Connor had died in Charleston, South Carolina, April 26, 1881, before the resolution was announced. He was interred in St. Lawrence Cemetery.

== See also ==
- List of members of the United States Congress who died in office (1790–1899)

== Sources ==
=== Books ===
- Memorial Addresses on the Life and Character of Michael P. O'Connor, a Representative from South Carolina. Washington, DC: US Government Printing Office. 1882.

== External sources ==
- United States Congress. "Michael P. O'Connor (id: O000031)". Biographical Directory of the United States Congress.

U.S. House of Representatives
Preceded by Richard H. Cain	Member of the U.S. House of Representatives from South Carolina's 2nd congressional district 1879–1881	Succeeded by Edmund W.M. Mackey
