= Edmund W. M. Mackey =

American politician (1846–1884)

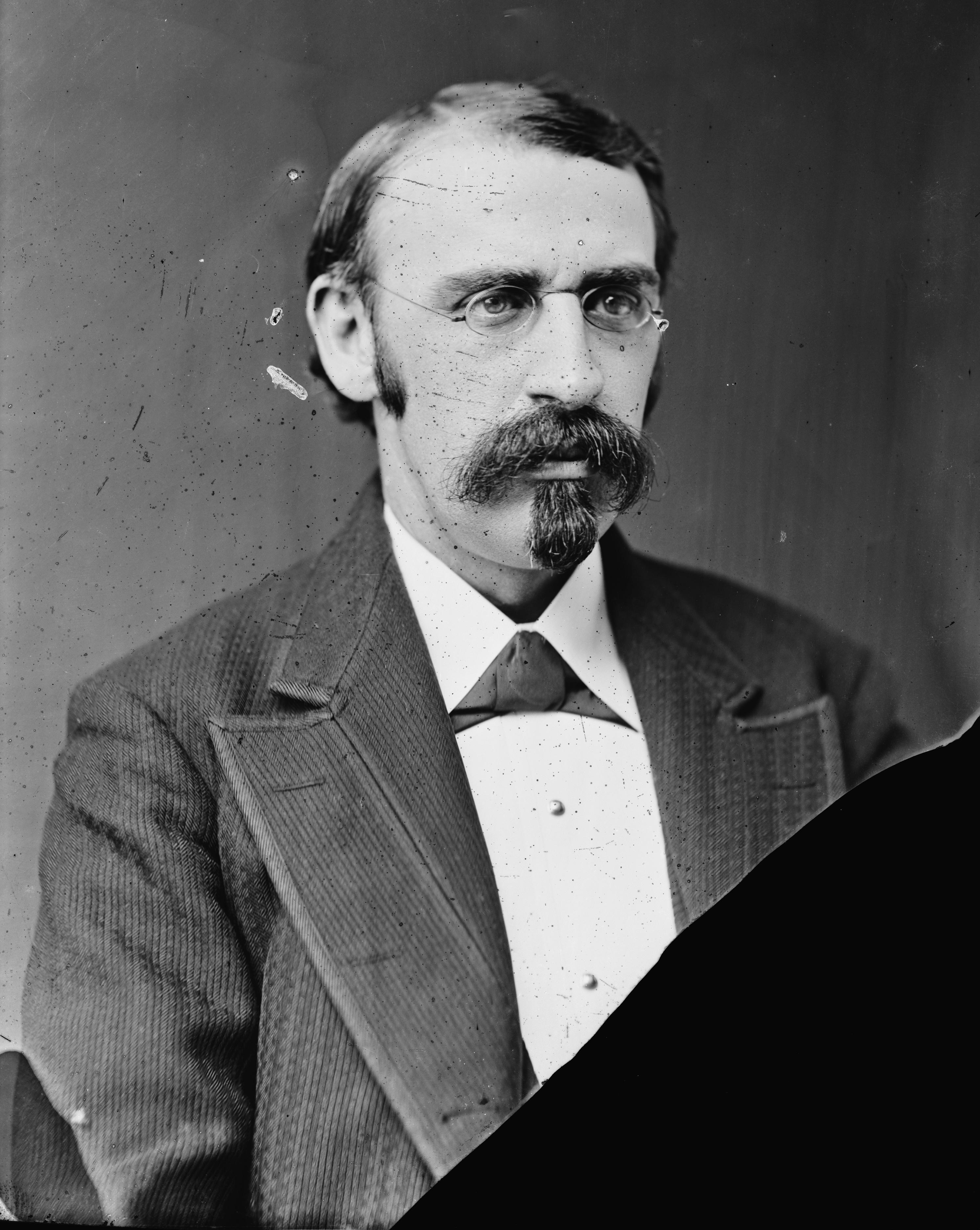

Member of the U.S. House of Representatives from South Carolina
- In office March 4, 1875 – July 19, 1876
- Preceded by: Alonzo J. Ransier
- Succeeded by: Charles W. Buttz
- Constituency: 2nd district
- In office May 31, 1882 – January 27, 1884
- Preceded by: Samuel Dibble
- Succeeded by: Robert Smalls
- Constituency: 2nd district (1882–83); 7th district (1883–84)

Chair of the South Carolina Republican Party
- In office 1880 – January 27, 1884
- Preceded by: Robert Brown Elliott
- Succeeded by: Thomas E. Miller

29th Speaker of the South Carolina House of Representatives
- In office 1876–1877
- Preceded by: Robert B. Elliott
- Succeeded by: William Henry Wallace

Member of the South Carolina House of Representatives from Charleston County
- In office October 24, 1873 – March 17, 1874
- In office November 28, 1876 – May 29, 1877

Sheriff of Charleston County
- In office 1868–1872

Personal details
- Born: March 8, 1846 Charleston, South Carolina, U.S.
- Died: January 27, 1884 (aged 37) Washington, D.C., U.S.
- Party: Republican (until 1874; 1876–onward); Independent Republican (1874–1876)
- Spouse: Vicky Sumter (m. 1874)
- Children: 2
- Parent: Albert Mackey
- Profession: lawyer, politician

Edmund William McGregor Mackey (March 8, 1846 – January 27, 1884) was a lawyer, state representative, and United States representative from South Carolina. He was a leader in the Republican Party.

== Life and career ==
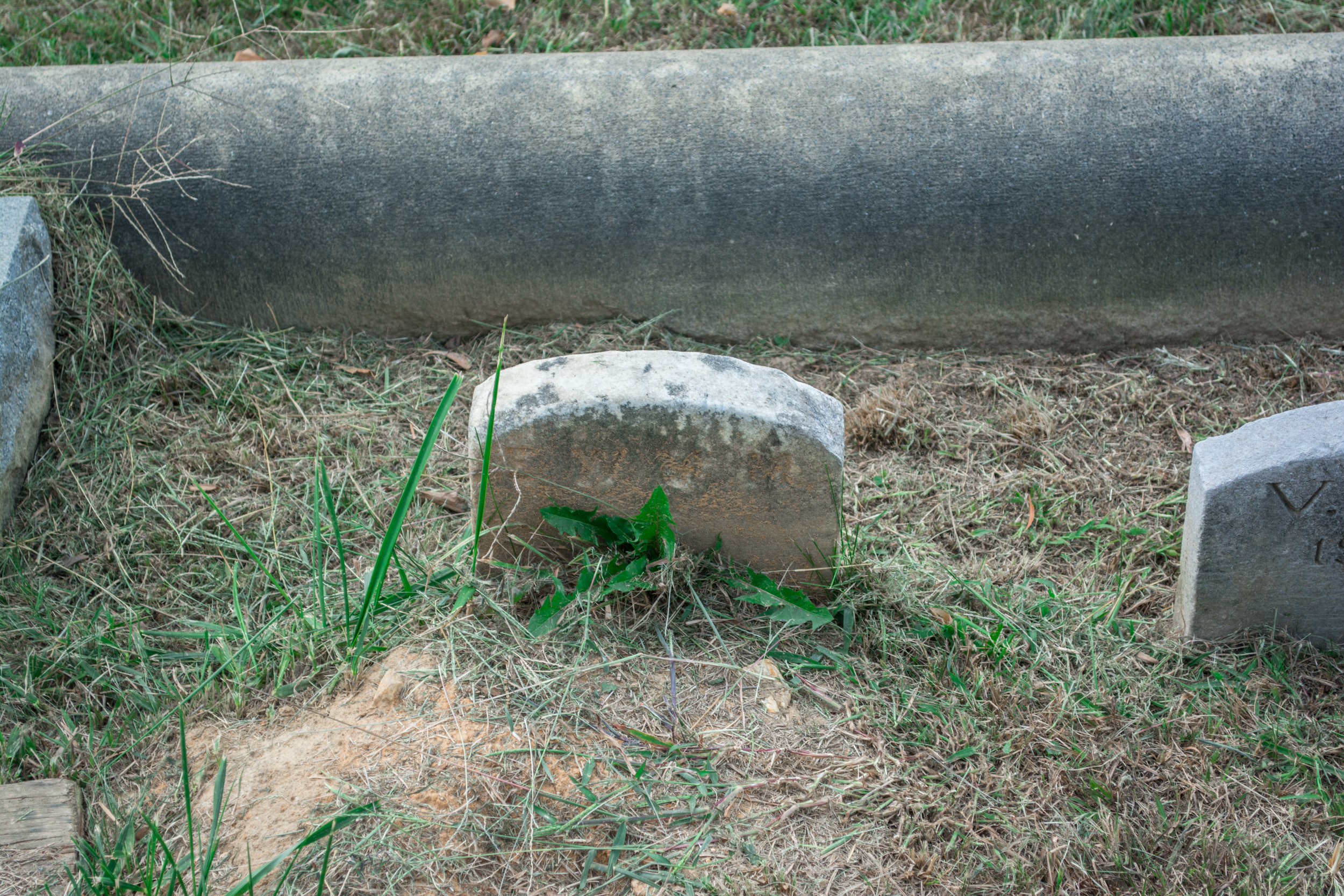
Grave of Edmund Mackey at Glenwood Cemetery.

Born in Charleston, his father was Dr. Albert Mackey, who was the primary founder of Scottish Rite Freemasonry.

Edmund became a representative after the end of the American Civil War. An active Republican, he was nominated to be a delegate from Charleston for the constitutional convention of South Carolina in 1868. He was admitted to the bar in 1868 and practiced law in Charleston while also serving as sheriff and alderman.

Mackey was elected as a Republican to the South Carolina House of Representatives in 1872. He campaigned successfully in 1874 as an Independent Republican for the Second Congressional District. The 44th Congress declared his seat vacant on July 19, 1876.

He was elected again to the South Carolina House of Representatives in 1876 and claimed to be the Speaker after a tumultuous campaign in the state, marked by violence and intimidation. Republicans disputed the election of Democratic Representatives from Edgefield and Laurens counties because of massive fraud in the election and the barring of freedmen from the polls by Democratic Party Red Shirts. Following the South Carolina Supreme Court's decision to allow seating of elected legislators from Edgefield and Laurens counties, rival state governments assembled. Mackey and the Republican legislators occupied the South Carolina State House with the support of Federal troops.

The order of President Hayes to remove Federal troops from South Carolina on April 10, 1877, a result of a political compromise ended the Republicans' struggle to control state government. The Democrats annulled the election of representatives from Charleston County, including Edmund Mackey.

Mackey continued to be active in public life serving as an assistant United States attorney for South Carolina from 1878 to 1881. Mackey attempted to win election as a Republican to the U.S. House of Representatives from South Carolina, but lost the election against Michael P. O’Connor for the 2nd congressional district in 1878 and failed to have the Democratic-controlled House overturn the election. With the Republican takeover of the House for the Forty-seventh Congress, Mackey succeeded in replacing Samuel Dibble for the House seat. Re-elected in 1882 from the Seventh Congressional District, Mackey died during the term in Washington, D.C., on January 27, 1884.

== Personal life ==
In 1874, he married his wife, Victoria Sumter, who was part African American. They had two sons.

== See also ==
- List of members of the United States Congress who died in office (1790–1899)

U.S. House of Representatives
Preceded by Alonzo J. Ransier	Member of the U.S. House of Representatives from South Carolina's 2nd congressional district 1875–1876	Succeeded by Charles W. Buttz
Preceded by Samuel Dibble	Member of the U.S. House of Representatives from South Carolina's 2nd congressional district 1882–1883	Succeeded by George D. Tillman
Preceded by District re-established	Member of the U.S. House of Representatives from South Carolina's 7th congressional district 1883–1884	Succeeded by Robert Smalls
