= Lynching of Manse Waldrop =

White lynching victim in Pickens County, SC (1887)

- Location: Pickens County, South Carolina, U.S.
- Date: December 30, 1887
- Attack type: Lynching
- Victims: Manse Waldrop, 35
- Motive: Retaliation for the alleged rape and murder of a 14-year-old African-American girl
- Convictions: Murder
- Convicted: William C. Williams and Harrison Heyward (both pardoned)

On December 30, 1887, in South Carolina, a 35-year-old white man named Manse Waldrop was lynched by a mostly African-American mob for allegedly raping and murdering a 14-year-old African-American girl named Lula Sherman. On March 6, 1889, three members of the mob, William C. Williams, Harrison Heyward, and Henry Bolton, were convicted of murder. The jury recommended mercy for all three men. Williams and Heyward were both sentenced to death, while Bolton was granted a new trial. The executions were scheduled for April 2. A total of 52 petitions, signed by 3,000 white people and black people, urged pardons for the men. In one petition, a group of white people said that while they were against lynching, it would be an injustice to punish William and Heyward. Another petition said Waldrop was guilty and had committed other rapes. Samuel Dibble, a white politician, said he viewed lynching to avenge rape as justifiable, regardless of race.

The judge in the case, Joseph J. Norton, also petitioned for a pardon for the convicts. Norton said he was bound by the law to sentence Williams and Heyward to death after they were convicted of premeditated murder, but that the jurors most likely never intended for the defendants to be executed and might've reached a different verdict had they known their recommendation for mercy would be ignored.

Governor John Peter Richardson III granted reprieves to Williams and Heyward. On April 15, 1889, he pardoned them and Bolton. In pardoning the three, Richardson said he did not condone lynching, but that it would be hypocritical to punish the men. He said he would not pardon a white man for lynching a black person, but could not bring himself to punish black men for simply copying the acts of white people.

"These men had seen the law broken and lynchers go free countless times. If the lynchers are to be allowed to go free in other incidents, then these ignorant negroes should not be made to suffer."
