= Albert Mackey =

American physician (1807–1881)

Albert G. Mackey
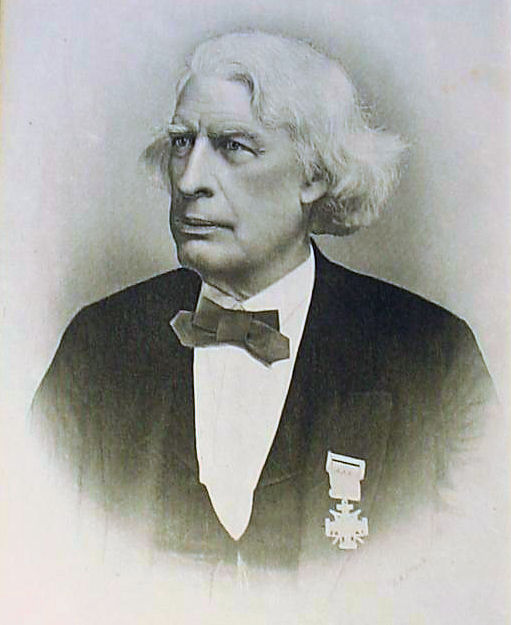
- Albert Mackey about 1870
- Born: March 13, 1807; Charleston, South Carolina, U.S.
- Died: June 21, 1881 (aged 74); Fortress Monroe, Virginia, U.S.
- Occupation: Physician
- Known for: Pioneering Masonic author and encyclopedian
- Children: Edmund Mackey

Albert Gallatin Mackey (March 12, 1807 – June 20, 1881) was an American medical doctor and writer. He is best known for his books and articles about freemasonry, particularly the Masonic Landmarks. A unionist, he was a delegate to South Carolina's post-civil war constitutional convention, serving as the body's president, and held federal office.

== Biography ==
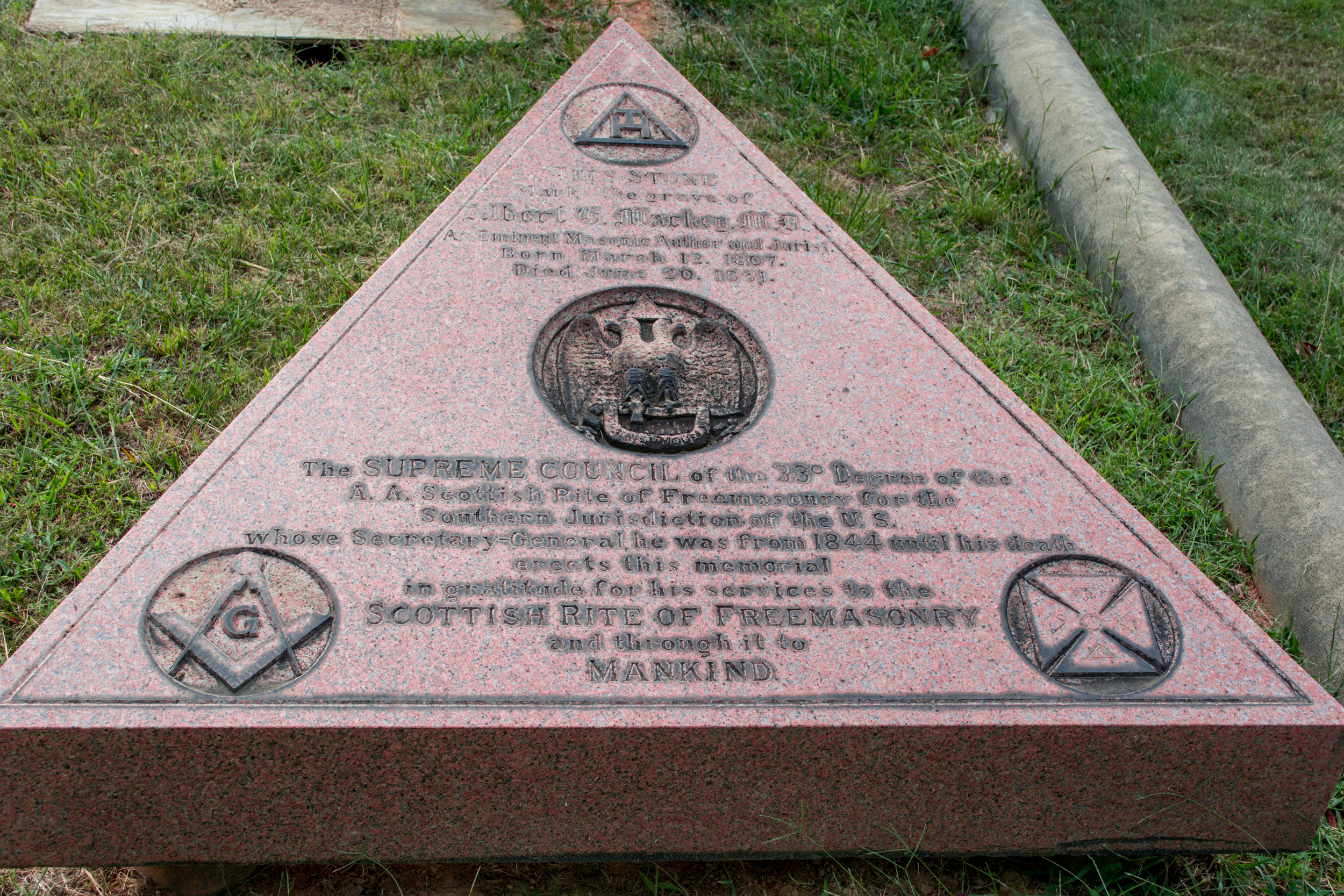
Grave of Albert Mackey at Glenwood Cemetery in Washington, D.C.

Albert Gallatin Mackey was born in Charleston, South Carolina, the son of John Mackey (1765 – December 14, 1831), a physician, journalist and educator. His father published The American Teacher's Assistant and Self-Instructor's Guide, containing all the Rules of Arithmetic properly Explained, etc. (Charleston, 1826), the most comprehensive work on arithmetic that had been published in the United States. His son was Edmund William McGregor Mackey who became a member of the U.S. House of Representatives from South Carolina.

After completing his early education, Albert Mackey taught school for some time to earn money for medical school. He graduated from the medical department of the College of South Carolina in 1832. He settled in Charleston, South Carolina. In 1838 he was appointed demonstrator of anatomy in that institution.

In 1844 he abandoned the practice of medicine. For the rest of his life, he wrote on a variety of subjects, but specialized in the study of several languages, the Middle Ages, and Freemasonry. After being connected with several Charleston journals, he established in 1849 The Southern and Western Masonic Miscellany, a weekly magazine. He maintained it for three years, mostly by his own expense. He conducted a Quarterly 1858-1860 which he devoted to the same interests.

He acquired the Greek, Latin, Hebrew, and continental languages almost unaided, and lectured frequently on the intellectual and moral development of the Middle Ages. Subsequently, he turned his attention exclusively to the investigation of abstruse symbolism, and to cabalistic and Talmudic researches.

Mackey was the Master of Solomon's Lodge No.1 in 1843. He served as Grand Lecturer and Grand Secretary of The Grand Lodge of South Carolina, as well as Secretary General of the Supreme Council of the Ancient and Accepted Scottish Rite for the Southern Jurisdiction of the United States.

Mackey was a Union sympathizer during the Civil War and in July, 1865, President Andrew Johnson appointed him Collector of the Port of Charleston. He was a delegate and president of the 1868 South Carolina Constitutional Convention. He ran for the United States Senate in South Carolina in 1868, but was narrowly defeated by Republican Frederick A. Sawyer.

Mackey moved to Washington, D.C. in 1870. He died in Fortress Monroe, Virginia in 1881.

== Bibliography ==
Mackey's books were often revised and expanded during and after his lifetime, and published by many different publishers.

- Albert Gallatin Mackey (1845). A Lexicon of Freemasonry. 2nd ed., 1852
- A. G. Mackey (M.D.) (1869). Lexicon of Freemasonry (30th ed.). Philadelphia.
- The Principles of Masonic Law, 1856
- Albert Gallatin Mackey (1867). The Mystic Tie. Masonic Publishing andManufacturing Co.
- Encyclopedia of Freemasonry (1873; reprinted in 1878. Subsequently, enlarged and revised by other authors into several volumes after his death). His largest and most important contribution to masonic literature.
  - Mackey, Albert Gallatin, Edward L Hawkins, and William J Hughan. An encyclopaedia of freemasonry and its kindred sciences : comprising the whole range of arts, sciences and literature as connected with the institution 1927.
- The Symbolism of Freemasonry, 1882
- Albert Gallatin Mackey (with William R. Singleton) (1906). The History of Freemasonry: Its Legends and Traditions.
- Masonry defined : a liberal masonic education; information every mason should have, compiled from the writings of Dr. Albert G. Mackey, 33,̊ and many other eminent authorities. 3rd ed. 1925
- Mackey, Albert G. A Manual of the Lodge: Or, Monitorial Instructions in the Degrees of Entered Apprentice, Fellow Craft, and Master Mason, Arranged in Accordance with the American System of Lectures, to Which Are Added the Ceremonies of the Order of Past Master, Relating to Installations, Dedications, Consecrations, Laying of Corner Stones, Etc. New York: Clark & Maynard, 1870. Print.
- Mackey, Albert G. The Book of the Chapter: Or, Monitorial Instructions, in the Degrees of Mark, Past and Most Excellent Master, and the Holy Royal Arch. New York: Clark & Maynard, 1870.
