= Julius A. Dargan House =

Historic house in South Carolina, United States

- U.S. National Register of Historic Places
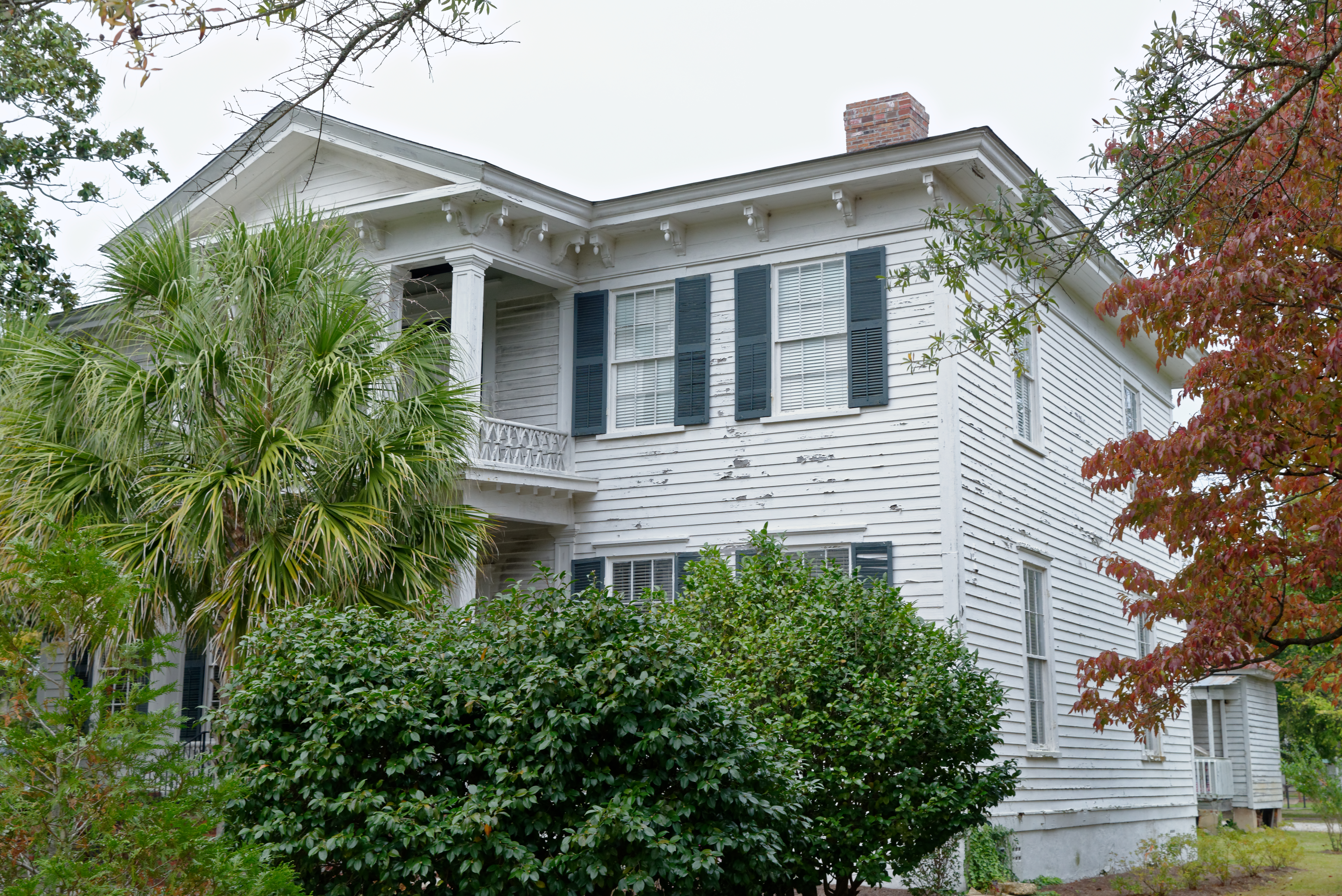

- Location within South Carolina Location within the United States
- Location: 488 Pearl Street, Darlington, South Carolina
- Coordinates: 34°17′59″N 79°52′40″W
- Area: 1 acre (0.40 ha)
- Built: c. 1856
- Architectural style: Greek Revival
- MPS: City of Darlington MRA
- NRHP reference No.: 88000036
- Added to NRHP: February 10, 1988

Julius A. Dargan House (also known as the Kollock-Stone House) is a historic house located at 488 Pearl Street in Darlington, Darlington County, South Carolina.

== Description and history ==
It was built about 1856, and is a rectangular, two-story weatherboarded Greek Revival style residence with interior stuccoed chimneys. It has a hipped roof and a two-tiered, pedimented portico with four square, paneled columns on each floor. It was the home of Julius Alfred Dargan (1815-1861) a lawyer, a member of the House of Representatives, a trustee of the Darlington Academy, and a signer of the Ordinance of Secession in 1860.

It was listed on the National Register of Historic Places on February 10, 1988.
