= Samuel Dibble =

American politician (1837–1913)

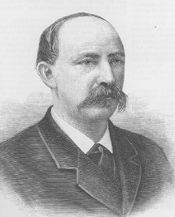

Member of the U.S. House of Representatives from South Carolina's 1st district
- In office March 4, 1883 – March 3, 1891
- Preceded by: John S. Richardson
- Succeeded by: William H. Brawley

Member of the U.S. House of Representatives from South Carolina's 2nd district
- In office June 9, 1881 – May 31, 1882
- Preceded by: Michael P. O'Connor
- Succeeded by: Edmund W.M. Mackey

Member of the South Carolina House of Representatives from Orangeburg County
- In office June 1, 1877 – March 22, 1878
- Preceded by: Daniel Augustus Straker
- Succeeded by: Multi-member district

Personal details
- Born: September 16, 1837 Charleston, South Carolina
- Died: September 16, 1913 (aged 76) Baltimore, Maryland
- Resting place: Orangeburg, South Carolina
- Party: Democratic
- Spouse: Mary Christiana Louis (m. 1864)
- Children: Frances Agnes Dibble (b. 1866); Samuel Dibble II (b. 1868); Louis Virgil Dibble (b. 1873); Mary Henley Dibble (b. 1874)
- Education: Wofford College
- Profession: lawyer, politician
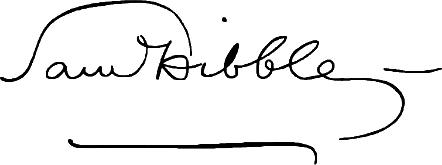
- Signature

Samuel Dibble (September 16, 1837 – September 16, 1913) was a lawyer, educator and Confederate Civil War veteran who served several terms as U.S. Representative from South Carolina during the 1880s.

== Birth and childhood ==
Samuel Dibble was born in Charleston, South Carolina, the oldest son of Philander Virgil (1808–1883) and Frances Ann (Evans) Dibble (1815–1891). Philander and his brother Andrew Dibble (1800–1846) moved from Bethel, Connecticut, to Charleston engaging in business together as hatters. Ann Evans was a descendant of the Gabeau family of French Huguenots and the Henley family of England. Dibble is a direct descendant of Thomas Dibble who came from England to Dorchester, Massachusetts, in 1630 as part of the Puritan migration to New England (1620–1640) and in 1635, Thomas Dibble was one of the founders of Windsor, Connecticut.

Young Dibble pursued an academic course in Bethel, Connecticut (his father's birthplace), and Charleston, South Carolina.

== College and law school years ==
Starting in 1853, Dibble attended the College of Charleston for two years, and graduated A. B. from Wofford College, Spartanburg, South Carolina, in July, 1856, under the presidency of Rev. William M. Wightman, being the first graduate of that institution. While at Wofford, Dibble was a member of the Calhoun Literary Society. Dibble later received the degree LL. D. from his alma mater.

After graduating he taught at Shilow Academy and Pine Grove Academy in Orangeburg District from 1856 to 1857 and was assistant teacher of the preparatory department of Wofford College in the spring of 1858. Dibble also studied law between 1858 and 1859 under Jefferson Choice of Spartanburg, and Lesesne and Wilkins of Charleston, and was admitted as an attorney of law in December, 1859, and as a solicitor in equity in 1865 having studied equity under Hon. Charles H. Simonton. In January, 1860, he began his practice of law in Orangeburg, South Carolina.

== Civil War ==
He served in the Confederate States Army throughout the Civil War. He resumed the practice of law in Orangeburg, South Carolina and also edited the Orangeburg News.

On January 3, 1861, Samuel Dibble volunteered as a private in the Edisto Rifles in Col. Johnson Hagood's First Regiment of South Carolina Volunteers later attaining the rank of first lieutenant. The company later became a part of the Eutaw Regiment, Twenty-Fifth South Carolina Volunteers under Col. Charles H. Simonton, a part of Hagood's Brigade, Hokes' Division of the Army of Northern Virginia. He was also a lieutenant of Wade Hampton III.

== Politics ==
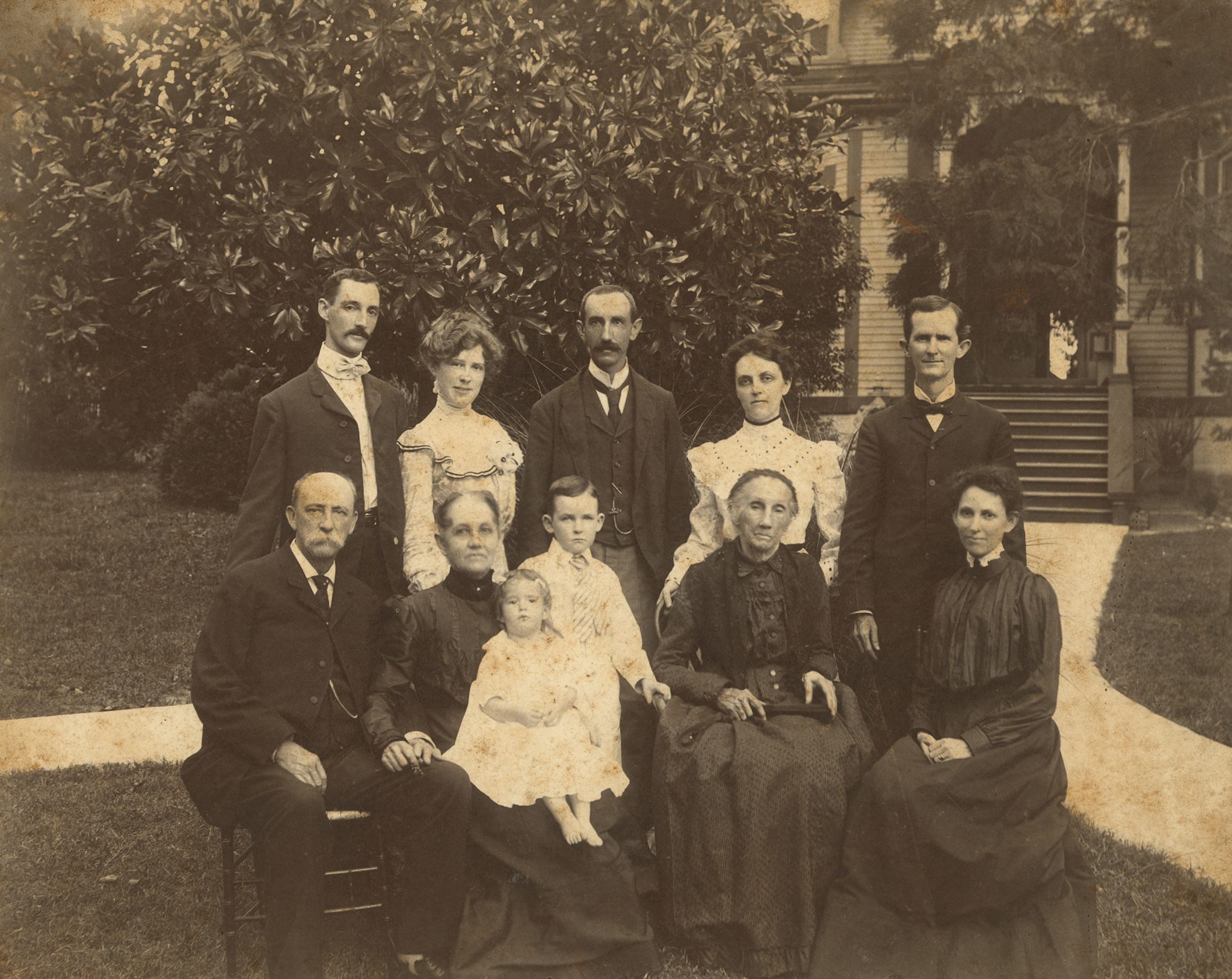
Samuel Dibble family of Orangeburg, South Carolina c. 1901 Front row: Samuel Dibble, his wife Mary Christiana Louis Dibble, their grandchild Mary Caroline Moss, Samuel Dibble Moss (known as Dibble Moss), Ann Agnes Hall Louis (widow of Deopold Louis), Frances Agnes Dibble Moss (known as Agnes Moss). Back row: Louis Virgil Dibble; Annie Leak Wyatt Dibble; Samuel Dibble II, Mary Henley Dibble ("May" - later Mrs. W.W. Watson); Benjamin Hart Moss.

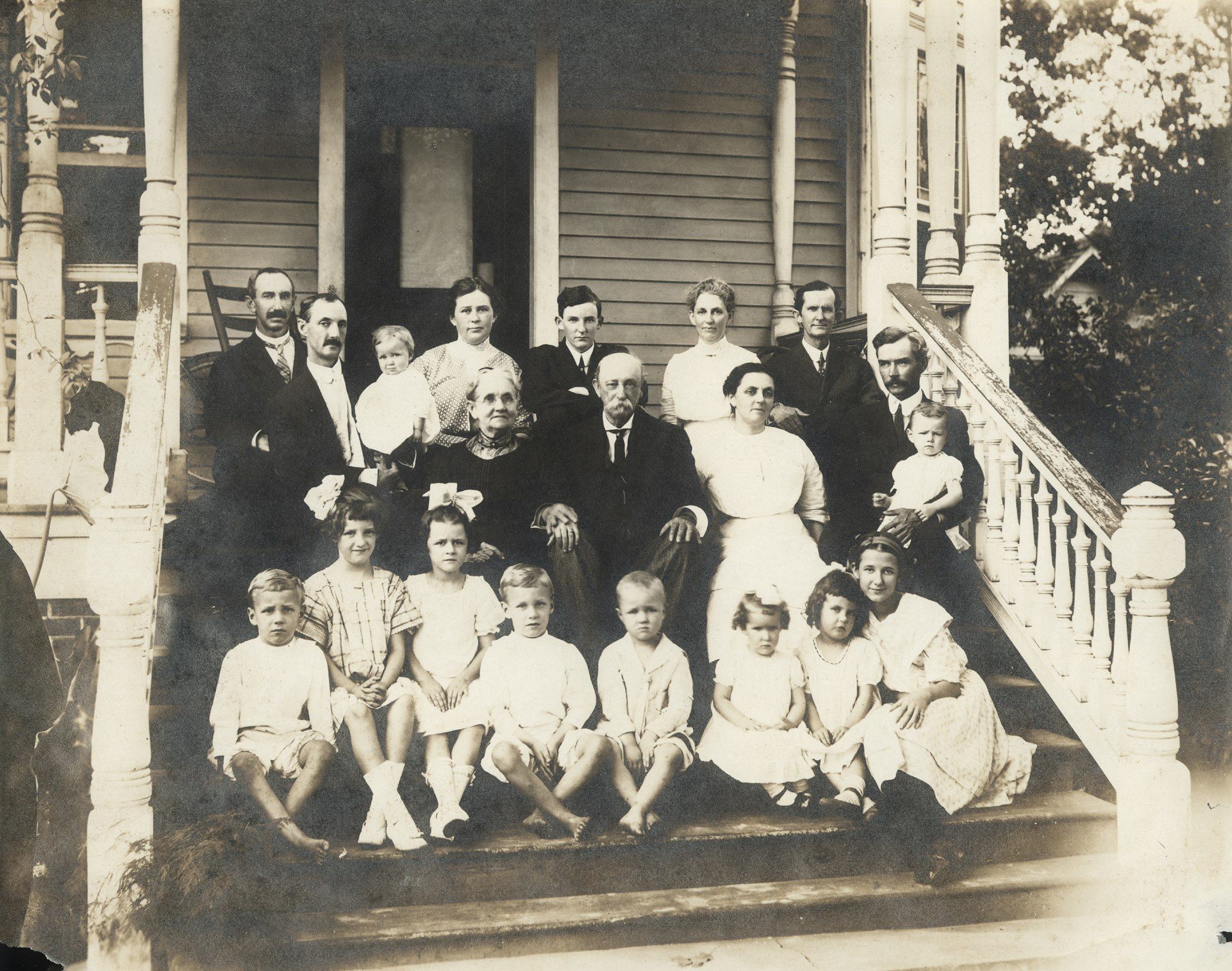
Samuel Dibble I family of Orangeburg SC c. 1912 Back row: Samuel Dibble II, Louis Virgil Dibble, Rosa Parsons Dibble (baby), Ann Eliza Leak Wyatt Dibble, Samuel Dibble Moss, Frances Agnes Dibble Moss, Benjamin Hart Moss. Middle row: Mary Christiana Louis Dibble, Samuel Dibble, Mary "May" Henley Watson, Whitefield William Watson, Agnes Adele Watson (baby). Front row: Samuel Gabeau Dibble ? twin, Annie Leak Dibble (Bradley), Mary Louis Watson (Coleman), Thomas Wyatt Dibble ? twin, Samuel Dibble "Sam" Watson; Angelina Wannamaker Watson (Mayes), Mary Agnes Dibble (Morris), Mary Caroline Moss.

Samuel Dibble served as member of the State house of representatives in 1877 and 1878. Trustee of the University of South Carolina at Columbia in 1878. He served as member of the Board of School Commissioners of Orangeburg County. He served as delegate to the Democratic National Convention in 1880.

=== Congressional controversy ===
He presented credentials as a Democratic Member-elect to the Forty-seventh Congress to fill a vacancy thought to exist by reason of the death (pending a contest) of Michael P. O'Connor, and served from June 9, 1881, to May 31, 1882, when the seat was awarded to Edmund W.M. Mackey under the original election.

In 1889, Dibble petitioned for the pardon of three black men who had been convicted for the lynching of Manse Waldrop. Dibble said he viewed lynching to avenge rape as justifiable, regardless of race.

=== Return to Congress ===
Dibble was elected to the Forty-eighth and to the three succeeding Congresses (March 4, 1883 – March 3, 1891). He served as chairman of the Committee on Public Buildings and Grounds (Forty-ninth and Fiftieth Congresses). He declined to be a candidate for reelection in 1890.

== Later life ==
He engaged in banking and other business interests in Orangeburg, South Carolina. He died near Baltimore, Maryland, September 16, 1913, his 76th birthday. He was interred in Sunny Side Cemetery, Orangeburg, South Carolina.

== Sources ==
- United States Congress. "Samuel Dibble (id: D000300)". Biographical Directory of the United States Congress.

U.S. House of Representatives
Preceded by John S. Richardson	Member of the U.S. House of Representatives from South Carolina's 1st congressional district 1883–1891	Succeeded by William H. Brawley
Preceded by Michael P. O'Connor	Member of the U.S. House of Representatives from South Carolina's 2nd congressional district 1881–1882	Succeeded by Edmund W.M. Mackey
