= George W. Dargan =

American politician and lawyer (1841–1898)

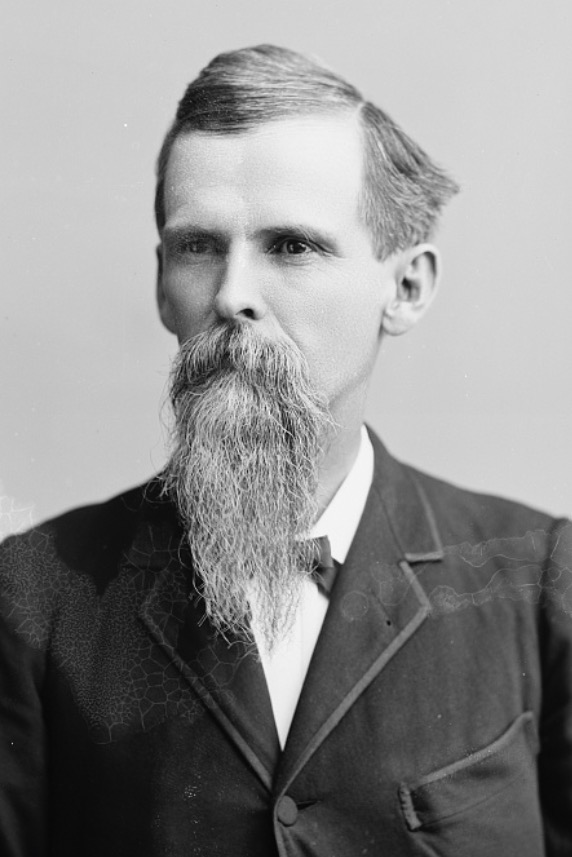
- Portrait of Dargan by Charles Milton Bell, taken between 1873 and 1890

Member of the U.S. House of Representatives from South Carolina's 6th district
- In office March 4, 1883 – March 3, 1891
- Preceded by: District re-established William W. Boyce (1860)
- Succeeded by: Eli T. Stackhouse

Member of the South Carolina House of Representatives
- In office 1877–1878

Personal details
- Born: George William Dargan; May 11, 1841 Darlington, South Carolina, US
- Died: June 29, 1898 (aged 57) Darlington, South Carolina, US
- Party: Democratic
- Relations: Lemuel Benton (great-grandfather); Julius A. Dargan (uncle)
- Occupation: Politician, lawyer

Military service
- Allegiance: Confederate States of America
- Branch/service: Confederate States Army
- Battles/wars: American Civil War

George William Dargan (May 11, 1841 – June 29, 1898) was an American politician and lawyer. A Democrat, he was a member of the United States House of Representatives from South Carolina.

== Biography ==
Dargan was born on May 11, 1841, at "Sleepy Hollow", near Darlington, South Carolina, the son of William Edwin Dargan and Sarah (née DuBose) Dargan. He was the great-grandson of planter Lemuel Benton and the nephew of lawyer Julius A. Dargan.

Educated at local schools, Dargan attended The Citadel. During the American Civil War, he served in the Confederate States Army. After the war, he read law, and in 1872, was admitted to the bar, after which he began practicing law in Darlington. In 1880, he was made solicitor for the 4th South Carolina Circuit Court District. He was later a chancellor.

Dargan was a Democrat. In 1877 and 1878, he was a member of the South Carolina House of Representatives. He was a member of the United States House of Representatives from March 4, 1883, to March 3, 1891, representing South Carolina's 6th district. He was not nominated for the following election. Politically, he was liberal and supported secession. In 1850, he argued in favor of hereditary enslavement as chancellor. In 1895, he was discovered to have illegally funded John L. McLaurin's Congressional compaign to stop Joshua E. Wilson, a black preacher, from winning.

After serving in Congress, Dargan returned to practicing law. In 1861, he married Ida Louise Hunter, having five children together. One of his children, Leon, played shortstop for a local baseball team. In 1889, at age 17, he murdered umpire William Marshall (son of politician Joseph T. Marshall) with a bat, after his team lost a game due to Marshall's calls. Leon was arrested. He died on June 29, 1898, aged 57, in Darlington, and was buried at the First Baptist Churchyard, in Darlington.

U.S. House of Representatives
Preceded by District re-established William W. Boyce (1860)	Member of the U.S. House of Representatives from South Carolina's 6th congressional district 1883–1891	Succeeded by Eli T. Stackhouse
