= Robert Smalls =

Former slave and American politician (1839–1915)

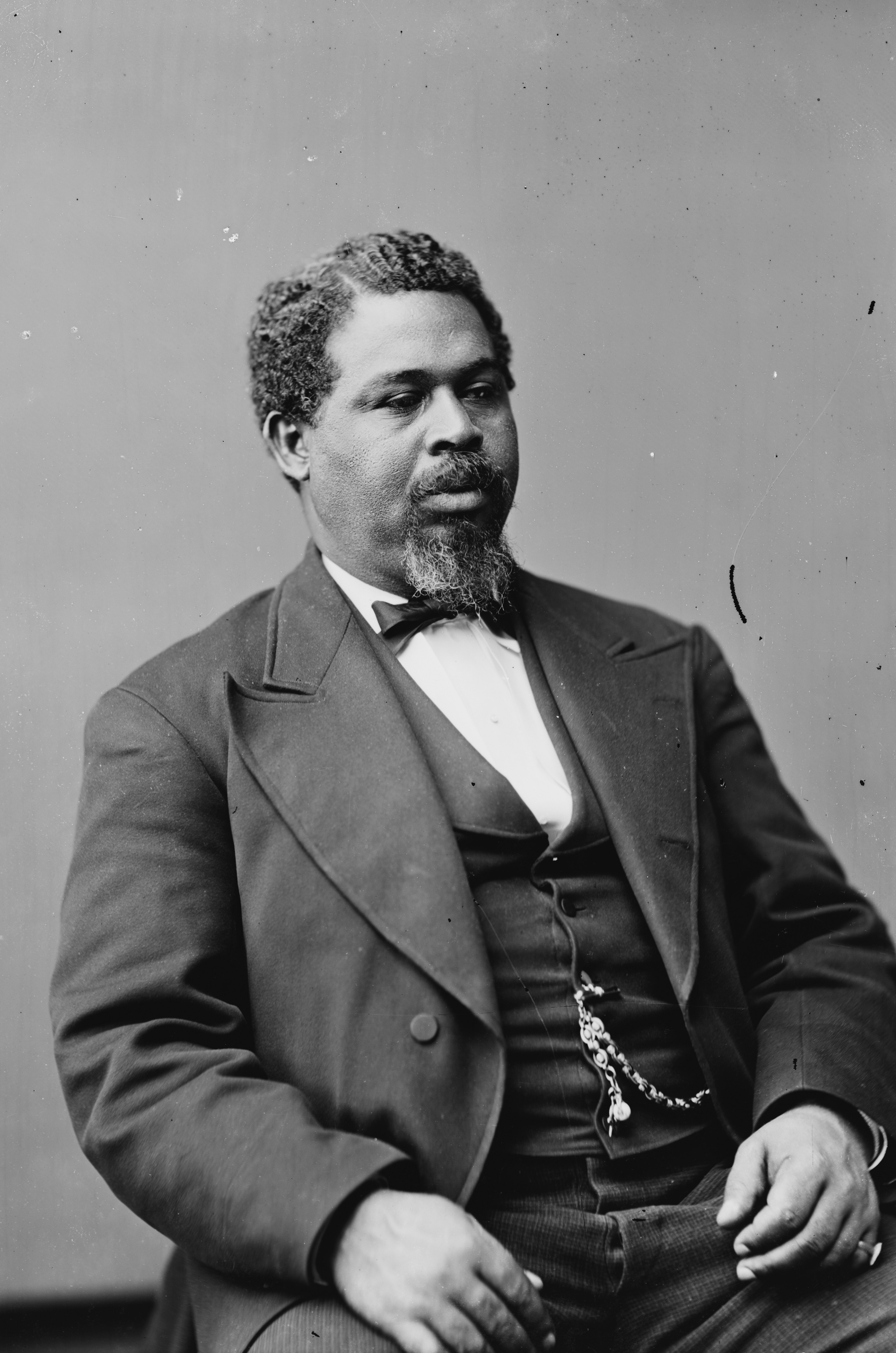
- Portrait by Mathew Brady c. 1875–1879

Member of the U.S. House of Representatives from South Carolina
- In office March 18, 1884 – March 3, 1887
- Preceded by: Edmund W. M. Mackey
- Succeeded by: William Elliott
- Constituency: 7th district
- In office July 19, 1882 – March 3, 1883
- Preceded by: George D. Tillman
- Succeeded by: John J. Hemphill
- Constituency: 5th district
- In office March 4, 1875 – March 3, 1879
- Preceded by: District reestablished
- Succeeded by: George D. Tillman
- Constituency: 5th district

Member of the South Carolina Senate from the Beaufort County district
- In office November 22, 1870 – March 4, 1875
- Preceded by: Jonathan Jasper Wright
- Succeeded by: Samuel Greene

Member of the South Carolina House of Representatives from the Beaufort County district
- In office November 24, 1868 – November 22, 1870

Personal details
- Born: April 5, 1839 Beaufort, South Carolina, U.S.
- Died: February 23, 1915 (aged 75) Beaufort, South Carolina, U.S.
- Party: Republican
- Spouses: Hannah Jones (m. 1856; died 1883) Annie Wigg (m. 1890; died 1895)
- Children: 4

Military service
- Allegiance: United States
- Branch/service: United States Navy; United States
- Years of service: 1862–1868
- Rank: None (Civilian pilot and armed transport sea captain/captain)
- Battles/wars: American Civil War; Blockade of Charleston; Battle of Simmon's Bluff; Second Battle of Pocotaligo; Second Battle of Fort Sumter; Sherman's March to the Sea

Robert Smalls (April 5, 1839 – February 23, 1915) was an American politician who was born into slavery in Beaufort, South Carolina. During the American Civil War, the still enslaved Smalls commandeered a Confederate transport ship in Charleston Harbor and sailed it from the Confederate-controlled waters of the harbor to the U.S. blockade that surrounded it. He then piloted the ship to the Union-controlled enclave in the Beaufort–Port Royal–Hilton Head area, where it became a Union warship. In the process, he freed himself, his crew, and their families. His example and persuasion helped convince President Abraham Lincoln to accept black soldiers into the Union Army.

After the Civil War, Smalls returned to Beaufort and became a politician, winning election as a Republican to the South Carolina Legislature and the United States House of Representatives during the Reconstruction era. He authored state legislation providing for South Carolina to have the first free and compulsory public school system in the United States. He was a founder of the Republican Party of South Carolina and the last member of that party to represent South Carolina's 5th congressional district until the election of Mick Mulvaney in 2010.

== Early life ==
Robert Smalls was born on April 5, 1839, in Beaufort, South Carolina, to Lydia Polite, a woman enslaved by Henry McKee. She gave birth to him in a cabin behind McKee's house, at 511 Prince Street in Beaufort, South Carolina. He grew up in the city under the influence of the Lowcountry Gullah culture of his mother. His mother lived as a servant in the house, but she had grown up working in the fields. Smalls was favored by McKee over his other slaves, so his mother worried that he might grow up not understanding the plight of enslaved field workers, and she asked for him to be made to work in the fields and to witness whippings.

When he was 12, at the request of his mother, Smalls's master sent him to Charleston to hire out as a laborer for sixteen dollars a week, of which he was allowed to keep one dollar, the rest of the wage being paid to his master. Smalls first worked in a hotel, then became a street lamplighter. In his teen years, his love of the sea led him to find work on Charleston's docks and wharves. Smalls worked as a longshoreman, rigger and sailmaker, and he eventually worked his way up to become a wheelman, more or less a helmsman, though enslaved people were not permitted that title. As a result, he was very knowledgeable about Charleston Harbor.

At age 17, Smalls married Hannah Jones, an enslaved hotel maid, in Charleston on December 24, 1856. She was five years older than he was, and she already had two daughters. Their own first child, Elizabeth Lydia Smalls, was born in February 1858. Three years later, they had a son, Robert Jr., who died at age two. Smalls aimed to pay for their freedom by purchasing them outright, but the price was steep, $800 (equivalent to $28,667 in 2025). He had managed to save up only $100. It might have taken him decades to reach $800.

== Civil War ==
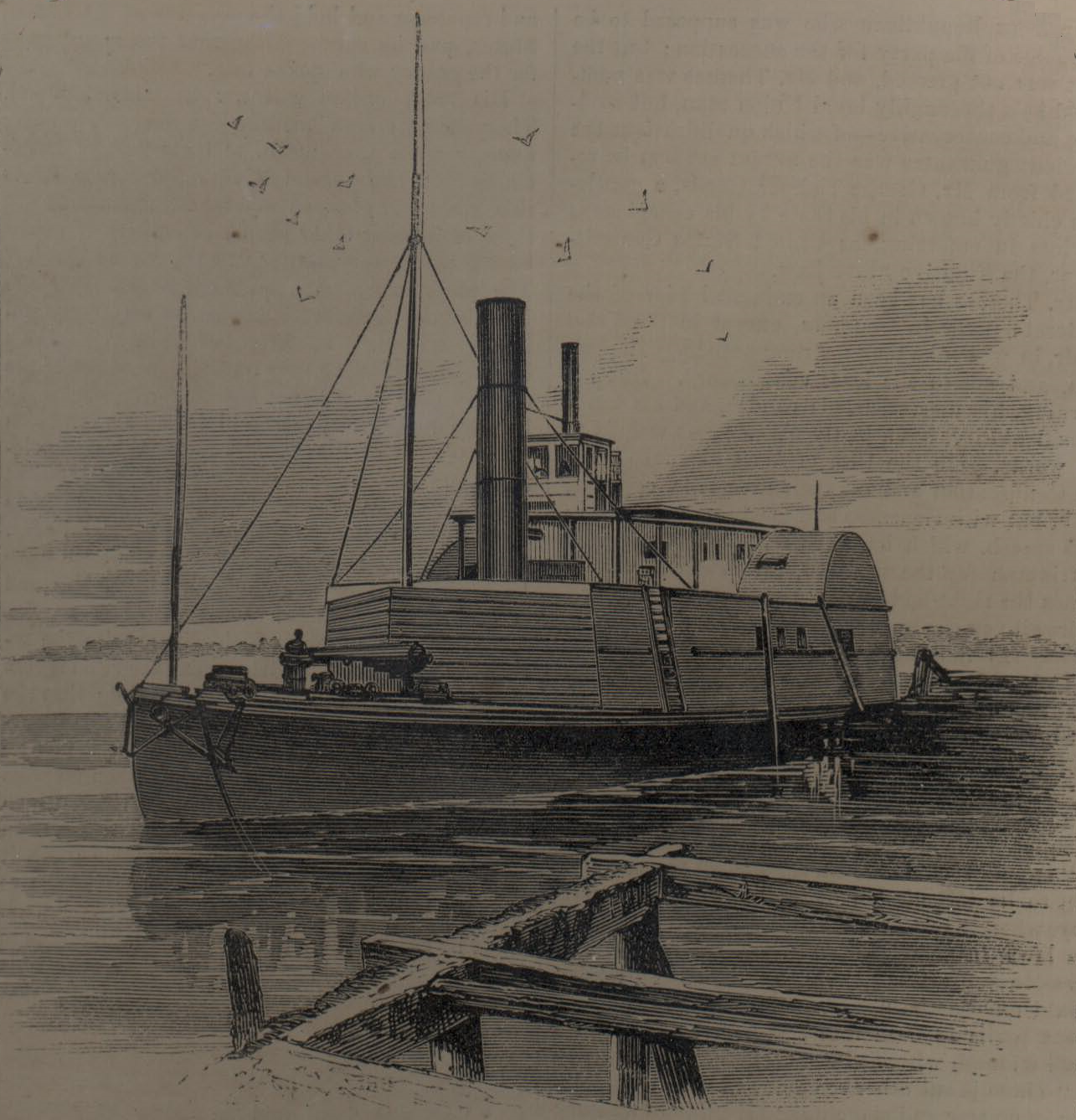
The gunboat CSS Planter, run out of Charleston by Robert Smalls in May 1862

=== Escape from slavery ===
In April 1861, the Civil War began with the Battle of Fort Sumter in nearby Charleston Harbor. In the fall of 1861, Smalls was assigned to steer the CSS Planter, a lightly armed Confederate military transport under the command of Charleston's District Commander Brigadier General Roswell S. Ripley. (Note: The 147-foot Planter was "a 'first-class coastwise steamer' hewn locally for the cotton trade out of 'live oak and red cedar'".) Planter's duties were to survey waterways, lay mines, and deliver dispatches, troops and supplies. Smalls piloted the Planter throughout Charleston harbor and beyond, on area rivers and along the South Carolina, Georgia and Florida coasts. From Charleston harbor, Smalls and the Planter's crew could see the line of federal blockade ships in the outer harbor, seven miles away. Smalls appeared content and had the confidence of the Planter's crew and owners, but, at some time in April 1862, he began to plan an escape. He discussed the matter with all of the other enslaved people in the crew except one, whom he did not trust.

On May 12, 1862, the Planter traveled ten miles southwest of Charleston to stop at Coles Island, a Confederate post on the Stono River that was being dismantled. There, the ship picked up four large guns to transport to a fort in Charleston harbor. Back in Charleston, the crew loaded 200 lb (91 kg) of ammunition and 20 cord (72 m^{3}) of firewood onto the Planter.

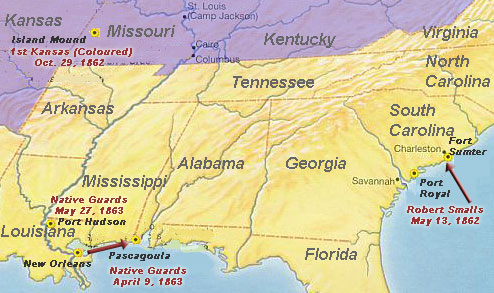
Early African-American involvement in the Civil War, including Robert Smalls's liberation of the Planter

On the evening of May 12, the Planter was docked as usual at the wharf below General Ripley's headquarters. Its three white officers disembarked to spend the night ashore, leaving Smalls and the crew on board, "as was their custom." (Afterward, the three Confederate officers were court-martialed and two convicted, but the verdicts were later overturned.) Before the officers departed, Smalls asked Captain Relyea if the crew's families could visit, which was occasionally allowed, and he approved on condition that they depart before curfew. When the families arrived, the men revealed the plan to them.

This was the first the women and children had heard of it, although Smalls recently had told [his wife] Hannah. She had known that Smalls longed to escape but hadn't realized that he was formulating a plan and intended to execute it. She was taken aback but quickly regained her composure and told him, “It is a risk, dear, but you and I, and our little ones must be free. I will go, for where you die, I will die. The other women were less steadfast. They cried and screamed when they learned what they had stumbled into, and the men struggled to quiet them.... Later, once the shock had worn off, those women admitted that they were glad for a chance at freedom....

At some point, three crew members pretended to escort the family members (Note: These family members were: Smalls's wife Hannah, their two children Elizabeth Lydia and Robert Jr., and Hannah's daughter Clara; Susan Smalls, the wife of another crewman; their child, and Susan's sister; and two other women, Annie White and Lavinia Wilson.) back home, but they circled around and hid aboard another steamer (Note: This steamer's name has been spelled Etowah, Etwan, Etiwan, Etowan and Hetiwan.) docked at the North Atlantic wharf. At about 3:00 a.m. on May 13, Smalls and seven of the eight enslaved crewmen made their previously planned escape to the Union blockade ships. Smalls put on the captain's uniform and wore a straw hat similar to the captain's. He sailed the Planter past what was then called Southern Wharf and stopped at another wharf to pick up his wife and children and the families of other crewmen.

Smalls guided the ship past the five Confederate harbor forts without incident, as he gave the correct steam-whistle signals at checkpoints. The Planter had been commanded by Captain Charles C. J. Relyea, and Smalls copied Relyea's manners and straw hat on deck to fool Confederate onlookers from shore and the forts. The Planter sailed past Fort Sumter at about 4:30 a.m.

As the nearly-free slaves approached Fort Sumter, their apprehension grew. It was the most heavily armed of the Confederate forts and tended to be manned by the most suspicious soldiers. One of the men aboard later said, “When we drew near the fort every man but Robert Smalls felt his knees giving way and the women began crying and praying again." As the Planter approached the fort, several men urged Smalls to give it a wide berth. Smalls refused, saying that such behavior would almost certainly arouse suspicion. He steered the ship along its normal path, slowly, as though he were merely enjoying the early morning air and in no particular hurry. When Fort Sumter flashed the challenge signal, Smalls again gave the correct hand signs. There was a long pause. The fort didn't immediately respond, and Smalls now expected cannon fire to shred the Planter at any moment. Finally, the fort signaled that all was well, and Smalls sailed his ship out of the harbor.

The alarm was only raised after the ship was beyond gun range, for, rather than turn east towards Morris Island, Smalls had headed straight for the Union Navy fleet, replacing the rebel flags with a white bed sheet that had been brought by his wife. The Planter had been seen by the USS Onward, which was about to fire until a crewman spotted the white flag. In the dark, the sheet was difficult to see, but the sunrise arrived which allowed viewing.

Witness account:

Just as No. 3 port gun was being elevated, someone cried out, "I see something that looks like a white flag"; and true enough there was something flying on the steamer that would have been white by application of soap and water. As she neared us, we looked in vain for the face of a white man. When they discovered that we would not fire on them, there was a rush of contrabands out on her deck, some dancing, some singing, whistling, jumping; and others stood looking towards Fort Sumter, and muttering all sorts of maledictions against it, and "de heart of de Souf," generally. As the steamer came near, and under the stern of the Onward, one of the Colored men stepped forward, and taking off his hat, shouted, "Good morning, sir! I've brought you some of the old United States guns, sir!" [That man was Robert Smalls.]

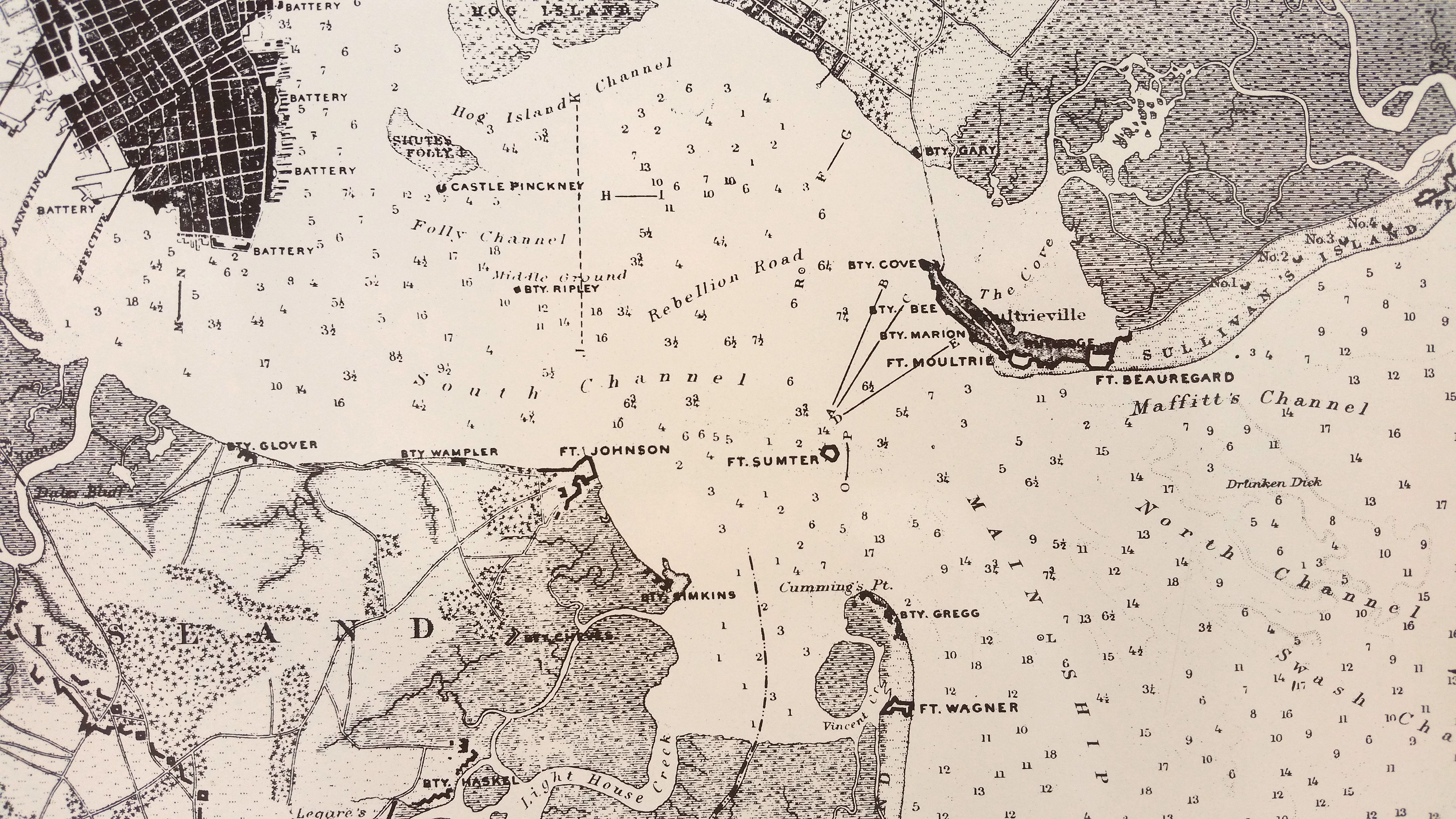
Fort Sumter National Monument marker of the Map of Charleston Harbor defenses

The Onward's captain, John Frederick Nickels, boarded the Planter, and Smalls asked for a United States flag to display. He surrendered the Planter and its cargo to the United States Navy. Smalls's escape plan had succeeded.

The Planter and description of Smalls's actions were forwarded by Nickels to his commander, Capt. E.G. Parrott. In addition to its own light guns, Planter carried the four loose artillery pieces from Coles Island and 200 pounds of ammunition. Most valuable, however, were the captain's code book containing the Confederate signals and a map of the mines and torpedoes that had been laid in Charleston's harbor. Smalls's own extensive knowledge of the Charleston region's waterways and military configurations proved highly valuable. Parrott again forwarded the Planter to flag officer Samuel Francis Du Pont at Port Royal, describing Smalls as very intelligent. Smalls gave detailed information about Charleston's defenses to Du Pont, commander of the blockading fleet. Federal officers were surprised to learn from Smalls that, contrary to their calculations, only a few thousand troops remained to protect the area, the rest having been sent to Tennessee and Virginia. They also learned that the Coles Island fortifications on Charleston's southern flank were being abandoned and were without protection. This intelligence allowed Union forces to capture Coles Island and its string of batteries without a fight on May 20, a week after Smalls's escape. The Union would hold the Stono inlet as a base for the remaining three years of the war. Du Pont was impressed, and he wrote the following to the Navy secretary in Washington: "Robert, the intelligent slave and pilot of the boat, who performed this bold feat so skillfully, informed me of [the capture of the Sumter gun], presuming it would be a matter of interest." He "is superior to any who have come into our lines – intelligent as many of them have been."

=== Service to the Union ===
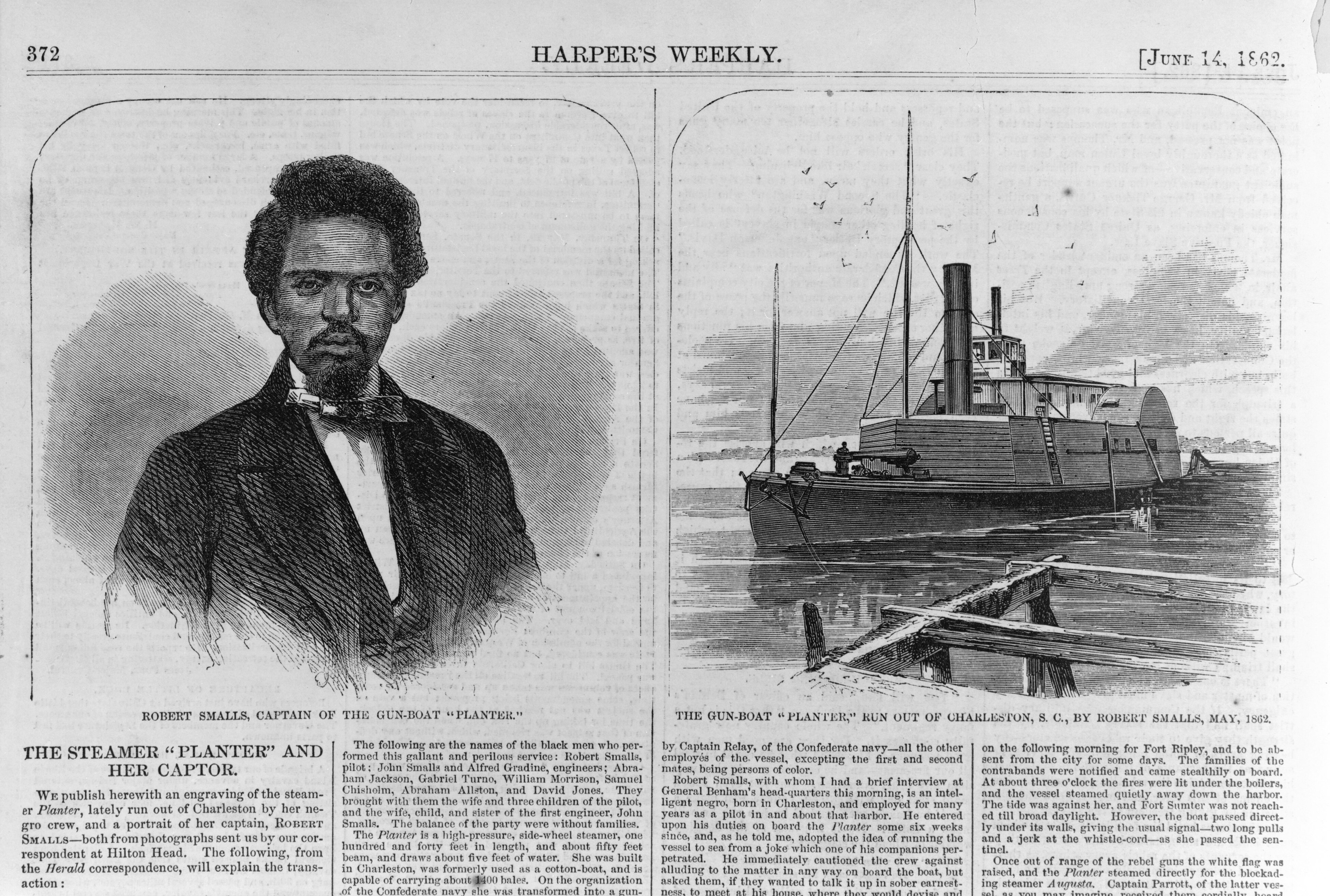
An article on Smalls published in Harper's Weekly, June 14, 1862

Smalls, having just turned 23, quickly became known in the North as a hero for his daring exploit. Newspapers and magazines reported his actions. The U.S. Congress passed a bill awarding Smalls and his crewmen the prize money for the Planter (valuable not only for its guns but also its low draft in Charleston bay); Southern newspapers demanded harsh discipline for the Confederate officers whose joint shore leave had allowed Smalls and his men to steal the boat. Smalls's share of the prize money came to US$1,500 (equivalent to $48,375 in 2025). Immediately after the capture, Smalls was invited to travel to New York to help raise money for formerly enslaved people, but Du Pont vetoed the proposal, and Smalls began to serve the Union Navy, especially with his detailed knowledge of mines laid near Charleston. However, with the encouragement of Major General David Hunter, the Union commander at Port Royal, Smalls went to Washington, D.C., in August 1862 with Rev. Mansfield French, a Methodist minister who had helped found Wilberforce University in Ohio and had been sent by the American Missionary Association to help formerly enslaved people at Port Royal. They wanted to persuade Lincoln and Secretary of War Edwin Stanton to permit African-American men to fight for the Union. Although Lincoln had previously rescinded orders by Generals Hunter, Fremont and Sherman to mobilize African-American troops, Stanton soon signed an order permitting up to 5,000 African Americans to enlist in the Union forces at Port Royal. Those who did were organized as the 1st and 2nd South Carolina Regiments (Colored). Smalls worked as a civilian with the Navy until March 1863, when he was transferred to the Army. By his own account, Smalls was present at 17 major battles and engagements in the Civil War.

After capture, the Planter required some repairs, which were performed locally, and went into Union service near Fort Pulaski. The boat was valued for its shallow draft, compared to other boats in the fleet. Smalls was made pilot of the Crusader under Captain Alexander Rhind. In June of that year, Smalls was piloting the Crusader on Edisto in Wadmalaw Sound when the Planter returned to service, and an infantry regiment engaged in the Battle of Simmon's Bluff at the head of the Edisto River. He continued to pilot the Crusader and the Planter. While enslaved, he had assisted in laying mines (then called "torpedoes") along the coast and river. Now, as a pilot, he helped find and remove them and serviced the blockade between Charleston and Beaufort. He was also present when the Planter was fired upon at several fights at Adam's Run on the Dawho River and at battles at Rockville, at John's Island, and at the Second Battle of Pocotaligo.

He was made pilot of the ironclad USS Keokuk, again under Captain Rhind, and took part in the attack on Fort Sumter on April 7, 1863, which was a preamble to the Second Battle of Fort Sumter later that fall. The Keokuk took 96 hits and retired for the night, sinking the next morning. Smalls and much of the crew moved to the Ironside, and the fleet returned to Hilton Head.

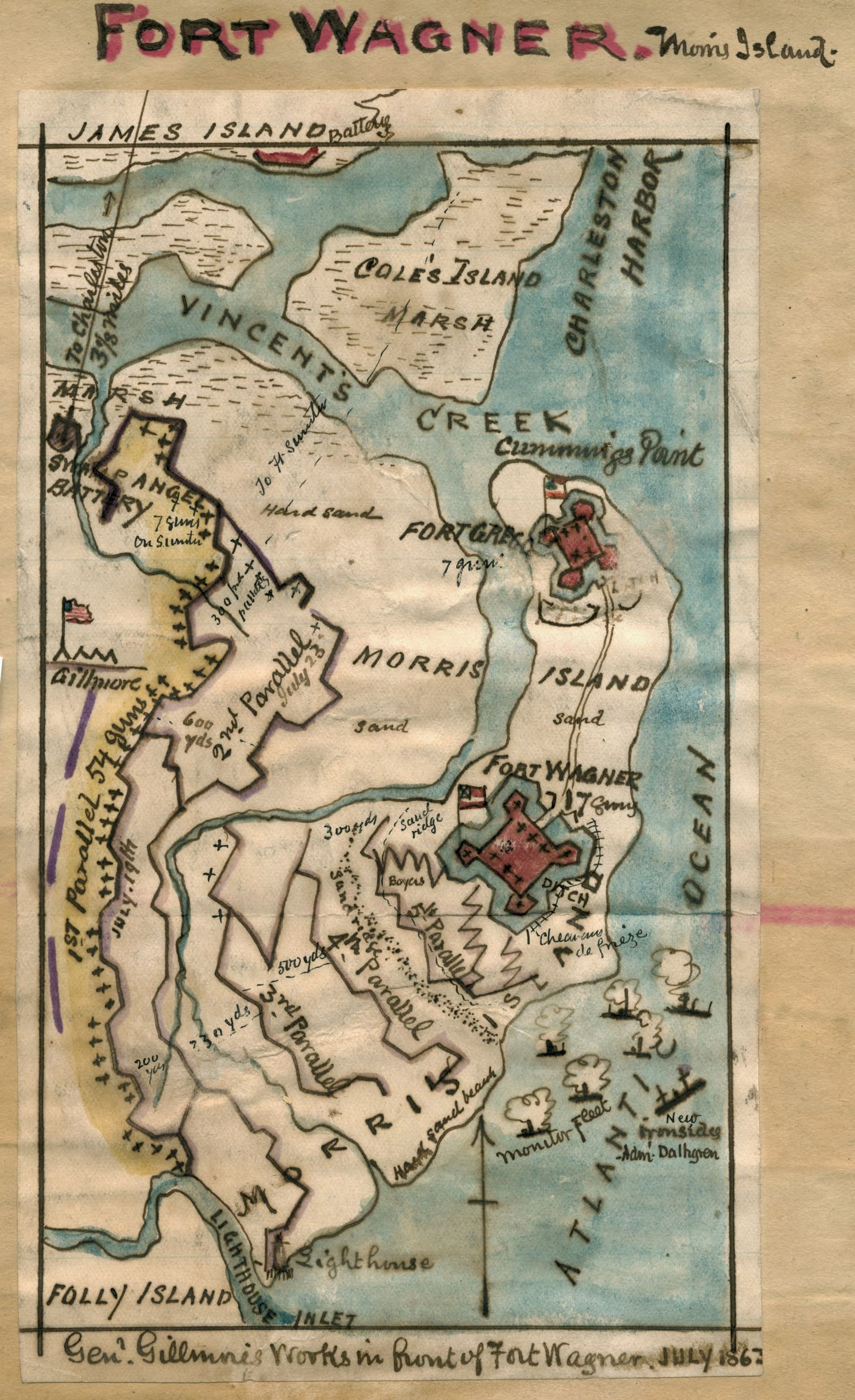
Gillmore's approaches on Fort Wagner, Morris Island, July 1863 before the Second Battle of Fort Wagner. Lighthouse where Smalls served is marked on southern end of Morris Island.

In June 1863, Hunter was replaced as commander of the Department of the South by Quincy Adams Gillmore. With Gillmore's arrival, Smalls was transferred to the quartermaster's department. Smalls was pilot of the USS Isaac Smith, later recommissioned in the Confederate Navy the Stono in the expedition on Morris Island. When Union troops took the southern end of the Island, Smalls was put in charge of the Light House Inlet as pilot.

On December 1, 1863, Smalls was piloting the Planter under Captain James Nickerson on Folly Island Creek when Confederate batteries at Secessionville opened fire. Nickerson fled the pilot house for the coal-bunker. Smalls refused to surrender, fearing that the African-American crewmen would not be treated as prisoners of war and instead be summarily killed. Smalls entered the pilothouse and took command of the boat and piloted it to safety. For this, he was reportedly promoted by Gillmore to the rank of captain and made acting captain of the Planter.

In May 1864, he was voted an unofficial delegate to the Republican National Convention in Baltimore. Later that spring, Smalls piloted the Planter to Philadelphia for an overhaul. In Philadelphia, he supported what was known as the Port Royal Experiment, an effort to raise money to support the education and development of formerly enslaved people. At the outset of the Civil War, Smalls could neither read nor write, but he achieved literacy in Philadelphia. In 1864, Smalls was seated in a streetcar in Philadelphia and was ordered to give his seat to a white passenger. Rather than ride on the open overflow platform, Smalls left the car. This incident of humiliating a heroic veteran was cited in the debate that resulted in the Pennsylvania legislature's passing a bill to integrate public transportation in Pennsylvania in 1867.

In December 1864, Smalls and the Planter moved to support William T. Sherman's army in Savannah, Georgia at the destination point of his March to the Sea. Smalls returned with the Planter to Charleston harbor in April 1865 for the ceremonial raising of the American flag again at Fort Sumter. Smalls was discharged on June 11, 1865. Other vessels that Smalls piloted during the war included the Huron and the Paul Jones. He continued to pilot the Planter, serving a humanitarian mission of taking food and supplies to freedmen who had lost their homes and livelihoods during the war. On September 30, the Planter entered the service of the Freedmen's Bureau.

=== Commission and prize money ===
Smalls's position in the Union Army and Navy has been disputed, and his reward for the capture of the Planter has been criticized. During his life, articles about Smalls state that, when he was assigned to pilot the Planter, the Navy did not allow him to hold the rank of pilot because he was not a graduate of a naval academy, a requirement at that time. To assure that he received proper pay for a captain, he was commissioned second lieutenant of the 1st South Carolina Colored Infantry Regiment (later re-designated as the 33rd U.S. Colored Infantry) and detailed to act as pilot. Many sources also state that General Gillmore promoted Smalls to captain in December 1863 after he saved the Planter when it was under attack near Secessionville. Later sources state that Smalls did receive a commission either in the Army or the Navy, but that he likely was officially a civilian throughout the war. In 1865, his salary as "commander" of the Planter was given in a newspaper as $1,800 (equivalent to $37,859 in 2025); he and the Planter were in Charleston harbor with the Union ships in 1865 and transported from shore all of the African Americans who wanted to attend the flag-raising ceremony at Ft. Sumter.

Later in his life, when Smalls sought a Navy pension, he learned that he had not been officially commissioned. He claimed that he had received an official commission from Gillmore but had lost it. In 1883, a bill passed committee to put him on the Navy retired list, but in the end it was halted, allegedly due to Smalls being African American. In 1897, a special act of Congress granted Smalls a pension of $30 per month, equal to the pension for a Navy captain.

In 1883, during discussion of the bill to put Smalls on the Navy retired list, a report stated that the 1862 appraisal of the Planter was "absurdly low" and that a fair valuation would have been more than $60,000. However, Smalls received no further payment until 1900. That year, Congress passed a statute paying Smalls $5,000, less the amount paid to him in 1862 ($1,500), for his capture of the steamship. Many still felt that this was less than his due.

== After the Civil War ==
Immediately following the war, Smalls returned to his native Beaufort, where he purchased his former enslaver's house at 511 Prince St., which Union tax authorities had seized in 1863 for refusal to pay taxes. Later, the former owner sued to regain the property, but Smalls retained ownership in the court case. The case became an important precedent in other, similar cases. His mother, Lydia, lived with him for the remainder of her life. He later allowed his former enslaver's wife, the elderly Jane McKee, to move into her former home prior to her death.

Smalls spent nine months learning to read and write. He purchased a two-story Beaumont building to use as a school for African-American children.

=== Business ventures ===
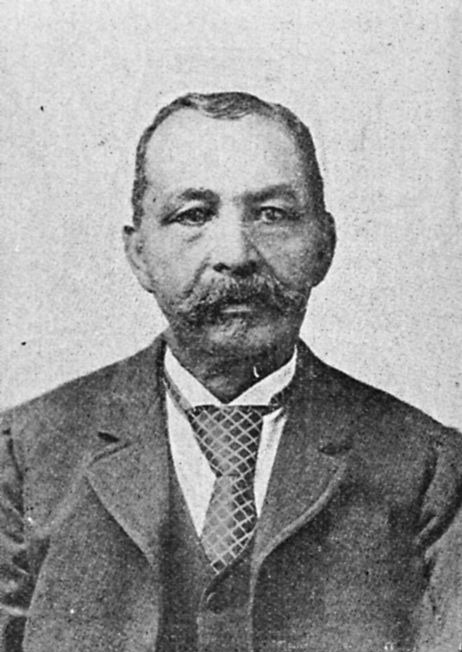
Richard Gleaves, Smalls's business partner after the war

In 1866, Smalls went into business in Beaufort with Richard Howell Gleaves, a businessman from Philadelphia. They opened a store to serve the needs of freedmen. Smalls also hired a teacher to help him study. That April, the Radical Republicans that controlled Congress overrode President Andrew Johnson's vetoes and passed a Civil Rights Act. In 1868, they passed the 14th Amendment, which was ratified by the states to extend full citizenship to all Americans regardless of race.

Smalls invested significantly in the economic development of the Charleston–Beaufort region. In 1870, in anticipation of a Reconstruction-based prosperity, Smalls, with fellow representatives Joseph Rainey, Alonzo Ransier and others, formed the Enterprise Railroad, an 18-mile horse-drawn railway line that carried cargo and passengers between the Charleston wharves and inland depots. (Note: Its route was planned to run along the wharves from White Point Garden in the Battery north along East Bay Street to Calhoun Street and into the city, northwest to "Ten Mile Hill," near the present Charleston International Airport.) Except for one white director (newspaper editor, legislator and county treasurer Timothy Hurley), the railroad's board of directors was entirely African American. Richard H. Cain was its first president. Author Bernard E. Powers describes it as "the most impressive commercial venture by members of Charleston's black elite." Smalls owned and helped publish a newspaper, the Beaufort Southern Standard, starting in 1872.

== Political career ==
Smalls's wartime fame and his fluency in the Gullah dialect gave him an avenue for political advancement.

=== Political affiliation ===
Smalls was one of the founders of the South Carolina Republican Party. The Republican Party was the political party that dominated the Northern states and passed laws granting protections for African Americans in the aftermath of the Civil War. On August 22, 1912, Smalls wrote to U.S. Senator Knute Nelson: "I never lose sight of the fact that had it not been for the Republican Party, I never would have been an office-holder of any kind—from 1862 to the present." In words that became famous, he described his party as "the party of Lincoln...which unshackled the necks of four million human beings." He wrote this line on September 12, 1912, in a letter expressing his anxiety over the looming presidential election. In that letter, he concluded: "I ask that every colored man in the North who has a vote to cast would cast that vote for the regular Republican Party and thus bury the Democratic Party so deep that there will not be seen even a bubble coming from the spot where the burial took place."

=== State politics ===
Smalls was a delegate at the 1868 South Carolina Constitutional Convention, where he worked to make free, compulsory schooling available to all South Carolina children. He served as a delegate at several Republican National Conventions, and he also participated in the South Carolina Republican State conventions.

In 1868, Smalls was elected as the first black member of the South Carolina House of Representatives. He was very effective, introducing a Homestead Act and a Civil Rights bill, the latter of which he worked to pass. In 1870, Jonathan Jasper Wright was elected judge of the South Carolina Supreme Court and Smalls was elected to fill his unexpired time in the state Senate. He continued in the Senate, winning the 1872 election against W. J. Whipper. In the Senate, he was considered a very good speaker and debater. He served on the Finance Committee and was chairman of the Public Printing Committee.

Smalls was a delegate to three National Republican Conventions: in 1872 in Philadelphia, which nominated the incumbent President Grant for re-election; in 1876 in Cincinnati, which nominated Hayes; and in 1884 in Chicago, which nominated Blaine—and then continuously to all conventions until 1896. He was elected vice-president of the South Carolina Republican Party at its 1872 state convention.

In 1873, Smalls was appointed lieutenant-colonel of the Third Regiment, South Carolina State Militia. He was later promoted to brigadier-general of the Second Brigade, South Carolina Militia, and to major-general of the Second Division, South Carolina State Militia. He held this position until 1877, when Democrats took control of the state government.

=== National politics ===
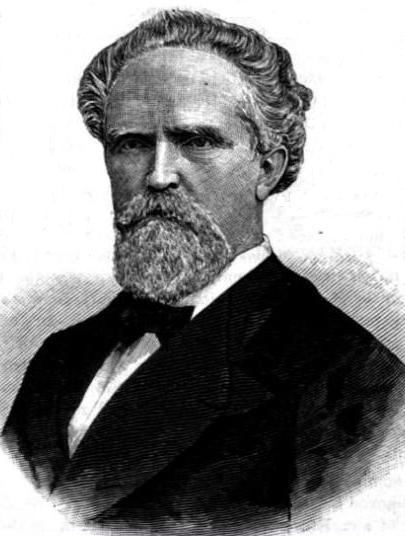
George D. Tillman, one of Smalls's chief rivals in Congressional races

In 1874, Smalls was elected to the United States House of Representatives, where he served two terms from 1875 to 1879. From 1882 to 1883, he represented South Carolina's 5th congressional district in the House. The state legislature gerrymandered district boundaries, thereby including Beaufort and other heavily African-American coastal areas in South Carolina's 7th congressional district, and providing other nearby districts substantial white majorities. Smalls was elected from the 7th district and served from 1884 to 1887. He was a member of the 44th, 45th, 47th, 48th and 49th U.S. Congresses.

In 1875, he opposed the transfer of troops out of the American South, fearing the effect of such a move on the safety of African Americans in the region. During consideration of a bill to reduce and restructure the United States Army, Smalls introduced an amendment that provided that "[h]ereafter in the enlistment of men in the Army...no distinction whatsoever shall be made on account of race or color." However, the amendment was not considered by Congress. He was the last Republican elected from the 5th congressional district until 2010, when Mick Mulvaney took office. He was the second-longest serving African-American member of Congress (behind Joseph Rainey) until the mid-20th century.

After the Compromise of 1877, the U.S. government withdrew its remaining forces from South Carolina and other Southern states. Conservative Southern Bourbon Democrats had used violence and election fraud to regain control of the state legislature. As part of wide-ranging Democratic Party efforts to reduce African-American political power, Smalls was charged and convicted of taking a bribe five years earlier in connection with the awarding of a printing contract. He was pardoned as part of an agreement by which charges were also dropped against Democrats accused of election fraud.

The scandal took a political toll on Smalls, and he was defeated by Democrat George D. Tillman in 1878, and again, narrowly, in 1880. He successfully contested the 1880 result and regained the seat in 1882. In 1884, he was elected to fill a seat in a different district. He was nominated for Senate but defeated by Wade Hampton in December 1884. During this period in Congress, he supported racial-integration legislation, supported a pension for the widow of his former Major General, David Hunter, and advised South Carolina African Americans to refrain from migrating to the Northern or Midwestern United States or to Liberia.

In 1890, he was appointed by President Benjamin Harrison as collector of the Port of Beaufort, a position that he held until 1913 except during Democrat Grover Cleveland's second term. Smalls was active into the twentieth century. He was "the leading colored delegate" to the 1895 South Carolina constitutional convention. Together with five other African-American politicians, he strongly opposed the dominant Democratic delegates as they implacably wrote disfranchisement of the state's African-American citizens into the proposed constitution. Seeking to publicize this blatantly discriminatory clause, they wrote an article for the New York World. However, they were outnumbered at the state convention, and the new constitution was adopted. For many decades, this state constitution survived legal challenges, resulting in both the exclusion of African Americans from political participation and the crippling of the Republican Party throughout South Carolina.

In the late 1890s, Smalls began to suffer from diabetes. He turned down an offer of a colonelcy of an African-American U.S. military regiment in the Spanish–American War and an appointment to the position of minister to Liberia.

=== Local politics ===
Though Smalls was not officially involved with politics on the local level, he had some influence. In 1913, in one of his final actions as community leader, he played an important role in stopping a lynch mob from killing two black suspects in the murder of a white man. He pressured the mayor, saying that blacks that he had sent throughout the city would burn the town if the mob was not stopped. The mayor and sheriff stopped the mob.

== Family ==
With his first wife Hannah Jones Smalls, whom he married on December 24, 1856, Robert Smalls had three children: Elizabeth Lydia (1858–1959; m. Samuel Jones Bampfield, nine living children); Robert Jr., who was born in 1861, and died at age two; and Sarah Voorhies (1863–1920). Hannah Jones Smalls had two daughters before she met and married Robert Smalls: Charlotte and Clara Jones. Smalls and his family were affiliated with the Baptist Church and attended Berean Baptist Church when living in Washington, D.C. Smalls was a Prince Hall mason as a member of Sons of Beaufort Lodge #36. Smalls's great-great-grandson, Michael B. Moore, was the unsuccessful Democratic nominee for South Carolina's 1st congressional district in 2024.

Hannah Smalls died on July 28, 1883. On April 9, 1890, Robert Smalls married Annie E. Wigg, a Charleston schoolteacher, who bore him one son, William Robert Smalls (1892–1970). Annie Smalls died on November 5, 1895.

Robert Smalls died of malaria and diabetes on February 23, 1915, at the age of 75. He was buried in his family's plot in the churchyard of the Tabernacle Baptist Church in downtown Beaufort. The monument to Smalls in this churchyard is inscribed with his 1895 statement to the South Carolina legislature: "My race needs no special defense, for the past history of them in this country proves them to be the equal of any people anywhere. All they need is an equal chance in the battle of life."

== Honors and legacy ==
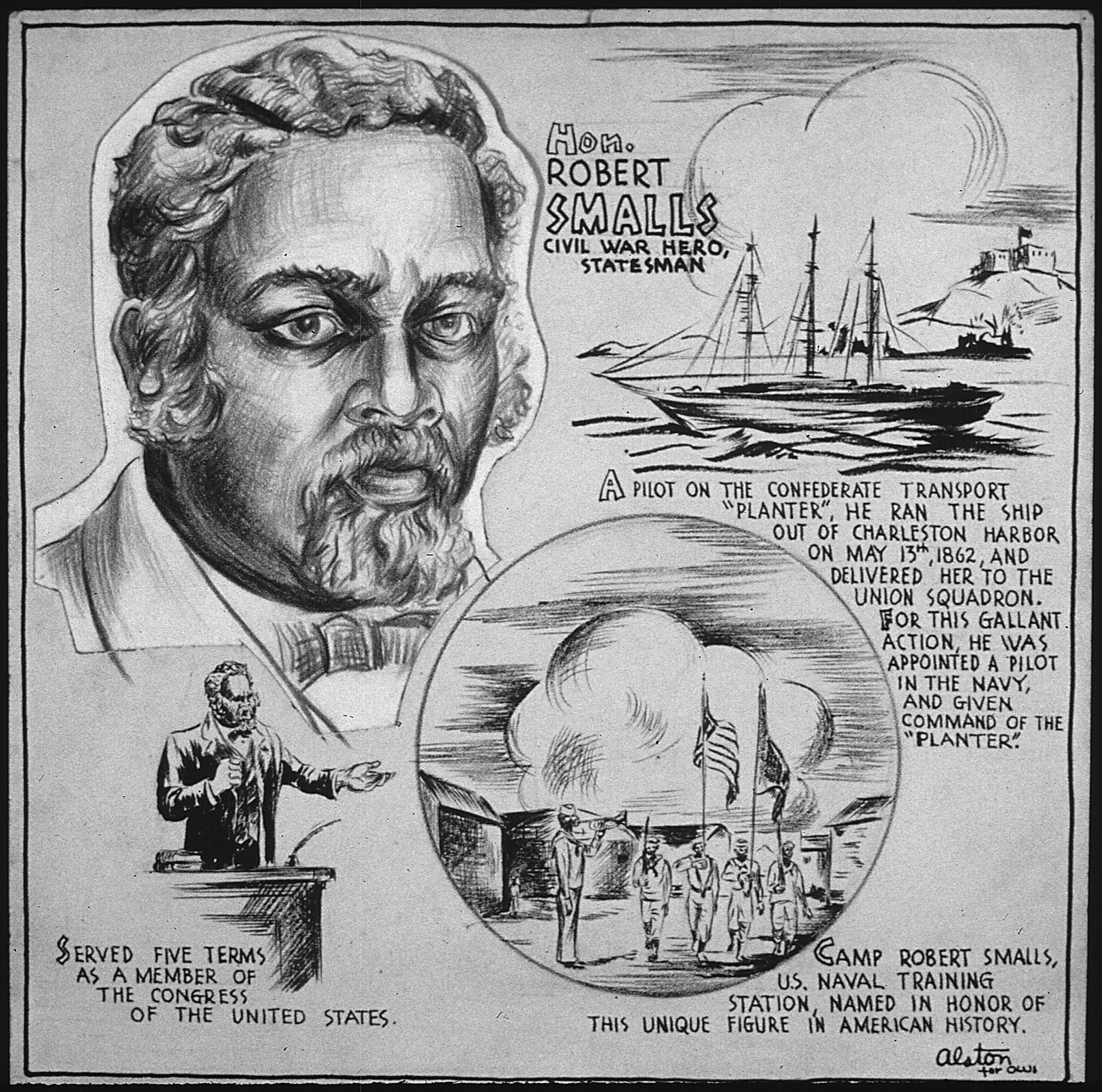
Illustration of Smalls by Charles Alston

- Since 2023, the state of South Carolina has celebrated Robert Smalls Day every May 13.
- Fort Robert Smalls was named in his honor; it was built by free blacks in 1863 on McGuire's Hill on the South Side of Pittsburgh during the Civil War. It survived until the 1940s.
- The Robert Smalls House in Beaufort has been designated a National Historic Landmark.
- A monument and statue are dedicated to his memory where he is interred at Tabernacle Baptist Church in Beaufort.
- The Robert Smalls School in Cheraw, South Carolina is named for him.
- The Robert Smalls Leadership Academy (formerly the Robert Smalls Middle School) in Beaufort County, South Carolina is named in his honor.
- During World War II, Camp Robert Smalls was established as a sub-facility of the Great Lakes Naval Training Center to train black sailors (the Navy was segregated at that time).
- The Verdier House museum in Beaufort has an exhibit on Smalls.
- In 2004, the United States named a ship for Smalls, the USAV Major General Robert Smalls (LSV-8), a Kuroda-class logistics support vessel operated by the U.S. Army. It was the first Army ship named after an African American.
- Charleston held commemorative ceremonies in 2012 on the 150th anniversary of Smalls' escape on the Planter, with special programs on May 12 and 13.
- Robert Smalls Parkway is a five-mile section of South Carolina Highway 170 that crosses Port Royal Island and leads into Beaufort.
- A statue of Smalls is in the U.S. National Museum of African American History and Culture.
- Waterfront Park in Charleston contains a small pedestal with a plaque explaining Smalls' contributions to the area.
- A proposal was put forward to create a statue of Smalls to be installed at the South Carolina State House. Governor Henry McMaster held a ceremonial signing of the bill on August 29, 2024. The Robert Smalls Monument Commission held its first meeting on that day, to proceed with planning the monument. Current members of the Commission include South Carolina Representatives Wendell Gilliard, Jermaine Johnson, Brandon Cox, Patrick Haddon and Sylleste Davis; South Carolina Senators on the Commission include Tom Davis, Margie Bright Matthews, Shane Massey, Chip Campsen and Darrell Jackson.
- In 2019, Amazon announced that it was developing a biopic with director Charles Burnett. In 2021, it was announced that Malcolm Mays was rewriting the script.
- A biopic of Smalls is being developed by Legion M, Wolper Corporation and Bill Duke, entitled "Defiant".
- On March 1, 2023, the Navy renamed USS Chancellorsville to USS Robert Smalls after Smalls, based on a recommendation from The Naming Commission.
- The story of Smalls was featured in the Drunk History episode, "Charleston" (Season 2, Episode 5).

== See also ==
- List of African-American United States representatives
- List of slaves

== Explanatory notes ==
U.S. House of Representatives
Constituency reestablished	Member of the U.S. House of Representatives from South Carolina's 5th congressional district 1875–79	Succeeded by George D. Tillman
Preceded by George D. Tillman	Member of the U.S. House of Representatives from South Carolina's 5th congressional district 1882–83	Succeeded by John J. Hemphill
Preceded by Edmund W. M. Mackey	Member of the U.S. House of Representatives from South Carolina's 7th congressional district 1884–87	Succeeded by William Elliott
