= George D. Tillman =

American politician (1826–1902)

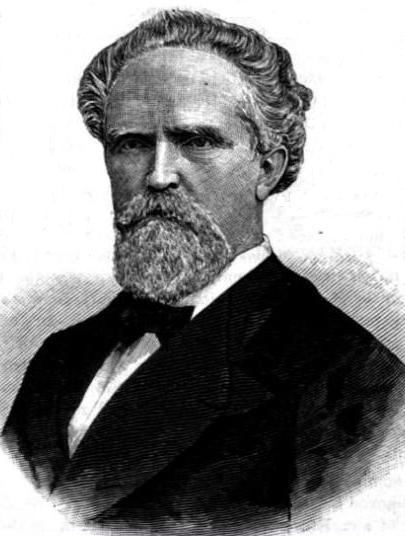

Member of the U.S. House of Representatives from South Carolina's 2nd district
- In office March 4, 1883 – March 3, 1893
- Preceded by: Edmund W.M. Mackey
- Succeeded by: W. Jasper Talbert

Member of the U.S. House of Representatives from South Carolina's 5th district
- In office March 4, 1879 – July 19, 1882
- Preceded by: Robert Smalls
- Succeeded by: Robert Smalls

Member of the South Carolina Senate from Edgefield County
- In office November 27, 1865 – December 21, 1866
- Preceded by: Thomas Glascock Bacon
- Succeeded by: Franz Walburg von Arnim

Member of the South Carolina House of Representatives from Edgefield District
- In office November 28, 1864 – December 22, 1864
- In office November 27, 1854 – December 19, 1855

Personal details
- Born: George Dionysius Tillman; August 21, 1826 Curryton, South Carolina
- Died: February 2, 1902 (aged 75) Clarks Hill, South Carolina
- Party: Democratic
- Education: Harvard University
- Profession: Attorney, politician

Military service
- Allegiance: Confederate States of America
- Branch/service: Confederate States Army
- Years of service: 1862–1865
- Battles/wars: American Civil War

George Dionysius Tillman (August 21, 1826 – February 2, 1902) was a Democratic politician from South Carolina. He was a state representative, state senator, and U.S. Representative. He was the brother of Governor Benjamin Ryan Tillman, and father of James H. Tillman, who was Lieutenant Governor of South Carolina from 1901 to 1903 and in the latter year shot newspaper editor Narciso Gener Gonzales and was acquitted.

== Early life ==
He was born near Curryton, South Carolina, and attended schools in Penfield, Georgia, and in Greenwood, South Carolina. He attended Harvard University but did not graduate. He studied law, was admitted to the bar in 1848, and commenced practice in Edgefield, South Carolina. During the American Civil War, he enlisted in the Confederate States Army. He served in the 3rd South Carolina Infantry Regiment in 1862. After the 3rd South Carolina was disbanded, he joined the 2nd South Carolina Artillery, in which he served until the close of the war.

== Political career ==
He served as a state representative from 1854 to 1855 and in 1864. He served as member of the State constitutional convention in 1865, held under the Reconstruction proclamation of President Andrew Johnson. He then served as a state senator in 1865.

He was an unsuccessful candidate for election in 1876 to the Forty-fifth Congress. Tillman was elected as a Democrat to the Forty-sixth Congress from the Fifth district (1879–1881), and re-elected to the Forty-seventh Congress (1881–1883). He served from March 3, 1881, to June 19, 1882, when his election was overturned by the House. Republican Robert Smalls, his African-American opponent in 1880, contested the election, and succeeded Tillman.

Tillman was elected to the Forty-eighth Congress from the Second district and to the four succeeding Congresses (1883–1893). He served as chairman of the Committee on Patents in the Fifty-second Congress. He was an unsuccessful candidate for renomination in 1892. He served as member of the State constitutional convention in 1895, and was an unsuccessful candidate for election as Governor of South Carolina in 1898.

Besides his political and legal activities, he engaged in agricultural pursuits and also worked as a publicist.

He died in Clarks Hill, McCormick County, South Carolina, on February 2, 1902, and was interred in the Bethlehem Baptist Church Community Cemetery.

== Sources ==
- United States Congress. "George D. Tillman (id: T000275)". Biographical Directory of the United States Congress.

U.S. House of Representatives
Preceded by Robert Smalls	Member of the U.S. House of Representatives from South Carolina's 5th congressional district 1879-1882	Succeeded by Robert Smalls
Preceded by Edmund W. M. Mackey	Member of the U.S. House of Representatives from South Carolina's 2nd congressional district 1883–1893	Succeeded by W. Jasper Talbert
