= 1870 United States House of Representatives elections in South Carolina =

The 1870 United States House of Representatives elections in South Carolina were held on November 1, 1870, to select six Representatives for two-year terms from the state of South Carolina. The fifth and sixth seats were decided by an at-large election, but the House of Representatives refused to seat the two winners. The two incumbents who ran were re-elected and the two open seats were retained by the Republicans. The composition of the state delegation thus remained solely Republican.

== 1st congressional district special election ==
The seat for the 1st congressional district became vacant following the resignation of Republican Benjamin F. Whittemore in February 1870. A special election was called to be held simultaneously with the regular election and Republican Joseph Rainey defeated Democrat C.W. Dudley to serve the remainder of the term for the 41st Congress.

=== General election results ===
South Carolina's 1st congressional district special election results, 1870
| Party | Candidate | Votes | % | ±% |
|---|---|---|---|---|
| Republican | Joseph Rainey | 20,385 | 86.5 | |
| Democratic | C.W. Dudley | 3,192 | 13.5 | |
| Majority | | 17,193 | 73.0 | |
| Turnout | | 23,577 | | |
| Republican hold | | | | |

== 1st congressional district ==
Republican Joseph Rainey defeated Democrat C.W. Dudley in the regular election for the 1st congressional district to win the term for the 42nd Congress.

=== General election results ===
South Carolina's 1st congressional district election results, 1870
| Party | Candidate | Votes | % | ±% |
|---|---|---|---|---|
| Republican | Joseph Rainey | 20,221 | 63.5 | −23.0 |
| Democratic | C.W. Dudley | 11,628 | 36.5 | +23.0 |
| No party | Write-Ins | 9 | 0.0 | 0.0 |
| Majority | | 8,593 | 27.0 | −46.0 |
| Turnout | | 31,858 | | |
| Republican hold | | | | |

== 2nd congressional district ==
Incumbent Republican Congressman Christopher C. Bowen of the 2nd congressional district, in office since 1868, was defeated by black Republican Robert C. De Large in the general election.

=== General election results ===
South Carolina's 2nd congressional district election results, 1870
| Party | Candidate | Votes | % | ±% |
|---|---|---|---|---|
| Republican | Robert C. De Large | 16,686 | 49.6 | |
| Republican | Christopher C. Bowen (incumbent) | 15,700 | 46.7 | |
| Union Reform | Robert Seymour Symmes Tharin | 862 | 2.6 | |
| No party | Write-Ins | 364 | 1.1 | |
| Majority | | 986 | 2.9 | |
| Turnout | | 33,612 | | |
| Republican hold | | | | |

== 3rd congressional district ==
Incumbent Republican Congressman Solomon L. Hoge of the 3rd congressional district, in office since 1869, declined to run for re-election. Robert B. Elliott was nominated by the Republicans and defeated Union Reform challenger John E. Bacon in the general election.

=== General election results ===
South Carolina's 3rd congressional district election results, 1870
| Party | Candidate | Votes | % | ±% |
|---|---|---|---|---|
| Republican | Robert B. Elliott | 20,564 | 59.5 | |
| Union Reform | John E. Bacon | 13,997 | 40.5 | |
| No party | Write-Ins | 4 | 0.0 | |
| Majority | | 6,567 | 19.0 | |
| Turnout | | 34,565 | | |
| Republican hold | | | | |

== 4th congressional district ==
Incumbent Republican Congressman Alexander S. Wallace of the 4th congressional district, in office since 1870, defeated Democratic challenger Isaac G. McKissick.

=== General election results ===
South Carolina's 4th congressional district election results, 1870
| Party | Candidate | Votes | % | ±% |
|---|---|---|---|---|
| Republican | Alexander S. Wallace (incumbent) | 16,747 | 55.3 | |
| Democratic | Isaac G. McKissick | 13,442 | 44.4 | |
| No party | Write-Ins | 106 | 0.3 | |
| Majority | | 3,305 | 10.9 | |
| Turnout | | 30,295 | | |
| Republican hold | | | | |

== At-large district ==
The state believed that it was entitled to two additional seats in the House of Representatives and elected these members from an At-large congressional district. The voters voted for two candidates and the top two vote getters would be sent to Washington, but there were only two candidates running in the at-large election. White Republican J. P. M. Epping and black Republican Lucius Wimbush won the election, but the House of Representatives refused to seat them.

=== General election results ===
South Carolina's at-large congressional district election results, 1870
| Party | Candidate | Votes | % | ±% |
|---|---|---|---|---|
| Republican | Johann Peter Martin Epping | 71,321 | 50.0 | |
| Republican | Lucius Wimbush | 71,262 | 50.0 | |
| Turnout | | 142,583 | | |
| Republican win | | | | |

== See also ==
- United States House of Representatives elections, 1870
- South Carolina gubernatorial election, 1870
- South Carolina's congressional districts
