= 1874 United States House of Representatives elections in South Carolina =

The 1874 South Carolina United States House of Representatives elections were held on November 3, 1874, to select five Representatives for two-year terms from the state of South Carolina. Two incumbents were re-elected, two open seats were retained by the Republicans, and the open seat in the 2nd congressional district was picked up by the Independent Republicans. The composition of the state delegation after the election was four Republicans and one Independent Republican.

== 1st congressional district ==
Incumbent Republican Congressman Joseph Rainey of the 1st congressional district, in office since 1870, defeated Independent Republican Samuel Lee.

=== General election results ===
South Carolina's 1st congressional district election results, 1874
Party	Candidate	Votes	%	±%
Republican	Joseph Rainey (incumbent)	14,360	51.4	−48.6
Independent Republican	Samuel Lee	13,563	48.6	+48.6
No party	Write-Ins	3	0.0	0.0
Majority		797	2.8	−97.2
Turnout		27,926		
Republican hold				

== 2nd congressional district ==
Incumbent Republican Congressman Alonzo J. Ransier of the 2nd congressional district, in office since 1873, declined to run for re-election. Independent Republican Edmund William McGregor Mackey defeated Republican Charles W. Buttz in the general election.

=== General election results ===
South Carolina's 2nd congressional district election results, 1874
Party	Candidate	Votes	%	±%
Independent Republican	Edmund W.M. Mackey	16,746	54.1	+29.5
Republican	Charles W. Buttz	14,204	45.9	−29.5
No party	Write-Ins	5	0.0	0.0
Majority		2,542	8.2	−42.6
Turnout		30,955		
Independent Republican gain from Republican				

== 3rd congressional district Special Election ==
Incumbent Republican Congressman Robert B. Elliott of the 3rd congressional district, in office since 1871, resigned in 1874 so that he could return to South Carolina and stem the massive corruption on the part of the state Republican Party. A special election was called to be held simultaneously with the regular election. Lewis C. Carpenter was nominated by the Republicans and was unopposed in the special election.

=== General election results ===
South Carolina's 3rd congressional district Special election results, 1874
Party	Candidate	Votes	%	±%
Republican	Lewis C. Carpenter	20,648	99.6	+7.1
No party	Write-Ins	87	0.4	−7.1
Majority		20,561	99.2	+11.6
Turnout		20,735		
Republican hold				

== 3rd congressional district ==
Solomon L. Hoge was nominated by the Republicans for the regular election of the 3rd congressional district and he defeated Conservative challenger Samuel McGowan.

=== General election results ===
South Carolina's 3rd congressional district election results, 1874
Party	Candidate	Votes	%	±%
Republican	Solomon L. Hoge	16,431	56.1	−43.5
Conservative	Samuel McGowan	12,873	43.9	+43.9
Majority		3,558	12.2	−87.0
Turnout		29,304		
Republican hold				

== 4th congressional district ==
Incumbent Republican Congressman Alexander S. Wallace of the 4th congressional district, in office since 1870, defeated Conservative challenger Joseph B. Kershaw.

=== General election results ===
South Carolina's 4th congressional district election results, 1874
Party	Candidate	Votes	%	±%
Republican	Alexander S. Wallace (incumbent)	16,452	53.2	+0.1
Conservative	Joseph B. Kershaw	14,455	46.8	+46.8
Majority		1,997	6.4	+0.2
Turnout		30,907		
Republican hold				

== 5th congressional district ==
Robert Smalls was nominated by the Republicans for the newly created 5th congressional district and he defeated Independent Republican J. P. M. Epping.

=== General election results ===
South Carolina's 5th congressional district election results, 1874
Party	Candidate	Votes	%	±%
Republican	Robert Smalls	17,752	79.4	N/A
Independent Republican	Johann Peter Martin Epping	4,461	19.9	N/A
No party	Write-Ins	149	0.7	N/A
Majority		13,291	59.5	N/A
Turnout		22,362		
Republican gain				

== See also ==
- United States House of Representatives elections, 1874
- South Carolina gubernatorial election, 1874
- South Carolina's congressional districts
