= Samuel E. Gaillard =

South Carolina politician

Member of the South Carolina Senate
- In office 1871 – Oct. 15, 1877
- Preceded by: William H. Mishaw
- Succeeded by: James Butler Campbell
- Constituency: Charleston County

Personal details
- Born: 1839 Charleston, South Carolina
- Died: April 13, 1879 (40) Monrovia, Liberia
- Party: Republican

Samuel Eden Gaillard (c. 1839–1879) was an African-American businessman and politician during the Reconstruction era in South Carolina. He represented Charleston County in the state senate from 1871 until 1877, when he resigned after Democrats regained control of South Carolina and engaged in a purge of Republicans.

== Political career ==
Gaillard entered public service through employment by the Freedmen's Bureau, a federal agency established in 1865 to aid formerly-enslaved people living in the American South.

In 1867, Gaillard was appointed to the Board of Registers for the third district in modern-day Berkeley County, which was part of Charleston County at the time. In this role, he was in charge of organizing elections in the area.

He was a Citizen's Party (Union Reform Party of South Carolina) nominee for Alderman in 1871.

During the 1872 South Carolina gubernatorial election, Gaillard "bolted" from the Republican Party's nominee and supported the Independent Republican ticket, which was formed to oppose the election of Governor Franklin Moses Jr. and push efforts to reform the state government. This became known as the "1872 Bolting Movement".

=== State senate ===
In 1871, Gaillard was elected to the state Senate seat vacated by the death of William H. Mishaw. Richard H. Cain, a prominent African American state Senator, protested his ascension into the state senate.

In the aftermath of the Disputed government crisis of 1876-77, and with the Democratic Party gaining control of the state legislature, Republican members were pushed to resign. Gaillard, along with five other Republican Senators, resigned from the state senate at the beginning of the 1877-78 session. He was succeeded by Democrat James Butler Campbell.

=== Chairmanship of the state orphan asylum ===
In 1873, Gaillard became Chairman of the Board of Trustees for the state orphan asylum. He held that position until May 13, 1875. Once Democrats regained control of the legislature in the wake of the 1876-77 crisis, a joint committee investigated allegations of fraud during Gaillard's tenure.

On August 16, 1877, a South Carolina judge found that in 1874 Gaillard and the Freedman's Savings and Trust Company mismanaged asylum funds held by the back in trust, and ordered restitution be paid to the Secretary of State pursuant to state law.

== Personal life ==
Gaillard was a Republican, served in the state militia, and chaired the Charleston County Republican Party in 1874.

He was a land speculator, owning property in St. James Goose Creek. He also invested in the incorporation of the Charleston and Sullivan's Island Railroad in 1874.

Opposing Martin R. Delany's call for African Americans to represent African American voters, he stated, "Prudence would dictate as a motto 'The best man' be he as black as it is possible to be, or as white as a lily, if he will carry out the principles of Republicanism."

He helped organize a business for African Americans to colonize Liberia. He died on April 13, 1879, in Monrovia, a year after moving there.

== See also ==
- African American officeholders from the end of the Civil War until before 1900
- Reconstruction in South Carolina
