= 1872 South Carolina gubernatorial election =

- October 16, 1872
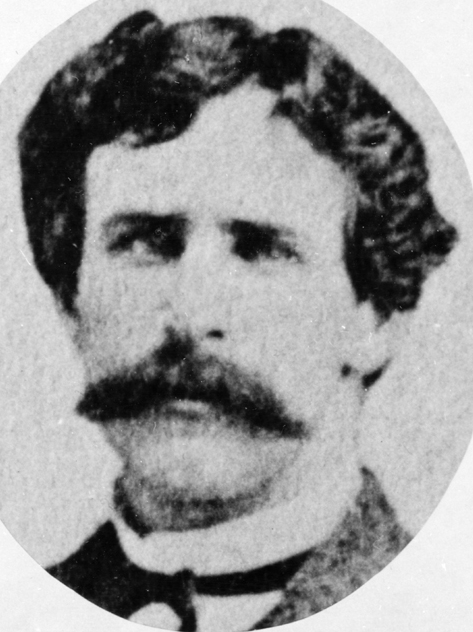

| Nominee | Franklin J. Moses, Jr. | Reuben Tomlinson |
| Party | Republican | Independent Republican |
| Alliance | - | Democratic |
| Popular vote | 69,838 | 36,533 |
| Percentage | 65.44% | 34.23% |
- County results Moses: 50–60% 60–70% 70–80% 80–90% 90–100% Tomlinson: 50–60% 60–70% 70–80% 80–90%
Governor before election
Robert Kingston Scott
Republican
Elected Governor
Franklin J. Moses, Jr.
Republican

The 1872 South Carolina gubernatorial election was held on October 16, 1872, to select the governor of the state of South Carolina. Franklin J. Moses, Jr. won the election as a Radical Republican against the more moderate faction of the Republican Party and became the 75th governor of South Carolina.

== Campaign ==
Republican nomination for Governor
| Candidate | Votes | % |
|---|---|---|
| Franklin J. Moses, Jr. | 69 | 58.5 |
| Samuel W. Melton | 18 | 15.2 |
| Daniel Henry Chamberlain | 16 | 13.6 |
| Reuben Tomlinson | 15 | 12.7 |

The state Republicans met in Columbia for their nominating convention on August 21 through August 24. There were 115 black and 33 white delegates to the convention, many of them calling for reform in state government. The nomination for Governor proceeded after the organization of the convention and five men were mentioned, but Franklin J. Moses, Jr. was seen as the clear favorite.

Immediately, accusations of bribery were pegged against each candidate. Former Governor Orr accused Moses of offering a delegate from Barnwell $2,000 for his vote. Tomlinson was alleged by Judge Thomas Mackey to have been giving bribes to ensure the passage of the phosphate bill in 1870.

A vote was taken for the nomination of Governor during the commotion over the accusations of bribery and Moses emerged as the clear winner from the other contenders. Orr denounced the selection and led a walkout by some of the delegates from the convention. The Republican platform adopted at the convention called for a reduction in expenditures and financial reform.

Assembling at the Richland courthouse on August 22, Orr directed the formation of an Independent Republican ticket for the general election in October. Reuben Tomlinson was nominated for Governor and half of the Independent Republican slate for statewide office were black men. The platform consisted entirely of opposing Moses and advocating for reform in state government.

== General election ==
The general election was held on October 16, 1872, and Franklin J. Moses, Jr. was elected as governor of South Carolina by a wide margin. Turnout was lower than the previous election because it was mainly a contest between Republicans; it was estimated that approximately 40,000 white voters did not cast a ballot in the election.

South Carolina Gubernatorial Election, 1872
| Party | Candidate | Votes | % | ±% |
|---|---|---|---|---|
| Republican | Franklin J. Moses, Jr. | 69,838 | 65.4 | +3.1 |
| Independent Republican | Reuben Tomlinson | 36,533 | 34.3 | +34.3 |
| No party | Write-Ins | 351 | 0.3 | +0.3 |
| Majority | | 33,285 | 31.1 | +6.5 |
| Turnout | | 106,742 | | |
| Republican hold | | | | |

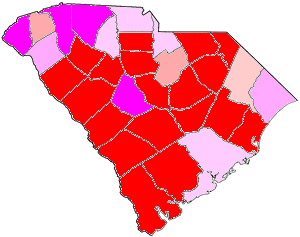
1872 South Carolina gubernatorial election map, by percentile by county. 65+% won by Moses 55%-59% won by Moses 50%-54% won by Moses 50%-54% won by Tomlinson 55%-59% won by Tomlinson 65+% won by Tomlinson

== See also ==
- Governor of South Carolina
- List of governors of South Carolina
- South Carolina gubernatorial elections

| Preceded by 1870 | South Carolina gubernatorial elections | Succeeded by 1874 |
