= 1874 South Carolina gubernatorial election =

- November 3, 1874
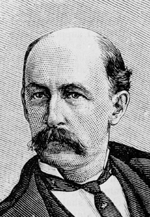

Nominee	Daniel Henry Chamberlain	John T. Green
Party	Republican	Independent Republican
Alliance	-	Democratic
Popular vote	80,403	68,818
Percentage	53.87%	46.11%
- County results Chamberlain: 50–60% 60–70% 70–80% Green: 50–60% 60–70% 70–80% 80–90%
Governor before election
Franklin J. Moses, Jr.
Republican
Elected Governor
Daniel Henry Chamberlain
Republican

The 1874 South Carolina gubernatorial election was held on November 3, 1874, to select the governor and lieutenant governor of the state of South Carolina. Daniel Henry Chamberlain won the election and became the 76th governor of South Carolina.

This was the last a South Carolina gubernatorial election was won by a Republican until 1974.

== Campaign ==
Republican nomination for Governor
Candidate	Votes	%
Daniel Henry Chamberlain	73	59.4
John T. Green	40	32.5
John Winsmith	10	8.1

At the convention of the state Republicans on September 8 through September 11 in Columbia, the delegates felt that reform was vital for the continuation of Republican power. Governor Franklin J. Moses, Jr. was caught up in corruption scandals and never considered as a nominee for reelection to Governor. Instead, Daniel Henry Chamberlain was nominated for Governor and soundly won the nomination.

Chamberlain had been the Attorney General of South Carolina from 1868 to 1872 and pushed for reform of the state government. His association with Radical Republicans such as Senator John J. Patterson and former Governor Robert Kingston Scott enabled him to keep the support of stalwart Republicans while preaching a reform message.

It was this close association with Radical Republicans that again caused a split within the Republican party. The Independent Republicans met in Charleston on October 2 to select candidates for Governor and Lieutenant Governor. John T. Green was chosen to be their nominee for Governor and Martin Delany, a black man, was their candidate for lieutenant governor. The Independent Republicans adopted the Republican platform and the only difference between the two parties was that the Independent Republicans claimed their intention to clean up state government if elected.

The Conservative Party of South Carolina formed in 1874 from the members of the State Tax Union advocating for change. They endorsed the Independent Republican ticket for statewide offices and their platform consisted entirely of restoring honesty and efficiency in state government.

== General election ==
The general election was held on November 3, 1874, and Daniel Henry Chamberlain was elected as governor of South Carolina. Turnout was the highest for a gubernatorial election thus held in South Carolina, although many white voters stayed away from the polls.

South Carolina Gubernatorial Election, 1874
Party	Candidate	Votes	%	±%
Republican	Daniel Henry Chamberlain	80,403	53.9	−11.5
Independent Republican	John T. Green	68,818	46.1	+11.8
No party	Write-Ins	19	0.0	−0.3
Majority		11,585	7.8	−23.3
Turnout		149,240		
Republican hold				

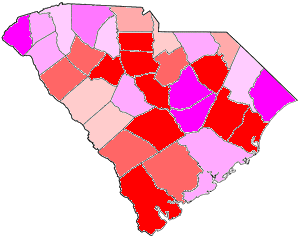
1874 South Carolina gubernatorial election map, by percentile by county. 65+% won by Chamberlain 60%-64% won by Chamberlain 55%-59% won by Chamberlain 50%-54% won by Chamberlain 50%-54% won by Green 55%-59% won by Green 60%-64% won by Green 65+% won by Green

== See also ==
- Governor of South Carolina
- List of governors of South Carolina
- South Carolina gubernatorial elections

Preceded by 1872	South Carolina gubernatorial elections	Succeeded by 1876
