= Solomon L. Hoge =

American judge

Solomon Lafayette Hoge
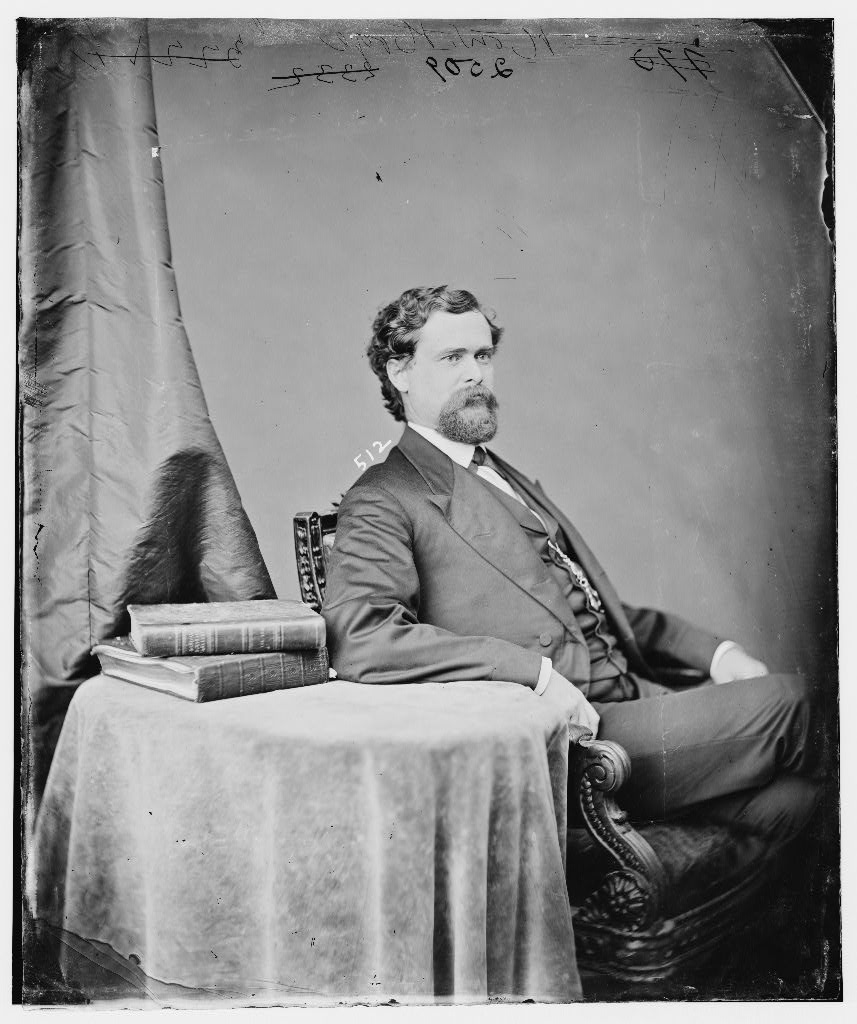

Member of the U.S. House of Representatives from South Carolina's 3rd district
- In office March 4, 1875 – March 3, 1877
- Preceded by: Robert B. Elliott
- Succeeded by: D. Wyatt Aiken
- In office April 8, 1869 – March 3, 1871
- Preceded by: Manuel S. Corley
- Succeeded by: Robert B. Elliott

18th Comptroller General of South Carolina
- In office December 7, 1872 – December 1, 1874
- Governor: Franklin J. Moses, Jr.
- Preceded by: John L. Neagle
- Succeeded by: Thomas C. Dunn

Associate Justice of the South Carolina Supreme Court
- In office 1868–1869
- Preceded by: None (Supreme Court reformed in 1868)
- Succeeded by: Jonathan Jasper Wright

Personal details
- Born: July 11, 1836 Pickrelltown, Ohio
- Died: February 23, 1909 (aged 72) Battle Creek, Michigan
- Resting place: Kenton, Ohio
- Party: Republican
- Education: Geneva College; Cincinnati Law School
- Profession: lawyer, politician, banker

Military service
- Allegiance: United States of America
- Branch/service: Union Army
- Years of service: 1861–1865
- Rank: Captain
- Battles/wars: American Civil War

Solomon Lafayette Hoge (July 11, 1836 – February 23, 1909) was a lawyer, soldier, judge and politician in Ohio and South Carolina.

Hoge was born in Pickrelltown, Ohio, and he received his early childhood education at the public schools in the nearby city of Bellefontaine. Afterwards, he received a classical education at Geneva College in Northwood and he graduated from Cincinnati Law School in 1859. Hoge was admitted to the bar the same year and commenced the practice of law in Bellefontaine. Hoge believed that slavery should not only be prevented from spreading to new states and territories, but should be phased out in the states where it already existed. Hoge condemned President Franklin Pierce for Pierce's role in recognizing the pro-slavery government of Bleeding Kansas and he condemned the Supreme Court for their ruling in the case of Dred Scott v. Sandford as well President James Buchanan for supporting the ruling. Upon the outbreak of the Civil War in 1861, Hoge enrolled in the Union Army as a First Lieutenant in the 82nd Ohio Volunteer Infantry. He was promoted to captain and became the commander of a Federal company of infantry.

After the war, Hoge settled in Columbia, South Carolina, and despite possessing little legal experience was elected in 1868 as an associate justice to the South Carolina Supreme Court. He served eighteen months on the bench before moving on to the House of Representatives.

Hoge won a seat as a Republican to represent the 3rd congressional district after he successfully challenged the election of Democrat J.P. Reed to the Forty-first Congress. Since the Republicans controlled Congress, the two Democrats elected from South Carolina were unseated and Hoge filled the seat on April 8, 1869 and served the remainder of the term until March 3, 1871. Running on the Republican ticket with Franklin J. Moses, Jr. for governor in 1872, Hoge won the race for comptroller general against the Independent Republican candidate J. Scott Murray of Anderson. In 1874, Hoge waged another run for Congress to represent the 3rd district and he defeated Samuel McGowan, a Conservative Party candidate, to win the seat.

In 1870, Hoge appointed James Webster Smith, a former slave, to the United States Military Academy marking the first time an African-American had been admitted. Six years later, in 1876 Hoge appointed Johnson Chesnut Whittaker, another African-American, to the United States Military Academy.

Upon the completion of Hoge's term in 1877, South Carolina Republicans were in a state of disarray following Wade Hampton's victory in the 1876 gubernatorial election. Most white carpetbaggers left the state and Hoge was no different. He moved to Kenton, Ohio and practiced law there until 1882 when he became president of the First National Bank of Kenton. Hoge died in Battle Creek, Michigan, and was interred at Grove Cemetery in Kenton.

U.S. House of Representatives
Preceded by Manuel S. Corley	Member of the U.S. House of Representatives from South Carolina's 3rd congressional district 1869–1871	Succeeded by Robert B. Elliott
Preceded by Lewis C. Carpenter	Member of the U.S. House of Representatives from South Carolina's 3rd congressional district 1875–1877	Succeeded by D. Wyatt Aiken
