= Christopher Bowen (disambiguation) =

Christopher Bowen (born 1959) is a British actor.

Christopher Bowen may also refer to:

- Christopher C. Bowen (1832–1880), American politician from South Carolina
- Chris Bowen (born 1973), Australian politician

== See also ==
- Bowen (surname)
