= 1868 South Carolina gubernatorial election =

- June 2–3, 1868
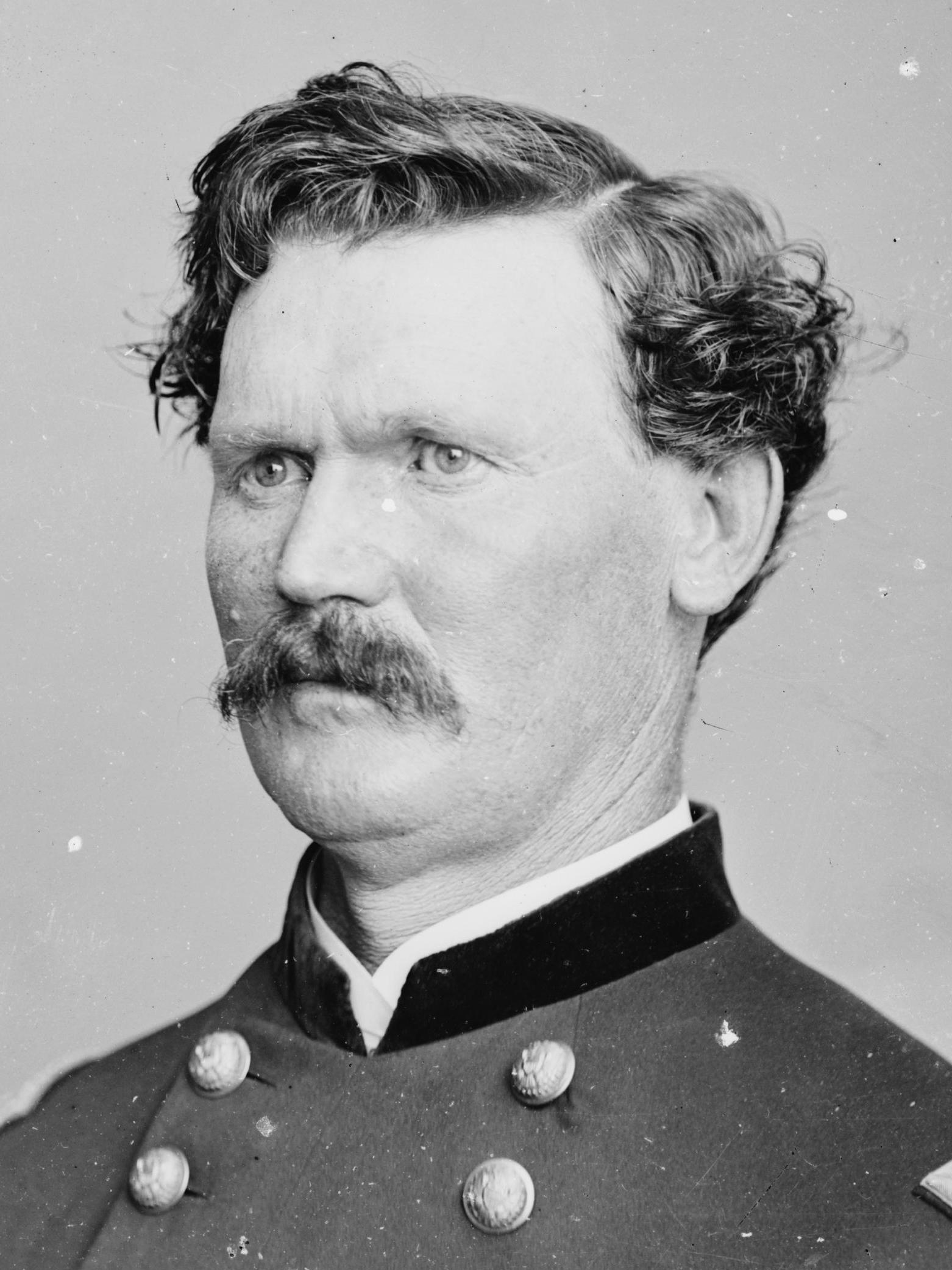

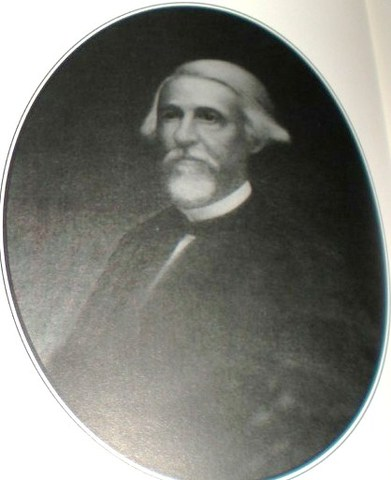
Nominee	Robert Kingston Scott	William Dennison Porter
Party	Republican	Democratic
Popular vote	70,054	23,096
Percentage	75.21%	24.79%
- County results Scott: 50–60% 60–70% 70–80% 80–90% >90% Porter: 50–60% 60–70%
Governor before election
James Lawrence Orr
Independent
Elected Governor
Robert Kingston Scott
Republican

The 1868 South Carolina gubernatorial election was held for two days from June 2 to June 3, 1868, to elect the governor of South Carolina; elections for statewide offices were held following the ratification of the South Carolina Constitution of 1868 on April 16. Republican Robert Kingston Scott won the election largely with the support of the newly enfranchised black vote and became the state's 74th governor.

== Campaign ==
The Republican Party was formed in South Carolina in 1867 to contest the elections of 1868. Members were chiefly composed of former slaves, and much of their support was derived from the Union League. They nominated Robert Kingston Scott, an Ohioan and assistant commissioner of the Freedmen's Bureau, as their candidate for governor. The platform of the state Republican Party for the election was to enact Radical Republican reconstruction of the state.

The Democratic Party, which had not been active in state politics since the Civil War, reorganized themselves for the election. They nominated William D. Porter for governor, although he declined the nomination; he remained on the ballot nonetheless. The state Democratic Party's platform for the election called for maintaining a policy of white supremacy and disapproval of South Carolina's newly ratified constitution.

== General election ==
Robert Kingston Scott, who received an overwhelming amount of support from South Carolina's newly enfranchised black voters, defeated William D. Porter in a landslide to become the state's first Republican governor.

1868 South Carolina gubernatorial election
Party	Candidate	Votes	%
Republican	Robert Kingston Scott	70,054	75.21
Democratic	William Dennison Porter	23,096	24.79
Total votes		93,150	100.0
Republican gain from Independent			

== See also ==
- Governor of South Carolina
- List of governors of South Carolina
- South Carolina gubernatorial elections

== Sources ==
- Reynolds, John S. (1969). Reconstruction in South Carolina. Negro University Press. pp. 86–97. ISBN 0-8371-1638-4.
- "The Election Farce". The Charleston Daily Courier. November 10, 1870. p. 2.

Preceded by 1865	South Carolina gubernatorial elections	Succeeded by 1870
