= Governor Moses =

Governor Moses may refer to:

- Franklin J. Moses Jr. (1838–1906), 75th Governor of South Carolina
- John Moses (North Dakota politician) (1885–1945), 22nd Governor of North Dakota
