= 1870 South Carolina gubernatorial election =

- October 19, 1870
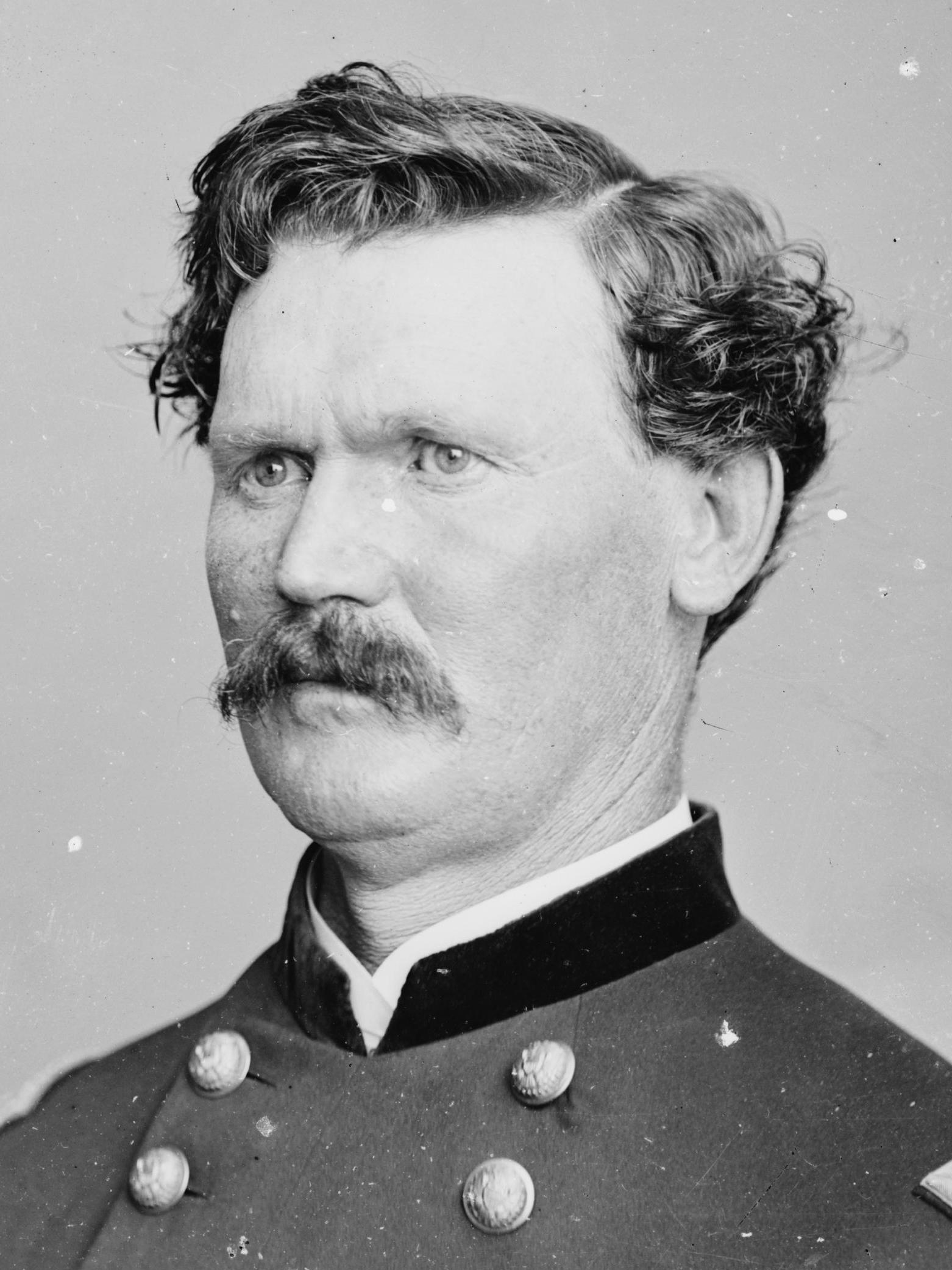

Nominee	Robert Kingston Scott	Richard B. Carpenter
Party	Republican	Union Reform
Alliance	-	Democratic
Popular vote	85,071	51,537
Percentage	62.27%	37.72%
- County results Scott: 50–60% 60–70% 70–80% 80–90% Carpenter: 50–60% 60–70%
Governor before election
Robert Kingston Scott
Republican
Elected Governor
Robert Kingston Scott
Republican

The 1870 South Carolina gubernatorial election was held on October 19, 1870, to select the governor of the state of South Carolina. Governor Robert Kingston Scott easily won reelection based entirely on the strength of the black vote in the state. The election was significant because white conservatives of the state would justify later actions with assertions that their loss demonstrated the impossibility of political harmony between the white and black race, and that only through violent insurrection and the use of terror would they be able to seize control of the state government.

== Union Reform Convention ==
The Radical Republican reforms and alleged corrupt schemes initiated by Governor Scott after he assumed office in 1868 infuriated the white population of the state. However, the Democratic Party of the state was so thoroughly defeated in the previous gubernatorial election that white conservatives realized the only way to seriously contest the election of 1870 was through the formation of a new political party. They organized a conference in Columbia on March 16 to formulate policies for the upcoming campaign. From the results of the previous election, white conservatives concluded that running a white supremacist campaign in a state where African-Americans were in the majority was futile and ineffective. The conference adopted two policies that would recognize African-American equality and ensure their protection under the law. The other resolution adopted was a campaign to wage against alleged radicalism in favor of a perception for a good and honest government.

Union Reform nomination for Governor
Candidate	Votes	%
Richard B. Carpenter	77.5	95.0
George S. Bryan	4	5.0

A nominating convention was held in Columbia on June 15 to select nominees for the state offices of Governor and Lieutenant Governor. In addition, a committee was formed at the convention to finalize the platform that the party would run on in the fall campaign. The chairman of the committee, Matthew Butler, submitted a paper with positions that would enforce the Fifteenth Amendment, uphold the existing laws enacted by the Radical Republicans, and to restore their perception of honesty and accountability in the state government. Furthermore, it was recommended that the new political party be called the Union Reform Party of South Carolina. Richard B. Carpenter, called a carpetbagger judge by some was from Charleston and considered of questionable reputation, won the nomination for Governor although he had never sought the position.

== Republican Convention ==
The state Republicans renominated Governor Scott unanimously for a second two-year term at their state convention in Columbia on July 26 and July 27. Policies adopted on their platform included the continuation of support for civil rights and to request Congress to sell public lands in the South to the landless.

== Campaign ==
Republican support was primarily from recently freed slaves. Reports vary as to alleged black militias drilling into the streets with bayonets fixed, threatening anyone who cast a vote against the Republicans. In addition, leaders of the Union League were influential to many African-American Republicans. As a result, violence erupted within the local communities. Additionally, former Governor Orr advocated for white voters to support the Republican ticket because only through the Republican party would reform be achieved and many of their policies were favorable to the white people.

Even though most African-Americans faced grave threats if they opted to support the Union Reform ticket, many sincerely refused to even consider a candidate other than a Republican. One African-American told white conservatives that "before the war you wouldn't let me join your party and now I don't choose to." It was virtually impossible for whites to convince African-American voters to vote for their candidates because Republican leaders repeatedly pointed out that whites only recognized black suffrage at the point of a bayonet.

Not only did the Union Reform party have a difficult task at attracting African-American voters, it also faced a disillusioned white electorate. The more extreme base of white voters simply were not willing to vote for any political party that allowed for African-Americans to participate as equals to the whites. Wade Hampton returned from his affairs in Mississippi to rally support for the Union Reform cause, but he encountered lukewarm support at best. It was estimated that less than half of the white voters in the state bothered to cast a ballot in the election.

== Election results ==
The general election was held on October 10, 1870, and Robert Kingston Scott was reelected as governor of South Carolina. Turnout for the election was high as Radical Republicans sought to discourage any future attempts of an organized opposition by show of force at the polls. The devastating defeat suffered by the Union Reform Party led to its demise and it never again functioned as a political party. Moreover, white men who had participated in the Union Reform effort felt they had disrespected their honor associating with African-Americans as their political equal.

South Carolina Gubernatorial Election, 1870
Party	Candidate	Votes	%	±%
Republican	Robert Kingston Scott (incumbent)	85,071	62.3	−12.8
Union Reform	Richard B. Carpenter	51,537	37.7	+37.7
No party	Write-Ins	14	0.0	0.0
Majority		33,534	24.6	−25.6
Turnout		136,622		
Republican hold				

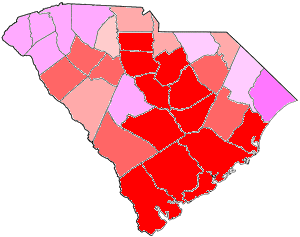
1870 South Carolina gubernatorial election map, by percentile by county. 65+% won by Scott 60%-64% won by Scott 55%-59% won by Scott 50%-54% won by Scott 50%-54% won by Carpenter 55%-59% won by Carpenter 60%-64% won by Carpenter

== See also ==
- Governor of South Carolina
- List of governors of South Carolina
- South Carolina gubernatorial elections

Preceded by 1868	South Carolina gubernatorial elections	Succeeded by 1872
