= Robert B. Elliott =

American politician

Robert Brown Elliott
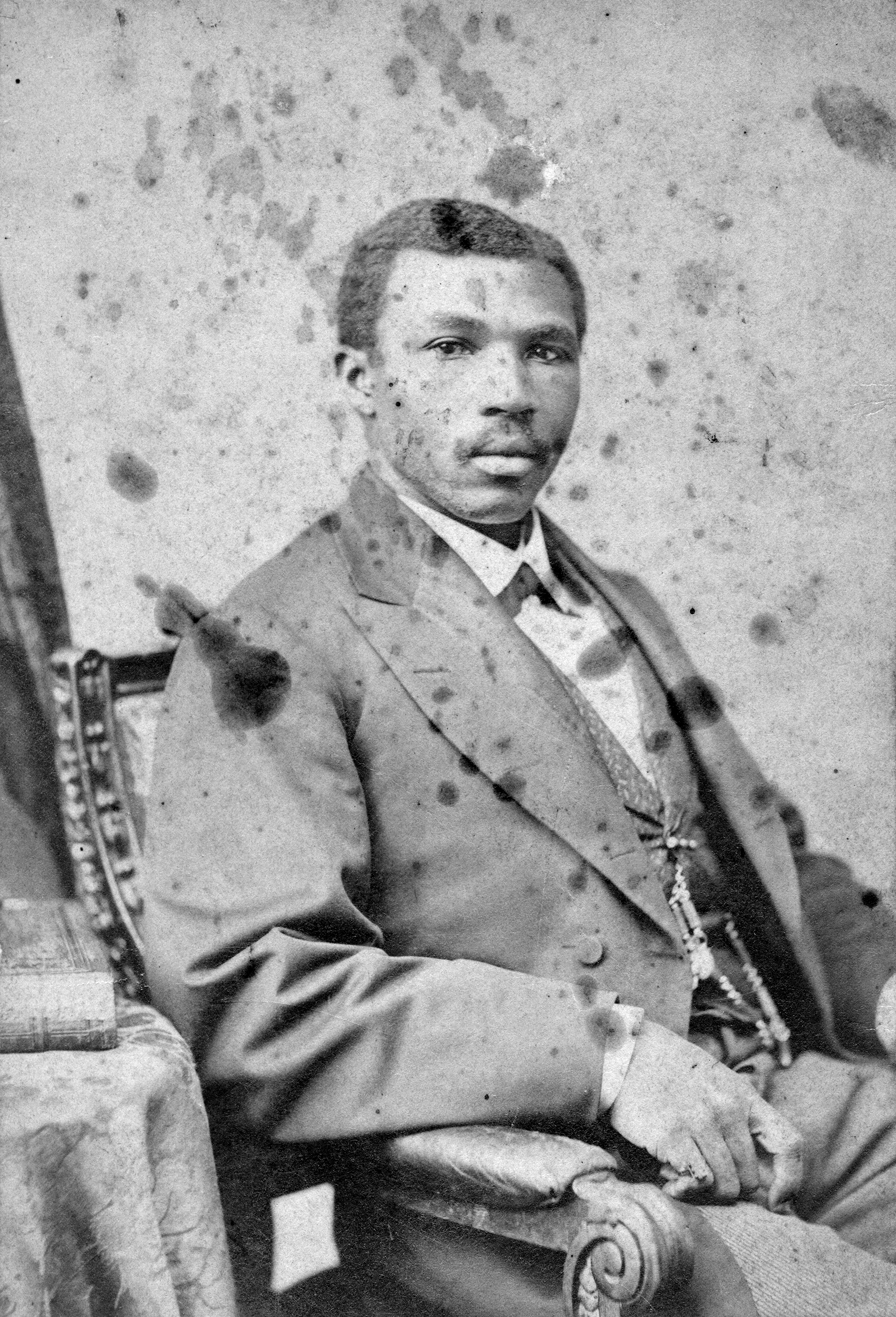
- Elliott c. 1871–1874

Member of the U.S. House of Representatives from South Carolina's 3rd district
- In office March 4, 1871 – November 1, 1874
- Preceded by: Solomon L. Hoge
- Succeeded by: Lewis C. Carpenter

29th South Carolina Attorney General
- In office December 14, 1876 – May 29, 1877
- Governor: Contested between Daniel Henry Chamberlain and Wade Hampton III
- Preceded by: William Stone
- Succeeded by: James Conner

28th Speaker of the South Carolina House of Representatives
- In office November 24, 1874 – April 14, 1876
- Governor: Franklin I. Moses, Jr. Daniel Henry Chamberlain
- Preceded by: Samuel J. Lee
- Succeeded by: Contested between William Henry Wallace and Edmund William McGregor Mackey

Member of the South Carolina House of Representatives from the Aiken County district
- In office November 24, 1874 – April 14, 1876

Member of the South Carolina House of Representatives from the Barnwell County district
- In office November 24, 1868 – March 1, 1870

Personal details
- Born: August 11, 1842 Liverpool, England, U.K.
- Died: August 9, 1884 (aged 41) New Orleans, Louisiana, U.S.
- Resting place: St. Louis Cemetery No. 2
- Party: Republican
- Profession: Lawyer, civil servant

Military service
- Allegiance: United States of America
- Branch/service: South Carolina National Guard
- Years of service: 1869–1871
- Rank: Commanding General
- Battles/wars: Reconstruction

Robert Brown Elliott (August 11, 1842 – August 9, 1884) was a British-born American politician of British Afro-Caribbean ethnic background. He was a member of the United States House of Representatives from South Carolina, serving from 1871 to 1874.

== Early life and education ==
He was born in 1842 in Liverpool, England, to parents likely from the British West Indies. He attended High Holborn Academy in London, England and then studied law, graduating from Eton College in 1859. From there he joined the British Royal Navy. Elliott arrived in Boston in 1867, and by late that year he was living in Charleston, South Carolina. He was admitted to the South Carolina bar in 1868 and began practicing law in Columbia, the state capital.

== Career ==
Elliott arrived in South Carolina in 1867 at the age of 25, where he established a law practice. Elliott helped organize the local Republican Party and served in the state constitutional convention in 1868 as a delegate from the Edgefield district. In the late 1860s he was hired by AME bishop and fellow future congressman Richard H. Cain to be an associate editor of the paper, the South Carolina Leader (renamed the Missionary Record in 1868), along with another future congressman, Alonzo J. Ransier. Around the same time, Elliott formed the nation's first known African-American law firm, Whipper, Elliott, and Allen, with William Whipper and Macon B. Allen.

In 1868, he was elected to the South Carolina House of Representatives. The next year he was appointed assistant adjutant-general; he was the first African-American commanding general of the South Carolina National Guard. As part of his job, he helped form a state militia to fight the Ku Klux Klan.

Elliott was elected as a Republican to the Forty-second United States Congress, defeating Democrat John E. Bacon. He was re-elected to the Forty-third United States Congress, defeating Democrat William H. McCann. In Congress in April 1871 he gave a notable speech on the "Bill to Enforce the Provisions of the Fourteenth Amendment to the Constitution", also known as the "Ku Klux Bill". He again "delivered a celebrated speech" in favor of the Civil Rights Act of 1875. He resigned on November 1, 1874, to serve as sheriff and fight political corruption in South Carolina. He served again in the South Carolina House of Representatives, where he was elected as Speaker of the House.

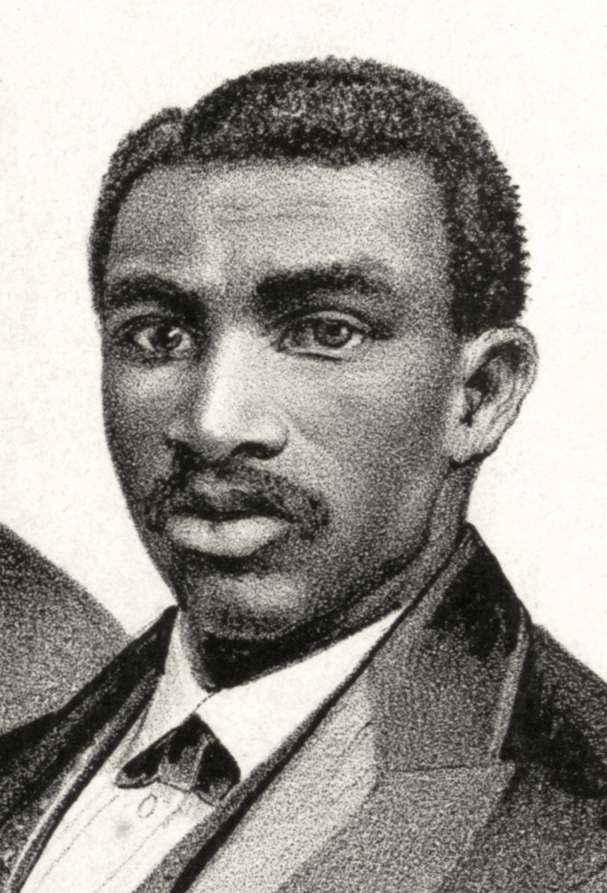
United States Congressman Robert Brown Elliott of South Carolina in 1872

He ran successfully for South Carolina Attorney General in 1876. In the state elections that year, white Democrats regained dominance of the state legislature. The following year, 1877, when the last of the federal troops were withdrawn from South Carolina, he was forced out of office. In 1878 he formed a law partnership with D. Augustus Straker and T. McCants Stewart.

He continued to be involved in politics, working on then-Treasury Secretary John Sherman's campaign for President in 1880, and was a delegate to the 1880 Republican National Convention. In January 1881 he was part of a black delegation that met with President James Garfield to protest the lack of civil and political rights in the South. However, his law practice faltered. In 1879, he was appointed a customs inspector for the Treasury Department in Charleston, South Carolina. He contracted malaria while working in that capacity on a trip to Florida. In 1881, he was transferred to New Orleans, and in 1882 he was dismissed. In New Orleans he again attempted to practice law, but found few clients. Impoverished, he died in New Orleans on August 9, 1884.

== Legacy ==
In 1998, the South Carolina House of Representatives unveiled a portrait of Elliott, painted by South Carolina artist Larry Francis Lebby. The portrait now hangs in the gallery of the House chambers.

== See also ==
- List of African-American United States representatives

U.S. House of Representatives
Preceded by Solomon L. Hoge	Member of the U.S. House of Representatives from South Carolina's 3rd congressional district 1871–1874	Succeeded by Lewis C. Carpenter
