= Union Reform Party of South Carolina =

The Union Reform Party of South Carolina was a political party of South Carolina during Reconstruction. Originally called the Citizen's Party, it was founded by reform-minded Republicans in the spring of 1870 to oppose the reelection of Governor Robert Kingston Scott. At the time, the electorate of South Carolina was predominantly composed of recently freed slaves who were unwilling to cast a vote for the Democratic Party. The white conservatives of the state recognized that the Democratic Party was a hopeless vehicle for power and instead sought to unite with the bolting Republicans. Not only would the alliance weaken the position of Scott's government, but the conservatives would then be in a position to influence a new government if elected.

The reform Republicans and white conservatives convened on June 15, 1870, in Columbia to form a new party in order to oppose the policies of the Radical Republicans. A large number of blacks also attended the convention because they had been promised two dollars a day. The Union Reform Party nominated Vermont Republican Richard B. Carpenter for Governor and Matthew Butler for Lieutenant Governor to contest the elections of 1870 by prearranged agreement. There initially were plans to nominate a black man for Lieutenant Governor, but both black men approached for the position declined and the blacks themselves nominated Butler. For the legislative races, a black man was placed on the ticket in every district.

On October 10, 1870, Governor Scott was reelected decisively over Carpenter, 62% - 38%. The Republicans swept all of the contests for Congress and maintained a large majority in the General Assembly. The Union Reform Party failed to gain many black votes because most blacks saw little difference between it and the Democratic Party. The general sentiment among blacks was that although the Republican party was corrupt, the Union Reform Party would limit and curtail their civil rights. After the election, the party became the opposition and its members split between the Democratic Party and the Independent Republican Party for the election of 1872. Richard B. Carpenter himself was taken back into the Republican party and elected in 1872 by the General Assembly for the judgeship of the Fifth Circuit.

== See also ==
- 1870 South Carolina gubernatorial election
