= Richard Howell Gleaves =

American politician (1819–1907)

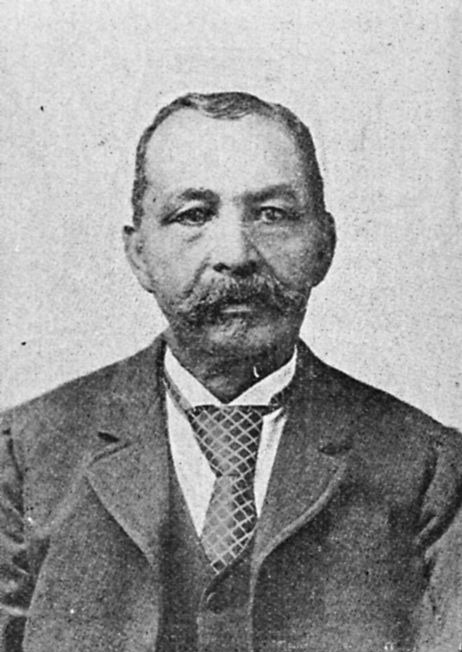

55th Lieutenant Governor of South Carolina
- In office December 7, 1872 – December 14, 1876
- Governor: Franklin J. Moses, Jr.; Daniel Henry Chamberlain
- Preceded by: Alonzo J. Ransier
- Succeeded by: William Dunlap Simpson

Personal details
- Born: July 4, 1819 Philadelphia, Pennsylvania, U.S.
- Died: November 1907 (aged 88) Washington, D.C., U.S.
- Party: Republican

Richard Howell Gleaves (July 4, 1819 – November 1907) was a lawyer, merchant, and politician who served as the 55th lieutenant governor of South Carolina from December 7, 1872 to December 14, 1876. He served under Governors Franklin J. Moses, Jr. and Daniel Henry Chamberlain. A Haitian-American of mixed ancestry, Gleaves was one of the highest elected black Americans during the Reconstruction era.

== Early life ==
Richard Howell Gleaves was born free in Philadelphia to a Haitian father, who had immigrated earlier in the century following the Haitian Revolution, and an English mother. He was educated in Philadelphia as well as in New Orleans, where a relatively large free black community existed.

== Career ==
He worked as a steward on Mississippi River steamboats before moving to Ohio and Pennsylvania. While back in the north, Gleaves was an active in the Prince Hall Freemasons, which had primarily African-American membership. He worked to organize Prince Hall lodges across the northern states.

In 1866 following the American Civil War, Gleaves moved to Beaufort, South Carolina. There he went into business with Robert Smalls, a former slave who during the war had captained a ship that he took from the Confederates. Gleaves purchased property in the town. His land included the site of a black fraternal hall now known as the Sons of Beaufort Lodge, located at 607 West Street. Gleaves, like his business partner Robert Smalls, went into politics and helped establish the Union League and the South Carolina Republican Party. He presided over that party's convention in 1867. From 1870–1872, he held multiple elected positions, including trial justice, probate judge and commissioner of elections.

In 1872 and 1874, Gleaves was elected as the 55th Lieutenant Governor of South Carolina. In 1874, he defeated Martin Delany, an African American running as an Independent Republican, for the office. In 1876, Gleaves was a delegate to the 1876 Republican National Convention which chose Ohio Governor Rutherford B. Hayes as its nominee. In the general election, there was massive fraud in South Carolina. Republican Party officeholders, including Gleaves, were defeated. The end of the Reconstruction Era and the removal of federal troops from South Carolina following the 1876 election signified the restoration of essentially one-party rule in the South, and Gleaves was the last Republican Lieutenant Governor of South Carolina until Bob Peeler was elected in the 1994 election.

Democratic Governor Wade Hampton appointed Gleaves to the position of trial justice in Beaufort but he declined and moved out of state. He had been indicted for fraudulent issuance of legislative pay certificates. After the 1880 presidential election, he returned to South Carolina when President James A. Garfield appointed him to the lucrative position of special customs inspector. This position lasted until 1882. He spent the end of his life working as a waiter at the Jefferson Club in Washington, D.C.

Gleaves was a prominent Freemason, the sixth National Grand Master of the Prince Hall National Grand Lodge of North America. Gleaves is said to have 3 sons. One of which is Benjamin F. Gleaves. The founder of the First Black Methodist Church in Maxton, NC

== See also ==
- List of minority governors and lieutenant governors in the United States

Masonic offices
Preceded by Paul Drayton	Grand Master of National Grand Lodge; 1865–1877	Succeeded by George W. LeVere
Political offices
Preceded by Alonzo J. Ransier	Lieutenant Governor of South Carolina; 1872–1876	Succeeded by William Dunlap Simpson
