= Esther Fahey =

American painter

Esther Edmonds Fahey (1887–1976) was an American painter.

Fahey was born Esther Edmonds in New York City, the daughter of painter Abraham Edmonds, who was among her teachers; she also had lessons at the Art Students League of New York and the École des Beaux-Arts in Paris, and was a graduate of the Cooper Union. Her family moved to South Carolina, where with her father she opened a studio in Columbia in 1910. The following year Abraham was offered a commission from the United States House of Representatives to produce a portrait of James Lawrence Orr, onetime Speaker of that body, to hang in the United States Capitol. He died prior to its completion, and Esther took it up in his stead. The completed work is now part of the United States Capitol collection. At its accession, coming as it did at the same time as a portrait of John Griffin Carlisle by Ellen Day Hale, the number of works in the Capitol art collection by women artists was doubled. In 1917 Edmonds married William Fahey, and in 1920 moved to Washington, D.C. after living for a time in New Orleans. She remained in Washington for much of the rest of her life, dividing time in her later years between the homes of her two daughters in Potomac, Maryland, and Stockton, California, before dying in the latter town in 1976.

There is some confusion in the literature over elements of Fahey's biography; notably, she was active at the same time as another artist, Esther Topp Edmonds of Pittsburgh. As a result, the middle name "Topp" has been given to her by some writers, but this is almost certainly erroneous. Some sources further confuse the issue by ascribing the work of one of the two artists to the other. Her maiden name is also given as Edmunds by some writers.
