= Manuel S. Corley =

American politician (1823–1902)

Manuel Simeon Corley

Member of the U.S. House of Representatives from South Carolina's 3rd district
- In office July 25, 1868 – March 3, 1869
- Preceded by: Laurence M. Keitt (1860)
- Succeeded by: Solomon L. Hoge

Personal details
- Born: February 10, 1823 Lexington County, South Carolina, US
- Died: November 20, 1902 (aged 79) Lexington, South Carolina, US
- Party: Republican
- Profession: Politician, editor

Military service
- Allegiance: Confederate States of America
- Branch/service: Confederate States Army
- Years of service: 1863–1865
- Battles/wars: American Civil War

Manuel Simeon Corley (February 10, 1823 – November 20, 1902) was a U.S. representative from South Carolina.

== Biography ==
"Sim" Corley was born in Lexington County, South Carolina, and spent four years as a student at Lexington Academy. He engaged in business in 1838.

Corley came out against talk of secession when it began being heard in South Carolina in the early 1850s, and an effort was made to expel him from the state. Corley was a leader in the state's Lutheran church and served as editor of the South Carolina Temperance Standard in 1855 and 1856.

Corley later claimed he had been the only editor in South Carolina to condemn as "disgraceful" South Carolina Sen. Preston Brooks assault on Massachusetts Sen. Charles Sumner on the senate floor in 1856. Corley entered the Confederate States Army in 1863 and was captured by Union troops at Petersburg, Virginia, on April 2, 1865. He took the oath of allegiance on June 5, 1865.

Corley served as delegate to the South Carolina Constitutional Convention of 1868. Running as a Republican, he was elected to the Fortieth Congress, serving from July 25, 1868, to March 3, 1869. He served as special agent of the United States Treasury in 1869, commissioner of agricultural statistics of South Carolina in 1870 and treasurer of Lexington County in 1874. He died in Lexington, South Carolina, on November 20, 1902.

== Sources ==
- United States Congress. "Manuel S. Corley (id: C000778)". Biographical Directory of the United States Congress.

U.S. House of Representatives
Preceded by Laurence M. Keitt (1860)	Member of the U.S. House of Representatives from South Carolina's 3rd congressional district 1868–1869	Succeeded by Solomon L. Hoge
