= Richard F. Simpson =

American politician

Richard Franklin Simpson

Member of the U.S. House of Representatives from South Carolina's 2nd district
- In office March 4, 1843 – March 3, 1849
- Preceded by: Robert Rhett
- Succeeded by: James L. Orr

Member of the South Carolina Senate from Laurens District
- In office November 24, 1834 – June 1, 1838

Personal details
- Born: March 24, 1798 Laurens, South Carolina
- Died: October 28, 1882 (aged 84) Pendleton, South Carolina
- Party: Democratic
- Education: South Carolina College
- Profession: Lawyer, politician, farmer

Military service
- Allegiance: United States of America
- Branch/service: South Carolina Regiment
- Years of service: 1835
- Rank: Major
- Battles/wars: Second Seminole War

Richard Franklin Simpson (March 24, 1798 – October 28, 1882) was a U.S. Representative from South Carolina.

Born in Laurens, South Carolina, Simpson graduated from South Carolina College (now the University of South Carolina) at Columbia in 1816. He studied law and was admitted to the bar in 1819. He began practice in Pendleton, South Carolina. He held several local offices. He served as major during the Second Seminole War in 1835. He volunteered with the Laurens County Company and was elected Captain of the Company. He was appointed Major of the South Carolina Regiment, and took his cavalry Battalion to Florida.

Simpson served as member of the State senate 1834-1838. He was elected as a Democrat to the Twenty-eighth, Twenty-ninth, and Thirtieth Congresses (March 4, 1843 – March 3, 1849). He declined to be a candidate for renomination in 1848. He served as member of the secession convention in 1860 and signed the ordinance of secession.

After his political involvement, Simpson engaged in agricultural pursuits. He died in Pendleton, South Carolina, October 28, 1882 and was interred in the family cemetery near that city.

== Sources ==
- United States Congress. "Richard F. Simpson (id: S000435)". Biographical Directory of the United States Congress.

U.S. House of Representatives
Preceded by Robert Rhett	Member of the U.S. House of Representatives from South Carolina's 2nd congressional district 1843–1849	Succeeded by James L. Orr
