= Lewis C. Carpenter =

American politician

Lewis Cass Carpenter

Member of the U.S. House of Representatives from South Carolina's 3rd district
- In office November 3, 1874 – March 3, 1875
- Preceded by: Robert B. Elliott
- Succeeded by: Solomon L. Hoge

Personal details
- Born: February 20, 1836 Putnam, Connecticut
- Died: March 6, 1908 (aged 72) Denver, Colorado
- Resting place: Denver, Colorado
- Party: Republican
- Profession: teacher, journalist, civil servant

Lewis Cass Carpenter (February 20, 1836 – March 6, 1908) was a U.S. representative from South Carolina.

Born in Putnam, Connecticut, Carpenter attended public schools before moving to New Jersey, where he taught school. He was appointed State inspector of public schools in New Jersey in 1863. At an early age he began writing for the press, and was connected with some New York papers for several years. He went to Washington, D.C., in 1864 and was employed in the Treasury Department. He studied law at Columbian University (now George Washington University), and after graduating he was admitted to the bar. While in Washington he was also employed as a newspaper correspondent. He moved to Charleston, South Carolina, in 1867 and became editor of the Charleston Courier after which he assisted in establishing the Charleston Republican in 1868. He also was secretary to United States Senator William A. Buckingham, of Connecticut from 1868 to 1873.

Carpenter was elected as a Republican to the Forty-third Congress to fill the vacancy caused by the resignation of Robert B. Elliott and served from November 3, 1874, to March 4, 1875. He was an unsuccessful candidate for election to the Forty-fifth Congress.

He moved to Denver, Colorado, in 1878, and thence, in 1879, to Leadville, where he edited a newspaper. He was appointed supervisor of the census for Colorado in 1880. Later he was appointed United States post-office inspector in 1881, resigning that post in 1883. In Colorado he engaged in the insurance business 1883-1890 before resuming the practice of law.

He died in Denver, Colorado on March 6, 1908. He was interred in Fairmount Cemetery in Denver.

== Sources ==
- United States Congress. "Lewis C. Carpenter (id: C000170)". Biographical Directory of the United States Congress.

U.S. House of Representatives
Preceded by Robert B. Elliott	Member of the U.S. House of Representatives from South Carolina's 3rd congressional district 1874–1875	Succeeded by Solomon L. Hoge
