= Reuben Tomlinson =

American politician

Reuben H. Tomlinson was an American lawyer, Freedmen Bureau official, and politician in South Carolina during the Reconstruction era. He was from Philadelphia.

Tomlinson was appointed superintendent of education by the Freedmen Bureau in Charleston, South Carolina, in 1865. He expanded the number of schools and hired teachers. In October 1865, he toured Saxton School with Oliver Otis Howard and other Freedmen Bureau officials as well as various dignitaries. He served as superintendent of education until October 1868 and was succeeded by Horace Neide and later Edward L. Deane. The state of South Carolina has a collection of his correspondence from 1865 until 1867 from his tenure as superintendent.

He served in the Georgia House of Representatives in 1870. He was a candidate in the 1872 South Carolina gubernatorial election, running as an Independent Democrat. He also served as state auditor.

Tomlinson is also credited as a contributor in the introduction and table of contents of Slave Songs of the United States, published in 1867 and known as the first book-length collection of African-American spirituals.

== See also ==
- South Carolina Department of Education
