= William H. Mishaw =

American politician, barber (died 1870)

William H. Mishaw (died 1870) was a barber, trial justice, state senator-elect, and a rising politician in Reconstruction era South Carolina. His obituary in the Charleston Daily News described him as one of the most intelligent colored people in Charleston.

He was born in Charleston, South Carolina. On March 8, 1865 he enlisted for one year in the 24th Infantry Regiment of the United States Colored Troops at age 22.

He was a captain in the militia created to protect African Americans, Randolph's Riflemen, named for Benjamin F. Randolph.

He died on election night as he won election to the office of state senator.
