= Alonzo J. Ransier =

American politician (1834–1882)

Alonzo Jacob Ransier
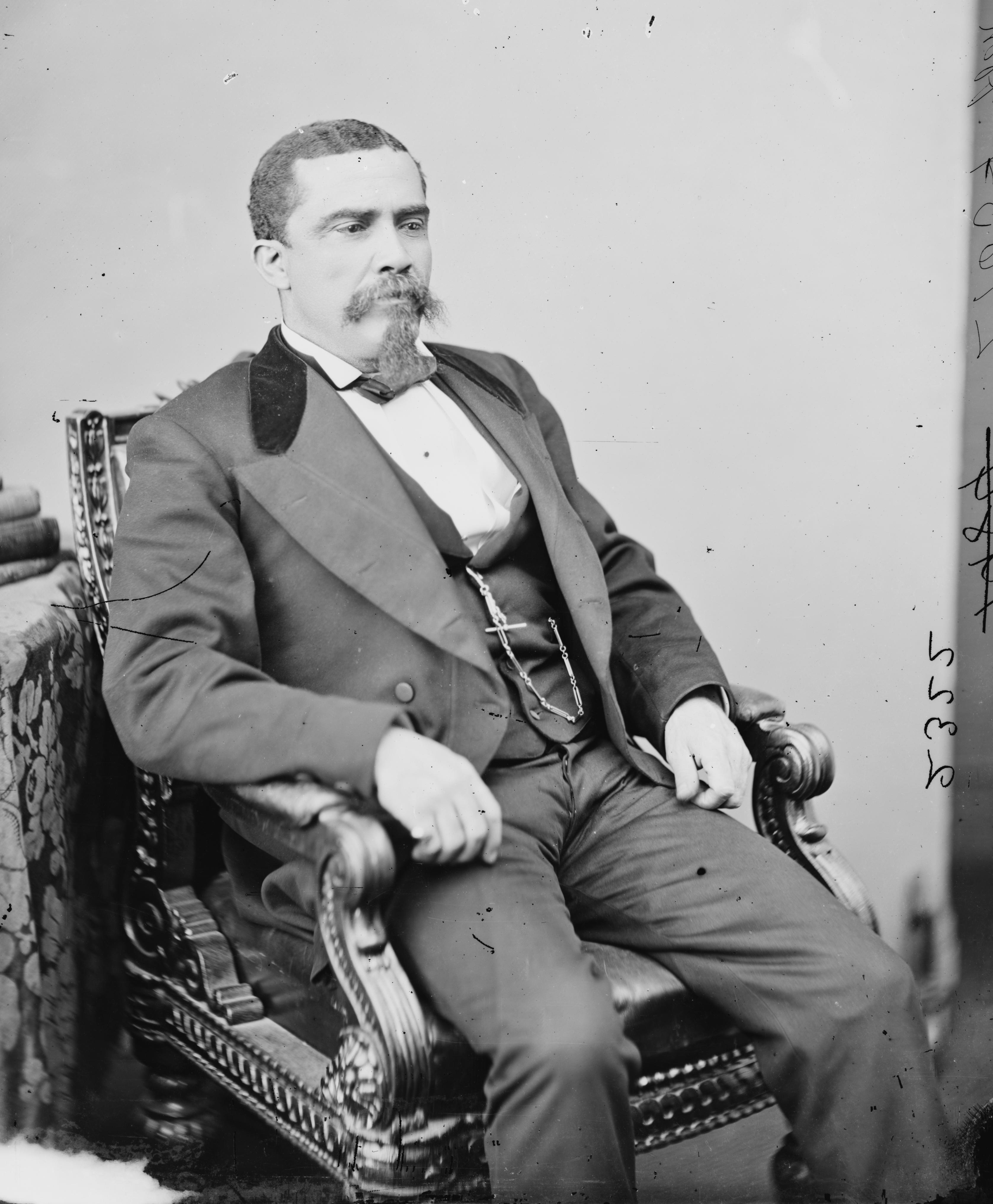

Member of the U.S. House of Representatives from South Carolina's 2nd district
- In office March 4, 1873 – March 3, 1875
- Preceded by: Robert C. De Large
- Succeeded by: Edmund W.M. Mackey

54th Lieutenant Governor of South Carolina
- In office December 3, 1871 – December 7, 1872
- Governor: Robert Kingston Scott
- Preceded by: Lemuel Boozer
- Succeeded by: Richard Howell Gleaves

Member of the South Carolina House of Representatives from Charleston County
- In office November 24, 1868 – March 1, 1870

Personal details
- Born: January 3, 1834 Charleston, South Carolina, U.S.
- Died: August 17, 1882 (aged 48) Charleston, South Carolina, U.S.
- Party: Republican
- Profession: Clerk, politician, tax collector

Alonzo Jacob Ransier (January 3, 1834 – August 17, 1882) was an American politician in South Carolina who served as the 54th (and first black) lieutenant governor of South Carolina and later was a United States Congressman from 1873 until 1875. He was a Reconstruction era Republican.

== Biography ==
Ransier was born a free person of color in Charleston, South Carolina, the son of freeborn Haitian immigrants. He worked as a shipping clerk until, after the Civil War, he was appointed as state registrar of elections in 1865.

In the late 1860s, he was hired by African Methodist Episcopal Church bishop and fellow future congressman, Richard H. Cain, to be an associate editor of the South Carolina Leader (renamed the Missionary Record in 1868), along with another future congressman, Robert B. Elliott.

Ransier was a member of the state constitutional convention in 1868. It authorized a public school system for the first time, as well as charitable institutions. At the convention, Ransier, along with fellow black delegates Robert B. Elliott and Francis Lewis Cardozo, was a leading proponent of compulsory school attendance, which the convention voted to enact. Later in 1868, he was elected to the South Carolina House of Representatives, serving to 1869.

He was elected from South Carolina's 2nd Congressional District to the 43rd United States Congress, where he fought for the Civil Rights Act of 1875. He also backed high tariffs and opposed a federal salary increase. He campaigned for President Ulysses S. Grant and advocated six-year presidential terms.

After leaving Congress in 1875, Ransier was appointed by Republicans as a collector for the Internal Revenue Service. At his death in 1882, he was working as a street cleaner in Charleston.

== See also ==
- List of African-American United States representatives
- List of minority governors and lieutenant governors in the United States

U.S. House of Representatives
Preceded by Robert C. De Large	Member of the U.S. House of Representatives from South Carolina's 2nd congressional district 1873-1875	Succeeded by Edmund W.M. Mackey
Political offices
Preceded by Lemuel Boozer	Lieutenant Governor of South Carolina; 1870–1872	Succeeded by Richard Howell Gleaves
