= Independent Republican Party of South Carolina =

American political party

The Independent Republican Party of South Carolina was a political party of South Carolina during Reconstruction. It was founded in 1872 to oppose the election of Franklin J. Moses Jr. for Governor of South Carolina after he had been nominated by the Republicans on August 21, 1872. Former governor James Lawrence Orr denounced the selection of Moses and led the formation of a new party.

== Election of 1872 ==
The Republicans in opposition to Moses met on August 22, 1872, at the Richland courthouse to select a ticket for the general election. The delegates warned that the future of the Republican party was at stake if reform was not initiated and corrupt politicians were elected to office. Reuben Tomlinson was nominated for governor, but the choice was largely uninspiring to the white populace.

The Independent Republican ticket was heavily defeated on October 16, 1872, with its candidate for governor losing 34%–65%. It was estimated that 40,000 whites did not vote, which would have been enough to tip the election in favor of the Independent Republicans.

== Election of 1874 ==
After the nomination of Daniel Henry Chamberlain for governor at the state Republican convention on September 8, 1874, a group of Republicans dissatisfied with the selection met on October 2 to choose their ticket for the general election. They chose John T. Green, a judge from Sumter, as their nominee for governor and for lieutenant governor, Martin R. Delany, a black doctor from Charleston. The Conservative Party of South Carolina expressed its support for the statewide candidates of the Independent Republicans on October 8.

On November 3, 1874, Chamberlain defeated Green by just over 11,000 votes in the closest election for governor since 1865. The Independent Republicans achieved some success on the Federal level with the election of Edmund W.M. Mackey in the Second District for Congress. Through the fusion with the Conservative Party in Charleston, they were also able to win some seats in the General Assembly.

== Election of 1876 ==
With the reestablishment of a strong Democratic Party, there was no organized opposition to Governor Chamberlain among the Republicans to form an Independent Republican slate of candidates. Those Republicans that did not support the Republican ticket instead gave their support to Wade Hampton.
