= Christopher C. Bowen =

American politician

Christopher Columbus Bowen
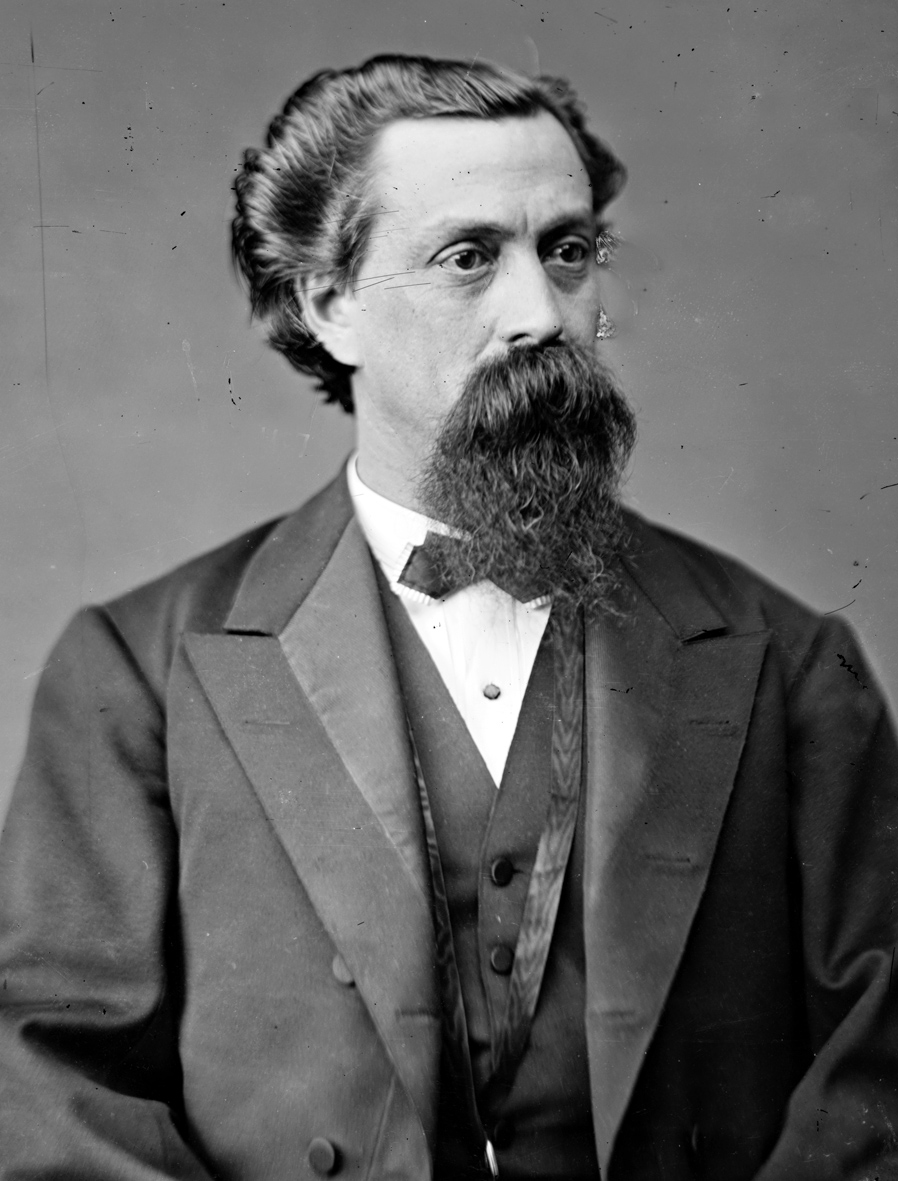

Member of the U.S. House of Representatives from South Carolina's 2nd district
- In office July 20, 1868 - March 3, 1871
- Preceded by: William P. Miles (1860)
- Succeeded by: Robert C. De Large

Member of the South Carolina House of Representatives from Charleston County
- In office December 2, 1871 – March 13, 1872

Personal details
- Born: January 5, 1832 Providence, Rhode Island
- Died: June 23, 1880 (aged 48) New York, New York
- Resting place: Charleston, South Carolina
- Party: Democratic
- Profession: Farmer, politician

Military service
- Allegiance: Confederate States of America
- Branch/service: Confederate States Army Coast Guard
- Years of service: 1862-1865
- Battles/wars: American Civil War

Christopher Columbus Bowen (January 5, 1832 – June 23, 1880) was a U.S. representative from South Carolina.

== Early life ==
Born in Providence, Rhode Island in 1832, Bowen attended the public schools. He moved to Georgia in 1850 as a young man, as good lands were available. There he engaged in agricultural pursuits and then studied law.

He was admitted to the bar in 1862 and commenced practice in Charleston, South Carolina. During the Civil War he enlisted in the Confederate States Army and served throughout the war as a captain in the Coast Guard. After the war, he resumed the practice of law in Charleston.

== Political career ==
Bowen served as a member of the Republican State convention at Charleston in May 1867. He then served as the first chairman of the South Carolina Democratic State central committee. He served as delegate to the State constitutional convention in November 1867.

Upon the readmission of South Carolina to the Union in 1868, he was elected as a Democrat to the Fortieth and Forty-first Congresses and served from July 20, 1868, to March 3, 1871.

He was an unsuccessful candidate for reelection in 1870 to the Forty-second Congress, being defeated by Robert De Large, a Republican He challenged the victory by De Large, but the Election Committee took a long time to rule in the case. He served as a member of The South Carolina House of Representatives from 1871 to 1872, and was elected sheriff of Charleston in November 1872.

The Election Committee declared that there were so many irregularities in the 1870 election that they could not declare a victor and demanded the congressional seat be made vacant in 1873.

Bowen died in New York City, June 23, 1880. He was interred in St. Laurence Cemetery, Charleston, South Carolina.

== Sources ==
- United States Congress. "Christopher C. Bowen (id: B000681)". Biographical Directory of the United States Congress.

U.S. House of Representatives
Preceded by William P. Miles (1860)	Member of the U.S. House of Representatives from South Carolina's 2nd congressional district 1868-1871	Succeeded by Robert C. De Large
