= Daniel Henry Chamberlain =

American politician (1835–1907)

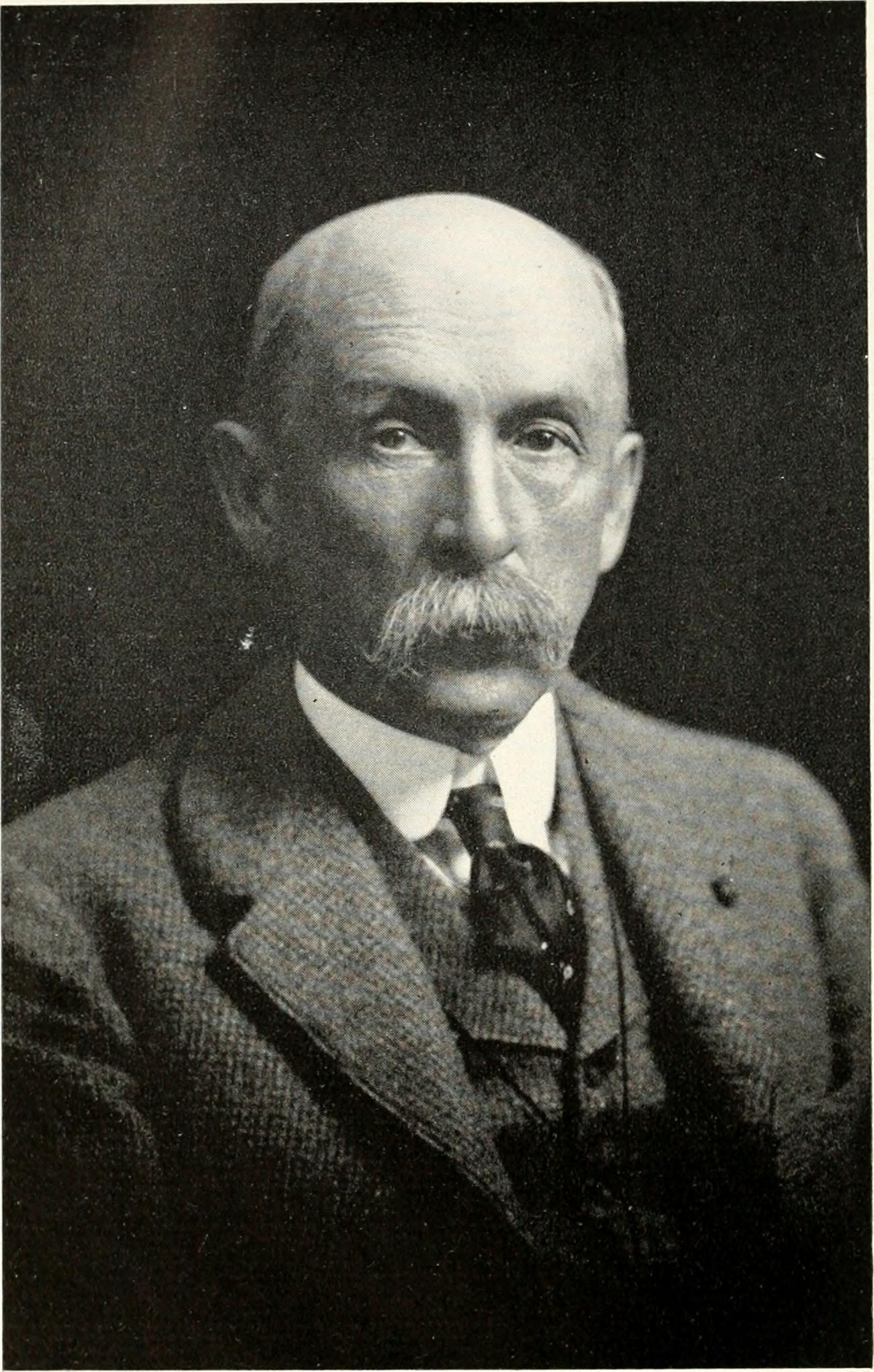
- Chamberlain c. 1898

76th Governor of South Carolina
- In office December 1, 1874 – April 11, 1877 Disputed with Wade Hampton III from December 14, 1876 (Note: The exact end of Chamberlain's term is disputed. After the Compromise of 1877 and the removal of federal troops from the South, Democrats began disenfranchising African Americans. Chamberlain claimed that the 1876 South Carolina gubernatorial election results were invalid because of this enfranchisement, refusing to leave office. Two governments were formed during this time and from December 14, 1876 until April 11, 1877, Chamberlain and Hampton both claimed to be Governor.)
- Lieutenant: Richard Howell Gleaves
- Preceded by: Franklin J. Moses, Jr.
- Succeeded by: Wade Hampton III

Attorney General of South Carolina
- In office July 6, 1868 – December 7, 1872
- Governor: Robert K. Scott
- Preceded by: I. W. Hayne
- Succeeded by: Samuel W. Melton

Personal details
- Born: June 23, 1835 West Brookfield, Massachusetts, U.S.
- Died: April 13, 1907 (aged 71) Charlottesville, Virginia, U.S.
- Resting place: Pine Grove Cemetery in West Brookfield, Massachusetts
- Party: Republican
- Education: Yale University; Harvard University

Military service
- Allegiance: United States
- Branch/service: United States Army
- Years of service: 1863–1865
- Rank: Second lieutenant
- Unit: 5th Massachusetts Cavalry Regiment
- Battles/wars: American Civil War; Second Battle of Petersburg; Capture of Richmond

Daniel Henry Chamberlain (June 23, 1835 – April 13, 1907) was an American planter, lawyer, and author who was the 76th governor of South Carolina from 1874 until 1876 or 1877. The federal government withdrew troops from the state and ended Reconstruction that year. Chamberlain was the last Republican governor of South Carolina until James B. Edwards was elected in 1974.

== Early life and education ==
Chamberlain was born in West Brookfield in Worcester County in central Massachusetts, the ninth of ten children born to Eli Chamberlain and Achsah Forbes. In 1862, he graduated with honors from Yale University, where he was a member of the Skull and Bones society. He attended Harvard Law School, though he left two years early to join the Union Army.

== Civil War ==
Chamberlain left Harvard in 1863 to serve as a second lieutenant in the United States Army with the 5th Massachusetts Cavalry, a regiment of black volunteer troops. They trained from January to May 1864 at Camp Meigs outside of Boston. Chamberlain's only taste of combat came at Baylor's Farm during the Second Battle of Petersburg from June 14–15, 1864. From late June 1864 to March 1865 Chamberlain and the regiment were stationed at Point Lookout, Maryland, serving as guards for a prisoner of war camp housing 20,000 Confederate soldiers. The 5th left Maryland and returned to Virginia, where they were allegedly one of the first regiments to enter the city of Richmond after its capture. Chamberlain and the regiment were then sent to Clarksville, Texas until the end of the war. He returned to Boston in October 1865 and officially left the army.

== Career ==
=== South Carolina politics ===
In 1866, Chamberlain moved to South Carolina to tend to the affairs of a deceased classmate. He first entered politics as a delegate to the 1868 South Carolina Constitutional Convention from Berkeley County. Chamberlain served as state attorney general from 1868–1872 in the administration of Governor Robert K. Scott. After he failed to win the Republican nomination for governor in 1872, Chamberlain practiced law in Charleston. His partner later recalled that he worked hard for little compensation; whatever his ethics in office, he certainly had not amassed a fortune. In 1873, he was elected to the board of trustees of the University of South Carolina as the first black students were admitted and faculty hired for the institution.

Chamberlain was elected Republican governor on November 3, 1874, when he defeated John T. Green. Chamberlain received 80,403 votes (53.9%) to Green's 68,818 votes (46.1%). Chamberlain's reputation had been a dubious one; there certainly was evidence of a willingness to make his office pay, and possibly of corruption, in his earlier career. But by the time he became governor, he had become the representative of those Republicans convinced of the need for reform—a conviction strengthened by the notorious administration of his predecessor, Franklin J. Moses, Jr., and the national publicity given to The Prostrate State, the exposure of South Carolina political conditions written by James Shepherd Pike.

Chamberlain delivered on his promises. While continuing his support of civil rights, he made war on government expenses and the high tax levels in the state. He tried to reduce all public officers' wages by a third and used his veto against tax rates that he considered too high. He urged that spending be cut for the lunatic asylum and that many of its inmates be shipped off to county poorhouses. Instead of paying so much for the penitentiary, he endorsed revival of the convict-lease system. He believed that there should only be half as much money for the agricultural college, and an end to any state scholarship program. As for the state university, Chamberlain called for dismissing its faculty and replacing them with school teachers. "We only want a good high school", as he put it. His struggles over patronage pitted him against some of the leading African-American Republicans in the legislature and gave him a national reputation. It also made him deep enemies in the party.

Enjoying a close alliance with the Democratic editor of the Charleston News and Courier, Chamberlain may have hoped for bipartisan support in his bid for re-election. It did not come. South Carolinian Democrats chose to adopt a white-supremacy program, re-enforced with intimidation and the use of force against black Republican voters. The bitterly fought 1876 campaign was disrupted with mob violence and gunmen breaking up Republican campaign meetings. After Chamberlain informed President Ulysses S. Grant of the violent situation, Grant sent troops in October 1876 under General of the Army William T. Sherman to stop the violent mob action. On election night, his second term hinged on disputed votes from Laurens and Edgefield counties, where the counts greatly exceeded the total population. These overwhelmingly favored his opponent, ex-Confederate Wade Hampton, III.

Through the winter, Chamberlain and Hampton both claimed to lead the lawful government, but Chamberlain's found it nearly impossible to raise the money or military force to function beyond the rooms in which it met. Chamberlain left South Carolina in April 1877 when President Rutherford B. Hayes withdrew Federal troops to barracks from their place protecting the Republican government and ended the interventions that had taken place intermittently in the state since the Civil War. Embittered, Chamberlain blamed the President for having betrayed the mass of South Carolina's voters; the population was 58% African American. In later years, however, he grew disillusioned with Reconstruction and contended that letting black people vote had been a mistake.

== Later life and education ==
Chamberlain moved to New York City and became a successful Wall Street attorney. He was a professor of constitutional law at Cornell University from 1883 until 1897. Chamberlain authored the 1902 book Charles Sumner and the Treaty of Washington, as well as numerous articles.

Upon his retirement, he traveled extensively in Europe. He moved to Charlottesville, Virginia, where he died of cancer on April 13, 1907. He is interred at Pine Grove Cemetery in West Brookfield, Massachusetts.

Chamberlain was the last Republican to fill a high office in South Carolina until 1964, when U.S. Senator Strom Thurmond defected from the Democratic to the Republican parties.

== See also ==
- Massachusetts in the American Civil War
- 5th Massachusetts Cavalry Regiment
- Yale University
- Harvard Law School
- Skull and Bones

Party political offices
| Preceded by Franklin J. Moses Jr. | Republican nominee for Governor of South Carolina; 1874, 1876 | Vacant Title next held by Joseph Augustis Tolbert |
Legal offices
| Preceded by Isaac W. Hayne | Attorney General of South Carolina; 1868–1872 | Succeeded by Samuel Wickliff Melton |
Political offices
| Preceded by Franklin J. Moses, Jr. | Governor of South Carolina; 1874–1876 | Succeeded by Wade Hampton, III |
