= Robert C. De Large =

American politician

Robert C. DeLarge
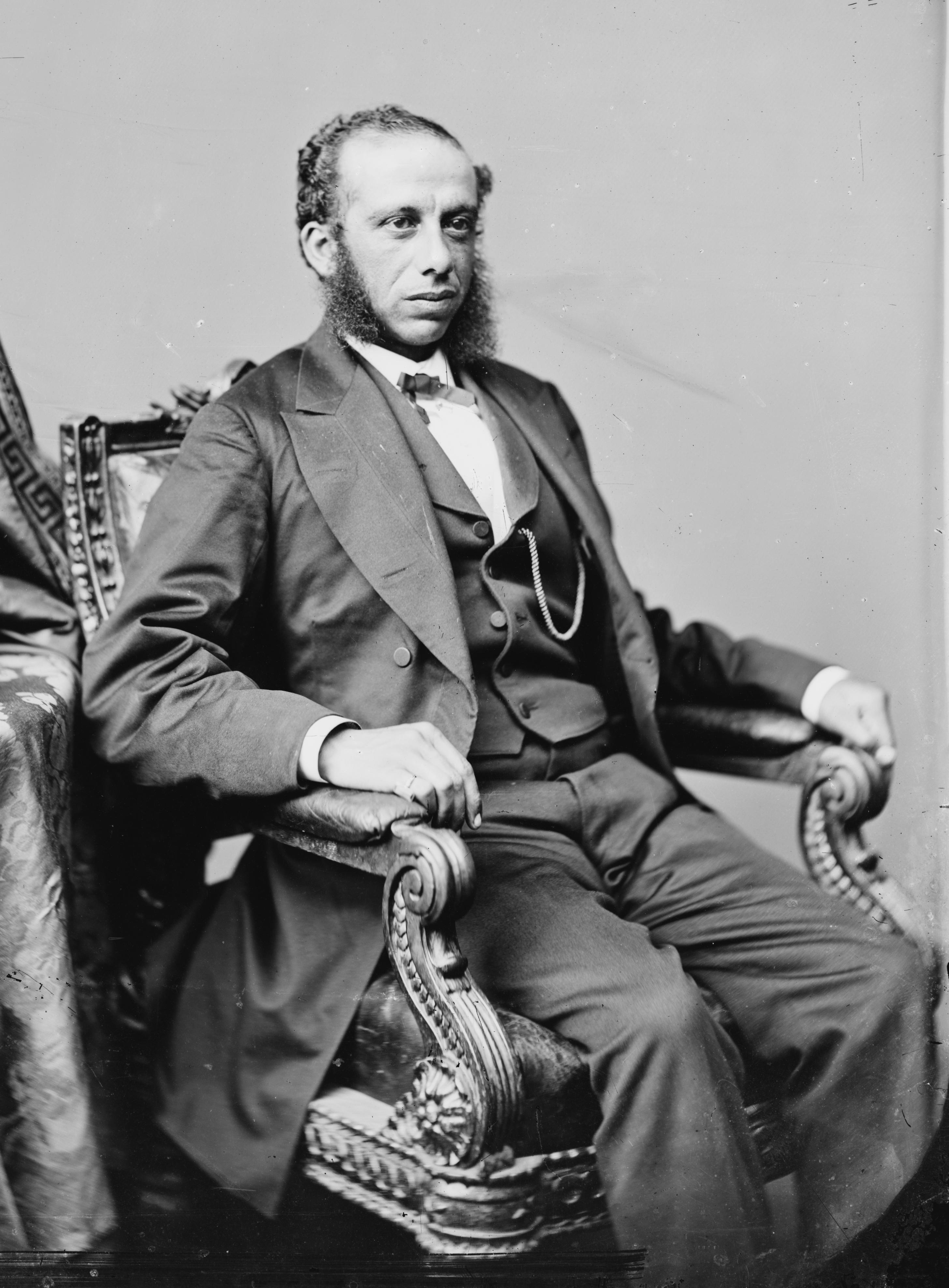

Member of the U.S. House of Representatives from South Carolina's 2nd district
- In office March 4, 1871 – January 24, 1873
- Preceded by: Christopher C. Bowen
- Succeeded by: Alonzo J. Ransier

Member of the South Carolina House of Representatives from Charleston County
- In office November 24, 1868 – March 1, 1870

Personal details
- Born: March 15, 1842 Aiken, South Carolina, US
- Died: February 14, 1874 (aged 31) Charleston, South Carolina, US
- Party: Republican
- Profession: Farmer, politician

Robert Carlos De Large (March 15, 1842 – February 14, 1874) was a Republican member of the United States House of Representatives from South Carolina, serving 1871 to 1873. He was earlier a delegate to the 1868 state constitutional convention and elected in 1868 to the South Carolina House of Representatives for one term.

== Early life and education ==
De Large was born in Aiken, South Carolina, on March 15, 1842, the mixed-race son of an African American mother and mixed-race father, according to scholar Benjamin Ginsberg. Timothy P. McCarthy suggests both parents were mulatto or mixed race. They were slaveholders and part of the mulatto elite of Charleston, South Carolina. De Large's parents' names are not known, but his father was a tailor and his mother a seamstress. His parents encouraged his education, sending him to North Carolina for primary school; he returned to Charleston and graduated from Wood High School. De Large became a tailor and farmer. As a young man, De Large became a member of the Brown Fellowship Society of Charleston, made up of people of color who had been free before the Civil War. They were among the elite African Americans in the city who were skilled artisans and led the people of color.

During the Civil War, De Large was employed by the Confederate Navy. He saved considerable sums and established a stake for after the war. At that time, he became involved in politics, and was elected as a delegate to the South Carolina constitutional convention in 1868. That year he was also elected as a Republican member of the South Carolina House of Representatives, serving one term until 1870 when he was elected State land commissioner. He was also one of the commissioners of the State's sinking fund. De Large was elected to the U.S. House of Representatives later that year.

He served in the U.S. House of Representatives from March 4, 1871, until January 24, 1873. At that time, Congress declared the seat vacant as the result of an election challenge by his Democratic opponent Christopher C. Bowen. The Election Committee of the House found there so many 'abuses and irregularities' on both sides during the election that determining a victor was impossible. In addition, it found that De Large had maintained two positions in South Carolina government that were incompatible with his role as a congressman. On January 18, 1873, the committee declared the seat vacant for the rest of the 42nd Congress, set to adjourn in March, and gained agreement by the full House.

After leaving Congress, De Large served as a local magistrate until his death from tuberculosis in Charleston on February 14, 1874, at the age of 31.

He is buried in the Brown Fellowship Graveyard.

== See also ==
- List of African-American United States representatives

U.S. House of Representatives
Preceded by Christopher C. Bowen	Member of the U.S. House of Representatives from South Carolina's 2nd congressional district 1871-1873	Succeeded by Alonzo J. Ransier
