= Franklin J. Moses Jr. =

American lawyer, editor, and politician (1838–1906)

Franklin Moses
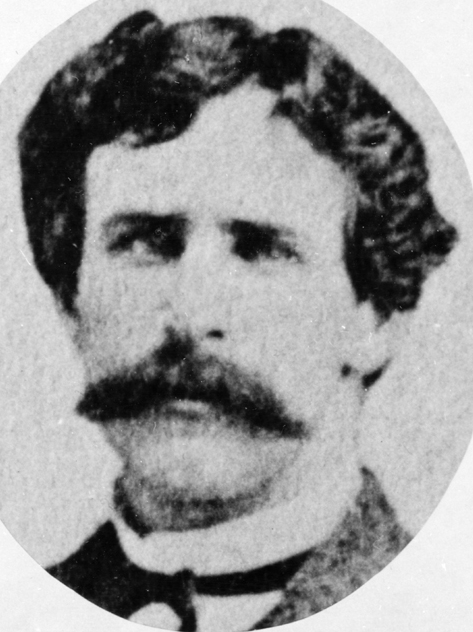

75th Governor of South Carolina
- In office December 7, 1872 – December 1, 1874
- Lieutenant: Richard Howell Gleaves
- Preceded by: Robert Kingston Scott
- Succeeded by: Daniel Henry Chamberlain

27th Speaker of the South Carolina House of Representatives
- In office November 24, 1868 – November 26, 1872
- Governor: Robert Kingston Scott
- Preceded by: Charles Henry Simonton
- Succeeded by: Samuel Lee

Adjutant-General of South Carolina
- In office July 6, 1868 – December 7, 1872
- Governor: Robert Kingston Scott
- Preceded by: Albert Garlington
- Succeeded by: Henry Purvis

Personal details
- Born: January 1, 1838 Sumter District, South Carolina, U.S.
- Died: December 11, 1906 (aged 67–68) Winthrop, Massachusetts, U.S.
- Party: Republican
- Spouse: Emma Buford Richardson (1869–1878)
- Children: 4
- Education: University of South Carolina

Franklin Israel Moses Jr. (January 1, 1838 – December 11, 1906) was a South Carolina lawyer and editor who became active as a Republican politician in the state during the Reconstruction Era. He was elected to the legislature in 1868 and served as Speaker of the South Carolina House of Representatives. He was governor in 1872, serving in 1874. Enemies labelled him the 'Robber Governor'.

A secessionist before the war, Moses was ready to make alliances afterward. He served in the state legislature from 1868 to 1872, where he was elected as speaker of the House. He supported integration of the state university, establishing new social programs and public funding of old-age pensions, and created a black militia to help protect freedmen from white paramilitary insurgents. He was also unusual for hosting African Americans socially, both as a governor and as a private citizen.

When Moses was young, his middle initial was confused for the letter J, and thereafter he became known simply as Franklin J. Moses Jr.; his father also adopted use of the "J." His father, Franklin J. Moses Sr., was an attorney who served as a South Carolina state senator for more than 20 years; in 1866 he was elected as judge to the circuit court, and in 1868 as Chief Justice of the State Supreme Court.

== Early life and career ==
Moses was born in 1838 in Sumter District, South Carolina, to attorney Franklin J. Moses Sr. and Jane McLellan. His father was born and reared in a prominent Jewish family of Charleston of Portuguese and German descent; and his Scots-Irish mother was a Methodist. Moses was raised as an Episcopalian and was never affiliated with Judaism. Nonetheless, he was widely regarded as Jewish because Southerners placed so much emphasis on paternal heritage; his political enemies tried to promote this perception against him. He enrolled at South Carolina College (now the University of South Carolina) in 1855, but was honorably dismissed from the freshman class the same year.

After reading the law, Moses was admitted to the bar in South Carolina. In 1860 he was appointed as the private secretary of Governor Francis Wilkinson Pickens, a supporter of secession. At the outbreak of the Civil War, Moses was commissioned as Colonel in the Confederate Army; he served as an enrolling officer for the Confederate Conscription Acts. Moses claimed to have personally lowered the United States flag from over Fort Sumter in 1861.

== Political career ==
In 1868, during Reconstruction, Moses was elected to the statewide office of Adjutant and Inspector General on the Republican ticket. In addition, he was elected to the South Carolina House of Representatives from Charleston and advanced to the speaker of that body. His father was elected as Chief Justice of the State Supreme Court the same year.

While speaker of the House, Moses organized a statewide militia. This 14,000-man body was composed mostly of freedmen and headed by white officers. He used them to protect black voters during a period of intimidation and violence by the Ku Klux Klan and other white insurgents leading up to the 1870 elections, and was not above trying to disrupt Democratic Party meetings and voters. In this period, as noted by historian Benjamin Ginsberg, 'election outcomes depended as much upon the balance of armed force as upon the distribution of political popularity.'

After the legislature appointed Moses as a trustee for the University of South Carolina in 1869, he expressed his goal to integrate the state university. There was concerted white opposition. Also appointed as trustees that year were Republicans Francis L. Cardozo, who was of mixed race, born free before the war, and who had earned college and seminary degrees from Scotland; and Benjamin A. Boseman. They were the first men of color appointed to the University Board of Trustees. Moses encouraged admission of black students, and the college established a preparatory school and 5-year, pre-freshman program to help blacks make up for having been closed out of formal education.

In 1873 Henry E. Hayne, the Republican secretary of state, was the first black student admitted to the college; he studied medicine. This notable event was covered by national media; The New York Times described the mixed-race Hayne, who was born free before the war, "as white as any of his ancestors" (Hayne was known to be a descendant of a white South Carolina statesman and likely had other white ancestors.) Some of the faculty objected so much to the fact of his admission that they resigned. Moses arranged for new hires.

After Democrats regained control of the state legislature in 1876, the General Assembly closed the college. In 1877 the legislature passed a law restricting admission to whites and ending the preparatory programs. It authorized the college to re-open in 1880 as a whites-only Morrill Act land grant college. The legislature authorized Claflin College in Orangeburg to serve as the state's land grant college for students of color. No black students were admitted again to the state's flagship university until 1963, years after the US Supreme Court had ruled in 1954 in Brown v. Board of Education that segregation of public schools was unconstitutional.

Moses supported social programs and the idea of publicly funded old-age pensions. He organized a state militia, which was staffed mostly by blacks and men of color, that helped protect freedmen in years of growing white insurgency to revive white supremacy.

Moses was reelected in 1870 to the House and continued to serve as the speaker. White Democrats accused the legislature of rampant corruption and bribery, but it was also spending on infrastructure, such as railroads, and public welfare institutions, which the pre-war planter-dominated legislature had not. The state debt in 1868 stood at $5,407,306, and by 1872 it had risen to $18,350,000, a tripling of the debt in four years. As Marxist historian W.E.B. Du Bois noted in his history, Black Reconstruction (1930), one reason that debt increased in numerous Southern states was that Reconstruction legislatures were "investing" for public purposes; the planter elite had avoided such actions before the war; all education was private, there were few hospitals or other institutions, and the South was behind in investing in railroad construction to improve regional transportation. Du Bois acknowledged there was corruption after the war, but asserted that it was generally within limits of comparable periods and tumultuous social conditions of the postwar societies.

When Moses was nominated by the Republicans as the candidate for governor, opponents within the party organized to block his election. But with overwhelming black Republican support, Moses was elected in 1872 as the 75th governor of South Carolina. He then "proceeded to give the State the most corrupt administration of the reconstruction."

His biographer Ginsberg noted that Moses created new alliances with African-American men during this period; they each had been somewhat on the margins before. Serving with Moses were Francis Cardozo, secretary of state, and Robert De Large, elected as state land commissioner and later as US Representative. Both men were mixed-race sons of enslaved mothers (who were themselves mixed race) and Jewish fathers.

As Governor, Moses became known for extravagant spending of state money. He spent $40,000 to buy the Preston mansion to use as the official governor's residence. During his two years as governor, with a salary of $3,500, he spent $40,000 on living expenses, which included official entertaining. What really rankled many white Democrats was that he officially entertained black colleagues and politicians at the mansion.

In 1874, Governor Moses was indicted by allies of Wade Hampton III for misappropriation of state funds. Democrat Hampton would run for governor in 1876 and finally win the election, amidst evidence of vote fraud by Democrats and preceded by numerous violent attacks against freedmen by paramilitary white groups supporting his candidacy. Moses ordered four companies of the militia in Columbia to prevent his arrest by the Democrats. The court ruled that Moses could not be prosecuted while governor and could be charged only through impeachment by the state legislature. (His father had served since 1868 as Chief Justice of the State Supreme Court.) This ruling is generally in keeping with recognition of executive authority.

Historian Benjamin Ginsberg's 21st-century biography notes that Moses should be known also for his substantial achievements in civil rights goals for African Americans. He considers Moses to be a forerunner of what became an African-American and Jewish alliance in the 20th century. He believes that as Moses had been on the margin of planter society, he chose to ally with the newly enfranchised freedmen in trying to create a new society.

== Later life ==
Upon leaving office in 1874, Moses was chosen by the General Assembly to a seat on the circuit court, but Republican Governor Chamberlain blocked his appointment. It was opposed by many within the party because of his reputation for corruption while governor.

In 1876, the Democrats regained control of state politics in the legislature and Wade Hampton III was elected governor. He won by less than a 1,200-vote margin statewide, despite widespread fraud. For example, heavily contested Edgefield and Laurens counties each counted more votes for Hampton than the total number of registered voters. With the withdrawal of federal troops from the state and other parts of the South in 1877, in a compromise supporting Hampton, the Reconstruction era was over.

Moses' wife Emma Buford Richardson filed for divorce in 1878, and Moses left the state shortly thereafter. He had a troubled later life. According to a statement he made in court in 1902, he had become addicted to morphine (then available over the counter) and opium while serving in the Reconstruction South. On September 17, 1878, he was arrested in New York City for forging a note of $316. He was delivered to authorities in South Carolina, who admitted to just allowing him to escape, literally opening his cell door and the outside door of the prison and telling him "We're going to look the other way." He was arrested again for fraud in New York City in 1881, and in Chicago in 1884.

Moses settled in Winthrop, Massachusetts, where he became the editor of the local newspaper and served as moderator of the town meetings. In October 1884, he was convicted of swindling $15 from a Rev. E. L. Rexford and sentenced to jail. During his imprisonment, he tried to hang himself in his cell. In 1885 he was sentenced to three years in the Massachusetts State Prison after being convicted several times for committing petty theft and fraud.

Believing Moses did not have long to live, as his drug addictions had ruined his health, Governor Oliver Ames pardoned the attorney in 1887. In 1902, Moses was arrested again, convicted for larceny of an overcoat worth $50, and sentenced by the Boston Municipal Court to four months imprisonment. He appealed to the court for mercy while acknowledging he was responsible, saying that he had become addicted to morphine and opium while serving in the Reconstruction South and was struggling to correct his life.

== Death by asphyxiation ==
Estranged from his family, Moses died by asphyxiation from a gas stove on December 11, 1906. The police initially did not determine if it was suicide or an accident. He was buried in Winthrop.

== Personal life ==
Like his father, Moses married a Gentile (non-Jewish) woman, Emma Buford Richardson (1841–1920), on December 20, 1869. They had four children together, Franklin J. III (b. 1860); Mary Richardson (b. September 12, 1862); Jeannie McLellan, named for his mother (b. Jan 20, 1867-d. February 7, 1938), Sumter, South Carolina; and Emma Buford Moses (b. November 21, 1872). From June 1, 1866 to September 26, 1867, Moses was editor of the Sumter News, a Conservative paper.

Party political offices
Preceded by Robert Kingston Scott	Republican nominee for Governor of South Carolina; 1872	Succeeded by Daniel Henry Chamberlain
Political offices
Preceded by Robert Kingston Scott	Governor of South Carolina; 1872–1874	Succeeded by Daniel Henry Chamberlain
