= List of assassinated American politicians =

Assassinations carried out against American politicians occurred as early as the 19th century, the earliest of which is believed to have been carried out against David Ramsay in 1815. Since then, several American politicians have been assassinated while being elected or appointed to office, or were candidates for public office. Out of these, four were president of the United States, the earliest of which being Abraham Lincoln in 1865 and the most recent being John F. Kennedy in 1963.

This list includes politicians who ran for or were appointed to political office, whose deaths are described as "assassination" in reliable sources. Deaths resulting from duels or private disputes are not included.

== Federal offices ==
=== Presidents of the United States ===
Politician	Portrait	Party	Year	Location	Assassin	Motive	Ref
Abraham Lincoln		Republican	April 14, 1865 (incident); April 15, 1865 (death)	Ford's Theatre, Washington, D.C.	John Wilkes Booth	Revenge for the defeat of the Confederate States of America	
Abraham Lincoln	Main article: Assassination of Abraham Lincoln Lincoln was attending a play at Ford's Theatre five days after the surrender of Confederate General Robert E. Lee in the American Civil War. Booth, a well-known actor and a Confederate sympathizer, was allowed into the president's box where he waited at the back until the audience laughed, hoping it would mask the sound of his gun. He shot Lincoln in the back of the head with a pistol. He then drew a knife and slashed at Major Henry Rathbone. Booth leapt from the box onto the stage where he broke his leg, shouted "sic semper tyrannis", and then fled to his horse. An unsuccessful attack on Secretary of State William H. Seward took place simultaneously. Lincoln was taken to a boarding house across the street where he died nine hours later. Booth was found by soldiers on April 26. Wielding a gun and refusing to surrender, Booth was shot and killed by Sergeant Boston Corbett. Eight co-conspirators were tried for Lincoln's assassination and found guilty by a military commission, four of whom were executed by hanging on July 7, 1865.						
James A. Garfield		Republican	July 2, 1881 (incident); September 19, 1881 (death)	Washington, D.C.	Charles J. Guiteau	Retribution for perceived failure to reward campaign support	
James A. Garfield	Main article: Assassination of James A. Garfield Garfield arrived at a railroad station on a visit to his ill wife Lucretia Garfield. Guiteau approached Garfield from behind and shot him two times with a pistol. Several doctors arrived to treat the wound, but their actions worsened and contaminated it. Garfield was brought to the White House to receive further treatment, remaining in critical condition and developing sepsis over the following weeks as doctors kept exacerbating the wound. He was brought to Elberon, New Jersey, in September to escape Washington's warm climate. He died from his wound days later. Guiteau was hanged on June 30, 1882.						
William McKinley		Republican	September 6, 1901 (incident); September 14, 1901 (death)	Pan-American Exposition in Buffalo, New York	Leon Czolgosz	To advance anarchism	
William McKinley	Main article: Assassination of William McKinley McKinley was shaking hands with visitors at the Pan-American Exposition when he was approached by Czolgosz. Czolgosz's hand was bandaged, under which he concealed a revolver. He shot McKinley twice before he was apprehended by guards and members of the crowd. McKinley was brought into surgery at the exposition's medical facility and partially recovered while staying at the home of John G. Milburn. His condition then declined and he developed gangrene. McKinley died eight days after he was shot. Czolgosz confessed to the killing and said that it was his "duty". He was executed by electric chair on October 29, 1901.						
John F. Kennedy		Democratic	November 22, 1963	Dallas, Texas	Lee Harvey Oswald	Unknown	
John F. Kennedy	Main article: Assassination of John F. Kennedy Kennedy was riding in a motorcade in Dallas, Texas, when Oswald set up a sniper's nest on the sixth floor of the Texas School Book Depository. Kennedy was in an open convertible, and Oswald fired at Kennedy three times with a rifle. The third shot struck Kennedy's skull, releasing brain matter from his head. He was taken to Parkland Memorial Hospital and was pronounced dead half an hour later. Oswald fled from the scene and killed Officer J. D. Tippit with a revolver when he was approached as a potential suspect. Police apprehended Oswald 1 hour and 40 minutes after the assassination. As Oswald was being escorted through the police department two days later, businessman Jack Ruby approached Oswald and shot him on live television. Oswald died two hours later. Kennedy's assassination was one of the most defining events of the 20th century in the United States, and numerous conspiracy theories and conflicting eyewitness accounts have presented alternate explanations of how and why Kennedy was killed.						

=== Members of the United States Congress ===
Politician	Portrait	Party	Date	Office	Location	Assassin	Motive	Ref
Robert Potter		Democratic	March 2, 1842	Former U.S. representative from North Carolina's 6th district	Harrison County, Republic of Texas	William Pinckney Rose and a group of Regulators	Potter's role as a Moderator	
Robert Potter	Main article: Regulator–Moderator War Potter participated in the Regulator–Moderator War as a leader of the Harrison County Moderators. Potter's home was surrounded by a group of Regulators led by William Pinckney Rose, causing him to flee and dive into a nearby lake. The Regulators shot and killed him after he jumped in.							
Josiah M. Anderson		Whig	November 8, 1861	Former U.S. representative from Tennessee's 3rd district	Bledsoe County, Tennessee	Unknown Unionists	Having made a secession speech	
Josiah M. Anderson	Delegate to the 1861 peace convention in Washington, D.C. Stabbed to death after giving a speech in favor of secession.							
Thomas C. Hindman		Democratic	27 September 1868 (incident); 28 September 1868 (death)	Former U.S. representative from Arkansas's 1st district	Helena, Arkansas	Unknown assailants	Disputed motive	
Thomas C. Hindman	Hindman was in his sitting room with his family when a man shot him with a musket through the open window. The Republican Party was accused of assassinating him, but its members suggested non-political motives for the killing.							
James M. Hinds		Republican	October 22, 1868	U.S. representative from Arkansas's 2nd district	Monroe County, Arkansas	George W. Clark	Hinds' support for Reconstruction policies	
James M. Hinds	Hinds was shot alongside Reverend James Brooks while they were campaigning for Ulysses S. Grant in the heavily-Democratic Monroe County. Clark caught up to the men on horseback shortly after giving them directions, shooting both men with a shotgun before fleeing. Brooks rode to town for help with minor injuries while Hinds laid mortally wounded. Hinds was taken to a doctor but died shortly after. Clark was not prosecuted for the killing.							
Thomas Haughey		Republican	July 31, 1869 (incident); August 5, 1869 (death)	Former U.S. representative from Alabama's 6th district	Courtland, Alabama	Collins (first name unknown)	Assassin supported Haughey's opponent	
Thomas Haughey	Haughey was campaigning for reelection at a courthouse. He got in an argument and then a fistfight with Collins, a supporter of his opponent, who then shot Haughey with a revolver. Haughey died five days later. Collins was broken out of jail and never found.							
José Francisco Chaves		Republican	November 26, 1904	Former Congressional delegate from the New Mexico Territory's at-large district	Pinos Wells, New Mexico	Unknown assailant	Unknown motive	
José Francisco Chaves	Chaves was dining at a friend's home when a man shot at him through a window.							
John M. Pinckney		Democratic	April 24, 1905	U.S. representative from Texas's 8th district	Hempstead, Texas	J. N. Brown	Pinckney's support for Prohibitionism	
John M. Pinckney	Pinckney was speaking during a Prohibition League event when a protestor, J. N. Brown, fired his pistol at the prohibitionists. A 30-second gunfight broke out between the groups. Pinckney died trying to stop the fight and his brother died trying to pull him back. Brown and Prohibition League leader John Mills were also killed. Brown's son was also shooting, and he was charged as an accomplice but acquitted.							
Huey Long		Democratic	September 9, 1935 (incident); September 10, 1935 (death)	U.S. senator from Louisiana; Former Governor of Louisiana	Baton Rouge, Louisiana	Carl Weiss	Disputed motive	
Huey Long	Main article: Assassination of Huey Long Long was an influential but polarizing figure in American politics, and previous assassination attempts caused him to hire bodyguards. While at the Louisiana State Capitol to give his thoughts on state legislation, Weiss approached him and shot him with a FN Model 1910. Bodyguards tackled Weiss and then returned fire, killing him. Long underwent surgery and died of internal bleeding early the next morning. Many details of the killing are unknown, so various theories and alternate sequences of events have been proposed, including some that say Weiss was not the killer.							
Robert F. Kennedy		Democratic	June 5, 1968 (incident); June 6, 1968 (death)	U.S. senator from New York; Presidential candidate; Former attorney general	Los Angeles, California	Sirhan Sirhan	Revenge for Kennedy's support for Israel during the Six-Day War	
Robert F. Kennedy	Main article: Assassination of Robert F. Kennedy Kennedy was staying at the Ambassador Hotel while campaigning for president. While cutting through the kitchen to reach his room after a speech, Sirhan Sirhan fired eight shots from a pistol, hitting Kennedy in the head. Kennedy was taken to Good Samaritan Hospital where he died 26 hours later. Congress passed a law granting Secret Service protection to major presidential contenders. Sirhan was sentenced to death, but this was commuted to life in prison after California abolished capital punishment.							
Leo Ryan		Democratic	November 18, 1978	U.S. representative from California's 11th district	Port Kaituma, Guyana	Members of the People's Temple	Ryan's investigation of Jonestown	
Leo Ryan	Ryan went to Guyana to investigate allegations of abuse in the Jonestown settlement of the Peoples Temple movement, and he examined the facility. He learned that several members wanted to leave and brought them to the airport as he left. Members of the Peoples Temple ambushed his delegation before he boarded, killing Ryan and four others. Peoples Temple leader Jim Jones had all of his followers commit mass suicide the same day. The ambush's leader Larry Layton was acquitted in Guyana but extradited and found guilty in the U.S.							
Allard K. Lowenstein		Democratic	March 14, 1980	Former U.S. representative from New York's 5th district	New York City, New York	Dennis Sweeney	Schizophrenia-induced belief that Lowenstein was the leader of an international Jewish conspiracy	
Allard K. Lowenstein	Sweeney was a student and political ally of Lowenstein. Believing that Lowenstein led a conspiracy targeting him, Sweeney entered Lowenstein's office and shot him with a pistol. Sweeney then waited in the office for the police to arrest him. He was found not guilty by reason of insanity.							

=== Federal judges ===
Politician	Portrait	Party	Date	Office	Location	Assassin	Motive	Ref
John H. Wood Jr.			May 29, 1979	Judge of the U.S. District Court, Western District of Texas	San Antonio, Texas	Charles Harrelson	Contract killing ordered by Jamiel Chagra as he was set to be tried by Wood	
John H. Wood Jr.	As a judge, Wood had a reputation for giving severe sentences in drug-related cases. Drug trafficker Jamiel Chagra was set to be tried by Wood, so he hired contract killer Charles Harrelson to kill the judge. On his way to the court, Wood was shot by Harrelson in the back with a rifle, killing him instantly. The Federal Bureau of Investigation launched a sprawling investigation, and it identified Harrelson as a suspect a few years later. Harrelson and other co-conspirators were indicted in 1982 and found guilty.							
Richard J. Daronco			May 21, 1988	Judge of the U.S. District Court, Southern District of New York	Pelham, New York	Charles Koster	Assailant was the father of a plaintiff whose harassment suit was dismissed by Daronco	
Richard J. Daronco	Daronco presided over a discrimination and sexual harassment case in 1988, in which Carolee Koster was suing Chase Bank and her boss Allan Ross after she was fired. Carolee and her father Charles dedicated years of their lives and most of their savings to the case. Charles had to be removed from the courtroom during the case because of his emotional investment in the case, and Daronco ruled against Carolee on May 19. Two days later, Daronco was gardening in his yard when Charles arrived and shot him. Daronco made it into his home before dying from his wounds. Charles followed him in and then shot himself. Carolee later said she regretted not settling out of court.							
Robert Smith Vance		Democratic	December 16, 1989	Judge of the U.S. Court of Appeals for the Eleventh Circuit	Mountain Brook, Alabama	Walter Moody	Killed after the court refused to expunge a previous conviction for explosives possession from the assailant's record	
Robert Smith Vance	Vance was targeted by Moody because he was a member of the Eleventh Circuit Court of Appeals. Moody had been convicted of possessing an explosive in 1972 and blamed the court for his failure to get the conviction overturned. Moody mailed a pipe bomb to Vance on December 14. Vance received it two days later and opened the package at his kitchen table. It exploded, killing him instantly and seriously injuring his wife. Moody was indicted after the FBI determined the bomb was identical to Moody's previous explosive, and he was sentenced to life in prison for the killing. Moody would be executed by lethal injection in 2018.							

== State offices ==
=== Governors ===
Politician	Portrait	Party	Date	Office	Location	Assassin	Motive	Ref
Charles Bent		Independent	January 19, 1847	Governor of the New Mexico Territory	Taos, New Mexico	Tomás Romero; Pablo Montoya	Part of the Taos Revolt; opposition to American presence in New Mexico	
Charles Bent	Bent was appointed governor of the New Mexico Territory, which was part of Mexico until it was occupied by the United States. Several Hispanic and Native American residents of Taos and the nearby settlement Taos Pueblo attacked Bent in his home. He refused to act in his own defense, believing the assailants to be his friends. They shot him with arrows in the face and stomach, slashed his hands and wrists, shot him with firearms after he tried to escape outside, and scalped him. This was followed by a series of attacks over the following weeks, the Taos Revolt. Some of the assailants were hanged for the killings. Bent was succeeded by Donaciano Vigil.							
William Goebel		Democratic	January 30, 1900 (incident); February 3, 1900 (death)	Governor of Kentucky	Frankfort, Kentucky	Unknown assailant	Unknown motive	
William Goebel	Goebel lost the 1899 Kentucky gubernatorial election but challenged it as fraudulent. He arrived at the Old State Capitol on January 30, 1900, to hear a committee's findings on election fraud. As Goebel approached the building, he was shot in the chest with a rifle. Goebel was brought back to his hotel. The committee determined that the election had been fraudulent and declared him the winner, which Democratic legislators voted to affirm on January 31. He was sworn in as governor on his deathbed the same night. Goebel died on February 3, and party leaders negotiated an agreement on February 6 in which Goebel was recognized as the winner and his running mate Lieutenant Governor J. C. W. Beckham succeeded him. The assassin was never identified.							
Frank Steunenberg		Democratic	December 30, 1905	Former Governor of Idaho	Caldwell, Idaho	Albert Horsley	Opposition to Steunenberg's labor policy	
Frank Steunenberg	Steunenberg was killed by a bomb planted on his front gate by miner Albert Horsley on December 30, 1905. Steunenberg had been elected governor of Idaho in 1896 but became unpopular with the mining union and chose not to run for reelection in 1900. The bomb exploded when Steunenberg opened the gate, and he died shortly after. Horsley was arrested, having already been involved with a previous bombing. He confessed and implicated three leaders of the Western Federation of Miners. They were arrested but not convicted of any charges.							

=== State legislators ===
Politician	Portrait	Party	Year	Office	Location	Assassin	Suspected motive	Ref
John A. Treulten		Non-partisan	1782	Member of the Georgia House of Representatives; former governor of Georgia	Savannah, Georgia (disputed)	Disputed	Disputed	
John A. Treulten	Some accounts allege Treulten's home was attacked by a group of men (possibly British) who set his home on fire after he refused to come outside. After fleeing his burning home with his family, Treulten was singled out and killed. Another theory is that Treulten was captured and killed by British forces in South Carolina amidst the ongoing American Revolutionary War.							
David Ramsay			May 6, 1815 (incident); May 8, 1815 (death)	Former president of the South Carolina Senate	Charleston, South Carolina	William Linnen	Assailant retaliated after Ramsay deemed him insane	
David Ramsay	Ramsay had been asked to evaluate Linnen's mental state and determined him insane, sending him to prison. Linnen was eventually released and made threats against Ramsay, who did not take them seriously. On May 6, 1815, Linnen walked past Ramsay holding a handkerchief. He then turned around, drew a pistol from beneath it, and shot Ramsay three times in the back. Ramsay was brought to his home where he insisted that Linnen was not in control of his actions and should not be considered guilty. He died two days later.							
James Strang		Democratic	June 16, 1856 (incident); July 9, 1856 (death)	Member of the Michigan House of Representatives	Beaver Island, Michigan	Hezekiah McCulloch, Thomas Bedford, and Alexander Wentworth	Opposition to Strang's religious leadership	
James Strang	Strang was the leader of his own sect of Mormonism, proclaiming himself its king. Three men who opposed Strang, each for their own reasons, formed a plot to kill him. They were led by McCulloch, a former friend of Strang's. They allied with Captain Charles H. McBlair of USS Michigan, who docked at Beaver Island and summoned Strang to board the ship. When Strang prepared to board, Bedford and Wentworth emerged from behind stacks of cordwood and shot Strang twice in the back of the head. After he fell to the ground, they shot him once in the back and struck him in the face with their guns. They fled to Mackinac County aboard USS Michigan with McCulloch and their respective families. Here their actions were celebrated. They were taken to jail, but the doors were left unlocked so they could leave and no further investigation occurred. Strang died from his wounds weeks later, and the Mormon community of Beaver Island was forcibly displaced.							
Thomas Johnson			January 2, 1865	Former member of the Kansas Territorial Legislature	Kansas City, Missouri	Disputed	Disputed	
Thomas Johnson	A group of men approached Johnson's home after midnight under the guise of asking for directions. The men tried to force their way into Johnson's home and in the process shot him in the abdomen, killing him. Johnson had attempted to bring slavery to Kansas, but at the start of the American Civil War had moved to Missouri and declared his support for the Union. Johnson's killing remains unsolved with pro-Union assassins, pro-secession assassins, or a simple botched robbery being proposed for the reason he was killed.							
Almon Case		Republican	January 11, 1867	Member of the Tennessee Senate	Obion County, Tennessee	Frank Farris	Attacks on Republicans	
Almon Case	Case was shot and killed outside his home by Farris due to Case's pro-Union stance. Case's son had been shot and killed a year earlier in an attempted assassination.							
Solomon Dill		Republican	June 4, 1868	Member of the South Carolina House of Representatives	Kershaw County, South Carolina	Unknown	Attacks on Republicans	
Solomon Dill	Dill was at home with his wife, Rebecca, and a freedman named Nestor Ellison who he had befriended. Assailants fired into the home, killing Dill and Ellison and wounding his wife.							
James Martin		Republican	October 5, 1868	Member of the South Carolina House of Representatives	Abbeville County, South Carolina	Ku Klux Klan (alleged)	Attacks on Republicans	
James Martin	Martin was returning home from the Abbeville Court House on a mule and a wagon full of whiskey and was accompanied by three black men. The group was overtaken by a group of armed men on horseback and they demanded that they surrender and hand over the whiskey in order to not be hurt. The group surrendered, but the men began to pursue Martin who began to run before he was shot and left to bleed out in a ditch. The men drank some whiskey before pouring the rest out and fleeing. Martin's pocket book was also stolen. It is believed he was killed due to his appeals to black voters.							
Benjamin F. Randolph		Republican	October 16, 1868	Member of the South Carolina Senate	Hodges, South Carolina	Ku Klux Klan (alleged)	Attacks on Republicans	
Benjamin F. Randolph	Randolph was a black senator who was killed after arriving at Hodges Station by train. The Ku Klux Klan was allegedly responsible for the assassination.							
Joseph Adkins		Republican	May 10, 1869	Member of the Georgia State Senate	Dearing, Georgia	Ellis Adams (Ku Klux Klan)	Attacks on Republicans	
Joseph Adkins	Adkins was a politician who supported civil rights for African Americans, becoming an enemy of the Klan shortly after they had murdered George Ashburn. Arrived at Dearing railroad depot on his return from Washington, D.C., where he had been leader of a delegation to counter Klan violence and request military support. Adkins was intercepted by a mob who stole his horse and buggy, shot and left him for dead. He was discovered by his wife and daughter, who attempted to transport him home; however, he died enroute. Adkins had previously reported Ellis Adams for various crimes.							
John W. Stephens		Republican	May 21, 1870	Member of the North Carolina Senate	Yanceyville, North Carolina	Caswell County chapter of the Ku Klux Klan	Attacks on Republicans	
John W. Stephens	Stephens sat in on a Conservative meeting where he was received with hostility over his support for Reconstruction. He was allowed to sit, but he was accused of being a spy for the Republicans. Former county sheriff Frank Wiley spoke to Stephens, and the two went into the courthouse's basement where he was ambushed and killed by the Ku Klux Klan. A search party was formed that evening when he did not return home, and his body was found by his brother the following morning. In response to Stephens' killing and other Ku Klux Klan activities, Governor William Woods Holden declared martial law to combat the group, triggering the Kirk–Holden war. John Lea, the leader of Caswell County's Ku Klux Klan chapter at the time, confessed to orchestrating Stephens' assassination in 1919.							
Richard Burke			August 1870	Member of the Alabama House of Representatives	Sumter County, Alabama	Ku Klux Klan	Attempting to organize meetings of African Americans	
Richard Burke	Burke was shot and killed near his home by Ku Klux Klan members for his work attempting to organize meetings among African Americans.							
Wade Perrin		Republican	October 20, 1870	Member of the South Carolina House of Representatives	Joanna, South Carolina	Ku Klux Klan	Racism	
Wade Perrin	Main article: Assassination of Wade Perrin Perrin was captured by a group of Ku Klux Klan members while walking along the street. The men ordered Perrin to do a series of actions, such as dancing, singing, praying, and finally to run away. When Perrin began to run away he was shot and killed.							
J. Goldsteen Dupree		Republican	1873	Former member of the Texas House of Representatives		Ku Klux Klan (alleged)	Dupree's campaigning for Edmund J. Davis' re-election (alleged)	
J. Goldsteen Dupree	Dupree was killed sometime in 1873 by a group of white men. While not much is known about the circumstances, the men were believed to have been part of the Ku Klux Klan and had killed him due to Dupree's campaigning for Davis.							
Elisha G. Johnson		Republican	July 21, 1875	Member of the Florida Senate	Lake City, Florida	Unknown	Unknown	
Elisha G. Johnson	Johnson was a member of the Florida Senate at a time when it was evenly split between Democrats and Republicans. While closing his store at night, he was shot and killed with a shotgun. This gave Democrats a majority in the legislature, but they denied involvement. It was one of many attacks against Republicans in Florida during this period.							
Joseph Crews		Republican	September 8, 1875 (incident); September 13, 1875 (death)	Member of the South Carolina House of Representatives	Laurens County, South Carolina	Francis McGann	Unknown	
Joseph Crews	Crews was ambushed by McGann while riding in a buggy across a creek and was struck by five shotgun pellets, one of which pierced his spine and paralyzed him. Crews would succumb to his injuries five days later. McGann alleged he had been hired by Republicans Cullen Lark and John Hamilton to kill Crews, but both were released due to a lack of evidence.							
Charles Caldwell		Republican	December 30, 1875	Member of the Mississippi State Senate	Clinton, Mississippi	Several assailants	Racism	
Charles Caldwell	Caldwell was killed by white vigilantes as one of many attacks on black Mississippians. Some time after his house was vandalized and his neighbors were killed, a friend lured him into an ambush where he was shot by a mob.							
Alfred Rush			May 13, 1876	Member of the South Carolina House of Representatives	Florence County, South Carolina	Unknown	Attacks on Republicans	
Alfred Rush	Rush and his wife Aggy were returning home from an election campaign picnic at a church near Timmonsville when the couple stopped at a creek to let their horses drink. While stopped, Rush was shot in the heart and instantly killed. A neighbor, William D. Purvis, was tried for Rush's killing, but he was acquitted.							
Simon P. Coker		Republican	September 1876	Member of the South Carolina House of Representatives	Aiken County, South Carolina	White race rioters	Suppression of African American voters	
Simon P. Coker	Main article: Ellenton massacre Coker was among between 25 to 100 African Americans killed by a mob of between 500 to 600 white men from Georgia who spread out in the area of Aiken County to attack and kill freedmen. Coker was allegedly killed while pleading for his life.							
Louis Cardis		Republican	October 10, 1877	Member of the Texas House of Representatives	El Paso, Texas	Charles Howard	Argument during the San Elizario Salt War	
Louis Cardis	Cardis was one of several politicians in El Paso who tried to seize control of the Guadalupe Peak salt deposits from local Mexican–Americans. He became enemies with his former friend Howard, a district judge, and they had physical altercations on two separate occasions. Howard tried to claim the deposits for himself, and a mob captured him when he arrested two Mexican–American men for trying to access the deposits. He was released on the condition of leaving, but he returned to El Paso to kill Cardis, shooting him twice with a shotgun. Howard fled, but he returned in December to reassert his claim over the deposits and was shot by a Mexican firing squad.							
W. H. H. Tison		Democratic	December 4, 1882	Speaker of the Mississippi House of Representatives	Baldwyn, Mississippi	J. Edward Sanders	Retaliation for an attack	
W. H. H. Tison	Tison was walking in front of Sanders' store when Sanders stood at the door and shot Tison with a shotgun. Tison died instantly. Tison and his brothers had beaten Sanders the previous week following a feud between Sanders and the Tison family. Sanders was arrested shortly after the assassination.							
Harriel G. Geiger		Greenback Party	May 19, 1886 (incident); June 11, 1886 (death)	Former member of the Texas House of Representatives	Hearne, Texas	O.D. Cannon	Racism	
Harriel G. Geiger	Geiger was a black man who became a lawyer after leaving the Texas House of Representatives. He was disliked by the racist white citizens of the region. While Geiger was defending a former slave in court, O.D. Cannon took offense to something Geiger said and shot him five times, fatally wounding him.							
Samuel Newitt Wood		Republican	June 23, 1891	Member of the Kansas Senate	Hugoton, Kansas	James Brennan	Unknown	
Samuel Newitt Wood	Wood's friend-turned-enemy Judge Theodosius Botkin appointed Wood's enemy William O'Connor as county attorney, allowing him to persecute Wood. Wood went to Hugoton for a court appearance on one of O'Connor's charges against him despite fears that his political opponents there may harm him. Wood went into the courtroom to check the docket, and as he came out Brennan shot him with a pistol from behind. Wood ran, but Brennan pursued before shooting him again in the back and then in the head. He died fifteen or twenty minutes later. Sheriff Cann was at the court and tried to arrest Brennan, but after a standoff Cann said he would submit to Sheriff Weir of Morton County. Botkin and O'Connor were accused by the Democratic Party and other opposition parties of orchestrating the assassination. Brennan was released when an impartial jury could not be formed, and he fled the state in fear of retaliation from Wood's allies. A new attempt to prosecute him failed when a court in Oklahoma refused to extradite him to Kansas.							
A. J. Rosier		Republican	April 15, 1932	Member of the Wyoming Senate	Rawlins, Wyoming	Thomas Lacey	Rosier's refusal to represent Lacey in a lawsuit Lacey had filed	
A. J. Rosier	Lacey requested that Rosier, who was also an attorney, to represent him in a lawsuit against the authorities who had arrested and convicted him on gambling charges. Rosier refused, and Lacey decided to kill him in retaliation. Lacey followed Rosier into a local bank and shot him once in the back, fatally wounding him, before fleeing and dying by suicide.							
Albert J. Prignano		Democratic	December 29, 1935	Member of the Illinois House of Representatives	Chicago, Illinois	Organized crime	Unknown	
Albert J. Prignano	Robbed, then shot by three gunmen on his doorstep after arriving home with his family. Former associate of Al Capone. Various theories for motive.							
John M. Bolton		Democratic	July 9, 1936	Member of the Illinois House of Representatives	Chicago, Illinois	Organized crime	Revenge linked to organized crime	
John M. Bolton	Shot with shotgun in back of the head following a car chase that ended at Washtenaw Avenue and Harrison Street shortly after midnight. Specific assailants not identified. Possibly killed due to being unsuccessful in assisting certain prisoners in Joliet Penitentiary in getting parole. John's brother was Joseph "Red" Bolton, himself killed two years later in 1938, a former associate of Al Capone.							
Albert Patterson		Democratic	June 18, 1954	Member of the Alabama Senate; Nominee for Attorney General of Alabama	Phenix City, Alabama	Unknown	Patterson's campaign against organized crime	
Albert Patterson	Patterson was the Democratic nominee to be Attorney General of Alabama when he was shot three times as he was leaving his law office and getting in his car. He died minutes later. Governor Gordon Persons declared limited martial law and had state officials replace local prosecutors and investigators. Over the following months, hundreds of people connected to organized crime were indicted and the crime syndicate was dismantled. Patterson's son John was elected attorney general. The assailant was never identified, but chief deputy Albert Fuller was sentenced to life in prison for his involvement.							
Leon Jordan		Democratic	July 15, 1970	Member of the Missouri House of Representatives	Kansas City, Missouri	Unknown	Unknown	
Leon Jordan	Jordan was shot three times with a shotgun by multiple assailants while he was leaving his tavern. The Mafia is alleged to have been involved.							
Larry Kuriyama		Democratic	October 23, 1970	Member of the Hawaii Senate	ʻAiea, Hawaii	Ronald K. Ching	Unknown	
Larry Kuriyama	Kuriyama was shot by Ching in the parking garage of his home as he returned from a political rally. Ching was a professional hitman and had been hired to assassinate Kuriyama.							
Turk Scott		Democratic	July 13, 1973	Member of the Maryland House of Delegates	Baltimore, Maryland	Unknown	Heroin trafficking	
Turk Scott	In April 1973, Scott was indicted on federal charges of having trafficked almost 40 pounds of heroin between New York and Baltimore during 1971 and 1972. On July 13, 1973, Scott was found dead in the parking garage of his apartment, having been killed by two shotgun blasts, shot several times with a small caliber handgun, and cut on the throat. An organization calling itself "Black October" claimed responsibility for Scott's killing, with an anonymous individual affiliated with the organization telling a reporter for The Baltimore Sun specific details about the murder shortly after Scott was killed.							
Tommy Burks		Democratic	October 19, 1998	Member of the Tennessee Senate	Monterey, Tennessee	Byron Looper	Election	
Tommy Burks	Burks was assassinated by his opponent, Byron Looper, in his reelection campaign for the Tennessee Senate. Burks was driving his truck when he was shot. Looper was convicted for the killing. Burks' widow Charlotte Burks took his place as a candidate and was elected to succeed him in the Tennessee Senate.							
Bill Gwatney		Democratic	August 13, 2008	Former member of the Arkansas Senate; Chair of the Democratic Party of Arkansas	Little Rock, Arkansas	Timothy Dale Johnson	Unknown	
Bill Gwatney	Gwatney was shot by Johnson in the headquarters of the Democratic Party of Arkansas, dying from his wounds four hours later. Johnson had entered the building and shot Gwatney after being fired from his job at Target. Johnson led police in a car chase, and he was killed by police after he began shooting at them.							
Clementa C. Pinckney		Democratic	June 17, 2015	Member of the South Carolina Senate	Charleston, South Carolina	Dylann Roof	White supremacy	
Clementa C. Pinckney	Main article: Charleston church shooting Pinckney was part of a bible study group at the Emanuel African Methodist Episcopal Church where he was reverend when Roof entered and asked to join. Roof participated for nearly an hour before he drew a gun and began shooting people in the church. Pinckney and eight others were killed. Roof was captured in North Carolina the following morning.							
Melissa Hortman		DFL	June 14, 2025	Member of the Minnesota House of Representatives	Brooklyn Park, Minnesota	Vance Boelter	Shifting balance of power in Minnesota House of Representatives and Minnesota Senate	
Melissa Hortman	Main article: 2025 shootings of Minnesota legislators Hortman and her husband, Mark were shot and killed in their home by Boelter, who was impersonating a police officer and wearing a silicone mask. State Senator John Hoffman and his wife were also shot and injured at their home in nearby Champlin. Boelter also approached the homes of State Representative Kristin Bahner and State Senator Ann Rest, but Bahner was on vacation and a police officer had already been called to Rest's home.							

=== State judges ===
Politician	Portrait	Party	Date	Office	Location	Assassin	Motive	Ref
E. L. Bramlette		Republican	March 6, 1871	Judge of the Mississippi Circuit Courts	Meridian, Mississippi	Warren Tyler	Retaliation for Bramlette residing over his case	
E. L. Bramlette	Main article: Meridian race riot of 1871 Amid Ku Klux Klan violence in Mississippi, the sheriff and other officials rounded up Tyler and two other freedmen and charged them with inciting a riot. During their trial, Tyler opened fire, killing the white Republican judge Bramlette and a police officer. This resulted in the a race riot, in which white mobs killed 30 Black people and drove the Republican mayor out of office. Tyler jumped out of a window and was killed by a pursuing white mob.							
John Milton Elliott		Democratic	March 26, 1879	Judge of the Kentucky Court of Appeals	Frankfort, Kentucky	Thomas Buford	Retaliation for a court ruling	
John Milton Elliott	Elliott was in front of the Capitol Hotel with Judge Thomas M. Hines when he was shot by Buford with a shotgun. Buford had invited the men to go hunting and then for a drink, but they declined. Elliott was killed instantly, and Buford turned himself in to the deputy sheriff who approached them. After his arrest, Buford explained that he had killed Elliott in retaliation for a ruling the court made against his family. Buford was sent to an asylum but escaped and fled to Indiana.							
Harold Haley			August 7, 1970	Judge of the California Superior Court	San Rafael, California	Jonathan P. Jackson, James McClain, Ruchell Magee, and William Christmas	Attempt to coerce the release of George Jackson and the Soledad Brothers	
Harold Haley	Main article: Marin County Civic Center attacks § August 7, 1970, attack Jackson attacked the Marin County Civic Center during the trial for McClain which Healey was residing over and took hostages. Jackson freed McClain, Magee, and Christmas who were being held at the courthouse. Haley was forced to call the police in an attempt to prevent them from interfering before a sawed off shotgun was taped to his head and was forced alongside four other hostages into a van as the police surrounded the group, but did not intervene. The kidnappers were stopped by a roadblock and engaged in a shootout with police, during which Haley was shot in the chest and by the shotgun.							
James Lawless			June 3, 1974	Judge of a Washington Superior Court	Washington	Ricky Anthony Young		
James Lawless	Lawless was killed in a mail bombing.							
Henry Gentile			1983	Illinois judge	Illinois		Disagreement over a divorce case	
Henry Gentile	Gentile was killed by a man whose divorce case he was hearing. The assailant smuggled a gun into the courtroom by hiding it under the blanket on his wheelchair.							
Vincent Sherry			September 14, 1987	Judge of a Mississippi Circuit Court	Mississippi		Involvement in a prison scam	
Vincent Sherry	Sherry and his wife were killed in their home. Sherry shared a law office with Mayor Pete Halat, who had carried out a scam with the prison system. According to prosecutors, Halat believed Sherry had taken money from the scam.							
Vickie Bunnell			August 19, 1997	Colebrook District Court judge; former Columbia selectperson	Colebrook, New Hampshire	Carl Drega	Retaliation for mediating a dispute between Drega and a tax assessor	
Vickie Bunnell	Drega killed state troopers Scott Phillips and Leslie Lord in a supermarket parking lot after Phillips had stopped him for having too much rust on his pickup truck. After killing the officers, Drega stole Lord's car and drove to Bunnell's office, where he shot her from behind as she ran away. Local newspaper editor Dennis Joos, whose offices were in the same building, attempted to disarm Drega, but was also killed. After setting his own house on fire, Drega fled to nearby Bloomfield, Vermont, where he was killed in a shoot-out with police.							
H. George Taylor			March 18, 1999	Los Angeles County Court Commissioner	Rancho Cucamonga, California	Unknown	Unknown	
H. George Taylor	Taylor and his wife were killed in their home.							
Rowland Barnes			March 11, 2005	Judge of the Georgia Superior Court	Atlanta, Georgia	Brian Nichols	Retaliation for Barnes residing over his case	
Rowland Barnes	Nichols, who was on trial for rape, overpowered a lone guard who was overseeing him and stole her revolver after beating her. Nichols went to Barnes' chamber and opened fire, killing him, a court reporter, and a police officer. Nichols also killed a federal agent who attempted to apprehend him before he was taken into custody.							
John Pier Roemer			June 3, 2022	Former judge of the Wisconsin Circuit Court	New Lisbon, Wisconsin	Douglas K. Uhde	Retaliation for Roemer sentencing Uhde (suspected)	
John Pier Roemer	Roemer was shot and killed in his home by Uhde who then died by suicide. Roemer had sentenced Uhde to prison for a burglary charge in 2005. Uhde also had a list of other potential targets including Wisconsin governor Tony Evers and Michigan governor Gretchen Whitmer.							
Andrew Wilkinson			October 19, 2023	Judge of the Washington County Circuit Court	Maryland			
Andrew Wilkinson	Wilkinson was shot in his driveway. He had ruled against the assailant in a child custody case.							
Kevin Mullins			September 19, 2024	Judge of the Kentucky District Court	Whitesburg, Kentucky	Suspect in custody	Psychosis and potential sexual extortion (suspected)	
Kevin Mullins	Main article: Killing of Kevin Mullins Mullins was shot multiple times by a gunman who entered his chambers, killing him.							

=== Miscellaneous state offices ===
Politician	Portrait	Party	Date	Office	Location	Assassin	Motive	Ref
Solomon P. Sharp		Democratic-Republican	November 7, 1825	Kentucky Attorney General; Member-elect of the Kentucky Senate	Frankfort, Kentucky	Jereboam O. Beauchamp	Sharp being a former lover of Beauchamp's wife; disputed political motives	
Solomon P. Sharp	Main article: Beauchamp–Sharp Tragedy Sharp was rumored to have had a sexual encounter with Anna Cooke, who later married Beauchamp. The couple decided to kill Sharp to defend her honor. Beauchamp went to Sharp's house early in the morning, and when Sharp answered the door, Beauchamp stabbed him in the chest with a dagger. Beauchamp was determined to be the most likely suspect, and he ultimately found guilty. On the day of his hanging, he and Cooke stabbed themselves in a double suicide, but he survived long enough to be hanged in the first legal hanging in Kentucky's history. Sharp's political allies alleged that their opponents had enticed Beauchamp to kill him.							
Robert Marshall Love		Democratic	June 30, 1903	Texas Comptroller of Public Accounts	Austin, Texas	William G. Hill	Retaliation for losing job	
Robert Marshall Love	Love was sitting at his desk inside the Texas State Capitol. William G. Hill, a former clerk of Love's who had been fired, entered his office and placed a letter on his desk. After a brief conversation, Love began to read the letter and while reading Hill shot him twice in the chest. Hill fled the scene but was tackled by bystanders outside of the building and killed himself in the scuffle.							

== Local offices ==
=== Mayors ===
Politician	Portrait	Party	Date	Office	Location	Assassin	Motive	Ref
Joseph Smith		Reform	June 27, 1844	Mayor of Nauvoo, Illinois; presidential candidate	Carthage, Illinois	The Carthage Greys	Anti-Mormonism	
Joseph Smith	Main article: Killing of Joseph Smith Smith's opponents published a newspaper criticizing him, so he had the Nauvoo Legion destroy their press. Smith declared martial law after unrest broke out, so Governor Thomas Ford ordered the arrest of Smith and his brother Hyrum. A militia, the Carthage Greys, stormed the jail and shot Hyrum. Joseph Smith injured some of the attackers with a pistol that had been smuggled to him, but he was shot as he tried to escape through the window. He was then dragged aside and shot several more times.							
Joseph G. Crane			June 8, 1869	Provisional mayor of Jackson, Mississippi	Jackson, Mississippi	Edward M. Yerger	Seizure of a piano	
Joseph G. Crane	Crane was stabbed to death by Yerger, a newspaper owner, on the steps of the Mississippi State Capitol. Yerger was responding to the seizure of his piano, which was taken to auction because he owed back taxes. Yerger was arrested, and he was defended by his uncle, former Supreme Court of Mississippi justice William Yerger. They filed a writ of habeas corpus when he was brought before a military tribunal, but it was denied, and the Supreme Court of the United States sustained the denial in Ex parte Yerger. Yerger was taken into the custody of civilian law enforcement following a negotiation, but he left the state after he was released on bail and was never tried.							
John B. Bowman			November 20, 1885	Mayor of East St. Louis, Illinois	East St. Louis, Illinois	Unknown		
John B. Bowman	Bowman was killed in front of his home by an unknown assailant.							
Carter Harrison III		Democratic	October 28, 1893	Mayor of Chicago	Chicago, Illinois	Patrick Eugene Prendergast	Assailant was rejected for appointment to a patronage post as corporation counsel	
Carter Harrison III	Main article: Assassination of Carter Harrison III Harrison was shot four times by Prendergast with a pistol. Prendergast had claimed to be "a city official" and was allowed to enter the home to meet with Harrison. Harrison's coachman came to the scene and engaged in a gunfight with Prendergast, but no one was hit and Prendergast got away. Harrison died from his wounds about 30 minutes later. Prendergast turned himself in to the police shortly after. He explained that Harrison refused to appoint him as corporation counsel. After a trial centered on whether he was sane when committing the crime, Prendergast was sentenced to death. After a further proceeding on to Prendergast's fitness to be executed, he was hanged the following July.							
James Balbirnie		Republican	June 29, 1899	Mayor of Muskegon, Michigan	Muskegon, Michigan	J. W. Tayer	Not being reappointed	
James Balbirnie	Tayer, a former director for Balbirnie, shot and killed him as he stood in the doorway of his store. Tayer then drank carbolic acid and shot himself.							
John Emmett Walker			March 6, 1911	Mayor of Pineville, Louisiana; judge	Pineville, Louisiana	William McManus	Retaliation for his son's arrest	
John Emmett Walker	Robert McManus, a white man, threatened a group of Black teenagers with gunshots after they drove by a McManus family wake on a hayride. Robert McManus was arrested and given a $25 fine, and Walker, who was also the elected judge, ruled against him. Robert's father William McManus, upset that Walker sided with the Black teenagers over his son, shot and killed him on Main Street a year later. William McManus served 13 years in prison for killing Walker; McManus's nephew Fred Baden was elected mayor of Pineville in 1970.							
Anton Cermak		Democratic	February 15, 1933 (incident); March 6, 1933 (death)	Mayor of Chicago	Miami, Florida	Giuseppe Zangara	Anti-capitalism; intended attack on Franklin D. Roosevelt	
Anton Cermak	Cermak met with president-elect Franklin D. Roosevelt during a speech in Miami when Zangara fired five gunshots at them from the crowd. Missing Roosevelt, Zangara hit Cermak and four other people. Cermak was hospitalized and began to recover, but he died of sepsis weeks later. The other four victims survived, and Zangara was executed by electric chair on March 20.							
Louis F. Edwards		Democratic	November 15, 1939	Mayor of Long Beach, New York	Long Beach, New York	Alvin Dooley	Retaliation for disciplinary action and losing reelection	
Louis F. Edwards	Edwards came into conflict with Dooley, president of the police union, after Dooley criticized his heavy-handed approach on crime. Edwards responded by demoting Dooley from his position on the motorcycle squad and ensuring Dooley lost his reelection as union president to Edwards' bodyguard James Walsh. When Dooley was assigned to a police booth outside of Edwards' house, Edwards smiled as he and Walsh walked by. Dooley responded by shooting Edwards with a revolver. Walsh tried to stop Dooley and was shot and injured during the scuffle. Dooley then went to where Edwards lay and shot him two more times in the back. He turned himself in and served ten years in prison.							
George Moscone		Democratic	November 27, 1978	Mayor of San Francisco	San Francisco, California	Dan White	Moscone's refusal to reinstate White	
George Moscone	Main article: Moscone–Milk assassinations Moscone was killed by former city supervisor Dan White, who had resigned days prior. White changed his mind and wished to be reappointed, but Moscone was considering other candidates. White went into Moscone's office, spoke to him briefly, then shot him three times with a revolver. White then killed city supervisor Harvey Milk and turned himself in. He was sentenced to seven years in prison and paroled after five.							
Russell G. Lloyd Sr.		Republican	March 19, 1980 (incident); March 21, 1980 (death)	Former mayor of Evansville, Indiana	Evansville, Indiana	Julia Van Orden	Mental illness, hostility toward the city	
Russell G. Lloyd Sr.	Lloyd was shot at his home by Van Orden following an argument, months after his term ended. Van Orden believed that Lloyd was still the incumbent mayor and was angry with the city government. Lloyd died after spending two days comatose, while Van Orden was declared insane and sentenced to 40 years.							
Edward M. King			December 10, 1986	Mayor of Mount Pleasant, Iowa	Mount Pleasant, Iowa	Ralph Davis	Anger over backed-up sewer	
Edward M. King	During a city council meeting, Davis entered and shot Mayor King and two city councilmembers, Ron Dupree and Joann Elizabeth Sankey. Witnesses said Davis shot the mayor and Dupree twice, execution-style. Davis had previously spoken at a city council meeting over a malfunctioning city sewer that was backed up and damaged his basement. He had asked the city to pay for damages and was referred to the Sanitation Committee, which Dupree was the chairman of.							
Mike Swoboda			February 7, 2008 (incident); September 6, 2008 (death)	Mayor of Kirkwood, Missouri	Kirkwood, Missouri	Charles Lee "Cookie" Thornton	Retaliation for municipal fines	
Mike Swoboda	Main article: Kirkwood City Council shooting Swoboda was killed during an attack on the Kirkwood City Council. Thornton had accumulated numerous fines and believed that the council was discriminating against him on the basis of race. He opened fire on the council with two handguns. He killed five people, while Swoboda and a reporter were injured. Thornton was then killed by police. Swoboda was shot in the jaw and the back of his head, and he died of his injuries seven months later.							

=== County officers ===
Politician	Portrait	Party	Date	Office	Location	Assassin	Motive	Ref
John Quincy Dickinson		Republican	April 3, 1871	Clerk of Court of Jackson County, Florida	Marianna, Florida	Unknown	White supremacy	
John Quincy Dickinson	Main article: Jackson County War Dickinson was walking home from work when a group of unknown assassins, widely believed to be Klansmen, fired 13-14 buckshot rounds at him before one assassin approached Dickinson's body and shot him in his heart.							

=== City council members ===
Politician	Portrait	Party	Date	Office	Location	Assassin	Motive	Ref
Harvey Milk		Democratic	November 27, 1978	City Supervisor of San Francisco	San Francisco, California	Dan White	Milk's objection to White's reinstatement	
Harvey Milk	Main article: Moscone–Milk assassinations Milk was killed by former city supervisor Dan White after discouraging mayor George Moscone from reinstating him. White had resigned from the position and then changed his mind, but Milk suggested a different candidate to Moscone. White entered city hall and shot Moscone with a revolver. Before anyone realized that Moscone was dead, White asked Milk for a private conversation and then shot him as well. White then turned himself in. He was sentenced to seven years in prison and paroled after five.							
James E. Davis		Democratic	July 23, 2003	New York City Councilman	New York City, New York	Othniel Askew	Assailant was a prospective electoral challenger	
James E. Davis	Davis had befriended Askew after convincing him not to run for Davis's seat on the city council. Davis invited Askew to join him at city hall in the visitor's gallery, where Askew smuggled in a pistol and shot Davis, killing him. A security officer then shot and killed Askew.							
Connie Karr and Michael H.T. Lynch			February 7, 2008	Councilmembers of Kirkwood City Council	Kirkwood, Missouri	Charles Lee "Cookie" Thornton	Retaliation for municipal fines	
Connie Karr and Michael H.T. Lynch	Main article: Kirkwood City Council shooting Karr and Lynch were killed during an attack on the Kirkwood City Council.							
Eunice Dwumfour		Republican	February 1, 2023	Member of the Sayreville Borough Council	Sayreville, New Jersey	Rashid Ali Bynum		
Eunice Dwumfour	Dwumfour was found dead in her car with gunshot wounds. Bynum, a former member of Dwumfour's congregation as a priest, was arrested for her murder four months later. Bynum was found guilty in June 2025.							

=== Other municipal officials ===
Politician	Portrait	Party	Date	Office	Location	Assassin	Motive	Ref
Ken Yost			February 7, 2008	Public Works Director of Kirkwood	Kirkwood, Missouri	Charles Lee "Cookie" Thornton	Retaliation for municipal fines	
Ken Yost	Main article: Kirkwood City Council shooting Yost was killed during an attack on the Kirkwood City Council.							

=== Law enforcement ===
Politician	Portrait	Party	Date	Office	Location	Assassin	Motive	Ref
William J. Brady			April 1, 1878	Lincoln County Sheriff	Lincoln, New Mexico	Lincoln County Regulators and Billy the Kid	Revenge for John Tunstall's death	
William J. Brady	Tunstall, an ally of the Lincoln County Regulators and Billy the Kid, was shot and killed by Lincoln County deputies for his role in the Lincoln County War on February 18, 1878 at his ranch. Brady and four of his deputies were ambushed by the Regulators and Billy the Kid as they walked down the main street of Lincoln, killing Brady and deputy George W. Hindman.							
David Hennessy			October 16, 1890	Police Chief of the New Orleans Police Department	New Orleans, Louisiana	Mafia (suspected)	Retaliation for Hennessy's anti-Mafia work (suspected)	
David Hennessy	Main article: 1891 New Orleans lynchings Hennessy was walking home when he was ambushed and fatally shot by multiple assailants. Hennessy had reportedly whispered a derogatory slur for Italians when asked who had shot him before he succumbed to his injuries. Police rounded up hundreds of men of Italian heritage, and ultimately 19 of them were convicted for Hennessy's death. However, when nine of the convicted went on trial, six were acquitted and three had mistrials. The following day, a mob assembled outside of the prison where the men were being held and stormed it, lynching 11 of them.							
John A. Holmes			September 18, 1929	Hutchinson County District Attorney	Borger, Texas	Unknown	Suspected retaliation for campaign against organized crime and bootlegging	
John A. Holmes	Holmes was shot and killed by an unknown assailant during a period in which organized crime had a large influence in the city of Borger. As a result of his death, Governor Dan Moody ordered Hutchinson County placed under martial law and sent in the Texas Rangers to restore order.							
Jack Burris			June 1952	Mayes County District Attorney	Locust Grove, Oklahoma	Unknown	Retaliation for crackdown on illegal gambling and bootlegging (suspected)	
Jack Burris	Burris was ambushed outside of his home and killed with a shotgun blast. Burris' wife said she heard a vehicle fleeing from their home after he had been shot, but investigators were unable to determine who killed Burris and for what reason, although they did suspect it was in retaliation for Burris' crackdown on illegal gambling and bootlegging in the area.							
William Cann			June 11, 1974	Union City Police Chief	Union City, California	Leonard Baca	Revenge for the death of Alberto Terrones	
William Cann	Main article: Assassination of William Cann During a community meeting at a Catholic church to address unrest, Cann was shot through a window by Leonard Baca, fatally wounding him. After shooting Cann, Baca continued to fire and injured three others.							
Sam Catron			April 13, 2002	Pulaski County Sheriff	Stab, Kentucky	Danny Shelley	Attempt to replace Catron with Jeff Morris	
Sam Catron	Main article: Murder of Sam Catron As Catron left a political rally Danny Shelley sniped Catron, killing him. Shelley was apprehended while attempting to flee and it was determined that former deputy Jeff Morris and drug-dealer Kenneth White had conspired with Shelley to have Catron assassinated.							

== Tribal government ==
Politician	Portrait	Party	Date	Office	Location	Assassin	Motive	Ref
Elias Boudinot		Treaty Party	June 22, 1839	Member of the Cherokee Nation Tribal Council	Park Hill, Oklahoma	Supporters of John Ross	Retaliation for signing the Treaty of New Echota	
Elias Boudinot	An armed group of Cherokee attacked Boudinot's home and killed him in retaliation for Boudinot and other Treaty Party members signing the Treaty of New Echota without the support of Cherokee chief John Ross and the majority support of the Cherokee Nation Tribal Council. The treaty facilitated the Cherokee removal.							
John Ridge		Treaty Party	June 22, 1839	Member of the Cherokee Nation Tribal Council	McIntosh County, Oklahoma	Supporters of John Ross	Retaliation for signing the Treaty of New Echota	
John Ridge	Ridge was killed by an armed group of Cherokee for signing off on the Treaty of New Echota.							
Major Ridge		Treaty Party	June 22, 1839	Member of the Cherokee Nation Tribal Council	Washington County, Arkansas	Supporters of John Ross	Retaliation for signing the Treaty of New Echota	
Major Ridge	Ridge was ambushed by a group of armed Cherokee as he rode along a road in retaliation for signing off on the Treaty of New Echota. Ridge was shot five times and killed.							
Fred Alvarez			Rancho Mirage, California	July 1, 1981	Vice Chairman of the Cabazon Band	Unknown	Prevention of whistleblowing	
Fred Alvarez	Alvarez and two friends were shot and killed by a suspected hitman in front of Alvarez's house. Alvarez previously reported that he had information which made him a target. This may have been related to alleged money-skimming by casino managers or to an alleged weapons-testing deal. A suspect was extradited to California in 2009, but the charges were dropped.							
Rurik Davis, Angel Penn, Glenn Calonicco, and Sheila Lynn Russo			February 20, 2014	Members of the Cedarville Rancheria Tribal Council (Davis, Penn, and Calonicco), Tribal Administrator (Russo)	Alturas, California	Cherie Lash Rhoades	Retaliation for being removed as Tribal Chairperson and being evicted	
Rurik Davis, Angel Penn, Glenn Calonicco, and Sheila Lynn Russo	Rhoades was the former Chairperson of the Cedarville Rancheria who had been suspended due to a federal investigation into allegations she had embezzled $50,000 from the tribe. During a council meeting to decide whether to evict her and her son, Rhoades opened fire on councilmembers, killing four people, three of whom (Davis, Penn, and Calonicco) were also relatives of Rhoades. After running out of bullets, she stabbed and injured another member before being arrested. She was sentenced to death.							

== Non-officeholding politicians ==
Politician	Portrait	Party	Date	Location	Assassin	Motive	Ref
George W. Ashburn		Republican	March 31, 1868	Columbus, Georgia	Several unknown assailants	Ashburn's support for African American rights	
George W. Ashburn	Ashburn was shot in his home after several masked assailants broke in. Multiple groups were accused, including the Ku Klux Klan, conservatives, or spurned allies who wished to seize influence from Ashburn. He had been preparing to campaign for a seat in the United States Senate, and he was previously a delegate to the Georgia Constitutional Convention of 1867–1868.						
Franklin Sinclair		Republican	April 16, 1868	Morehouse Parish, Louisiana	James Payne (alleged)	To stop Sinclair's election to the Louisiana House of Representatives	
Franklin Sinclair	Sinclair, who was running for a seat in the Louisiana House of Representatives, was returning home on horseback from a political rally a day before the election when he was allegedly shot and killed near Bonita by Payne, a white plantation owner who had been working to elect Sinclair's Democratic opponent. Payne admitted to shooting Sinclair, but claimed that it was in self-defense and a kangaroo court found him not guilty. After that, however, Payne was arrested by the Marshals Service, but he was released on bond and subsequently disappeared. O. H. Brewster was selected to replace Sinclair and won the seat.						
John Lemon		Republican	August 27, 1871	Mesilla, New Mexico Territory	I. N. Kelly	Mesilla Riot	
John Lemon	Lemon was a local Republican party leader and candidate for Probate Judge. At a rally in Mesilla prior to election day rival political factions met on the town square. After a confrontation, Lemon was fatally struck over the head by Democratic newspaper printer I. N. Kelley, who in turn was shot and killed. The following riot resulted in nine deaths and around 50 injuries.						
John M. Clayton		Republican	January 29, 1889	Plumerville, Arkansas	Unknown assailant	Unknown motive	
John M. Clayton	Clayton was staying at a boarding house in Plumerville investigating election fraud that caused him to lose his House race. Buckshot was fired through the window of his room, killing him. The assassin was never found. Clayton was later determined to be the winner of the election.						
George Lincoln Rockwell		American Nazi	August 25, 1967	Arlington, Virginia	John Patler	Retaliation for the assailant's expulsion from the Nazi Party	
George Lincoln Rockwell	Main article: Assassination of George Lincoln Rockwell Rockwell was shot twice by Patler while getting in his car at a laundromat. Patler, who was firing a pistol from a shopping mall roof, was a Nazi Party member whom Rockwell had expelled months before. Rockwell's body was stolen by the Nazi Party and cremated, and Patler was sentenced to 20 years in prison for the murder and released after 10.						
Derwin Brown		Non-partisan	December 15, 2000	Decatur, Georgia	Melvin Walker	Defeat in sheriff's election	
Derwin Brown	The former DeKalb County sheriff, Sidney Dorsey, arranged to have sheriff-elect Brown, a captain in the DeKalb County Police Department, killed out of bitterness for Brown defeating Dorsey in the county sheriff's election. Dorsey promised former sheriff's deputy Melvin Walker a promotion to deputy sheriff if he carried out the murder and promised the getaway driver and backup shooter, David Ramsey, a job as a detention officer. Walker shot Brown 12 times with a TEC-9 outside Brown's home, killing him.						

== See also ==
- List of members of the United States Congress killed or wounded in office
- List of United States federal judges killed in office
- List of United States ambassadors killed in office
- List of United States presidential assassination attempts and plots
- List of duels in the United States
