= Ross Township Municipal Building shooting =

2013 mass shooting in Pennsylvania, U.S.

Coordinates: 40°53′50″N 75°19′56″W

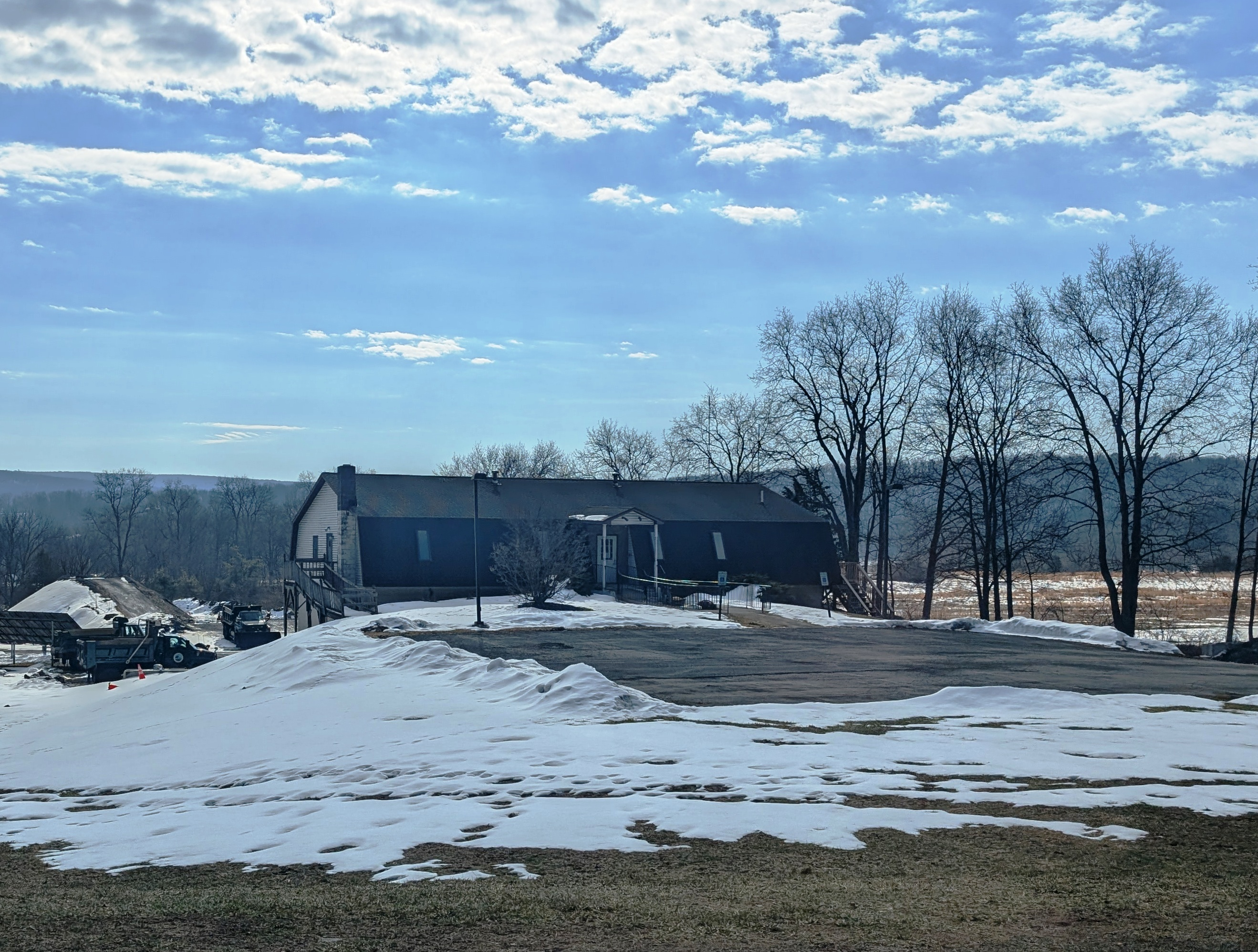
- Ross Township Municipal Building (now Municipal Annex) in 2026, site of the shooting

- Location: Ross Township, Monroe County, Pennsylvania, U.S.
- Date: August 5, 2013
- Attack type: Triple murder, mass shooting
- Weapons: .223 Ruger Mini-14; .44 Magnum 6-shot revolver
- Deaths: 3
- Injuries: 4 (including the perpetrator)
- Perpetrator: Rockne Warren Newell
- Motive: Land dispute

The Ross Township Municipal Building shooting occurred just after 7:00 p.m. on August 5, 2013, in Saylorsburg, Pennsylvania, United States, a small town in Monroe County. A gunman went on a shooting rampage at a public meeting of township supervisors in the municipal building, leaving three people dead and three others injured. The gunman, identified as Rockne Newell, 59, was described as having long feuded with township officials.

== Shooting ==
While approaching the building, Newell fired a .223 Ruger Mini-14 rifle into the building 28 times, through windows. Then, he went back to his car to retrieve a 6-shot .44 Magnum Revolver before entering the building and the meeting room. There, he began shooting the handgun at meeting attendees. While the gunman was still shooting, two men struggled with him over the gun. They subdued, disarmed, and held him, preventing further deaths and injuries.

Linda Kozic, Frank Pirano, and Howard Beers were injured; while David Lee Fleetwood, 62, Linda's husband Gerard, 53, and James "Vinny" LaGuardia, 64, were fatally wounded. During the struggle over the gun with Bernard Kozen and Mark Krashe, the gunman was wounded in the leg with his own weapon.

Newell had about 90 unused pistol bullets in his car, and while being taken to a medical facility by a state trooper, he reportedly said "I wish I killed more of them."

== Legal proceedings ==
Newell was arrested and immediately charged with three counts of homicide and an additional two counts of attempted homicide. Attorneys William Ruzzo and Michael E. Weinstein were assigned to Newell's defense in August 2013, and remained his attorneys for the duration of the trial. Newell pleaded guilty to three counts of first degree murder and attempted murder charges on May 29, 2015, and was sentenced to three life terms as well as an additional 61 to 122 years for the attempted murder charges and is currently imprisoned in the State Correctional Institution – Rockview

== See also ==
- Kirkwood City Council shooting, a similar earlier case
- Carl Drega, a similar earlier case
- Moscone–Milk assassinations, a similar earlier case
- James E. Davis (councilman), a New York City councilman, who was assassinated in city hall
