= Assassination of Wade Perrin =

1870 murder in Joanna, South Carolina, U.S.

- Part of Reconstruction in South Carolina
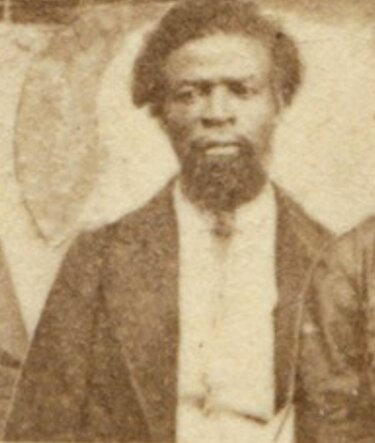
- Perrin pictured in 1870
- Location: Joanna, South Carolina, U.S.
- Date: October 20, 1870; 156 years ago
- Target: Rep. Wade Perrin
- Attack type: Assassination, hate crime
- Perpetrator: Members of the Ku Klux Klan

On October 20, 1870, Wade Perrin, a Republican Party member of the South Carolina House of Representatives, was assassinated by a group of white men affiliated with the Ku Klux Klan. The murder took place in present-day Joanna, South Carolina, in rural southeastern Laurens County. Perrin had been re-elected to a second term in the legislature the day before, but riots in and around Laurens County on the day of the election spurred violence towards at least a dozen Republican members-elect, most of them African Americans. After being caught by the men and being made to dance, sing, and pray, they ordered Perrin to run away, at which point he was shot dead. He was found lying in the street with his pockets turned inside out. Perrin was honored with a funeral service held in the House chambers on January 31, 1871, with the House and State Senate both present. A total of six men were ultimately charged for Perrin's murder, as well as the murders of several other black legislators under similar circumstances.

== Background ==
Wade Perrin, a black man from Laurens County, South Carolina, was first elected to the South Carolina House of Representatives in 1868. He was one of five members of the General Assembly from Laurens County, alongside senator Y. J. P. Owens and representatives Joseph Crews, Griffin Johnson, and Harry McDaniels. He ran for re-election at the conclusion of his two-year term and won said election on October 19, 1870. Perrin also served as a minister in the African Methodist Episcopal Church, and was described in one of his later memorials as having been "faithful and energetic". One newspaper described Perrin as a good clergyman but "not worth his salt" as a legislator.

Prior to the 1870 election, and beginning as early as mid-April, black citizens in several cities and counties began to form "Negro militia companies", many of which were armed. Companies sprang up soon after in Union, Newberry, Edgefield, Kershaw, and Spartanburg counties, as well as in the capital city of Columbia. These groups would attract blame from some as the "immediate cause" of the Klan violence following the election, specifically from James Chesnut Jr., a politician who participated in hearings regarding the Klan but was absolved from association with them, and Gabriel Cannon, a mill entrepreneur who was accused of involvement with the Klan and had faced accusations of threatening freedmen at a party meeting in the past.

== Attack ==
After much action on the part of the Ku Klux Klan surrounding the election of 1868, they had been relatively quiet until just a few days before the 1870 election. Despite intimidation before and at the polls, the Republican Party performed very well in the 1870 elections. As a result of a race riot that took place in Laurens County on the day following the elections, over a dozen Republican members-elect, most of them African American, were killed by white mobs in and around Laurens. Perrin was among the most notable of the victims, having just been elected to his second term. Perrin was close to Crews, who was accused of creating an "uproar" and then running away when trouble began, leaving Perrin to be murdered.

On October 20, while he was walking on the street by Martin's Depot, south of Clinton in present-day Joanna, Perrin was caught by a group of white men affiliated with the Ku Klux Klan. The men ordered Perrin to perform a series of actions based on their instructions: to dance, then sing, then pray, and finally to run away. As Perrin was running, he was shot dead by the men, and ended up sustaining "one or more" bullet wounds. Another minister in South Carolina, Rev. Griffin Johnson, was reported in November 1870 to have been murdered under similar circumstances around the same time as Perrin. Immediately after the election, there were also incidents in which black men who had voted for the Union Reform Party ticket were attacked by crowds of other black men, including in Newberry, Barnwell, and York counties.

Erastus W. Everson, an agent of the Freedmen's Bureau and a witness to the Laurens riot, later testified to have heard members of the legislature return to the courthouse and report the discovery of Perrin's body near Martin's Depot. Perrin was found lying dead with his pockets turned inside out; the men that found him then went to the nearest doctor and asked him to send for the coroner.

== Aftermath ==
Perrin was the subject of a South Carolina House resolution introduced on January 31, 1871, by William James Whipper which honored him and offered condolences on behalf of the legislature. Whipper was a member of a House special committee with the purpose of drafting such a statement. The resolution noted that Perrin "fell a martyr to the assertion of principles of free government and free speech". A copy of the resolution was sent to Perrin's family and the desk of the Speaker of the House, Franklin J. Moses Jr., was ordered to be "draped with mourning" for a thirty-day period. On the same day, the State Senate received a message from the House consisting of an invitation to the House chambers for a funeral oration on Perrin, which took place at 3:00 p.m. on January 31, 1871.

Perrin's body lay in state for a time prior to the funeral service, and afterwards he was reported to have been buried in the same cemetery as Benjamin F. Randolph, a former member of the State Senate who had been assassinated two years prior. As a result, the cemetery, located in Columbia and named for Randolph, was chosen by the State Senate to be the host of a monument in honor of both men. The monument, which was dedicated on February 24, 1871, ended up being only to Randolph, with Perrin ultimately left off.

As was the case with multiple other similar murders, a reward of US$2,500–5,000 was offered by Governor Robert Kingston Scott for the arrest of the killers. An arrest was made in April 1872 for involvement in Perrin's murder when A. D. Henricks (or "Henrichs") was charged with violating the Ku Klux Klan Act. In October 1872, five more men were arrested in connection with the murders: George H. Davidson, John T. Craig, Elihu Young, Charles Franklin, (Note: Franklin's reported name varies, with different sources listing "Charles H. Franklin", "C. E. Franklin", and "Charlie Franklin".) and Munson Buford. The men were charged with "conspiracy to injure, &c., citizens of African descent on account of their suffrage" but were released as a result of a mistrial that December. Young and Franklin were arrested again in May 1875, specifically in connection with Perrin's murder. A man named Josh Kerns, who was an apparent eyewitness to the murder, had submitted an affidavit implicating Young, while Franklin was implicated by Rep. Joseph Crews.
