= Elisha G. Johnson =

American physician and politician

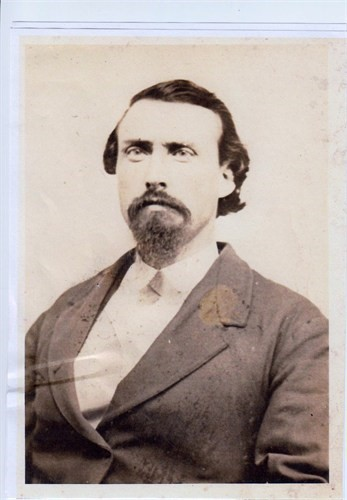

Member of the Florida Senate
- In office 1870–1875

Personal details
- Born: January 11, 1839
- Died: July 21, 1875 (aged 36)

Elisha Graham Johnson (January 11, 1839 – July 21, 1875) was a physician and a member of the Florida Senate whose murder had significant political repercussions.

== Biography ==
Johnson was one of thirteen children of Henry Johnson and Phoebe Hall. He served in the Confederate States Army during the American Civil War with the 69th North Carolina Infantry and rose to the rank of Major. He moved to Florida after the war. He was a physician and a Deputy Collector for the Office of Internal Revenue. He was first elected to the Florida Senate in 1870 following the invalidation of an apparent win by his opponent, Charles Ross, due to election irregularities and a campaign of intimidation of black voters by supporters of Ross. Johnson was allied with the Republican (liberal) faction, at that point tied with conservative Democrats 12–12. The tie was broken by the July 21, 1875 murder of Johnson while searching for a still approximately 10 miles from Fernandina, Florida. Another source says that Johnson had "just closed his general store in Lake City and was walking home when an assassin killed him. That broke a 12-12 stalemate in the state Senate between the Republicans and the Conservatives." Another source says he was killed "at his turpentine facility near his home in Lake City, Florida."

A suspect was arrested and charged with murder approximately two months later. The outcome of the case is not known.

Johnson was survived by his wife Jennie Royal and his father, and is buried in Bosque Bello Cemetery in Fernandina Beach, Florida. A different source says "he was survived by his wife Eliza, who died in 1921 and is buried in the same plot."

== See also ==
- List of assassinated American politicians
