= Louis F. Edwards =

American politician

Mayor of Long Beach, New York
- In office 1937–1939

Personal details
- Born: 1892
- Died: November 15, 1939 (aged 46–47) Long Beach, New York
- Party: Democratic
- Spouse: Claire Reiner
- Children: 5
- Occupation: Businessman, politician

Louis F. Edwards (1892–1939) was an American mayor of Long Beach, New York who was assassinated on November 15, 1939. He was fatally shot by a disgruntled police officer and union official.

== Biography ==
Edwards had a career in The Bronx as a haberdasher and a paint manufacturer, and as President of the Metropolitan Refining Company in Long Island City, Queens – before retiring early on his family's fortune and running for mayor of Long Beach in 1937. He ran on the Democratic Party ticket, after having been defeated four years prior, when he ran on the Good Governance ticket.

=== Death ===
On November 15, 1939, Edwards was fatally shot by a Long Beach Police Department officer at 10:15 AM on the sidewalk in front of his home at 15 West Beech Street as he started for his office; he was aged 47 at the time. Officer Alvin Dooley, former head of the local police union as well as member of the police motorcycle squad and the mayor's own security detail, killed Edwards after losing his bid for reelection as PBA president to a candidate the mayor supported; the assailant also shot and wounded another mayoral bodyguard, the officer who had unseated him. Dooley was tried and convicted of first degree manslaughter and sentenced to a term of ten to twenty years in prison. He was paroled after 10 years in 1949, but was returned to prison in 1959 for parole violation, after he was accused of sexually abusing a girlfriend's adolescent daughter. Dooley died in prison in 1965.

==== Aftermath ====
After the murder, the city residents passed legislation to adopt a city manager system, which still exists to this day. The city manager is hired by and reports to the City Council.

=== Personal life ===
Edwards lived on Beach Street with his wife, Claire Reiner. The couple had five children.

== Honors and legacy ==
Jackson Boulevard in Long Beach was later renamed Edwards Boulevard, in honor of the city's late mayor.

== See also ==
- List of assassinated American politicians
