= Almon Case =

American state legislator (1819–1867)

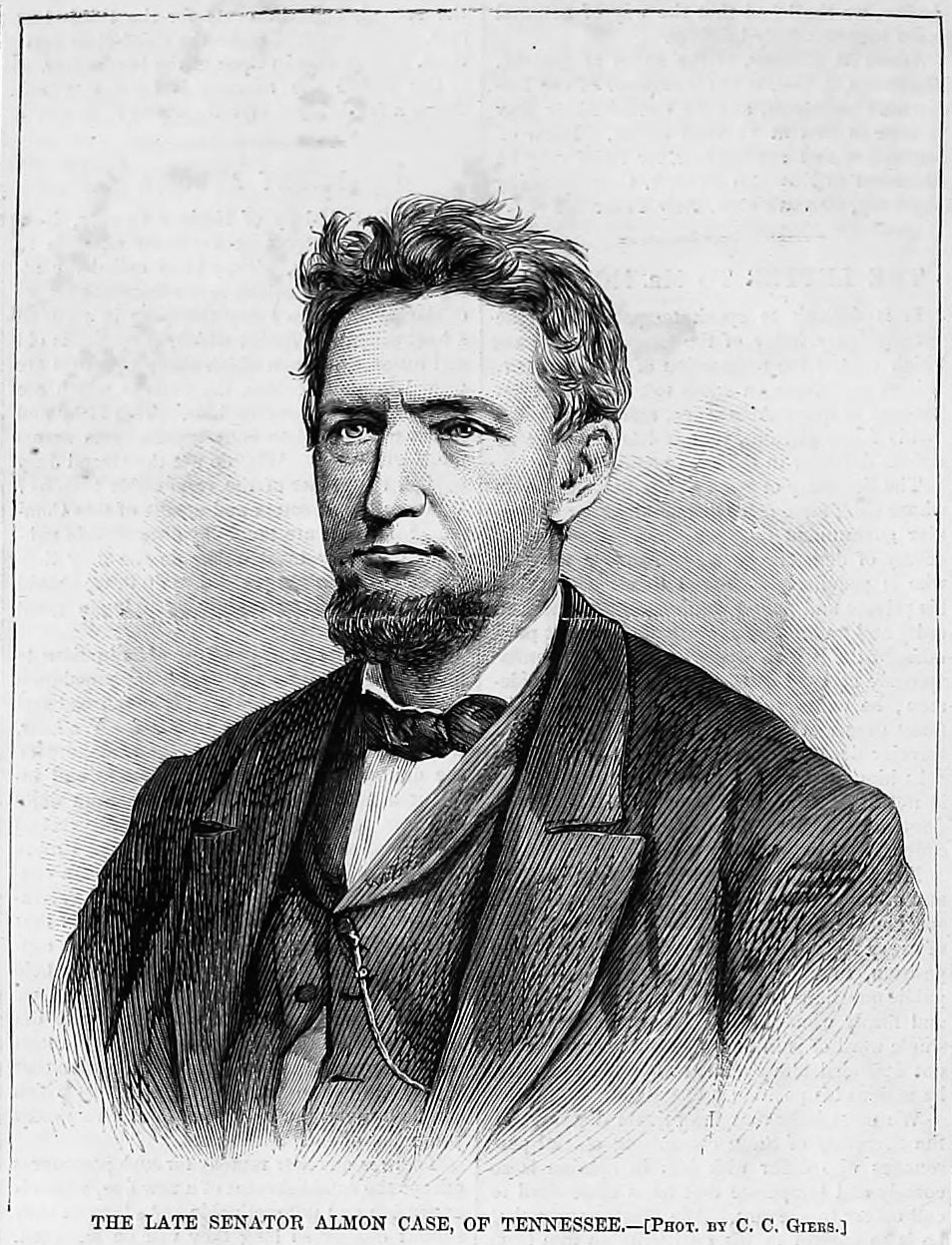
- Born: January 6, 1819; Portage County, Ohio, U.S.
- Died: January 11, 1867 (aged 48); Obion County, Tennessee, U.S.

Dr. Almon Case (January 6, 1819 – January 11, 1867) was an Ohio-born medical doctor and Southern Unionist in Tennessee during the American Civil War. At war's end, he was elected to be a Tennessee state senator, representing the West Tennessee district of Obion County, Henry County, and Weakley County. He was shot and killed in 1867 during the Reconstruction era of the United States. He was murdered by 21-year-old Frank Farris of Obion County.

== Biography ==
Case was born 1819 in the U.S. state of Ohio. He was one of seven children of Persis Seward (a cousin of eventual U.S. Secretary of State William H. Seward), and Dr. Gideon Case, originally of Connecticut, who moved to Hudson, Ohio, in a three-horse wagon about 1818. Case was married to Clarissa Pease in 1844 in Portage County, Ohio. With their boy Alden they moved to Obion County, Tennessee, in the late 1840s, and Case worked as a physician in the county seat of Troy, Tennessee before the American Civil War. According to the only substantial biography of Dr. Case, "By 1860 he had accumulated about $18,000 in real and personal property. Records indicate that he purchased 355 acres of land along Richland Creek, at a place some nine miles from Troy. He also purchased some slaves, owning a family unit of six, including four young children." The war came in 1861 and Case supported the United States. His teenage son Alden Case served in the Union Army, was captured with his regiment, and died as a prisoner of war at Andersonville Prison. Case himself served in the 7th Tennessee Cavalry Regiment (United States), organized by Isaac Roberts Hawkins.

Case was first targeted in December 1862, by "guerrillas who operated from the nearby swamplands surrounding Reelfoot Lake." Unionists had sought to organize a non-Rebel election of representatives to Congress from predominantly Confederate west Tennessee. After meetings in Trenton, Tennessee and Bolivar, Tennessee, a local meeting was organized at Troy by "local attorney William F. Bradford, who eventually raised the 14th Tennessee Cavalry (United States). Unionists approved a resolution offered by Bradford to elect congressmen and legislators as well as county officials. They also elected 20 delegates to the district convention at Trenton...That night guerrillas from the nearby riverbottoms kidnapped three of the delegates, including Bradford and Almon Case, a prosperous local physician and landowner originally from Ohio. Col. Thomas W. Harris of the 54th Illinois Infantry—the commander at Union City—considered the two men his 'main stand-by for [the past] five months.' When he threatened to burn Troy to the ground if Bradford and Case were not returned within five days, their captors summarily released them. For protection thereafter Troy unionists looked to bluecoats at Union City, hid in the swamps, or took refuge in Paducah, Kentucky." Generally speaking, "The majority of Obion's white males had voted for secession in 1861, and during the war the county was a haven for Rebel guerrillas. These whites did not like Senator Case, a wartime Unionist who firmly supported the Reconstruction administration of Governor William G. Brownlow."

After troops led by Nathan Bedford Forrest raided west Tennessee and captured the Union redoubts of Fort Pillow and Union City, Case probably fled the state, as Case and other West Tennessee refugees wrote to military governor of Tennessee Andrew Johnson "in the fall of 1864 that they were unable to return to their homes in Obion, Weakley, and Dyer counties for 'fear of assassination by roving Bands of guerillas and outlaws.'" In September 1864 he was a presidential elector for the Abraham Lincoln–Andrew Johnson National Union Party ticket. In January 1865 he was a delegate to the constitutional convention that drafted a new state constitution in anticipation of the conditional readmission of Tennessee to the union of states. Simultaneously he was put on the state ballot to represent the 22nd Tennessee senatorial district.

== Assassination ==
The body of the legislature was roundly mocked in the Confederate-sympathetic newspapers of Tennessee who also backhandedly listed them by name as potential targets for attack, phrased thusly: "Each one of these persons forfeits the right to be considered a citizen of Tennessee or an honest man. No honest man would cast such a vote; and no honest man can respect those who have cast it. We implore an outraged people to bear this fresh indignity with fortitude. If the individuals whose names are recorded above, dare to go home, let them go in peace. We would not harm a hair of their head. Their own infamy, and the scorn of their fellowmen, will be sufficient punishment." An attack on the Case family, possibly also perpetrated by Farris, killed Case's 16-year-old boy, Emmit Case, on September 24, 1866, as the Cases were coming home from church. Case himself was killed while returning from the Christmas recess to participate in a legislative session "which was predisposed to enact Negro suffrage." The assassination of Almon Case took place "at sundown on Friday, January 11, on the road near his home, shot from his horse close to the place where his son was killed some months earlier." Two Obion County deputy sheriffs were also shot during the spate of guerilla attacks that killed Dr. Case in January 1867. One of them, Moses H. Kinman, had also served in Hawkins' 7th and was horribly wounded by a gunshot wound through the face but survived at least in the immediate aftermath. The second, Roland Green, was a Union veteran killed the day after Case and Kinman were shot, on January 12, 1867.

The attacks were part of a larger guerrilla war in what is called the Tri-Counties (Obion County and Lake County, Tennessee, and Fulton County, Kentucky). This terroristic violence dated from the American Civil War if not earlier: "the men of the Tri-Counties resorted to violence so often during the war and in its aftermath that violence itself became a part of their value structure. Whether they operated as guerrillas, vigilantes, Klansmen, lynch mobs, or Night Riders, their tactics remained the same." According to Unionist testimony, Case "had served as a surgeon in a Tennessee Union regiment, was present at the Fort Pillow massacre, and had testified before a committee investigating the killing of black soldiers by the Confederates. The Whig charged that his murder was 'an invention to get the Senate below a quorum. By assassinating two more senators they can prevent the passage of any law at the present session'."

Benjamin Franklin "Frank" Farris (sometimes spelled Ferris) had reportedly killed a different Unionist (apparently this was Kinman), in broad daylight in the town square of Troy, Tennessee, a few hours before he killed Case, after riding into town alongside in a "seemingly friendly manner." Farris was born about 1846 as a son of Alpha Beasley, soon a widow, and Williford Farris. Farris was a veteran of Company K of the 2nd Tennessee Cavalry (Confederate), described as 5 ft 10 in (1.78 m) with dark hair, blue eyes, and a ruddy complexion. Republican-aligned papers compared his brother Oliver Farris, who led Company K, to the guerrilla Champ Ferguson. The Nashville Daily Press and Times, a Unionist outlet, claimed "was aided by several other guerrillas in the commission of the crimes, and undoubtedly had the connivance or acquiescence of the local people." The rebel papers claimed Case was killed because he had played in a role in the death of a third brother, John Farris, but Confederate John Farris was "wounded at the battle of Harrisburg, Mississippi in mid-July of 1864," when the "apparently mild-mannered" Case was not even in Tennessee, much less involved in combat in Mississippi. A bill that post-Confederate gunmen reportedly hoped to derail was a State Guard bill, promoted by Reconstruction Governor and ferocious Unionist and Democrat hater Parson Brownlow, to sustainably fund and arm a state militia force that could potentially disrupt their use of violence.

Harassment of the family continued even after the assassination of Case and "even visitors to their home were subject to ambush." His widow and surviving children eventually relocated to Graves County, Kentucky, to escape. Farris was never arrested or charged with any crime.

== Legacy ==
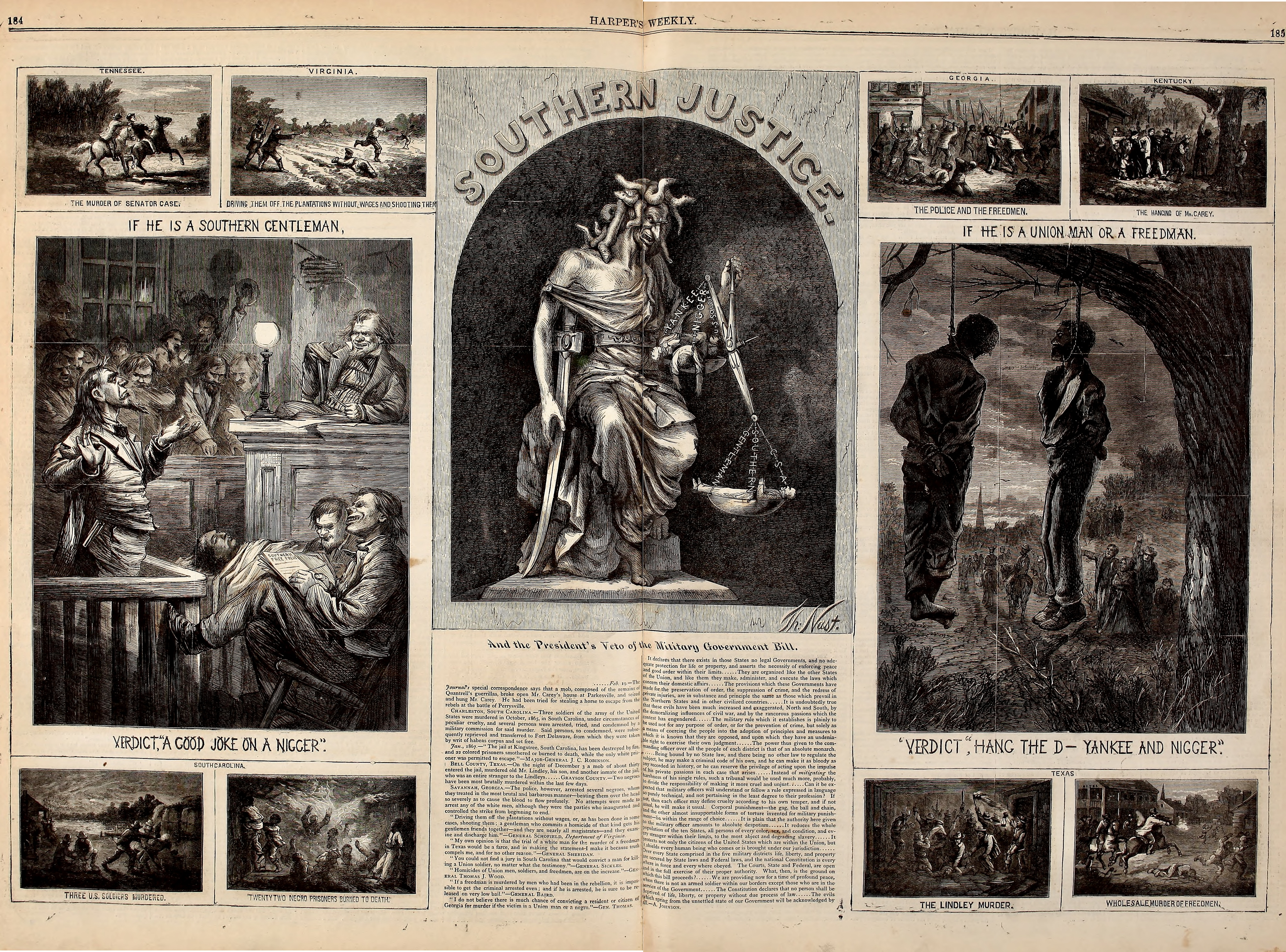
"Southern Justice" by Thomas Nast in Harper's Weekly (March 23, 1867)

In March 1867, New York-based artist Thomas Nast included an image of Farris riding down Case in his political cartoon Southern Justice, which represented "the brutal treatment of Negroes, Unionists, and Republicans by unregenerate Southern whites" and the Northern expectation that after the harvest of death that "the ideals fought for would be translated into reality" during the Reconstruction Era.

Case's murder was rapidly effaced from the historical record. A four-volume history of Tennessee published in 1932 claimed, citing a "highly partisan source," that he was killed "to avenge a brutal wartime murder." Almon Case's cause of death was not mentioned at all in his entry in the 1975 Biographical Directory of the Tennessee General Assembly.

== See also ==
- J. B. Blanding – U.S. soldier and murder victim (1841–1866)
- Jotham Horton – Baptist minister murdered by police (1826–1866)
- List of assassinated American politicians

== Sources ==
- Commemorative biographical record of the counties of Huron and Lorain, Ohio, containing biographical sketches of prominent and representative citizens, and of many of the early settled families. Chicago: J. H. Beers & Co. 1894. hdl:loc.gdc/scd0001.00145746796. LCCN rc01002195. OCLC 2272900. OL 15822421W.
- Baggett, James A. (2009). Homegrown Yankees: Tennessee's Union Cavalry in the Civil War. Baton Rouge: Louisiana State University Press. ISBN 978-0-8071-3398-9. LCCN 2008041579. OCLC 539324371. Project MUSE book 16499.
- Brownlow, William Gannaway; Humphrey, Steve (2021) [1978]. "17. The Pains of Reconstruction". That Damned Brownlow: Being a Saucy and Malicious Description of Fighting Parson William Gannaway Brownlow (CC BY-NC-ND 4.0 license). Distributed by University of North Carolina Press (ebook ed.). Boone, North Carolina: Appalachian Consortium Press. doi:10.2307/j.ctt1xp3mm4.22. ISBN 978-1-4696-3824-9. JSTOR j.ctt1xp3mm4.
- Lufkin, Charles L. (1985). "A Forgotten Controversy: The Assassination of Senator Almon Case of Tennessee". West Tennessee Historical Society Papers. 39. Memphis, Tennessee: 37–50. ISSN 0361-6215. OCLC 1769643. – (WTHSP 1947–2015 Archive at Shelby County Registrar of Deeds)
- Meador, Melinda (2021). Strange Fruit: The Forgotten Lynchings of Northwest Tennessee and Southwestern Kentucky, 1869–1931 (History, master's thesis). Murray, Kentucky: Murray State University.
- Severance, Ben H. (2005). Tennessee's Radical Army: The State Guard and Its Role in Reconstruction, 1867–1869. Knoxville, Tennessee: University of Tennessee Press. ISBN 978-1-57233-362-8. LCCN 2004014889.
