= Kirkwood City Council shooting =

2008 mass shooting in Missouri, U.S.

Coordinates: 38°34′48″N 90°24′25″W

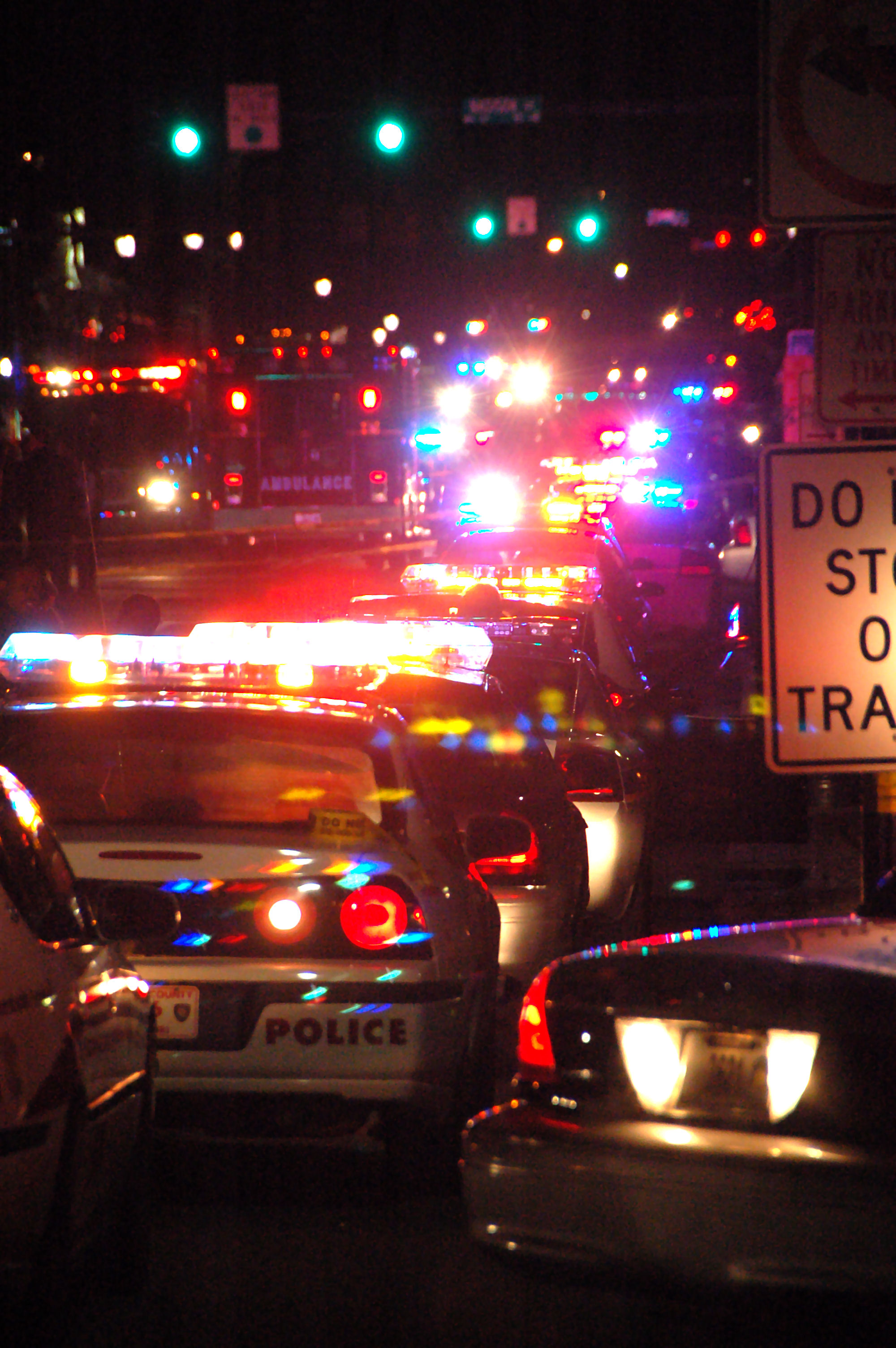
- Police responding to the shooting
- Location: Kirkwood City Hall; Kirkwood, Missouri, U.S.
- Date: February 7, 2008 c. 7:00 P.M. CST (UTC-6)
- Target: Kirkwood City Council
- Attack type: Assassination, mass shooting, mass murder
- Weapons: Smith & Wesson Model 29 .44 Magnum revolver, Smith & Wesson .40 caliber handgun (stolen)
- Deaths: 7 (including the perpetrator)
- Injuries: 1 (Todd Smith)
- Perpetrator: Charles Lee "Cookie" Thornton
- Motive: Not receiving construction contracts

On February 7, 2008, a mass shooting during a public meeting in Kirkwood City Hall left six people dead (Note: Five of the victims died on the day of the shooting and Mike Swoboda initially survived the shooting but later died in a hospice where he was receiving cancer care on September 6, 2008.) and another injured in Kirkwood, Missouri, United States, a suburb of St. Louis. Among the victims was the city's mayor, Mike Swoboda, who died from his injuries seven months later. Charles Lee "Cookie" Thornton, aged 52, shot one police officer with a revolver across the side street from city hall and took the officer's handgun before entering city hall. Thornton reached council chambers with these two pistols shortly after the meeting began. There, he shot a police officer, the public works director, two council members, the mayor, and a reporter. The shooter died from two gunshot wounds in a shootout with police.

== Shooting ==
Shooting victims
Killed
1. Tom Ballman, 37, police officer, killed
2. Kenneth Yost, 61, public works director, killed
3. Mike Swoboda, 69, mayor, originally critical; later released from hospital, but died seven months later in a hospice; he had also been battling cancer.
4. Michael H.T. Lynch, 63, council member, killed
5. Connie Karr, 51, council member, killed
6. William Biggs, 50, police sergeant, killed
Wounded
1. Todd Smith, 36, reporter

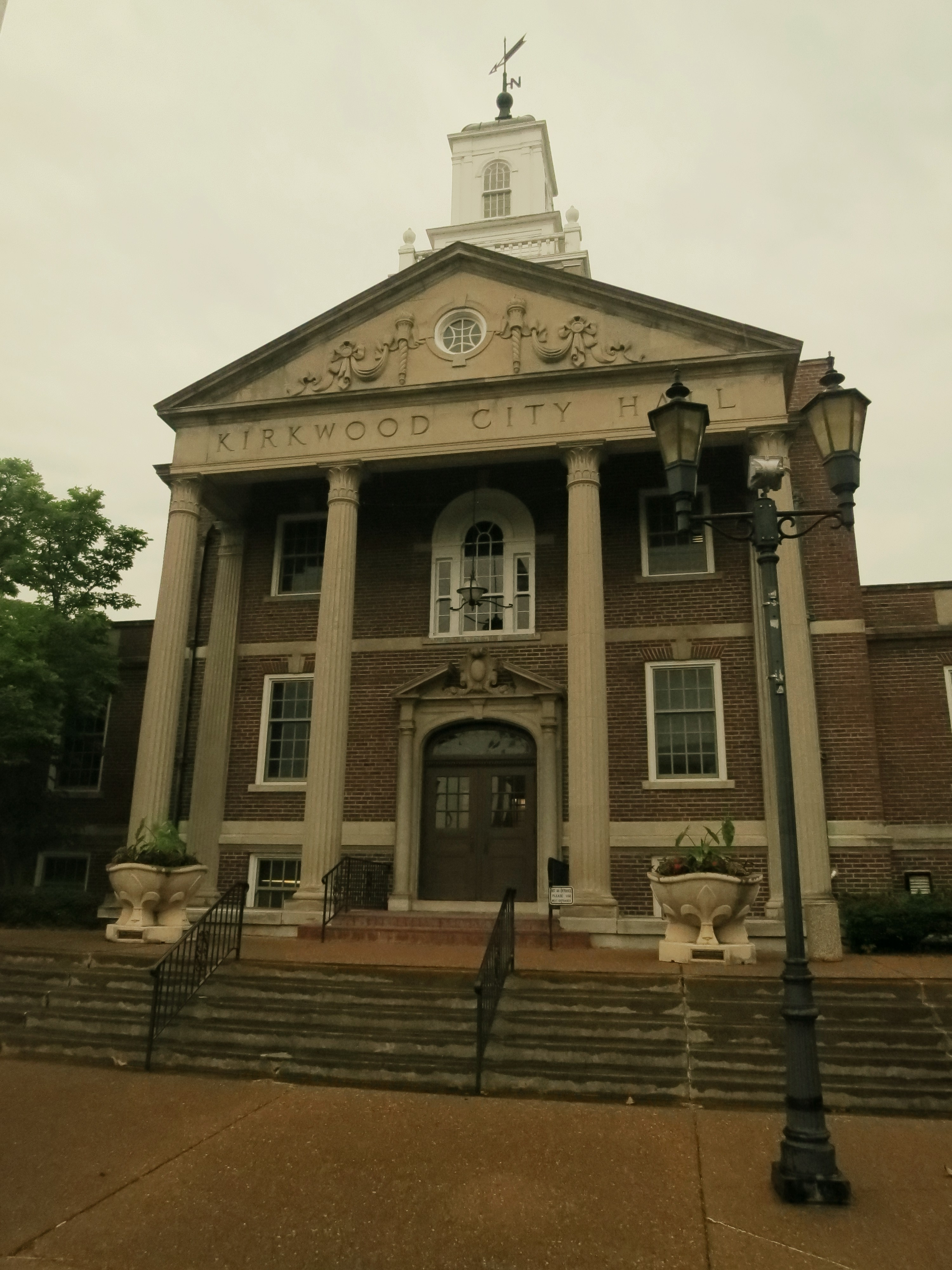
Kirkwood City Hall in 2013

Thornton parked his van on the side street near Kirkwood City Hall and saw Kirkwood Police Sgt. William Biggs, who was on duty but walking to pick up dinner nearby. In a parking lot across the side street from City Hall, Thornton confronted Biggs and shot him with a Smith & Wesson Model 29 .44 Magnum revolver, killing him instantly. Before Thornton fired, Biggs had hit a distress signal on his radio to summon additional police officers.

Thornton took Biggs' Smith & Wesson .40-caliber handgun and went inside City Hall. There, in the city council chambers, the Pledge of Allegiance had just been recited and the mayor was starting the city council meeting with 30 people attending. Thornton entered the room quietly from the back with both of his weapons concealed but soon got close to his intended victims. He first fatally shot Kirkwood Police Officer Tom Ballman in the head and continued shooting other victims at close range while reportedly repeating the phrase "Shoot the mayor!" He fatally shot council members Connie Karr and Michael H.T. Lynch, and Public Works Director Ken Yost. He shot Mayor Mike Swoboda twice in the head and left him for dead. Witnesses reported about 15 gunshots. Ignoring the four other council members, Thornton chased City Attorney John Hessel, who slowed Thornton by throwing chairs at him until escaping from the room.

All of this gunfire was audible at the Kirkwood police department building, located across a small parking lot from the rear entrance to city hall. Two Kirkwood police officers rushed to the council chambers. There, Thornton fired on them from behind a desk. The officers returned fire; Thornton, who still had rounds left, sustained two gunshot wounds to the neck and abdomen and died at the scene.

=== Aftermath ===
In total, Thornton killed five people and wounded two, reporter Todd Smith and Mayor Swoboda, who were taken to St. John's Mercy Medical Center, the latter in critical condition. The mayor had been shot in the lower jaw, with the bullet exiting from his cheek, and was also shot in the back of his head. He underwent surgery on February 7 and again on February 8, the latter surgery lasting three hours. Mayor Swoboda's condition was upgraded after a few days to "serious", and after two weeks to "satisfactory". Since then, he had begun eating soft food and talking. His family said that he had no memory of the shootings. He would need reconstructive surgery for his face; other long-term health effects were unknown.

On April 18, Swoboda returned to city hall to briefly address the last city council meeting before the expiration of his second and (due to term limits) final term as mayor. Seven months later, Swoboda died on September 6, 2008, in a hospice he had entered a week earlier. He had also been battling cancer.

A reporter for the local Suburban Journals, Todd Smith, was shot in the hand but released from the hospital within 24 hours.

== Perpetrator ==
=== Early background ===
Charles Lee "Cookie" Thornton (December 23, 1955 – February 7, 2008) was a lifelong resident of Meacham Park, an unincorporated predominantly African American community that bordered Kirkwood in St. Louis County, Missouri. In 1992, a ballot proposition appeared under which Kirkwood, an abutting, comparatively prosperous city with only a small percentage of African-American residents, would annex the low-income Meacham Park area. After spirited debate and campaigning, residents of both Meacham Park and Kirkwood approved the annexation. Upon annexation, the municipal codes of Kirkwood became the law for Meacham Park, which had previously lacked municipal codes due to its unincorporated status.

During the 1990s, Thornton was active in a number of civic and charitable organizations in Kirkwood. He ran for Kirkwood City Council in 1994, unsuccessfully.

Via eminent domain, part of the Meacham Park area was taken for a large commercial development in the late 1990s in a tax increment financing project. Thornton, who foresaw that his construction company would get contracts in this development, was a public proponent of it, in this respect opposing the views of some others in Meacham Park.

=== Legal and financial troubles ===
Thornton sought and received some work for his construction company during this commercial development. Family members and friends have said that he became resentful over having gotten less than he felt he had been promised. In 1999, Thornton filed a complaint with the Equal Employment Opportunity Commission alleging racial discrimination in the awarding of contracts he had wanted.

Marge Schramm, who was mayor at the time the contracts were bid, has said that contracts were awarded by the developers, not the city, and that the city had not promised contracts to Thornton.

In 1996, Thornton had begun receiving citations from Kirkwood for violations of city codes. In June 1998, he pleaded guilty to six violations; and agreed to a five-phase plan to bring his property and his paving business into conformance with city codes within two years.

However, this plan was not fulfilled, and Thornton began to leave new tickets unpaid. By late 2001, Thornton had been cited many dozens more times by Kirkwood officials under municipal code enforcement actions for operating an unlicensed business from his home in a residentially-zoned incorporated area; illegal dumping; destruction of property; parking his construction company's equipment near his home; and for numerous other municipal code violations. Kirkwood said in a state court memorandum in 2003 that by May 2002, multiple trials in city and county courts had concluded with Thornton pleading guilty to, or being found guilty of, more than 100 of 114 charges. Charges were dropped, or Thornton was found not guilty, on at least a dozen other charges.

Thornton said later in federal court, and at Kirkwood city council meetings, that he had received more than 150 tickets. Courts ordered that he pay nearly $20,000 in fines and court costs.

Thornton filed for bankruptcy in December 1999. During the bankruptcy process, he was put on a plan to get out of debt: he would pay $4,425 a month for five years. Thornton stopped making the payments within four months, and moved the portion of his business that had for a while occupied a rental property in a nearby commercially zoned area, back into his residentially zoned neighborhood.

Thornton never paid any of the fines from the Kirkwood code violation cases concluded in 2001 and 2002. Instead, he appeared regularly at city council meetings complaining of persecution, fraud and coverup by city officials. In 2003, he had signs on the side of his van, in which he vowed he would never again "accept lies from the city of Kirkwood".

Thornton repeatedly sued the city and Kirkwood public works director Ken Yost in state court unsuccessfully during a period of several years in the early 2000s. From around 2004 onward, Thornton, despite having no education, training or experience in the practice of law, acted as his own attorney. In 2005, the Missouri Court of Appeals opinion dismissing his suit against Kirkwood and Ken Yost for malicious prosecution and civil rights violations termed his brief "largely incomprehensible". After several years of the lawsuits, he declined an offer from the city to let his fines remain unpaid in exchange for dropping his last lawsuit against the city and no longer disrupting council meetings.

=== Previous incidents ===
On May 13, 2002, Thornton was convicted of assault on Ken Yost, who later became one of the murder victims. He was also arrested and handcuffed at two city council meetings in 2006. The first occasion was May 18, 2006. Thornton was charged with disorderly conduct and was released.

On June 1, 2006, the council considered resolutions to ban Thornton from attending or speaking at meetings. However, both were defeated; Kirkwood mayor Mike Swoboda stated then that, "We will act with integrity and continue to deal with him at these council proceedings. However we will not allow Mr. Thornton, or any other person, to disrupt these proceedings."

On June 24, 2007, Thornton was charged with misdemeanor assault after a struggle outside PJ's Restaurant in Kirkwood. Thornton had been picketing outside the restaurant and began stomping the owner until subdued by bystanders. The criminal case was pending.

=== 2007 lawsuit ===
On January 18, 2007, Thornton sued the city in federal court for $350. On March 15, 2007, Thornton entered a motion with the court with the purpose of amending the January 18 suit in several ways, including adding a claim for $14 million in damages. On June 21, 2007, a federal judge denied the motion to amend the original federal lawsuit. Thereafter, only the remaining (original) suit, which sought but $350 in damages, was in contention. Yet as late as February 1, 2008 — more than six months after the attempt to amend for an increased claim of damages had lost, and three days after the entire remaining suit had been dismissed—Thornton continued to tell friends of his hopes of winning millions from the suit.

A federal judge in St. Louis, Missouri ruled on January 28, 2008, on the lawsuit by Thornton in which he claimed his free speech rights were violated by Kirkwood officials preventing him from speaking at meetings. The judge dismissed his claims, citing his convictions for disorderly conduct at the 2006 meetings because "Thornton does not have a First Amendment right to engage in irrelevant debate and to voice repetitive, personal, virulent attacks against Kirkwood and its city officials during the comment portion of a city council public hearing, his claim fails as a matter of law." Included among documents from Thornton's federal lawsuit are court filings, evidence, judgments, etc. from several of the city, county and state court cases, both criminal and civil, in which Thornton had been a plaintiff or a defendant.

Witnesses, relatives, and acquaintances of Thornton reported that his motive for the shooting spree was anger about not receiving construction contracts he believed he was promised, his parking tickets, disputes with local government, and finally the dismissal of his federal lawsuit.

== Reaction ==
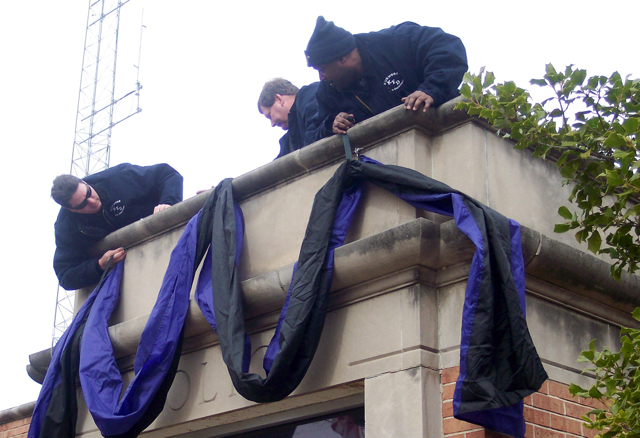
Firefighters laying bunting above the Kirkwood Police Department entrance as a memorial on February 8

Gerald Thornton, one of Charles Thornton's brothers, told CNN that his brother Charles thought his "constitutional protections" were violated and that his act was the only option. In other interviews he said that "my brother went to war tonight with the government," that he could not resolve his problems through communication, and that "this was not a random rampage." Gerald Thornton himself served five years in Missouri prison for fatally stabbing a man in 1996.

Charles Thornton left a one-line note on his bed, saying: "The truth will come out in the end" or "The truth will win out in the end." The note was considered to be a suicide note, indicating that Thornton may have intended to die in the shooting. Another brother, Arthur Thornton, said his family was "truly, truly sorry" for the shootings.

The Meacham Park Neighborhood Association (MPNA) met the afternoon of February 8. In attendance were 100 people, including Thornton's mother, and a "procession of ministers" who spoke at the meeting. Many there spoke sympathetically of Thornton. Elder Harry Jones of Men and Women of Faith Ministries said "This is something that took place over time, and perhaps it could have been avoided. There always has been a great divide between Kirkwood and Meacham Park." Thornton's mother spoke last, saying "We've got to do things the Bible way. I'm sad that this happened." A blog entry that same day from a minister who used to live and work in Kirkwood provides some background about the relationship between Meacham Park and Kirkwood:

The town of Kirkwood mourned on February 8, with flags at half-staff, and with prayer services and vigils being held throughout the day. A vigil was held across the street from city hall, with black fabric held over the entrance of it and a memorial of flowers, at 7 P.M. local time, about 24 hours after the shooting. Notes were left with the flowers, some addressing the deceased. Outside of the Kirkwood police department building various flowers and an American flag were laid in memoriam of the two officers killed during the shooting.

In 2014, a one-hour animated documentary, "Elegy to Connie", was released, which focused on Thornton and the racial tensions in Kirkwood while memorializing Connie Karr, one of the council members killed in the shooting. The director, artist Sarah Paulsen, stated, "It [the film] came out of the desire to talk about the event, about somebody who was lost in it, and how that impacted the community, and what happened to the community afterward."

== See also ==
- Ross Township Municipal Building shooting
- ABB plant shooting, occurred in a neighboring community
- Carl Drega, a man who attacked public officials
- James E. Davis, a New York City councilman, was assassinated in New York's City Hall
- Mount Pleasant, Iowa, where a shooting of officials took place
- Panama City school board shootings
- List of rampage killers in the United States
