= Mike Swoboda =

American politician

Mayor of Kirkwood, Missouri
- In office 2000–2008
- Preceded by: Marge Schramm
- Succeeded by: Art McDonnell

Personal details
- Born: Michael Emil Swoboda; September 29, 1938
- Died: September 6, 2008 (aged 69)

Michael Emil Swoboda (September 29, 1938 – September 6, 2008) was the mayor of Kirkwood, Missouri for two terms, from 2000–2008.

He was wounded on February 7, 2008, when Charles "Cookie" Thornton went on a shooting rampage at a meeting in the city hall. Swoboda, who was one of the targets of the rampage, was taken to St. John’s Mercy Medical Center in critical condition.

Swoboda was shot in the lower jaw, with the bullet exiting from his cheek, and was also shot in the back of his head. He received a surgery on February 7 and a second on February 8, which lasted three hours. On February 13, he opened his eyes, and on the 15th his condition was upgraded to serious. On February 23, his condition was upgraded to satisfactory. However, on September 6, 2008, Swoboda died in hospice after a rapid health decline shortly before his 70th birthday. According to Swoboda's son, a fall he took in early May and cancer were additional factors that contributed to his father's health decline.

== See also ==
- List of assassinated American politicians
