= William Pinckney Rose =

American soldier (1787–1850)

William Pinckney Rose (April 24, 1787 – January 22, 1850) was an American soldier.

== Life ==
Rose was born on April 24, 1787 in Granville County, North Carolina, the son of Frederick and Mary (Washington) Rose. During the War of 1812, he led a group of militia in Louisiana to enlist under Andrew Jackson. He participated in the Battle of New Orleans.

On January 16, 1817, Rose married widow Mary Vardaman Smith of St. Tammany Parish, Louisiana before moving to Copiah County, Mississippi. Rose was participant in the Constitutional Convention of 1832. In 1839 he moved to Harrison County, Texas, where he became one of the Regulators.

Rose died on January 22, 1850.
