= James Balbirnie =

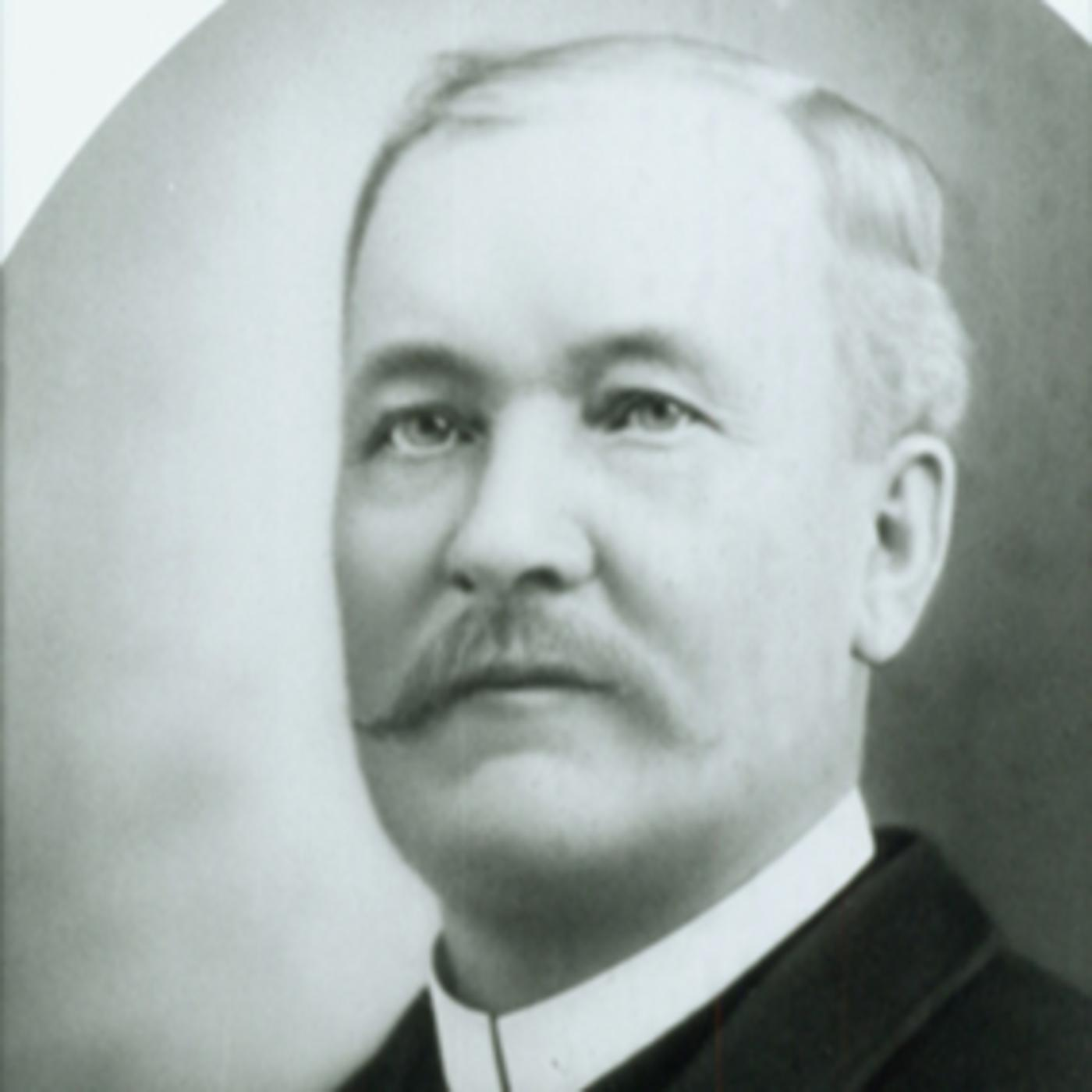

Mayor of Muskegon, Michigan
- In office 1898 – June 29, 1899
- Preceded by: Ansel F. Temple
- Succeeded by: Frank Alberts

Personal details
- Born: April 28, 1838 Quebec, Canada
- Died: June 29, 1899 (aged 61) Muskegon, Michigan, U.S.
- Party: Republican
- Occupation: Merchant, business owner, politician

James Balbirnie was a Canadian American Republican politician and businessman who served as mayor of Muskegon, Michigan, from 1898 to 1899 before getting assassinated in his own store.

== Life and career ==
=== Early years ===
James Balbirnie was born on April 28, 1838, at an old fort in Quebec, Canada. He was the eldest son of Canadians James and Jane Linch Balbrinie. He attented public schools in Ottawa, Canada. His first job was hotel-keeping for several years, the same as his fathers. He then joined the military band and at the expiration of his term as band leader in the army, he moved to Ottawa and organized the band there. Balbirnie was a dancing master for many years as well. In 1861, he married New Yorker Miss Ellen Watson (not to be confused with rancher Ellen Watson), and had three kids, Missie, James F., and Maud E. Balbirnie. On September 25, 1865, he moved to Muskegon, Michigan, with his baby son. Missie died young in 1883. Balbirnie's own mother died two years later, while his father died earlier in 1866.

=== Work and politics ===
Balbirnie was a carpenter who specialized in making cabinets, and he superintended several factories in Muskegon. He had a large business making coffins and furniture, and his businesses suffered three fires.

Balbirnie was part of the republican party in town and held a high position in the town's political affairs and was the county coroner of Muskegon County, a member of the Board there, and city supervisor in 1892. In 1893, he was a candidate for mayor, but withdrew in favor of John Torrent, who was elected later that year. In 1898, Balbirnie decided to run for mayor. In the republican convention held in March 1898, he was declared the unanimous choice for the Republican candidate for mayor. He won the mayoral election after defeating his Democrat opponent L. C. Gunn, serving a complete one-year term thereafter. He was renominated in March 1899, and then won the election the following month for a second term. Balbirnie won by 837 votes, described as a majority; the The Muskegon Chronicle noted that many democrats had voted for him, splitting their tickets.

== Assassination and aftermath ==
On June 29, 1899, Balbiernie was standing in his store's doorway and was approached by John W. Tayer, who handed Balbiernie a letter. While the carrier was present, Tayer shot Balbiernie; the bullet hit Balbiernie in the left breast. Tayer then stood in the same doorway where he shot Balbiernie and Tayer swallowed carbolic acid, and shot himself, and he was pronounced dead at 1 PM. Balbiernie staggered to his feet and rushed back into his residence and went upstairs, which was above the store. A blacksmith named William witnessed the shooting, and he ran after the mayor and reached the top as Balbiernie collapsed, and 15 minutes later, Balbiernie was pronounced dead.

The same day, reports attributed the assassination to Tayer's dissatisfaction after he was not reappointed to his former position as the city's poor director.

After his death, Balbirnie's son James F. Balbirnie took over as the administrator of his estate in the morning of August 3. Balbirnie was interred at Evergreen Cemetery in Muskegon.
