= Richard Burke (Alabama politician) =

Alabama state representative

Richard Burke (c. 1807 - 1870) was a Baptist preacher, an educator, and a state representative in Alabama. He was involved in the Union League. A few nights after a political meeting of African Americans, he was murdered. In Sumter County numerous African American Union League members were shot.

Burke was born in Virginia. Burke established a school for African Americans in Sumter County, Alabama and represented the county in the Alabama House of Representatives in 1869 and 1870.

Turner Reavis owned Burke when he was enslaved and testified during hearing in the U.S. Congress investigating activities of the Ku Klux Klan about Burke's activities at the political meeting and about his murder.

== See also ==
- African American officeholders from the end of the Civil War until before 1900
