= Franklin Sinclair =

American politician

Franklin Sinclair (unknown – April 16, 1868) was an African American teacher and political activist in Ouachita Parish, Louisiana. He was assassinated the day before an election in which he was the Republican nominee for a seat in the Louisiana House of Representatives, of which he would have been one of the first Black members.

== Political career ==
Sinclair (who is also identified in some sources as Franklin St. Clair) was a Massachusetts native and graduate of Oberlin College who, like many other educated African Americans in the north, headed south after the war to help the formerly enslaved population. He opened a school and became the only teacher of African American children in the parish.

In 1867, he was named a commissioner of elections in Ouachita Parish. In March 1868, he was nominated by Republicans for the position of county coroner, but in the weeks that followed, he was nominated instead for the state legislature.

The election was scheduled for April 17 and 18; he would have been a heavy favorite, given that more than two-thirds of Ouachita's population was African American. In the days leading up to it, Sinclair campaigned alongside other Republican candidates, both white and African American. "I am for the rights of all without the violation of the rights of any," he said at a rally. "The Republican party, known by the term radical, which means going to the bottom of things, is the party that every loyal citizen should co-operate with, because that party, and that party alone, is earnestly working to restore the State to the Union on the Congressional plan of reconstruction."

== Murder and aftermath ==
On the morning of April 16, the day before the election, Sinclair rode a horse back to Ouachita after a rally in neighboring Morehouse Parish the night before. Along the way, on a road near Linn Grove, a settlement near the contemporary town of Bonita, he was shot and killed by a man named James Payne. Payne was the white owner of a cotton plantation who had been working to elect Sinclair's Democratic opponent.

The Monroe Intelligencer described Sinclair after his murder as "one of the best-educated colored men in the community" who "had excellent qualities of head and heart and was a friend both to the whites and colored."

Local Democrats held a kangaroo court in which they "tried" Payne and declared him not guilty, declaring Sinclair a "riotous negro," but Payne was eventually arrested by a U.S. Marshal and charged with the murder. Federal officials said former Confederates ran Ouachita through "intimidation, fear, and dread...for which reason it is impossible to obtain justice for the said murder, or any other wrongs and cruelties inflicted by rebels upon colored and Union people in the parish aforesaid."

Payne did not dispute killing Sinclair, but claimed he was acting in self-defense. In testimony, a witness described multiple previous threats on Sinclair's life in Monroe, the Ouachita parish seat. Payne was released on $3,000 bond, after which he disappeared; a Congressional witness later testified that "I believe no attempt has been made to find him."

The man chosen to replace Sinclair as the Republican House nominee, former Union soldier O. H. Brewster, later testified before a Congressional committee: "Franklin Sinclair was very well considered by the southern people who knew him, and almost every white man of some standing with whom I had occasion to speak on that subject expressed me his regrets of this foul murder; they allowed that since they knew him they had not seen him out of his place once. The only offense southerners could find him guilty of, that I ever heard, was that he had been teaching school to negroes."

Brewster won the seat and later became speaker of the Louisiana House of representatives.
