= Reconstruction in South Carolina =

The Reconstruction era in the state of South Carolina after the American Civil War featured involvement of both scalawags and newly freed African American slaves. Land ownership was seen as an important aspect of freedom for African-Americans in South Carolina and the South Carolina Land Commission was created during the 1868 South Carolina Constitutional Convention. At the 1868 convention more than half of the 124 delegates were African-American. Beyond the African-American influence on the 1868 Constitution, there were also 180 black politicians in public office throughout South Carolina. A couple influential "scalawags" in South Carolina during reconstruction were Franklin J. Moses Jr. and Thomas J Coghlan.

South Carolina was a prominent area for the Ku Klux Klan during Reconstruction. The Klan engaged in political violence against Republicans and blacks.

== Land Commission ==
=== Sea Islands and William Sherman ===
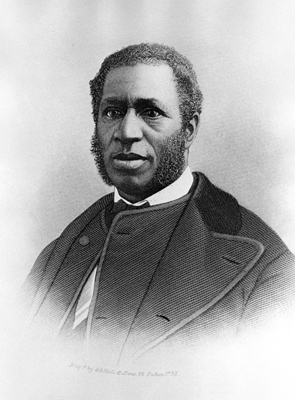
Richard H. Cain, African-American politician from South Carolina.

Initial experiments with African-American land ownership began during the Civil War with the Sea Islands off the coast of South Carolina. At the end of 1861, these islands were controlled by Federal soldiers. White landowners had abandoned their slaves and their land on these islands. The United States Department of the Treasury decided to allow the slaves of the Sea Islands to farm and cultivate the land in an experiment of citizenship and landownership. The Sea Island experiment did not in the end produce land ownership for the former slaves, due to complications with the way the Treasury Department ended up selling and distributing the land. However, in January 1865, Civil War general William Tecumseh Sherman issued Special Field Order No. 15 to provide land to the African Americans who followed in his wake. Field Order No. 15 seized all the Sea Islands, encompassing 485,000 acres of land to with the promise of their redistribution to the 40,000 African Americans in South Carolina. At the end of the Civil War, these new freedmen held only possessory titles to the land granted to them by General Sherman. President Andrew Johnson cancelled the possessory titles and granted the land back to southerners who paid the Direct Tax Commission and took an oath of allegiance.

=== South Carolina Land Commission ===
Land ownership for newly freed African-Americans became a central issue of the 1868 Constitutional Convention of South Carolina. Black delegate Richard H. Cain proposed petitioning the United States Congress for funds to purchase land for the freedmen of South Carolina. Cain's proposal was to request one million dollars, with the proceeds loaned, in turn, to African Americans for the purchase of land, subject to the obligation that the loan eventually be repaid. The proposal passed, with 101 of 124 delegates voting in favor. Senator Henry Wilson of Massachusetts advised, however, that Congress would not accept the petition. In response, the convention decided to establish a state land commission to acquire lands for the freedmen. Though the program was intended to benefit both the poor whites and African Americans, its unpopularity with Democrats left African Americans as the main participants.

The South Carolina Land Commission was created on March 27, 1869. Specifics were put into place regarding the distribution of the land and the terms of the loan. The tracts of land distributed by the Land Commission were to be between 25 and 100 acres. The land was provided on loan to freedmen. The loan required only payment of land taxes, plus 6% interest on the principal, for the first three years. The freedmen would then have eight years to pay the loan, plus 6% interest, to receive the title to the land received from the commission. The South Carolina Land Commission was afflicted with mismanagement and corruption during its existence. Despite this, by 1876, an estimated 14,000 families/70,000 African Americans had received tracts of land distributed by the Land Commission. By 1890 the Land Commission was bankrupt and its remaining lands were distributed to white southerners.

== African American influence ==
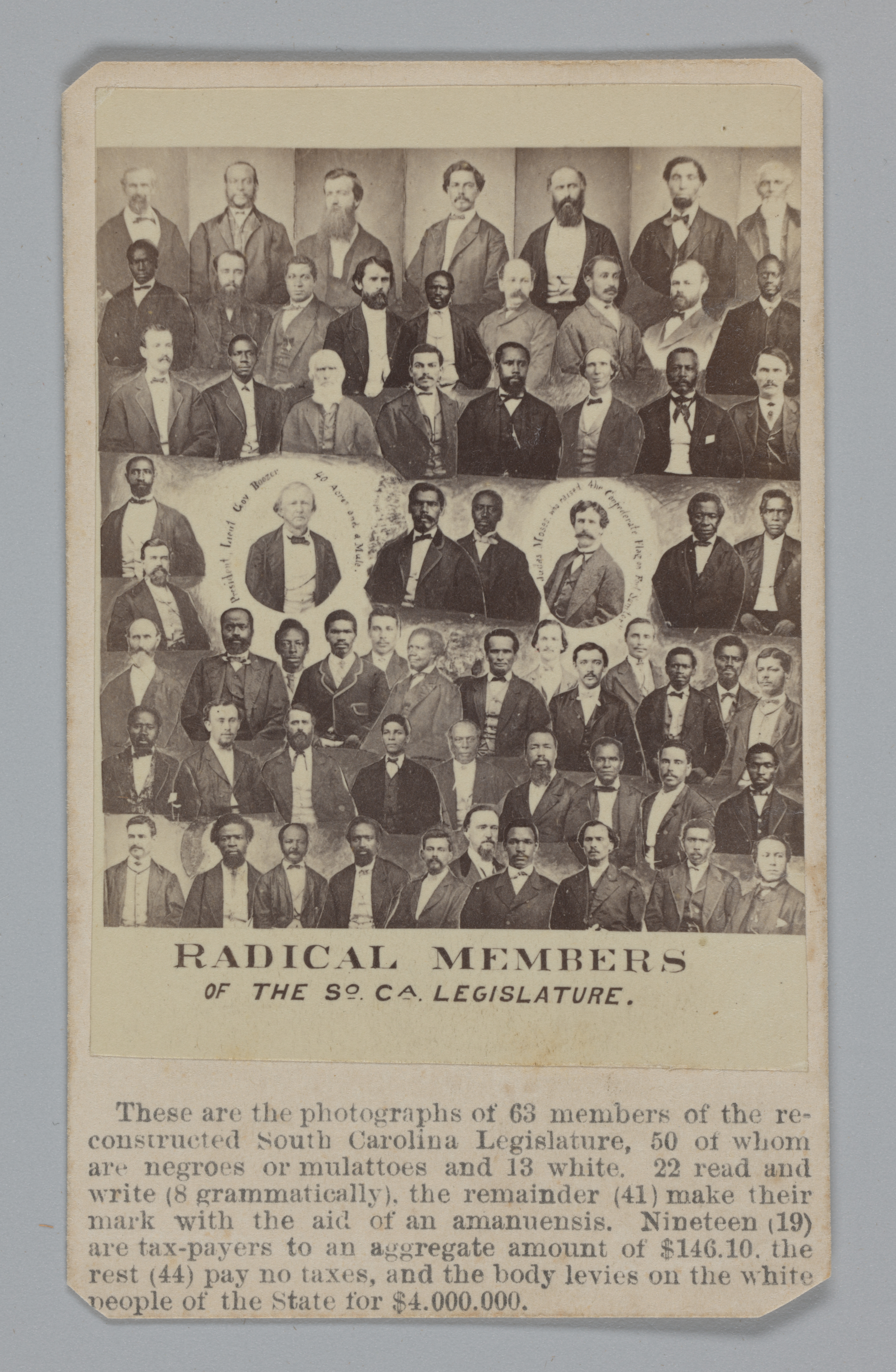
Many of the African-American contributors to the 1868 South Carolina Constitution during Reconstruction

Freedmen played a significant role in South Carolina society during Reconstruction. Many served in government, political positions, law, and journalism. However, many historians and journalists from Reconstruction through the mid 20th century often mischaracterized government operation in South Carolina as a consequence of African American participation. For example, Northern republican journalist James Shepherd Pike believed that involvement of the Klan would be helpful against the "ignorant" leadership of African Americans. The Democratic party would also move to disdain and demilitarize African Americans in government.

=== 1868 Constitutional Convention ===
The 1865 South Carolina constitution created after the Civil War did not provide newly freed African-Americans suffrage. This was in conflict with the Reconstruction Act of 1867 and led South Carolina to need a new constitution. At the 1868 South Carolina constitutional convention, among the 124 delegates present, 76 of them were African American. The African American delegates were influential in the construction of the new constitution for South Carolina.

Black delegates Francis Lewis Cardozo and Robert B. Elliott advocated the removal of a literacy test that they believed would discourage African Americans from voting. Of the 124 delegates, 107 voted to remove the literacy requirement.

The issue of women's suffrage was debated at this convention as well. Among the foremost of those advocating for women's right to vote was black delegate William J Whipper. His position was that if women were affected by the laws of the state, they should then have a vote to influence those laws. Women's suffrage did not pass at this convention.

Another proposal brought before the convention was to make public schools in South Carolina open to all races. There was concern from the white delegates, specifically B. O. Duncan, who worried that this would lead to racial integration of all schools. When the vote was placed for opening public schools to all races it was passed with almost 81% of the total delegate vote, including 64.71% from the white delegates. The passage of this school proposal provided the right for a child of any race to attend any public school, but it didn't require racial integration or prohibit racial segregation.

=== African-American women poom ===
New freedwomen fought against the obligation of field labor. Many freedwomen in South Carolina refused to labor in the fields as they had formerly done as slaves. These freedwomen wanted to turn their efforts and labor from the fields to a more domestic setting and work in the home. African-American women who worked in homes had to establish themselves as paid employees and not former slaves. Freedwomen did this through focusing their efforts on their work tasks, not their employers' personal needs.

== Education ==
South Carolina's 1865 Constitutional Article 10, made public education free and accessible to all youths of the state. By 1875, enrollment had risen to where nearly half of both Black and white children were attending school. Higher education became a possibility for Black students as well with the introduction of the Common school system, which established integrated and tuition-free univiersities. Funding was made available not only to South Carolina's residents or to those attending an institution in the state but was also made available to from regions such as the Caribbean for students taking their studies to a state outside of South Carolina.

=== Politics ===
South Carolina had the most representation of African-Americans in politics during the reconstruction period. Of the 234 total Black politicians 110 (47%) of them lived in Charleston, South Carolina. Another 70 of the remaining 124 were spread throughout the rest of the state. The term black, used to describe skin color, was used very loosely, since the census did not give a completely accurate definition of who that included. Black was used to describe those who had darker-color skin but may not have been African-American and may have been free even before the Civil War. The 234 black politicians included both black men who were freed before the war and those who had been slaves. Black politicians were usually associated with the Republican party, however, it was not unknown for them to associate with the Democrats.

African-Americans and other colored politicians had a variety of reasons for entering politics. Life in the south for African Americans was not great and they sought a better life for themselves and their families. They were involved in politics to make change and obtain hope for themselves and others. One area that they were particularly concerned with was economics, due to their circumstances.

Although politics was a great way to make a difference in the community, it wasn't the only way that a majority of African American politicians were involved in making change. There was a wide range and diversity. Politicians often held multiple responsibilities in other areas of government, while others had a big influence in their churches.

== Scalawags ==
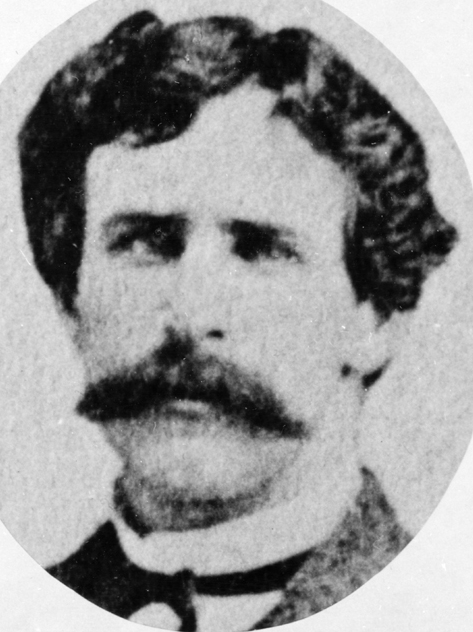
Franklin J. Moses was a scalawag with great political influence in South Carolina

Scalawags was a derogatory term applied to white southerners who were involved in, and contributed to, Reconstruction laws. Many white southern politicians became Republican scalawags due to the high influx of African-American voters after the Civil War. Appealing to the new freedmen was a priority for continued service in public office. An example of this is Alexander Stuart Wallace. He had previously been a slave owner and a popular Democrat prior to the Civil War. In 1866 he voted against black codes. Then in 1868, he joined the Republican party during the 1868 South Carolina Constitutional Convention. Democrats saw Wallace as someone who flip-flopped on issues to stay elected. At the same convention, white southerner Thomas J. Coghlan fought to establish a hate-speech law which would have prohibited racial slurs against African Americans. Prior to the Civil War, Coghlan had not been an ardent supporter of black rights.

=== Franklin J. Moses ===
Franklin Moses was involved in the community in many ways including politics. He was a newspaper editor, lawyer and church leader. However, religion was not of big importance to him. The newspaper he worked for had conservative views and ideas. When Moses began to have political views that differed from those of the newspaper, he was asked to leave. Moses set out to make a difference for those around him, specifically those of color, which led to his career in politics. Moses, a recent scalawag, ran for Speaker of the House and took office as he set out to help minorities. Moses made a huge difference with his efforts, however this did not come without mistakes and downfalls. Moses had a problem with money, which led to bankruptcy. After filing for bankruptcy he became involved in stealing and borrowing money he could not pay back.

== Ku Klux Klan ==
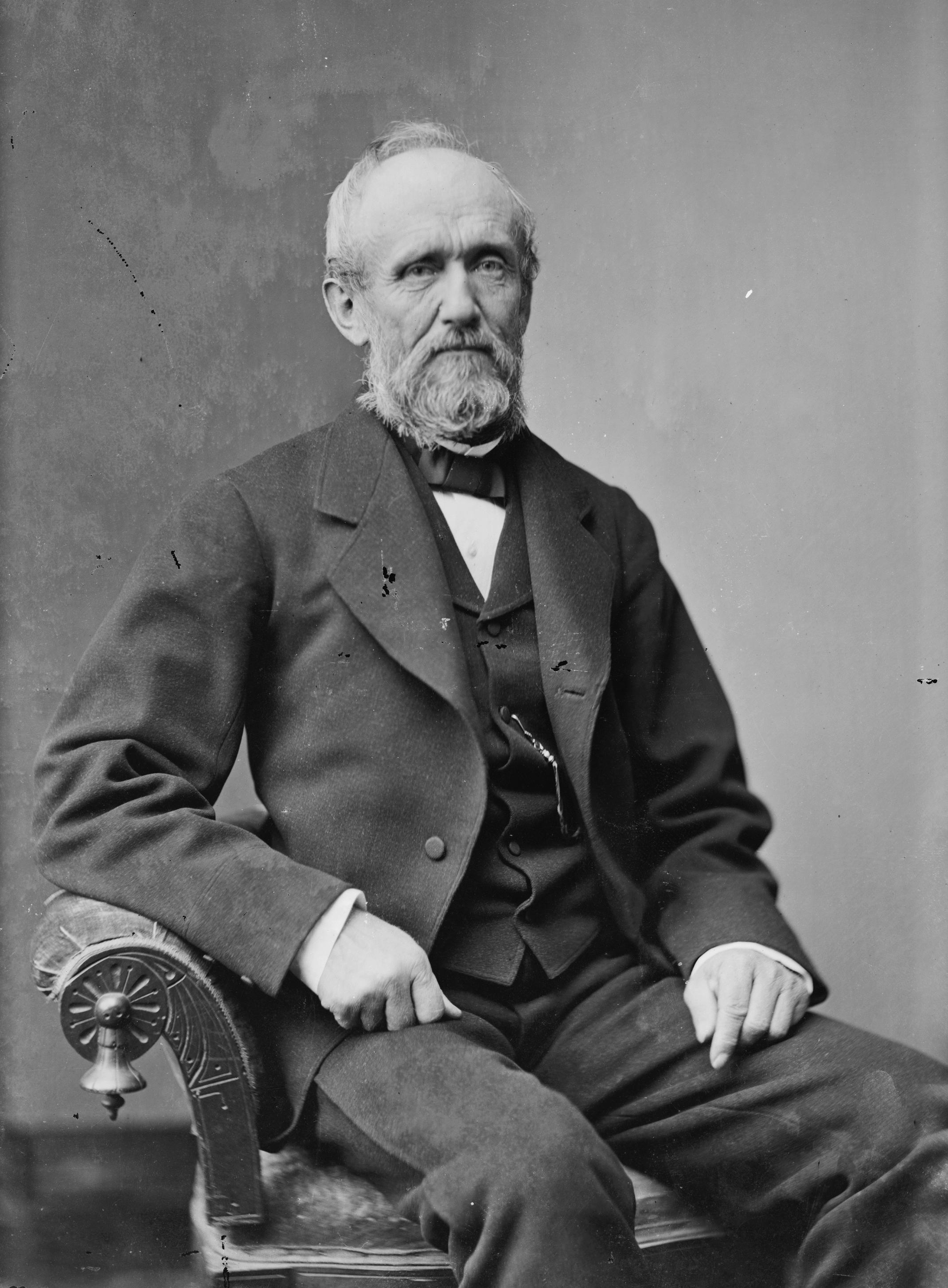
D. Wyatt Aiken ordered the assassination of Benjamin F. Randolph, an African-American in South Carolina.

The Ku Klux Klan (KKK) is believed to have come to South Carolina in 1868. At the behest of prior Confederate Civil War general and Tennessee Klan member, George W. Gordon, RJ Brunson was ordered to start a Klan chapter in South Carolina of 1868. The South Carolina Klan members were sworn to secrecy, by penalty of death, according to their constitution.

South Carolina was one of the more prominent states for the KKK post civil war. KKK members were motivated by politics and were associated very closely with the Democratic party. KKK members were known to come a good majority of the time from lower social class areas. They would often use force at the voting polls to prevent African-Americans from voting or to sway their vote. Democrats were worried about how African Americans would vote and sought white supremacy. South Carolina Klan members were ordered to report to their leadership of any meetings or gatherings of republicans or African Americans.

The KKK and other Democrats who owned real-estate caused great economic struggle for African Americans. They used motivation in which they would refuse to rent, refuse services, and even evict African-Americans, and other Republicans, if they would not vote Democratic. The KKK would even destroy ballots of those who voted Republican.

After anti-Klan legislation was introduced in 1871–1872, many other clubs were formed by white men. Some of these clubs were secret and not known to many people, and others were considered social clubs where friends would get together to shoot their guns. These clubs however had a history of violence towards blacks. Their goals were often the same as their predecessor the KKK: preventing blacks from having political involvement. With this hate towards African Americans, violence followed. A couple of black individuals were accused of a crime against a white woman. A group of blacks rallied together against their accusers, however, they were outnumbered 1,000 to 100. This was not the only case in which African Americans were accused and attacked by whites.

== See also ==
- Reconstruction Era
- Disputed government of South Carolina of 1876-77
- 1876 South Carolina gubernatorial election
- Bibliography of the Reconstruction era
