= Joseph Crews =

American politician

- Born: c. 1823
- Died: September 13, 1875
- Occupation: Member of the South Carolina House of Representatives

Joseph Crews (c. 1823 – September 13, 1875) was a Reconstruction militia leader who served as a member of the South Carolina House of Representatives from 1874 until his assassination in 1875. He was the state's highest-ranking military official in the 1870s and was put in charge of the state militia whose main purpose was to protect African-American voters. African-Americans were 58.9% of the population of South Carolina in 1870. He was reportedly murdered by Democrats in the run-up to the 1876 South Carolina gubernatorial election.

== Biography ==
Joseph Crews was a white businessman. In his trade he did business with African-American customers and partners. After the American Civil War, as racist attitudes hardened, he was referred to as a "Negro trader" and "accused of Union sympathies". According to Benjamin Ginsberg, he was a "highly visible scalawag" with support from the Federal occupying authorities. Crews served in the South Carolina 48th General Assembly in the South Carolina House of Representatives from 1868 to 1870 as a Republican. During the 1870 South Carolina gubernatorial election, he was a county election commissioner in Laurens County, South Carolina, and in that capacity had ordered all ballot boxes to be set up in the county seat. This disadvantaged rural voters, but enabled him and the state militia to oversee the election process and to protect black voters. Armed whites attacked the largely black militia and disarmed them; some were wounded, others murdered. "Like companies of Confederate cavalry", "heavily armed whites" pushed away black voters—until Federal troops came from twenty miles away, with Crews, and took control of the ballot boxes.

As Northern support for Reconstruction waned in 1871, Crews and similarly positioned public officials lost the support they needed to maintain order and protect blacks from southern whites determined to take back political control. For example, an 1872 congressional report written in what today would be considered shockingly racist language describes him as having distributed guns and ammunition to African-Americans; he was reported as "'Joe Crews', the great agitator of strife between the two races, who, in that very canvass [the 1870 elections], harangued the negroes from the stump, inciting them against the whites and their property".

He served in the South Carolina House of Representatives during the 51st South Carolina General Assembly from 1874 until his death in 1875.

== Assassination ==
According to a letter sent to President Ulysses S. Grant by L. Coss Carpenter, an Internal Revenue Service collector in South Carolina, Crews was shot by armed men three miles from the Laurens County courthouse on the morning of September 8, 1875. He was traveling in a buggy and was ambushed while crossing a creek. He was wounded by five pellets from a shotgun blast, one of the pellets piercing his spine and causing him to be paralyzed. He died at midnight September 13. According to Carpenter, he was the leading Republican politician in the county, and without him it would have been very difficult to prevent "ascendancy" of the area's Democratic Party. Crews was a "special deputy" for the IRS, but Carpenter felt assured that it was not his work for the IRS but his political activity that led to his murder.

George Washington Shell (later a U.S. Representative for South Carolina) and his son Walter Shell were arrested and charged with the murder. George Washington Shell's brother had been murdered in 1868, and in the weeks prior to Crews' murder, a man named Albert Parks confessed to that murder and implicated Joe Crews and others. G. W. and Walter Shell were acquitted of Crews' murder after a half hour of deliberation in June 1876. In August 1876, Francis McGann was arrested and confessed to taking $200 from Republicans Cullen Lark and John Hamilton for the murder. Lark and Hamilton were quickly released due to lack of evidence. The Laurensville Herald, edited by Thomas Crews, Joe's brother and a Democrat, wrote that there was "some trick in the matter. In the first place the prisoner [McGann] was allowed to 'escape.'" The News and Courier suspected that McGann's admission was a plot to convict Cullen Lark and cited as evidence that the Crews family was providing McGann's meals.

== Other accounts ==
Joe Crews is mentioned in one of the oral histories collected by the WPA Slave Narratives project, recorded from George Patterson in Spartanburg, South Carolina, in 1937: "He also stated that his father was a full-blooded Indian who was sold to his master by Joe Crews, the biggest slave trader in the country. His father was stolen somewhere in Mississippi, along with other Indians, and sold into slavery with the 'niggers,' He said his father told him he was stolen by Joe Crews when he was a young buck...You remember reading about Joe Crews and Jim Young—what they did in this state? Well, they tried to lead all the niggers after the war was over. I was the one who got Jim Young away from the whites. I carried him to Greenville, but he got back somehow,end was killed. Joe Crews was killed, too. The Ku Klux was after them hot, but I carried Jim Young away from them."

== See also ==
- Robert B. Elliott
