= Carl Drega =

American spree killer

- Born: January 19, 1935; New Haven, Connecticut, U.S.
- Died: August 19, 1997 (aged 62); Bloomfield, Vermont, U.S.
- Cause of death: Shot by police
- Motive: Long-term feud with government officials

Details
- Date: August 19, 1997
- Locations: Colebrook, New Hampshire, and Bloomfield, Vermont
- Targets: Law enforcement officers and Colebrook town officials
- Killed: 4
- Injured: 4
- Weapons: Colt AR-15; 9mm semi-automatic handgun

Carl Drega (January 19, 1935 – August 19, 1997) was an American spree killer who fatally shot four people on August 19, 1997, in what is known as the Colebrook shootings.

Drega had several long-term disputes with town and state government officials over his property in Columbia since the early 1980s. Drega shot and killed two New Hampshire state troopers, a judge and a newspaper editor in Colebrook. He also wounded four law enforcement officers before being shot and killed in a gunfight with police in Bloomfield, Vermont.

== Background ==
Carl Drega was born on January 19, 1935, in New Haven, Connecticut, to Polish immigrants. He claimed to have served in the U.S. military during the Korean War. Drega later worked in construction and lived in Manchester, New Hampshire, later moving into a home in Bow, New Hampshire, he built for himself and his wife Rita from 1969 to 1970. However, Rita was diagnosed with cancer the following year and died in 1972.

Drega had a long history of conflict with government officials over code enforcement issues, starting in the 1970s over whether he could use tar paper to side his vacation house in Columbia, New Hampshire, on the banks of the Connecticut River. He claimed that, in 1981, a rainstorm caused 80 feet (24 m) of the riverbank to collapse. Drega decided to dump and pack enough dirt to repair the erosion damage, saying this would restore his lot to its original size. State officials, on the other hand, contested that Drega was trying to change the course of the river. In 1995, the town selectman Vickie Bunnell accompanied a town tax assessor to Drega's property in a dispute over an assessment. Drega fired shots into the air to drive them away. Drega bought a Colt AR-15 rifle and armored vest, and began equipping his property with early-warning electronic noise and motion detectors.

== Shooting ==
On August 19, 1997, at about 2:30 p.m., New Hampshire state trooper Scott Phillips stopped Drega in the parking lot of LaPerle's IGA supermarket in neighboring Colebrook for having too much rust on his pickup truck. Drega got out of his truck with his rifle and fired upon Trooper Phillips, who was hit but returned fire before retreating into a nearby field. Drega followed Phillips into the field and murdered him.

Trooper Leslie Lord pulled into the LaPerle's parking lot moments later, and from approximately 150 feet (45 m) away, Drega shot and killed Lord before he could get out of his police car. Drega then stole Phillips' police car, and drove to the office of Colebrook District Court judge Vickie Bunnell. Bunnell reportedly carried a handgun in her purse out of fear of Drega, but may not have had it with her that day. Seeing Drega approaching the building with his rifle, she warned fellow staffers to evacuate as she ran for an exit. Drega shot Bunnell in the back from a range of about 30 feet (9.1 m), killing her. Dennis Joos, editor of the local Colebrook News and Sentinel, attempted to disarm Drega after Bunnell fell. During the struggle Drega shot and killed Joos.

Drega returned to his property and set his house on fire. New Hampshire Fish & Game Warden Wayne Saunders observed Drega driving the state police car. Drega turned and crossed the state line to Bloomfield, Vermont, exited the police car, and fired upon Saunders. Saunders was hit with several bullets through his vehicle in his arm and shoulder, including one that struck his badge, saving him from a likely fatal wound. Saunders retreated under the hail of fire by driving in reverse, and crashing into the Connecticut River.

Drega set up his last stand on a dead-end road on the Vermont side of the river. Police from numerous state, local and federal agencies descended upon Drega's position. Drega sprang his ambush, shooting NH state trooper Jeffrey Caulder in the lower abdomen, NH state trooper Robert Haase in the foot, and U.S. Border Patrol agent John Pfeifer in the chest.

After the gunfire died down, agents moved a police vehicle to the scene in an attempt to evacuate Pfeifer before he bled to death. But once the vehicle approached, Drega began firing again, forcing the officers to take cover. Eventually, NH state trooper Charles West and Border Patrol agent Stephen Brooks advanced up a slope to Drega's position. As Drega stepped out from behind a tree to fire, Brooks opened up with his M14 rifle while West fired a slug from his Remington 870 shotgun, killing Drega and ending the gunfight. Agent Pfeifer recovered from his wounds and went on to continue his career in the Border Patrol for more than 20 years.

== Memorials ==
U.S. Route 3 between Pittsburg and Colebrook is named the Trooper Leslie G. Lord Highway and from Colebrook to North Stratford the Trooper Scott E. Phillips Highway. The Vickie Bunnell Preserve surrounds Bunnell Mountain (formerly Blue Mountain) in Columbia. A memorial stone to the four murder victims was erected by the town of Colebrook near the News and Sentinel building. Below their names is the inscription, "Their Deeds Are Their Memorials".

== Sources ==
- Ayoob, Massad. "Bringing A Pistol To A Rifle Fight". American Handgunner. 25 (152). Archived from the original on January 4, 2009 – via FindArticles.
