= Jordan Carlisle Jackson Jr. =

American attorney, Black community leader (1848–1918)

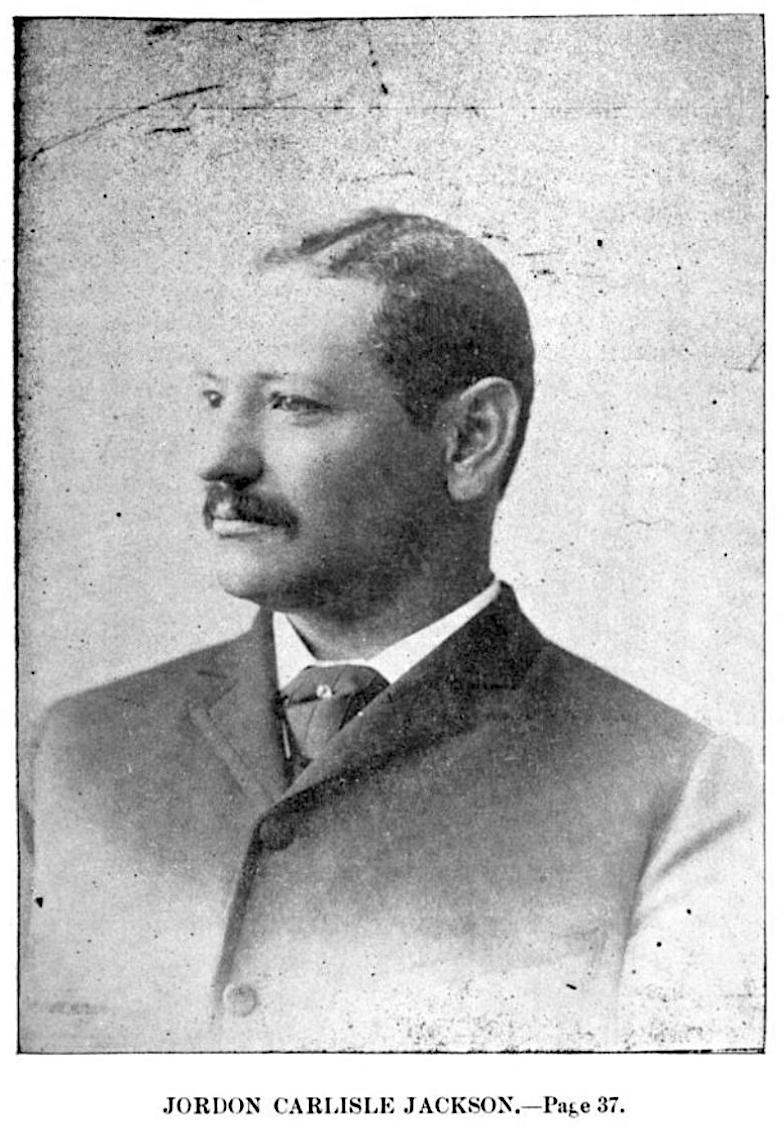
- Born: February 28, 1848; Lexington, Kentucky, U.S.
- Died: October 7, 1918 (aged 70); Lexington, Kentucky, U.S.
- Burial place: Cove Haven Cemetery, Lexington, Kentucky, U.S.
- Other names: Jordon Carlisle Jackson Jr., Jordan C. Jackson, Jordan Jackson, J. C. Jackson, Jordon Carlisle Jackson, Uncle Eph
- Occupations: Lawyer, funeral director, newspaper editor, Black community leader
- Political party: Republican
- Spouse: Eliza "Belle" Mitchell Jackson (m. 1871–1918; his death)

Jordan Carlisle Jackson Jr. (February 28, 1848 – October 7, 1918), also known as J. C. Jackson, was an American lawyer, funeral director, newspaper editor, and Black community leader. He was married to abolitionist Eliza "Belle" Mitchell Jackson. He was a member of the National Negro Business League. Jackson used the nom-de-plume "Uncle Eph".

== Early life and family ==
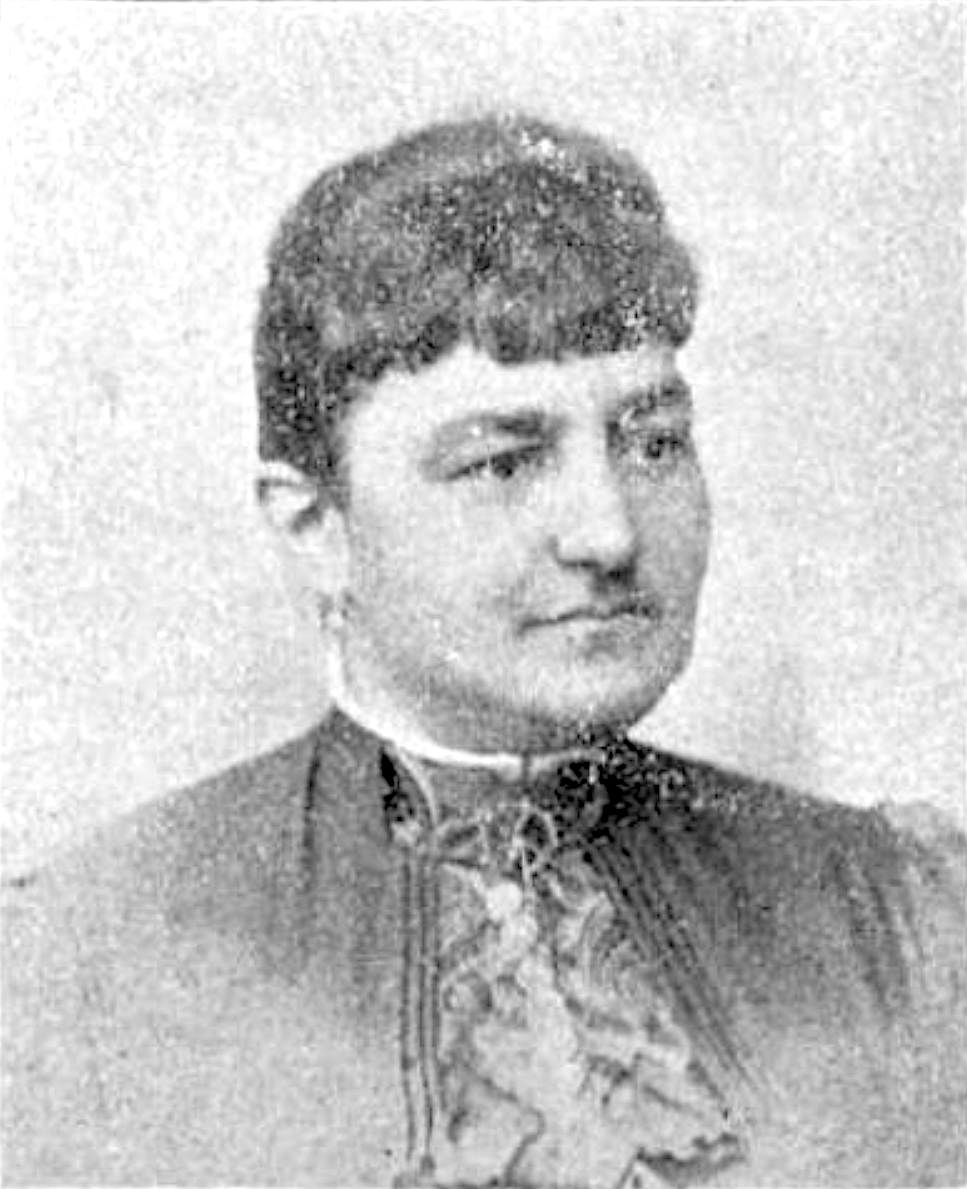
E. Belle Jackson, his wife

Jordon Carlisle Jackson Jr. was born enslaved on February 28, 1848, in Lexington, Kentucky, to parents Jane Ann (née Buckner) and Jordan Carlisle Jackson Sr. One of his brother was John Henry Jackson (1850–1919), a professor at Berea College and an academic administrator.

He was enslaved on a plantation owned by Lydia Graves and her family, located on Newtown Pike. In 1864 at the age of 16 years old, Jackson was freed. He worked as a shoe shiner, and took classes at night, splitting his wages with his parents. Jackson ended up returning to the Graves plantation for the next three years because he wasn't making enough money in shoe shining. He taught himself to read and write.

Jackson married abolitionist Eliza "Belle" Mitchell Jackson (1848–1942) in 1871. Together they adopted two children. He credited his wife for much of his career success.

== Career and community work ==
=== Newspaper publishing ===
Jackson worked as the publisher and editor of the American Citizen newspaper in Lexington. He later work at the Kentucky Republican, and as a contributing editor to the Lexington Standard.

=== Funeral and livery business ===
Jackson briefly owned a fruit and confection shop in Lexington, prior to entering the funeral business.

In 1892, Jackson became a partner of Porter and Jackson, a funeral and livery business located on 36 North Limestone Street in Lexington. His business partner William M. Porter was eventually bought out by Jackson.

Jackson was a founding member and the superintendent of the Greenwood Cemetery.

=== Republican politics ===
Jackson was active in Republican politics, and frequented Republican conventions to represent his Black community. He also worked as a collector at the Internal Revenue Service (IRS) in the 7th district of Kentucky.

He was a delegate-at-large with William Cassis Goodloe at the 1876 Republican National Convention held at the Exposition Hall in Cincinnati, Ohio. Jackson was a delegate-at-large at the 1892 Republican National Convention held at the Industrial Exposition Building in Minneapolis, Minnesota. He actively campaigned in 1896 for President William McKinley.

=== Black community leadership ===
Jackson served as the secretary of the 1875 National Negro Convention in Nashville. He attended the 1875 National Convention of Colored Newspaper Men in Cincinnati. He also attended the Colored Congress of Farmers and Businessman at the community of New Zion in Scott County, Kentucky.

In 1892, Jackson fought against the Separate Coach Law of 1891, a Jim Crow law requiring separate coaches on railway trains for White and Black passengers. Jackson was made a temporary chairman of the State Convention in Lexington, Kentucky, where he gave a moving speech on the Separate Coach Law.

He was a member of the National Negro Business League.

Jackson served as the chairman of the committee behind the creation of Douglass Park in Lexington.

=== Trustee and board work ===
Jackson was active on several boards including the Colored Fair board, and the Colored Orphan Home Board. He was a layman trustee for the Kentucky Conference, African Methodist Episcopal (AME) Church of Wilberforce University, Wilberforce, Ohio.

Jackson served for 12 years on the board of trustees for Berea College, as the only Black trustee. He was well liked by Berea College's President Henry Fairchild and Rev. John G. Fee.

== Death ==
He died on October 7, 1918, in Lexington, Kentucky. He was interred at Cove Haven Cemetery in Lexington.
