= E. Belle Jackson =

American educator, activist (1848–1942)

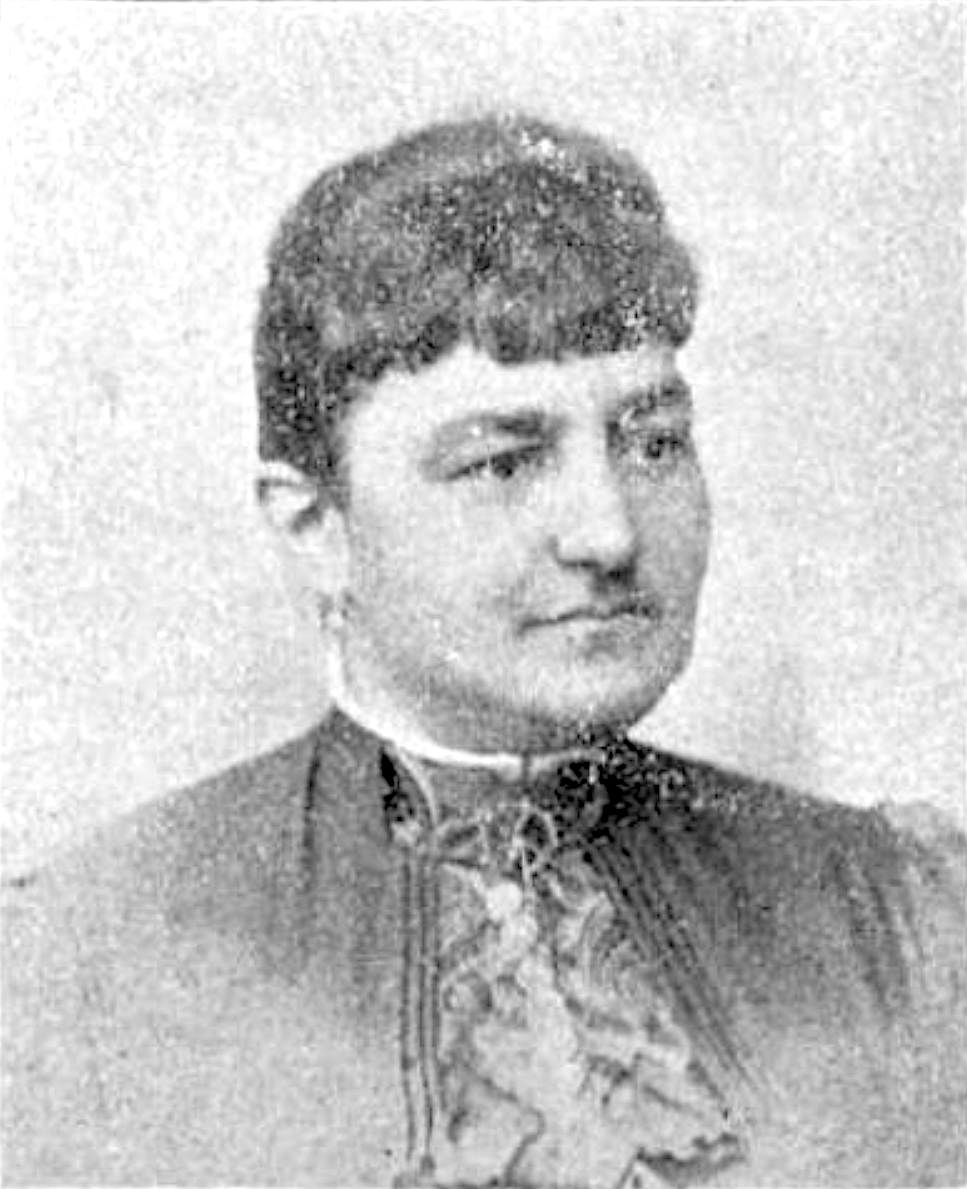
- Born: Eliza Isabelle Mitchell; December 31, 1848; Perryville, Kentucky, U.S.
- Died: October 6, 1942 (aged 93)
- Other names: Belle Mitchell, Belle Jackson, Eliza Isabelle Mitchell Jackson
- Education: Berea College (BA)
- Occupations: Educator, activist, small business owner, abolitionist
- Spouse: Jordan Carlisle Jackson Jr. (m. 1871–1918; his death)
- Children: 2

Eliza Isabelle Mitchell Jackson (née Eliza Isabelle Mitchell; December 31, 1848 – October 6, 1942) commonly known as E. Belle Jackson, was an American educator, activist, small business owner, and abolitionist from Kentucky. Jackson was one of the founders of the Colored Orphans Industrial Home in Lexington, Kentucky.

== Early life and education ==
Eliza Isabelle (Belle) Mitchell was born on December 31, 1848, in Perryville, Kentucky to Monroe and Mary Mitchell. Her father was a carpenter. Her parents were former slaves who bought their own freedom before her birth. Prior to her early teaching positions, she attended private school in Danville, Kentucky and Xenia, Ohio. Later, she completed her education at Berea College.

Jackson met Rev. John Gregg Fee, an American Missionary Association (AMA) minister and abolitionist, in fall 1865 at her church in Danville. Fee hired Jackson for her first teaching position as the first African American teacher at Camp Nelson.

== Educator ==
Though her employer, the American Missionary Association strongly advocated abolitionism, members’ view toward full equality differed substantially. Rev. Fee was a strong voice for full equality, a view not shared by the other teachers who were white. Thus, her hiring led to controversy.

Camp Nelson was first established in 1863 as a Union depot during the United States Civil War. By mid-1864, the site had become a major United States Colored Troops (USCT) facility, training 10,000 of Kentucky's 23,000 USCT. With the troops came others fleeing slavery, mostly their families, who were referred to as refugees, totaling over 3,000. The emancipation of enslaved males in Kentucky upon enlistment was authorized in June 1864, six months after President Abraham Lincoln's Emancipation Proclamation which was limited to the 11 rebellious states in the Confederate States of America. Kentucky was among the four slaveholding Union states.

By December 1864, the military authorized the construction of the Home for Colored Refugees which paved the way for the school, teachers’ quarters, a mess hall, and a dormitory Included were 16 by 16 foot duplex cottages for families, a mess hall, barracks, a school, teachers’ quarters and a dormitory. March 1865, a Congressional Act was passed that freed the wives and children of the U.S. Colored Troops.

When Jackson began teaching at Camp Nelson, enrolled at the school were 600 refugees, women and children who recently had obtained their freedom through the 1865 act. However, Mitchell's time at Camp Nelson was cut short. Military officers and ten of the 12 teachers refused to dine with her in the mess hall. Rev. Fee rejected the teachers’ protest. However, during his brief absence, the camp superintendent forced her to leave.

After leaving Camp Nelson, Jackson was immediately invited to teach at the Missionary Free School of Color. The school was opened by the black First Baptist Church of Lexington, Kentucky. The AMA paid the teacher, but the school struggled with both a serious lack of supplies school and a shortage of warm clothing which hampered winter attendance. By March 1870, Jackson had an enrollment of 95, mostly between the ages of six and 16. Despite the scarcities, Jackson stated she has “reasonable hope” that her students had made progress out of their “untutored state.” She also taught in Frankfort, Louisville, Nicholasville, and Richmond, Kentucky.

== Activism ==
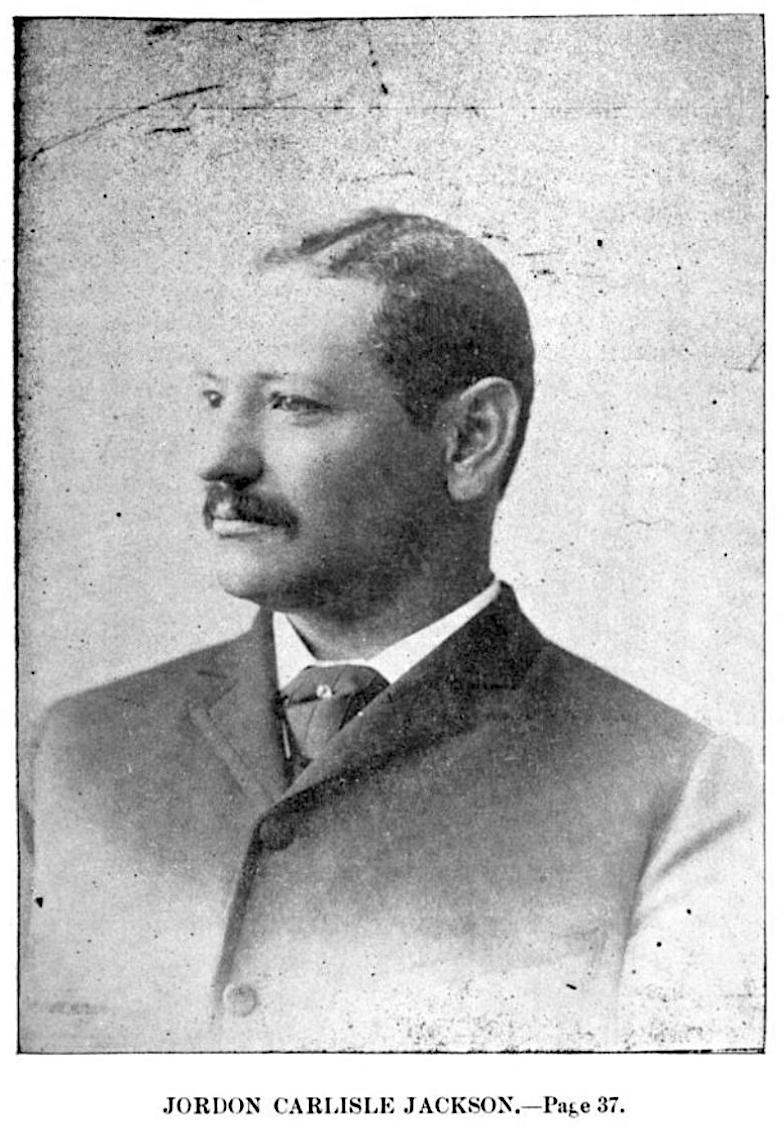
Jordan Carlisle Jackson Jr.

Jackson was a founder of the Colored Orphans Industrial Home in Lexington, Kentucky. One of the 15 local black women listed as the board of directors in the incorporation filed in September 1892, she was elected board president. Originally the institution was a home for elderly African American women without family to care for them. Eventually, the home became an orphanage and school for homeless African American children. The large brick home on two acres was on Georgetown Street.

== Business ==
In 1871, she married Jordan Carlisle Jackson Jr., a successful businessman in Lexington, Kentucky. Jackson was an undertaker and livery owner. After her marriage, she owned a millinery shop in Lexington, located at 9 South Mill Street. The couple adopted two children. The couple worked together on political efforts to advance the lives of the African-American community in Kentucky.

== Bibliography ==
- Benjamin, R.C.O. (1899). Negro Business Directory Fair Souvenir for Lexington, Kentucky. Lexington: Standard Printing Co.
- Byars, Lauretta Flynn (1996). "E. Belle Mitchell Jackson". In Smith, Jessie Carney (ed.). Notable Black American Women, Book II. Detroit, MI: Gale Research. pp. 317–20.
- Byars, Lauretta F. (Spring 1991). "Lexington's Colored Orphan Industrial Home, 1892-1913". Register of the Kentucky Historical Society. 89 (2): 147–178. JSTOR 23382430.
- Byars, Lauretta F. (1995). Lexington's Colored Orphan Industrial Home: Building for the Future. Lexington, KY: I.B. Bold Publications.
- Burnside, Jacqueline G. (Summer 1987). "Black Symbols: Extraordinary Achievements by Ordinary Women". Appalachian Heritage. 15 (3): 11–16. doi:10.1353/aph.1987.0071. S2CID 143644944.
- Dunnigan, Alice Allison (1982). The Fascinating Story of Black Kentuckians: Their Heritage and Traditions. Washington D.C.: Associated Publishers.
- Fee, John G. (1891). Autobiography of John G. Fee, Berea, Kentucky. Chicago, Ill.: National Christian Association.
- Hodge, Aleta (September 6, 2014). "The Jackson Family Legacy in Kentucky". Kentucky Ancestors.
- Mitchell, Myrtle Y. (March 1991). "Interview with Lauretta Flynn Byars". Louie B. Nunn Center for Oral History. University of Kentucky Libraries.
- "Robert H. Williams Children's Home Oral History Project". Louie B. Nunn Center for Oral History. University of Kentucky Libraries.
- Sears, Richard (2015). "Jackson, Eliza Isabel "Belle" (Mitchell)". In Smith, Gerald L.; McDaniel, Karen Cotton; Hardin, John A. (eds.). The Kentucky African American Encyclopedia. Lexington: University Press of Kentucky. p. 269.
