= Victor B. Howard =

Academic work
- Discipline: History
- Institutions: Morehead State University

Victor B. Howard was an American professor of history at Morehead State University and an author. He wrote books including Black Liberation in Kentucky: emancipation and freedom, 1862-1884; Religion and the Radical Republican Movement, 1860 - 1870; Conscience and Slavery, The Evangelical War Against Slavery; and Caste: The Life and Times of John G. Fee about John G. Fee.

He was photographed as part of the University Press of Kentucky’s first editorial board January 1, 1951 or 1969.

He was married to librarian and artist Wilma B. Howard who painted covered bridges.

The Victor Howard Collection is part of the Kentuckiana Digital Library.

== Books ==
- Religion and the Radical Republican Movement, 1860 - 1870 University Press of Kentucky (1990)
- Conscience and Slavery, The Evangelical War Against Slavery Kent State University Press (1990)
- The Evangelical War against Slavery and Caste: The Life and Times of John G. Fee Susquehanna University Press (1996)
- Black liberation in Kentucky : emancipation and freedom, 1862-1884 The University Press of Kentucky (2010)

== Articles ==
- The Slavery Controversy and a Seminary for the Northwest published in the December 1965 issue of the Journal of Presbyterian History, pages 227-253
- "The Illinois Republican Party" Summer 1971 issue of the Journal of the Illinois State Historical Society, pages 125-160
- The Southern Aid Society and the Slavery Controversy published in the June 1972 issue of Church History, pages 208-224
- The Kentucky Presbyterians in 1849: Slavery and the Kentucky Constitution published in the July 1975 issue of the Register of the Kentucky Historical Society, pages 217-240
