= Charles Young Park and Community Center =

Community center in Lexington, Kentucky, US

- U.S. National Register of Historic Places
- Interactive map of Charles Young Park and Community Center
- Location: Lexington, Kentucky, U.S.
- Coordinates: 38.04345°N 84.48396°W
- Area: 2.6 acres (1.1 ha)
- Built: 1930s
- Built by: Smith-Haggard Lumber Company
- Architect: John V. Moore
- Architectural style: Colonial Revival
- Website: www.lexingtonky.gov/playing/parks-natural-areas/charles-young-park
- NRHP reference No.: 15000413
- Added to NRHP: February 9, 2016

The Charles Young Park and Community Center is a park and community center complex located in the East End neighborhood of Lexington, Kentucky. The park land was purchased by the city of Lexington in 1930, and the community center opened in 1935. Under the Jim Crow system, Lexington parks were racially segregated in the early 20th century, and Charles Young Park was the second park in Lexington available to Black residents after Douglass Park. The park is named after distinguished United States Army officer Charles Young.

The park features a splash pad and outdoor basketball courts, and the community center hosts a variety of events for all ages. The park and community center were listed on the National Register of Historic Places in 2016, recognizing its contribution to the Black history of Lexington.

== History ==
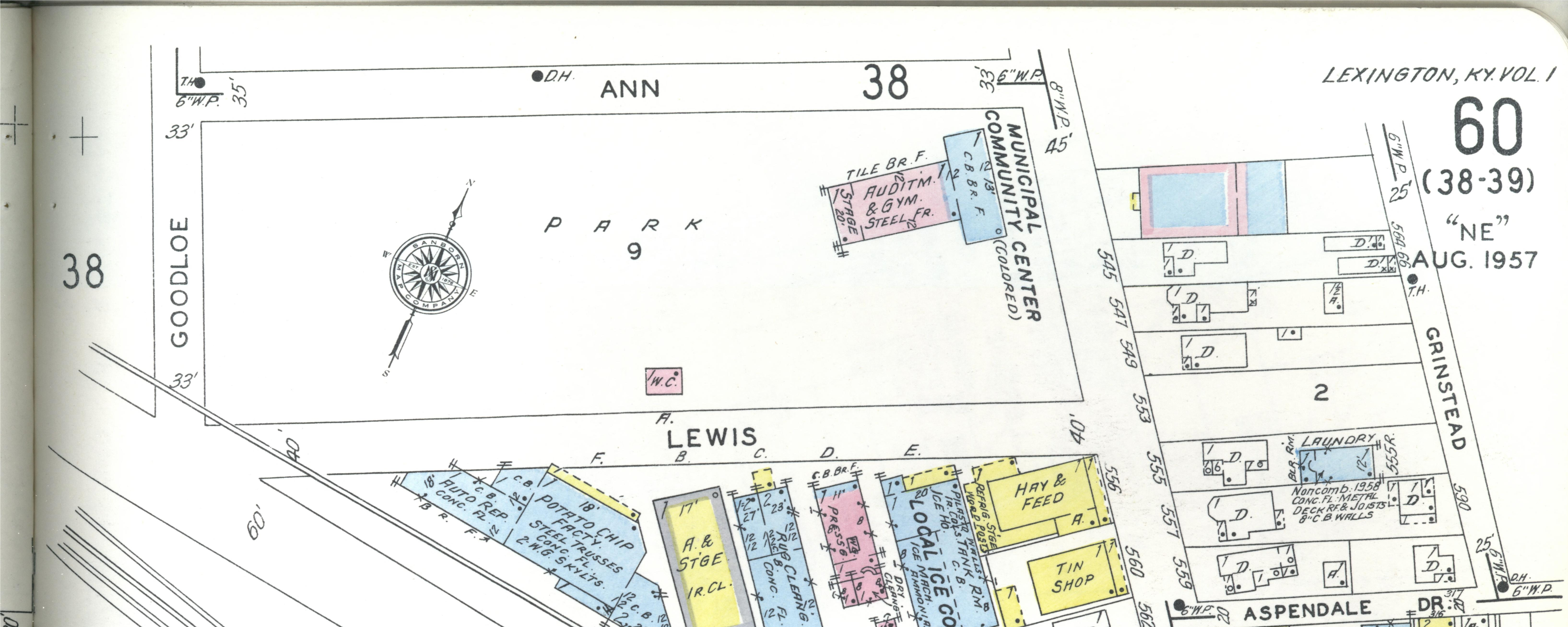
1958 Sanborn map of the park; the community center is labeled "Municipal Community Center (Colored)"

The park is located in the East End of Lexington, a neighborhood east of the city's downtown which grew rapidly after the Civil War. By the early 20th century, the East End was the center of the city's African-American community, with a large professional and cultural presence on Deweese Street, east of the present-day park. The site of the park was owned by the Goodloe family, who had developed the surrounding neighborhood of Goodloetown.

Charles Young Park was developed during a period of racial segregation in the Lexington park system, which was officially in effect from 1916 to 1956. Lexington's park system was officially racially integrated until 1916, although in practice, large parks such as Woodland Park had been unavailable to the city's Black residents for decades. The opening of Douglass Park in 1916 created the city's sole large park for Black residents. In other Kentucky cities, including Louisville, Henderson, and Hopkinsville, park segregation became official policy in the same early 20th-century period.

Douglass Park was funded by a 1913 bond issue that raised $25,000, equivalent to $582,000 in 2024. By 1930, $18,000 remained available from the bond, and a group of community leaders appealed to Lexington mayor James J. O'Brien to establish additional parks in the city for Black residents. The site of Charles Young Park was in consideration for a park as early as 1914, during the planning process for Douglass Park. The land for Charles Young Park was purchased from W. C. Goodloe in August 1930.

A community center opened at the park in 1935, funded by a grant from the Public Works Administration. Lexington-based architect John V. Moore designed the Charles Young Community Center in the Colonial Revival architectural style. Construction was contracted to the Smith-Haggard Lumber Company of Lexington, and began in the summer of 1934. The building was complete in February 1935, and a three-day grand opening ceremony was held in March, featuring a keynote speech by National Recreation Association leader Ernest T. Attwell.

Lexington's parks and recreation facilities were desegregated in 1956. Jack Givens, who was born the same year, recalled in a 2024 memoir that he played in his first indoor basketball league at the Charles Young Center at the age of "ten or eleven." While the center was officially integrated by the 1960s, racial segregation still had an impact on the Lexington park system in the following years. Historian Sallie L. Powell wrote that when Brenda Hughes began her basketball refereeing career in the 1960s at the Charles Young Center, "segregation dominated African American girls' sports involvement."

New basketball courts were installed at the park in September 2017, sponsored by professional basketball player Julius Randle. The dedication event caused controversy after 8 high school basketball players in the ceremony received penalties from the Kentucky High School Athletic Association for participating in a game at a disallowed time.

== Amenities ==
Charles Young Park features the Splash! splash pad, which opened in 2023. The splash pad is themed around the life and achievements of Charles Young, and was funded by private donations.

The park is located at the eastern end of two mixed-use trails in the Lexington area. The Town Branch Commons trail, opened in 2022, connects to downtown Lexington via Midland Avenue. The Legacy Trail, completed in 2020, originates at the adjacent Isaac Murphy Memorial Art Garden and travels approximately 12 miles (19 km) northwest to the Kentucky Horse Park.

== 2026 shooting ==
2026 Lexington shooting
- Date: August 15, 2026
- Time: 6:48 p.m. (Eastern Daylight Time)
- Location: Charles Young Park
- Motive: Unknown
- Deaths: 1
- Injuries: 4
- Suspects: 1

A mass shooting occurred at the park on August 15, 2026, at approximately 6:48 p.m. Eastern Time, during the East End Day community event. One person was killed and four people were injured. The shooting was caught on a livestream. On August 16, an 18-year-old suspect was arrested, and was charged with murder, assault, and tampering with evidence.

== See also ==
- Chickasaw Park
- Cherokee State Park
