= A. A. Burleigh =

American minister and soldier (c. 1845 – 1938)

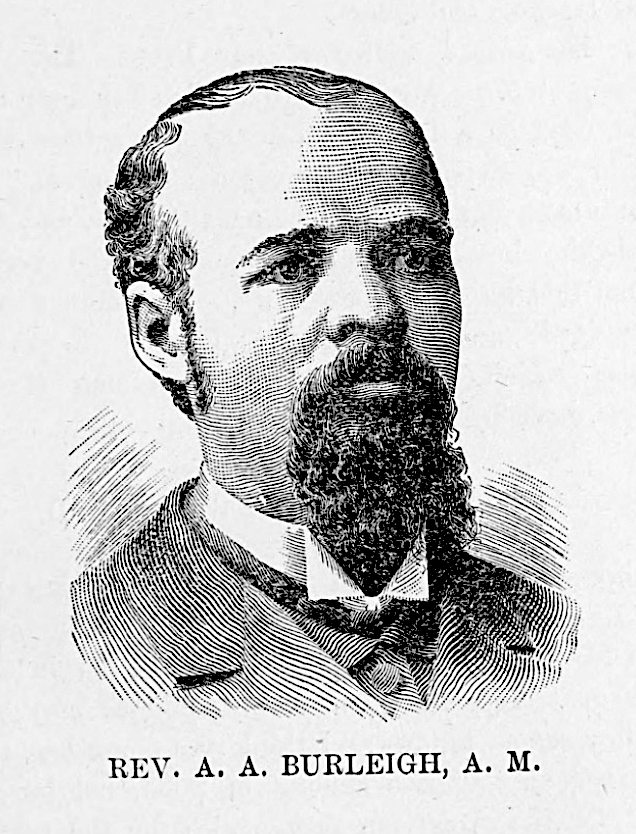
- Born: Angus Augustus Burleigh c. 1845 conflicting records
- Died: May 24, 1938; Los Angeles, California, U.S.
- Burial place: Los Angeles National Cemetery
- Spouse: Louisa E. Shaffer (m. 1875–?)
- Children: 3

Rev. Angus Augustus Burleigh (c. 1845 – 1938), commonly known as A. A. Burleigh, was an American A.M.E. minister, teacher, and soldier. He was formerly enslaved, fought in the Union Army during the American Civil War, and was the first African American adult to attend and graduate in 1875 from Berea College in Kentucky.

== Early life ==
Angus Augustus Burleigh was born in c. 1845, however the records of his birth have conflicting dates and locations according to the University Press of Kentucky. Many sources suggest he may have been born at sea. He was the son of Carlotta De Dasco, an African American woman who had been enslaved, from St. Augustine, Florida; and Charles A. Burleigh, an English sea captain.

Burleigh was abducted and enslaved in Virginia after his father's death in his early childhood. He is thought to have escaped in 1864, from a farm in Anderson County, Kentucky.

== Career ==
=== Civil war ===
On August 22, 1864, during the American Civil War, he enlisted as a private at Camp Nelson in Kentucky. He joined the 12th United States Colored Heavy Artillery Regiment, company G. On November 2, 1865, Burleigh was promoted to the rank of sergeant, before his discharge on April 24, 1866.

=== Berea College ===
Burleigh had met John Gregg Fee at Camp Nelson. Fee was the founder of Berea College, and invited Burleigh to attend classes and enroll as a student. He was the first African American adult to attend Berea College, which caused an exodus of many white students. In 1875, Burleigh was the first African American graduate from the school.

=== A.M.E. Church ===
He became a minister of the African Methodist Episcopal Church, and held pastorship in many locations nationally, including in San Francisco in 1906 at the Bethel African Methodist Episcopal Church. Other places of his residence included Brooklyn in New York City; Redondo Beach, California; Quincy, Illinois; Bloomington, Indiana; and Milwaukee.

== Death ==
Burleigh died on May 24, 1938, at a veterans hospital in Los Angeles, and is buried at Los Angeles National Cemetery.

Hasan Davis' Angus Augustus Burleigh: The Long Climb to Freedom (1997) is a stage performance about Burleigh's life.
