= Camp Nelson National Monument =

Museum and park in Kentucky

- U.S. National Register of Historic Places
- U.S. National Historic Landmark District
- U.S. National Monument
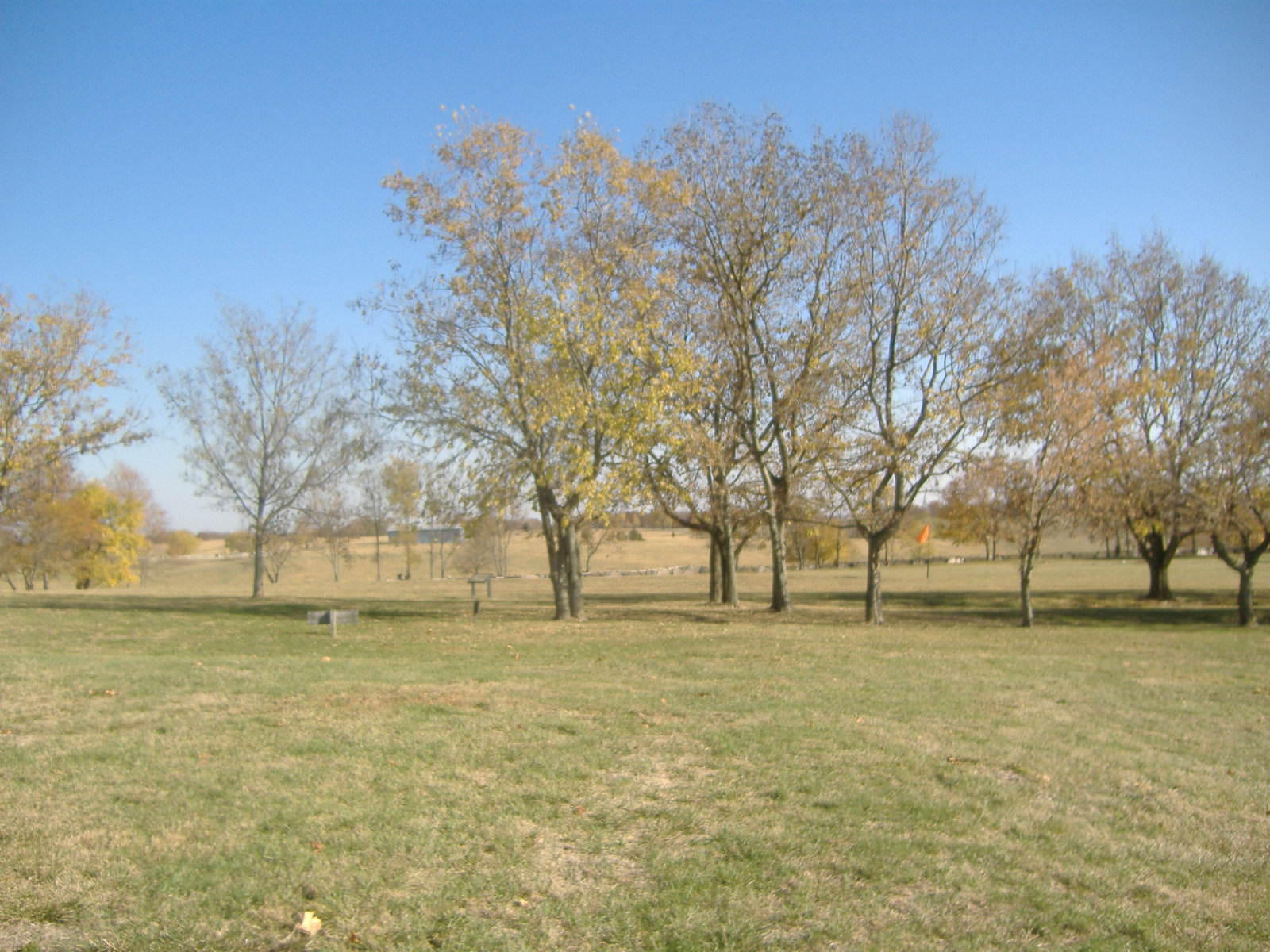
- Camp Nelson in 2008

- Location within Kentucky Location within the United States
- Interactive map of Camp Nelson National Monument
- Location: Jessamine County, Kentucky, U.S.
- Nearest city: Nicholasville, Kentucky
- Coordinates: 37°47′16″N 84°35′53″W
- Architect: U.S. Army of the Ohio Eng. Corps; Simpson, Lt.Col. J.H.
- Architectural style: Greek Revival
- Visitation: 20,763 (2025)
- Website: Camp Nelson National Monument
- NRHP reference No.: 00000861 (NRHP), 13000286 (NHL)

Significant dates
- Added to NRHP: March 15, 2001
- Designated NHLD: February 27, 2013
- Designated NMON: October 26, 2018

Camp Nelson National Monument, formerly the Camp Nelson Civil War Heritage Park, is a 525-acre (2.12 km^{2}) national monument, historical museum and park located in southern Jessamine County, Kentucky, United States, 20 miles (32 km) south of Lexington, Kentucky. The American Civil War era camp was established in 1863 as a depot for the Union Army during the Civil War. It became a recruiting ground for new soldiers from Eastern Tennessee and enslaved people, many of whom had fled their living conditions to be soldiers.

On October 26, 2018, President Donald Trump proclaimed the site as Camp Nelson National Monument, the 418th unit of the National Park Service (NPS) system. The Office of Kentucky Nature Preserves' Kentucky Heritage Land Conservation Fund funded the forested portion overlooking Hickman Creek.

The American Battlefield Trust and its partners joined forces in 2018 to help preserve more than 380 acres of Camp Nelson.

== History ==
=== Early years ===
Camp Nelson was established as a supply depot for Union advances into Tennessee. It was named for Major General William "Bull" Nelson, who had recently been murdered. It was placed near Hickman Bridge, the only bridge across the Kentucky River upriver from the state capital (Frankfort, Kentucky). The site was selected to protect the bridge, to have a base of operations in central Kentucky, and to prepare to secure the Cumberland Gap and eastern Tennessee. The camp was also used to train new soldiers for the Union army. The Kentucky River and Hickman Creek steep palisades contributed to the selection of the site. Only the northern side needed fortifications against Confederate attack since three sides have 400–500 feet almost vertical steep cliffs .

Camp Nelson may have been the choice for a central Kentucky depot, but it had disadvantages. When Union Major General Ambrose Burnside attacked the Cumberland Gap and Knoxville, Tennessee, Camp Nelson's distance from the Gap and Knoxville, combined with lack of railroads and the weather, hampered the Union advance.

Its drawbacks as a well situated supply depot led General William Tecumseh Sherman to prioritize Camp Nelson to take a major role in training 10,000 black soldiers who volunteered there for the U.S. Colored Troops. He advocated this role in response to overall Union commander Ulysses S. Grant who visited Camp Nelson in January 1864. Grant had observed the inadequacies in the overland supply routes employed and leaned toward abandoning it entirely. Despite Grant's misgivings, Camp Nelson continued supplying major battles in 1864 such as Saltville VA I and Saltville VA II, as well as Atlanta for which the site provided 10,000 horses.

Recognizing that the Camp Nelson supply depot and the nearby Hickman Bridge were valuable targets for Confederate raider General John Hunt Morgan, Union forces geared up for attacks in July 1863 and June 1864. The most serious threat was mid-June 1864, whereupon Brig. General Speed S. Fry called upon volunteers from among civilian employees. Six hundred were armed and performed guard duty at the northern fortifications around the clock for 6 days. Major C. E. Compton said that due to these civilians, “the depot was saved from capture and destruction.”

=== Black History: troops, impressed workers, refugees, and emancipation ===
Kentucky was one of four slaveholding states not joining the 11 other slaveholding southern states in forming the Confederate States of America which was in a rebellion rooted in decades of disputes over slavery. Kentucky blacks, enslaved and not, men and women, majorly contributed to the Union war effort in Kentucky initially as laborers, but ultimately as soldiers in infantry, artillery, and cavalry.

Because Kentucky was a slaveholding state, but not one in rebellion, those escaping could not be included as contrabands as defined by the Confiscation Act of 1861. This law applied to the Confederacy only and declared that if enslaved people are considered property, then the military has the right to not only deny the access to the owner but also to impress these individuals into work. Nonetheless, the Union Army in the state began impressing thousands of enslaved men, initially only the disloyal or those who had already fled into Union camps. In the case of disloyal or unknown slave holders, wages and subsistence were paid to the enslaved person. Loyal slaveholders were compensated.

Specific to Camp Nelson August 1863, Brig. General Jeremiah Boyle, authorized Commander Speed S. Fry to impress enslaved males, ages 16–45 within 14 counties of Central Kentucky, up to one-third of the enslaver's workforce. Just as the military contracted to buy food and livestock, likewise it contracted with slave owning Union loyalists to procure enslaved men to labor at Camp Nelson. An example is agent George Denny who impressed Gabriel Burdett from nearby farm of Hiram Burdett. Compensation of $30 per month for each impressed worker went to slave owners. By 1864, some like Gabriel Burdett would eventually enlist in the U.S. Colored Troops.

Consequentially, an estimated 3,000 impressed workers were stationed at Camp Nelson in 1863 performing labor-intensive tasks critical to the camp's founding and defense. Starting with fortifying the strategic Hickman Bridge in May, 1863, they aided in the construction of railroads, the northern fortifications and forts, and the 300 buildings.

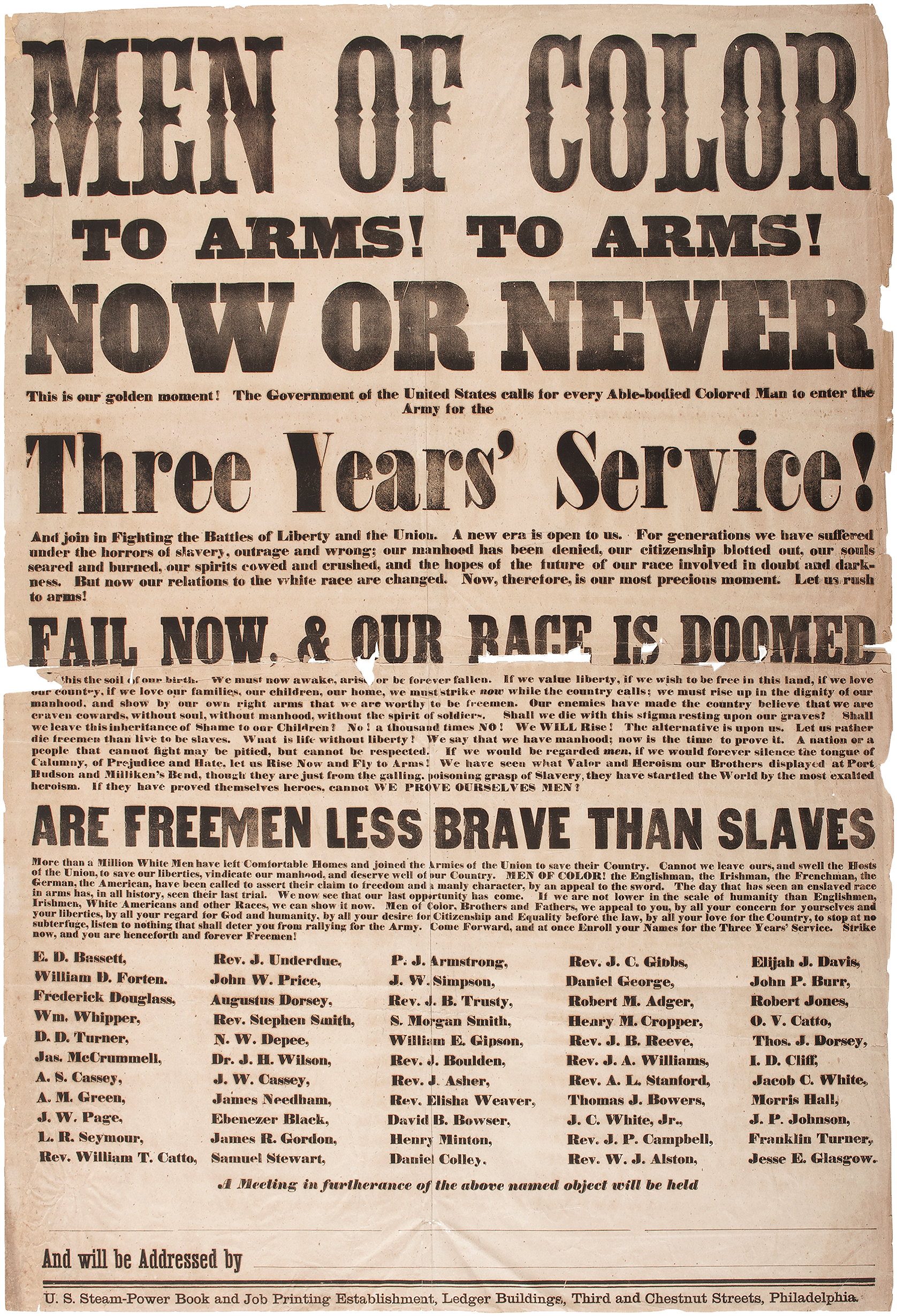
Recruitment broadside written by Frederick Douglass in 1863.

President Lincoln's Emancipation Proclamation of January 1, 1863 freed the enslaved only in the rebellious 11 states in the Confederacy. The War Department then publicly authorized the recruitment and training of African Americans in these states. Though a slave holding state, Kentucky was not in rebellion, so the proclamation and the military authorization did not apply.

Upon enlistment African Americans were emancipated from slavery in exchange for service in the Union Army. Kentucky recruited and trained more than 23,000 of the approximate 200,000 U.S. Colored Troops (USCT), making it the second-largest contributor of any state. Camp Nelson was the largest site in Kentucky with more than 10,000 recruits. Eight regiments were founded at Camp Nelson and five others were stationed there during the war.

With the goal of enlistment of Kentucky blacks into the Union Army, Lincoln authorized a special census in 1863 which showed 1,650 freemen and 40,000 enslaved males of military age. Given this figure and using the justification that whites were not fulfilling the state's draft quota, pro-slavery Governor Thomas E. Bramlette reluctantly agreed in March 1864 that African-American men in Kentucky were allowed to join the US Army with consent of their owners who received $300.

By April, enslaved men, despite the stipulation of owner consent, fled to enlist. The military, when uncertain of the consent, routinely sent men back to their owners. This situation led to a wave of violence as the military allowed squads hired to seize runaways from Camp Nelson. Chief Quartermaster Captain Theron E. Hall reported the site had become a “hunting ground for fugitives.” The army's help led to brutality. Owners severed ears and flayed men alive as they were bound to trees.

Due to the wave of violence, by June 1864 owners’ consent was no longer required, as ordered by Union Army Adj. Gen. Lorenzo Thomas.

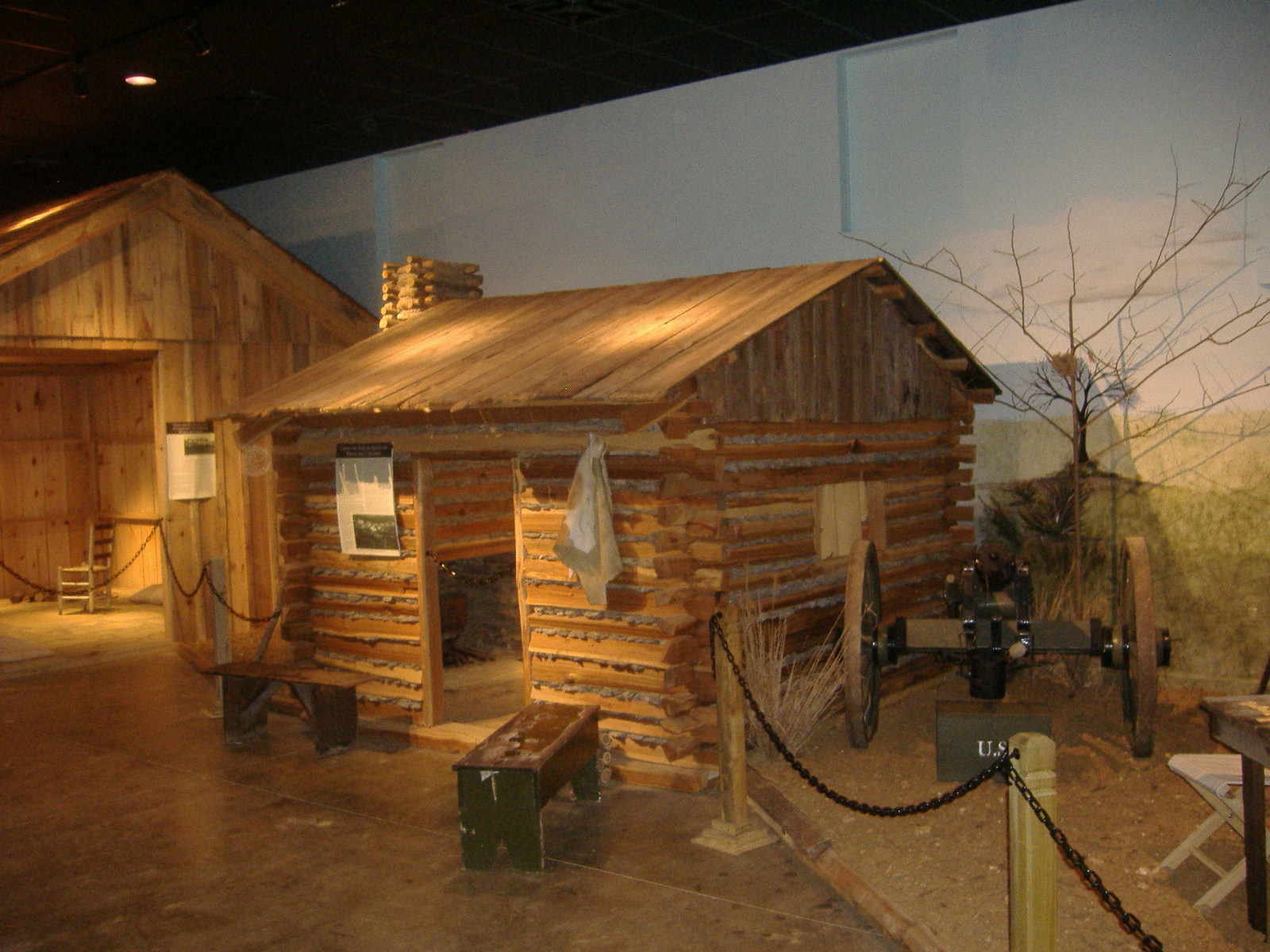
Replica of a refugee shanty used at Camp Nelson

Among groups of African-American recruits, the largest arrived between June and October 1864, with 322 men enlisting on a single day on July 25. In May, 1864, the first large group arrived, 250 recruits from Danville, a distance of 16 miles. These groups and others en route to Camp Nelson were subject to harassment and violence. For example, the Danville group “was assailed with stones and the content of revolvers,” reported Thomas Butler, superintendent of the United States Sanitary Commission.

Peter Bruner's attempt to enlist was initially thwarted when he was captured by men unknown to him and jailed in nearby Nicholasville with 24 others seeking USCT enlistment at Camp Nelson.

Rev. John Gregg Fee of the American Missionary Association (AMA) observed that “three of five recruits bore on their bodies marks of cruelty.” Despite this, army surgeons upon examining recruits found the vast majority to be healthy and very fit to serve.

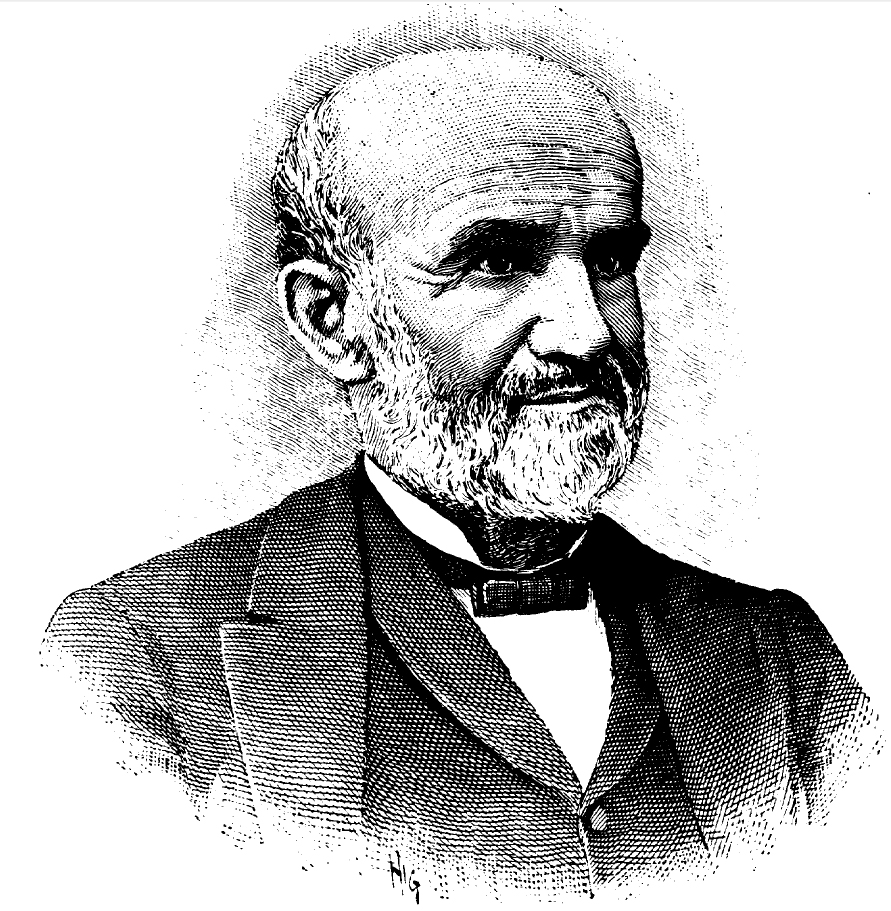
John Gregg Fee led the effort to secure housing, education, and aid for the families of the USCT.

Families of soldiers and others fleeing slavery seeking refuge at Union camps such as Camp Nelson were referred to as refugees. Unlike the soldiers, the refugees were initially not eligible for emancipation. The army did not have a clear policy for refugees, but they were allowed to establish a shanty village at Camp Nelson.

However, seven eviction orders were issued between July and November 1864, all intended to rid the camp of refugee families. Ordered to leave, the women and children habitually returned because they had nowhere else to go.

Since these orders were ineffective, on November 22–25, 1864, District Commander Speed S. Fry, native of nearby Danville, KY, under pressure from slave-owners, resorted to violence. He ordered soldiers to force out under threat of death 400 women and children onto wagons and escort them out of the camp. Fry ordered soldiers to torch the refugee huts. Temperatures that day were well below freezing. The refugees suffered 102 deaths due to exposure and disease.

Camp Nelson Chief Quartermaster Theron E. Hall and Reverend John Gregg Fee of the American Missionary Association led a public outcry to newspapers, high ranking Washington officials, and the northern public. Hall gathered testimony from USCT soldiers on the battered conditions of their families and submitted them to Brig. General Stephen G. Burbridge, commander of the District of Kentucky. Burbridge ordered Fry to immediately cease expulsions, allow the families to return, and provide quarters. Edwin Stanton, Lincoln's Secretary of War, followed up with an order that a permanent shelter be established for all refugees, regardless of any family ties to USCT troops.

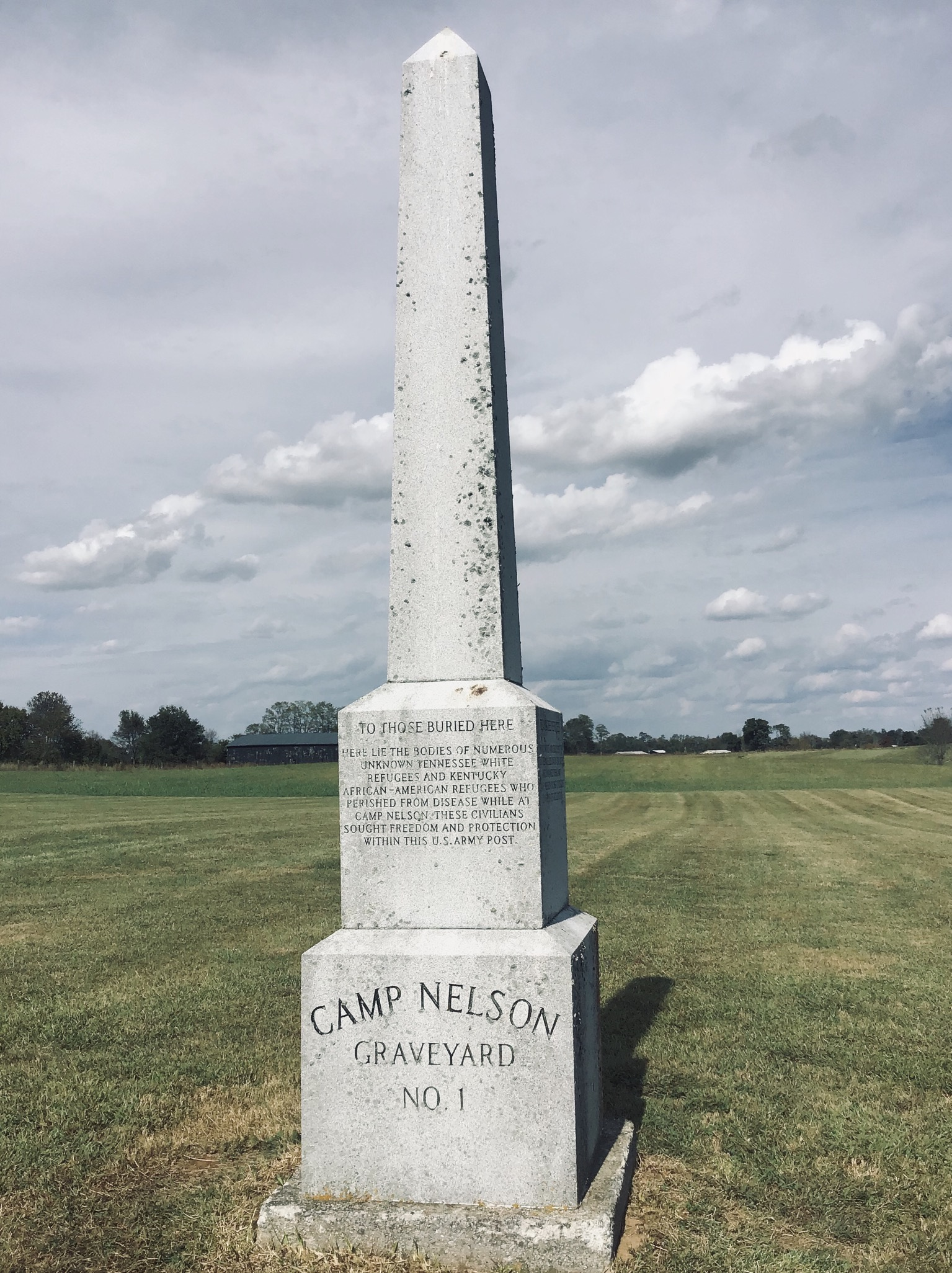
The obelisk honors the refugees who are buried here. The refugees were primarily family of the US Colored Troops or the East Tennessee Unionists who enlisted here.

The New York Tribune published a front page account on Nov. 28, 1864 entitled Cruel Treatment of the Wives and Children of U.S. Colored Soldiers. “At this moment, over four hundred helpless human beings....having been driven from their homes by United States soldiers, are now lying in barns and mule sheds, wandering through the woods....literally starving, for no other crime than their husbands and fathers having thrown aside the manacles of Slavery to shoulder Union muskets.”

By December 1864, the military reversed its policies, and authorized the construction of the Home for Colored Refugees. Included were 16 by 16 foot duplex cottages for families, a mess hall, barracks, a school, teachers’ quarters and a dormitory.

Spurred by these events, on March 3, 1865, a Congressional Act was passed that freed the wives and children of the U.S. Colored Troops. This blow to slavery caused the population of the Home to peak at 3,060 by July 1865. This surpassed capacity, and added were 60 army supplied large wall tents as well makeshift housing constructed by the refugees, similar to before the expulsion. An obelisk at the refugee cemetery north of the Interpretive Center honors the memory of about 300 of the refugees who died at Camp Nelson. Some of those perished as a result of the expulsion of November 1864.

The two story school was staffed by the AMA and the Western Freedman's Aid Commission. Two African Americans were included, E. Belle Jackson and Reverend Gabriel Burdett who was also a USCT soldier and assisted Fee in ministry work. The AMA's position on total racial equality was tested at Camp Nelson when Fee hired Jackson. The AMA-salaried white teachers refused to eat in the same dining room with her and walked out in protest.

Also included were two barracks that became the refugee hospital. Infectious disease was prevalent and some 1300 refugees died at Camp Nelson.

Units raised at Camp Nelson are the 5th and 6th U.S. Colored Cavalry (USCC); the 114th, 116th, 119th, and 124th Colored Infantry; and the 13th and 12th United States Colored Heavy Artillery.

=== Notable engagements of Camp Nelson Colored Troops ===
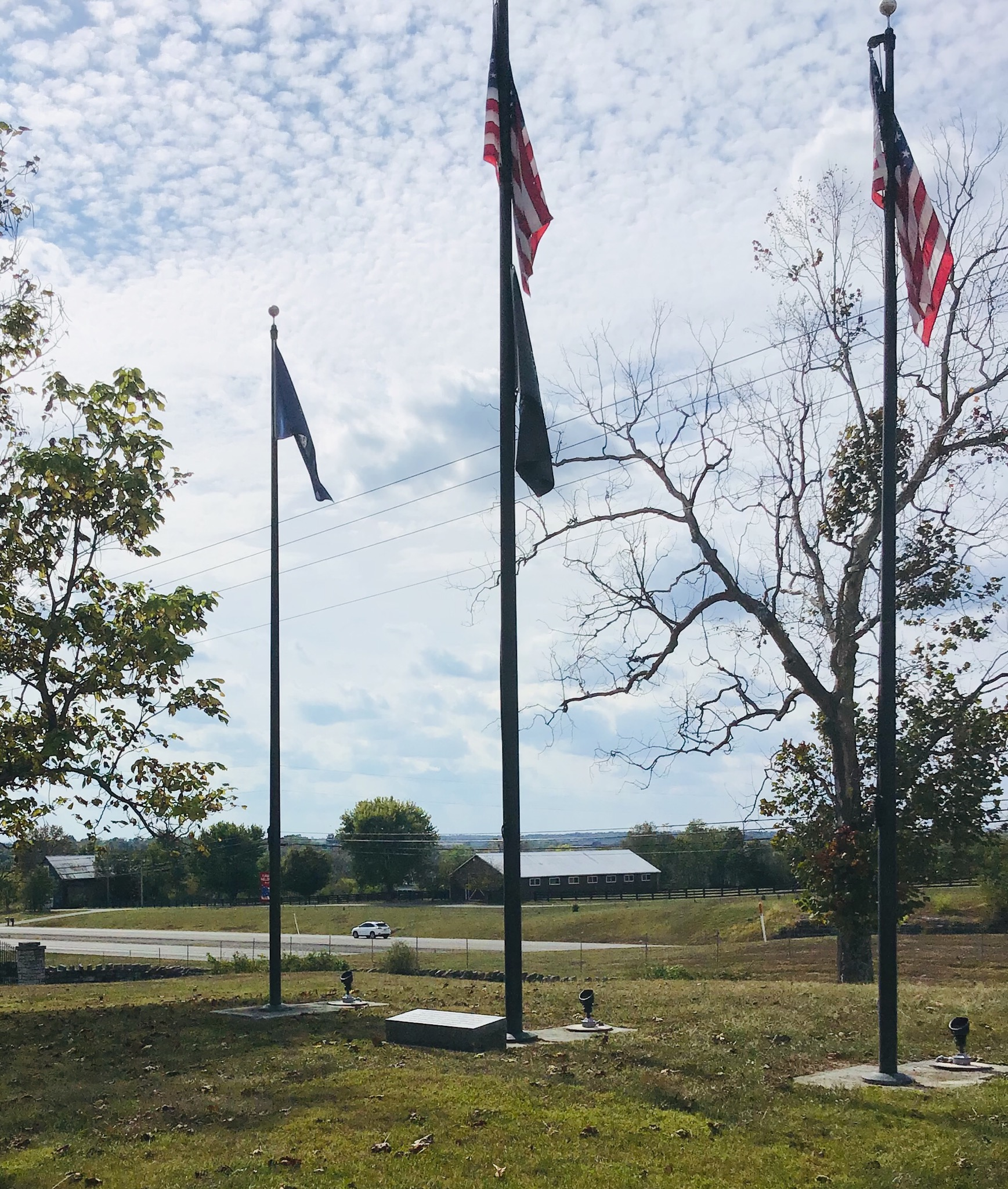
Two U.S. flags and a state of Kentucky flag flying above a memorial honoring USCC who died at Battle of Saltville I.

Among notable engagements of the 5th and 6th USCC are the Battle of Saltville I and the Battle of Saltville II in southwestern Virginia. Brig. General Stephen G. Burbridge lead the Ill-fated Saltville I, the objective of which was to destroy the Confederate saltworks, which had been fortified by impressed enslaved workers whose owners were compensated. Though Saltville I in October 1864 was a defeat, Colonel James Sanks Brisbin reported his admiration for the bravery and tenacity of the 400 soldiers, noting that he'd been in 27 battles with the white troops and seen none more courageous. Of the colored troops, 10 were killed in action and 37 wounded. Post battle, a scene of criminal violence was unleashed. Soldiers in the 5th USCC and in two companies of the 6th USCC were murdered, some in a hospital, totaling 47. Leading these attacks was Champ Ferguson, who after the war was tried in Nashville, TN for War crimes, sentenced to death, and hanged in October 1865.

In December 1864, in the successful second assault on Saltville were the 5th and 6th USCC, units which included survivors of the first battle. General George Stoneman and Burbridge engaged General John C. Breckinridge, a Kentuckian and former vice president, in nearby Marion, VA, outnumbering their opponents by four to one. Breckinridge retreated after two days. Union troops destroyed the saltworks, and considerably damaged neighboring lead mines and railroads. The USCC troops continued to add to their hard-won reputation.

The USCC 5th were again subjected to a murderous assault like that of Saltville I in January 1865 in Simpsonville, KY. Assigned to herd about 1,000 cattle from Camp Nelson to Louisville, KY, 80 soldiers of Company E 5th USCC were ambushed by Confederate guerrillas led by Capt. Dick Taylor. First attacked were the 41 soldiers bringing up the rear, most of whom could not fire due to fouled powder. Locals found 15 dead and 20 wounded and reported Taylor's men boasting about murdering 19 Union soldiers. Lt. Colonel Louis H. Carpenter of the 5th documented the names of the guerrillas and urged a prosecution. This never happened. In 2009, a memorial was placed on the site of the ambush.

The 6th USCC and the 114th and 116th Colored Infantry were active in General Grant's Appomattox Campaign, March to April 1864. These units took part in both the siege of Petersburg, Virginia and of Richmond, Virginia, the capitol and seat of government of the Confederacy. These soldiers were engaged in the pursuit of Confederate General Robert E. Lee to the Appomattox Courthouse where they witnessed the surrender of the Confederate Army.

=== White Refugees and Union Troops from East Tennessee ===
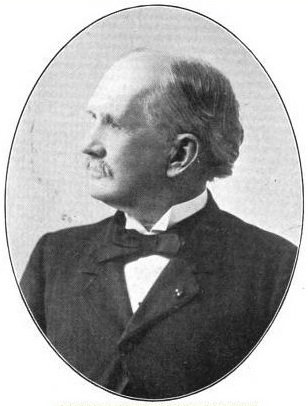
Union loyalist Felix A. Reeve raised and commanded the 8th Tennessee Volunteer Infantry.

Though Tennessee was officially a state in rebellion, loyalty to the Confederacy was weak in its eastern Appalachian section. This may be attributable to the comparably low rate of enslaved population, which ranged from 3.5 to 11% as opposed to the 40% to 50% in the western part of the state. View this on an 1860 U.S. Census map, which shows this rate for all counties in slave-holding states.

Thousands of the destitute from this area came in a constant steam seeking succor at Camp Nelson. Thomas D. Butler, a superintendent of the United States Sanitary Commission, who had as his responsibility their care, described the situation of one refugee family with six children, “...the rebels had driven her and her children from their home, and destroyed their property...for many weeks...wandered, homeless, hungry and sick, through cold and stormy weather, to reach Camp Nelson.” The husband was a discharged Union soldier who was captured en route with the family. He escaped and journeyed to Camp Nelson where the family was reunited.

Several East Tennessee regiments were trained and organized here.

- Commanded by Felix A. Reeve, the 8th Tennessee Volunteer Infantry, organized at Camp Dick Robinson and Camp Nelson from November 1862 to August 1863, participated in the Knoxville Campaign and subsequent East Tennessee operations from November 4 to December 23, 1863.
- Five companies of the 5th East Tennessee Cavalry (also known as the 8th Tennessee Cavalry) June to August 1863
- The 10th, 12th, 13th Cavalry and Battery E of First Tennessee Light Artillery

For a 10-minute video summary of the site's history and significance narrated by Dr. W. Stephen McBride, former director of interpretation and archaeology, go to this link.

=== Post War ===
After the war, Camp Nelson was a center for giving ex-slaves their emancipation papers. Many have considered the camp as their "cradle of freedom".

The United States Sanitary Commission (USSC) operated a soldiers' home for a time at Camp Nelson, in former barracks. It was one of a series of homes and rest houses they operated for soldiers.

Here are some post-war achievements of Camp Nelson U.S. Colored Troops.

Angus Augustus Burleigh (also known as A. A. Burleigh), was literate and enlisted at age 16, becoming a sergeant with the 12th Regiment Heavy Artillery U.S. Colored Troops after an escape from an Anderson County farm. In 1875, he was the first black graduate of Berea College as well as the first black adult male to enroll. Later he was ordained a Methodist Episcopal minister and held pastorates in several states and served as chaplain to the Illinois State Senate.

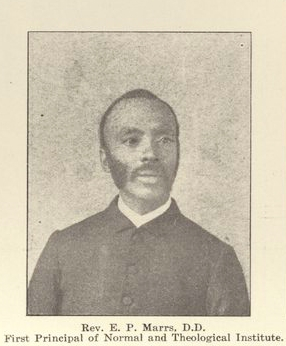
Rev. Elijah P. Marrs 1915

Elijah P. Marrs led 27 others from to Louisville from neighboring Simpsonville, Ky. to join the USCT. Marrs, another sergeant with the 12th US Colored Heavy Artillery, trained at Camp Nelson where he also taught reading. After the war, Marrs taught school and was ordained a Baptist minister. In 1879, he and his brother founded Baptist Normal and Theological Institute in Louisville, which became Simmons Bible College. Marrs was active with the Republican party in Kentucky. His autobiography is downloadable from the University of North Carolina's Documenting the American South Digital Publishing Initiative.

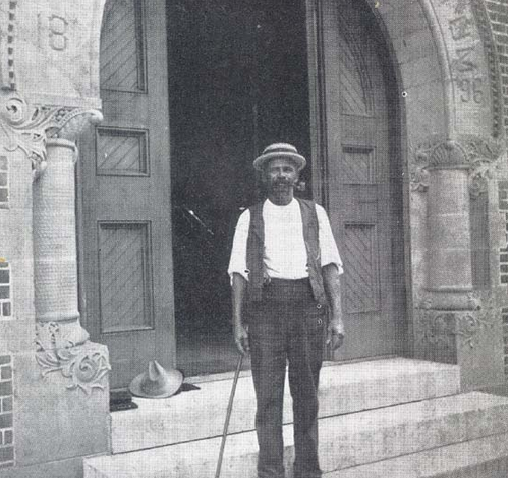
Peter Bruner at Miami University in Ohio where he worked

Peter Bruner wrote with his daughter his autobiography, A Slave’s Adventure Toward Freedom, Not Fiction, but the True Story of a Struggle, also included in the UNC's Documenting the American South. He recounts his frequently made unsuccessful escape attempts and subsequent severe punishments. Another member of the 12th, he enlisted with 16 other men, walking 41 miles from Irvine, Ky. Post war, Bruner moved to Oxford, Ohio and became the first African American to work at Miami University where he also enrolled. In addition to his work as a custodian and messenger, he served as a ceremonial greeter wearing a top hat and tails. He raised five children with his wife Frances Proctor. He is listed on plaque B-26 at the African American Civil War Memorial in Washington DC. His ceremonial top hat is on display at the McGuffey House and Museum of Miami University.

Gabriel Burdette while enslaved in neighboring Garrard County became active in the ministry serving at the Forks Dix River Church. Having been among the 1863 impressed workers, he enlisted July 1864 in the 114th U.S. Colored Infantry. He served as a teacher, nurse, and minister, leading in the development of education, housing, and aid for the refugees. He began a 12-year association with John Fee and the American Missionary Association. After serving in both Tennessee and Texas, Burdett returned and was instrumental in establishing Ariel Academy. He became the first African American on the Berea College Board of Trustees, serving 12 years. Involved in the Republican Party, the same party of President Lincoln, he campaigned in the 1872 presidential for the reelection of former Union General Grant. He served as a voting member at both the 1872 and 1876 Republican National Conventions. The violence associated with the 1876 presidential election convinced Burdett to join the Exodusters Movement to the West and emigrate with his family to Kansas. The path of his life is followed in some detail in this account of African Americans’ struggle for freedom during and post Civil War.

== Recent times ==
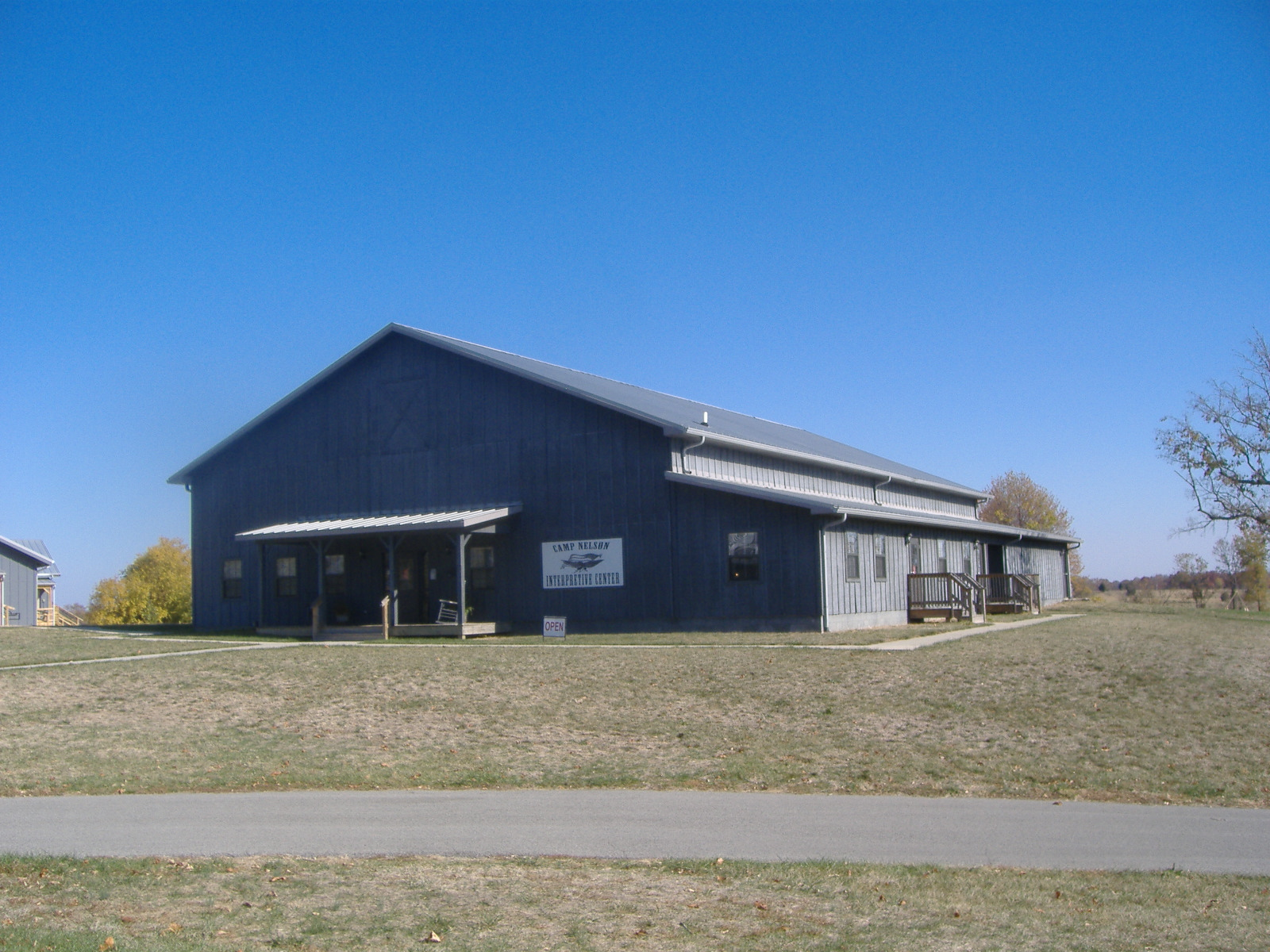
Camp Nelson Interpretive Center

Presently, 525 acres (2.12 km^{2}) of the original property are preserved as the Camp Nelson National Monument. Most of the buildings at the camp were sold. The camp is listed on the National Register of Historic Places and was declared a National Historic Landmark District in March 2013. The site is also part of the National Underground Railroad Network to Freedom, which runs through several states and has sites in Canada and the Antilles.

In a more rural area than the other former USCT recruitment sites, Camp Nelson is the only one whose land was never developed after the war for other purposes.

During its existence as Camp Nelson Civil War Heritage Park, Camp Nelson was controlled by the Jessamine County Fiscal Court. The forested portion overlooking Hickman Creek was funded by the Office of Kentucky Nature Preserves' Kentucky Heritage Land Conservation Fund.

In August 2017, U.S. Secretary of the Interior Ryan Zinke suggested to U.S. president Donald Trump that Camp Nelson Civil War Heritage Park be made into a national monument. On June 5, 2018, the United States House of Representatives approved U.S. Representative Andy Barr's sponsored H.R. 5655, Camp Nelson Heritage National Monument Act, aimed at establishing Camp Nelson as a part of the national park system. On July 26, 2018, a companion bill, S. 3287, was introduced in the United States Senate. On August 15, 2018, a national park committee hearing was held regarding the bill, but Congress took no further action on the legislation. On October 26, 2018, Trump used the Antiquities Act to approve the creation of Camp Nelson National Monument, transferring ownership and management of Camp Nelson to the National Park Service. The John D. Dingell Jr. Conservation, Management, and Recreation Act, signed March 12, 2019, incorporated the bill and statutorily established the monument under the name Camp Nelson Heritage National Monument, though the National Park Service has maintained the original name. Representative Barr introduced legislation in 2024 that would correct the statutory name to match that in the establishing proclamation.

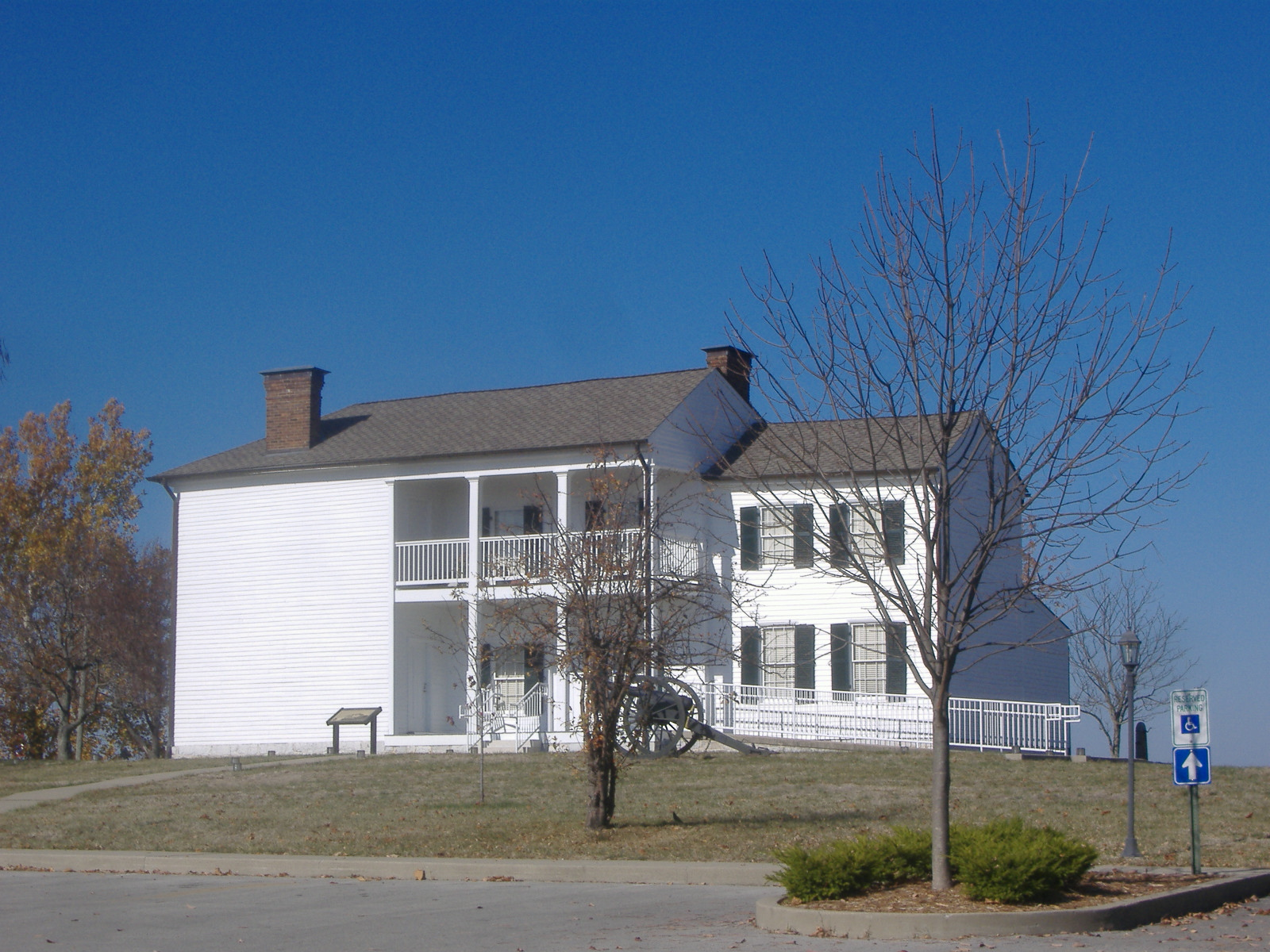
The only remaining original structure, the Oliver Perry House, built in 1846 and served as officers’ quarters. Currently under renovations, the house will reopen to visitors upon completion.

The Oliver Perry House is the only surviving structure from its years as a camp. It was built in about 1846 for the newlywed couple of Oliver Perry and the former Fannie Scott. General Burnside confiscated the house during the war to serve as officers quarters. In many official letters, the house was called the "White House". It currently is under renovation.

The park has five miles of walking trails, open dawn to dusk, lining the northern border where remnants of the forts and fortifications are marked with historic signage. Fort Putnam has been reconstructed to the specifications of the original engineering plan. Re-enactors of the USCC 5th fire the site's Napoléon 12 pound cannon there during the Annual Civil War Heritage Weekend held in mid-September. The date of President Lincoln's death, April 15, 1865, is commemorated with a ceremonial firing at Fort Putnam. The Visitor Center offers a 17-minute film and a museum. The National Park Service offers year-round indoor and outdoor programming.

Camp Nelson National Cemetery is one mile to the south. It has organized records of burials online so that families may trace relatives buried here, in addition to those who trained or lived at the camp.

== Media Portrayals ==
Load in Nine Times by Frank X. Walker, former Poet Laureate of Kentucky. Inspired by researching his ancestors who enlisted at Camp Nelson, Walker moves chronologically from the antebellum era through Reconstruction. His forebears are Mary and Randal Edelen, 125th UCST Infantry and Elvira and Henry Clay Walker, 12th USCT Heavy Artillery. Walker weaves poetry together through the voices of the U.S. Colored Troops, their families, enslavers, and such historical figures as Frederick Douglass, Abraham Lincoln and Margaret Garner. Gabriel Burdett of 114th U.S. Colored Infantry tells his story. A presentation with the author can be viewed here.

The Civil War's Last Massacre on the PBS series Secrets of the Dead depicts the second murderous assault on the USCC 5th in Simpsonville, KY in January 1865. Dead were 15 with 20 wounded.

Reel History, a presentation at Camp Nelson by historian Jared Frederick, explores interpretations of African American Civil War soldiers through films from Birth of a Nation to Glory.

== Gallery ==
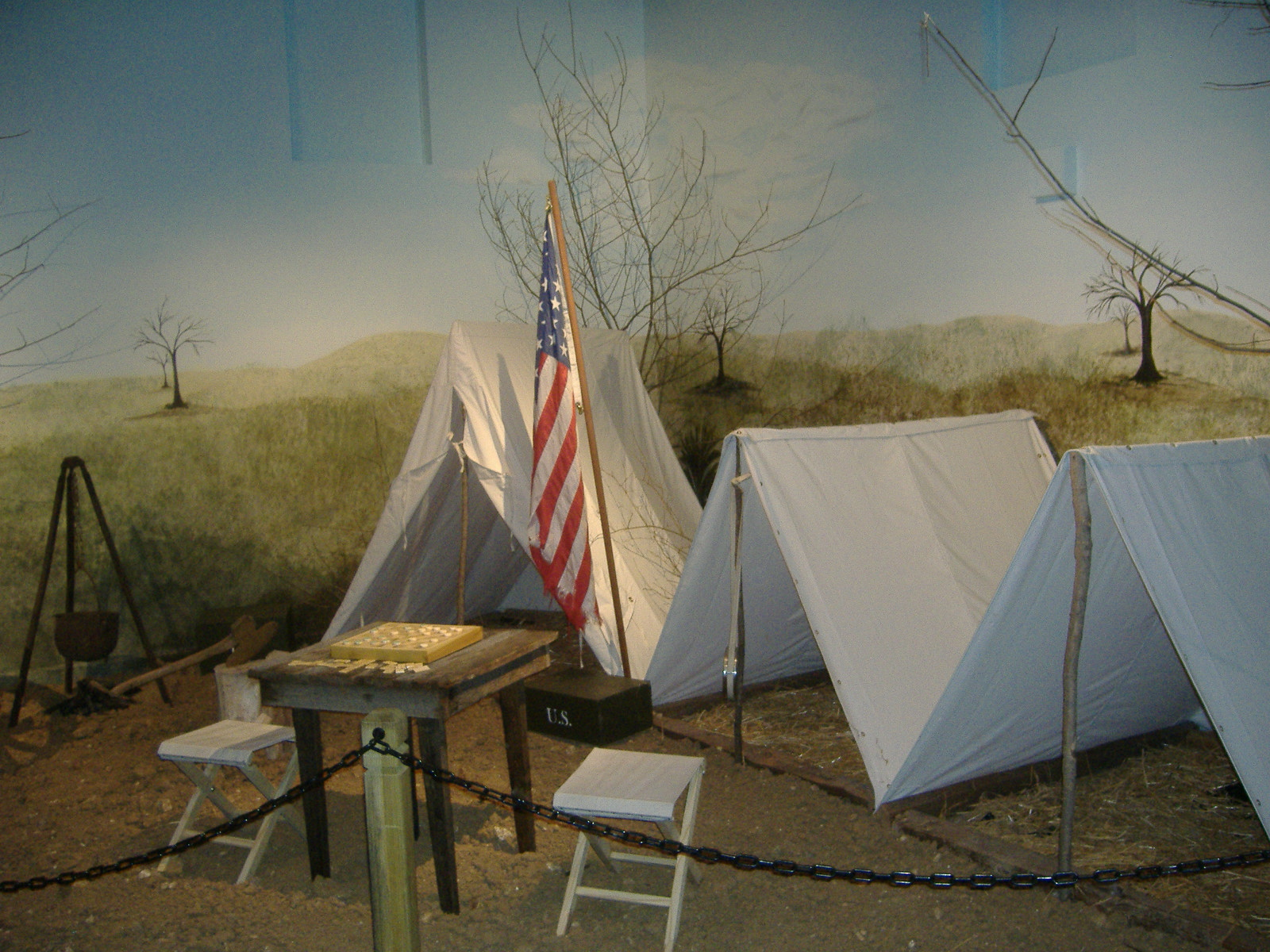
Tent encampment is on display in Interpretive Center

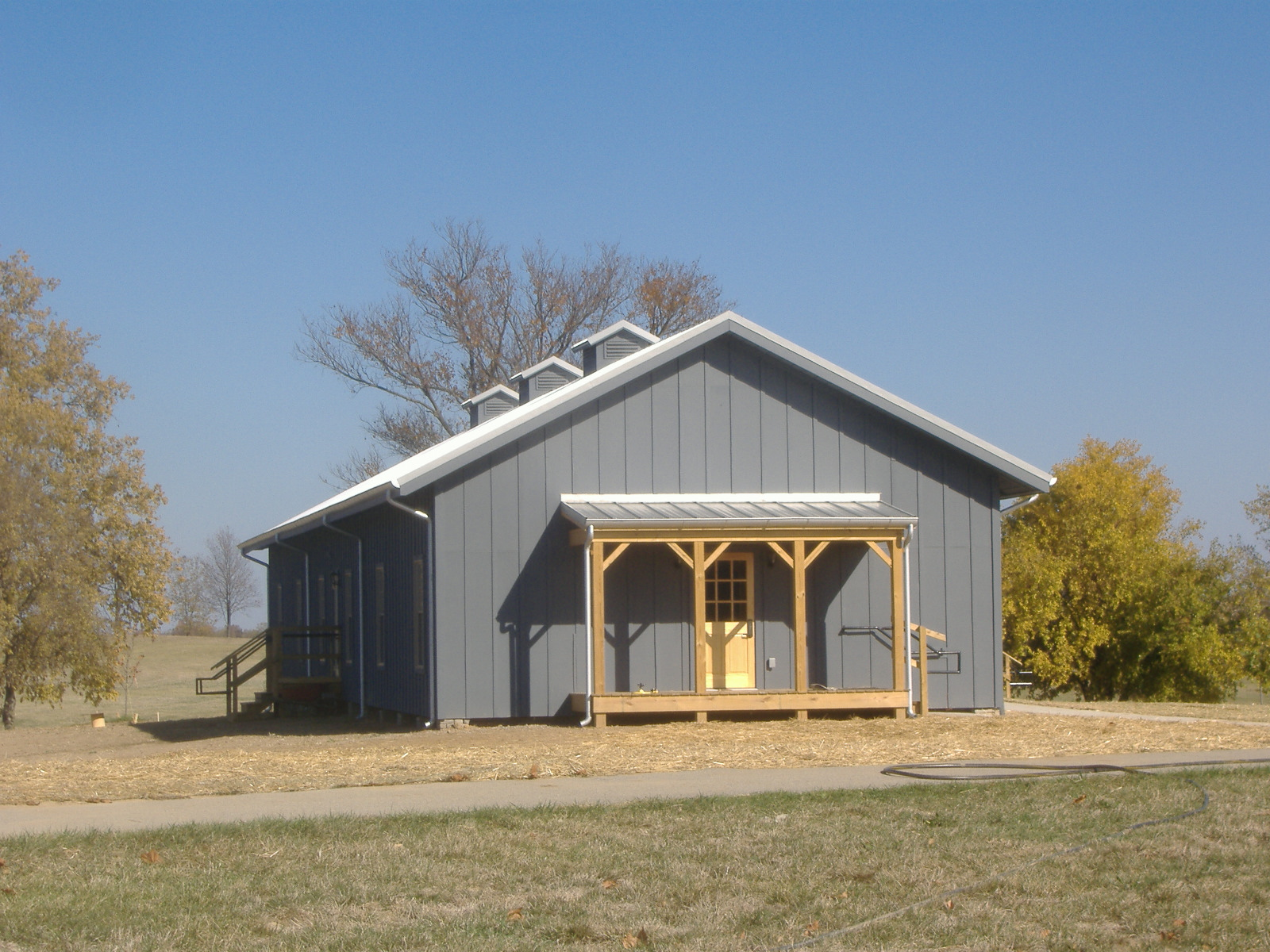
The Barracks is close to the visitor center

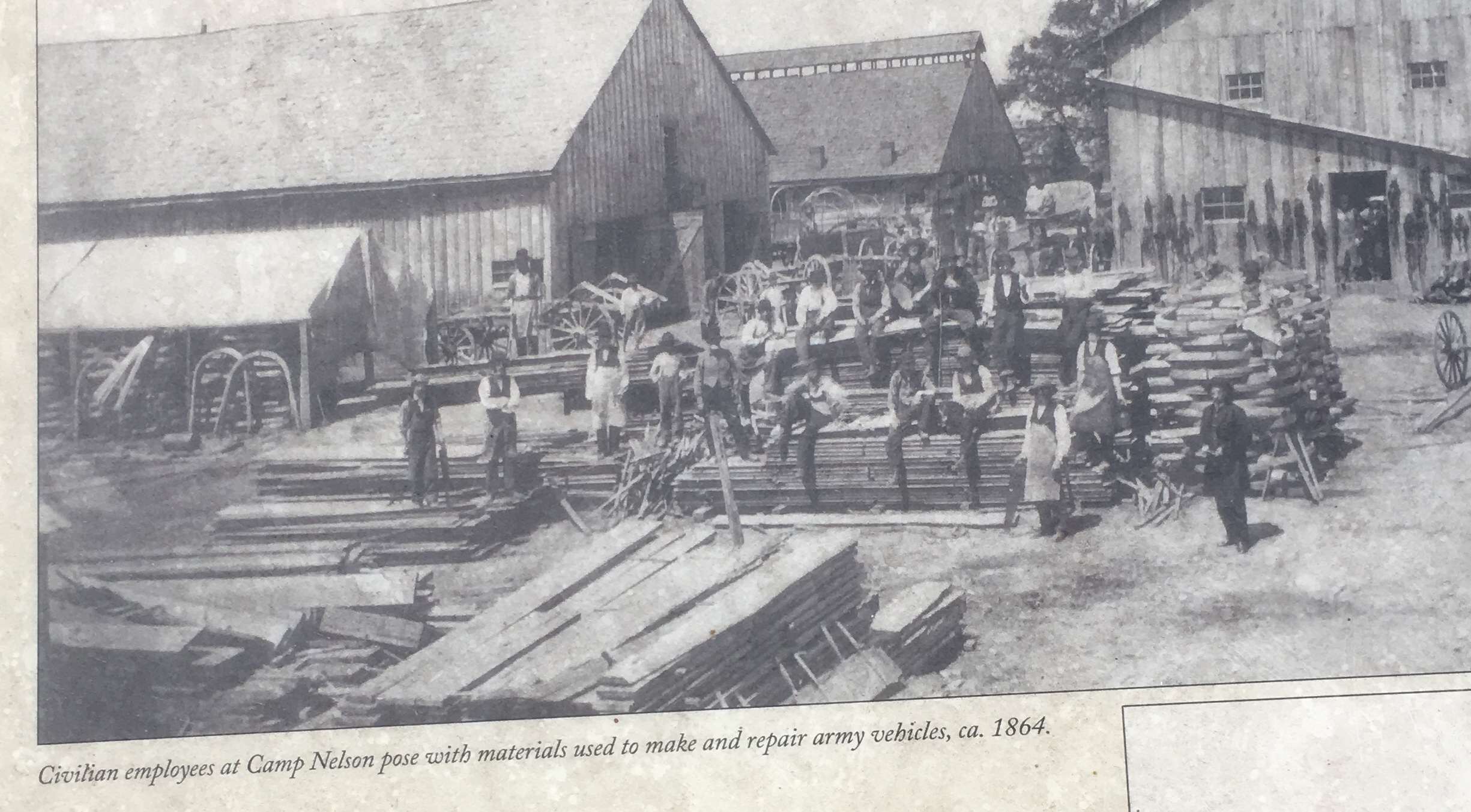
Camp Nelson civilian employees pose with materials to make and repair military vehicles

== See also ==
- List of national monuments of the United States
- African Americans in the Civil War
- Colored Soldiers Monument in Frankfort
- United States Sanitary Commission, photo of Camp Nelson soldiers' home
- 12th Regiment Heavy Artillery U.S. Colored Troops, organized and sometimes stationed at Camp Nelson
- E. Belle Jackson, first African American educator at Camp Nelson
- 5th United States Colored Cavalry Regiment
