= Peter Bruner =

African-American slave, soldier and author

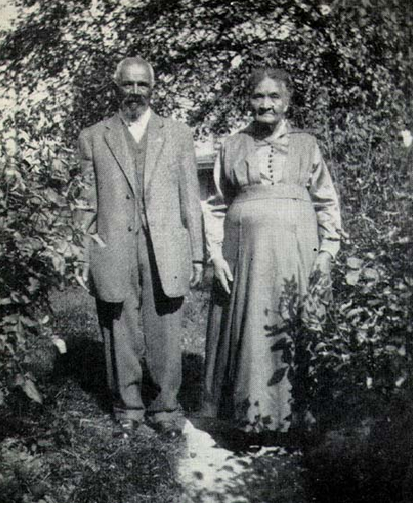
- Peter Bruner with his wife, about 1919.
- Born: c. 1845; Clark County, Winchester, Kentucky
- Died: April 6, 1938 (aged 93); Oxford, Ohio
- Occupations: Slave; soldier; custodian; author
- Known for: A Slave's Adventures Toward Freedom Not a Fiction, but the True Story of a Struggle
- Spouse: Frances Proctor

Peter Bruner (c. 1845 – April 6, 1938) was born a slave in Kentucky. He escaped enslavement to join the Union Army during the Civil War. After the war, he married and raised a family in Ohio. Collaborating with his daughter, he published his autobiography.

== Early life ==
Bruner was born in about 1845, in Winchester, Clark County, Kentucky. His mother had three children, including Peter, and would fight with her master John Bell Bruner over her children. Peter's father was his master.

When Bruner was about 10 years old John Bell Bruner was offered $800 for Peter, but told the man that "he was growing into money" and before long would be worth $200 more than that. He was removed from his mother at a young age and worked as a tanner; he was also hired out to work for others. Bruner was beaten and tried to escape many times, having endured "extreme physical violence and psychological deprivation." The sister of his owner threatened that: "she wanted to buy me for the sole purpose of whipping me; she said if she could whip me and break me in she could stop me from running off."

== Civil War ==
On July 25, 1864, after numerous attempts, he escaped slavery and joined the Union Army as a free man at Camp Nelson in Kentucky, serving in Company C of the 12th Regiment Heavy Artillery U.S. Colored Troops, as part of the United States Colored Troops.

During his initial attempt to join the army in August 1863, he had been told it was a "white man's war". Kentucky was the last state to accept African-American men into their army. In February 1864, there were 400 men who wanted to enlist and Col. Andrew H. Clark began enlisting them. By June of that year there were 1,500 enlisted colored soldiers. On June 13, 1864, restrictions were lifted requiring men to be free or have their owner's written permission to engage in the war. From that point forward, anyone who enlisted was emancipated.

Bruner described the events of his second, successful attempt to enlist in his book A Slave's Adventures Toward Freedom: "The next morning about five o'clock I had gone twenty-one miles and had arrived at Richmond. After I had left Richmond I came upon sixteen colored fellows who were on their way to Camp Nelson and of course I did not get lonesome. Just a half hour before sundown we arrived at Camp Nelson and had come forty-one miles in that day.

The officers asked me what I wanted there and I told them that I came there to fight the rebels and that I wanted a gun". Camp Nelson became the third largest recruiting and training center for African-American men: more than 10,000 men were recruited there.

Unlike the all-white unit that guarded central Kentucky for the Union in 1863, the new army welcomed, initiated, trained, and commanded thousands of African American soldiers willing to fight the Confederates and, more immediately, to attain their freedom.

Bruner served in western and central Kentucky, performing garrison duty. He was mustered out of the army in 1866 and went to Winchester, Kentucky, to visit his mother, whom he had not seen for 18 years, before moving to Ohio.

Peter Bruner is listed on plaque B-26 at the African American Civil War Memorial in Washington, D.C.

== Marriage and children ==
In 1866, he moved to Oxford, Ohio, where his aunt and uncle named the Brassfields lived. On March 10, 1868, he married Frances Proctor, the daughter of a free black farmer; they raised five children, including four daughters, together. He and his family were long-term members of the Bethel African Methodist Episcopal Church (A.M.E. Church) in Oxford.

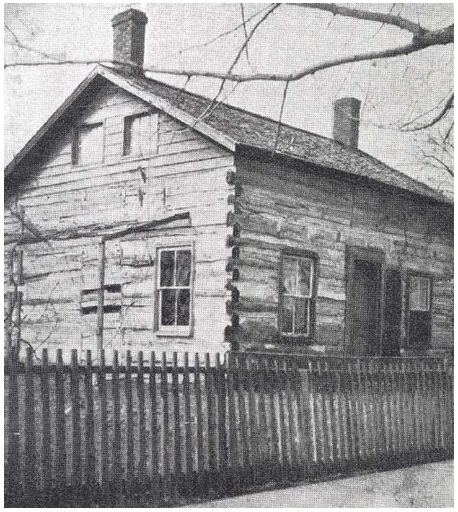
Home where Peter Bruner lived as a young man

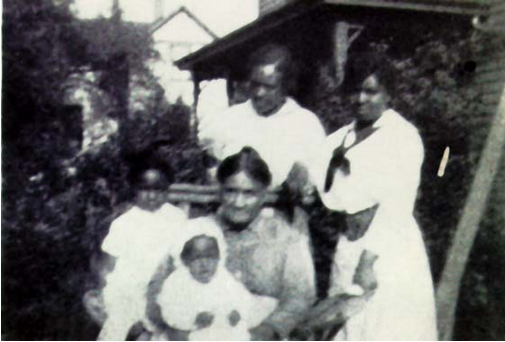
Peter Bruner's family, in or before 1919

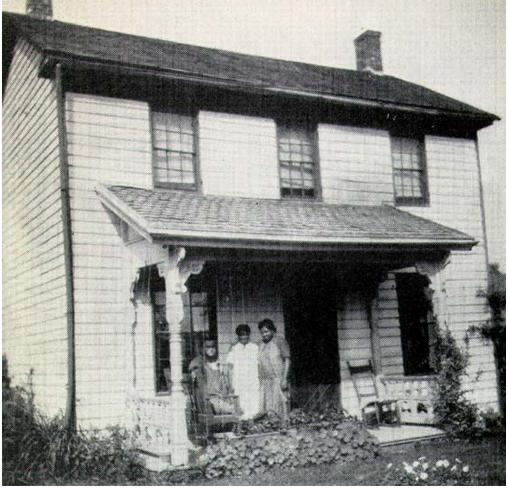
Home where Peter Bruner raised his family

Well liked in the community, he was appointed "Mayor for the Day" of Oxford, Ohio, in April 1938.

== Miami University ==
Bruner worked as a custodian and messenger at Western Female Seminary, Oxford College, which merged into Miami University. (Note: Prior to working at the organizations that became the united Miami University, Bruner worked as a watchman, handyman and farm laborer.)

He was the first African-American man to work at Miami University.

He learned to read and write. In his autobiography he said that he went to school in Oxford and "studied reading, writing, geography and spelling, and have not got it yet".

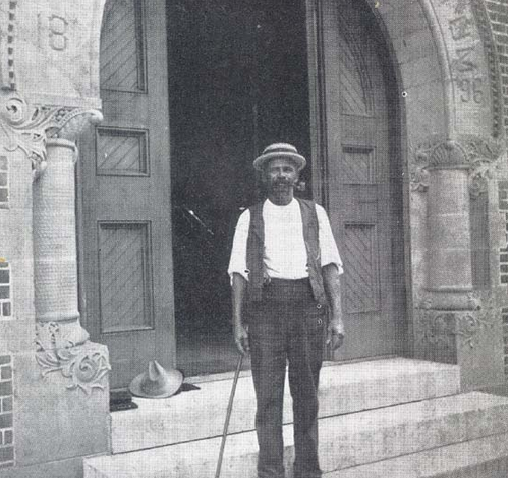
Peter Bruner at Miami University, where he worked.

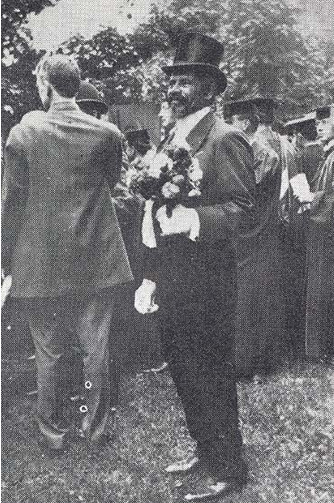
Peter Bruner, the day President Taft visited Miami University

Bruner often served as ceremonial greeter at the university, wearing top hat and tails. His top hat is exhibited at the William H. McGuffey House Museum at Miami University.

Several of his grandchildren and great-grandchildren were able to graduate from Miami University, including Thomas Monroe Cheeks, Carrie Cheeks Morgan, Isabel Cheeks Lewis, Thomas Kelly, Margaret Greene McClain and James Cheeks. Many of his other descendants have graduated from other colleges.

== Autobiography ==
With his daughter, Carrie Burns, he wrote an autobiography, A Slave's Adventures Toward Freedom; Not Fiction, but the True Story of a Struggle. Bruner states in the introduction:

In this book I have given the actual experiences of my own life. I thought in putting it in this form it might be of some inspiration to struggling men and women. In this great, free land of ours, every person, no matter how humble or how great seems the handicap, by industry and saving, can reach a position of independence and be of service to mankind.

== Slave Narrative Collection ==
In 1936, Bruner was interviewed for the Works Progress Administration Slave Narrative Collection. The interview did not reveal the same level of detail as his book. He left out personal information and did not delve into the more complex natures of individuals and the communities in which he lived. Blassingame theorizes that some of this may be due to memory loss, transcription errors, or concealment of some of the facts. The WPA interview resulted in a couple of typed pages; Bruner's book was 54 pages in length.

== Death ==
Peter Bruner died on April 6, 1938, and is one of the African-American Civil War Veterans buried in Woodside Cemetery, Oxford, Ohio.

== Honors ==
- Exhibit at The Blue Grass Heritage Museum in the Agriculture Room, Winchester, Kentucky.
- Listed as a Notable Kentucky African American by the University of Kentucky Libraries.
- Peter Bruner's autobiography included in the "entries in print edition" of the African American National Biography published in January 2008 as a joint project of the W. E. B. Du Bois Institute for African and African American Research at Harvard University and Oxford University Press.
- "Peter Bruner: An Informal Discussion of His Life and Times." Presented by Blake Vaughan at McGuffey Museum in Oxford, Ohio, on February 24, 2009.
