= Elijah P. Marrs =

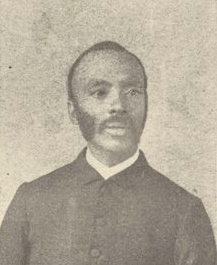
- Marrs in 1915
- Born: January , 1840; Shelby County, Kentucky
- Died: August 30, 1910 (aged 70); Louisville, Kentucky, United States
- Occupations: Educator, minister (Christianity)
- Political party: Republican

Religious life
- Religion: Baptist
- Military career
- Allegiance: United States of America
- Branch: United States Army
- Service years: 1864-1866
- Rank: Sergeant Major
- Units: 12th Regiment Heavy Artillery U.S. Colored Troops, Company L

Elijah P. Marrs (January 1840 – August 30, 1910) was a minister and educator in Louisville, Kentucky. He was a sergeant in the 12th Regiment Heavy Artillery U.S. Colored Troops during the American Civil War (1861–1865). After the war he taught in various schools and helped organize Loyal Leagues to defend blacks from attacks by the Ku Klux Klan. Together with his brother, Henry, he helped found what became Simmons College of Kentucky in Louisville in 1879.

== Early life ==
Elijah P. Marrs was born a slave in January 1840 in Shelby County, Kentucky to Andrews and Frances Marrs. His father, Andrew, had been granted his freedom by his master before Elijah was born, but his mother was still a slave, and with her sons was owned by a man named Jesse Robinson. His parents were born in Culpeper County, Virginia. He had one brother, Henry C. Marrs. He converted to the Baptist religion at the age of eleven by Rev. Charles Wells and received basic education studying at night under Ham Graves, a black man, and later at Sunday schools. Marrs picked up on Graves' ability to teach and began teaching fellow slaves how to read as well. This passion for teaching and helping others continued even when the American Civil War (1861–1865) started, Marrs read newspapers to other slaves, keeping people informed about the wars progress.

== Civil War ==
On September 25, 1864, Marrs organized a company of 27 men, armed with clubs, and Marrs armed himself with a broken pistol, and they marched 22 miles to Louisville and enlisted in the United States army. Soon after, he was made sergeant of Company L of the 12th Regiment Heavy Artillery U.S. Colored Troops. He may have been initially assigned to another regiment, but was transferred and promoted when it was discovered he was literate. He temporarily held the position of regimental quartermaster sergeant. His brother, Henry, became orderly sergeant and then sergeant major in another company, in company C of the 5th United States Colored Cavalry. His regiment trained at Camp Nelson, Kentucky and took part in minor engagements at Glasgow and at Big Springs in Kentucky in 1865. With the permission of his captain, Marrs and another soldier, Swift Johnson, led prayer meetings in the barracks while the regiment was stationed in Bowling Green. While serving at Camp Nelson, Marrs started a relationship with a woman named Emma, who later died in a refugee camp.

His enlistment lasted into 1866, however, while home on furlough in 1864 he was attacked by a mob of Confederate sympathizers in the streets of Shelbyville, Kentucky while walking with his mother . He had managed to disperse his assailants, first holding off attackers with a stick, and later when Marrs got home, with his pistol. A few nights later, he again brandished his gun to defend himself and his girlfriend. He was discharged on April 24, 1866.

== Career ==
On August 3, 1871, he married Julia Gray of Shelbyville, Kentucky, outside of the Shelby County Baptist Church. Julia died in April 1876.

After the war, Elijah and Henry formed a partnership consisting of a drayage business and a farm. In September 1866, Marrs was hired as the first African American to teach at a school in Simpsonville. His efforts in creating Simpsonville history did not end there, he also established the first colored agriculture and mechanical fair in Simpsonville and the surrounding Logan counties. Marrs also taught at schools in LaGrange, New Castle, and Louisville. An important part of his work was fundraising. He played a role in various Loyal Leagues organized for protection of blacks against attacks by the Ku Klux Klan and himself fended off numerous attacks. When he wasn't stopping present physical attacks, he was working to halt racist bills from reaching ratification in his community, such as the 'whipping post bill", which would have seen the return of a whipping post as a punishment for African Americans. He was secretary of the Loyal League in Lagrange organized by W. L. Yancey in 1869. While at New Castle in 1871, Marrs helped organize a Henry County Loyal League. In his autobiography, Marrs states that he "slept with a pistol under my head, an Enfield rifle at my side, and a corn knife at the door".

Marrs also joined the Baptist clergy. On June 16, 1873, he was licensed to preach at the New Castle Baptist Church and he was ordained August 22, 1875.

Marrs participated in a number of conventions and organizations in Kentucky. He was a delegate to the first educational convention held in Kentucky in 1868 and the 15th Amendment political convention in 1869. At that convention he was on the committee on resolutions. He was a member of the Republican party and attended the convention which nominated John Marshal Harlan for governor in 1871. Furthermore, Marrs was the first African American to become the President of the Republican Club of Oldham County, showing that Marrs was not only an avid participant in the political sphere of his community, but also a leader. In fall 1874, Marrs taught at Roger Williams University in Nashville, Tennessee. In 1875, he was elected to the position of messenger of the General Association of Kentucky Baptists.

In 1879, he and Henry co-founded Simmons College of Kentucky. Henry started the effort and convinced Elijah to join. Elijah served as the first president and Henry was principal, but these roles were in flux, and in 1879 and 1880, he also served as business manager. The school opened on November 24, 1879. The pair felt they were not qualified for the work, and when they and the trustees heard William J. Simmons speak at the school in June 1880, Simmons was offered the position of president and assumed the position in September 1880.

Later in his career, he continued to be involved in statewide and national organizations. He was a member of the State Convention of Colored Men in Lexington in 1882 and of the National Convention of Colored Men in Louisville in 1883. He was also a member of a large education convention in Frankfort, Kentucky in 1884. He was a member of the executive board and treasurer of the General Association of Colored Baptists for six years. He was member and secretary of the executive board of the Central District Association.

On March 16, 1880, he became pastor of the Beargrass Baptist Church which he helped found. In 1881 he served as pastor of St. John Baptist Church in Louisville, and served there as well as at Beargrass until his death.

Marrs died on August 30, 1910. He was buried in Greenwood Cemetery.

== Bibliography ==
- Marrs, Elijah P. Life and History of the Rev. Elijah P. Marrs. The Bradley & Gilbert Company, Louisville, Kentucky (1885). accessed October 28, 2016 at http://docsouth.unc.edu/neh/marrs/marrs.html
- Lucas, Marion Brunson. A history of Blacks in Kentucky: From slavery to segregation, 1760-1891. Vol. 1. University Press of Kentucky, 2003.
