= 12th United States Colored Heavy Artillery Regiment =

12th Regiment Heavy Artillery U.S. Colored Troops
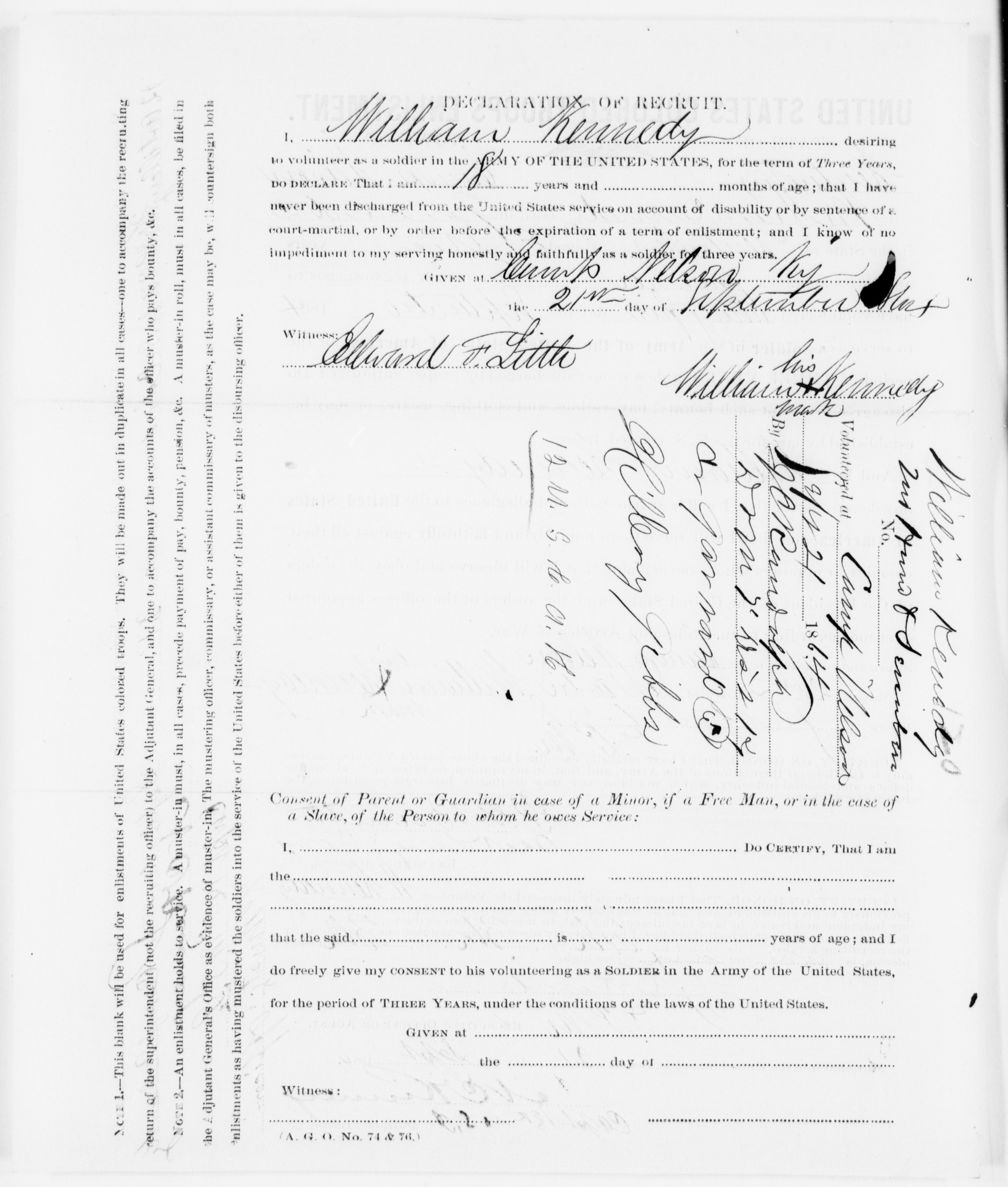
- 1864 enlistment by 18yo William Kennedy
- Active: July 15, 1864 - April 24, 1866
- Country: United States
- Branch: Union Army
- Type: Artillery
- Size: Regiment
- Part of: United States Colored Troops
- Engagements: American Civil War

The 12th Regiment Heavy Artillery U.S. Colored Troops was formed at Camp Nelson, Kentucky. It was one of 175 regiments of African American men during the Civil War.

== Overview ==
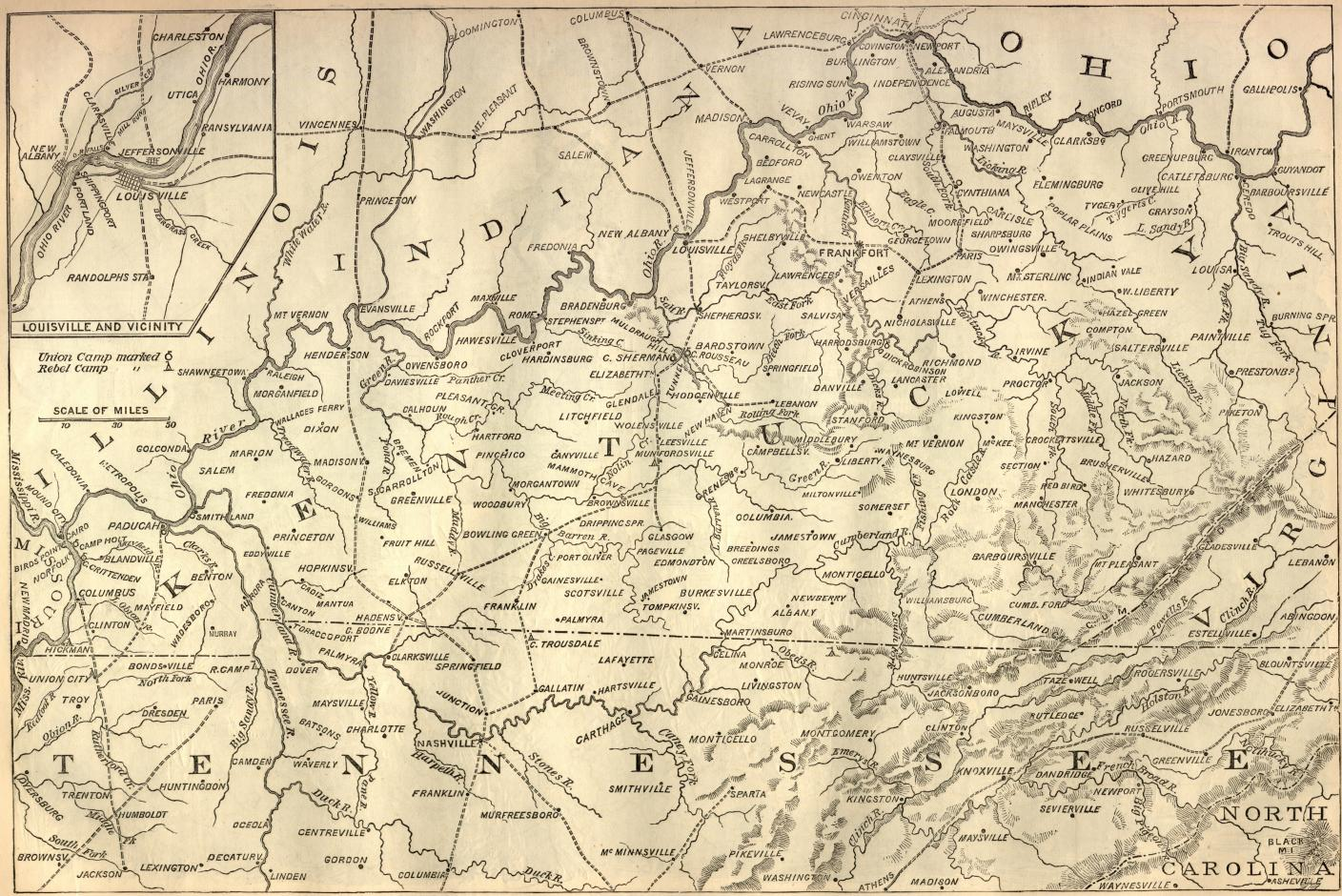
Civil War battle map of Kentucky, published in Harper's Weekly October 19, 1861

During the Civil War, Kentucky, was the last state to accept African American men into their army. In February 1864 there were 400 men who wanted to enlist and Col. Andrew H. Clark began enlisted the men. By June of that year there were 1,500 enlisted colored soldiers. June 13, 1864, restrictions were lifted requiring men to be free or have their owner's written permission to engage in the war; From that point forward anyone that enlisted was emancipated.

The 12th Regiment Heavy Artillery U.S. Colored Troops was organized on July 15, 1864, at Camp Nelson. Until January 1865 it was attached to the 2nd Brigade, 1st Division, District of Kentucky, Dept. of the Ohio. It was then attached to the Military District of Kentucky and Dept. of Kentucky, to April, 1866. The regiment was responsible for garrison duty at Bowling Green, Camp Nelson and other points until April, 1866. It mustered out April 24, 1866.

It was the largest regiment that was organized at Camp Nelson. From June 1864 through April 1865 there were a total of 1,418 men enlisted. In one day there were 322 men who enlisted. Camp Nelson became the third largest recruiting and training center for African American men: More than 10,000 African American men were recruited at Camp Nelson.

Information about the regiment has been published in Peter Bruner's A Slave's Adventures Toward Freedom and the memoir of Elijah P. Marrs, a sergeant in company L. Hasan Davis' Angus Augustus Burleigh: The Long Climb to Freedom (1997) is a stage performance about A. A. Burleigh's life, a sergeant in company G.

== See also ==
- List of United States Colored Troops Civil War Units
