= Douglass Park (Lexington, Kentucky) =

Park established for African Americans in Louisville, Kentucky

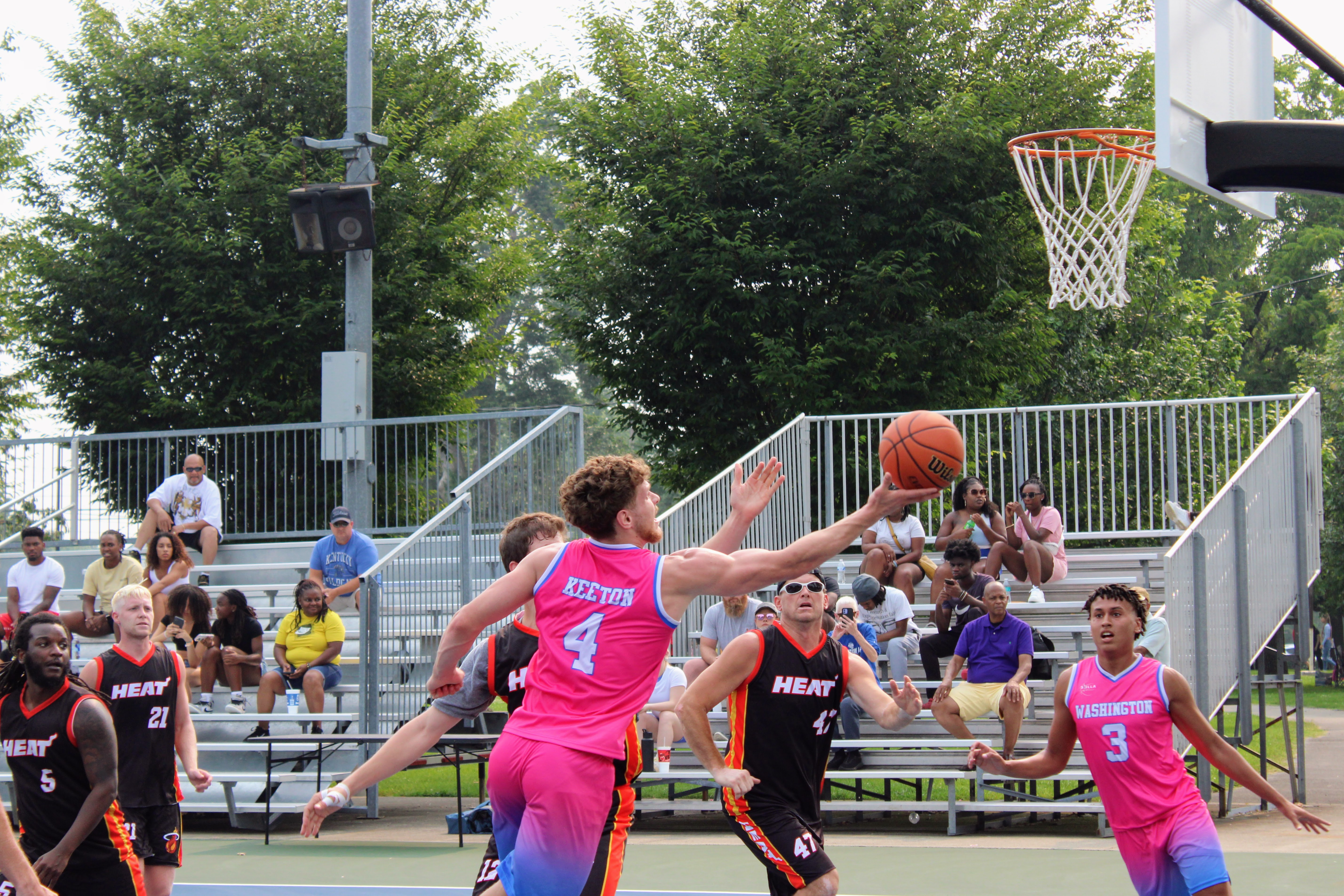
- The 2023 Dirt Bowl at Douglass Park
- Interactive map of Douglass Park
- Type: Public park
- Location: Lexington, Kentucky, U.S.
- Coordinates: 38.06865°N 84.50295°W
- Opened: July 4, 1916
- Etymology: Frederick Douglass

Frederick Douglass Park, also known as Douglass Park, is a city park established in 1916 for African Americans in the Georgetown Street neighborhood of Lexington, Kentucky. It contains a pool that opened in 1939, and was renovated in 2025.

The park opened in 1916 and a dedication ceremony was held July 4. It is at the city's far western end which made it fairly inaccessible to people from other neighborhoods when it opened. It was the first park for African Americans in the city. Jordan Carlisle Jackson Jr. served as the chairman of the committee behind the creation of Douglass Park.

In 1918 Mrs. Lee Christie was designated matron of Douglass Park. Willie Williams coached baseball at the park. The Dirt Bowl summer basketball tournament was played in Louisville and in Lexington at Douglass Park.
