= New Zion Historic District =

Historic district in Kentucky, United States

- U.S. National Register of Historic Places
- Location within Kentucky Location within the United States
- Location: border of Fayette County, Kentucky and Scott County, Kentucky
- Nearest city: Scott, Kentucky
- Coordinates: 38.17897°N 84.48637°W
- Area: 37 acres (15 ha)
- Built: 1872
- Architectural style: Bungalow/craftsman, Shotgun and single pen
- NRHP reference No.: 08001118
- Added to NRHP: December 4, 2008

The New Zion Historic District, near Scott, Kentucky, is a 37 acres (15 ha) historic district which was listed on the National Register of Historic Places in 2008. It included 27 contributing buildings, one contributing structure, and 10 contributing sites.

In 2008, New Zion was one of few still predominantly an African American community.

== History ==
New Zion "stood where 'land was apparently given to two ex slaves, Promis King (or Primus Keene) and Calvin Hampton (or Calvin Hamilton), by a Mr. Gough (or Gulf, or Goult). Hampton and King later sold lots to other Negroes."

New Zion was founded under the name Briar Hill, Kentucky. It was developed, starting around 1868, along Newtown Pike and along New Zion Road, a U-shaped road with two entrances off of Newtown Pike. It includes 4972 Newtown Pike through 5200 Newtown Pike, and 103-135 New Zion Rd. It spans the border of Fayette County, Kentucky and Scott County, Kentucky.

It includes bungalow/craftsman, shotgun and single pen architecture.

It is significant as "New Zion is a rare town among the several dozen African American communities studied in central Kentucky in the early 1970s—it survives, and its historic aspects are recognizable." About 30 rural Negro settlements or hamlets having more than 50 residences were studied in Peter Craig Smith's 1972 dissertation, Negro Hamlets and Gentlemen Farms: A Dichotomous Rural Settlement Pattern in Kentucky's Bluegrass Region (University of Kentucky).
