= John Gregg Fee =

American abolitionist (1816–1901)

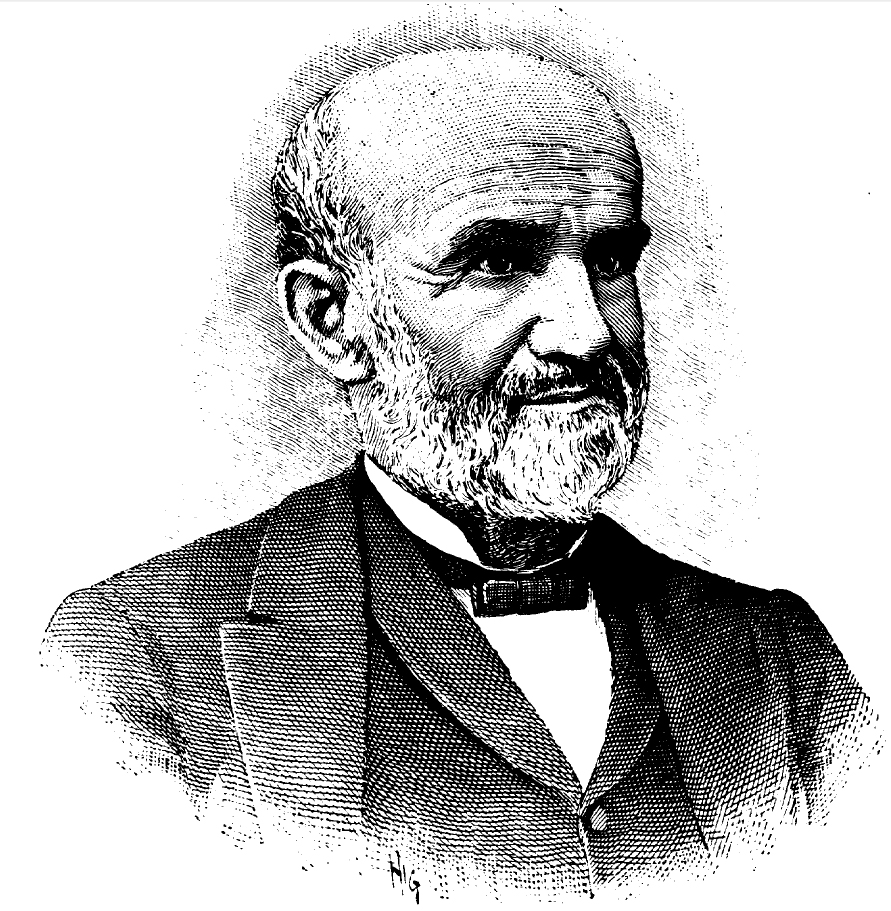
- Born: September 9, 1816; Bracken County, Kentucky, United States
- Died: January 11, 1901 (aged 84)
- Education: Augusta College; Miami University; Lane Theological Seminary
- Occupations: Minister, educator, Berea College (founder)
- Spouse: Matilda Hamilton
- Children: Laura Ann Embree, Burritt Fee, Howard Samuel Fee, Tappen Fee, Edwin Sumner Fee, and Bessie Hamilton Fee
- Parent(s): John Fee Jr. and Sarah (Gregg) Fee

John Gregg Fee (September 9, 1816 – January 11, 1901) was an abolitionist, minister and educator, as well as the founder of the town of Berea, Kentucky. He established The Church of Christ, the Union church in Berea (1853), Berea College (1855), the first in the U.S. South with interracial and coeducational admissions, and late in his life, he founded another congregation that would become the First Christian Church (Disciples of Christ), two blocks from his first. (1890). During the American Civil War, Fee worked at Camp Nelson to have facilities constructed to support freedmen and their families, and to provide them with education and preaching. The camp was also where the formerly enslaved men who had joined the Union Army were taken to be mustered out in the last years of the Civil War.

== Early life and education ==
Fee was born in Bracken County, Kentucky, on September 9, 1816, the son of John Fee Jr., of Irish and Scots descent, and Sarah (Gregg) Fee, of Irish and English descent. His father inherited a bondsman who reached the term of his indenture. He then began to buy slaves, finally holding thirteen. Later he recognized more of its problems and invested in lands in free states, but held on to his slaves throughout his life and opposed his son's abolitionism.

Following a conversion to the Christian faith at age 14, John Fee Jr. wanted to join the Methodist Episcopal Church. His father encouraged him to wait, and a couple of years later they both joined the Presbyterian Church. He studied at Augusta College in Bracken County, Kentucky, and Miami University in Oxford, Ohio. He then entered Lane Seminary in Cincinnati, Ohio in 1842, where in studying for the ministry, he made lifelong friendships. The young Fee became a staunch abolitionist, vowing to "Love thy neighbor as thyself."

== Career ==
After his conversion, Fee returned to Kentucky at his father's command: "Bundle up your books and come home. I have spent the last dollar I mean to spend on you in a free state".

In Kentucky, Fee preached against slavery, but found it difficult to find a permanent position, due to widespread pro-slavery sentiment. He started in Lewis County, which had fewer slaveholders, so more people who supported his point of view. In the 1840s, he came into conflict with the Presbyterian Synod of Kentucky, which opposed his church's stance to refuse fellowship to slaveholders.

Fee left the Presbyterian Church over this matter and came to believe that Christianity had to be non-denominational and non-sectarian. He began writing about abolition, and some of his work was published by the American Missionary Association (AMA), established in 1846. By 1848 the AMA commissioned Fee as an itinerant preacher in Bracken and Lewis counties. In Lewis County, he and parishioners built a Free Church of Christ.

With a land donation from Cassius M. Clay, a wealthy landowner who supported the church and gradual abolition, in 1853 Fee founded the town of Berea, Kentucky in the interior of the state in Madison County. Like-minded people began to gather there. He preached in neighboring counties, often running into violent opposition to his anti-slavery views. His autobiography is filled with his accounts the volatility of the decade before the war, when he was often challenged and threatened because of his stand on abolition and equal treatment of black people.

In 1855 with other members of Union Church, Fee founded Berea College, the first college in the state that was interracial and coeducational. It began as a one-room schoolhouse, which also served as their local church building. He modeled the school on Oberlin College of Ohio and hired some teachers from there, including the man who became the school's star educator, John Almanza Rowley Rogers. There was great interest in the college, as small as it was, especially since there had not previously been a school in the area.

In the beginning, the students were all white, although from a mix of classes: some came from the upper class, while others were the children of hill folk. A third of them were the children of slave holders. The school grew quickly: it had 15 students in the spring of 1858, 45 for the fall of that year, and over a hundred the following spring.

J.A.R Rogers, who acted as principle, wanted to make the school interracial, and convinced Fee to go along by threatening to quit and take the students with him. In April 1859, an election was held between two slates for the school's Board of Trustees, one supporting the integrated school, and the other opposed. The former won by a ratio of 3 to 1.

Fee, Rogers, and other supporters drew up a constitution for the school, and pledged their own support with more than 100 acres (0.40 km^{2}) of land for the college's campus.

In 1859 Fee took his family to Boston, Massachusetts, where he attended the AMA Convention and did fund-raising for the school. Abolitionists also encouraged him to seek help from Henry Ward Beecher's church in Brooklyn, New York. Abolitionists and supporters of education created a broad national network that sustained such progressive efforts. Word of Fee's seeking help from Beecher made the news in Kentucky, in a distorted fashion, and stirred up pro-slavery sentiment against him. It was especially Fee's statement from the pulpit, asking that the North send more people like John Brown south, "not to carry the Sword, but to carry the Gospel of Love" which riled up southeners still nervous from Brown's raid on Harpers Ferry, which had only recently taken place. This strategic error on Fee's part doomed his anti-slavery efforts in Kentucky.

In December 1859 a band of armed pro-slavery men came to Berea while Fee was still away in the East. They delivered notice to J.A.R. Rogers and others to leave the state within 10 days, because of the group's opposition to Fee, their church and college. Although the Feeites appealed to Kentucky Governor Beriah Magoffin for protection, he said he was unable to do so. For a time, townspeople abandoned the village and school. Abolitionists were expelled from Lewis and Bracken counties as well. After Fee's return to Bracken County, where he and his family were staying with his in-laws, a committee of 62 men of "high standing" told Fee he and his supporters had to leave Bracken County.

Fee lived with his family in exile in Cincinnati, Ohio, until 1864. Although they tried to return to Berea before that, violent opposition to Fee and abolitionists forced them out of state again. Matilda Fee had returned to their house in Berea with two of their children without much incident, although both Union and Confederate troops were in the area. Fee was unable to get through to her, so she had to get back to Cincinnati.

In 1864 Fee and his wife returned to Berea. He soon was going frequently to Camp Nelson, where he became involved with preaching and teaching former slaves, who were being enlisted for military service in the Union Army. Their wives and children also came to the camp. Fee worked with the camp commandant and quartermaster on arrangements for a school, and urged building facilities for the families. He appealed to Salmon Chase, now with the national government, for funding, which was quickly approved. Barracks, a hospital and school buildings were constructed at Camp Nelson. Fee helped arrange for teachers for the freedmen and was closely involved in operations until after the end of the war. He and his wife used their own funds to help buy land in the area to be allocated as home lots, as well as raising a church and school near there.

After the war, Fee and Rogers returned with their families to Berea. For years, Fee had been determinedly non-sectarian. When the AMA became aligned with the Congregational Church in 1865, Fee felt that he no longer could accept their aid, as he believed the AMA, like other sects or denominations, would divide the people of the South. In later years, Fee and others went on to establish the Christian Missionary Association of Kentucky, made up of individuals rather than churches. He also devoted his efforts to Berea College, which grew after the war. The school accepted freedmen and women, and expanded from its one room. In 1873, it awarded its first college degree.

While headed the Board of Trustees, J.A.R. Rogers was principal of the school from 1858 to 1869. After the war, Fee recruited additional teachers from Oberlin College.

Starting in the late 19th century, president William Goodell Frost recognized the need for education among people in Appalachia and started the school's commitment to that region.

Fee died January 9, 1901.

== Marriage and family ==
Fee married Matilda Hamilton on 26 September 1844. She was also from Bracken County, they had known each other since they were young, and she supported his strong abolitionism. They had several children, some of whom died in childhood.

== Legacy ==
In 2016 Fee was inducted into the National Abolition Hall of Fame, Peterboro, New York.

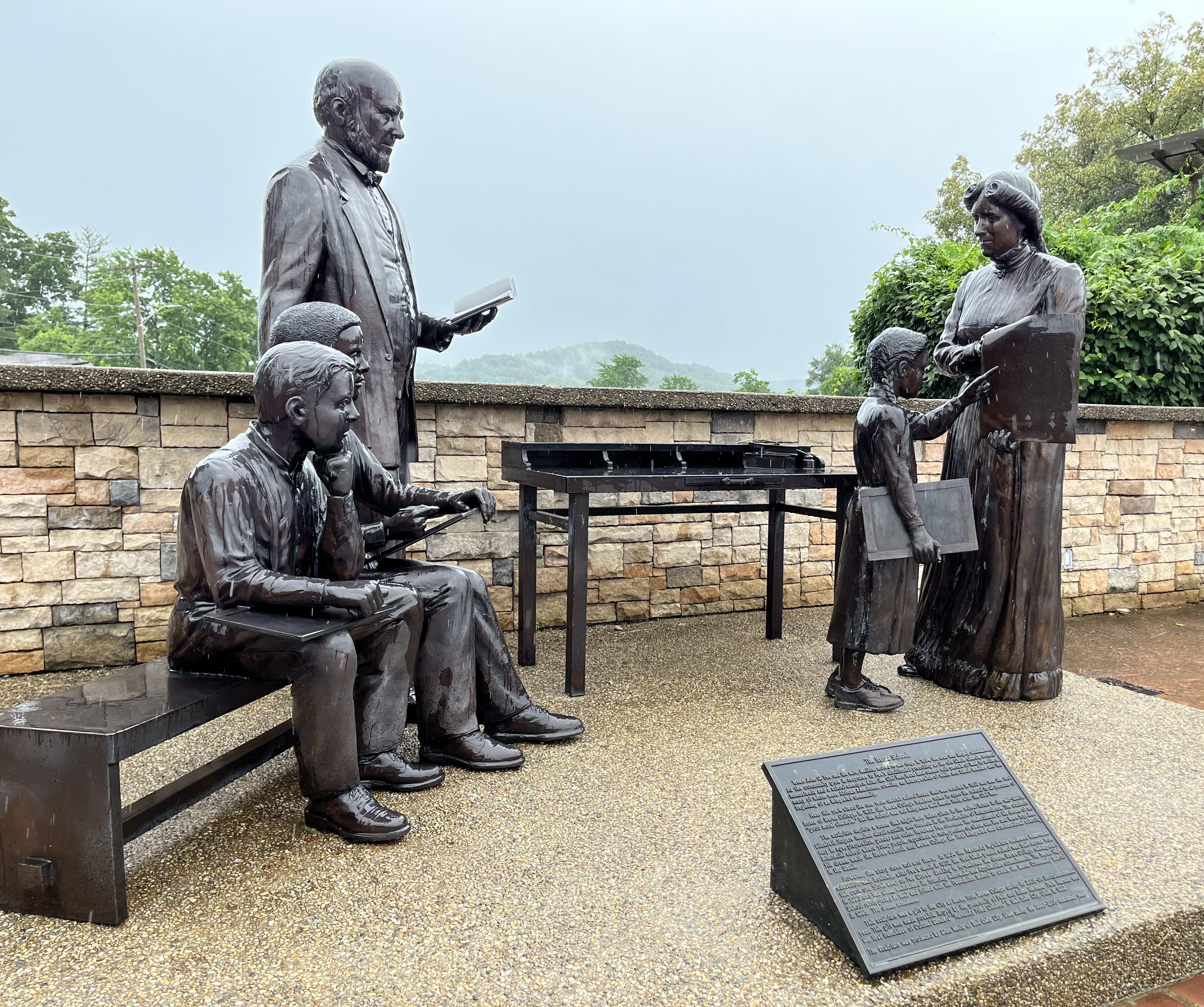
John G. Fee holds a Bible, and Elizabeth Rogers, the school's first teacher, shows the Declaration of Independence to three children.

In honor of its 150th anniversary in 2005, the college gifted a sculpture park to the city. Portrayed are Fee and the school's first teacher Elizabeth Rogers. Fee holds a Bible, and Rogers holds the Declaration of Independence, showing it to an African American boy and girl and a white boy. Located at the site of the college's first building, the pathway includes some of the original brickwork.
