= African American Civil War Memorial Museum =

Memorial and Museum in Washington, DC

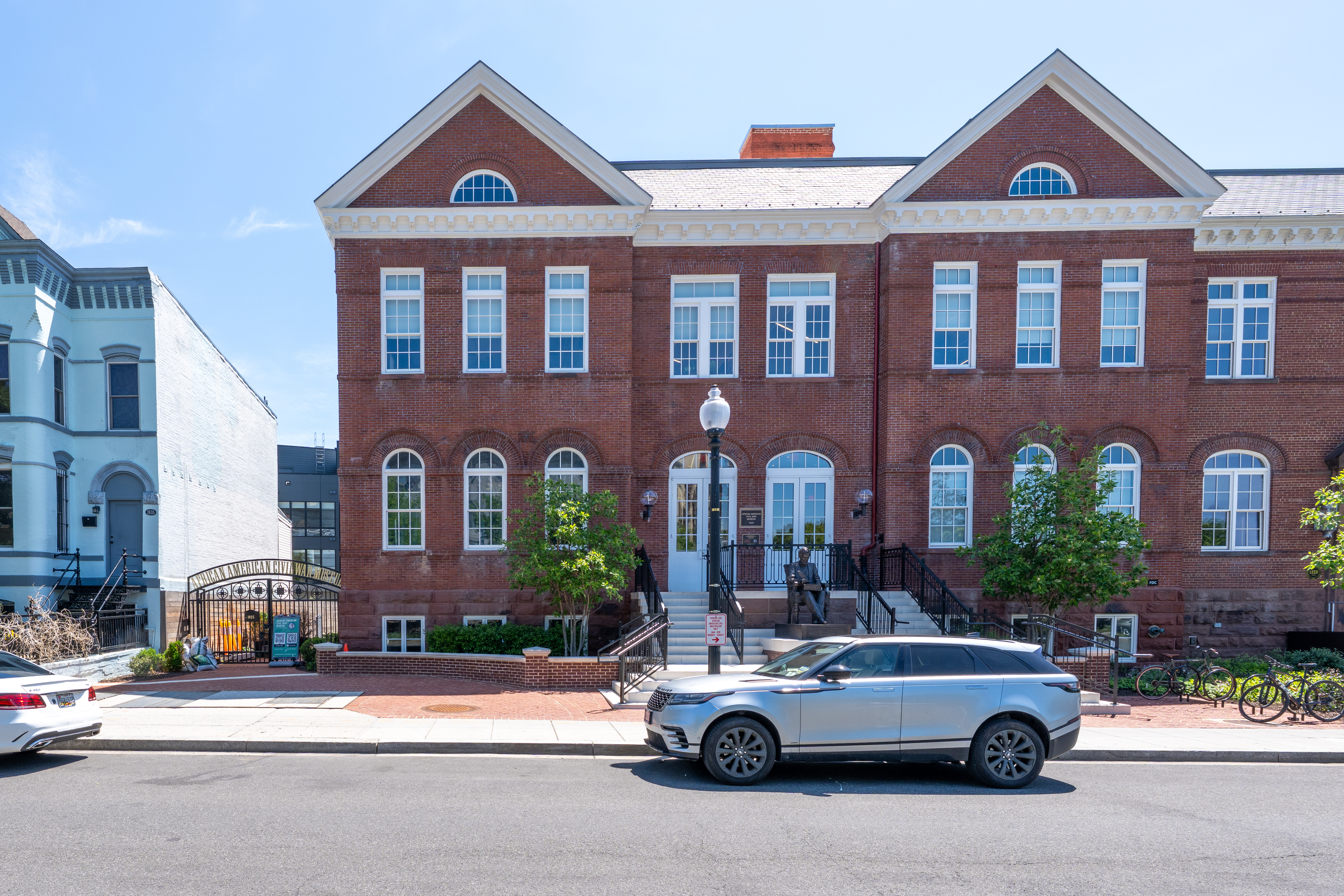

- Location within Washington, D.C. Location within the United States
- Location: 1925 Vermont Avenue NW; Washington, D.C. 20011 U.S.
- Coordinates: 38°54′59″N 77°1′33″W
- Established: October 27, 2004
- Governing body: National Park Service
- Website: www.nps.gov/afam/index.htm

The African American Civil War Memorial Museum, in the U Street district of Washington, D.C., recognizes the contributions of the United States Colored Troops (USCT). The site consists of a 9-foot bronze statue entitled The Spirit of Freedom by sculptor Ed Hamilton of Louisville, Kentucky, and indoor exhibits at the historic Grimke School, named after Archibald Grimke.

The eponymous memorial, dedicated in July 1998 by the African American Civil War Memorial Freedom Foundation, commemorates the service of 209,145 African-American soldiers and about 7,000 white and 2,145 Hispanic soldiers, together with the approximate 20,000 unsegregated Navy sailors, who fought for the Union in the American Civil War, mostly among the 175 regiments of United States Colored Troops. The Memorial is located at the corner of Vermont Avenue, 10th Street, and U Street NW in Washington, D.C. The statue was commissioned by the DC Commission on the Arts and Humanities in 1993, completed in 1997, and dedicated in 1998. The memorial includes a public walking area with curved panel short walls inscribed with the names of the men who served in the war.

The Museum was originally across the street from the Memorial, at 1925 Vermont Ave. NW, but was moved to the former Grimke School at 1923 Vermont Ave. NW in 2018. The Museum is planned to be housed in the former gymnasium of the school, which was converted into an office building in the 1980s. The rest of the campus has been slated for mixed use including housing.

Both are served by the U Street station on the Washington Metro, served by the Green Line.

== History ==
=== The memorial ===
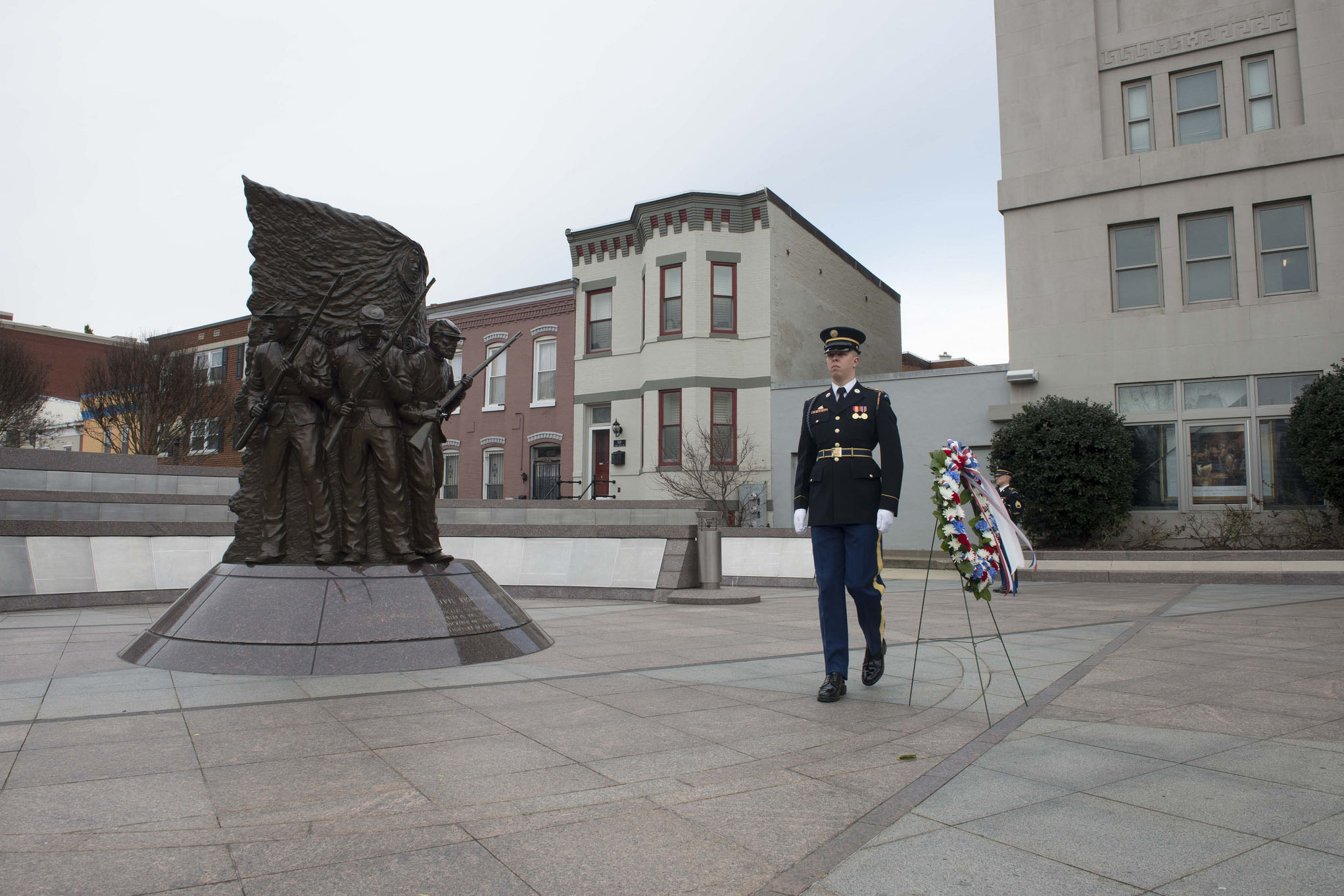
The bronze statue by Ed Hamilton

The memorial was developed by the African American Civil War Memorial Freedom Foundation and Museum. It was transferred to the National Park Service (NPS) on October 27, 2004. The National Mall and Memorial Parks office of the NPS now manages the site.

=== The museum ===
The African American Civil War Museum is located directly across from the memorial at 1925 Vermont Avenue. From July 16–18, 2011, it celebrated its grand opening in a new facility, with a weekend of speakers and events devoted to racial reconciliation. It planned four years of activities to commemorate the 150th anniversary of the war and African-American contributions.

The museum opened in January 1999 in a building two blocks west of the memorial in the historic U Street Corridor, a neighborhood traditionally the heart of African-American entertainment and theater in Washington. The museum enables visitors, researchers, and descendants of the United States Colored Troops to better understand their stories. It displays photographs, newspaper articles, and replicas of period clothing, and uniforms and weaponry of the Civil War.

The African American Civil War Memorial Registry at the museum documents the family trees of more than 2,000 descendants of those men who served with the USCT. Other descendants may register. Visitors can easily search the database to find ancestors and relatives registered in the Descendants Registry.

== Notable people ==
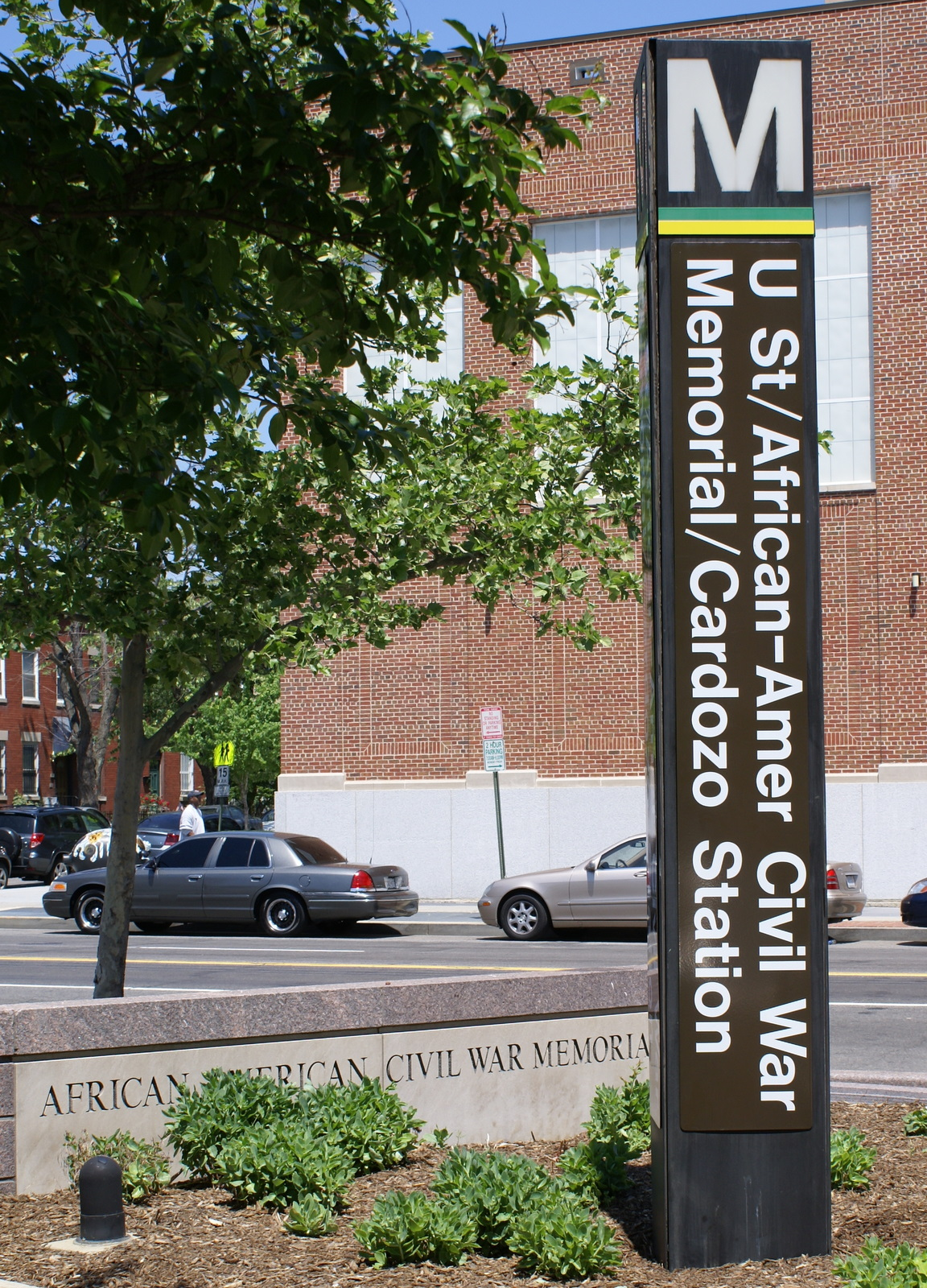
A WMATA metro station near the memorial

A number of men have had their service and lives noted. Among the nearly 220,000 names here are some whose service and lives have been documented. Many earned a Medal of Honor, the highest and most prestigious personal military decoration that may be awarded to recognize U.S. military service members who distinguished themselves by acts of valor, during their service in a black regiment during the war. Additionally many earned a brevet promotion which was a warrant giving a commissioned officer a higher rank title as a reward for gallantry or meritorious conduct, but without conferring the authority, precedence, or pay of real rank.

- George E. Albee (January 27, 1845 – March 24, 1918) was a lieutenant in the 36th United States Colored Infantry.
- Samuel C. Armstrong (January 30, 1839 – May 11, 1893, in Maui, Hawaii) Commanded union black soldiers in the civil war, established Hampton University 1868. Served as a lieutenant colonel assigned to the 9th United States Colored Infantry and then command of the 8th United States Colored Troops.
- John F. Appleton (August 29, 1838 – August 31, 1870) had command of the 81st Regiment Infantry U.S. Colored Troops.
- William H. Appleton (March 24, 1843 – September 9, 1912) served in the 4th United States Colored Infantry and received the Medal of Honor for service during the war.
- Alexander Thomas Augusta (March 8, 1825 – December 21, 1890) was a Regimental Surgeon of the 7th United States Colored Troops.
- William H. Barnes (c. 1840 or 1845 – December 24, 1866) served in the 38th United States Colored Infantry and received the Medal of Honor for service during the war.
- Charles L. Barrell (August 1, 1842 – April 18, 1914) served in the 102nd Regiment United States Colored Troops as a flag holder, attained the rank of first lieutenant, and received the Medal of Honor for service during the war.
- Jesse T. Barrick (January 18, 1841 – November 3, 1923) served in the 57th United States Colored Infantry and received the Medal of Honor for service during the war.
- Powhatan Beaty (October 8, 1837 – December 6, 1916) served in the 5th United States Colored Infantry and received the Medal of Honor for service during the war.
- Orson W. Bennett (November 17, 1841 – January 8, 1904) served in the 102nd Regiment United States Colored Troops and received the Medal of Honor for service during the war.
- Frederick Benteen (August 24, 1834 – June 22, 1898) served in the 138th United States Colored Volunteers and was given awards for his service during the war.
- William Birney (May 28, 1819 – August 14, 1907) was a colonel of the 22nd United States Colored Troops and then with the 3rd Division of the X Corps and given awards for his service during the war.
- Lionel F. Booth was a commander of the 6th United States Regiment Colored Heavy Artillery and was killed in action on April 12, 1864, at the Battle of Fort Pillow.
- Felix Brannigan (1844 – June 10, 1907) was officer in the 103rd United States Colored Infantry and received the Medal of Honor for service during the war.
- James H. Bronson (1838 – March 16, 1884) served in the 5th U.S. Colored Infantry Regiment, rose to the rank of first sergeant, and received the Medal of Honor for service during the war.
- Peter Bruner (1845 – April 6, 1938) escaped slavery and served in the 12th Regiment Heavy Artillery United States Colored Troops.
- George W. Brush (October 4, 1842 – November 18, 1927) served in the 34th Infantry Regiment United States Colored Troops and received the Medal of Honor for service during the war.
- Edward Lyon Buchwalter (June 1, 1841 – October 4, 1933) served as captain of the 53rd Mississippi Colored Volunteers Infantry
- Louis H. Carpenter (February 11, 1839 – January 21, 1916) served as commander in the 5th United States Colored Cavalry.
- Peter J. Carter (May 29, 1845 – July 19, 1886) served in the 10th United States Colored Infantry.
- Thornton Chase (February 22, 1847 – September 30, 1912) served as first lieutenant of 26th Regiment Infantry U.S. Colored Troops and then as a captain in the 104th United States Colored Infantry.
- Emmet Crawford (December 22, 1844 – January 18, 1886) served in the 13th United States Colored Artillery at the end of the war.
- Samuel J. Crawford (April 10, 1835 – October 21, 1913) served as colonel of the 2nd Regiment Kansas Volunteer Infantry (Colored).
- Andrew Davidson (February 12, 1840 – November 10, 1902) served with the 30th United States Colored Troops where he was promoted to first lieutenant and later regimental adjutant and received the Medal of Honor for service during the war.
- Hasbrouck Davis (April 19, 1827 – October 19, 1870) and served with the 3rd Regiment Cavalry United States Colored Troops.
- Martin Delany (May 6, 1812 – January 24, 1885) was commissioned as a major, the first black line field officer in the war and achieving the highest rank an African American during the war.
- Charles DeRudio (August 26, 1832 – November 1, 1910) served as second lieutenant in the 2nd United States Colored Infantry.
- Joel Dewey (September 20, 1840 – June 17, 1873) served as lieutenant colonel of the 111th United States Colored Infantry.
- John Eaton (December 5, 1829 – February 9, 1906) served in the 63rd United States Colored Infantry and rose to brevet brigadier general.
- Alonzo J. Edgerton (June 7, 1827 – August 9, 1896) served as colonel of the 67th Regiment Infantry United States Colored Troops and rose to the rank of a brigadier general.
- Nathan H. Edgerton (August 28, 1839 – October 27, 1932) was commissioned a first lieutenant in the 6th United States Colored Infantry and became the adjutant of the unit.
- Ira Hobart Evans (April 11, 1844 – April 19, 1922) was commissioned as a first lieutenant in the 9th United States Colored Troops. In January, 1865 he was promoted to captain in the 116th United States Colored Troops, promoted to brevet major and assigned as assistant Adjutant of the XXV Army Corps, Army of the James. He received the Medal of Honor for service during the war.
- Bernard Gaines Farrar Jr (1831–1916) served with the 6th United States Colored Heavy Artillery.
- Berthold Fernow (November 28, 1837 – March 3, 1908) served as lieutenant of the 3rd United States Colored Infantry Regiment.
- Christian Fleetwood (July 21, 1840 – September 28, 1914) was commissioned as sergeant the 4th Regiment United States Colored Infantry and rose to sergeant major.
- James Daniel Gardner (September 16, 1839 – September 29, 1905) served in the 36th Regiment United States Colored Troops and received the Medal of Honor for service during the war.
- Gordon or "Whipped Peter" escaped slavery and served in one of many Louisiana Union Civil War units.
- Adolphus Greely (March 27, 1844 – October 20, 1935) commissioned as a 2nd lieutenant in the 81st United States Colored Infantry, promoted to 1st lieutenant and then captain.
- Henry M. Hardenbergh (c. 1843 – August 28, 1865) earned a lieutenant's commission in the 36th United States Colored Troops during the war and received the Medal of Honor for service during the war.
- James H. Harris (1828 – January 28, 1898) served in the 38th United States Colored Troops quickly promoted and then sergeant and received the Medal of Honor for service during the war.
- Llewellyn F. Haskell (October 8, 1842 – November 26, 1929) was commissioned as lieutenant colonel of the 7th United States Colored Infantry and later promoted to the command of the 41st United States Colored Infantry.
- Thomas R. Hawkins (1840 – February 28, 1870) rose to the rank of sergeant major of the 6th United States Colored Infantry and received the Medal of Honor for service during the war.
- Alfred B. Hilton (1842 – October 21, 1864) served with the 4th Regiment United States Colored Infantry and posthumously received the Medal of Honor for service during the war.
- Edward Winslow Hinks (May 30, 1830 – February 14, 1894) served as a commander in the XVIII Corps.
- Milton M. Holland (August 1, 1844 – May 15, 1910) initially as the serving as a sergeant major of the 5th United States Colored Infantry and received the Medal of Honor for service during the war.
- Charles Henry Howard (August 28, 1838 – January 27, 1908) commanding the United States Colored Troops training camp at Beaufort, South Carolina, as well as the 128th United States Colored Infantry, and was promoted to brevet brigadier general
- Joshua B. Howell (September 11, 1806 – September 14, 1864) serving in the XVIII and X Corps, died during battle and was posthumously promoted to brigadier general.
- Miles James (1829 – August 28, 1871) serving as corporal in the 36th United States Colored Troops, and received the Medal of Honor for service during the war.
- J. R. Kealoha (? – March 5, 1877) serving in the 41st United States Colored Infantry.
- Alexander Kelly (April 7, 1840 – June 19, 1907) rising to a first sergeant of the 6th U.S. Colored Infantry, and received the Medal of Honor for service during the war.
- Bradford Leavitt (1868 – after 1912) serving in the 70th United States Colored Infantry as well as the 12th United States Colored Heavy Artillery.
- Hermann Lieb (May 24, 1826 – March 5, 1908) started with the 9th Louisiana Regiment Infantry (African Descent) which eventually became the 5th U.S. Colored Heavy Artillery and promoted to brevet brigadier general.
- Samuel R. Lowery (December 9, 1830– circa 1900) serving initially as chaplain of the 9th United States Heavy Artillery U.S. Colored Troops and later as teacher for the 2nd United States Colored Light Artillery.
- Elijah P. Marrs (January 1840 – August 30, 1910) serving as sergeant in the 12th Regiment Heavy Artillery U.S. Colored Troops.
- Edelmiro Mayer (28 May 1834 – 4 January 1897) was promoted to lieutenant colonel commanding the 45th United States Infantry Colored regiment.
- Selah Merrill (May 2, 1837 – January 22, 1909) serving as chaplain of the 49th United States Colored Infantry.
- Thomas Mower McDougall (21 May 1845 – 3 July 1909) serving as 2nd lieutenant of the 10th United States Louisiana Volunteers of African Descent, later redesignated as 48th US Colored Infantry.
- Charles E. Nash (May 23, 1844 – June 21, 1913) serving in the 82nd Regiment United States Volunteers and was promoted to the rank of sergeant major.
- Wyatt Outlaw (1820 – February 26, 1870) serving in the 2nd Regiment United States Colored Cavalry.
- P. B. S. Pinchback (May 10, 1837 – December 21, 1921) serving as a company commander in the 2nd Louisiana Regiment Native Guard Infantry, made up mostly of escaped slaves, later reformed as the 74th US Colored Infantry Regiment.
- Robert Pinn (March 1, 1843 – January 5, 1911) serving as first sergeant in the 5th United States Colored Infantry Regiment, also known as the 127th Ohio Volunteer Infantry and received the Medal of Honor for service during the war.
- Samuel Miller Quincy (1832 – March 24, 1887) was recommissioned as the lieutenant colonel of the 73rd United States Colored Infantry Regiment and was promoted to colonel in command of the regiment.
- Benjamin F. Randolph (1820 – October 16, 1868) as chaplain in the 26th Regiment Infantry U.S. Colored Troops.
- William Gould (W.G.) Raymond (1819–1893) serving as chaplain in the 1st United States Colored Infantry.
- Pleasant Richardson (1845 – May 30, 1935) was a former slave, and served in the 45th United States Colored Infantry Regiment.
- Edward Ratcliff (February 8, 1835 – March 10, 1915) serving as first sergeant in the 38th Regiment United States Colored Troops.
- Hiram Scofield (July 1, 1830 – December 30, 1906) serving in the 8th Louisiana Regiment Infantry (African Descent), later reorganized as the 47th Regiment Infantry U.S. Colored Troops and rising as a brevet brigadier general.
- Robert Smalls (April 5, 1839 – February 23, 1915) was commissioned second lieutenant of the 1st South Carolina Colored Infantry Regiment (later re-designated as the 33rd US Colored Infantry,) and his service in the navy was also recognized.
- Preston Taylor (November 7, 1849 – April 13, 1931) enlisted the 116th Regiment Infantry U.S. Colored Troops as a drummer.
- Walter Thorn (November 18, 1844 – July 20, 1920) served as second lieutenant in the 116th United States Colored Troops, attained the rank of major, and received the Medal of Honor for service during the war.
- David Torrance (March 3, 1840 – September 5, 1906) was commissioned a captain in the 29th Regiment U.S. Colored Troops and rose to serve as a lieutenant colonel.
- Benjamin F. Tracy (April 26, 1830 – August 6, 1915) was appointed a colonel of the 127th Infantry, U.S. Colored Troops.
- Henry McNeal Turner (February 1, 1834 – May 8, 1915) served as a chaplain in one of the first regiments of black troops.
- John B. Weber (September 21, 1842 – December 18, 1926) commanded of the 89th United States Colored Infantry.
- James F. Wade (April 14, 1843 – August 23, 1921) was promoted as a brevet lieutenant colonel of the 6th United States Colored Cavalry.
- Josiah T. Walls (December 30, 1842 – May 15, 1905) volunteered and was assigned to a United States Colored Troops regiment and rose to the rank of corporal.
- Godfrey Weitzel (November 1, 1835 – March 19, 1884) was assigned command of the XXV Corps.
- Lewis Ledyard Weld (May 13, 1833 – January 10, 1865) enrolled as a major, and subsequently became a lieutenant colonel of the 41st United States Colored Troops.
- Edward A. Wild (November 25, 1825 – August 28, 1891) was a brigadier general with a command of a brigade of black infantry comprised the 55th Massachusetts Infantry, and the 2nd and 3rd North Carolina Colored Volunteers (which later became renumbered as the 36th and 37th United States Colored Troops respectively).
- James Monroe Williams (September 12, 1833 – February 15, 1907) was the initial commander of the 1st Regiment Kansas Volunteer Infantry (Colored) and then commissioned as a lieutenant colonel as the 79th Regiment Infantry U.S. Colored Troops, and was later promoted to the rank of colonel.
- Henry Wilson (February 16, 1812 – November 22, 1875) served in the 31st and 104th Regiments of United States Colored Troops, and was promoted to lieutenant colonel and second-in-command of the 104th.
- Stewart L. Woodford (September 3, 1835 – February 14, 1913) was a colonel of the 103rd Colored Infantry Regiment and rose to brevet brigadier general.
- C. C. Vaughn (December 27, 1846 – October 21, 1923) enlisted in the 13th Regiment Heavy Artillery U.S. Colored Troops and was promoted to orderly sergeant.
- Charles Veale (1838 – July 27, 1872) enlisting as a private in the 4th Regiment United States Colored Infantry and was promoted to corporal, and received the Medal of Honor for service during the war.
- George Ziegler (1832–1912) was colonel of the 52nd Regiment of U.S. Colored Troops and was promoted to brevet brigadier general.

== See also ==
- Military history of African Americans in the American Civil War
- List of United States Colored Troops Civil War units
- List of museums focused on African Americans
