= C. C. Vaughn =

American educator and Baptist minister

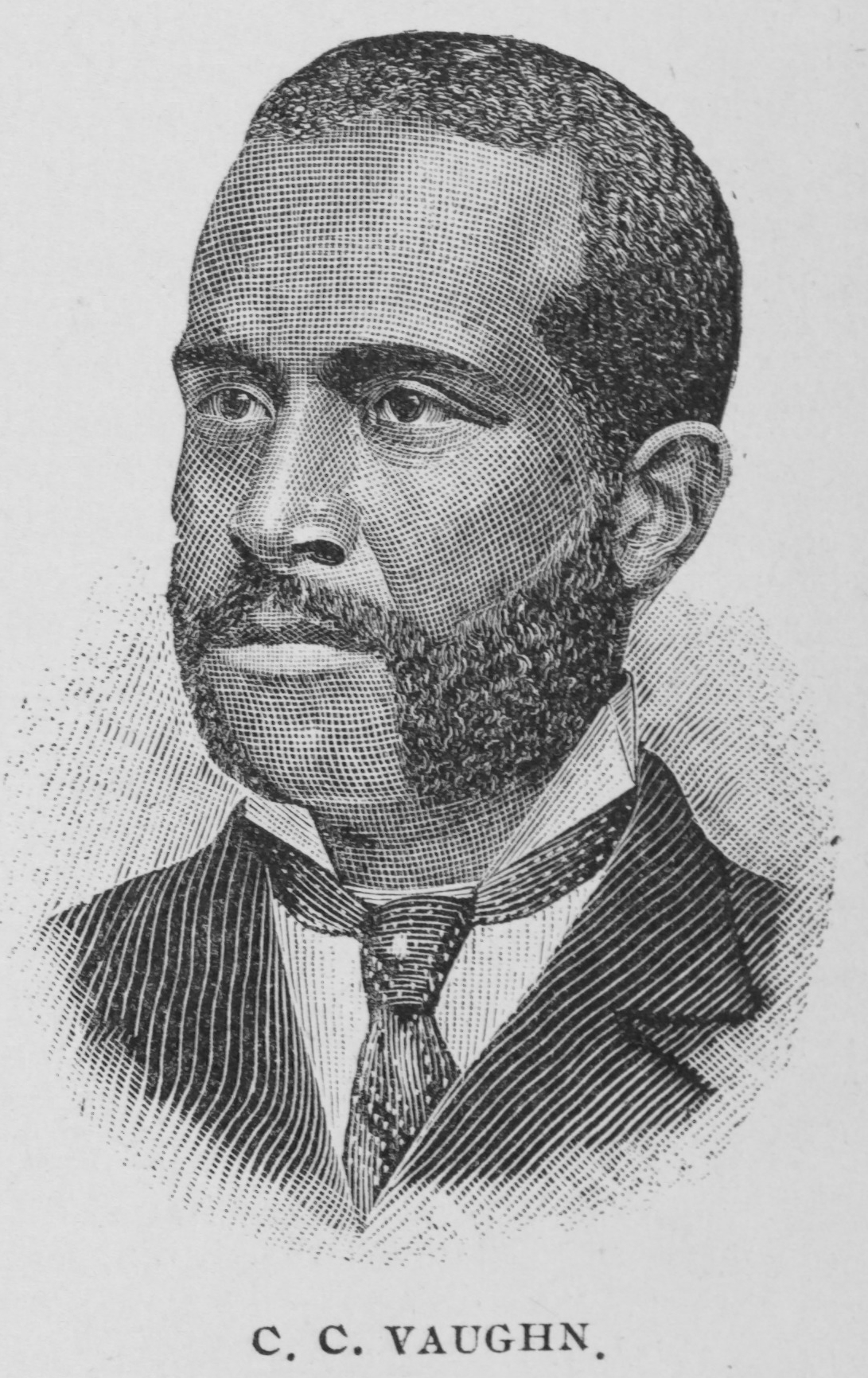
- Vaughn in 1887
- Born: Charles C. Vaughn, or Cornelius C. Vaughn; December 27, 1846; Dinwiddie County, Virginia
- Died: October 21, 1923 (aged 76); Russellville, Kentucky
- Education: Berea College
- Occupations: Minister, educator

Religious life
- Religion: Baptist

C. C. Vaughn (December 27, 1846 – October 21, 1923) was an American educator and Baptist minister in Ohio and Kentucky. He served in the American Civil War and was promoted to orderly sergeant in his heavy artillery regiment. He was also active in the Colored Conventions Movement and played prominent state and national roles in the Grand Army of the Republic, a veterans group, and the Independent Order of Good Samaritans and Daughters of Samaria, an African-American beneficial and temperance society. He is also known as Charles C. Vaughn, and Cornelius C. Vaughn.

== Early life ==
C. C. Vaughn was born a slave December 27, 1846, in Dinwiddie County, Virginia. His first name was given as Charles and as Cornelius. He and his family were owned by Theodoric H. Grigg, and in 1852, Grigg sold his plantation and moved with his slaves to Ohio where he set his slaves free. He lived with his cousin, who rented a farm where he labored in the summer and attended school in the winter. In 1861 and 1862, during the American Civil War (1861–1865) he worked in a brick-yard. In 1863, his cousin moved closer to Troy, Ohio, and Vaughn labored on Alexander M. Heywood's farm.

== Civil war ==
During the American Civil War, Vaughn enlisted in company F, 13th United States Colored Heavy Artillery Regiment in the Union army. He was transferred to company A, and promoted to orderly sergeant. He was mustered out of service on November 27, 1865.

== Career ==
He returned to his home and enrolled in Liber College in Liber, Jay County, Indiana, the only black student in the county. In 1866 he passed a qualifying examination to become a teacher in Sidney, Ohio and taught for three months. That fall he returned to Liber College. At the end of his term, he had run out of money and he returned to his farm, and he did not finish his studies at Liber. The next fall he went to Washington County, Ohio and passed another teaching examination in Marietta, Ohio. He then taught at a school in Wesley Township, Ohio. Around this time he became acquainted with Erastus Milo Cravath of the Freedman's Aid Association and the American Missionary Association in Cincinnati, Ohio. On April 14, 1867, he took a teaching job in Cynthiana, Kentucky teaching under the auspices of the American Missionary Association and the Western Freedman's Aid Commission. At Cynthiana, he faced much animosity as a northern teacher, but he remained for two years. At the end of that time he returned to school, now at Berea College, where he also worked as a janitor, chopped wood, and student-taught, allowing him to finish his course. January 12, 1874 he began to teach in Russellville at the colored Baptist church, where he remained.

He converted to the Baptist religion in 1869 and became a member of the Russellville church in 1875 where he served as clerk. The next May he was licensed to preach, and in June he took the role of lead preacher after the resignation of Elder Moses Harding. He was ordained in September 1877 at the First District Association by a council including G. W. Dupee, Allen Allensworth, Moses Harding, Daniel Jones, William Howell, J. F. Thomas, and E. M. Manion.

He married Ella Slaughter. His date of marriage was reported by William J. Simmons as January 1, 1879, although Kentucky marriage records list it as occurring on September 15, 1881.

== Civil activities ==
He was active in politics and social affairs. He advocated in favor of civil rights and suffrage for blacks. In 1884 in Louisville, Kentucky he was elected chairman on the State Convention of Colored Men. He was treasurer of the District Lodge of the Grand United Order of Odd Fellows for six years and was State Grand Chief of the Independent Order of Good Samaritans and Daughters of Samaria in 1883, and in 1884 was vice-chief of the body and a member of the national executive committee. In 1892 and 1894 he was elected High Worthy National Grand Chirf of the same body. In 1886, he was vice-assistant moderator of the General Association of Baptists. He also was a prominent member of the Grand Army of the Republic, a civil war veterans association. He held positions in the state and national departments of the group, and was on group commander-in-chief John Palmer's staff.

== Death ==
Vaughn died on October 21, 1923, and was buried in Maple Grove Cemetery in Russelville, Kentucky.
