= William Henry Egle =

American physician, author and historian from Pennsylvania

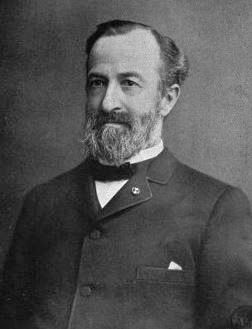
- Born: September 17, 1830; Harrisburg, Pennsylvania
- Died: February 19, 1901 (aged 70); Harrisburg, Pennsylvania
- Education: University of Pennsylvania
- Occupation: Pennsylvania State Librarian (1887–1889)
- Spouse: Eliza Beatty (m. 1860)
- Parent(s): John Egle and Elizabeth (Von Treupel) Egle

William Henry Egle (1830–1901) was a physician, author and historian who served as the State Librarian of the Commonwealth of Pennsylvania from 1887 to 1889. A practicing physician at the dawn of the American Civil War, he was initially commissioned as an assistant surgeon, and then served as a surgeon with several different Union Army regiments during the course of the conflict, including the 116th Regiment Infantry, U.S. Colored Troops (USCT).

Post-war, he garnered the respect of colleagues in his respective fields of endeavor, particularly so for his body of work which documented Pennsylvania's history from its founding through the late 19th century – excerpts of which continued to be reprinted in newspapers following his death in 1901 and are still cited as references by present-day historians and professional genealogists. His death was "deeply mourned" by many, according to historian Luther Reily Kelker, who said of Egle, "few brighter, nobler types of manhood have ever adorned the generations of men in the Keystone State."

== Formative years ==
Born in Harrisburg, Pennsylvania on September 17, 1830, William Henry Egle was a son of Pennsylvania natives John Egle (1798–1834) and Elizabeth (von Treupel) Egle (1810–1841). Reared in Dauphin County, Pennsylvania, he was compelled to relocate to the home of his paternal grandmother in 1834, following the sudden death of his father. Educated initially in the county's public schools, he then spent two years at the Harrisburg Military Institute.

As a 20-year-old during the summer of 1850, he was one of several young men working as a printer for, and living with, master printer Theophilus Ferne in Harrisburg's West Ward. During his three years with the Pennsylvania Telegraph, he worked his way up to become foreman and then state printer. He then began his medical studies under the training of Harrisburg physician Charles D. Bombaugh, M.D. Supporting his training through employment as a teacher and mail clerk, he enrolled in 1857 for formal studies with the medical department at the University of Pennsylvania, graduating from there in March 1859. Once back home in Harrisburg, he opened a private medical practice.

In 1860, he wed Eliza Beatty (1833–1923). The following year, they welcomed the birth of a son, Beverly Waugh Egle (1861–1882).

== Civil War ==
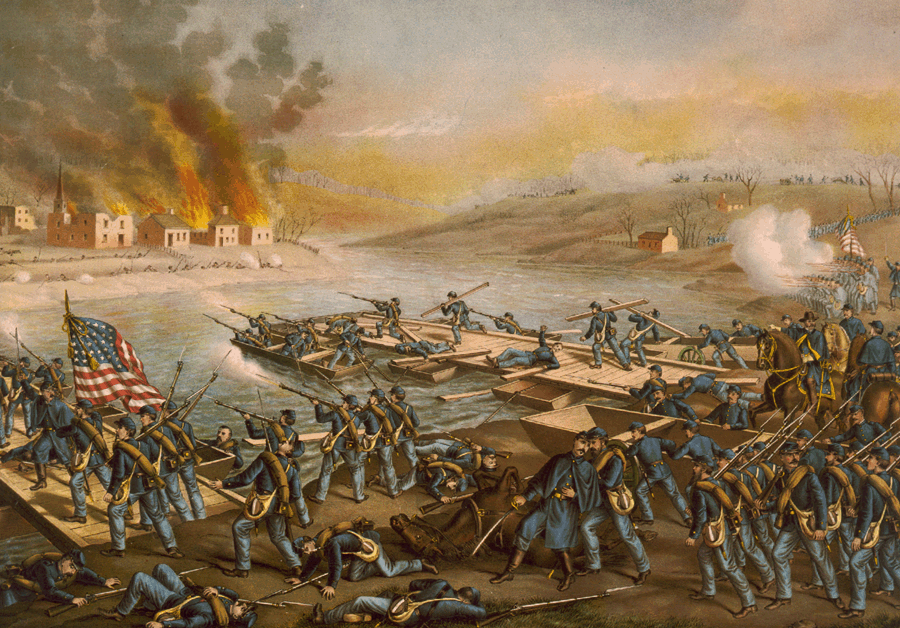
Union Army crossing the Rappahannock River prior to the Battle of Fredericksburg, December 13, 1862

On September 12, 1862, William H. Egle, M.D. enrolled for Civil War military service at Bakersville, Maryland, and was commissioned as an assistant surgeon with the field and staff officers' corps of the 96th Pennsylvania Volunteer Infantry, a position he held until resigning his commission roughly six months later. Stationed in Virginia with his regiment throughout the fall of 1862, he experienced his first true taste of life as a combat surgeon with the 96th Pennsylvania's participation in the Battle of Fredericksburg. Involved in engagements ranging from light skirmishes to intense battles under heavy rifle and artillery fire beginning on December 12, 1862, he and his fellow 96th Pennsylvanians finally found relief three days later when they were ordered back across the Rappahannock River and made camp near White Oak Church. Caring for men who were primarily assigned to fatigue duty from January through March 1863, he resigned his commission on March 9 of that year.

He was then commissioned as a surgeon at the age of 32, and enrolled on July 10, 1863 with the field and staff officers' corps of the 47th Pennsylvania Militia, Emergency of 1863. (Not to be confused with the 47th Pennsylvania Infantry Regiment, the 47th Pennsylvania Militia, Emergency of 1863 was one of a group of temporary volunteer militia units which were formed in response to the threatened invasion of Pennsylvania by Confederate troops during the summer of 1863. When the threat was deemed over by Pennsylvania's governor and senior military leaders, these units were disbanded, and their men were sent back to their respective communities.) A resident of Lancaster County, Pennsylvania at the time of his enrollment, Egle officially mustered in at Camp Curtin in Harrisburg the next day, but remained in that position only until August 14 when the entire regiment honorably mustered out. During this phase of service, the 47th Pennsylvania Militia, Emergency of 1863 was assigned to duty stations in Williamsport, Lycoming County; Reading, Berks County; and Schuylkill County, where it was ordered to dampen the rising tension between miners and Union Army recruiters.

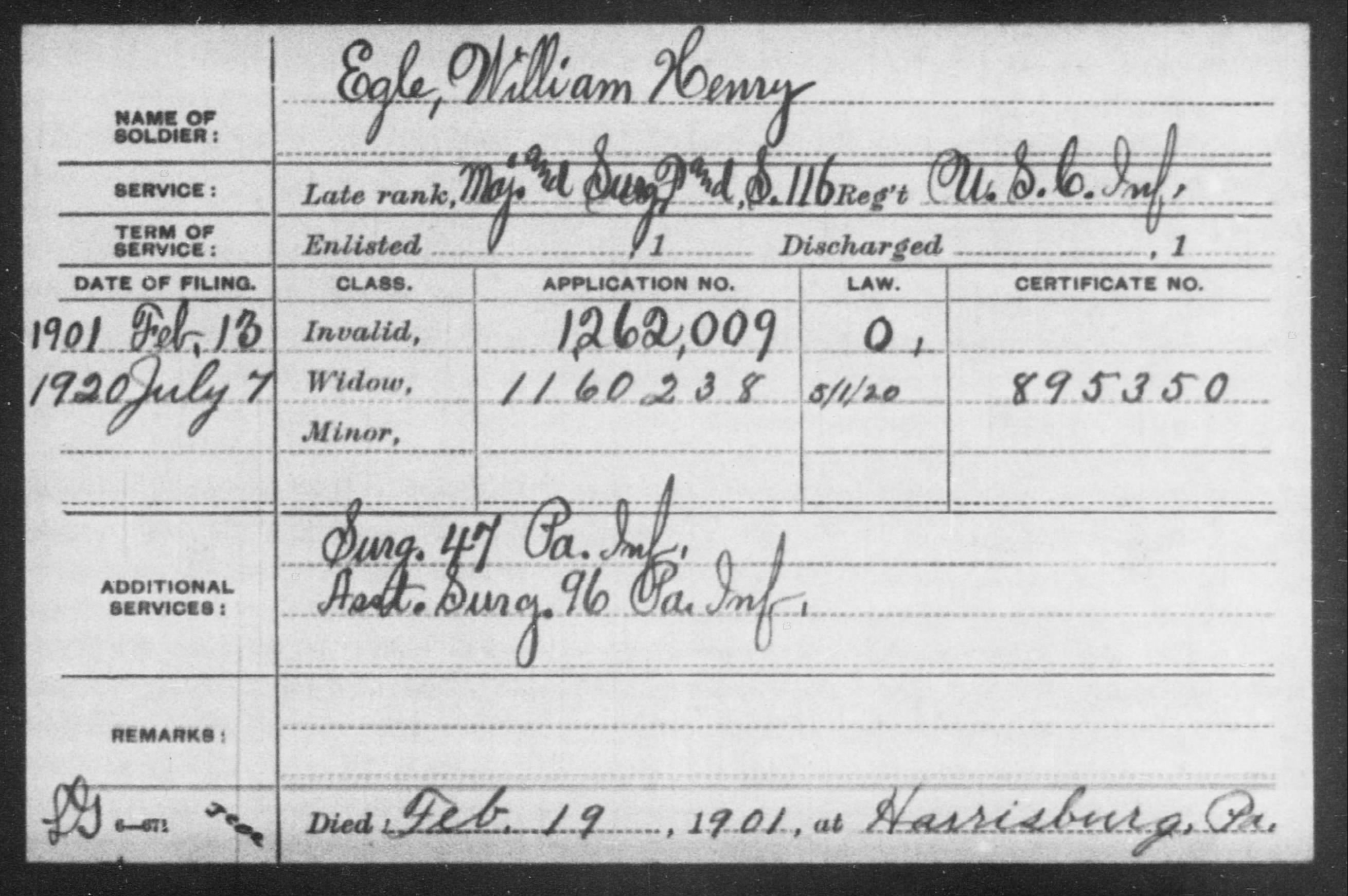
Egle's U.S. Civil War Pension Index data (U.S. National Archives/Fold3)

He then enrolled for a third term of military service. Commissioned again as a surgeon, he mustered in at Camp Nelson, Kentucky on 12 July 1864 with Company S of the 116th Regiment Infantry, U.S. Colored Troops (USCT). On August 12, 1864, he was promoted to the rank of major. Attached to the Military District of Kentucky, Department of Ohio until September 1864, he and the other members of his regiment then served with the U.S. Army's X Corps (Army of the James) until November of that same year when the regiment became part of the X Corps' 1st Brigade, 3rd Division.

Transferred with his regiment to the U.S. Army's XXV Corps, 1st Brigade, 2nd Division in December 1864, he and his fellow 116th USCT members remained part of that command until April 1865, when the regiment was reassigned to the XXV Corps' 3rd Brigade, 2nd Division, and saw service with the Department of Texas.

After mustering out of the 116th USCT on November 9, 1865, he was appointed as the executive medical officer for the U.S. Army's XXIV Corps, serving under General William Birney at Petersburg and Appomattox before being transferred to General Jackson's division and service near Roma, Texas from June through December 1865 when he again resigned.

== Post-war life ==
Following his resignation from the military, Egle returned home to his wife and medical practice in Pennsylvania. He also embarked on what would become a prolific career as a chronicler of Pennsylvania history. Before the decade was over, he and his wife welcomed the births of daughters, Sarah Beatty (1866–1939) and Catharine Irwin (1869–1943), on July 13, 1866 and January 19, 1869, respectively. A federal census taker in 1870 confirmed that Egle was employed as a physician, and noted that he had amassed real estate and personal property valued at $15,000, equivalent to $382,000 in 2025, while the 1880 federal census taker described him as a "druggist". The latter census also noted that the Egle household included son Beverly, a 19-year-old medical student; daughters "Sallie" and "Kittie", who were both still in school; and Mary Williams (aged 45) and Mary Jones (aged 30), who were employed as domestic workers in the Egle home.

The 1870s and 1880s were productive for Egle, as he became increasingly known and respected for his historical research and writing. In 1878, Lafayette College presented him with an "honorary degree [an A.M.] for his service in American history." This triumph was soon followed by tragedy, however, when Egle learned that his only son, Beverly, had died suddenly in Cook County, Illinois on June 21, 1882.

In addition to his work as an author and historian during the early to mid-1880s, William Egle was also employed as the physician for Dauphin County's prison. By 1887, he had been appointed as State Librarian for the Commonwealth of Pennsylvania, a position he held for the next twelve years. According to the Bloomsburg, Pennsylvania newspaper, The Columbian, Egle secured the position after Pennsylvania's Republican-controlled Senate failed to approve the governor's first choice for the post, York Press editor Edward Stuck. As a result, Egle's "term was lengthened and his salary increased in direct contravention of the provisions of the Constitution."

On June 4, 1896, he was one of the featured presenters at the Congress of the Scotch-Irish Society of America. Newspapers as far away as Honolulu Hawaii, reported that he spoke about "Landmarks of Early Scotch-Irish Settlements in Pennsylvania."

Succeeded in early 1899 in his appointment as State Librarian by the Rev. Dr. George Edward Reed, the head of Dickinson College in Carlisle, Pennsylvania, Egle was described as a physician shortly after the turn of the century, when a federal government employee arrived at his Harrisburg home to interview him for the 1900 U.S. Census. Still residing with him were his wife, and his daughter Catharine.

== Death and interment ==
Sometime during the winter of 1901, Egle contracted the grippe, which then turned into pneumonia. He died from related complications in Harrisburg on February 19, 1901. Following funeral services at St. Stephen's Episcopal Church which were well attended by friends and colleagues, he was laid to rest at the Harrisburg Cemetery. John Peter Shindel Gobin, Pennsylvania's lieutenant governor at the time, served as one of his pallbearers. A 32nd degree Mason, Egle had been a member of the Robert Burns Masonic Lodge, as well as a member of the Grand Army of the Republic and past president of the YMCA.

In the days following his death, The Harrisburg Patriot described him as "a noted physician, historian and genealogist and the author of a large number of valuable works of local and national interest." Additionally, for several years after his death, his name continued to appear in newspapers across the country. In a "this day in history" chronology presented in its September 17, 1908 edition, the daily newspaper of Palestine, Texas listed the birth of "William Henry Egle, historian" as its noteworthy event for the year 1830. Two years later, a newspaper in South Dakota published "The Blacksmith of the Revolution", an excerpt from his "address at the unveiling of a monument erected by the state of Pennsylvania at Newville, to William Denning, the blacksmith of the revolution, October 6, 1890."

== Publications (abridged list) ==
- Egle, William Henry. An Illustrated History of the Commonwealth of Pennsylvania, Civil, Political and Military, From Its Earliest Settlement to the Present Time. Harrisburg, Pennsylvania: De Witt C. Goodrich and Co., 1876. ISBN 1-2861-7074-5
- Egle, William Henry. Andrew Gregg Curtin: his life and services. Philadelphia, Pennsylvania: Avil Printing Company, 1895. OCLC 707356050
- Egle, William Henry. "The Buckshot War," in The Pennsylvania Magazine of History and Biography, Vol. 23, No. 2, pp. 137-156. Philadelphia, Pennsylvania: University of Pennsylvania Press, 1899.
- Egle, William Henry. History of the counties of Dauphin and Lebanon: in the commonwealth of Pennsylvania; biographical and genealogical. Philadelphia, Pennsylvania: Everts & Peck, 1883. OCLC 894892215
- Egle, William Henry, ed. Names of Foreigners Who Took the Oath of Allegiance to the Province and State of Pennsylvania, 1727–1775, With the Foreign Arrivals, 1786–1808. Harrisburg, Pennsylvania: E.K. Meyers, State Printer, 1892. OCLC 866634933
- Egle, William Henry, ed.: Notes and Queries, Historical, Biographical, and Genealogical, Chiefly Relating to Interior Pennsylvania, Volume 1. Harrisburg, Pennsylvania: Lane S. Hart, printer and binder, 1883. OCLC 45433433
- Egle, William. Pennsylvania genealogies : chiefly Scotch-Irish and German. Harrisburg, Pennsylvania: Harrisburg Publishing Company, 1896.OCLC 938548954
- Egle, William Henry. Some Pennsylvania Women During the War of the Revolution. Harrisburg, Pennsylvania: Harrisburg Pub. Co., 1898. ISBN 0271065400
- Egle, William Henry. The arms of Pennsylvania and the great seal of the Commonwealth. Harrisburg, Pennsylvania: State Library, c. 1895. OCLC 28681996
- Egle, William Henry. The private soldier of the Army of the Declaration: an address delivered at the unveiling of the monument erected by the state of Pennsylvania to William Denning, the soldier blacksmith of the Revolution, at Newville, October 6, 1890. Harrisburg, Pennsylvania: Harrisburg Pub. Co., 1890. OCLC 166621067
- Linn, John Blair and William Henry Egle, eds.: Pennsylvania War of the Revolution: Battalions and Line, 1775–1783 (2 volumes). Harrisburg, Pennsylvania: Lane S. Hart, printer, 1880. ISBN 0271036419
- Egle, William H. (1880). "The Constitutional Convention of 1776 (continued)". The Pennsylvania Magazine of History and Biography. 4 (2). University of Pennsylvania Press: 225–233. JSTOR 20084457.
- Egle, William H. (1880). "The Constitutional Convention of 1776 (concluded)". The Pennsylvania Magazine of History and Biography. 4 (3). University of Pennsylvania Press: 361–372. JSTOR 20084466.

== See also ==
- List of Pennsylvania Civil War Units
- Pennsylvania in the American Civil War
