= J. R. Kealoha =

Hawaiian Union Army soldier (died 1877)

- Born: Kingdom of Hawaiʻi
- Died: March 5, 1877
- Burial place: Oʻahu Cemetery
- Military career
- Allegiance: United States; Union
- Branch: Union Army
- Service years: 1864–65
- Rank: Private
- Unit: 41st Regiment United States Colored Troops
- Conflicts: American Civil War: Richmond–Petersburg campaign; Appomattox campaign

J. R. Kealoha (died March 5, 1877) was a Hawaiian soldier who joined the Union Army during the American Civil War. Considered one of the "Hawaiʻi sons of the Civil War", he was among a group of more than one hundred documented Native Hawaiian and Hawaiʻi-born combatants who fought in the American Civil War while the Kingdom of Hawaiʻi was an independent nation.

Kealoha enlisted in the 41st United States Colored Infantry, a United States Colored Troops regiment formed in Pennsylvania. Participating in the siege of Petersburg, he and another Hawaiian soldier met the Hawaiʻi-born Colonel Samuel Chapman Armstrong, who recorded their encounter in a letter home. With the 41st USCT, Kealoha was present at the surrender of Confederate General Robert E. Lee and the Army of Northern Virginia at Appomattox Court House on April 9, 1865. After the war, Kealoha returned to Hawaiʻi. He died on March 5, 1877, and was buried in an unmarked grave in Honolulu's Oʻahu Cemetery.

The legacy and contributions of Kealoha and other Hawaiian participants in the American Civil War were largely forgotten except in the private circles of descendants and historians, but in later years there was a revival of interest in the Hawaiian community. In 2010, these "Hawaiʻi sons of the Civil War" were commemorated with a bronze plaque erected along the memorial pathway at the National Memorial Cemetery of the Pacific in Honolulu. In 2014, through another local effort, a grave marker was dedicated over J. R. Kealoha's burial site, which had remained unmarked for 137 years.

== Life ==
After the outbreak of the American Civil War, the Kingdom of Hawaiʻi under King Kamehameha IV declared its neutrality on August 26, 1861. Despite the declaration of neutrality, many Native Hawaiians and Hawaiʻi-born Americans (mainly descendants of American missionaries) abroad and in the islands volunteered and enlisted in the military regiments of various states in the Union and the Confederacy. Participation by Native Hawaiians in American wars was not unheard of. Individual Native Hawaiians had served in the United States Navy and Army since the War of 1812, and even more served during the American Civil War. Many Hawaiians sympathized with the Union because of Hawaiʻi's ties to New England through its missionaries and the whaling industries, and the ideological opposition of many to the institution of slavery.

Nothing is known about the life of J. R. Kealoha before the war. He enlisted in 1864 as a private and was assigned to the 41st Regiment United States Colored Troops (USCT), a colored regiment formed in Camp William Penn, Pennsylvania, between September 30 and December 7, 1864, under the command of Colonel Llewellyn F. Haskell. Most Native Hawaiians who participated in the war were assigned to the colored regiments because of their dark skin color and the segregationist policy in the military at the time. Kealoha is one of the few Hawaiian soldiers of the Civil War whose Hawaiian name is known; many combatants served under anglicized pseudonyms because they were easier for English-speaking Americans to pronounce than Hawaiian language names. They often were registered as kanakas, the nineteenth-century term for Hawaiians and Pacific Islanders, with the "Sandwich Islands" (Hawaiʻi) noted as their place of origin.

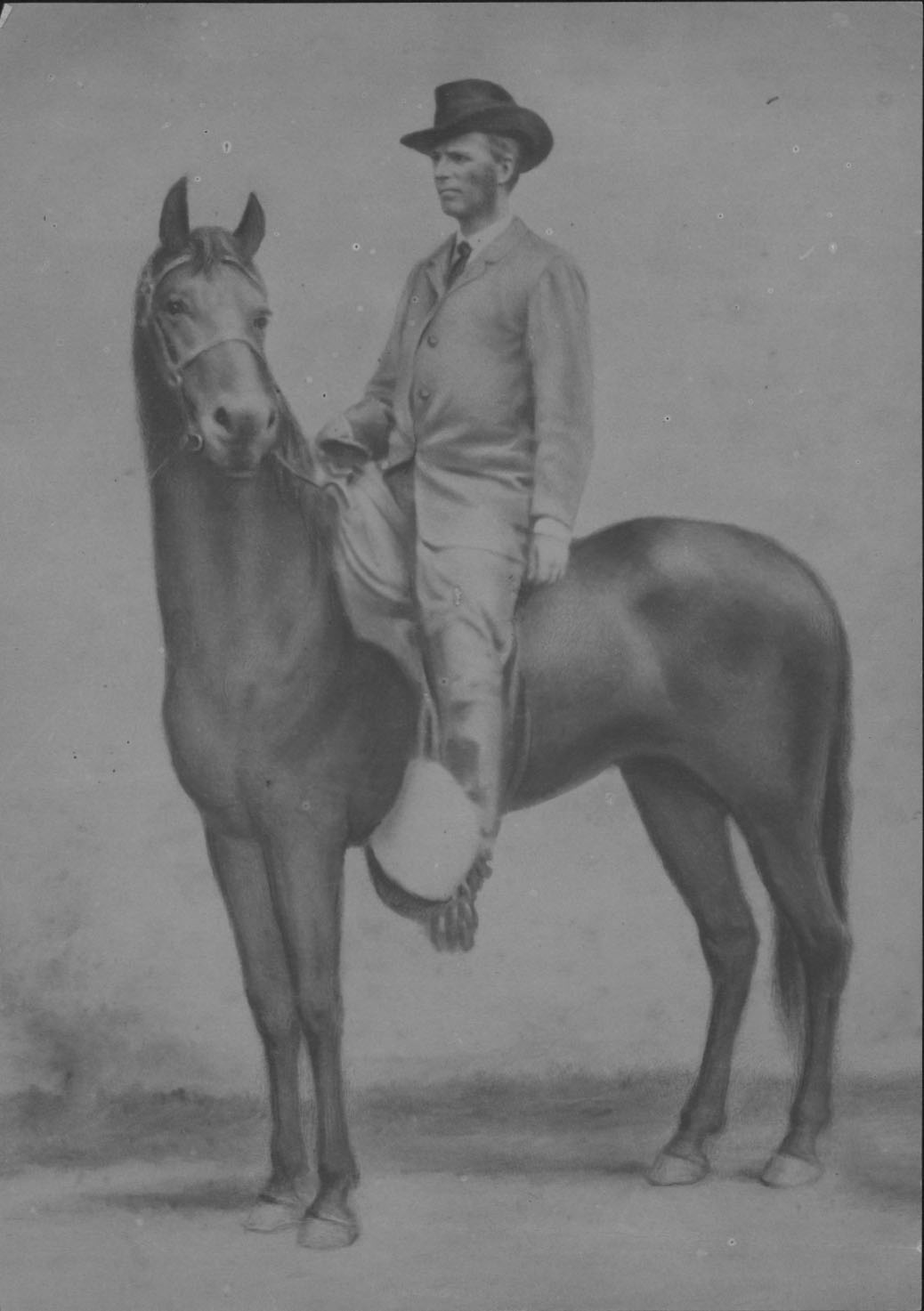
Samuel Chapman Armstrong, one of the highest-ranking Hawaiian combatants in the Civil War and in command of the 9th USCT and 8th USCT, was the source of information about the presence of Kealoha among the soldiers participating in the war

From October 1864 to April 1865, Kealoha fought in the Richmond–Petersburg campaign, better known as the siege of Petersburg. During the campaign, Kealoha and another Hawaiian named Kaiwi, of the 28th Regiment United States Colored Troops, came across Samuel Chapman Armstrong, a son of an American missionary posted in Maui. Armstrong wrote of the encounter in a letter home that later, was published in the Hawaiian missionary newspaper The Friend in 1865:

Yesterday, as my orderly was holding my horse, I asked him where he was from. He said he was from Hawaii! He proved to be a full-blood Kanaka, by the name of Kealoha, who came from the Islands last year. There is also another, by the name of Kaiwi, who lived near Judge Smith's, who left the Islands last July. I enjoyed seeing them very much and we had a good jabber in kanaka. Kealoha is a private in the 41st Regiment US Colored Troops, and Kaiwi is a Private in the 28th U.S.C.T., in the pioneer corps. Both are good men and seemed glad to have seen me.

Kealoha survived months of trench warfare during the Richmond–Petersburg campaign and fought with the 41st USCT at the Battle of Appomattox Court House. He was present at the surrender of Confederate General Robert E. Lee and the Army of Northern Virginia at Appomattox Court House on April 9, 1865. The 41st USCT regiment was mustered out of service on November 10, 1865, at Brownsville, Texas, and was discharged December 14, 1865, at Philadelphia. Kealoha's enlistment of service is not present in any existing records or history from the 41st USCT regiment. Historians Justin Vance and Anita Manning speculate that "it is possible that his service is noted under a different name" or his name was never recorded because only the muster-out rolls from the regiment were returned to the Adjutant General's office after the unit disbanded.

After the war, Kealoha returned to Hawaiʻi. He died on March 5, 1877, and was buried with eighteen other Native Hawaiians in an unmarked grave in Section 1, Lot 56 of the Oʻahu Cemetery, Honolulu. During the Hawaii Territorial period, Kealoha's Civil War service was recorded by the United Veterans Service Council (UVSC), a precursor of the United States Department of Veterans Affairs (VA), which included his name in their records as a "Deceased Veteran" and listed the location of his burial.

== Memorials ==
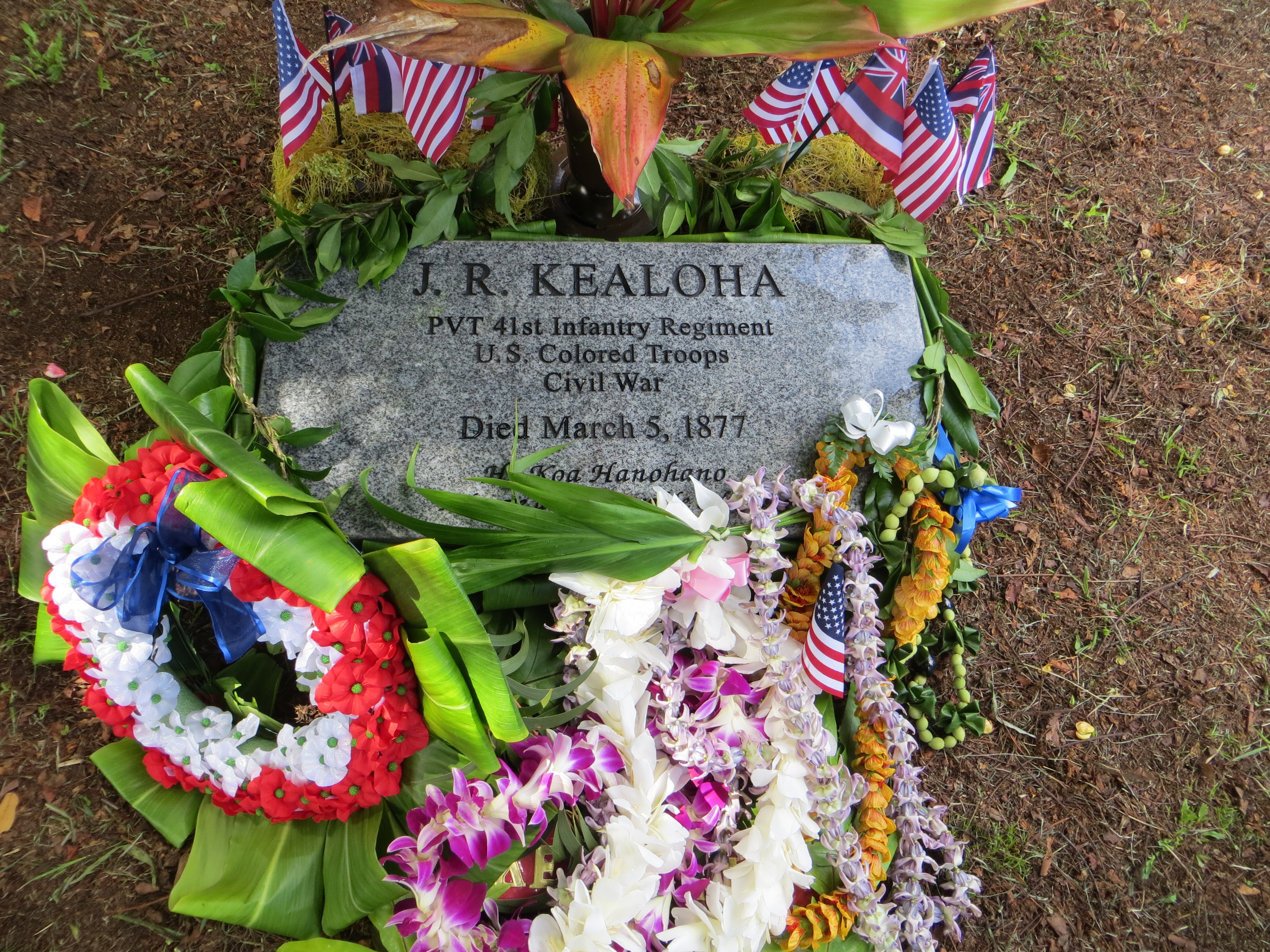
Grave marker of J. R. Kealoha, adorned with sacred maile lei, a koa branch, and other offerings after the dedication ceremony

For 137 years, Kealoha's burial site remained unmarked until a Hawaiian group affiliated with the organization Hawaiʻi Civil War Round Table, consisting of Anita Manning, Nanette Napoleon, Eric Mueller, and Justin Vance, started an effort to give him a grave marker. Historian Anita Manning, a member of this group, had discovered the records containing Kealoha's name at the Hawaii State Archives in 2011. It listed his service in the war and the location of his burial place, but when Manning went to the site of his grave, she was disappointed by the absence of a headstone. Giving the reason for the significance of Kealoha's service, Manning stated:

Kealoha represents many Hawaiian men and men from Hawaii who served in the Civil War who knew what they were getting into, who took a risk, and we all are the beneficiaries of that work and risk that they took ... We owe it to them to recognize that service.

The group petitioned the United States Department of Veterans Affairs for a marker for Kealoha, but the Department denied the request because there was no next of kin to approve the request. A 2009 policy change enacted in 2012 required that only next of kin could request VA memorials. After the denial of the request, Honor Life Memorials, a local monument maker, donated a granite marker for Kealoha.

The marker was formally dedicated and unveiled on October 25, 2014. Dressed in period costumes, members of the Hawaiʻi Civil War Round Table and others took part in the dedication ceremony at Oʻahu Cemetery. The ceremony was marked by military honors and a gun salute by a unit of Civil War re-enactors. Hawaiian minister Kahu Silva presided over the dedication ceremony, and in accordance with traditional Hawaiian customs, the consecrated marker was adorned with a sacred maile lei and a koa branch, representing "Kealoha's noble qualities of bravery, courage, and valor." The marker is inscribed with his name, regiment, death date, and the Hawaiian and English text: "He Koa Hanohano, a brave and honorable soldier".

Other Hawaiian veterans of the Civil War are honored in Honolulu's National Memorial Cemetery of the Pacific with a bronze memorial plaque that was erected in 2010 in recognition of the "Hawaiʻi sons of the Civil War", the more than one hundred documented Hawaiians who served with the Union and the Confederacy. As of 2014, researchers have identified 119 documented Hawaiian and Hawaiʻi-born combatants from historical records. The exact number remains uncertain because of the lack of records. Of the 48 identified Native Hawaiian combatants, including James Wood Bush and Henry Hoʻolulu Pitman, Kealoha is the only one buried in Hawaii whose gravesite is known. According to Hawaiian news reporter Chelsea Davis, Kealoha has come to "[represent] all the men of Hawaii who took up arms in America's Civil War but who have been forgotten."

== See also ==
- Hawaii and the American Civil War

== Bibliography ==
Books and journals

- Bates, Samuel P. (1871). History of Pennsylvania Volunteers, 1861–5; Prepared in Compliance with Acts of the Legislature. Vol. V. B. Singerly, State Printer: Harrisburg, PA. OCLC 1887553.
- Cox, Christopher (2013). History of Pennsylvania Civil War Regiments: Artillery, Cavalry, Volunteers, Reserve Corps, and United States Colored Troops. Raleigh, NC: Lulu Publishing. ISBN 978-1-300-71312-8.
- Kuykendall, Ralph Simpson (1953). The Hawaiian Kingdom 1854–1874, Twenty Critical Years. Vol. 2. Honolulu: University of Hawaii Press. ISBN 978-0-87022-432-4. OCLC 47010821.
- Manning, Anita; Vance, Justin W. (2014). "Hawaiʻi at Home During the American Civil War". Hawaiian Journal of History. 47. Honolulu: Hawaiian Historical Society: 145–170. hdl:10524/47259. OCLC 60626541.
- Okihiro, Gary (2015). American History Unbound: Asians and Pacific Islanders. Oakland: University of California Press. ISBN 978-0-520-96030-5. OCLC 914255697.
- Raphael-Hernandez, Heike; Steen, Shannon (2006). AfroAsian Encounters: Culture, History, Politics. New York: New York University Press. p. 321. ISBN 978-0-8147-7581-3. OCLC 181536004.
- Schmitt, Robert C. (1998). "Hawaiʻi's War Veterans and Battle Deaths". Hawaiian Journal of History. 32. Honolulu: Hawaiian Historical Society: 171–174. hdl:10524/521. OCLC 60626541.
- Shively, Carol A., ed. (2015). "Pacific Islanders and the Civil War". Asians and Pacific Islanders and the Civil War. Washington, DC: National Park Service. pp. 130–163. ISBN 978-1-59091-167-9. OCLC 904731668.
  - Vance, Justin; Manning, Anita. Introduction. In Shively (2015), pp. 132–135.
  - ——; ——. "J. R. Kealoha". In Shively (2015), pp. 138–141.
  - ——; ——. "The Impact of the Civil War on the Kingdom of Hawaii". In Shively (2015), pp. 161–163.
- Vance, Justin W.; Manning, Anita (October 2012). "The Effects of the American Civil War on Hawaiʻi and the Pacific World". World History Connected. 9 (3). Champaign, IL: University of Illinois.

Newspapers and online sources

- Armstrong, Samuel C. (April 1, 1865). "Extract of a Letter from Col. Armstrong". The Friend. Vol. 22, no. 4. Honolulu: Samuel C. Damon. p. 30. Archived from the original on December 8, 2015.
- Cole, William (February 23, 2014). "Civil War Veteran's Grave Will Remain Unmarked". Honolulu Star-Advertiser. Honolulu. Archived from the original on July 3, 2020 – via Questia.
- Cole, William (May 31, 2010). "Native Hawaiians served on both sides during Civil War". Honolulu Star-Advertiser. Honolulu. Archived from the original on February 17, 2016.
- Davis, Chelsea (October 26, 2014). "Hawaiian Civil War soldier finally recognized". Hawaii News Now.
- Drewes, Paul (October 5, 2014). "Hawaii soldier who fought in the Civil War finally honored. Recognition comes 137 years later". KITV 4 News. Archived from the original on December 14, 2014.
- Hawai’i Pacific University (April 2, 2015). "Bells Ring at Fort Street Mall to Commemorate 150th Anniversary of the end of U.S. Civil War". Hawai’i Pacific University. Archived from the original on September 5, 2015.
- Iwamoto, Karen A. (October 21, 2014). "Living History Day celebrates Tropic Lightning". Hawai’i Army Weekly. Fort Shafter, HI: Public Affairs Office of the United States Army Western Command. Archived from the original on August 16, 2018.
- Kozlovich, Beth-Ann. "Hawaii's involvement in the Civil War, Town Square, Hawaii Public Radio (audio) – By Beth-Ann Kozlovich, July 4, 2013, interview with Anita Manning, Nanette Napoleon and Justin Vance". Archived from the original on February 13, 2017.
- Kozlovich, Beth-Ann; Napoleon, Nanette (September 22, 2014). "Pvt. Kealoha Tombstone". Hawaii Public Radio-HPR2. Archived from the original on October 4, 2015.
- Manning, Anita (October 2014). "Latest News of Hawaii U. S. Civil War Veterans Elks Invited to Dedication of Hawai'i Civil War Vet Tombstone" (PDF). The Aloha Elk, Honolulu Lodge No. 616 B.P.O.E. Vol. 70, no. 7. Archived from the original (PDF) on August 16, 2018.
- Punaboy (June 20, 2015). "Hawai'i Sons of the Civil War". Aloha Valley. Archived from the original on July 17, 2015.
- Silva, Kahu (November 15, 2014). "Hawaiian Hero Honored". Hawaii Cultural Services. Archived from the original on April 19, 2015.
- Von Buol, Peter (November–December 2012). "Maui's Civil War Hero". Maui Nō Ka Magazine. Wailuku, HI: Haynes Publishing Group.
