= Joel Dewey =

Joel Allen Dewey
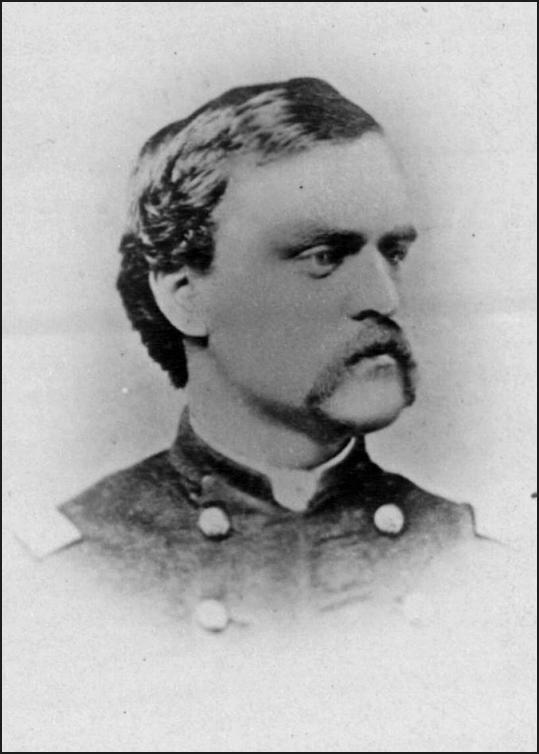
- Joel Allen Dewey
- Born: September 20, 1840; Georgia, Vermont
- Died: June 17, 1873 (aged 32); Knoxville, Tennessee
- Burial place: Dandridge Revolutionary War Graveyard, Dandridge, Tennessee
- Military career
- Allegiance: United States of America; Union
- Branch: United States Army; Union Army
- Service years: 1861 - 1866
- Rank: Brigadier General
- Commands: 111th U.S. Colored Infantry
- Conflicts: American Civil War

Joel Allen Dewey (September 20, 1840 – June 17, 1873) was a Union Army colonel during the American Civil War. He was appointed a brigadier general of volunteers in November 1865, after the conclusion of the war, but he was mustered out on January 31, 1866, before the U.S. Senate confirmed his appointment on February 23, 1866. After the war, he was a lawyer and district attorney general in Tennessee.

== Biography ==
Dewey was born in Georgia, Vermont, the son of Horace and Harriet (Peck) Dewey. He entered Oberlin College in 1858, but withdrew in October 1861 when he accepted a commission as 2nd Lieutenant in the 58th Ohio Infantry. He was promoted to captain and served in the 43rd Ohio Infantry. Dewey was engaged at New Madrid, Iuka, Corinth, and on garrison duty in Tennessee.

He was commissioned lieutenant colonel of the 111th U.S. Colored Infantry on February 14, 1864. He led a brigade in operations in Alabama, and was captured by Nathan Forrest's cavalry near Athens, Georgia. After he was exchanged, he served in Alabama and Tennessee for the remainder of the war.

He was promoted to colonel in command of his regiment on April 29, 1865. His final promotion was to brigadier general of U.S. Volunteers on November 20, 1865, at the young age of 25, although his nomination was not sent to the U.S. Senate by President Andrew Johnson until January 13, 1866 and the U.S. Senate did not confirm the appointment until February 23, 1866. He resigned from the volunteer service on January 1, 1866, having declined a captaincy in the Regular Army. He was mustered out on January 31, 1866.

After the war, he studied law at Albany Law School, graduating in 1867, and moved to Dandridge, Tennessee, where he practiced law. He was Attorney General of the Second District of Tennessee from 1869 until his death in 1873, in Knoxville, Tennessee. He is buried in Dandridge, Tennessee.

== See also ==
- List of American Civil War generals (Union)
- List of Ohio's American Civil War generals
