= Marcus Dale =

- Born: 1832; Gallipolis, Ohio
- Died: December 7, 1892 (aged 59–60); New Orleans, Louisiana
- Education: Oberlin College
- Occupations: Cooper, minister

Religious life
- Religion: African Methodist Episcopal

Marcus Dale (1832 – December 7, 1892) was a leading African Methodist Episcopal preacher in New Orleans.

== Early life ==
Marcus Dale was born in 1832 in Galliopolis, Ohio, to free black parents David and Synthia Dale who were both born in North Carolina. In about 1842, the family moved to Detroit, Michigan. David died while Marcus was still young, and he quit school to help raise four younger siblings, working as a cooper. In January 1852 he joined the African Methodist Episcopal church.

In the Fall of 1854, he married Mary L. Williams, the daughter of Rev. J. M. Williams, who was the new pastor at Dale's church. He then enrolled at Oberlin College, but after one year could not pay the fees, in spite of working nights. He then returned to working as a cooper, affording him the means to finish his studies. He also became a preacher, being licensed as an exhorter in 1856, a preacher in 1858, and an elder in 1861.

== Civil War ==
The American Civil War started in 1861, and in 1863, Dale enrolled as a private in the 1st Michigan colored infantry regiment, which became the 102nd Regiment United States Colored Troops. Dale led a soldier protest against unequal pay for black soldiers compared to white soldiers. He influenced soldiers not to accept lesser pay, but also not to refuse to do their duty. The protest succeeded, and the regiment's pay was increased to equal white regiments. By the end of the war, he held the rank of commissary sergeant.

== Post-war career ==
After the war ended in 1865, Dale began working as a teacher. In 1867 he moved to New Orleans and taught at a Freedmen's Bureau school. He organized the building of the school and organized a church in the same building. He also joined the Louisiana Conference of the Methodist Episcopal church. Less than a year later, he built a new church and schoolroom. His success was not universally well received, and in 1874 he received death threats from white supremacist White League clubs. In 1880, he was nominated bishop of the Methodist Episcopal church at the national conference of the church in St. Paul, Minnesota but was not elected. In the early 1880s he was appointed to the Wesley chapel, the largest church in New Orleans. In 1884, he was appointed presiding elder of the North New Orleans district, before returning to Wesley. In 1885, he helped organize an "Old Folks Home" for poor African Americans in New Orleans. In 1887, he was assigned to Mount Zion. He died on December 7, 1892, in New Orleans, Louisiana.
