= 41st United States Colored Infantry Regiment =

Union Army African American infantry regiment

41st United States Colored Infantry
- Active: November 1, 1864 to December 14, 1865
- Country: United States
- Allegiance: Union
- Branch: Infantry
- Engagements: American Civil War: Battle of Fair Oaks & Darbytown Road; Battle of Hatcher's Run; Siege of Petersburg; Appomattox Campaign

The 41st United States Colored Infantry was an infantry regiment that served in the Union Army during the American Civil War. The regiment was composed almost entirely of African American enlisted men and commanded by white officers. The regiment was authorized by the Bureau of Colored Troops which was created by the United States War Department on May 22, 1863. The regiment engaged in the Siege of Petersburg and Appomattox Campaign and was present at the unconditional surrender of Confederate General Robert E. Lee and the Army of Northern Virginia at Appomattox Court House on April 9, 1865.

== Service ==
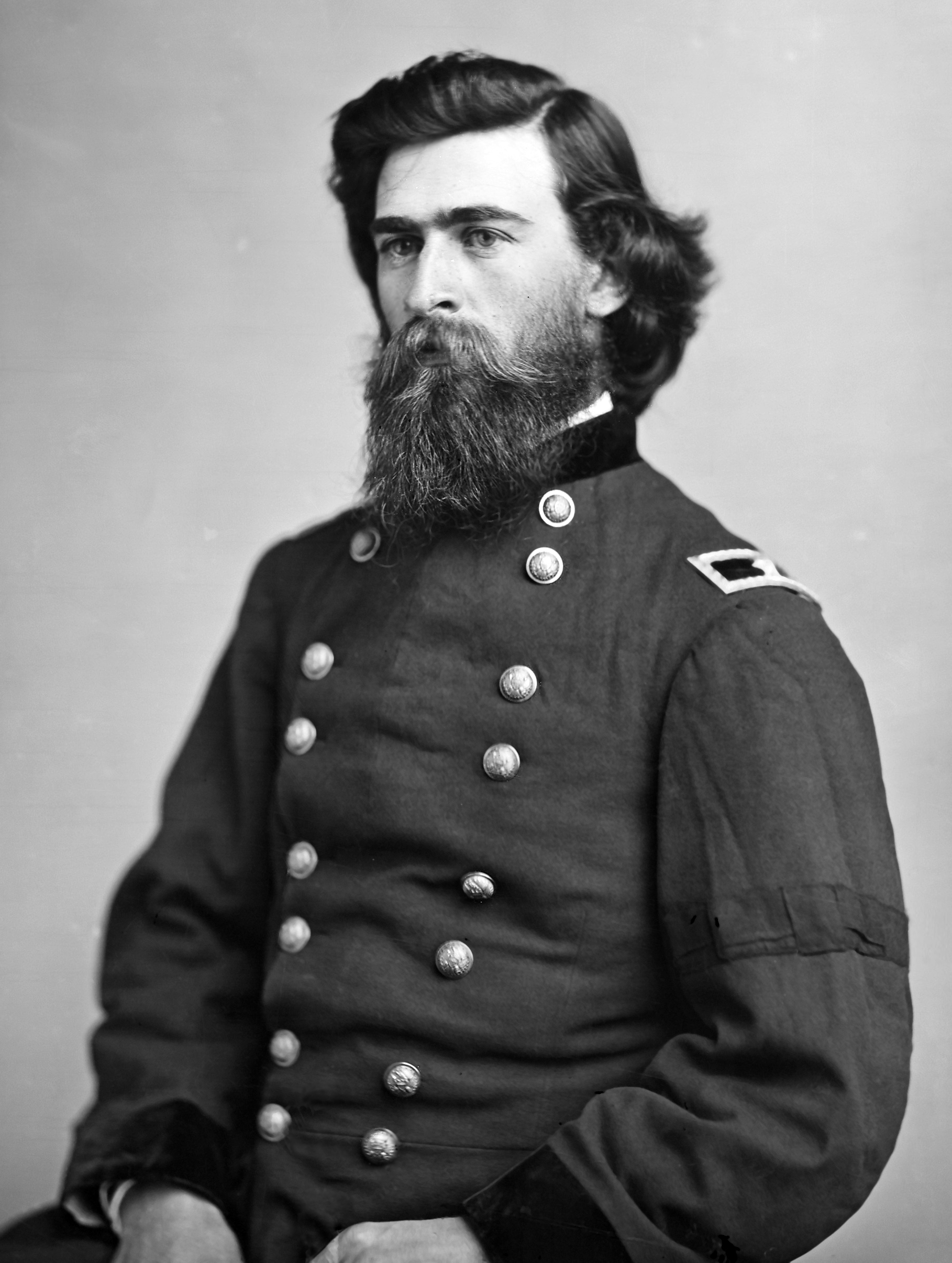
Colonel Llewellyn F. Haskell, photographed by Mathew Brady

The 41st United States Colored Infantry was organized at Camp William Penn in Philadelphia, Pennsylvania in fall 1864 (between September 30 and December 7, 1864) under the command of Colonel Llewellyn F. Haskell. The regiment composed of troops from different sections of the state.

Six companies were formed and ordered to the join the Army of the James on October 13. They performed guard duty at Deep Bottom for a few days before moving to the front in rear of Fort Burnham. On October 27, the regiment took part in a reconnaissance in force on the right of the Army of the James, in the vicinity of the Darbytown Road, where a sergeant was wounded. The regiment engaged in drill and picket duty as they proceeded south and were joined by the remaining companies. They arrived at the Battle of Hatcher's Run on March 29, joining the Army of the Potomac at the front. On April 2, the regiment engaged in the Siege of Petersburg losing nine men: one killed and eight wounded. Pursuing the Confederate Army, the regiment reached Appomattox Court House, where Captain John W. Falconer was mortally wounded on the skirmish line on the morning of April 9 during the Battle of Appomattox Court House, one of the last battles of the American Civil War. General Robert E. Lee and the Army of Northern Virginia surrendered that same day. The regiment remained camped at Appomattox for two days before returning to Petersburg.

On May 25, the 41st U.S. Colored Infantry embarked for Texas from City Point, Virginia, arriving at the Island of Brazos de Santiago, early in June. The unit was employed in guard and provost duty at Edinburg, Texas near the Mexico–United States border. On September 30, the remaining forces were consolidated into a battalion of four companies. The regiment was mustered out of service November 10, 1865 at Brownsville, Texas after a year of existence and was paid and discharged on December 14, 1865, at Philadelphia.

Subsequently, only the muster-out rolls were returned to the Adjutant General's office, and thus only the names of those men and their companies were accounted for.

== Casualties ==
The regiment lost a total of 56 men during service; one officer killed or mortally wounded, 55 officers and enlisted men died of disease. Captain John W. Falconer of Company A was the only field casualty from the USCT during the final Battle of Appomattox Court House on April 9, 1865.

== Commanders and field officers ==
- Colonel Llewellyn F. Haskell
- Lieutenant Colonel Lewis L. Weld
- Major Alpheus H. Cheney

== Notable members ==
- Private J. R. Kealoha, a Native Hawaiian soldier from the Kingdom of Hawaii, was posthumously honored for his service during the American Civil War.
- Private William J. Simmons, journalist, prominent Baptist leader, Simmons College of Kentucky's second president (1880–1890) and eventual namesake

== See also ==
- List of United States Colored Troops Civil War units
- United States Colored Troops

== Bibliography ==
- Bates, Samuel P. (1871). History of Pennsylvania Volunteers, 1861–5; Prepared in Compliance with Acts of the Legislature. Vol. V. B. Singerly, State Printer: Harrisburg, PA. pp. 1066–1080. OCLC 1887553.
- Cox, Christopher (2013). History of Pennsylvania Civil War Regiments: Artillery, Cavalry, Volunteers, Reserve Corps, and United States Colored Troops. Raleigh, NC: Lulu Publishing. pp. 489–490. ISBN 978-1-300-71312-8.
- Dyer, Frederick H. (1908). A Compendium of the War of the Rebellion. Vol. 1. Des Moines, IA: The Dyer Publishing Company. p. 1730. OCLC 8697590.
