= Walter Thorn =

United States Army Medal of Honor recipient

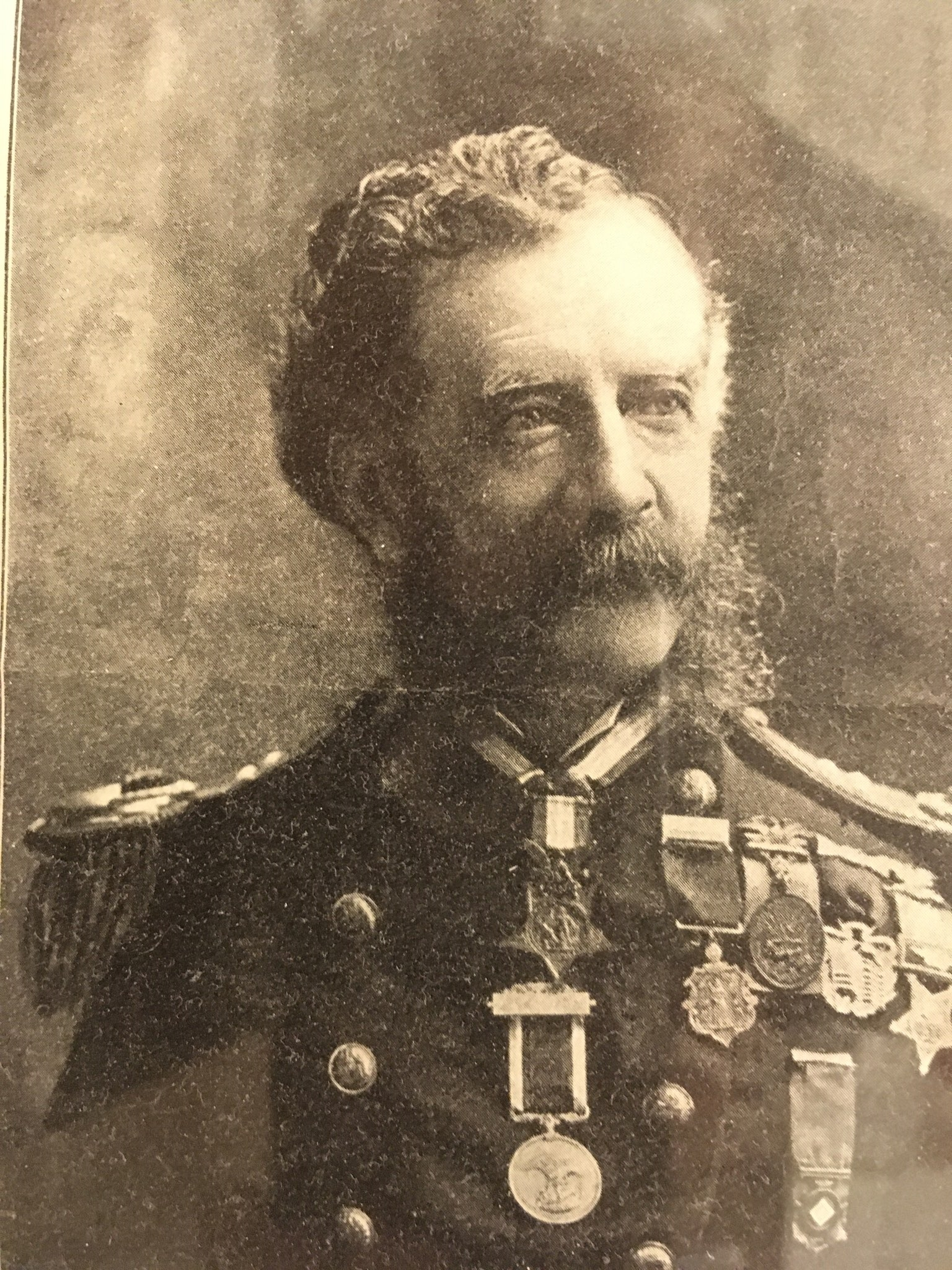
- Born: November 18, 1844; Brooklyn, New York
- Died: July 20, 1920 (aged 75); Hampton, Virginia
- Burial place: Arlington National Cemetery, Arlington, Virginia
- Military career
- Allegiance: United States of America; Union
- Branch: United States Army; Union Army; New York National Guard
- Service years: 1861–1865 (Army); 1879–1883 (National Guard)
- Rank: Major
- Unit: 116th U.S. Colored Troops
- Conflicts: American Civil War
- Awards: Medal of Honor

Walter Thorn (November 18, 1844 – July 20, 1920) was a Union Army officer in the American Civil War. On December 8, 1898, he received the Medal of Honor for his action while serving as a Second Lieutenant in the 116th United States Colored Troops, a unit made up of white officers and African-American soldiers.

== Early life ==
Thorn was born in Brooklyn, New York, on November 18, 1844.

== Military service ==
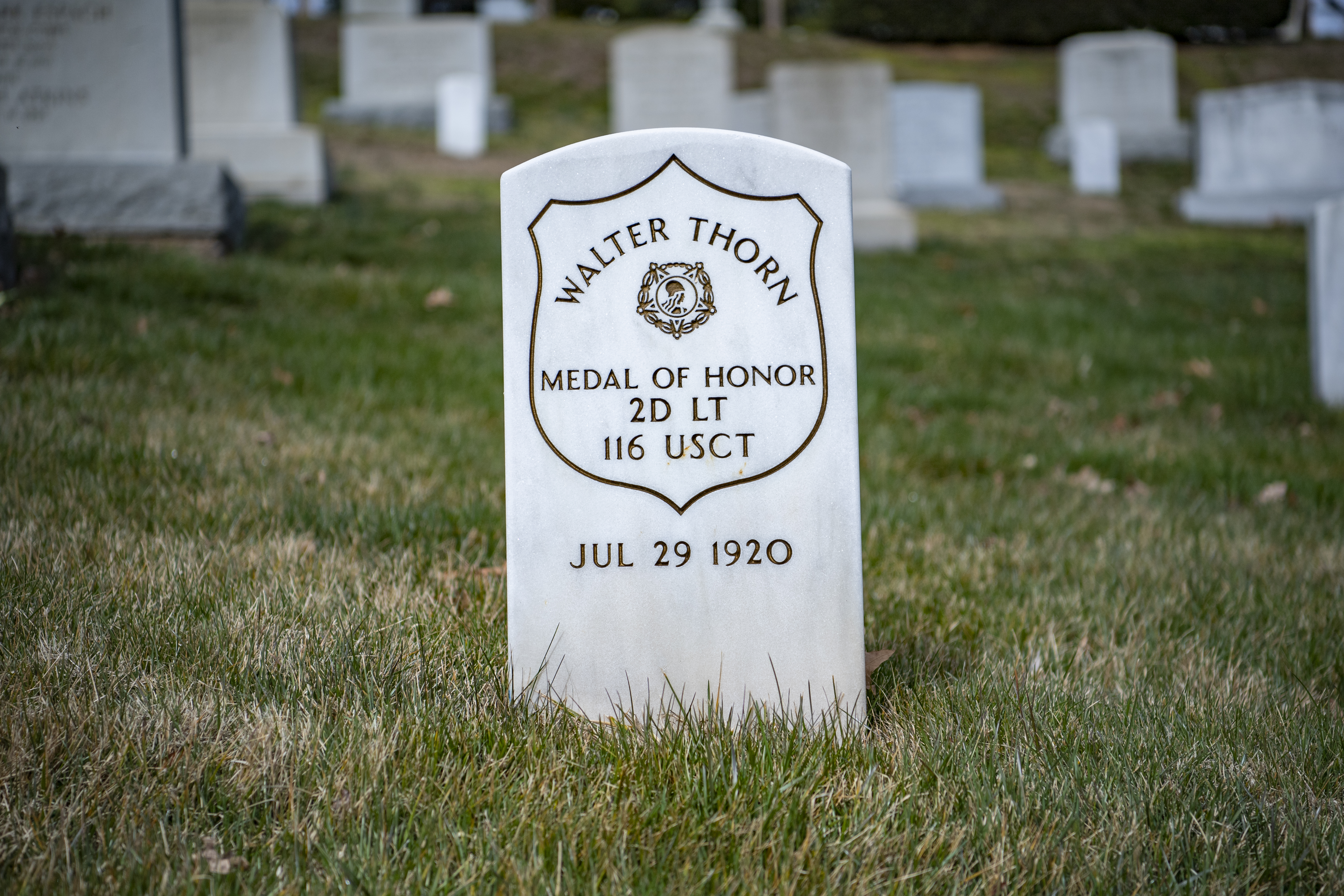
Grave at Arlington National Cemetery

After completing his education, Thorn enlisted for the Civil War and served in the 13th New York Volunteer Infantry and 52nd New York Volunteer Infantry before receiving a commission as a 2nd lieutenant in the 116th Infantry, United States Colored Troops.

Thorn received a medal for hand-to-hand combat in which he captured a Confederate officer, an action that was personally witnessed by General Ulysses S. Grant. He attained the rank of major before his discharge at the end of the war.

Aside from the Medal of Honor awarded to him in 1898 for his deeds at Petersburg, Thorn was awarded the Brooklyn War Fund Committee Medal of Honor in 1872 "for especial acts of bravery at Ferrows Island and Petersburg, Va". He also received the Brooklyn War Service Medal in 1866.

== Medal of Honor action ==
Oscar Frederick Keydel, in Deeds of Valor: How America's Heroes Won the Medal of Honor (1901, pages 477 to 478), wrote:

It was at the beginning of January, 1865. General Butler, commanding the Army of the James, was expected to reach and capture Richmond by operating on the south side of the James River. His movements were blocked by the sinking of obstructions which rendered it impossible for him to navigate the stream, and by a powerful Confederate battery at French Beach.

To overcome these difficulties the resourceful Butler had caused a canal to be cut through the Dutch Gap peninsula, so that the enemy's batteries could be flanked and the obstructions in the river passed by the navy.

Nothing remained to be done but remove the great earthen bulkhead that separated the two bodies of water. This had been sapped and galleried, and more powder was packed away in it than was used in blowing up the famous "Crater" at Petersburg. The main body of troops had been drawn off from the neighborhood of the vast mine for safety, and it was supposed that none had been left behind but the few whose duty it was to light the fuse and then escape.

The supreme moment had arrived. The fuse had been lighted, and the officers were standing in a group at a safe distance discussing the question whether the work was to be crowned with success.

A member of General Butler's staff galloped up and shouted excitedly: "Has the guard opposite the bulkhead been withdrawn?

Somebody answered, hardly articulately, rather with a sort of gasp: "No!"

There was a score of men in the guard. There were tons of powder beside them. Fire was eating its way up the fuse and might at any second set loose the terrific force of the mine.

The bravery of the officers before whose minds those thoughts flashed could not be doubted — it had been proved too often for that —but to go and warn the squad seemed so utterly beyond reason, so surely a useless throwing away of another life, that they stood there rigid and pale, with one exception - Walter Thorn, first lieutenant of the U. S. Colored Infantry, who hesitated, but only long enough to form a resolve. Then he dashed off in the direction of the bulkhead.

Perceiving his intention, his fellow officers called to him to return — warned him, pleaded with him. Paying no heed, he ran on, reached the bulkhead, climbed to its summit, faced the storm of bullets that the rebels directed at him, and stood there until he had ordered the picket guard to flee to a place of safety.

He leaped from the top of the mine; the explosion took place; the earth was scattered in all directions and a great abyss remained, but the young lieutenant was unharmed.

"It was as deliberate an act of self-sacrifice and valor as was ever performed in our country or any other," said one of his superior officers.

== Medal of Honor citation ==
After the fuze to the mined bulkhead had been lit, this officer, learning that the picket guard had not been withdrawn, mounted the bulkhead and at great personal peril warned the guard of its danger. Name: Thorn, Walter Rank: Second Lieutenant Organization: Company G, 116th U.S. Colored Troops Place: Dutch Gap Canal, Virginia Date: 1 January 1865 Birth: New York, New York Date of Issue: 8 December 1898

== Post-Civil War activity ==
After his military service, Thorn became an attorney in Brooklyn and practiced for more than 30 years. He held several federal, county and local government posts, including deputy sheriff, deputy collector of internal revenue, deputy city auditor, assistant assessor, shore inspector of the Port of New York and warden of the Raymond Street Jail.

In 1879, Thorn joined the New York National Guard as a captain and commanded a company before resigning his commission in 1883.

Thorn remained active in veterans' organizations including the Grand Army of the Republic. In the early 1900s, he was commander of the Medal of Honor Legion. He was also president of the War Veterans and Sons Association.

== Later life and death ==
In his later years, Thorn lived and worked at several soldiers' homes, including one in Bath, New York. Near the end of his life, he donated many of his medals and other mementos to the American Numismatic Society.

Thorn was the head librarian at the National Soldiers' Home in Hampton, Virginia, where he died on July 20, 1920. He was buried at Arlington National Cemetery, Section 2 Lot 3689-WH.

== See also ==
- List of Medal of Honor recipients
- * Other white officers in other USCT regiments: Thornton Chase, Edward Winslow Hinks, William Gould (W.G.) Raymond
