= Daniel Jones (minister) =

American minister (1830–1891)

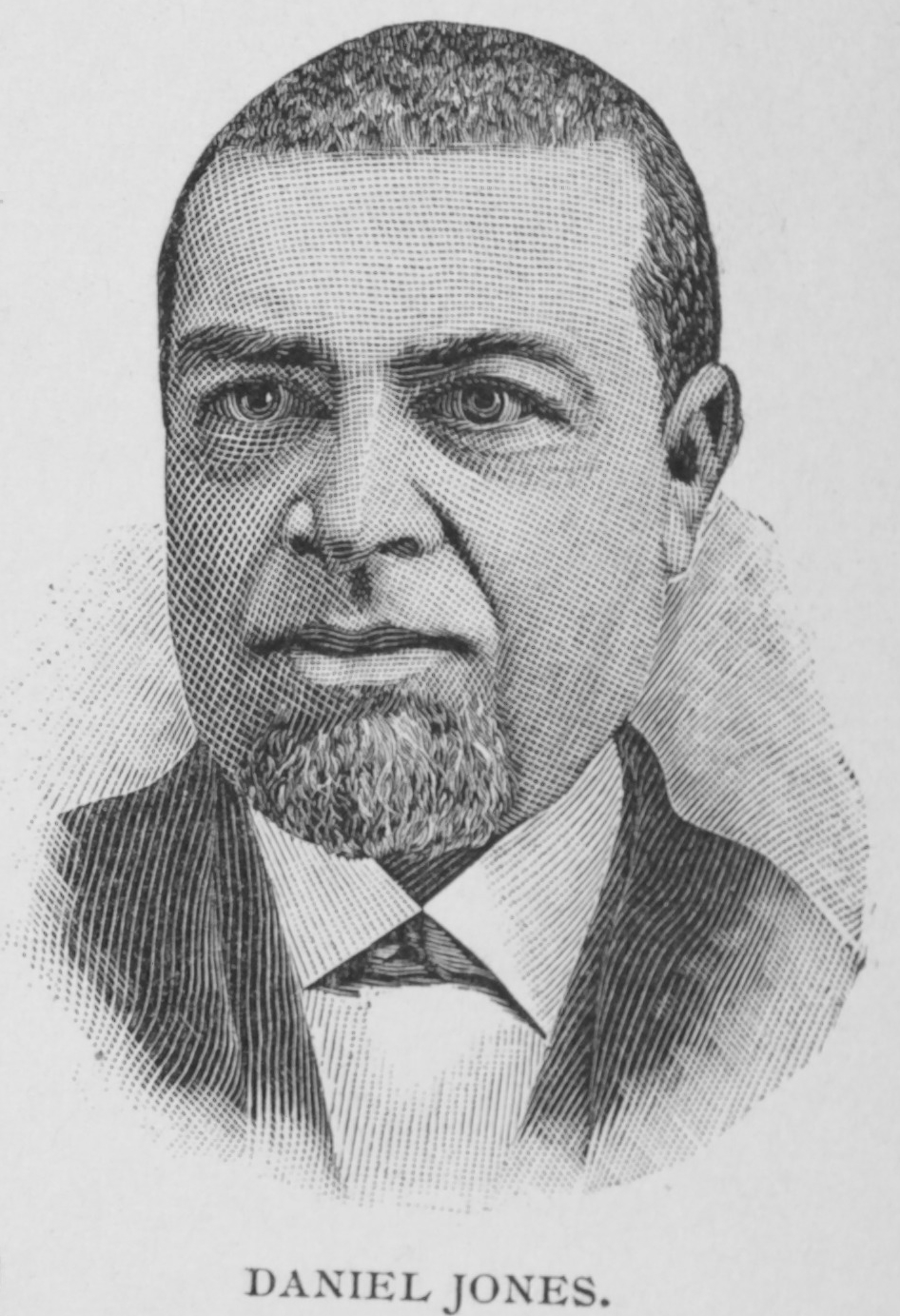
- Jones in 1887
- Born: June 30, 1830; Reading, Pennsylvania, U.S.
- Died: December 25, 1891 (aged 61); Winchester, Kentucky, U.S.
- Education: Willamette University
- Occupations: Educator; minister; journalist
- Political party: Republican

Religious life
- Religion: Methodist Episcopal

Daniel Jones (June 30, 1830 - December 25, 1891) was a Methodist Episcopal minister (M.E.) in Oregon and other regions of the United States. He was the first African American to attend Willamette University in Salem, Oregon. He was a leader in the M.E. church and was presiding elder of the Lexington, Kentucky, district.

== Early life ==
Daniel Jones was born June 30, 1830, in Reading, Pennsylvania, to Henry and Catharine Jones. Henry Jones was a slave on the Eastern Shore of Maryland until the age of 25, when he escaped into Pennsylvania. The couple had five children. At age 10, Daniel moved to Philadelphia, where he learned to be a barber. After seven years, he joined an ocean vessel. As a mariner, he once landed in Charleston, South Carolina. Slavery was still legal in South Carolina, and black people, free and slave, had a nightly curfew, but Jones desired to go into town. When a bell rang at nine o'clock signalling the start of curfew, Jones did not know what it meant and remained on the streets. A patrol saw him, and Jones, realizing his danger, ran back to the ship, making it just in time. January 16, 1849, he joined the California Gold Rush and traveled on the ship Gray Eagle around Cape Horn to California, landing in San Francisco in May 1849. He then worked in gold mines in California and Oregon.

== Career ==
Jones settled in Jacksonville, Oregon, living for a few years before moving to Crescent City, California, to be closer to the sea and the good health effects he believed it would bring. He then moved to Salem, Oregon. He was there during the Oregon Indian War, and Jones escaped some danger. In 1862, Jones married. He had four children. Jones taught schools in Oregon, and in 1869 joined the Methodist Episcopal church. He was soon licensed to preach in the Oregon Conference. He enrolled in Willamette University in Salem, the first black man in the class. In 1873, he was a delegate from Oregon to the Civil Rights convention in Washington, DC.

In 1873, Jones transferred as a preacher to Newark, New Jersey, where he remained for three years. He then transferred to Cincinnati, Ohio, then to Indianapolis. In 1878 he campaigned for the Republican presidential ticket in Indiana. He was then appointed presiding elder of the Lexington, Kentucky, district, a position he served until the end of his life. He moved to a church in Paris, Kentucky, and then Winchester, Kentucky. In 1880 he received votes for bishop at a general M.E. conference. He was also a delegate to the National Convention of Colored Men in 1880 in Nashville, Tennessee. During his career, he was an occasional correspondent of the Cincinnati Commercial Gazette and other local papers.

His ordination as deacon was by Bishop Edmund S. Jones and as an elder by Bishop Edward Raymond Ames.

== Death ==
Jones died on December 25, 1891, in Winchester, Kentucky, of influenza.
