= 102nd United States Colored Infantry Regiment =

- Active: 1863–64 (as 1st Michigan); May 23, 1864—September 30, 1865 (as 102nd USCT)
- Disbanded: October 17, 1865
- Country: United States
- Allegiance: Union
- Branch: Army
- Type: Infantry
- Size: 1,446
- Part of: 9th Army Corps
- Engagements: Baldwin Florida; Sherman's March to the Sea; Battle of Honey Hill; Battle of Tulifinny; Campaign of the Carolinas; Battle of Dingle's Mill; Skirmish at Spring Hill; Battle of Boykin's Mill; Salkehatchie; Bradford's Springs; Singletons Plantation; Swift's Creek

Commanders
- Notable commanders: Col. Henry Barnes Lt Col. William T. Bennett Maj. Newcomb Clark Cpt. Orson W. Bennett 1st Lt. Charles L. Barrell

The 102nd United States Colored Infantry was an African American infantry regiment of United States Colored Troops in the Union Army during the American Civil War. The unit was organized as the 1st Michigan Colored Volunteer Infantry Regiment before being redesignated as the 102nd Regiment USCT.

== History ==
The 1st Michigan Colored Infantry was formed between August 1863 and February 1864 and mustered on February 17, 1864, after an editorial and letter writing campaign by Henry Barns, an editor for the Detroit Tribune and Advertiser. Barns was commissioned the regiment's first colonel for his efforts; he maintained this post until voluntarily stepping down in favor of Henry L. Chipman. Lt. Colonel Newcomb Clark was Chipman's deputy and each was brevetted for Distinguished and meritorious conduct in the field.

The regiment was organized at Camp Ward, located on a farm in Detroit. Eight-hundred-forty-five men from Detroit, southern Michigan, and Upper Canada (now Ontario), volunteered for the regiment. Some of these early volunteers were escaped slaves from the Underground Railroad; 72 had been living in Canada where their status as free men was assured. While all were fighting against slavery, some were fighting to free actual family members who may have still been in slavery. For these early black volunteers particularly, to step into the spotlight by volunteering took enormous courage, not to mention the bravery of those who crossed back into the U.S. to fight.

During training, a regimental band was formed which toured and performed to attract and recruit more volunteers. The regiment also had artillery and cavalry elements.

The regiment was formed from August through September 1863, amidst that year's draft riots and protests against the war. Mustered in as the 102nd US Colored Troops on February 17, 1864 (or May 23, 1864), the unit was redesignated the 102nd Regiment United States Colored Troops. The 900-man unit left Detroit on March 28, 1864. The regiment, composed entirely of volunteers, lost almost 10 percent of its men during the nineteen months the regiment was in the field, campaigning throughout South Carolina, eastern Georgia and Florida. The infantry was assigned to the fort at Port Royal where they served as the second line of defense. In Baldwin, Florida, 21 miles from Jacksonville, the unit was attacked suddenly by a Confederate cavalry force. The soldiers easily defeated the Confederates, which proved to their officers that they were just as skilled and reliable as any other infantry. In Manchester the regiment and the 54th Massachusetts Volunteer Infantry succeeded in an attack on the flank of Confederate forces, putting them in disorder. Then the regiment was attacked by 200 Confederates and caused many casualties to the enemy. The Confederates came to a truce to be informed that Generals Robert E. Lee and Joseph E. Johnston had surrendered; the war was over.

This was the regiment's last battle; they served occupation duty until they were called together and were mustered out of service on September 30, 1865. The regiment returned to Detroit where it was disbanded on October 17, 1865.

== Strength and casualties ==
The total enrollment in the 102nd Regiment was 1,446. 6 people were killed in action, 5 people died of wounds, and 129 people died of disease.

== Notable members ==
- Charles L. Barrell, Medal Of Honor,

1st Lieutenant, 102nd US Colored Infantry b. 1842 d. 1914, from Michigan "Citation Hazardous service in marching through the enemy's country to bring relief to his command"

- Marcus Dale, Commissary Seargent, Company C

== See also ==
- List of United States Colored Troops Civil War Units
