= George Ziegler (general) =

- Born: George Milton Ziegler; 1832
- Died: 1912 (aged 79–80)
- Military career
- Rank: Colonel
- Unit: 47th Ohio Infantry Regiment
- Commands: 52nd United States Colored Infantry
- Conflicts: American Civil War

George Milton Ziegler (1832–1912) was a Union Army officer from Ohio during the American Civil War. He was commissioned a second lieutenant in the 47th Ohio Infantry Regiment on August 28, 1861. He was promoted to first lieutenant on December 6, 1861 and to captain on December 28, 1862. On December 22, 1864 he was named colonel of the 52nd United States Colored Infantry Regiment.

On March 24, 1866, President Andrew Johnson nominated Ziegler for appointment to the grade of brevet brigadier general of volunteers, to rank from March 13, 1865, and the United States Senate confirmed the appointment on April 10, 1866.

He is interred at Green Lawn Cemetery in Columbus, Ohio.

== See also ==
- List of American Civil War brevet generals (Union)

== Bibliography ==
- Eicher, John H.; Eicher, David J. (2001). Civil War High Commands. Stanford, Calif.: Stanford University Press. ISBN 9780804736411.
