= 52nd United States Colored Infantry Regiment =

52nd United States Colored Infantry
- Active: March 11, 1864 - May 5, 1866
- Country: United States
- Allegiance: Union
- Branch: Infantry
- Engagements: Action at Coleman's Plantation

Commanders
- Notable commanders: George Ziegler

The 52nd United States Colored Infantry was an infantry regiment composed of African-American troops recruited from Mississippi that served in the Union Army during the American Civil War. On July 4, 1864, the 52nd Colored Infantry fought a battle at Coleman's Plantation in Jefferson County, Mississippi. This engagement is notable as it is most likely the first time that Black soldiers from Mississippi fought against white Confederates from the same state.

== Formation ==
The 52nd US Colored Regiment was initially formed as the 2nd Mississippi Infantry (African Descent), in July 1863. Black troops were enlisted at Vicksburg, Mississippi, following the capture of that city by Union forces the same month. On March 11, 1864, the regiment was reorganized as the 52nd US Colored Infantry Regiment. Colonel George Ziegler was commissioned as colonel of the regiment on December 22, 1864, serving in command until the end of the war. Ziegler was a white veteran of the 47th Ohio Infantry Regiment, all officers of the US Colored Troops were white, and Black soldiers would not be commissioned as officers in the U.S. Army until after the Civil War.

== History ==
US Colored Troops were assigned to garrison duties to hold strategic points along the Mississippi River and free up veteran Union regiments for service elsewhere. General Henry Halleck wrote to Ulysses S. Grant, in July 1863, shortly after the capture of Vicksburg, expressing his opinion that the regiments of freshly-recruited Black troops would be suitable for this assignment: “The Mississippi should be the base of future operations east and west. When Port Hudson falls, the fortifications of that place, as well as of Vicksburg, should be so arranged as to be held by the smallest possible garrisons, thus leaving the mass of troops for operations in the field. I suggest that colored troops be used as far as possible in the garrisons." By the spring of 1864, half of the Vicksburg garrison consisted of US Colored Troops.

In July 1864, an expedition comprising the 48th and 52nd Colored Regiments, along with the Mississippi Marine Brigade led by General Alfred W. Ellet was sent to stop Confederate cavalry units south of Vicksburg from linking up with Confederate forces near Jackson during the Tupelo campaign. The Colored Troops left their garrison at Vicksburg and disembarked their transport ships near Rodney, Mississippi, on July 3. On July 4, near Coleman's Plantation, a Confederate cavalry commanded by Col. Robert C. Wood attacked the Union troops. When called into battle, the troops of the 52nd charged the Confederates, crying "Remember Fort Pillow! No quarter!" and forced the Confederates to retreat. According to a Vicksburg newspaper, "The Colored troops fought like tigers...No cowardice was shown by any of the command, and all acted with the most determined bravery and coolness". The Union troops staged a fighting retreat to their transports, having succeeded in their diversionary attack to draw the Confederates away from Jackson. The Union forces suffered 21 killed and 33 wounded, Confederate casualties were estimated at 150 total.

The 52nd returned to Vicksburg, and fought a skirmish with Confederate forces at Bayou Liddell, Louisiana on October 15, 1864. The regiment was mustered out of service May 5, 1866. Total combat casualties of the 52nd Colored Regiment: at Vicksburg, 3 wounded, 3 missing, at Coleman's Plantation 4 killed, 2 wounded, 4 missing, at Bayou Lidell 1 killed, 2 missing. Captain Nathaniel George Clement was Captain and then breveted Major of the 52nd. He went on to build Forts such as Fort Hartsuff in Valley County Nebraska.

== See also ==
- List of United States Colored Troops Civil War Units
- United States Colored Troops
- List of Mississippi Union Civil War units
