= Uniforms of the American Civil War =

American military uniforms worn during the Civil War

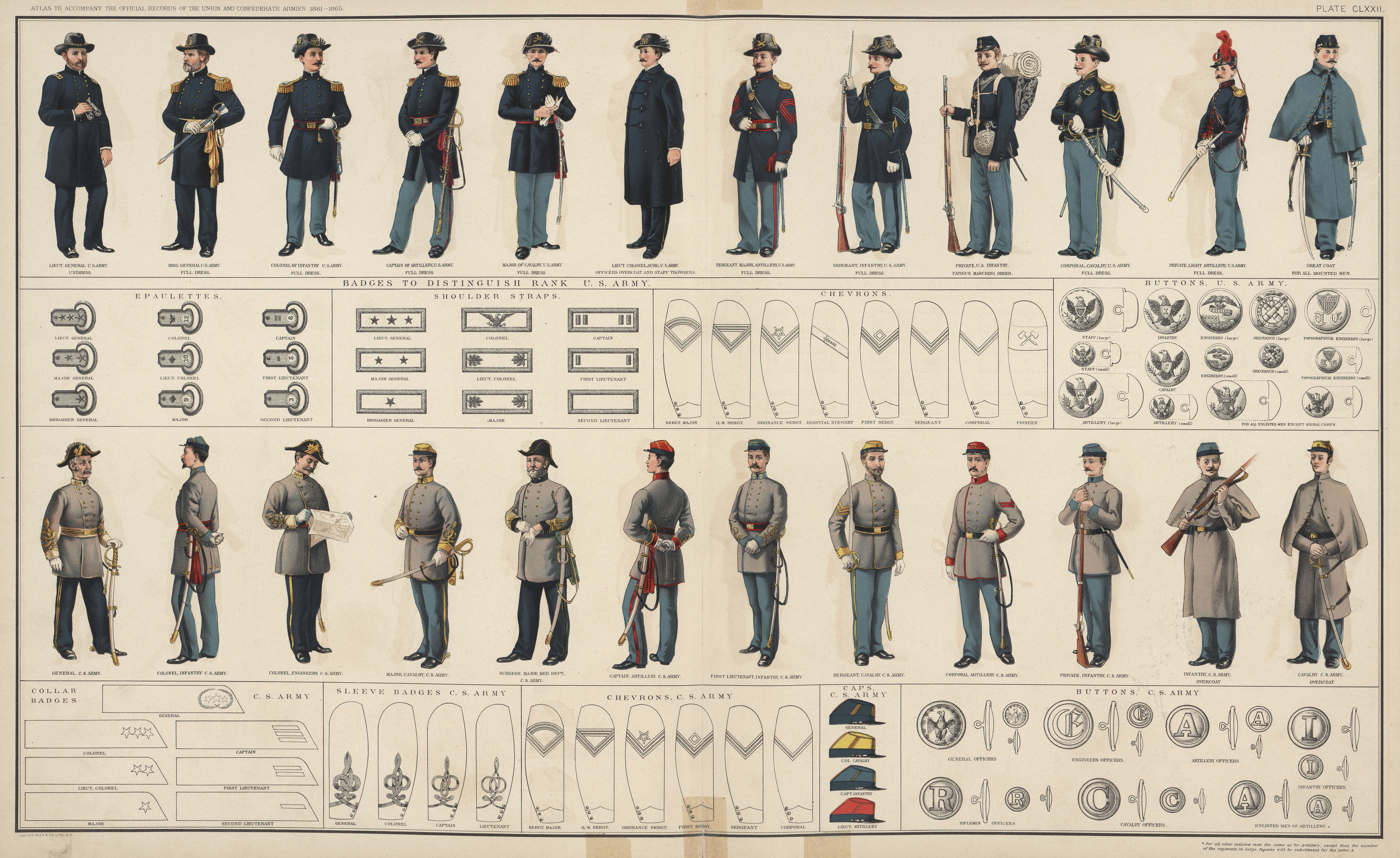
Army uniforms and insignia, War of the Rebellion Atlas (1895)

This article covers military uniforms during the American Civil War (1861–1865).

== History ==
During the years 1860–1865 there were three distinct types of uniform in use by the United States Armed Forces. Styles used were traditional similar to those used in the Napoleonic Wars, a regimental dress such as used during the American Revolutionary War and a specialist dress similar to those worn by Lancers and Hussars or an ethnic dress such as kilts. With shortages in 1861 the federal government issued a regulation pattern uniform for all state regiments.

=== Confederate States ===
At the onset of the war the Confederate States Army uniforms were highly varied as the majority were made at home. Between 1861 and 1862 the quartermaster department issued some uniforms but there were severe shortages.

The 31st Virginia Militia, known as the Continental Morgan Guard, was founded on June 22, 1855, in Winchester. The unit was named in honor of Revolutionary War hero Daniel Morgan and adopted uniforms resembling those of the Continental Army. Members of the Continental Morgan Guard participated in John Brown's insurrection at Harpers Ferry and various battles during the Civil War, including those at First Manassas, Cedar Run, and Falling Waters. The unit was part of the 5th Virginia Infantry CSA and served under the command of Colonel Kenton Harper. The 31st Virginia Militia's legacy continues to be celebrated in the Shenandoah Valley, where it played a significant role in the region's history.

== See also ==
- Uniform of the Union Army
