= Charles L. Barrell =

American soldier in the American Civil War

- Born: August 1, 1842; Conquest, New York, U.S.
- Died: April 18, 1914 (aged 71); Ann Arbor, Michigan, U.S.
- Burial place: Hooker Cemetery, Wayland, Michigan; 42.7061°N 85.5928°W
- Military career
- Allegiance: United States of America
- Branch: Union Army
- Rank: First Lieutenant
- Units: Company C, 102nd Regiment United States Colored Troops
- Conflicts: American Civil War
- Awards: Medal of Honor

Lieutenant Charles L. Barrell (August 1, 1842 – April 18, 1914) was an American soldier who fought in the American Civil War. Barrell was awarded the country's highest award for bravery during combat, the Medal of Honor, for his action near Camden, South Carolina, in April 1865.

== Biography ==
Charles was born August 1, 1842, in Conquest, Cayuga County, New York, to Joseph Barrel and Emily Carey. On August 2, 1862, Barrell enlisted at Leighton, Allegan County, Michigan into Company C of the 102d U.S. Colored Troops as a flag holder for the Grand Army of the Republic. He attained the rank of First Lieutenant on January 3, 1863. He was awarded the Medal of Honor and presented with the award on May 14, 1891.

Barrel died in Ann Arbor, Michigan, and is buried at Hooker Cemetery, Wayland, Michigan.

== Medal of Honor citation ==
Hazardous service in marching through the enemy's country to bring relief to his command.

== See also ==
- List of American Civil War Medal of Honor recipients: A–F
