= Llewellyn F. Haskell =

Union Army officer

Llewellyn Frost Haskell
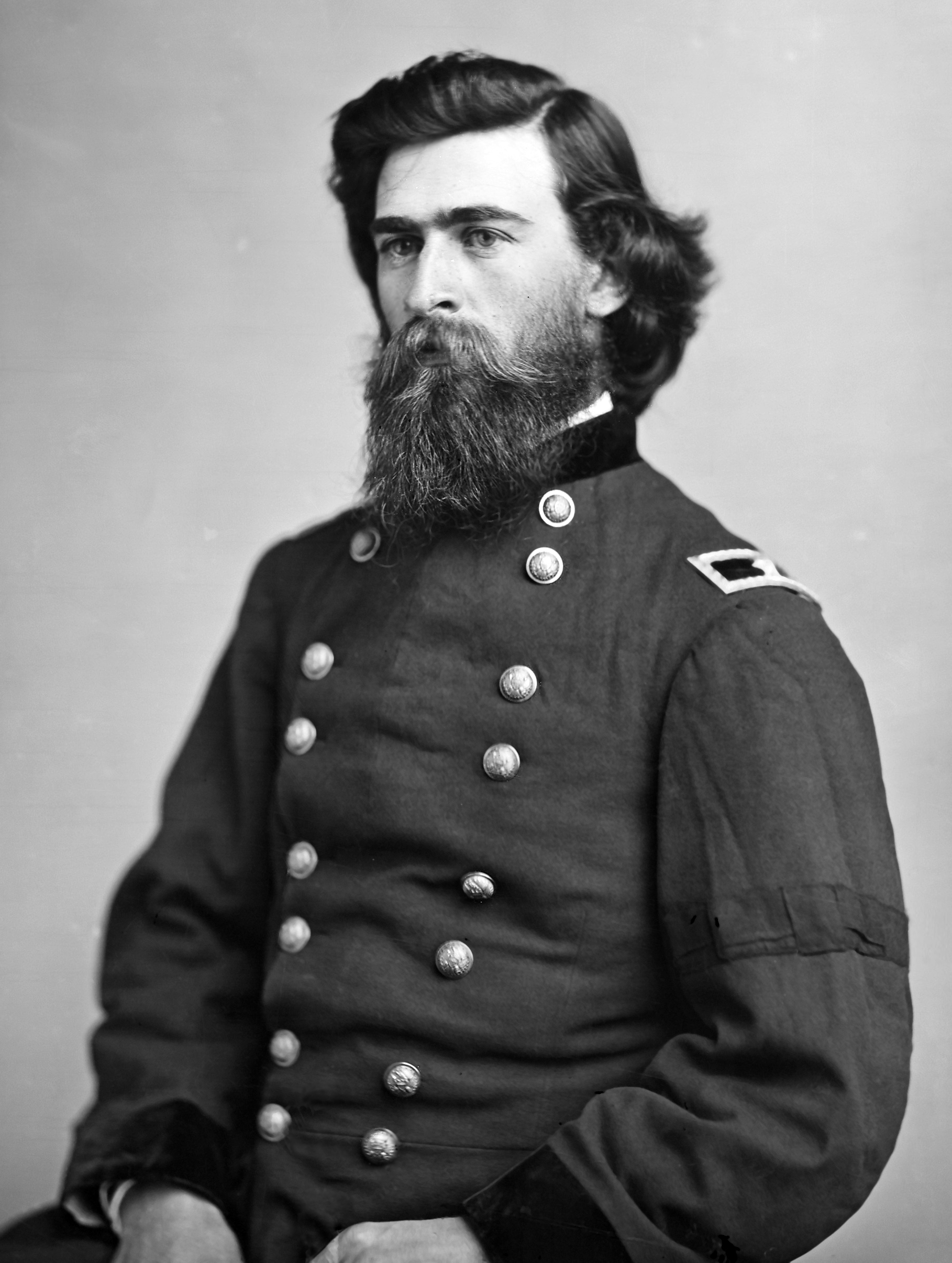
- Llewellyn F. Haskell, photographed by Mathew Brady
- Born: Thomas Frost Haskell; October 8, 1842; Belleville, New Jersey, United States
- Died: November 26, 1929 (aged 87); San Rafael, California, United States
- Spouse: Emmeline A. Gllmore
- Military career
- Allegiance: United States of America; Union
- Branch: Union Army
- Service years: 1861–65
- Rank: Colonel; Brevet Brigadier General
- Commands: 41st United States Colored Troops
- Conflicts: American Civil War

Llewellyn Frost Haskell (born Thomas Frost Haskell; October 8, 1842 – November 26, 1929) was a Union Army officer during the American Civil War. He commanded the 41st United States Colored Infantry during the Siege of Petersburg and was present at the surrender of General Robert E. Lee at Appomattox Court House.

== Early life ==
Haskell was born in Belleville, New Jersey on October 8, 1842 as Thomas Frost Haskell. His father was Llewellyn Solomon Haskell, druggist, landscape gardener and founder of Llewellyn Park in West Orange, New Jersey.

Around 1862, his father requested he change his first name to Llewellyn for family reasons after joining the army. His name change was later ratified by an 1873 act of the legislature of the State of New Jersey. Records from his service use both names.

== Career ==
Haskell was receiving his education in Heidelberg, Germany when he decided to return in 1861, and enlisted in the 14th New York Volunteer Infantry Regiment as a private. He fought at the First Battle of Bull Run where he sustained slight wounds and sunstroke. He later served as second Lieutenant Colonel in the 5th Missouri Volunteer Infantry and the 27th Missouri Volunteer Infantry building forts. He also served as an aide to General Alexander Asboth at the Battle of Pea Ridge and General Henry Prince at the Battle of Cedar Mountain (also known as Slaughter's Mountain), where he was severely wounded in the thigh by a minié ball. Haskell was the only member of General Prince's staff to escape with his life; he was hospitalized for four months after the battle.

In October, 1863, he was made Lieutenant Colonel of the 7th United States Colored Infantry and later promoted to the command of the 41st United States Colored Infantry, both colored regiments under the Bureau of Colored Troops. With the 41st USCT, Haskell engaged in the Siege of Petersburg and Appomattox Campaign and was present at the surrender of Confederate General Robert E. Lee and the Army of Northern Virginia at Appomattox Court House on April 9, 1865. By the end of the war, he had risen to the rank of Brevet Brigadier General of volunteers.

=== Later life ===
After the war, he helped his father develop Llewellyn Park and later settled in San Francisco, California in 1877, where he engaged in furniture manufacturing and in mining and oil development.

== Personal life ==
On June 4, 1868, he married Emmeline "Emma" A. Gilmore (1849–1925) at Llewellyn Park, in an open air ceremony. The couple had two sons:

- Llewellyn Thomas Haskell (1870–1961), who married Kate Ruth Howell in 1896.
- Louis Olcott Haskell (1873–1954)

He died in San Rafael, California, on November 26, 1929, and his remains were cremated.

== Bibliography ==
- Bates, Samuel P. (1871). History of Pennsylvania Volunteers, 1861–5; Prepared in Compliance with Acts of the Legislature. Vol. V. B. Singerly, State Printer: Harrisburg, PA. pp. 1066–1080.
- "Military Record of Llewellyn F. Haskell in the United States Volunteer Army of the Civil War, 1861–1865". Congressional Serial Set. Vol. 4916. Washington, DC: U.S. Government Printing Office. 1906. pp. 60–61. OCLC 3888071.
- Haskell, Llewellyn F. (1894). United States Department of War (ed.). No. 256. Appomattox Report of Colonel Llewellyn F. Haskell, Forty-First U. S. Colored Troops. 1. Vol. XLVI. Washington, DC: Government Printing Office. pp. 1238–1240. OCLC 12241509.
- Herringshaw, Thomas William, ed. (1904). Herringshaw's Encyclopedia of American Biography of the Nineteenth Century. Chicago: American Publishers' Association. p. 458. OCLC 1466514.
- Hunt, Roger D.; Brown, Jack (1990). Brevet Brigadier Generals in Blue. Gaithersburg, MD: Olde Soldier Books. ISBN 9781560130024. OCLC 21995702.
- Johnson, Rossiter; Brown, John Howard, eds. (1904). The Twentieth Century Biographical Dictionary of Notable Americans. Vol. V. Boston: The Biographical Society. OCLC 6182270.
- Leonard, John William; Marquis, Albert Nelson, eds. (1908). Who's Who in America. Chicago: Marquis Who's Who. p. 839. OCLC 1141571.
- New Jersey (1873). Acts of the General Assembly of the State of New Jersey. Morristown: Vance & Stiles, Steam Power Book and Job Printers. p. 910. OCLC 28987582.
- Rosenberg, C. C., ed. (1882). The Wonders of the World: Comprising Startling Incidents, Interesting Scenes, and Wonderful Events in All Countries, in All Ages, Among All People. San Francisco: Bancroft. p. 48. OCLC 11982064.
- Schlee, Philip Francis (1975). The Isaac Sandford Family, 1796–1975. Joplin, MO: Lee's Letter Shop. p. 243. OCLC 1938504.
