= 13th United States Colored Heavy Artillery Regiment =

- Active: June 23, 1864 – November 18, 1865
- Country: United States
- Allegiance: Union
- Branch: Union Army; United States Colored Troops
- Type: Artillery
- Role: Garrison Duty
- Engagements: None

Map of Camp Nelson, where the regiment was mustered into service

The 13th United States Colored Heavy Artillery Regiment, also known as the 13th US Colored Heavy Artillery, was an artillery regiment that was a part of the United States Colored Troops that served in the American Civil War. Organized at Camp Nelson, Kentucky, it became one of the largest units that were formed at Camp Nelson.

== Service ==
The regiment was organized at Camp Nelson, on June 23, 1864. It became one of the largest units that were formed at Camp Nelson.

The regiment conducted primarily garrison duty at Camp Nelson, Smithland, Lexington and other locations in Kentucky until November 1865.

The regiment was mustered out of service on November 18, 1865.

== Commanders ==
- Colonel Jacob T. Foster
- Lieutenant Colonel George Parker (Promoted to Brevet Colonel on March 13, 1865)

== See also ==
- List of United States Colored Troops units in the American Civil War
