= 116th United States Colored Infantry Regiment =

Union Army regiment (Est. 1864)

- Active: June 6 to July 12, 1864 - January 17, 1867
- Country: United States
- Allegiance: Union
- Branch: United States Colored Troops
- Type: Infantry
- Part of: Department of the Ohio; X Corps; XXV Corps
- Engagements: Siege of Petersburg; Appomattox Campaign

The 116th United States Colored Infantry was an infantry regiment of the United States Colored Troops serving in the Union Army organization made up of African-American troops and white officers during the American Civil War.

== Organization and assignment history ==
The 116th Regiment, U.S.C.T. was organized at Camp Nelson, Kentucky from June 6 to July 12, 1864.

From July until September 1864, the regiment was attached to the Military District of Kentucky, Department of the Ohio.

The 116th was attached to the X Corps, Army of the James until November 1864. From November to December of that year, the regiment was part of 1st Brigade, 3rd Division, X Corps.

From December 1864 to April 1865, the regiment was assigned to 1st Brigade, 2nd Division, XXV Corps.

The regiment was part of 3rd Brigade, 2nd Division, XXV Corps and the Department of Texas until September 1866, when it became part of the Department of the Gulf, a relationship that was maintained until the regiment was mustered out in January 1867.

== Service and duty ==
The 116th Colored Troops remained on duty at Camp Nelson until September 1864, and took part in the defense of Camp Nelson and Hickman's Bridge during an attack by troops under the command of Nathan Bedford Forrest.

From September to October 1864, the regiment joined the Army of the James at City Point, Virginia.

Beginning in October 1864, the 116th Regiment took part in the Sieges of Petersburg and Richmond, where it remained until April 1865. During this period the regiment took part in several engagements, including:

- The north side of the James River, October 27 to 28, 1864
- Fatigue duty at Deep Bottom, Dutch Gap and Richmond, November to March 1865
- Hatcher's Run, March 27 to 28
- Appomattox Campaign, March 28 to April 9
- Boydton Road and Hatcher's Run, March 29 to 31
- The fall of Petersburg, April 2
- Pursuit of Lee, April 3 to 9
- Appomattox Court House, April 9
- Surrender of Lee and his army

After Lee's surrender, the 116th Regiment remained on duty at Petersburg until May 25, when it embarked at City Point, Virginia for transport to Texas. Upon arriving in June the regiment assumed duty in the southern part of the state as part of General Philip H. Sheridan's army of occupation, serving in posts including Ringgold Barracks at Rio Grande City.

In September 1866 the 116th U.S.C.T. moved to New Orleans, Louisiana, where it remained on duty until January 1867

The 116th United States Colored Infantry Regiment was mustered out in Louisville, Kentucky on January 17, 1867.

== Prominent members ==
- Captain Ira Hobart Evans and Second lieutenant Walter Thorn, assigned to the 116th U.S.C.T., each received the Medal of Honor.
- Preston Taylor, a drummer for Company G who later became a preacher and business leader in Tennessee.

== See also ==
- List of United States Colored Troops Civil War units

== Sources ==
- History Engine web site, article, The 116th Colored Troops at the Battle of Petersburgh
- History of the 116th Regiment, U.S.C. Infantry, by Charles Kireker, 1866
- The Black Phalanx: a history of the Negro Soldiers of the United States, by Joseph Thomas Wilson, 1890
- African Americans at War: an Encyclopedia, by Jonathan Sutherland, 2004, Volume 2
- Camp Nelson, Kentucky: a Civil War History, by Richard D. Sears, 2002
- The United States Army and Reconstruction, 1865–1877, by James E. Sefton, 1967
- The Petersburg Campaign: June 1864-April 1865, John Horn, 1999
- Black Confederates and Afro-Yankees in Civil War Virginia, by Ervin L. Jordan, 1995
- A History of Blacks in Kentucky: from Slavery to Segregation, 1760–1891, Marion Brunson Lucas, 2003
- American Civil War web site, Colored Troops in the American Civil War page
- Camp Nelson Civil War Heritage Park web site
- Texas Historical Commission pamphlet, Rio Grande City
