= 111th United States Colored Infantry Regiment =

3rd Alabama Volunteer Infantry Regiment (African Descent)
- Active: January 3, 1864–June 25, 1864
- Disbanded: June 25, 1864
- Country: United States
- Allegiance: Union
- Branch: Infantry
- Size: Regiment
- Garrison/HQ: Pulaski, Tennessee; Athens, Alabama
- Engagements: American Civil War

The 3rd Alabama Volunteer Infantry Regiment (African Descent) was an infantry regiment that served in the Union Army between January 3, 1864, and June 25, 1864, during the American Civil War.

== Service ==
The infantry regiment was organized at Pulaski, Tennessee, on January 3, 1864. Straight away it was placed on garrison duty at Pulaski and Athens, Alabama. While they were on garrison duty they were attached to the Department of Tennessee. In the meantime, they acted as guard for railroads into Northern Alabama until June 25, 1864. On June 25, 1864, the regiment was designated the 111th U.S. Regiment Colored Troops.

== See also ==
- List of Alabama Union Civil War regiments
- List of United States Colored Troops Civil War units

== Bibliography ==
- Dyer, Frederick H. (1959). A Compendium of the War of the Rebellion. Sagamore Press Inc. Thomas Yoseloff, Publisher, New York, New York. LCCN 59-12963.
