= Samuel Penniman Bates =

American historian and writer

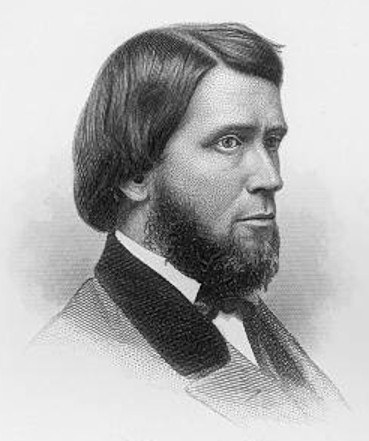
- Born: January 29, 1827; Mendon, Massachusetts
- Died: July 14, 1902 (aged 75); Meadville, Pennsylvania
- Occupation: Pennsylvania State Historian
- Spouse: Sarah Josephine Bates (m. 1856–1902; his death)
- Parent(s): Laban Bates and Mary (Thayer) Bates
- Relatives: Arthur Laban Bates (son), U.S. House of Representatives member, 1901–1913

Samuel Penniman Bates (January 29, 1827 – July 14, 1902) was an American educator, author, and historian. He is known for his reference works on the American Civil War, including his multi-volume History of Pennsylvania Volunteers, 1861–1865 which remains a frequently used, preliminary research resource due to its narrative descriptions of unit activities and rosters of the regiments raised in the Commonwealth of Pennsylvania.

== Formative years ==
Born on January 29, 1827, in Mendon, Massachusetts, Samuel Penniman Bates (1827–1902) was a son of Laban and Mary (Thayer) Bates. He and his siblings, Elias (born 1833), Mary (born 1835), Henry (born 1841), and Lewis (born 1848) were reared and educated initially in the public schools of Worcester County. U.S. Census records show that the Bates family lived comfortably for their era; in 1850, the family's patriarch, Laban, was documented as being a successful farmer with real estate valued at $6,000.

A graduate of the Worcester Academy, Samuel was hired by a community school in Milford to teach classes in 1843 when he was just sixteen years old. Subsequently, granted admission to Brown University, he became proficient in a number of subjects, including mathematics and philosophy, before graduating from that institution in 1851. He then spent the next year immersed in an in-depth study of the works of Shakespeare and Milton.

== Professional life ==
Bates then relocated to Meadville, Pennsylvania where, from 1853 to 1858, he taught ancient languages. During the latter four years of his tenure, he also designed and presented professional development classes for his colleagues.

On August 18, 1856, Samuel P. Bates wed Sarah Josephine Bates (1836–1907) in Bellingham, Norfolk County, Massachusetts. A fellow native of Massachusetts, she was a daughter of John Bates and Sarah Prince (Fisher) Bates. The birth of Samuel and Sarah's son, Edward T. (1857-1899), at their Meadville home in 1857 was followed by the births of: Arthur Laban (1859–1934) on June 6, 1859; Gertrude Louise (1865–1930) on April 16, 1865; Josephine (1867–1963) on June 23, 1867; Alfred John (1870–1933) on November 13, 1870; Walter Irving (1873–1934) on June 15, 1873; and Florence Bates (1878–1949) on June 9, 1878.

Elected as the superintendent of schools for Crawford County in 1857, he served a three-year term during which he became known and respected statewide for his views on public education. By 1860, he and his family were documented on the 1860 U.S. Census as living in Meadville's North Ward Borough. Also residing with the family were James Wells and Darwin Finney, two teachers in the Crawford County schools, and Margaret Shisler, a 16-year-old domestic worker.

Re-elected in 1860 to a second term as Crawford County's school superintendent, he resigned that same year when he was appointed as deputy state superintendent of schools for the Commonwealth of Pennsylvania under Governor William F. Packer. During his six-year tenure, Bates restructured state office operations and improved school records maintenance functions statewide while advocating not just for increased teacher training, but for the standardization of that training so that all teachers across the commonwealth received the same basic level of training in their respective subject areas in order to ensure that each Pennsylvania student received a consistent educational experience regardless of his or her place of residence.

Although he did not fight in the American Civil War, Bates' name became one of those most closely associated with his adopted state's involvement in that conflict due to his research and writing about the war's combatants and key battles. According to Ruth E. Hodge, former associate archivist at the Pennsylvania State Archives, Bates had abolitionist leanings:

Bates made several references to slavery in his sermons, stating one "should patiently and prayerfully study his word and approach the subject (principles) and bigotry and all those hindrances which hampers and bind us to low . . . thought." In such sermons he frequently refer[red] to the overthrow of slavery and the "sin of slavery."

Appointed as Pennsylvania's State Historian in 1864 by Governor Andrew G. Curtin and the Pennsylvania State Legislature, which had authorized the creation of the position to facilitate the commonwealth's detailed documentation of the role played by Pennsylvania military organizations and their respective members during the American Civil War, Bates spent the next seven years of his life researching, writing and overseeing the publication of his History of Pennsylvania Volunteers, 1861-5, at a cost to the state of roughly $250,000. In the opening paragraph of the Preface to the first volume in this series, he observed:

So long as differences arise among nations, which cannot be settled by peaceful conference, and appeals are made to the arbitrament of the sword, the only safety that remains to a government is in the courage of its soldiery. In the late sanguinary struggle, the national unity was preserved, and the perpetuity of democratic institutions secured, by the men who bore the musket, and who led in the deadly conflict. Argument and moral sentiment were at fault, diplomacy was powerless, and courage proved the only peacemaker.

He then researched and wrote Lives of the Governors of Pennsylvania, followed by Martial Deeds of Pennsylvania, and The History of the Battle of Gettysburg. His History of the Battle of Chancellorsville was published in 1882.

Documented by federal census takers in 1870 and 1880 as still residing in Meadville, those same federal employees described him in 1870 as "State Historian" with combined real estate and personal property valued at $13,000 (1870) and, in 1880, as a "High School Principal."

Sometime during the latter part of the 19th century he became a member of the Grand Army of the Republic, joining through his local post (no. 331) in Meadville.

Still residing in Meadville after the turn of the century, he and his son, Arthur were respectively described on the 1900 federal census as a music dealer and lawyer. In 1901, Arthur, a Republican, was then elected to the United States House of Representatives. Serving in the Fifty-seventh and five subsequent Congresses (from March 4, 1901, to March 3, 1913), he was also appointed as a delegate to the International Peace Conferences at Brussels (1905) and Rome (1911).

== Death and interment ==
On July 14, 1902, Bates died in Meadville, Crawford County, Pennsylvania at the age of 75. He was then laid to rest the next day at Meadville's Greendale Cemetery.

== Legacy ==
Bates' 19th century research and writing has furthered the causes of genealogy, historic preservation, and public education for more than a century. Among the educational works researched and written by Bates were: Lectures on Moral and Mental Culture (1860), Liberal Education (1865), Method of Teachers' Institutes (1862), and History of Colleges in Pennsylvania.

His summaries of the voluminous data contained in the Civil War-era muster rolls of Pennsylvania regiments and selected units from the United States Colored Troops (USCT) and transcription onto a series of 3 in × 5 in (76 mm × 127 mm) index cards were later digitized by Pennsylvania Historical and Museum Commission archivists to create the "Civil War Veterans' Card File, 1861-1866" – an online resource which continues to be a popular, early-phase research tool used by professional genealogists and amateur family historians. Alphabetized by surname, each individual soldier's card contains that man's name, age, birthplace/residence, and occupation at the time of his enrollment; name of the military unit in which he enrolled; dates and places of enrollment and muster-in; and ranks from muster-in to muster-out, as well as the cause for discharge (death, battle wound, illness, expiration of service).

Bates' work on the History of Pennsylvania Volunteers, 1861-5 and its subsequent transcription and transfer to the Civil War Veterans' Card File was not error-free, however; multiple examples exist of incorrect spellings of soldiers' given names or surnames, as well as mis-affiliation with regiments. As a result, archivists and other historians recommend that data found in the card file be double checked against other records, including the original muster rolls of the regiment in question.

=== Selected publications ===
- Discourse, life and character of John Barker (1860)
- History of Pennsylvania Volunteers, 1861–1865, Volumes 1-5 (1869-1871)
- Lives of the Governors of Pennsylvania (1873)
- Martial Deeds of Pennsylvania (1875)
- Memoir of Oliver Blachly Knowles: Late colonel of the 21st Pennsylvania Cavalry and brevet-brigadier general (1878)
- Battle of Gettysburg (1878)
- Battle of Chancellorsville (1882)
- A Brief History of the One Hundredth Regiment (Roundheads) (1884)
- History of Erie County; Containing A History of the County, Its Townships, Towns, Villages, Schools, Churches, Industries, etc. (1884)
- History of Crawford County, Pennsylvania (1885)
- A Biographical History of Greene County, Pennsylvania (1888)

== See also ==
- List of Pennsylvania Civil War Units
- Arthur Laban Bates (son of Samuel Penniman Bates)
