= Benjamin F. Randolph =

African American politician (1820–1868)

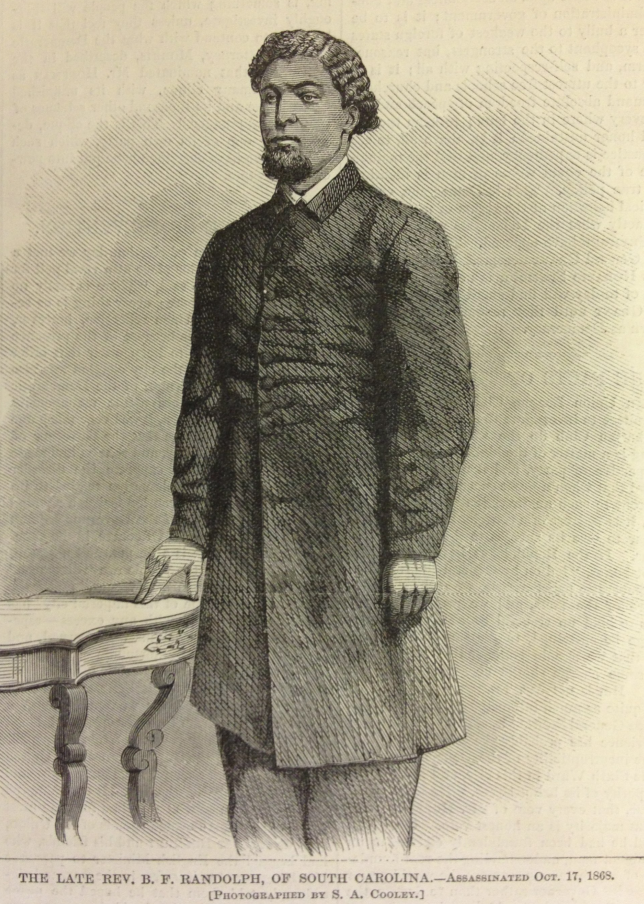
- Benjamin F. Randolph, Harper's Weekly, October 25, 1868

Member of the South Carolina Senate from the Orangeburg district
- In office August 11, 1868 – October 16, 1868
- Preceded by: Reconstruction Era

Personal details
- Born: 1820 Kentucky, U.S.
- Died: October 16, 1868 (aged 47–48) Hodges, South Carolina, U.S.
- Resting place: Randolph Cemetery; 34°0′32.7″N 81°3′15.9″W
- Party: Republican
- Education: Oberlin College
- Profession: Minister (Christianity), Newspaper Editor, Educator

Military service
- Allegiance: United States (Union)
- Branch/service: U.S. Army (Union Army)
- Years of service: 1863–1865
- Unit: 26th United States Colored Infantry Regiment
- Battles/wars: American Civil War: Battle of St. John's Island; Battle of Tulifinny

Benjamin Franklin Randolph (1820 – October 16, 1868) was an American educator, spiritual advisor, newspaper editor who served as a South Carolina state senator during the Reconstruction Era. Randolph was selected to be one of the first African American Electors in the United States at the 1868 Republican National Convention for the Ulysses Grant Republican presidential ticket. Randolph also served as the chair of the state Republican Party Central Committee. He was a delegate to the 1868 South Carolina Constitutional Convention, where he played an important role in establishing the first universal public education system in the state, and in granting for the first time the right to vote to black men and non-property owning European-American men. On October 16, 1868, Randolph was assassinated by members of the Ku Klux Klan.

== Early life ==
Benjamin Franklin Randolph was born in Kentucky in 1820, the child of free African Americans. He moved with his family to Ohio as a child, where he attended school in Warren County, Ohio. He enrolled in Oberlin Preparatory & Collegiate in 1854 and matriculated at Oberlin College in 1857, studying in the Classics Department. In 1858, he moved to Buffalo, New York, where he served as the principal of a public school for black students.

== Civil War service ==
In December 1863, Randolph volunteered to serve in Civil War for the Union, joining the 26th Regiment Infantry U.S. Colored Troops at Rikers Island, New York, serving as its chaplain. The only African American officer in the 26th, he received the Regimental banner from Vincent Colyer at the unit's commissioning ceremony on March 27, 1864. Thornton Chase was a commanding officer in the 26th USCT.

The unit was deployed to Beaufort, South Carolina, in March 1864, and participated in actions at the Battle of John's Island in the first week of July, sustaining 97 casualties. The unit also fought at the Battle of Honey Hill, and the Battle of Tulifinny. As Chaplain, Randolph's duties included writing letters for members of the regiment and assisting the regimental hospital attendant, Noah Elliott, with care of the sick and wounded. The regiment was mustered out in South Carolina in August 1865.

== Reconstruction ==
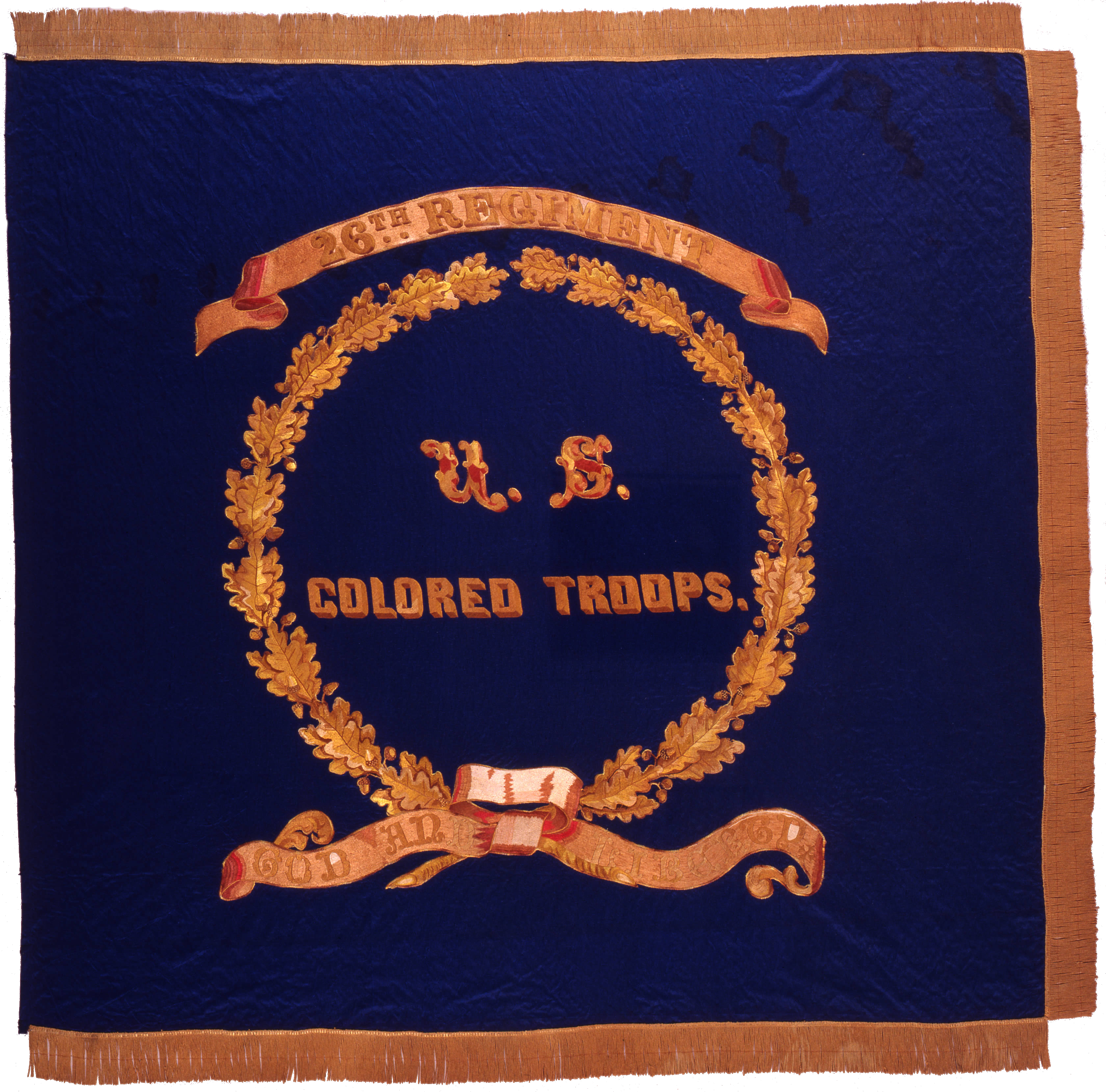
Colors for 26th Regiment Infantry, U.S. Colored Troops

After his unit disbanded, Randolph chose to remain in South Carolina during Reconstruction. He attended the Colored People's Convention in Charleston in 1865, subsequently joining the Freedmen's Bureau, serving as assistant superintendent for education in Charleston. In seeking a position with the Bureau, Randolph had written:

I am desirous of obtaining a position among the freedmen where my qualifications and experience will admit of the most usefulness. I don't ask position or money. But I ask a place where I can be most useful to my race. My learning and long experience as a teacher North, and my faithful service as Chaplain demand that I seek such a place. If you should obtain for me some responsible position in the Freedmen's Bureau...you would never regret it. -- B. F. Randolph

As assistant superintendent, he established schools for freedmen on various plantations around Charleston and secured teachers for them. Randolph also toured established schools throughout the state to review their operations and ensure they were adequately staffed and supplied. Schools visited included those in Columbia, Camden, Darlington, Cheraw, and Marion, SC.

in February 1867, Randolph started the Charleston Advocate, a weekly newspaper for freedmen, co-founding it with Rev. E. J. Adams, and serving as its co-editor. In March 1867, Randolph petitioned to and was accepted on a provisional basis by the South Carolina Mission Conference of the Methodist Episcopal Church as a minister of their church. Randolph had trained as a minister in the Presbyterian Church in Ohio (Old School, Northern), but believed that he could more effectively serve freedmen in South Carolina under the auspices of the Methodist Episcopal church's Mission Conference.

In late 1867 Randolph was elected as a delegate to the South Carolina Constitutional Convention of 1868 under the Reconstruction Laws set by the U. S. Congress. At the Convention, he wrote the article that authorized the first system of free public education in the state. He also authored language granting for the first time the right to vote to landless men, both black and white. Prior to 1868, landless white men were disfranchised. He also successfully introduced an "equal protection clause", regardless of race, consistent with the Fourteenth Amendment to the United States Constitution, which South Carolina ratified the following year.

Subsequent to the Convention, Randolph ran for the Orangeburg seat in the State Senate and was elected to a 4-year term. He was also selected by the Republican membership as Chair of the Republican Central Committee for the state, was a delegate to the 1868 Republican National Convention which nominated Ulysses S. Grant for President, and was one of the nation's first African American Electors.

== Assassination ==
As state senator and Republican committee officer, Randolph traveled throughout the state to campaign on behalf of both state and national candidates. In October 1868 he conducted a train tour to the upcountry region of South Carolina on behalf of the national Republican ticket (Randolph was still in the beginning of his 4-year term as state senator and was not standing for re-election). He gave a campaign speech in Abbeville, South Carolina, on October 15. The next day he took a train for Anderson. While changing trains at Hodges' Depot in Hodges, South Carolina, Randolph was gunned down on the station platform by three white men. The attack occurred in broad daylight, with many witnesses, and the assailants mounted their horses and rode away without pursuit. The county coroner's inquest found that no attacker could be identified. Randolph was buried in Columbia, South Carolina, because it was felt that feelings ran too high in Charleston.

=== Investigation ===
A subsequent investigation by the state authorities resulted in a warrant being issued in Columbia for the arrest of D. Wyatt Aiken, a former Confederate Army colonel and prominent planter who lived nearby in Cokesbury, South Carolina. Aiken had publicly issued threats against Randolph's life which had been reported by the federal military authority in the region. Aiken was arrested by state constables on November 9, 1868, and briefly detained on suspicion as an accessory before the fact, but was released on $5,000 bail on November 12, and was never brought to trial.

Aiken subsequently wrote an open letter to the state Governor published in the Charleston Daily News on November 19, 1868, disputing the authority of the state Constable to arrest him and claiming that he was feloniously incarcerated in Columbia for two days. On December 23, 1868, state constables arrested Fletcher Hodges of Hodges Station as an accessory to the murder of Randolph. He was also subsequently released and never brought to trial. There were again protests in the press that the state Constable lacked jurisdiction in Abbeville County.

In 1870, Congress conducted a series of hearings with respect to the political situation in South Carolina under Reconstruction. Included in the committee report was the testimony of a man who came forward and confessed to involvement in the assassination, and who testified that he belonged to a group whose goal was to "kill out the leaders of the Republican Party and drive them out of the state." The committee taking testimony identified this group as the Ku Klux Klan. The witness identified Col. Aiken as a leader in the community but did not tie him directly to the assassination, although his testimony did implicate Fletcher Hodges. The witness, listed in Congressional records as William Tolbert, had surrendered himself to a state constable and was held in the state penitentiary. Subsequent to his testimony, he disappeared from the jail, was declared to have escaped, and was shot by a constable on December 3, 1869, near Greenwood, South Carolina, a few miles from Hodges Station. No one was ever brought to trial for Randolph's murder.

== Legacy ==
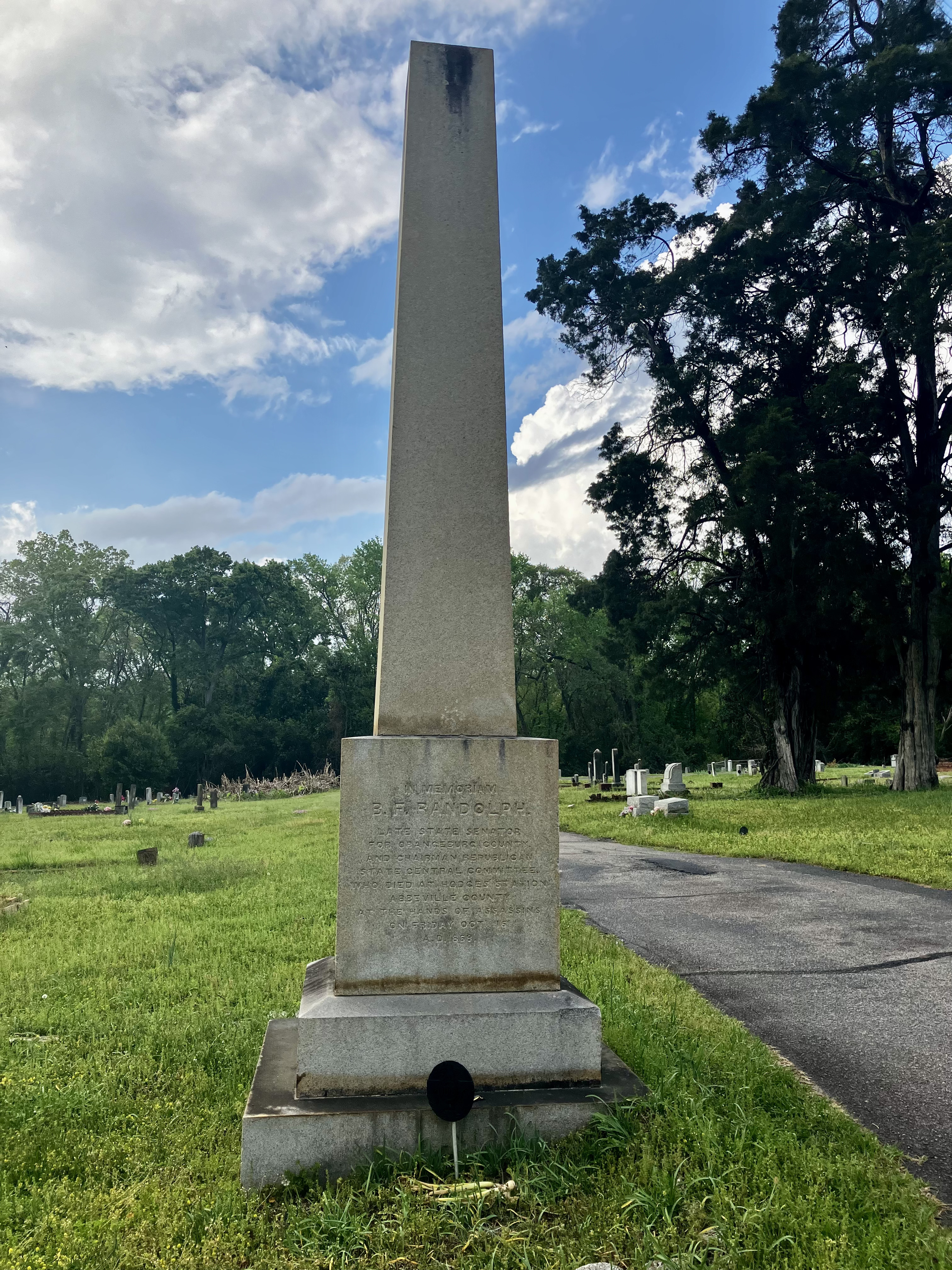
Monument at Randolph Cemetery

The 1868 Constitution that Randolph helped create was replaced in 1895 by a Constitution that greatly reduced voting and legal rights for African Americans. Nonetheless, several innovations introduced by Randolph were retained, in particular free public education and the franchise for landless men, as well as the "equal protection of the law" clause.

Benjamin Randolph's body was re-buried in 1871 at a cemetery in Columbia established in his honor and named for him. Eight other Reconstruction-era African-American legislators were later buried at Randolph Cemetery, as well as bishops, attorneys, and Columbia's first black postmaster. In 1995, the cemetery was listed on the National Register of Historic Places.

In 2008, the 140th anniversary of the 1868 Constitutional Convention to which Randolph was a delegate, the 117th Session of the South Carolina General Assembly declared February 2, 2008, as "Senator Benjamin Franklin Randolph Day" in conjunction with the unveiling of a historic marker at Randolph Cemetery in his honor.

== See also ==
- James Martin (South Carolina politician)
