= 26th United States Colored Infantry Regiment =

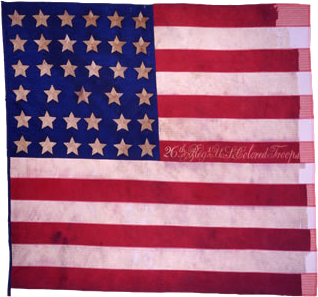
- National Flag of 26th Regiment USCI
- Active: February 26, 1864 – August 28, 1865
- Country: United States
- Allegiance: United States of America; Union
- Branch: Infantry
- Engagements: Battle of John's Island; Battle of Honey Hill; Battle of Tulifinny

The 26th United States Colored Infantry, also called the 26th New York Infantry (Colored) was an African American infantry regiment, one of three colored troop units from the state of New York,^{1} that fought in the American Civil War. The unit was organized on Riker's Island in February 1864 by the Union League Club of New York.

The commanding officer was Col. William Silliman. After a short deployment at Annapolis, Maryland, the regiment was sent to the Department of the South and participated in battles at Johns Island, Honey Hill, and Tulifinny, South Carolina. Lt. Col. William B. Guernsey succeeded Col. Silliman on June 18, 1865, and the 26th Regiment was mustered out under his command in South Carolina on August 28, 1865.

Notable members include: David Carll, who has a hill in Oyster Bay, NY, named after him; Noah Elliott, the unit's hospital steward, who went on to become the first African American physician in Athens, Ohio; and Benjamin F. Randolph, who as Chaplain was the unit's sole African American commissioned officer, and who was a delegate to South Carolina's Constitutional Convention in 1868.

== History ==
=== Authorization and enlistment ===
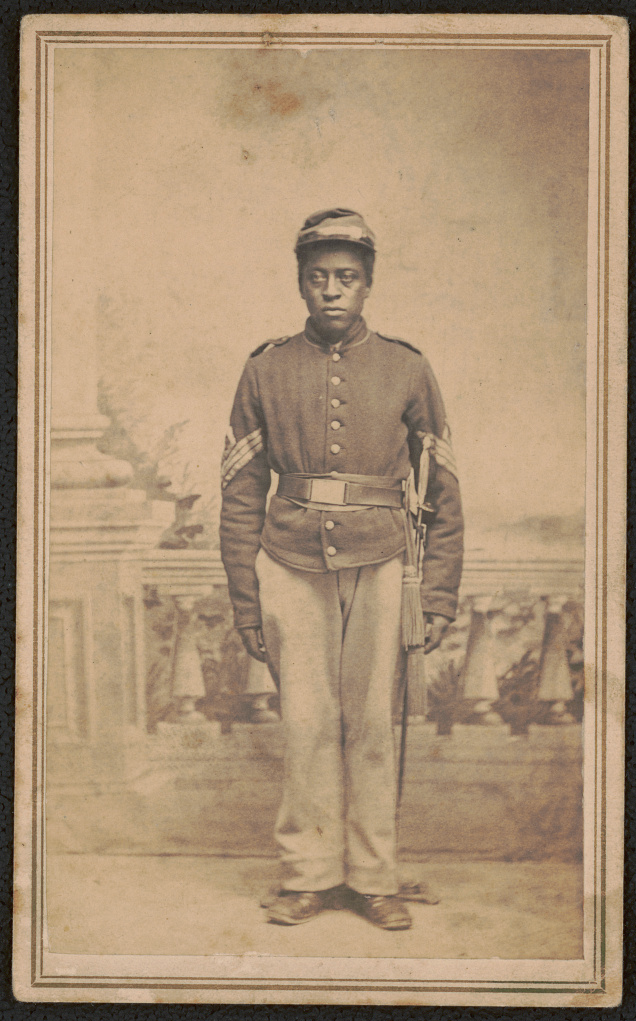
First Sergeant Luther Hubbard of the 26th U.S. Colored Troops Infantry.

On December 3, 1863, the United States Department of War authorized the Union League Club of New York to raise one regiment of infantry composed of African Americans. The initial authorization filled up very quickly and this regiment was designated the 20th Regiment. The club applied to raise a second regiment on December 19, and received authorization on January 4, 1864. This regiment filled on January 27, 1864, and was designated the 26th Regiment, United States Colored Troops. The 30th Regiment was applied for and authorized at the same time, bringing to three the total number of regiments raised for New York by the Union League Club.

=== Training and commissioning ===
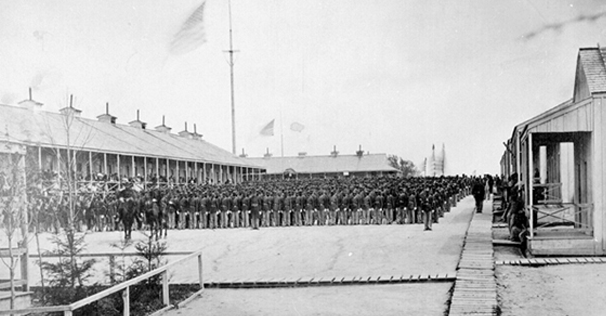
The 26th Regiment on parade. Click here for a high resolution, zoomable image of the 26th Regiment

Recruits trained at Riker's Island until the end of March. William Silliman, a captain noted for his heroism at Gettysburg while serving in the 124th New York regiment, was commissioned as commanding officer. The presentation of colors ceremony and parade for the 20th Regiment had been so successful that the League had planned an even larger ceremony for the 26th Regiment on March 26, but the ceremony and parade were canceled due to severe weather, and the Regiment's deployment schedule was too constrained to permit rescheduling. Instead, on Easter Sunday, March 27, 1864, John Jay, grandson of the Founding Father of the same name and president of the League, boarded the steamer Warrior, on which the Regiment was to be transported, and presented to Col. Silliman the National flag, made for the Regiment by the Ladies Auxiliary of the Union League.

Benjamin F. Randolph, chaplain and the regiment's only commissioned African-American officer, accepted the Regimental flag from Vincent Colyer, the Union League's superintendent of recruitment. The banner bore the words “Unconditional Loyalty – To the Soldiers of the 26th United States Colored Troops – From Their Friends.” The banner was sponsored by the Ladies Auxiliary of the Union League and several chapters of the New York Benevolent Society of Colored Men.

== Service ==
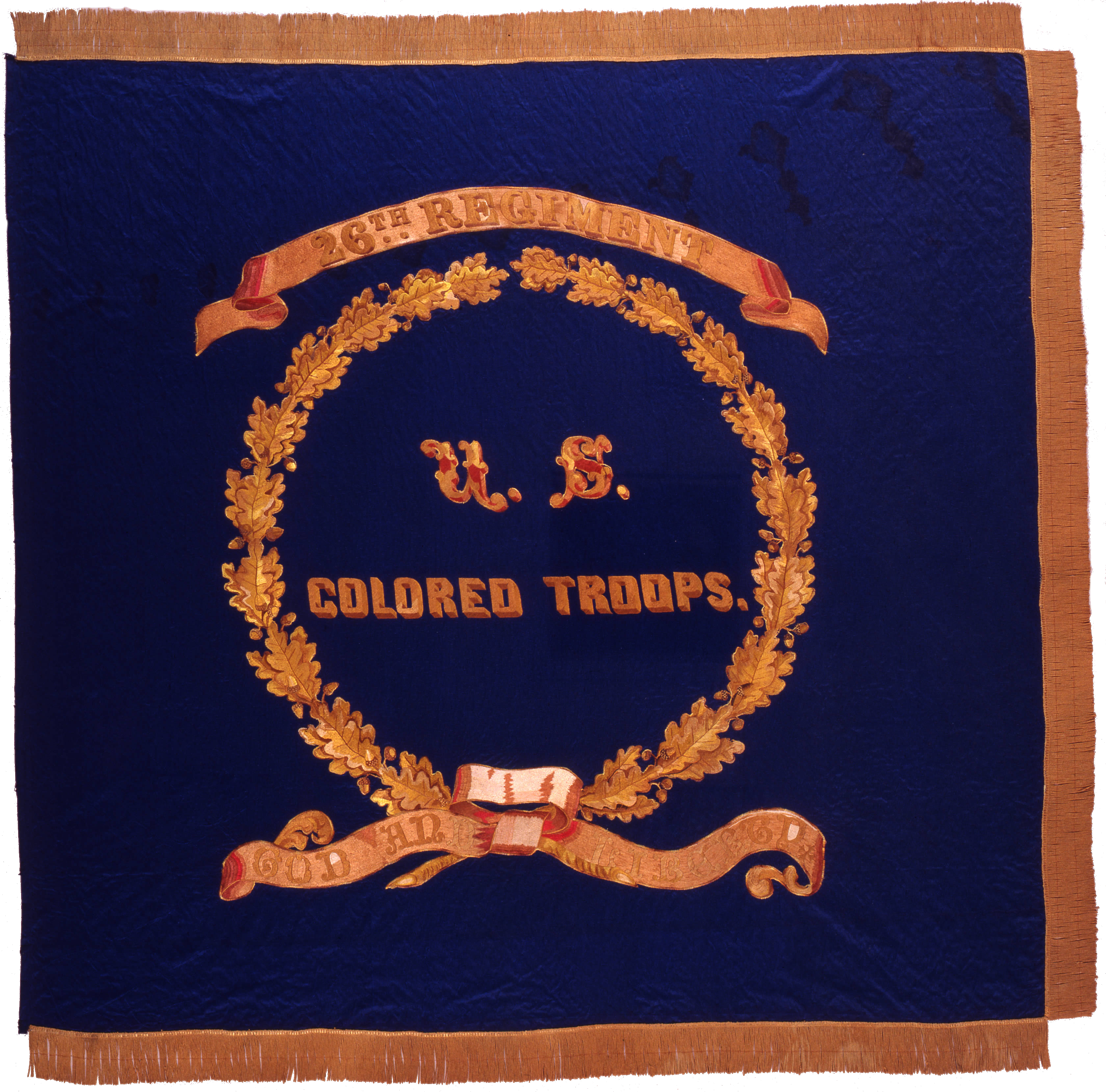
Regimental Flag

The Regiment was briefly deployed to Annapolis, Maryland, then transferred to Beaufort, SC, Department of the South, on April 13, 1864. They sustained 97 casualties in the Battle of John's Island in the first week of July, 1864. The unit also fought at Chapin's Farm, McKay's Point and Deveraux's Neck, incurring a total of 140 casualties.

The unit's service record, according to Dyer's Compendium (1908):

- Reported at Beaufort, S.C., April 13, 1864, and post duty there until November 27.
- Expedition to Johns and James Islands July 2–10.
- Operations against Battery Pringle July 4–9.
- Actions on John's Island, July 5 and 7. Burden’s Causeway July 9.
- Battle of Honey Hill November 30.
- Demonstration on Charleston & Savannah Railroad December 6–9.
- Action at Devaux’s Neck December 6.
- Tulifinny Station December 9.
- McKay’s Point December 22.
- Ordered to Beaufort, S.C., January 2, 1865, and duty there until August.
- Mustered out August 28, 1865.

== Legacy ==
Because the unit drew African-Americans from throughout the state and country, there are monuments and notable veterans from several different places.

=== Veterans ===
Notable veterans include:

- David Carll, the great-great-grandfather of Vanessa Williams, joined the regiment at age 21. He used his enlistment bounty to purchase land on a hill near South Street in Oyster Bay, NY, which bears his name.
- Thornton Chase served as a first lieutenant of 26th at the age of 17 and stayed in South Carolina to serve as a captain in the new 104th United States Colored Infantry. After the war and becoming an actor/entertainer he became known as the first member of the Baháʼí Faith from the West.
- Dr. Noah Elliott, who served as the regiment's hospital steward, returned to Ohio and became the first African-American physician in Athens County, Ohio. His house in Athens is a historic site, with a marker commemorating the marriage of Booker T. Washington to the sister of Elliott's wife.
- Lt. Col. William B. Guernsey, the unit's commanding officer when they were mustered out, ran in 1885 as the Greenback-Labor party's candidate for New York Attorney General. He and his wife subsequently donated their estate to create the Guernsey Memorial Library in Norwich, NY.
- Benjamin F. Randolph, originally from Ohio, remained in South Carolina after the unit was mustered out, served in the Freedmen's Bureau, and was elected to the state Senate. He served as a delegate to the state Constitutional Convention and as chair of the South Carolina Republican Party Central Committee. Randolph was assassinated on October 16, 1868.

=== Monuments, commemorations ===
Monuments and commemorations of the 26th Regiment include:

- David Carll's headstone, in Oyster Bay's Pine Hollow Cemetery, which notes his service in the 26th Regiment.
- The first episode of the second season of Who Do You Think You Are? featured Vannessa Williams' search for her ancestor David Carll, and visited several of the battle sites where the 26th Regiment fought.
- The gravestone for Francis "Frank" Johnson (1833–1899) in Brooklyn's Gravesend Cemetery notes he served in Company I, 26th U.S. Troops.
- St. James AME Zion Church in Ithaca, NY, has a black granite monument which lists the names of 26 soldiers from Ithaca and Elmira who served in the 26th Regiment.
- A film commemorating the USCT 26th Regiment, Civil Warriors, was released in 2011.
- After Benjamin Randolph's assassination, a cemetery was created in Columbia, SC, in 1871 to commemorate his service to the state and membership in the 26th Regiment. It was designated a historic landmark in 2008.
- A memorial in Wooster Cemetery in Danbury, CT, lists 4 soldiers from the 26th Regiment.

== See also ==
- United States Colored Troops
- List of United States Colored Troops Civil War Units
- Thornton Chase was among the white officers of the regiment, and later joined the Baháʼí Faith

== Notes ==
- Although organized in New York state, the regiment contained volunteers from many different states, and is distinct from the 26th New York Volunteer Infantry Regiment.
