= Thornton Chase =

American poet

Coordinates: 33.969840°N 118.342881°W

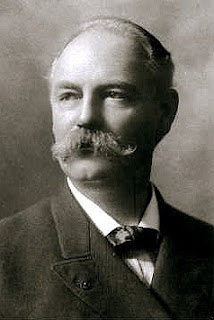
Thornton Chase, c. 1900

Thornton Chase (February 22, 1847 – September 30, 1912) was a distinguished officer of the United States Colored Troops during the American Civil War, and the first western convert to the Baháʼí Faith.

Chase was born in Springfield, Massachusetts to parents of English background and Baptist religion. After being schooled for college by Rev. Samuel Francis Smith he instead enrolled as an officer in the American Civil War serving with two regiments of United States Colored Troops, mostly in South Carolina, where he was wounded. For his service Chase was included on the Wall of Honor of the African-American Civil War Memorial completed in 1997. After the war he worked as a businessman, performed as a singer, and was published as a writer of prose and poetry while living in several states after leaving Massachusetts. He married twice and fathered three children.

Long a seeker in religion, when he was nearly 50 he joined the Baháʼí Faith in 1894–1895—almost as soon as possible in America—and is commonly recognized as the first convert to the religion of the western world. After having organized concerts and businesses in his earlier days, he advanced the organization of communities of the religion especially in Chicago and Los Angeles, serving on early assemblies and publishing committees, the first national attempts at circulating news and guidance for the religion, and an elected national council. He also aided in the founding of other communities, gave talks for the religion in many places including Greenacre in Eliot, Maine, in the northeast and Seattle in the northwest, and authored early books on the religion including an account of his Baháʼí pilgrimage in 1907 and an introductory review of the religion in 1909. During his journeys to the West, ʻAbdu'l-Bahá, then head of the religion, singled Chase out and identified his gravesite as a place of religious visitation. Ultimately Chase was named a Disciple of ʻAbdu'l-Bahá. Collections of his papers began, posthumous articles by him were published, biographical articles about him appeared and his place in the history of the religion in America was contextualized. In 2002 a full biography on Chase was published by Robert H. Stockman and websites have had entries about him since. In 2020, a film on his life was produced by Misaq Kazimi and Sam Baldoni titled Steadfast.

== Early life ==
He was born James Brown Thornton Chase on 22 February 1847 in Springfield, Massachusetts to parents who traced their family back to Britain, and Baptist religion. His father was Jonathan, or Jotham, G and mother Sarah C. G. S. (Thornton) Chase. His father was a singer, amateur scientist, and wealthy businessman, and was a descendant of Aquila Chase who migrated from Chesham in 1630 and of many other colonial families (such as Thomas Dudley). Chase's mother, who was of similar pedigree, died about two weeks after he was born, an event that profoundly shaped Chase's subsequent development. Chase's father remarried three years later and the couple adopted three girls. But instead of being raised at home the United States 1850 census shows that he was living with a foster family in West Springfield at the three years old. Chase himself describes his childhood as "loveless and lonely," and from it he pursued a personal mystical relationship with God.

For four years, aged thirteen to sixteen, Chase lived in Newton, Mass., with the well known Baptist Rev. Samuel Francis Smith. In July 1863 Chase was accepted to Brown University but soon was off to serve in the Civil War.

== Civil War service ==
Just before his seventeenth birthday, in early 1864, Chase traveled to Philadelphia to attend the "Free School for Military Tactics", which was set up to graduate potential officers specifically for black infantry units. He passed the government officer exams in April. (Note: Other students of the school who passed exams in DC the same week as Chase are: Charles E. Behle, George Miller, Sammuel P. Coffan, John Locke, William R. Browne, Frederick W. Watkins, John H. Upham, Mathew H. Kolleck; John Cowgill, DeWitt C. Smith, (E?)dward Pyle, Benton Tuttle, John S. Appleton, John T. Sebering; as published in "Officers for colored troops". Dollar Newspaper. Philadelphia, PA. April 13, 1864. p. 2.(subscription required))

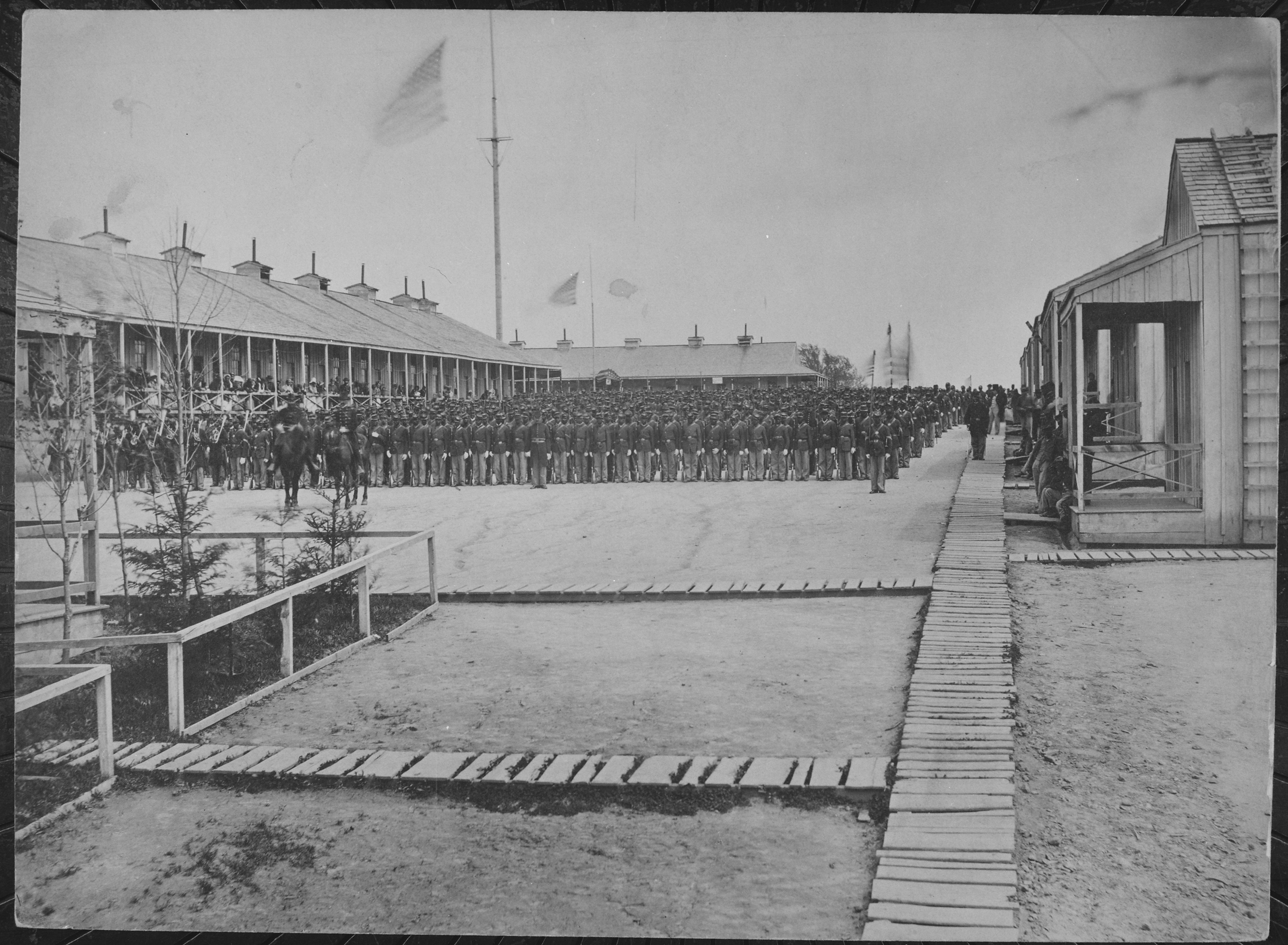
The U. S. C. T. 26th on parade at Camp William Penn, Pa. 1865

The school opened around December, 1863. Attendance at the school was strictly segregated, but it did pass over 400 students through while 21 blacks attended an auxiliary school, and received positive comments from Lincoln's secretary of war, Edwin McMasters Stanton. The school also helped train troops - eleven African American regiments were raised in one year, and were supported by several abolitionists.

By May, 1864 Chase was first lieutenant of Company K, second in charge under the captain, with 100 men. (Note: Some of the others of Company K have been identified: William Diggs, promoted to corporal, noted in Adrienne Shadd (14 December 2010). The Journey from Tollgate to Parkway: African Canadians in Hamilton. Dundurn. p. 160. ISBN 978-1-4597-1170-9.; Robert, Alexander, and Charles Deyo, noted by Bryan_C (Apr 22, 2016). "Company Muster Roll". The CivilWarTalk Network. Archived from the original on 2017-09-13.; John Reed noted at Dr. James P. Weeks; Linda A. Ries (January 2009). Pennsylvania Historical and Museum Commission guide to Civil War holdings (PDF) (2009 ed.). Pennsylvania, US: Pennsylvania Historical & Museum Commission. p. 59. Archived (PDF) from the original on 2017-01-26.; Abraham U. Vangelder was the Second Lieutenant when Chase arrived as First Lieutenant. Stockman, Thornton Chase, 39; Captain Pettit was assigned to Company K at least when in the South. Stockman, Thornton Chase, 44) of the 26th Regiment Infantry U.S. Colored Troops. He claimed to be 19 years old, but was in fact only two months past his 17th birthday. A company would normally be 60 to 80 privates, a wagoner, 2 musicians, 8 corporals, 4 sergeants, 1 first sergeant, 1 second and 1 first lieutenants, and 1 captain. About 1000 men, the regiment was mustered and practiced on Rikers and Hart Islands and would have received its "colors" (its flags) on March 26, 1864, however, a severe storm struck. On July 5 and 7, the unit fought two battles south of Charleston, S.C. in and around John's Island, especially around Fort Pringle; two officers were wounded during battles in South Carolina during this first deployment – Chase was wounded by an exploding cannon, permanently injuring the hearing in his left ear, and the other was the commander of the regiment who was killed December 17, 1864. Chase is listed returning to New York in November as "James B Chase".

Richard Walter Thomas, black scholar of race relations, observed that the relationship between white and black soldiers in the Civil War was an instance of what he calls "the other tradition": "… after sharing the horrors of war with their black comrades in arms, many white officers experienced deep and dramatic transformations in their attitudes toward blacks." Chase's personal views are not known, but in 1865 Chase started service in another black soldier unit. He was promoted to captain and commanded Company D of the 104th United States Colored Infantry. (Note: Some names have been compiled for Company D 104th gathered from pension files who applied generally between 1890 and 1910. For the whole regiment some 504 applications for pensions were filed - survivors who had lived to do so. Noting claims were only for soldiers who could claim disability due to service in the war, this list is further filtered for those who were only enlisted soldiers, whose applications were successful, had descendants, and the applications included affidavits or depositions that gave some sense of biography. They names are: George Curry(1833-1916), Stephen Devoe(c1841-1906), Nero Dingle(c1843-1919), Sam Githers(1846-1907), Edward Gourdine(1841-1915), David Jimmerson(?-1909), Prince McIrchin(1847-1936), Wilson Phillips(1842-1902), and Billy Rambert(1842-1907). Additionally the company's 1st lieutenant was Edward Stoeber. See John Raymond Gourdin (1997). Voices from the Past: 104th Infantry Regiment - USCT, Colored Civil War Soldiers from South Carolina. Heritage Books. pp. xv–xvi, 63–8, 85–6, 89–90, 97–8, 121–4, 151–2, 159–60, 223. ISBN 978-0-7884-0718-5. In addition to those of company K it is noted that Louis Gregory's father, George Gregory, was First Sergeant in Company C of the 104th in 1866.Morrison, Gayle (2009). "Gregory, Louis George (1874-1951)". Baháʼí Encyclopedia Project. Evanston, IL: National Spiritual Assembly of the Baháʼís of the United States.) That unit was organized at Beaufort, S. C., April–June, 1865, and did guard duty at various points in South Carolina through February, 1866. Meanwhile news of the surrender of Lee and days later of the assassination of Lincoln arrived in late April. Chase's resignation from the military was accepted November 7, 1865, in Beaufort, SC, and thus honorably discharged. However, because of the manner of his resignation from service, he was later denied pay for returning home which was restricted to being discharged from service by the military - though he was given "in kind" travel back to New York.

Nearly two decades later, he contributed a poem to a magazine noting the dying off of the Civil War veteran, with the poem "Lo! The Ranks are Thinned and Thinning". Lines of it were used in veteran memorials. Robert Stockman, a scholar on Chase, draws attention to two stanzas of the poem as having a biographical tone to them:

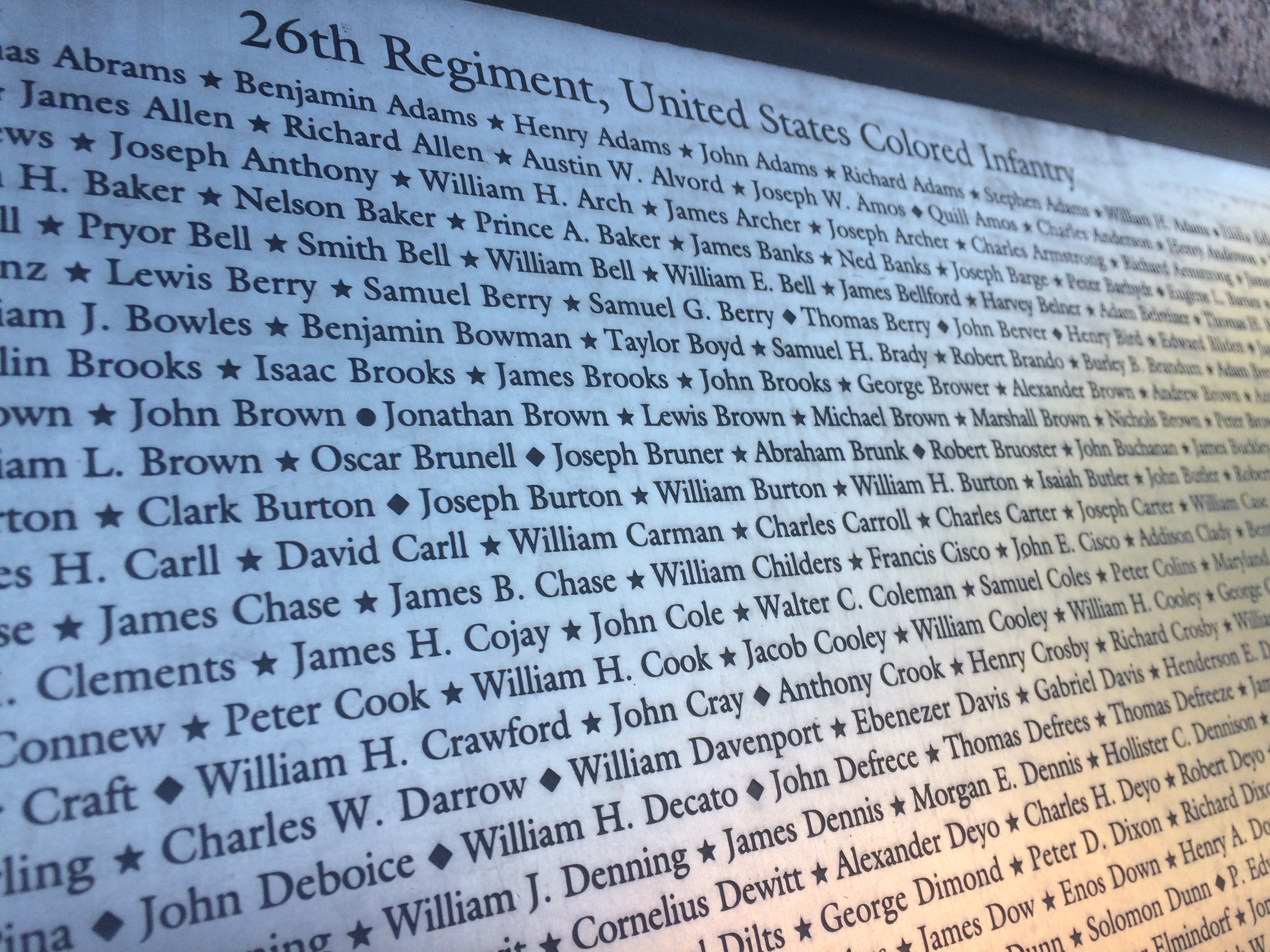
Names from the plaque on the African American Civil War Memorial of the 26th Regiment, USCI, James B. Chase on 13th line near left

Gettysburg and Vicksburg's trenches,

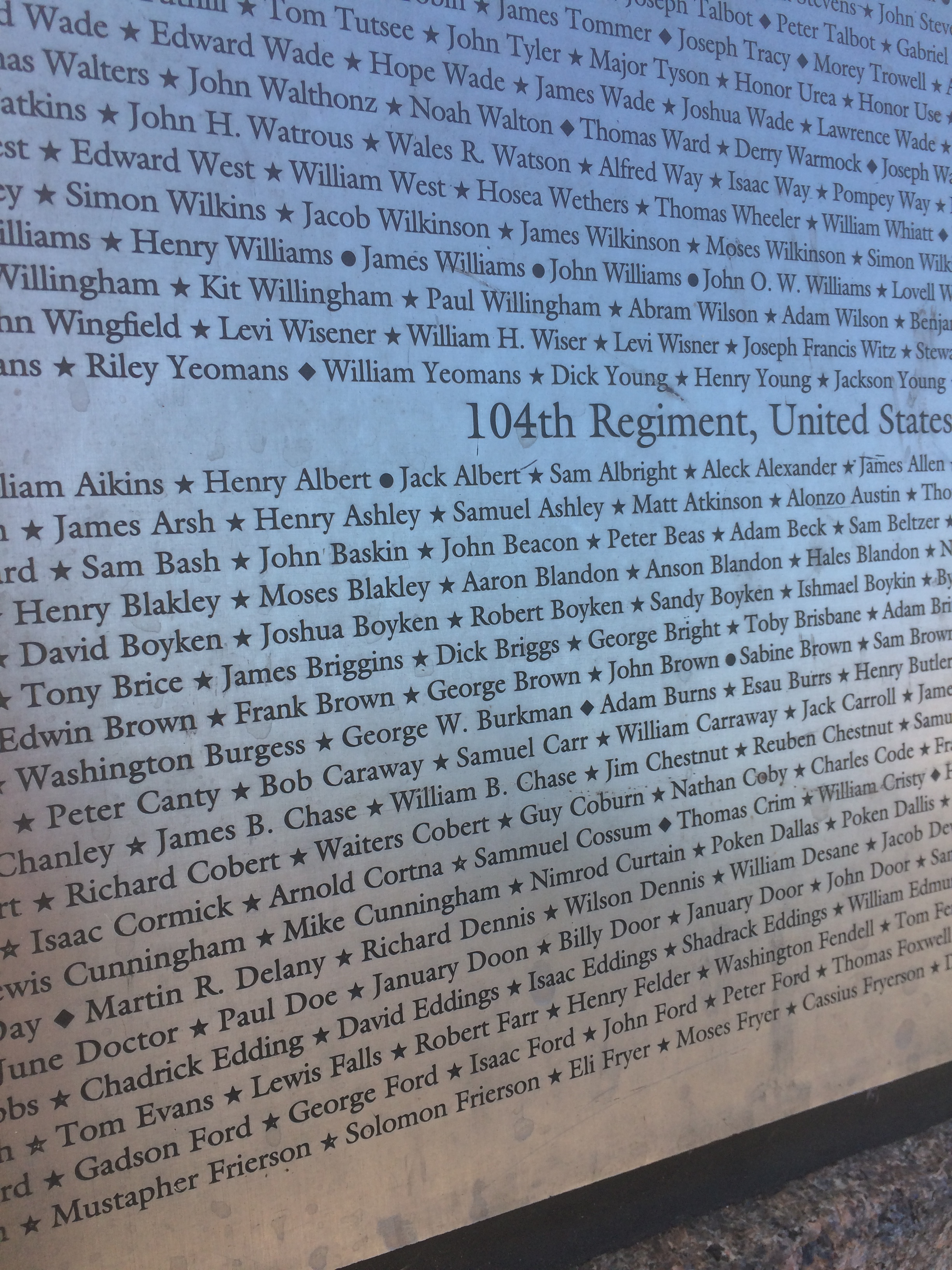
Names from the plaque on the African American Civil War Memorial of the 104th Regiment, USCI, James B. Chase on 10th line near left

At whose memory courage blenches,
And the dreadful Wilderness;
Carolina's swamps, and Georgia,
Like a hydra-headed Borgia,
Send their armies bodiless.

From the beds of rolling rivers,
From the woods where moaning quivers
Thro' the shivered, creaking trees;
From each battlefield and prison,
Myriad martyr-souls have risen,

Risen to an endless peace.

For his service in U. S. Colored Troops and U. S. Colored Infantry regiments, his name was included as "James B. Chase" among the 7000 white officers on the Wall of Honor at the African American Civil War Memorial.

== Marriage and employment ==
Chase began to attend Brown University in September 1866, and was elected class secretary, but left school before completing the second semester. He returned to Springfield, where he worked for his father's lumber business – and joined the Mendelssohn club. On 11 May 1870 he married Annie Elizabeth Allyn of Bristol, Rhode Island, and they had two children: Sarah Thornton (1871–1908) and Jessamine Allyn (1874–1947). Chase's activities in work in society multiplied: he started his own specialty lumber business, directed the choir of First Baptist Church, and served as an officer in one of Springfield's musical organizations, and performed in a local concert.

In 1872 Chase's business failed. Unemployed, he moved to Boston leaving his wife and children, where he obtained a meager and unsatisfying living as an actor and singer. In 1873, amidst the Panic of 1873 and subsequent Long Depression and its privations, Chase described having what he called a mystical experience of God's love, of love "unspeakable," of "absolute oneness," which set him on a path of renewed hope in a religious search. Not finding sufficient work to support him and his family in Boston, Chase moved to Fort Howard (Green Bay, Wisconsin), where he taught school. The first high school graduates of the city ever were in 1875. He moved to Chicago briefly and then he moved to Kansas with teaching and music tutoring jobs and was visible in the local newspapers in 1879 in a regional music convention. However the school broke up. Next Chase settled in Del Norte, Colorado as an early mining town but was not successful. Meanwhile, Annie remained in Springfield living with her mother and their two daughters, waiting for her husband to provide his family support. However in March 1878 she moved back to Rhode Island and filed for divorce. He wrote a certified letter responding, and despite family pressure to reconcile, Annie persevered and the court granted the divorce. Chase had little to do with the family after that. Annie lived the rest of her days in Newport, Rhode Island, dying in 1918. Chase's older daughter, Sarah, married in 1895 and had five children before dying suddenly in 1908. Chase's last daughter, Jessamine, never married and became a school teacher and musician; she died in 1947. A letter from some family in New York looking for him was published looking for him some years later in South Dakota. Meanwhile he met and married Eleanor Francesca Hockett Pervier on 6 May 1880 and they settled in Pueblo, Colorado.

Once again he became active in music. He returned to Kansas for a concert in mid-February, 1881, held despite a blizzard stranding rail travelers. He bought an advertisement for music students in the March. In May Chase assisted in the production of two concerts in Pueblo, and also took various jobs over the summer/winter, while continuing in music performances. He began to publish poetry in local newspapers and magazines; one poem focuses on Jesus's love for humanity, thereby highlighting Chase's devotion to Jesus. He also had some success in mining. He invented and patented a prospector's pick in 1881. In October 1883 newspaper articles mentioned his pursuing gold mining, and in December he hoped to open a mining company named "Amity Company". A mine of his was producing well decades later.

In early 1882 Chase served on a city government committee investigation of setting up lead works in Pueblo as its secretary. In later 1882 Chase moved to Denver and was noted contributing poems to local papers. He was also visible singing at various events the end of that year and into the next, known as a "leading basso".

He was called one of the leading poets of Pueblo in 1884. A brief mention in 1885 says both he and Mrs. Chase went into the mountains for the summer. He joined the local Swedenborgian church in 1883, attached to its emphasis of a metaphorical interpretation of the Bible and stressed a mystical approach to Jesus and Christianity and its sense of Christianity was much less doctrinal that the Baptist Church of Chase's childhood. However he didn't like the church's view on the Virgin birth of Jesus, and the Denver church was wracked by doctrinal disputes five years later. About that time Chase abandoned it and all other Christian churches. He initiated a broader religious search and began to read a wide variety of books about religion; Chase read James Freeman Clarke's classic Ten Great Religions, later said he had taken an interest in Hinduism and for a time accepted the idea of reincarnation.

In the summer of 1886 Chase was mentioned in theatrical productions in Denver. In March 1887 he was hired by the Union Mutual Life Insurance Company as an agent and soon promoted as manager for all of Colorado. In June 1888 they promoted him again and moved him to their California office where he was listed as "superintendent" for the company. The move was noted back in Pueblo, and his career lauded. On 28 June 1889 Chase and Eleanor had a son, William Jotham Thornton Chase. Chase published a booklet called Sketches that explains why people should purchase life insurance for themselves, using biblical and religious stories to illustrate its major points. According to Stockman, it reveals Chase as a religious seeker familiar with all the major religions. His wife was visible in the Santa Cruz community up to 1892. Thornton Chase was visible entertaining at a reception in April, 1893.

== Baháʼí life ==
=== Chicago ===
In June 1893 Union Mutual promoted Chase to superintendent of all agencies west of the Appalachians. This necessitated a move to Chicago. In May he was in Omaha, NE, and Salt Lake, UT, for business, and in early September the president of his company was killed in a train accident back east. He may have been able to attend the first Parliament of the World's Religions held in Chicago in mid-September which was organized by a Swedenborgian. Stockman considers it likely Chase at least followed the reports in the newspapers which did include a quote of Baháʼu'lláh, the founder of the Baháʼí Faith, and Chase could have followed up with the then available books and journal articles by Edward Granville Browne available in the library. The next president of the company was elected in October. In early 1894 Chase was elected to the Insurance Underwriters Association there. Stockman quotes Carl Scheffler offering an anecdote of how Chase learned of a teacher of the religion in Chicago:

While writing a poem about God one day he was interrupted by the visit of a business acquaintance who expressed an interest in his activity, perhaps because he was so busy typing. Mr. Chase read a portion of what he was writing and he was astounded when his friend told him that he had recently come upon a man who had declared that God had “walked upon the earth.” Immediately Mr. Chase expressed interest and asked to be conducted to this person.

Chase was then put in touch with Ibrahim George Kheiralla, recently immigrated to the United States and the second Baháʼí in America after Anton Haddad. A small group began to study the religion with Kheiralla. Stockman indicates that 5 June 1894 was probably the day the class began. A week later he was noted in Pueblo, CO, and then attended a memorial observance for Bunker Hill back in Chicago. Chase's status as a Baháʼí is accepted pointing to this time though several others accepted the new religion before him, but did not stay with the religion. Thus Chase should be considered the first American to become and remain a Baháʼí, and not the first American Baháʼí chronologically. In January 1897, his speech at an insurance agents convention was described as "beautiful…, bright and sublime in its imagery", about attaining to noble ideals above "killing time". In February Chase used an editorial commending of the insurance agent association for "inviting men in various walks of life to its banquets to speak to the members on topics that inspire, elevate, and encourage", and expands on the theme, quoting his words:

If we are only business seekers, traders, worshipers of the calf of gold, Caesar is our tax assessor and God to us is nothing; but if we are teachers and bearers of "good will to men," we shall keep the laws of humanity with heart and act, helping men to help themselves, teaching them the beauty and wisdom of unselfishness, of laboring for others, of providing a certain hope for their own futures, of protecting those dependent on them, even after earthly interests shall cease.

Let us hope that we may urge their minds so close to the border land of the life to come that they may look across the line of division between earthly affairs and eternal ones, and grasp ideals of the greater beauty and grander wisdom of striving for the fulfillment of God's promises to men, and of providing for a permanent home in the kingdom of their Creator.

In early 1899 Chase submitted an essay to the association's competition, and raised awareness of the religion in Cincinnati as well. Baháʼís including Chase were also known to frequent a restaurant named "Kimballs' Restaurant" in Chicago.

Classes on the Baháʼí Faith were organized in Chicago, and later in Enterprise, Kansas; Kenosha, Wisconsin; Ithaca, New York; New York City; Philadelphia; and Oakland, California. By 1899 there were many hundreds of Baháʼís in Chicago itself and close to 1500 among those cites. There had also begun to be some public attention to the point that it drew a public rebuke in the person of Stoyan Krstoff Vatralsky – and to whom Chase stood up in public to retort and there followed newspaper articles going back and forth.

In 1899 other American Baháʼís went on pilgrimage to Akka, Palestine, where they met ʻAbdu'l-Bahá. Chase was invited but could not go. They brought knowledge of the Baháʼí organizational system to the United States but it took time to develop. Chase became one of the leading organizers of the Chicago community, being elected to its first council, then one of its officers in 1899, and then in a reformulated "Board of Council." At the time it was thought the institution should be restricted to men, a position Chase accepted. Meanwhile the very nature of organization and community was threatened as Kheiralla became increasingly alienated from the Baháʼís in 1899 and 1900. Chase made a leading effort to find bridges with Kheiralla but it became impossible and then Chase was a leader of the effort to distinguish Kheiralla from the religion. Among those earliest Baháʼís who retained belief and membership in the unity with ʻAbdu'l-Bahá were Louisa A. Moore (known after marriage as Lua Getsinger), Howard MacNutt, Arthur P. Dodge and Helen S. Goodall. However at the turn of the century the American Baháʼí community still lacked a coherence nationally. This began to be addressed in 1900 and 1901 when ʻAbdu'l-Bahá sent ʻAbdu'l-Karím-i-Tihrání, Hájí Mírzá Hassan-i-Khurásání, Mírzá Asadu'lláh, and Mírzá Abu'l-Faḍl to the United States to more fully educate the Baháʼís on the teachings of the religion. Chase arranged for their housing and himself moved into the Baháʼí center with some of them while his wife was away. A third institution for Chicago was called for in May 1901, initially called the Chicago House of Justice and then the Chicago House of Spirituality. By 1902, and through 1909, Chase was serving as chair, and was noted for being a champion of the Baháʼí principle of consultation. Chase's background in writing served the initial stages of developing Baháʼí literature in America. A publishing company for Baháʼís was started in 1900 with Chase among its members; and in the quickly shifting situations legally incorporated as the "Bahai Publishing Society" in 1902. It became the principal publisher of Baháʼí literature in the English-speaking world, and the standardization of the spelling of Middle Eastern Baháʼí names and terms. Chase was the principal editor of the publisher's literature in this early period and one of its principal financial supporters. In 1904, a letter of a pilgrim to Chase reported ʻAbdu'l-Bahá seeing the American community in a dream as lacking coherence and harmony and the community was characterized by scholar Gayle Morrison as "lacking a wide selection of sacred literature, the study of which forms the basis of individual spiritual responsibility, and without a functioning (national) administration… (and) remained individualistic, even idiosyncratic, in their communal relationships," (such as in race relations amidst a segregated America.) About that time the House of Spirituality began to send out newsletters to Baháʼí communities throughout the United States and Canada, informing them of Baháʼí Holy Days and the fast, which began their observance in North America. Scholar Marzieh Gail indicates her father, Ali Kuli Khan, asked individuals in 1906 if translations of letters to individuals could be copied and sent to Chase in particular so that they were then more widely circulated, (about 4 years before the first national periodical.)

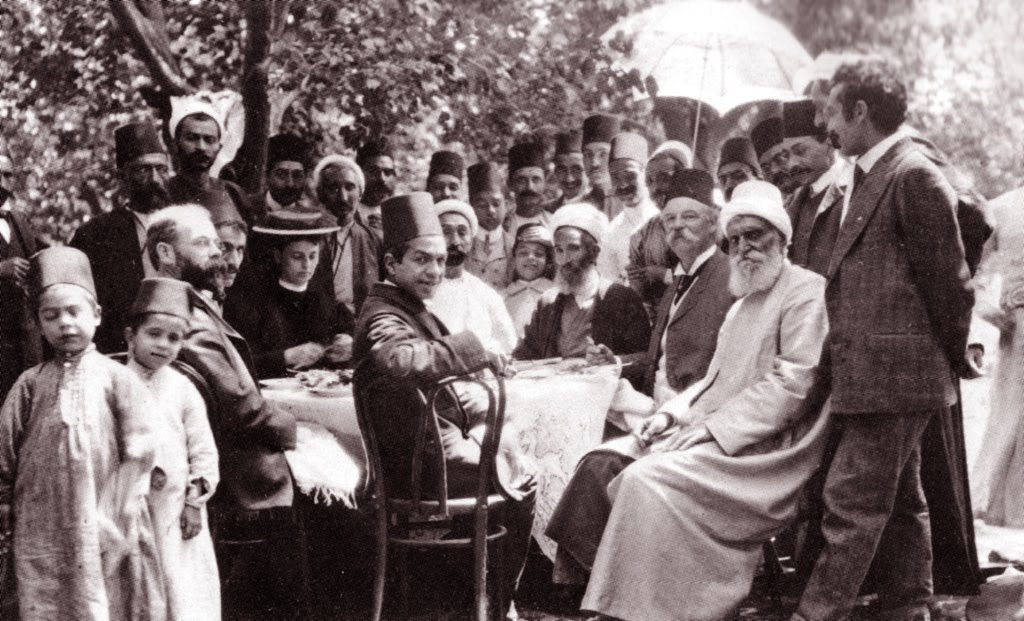
Thornton Chase (seated, second from right) among Baháʼís in Egypt.

Meanwhile Chase set out on further travels for the religion. In 1902 he went to Johnstown, NY, and Manitoba, Canada, as well as Louisville, KY, in 1903. In 1904 and 1906, Chase presented at the Monsalvat School at Greenacre and other conferences there.

In 1907, Chase went on Baháʼí pilgrimage though only for three days but still a pivotal experience for him and he wrote a book about it. ʻAbdu'l-Bahá, highly impressed by Chase's qualities, conferred on him the title thábit, "steadfast." A picture of Chase in Egypt among Baháʼís was published in 1908.

On returning home Chase presented again at Greenacre and Cincinnati, about his 1907 pilgrimage. In 1908 he joined an association to aid to the poor.

During his pilgrimage, he had asked ʻAbdu'l-Bahá about the community building a temple and was directed to work with Corinne True, later appointed as a Hand of the Cause, as "complete directions" had been given to her. This was a step in the process of implementing the Baháʼí teaching of the equality of women and men. A series of articles in the fall of 1908 including Chase among a set of women in several newspapers about the aim of the Baháʼís to build a House of Worship. And a photograph including Chase in 1908 at the home of the Trues was published in 1976 – he's the tallest man in the picture. This interaction led to the next development of a national sense of community: The election of the first national council of the religion, with delegates present from across the US and Canada, in the spring of 1909. Thirty percent of the members elected were women; there was still some confusion over the issue of female membership until 1912.

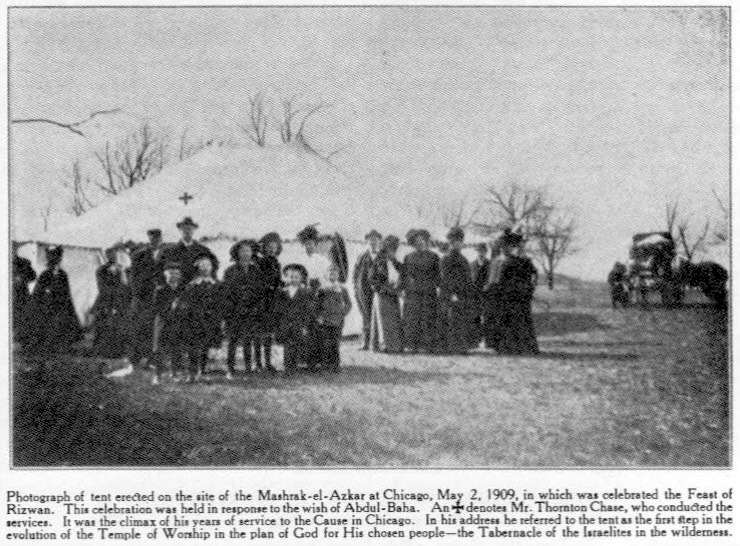
Tent raised at the site of the future Baháʼí Temple near Chicago for the Feast of Ridván, noting especially Thornton Chase with the ✚ above him.

In February 1909 Chase addressed the University of Chicago International Club students on the imminence of the age outlining a number of expected changes coming: The downfall of nationalism/rise of internationalism, universal peace instead of battleships, and war becoming seen as a "deed of inhumanity", and in March appeared listed as a Baháʼí publicly in Chicago.

Chase then wrote an introductory book on the religion, The Bahai Revelation, in 1909. According to Stockman "this work was one of the most comprehensive and accurate introductions to the Baháʼí Faith written by an early American Baháʼí." The work emphasized the Baháʼí Faith and its teachings as a vehicle for personal spiritual transformation.

=== Los Angeles ===
The Union Mutual Life Insurance Company didn't like the publicity linking their company with Chase's publicity for the religion, and transferred him to Los Angeles. Stockman says "Chase considered resigning from the company, but at the age of sixty-two he found it impossible to obtain another job, and he had to support his wife, his son in college, and his elderly mother-in-law, none of whom had become Baháʼí." Chase still traveled for the religion. Indeed he reached Victoria, British Columbia in 1909. In 1910 a talk entitled as his introductory book was offered in Los Angeles. In 1911 Chase spoke to a public meeting of the religion in Portland, Oregon. He helped to organize the Los Angeles Baháʼís; in 1910 they elected a five-member governing board that included Chase as a member, which then included a majority of women, with a general community of some 30 people. They also established their first monthly meetings. Though he could not attend the national convention of Baháʼís in 1910 he did send a letter. In 1911 he was listed as the contact address for the assembly, participated in attempts by the community to coordinate internationally, and was credited with assisting to organize the Denver Baháʼí Assembly along with Corinne True. That summer Chase received a copy of the proceedings of the First Universal Races Congress to which ʻAbdu'l-Bahá had sent a representative with a message. Chase observed a distinction between ʻAbdu'l-Bahá's message of promoting spiritual unity as a higher calling than that of simply recognizing partisanship among nations vying for priority or advocacy of a race and stressed that the transformation of the time required accepting the influences of the "new heaven". In November he summarized the presence of the religion in California for the first major Baháʼí periodical of the country, Star of the West, noting excitement in San Francisco because of the visit of Dr. Fareed and Lua Getsinger in advance of ʻAbdu'l-Bahá coming west, regular meetings in Los Angeles as well, and the hospitality provided by Mrs. Goodall and Cooper in Oakland. In May 1912 Chase was present at garden party observance of Ridván in San Francisco. The San Francisco Assembly had been founded in 1910. Stockman observed circa 1990 that Chase used to include mention of how many Baháʼí there were in the early days of the religion in his letters to people in a period well before the first accounting done inside the religion.

== Death ==
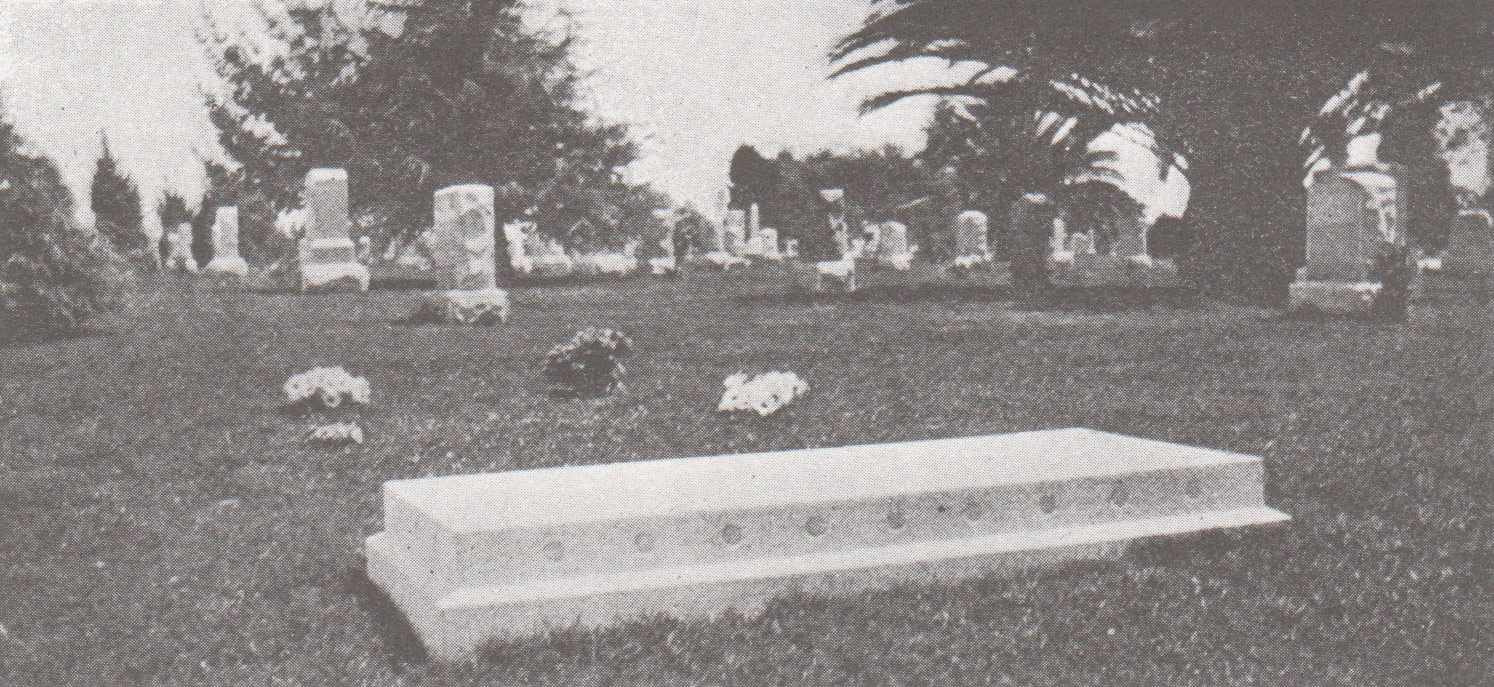
Chase's grave in Inglewood Park Cemetery, Los Angeles as it appeared in 1920.

Thornton Chase died on 30 September 1912 in Los Angeles, age 65, of complications following unsuccessful surgery. Chase managed a note to his friend John Bosch while in the hospital. The surgery was not successful and Chase was in pain some 5 days before dying, probably of cancer. ʻAbdu'l Bahá was on a train en route to California at the time; He immediately changed his plans and went to Los Angeles to visit Chase's grave. There he praised Chase's qualities highly, instructed the Baháʼís to hold a commemoration of Chase annually at his grave, and encouraged Baháʼís to visit the gravesite. Many Baháʼís visited that year and a more permanent memorial has since been raised. ʻAbdu'l-Bahá wrote a prayer for Chase that includes:

Verily he guided the people to Thine ancient pathway, and led them to Thy way of rectitude.
Verily he held the chalice of guidance in his right hand and gave unto those athirst to drink of the cup of favor."

A letter from the Los Angeles community published in Star of the West in October noted his many meetings along the last trip he took along the coast perhaps as far as Vancouver and that signs of his illness had appeared during the trip. The outline of his life offered by Frank G. Tyrrell included mention of being a student of Rev. Samuel F. Smith, joining the military at 17, his Civil War service and rising to Captain, but not the detail of it being with black regiments, did include briefly of his life in Colorado and then as an insurance agent. They had held a prayer vigil for him while he was in the hospital which transitioned directly into a memorial on hearing of his death. The funeral was held a few days later with contributions from some ministers as well as friends and a memorial a couple days after that. A friend outlined his life including his Civil War service and that he had not spoken of this as well, as well as his career. Mrs. Chase spoke at the memorial as well.

An obituary article was published in the Brown University Alumni periodical in Feb 1913 by Brown alumnus Alfred G. Langley, it emphasizes his relationship with the Bahá´í Faith though it all but skips his military career in how quote of Chase's presents his life. Another mention came a month later by alumnus Wilfred H. Munro commenting on the incompleteness of a text of Brown university students who had served in the Civil war by adding that Chase was Captain of Company D of the 104th US Colored Infantry.

== Legacy ==
=== Early period ===
The October issue of Star of the West made room for remembering him while news continued of ʻAbdu'l-Bahá's travels and speeches and dedication of the cite for the Baháʼí House of Worship near Chicago. It included a long poem Chase composed. This poem arrived in Egypt and was read to ʻAbdu'l-Bahá July 4, 1913. The Star of the West edition also published letters from various communities memorializing him. Tributes from Portland, OR and Chicago were also published, followed in March, 1913, by one from Beirut which included remembrance of those who were on pilgrimage and met him in 1907. A letter/poem/ode from him to ʻAbdu'l-Bahá was published in September, 1913 dated from August, 1912, published as a one year anniversary of the visit of ʻAbdu'l-Baha to his gravesite and was re-printed in 1922. The editors noted the observance held for what was called "The day of Thornton Chase". It also reported more of the words ʻAbdu'l-Bahá had said on the visit to the gravesite:"…During his lifetime he bore many trials and vicissitudes, but he was very patient and long-suffering. He had a heart most illuminated, a spirit most rejoiced; his hope was to serve the world of humanity; during the days of his life he strove as much as he could – he never failed…" There was an article then published including a picture marking Chase among the people standing at a Ridván meeting in May, 1909, who lead the services that day and compared the tent raised as a precursor to the eventual building. It also included a short article by Chase "The Greatest Name". An account of that first anniversary followed in the November edition. 10 Baháʼís attended the gravesite Sep 30th with flowers and prayers for an hour and a service was held the following Sunday in a hall which was also the anniversary of ʻAbdu'l-Bahá's visit and the assemblage again returned to the gravesite at sunset. A memorial comment was then published from Thomas Kelly Cheyne. In February 1914, an excerpt from Chase's book The Bahai Revelation was published in Star of the West. The anniversary was noted again in 1914, and then an article briefly reviewing the history of the religion in America by Chase was published in early 1915, and again noted the anniversary in September. A more enduring gravestone was placed in 1918. A memoriam article in 1918 noted 21 Baháʼís attended the anniversary meeting which also saw the new stone marker. Mrs. Chase attended and shared anecdotes of his life. A picture of the gravestone was published in 1920.

In 1920 Martha Root refers to distributing Chase's book The Bahai Revelation in various libraries on her tour around South America. Memorials of others began to be published in 1922 recalling the contact they had had with Chase.

=== Later period ===
The memorial meeting in 1924 noted that inquirers were informed of "the truth of the Oneness of Mankind and the fatherhood of God, for which Mr. Chase had given his heart and life." The writer of the article, Willard Hatch, was requested to gather materials on the life of Chase in 1927. He updated attendees at the national convention of Baháʼís over the next few years, and was joined in the work by John Bosch. Bosch was in fact an inheritor of Chases' literary material and a collection of some Baháʼí materials Chase had not already sent to Chicago for archival purposes. A survey of the materials gathered was published in April 1930. (Note: The summary is a bit unclear in some details. See Willard Hatch; John Bosch (Apr 1930). "Committee to compile letters and writings of Thornton Chase". Baháʼí News. pp. 17–8. Archived from the original on 2017-09-14.: 25 original letters from ʻAbdu'l-Bahá to Chase, some hair of Baháʼu'lláh and ʻAbdu'l-Bahá.; What is called a "unique chart" and or designs that he carried on his person.; What is called the "1st petition" of Chase to the Holy Land (for joining the Baha'i Faith?).; A list of 72 names of individuals who had passed through the class in 1895-7.; A short history written by Chase (perhaps the one published in 1915) and that a comment that none became Baha'is from the 1893 Fair.; 19 original letters from Chase to others; A 37 page work tracing religious history; Records of what ʻAbdu'l-Bahá said of Chase at various meetings after his death.; A drawing of Chase from an unknown artist.) Then a previously unpublished letter of Chases' was published in Star of the West 1930. Howard MacNutt, another very early Baháʼí, was photographed visiting the gravesite before his death in 1926. In 1930 a dinner was held for the poor commemorating his death followed by a talk on his life. A 5 page letter of Chase's was published in The Baháʼí World series for 1928–30, part of a major series of volumes covering world wide aspects of the religion, entitled Before Abraham was, I am; written in 1902 to a Christian. Further scholarly work on Chase appeared in a 1932 article which included several excerpts from letters and papers of Chase, and gathered materials were being sent to the national archives (and Hatch was perhaps on pilgrimage.) A letter to Chase from ʻAbdu'l-Bahá was central to a question of Baháʼí involvement in the political rights and responsibilities of being a citizen and a Baháʼí communicated specifically in 1933 and was further discussed at the convention and lead to a fuller clarification in 1934. Hatch held a meeting with African-Americans in August 1933 and there was the memorial meeting in September. In 1935 there were several actions remembering Chase:

- a personally owned copy of a book of Chase's was sold to raise money for the Baháʼí Fund,
- a Los Angeles area newsletter reproduced the notice of the first assembly-like institution in LA that elected Chase among the five members,
- more materials of Chases' were mentioned in the 1935 convention,
- and it was also established in 1935 that Chase was to be recognized as one of the Disciples of ʻAbdu'l-Bahá.

In 1937 at the memorial service it was clarified by official translation that the commemoration of visiting the gravesite was on the anniversary of the death of Chase. In 1938 some further materials Chase had had were given to the national archives of the Baháʼís including a seal and ring made with a gem given to him. The certificate from the State of California of the incorporation of the Los Angeles Spiritual Assembly updated in 1938 notes ʻAbdu'l-Bahá's visit to Chase's gravesite in 1912 and the annual memorial for Chase as part of its mandate. By 2005 it was noted the Bosches had donated 11 boxes of materials for the Chase collection of the US Baháʼí national archives. The 1944 Centenary of the religion was observed partially with a text The Baháʼí Centenary which included Chase's early history of the religion incorporated into a broader summary – uncredited, but noted in the second generation national Baháʼí newspaper, the Baháʼí News, that it was by Chase.

In 1945 Chase was mentioned in the Pittsburgh Courier, a noted African-American newspaper, but only his status as the first American Baháʼí and his gravesite visited by ʻAbdu'l-Bahá. Hatch was visible in May again at an interracial meeting and a brief comment was also made of the memorial meeting in the Baháʼí News, followed by a picture of the memorial published soon after. A further scholarly work on Chase was published in August 1945 in the World Order magazine of the religion. In it Scheffler mentioned he had known and traveled with Chase including his pilgrimage but "I had then practically no knowledge of his early life." Scheffler comments on small experiences of Chase mentioning his early life but nothing about the civil war service was mentioned – though he did understand Chase was a singer some time in his early life. Scheffler mentions Chase's deep abiding interest in religion and his finding Swedenborgianism. Scheffler speaks also of some correction of ʻAbdu'l-Bahá of Chase's thought at the time. The memorial was the lead mention in the summary of activities in Los Angeles in 1948 published in the Baháʼí News. In October 1949 Hatch received a clarification to a question he had addressed Shoghi Effendi, then head of the religion; it was clarified that the gravesite could be called a shrine but that it was not important what to call it or if the memorial meeting is held Sep 30 or Oct 1 (since Chase had died after sunset and Baha'i calendars mark the change of day on the sunset.) Memorial observances continued to be published in the Baháʼí News over the years and the responsibility of maintaining the event shifted from Los Angeles to the Inglewood community and with broadening attendance (for example in 1963 it was reported there were some 70 adults and 15 children from a range of communities and in 1965 there were 350 attending.) In 1966 a tree was donated to a nearby park and has been the site of a social reception after the memorial.

In 1972 a review of pilgrimages noted Chase's across a few paragraph's in some detail taking from his In Galilee and Scheffler's comments. In 1973 O. Z. Whitehead wrote a biographical article on Chase published in Baháʼí News. The work identified him specifically as a Captain serving in the Civil War as well as his life as an insurance salesman and his singing voice, refers to Scheffler's essay, and in general to the process by which Chase came to the Baháʼí Faith, and adding an anecdote of Chase meeting John Bosch. In 1974 it was mentioned that John Bosch was Chase's "literary executor" and in general Chase's papers and collected material was willed to Bosch – including calligraphy by a Baháʼí specialist, Mishkin-Qalam, and noted that Mrs. Chase had burned some material before Bosch could arrive. In November 1974 Hand of the Cause Dhikru'llah Khadem called Chase "the Mullá Husayn of the West", (the first believer of the religion founded by the Báb and accepted as a precursor to the religion by Baháʼís.) In 1974 the Pittsburgh Courier again notes Chase, this time in a profile of a major Baháʼí conference, noting he him as the first Baháʼí in America. In 1979 Roger White, called a poet laureette of the religion, albeit unofficially, published a volume of work called Another Song, Another Season: Poems and Portrayals which included a 7 page creative nonfiction story "Graveyards Are Not My Style; Thornton Chase 1847-1912" centering on that first graveside memorial visit with ʻAbdu'l-Bahá. It was written from the point of view of a Catholic man in love with a Baháʼí and their struggle over unity being of different religions and their resolution at the interaction of ʻAbdu'l-Bahá, Thornton Chase's gravesite, and them.

Chase scholar Robert Stockman's 1985 book Baha'i Faith in America: Origins 1892–1900 acknowledged Chase had served in the Civil War (and as a teenager) though not that his service was with black Americans. Neither did volume two in the series. An excerpt from a forthcoming book by Stockman was published in 1987 in the Baháʼí News. It noted Chase was 6' 2" and some 260lbs late in life, had suffered medical trouble some 20 years including a surgery in 1911 and held correspondence between Chase and Bosch. It also included a tribute by Stockman for Chase. It noted Chase was "exceptionally even-tempered and mild-mannered…scrupulously avoided arguing…. His capacity to love anyone, especially those who disagreed with him, is especially demonstrated in his words and actions.… He is perhaps the only person before 1912 who had a thorough understanding of the Baháʼí concept of consultation.… was the prime mover behind many of the (local council)'s activities." Yet none of these refer to his Civil War service being with African Americans. In 1989 Bob Quigley, a Baháʼí television producer who had worked closely with Hand of the Cause William Sears from the 1960s was buried in a grave very near to Chase'. So is that of Kazem Kazemzadeh, the first trustee of the Huququ'llah in the West, the father of Firuz Kazemzadeh.

In 1994 several centennial observances were noted. In January it was announced, in the third generation of Baháʼí national news, The American Baháʼí, that a massive granite monument was placed at the gravesite after a 7 year fundraising campaign. As of June it had cost $26,000. Contributions were sent from Baháʼís all over the United States and from Amatu'l-Baha Ruhiyyih Khanum. The black granite was specially ordered from India and is engraved with gold lettering. The architect who conceived and designed the monument was Arsalan Mottahedin then of Beverly Hills, California. The dedication and unveiling of the monument coincided with the annual memorial service for Thornton Chase. The sculptor for the eagle was Frederick ("Rik") Sargent, a Baháʼí then from Littleton, Colorado. Firuz Kazemzadeh was the keynote speaker at the dedication. A choir directed by Russ Garcia performed. At a June reception on the centennial of the religion in the West the Baháʼís presented a "family album" video narrated by Sylvia B.P. Parmelee which publicly mentioned Chase had served in the Civil War as an officer of black soldiers. The event was attended by over 500 people including dignitaries. A September centenary memorial at the gravesite of Chase's joining the religion was also advertised.

In 2002 Stockman published Thornton Chase: First American Baháʼí and it mentions Chase's war service in detail and with African-American troops. In 2009 an encyclopedic article published by Baháʼís written by Stockman includes his service and addressed Stockman's views of Chase's importance as an early North American Baháʼí thinker, publicist, administrator, and organizer being still underappreciated and that in many ways Chase's death left a gap in the North American Baháʼí community that remained unfilled until the rise to prominence in the early 1920s of Horace Holley, the chief developer of Baháʼí organization in the United States and Canada and included the picture of the 26th Colored Troops on parade as above.

A couple 2012 presentations recalled Chase's correspondence and activity in the religion, one of which included very early picture of Chase from 1884 as well as a picture with his son in Los Angeles. This presentation was republished separately in 2013.

== Bibliography ==
=== Books ===
- Thornton Chase; Arthur S. Agnes (1985) [1908]. Galilee and In Wonderland. Kalimat Press.
- Thornton Chase (1933) [1909]. The Bahai Revelation (2nd ed.). Baha'i Publishing Committee.

=== Shorter pieces ===
- Poem "Lo, the ranks are thinned and thinning" 1882/1883
- The Serpent (Chicago: n.p., 1900)
- What Went Ye Out for to See? ([Chicago: Bahai Publishing Society], 1904).
- Thornton Chase (Aug 1945). "The gift of God" (PDF). World Order. Vol. 11, no. 5. pp. 147–151. Archived (PDF) from the original on 2017-09-16. It was a chapter from Chase's The Bahai Revelation
- excerpts from his letters published as Thornton Chase (1993). "Impressions of ʻAbdu'l-Bahá and His Station". World Order. Vol. 25, no. 1. pp. 12–23.

==== Posthumous publications ====
- Thornton Chase (Jan 19, 1915). Albert R. Windust; Gertrude Buikema; Zia M. Bagdadi (eds.). "A brief history of the American development of the Bahai movement". Star of the West. pp. 263, 5. Archived from the original on 2017-09-14. (republished in 1944.)
- Thornton Chase (1930). "Before Abraham was, I am". The Baháʼí World. Vol. 3. Baháʼí Publishing Trust. pp. 324–9.; written in 1902 to a Christian.

== See also ==
- Benjamin F. Randolph also in the 26th USCT, and Martin Delany and Henry Wilson also in the 104th USCI
- Other white officers in other USCT regiments: Walter Thorn, Edward Winslow Hinks, William Gould (W.G.) Raymond. Charles Henry Howard was leader of the Beaufort, SC training camp for new regiments organized there.
- Baháʼí Faith in North America
- Baháʼí Faith in South Carolina
