= Emma Waldo Smith Marshall =

American missionary

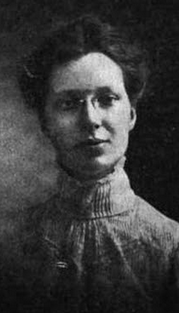
- Emma Waldo Smith, from a 1901 publication
- Born: Emma Waldo Smith; May 11, 1879; Rangoon, Burma
- Died: January 24, 1943 (aged 63); Boston, Massachusetts, US
- Occupation: Missionary
- Spouse: Harry Ignatius Marshall

Emma Waldo Smith Marshall (May 11, 1879 – January 24, 1943) was an American Baptist missionary educator and linguist, born in Burma. She taught at the Karen Baptist Theological Seminary in Rangoon.

== Early life and education ==
Emma Waldo Smith was born in Rangoon, Burma, the daughter of American missionaries Daniel Appleton White Smith and Sarah Lincoln Stevens Smith, Her father was the president of the Karen Baptist Theological Seminary. Her grandfather, Samuel Francis Smith, was an editor and writer, best known as author of the lyrics to "America (My Country 'Tis of Thee)", She lived in Newton Centre, Massachusetts as a child, and graduated from Vassar College in 1900, and spent a year in training at the Newton Theological Institution, before returning to join her parents' work in Burma.

== Career ==
Smith taught Greek New Testament classes at the Karen Baptist Theological Seminary in 1902 and 1903. She studied the Karen language, and helped translate texts into Karen, including classroom materials, a translation of the Bible and a Christian hymnal. She and her husband took charge of the Karen Baptist Theological Seminary in 1920. In 1936, they were assigned to a mission post at Toungoo. They left Burma in 1942 when Japan occupied Burma.

== Personal life ==
In 1903, Smith married fellow American missionary Harry Ignatius Marshall, author of The Karen people of Burma: a study in anthropology and ethnology (1922) and Naw Su: A Story of Burma (1947). They had five children, four of whom were born in Burma. She died in 1943, aged 63, in Boston. Her widower dedicated his next book, Flashes Along the Burma Road (1946), to her memory. The Harry and Emma Marshall Papers are in the collection of the American Baptist Historical Society in Atlanta. There are other relevant papers in the American Baptist Foreign Mission Society records, 1813-1961, at Cornell University.
