= United States Christian Commission =

American religious group supporting the Union Army during the American Civil War

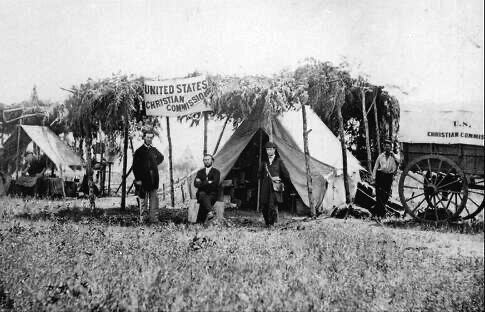
United States Christian Commission battlefield representatives at their headquarters location in Germantown, Maryland.

The United States Christian Commission (USCC) was an organization that furnished supplies, medical services, and religious literature to Union troops during the American Civil War. It combined religious support with social services and recreational activities. It supplied Protestant chaplains and social workers and collaborated with the U.S. Sanitary Commission in providing medical services.

The Christian Commission was created in response to what the troops suffered in the First Battle of Bull Run. On November 14, 1861, the National Committee of the YMCA called a convention which met in New York City. Leaders outlined the work needed to support the soldiers, the design for the United States Christian Commission, whose organization was completed next day. Two of the founding members were Vincent Colyer, who was appalled by the aftermath of the battle of Bull Run, and George Stuart, a well-to-do businessman.

The YMCA and Protestant ministers formed the USCC. Its five thousand volunteers ("delegates") included seminary students, but many were just concerned Christians. As civilians on the battlefield, they did not carry weapons. They distributed more than $6 million worth of goods and supplies in hospitals, camps, prisons and battlefields. The original plan of the USCC was to help the clergy of the armed services in their daily work, as the chaplaincy program was in its infancy, with only some 30 members, who were quickly overwhelmed by the scale of battles and casualties, and especially by the rapidly increasing number of deaths due to wounds and more so to disease.

John Calhoun Chamberlain, brother of Joshua Lawrence Chamberlain and Thomas Chamberlain, heroes of Little Round Top, served with the USCC during the Battle of Gettysburg. During the evening of July 2, John assisted at the medical field station set up for his brothers' regiment, the 20th Maine. John filed a report to the central office, describing the activities of the USCC at Gettysburg. This report is found in Chamberlain's Christian Commission diary, kept during the battle of Gettysburg and is recorded in Edinborough Press' book, Gettysburg and the Christian Commission.

Though USCC organizers were hesitant to allow women to go into hospital service under the auspices of the Commission, women found ways to participate. A national movement started in May 1864 with a view to organizing a Ladies Christian Commission in each evangelical congregation of the North as an auxiliary to the USCC. Increasing the network of collection, fundraising and support was the way the organization responded to meet a growing demand to serve the soldiers. Annie Wittenmyer led dozens of female "lady managers" including Mary and Amanda Shelton, to begin diet kitchens in hospitals in the field to help reduce deaths related to poor quality diet in hospitals.

The USCC continued to grow. More than three-quarters of the value of what it collected was distributed during 1864 and the four months of 1865. It represented both citizens' recognition of need and a more efficient organization. The Ladies Christian Commission (LCC) played a critical role in this success. Louisa May Alcott was among many women who worked with the Commission. Others included Georgia McClellan, the sister of Jenny Wade, the only civilian killed during the Battle of Gettysburg, and Sarah Emma Edmonds, who worked as a nurse after serving with the Union Army as a soldier, spy, and as a male nurse under the name "Franklin Thompson." According to an 1868 account, 45 men and 3 women members of the U.S.C.C. died during the Civil War.

The USCC participated in a religious revival within the Union Army between 1863 and 1865. Converts numbered between 100,000 and 200,000 men.

The National Civil War Chaplains Museum at Liberty University has a section which commemorates the work of the Commission.

== See also ==
- United States military chaplains
