= 144th New York Infantry Regiment =

Union Army unit during the American Civil War

- Active: September 27, 1862–June 25, 1864
- Disbanded: December 9, 1863
- Country: United States
- Allegiance: Union
- Branch: Infantry
- Size: Regiment
- Engagements: American Civil War: Suffolk; Dix's Peninsula Campaign; Folly Island; Morris Island; Fort Wagner; Fort Sumter; Jacksonville; Battery Pringle; Battle of Honey Hill; Battle of Tulifinny

Commanders
- Colonel: Robert S Hughston
- Colonel: David E. Gregory
- Colonel: William J. Slidell
- Colonel: James Lewis

Insignia
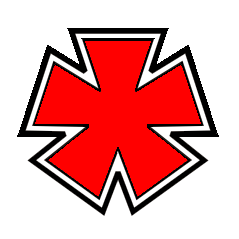
- 1st Division, XXII Corps

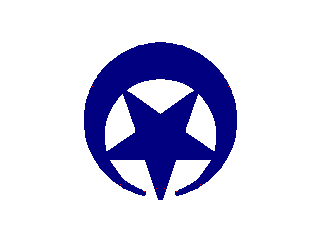
- 3rd Division, VII Corps

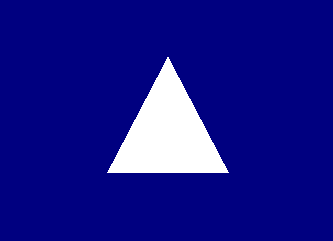
- 2nd Division, IV Corps

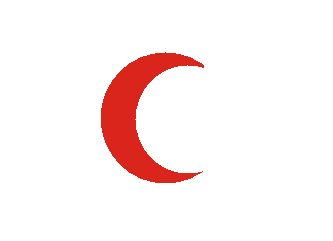
- 1st Division, XI Corps

The 144th New York Infantry Regiment was an infantry regiment in the Union Army during the American Civil War.

== Service ==
The regiment was organized at Delhi, N.Y., and mustered in on September 27, 1862. Left State for Washington, D.C., October 11, 1862. Attached to 3rd Brigade, Abercrombie's Division, Defenses of Washington, to February, 1863. 3rd Brigade, Abercrombie's Division, 22nd Army Corps, Dept. of Washington, to April, 1863. 2nd Brigade, 3rd Division, 7th Army Corps, Dept. of Virginia, to May, 1863. 1st Brigade, 2nd Division, 4th Army Corps, to July, 1863. 2nd Brigade, 1st Division, 11th Army Corps, Army of the Potomac, to August, 1863. 2nd Brigade, Gordon's Division, Folly Island, S.C., 10th Army Corps, Dept. of the South, to February, 1864. 1st Brigade, Ames' Division, District of Florida, to April, 1864. District of Florida, Dept. of the South, to June, 1864. District of Hilton Head, S.C., Dept. of the South, to October, 1864. 3rd Separate Brigade, Dept. of the South, to November, 1864. 1st Brigade, Coast Division, Dept. of the South, to January, 1865. 3rd Separate Brigade, District of Hilton Head, S.C., Dept. of the South, to May, 1865. Port Royal, Dept. of the South, to June, 1865.

== Detailed service ==
The regiment first saw duty in the Defenses of Washington, D. C., until April, 1863. it was ordered to Suffolk, Va. on April 18. The regiment was besieged at Suffolk April 20-May 4 by Longstreet. Providence Church Road May 3. Siege of Suffolk raised May 4. Dix's Peninsula Campaign June 24-July 7. Ordered to Washington, D.C., July 10. Pursuit of Lee to Berlin, Md., July 13–22. Moved to Folly Island, S.C., near Charleston, S.C., harbor August 1–10. During the fall and winter of 1863 the regiment was engaged at Folly and Morris islands, participating with Gillmore's forces in the siege of Fort Wagner and the bombardment of Fort Sumter and Charleston. Siege of Forts Wagner and Gregg, Morris Island, S.C., and operations against Fort Sumter and Charleston August 11-September 7. Bombardment of Fort Sumter and Charleston August 17–23. Capture of Forts Wagner and Gregg September 7. Operations against Charleston and duty on Folly Island, S.C., until December 31. Bombardment of Fort Sumter October 27-November 9. Moved to Hilton Head, S.C., January, 1864. Ordered to Jacksonville, Fla., February, and duty there until June. Expedition from Jacksonville to Camp Milton May 31-June 3. Moved to Hilton Head, S. C., June. Expedition to Johns and James Islands against Charleston July 2–10. Operations against Battery Pringle, Johns Island, July 9. Duty in District of Hilton Head, S.C., until November. Hatch's Expedition up Broad River November 28–30. Battle of Honey Hill, S.C., November 30. Demonstration on Charleston & Savannah Railroad December 6–9. Deveaux's Neck December 6. Tullifinney River December 9. Moved to Hilton Head, S.C., and duty in that district until June, 1865. Mustered out June 25, 1864. Veterans and Recruits transferred to 1st New York Engineers.

== Folly Island ==
The greatest numbers of casualties incurred by the regiment was during its service on Folly Island during the siege of Charleston, South Carolina. Contaminated drinking water caused severe illnesses amongst almost the entire regiment. So many men became ill with diarrhea that a board of surgeons was appointed to determine which men would be eligible for furloughs so that they could recover from the sickness. A convalescent camp was established at St. Augustine, Florida where many of the men spent their illness-caused furloughs.

== Casualties ==
The regiment lost 217 men during service: 2 officers and 37 enlisted men killed and mortally wounded and 4 officers and 174 enlisted men by disease. The most frequent causes of death listed for the many members of the Regiment who died of disease included typhoid fever and chronic diarrhoea.

== Commanders ==
- Col. Robert S Hughston
- Col. David E. Gregory
- Col. William J. Slidell
- Col. James Lewis

== Surgeons ==
- Surgeon John R. Leal
- Assistant Surgeon O. T. Bundy
- Assistant Surgeon William M. Bryce

== See also ==
- List of New York Civil War regiments
- New York in the Civil War
- John L. Leal
