= Samuel Francis Smith =

Protestant Christian Minister Patriotic hymn writer

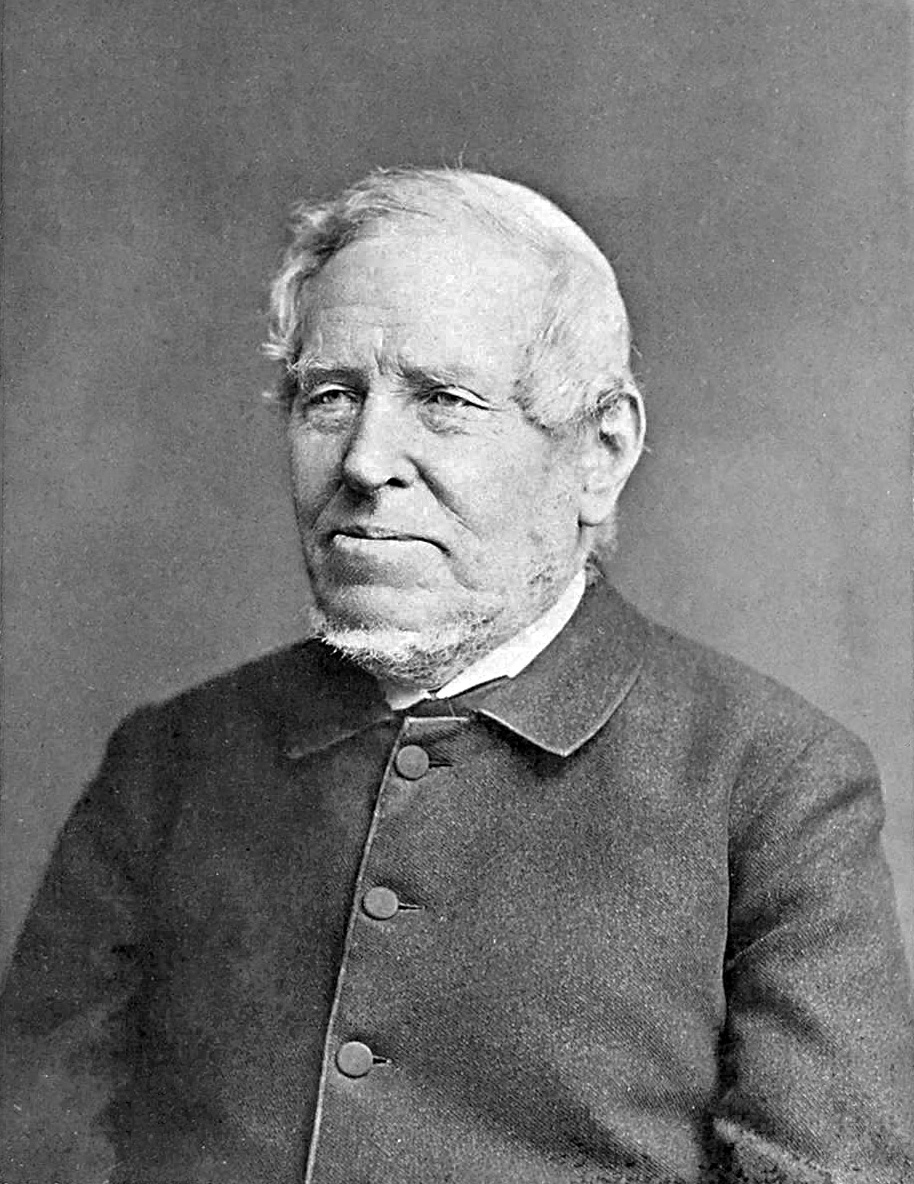
- Portrait of Samuel Francis Smith by Charles Delevan Mosher, 1890

Orders
- Ordination: February 12, 1834

Personal details
- Born: October 21, 1808 Boston, Massachusetts
- Died: November 16, 1895 (aged 87) Boston, Massachusetts
- Buried: Newton Cemetery, Newton, Massachusetts
- Denomination: Baptist
- Spouse: Mary White Smith (m. 1834)
- Children: 6, foster parent of Thornton Chase
- Occupation: Baptist minister; journalist; author
- Education: Harvard College (1829); Andover Theological Seminary (1834)
- Known for: Author of "My Country, 'Tis of Thee"
- Relatives: Emma Waldo Smith Marshall (granddaughter)
- Awards: Songwriters Hall of Fame (1970)

Samuel Francis Smith (October 21, 1808 – November 16, 1895) was an American Baptist minister, journalist, and author. He is best known for having written the lyrics to "My Country, 'Tis of Thee" (sung to the tune of "God Save the King"), which he entitled "America".

== Early life and education ==
Smith was born in Boston, Massachusetts on October 21, 1808.

Smith attended Harvard College from 1825 to 1829, and was a classmate of William Henry Channing, James Freeman Clarke, Benjamin Robbins Curtis, George T. Davis, Oliver Wendell Holmes Sr., Isaac Edward Morse, Benjamin Peirce, George W. Richardson, and Charles Storer Storrow.

From 1829 to 1834, he attended Andover Theological Seminary.

=== "America" ("My Country, 'Tis of Thee") ===
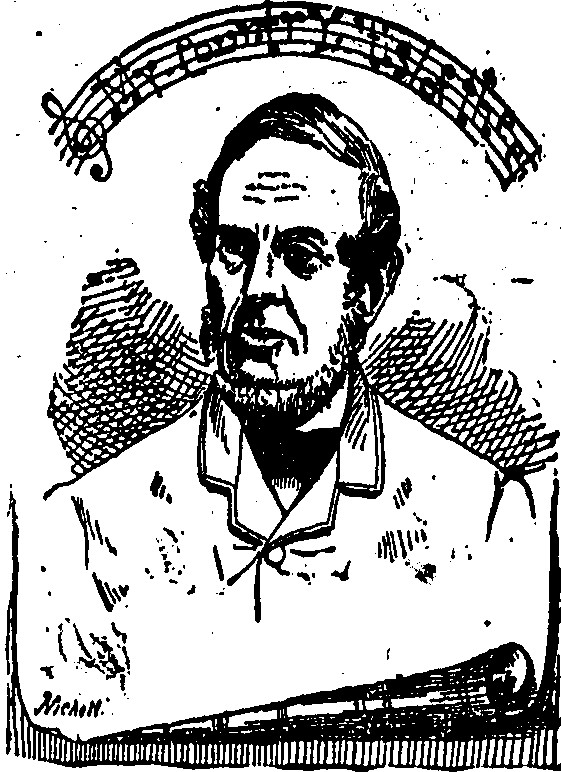
A sketch of Samuel Francis Smith from a life sketch in The Express

While a student at Andover Theological Seminary, Smith gave Lowell Mason lyrics he had written and the song was first performed in public on July 4, 1831, at a children's Independence Day celebration at Park Street Church in Boston. The song, titled "America", was first published by Lowell Mason in The Choir in 1832.

Smith later wrote an additional stanza for the April 30, 1889 Washington Centennial Celebration.

== Ministry ==
In 1834, Smith worked in Boston editing the Baptist Missionary Magazine before going to Maine. His ordination as a Baptist minister was on February 12, 1834, in Waterville, Maine, where in addition to his ministry, he served as Professor of Modern Languages at Waterville College.

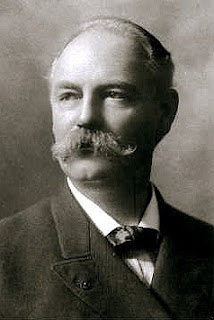
Samuel Francis Smith's foster son Thornton Chase, The first American Baháʼí

On September 16, 1834, Smith married Mary White Smith, whose maiden name was Smith. They had six children. Smith was foster father for four years to teenager Thornton Chase, who, instead of entering college, left to become an officer in the Civil War. In 1894–1895, Thornton Chase would become the first western convert to the Baháʼí Faith, and was a leading member in the United States.

In 1842, he left Waterville to go to Newton, Massachusetts. Smith did not stop writing. In addition to "My Country, 'Tis of Thee", Smith wrote over 150 other hymns. In 1843, he teamed with Baron Stow to compile a Baptist hymnal, The Psalmist.

In Newton, Smith became editor of the Christian Review and other publications of the Baptist Missionary Union. He continued his ministry as well, becoming pastor of the First Baptist Church in Newton in the village of Newton Centre. In Newton, Smith bought a house at 1181 Centre Street.

After twelve years as pastor of the Newton Centre church, he became editorial secretary of the BMU and served there for fifteen years.

From 1875 to 1880, he made many trips to Europe, Turkey, India, Ceylon and Burma to visit missionary outposts.

He wrote a history of his adoptive home, entitled History of Newton, Massachusetts, which was published in 1880.

Professor and author Oliver Wendell Holmes Sr. recommended Smith as a potential candidate for an honorary Doctor of Letters degree from Harvard University in 1893. Harvard president Charles William Eliot declined, noting that "My Country 'Tis of Thee" was better known for its tune, which Smith did not write, rather than its lyrics. Holmes disagreed, noting that "his song will be sung centuries from now, when most of us and our pipings are forgotten."

== Death and burial ==
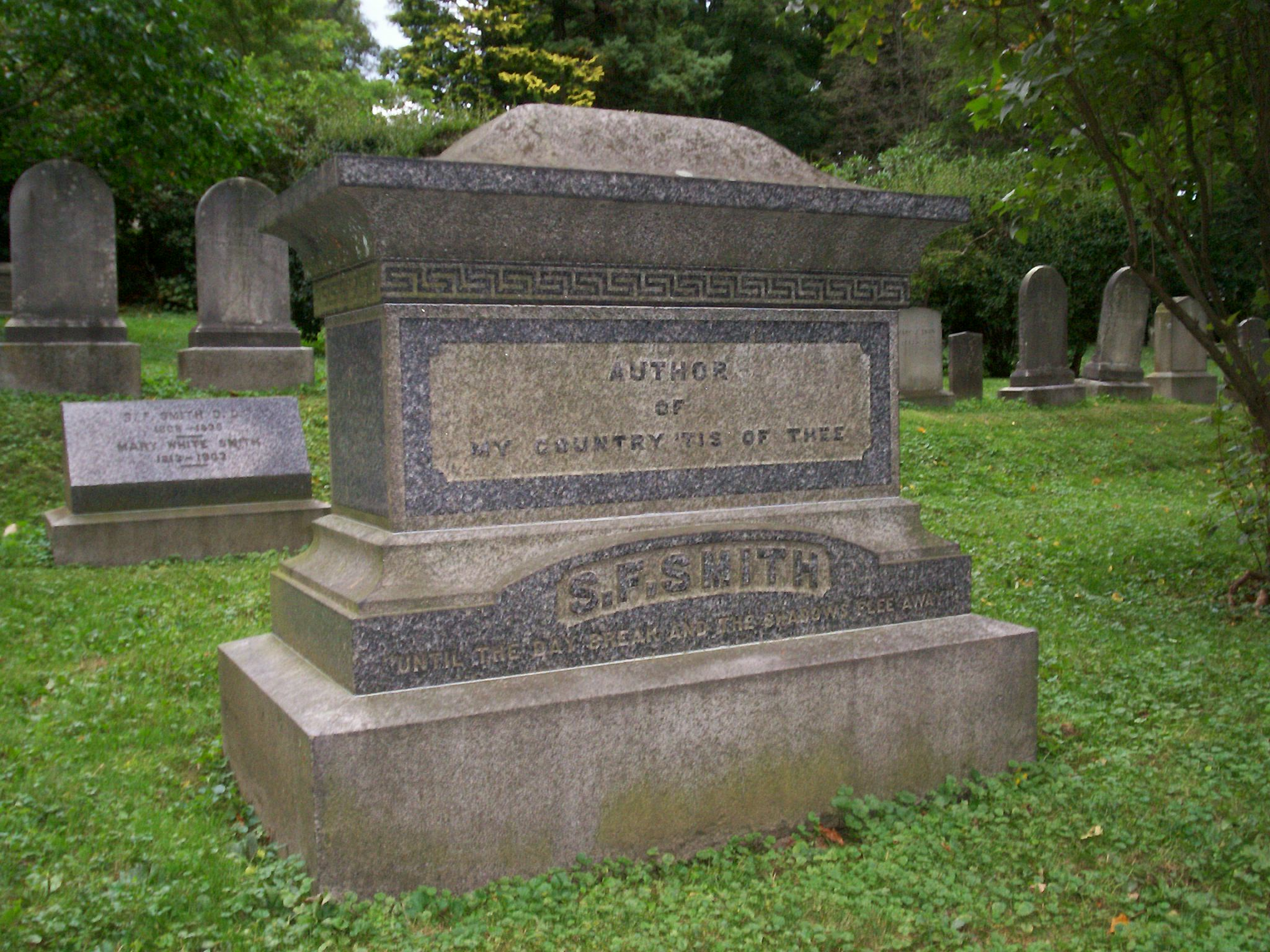
Grave of Samuel Francis Smith, in Newton, Massachusetts

Samuel Francis Smith died suddenly on November 16, 1895, while on his way by train to preach in the Boston neighborhood of Readville. He was buried in Newton Cemetery. "America" was among the pieces sung at his funeral. He was survived by his wife and five children. His son D. A. W. Smith was president of the Karen Baptist Theological Seminary in Burma; his granddaughter Emma Waldo Smith Marshall taught at the seminary.

== Legacy ==
Smith was inducted into the Songwriters Hall of Fame in 1970.

The home Smith lived in Andover is now a Phillips Academy dormitory named America House.

The home in which Smith and his family lived in Newton is no longer standing. In 1958, a society was formed to buy and preserve it, but the home was damaged by fire in 1968 and again in 1969, leading to its destruction. A small monument and growing garden honors his legacy.

== Bibliography ==
- Baron Stow; Samuel Francis Smith (1844). The Psalmist: A New Collection of Hymns for the Use of the Baptist Churches. Gould, Kendall, and Lincoln.
- Samuel Francis Smith (1880). History of Newton, Massachusetts: Town and City, from Its Earliest Settlement to the Present Time, 1630-1880. American Logotype Company.
- Samuel Francis Smith (1883). Rambles in Mission-fields. W.G. Corthell.
- Samuel Francis Smith (1887). Missionary Sketches: A Concise History of the Work of the American Baptist Missionary Union. W.G. Corthell.
- Samuel Francis Smith (1889). Discourse in Memory of William Hague. Lee and Shepard.
- Samuel Francis Smith (1895). Poems of Home and Country: Also, Sacred and Miscellaneous Verse. Silver, Burdett.

== Sources ==
- Hein, David. "S. F. Smith and 'America.'" Baptist Quarterly: Journal of the Baptist Historical Society 32 (1987): 134–40.https://biblicalstudies.org.uk/pdf/bq/32-3_134.pdf
- Music, David M., and Paul A. Richardson. I Will Sing the Wondrous Story: A History of Baptist Hymnody in North America. Macon, GA: Mercer University Press, 2008.
