= James Martin (South Carolina politician) =

South Carolina politician

James Martin (died October 5, 1868) was a Republican state legislator in South Carolina during the Reconstruction Era. He was born in Ireland, and his family moved to South Carolina when he was young. He worked in the mercantile business, married Anna Eliza, and had five children. After the Civil War, he was elected to the South Carolina House of Representatives, representing Abbeville County. He was assassinated on October 5, 1868, possibly by the Ku Klux Klan. Before his death, it was perceived that he had made "certain inflammatory appeals" to African Americans.
