= Battle of Tulifinny =

1864 engagement of the American Civil War

- Part of Sherman's March to the Sea
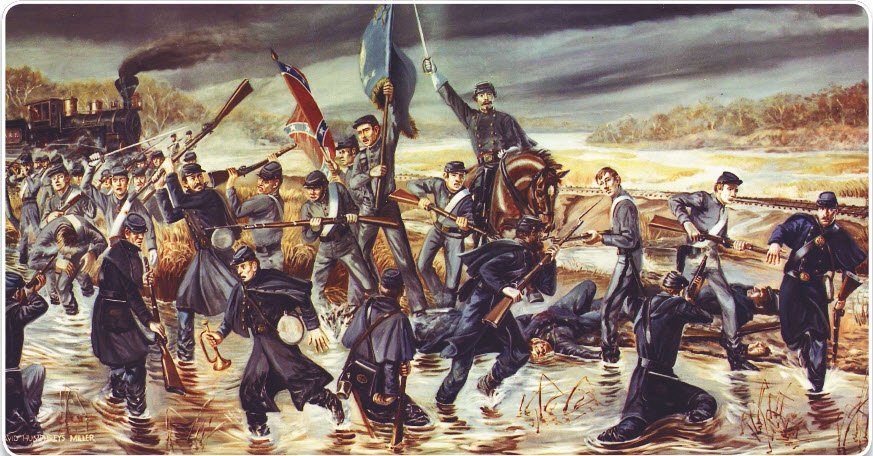
- A mural of the battle by David Humphreys Miller
Date	December 6–9, 1864
Location	Jasper County, South Carolina 32.673°N 80.879°W
Result	Confederate Victory

Belligerents
Confederate States	United States

Commanders and leaders
Samuel Jones	John G. Foster; John A. Dahlgren; George H. Preble

Strength
~900	~5,000

The Battle of Tulifinny was a military engagement of the American Civil War that was fought from December 6–9, 1864 in Jasper County, South Carolina during Sherman's March to the Sea. Outnumbered five-to-one, a Confederate force led by Major-General Samuel Jones, consisting in part of the entire cadet corps of the South Carolina Military Academy, successfully defended a strategically important section of the Charleston and Savannah Railway from attacks by Union forces. The engagement was one of the rare occasions when the United States Marine Corps fought in combat during the conflict.

== Background ==
In early December 1864, Major General William Tecumseh Sherman and his formidable army numbering an estimated 62,000 men approached the South Carolina border and their final objective of Savannah, Georgia. Sherman had ordered his men to apply "scorched earth" tactics which resulted in the burning of crops and homes, confiscation and killing of livestock and the consumption of any supplies available for his army. This total war strategy, though brutal was believed to cause mass desertion among Confederate troops and break the South's will to fight.

Tulifinny was one of eight engagements in which cadets from the South Carolina Military Academy (SCMA; also known as the Battalion of State Cadets) participated. The amphibious landing on the Tulifinny River conducted primarily by the United States Navy and United States Marine Corps was successful in moving 5,000 troops to Gregorie Point (also known as Deveaux's Neck) which is a peninsula bounded by the Tulifinny and Coosawatchie Rivers located near the town of Yemassee and some 45 miles north of Savannah. Much of the peninsula was covered with swamps, thick foliage and large trees. General Francis Marion, "The Swamp Fox" of American Revolutionary War fame fought the British and encamped near the Tulifinny on several occasions. The Union objective was to cut the Charleston–Savannah rail line by destroying a railroad trestle that crossed the Tulifinny River.

== Order of battle ==
=== Union ===
Estimated at a total of 5,000 men

==== U.S. Army ====
Military District of the South - Major General John G. Foster, Commanding; Brigadier General John Porter Hatch (Medal of Honor recipient); Brigadier General Edward E. Potter

Units
56th New York Infantry Regiment, 127th New York Infantry Regiment, 144th New York Infantry Regiment, 157th New York Infantry Regiment, 25th Ohio Infantry Regiment, 3d New York Light Artillery Regiment Battery F, 3d Rhode Island Heavy Artillery Regiment, 32d U.S. Colored Troops, 33d U.S. Colored Troops 102nd United States Colored Infantry Regiment, 34th U.S. Colored Troops

==== U.S. Navy ====
South Atlantic Blockading Squadron: Rear Admiral John A. Dahlgren, Commanding

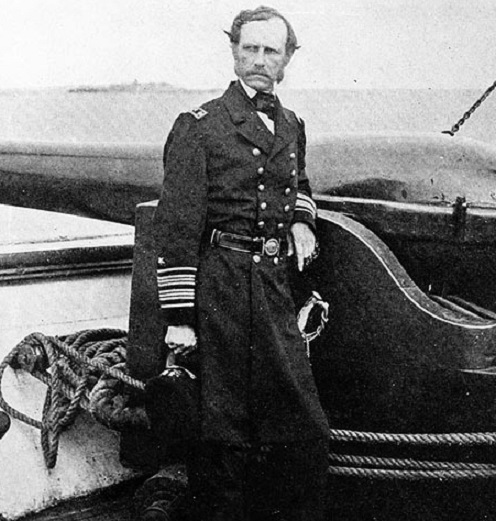
Rear Admiral John A. Dahlgren, "The Father of Naval Ordnance" who commanded the Union Navy vessels involved in the Battle of Tulifinny

Union Naval Vessels that participated in the amphibious landing at Tulifinny: USS St Louis, USS Pawnee, USS Canandaigua, USS Flag, USS New Hampshire, USS Sonoma, USS Mingoe, USS Pontiac, USS Saratoga, USS James Adger, USS Cimarron, USS Donegal

Commander George Henry Preble, Naval Support Brigade Ashore

==== U.S. Marine Corps ====
First Lieutenant (Acting Lieutenant Colonel) George G. Stoddard, Commanding

=== Confederate ===
Estimated at a total of 900 men.

==== Provisional Army of the Confederate States ====
3rd Military District of South Carolina - Major General Samuel Jones, Commanding; Brigadier General Lucius J. Gartrell; Brigadier General James Chesnut; Brigadier General Beverly Robertson

Units
5th Georgia Infantry

32nd Georgia Infantry

47th Georgia Infantry

1st Georgia Reserves

3rd Georgia Reserves

South Carolina Battalion of State Cadets

Bacon's South Carolina Militia

Charleston (Bachmann's) German Light Artillery

1st South Carolina Artillery (1 Company)

3rd South Carolina Cavalry

Kirk's South Carolina Cavalry Squadron

== The battle ==
=== Prelude ===
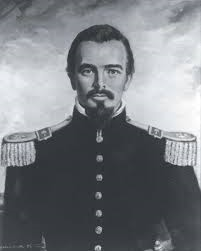
Major James B. White who served as Superintendent of the South Carolina Military Academy at the time of the battle

"Every Cadet acted with conspicuous gallantry and showed that the discipline of his Academy had made him a thorough soldier for the battlefield. The privations of the succeeding months proved him as well prepared for the hardships of the march and the camp."

In early December, 1864 the South Carolina Battalion of State Cadets, 343 strong, which consisted of the Citadel Academy in Charleston and the Arsenal Academy in Columbia was deployed to defend the state. Founded in 1842 the South Carolina Military Academy (now The Citadel) consisted of cadets who were enrolled at the Arsenal Academy for their first year then transferred to the Citadel Academy to complete the remaining three years of their education.

Major James B. White, SCMA Class of 1849 and Superintendent of SCMA, commanded the Battalion of State Cadets which consisted of Company A (Citadel cadets) and Company B (Arsenal cadets). Captain Hugh S. Thompson, Class of 1856 and Professor of Belles Letters and Ethics, served as commander of Company A and Captain John P. Thomas, Superintendent of the Arsenal Academy commanded Company B. Some Citadel cadets were assigned to Company B to serve as leaders and mentors to the younger Arsenal Academy cadets.

Upon arrival at Pocotaglio on December 6, the Battalion of Cadets marched at the "double quick" (a run) to reach the railroad trestle at the Tulifinny River four miles away. As the cadets reached the river they were met by Major John Jenkins, CSA, and were immediately dispatched to the area where Union troops were advancing toward the railroad. Unfortunately for them, they had arrived too late as the enemy was entrenched on the Gregorie Point peninsula and within striking distance of the railroad trestles that cross the Tulifinny and Coosawatchie Rivers. General Jones assigned the cadets to protect the strategic bridge that crosses the Tulifinny. Near the trestle they built entrenchments and fortifications and despite the fact that they had no shelters or tents they dubbed their new home "Camp Tulifinny". Those who were not sleeping served on guard duty and patrolled the local area to prevent a surprise attack. Before sunrise the cadets heard the news that Union forces were too close to the railroad line and they were ordered to mount an attack to drive them back. Under cover of darkness the entire force of cadets gathered their muskets and ammunition, fixed bayonets and prepared to attack.

=== Second day of battle ===
At sunrise on December 7 the skirmish line composed of Citadel cadets and three companies of the 5th Georgia Infantry, all under the command of Major White, advanced to test the strength of the Union forces occupying a fortified hill. The Arsenal cadets followed, with the 47th Georgia on the right and Colonel Bacon's militia on the left, as the skirmish line advanced swiftly across a field of brown broom grass and into a wooded area; as the force reached the far edge of the woods in front of the Union position they encountered a brisk fire. Farish Furman, a third class cadet from Greenville, S.C. later recalled "....marching through the woods when I saw a stream of fire shoot out from the bushes in front of me, accompanied by the sharp crack of a rifle,...I was the second man shot at by the enemy. The first had his jacket cut, the third (Greene) was shot in the face; the ball fired at me missed my head a few inches and buried itself in a tree close by."

The Confederate front shifted until it crossed a road at right angles, thus engaging the entire Union line; fighting became general against Union forces, who had deployed five regiments in a strong skirmish line. The Confederate troops and cadets, partially sheltered by trees, poured a heavy fire into the enemy. This surprise attack drove the union troops back several hundred yards to their original entrenchments. One of the Georgia veterans who had fought alongside General John B. Hood complimented the Battalion of State Cadets by saying, "Dang, them fellers fight like Hood's Texicans!" But the attack came at a high cost, several cadets and faculty/staff were wounded and one, Cadet William Patterson was killed. The remainder of the day and through the 8th was spent caring for wounded, guarding captured enemy troops and building entrenchments.

=== Third day of battle ===
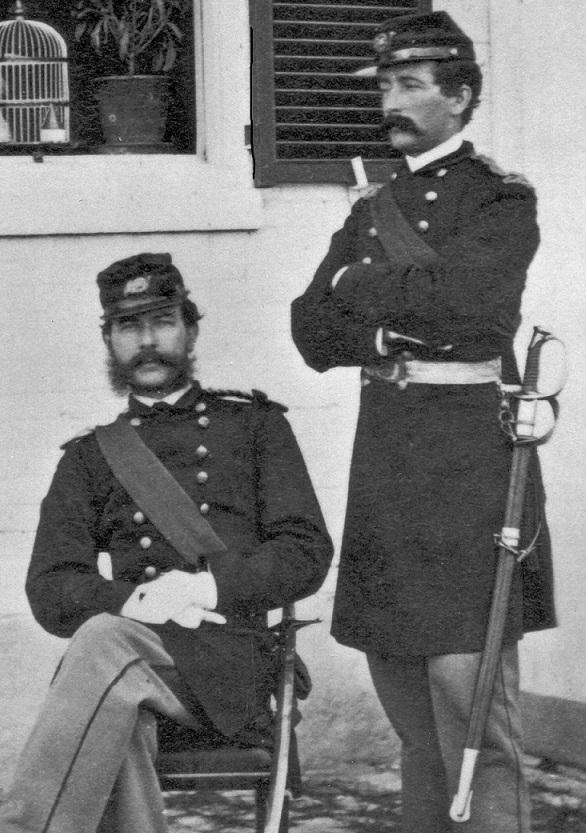
2Lt (Brevet LtCol) George Stoddard (standing) who commanded a battalion of US Marines at Tulifinny

On the morning of the 9th, the cadets repulsed a disciplined Union counterattack, the battalion of U.S. Marines fought on the extreme right of the union line engaging cadets who were encamped at Camp Tulifinny near the railroad trestle. The union forces were pushed back into their trenches and pursued through the thick swamp when their left flank gave way and they retreated by following the Tulifinny River southward. This was the last attack made by Union forces during the battle.

== After the battle ==
The Battalion of State Cadets remained at Camp Tulifinny until Christmas when they redeployed to James Island, near Charleston. After Tulifinny the SCMA cadets remained in the field for five more months; they were assigned to remain with the Confederate Army to assist with the evacuation of James Island and they marched as far north as Asheville, North Carolina before being recalled to their home state by the Governor.

Sherman's troops burned the Arsenal Academy in Columbia during their march to the sea and it never reopened. The Citadel Academy was seized by Union forces when Charleston fell a short time after the Tulifinny battle and they remained until 1882.

== Sources ==
- National Park Service battle description for the Savannah Campaign
- "Demonstrations against the Charleston and Savannah Railroad, S. C.". The War of the Rebellion: A Compilation of the Official Records of the Union and Confederate Armies. Vol. XLIV, Chapter LVI. Washington, DC: U.S. Government Printing Office. 1891. pp. 438–48. Archived from the original on February 23, 2025.

== Links ==
- The Citadel, The Military College of South Carolina
