= Vincent Colyer =

American artist

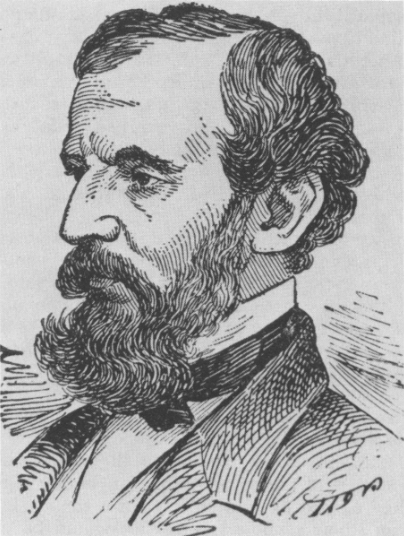
- Born: September 30, 1824; Bloomingdale, New York
- Died: July 12, 1888 (aged 63); Darien, Connecticut
- Known for: Painting, watercolor

Vincent Colyer (September 30, 1824 – July 12, 1888) was an American artist noted for his images of the American West. He was a humanitarian who worked with philanthropic and Christian groups; he founded the United States Christian Commission during the American Civil War. He also worked with the U.S. government to try to help freedmen and Native Americans.

== Early life and education ==
Colyer was born in the Bloomingdale, New York on September 30, 1824, and grew up in a Quaker family. His faith was the center of his life and the inspiration for many of his activities.

He studied art for four years in New York with John R. Smith, and then was a student at the National Academy. He became an associate member of the National Academy of Design in 1851. From then until the Civil War he painted in New York City.

== Marriage and family ==
Colyer married Mary Lydia Hancock, a grandniece of Massachusetts Governor John Hancock.

== Civil War ==
During the war, Colyer founded and served with the United States Christian Commission. As superintendent of the poor in New Bern, North Carolina under General Ambrose Burnside, he wrote the Report of the Services Rendered by the Freed People to the United States Army in North Carolina, in the Spring of 1862, After the Battle of Newbern (1864). With the government decision in 1863 to allow black troops to fight, Colyer began to recruit and train the men for the United States Colored Troops. He also served with the Indian commission.

== Traveling the West and Alaska ==
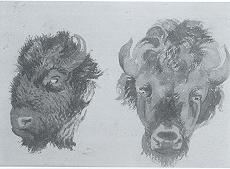
Study of Buffalo Heads (undated, private collection)

Colyer traveled the American West in 1868-1871. "He represented Friends of the Indians, a Quaker organization that was concerned with the humanitarian treatment of the native inhabitants in government custody. While he did not paint Indian portraits, his sketches reveal some of the earliest forts in Indian Territory and in the Southwest."

Colyer advocated the establishment of reservations for the Apache, Yavapai, and neighboring tribes in New Mexico and Arizona to improve their living conditions. This effort earned him the strong opposition of white mining, cattle and agricultural interests. His mission ended in failure.

His humanitarian work continued in 1869, when he surveyed conditions among natives of the just-acquired Alaska Territory on behalf of the newly created Board of Indian Commissioners (an advisory group of philanthropists and humanitarians who studied Indian conditions and made recommendations to the commissioner of Indian affairs). "His 1869 report is important because of its thoroughness, its presumptions, and, most particularly, its influence for more than a decade on officials concerned with the government's response to Alaska natives."

Colyer recommended the Federal government fund Indian schools in Alaska as well as provide medical care, a proposal endorsed by the Commissioner of Indian Affairs but rejected by Congress. Instead, partly due to Colyer's efforts, Congress approved money for education, to be spent through the Interior Department's Bureau of Education. This reduced the influence of the government's Indian agencies, which tended to establish more paternalistic relationships with Indians. In contrast, "the Bureau of Education encouraged independence and self-reliance," and tended to have more respect for native cultures. Colyer, a Quaker, was an ardent Christian assimilationist.

== Annexation of British Columbia to U.S.A. ==
Petitions circulated in favour of American annexation. The first, in 1867, was addressed to Queen Victoria, demanding that the British government assume the colony's debts and establish a steamer link, or allow the colony to join the U.S. In 1869, a second petition was addressed to President Ulysses S. Grant, asking him to negotiate American annexation of the territory from Britain. It was delivered to Grant by Vincent Colyer, Indian Commissioner for Alaska, on December 29, 1869. Both petitions were signed by only a small fraction of the colony's population, and British Columbia was ultimately admitted as a Canadian province in 1871.

In Alaska in 1869, he made numerous watercolor sketches, many incorporating weather phenomena. That year he is thought to have sketched 15 views of Oregon and the Washington Territory. When Colyer returned east and established his studio in Connecticut, he produced a small number of oil paintings of Western scenes in 1872-1875. They were prominently exhibited at the time, including at the Centennial Exposition of 1876.

== Later life ==
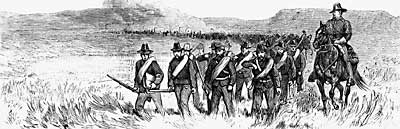
In Pursuit of Chief Joseph. The artist here idealizes infantry power, order, and confidence in the vicinity of Fort Lapwai. Colyer was touring northwest Indian reservations that summer. (Harper's Weekly, August 18, 1877, Library of Congress photograph)

In the 1860s, Colyer took a yachting trip up the Connecticut shore as far as New Haven, looking for a good spot to relocate his home and studio. He liked what he saw at one island and bought 40 acres (160,000 m^{2}) there. Colyer later renamed the isle "Contentment Island", still its name. (According to one town history, the former name, stated in old land records, was "Ox Pound", another gives it as "Contention Island.") The artist took an active part in civic affairs and served a term in the state House of Representatives.

He moved to Darien, Connecticut in the early 1870s and set up a studio named after his close friend John Kensett. On October 31, 1872, Colyer's wife, Mary Lydia drowned in Long Island Sound after her horse bolted as she was crossing the bridge by buggy to Contentment Island. Kensett got in the water and tried to save her. Soon he became sick (one source said from pneumonia; another said it was "a cold.") Kensett died on December 14, 1872.

After 1875, the artist concentrated on Connecticut scenes. In the summer of 1877, Colyer toured Indian reservations in the Northwest.

Vincent Colyer died at Contentment Island on July 12, 1888.

== Appreciation of his art ==
The Douglas Frazer Art gallery offers this assessment: "Vincent Colyer is an acknowledged master of American topographical watercolors. ... His small, painterly watercolor sketches of western forts, early settlements and Indian villages, from New Mexico to Alaska, are an important artistic and visual record. More than two hundred of those sketches, mostly accomplished in the field between 1868 and 1872 while working as a Special Indian Commissioner, are found in major institutional collections."

Beinecke Library at Yale University owns 50 of his Alaskan views made in 1869. "During his travels in the southwest and Alaska, he painted remarkable scenes of the landscapes, animals, and people he encountered."

Referring to works by both Colyer and another artist, the Gilcrease Museum in Tulsa, Oklahoma noted, "What these images might lack in aesthetic merit is made up for in charm and expressiveness as quick impressions of the West."

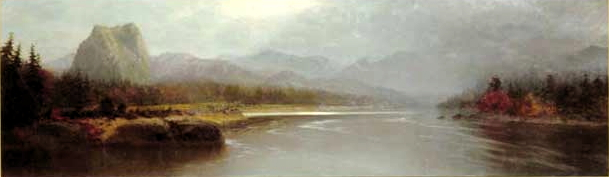
Columbia River, Cascade Mountains, Oregon (1876) by Vincent Colyer (oil on canvas, 19" x 60", signed in pencil on the stretchers), private collection, featured on the Douglas Frazer Fine Art website

== Some paintings and drawings ==
- Johnson Straits, British Columbia
- Columbia River (1875)
- Pueblo
- Passing Shower (1876)
- In Pursuit of Joseph, (appeared in Harper's Weekly, August 18, 1877) "Colyer here idealizes infantry power, order, and confidence in the vicinity of Fort Lapwai — probably before the White Bird defeat."
- Home of the Yackamas, Oregon (sold in 1968 for $16,500)
- Castle Rock, Entrance to the Cascade Mountains, Columbia River, (lost) "The subject alone gives marked interest to atmospheric effects," the catalogue for the 1873 Cincinnati Industrial Exposition said about the painting.
- Darien Shore, Connecticut
- Rainy Day on Connecticut Shore (1881)
- Winter on Connecticut Shore (1884)
- Spring Flowers (1885)
- French Waiter (1886)

== Public collections ==
- Royal British Columbia Museum and British Columbia Archives, Victoria, British Columbia
- Museum of Fine Arts, Boston
- Gilcrease Museum, Tulsa, Oklahoma
- Albuquerque Museum of Art
- Beinecke Rare Book and Manuscript Library, Yale University, New Haven, Connecticut

== Public exhibitions ==
- United States Centennial Commission International Exhibition, (Philadelphia, 1876)
- National Academy of Design
- American Art-Union
- Boston Athenaeum
- Pennsylvania Academy
- Maryland Historical Society
- Cincinnati Industrial Exposition, (1873)
- Yale School of Fine Arts, (1863)
- Chicago Interstate Industrial Exposition, (1875)
- Artist's Fund Society, (ca. 1863-1874)
- Gilcrease Museum, (July 19 – October 14, 2001) His works were among others in "Watercolors of the American West: Selections from the Gilcrease Museum Permanent Collection".

== His books ==
- Report of the Services Rendered by the Freed People to the United States Army in North Carolina, in the Spring of 1862, After the Battle of Newbern (1864) Online text here
- Notes Among the Indians (Putnam's: 1869) Online text here
- Colyer's Alaska report, which includes responses to inquiries he made and excerpts from official reports on Alaska, appears as appendix D to the Indian commissioner's annual report, 41st Cong., 2d Sess., 1869, H.E.D. 1, Pt. 3, pp. 975–1058 (Serial 1414)."
