= 1884 United States House of Representatives elections =

House elections for the 49th U.S. Congress

- November 4, 1884 (Note: Four states held early elections between June 2 and October 14.)

All 325 seats in the United States House of Representatives 163 seats needed for a majority
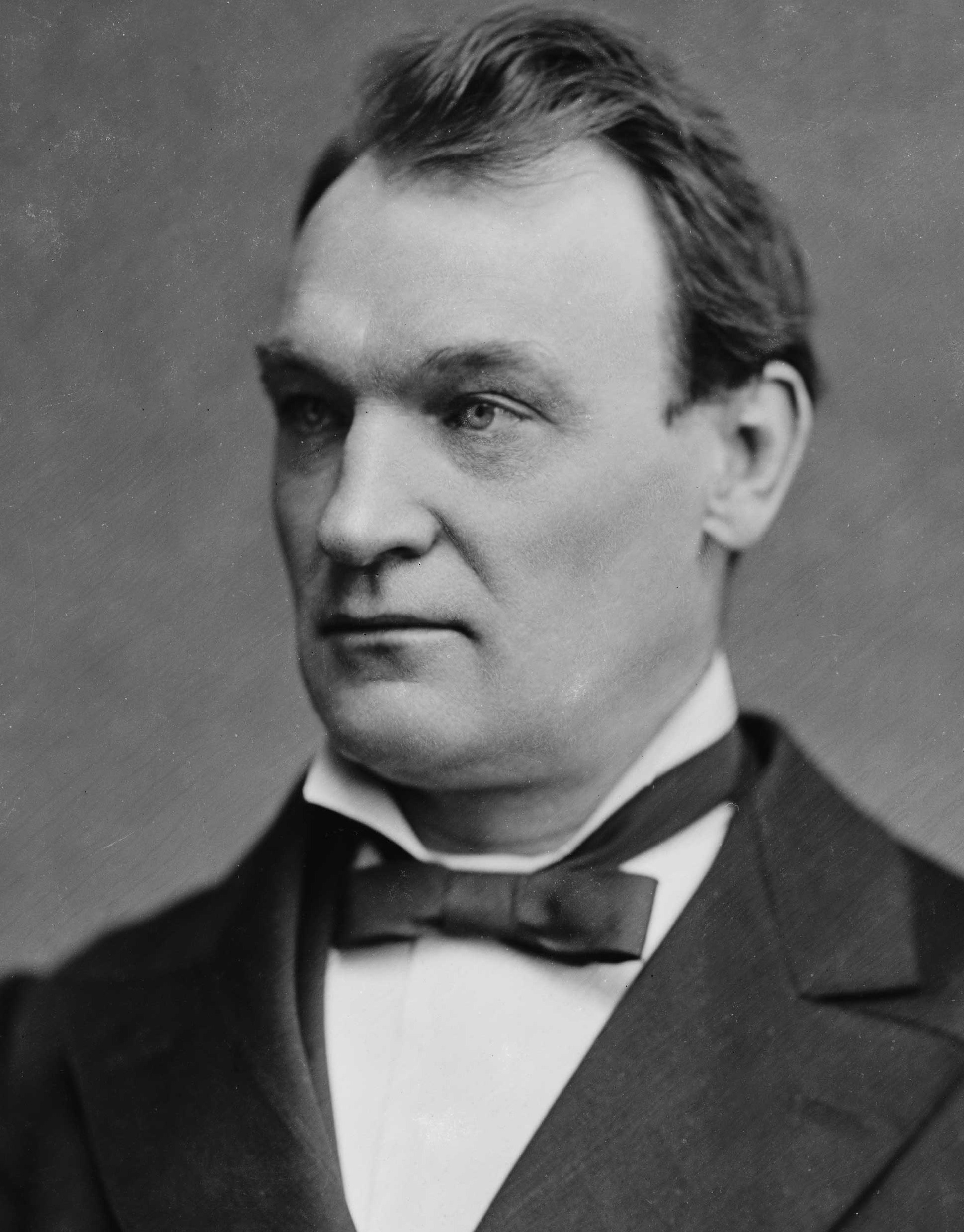

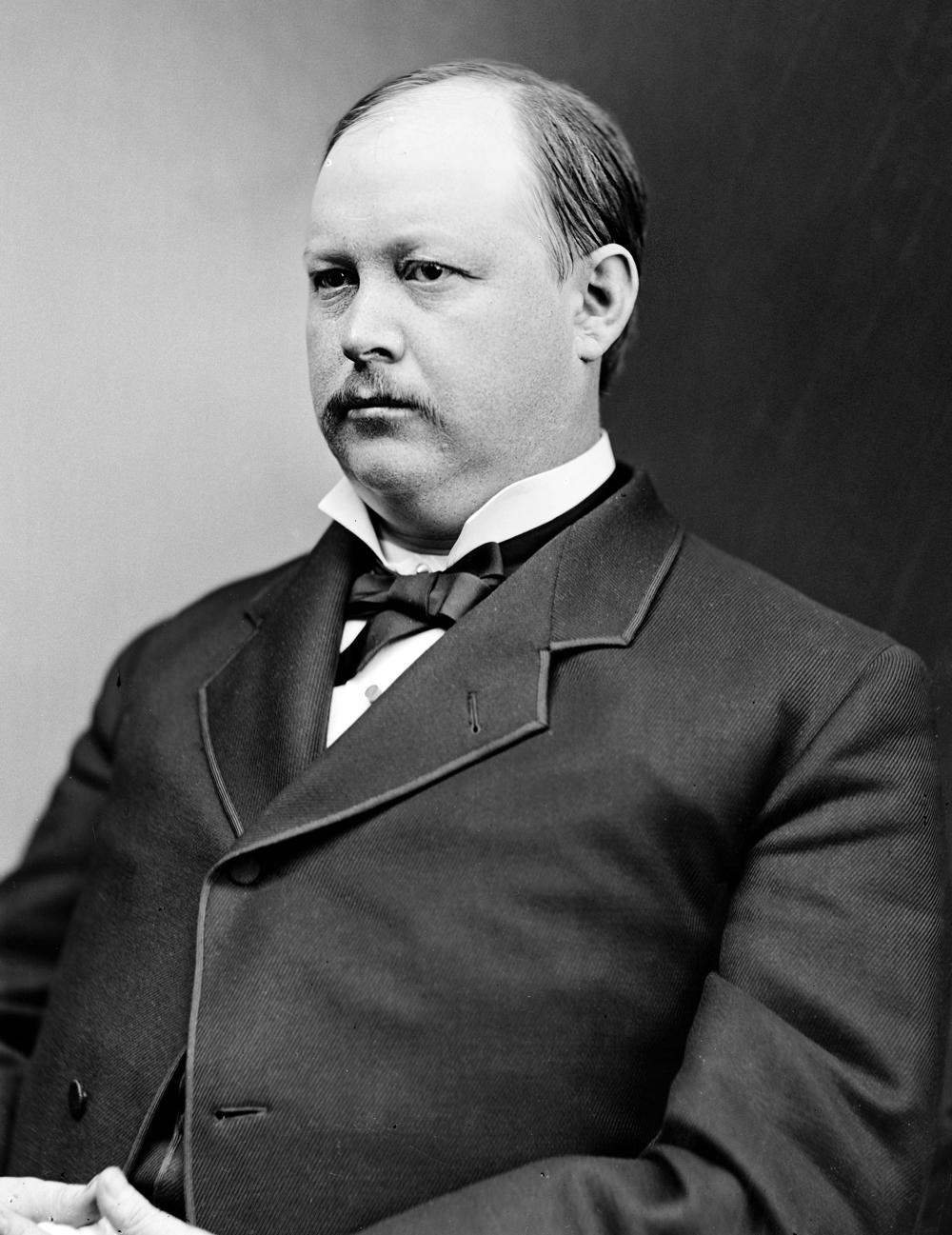
	Majority party	Minority party
Leader	John G. Carlisle	Thomas Brackett Reed
Party	Democratic	Republican
Leader's seat	Kentucky 6th	Maine 1st
Last election	196 seats	117 seats
Seats won	182 (Note: Dubin (p. 271) counts 182 Democrats, 142 Republicans, and 1 Greenback at the start of the 49th United States Congress.)	141
Seat change	▼14	▲24
Popular vote	4,954,599	4,665,184
Percentage	50.05%	47.13%
Swing	▲1.15pp	▲5.52pp
	Third party	Fourth party
Party	Greenback	Independent
Last election	2 seats	5 seats (Note: Included 2 Independent Democrats and 1 Independent Republican.)
Seats won	1	1 (Note: Includes 1 Independent Democrat, Truman A. Merriman of NY-11.)
Seat change	▼1	▼4
Popular vote	105,668	78,972
Percentage	1.07%	0.80%
Swing	▼1.99pp	▼2.68pp
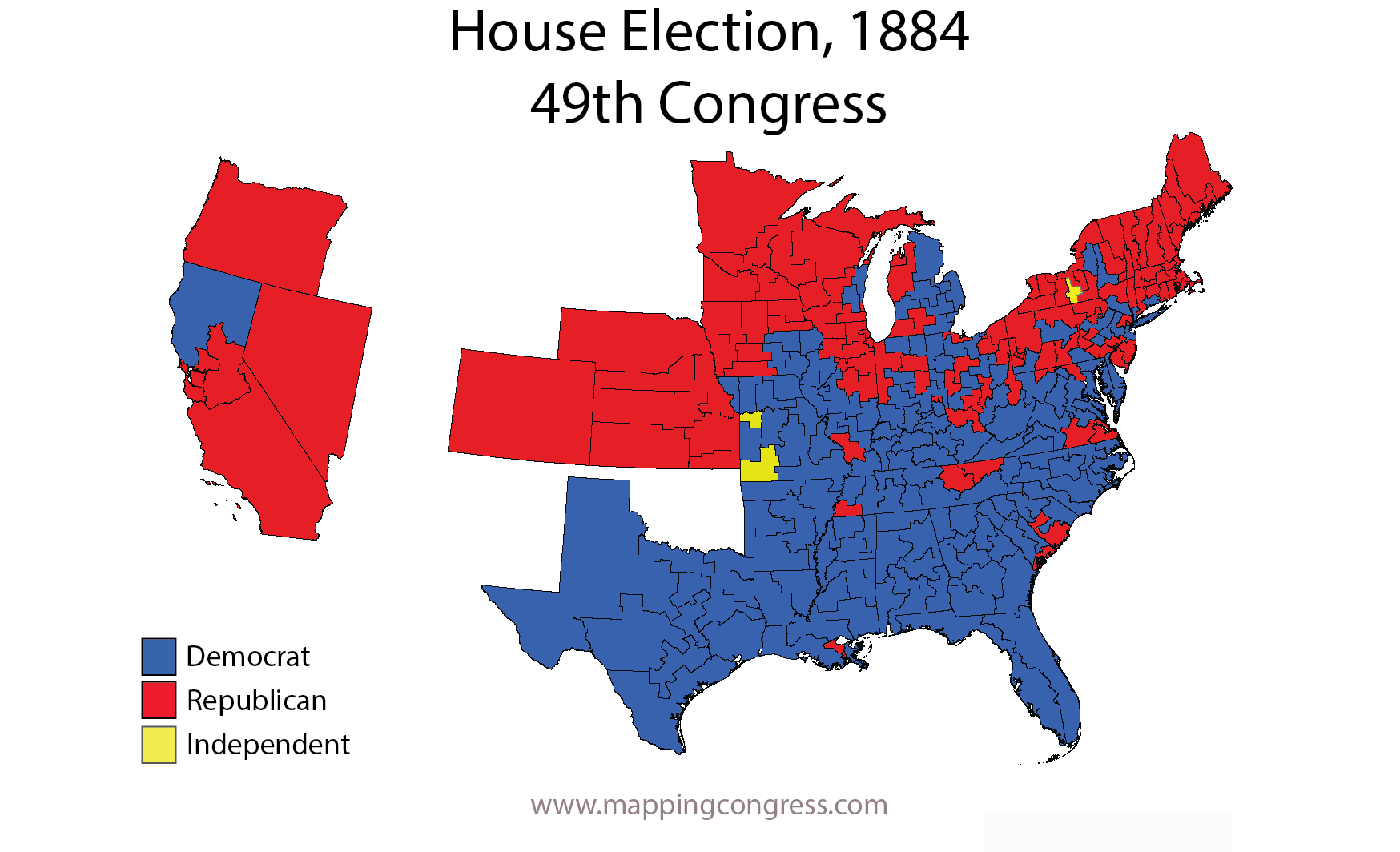
- Elections results from the 1884 elections
Speaker before election
John G. Carlisle
Democratic
Elected Speaker
John G. Carlisle
Democratic

The 1884 United States House of Representatives elections were held for the most part on November 4, 1884, with four states holding theirs early between June and October. They coincided with the election of President Grover Cleveland. Elections were held for 325 seats of the United States House of Representatives, representing 38 states, to serve in the 49th United States Congress. Special elections were also held throughout the year.

In spite of Cleveland's victory, the opposition Republican Party gained back some of the seats lost in 1882, but the Democratic Party retained a majority in the House. Republicans were able to make these slight gains by connecting their pro-business and industry message with progress. The Democrats were also hindered by the Panic of 1884, but were not greatly affected by it since the depression ended quickly.

== Election summaries ==
↓
183	1	141
Democratic	(Note: There was 1 Greenback member.)	Republican

State	Type	Total seats	Democratic		Republican		Others	
State	Type	Total seats	Seats	Change	Seats	Change	Seats	Change
Alabama	District	8	8	Steady	0	Steady	0	Steady
Arkansas	District (Note: At-large seats eliminated in redistricting.)	5	5	Steady	0	Steady	0	Steady
California	District	6	1	▼5	5	▲5	0	Steady
Colorado	At-large	1	0	Steady	1	Steady	0	Steady
Connecticut	District	4	2	▼1	2	▲1	0	Steady
Delaware	At-large	1	1	Steady	0	Steady	0	Steady
Florida	District	2	2	▲1	0	▼1	0	Steady
Georgia	District	10	10	Steady	0	Steady	0	Steady
Illinois	District	20	10	▲1	10	▼1	0	Steady
Indiana	District	13	9	Steady	4	Steady	0	Steady
Iowa	District	11	3	▲1	7	▼1	1 (Note: Greenback Party)	Steady
Kansas	District	7	0	Steady	7	Steady	0	Steady
Kentucky	District	11	10	▲1	1	▼1	0	Steady
Louisiana	District	6	5	Steady	1	Steady	0	Steady
Maine (Note: Elections held early.)	District (Note: Changed from at-large.)	4	0	Steady	4	Steady	0	Steady
Maryland	District	6	5	▲1	1	▼1	0	Steady
Massachusetts	District	12	2	▼1	10	▲1	0	Steady
Michigan	District	11	7	▲1	4	▼1	0	Steady
Minnesota	District	5	0	Steady	5	Steady	0	Steady
Mississippi	District	7	7	▲2	0	▼1	0	▼1 (Note: Independent in previous election.)
Missouri	District	14	12	▼2	2	▲2	0	Steady
Nebraska	District	3	0	Steady	3	Steady	0	Steady
Nevada	At-large	1	0	▼1	1	▲1	0	Steady
New Hampshire	District	2	0	Steady	2	Steady	0	Steady
New Jersey	District	7	3	Steady	4	Steady	0	Steady
New York	District	34	17	▼4	17	▲4	0	Steady
North Carolina	District	9	8	▲1	1	▼1	0	Steady
Ohio	District	21	11	▼2	10	▲2	0	Steady
Oregon	At-large	1	0	Steady	1	Steady	0	Steady
Pennsylvania	District + at-large	28	8	▼4	20	▲5	0	▼1
Rhode Island	District	2	0	Steady	2	Steady	0	Steady
South Carolina	District	7	6	Steady	1	Steady	0	Steady
Tennessee	District	10	7	▼1	3	▲1	0	Steady
Texas	District	11	11	▲1	0	Steady	0	▼1
Vermont	District	2	0	Steady	2	Steady	0	Steady
Virginia	District	10	8	▲2	2	▲2	0	▼4 (Note: Readjuster Party)
West Virginia	District	4	3	Steady	1	Steady	0	Steady
Wisconsin	District	9	2	▼4	7	▲4	0	Steady
Total		325	183 56.3%	▼12	141 43.4%	▲19	1 0.6%	▼7

Popular vote
Democratic	50.05%
Republican	47.13%
Greenback	1.07%
Independent	0.80%
Others	0.95%

House seats
Democratic	56.00%
Republican	43.38%
Greenback	0.31%
Independent	0.31%

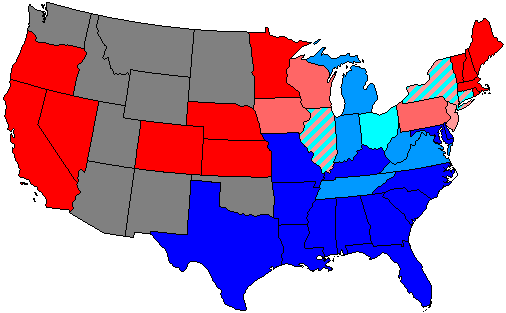
House seats by party holding plurality in state: 80+% Democratic / 80+% Republican; 60+ to 80% Democratic / 60+ to 80% Republican; Up to 60% Democratic / Up to 60% Republican

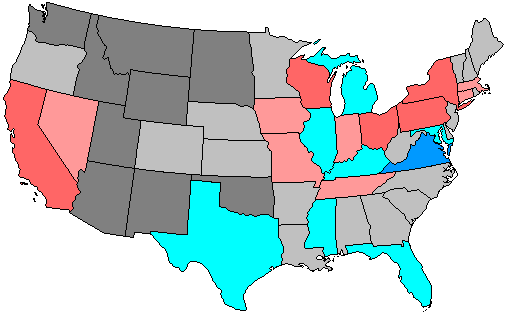
Net gain in party representation: 6+ Democratic gain / 6+ Republican gain; 3-5 Democratic gain / 3-5 Republican gain; 1-2 Democratic gain / 1-2 Republican gain; no net change

== Early election dates ==
In 1884, four states, with 28 seats among them, held elections early:

- June 2 Oregon
- September 2 Vermont
- September 13 Maine
- October 14 Ohio

== Special elections ==
District	Incumbent			This race	
District	Member	Party	First elected	Results	Candidates
Arkansas 3	James K. Jones	Democratic	1880	Incumbent resigned February 19, 1885. New member elected September 7, 1885. Democratic hold	▌ ✓ Thomas C. McRae (Democratic) 61.2%; ▌C. E. Mitchell (Independent) 38.8%
South Carolina 7	Edmund W. M. Mackey	Republican	1880	Incumbent died January 27, 1884. New member elected March 18, 1884. Republican hold.	▌ ✓ Robert Smalls (Republican) 100%; Unopposed
Iowa 7
Indiana 13	William H. Calkins	Republican	1876	Incumbent resigned October 20, 1884. New member elected November 4, 1884. Anti-Monopoly gain. Winner was not a candidate for the next term; see below.	▌ ✓ Benjamin F. Shively (Anti-Monopoly) 52.81%; ▌John Reynolds (Democratic) 47.19%
South Carolina 4	John H. Evins	Democratic	1876	Incumbent died October 20, 1884. New member elected November 12, 1884. Democratic hold. Winner was not a candidate for the next term; see below.	▌ ✓ John Bratton (Democratic) 100%; Unopposed
Kansas 2

== Alabama ==
District	Incumbent			This race	
District	Member	Party	First elected	Results	Candidates
Alabama 1	James T. Jones	Democratic	1883	Incumbent re-elected.	▌ ✓ James T. Jones (Democratic) 58.1%; ▌ F. H. Threat (Republican) 41.9%
Alabama 2	Hilary A. Herbert	Democratic	1876	Incumbent re-elected.	▌ ✓ Hilary A. Herbert (Democratic) 55.8%; ▌ J. M. Whitehead (Republican) 44.2%
Alabama 3	William C. Oates	Democratic	1880	Incumbent re-elected.	▌ ✓ William C. Oates (Democratic) 71.6%; ▌ Algernon A. Mabson (Republican) 28.4%
Alabama 4	George Henry Craig	Republican	1882	Incumbent lost renomination and lost re-election as an Independent Republican. Democratic gain.	▌ ✓ Alexander C. Davidson (Democratic) 63.7%; ▌ George Henry Craig (Independent Republican) 30.2%; ▌ Jeremiah Haralson (Republican) 3.1%; ▌ Ben DeLemos (Independent Republican) 3.0%
Alabama 5	Thomas Williams	Democratic	1878	Incumbent retired. Democratic hold.	▌ ✓ Thomas William Sadler (Democratic) 98.0%
Alabama 6	Goldsmith W. Hewitt	Democratic	1880	Incumbent retired. Democratic hold.	▌ ✓ John Mason Martin (Democratic) 99.3%
Alabama 7	William H. Forney	Democratic	1874	Incumbent re-elected.	▌ ✓ William H. Forney (Democratic) 63.3%; ▌ W. T. Ewing (Republican) 36.7%
Alabama 8	Luke Pryor	Democratic	1882	Incumbent retired. Democratic hold.	▌ ✓ Joseph Wheeler (Democratic) 52.8%; ▌ Lionel W. Day (Independent Republican) 47.2%

== Arkansas ==
District	Incumbent			This race	
District	Member	Party	First elected	Results	Candidates
Arkansas 1	Poindexter Dunn	Democratic	1878	Incumbent re-elected.	▌ ✓ Poindexter Dunn (Democratic) 61.7%; ▌Harmon L. Remmel (Republican) 38.8%
Arkansas 2	Clifton R. Breckinridge; Redistricted from the at-large district	Democratic	1882	Incumbent re-elected.	▌ ✓ Clifton R. Breckinridge (Democratic) 53.0%; ▌A. A. Rogers (Republican) 47.0%
Arkansas 3	James K. Jones; Redistricted from the 2nd district	Democratic	1880	Incumbent re-elected.	▌ ✓ James K. Jones (Democratic) 54.1%; ▌C. E. Mitchell (Republican) 45.9%
Arkansas 4	John H. Rogers; Redistricted from the 3rd district	Democratic	1882	Incumbent re-elected.	▌ ✓ John H. Rogers (Democratic) 57.3%; ▌John Sarber (Republican) 42.7%
Arkansas 5	Samuel W. Peel; Redistricted from the 4th district	Democratic	1882	New seat. Incumbent re-elected.	▌ ✓ Samuel W. Peel (Democratic) 69.1%; ▌W. R. Keener (Republican) 30.9%

== California ==
Two new districts were created for the seats gained in the 1882 reapportionment, eliminating the at-large district that had been created for them.

District	Incumbent			This race	
District	Member	Party	First elected	Results	Candidates
California 1	Barclay Henley; Redistricted from the 3rd district	Democratic	1882	Incumbent re-elected.	▌ ✓ Barclay Henley (Democratic) 49.7%; ▌Thomas L. Carothers (Republican) 49.3%; ▌C. C. Bateman (Prohibition) 1.0%
California 2	Charles A. Sumner; Redistricted from the at-large district	Democratic	1882	Incumbent lost re-election. Republican gain.	▌ ✓ James A. Louttit (Republican) 49.4%; ▌Charles A. Sumner (Democratic) 49.1%; ▌Joshua B. Webster (Prohibition) 1.5%
California 2	James Budd	Democratic	1882	Incumbent retired. Democratic loss.	▌ ✓ James A. Louttit (Republican) 49.4%; ▌Charles A. Sumner (Democratic) 49.1%; ▌Joshua B. Webster (Prohibition) 1.5%
California 3	John R. Glascock; Redistricted from the at-large district	Democratic	1882	Incumbent lost re-election. Republican gain.	▌ ✓ Joseph McKenna (Republican) 55.8%; ▌John R. Glascock (Democratic) 42.3%; ▌Joshua B. Wills (Prohibition) 1.0%; ▌A. B. Burns (Greenback) 0.9%
California 4	William Rosecrans; Redistricted from the 1st district	Democratic	1880	Incumbent retired. Republican gain.	▌ ✓ William W. Morrow (Republican) 58.8%; ▌R. P. Hastings (Democratic) 40.6%; ▌H. S. Fitch (Greenback) 0.5%; ▌George Herman Babcock (Prohibition) 0.1%
California 5	Pleasant B. Tully; Redistricted from the 4th district	Democratic	1882	Incumbent retired. Republican gain.	▌ ✓ Charles N. Felton (Republican) 51.7%; ▌Frank J. Sullivan (Democratic) 47.6%; ▌William Crowhurst (Prohibition) 0.7%
California 6	None (new district)			New district. Republican gain.	▌ ✓ Henry Markham (Republican) 49.1%; ▌R. F. del Valle (Democratic) 47.9%; ▌Will D. Gould (Prohibition) 2.3%; ▌Isaac Kinley (Greenback) 0.7%

== Colorado ==
District	Incumbent			This race	
District	Member	Party	First elected	Results	Candidates
Colorado at-large	James B. Belford	Republican	1884	Incumbent lost renomination. Republican hold.	▌ ✓ George G. Symes (Republican) 53.2%; ▌ Charles S. Thomas (Democratic) 43.1%; ▌ [FNU] Way (Greenback) 3.7%

== Connecticut ==
District	Incumbent			This race	
District	Member	Party	First elected	Results	Candidates
Connecticut 1	William W. Eaton	Democratic	1882	Incumbent lost re-election. Republican gain.	▌ ✓ John R. Buck (Republican) 49.5%; ▌William W. Eaton (Democratic) 48.6%; Others: ▌Samuel M. Hammond (Prohibition) 1.2%; ▌Albert F. Andrews (Greenback) 0.7%
Connecticut 2	Charles L. Mitchell	Democratic	1882	Incumbent re-elected.	▌ ✓ Charles L. Mitchell (Democratic) 50.8%; ▌Henry Allen (Republican) 46.3%; Others: ▌Henry C. Baldwin (Greenback) 1.6%; ▌Sidney A. Dowd (Prohibition) 1.2%
Connecticut 3	John T. Wait	Republican	1876 (special)	Incumbent re-elected.	▌ ✓ John T. Wait (Republican) 53.8%; ▌Charles S. Johnson (Democratic) 42.6%; Others: ▌Herbert J. Crocker (Prohibition) 2.4%; ▌James C. Vallette (Greenback) 1.2%
Connecticut 4	Edward W. Seymour	Democratic	1882	Incumbent re-elected.	▌ ✓ Edward W. Seymour (Democratic) 49.0%; ▌Lyman W. Coe (Republican) 48.6%; Others: ▌Clinton N. Strang (Prohibition) 1.6%; ▌James S. Taylor (Greenback) 0.8%

== Delaware ==
District	Incumbent			This race	
District	Member	Party	First elected	Results	Candidates
Delaware at-large	Charles B. Lore	Democratic	1882	Incumbent re-elected.	▌ ✓ Charles B. Lore (Democratic) 56.7%; ▌ Anthony Higgins (Republican) 43.2%

== Florida ==
District	Incumbent			This race	
District	Member	Party	First elected	Results	Candidates
Florida 1	Robert H. M. Davidson	Democratic	1876	Incumbent re-elected.	▌ ✓ Robert H. M. Davidson (Democratic) 55.1%; ▌Eugene O. Locke (Republican) 44.9%
Florida 2	Horatio Bisbee Jr.	Republican	1880	Incumbent lost re-election. Democratic gain	▌ ✓ Charles Dougherty (Democratic) 51.8%; ▌Horatio Bisbee Jr. (Republican) 47.6%; ▌Josiah T. Walls (Ind. Republican) 0.6%

== Georgia ==
District	Incumbent			This race	
District	Member	Party	First elected	Results	Candidates
Georgia 1	John C. Nicholls	Democratic	1882	Incumbent retired. Democratic hold.	▌ ✓ Thomas M. Norwood (Democratic) 64.4%; ▌ [FNU] Pleasant (Republican) 35.6%
Georgia 2	Henry G. Turner	Democratic	1880	Incumbent re-elected.	▌ ✓ Henry G. Turner (Democratic) 100.0%
Georgia 3	Charles F. Crisp	Democratic	1882	Incumbent re-elected.	▌ ✓ Charles F. Crisp (Democratic) 69.6%; ▌ B. F. Bell (Republican) 29.8%; ▌ [FNU] Reese (Independent Republican) 0.6%
Georgia 4	Hugh Buchanan	Democratic	1880	Incumbent retired. Democratic hold.	▌ ✓ Henry R. Harris (Democratic) 52.4%; ▌ Henry Persons (Independent Democratic) 27.0%; ▌ R. F. Milner (Republican) 20.5%
Georgia 5	Nathaniel J. Hammond	Democratic	1878	Incumbent re-elected.	▌ ✓ Nathaniel J. Hammond (Democratic) 63.7%; ▌ J. J. Martin (Republican) 36.3%
Georgia 6	James Henderson Blount	Democratic	1872	Incumbent re-elected.	▌ ✓ James Henderson Blount (Democratic) 100.0%
Georgia 6	Thomas Hardeman Jr. Redistricted from the at-large district	Democratic	1882	Incumbent retired. Democratic loss.	▌ ✓ James Henderson Blount (Democratic) 100.0%
Georgia 7	Judson C. Clements	Democratic	1880	Incumbent re-elected.	▌ ✓ Judson C. Clements (Democratic) 71.1%; ▌ [FNU] Kirkwood (Republican) 23.1%; ▌ [FNU] Hargrove (Independent Republican) 3.9%; ▌ [FNU] Mitchell (Independent Republican) 1.9%
Georgia 8	Seaborn Reese	Democratic	1882	Incumbent re-elected.	▌ ✓ Seaborn Reese (Democratic) 70.4%; ▌ [FNU] Martin (Republican) 29.2%
Georgia 9	Allen D. Candler	Democratic	1882	Incumbent re-elected.	▌ ✓ Allen D. Candler (Democratic) 100.0%
Georgia 10	None (new seat)			New seat. Democratic gain	▌ ✓ George Barnes (Democratic) 86.2%; ▌ [FNU] Wright (Republican) 12.0%; ▌ [FNU] Craig (Independent Republican) 1.8%

== Illinois ==
District	Incumbent			This race	
District	Member	Party	First elected	Results	Candidates
Illinois 1	Ransom W. Dunham	Republican	1882	Incumbent re-elected.	▌ ✓ Ransom W. Dunham (Republican) 56.7%; ▌ William W. Tilden (Democratic) 41.1%; ▌ [FNU] Clark (Greenback) 1.4%; ▌ [FNU] Gates (Prohibition) 0.8%
Illinois 2	John F. Finerty	Independent Democratic	1884	Incumbent lost re-election as Republican/Anti-Monopoly candidate. Democratic gain.	▌ ✓ Frank Lawler (Democratic) 54.7%; ▌ John F. Finerty (Republican/Anti-Monopoly) 45.3%; ▌ [FNU] Kellett (Prohibition) 0.1%
Illinois 3	George R. Davis	Republican	1878	Incumbent retired. Democratic gain.	▌ ✓ James Hugh Ward (Democratic) 43.5%; ▌ William E. Mason (Republican) 30.1%; ▌ Charles Fitzsimmons (Independent Republican) 24.9%; ▌ J. Lee (Greenback) 1.5%
Illinois 4	George E. Adams	Republican	1882	Incumbent re-elected.	▌ ✓ George E. Adams (Republican) 53.8%; ▌ John Peter Altgeld (Democratic) 44.9%; ▌ H. W. Austin (Prohibition) 1.3%
Illinois 5	Reuben Ellwood	Republican	1882	Incumbent re-elected.	▌ ✓ Reuben Ellwood (Republican) 68.4%; ▌ Richard Bishop (Democratic) 31.5%
Illinois 6	Robert R. Hitt	Republican	1882	Incumbent re-elected.	▌ ✓ Robert R. Hitt (Republican) 61.5%; ▌ E. W. Blaisdell (Democratic) 37.1%; ▌ [FNU] Meacham (Greenback) 1.4%
Illinois 7	Thomas J. Henderson	Republican	1874	Incumbent re-elected.	▌ ✓ Thomas J. Henderson (Republican) 57.6%; ▌ James S. Eckels (Democratic) 39.7%; ▌ [FNU] Haaff (Prohibition) 2.7%
Illinois 8	William Cullen	Republican	1880	Incumbent lost renomination. Republican hold.	▌ ✓ Ralph Plumb (Republican) 51.8%; ▌ Pat C. Haley (Democratic) 44.2%; ▌ [FNU] Wood (Greenback) 2.0%; ▌ [FNU] Kilburn (Prohibition) 2.0%
Illinois 9	Lewis E. Payson	Republican	1880	Incumbent re-elected.	▌ ✓ Lewis E. Payson (Republican) 53.4%; ▌ James Kirk (Democratic) 44.5%; ▌ James McGrew (Prohibition) 2.1%
Illinois 10	Nicholas E. Worthington	Democratic	1882	Incumbent re-elected.	▌ ✓ Nicholas E. Worthington (Democratic) 50.1%; ▌ Julius S. Starr (Republican) 49.6%; ▌ [FNU] Hammond (Greenback) 0.3%
Illinois 11	William H. Neece	Democratic	1882	Incumbent re-elected.	▌ ✓ William H. Neece (Democratic/Anti-Monopoly) 50.1%; ▌ Alexander P. Petrie (Republican) 48.9%; ▌ [FNU] Broadus (Prohibition) 1.0%
Illinois 12	James M. Riggs	Democratic	1882	Incumbent re-elected.	▌ ✓ James M. Riggs (Democratic) 57.7%; ▌ Thomas G. Black (Republican) 39.7%; ▌ [FNU] Parker (Greenback) 2.2%; ▌ [FNU] Wallace (Prohibition) 0.4%
Illinois 13	William McKendree Springer	Democratic	1874	Incumbent re-elected.	▌ ✓ William McKendree Springer (Democratic) 53.1%; ▌ James M. Taylor (Republican) 43.3%; ▌ [FNU] Harrington (Prohibition) 2.0%; ▌ [FNU] Knowles (Greenback) 1.6%
Illinois 14	Jonathan H. Rowell	Republican	1882	Incumbent re-elected.	▌ ✓ Jonathan H. Rowell (Republican) 51.4%; ▌ C. C. Clark (Democratic) 44.6%; ▌ W. P. Randolph (Prohibition) 3.6%; ▌ D. L. Braucher (Greenback) 0.7%
Illinois 15	Joseph Gurney Cannon	Republican	1872	Incumbent re-elected.	▌ ✓ Joseph Gurney Cannon (Republican) 50.2%; ▌ John C. Black (Democratic) 48.8%; ▌ [FNU] Thornton (Prohibition) 1.0%
Illinois 16	Aaron Shaw	Democratic	1882	Incumbent retired. Democratic hold.	▌ ✓ Silas Z. Landes (Democratic) 50.2%; ▌ James A. McCartney (Republican/Greenback) 49.2%; ▌ [FNU] Honey (Prohibition) 0.6%
Illinois 17	Samuel W. Moulton	Democratic	1880	Incumbent retired. Democratic hold.	▌ ✓ John R. Eden (Democratic) 55.0%; ▌ Howland J. Hamlin (Republican/Greenback) 43.5%; ▌ [FNU] Gomer (Prohibition) 1.5%
Illinois 18	William Ralls Morrison	Democratic	1872	Incumbent re-elected.	▌ ✓ William Ralls Morrison (Democratic) 53.2%; ▌ Thomas B. Needles (Republican) 45.5%; ▌ William K. Moore (Prohibition) 1.3%
Illinois 19	Richard W. Townshend	Democratic	1876	Incumbent re-elected.	▌ ✓ Richard W. Townshend (Democratic) 56.7%; ▌ Thomas S. Ridgway (Republican) 42.2%
Illinois 20	John R. Thomas	Republican	1878	Incumbent re-elected.	▌ ✓ John R. Thomas (Republican) 52.1%; ▌ Fountain E. Albright (Democratic) 45.9%; ▌ [FNU] Davis (Prohibition) 2.0%

== Indiana ==
District	Incumbent			This race	
District	Member	Party	First elected	Results	Candidates
Indiana 1	John J. Kleiner	Democratic	1882	Incumbent re-elected.	▌ ✓ John J. Kleiner (Democratic) 51.5%; ▌ William H. Gudgel (Republican) 47.8%; ▌ Francis M. English (Greenback) 0.7%
Indiana 2	Thomas R. Cobb	Democratic	1876	Incumbent re-elected.	▌ ✓ Thomas R. Cobb (Democratic) 55.5%; ▌ George H. Reilley (Republican) 44.6%
Indiana 3	Strother M. Stockslager	Democratic	1880	Incumbent lost renomination. Democratic hold.	▌ ✓ Jonas G. Howard (Democratic) 56.3%; ▌ James Keigwin (Republican) 43.0%; ▌ [FNU] Hudson (Greenback) 0.7%
Indiana 4	William S. Holman	Democratic	1880	Incumbent re-elected.	▌ ✓ William S. Holman (Democratic) 52.6%; ▌ John O. Cravens (Republican) 47.2%; ▌ Augustus Welch (Greenback) 0.2%
Indiana 5	Courtland C. Matson	Democratic	1880	Incumbent re-elected.	▌ ✓ Courtland C. Matson (Democratic) 51.3%; ▌ George W. Grubbs (Republican) 47.4%; ▌ [FNU] Burton (Greenback) 1.3%
Indiana 6	Thomas M. Browne	Republican	1876	Incumbent re-elected.	▌ ✓ Thomas M. Browne (Republican) 61.1%; ▌ Nelson G. Smith (Democratic) 37.7%; ▌ [FNU] Jeffries (Greenback) 1.2%
Indiana 7	William E. English	Democratic	1882	Incumbent retired. Democratic hold.	▌ ✓ William D. Bynum (Democratic) 51.0%; ▌ Stanton J. Peelle (Republican) 47.9%; ▌ [FNU] Tomlinson (Prohibition) 0.7%; ▌ [FNU] Young (Greenback) 0.4%
Indiana 8	John E. Lamb	Democratic	1882	Incumbent lost re-election. Republican gain.	▌ ✓ James T. Johnston (Republican) 50.0%; ▌ John E. Lamb (Democratic) 49.6%; ▌ Andrew Tomlinson (Prohibition) 0.4%
Indiana 9	Thomas B. Ward	Democratic	1882	Incumbent re-elected.	▌ ✓ Thomas B. Ward (Democratic) 49.7%; ▌ Charles T. Doxey (Republican) 48.1%; ▌ [FNU] Cotton (Greenback) 1.5%; ▌ Cornelius M. Riggin (Prohibition) 0.7%
Indiana 10	Thomas Jefferson Wood	Democratic	1882	Incumbent lost re-election. Republican gain.	▌ ✓ William D. Owen (Republican) 50.0%; ▌ Thomas Jefferson Wood (Democratic) 48.8%; ▌ N. J. Bozorth (Greenback) 1.2%
Indiana 11	George Washington Steele	Republican	1880	Incumbent re-elected.	▌ ✓ George Washington Steele (Republican) 48.7%; ▌ Meredith H. Kidd (Democratic) 48.6%; ▌ [FNU] Pleas (Greenback) 2.7%
Indiana 12	Robert Lowry	Democratic	1882	Incumbent re-elected.	▌ ✓ Robert Lowry (Democratic) 52.5%; ▌ T. P. Keator (Republican) 45.7%; ▌ [FNU] Hatsuck (Greenback) 1.0%; ▌ [FNU] Gale (Prohibition) 0.8%
Indiana 13	Benjamin F. Shively	Anti-Monopolist	1884	Incumbent retired. Democratic gain.	▌ ✓ George Ford (Democratic) 52.7%; ▌ Henry G. Thayer (Republican) 47.3%

== Iowa ==
District	Incumbent			This race	
District	Member	Party	First elected	Results	Candidates
Iowa 1	Moses A. McCoid	Republican	1878	Incumbent lost renomination. Democratic gain.	▌ ✓ Benton Jay Hall (Democratic) 50.0%; ▌ John Simson Woolson (Republican) 49.7%; ▌ [FNU] Palmer (Greenback) 0.3%
Iowa 2	Jeremiah H. Murphy	Democratic	1882	Incumbent re-elected.	▌ ✓ Jeremiah H. Murphy (Democratic) 56.4%; ▌ William T. Shaw (Republican) 43.6%
Iowa 3	David B. Henderson	Republican	1882	Incumbent re-elected.	▌ ✓ David B. Henderson (Republican) 52.1%; ▌ John J. Linehan (Democratic/Greenback) 47.9%
Iowa 4	Luman Hamlin Weller	Greenback	1882	Incumbent lost re-election. Republican gain.	▌ ✓ William E. Fuller (Republican) 50.4%; ▌ Luman Hamlin Weller (Greenback/Democratic) 49.6%
Iowa 5	Benjamin T. Frederick	Democratic	1882	Incumbent re-elected.	▌ ✓ Benjamin T. Frederick (Democratic) 50.2%; ▌ Milo P. Smith (Republican) 49.7%; ▌ [FNU] Lewis (Greenback) 0.1%
Iowa 6	John C. Cook	Democratic	1883	Incumbent lost renomination. Greenback gain.	▌ ✓ James B. Weaver (Greenback/Democratic) 50.1%; ▌ Frank T. Campbell (Republican) 49.9%
Iowa 7	Hiram Y. Smith	Republican	1884	Incumbent retired. Republican hold.	▌ ✓ Edwin H. Conger (Republican) 54.8%; ▌ W. H. McHenry (Democratic) 45.2%
Iowa 8	William P. Hepburn	Republican	1880	Incumbent re-elected.	▌ ✓ William P. Hepburn (Republican) 53.6%; ▌ S. R. Davis (Democratic/Greenback) 46.4%
Iowa 9	William H. M. Pusey	Democratic	1882	Incumbent lost re-election. Republican gain.	▌ ✓ Joseph Lyman (Republican) 50.7%; ▌ William H. M. Pusey (Democratic/Greenback) 49.2%
Iowa 10	Adoniram J. Holmes	Republican	1882	Incumbent re-elected.	▌ ✓ Adoniram J. Holmes (Republican) 62.7%; ▌ H. C. McCoy (Democratic/Greenback) 37.3%
Iowa 11	Isaac S. Struble	Republican	1882	Incumbent re-elected.	▌ ✓ Isaac S. Struble (Republican) 58.4%; ▌ Thomas F. Barbee (Democratic/Greenback) 41.6%

== Kansas ==
District	Incumbent			This race	
District	Member	Party	First elected	Results	Candidates
Kansas 1	Edmund N. Morrill; Redistricted from the at-large district	Republican	1882	Incumbent re-elected.	▌ ✓ Edmund N. Morrill (Republican) 55.1%; ▌ Thomas P. Fenlon (Democratic) 44.9%
Kansas 2	Edward H. Funston	Republican	1884	Incumbent re-elected.	▌ ✓ Edward H. Funston (Republican) 60.4%; ▌ W. J. Nicholson (Democratic/Greenback) 39.4%
Kansas 3	Bishop W. Perkins; Redistricted from the at-large district	Republican	1882	Incumbent re-elected.	▌ ✓ Bishop W. Perkins (Republican) 56.3%; ▌ G. W. Gabriel (Democratic) 31.5%; ▌ W. A. Tipton (Greenback) 12.2%
Kansas 4	Thomas Ryan; Redistricted from the 3rd district	Republican	1876	Incumbent re-elected.	▌ ✓ Thomas Ryan (Republican) 61.9%; ▌ Samuel Newitt Wood (Democratic) 37.4%; ▌ [FNU] Melvin (Independent) 0.7%
Kansas 5	John Alexander Anderson; Redistricted from the 1st district	Republican	1878	Incumbent re-elected.	▌ ✓ John Alexander Anderson (Republican) 64.1%; ▌ A. A. Carnahan (Democratic) 30.9%; ▌ M. D. Tenney (Greenback) 5.1%
Kansas 6	Lewis Hanback; Redistricted from the at-large district	Republican	1882	Incumbent re-elected.	▌ ✓ Lewis Hanback (Republican) 59.5%; ▌ L. C. Uhl (Democratic/Greenback) 40.5%
Kansas 7	Samuel R. Peters; Redistricted from the at-large district	Republican	1882	Incumbent re-elected.	▌ ✓ Samuel R. Peters (Republican) 61.0%; ▌ H. M. Bickel (Democratic) 37.7%; ▌ [FNU] Arnott (Greenback) 1.3%

== Kentucky ==
District	Incumbent			This race	
District	Member	Party	First elected	Results	Candidates
Kentucky 1	Oscar Turner	Independent Democratic	1878	Incumbent lost re-election. Democratic gain.	▌ ✓ William Johnson Stone (Democratic) 41.8%; ▌ Oscar Turner (Independent Democratic) 29.6%; ▌ H. H. Houston (Republican) 28.5%
Kentucky 2	James F. Clay	Democratic	1882	Incumbent lost renomination. Democratic hold.	▌ ✓ Polk Laffoon (Democratic) 56.8%; ▌ J. Z. Moore (Republican) 43.2%
Kentucky 3	John E. Halsell	Democratic	1882	Incumbent re-elected.	▌ ✓ John E. Halsell (Democratic) 55.3%; ▌ Jacob Golladay (Republican) 44.7%
Kentucky 4	Thomas A. Robertson	Democratic	1882	Incumbent re-elected.	▌ ✓ Thomas A. Robertson (Democratic) 100.0%
Kentucky 5	Albert S. Willis	Democratic	1876	Incumbent re-elected,	▌ ✓ Albert S. Willis (Democratic) 59.0%; ▌ Augustus E. Willson (Republican) 40.7%
Kentucky 6	John G. Carlisle	Democratic	1876	Incumbent re-elected.	▌ ✓ John G. Carlisle (Democratic) 60.6%; ▌ J. J. Landrum (Republican) 37.1%
Kentucky 7	J. C. S. Blackburn	Democratic	1874	Incumbent retired to run for U.S. Senator. Democratic hold.	▌ ✓ W. C. P. Breckinridge (Democratic) 93.2%; ▌ D. W. Lindsey (Republican) 6.7%
Kentucky 8	Philip B. Thompson Jr.	Democratic	1878	Incumbent retired. Democratic hold.	▌ ✓ James B. McCreary (Democratic) 53.9%; ▌ James M. Sebastian (Republican) 46.1%
Kentucky 9	William Wirt Culbertson	Republican	1882	Incumbent retired. Republican hold.	▌ ✓ William H. Wadsworth (Republican) 50.2%; ▌ Frank Powers (Democratic) 49.8%
Kentucky 10	John D. White	Republican	1880	Incumbent retired. Democratic gain.	▌ ✓ William P. Taulbee (Democratic) 53.7%; ▌ A. J. Auxier (Republican) 46.3%
Kentucky 11	Frank Lane Wolford	Democratic	1882	Incumbent re-elected.	▌ ✓ Frank Lane Wolford (Democratic) 52.0%; ▌ W. W. Jones (Republican) 48.0%

== Louisiana ==
District	Incumbent			This race	
District	Member	Party	First elected	Results	Candidates
Louisiana 1	Carleton Hunt	Democratic	1882	Incumbent lost re-election as a Reform Democratic candidate. Democratic hold.	▌ ✓ Louis St. Martin (Democratic) 41.9%; ▌ Carleton Hunt (Reform Democratic) 32.9%; ▌ J. A. Acklin (Republican) 25.2%
Louisiana 2	E. John Ellis	Democratic	1874	Incumbent retired. Republican gain.	▌ ✓ Michael Hahn (Republican) 54.7%; ▌ W. T. Houston (Democratic) 45.4%
Louisiana 3	William Pitt Kellogg	Republican	1882	Incumbent lost re-election. Democratic gain.	▌ ✓ Edward J. Gay (Democratic) 51.2%; ▌ William Pitt Kellogg (Republican) 48.8%
Louisiana 4	Newton C. Blanchard	Democratic	1880	Incumbent re-elected.	▌ ✓ Newton C. Blanchard (Democratic) 89.9%; ▌ J. B. Slattery (Republican) 10.1%
Louisiana 5	J. Floyd King	Democratic	1878	Incumbent re-elected.	▌ ✓ J. Floyd King (Democratic) 59.1%; ▌ Charles J. Boatner (Independent Democratic) 27.9%; ▌ Frank Morey (Republican) 13.0%
Louisiana 6	Edward T. Lewis	Democratic	1883	Incumbent lost renomination. Democratic hold.	▌ ✓ Alfred Briggs Irion (Democratic) 61.6%; ▌ C. C. Swayzie (Republican) 38.4%

== Maine ==
District	Incumbent			This race	
District	Member	Party	First elected	Results	Candidates
Maine 1	Thomas B. Reed; Redistricted from the at-large district	Republican	1876	Incumbent re-elected.	▌ ✓ Thomas B. Reed (Republican) 51.03%; ▌Nathan Cleeves (Democratic) 48.35%; ▌Aaron Clark (Greenback) 0.55%
Maine 2	Nelson Dingley Jr. Redistricted from the at-large district	Republican	1881 (special)	Incumbent re-elected.	▌ ✓ Nelson Dingley Jr. (Republican) 55.10%; ▌David R. Hastings (Democratic) 39.76%; ▌Wilder W. Perry (Greenback) 4.39%; ▌Reuben S. Hunt (Prohibition) 0.75%
Maine 3	Seth L. Milliken; Redistricted from the at-large district	Republican	1882	Incumbent re-elected.	▌ ✓ Seth L. Milliken (Republican) 58.37%; ▌Daniel H. Thing (Democratic) 40.30%; Others: ▌Luther C. Bateman (Greenback) 0.95%; ▌Joseph E. Ladd (Prohibition) 0.37%
Maine 4	Charles A. Boutelle; Redistricted from the at-large district	Republican	1882	Incumbent re-elected.	▌ ✓ Charles A. Boutelle (Republican) 56.65%; ▌John F. Lynch (Democratic) 40.85%; Others: ▌Seth B. Sprague (Prohibition) 1.71%; ▌Charles B. Besse (Greenback) 0.79%

== Maryland ==
District	Incumbent			This race	
District	Member	Party	First elected	Results	Candidates
Maryland 1	George W. Covington	Democratic	1880	Incumbent retired. Democratic hold.	▌ ✓ Charles H. Gibson (Democratic) 53.3%; ▌ George M. Russom (Republican) 46.7%
Maryland 2	J. Frederick C. Talbott	Democratic	1878	Incumbent retired. Democratic hold.	▌ ✓ Frank T. Shaw (Democratic) 53.8%; ▌ T. C. Blair (Republican) 46.3%
Maryland 3	Fetter Schrier Hoblitzell	Democratic	1880	Incumbent retired. Democratic hold.	▌ ✓ William Hinson Cole (Democratic) 58.6%; ▌ W. F. Pentz (Republican) 39.3%; ▌ [FNU] Silverwood (Prohibition) 2.1%
Maryland 4	John Van Lear Findlay	Democratic	1882	Incumbent re-elected.	▌ ✓ John Van Lear Findlay (Democratic) 51.2%; ▌ Sebastien Brown (Republican) 46.7%; ▌ [FNU] Odom (Prohibition) 2.1%
Maryland 5	Hart Benton Holton	Republican	1882	Incumbent lost re-election. Democratic gain.	▌ ✓ Barnes Compton (Democratic) 51.6%; ▌ Hart Benton Holton (Republican) 48.4%
Maryland 6	Louis E. McComas	Republican	1882	Incumbent re-elected.	▌ ✓ Louis E. McComas (Republican) 52.3%; ▌ Fred J. Nelson (Democratic) 47.6%

== Massachusetts ==
District	Incumbent			This race	
District	Member	Party	First elected	Results	Candidates
Massachusetts 1	Robert T. Davis	Republican	1882	Incumbent re-elected.	▌ ✓ Robert T. Davis (Republican) 66.53%; ▌Weston Howland (Democratic) 25.08%; ▌T. Dwight Stow (Democratic) 4.92%; ▌Edward H. Hatfield (Prohibition) 3.47%
Massachusetts 2	John Davis Long	Republican	1882	Incumbent re-elected.	▌ ✓ John Davis Long (Republican) 53.00%; ▌William Everett (Democratic) 34.30%; ▌Edgar E. Dean (Greenback) 9.27%; ▌George Buttrick (Prohibition) 3.43%
Massachusetts 3	Ambrose Ranney	Republican	1880	Incumbent re-elected.	▌ ✓ Ambrose Ranney (Republican) 53.00%; ▌Horatio E. Swasey (Democratic) 36.05%; ▌Eleazer B. Loring (Greenback) 9.40%; ▌John W. Field (Prohibition) 1.54%
Massachusetts 4	Patrick Collins	Democratic	1882	Incumbent re-elected.	▌ ✓ Patrick Collins (Democratic) 64.84%; ▌Joseph H. O'Neil (Republican) 34.08%; ▌John W. Sayre (Prohibition) 1.08%
Massachusetts 5	Leopold Morse	Democratic	1876	Incumbent retired. Republican gain.	▌ ✓ Edward D. Hayden (Republican) 52.01%; ▌Robert Treat Paine (Democratic) 43.11%; ▌Douglas Frazar (Greenback) 3.64%; ▌D. Gilbert Dexter (Prohibition) 1.24%
Massachusetts 6	Henry B. Lovering	Democratic	1882	Incumbent re-elected.	▌ ✓ Henry B. Lovering (Democratic) 49.57%; ▌Henry Cabot Lodge (Republican) 48.70%; ▌William F. Johnson (Prohibition) 1.73%
Massachusetts 7	Eben F. Stone	Republican	1880	Incumbent re-elected.	▌ ✓ Eben F. Stone (Republican) 47.90%; ▌Richard S. Spofford (Democratic) 36.95%; ▌John I. Baker (Greenback) 15.16%
Massachusetts 8	William A. Russell	Republican	1878	Incumbent retired. Republican hold.	▌ ✓ Charles H. Allen (Republican) 53.75%; ▌Charles S. Lilley (Democratic) 40.16%; ▌Hiram W. Eastman (Greenback) 4.49%; ▌John W. Reed (Prohibition) 1.61%
Massachusetts 9	Theodore Lyman III	Independent; Republican	1882	Incumbent lost re-election. Republican gain.	▌ ✓ Frederick D. Ely (Republican) 47.41%; ▌Henry E. Fales (Democratic) 24.35%; ▌Theodore Lyman III (Ind. Republican) 16.47%; ▌Henry E. Lemon (Greenback) 9.39%; ▌Edmund M. Stowe (Prohibition) 2.38%
Massachusetts 10	William W. Rice	Republican	1876	Incumbent re-elected.	▌ ✓ William W. Rice (Republican) 58.78%; ▌James E. Eastbrook (Democratic) 27.62%; ▌James H. Mellen (Greenback) 11.12%; ▌William H. Earle (Prohibition) 2.48%
Massachusetts 11	William Whiting II	Republican	1882	Incumbent re-elected.	▌ ✓ William Whiting II (Republican) 60.01%; ▌David Hill (Democratic) 34.04%; ▌James Oliver (Greenback) 3.21%; ▌Wilbur F. Whitney (Prohibition) 2.74%
Massachusetts 12	Francis W. Rockwell	Republican	Jan. 1884 (special)	Incumbent re-elected.	▌ ✓ Francis W. Rockwell (Republican) 51.78%; ▌Jarvis N. Dunham (Democratic) 43.20%; ▌Joseph D. Cadle (Greenback) 3.40%; ▌John Blackmer (Prohibition) 1.75%

== Michigan ==
District	Incumbent			This race	
District	Member	Party	First elected	Results	Candidates
Michigan 1	William C. Maybury	Democratic	1882	Incumbent re-elected.	▌ ✓ William C. Maybury (Democratic) 55.8%; ▌ John Atkinson (Republican) 40.0%; ▌ [FNU] Eakins (Greenback) 2.8%; ▌ [FNU] Pitkin (Prohibition) 1.4%
Michigan 2	Nathaniel B. Eldredge	Democratic	1882	Incumbent re-elected.	▌ ✓ Nathaniel B. Eldredge (Democratic/Greenback) 46.9%; ▌ Edward P. Allen (Republican) 46.7%; ▌ Charles Mosher (Prohibition) 6.4%
Michigan 3	Edward S. Lacey	Republican	1880	Incumbent retired. Republican hold.	▌ ✓ James O'Donnell (Republican) 48.5%; ▌ Henry F. Pennington (Democratic/Greenback) 45.5%; ▌ Michael J. Fanning (Prohibition) 6.0%
Michigan 4	George L. Yaple	Democratic	1882	Incumbent lost re-election. Republican gain.	▌ ✓ Julius C. Burrows (Republican) 48.8%; ▌ George L. Yaple (Democratic/Greenback) 47.9%; ▌ [FNU] Alcott (Prohibition) 3.3%
Michigan 5	Julius Houseman	Democratic	1882	Incumbent retired. Democratic hold.	▌ ✓ Charles C. Comstock (Democratic/Greenback) 47.6%; ▌ John C. Fitzgerald (Republican) 46.7%; ▌ Wilson C. Edsell (Prohibition) 5.7%
Michigan 6	Edwin B. Winans	Democratic	1882	Incumbent re-elected.	▌ ✓ Edwin B. Winans (Democratic/Greenback) 48.8%; ▌ James C. Willson (Republican) 45.2%; ▌ Leander C. Smith (Prohibition) 6.0%
Michigan 7	Ezra C. Carleton	Democratic	1882	Incumbent re-elected.	▌ ✓ Ezra C. Carleton (Democratic) 50.2%; ▌ Edgar Weeks (Republican) 42.5%; ▌ O'Brien J. Atkinson (Anti-Monopoly) 3.8%; ▌ John Russell (Prohibition) 3.5%
Michigan 8	Roswell G. Horr	Republican	1878	Incumbent lost re-election. Democratic gain.	▌ ✓ Timothy E. Tarsney (Democratic) 50.6%; ▌Roswell G. Horr (Republican) 46.4%; ▌ [FNU] Merritt (Prohibition) 2.6%; ▌ [FNU] Colvin (Greenback) 0.4%
Michigan 9	Byron M. Cutcheon	Republican	1882	Incumbent re-elected.	▌ ✓ Byron M. Cutcheon (Republican) 51.4%; ▌ Silas S. Fallas (Democratic/Greenback) 44.0%; ▌ Henry P. Blake (Prohibition) 4.6%
Michigan 10	Herschel H. Hatch	Republican	1882	Incumbent retired. Democratic gain.	▌ ✓ Spencer O. Fisher (Democratic/Greenback) 52.4%; ▌ Charles F. Gibson (Republican) 44.6%; ▌ A. M. Webster (Prohibition) 3.0%
Michigan 11	Edward Breitung	Republican	1882	Incumbent retired. Republican hold.	▌ ✓ Seth C. Moffatt (Republican) 64.7%; ▌ John Powers (Democratic) 35.3%

== Minnesota ==
District	Incumbent			This race	
District	Member	Party	First elected	Results	Candidates
Minnesota 1	Milo White	Republican	1882	Incumbent re-elected.	▌ ✓ Milo White (Republican) 53.3%; ▌Adolph Biermann (Democratic) 44.8%; ▌C. A. Bierce (Prohibition) 4.5%
Minnesota 2	James Wakefield	Republican	1882	Incumbent re-elected.	▌ ✓ James Wakefield (Republican) 63.9%; ▌Felix A. Bohrer (Democratic) 32.7%; ▌William Copp (Prohibition) 3.3%
Minnesota 3	Horace B. Strait	Republican	1880	Incumbent re-elected.	▌ ✓ Horace B. Strait (Republican) 51.3%; ▌Ignatius L. Donnelly (Democratic) 46.9%; ▌Isaac C. Stearns (Prohibition) 1.8%
Minnesota 4	William D. Washburn	Republican	1878	Incumbent retired. Republican hold.	▌ ✓ John Gilfillan (Republican) 53.2%; ▌Orlando C. Merriman (Democratic) 45.0%; ▌John Douglas (Prohibition) 1.8%
Minnesota 5	Knute Nelson	Republican	1882	Incumbent re-elected.	▌ ✓ Knute Nelson (Republican) 65.9%; ▌Luther Loren Baxter (Democratic) 33.9%

== Mississippi ==
District	Incumbent			This race	
District	Member	Party	First elected	Results	Candidates
Mississippi 1	Henry L. Muldrow	Democratic	1876	Incumbent retired to become First Assistant Secretary of the Interior. Democratic hold.	▌ ✓ John M. Allen (Democratic) 81.70%; ▌Green C. Chandler (Republican) 18.30%
Mississippi 2	James R. Chalmers	Independent	1882 (Note: Initial victor was Van. H. Manning, but election was overturned in 1884.)	Incumbent lost re-election as a Republican. Democratic gain.	▌ ✓ James B. Morgan (Democratic) 57.51%; ▌James R. Chalmers (Republican/Greenback) 41.22%; ▌Daniel Johnson (Independent Republican) 1.27%
Mississippi 3	Elza Jeffords	Republican	1882	Incumbent retired. Democratic gain.	▌ ✓ Thomas C. Catchings (Democratic) 69.55%; ▌A. G. Pearce (Republican) 30.45%
Mississippi 4	Hernando Money	Democratic	1874	Incumbent retired. Democratic hold.	▌ ✓ Frederick G. Barry (Democratic) 69.76%; ▌W. D. Frazee (Republican) 30.24%
Mississippi 5	Otho R. Singleton	Democratic	1874	Incumbent re-elected.	▌ ✓ Otho R. Singleton (Democratic) 76.51%; ▌J. Q. Smith (Republican) 23.50%
Mississippi 6	Henry S. Van Eaton	Democratic	1882	Incumbent re-elected.	▌ ✓ Henry S. Van Eaton (Democratic) 60.80%; ▌John R. Lynch (Republican) 39.20%
Mississippi 7	Ethelbert Barksdale	Democratic	1882	Incumbent re-elected.	▌ ✓ Ethelbert Barksdale (Democratic) 66.62%; ▌T. B. Yellowley (Republican) 33.30%

== Missouri ==
District	Incumbent			This race	
District	Member	Party	First elected	Results	Candidates
Missouri 1	William H. Hatch	Democratic	1878	Incumbent re-elected.	▌ ✓ William H. Hatch (Democratic) 54.3%; ▌ A. L. Gray (Republican/Greenback) 45.7%
Missouri 2	Armstead M. Alexander	Democratic	1882	Incumbent lost renomination. Democratic hold.	▌ ✓ John B. Hale (Democratic) 56.2%; ▌ W. N. Norville (Republican/Greenback) 43.8%
Missouri 3	Alexander M. Dockery	Democratic	1882	Incumbent re-elected.	▌ ✓ Alexander M. Dockery (Democratic) 53.4%; ▌ Joseph T. Harwood (Republican) 44.2%; ▌ John F. Jordan (Greenback) 2.4%
Missouri 4	James N. Burnes	Democratic	1882	Incumbent re-elected.	▌ ✓ James N. Burnes (Democratic) 55.5%; ▌ Henry S. Kelly (Republican/Greenback) 44.5%
Missouri 5	Alexander Graves	Democratic	1882	Incumbent lost re-election. Republican gain.	▌ ✓ William Warner (Republican/Greenback) 52.5%; ▌ Alexander Graves (Democratic) 47.5%
Missouri 6	John Cosgrove	Democratic	1882	Incumbent retired. Democratic hold.	▌ ✓ John T. Heard (Democratic) 56.7%; ▌ William S. Shirk (Republican/Greenback) 43.3%
Missouri 7	Aylett H. Buckner	Democratic	1872	Incumbent retired. Democratic hold.	▌ ✓ John E. Hutton (Democratic) 52.8%; ▌ G. Reynolds (Republican/Greenback) 47.2%
Missouri 8	John J. O'Neill	Democratic	1882	Incumbent re-elected.	▌ ✓ John J. O'Neill (Democratic) 54.7%; ▌ William N. Eccles (Republican/Greenback) 45.3%
Missouri 9	James Broadhead	Democratic	1882	Incumbent retired. Democratic hold.	▌ ✓ John Milton Glover (Democratic) 54.7%; ▌ James Henry McLean (Republican/Greenback) 45.3%
Missouri 10	Martin L. Clardy	Democratic	1878	Incumbent re-elected.	▌ ✓ Martin L. Clardy (Democratic) 52.8%; ▌ John H. Morse (Republican) 44.1%; ▌ George M. Jackson (Greenback) 3.1%
Missouri 11	Richard P. Bland	Democratic	1872	Incumbent re-elected.	▌ ✓ Richard P. Bland (Democratic) 54.3%; ▌ William Q. Dallmeyer (Republican/Greenback) 45.7%
Missouri 12	Charles H. Morgan	Democratic	1882	Incumbent lost renomination. Democratic hold.	▌ ✓ William J. Stone (Democratic) 55.3%; ▌ S. A. Worden (Republican/Greenback) 44.7%
Missouri 13	Robert W. Fyan	Democratic	1882	Incumbent lost renomination. Republican gain.	▌ ✓ William H. Wade (Republican) 50.3%; ▌ A. L. Thomas (Democratic) 45.0%; ▌ Ira S. Haseltine (Greenback) 4.7%
Missouri 14	Lowndes H. Davis	Democratic	1878	Incumbent retired. Democratic hold.	▌ ✓ William Dawson (Democratic) 61.6%; ▌ Wilson Cramer (Republican/Greenback) 38.4%

== Nebraska ==
District	Incumbent			This race	
District	Member	Party	First elected	Results	Candidates
Nebraska 1	Archibald J. Weaver	Republican	1882	Incumbent re-elected.	▌ ✓ Archibald J. Weaver (Republican) 49.95%; ▌Charles H. Brown (Democratic) 47.80%; ▌E. J. O'Neil (Prohibition) 2.26%
Nebraska 2	James Laird	Republican	1882	Incumbent re-elected.	▌ ✓ James Laird (Republican) 52.94%; ▌J. H. Stickel (Democratic) 44.12%; ▌B. Crabb (Prohibition) 2.94%
Nebraska 3	Edward K. Valentine	Republican	1878	Incumbent retired. Republican hold.	▌ ✓ George W. E. Dorsey (Republican) 55.02%; ▌William Neville (Democratic) 43.77%; ▌Albert Fetch (Prohibition) 1.21%

== Nevada ==
District	Incumbent			This race	
District	Member	Party	First elected	Results	Candidates
Nevada at-large	George W. Cassidy	Democratic	1880	Incumbent lost re-election. Republican gain.	▌ ✓ William Woodburn (Republican) 53.1%; ▌ George W. Cassidy (Democratic) 46.9%

== New Hampshire ==
District	Incumbent			This race	
District	Member	Party	First elected	Results	Candidates
New Hampshire 1	Martin A. Haynes	Republican	1882	Incumbent re-elected.	▌ ✓ Martin A. Haynes (Republican) 51.8%; ▌ Luther F. McKinney (Democratic) 46.2%; ▌ Charles K. Chase (Prohibition) 1.7%; ▌ John F. Woodbury (Greenback) 0.3%
New Hampshire 2	Ossian Ray	Republican	1880	Incumbent retired. Republican hold.	▌ ✓ Jacob H. Gallinger (Republican) 51.5%; ▌ John H. George (Democratic) 46.1%; ▌ Unknown Candidate (Prohibition) 1.7%

== New Jersey ==
District	Incumbent			This race	
District	Member	Party	First elected	Results	Candidates
New Jersey 1	Thomas M. Ferrell	Democratic	1882	Incumbent retired to run for governor. Republican gain.	▌ ✓ George Hires (Republican) 50.0%; ▌ Thomas M. Ferrell (Democratic) 45.6%; ▌ [FNU] Harbison (Prohibition) 3.4%; ▌ [FNU] Atkinson (Greenback) 1.0%
New Jersey 2	J. Hart Brewer	Republican	1880	Incumbent retired. Republican hold.	▌ ✓ James Buchanan (Republican) 51.5%; ▌ Chauncey H. Beasley (Democratic) 45.4%; ▌ Henry B. Howell (Prohibition) 2.4%; ▌ Samuel A. Dobbins (Greenback) 0.7%
New Jersey 3	John Kean	Republican	1882	Incumbent lost re-election. Democratic gain.	▌ ✓ Robert S. Green (Democratic) 50.8%; ▌ John Kean (Republican) 46.0%; ▌ Cortlandt Parker (Prohibition) 1.6%; ▌ [FNU] Stout (Greenback) 1.6%
New Jersey 4	Benjamin Franklin Howey	Republican	1882	Incumbent lost re-election. Democratic gain.	▌ ✓ James N. Pidcock (Democratic) 51.3%; ▌ Benjamin Franklin Howey (Republican) 43.7%; ▌ William H. Morrow (Prohibition) 4.1%; ▌ [FNU] Davis (Greenback) 0.9%
New Jersey 5	William Walter Phelps	Republican	1882	Incumbent re-elected.	▌ ✓ William Walter Phelps (Republican) 51.7%; ▌ [FNU] Stevenson (Democratic) 45.0%; ▌ [FNU] Buckley (Prohibition) 1.9%; ▌ [FNU] Potter (Greenback) 1.4%
New Jersey 6	William H. F. Fiedler	Democratic	1882	Incumbent lost re-election. Republican gain.	▌ ✓ Herman Lehlbach (Republican) 49.4%; ▌ William H. F. Fiedler (Democratic) 48.6%; ▌ S. E. Tompkins (Prohibition) 2.0%
New Jersey 7	William McAdoo	Democratic	1882	Incumbent re-elected.	▌ ✓ William McAdoo (Democratic) 56.7%; ▌ Lewis A. Brigham (Republican) 43.0%; ▌ [FNU] Lee (Prohibition) 0.3%

== New York ==
District	Incumbent			This race	
District	Member	Party	First elected	Results	Candidates
New York 1	Perry Belmont	Democratic	1880	Incumbent re-elected,	▌ ✓ Perry Belmont (Democratic) 54.9%; ▌ James H. Platt (Republican) 45.1%
New York 2	Felix Campbell; Redistricted from the 4th district	Democratic	1882	Incumbent re-elected.	▌ ✓ Felix Campbell (Democratic) 58.5%; ▌ Thomas J. Sheridan (Republican/Greenback) 39.4%; ▌ Frank Bowman (Prohibition) 2.1%
New York 3	Darwin R. James	Republican	1882	Incumbent re-elected.	▌ ✓ Darwin R. James (Republican) 60.5%; ▌ Caleb L. Smith (Democratic) 39.5%
New York 3	Henry Warner Slocum; Redistricted from the at-large seat	Democratic	1882	Incumbent retired. Democratic loss.	▌ ✓ Darwin R. James (Republican) 60.5%; ▌ Caleb L. Smith (Democratic) 39.5%
New York 4	William Erigena Robinson; Redistricted from the 2nd district	Democratic	1880	Incumbent retired. Democratic hold.	▌ ✓ Peter P. Mahoney (Democratic) 57.8%; ▌ Bernard J. Mulholland (Republican) 40.7%; ▌ William B. Shotwell (Greenback) 1.5%
New York 5	None (new district)			New seat. Democratic gain.	▌ ✓ Archibald M. Bliss (Democratic) 50.1%; ▌ Jacob Worth (Republican) 46.1%; ▌ Walter F. Blaisdell (Greenback) 3.8%
New York 6	Nicholas Muller; Redistricted from the 5th district	Democratic	1882	Incumbent re-elected.	▌ ✓ Nicholas Muller (Democratic) 56.9%; ▌ Frederick B. House (Republican) 29.1%; ▌ James Fitzgerald (Independent Democratic ) 12.2%; ▌ Bernard Preble (Prohibition) 1.8%
New York 7	John J. Adams; Redistricted from the 8th district	Democratic	1882	Incumbent re-elected.	▌ ✓ John J. Adams (Democratic) 65.3%; ▌ Alfred R. Conkling (Republican) 33.9%
New York 8	Samuel S. Cox; Redistricted from the 6th district	Democratic	1872	Incumbent re-elected.	▌ ✓ Samuel S. Cox (Tammany Hall Democratic) 80.7%; ▌ William Hall (County Democratic) 18.7%
New York 9	William Dorsheimer; Redistricted from the 7th district	Democratic	1882	Incumbent retired to become U.S. Attorney for the Southern District of New York. Democratic hold.	▌ ✓ Joseph Pulitzer (Democratic) 63.6%; ▌ Herman W. Thum (Republican) 34.8%; ▌ William McCabe (Greenback) 1.6%
New York 10	Abram Hewitt	Democratic	1880	Incumbent re-elected.	▌ ✓ Abram Hewitt (Democratic) 64.1%; ▌ Bernard Biglin (Republican) 35.3%
New York 11	John Hardy; Redistricted from the 9th district	Democratic	1881	Incumbent lost re-election. Independent Democratic gain.	▌ ✓ Truman A. Merriman (County Democratic/Greenback) 62.4%; ▌ John Hardy (Tammany Hall Democratic) 36.8%
New York 12	None (new district)			New seat. Democratic gain.	▌ ✓ Abraham Dowdney (Democratic) 61.3%; ▌ Henry C. Perley (Republican) 37.8%
New York 13	Orlando B. Potter; Redistricted from the 11th district	Democratic	1882	Incumbent retired. Democratic hold.	▌ ✓ Egbert Ludovicus Viele (Democratic) 60.6%; ▌ Edwin B. Smith (Republican) 37.9%; ▌ Jesse H. Griffin (Prohibition) 1.5%
New York 14	Waldo Hutchins; Redistricted from the 12th district	Democratic	1878	Incumbent retired. Democratic hold.	▌ ✓ William G. Stahlnecker (Democratic) 51.9%; ▌ Edwin A. McAlpin (Republican) 46.7%; ▌ Herbert A. Lee (Prohibition) 1.4%
New York 15	Lewis Beach; Redistricted from the 14th district	Democratic	1880	Incumbent re-elected.	▌ ✓ Lewis Beach (Democratic) 51.7%; ▌ William W. Snow (Republican) 46.0%; ▌ Gideon Hall (Prohibition) 1.7%; ▌ John Law (Greenback) 0.6%
New York 16	John H. Ketcham; Redistricted from the 13th district	Republican	1876	Incumbent re-elected.	▌ ✓ John H. Ketcham (Republican) 54.1%; ▌ Robert P. Huntington (Democratic) 43.9%; ▌ George A. Fortney (Prohibition) 2.0%
New York 17	John H. Bagley Jr. Redistricted from the 15th district	Democratic	1882	Incumbent lost re-election. Republican gain.	▌ ✓ James Girard Lindsley (Republican) 50.9%; ▌ John H. Bagley Jr. (Democratic) 46.2%; ▌ Porter G. Northrup (Prohibition) 2.0%; ▌ James Tubby (Greenback) 0.9%
New York 18	Henry G. Burleigh; Redistricted from the 17th district	Republican	1882	Incumbent re-elected.	▌ ✓ Henry G. Burleigh (Republican) 88.0%; ▌ James R. McClellan (Prohibition) 11.8%
New York 19	Thomas J. Van Alstyne; Redistricted from the 16th district	Democratic	1882	Incumbent lost re-election. Republican gain.	▌ ✓ John Swinburne (Republican) 53.0%; ▌ Thomas J. Van Alstyne (Democratic) 46.3%; ▌ John C. Sanford (Prohibition) 0.7%
New York 20	Edward Wemple	Democratic	1882	Incumbent lost re-election. Republican gain.	▌ ✓ George West (Republican) 51.2%; ▌ Edward Wemple (Democratic) 47.0%; ▌ Ray Hubbell (Prohibition) 1.6%; ▌ Archibald McLaughlin (Greenback) 0.2%
New York 21	Frederick A. Johnson; Redistricted from the 18th district	Republican	1882	Incumbent re-elected.	▌ ✓ Frederick A. Johnson (Republican) 58.6%; ▌ Apollos A. Smith (Democratic) 41.4%
New York 22	Abraham X. Parker; Redistricted from the 19th district	Republican	1880	Incumbent re-elected.	▌ ✓ Abraham X. Parker (Republican) 62.1%; ▌ George Hall (Democratic) 35.6%; ▌ Gates Curtis (Prohibition) 2.3%
New York 22	Charles R. Skinner	Republican	1881	Incumbent retired. Republican loss.	▌ ✓ Abraham X. Parker (Republican) 62.1%; ▌ George Hall (Democratic) 35.6%; ▌ Gates Curtis (Prohibition) 2.3%
New York 23	John T. Spriggs	Democratic	1882	Incumbent re-elected.	▌ ✓ John T. Spriggs (Democratic) 49.9%; ▌ Henry J. Cookinham (Republican) 47.6%; ▌ Leander Fisk (Prohibition) 2.5%
New York 24	None (new district)			New seat. Democratic gain.	▌ ✓ John S. Pindar (Democratic) 50.5%; ▌ Joseph H. Ramsey (Republican) 47.4%; ▌ Robert G. Fenton (Prohibition) 2.1%
New York 25	Frank Hiscock	Republican	1876	Incumbent re-elected.	▌ ✓ Frank Hiscock (Republican) 56.4%; ▌ William Porter (Democratic) 40.9%; ▌ Wilfred W. Porter (Prohibition) 2.6%
New York 26	Stephen C. Millard; Redistricted from the 28th district	Republican	1882	Incumbent re-elected.	▌ ✓ Stephen C. Millard (Republican) 53.9%; ▌ Charles E. Remick (Democratic) 42.6%; ▌ Joseph W. Bruce (Prohibition) 3.5%
New York 26	George W. Ray; Redistricted from the 21st district	Republican	1882	Incumbent retired. Republican loss.	▌ ✓ Stephen C. Millard (Republican) 53.9%; ▌ Charles E. Remick (Democratic) 42.6%; ▌ Joseph W. Bruce (Prohibition) 3.5%
New York 27	Sereno E. Payne; Redistricted from the 26th district	Republican	1882	Incumbent re-elected.	▌ ✓ Sereno E. Payne (Republican) 57.1%; ▌ William C. Beardsley (Democratic) 38.4%; ▌ Orzo M. Bond (Prohibition) 2.9%; ▌ David H. Foster (Greenback) 1.6%
New York 27	Newton W. Nutting; Redistricted from the 24th district	Republican	1882	Incumbent retired. Republican loss.	▌ ✓ Sereno E. Payne (Republican) 57.1%; ▌ William C. Beardsley (Democratic) 38.4%; ▌ Orzo M. Bond (Prohibition) 2.9%; ▌ David H. Foster (Greenback) 1.6%
New York 28	John Arnot Jr. Redistricted from the 29th district	Democratic	1882	Incumbent re-elected.	▌ ✓ John Arnot Jr. (Democratic) 91.0%; ▌ Thomas K. Beecher (Greenback) 6.6%; ▌ Benjamin N. Payne (Prohibition) 2.4%
New York 29	None (new district)			New seat. Republican gain.	▌ ✓ Ira Davenport (Republican) 52.5%; ▌ David A. Pierpont (Democratic) 43.0%; ▌ Oscar Ingolsby (Prohibition) 3.4%; ▌ Robert C. Hewson (Greenback) 1.1%
New York 30	Halbert S. Greenleaf	Democratic	1882	Incumbent lost re-election. Republican gain.	▌ ✓ Charles S. Baker (Republican) 50.2%; ▌ Halbert S. Greenleaf (Democratic) 46.5%; ▌ Devalson G. Weaver (Prohibition) 3.3%
New York 31	James W. Wadsworth; Redistricted from the 27th district	Republican	1881	Incumbent retired to run for New York State Comptroller. Republican hold.	▌ ✓ John G. Sawyer (Republican) 51.4%; ▌ Robert S. Stevens (Democratic) 42.4%; ▌ Charles H. Richmond (Prohibition) 5.5%
New York 31	Robert S. Stevens	Democratic	1882	Incumbent lost re-election. Democratic Loss.	▌ ✓ John G. Sawyer (Republican) 51.4%; ▌ Robert S. Stevens (Democratic) 42.4%; ▌ Charles H. Richmond (Prohibition) 5.5%
New York 32	William Findlay Rogers	Democratic	1882	Incumbent retired. Republican gain.	▌ ✓ John McCreath Farquhar (Republican) 50.0%; ▌ Daniel N. Lockwood (Democratic) 49.5%; ▌ David L. Waters (Prohibition) 0.5%
New York 33	None (new district)			New seat. Republican gain.	▌ ✓ John B. Weber (Republican) 49.1%; ▌ Lewis S. Payne (Democratic) 47.2%; ▌ Edward Evans (Prohibition) 3.5%; ▌ Bement Bennett (Greenback) 0.2%
New York 34	Francis B. Brewer; Redistricted from the 33rd district	Republican	1882	Incumbent retired. Republican hold.	▌ ✓ Walter L. Sessions (Republican) 54.7%; ▌ Hiram Smith (Democratic) 35.3%; ▌ Daniel B. Sill (Prohibition) 5.7%; ▌ Joe I. Heoyh (Greenback) 4.3%

== North Carolina ==
District	Incumbent			This race	
District	Member	Party	First elected	Results	Candidates
North Carolina 1	Thomas Gregory Skinner	Democratic	1883	Incumbent re-elected.	▌ ✓ Thomas Gregory Skinner (Democratic) 53.8%; ▌ John Bunyan Respess (Republican) 46.3%
North Carolina 2	James E. O'Hara	Republican	1882	Incumbent re-elected.	▌ ✓ James E. O'Hara (Republican) 58.7%; ▌ Frederick A. Woodward (Democratic) 41.3%
North Carolina 3	Wharton J. Green	Democratic	1882	Incumbent re-elected.	▌ ✓ Wharton J. Green (Democratic) 57.8%; ▌ Curtis Hooks Brogden (Republican) 41.9%
North Carolina 4	William Ruffin Cox	Democratic	1880	Incumbent re-elected.	▌ ✓ William Ruffin Cox (Democratic) 58.5%; ▌ Josiah Turner (Republican) 41.5%
North Carolina 5	Alfred Moore Scales	Democratic	1874	Incumbent re-elected.	▌ ✓ Alfred Moore Scales (Democratic) 54.6%; ▌ Leonidas C. Edwards (Republican) 45.4%
North Carolina 6	Risden Tyler Bennett; Redistricted from the at-large seat	Democratic	1882	Incumbent re-elected.	▌ ✓ Risden Tyler Bennett (Democratic) 58.0%; ▌ Oliver H. Dockery (Republican) 42.0%
North Carolina 6	Clement Dowd	Democratic	1880	Incumbent retired. Democratic loss.	▌ ✓ Risden Tyler Bennett (Democratic) 58.0%; ▌ Oliver H. Dockery (Republican) 42.0%
North Carolina 7	New district			New seat. Democratic gain.	▌ ✓ John S. Henderson (Democratic) 56.8%; ▌ James Graham Ramsay (Republican) 43.2%
North Carolina 8	Tyre York; Redistricted from the 7th district	Independent Democratic	1882	Incumbent retired. Democratic gain.	▌ ✓ William H. H. Cowles (Democratic) 58.7%; ▌ Leander L. Green (Republican) 41.3%
North Carolina 9	Robert B. Vance; Redistricted from the 8th district	Democratic	1872	Incumbent retired. Democratic hold.	▌ ✓ Thomas D. Johnston (Democratic) 53.2%; ▌ Hamilton G. Ewart (Republican) 46.8%

== Ohio ==
District	Incumbent			This race	
District	Member	Party	First elected	Results	Candidates
Ohio 1	John F. Follett	Democratic	1882	Incumbent lost re-election. Republican gain.	▌ ✓ Benjamin Butterworth (Republican) 52.1%; ▌ John F. Follett (Democratic) 47.4%; ▌ [FNU] Chichester (Greenback) 0.3%; ▌ [FNU] Martin (Prohibition) 0.2%
Ohio 2	Isaac M. Jordan	Democratic	1882	Incumbent retired. Republican gain.	▌ ✓ Charles Elwood Brown (Republican) 52.8%; ▌ Adam A. Kramer (Democratic) 46.9%; ▌ W. J. Kronague (Greenback) 0.2%; ▌ Henry T. Ogden (Prohibition) 0.1%
Ohio 3	James E. Campbell; Redistricted from the 7th district	Democratic	1882	Incumbent re-elected.	▌ ✓ James E. Campbell (Democratic) 50.3%; ▌ Henry Lee Morey (Republican) 49.0%; ▌ [FNU] Keister (Prohibition) 0.5%; ▌ [FNU] Coobly (Greenback) 0.2%
Ohio 4	Robert Maynard Murray; Redistricted from the 3rd district	Democratic	1882	Incumbent lost renomination. Democratic hold.	▌ ✓ Charles Marley Anderson (Democratic) 50.0%; ▌ John F. Sinks (Republican) 49.3%; ▌ [FNU] Legg (Prohibition) 0.5%; ▌ [FNU] Polley (Greenback) 0.2%
Ohio 5	Benjamin Le Fevre; Redistricted from the 4th district	Democratic	1878	Incumbent re-elected.	▌ ✓ Benjamin Le Fevre (Democratic) 56.3%; ▌ William D. Davis (Republican) 43.2%; ▌ [FNU] Watson (Prohibition) 0.5%
Ohio 5	James S. Robinson; Redistricted from the 9th district	Republican	1880	Incumbent resigned to become Ohio Secretary of State. Republican loss.	▌ ✓ Benjamin Le Fevre (Democratic) 56.3%; ▌ William D. Davis (Republican) 43.2%; ▌ [FNU] Watson (Prohibition) 0.5%
Ohio 6	William D. Hill	Democratic	1882	Incumbent re-elected.	▌ ✓ William D. Hill (Democratic) 54.1%; ▌ Hiram C. Glenn (Republican) 44.9%; ▌ [FNU] Crary (Prohibition) 0.8%; ▌ [FNU] Hayes (Greenback) 0.2%
Ohio 7	George E. Seney; Redistricted from the 5th district	Democratic	1882	Incumbent re-elected.	▌ ✓ George E. Seney (Democratic) 54.5%; ▌ Daniel Babst Jr. (Republican) 43.9%; ▌ [FNU] Nestlerode (Prohibition) 1.2%; ▌ [FNU] Vail (Greenback) 0.4%
Ohio 8	J. Warren Keifer	Republican	1876	Incumbent retired. Republican hold.	▌ ✓ John Little (Republican) 58.5%; ▌ James W. Denver (Democratic) 39.1%; ▌ W. Colvin (Prohibition) 2.2%; ▌ George Hempleman (Greenback) 0.2%
Ohio 9	None (new district)			New seat. Republican gain.	▌ ✓ William C. Cooper (Republican) 51.1%; ▌ E. F. Poppieton (Democratic) 46.2%; ▌ J. W. Sharp (Prohibition) 2.5%; ▌ L. Graham (Greenback) 0.2%
Ohio 10	Frank H. Hurd	Democratic	1882	Incumbent lost re-election. Republican gain.	▌ ✓ Jacob Romeis (Republican) 50.0%; ▌ Frank H. Hurd (Democratic) 49.4%; ▌ [FNU] Rawle (Prohibition) 0.6%
Ohio 11	Alphonso Hart; Redistricted from the 12th district	Republican	1882	Incumbent lost re-election. Democratic gain.	▌ ✓ William W. Ellsberry (Democratic) 50.7%; ▌ Alphonso Hart (Republican) 49.3%
Ohio 12	None (new district)			New seat. Republican gain.	▌ ✓ Albert C. Thompson (Republican) 53.8%; ▌ Leo Ebert (Democratic) 45.7%; ▌ [FNU] Collins (Prohibition) 0.4%; ▌ [FNU] Dodge (Greenback) 0.1%
Ohio 13	George L. Converse	Democratic	1878	Incumbent retired. Democratic hold.	▌ ✓ Joseph H. Outhwaite (Democratic) 55.2%; ▌ Allen Miller (Republican) 43.8%; ▌ J. B. Williams (Greenback) 0.5%; ▌ W. A. Dobyns (Prohibition) 0.5%
Ohio 14	John W. McCormick; Redistricted from the 11th district	Republican	1882	Incumbent lost renomination. Republican hold.	▌ ✓ Charles H. Grosvenor (Republican) 56.0%; ▌ John L. Vance (Democratic) 37.2%; ▌ Christopher Evans (Greenback) 5.6%; ▌ Thomas Peden (Prohibition) 1.2%
Ohio 15	Beriah Wilkins; Redistricted from the 16th district	Democratic	1882	Incumbent re-elected.	▌ ✓ Beriah Wilkins (Democratic) 54.1%; ▌ Elijah Little (Republican) 45.5%; ▌ [FNU] Shyrock (Prohibition) 0.4%
Ohio 16	George W. Geddes; Redistricted from the 14th district	Democratic	1878	Incumbent re-elected.	▌ ✓ George W. Geddes (Democratic) 50.0%; ▌ Henry C. Hedges (Republican) 48.2%; ▌ [FNU] Noel (Prohibition) 1.8%
Ohio 17	Adoniram J. Warner; Redistricted from the 15th district	Democratic	1882	Incumbent re-elected.	▌ ✓ Adoniram J. Warner (Democratic) 49.9%; ▌ Joseph D. Taylor (Republican) 49.3%; ▌ [FNU] McElhany (Prohibition) 0.6%; ▌ [FNU] Sigman (Greenback) 0.2%
Ohio 17	Joseph D. Taylor	Republican	1883	Incumbent lost re-election. Republican loss.	▌ ✓ Adoniram J. Warner (Democratic) 49.9%; ▌ Joseph D. Taylor (Republican) 49.3%; ▌ [FNU] McElhany (Prohibition) 0.6%; ▌ [FNU] Sigman (Greenback) 0.2%
Ohio 18	Jonathan H. Wallace	Democratic	1882	Incumbent lost re-election. Republican gain.	▌ ✓ Isaac H. Taylor (Republican) 56.3%; ▌ Jonathan H. Wallace (Democratic) 40.9%; ▌ C. Jenkins (Greenback) 2.5%; ▌ A. R. Silver (Prohibition) 0.3%
Ohio 19	Ezra B. Taylor	Republican	1880	Incumbent re-elected.	▌ ✓ Ezra B. Taylor (Republican) 65.0%; ▌ Horace Alvord (Democratic) 31.4%; ▌ [FNU] Odell (Prohibition) 2.5%; ▌ [FNU] Brooks (Greenback) 1.1%
Ohio 20	David R. Paige	Democratic	1882	Incumbent lost re-election. Republican gain.	▌ ✓ William McKinley (Republican) 51.6%; ▌ David R. Paige (Democratic) 47.0%; ▌ Thomas Rhodes (Prohibition) 0.9%; ▌ H. P. Smith (Greenback) 0.5%
Ohio 21	Martin A. Foran	Democratic	1882	Incumbent re-elected.	▌ ✓ Martin A. Foran (Democratic/Greenback) 51.4%; ▌ Charles C. Burnett (Republican) 48.0%; ▌ A. Teachout (Prohibition) 0.6%

== Oregon ==
District	Incumbent			This race	
District	Member	Party	First elected	Results	Candidates
Oregon at-large	Melvin Clark George	Republican	1880	Incumbent retired. Republican hold.	▌ ✓ Binger Hermann (Republican) 52.1%; ▌ John Myers (Democratic) 47.9%

== Pennsylvania ==
District	Incumbent			This race	
District	Member	Party	First elected	Results	Candidates
Pennsylvania 1	Henry H. Bingham	Republican	1878	Incumbent re-elected.	▌ ✓ Henry H. Bingham (Republican) 60.1%; ▌ Charles H. Tipton (Democratic) 39.9%
Pennsylvania 2	Charles O'Neill	Republican	1872	Incumbent re-elected.	▌ ✓ Charles O'Neill (Republican) 60.5%; ▌ B. F. Dotts (Democratic) 39.5%
Pennsylvania 3	Samuel J. Randall	Democratic	1862	Incumbent re-elected.	▌ ✓ Samuel J. Randall (Democratic) 57.7%; ▌ Jacob J. Gumper (Republican) 42.3%
Pennsylvania 4	William D. Kelley	Republican	1860	Incumbent re-elected.	▌ ✓ William D. Kelley (Republican) 63.3%; ▌ Michael J. Fahey (Democratic) 36.5%; ▌ E. M. Lester (Greenback) 0.2%
Pennsylvania 5	Alfred C. Harmer	Republican	1876	Incumbent re-elected.	▌ ✓ Alfred C. Harmer (Republican) 99.9%
Pennsylvania 6	James B. Everhart	Republican	1882	Incumbent re-elected.	▌ ✓ James B. Everhart (Republican) 60.5%; ▌ Frederick W. Heckel (Democratic) 37.6%; ▌ George B. Passmore (Prohibition) 2.0%
Pennsylvania 7	Isaac Newton Evans	Republican	1882	Incumbent re-elected.	▌ ✓ Isaac Newton Evans (Republican) 52.4%; ▌ George Ross (Democratic) 47.7%
Pennsylvania 8	Daniel Ermentrout	Democratic	1880	Incumbent re-elected.	▌ ✓ Daniel Ermentrout (Democratic) 63.8%; ▌ Louis Richards (Republican) 36.2%
Pennsylvania 9	A. Herr Smith	Republican	1872	Incumbent lost renomination. Republican hold.	▌ ✓ John A. Hiestand (Republican) 65.6%; ▌ Paris Haldeman (Democratic) 33.0%; ▌ Barr Spangler (Prohibition) 1.4%
Pennsylvania 10	William Mutchler	Democratic	1880	Incumbent retired. Democratic hold.	▌ ✓ William H. Sowden (Democratic) 59.2%; ▌ Charles F. Chidsey (Republican) 40.8%
Pennsylvania 11	John B. Storm	Democratic	1882	Incumbent re-elected.	▌ ✓ John B. Storm (Democratic) 60.4%; ▌ T. Frank Walter (Republican) 39.3%; ▌ James B. Robinson (Prohibition) 0.4%
Pennsylvania 12	Daniel W. Connolly	Democratic	1882	Incumbent lost re-election. Republican gain.	▌ ✓ Joseph A. Scranton (Republican) 51.3%; ▌ Daniel W. Connolly (Democratic) 45.7%; ▌ E. D. Nichols (Prohibition) 3.0%
Pennsylvania 13	Charles N. Brumm	Greenback	1880	Incumbent re-elected as a Republican candidate. Republican gain.	▌ ✓ Charles N. Brumm (Republican/Greenback) 52.4%; ▌ James B. Reilly (Democratic) 47.6%
Pennsylvania 14	Samuel Fleming Barr	Republican	1880	Incumbent retired. Republican hold.	▌ ✓ Franklin Bound (Republican) 57.7%; ▌ William Foster (Democratic) 42.4%
Pennsylvania 15	George Adams Post	Democratic	1882	Incumbent lost re-election. Republican gain.	▌ ✓ Frank C. Bunnell (Republican) 54.4%; ▌ George Adams Post (Democratic) 40.6%; ▌ Richard T. Dodson (Prohibition) 4.1%; ▌ C. Decker (Labor Reform) 1.0%
Pennsylvania 16	William Wallace Brown	Republican	1882	Incumbent re-elected.	▌ ✓ William Wallace Brown (Republican) 53.3%; ▌ William C. Kennedy (Democratic/Greenback) 45.2%; ▌ John Brown (Prohibition) 1.5%
Pennsylvania 17	Jacob M. Campbell	Republican	1880	Incumbent re-elected.	▌ ✓ Jacob M. Campbell (Republican) 54.3%; ▌ Americus Enfield (Democratic) 44.4%; ▌ Samuel Isett (Prohibition) 1.0%; ▌ Matthew Calvin (Greenback) 0.4%
Pennsylvania 18	Louis E. Atkinson	Republican	1882	Incumbent re-elected.	▌ ✓ Louis E. Atkinson (Republican) 54.6%; ▌ Alfred J. Patterson (Democratic) 45.4%
Pennsylvania 19	William Addison Duncan	Democratic	1882	Incumbent re-elected but died before start of term.	▌ ✓ William Addison Duncan (Democratic) 55.9%; ▌ Benjamin F. Seitz (Republican) 44.2%
Pennsylvania 20	Andrew Gregg Curtin	Democratic	1880	Incumbent re-elected.	▌ ✓ Andrew Gregg Curtin (Democratic) 51.4%; ▌ John Patton (Republican) 47.8%; ▌ James K. Hall (Independent Democratic) 0.4%; ▌ Theodore P. Rynder (Greenback) 0.4%
Pennsylvania 21	Charles Edmund Boyle	Democratic	1882	Incumbent re-elected,	▌ ✓ Charles Edmund Boyle (Democratic) 52.8%; ▌ Joseph W. Ray (Republican) 46.0%; ▌ Ewing B. Porter (Prohibition) 0.8%; ▌ J. B. Gill (Independent) 0.4%
Pennsylvania 22	James Herron Hopkins	Democratic	1882	Incumbent lost re-election. Republican gain.	▌ ✓ James S. Negley (Republican) 56.7%; ▌ James Herron Hopkins (Democratic) 42.5%; ▌ J. T. Riley (Prohibition) 0.8%
Pennsylvania 23	Thomas M. Bayne	Republican	1876	Incumbent re-elected.	▌ ✓ Thomas M. Bayne (Republican) 64.9%; ▌ Morrison Foster (Democratic) 33.0%; ▌ W. T. Dunn (Prohibition) 2.1%
Pennsylvania 24	George V. Lawrence	Republican	1882	Incumbent retired. Republican hold.	▌ ✓ Oscar L. Jackson (Republican) 57.0%; ▌ John M. Stockdale (Democratic) 40.0%; ▌ John Gourley (Prohibition) 1.8%; ▌ John W. Covert (Greenback) 1.2%
Pennsylvania 25	John Denniston Patton	Democratic	1882	Incumbent retired. Republican gain.	▌ ✓ Alexander Colwell White (Republican) 52.8%; ▌ Daniel Reitz (Democratic/Greenback) 47.2%
Pennsylvania 26	Samuel H. Miller	Republican	1880	Incumbent declined renomination. Republican hold.	▌ ✓ George Washington Fleeger (Republican) 47.0%; ▌ John L. McKinney (Democratic) 42.6%; ▌ Walter B. Roberts (Ind. Republican/Greenback) 7.4%; ▌ John M. Wilson (Prohibition) 3.0%
Pennsylvania 27	Samuel Myron Brainerd	Republican	1882	Incumbent lost renomination. Democratic gain.	▌ ✓ William Lawrence Scott (Democratic) 49.2%; ▌ Charles W. Mackey (Republican) 47.1%; ▌ J. R. Borland (Prohibition) 3.7%
Pennsylvania at-large	Mortimer Fitzland Elliott	Democratic	1882	Incumbent lost renomination. Republican gain.	▌ ✓ Edwin S. Osborne (Republican) 53.2%; ▌ W. H. Davis (Democratic) 44.6%; ▌ James Black (Prohibition) 1.2%; ▌ Nathan L. Atwood (Greenback) 1.1%

== Rhode Island ==
District	Incumbent			This race	
District	Member	Party	First elected	Results	Candidates
Rhode Island 1	Henry J. Spooner	Republican	1881	Incumbent re-elected.	▌ ✓ Henry J. Spooner (Republican) 60.0%; ▌ Tiba O. Slocum (Democratic) 35.4%; ▌ William P. Buffum (Prohibition) 3.2%; ▌ Daniel Bruce Jr. (Greenback) 1.2%
Rhode Island 2	Jonathan Chace	Republican	1880	Incumbent retired to run for U.S. senator and resigned when elected. Republican hold.	▌ ✓ William A. Pirce (Republican) 50.1%; ▌ Charles H. Page (Democratic) 38.7%; ▌ Alfred B. Chadsey (Prohibition) 9.7%; ▌ Nathan F. Dixon III (Republican) 0.7%; ▌ William M. Longstreet (Greenback) 0.5%

== South Carolina ==
District	Incumbent			This race	
District	Member	Party	First elected	Results	Candidates
South Carolina 1	Samuel Dibble	Democratic	1882	Incumbent re-elected.	▌ ✓ Samuel Dibble (Democratic) 73.5%; ▌W. N. Taft (Republican) 26.5%
South Carolina 2	George D. Tillman	Democratic	1878	Incumbent re-elected.	▌ ✓ George D. Tillman (Democratic) 84.4%; ▌E. J. Dickerson (Republican) 14.2%; Others 1.4%
South Carolina 3	D. Wyatt Aiken	Democratic	1876	Incumbent re-elected.	▌ ✓ D. Wyatt Aiken (Democratic) 93.5%; ▌John R. Tolbert (Republican) 6.5%
South Carolina 4	John H. Evins	Democratic	1876	Incumbent died October 20, 1884. Democratic hold. Winner was not elected to finish the current term.	▌ ✓ William H. Perry (Democratic) 99.4%; Others 0.6%
South Carolina 5	John J. Hemphill	Democratic	1882	Incumbent re-elected.	▌ ✓ John J. Hemphill (Democratic) 74.5%; ▌C. C. Macoy (Republican) 21.8%; Others 3.7%
South Carolina 6	George W. Dargan	Democratic	1882	Incumbent re-elected.	▌ ✓ George W. Dargan (Democratic) 74.0%; ▌Edmund H. Deas (Republican) 23.3%; Others 2.7%
South Carolina 7	Robert Smalls	Republican	1884 (special)	Incumbent re-elected.	▌ ✓ Robert Smalls (Republican) 63.6%; ▌William Elliott (Democratic) 34.6%; Others 1.8%

== Tennessee ==
District	Incumbent			This race	
District	Member	Party	First elected	Results	Candidates
Tennessee 1	A. H. Pettibone	Republican	1880	Incumbent re-elected.	▌ ✓ A. H. Pettibone (Republican) 54.40%; ▌O. C. King (Democratic) 45.60%
Tennessee 2	Leonidas C. Houk	Republican	1878	Incumbent re-elected.	▌ ✓ Leonidas C. Houk (Republican) 68.32%; ▌W. L. Ledgerwood (Democratic) 31.68%
Tennessee 3	George G. Dibrell	Democratic	1874	Incumbent retired. Democratic hold.	▌ ✓ John R. Neal (Democratic) 50.12%; ▌H. Clay Evans (Republican) 49.88%
Tennessee 4	Benton McMillin	Democratic	1878	Incumbent re-elected.	▌ ✓ Benton McMillin (Democratic) 83.26%; ▌Walton Smith (Republican) 16.74%
Tennessee 5	Richard Warner	Democratic	1880	Incumbent lost renomination. Democratic hold.	▌ ✓ James D. Richardson (Democratic) 58.46%; ▌James A. Warder (Republican) 31.43%; ▌Matt Martin (Ind. Democratic) 8.28%; ▌J. R. Beasley (Ind. Greenback) 1.83%
Tennessee 6	Andrew J. Caldwell	Democratic	1882	Incumbent re-elected.	▌ ✓ Andrew J. Caldwell (Democratic) 58.19%; ▌J. W. Baker (Republican) 34.26%
Tennessee 7	John G. Ballentine	Democratic	1882	Incumbent re-elected.	▌ ✓ John G. Ballentine (Democratic) 55.66%; ▌D. B. Cliff (Republican) 44.34%
Tennessee 8	John M. Taylor	Democratic	1882	Incumbent re-elected.	▌ ✓ John M. Taylor (Democratic) 52.58%; ▌James T. Warren (Republican) 47.43%
Tennessee 9	Rice A. Pierce	Democratic	1882	Incumbent lost renomination. Democratic hold.	▌ ✓ Presley T. Glass (Democratic) 55.02%; ▌Emerson Etheridge (Republican) 44.98%
Tennessee 10	H. Casey Young	Democratic	1882	Incumbent retired. Republican gain.	▌ ✓ Zachary Taylor (Republican) 51.00%; ▌James M. Harris (Democratic) 46.99%

== Texas ==
District	Incumbent			This race	
District	Member	Party	First elected	Results	Candidates
Texas 1	Charles Stewart	Democratic	1882	Incumbent re-elected.	▌ ✓ Charles Stewart (Democratic) 99.9%
Texas 2	John H. Reagan	Democratic	1874	Incumbent re-elected.	▌ ✓ John H. Reagan (Democratic) 67.1%; ▌ A. T. Monroe (Republican) 33.0%
Texas 3	James H. Jones	Democratic	1882	Incumbent re-elected.	▌ ✓ James H. Jones (Democratic) 97.2%; ▌ G. F. Conley (Republican) 2.2%
Texas 4	David B. Culberson	Democratic	1874	Incumbent re-elected.	▌ ✓ David B. Culberson (Democratic) 100.0%
Texas 5	James W. Throckmorton	Democratic	1882	Incumbent re-elected.	▌ ✓ James W. Throckmorton (Democratic) 98.9%
Texas 6	Olin Wellborn	Democratic	1878	Incumbent re-elected.	▌ ✓ Olin Wellborn (Democratic) 85.5%; ▌ J. C. Bigger (Republican) 14.5%
Texas 7	Thomas P. Ochiltree	Independent	1882	Incumbent retired. Democratic gain.	▌ ✓ William H. Crain (Democratic) 59.2%; ▌ Robert B. Rentfro (Republican) 36.7%; ▌ Richard Nelson (Colored Republican) 4.2%
Texas 8	James Francis Miller	Democratic	1882	Incumbent re-elected.	▌ ✓ James Francis Miller (Democratic) 66.9%; ▌ Waller T. Burns (Republican) 33.1%
Texas 9	Roger Q. Mills	Democratic	1872	Incumbent re-elected.	▌ ✓ Roger Q. Mills (Democratic) 71.2%; ▌ John P. Osterhout (Republican) 28.8%
Texas 10	John Hancock	Democratic	1882	Incumbent retired. Democratic hold.	▌ ✓ Joseph D. Sayers (Democratic) 63.7%; ▌ John B. Rector (Republican) 36.3%
Texas 11	S. W. T. Lanham	Democratic	1882	Incumbent re-elected.	▌ ✓ S. W. T. Lanham (Democratic) 99.4%; ▌ W. A. Saylor (Republican) 0.6%

== Vermont ==
District	Incumbent			This race	
District	Member	Party	First elected	Results	Candidates
Vermont 1	John W. Stewart	Republican	1882	Incumbent re-elected.	▌ ✓ John W. Stewart (Republican) 73.5%; ▌George H. Simmons (Democratic) 25.6%; ▌C. W. B. Kidder (Greenback) 0.8%
Vermont 2	Luke P. Poland	Republican	1866; 1874 (lost); 1882	Incumbent retired. Republican hold.	▌ ✓ William W. Grout (Republican) 69.8%; ▌Martin H. Goddard (Democratic) 29.3%; Others: ▌Charles B. Cummings (Greenback) 0.7%; ▌William P. Dillingham (Republican) 0.1%

== Virginia ==
District	Incumbent			This race	
District	Member	Party	First elected	Results	Candidates
Virginia 1	George T. Garrison	Democratic	1880; 1882 (contest)	Incumbent retired. Democratic hold.	▌ ✓ Thomas Croxton (Democratic) 51.0%; ▌Robert M. Mayo (Republican) 49.0%
Virginia 2	Harry Libbey	Readjuster	1882	Incumbent re-elected as a Republican. Republican gain.	▌ ✓ Harry Libbey (Republican) 58.3%; ▌Richard C. Marsrhall (Democratic) 41.7%
Virginia 3	George D. Wise	Democratic	1880	Incumbent re-elected.	▌ ✓ George D. Wise (Democratic) 52.4%; ▌Robert T. Hubard (Republican) 47.6%
Virginia 4	Benjamin S. Hooper	Readjuster	1882	Incumbent retired. Republican gain.	▌ ✓ James Dennis Brady (Republican) 40.5%; ▌George E. Rives (Democratic) 36.6%; ▌Joseph P. Evans (Republican) 22.9%
Virginia 5	George Cabell	Democratic	1874	Incumbent re-elected.	▌ ✓ George Cabell (Democratic) 55.0%; ▌J. W. Hartwell (Republican) 45.0%
Virginia 6	None (new district)			Incumbent re-elected.	▌ ✓ John W. Daniel (Democratic) 55.9%; ▌R. P. Morris (Republican) 44.1%
Virginia 7	Charles T. O'Ferrall	Democratic	1882 (contest)	Incumbent re-elected.	▌ ✓ Charles T. O'Ferrall (Democratic) 56.4%; ▌Joseph B. Webb (Republican) 43.6%
Virginia 8	John S. Barbour Jr.	Democratic	1880	Incumbent re-elected.	▌ ✓ John S. Barbour Jr. (Democratic) 55.6%; ▌Duff Green (Republican) 44.4%
Virginia 9	Henry Bowen	Readjuster	1882	Incumbent lost renomination as a Republican. Democratic gain.	▌ ✓ Connally Findlay Trigg (Democratic) 52.3%; ▌Daniel F. Bailey (Republican) 47.7%
Virginia 10	J. Randolph Tucker; Redistricted from the 6th district	Democratic	1874	Incumbent re-elected.	▌ ✓ J. Randolph Tucker (Democratic) 52.1%; ▌Jacob Yost (Republican) 47.9%
Virginia at-large	John Sergeant Wise	Readjuster	1882	Incumbent retired. Seat eliminated. Readjuster loss.	

== West Virginia ==
District	Incumbent			This race	
District	Member	Party	First elected	Results	Candidates
West Virginia 1	Nathan Goff Jr.	Republican	1882	Incumbent re-elected.	▌ ✓ Nathan Goff Jr. (Republican) 50.29%; ▌John Brannon (Democratic) 49.71%
West Virginia 2	William L. Wilson	Democratic	1882	Incumbent re-elected.	▌ ✓ William L. Wilson (Democratic) 52.18%; ▌Francis M. Reynolds (Republican) 47.82%
West Virginia 3	Charles P. Snyder	Democratic	1883 (special)	Incumbent re-elected.	▌ ✓ Charles P. Snyder (Democratic) 53.71%; ▌James W. Davis (Republican) 46.30%
West Virginia 4	Eustace Gibson	Democratic	1882	Incumbent re-elected.	▌ ✓ Eustace Gibson (Democratic) 50.23%; ▌A. R. Barber (Greenback/Republican) 49.77%

== Wisconsin ==
Wisconsin elected nine members of congress on Election Day, November 4, 1884.

District	Incumbent			This race	
District	Member	Party	First elected	Results	Candidates
Wisconsin 1	John Winans	Democratic	1882	Incumbent retired. Republican gain.	▌ ✓ Lucien B. Caswell (Republican) 54.6%; ▌Ernst Merton (Democratic) 41.3%; ▌Robert Fargo (Prohibition) 4.0%
Wisconsin 2	Daniel H. Sumner	Democratic	1882	Incumbent lost re-nomination. Democratic hold.	▌ ✓ Edward S. Bragg (Democratic) 55.4%; ▌Samuel S. Barney (Republican) 41.5%; Others: ▌Terah J. Patchen (Prohibition) 1.9%; ▌William M. Jones (Greenback) 1.2%
Wisconsin 3	Burr W. Jones	Democratic	1882	Incumbent lost re-election. Republican gain.	▌ ✓ Robert M. La Follette (Republican) 48.1%; ▌Burr W. Jones (Democratic) 46.7%; ▌John M. Olin (Prohibition) 5.2%
Wisconsin 4	Peter V. Deuster	Democratic	1878	Incumbent lost re-election. Republican gain.	▌ ✓ Isaac W. Van Schaick (Republican) 49.1%; ▌Peter V. Deuster (Democratic) 46.5%; ▌Henry Smith (Greenback) 3.8%; ▌C. E. Reed (Prohibition) 0.7%
Wisconsin 5	Joseph Rankin	Democratic	1882	Incumbent re-elected.	▌ ✓ Joseph Rankin (Democratic) 59.2%; ▌Charles Luling (Republican) 38.5%; Others: ▌John E. Thomas (Greenback) 1.6%; ▌D. I. Miller (Prohibition) 0.4%; ▌William Miller (Write-in) 0.2%
Wisconsin 6	Richard W. Guenther	Republican	1880	Incumbent re-elected.	▌ ✓ Richard W. Guenther (Republican) 49.9%; ▌Augustus L. Smith (Democratic) 46.2%; ▌J. J. Sutton (Prohibition) 2.9%; ▌W. E. Hanson (Greenback) 1.0%
Wisconsin 7	Gilbert M. Woodward	Democratic	1882	Incumbent lost re-election. Republican gain.	▌ ✓ Ormsby B. Thomas (Republican) 52.6%; ▌Gilbert M. Woodward (Democratic) 44.1%; ▌S. B. Loomis (Prohibition) 3.3%
Wisconsin 8	William T. Price	Republican	1882	Incumbent re-elected.	▌ ✓ William T. Price (Republican) 60.2%; ▌L. R. Larson (Democratic) 39.8%
Wisconsin 9	Isaac Stephenson	Republican	1882	Incumbent re-elected.	▌ ✓ Isaac Stephenson (Republican) 53.5%; ▌James Meehan (Democratic) 45.4%; ▌A. J. Smith (Prohibition) 1.0%

== Non-voting delegates ==
District	Incumbent			This race	
District	Delegate	Party	First elected	Results	Candidates
Idaho Territory at-large	Theodore F. Singiser	Republican	1882	Incumbent lost re-election. Democratic gain.	▌ ✓ John Hailey (Democratic) 52.80%; ▌Theodore F. Singiser (Republican) 46.40%; ▌W. S. Taylor (Independent) 0.73%
Montana Territory at-large	Martin Maginnis	Democratic	1872	Incumbent retired. Democratic hold.	▌ ✓ Joseph Toole (Democratic) 50.39%; ▌Hiram Knowles (Republican) 49.61%
Wyoming Territory at-large	Morton E. Post	Democratic	1880	Incumbent retired. Republican gain.	▌ ✓ Joseph M. Carey (Republican) 56.40%; ▌William H. Holliday (Democratic) 43.60%

== See also ==
- 1884 United States elections
  - 1884 United States presidential election
  - 1884–85 United States Senate elections
- 48th United States Congress
- 49th United States Congress

== Bibliography ==
- Dubin, Michael J. (March 1, 1998). United States Congressional Elections, 1788-1997: The Official Results of the Elections of the 1st Through 105th Congresses. McFarland and Company. ISBN 978-0786402830.
- Martis, Kenneth C. (January 1, 1989). The Historical Atlas of Political Parties in the United States Congress, 1789-1989. Macmillan Publishing Company. ISBN 978-0029201701.
- Moore, John L., ed. (1994). Congressional Quarterly's Guide to U.S. Elections (Third ed.). Congressional Quarterly Inc. ISBN 978-0871879967.
- "Party Divisions of the House of Representatives* 1789–Present". Office of the Historian, House of United States House of Representatives.
