= James Dale Strawbridge =

American politician

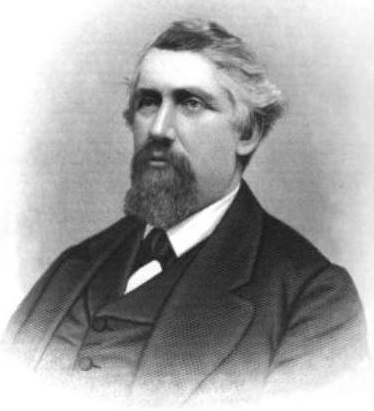
From 1875's The American Government II: Biographies of Members of the House of Representatives of the Forty-third Congress

James Dale Strawbridge (April 7, 1824 – July 19, 1890) was a Republican member of the U.S. House of Representatives from Pennsylvania.

== Biography ==
James D. Strawbridge was born in Liberty Township, Pennsylvania. He graduated from Princeton College in 1844 and from the medical department of the University of Pennsylvania at Philadelphia in 1847. He was engaged in the practice of medicine at Danville, Pennsylvania. During the American Civil War, Strawbridge entered the Union Army as a brigade surgeon of Volunteers and served throughout the war. He resumed the practice of medicine at Danville.

=== Congress ===
Strawbridge was elected as a Republican to the Forty-third Congress. After his time in Congress he returned to the practice of medicine. He died in Danville in 1890. Interment in Fairview Cemetery.

U.S. House of Representatives
Preceded by Frank Charles Bunnell	Member of the U.S. House of Representatives from Pennsylvania's 13th congressional district 1873–1875	Succeeded by James Bernard Reilly
