= William E. Gaines =

American politician (1844–1912)

William Embre Gaines

Member of the U.S. House of Representatives from Virginia's 4th district
- In office March 4, 1887 – March 3, 1889
- Preceded by: James D. Brady
- Succeeded by: Edward C. Venable

Member of the Virginia Senate from Lunenburg, Nottoway and Brunswick Counties
- In office 1884–1885
- Preceded by: F.B. Williams
- Succeeded by: William Worsham

Personal details
- Born: August 30, 1844 Charlotte Court House, Virginia
- Died: May 4, 1912 (aged 67) Washington, D.C.
- Resting place: Glenwood Cemetery, Washington D.C.
- Party: Republican
- Profession: lawyer

Military service
- Allegiance: Confederate States of America
- Branch/service: Confederate States Army
- Rank: Adjutant of Artillery
- Unit: 18th Virginia Infantry Regiment, Pickett's Division, Army of Northern Virginia
- Battles/wars: American Civil War

William Embre Gaines (August 30, 1844 – May 4, 1912) was a U.S. representative from Virginia.

== Biography ==
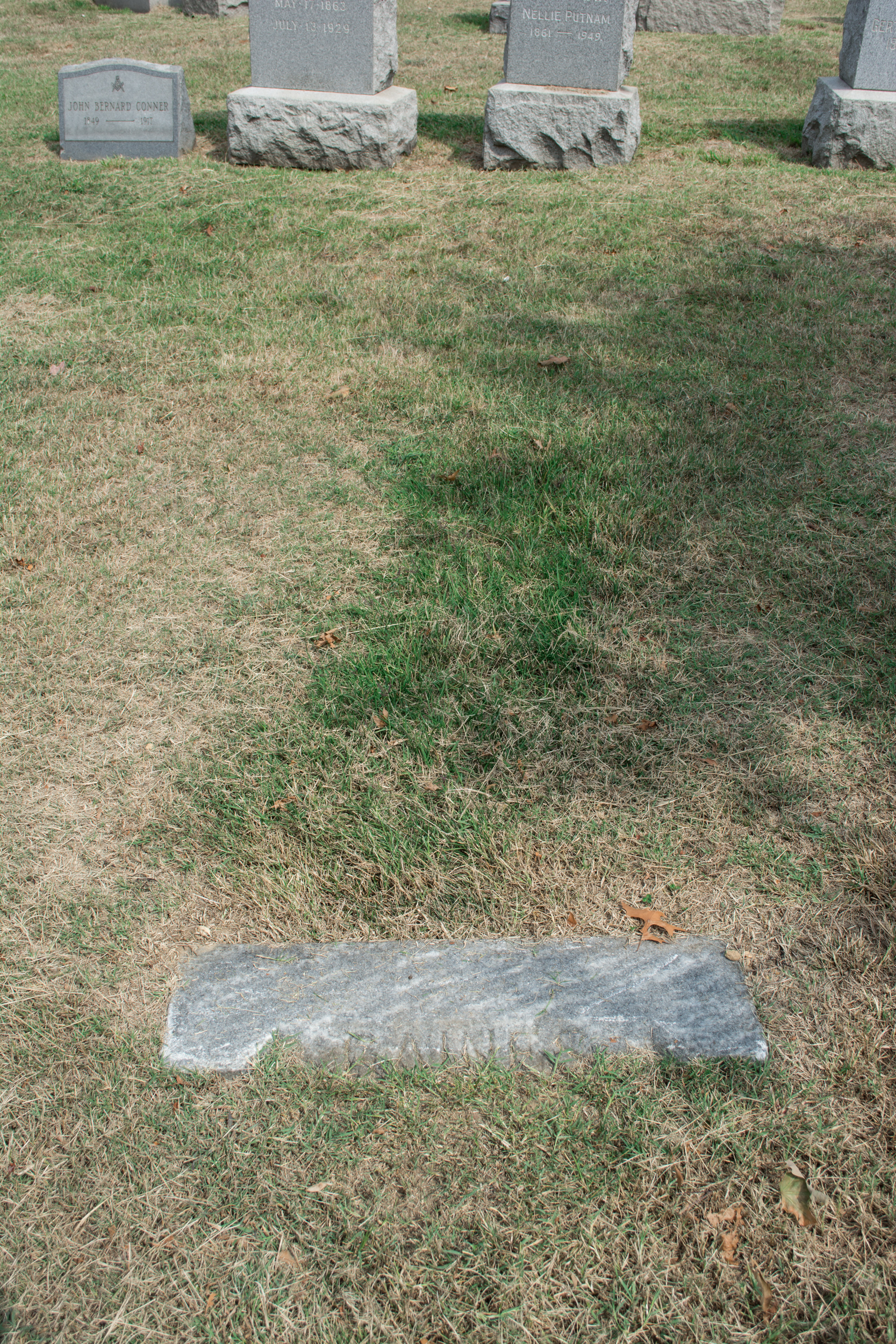
Grave of William Embre Gaines at Glenwood Cemetery.

Born near Charlotte Court House, Virginia, Gaines attended local public school. During the Civil War, he enlisted as a private in Company K of the 18th Virginia Regiment (Pickett's division). He reenlisted and joined the Army of the Cape Fear, which surrendered with General Joe Johnston near Greensboro, North Carolina, in April 1865. He attained the rank of adjutant in Manly's artillery battalion.

After the war, Gaines studied law, was admitted to the bar, and practiced in Burkeville, Virginia. He also engaged in the tobacco business and in banking. He was elected to the Senate of Virginia and served from 1883 to 1887, when he resigned. He served as delegate to the Republican National Convention in 1884, and later was mayor of Burkeville. He also was a delegate to several state Republican conventions.

Gaines was elected as a Republican to the 50th United States Congress (March 4, 1887 – March 3, 1889). He was not a candidate for renomination in 1888.

He died in Washington, D.C., on May 4, 1912, and was interred in Glenwood Cemetery.

== Electoral history ==
1886 - Gaines was elected to the U.S. House of Representatives with 70.24% of the vote, defeating Democrat Mann Page.

== Bibliography ==
- Bailey, N. Louise; Morgan, Mary L.; Taylor, Carolyn R. (1986). Biographical Directory of the South Carolina Senate: 1776-1985. Volume 1. Columbia, S.C.: University of South Carolina Press. ISBN 0872494799.
- United States Congress. "William E. Gaines (id: G000009)". Biographical Directory of the United States Congress.

U.S. House of Representatives
Preceded by James D. Brady	Member of the U.S. House of Representatives from Virginia's 4th congressional district 1887–1889	Succeeded by Edward C. Venable
