= Edward Carrington Venable =

American politician

Member of the U.S. House of Representatives from Virginia's 4th district
- In office March 4, 1889 – September 23, 1890
- Preceded by: William E. Gaines
- Succeeded by: John M. Langston

Personal details
- Born: January 31, 1853 Prince Edward County, Virginia
- Died: December 8, 1908 (aged 55) Baltimore, Maryland
- Resting place: Blandford Cemetery, Petersburg, Virginia
- Party: Democratic
- Education: University of Virginia
- Profession: Teacher, businessman

Edward Carrington Venable (January 31, 1853 – December 8, 1908) was a U.S. representative from Virginia.

== Biography ==
Born near Hampden-Sydney, in Prince Edward, Virginia, Venable attended the local school, McCabe's University High School, Petersburg, Virginia, and the University of Virginia at Charlottesville. He taught school for three years, and then returned to Petersburg in 1876 and engaged in mercantile pursuits.

He served as delegate to the Democratic State convention in 1886, and presented credentials as a Democratic Member-elect to the Fifty-first Congress and served from March 4, 1889, to September 23, 1890, when he was succeeded by John M. Langston, who successfully contested his election.

After losing reelection, Venable resumed his former business pursuits. He died in Baltimore, Maryland, December 8, 1908 and was interred in Blandford Cemetery, Petersburg, Virginia.

Edmund Carrington Venable was a formative figure in the early development of the Sons of the American Revolution at both the state and national levels. On February 10, 1890, he joined several members of the Virginia congressional delegation at the U.S. Capitol for the first organizational conference to establish the Virginia Society, where he was elected Secretary and appointed, with Gen. William H. F. Lee, to draft the Society’s initial Constitution, By‑Laws, and slate of officers. He continued in this leadership role throughout the spring, signing the June 26 circular inviting Virginians to become charter members and later being elected one of the original Managers when the Society was formally organized at Richmond on July 7, 1890. Venable also played an early role in the formation of the District of Columbia Society and is recorded as National SAR Member No. 1830, listed with the D.C. Society. His own eligibility derived from his great‑grandfather, Col. Samuel Woodson Venable of Prince Edward County, an Ensign in Watkins’s Troop of Horse noted for its service in the Southern Department and its distinguished conduct at Guilford Court House.

== Electoral history ==
1888; Venable was elected to the U.S. House of Representatives with 43.08% of the vote, defeating Republicans John Mercer Langston and R. W. Arnold but the election was contested and Langston was seated.

== Sources ==
- United States Congress. "Edward Carrington Venable (id: V000085)". Biographical Directory of the United States Congress.

U.S. House of Representatives
Preceded by William E. Gaines	Member of the U.S. House of Representatives from Virginia's 4th congressional district 1889–1890	Succeeded by John M. Langston
