= Cornelius C. Jadwin =

American politician (1835–1913)

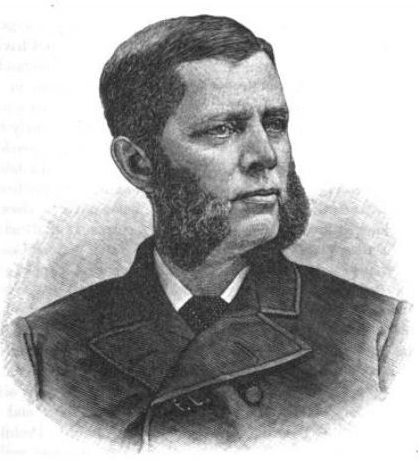
- 1886 portrait of Jadwin

Member of the U.S. House of Representatives from Pennsylvania's 15th district
- In office March 4, 1881 – March 3, 1883
- Preceded by: Edward Overton, Jr.
- Succeeded by: George Adams Post

Personal details
- Born: March 27, 1835 Carbondale, Pennsylvania, US
- Died: August 17, 1913 (aged 78) Honesdale, Pennsylvania, US
- Party: Republican

Cornelius Comegys Jadwin (March 27, 1835 – August 17, 1913) was a Republican member of the U.S. House of Representatives from Pennsylvania.

== Biography ==
Cornelius Comegys Jadwin was born in Carbondale, Pennsylvania. He attended the common schools and taught school for four years. He studied civil engineering and pharmacy. He was engaged as a civil and mining engineer from 1857 to 1861. He entered the drug business and located in Honesdale, Pennsylvania, in 1862. He served on the board of education of his district for nine years and was president for three years. He was a delegate to the 1880 Republican National Convention.

Jadwin elected as a Republican to the Forty-seventh Congress. He was an unsuccessful Independent candidate for reelection in 1882. He continued the drug business in Honesdale until his death there in 1913. He was interred in Glen Dyberry Cemetery.

== Sources ==
- United States Congress. "Cornelius C. Jadwin (id: J000042)". Biographical Directory of the United States Congress.
- The Political Graveyard

U.S. House of Representatives
Preceded by Edward Overton, Jr.	Member of the U.S. House of Representatives from Pennsylvania's 15th congressional district 1881-1883	Succeeded by George A. Post
