= Joseph Jorgensen =

American politician

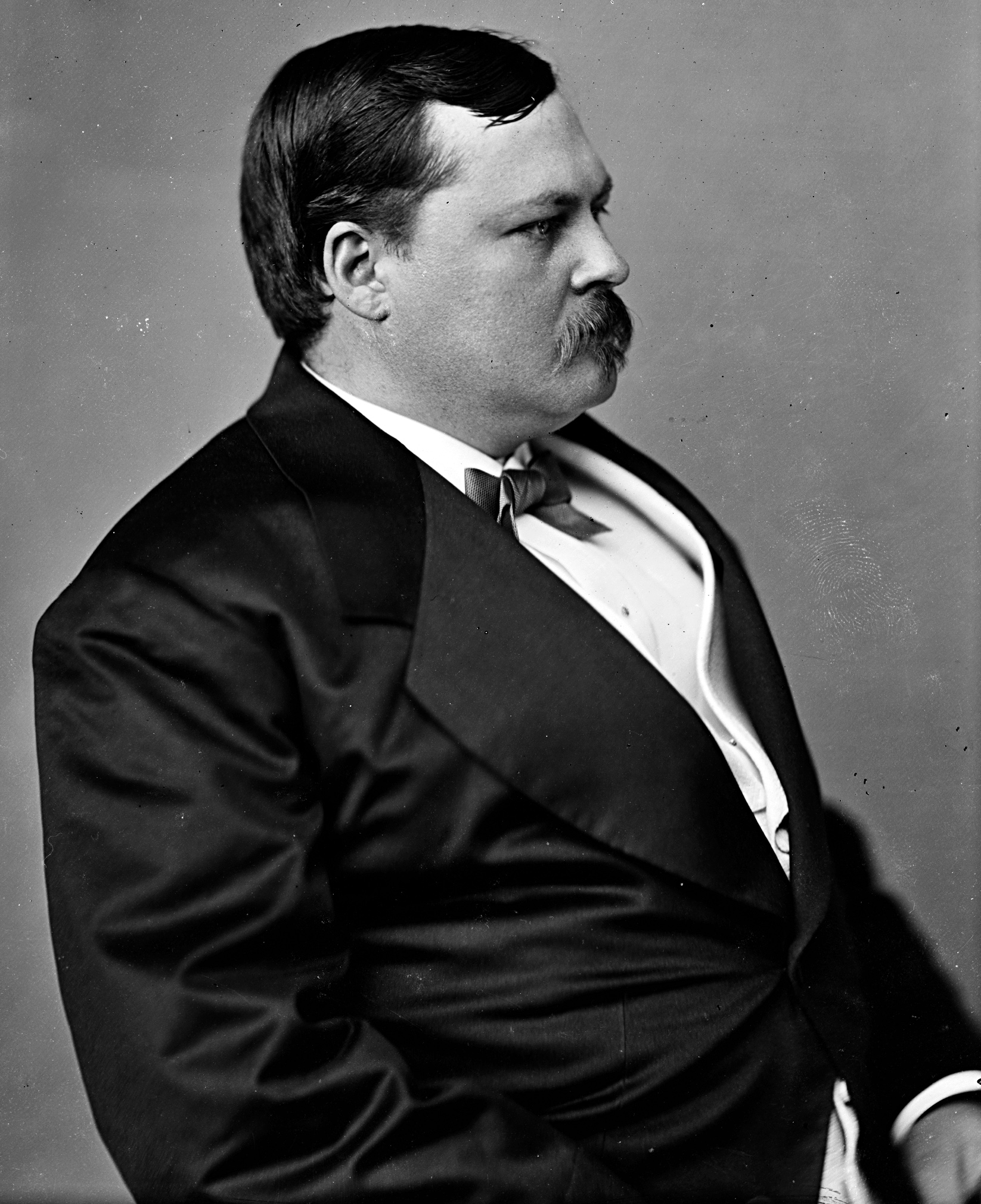

Member of the U.S. House of Representatives from Virginia's 4th district
- In office March 4, 1877 – March 3, 1883
- Preceded by: William H. H. Stowell
- Succeeded by: Benjamin Hooper

Chairman of the Committee on Mileage
- In office March 4, 1881 – March 3, 1883
- Preceded by: Thomas Cobb
- Succeeded by: Samuel Moulton

Member of the Virginia House of Delegates from Prince Edward County
- In office December 6, 1871 – January 1, 1874
- Preceded by: Thomas P. Jackson
- Succeeded by: Tazewell Branch

Personal details
- Born: February 11, 1844 Philadelphia, Pennsylvania
- Died: January 21, 1888 (aged 43) Portland, Oregon
- Resting place: Walla Walla, Washington
- Party: Republican
- Profession: civil servant, surgeon

Military service
- Branch/service: United States Army
- Years of service: 1864–1865; 1867–1870
- Rank: civilian surgeon
- Battles/wars: American Civil War

Joseph Jorgensen (February 11, 1844 – January 21, 1888) was a U.S. representative from Virginia.

== Biography ==
Born in Philadelphia, Pennsylvania, Jorgensen graduated from the medical department of the University of Pennsylvania in 1865. He served as a cadet surgeon in the United States Army in the latter part of the Civil War, from 1864 to 1865, rising to acting assistant surgeon, in mid-1865, and again serving from 1867 to 1870. He served as a member of the Virginia house of delegates from Prince Edward County from 1872 to 1873. He moved to Petersburg, Virginia. He was appointed postmaster of Petersburg, Virginia, May 21, 1874 – June 8, 1877, when he resigned, having been elected to Congress.

Jorgensen was elected as a Republican to the Forty-fifth and to the two succeeding Congresses (March 4, 1877 – March 3, 1883). He served as chairman of the Committee on Mileage (Forty-seventh Congress). He served as delegate to the Republican National Convention in 1880. He was appointed register of the land office at Walla Walla, Washington, by President Arthur February 27, 1883, and served until removed by President Cleveland in 1886. He died on January 21, 1888, in Portland, Oreg.. He was interred in Mountain View Cemetery, Walla Walla, Washington.

== Electoral history ==
- 1876; Jorgensen was elected to the U.S. House of Representatives with 51.91% of the vote, defeating Democrat William E. Hunton and Independent Republican M.R. De Mortie.
- 1878; Jorgensen was re-elected with 60.71% of the vote, defeating Democrat William E. Hinton, Jr.
- 1880; Jorgensen was re-elected with 70.1% of the vote, defeating Democrat Samuel F. Coleman and Independent William Ewan Cameron.

== Sources ==
- United States Congress. "Joseph Jorgensen (id: J000271)". Biographical Directory of the United States Congress.

U.S. House of Representatives
Preceded by William H. H. Stowell	Member of the U.S. House of Representatives from Virginia's 4th congressional district 1877–1883	Succeeded by Benjamin S. Hooper
