= Edward Overton Jr. =

American politician, lawyer, and soldier

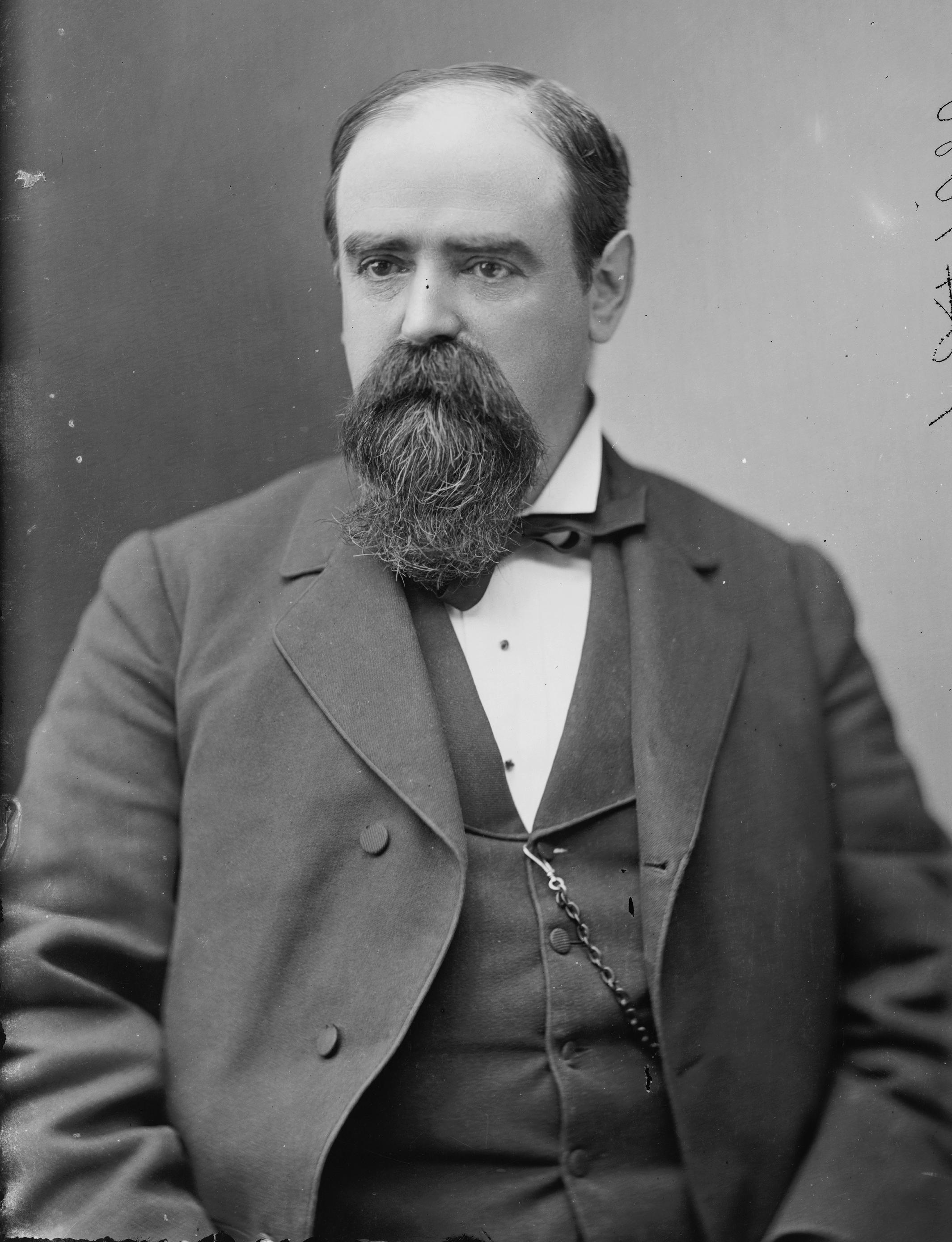
Edward Overton Jr.

Edward Overton Jr. (February 4, 1836 – September 18, 1903) was a Republican member of the U.S. House of Representatives from Pennsylvania.

== Biography ==
Overton was born in Towanda, Pennsylvania. He attended Susquehanna Collegiate Institute in Towanda, and graduated from Princeton College in 1856. He was a member of Kappa Alpha Society. He studied law, was admitted to the bar in 1858 and commenced practice in Towanda. He served as solicitor of Bradford County, Pennsylvania, in 1861. During the American Civil War, Overton entered the Union Army in September 1861 as a Major in the 50th Pennsylvania Volunteer Infantry Regiment. He was promoted to lieutenant colonel in 1863 and from that time commanded the regiment until mustered out in October 1864. He served as register in bankruptcy from 1867 to 1876.

Overton was elected as a Republican to the Forty-fifth and Forty-sixth Congresses. He was an unsuccessful candidate for renomination in 1880. He resumed the practice of law, and served as president of the Citizens' National Bank of Towanda from 1897 until his death in Towanda in 1903. Interment in Oak Hill Cemetery.

U.S. House of Representatives
Preceded by Joseph Powell	Member of the U.S. House of Representatives from Pennsylvania's 15th congressional district 1877-1881	Succeeded by Cornelius C. Jadwin
