= George Adams Post =

American politician

George Post
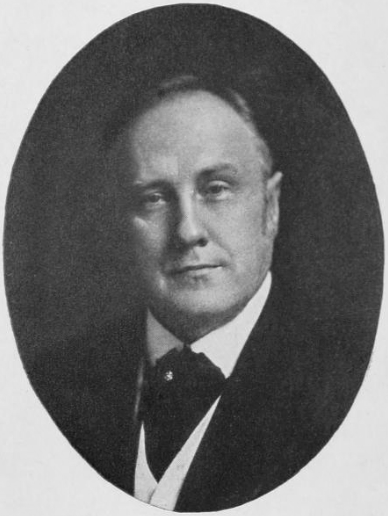

Member of the U.S. House of Representatives from Pennsylvania's 15th district
- In office March 4, 1883 – March 3, 1885
- Preceded by: Cornelius C. Jadwin
- Succeeded by: Frank C. Bunnell

Personal details
- Born: George Adams Post; September 1, 1854 Cuba, New York, US
- Died: October 31, 1925 (aged 71) Somerville, New Jersey, US
- Resting place: Evergreen Cemetery in Oswego, New York
- Party: Democratic
- Education: Oswego Academy

George Adams Post (September 1, 1854 – October 31, 1925) was a Democratic member of the U.S. House of Representatives from Pennsylvania.

== Early life ==
George Adams Post was born in Cuba, New York. He pursued an academic course at Oswego Academy. He moved to Susquehanna Depot, Pennsylvania. He was secretary of the motive power department of the Erie Railway. He was elected burgess in February 1877 and served one year. He studied law, was admitted to the bar in 1881 and commenced practice in Montrose, Pennsylvania. He was one of the owners and editors of the Montrose Democrat from 1883 to 1889.

== Career ==
Post was elected as a Democrat to the Forty-eighth Congress. He was a delegate to the 1884 Democratic National Convention. He served as chairman of the Democratic State convention in 1885.

=== Later career ===
He moved to New York City in 1889, and engaged as a writer for the New York World. He was engaged in the manufacture of railway equipment in 1892 and served as vice president and later president of the Standard Coupler Company. He was the founder and president of the Railway Business Association, and served as chairman of the railroad committee of the United States Chamber of Commerce.

=== Death and burial ===
He died in Somerville, New Jersey on October 31, 1925, and was interred in Evergreen Cemetery in Oswego, New York.

== See also ==
- Politics of the United States
- Politics of Pennsylvania

== Sources ==
- United States Congress. "George Adams Post (id: P000453)". Biographical Directory of the United States Congress.
- The Political Graveyard

U.S. House of Representatives
Preceded by Cornelius C. Jadwin	Member of the U.S. House of Representatives from Pennsylvania's 15th congressional district 1883 - 1885	Succeeded by Frank C. Bunnell
