= Frank C. Bunnell =

American politician

Frank Charles Bunnell
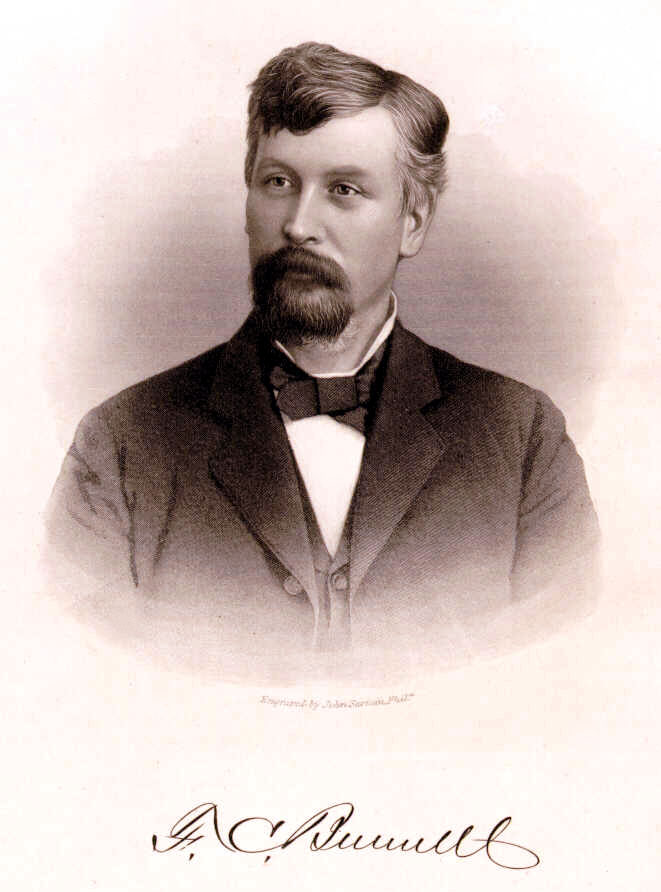

Member of the U.S. House of Representatives from Pennsylvania
- In office March 4, 1885 – March 3, 1889
- Preceded by: George A. Post
- Succeeded by: Myron B. Wright
- Constituency: 15th district
- In office December 24, 1872 – March 3, 1873
- Preceded by: Ulysses Mercur
- Succeeded by: James D. Strawbridge
- Constituency: 13th district

Personal details
- Born: March 19, 1842 Washington Township, Wyoming County, Pennsylvania, US
- Died: September 11, 1911 (aged 69) Philadelphia, Pennsylvania, US
- Party: Republican

Frank Charles Bunnell (March 19, 1842 – September 11, 1911) was a Republican member of the U.S. House of Representatives from Pennsylvania.

== Formative years ==
Born in Washington Township in Wyoming County, Pennsylvania on March 14, 1842 (alternate birth date: March 19), Frank C. Bunnell was a son of Pennsylvania natives James Bunnell (1814–1899) and Mary (Harding) Bunnell (1817–1898). Reared and educated initially with his sister, Savannah (1840–1864), in the common school of Dauphin County, he later attended the Wyoming Seminary in Kingston, Pennsylvania.

== Civil War ==
Frank Bunnell became one of the early responders to President Lincoln's call for volunteers to help preserve America's union. After enrolling on September 20, 1861, at the age of 19 at Mehoopany, Pennsylvania, he then officially mustered in on October 11, 1861, at Camp Curtin in Harrisburg as a private with Company B, 52nd Pennsylvania Infantry. Promoted to the rank of quartermaster sergeant of his regiment on March 1, 1862 during the Peninsula Campaign under General McClellan, he fought with his regiment in multiple engagements, including the Battle of Williamsburg (May 5, 1862) and Battle of Seven Pines (May 31 – June 2, 1862). He was subsequently discharged from the military on April 2, 1863, on a surgeon's certificate of disability.

== Post-war life ==
Following his honorable discharge from the military, Bunnell returned home to Luzerne County where, from 1864 to 1869, he worked as a merchant. He then relocated to Tunkhannock, Pennsylvania, where he worked in the agricultural and banking industries, and began a 20-plus-year tenure as president of the Wyoming County Agricultural Society.

On October 1, 1898, he wed Stroudsburg, Pennsylvania resident Martha A. Smith in Tunkhannock.

An unsuccessful candidate for federal office in 1872, he was elected to the Forty-second Congress to fill the vacancy caused by the resignation of Ulysses Mercur.

In 1884, he was elected burgess and borough treasurer of Tunkhannock.

A Republican, he was then elected again to the Forty-ninth and Fiftieth Congresses, but did not seek renomination in 1888. Still residing in Tunkhannock two years later, he was documented as suffering from rheumatism and deafness, according to the special census of Union veterans and widows of the Civil War which was conducted that year.

Residing alone in Tunhannock at the turn of the century, he relocated to Philadelphia sometime during or before 1911.

== Death and interment ==
Suffering from Bright's Disease and aortic regurgitation, Bunnell died at his home at 2320 North 19th Street in Philadelphia, Pennsylvania, on September 11, 1911. Following funeral services at the M.E. Church in Tunkhannock on September 15, he was laid to rest at that community's Gravel Hill Cemetery later that same day.

U.S. House of Representatives
Preceded by Ulysses Mercur	Member of the U.S. House of Representatives from Pennsylvania's 13th congressional district 1872–1873	Succeeded by James D. Strawbridge
Preceded by George A. Post	Member of the U.S. House of Representatives from Pennsylvania's 15th congressional district 1885–1889	Succeeded by Myron B. Wright
