= Benjamin S. Hooper =

American politician

Benjamin Stephen Hooper

Member of the U.S. House of Representatives from Virginia's 4th district
- In office March 4, 1883 – March 3, 1885
- Preceded by: Joseph Jorgensen
- Succeeded by: James D. Brady

Personal details
- Born: March 6, 1835 Buckingham, Virginia, US
- Died: January 17, 1898 (aged 62) Farmville, Virginia, US
- Party: Readjuster
- Profession: tobacco farmer

Military service
- Allegiance: Confederate States of America
- Branch/service: Confederate States Army
- Rank: Captain (CSA)
- Battles/wars: American Civil War

Benjamin Stephen Hooper (March 6, 1835 – January 17, 1898) was an American farmer and Confederate States Army veteran who served one term as a U.S. representative from Virginia from 1883 to 1885.

== Biography ==
Born near Buckingham, Virginia, Hooper attended the common schools. He engaged in mercantile pursuits and the manufacture of tobacco.

=== Civil War ===
He served in the Confederate States Army during the Civil War.

=== Congress ===
Hooper was elected as Readjuster to the Forty-eighth Congress (March 4, 1883 – March 3, 1885). After leaving Congress, he resumed mercantile pursuits at Farmville, Virginia. He served as a delegate to the Republican National Convention in 1888.

=== Death ===
He died in Farmville on January 17, 1898.

== Electoral history ==
1882: Hooper was elected to the U.S. House of Representatives with 75.46% of the vote, defeating Democrat William A. Reese and Republican Tazewell Branch.

== Notes ==
U.S. House of Representatives
Preceded by Joseph Jorgensen	Member of the U.S. House of Representatives from Virginia's 4th congressional district 1883–1885	Succeeded by James D. Brady
