= Joseph P. Evans =

American politician (1835–1888)

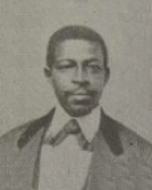

Member of the Virginia Senate from the City of Petersburg
- In office January 1, 1874 – December 1, 1875
- Preceded by: Roscoe G. Greene
- Succeeded by: William E. Hinton, Jr.

Member of the Virginia House of Delegates from the City of Petersburg
- In office December 6, 1871 – January 1, 1874
- Preceded by: Peter G. Morgan
- Succeeded by: Godfrey May

Personal details
- Born: Joseph P. Evans; 1835 Dinwiddie, Virginia, U.S.
- Died: 1888 (aged 52–53)
- Party: Republican; Independent (1884)

Joseph P. Evans (1835–1888) was an American politician who served as a Republican member of the Virginia House of Delegates from 1871 to 1874 and in the Senate of Virginia from 1874 to 1875, representing Petersburg. He was one of the first African-Americans to serve in Virginia's government.

He ran as an independent for Virginia's 4th congressional district in 1884, losing to Republican James Dennis Brady and Democrat George E. Rives.

== See also ==
- African American officeholders from the end of the Civil War until before 1900

Virginia House of Delegates
Preceded by Peter G. Morgan	Virginia Delegate for Petersburg City; 1871–1874	Succeeded by Godfrey May
Senate of Virginia
Preceded by Roscoe G. Greene	Virginia Delegate for Petersburg City; 1874–1875	Succeeded by William E. Hinton, Jr.
