= Daniel D. Whitney =

American politician

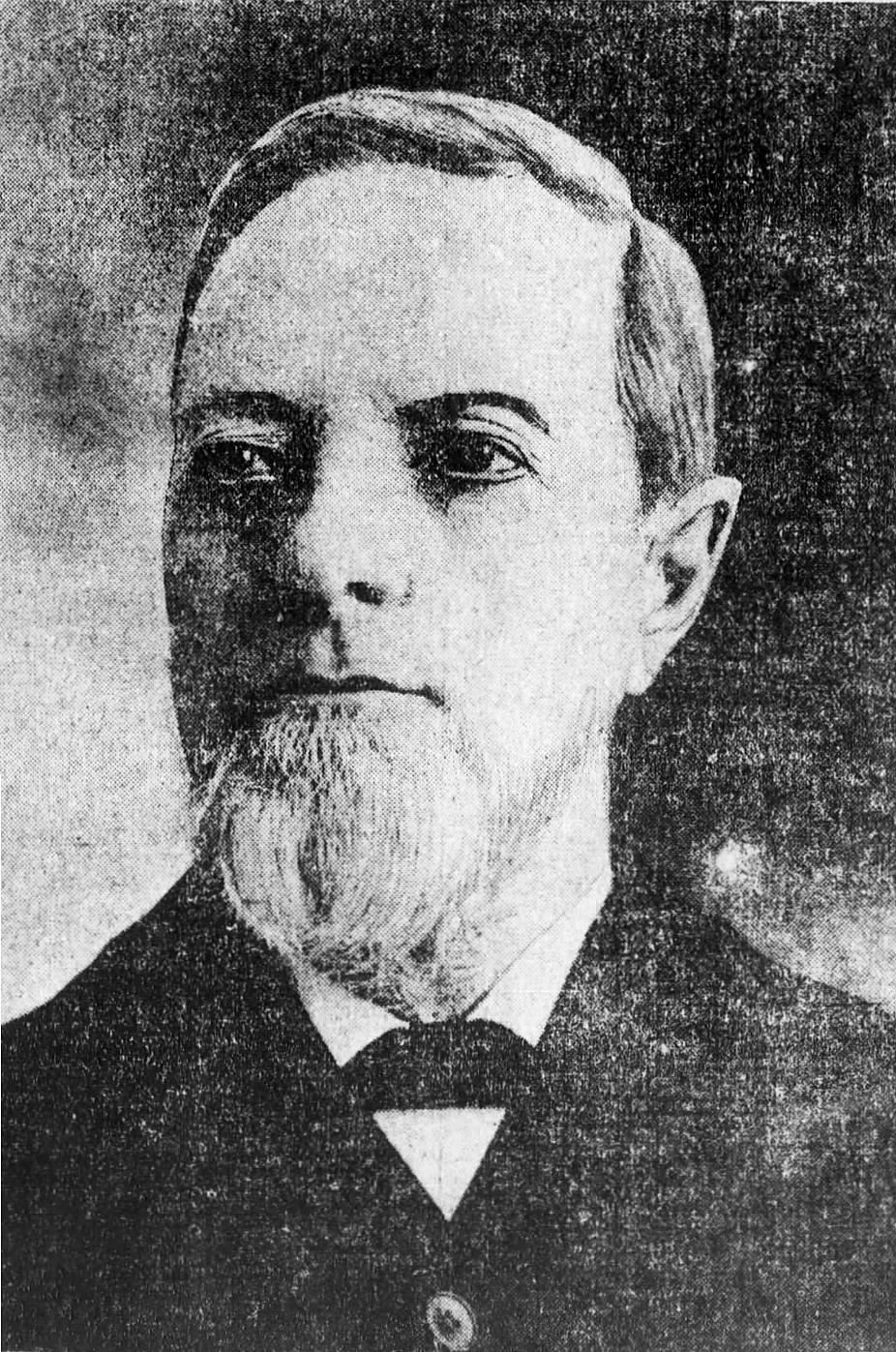

24th Mayor of Brooklyn
- In office 1886–1887
- Preceded by: Seth Low
- Succeeded by: Alfred C. Chapin

Personal details
- Born: January 31, 1819 Oyster Bay, New York
- Died: November 10, 1914 (aged 95) Brooklyn, New York
- Resting place: Green-Wood Cemetery
- Party: Democratic
- Spouse: Henrietta Titus
- Occupation: Grocer

Daniel D. Whitney (January 31, 1819 – November 10, 1914) was a Brooklyn grocer and Mayor of Brooklyn from 1886 to 1887.

== Early life ==
Whitney was born January 31, 1819, in Oyster Bay, New York. He moved to Brooklyn at age 18, and worked in a grocery store at 20 Fulton Street. He eventually became head of the grocery, and remained at the store until the day before he died.

== 1885 Brooklyn Mayors race ==
Reformer and incumbent Republican mayor Seth Low had fallen out of favor with national Republicans for crossing party lines to support Grover Cleveland over Republican James G. Blaine in the 1884 Presidential election. The national party blamed Low for losing New York State and thus the election. After losing party support, Low declined to run for a third term as Brooklyn Mayor in 1885. Not only was Low not on the ticket in the 1885 mayoral election, he refused to support the machine Republican candidate, General Isaac S. Catlin. Instead, he supported a reform candidate, General John B. Woodward. This Republican infighting presented an opportunity for Brooklyn Democrats to take back the mayoralty.

Daniel Whitney was an affable local grocer whose store was on Fulton Street, near Brooklyn City Hall. Whitney built up a reliable reputation during his four terms on the Board of Aldermen. This gained him the attention of the local Democratic political machine, run by party boss Hugh McLaughlin. The Democrats chose the relatively inexperienced Whitney to run for Brooklyn mayor in 1885. With the Republicans split between Catlin and Woodward, Whitney was able to win the mayoralty of Brooklyn by 12,000 votes.

Whitney's election marked the end of Low's reformist policies. Whitney's single mayoral term was described as "dull, plodding, but honest" by the Brooklyn Daily Eagle. Whitney was never particularly popular, but Democrats held power in Brooklyn for the next seven years. During this time Brooklyn city government returned to corrupt machine politics, as it had been before Low's time.

After his time as mayor, Whitney left political life and returned to run the small "old-fashioned" grocery where he had worked all his life, and continued there until the day before his death. In later years, Whitney was a central member of the Society of Old Brooklynites, a civic organization which remembered and celebrated the old days when Brooklyn was an independent city.

== Personal life ==
Whitney had three sons with his first wife; she died in 1889. He remarried at age 71 to Miss Henrietta Titus of Glen Cove, New York, in 1893; she was 45 years old.

Whitney was a member for over 50 years and trustee of the Sands Street Methodist Church. On January 30, 1909, on the eve of Whitney's 90th birthday, he was feted with a grand reception at the Sands Street church. "Several hundred" people attended, and speeches were given in his honor by Borough President Bird Sim Coler and ex-mayors Charles A. Schieren and David Boody.

On November 9, 1914, Whitney left his grocery a little early and walked to his nearby home on Poplar Street. His body was found in bed the next morning by his housekeeper.

The New York Times reported that Whitney's estate was valued at less than $4,000 when he died, and described him as a "comparatively poor man."

Political offices
| Preceded by Seth Low | Mayor of Brooklyn; 1886 – 1887 | Succeeded by Alfred C. Chapin |
