= Forest Park Carousel =

Carousel in Queens, New York

- U.S. National Register of Historic Places
- New York City Landmark
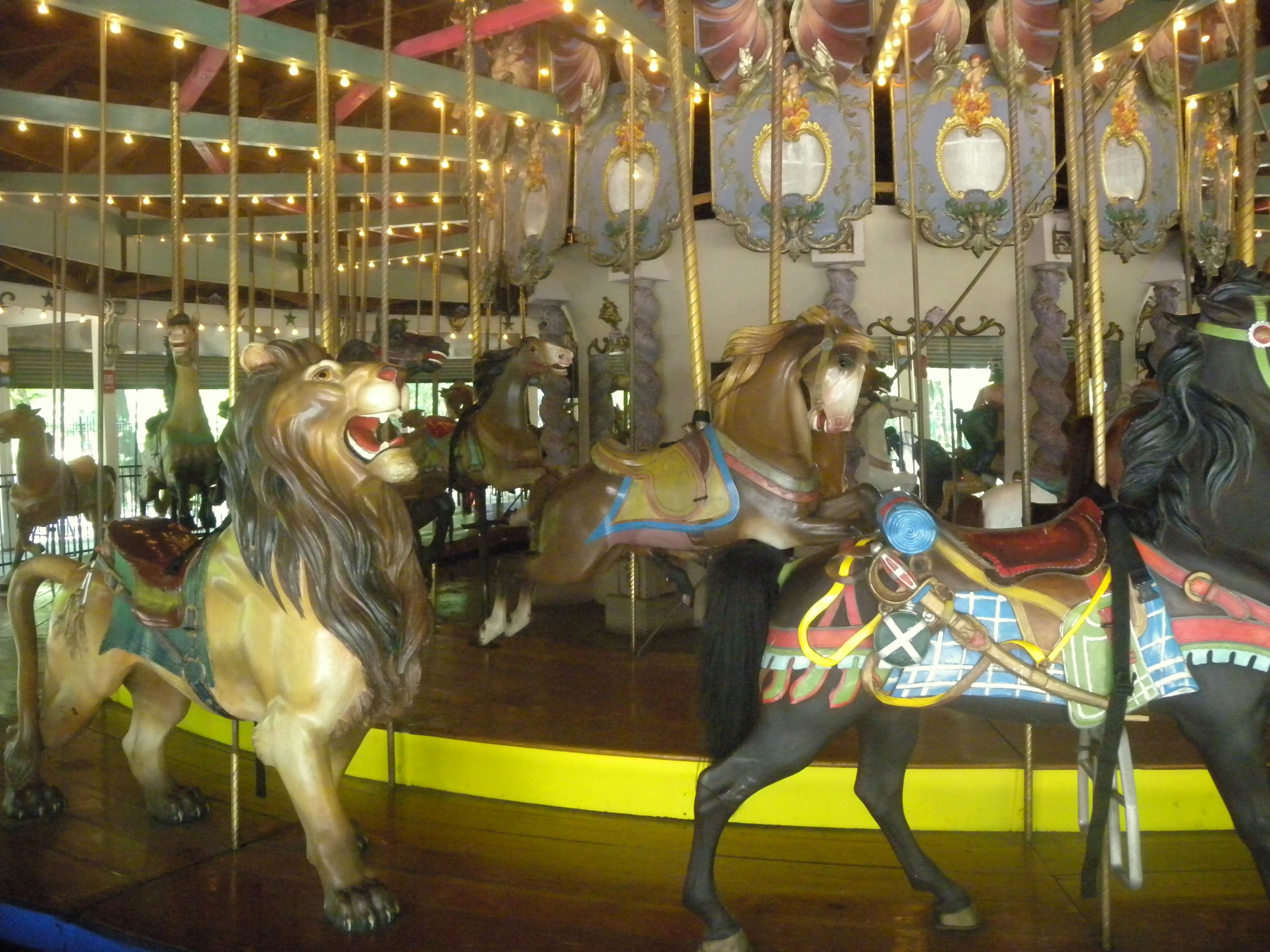
- Forest Park Carousel, July 2012
- Location: Woodhaven Boulevard and Forest Park Drive, Woodhaven, New York
- Coordinates: 40°42′01.3″N 73°51′24.2″W
- Area: less than one acre
- Built: c. 1903; 123 years ago
- Architects: Muller, D.C.
- NRHP reference No.: 04000706
- NYCL No.: 2528

Significant dates
- Added to NRHP: July 16, 2004
- Designated NYCL: June 25, 2013

The Forest Park Carousel is a historic carousel at Forest Park in the borough of Queens, New York City, United States. The carousel, one of two known surviving carousels built by Daniel Carl Muller, was built circa 1903 and contains 52 figures and its original band organ. Originally located in Dracut, Massachusetts, the carousel was relocated to Forest Park in 1972, replacing an earlier carousel on the site. The ride, operated by NY Carousel since 2012, is part of a seasonal amusement center called Forest Park Carousel Amusement Village. The Forest Park Carousel was listed on the National Register of Historic Places in 2004 and has been a New York City designated landmark since 2013.

The carousel is on Forest Park Drive, just west of Woodhaven Boulevard, and is housed in a one-story pavilion designed by Victor Christ-Janer. Its figures include 36 moving horses, 13 stationary horses, three menagerie figures, and two chariots. The horses, animals, and chariots are placed in three rows on a two-level rotating platform. Each of the horses has a different hand-carved design, and the horses also have realistic features such as glass eyes and genuine horse hair. Although Muller designed most of the horses, one horse is credited to William Dentzel, while two others are attributed to Charles Carmel. Two other horses were made of fiberglass and may date from the 1980s. The platform rotates around a wooden cabinet with a band organ designed by the Andreas Ruth and Sohn Band Organ Company. The organ is surrounded by 18 panels with murals, which were installed in the early 2000s and were designed by Jonathan Lev.

The current Forest Park Carousel is older than the structure that it replaced, which was built c. 1916 and burned down under suspicious circumstances in December 1966. The New York City Department of Parks and Recreation (NYC Parks) attempted to procure a replacement carousel for several years, and it gave Restaurant Associates a concession to operate the ride. Restaurant Associates bought Lakeview Park's carousel and reopened it in November 1973; the ride continued to operate until the mid-1980s. Carousel Parks Inc., led by Marvin Sylvor, leased the ride in 1988 and reopened it the next year following an extensive restoration. Sylvor operated the ride until 1993, and NYC Parks reassigned the concession to Carlos Colon the next year. After the carousel closed in 2008, various community groups began advocating for the ride to be designated as a New York City landmark. NY Carousel reopened the ride in 2012 following an extensive restoration, and it renovated the carousel again in 2014.

== Description ==
The carousel is near the center of Forest Park, a 500-acre park within the New York City borough of Queens. The carousel is on Forest Park Drive, just west of Woodhaven Boulevard, which separates the park's western and eastern sections. It is part of the Forest Park Carousel Amusement Village, a seasonal attraction with various games and a cafe. The ride is just north of Strack Pond and is surrounded by a visitor center, picnic grove, and the Forest Park Greenhouse; the surrounding area also contains a golf course, a clubhouse, and the Seuffert Bandshell. The current carousel was originally installed in Dracut, Massachusetts, United States, north of Lowell; it was relocated to Forest Park in 1972.

=== Carousel ===
The carousel was one of approximately a dozen (Note: The company made between 12 and 16 carousels.) manufactured by German immigrant Daniel Carl Muller. (Note: Sometimes spelled Mueller) It is Muller's only carousel in New York City and, along with the Midway Carousel at Cedar Point in Ohio, is one of two known remaining carousels made by the D.C. Muller and Brother Company. The New York Times wrote in 1976 that the carousel "reflects the more genteel Philadelphia style of Daniel Carl Mueller and the Dentzel family". Early reports cite either Michael or Gustav Dentzel as having built the carousel; Muller was associated with the Dentzel family until 1899 and from 1917 to 1928. The carousel has a diameter of 56 feet (17 m).

==== Horses and animals ====
When the carousel was reinstalled in the 1970s, it was cited as having 36 moving horses, 13 stationary horses, three menagerie figures (a panther, lion, and stag), and two chariots. By the 21st century, the current carousel included a wooden lion, deer, and tiger, although the horses (Note: National Park Service 2004, p. 4, said the carousel contained 52 total figures, including 49 horses. Landmarks Preservation Commission 2013, p. 5, cited the carousel as having 46 horses. A poster by Robyn Love, cited in Landmarks Preservation Commission 2013, p. 6, described the carousel as having 44 horses and 11 other carved animals.) and two chariots remained in place. The horses, animals, and chariots are placed in three rows on a two-level rotating platform. The stationary horses are in the outermost row and are the largest, while the middle and innermost rows have progressively smaller moving horses. They generally contain military motifs such as bedrolls and saddles. Each of the horses has a different hand-carved design in oil paint; some of the horses have tucked heads. The horses also have a large number of realistic features: for instance, the tails consist of genuine horse hair, and the horses have glass eyes.

Although Muller designed most of the horses, one horse is cited as having been designed by William Dentzel, while two others are attributed to Charles Carmel. Over the years, several of the horses have been replaced. Of Carmel's two horses, one has five feathers on its chest strap, while the other has a fringed shawl on its chest. William Dentzel's horse contains an object at the back of its saddle, which resembles a horse. Two other horses were made of fiberglass and may have been manufactured by the Fabricon Design Group, which renovated the ride in the late 1980s.

==== Organ ====
The platform rotates around a wooden cabinet with a band organ designed by the Andreas Ruth and Sohn Band Organ Company. The cabinet is divided into three sections and includes a scrolled molding at its top. The organ includes a set of nine pipes flanked by a drum and cymbals. Although these instruments were capable of playing pre-recorded music, they are no longer in use. The organ also contains a central power unit surrounded by 18 panels, each of which originally depicted the carousel's original location at Lakeview Park. The modern-day organ contains tall, narrow panels that are identical to each other. The lower sections of these panels have mirrors, as well as decorations surrounded by faces; there is a winged cherub with garlands atop each face. The panels originally contained projecting poles for the carousel's brass rings. The power unit is surrounded by modern-style wallboard.

The organ is surrounded by 18 panels with murals, which were installed in the early 2000s and were designed by Jonathan Lev. Each of the panels measure 2.5 by 9.5 feet (0.76 by 2.90 m). The murals depict nine scenes from Queens' history, including Forest Park's administration building and golf course, automobiles driving on a parkway (likely the Jackie Robinson Parkway), the first Forest Park Carousel, and the nearby Forest Hills Gardens neighborhood. At the time of the current carousel's construction, many carousels contained similar murals. The panels themselves are rounding boards with ornamental medallions between them.

=== Pavilion ===
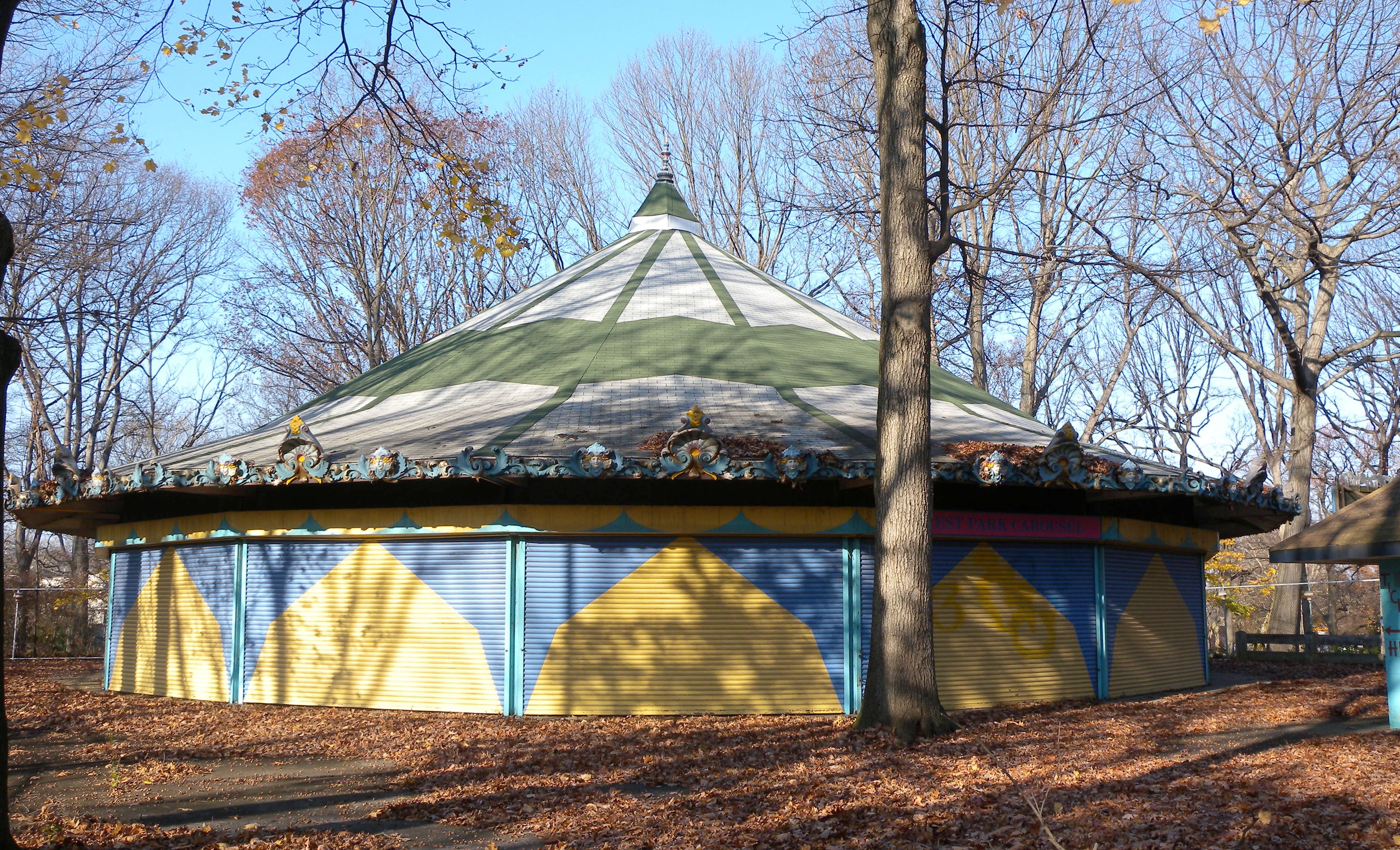
The pavilion as seen from Forest Park Drive

The carousel is installed within an octagonal, single-story wooden pavilion. Victor Christ-Janer originally designed a circular structure for the pavilion, but Fabricon Design Group modified the design in the 1980s. The pavilion contains vertical steel piers placed at regular intervals, as well as metal doors, which retract upward into the ceiling when the carousel is in operation. The piers support an overhanging eave, which is capped by a sloping roof, The eave contains wooden decoration such as carved faces, scrolls, and scallops. The roof has wooden rafters and tapers to a finial. The roof has vinyl tiles and a weather vane that date from 1998, as well as fiberglass castings installed in 1989. There is also a ticket booth that dates from 1989.

== History ==
=== Original carousel ===
Not much is known of Forest Park's original carousel, which occupied the same site as the current carousel. The first carousel was likely built in 1916, (Note: This has been erroneously given as the current carousel's construction date.) although local website QNS.com was unable to verify the exact date of the carousel's opening. It was designed by William Dentzel, son of prolific carousel manufacturer Gustav Dentzel. Its horses were described as being "of German design and import" by way of Coney Island. The Brooklyn Daily Eagle reported in 1932 that the city had selected bids for concessionaires "to install and operate a carousel in Forest Park". That year, the New York City government awarded a five-year contract to Fred J. L. Hassinger, who already operated a carousel at the park. According to the Eagle, although the city government owned the carousel structure, the concessionaire was responsible for providing the machine that powered the carousel.

==== Destruction and replacement attempts ====
The carousel was destroyed in a fire on December 10, 1966; investigators determined that the conflagration was "of suspicious origin". The Island Refreshment Corporation (IRC) operated the carousel at the time. Residents of the nearby Richmond Hill, Kew Gardens, Woodhaven, and Glendale neighborhoods indicated in February 1967 that they would ask the New York City Department of Parks and Recreation (NYC Parks) to provide money for several improvements to Forest Park, including a new carousel. That April, the Glendale Taxpayers Association asked the Queens borough president's office to fund the replacement of the Forest Park Carousel. IRC president Robert Stralle said the next month that the carousel would be replaced.

The city and IRC began planning a new carousel in mid-1967 after the city received a $50,000 insurance payout. By the end of the year, the city planned to rebuild the carousel and add several small attractions in the immediate area. Construction was expected to start in February 1968. Little progress occurred for two years until May 1970, when New York City parks commissioner August Heckscher said "we have made substantial progress toward the reconstruction of the carousel in Forest Park". NYC Parks opened a request for proposals (RFP), soliciting bids from concessionaires that wished to operate a proposed carousel and food-concession stand within the park. NYC Parks did not take any action on the bids for over a year, and community members complained that Heckscher had failed to respond to their queries. In late 1971, Heckscher and NYC Parks' concessions director Joseph Fallon said they were trying to procure a carousel from the defunct Palisades Amusement Park. Ultimately, Restaurant Associates was selected as the new concessionaire.

=== Current carousel ===
The current Forest Park Carousel was originally part of the Lakeview Amusement Park, a trolley park in Dracut, Massachusetts, that was developed in the late 19th century. The carousel was built c. 1903. (Note: Other sources give conflicting dates of 1890, 1901, 1905, 1910, or 1918.) The Barbuti family operated the carousel for 52 years, starting around 1920. The resort was largely destroyed by fire in 1950, although several of the park's individual operations continued to operate until 1971, including the carousel. Local residents referred to the attraction's horses as "Bobbie Horses".

==== Relocation and Restaurants Associates operation ====
After the 1971 season, the Barbuti family decided to sell off the carousel. The Lowell Sun wrote at the time: "Selling the carousel marked the death of that park that was once Dracut's pride." The carousel was acquired by Victor Christ-Janer, an architect from Connecticut, who initially planned to sell the ride to an amusement park. He removed several of the horses; sources disagree over whether he gifted them to his employees or sold them to private collectors. In any case, Christ-Janer instead opted to sell it to Arthur Schleifer of Restaurant Associates, who paid $30,000 for the carousel. Prior to obtaining the Lakeview Park carousel, Schleifer had considered buying at least 24 carousels over the preceding two years.

In January 1972, Heckscher announced that Restaurant Associates was to install a carousel in Forest Park by that June at a cost of $100,000. By that April, the reopening date had been pushed back to 1973. A pavilion was being built for the relocated carousel near the intersection of Woodhaven Boulevard and Forest Park Drive. City councilman Frederick D. Schmidt asked that the New York City Police Department patrol the area around the carousel, citing the fact that several violent crimes had recently occurred in that section of the park. Three technicians worked on the carousel and replaced many defective components with handmade pieces. Frederick Fried, who had written a book about American carousels in 1964, was involved in the ride's restoration. Regional newspaper Newsday wrote that he was "instrumental in bringing the Muller carousel to Queens". Parks, Recreation and Cultural Affairs administrator Richard M. Clurman rededicated the carousel in November 1973; the project had cost $275,000. Initially, Mike Conroy managed the ride, one of five wooden carousels operating in New York City at the time. (Note: Other carousels at the time included the Flushing Meadows Carousel; the Central Park Carousel; the Prospect Park Carousel at Prospect Park; and the B&B Carousell on Coney Island.)

The relocation of Lakeview Park's carousel to Forest Park coincided with the 1975 New York City fiscal crisis, during which New York City's public parks declined in quality. The carousel had become rundown by the late 1970s, despite Restaurant Associates' efforts to maintain the ride. Eventually, Restaurant Associates subleased the carousel's operation to various other firms. In the mid-1980s, (Note: Some sources cite a closure date of 1984, while other sources give a closure date of 1985.) the carousel stopped operating after NYC Parks declined to renew the operator's contract. The ride fell into a state of neglect after it closed. Political candidates Peter King and John Imperiale said in 1986 that Forest Park's carousel and bandshell were a popular meeting place for drug dealers. By 1987, members of Queens Community Board 9 recommended that NYC Parks create a master plan for Forest Park and that the agency restore the carousel. Mary Ann Carey, a district manager for Community Board 9, contacted Queens borough president Claire Shulman after learning of a proposal to replace the carousel with a replica. Shulman then opened an RFP for the restoration of the existing carousel.

==== Carousel Parks operation ====
Carousel Parks Inc., led by Brooklyn-based carousel manufacturer Marvin Sylvor, leased the carousel for five years starting in November 1988. At the time, the carousel had not been in operation for several years; it had been graffitied, and parts of the carousel's animals were broken or had fallen off. Although the cost of restoring the ride was estimated at $500,000 to $600,000, a Sotheby's expert appraised the carousel at $1.5 million. A New York Daily News reporter said the carousel's valuation was "like finding a carton of Faberge eggs in the bottom of the corner grocer's dairy case", while Sylvor said it "was like buying a Rembrandt for $25". Fabricon Design Group, a local firm co-headed by Sylvor and Bonnie Garry, restored the ride; this was the company's first carousel-restoration project. Several local firms donated materials for the carousel's renovation, and a nonprofit organization, Carousel Restoration Inc., was established to raise money for the project. Fabricon restored the ride using parts that were discovered in a pit under the carousel, and it may have also installed the ticket booth. The renovation ultimately cost $450,000.

Carousel Parks was contractually obligated to reopen the ride by July 4, 1989. The ride was rededicated on that date, with customers paying $1 for three-minute rides on the carousel. Despite the extensive restoration, the carousel was closed shortly after its reopening because the carousel's main gear had cracked. The ride's turning mechanism was repaired in 1990, as were the floor and poles, and Sylvor began raising money to stabilize the carousel's frame and improve its lighting. Sylvor and Garry withdrew from the carousel's operation in early 1993, prompting NYC Parks to begin searching for another operator. Sylvor cited low patronage and increasing costs in his decision to withdraw from the operating agreement. NYC Parks wanted the new concessionaire to conduct additional upgrades, such as a heating system, and to introduce additional amusement rides near the carousel. The ride was valued at $1.8 million. Around the same time, the New York City government contemplated selling the ride for parts to raise money.

==== Colon operation and closure ====
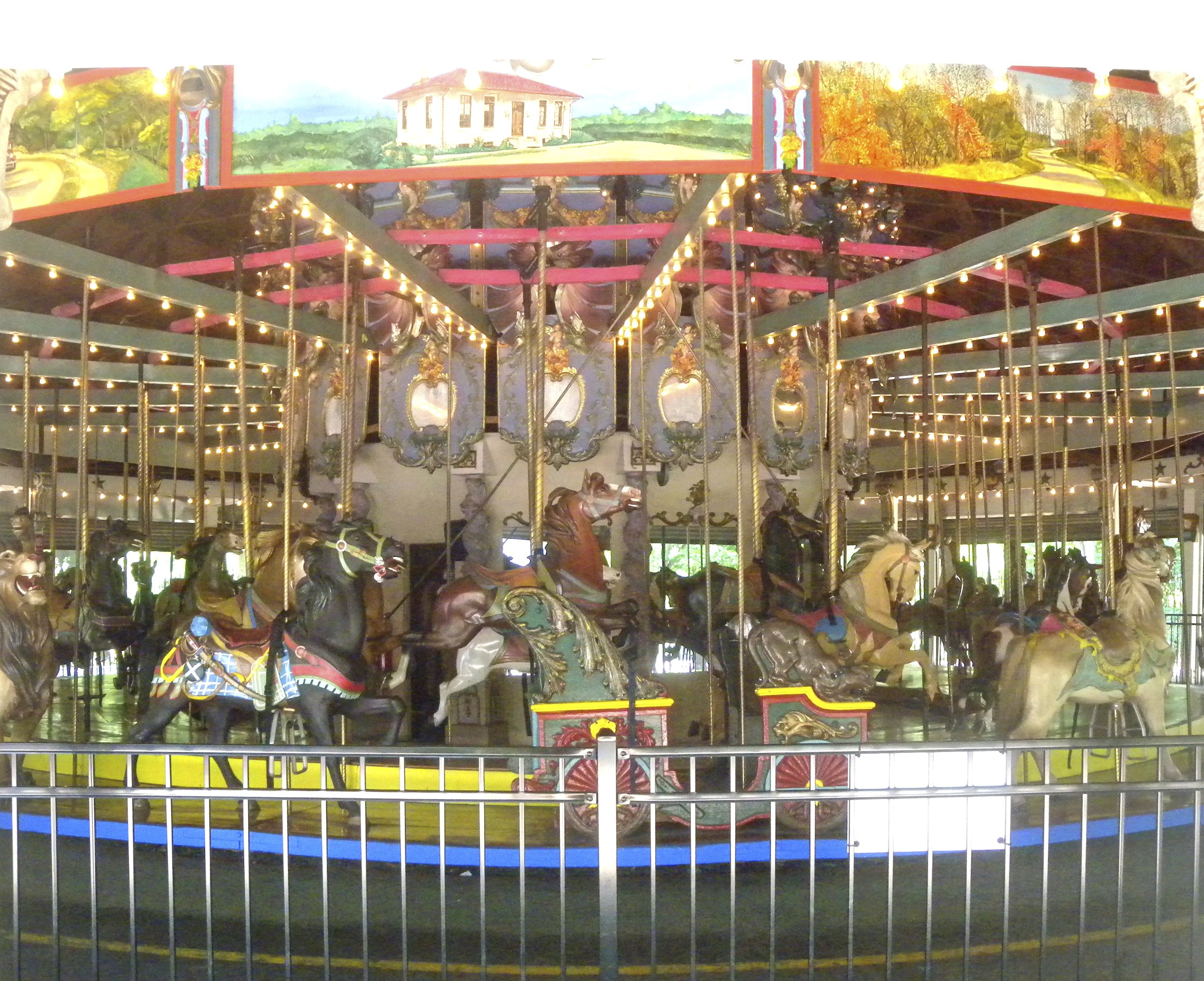
View of the carousel without riders

Spanish-born entrepreneur Carlos Colon (Note: The New York Daily News spelled his name Colons in 2003, but other sources, including another Daily News article, give his name as "Colon".) signed a contract with NYC Parks in 1994 to operate the ride for five years. NYC Parks held an exhibition at Forest Park in 1995, displaying artifacts relating to the Forest Park and Flushing Meadows carousels. The carousel's patronage suffered because of its relatively secluded location, leading the Daily News to refer to the carousel as one of "Queens' little-known treasures". By the late 1990s, various local community groups were advocating for the carousel to be designated as a New York City landmark. The New York City Landmarks Preservation Commission (LPC) declined the groups' request in December 1998, in part because it was not a permanent structure. According to the LPC, the pavilion lacked architectural or historical significance, while the carousel itself did not qualify as an interior landmark. A similar attempt to designate the carousel as a regular city landmark failed in 2000. Afterward, the groups asked the New York state government to place the ride on the New York State Register of Historic Places and the National Register of Historic Places (NRHP).

Colon restored the carousel ahead of its centennial, and Gandhi Engineering was hired as the restoration engineer. The artist Jonathan Lev was commissioned to paint 18 panels for the carousel around 2000; the panels were installed in 2002. At the ride's centennial in 2003, several preservationists signed a petition to prevent the demolition of the carousel, although city officials said they had no plans to modify it. NYC Parks and local organizations, with the endorsement of state senator Serphin R. Maltese, nominated the carousel for inclusion on the NRHP the same year; such a designation would provide federal funding for the ride. The carousel was added to the NRHP in July 2004, and officials held a ceremony to celebrate the NRHP listing in October 2004. The carousel had low patronage because it was poorly marked; a report in the late 2000s found that the only signage acknowledging the ride's existence was directly outside the carousel. As a result, each of its operators consistently lost money.

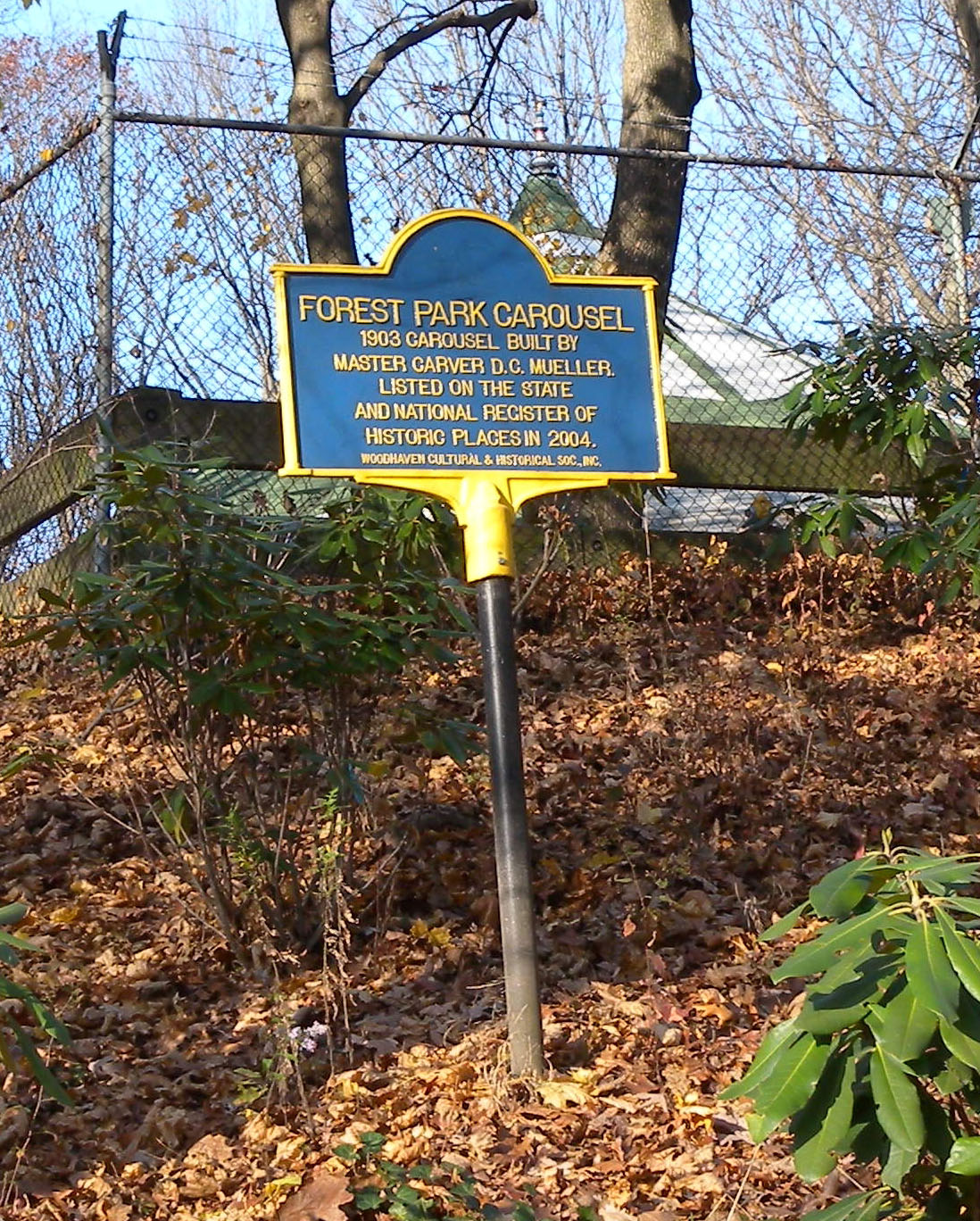
Historical marker in 2009

By the late 2000s, Thomas Makkos of New York One LLC operated the ride. New York One allowed its operating contract to expire in 2009, and the carousel did not operate during that season. Although NYC Parks had opened an RFP for new operators in late 2008, it had not received any responses. The agency canceled its contract with New York One and opened another RFP in early 2009, seeking a concessionaire that would restore the ride and promote it. Despite assurances that the ride would reopen for the 2010 season, the agency could not secure a new operator for that season. During the ride's closure, it was used as a filming location for the movie The Sitter in 2010. Potential concessionaires were turned away by the ride's unprofitability, particularly compared to the Flushing Meadows Carousel, whose operating lease expired in 2011. NYC Parks tried to attract concessionaires by offering to lease both carousels to a single operator, as well as allowing the concessionaire to serve alcoholic beverages and add amusement rides near both carousels. Despite only receiving a single bid from Sal Napolitano (who had maintained New York City carousels for four decades), NYC Parks rejected Napolitano's bid.

Meanwhile, local groups again began advocating for the carousel to be designated as a city landmark. They also created a Facebook page and distributed T-shirts to raise awareness for the carousel. Community members looked for a nonprofit organization to operate the carousel, expressing concerns that the ride could be sold for parts, as it was not bound by city landmark regulations. Maria Thomson of the Greater Woodhaven Development Corporation said the LPC had declined a previous request to designate the carousel as a landmark because the fence near the carousel was not old enough to qualify for landmark status.

==== NY Carousel operation ====
NYC Parks reported in February 2012 that it had agreed to lease out the carousel under a long-term contract. NY Carousel was announced as the winning bidder the next month. The company restored the carousel, which including removing the fences around the ride's perimeter, repainting the structure, and reopening the concession stand. NYC Parks applied for an Environmental Protection Fund grant to help restore the horses. The carousel reopened on May 26, 2012, and quickly became popular among local residents. Ami Abramson of NY Carousel began selling alcoholic beverages near the carousel, and he began planning additional rides near the carousel as part of his contract with NYC Parks. By the end of the 2012 season, Abramson reported that he had sold 30,000 carousel tickets. The restored carousel was featured in such media as a Saturday Night Live skit and in an ad in Vanity Fair magazine.

During Hurricane Sandy in 2012, a tree fell onto the carousel building; the carousel itself was not damaged. The LPC had planned to host a public hearing in late 2012 to determine whether to designate the ride as a landmark, but the meeting did not occur as scheduled. The agency finally hosted discussions about the ride's potential landmark status in early 2013; NY Carousel did not object to the proposed designation. The LPC designated the carousel as a city landmark in June 2013, and city officials installed a landmark plaque on the ride that October. The carousel was the first in New York City to be designated as an individual city landmark, (Note: Central Park and Prospect Park, which are scenic landmarks, both have carousels that are protected by the scenic-landmark designation, although neither of these rides is designated as an individual landmark.) and it was one of three operational (Note: The Parachute Jump on Coney Island is also an individual city landmark but is not operational.) amusement rides in the city with such a designation, along with the Coney Island Cyclone and the Wonder Wheel.

Ahead of the 2014 operating season, the carousel's lights were replaced with LEDs, and new mirrored panels were installed. Shortly after the carousel reopened, some riders expressed concerns about the carousel's roughness. As a result, during the 2014–2015 off-season, the carousel was disassembled and repaired by Carousels & Carvings. NY Carousel added several games and rides around the carousel in 2018 as part of the Forest Park Carousel Amusement Village, as well as a Ferris wheel in 2019.

== See also ==
- Amusement rides on the National Register of Historic Places
- List of New York City Designated Landmarks in Queens
- National Register of Historic Places listings in Queens County, New York
