= William F. Lamb =

American architect (1883–1952)

- Lamb in 1941
- Born: November 21, 1883; Brooklyn, New York, U.S.
- Died: September 8, 1952 (aged 68); New York City, U.S.
- Education: Williams College; Columbia School of Architecture; Ecole des Beaux Arts
- Occupation: Architect
- Relatives: Frederick W. Wurster (uncle)
- Practice: Carrère & Hastings; Carrère, Hastings, Shreve & Lamb; Shreve & Lamb; Shreve, Lamb and Harmon
- Buildings: Empire State Building

William Frederick Lamb FAIA (November 21, 1883 – September 8, 1952), was an American architect, chiefly known as one of the principal designers of the Empire State Building.

== Biography ==
William Frederick Lamb was born on November 21, 1883, in Brooklyn. His father, William Lamb, was a widely known building contractor in Brooklyn and was originally from Glasgow, Scotland. His mother, Mary Louise Lamb (née Wurster), was the sister of Frederick W. Wurster, the last mayor of Brooklyn before it was consolidated with New York City on January 1, 1898.

Lamb joined the New York architecture firm Carrère & Hastings in 1911, shortly after returning from Paris, where he earned a diploma at the École des Beaux-Arts. Lamb became a partner in 1920; the firm would be known as Shreve & Lamb from 1924 to 1929 and thereafter as Shreve, Lamb and Harmon. Lamb and the firm's notable projects included the Empire State Building, the Standard Oil Building, 521 Fifth Avenue, the Forbes Magazine Building, and the General Motors Building in New York City; the Acacia Mutual Life Insurance Company Building in Washington, D.C.; the Reynolds Building in Winston-Salem, North Carolina; and academic buildings for the Connecticut College for Women, Williams College, Cornell University, and Wesleyan University. The firm also designed an addition to the Bankers Trust Company Building and worked with H. Craig Severance on 40 Wall Street in New York.

In addition to his studies at the École des Beaux Arts, Lamb received a bachelor's degree from Williams College in 1904 and did graduate work at the School of Architecture, Columbia University, from 1904 to 1906. Lamb received an honorary doctorate from Williams College in 1932; other honors include two gold medals from the Fifth Avenue Association (1930, 1931), a medal from the Architectural League of New York (1931), and a medal of honor from the New York Chapter of the American Institute of Architects (1932).

Lamb was a member of the American Academy of Arts and Letters, the Art Commission of the City of New York, the Beaux-Arts Institute of Design, and the Architectural League of New York. In the period preceding the 1939 New York World's Fair, Lamb served as "Coordinator of Design" for the fair's board of planners. Lamb served on the U.S. Commission of Fine Arts from 1937 to 1945, including as vice chairman from 1941 to 1945. In 1942 he was elected into the National Academy of Design as an Associate member and became a full Academician in 1950.

Lamb died in New York City on September 8, 1952, after a prolonged illness.

== Bibliography ==
- Tauranac, John (1995). The Empire State Building: The Making of a Landmark. New York: St. Martin's Griffin. pp. 102–4. ISBN 0-312-14824-0.
