= Marvin Sylvor =

American designer (1933–2008)

Marvin Sylvor (April 21, 1933 – April 9, 2008) was an American carousel and merry-go-round designer and artist. Sylvor has designed more than sixty carousels worldwide including Bryant Park in New York City, New Zealand, Saudi Arabia, Brazil, Singapore and other parts of the United States.

== Early life ==
Sylvor was raised in the Bronx and grew up on the corner of 165th Street and Jerome Avenue, which is located near Yankee Stadium. He and his father, a sign painter, would vacation in the Rockaways every year. Each year Sylvor would ask to ride a carousel which they would pass near Marine Parkway Bridge on the way to their vacation. Sylvor's father, whom he described as always in a hurry to get to their vacation destination, always refused to stop for the carousel ride. Sylvor later told the New York Times in a 2002 interview why his father never stopped. "He was a man on a mission to get to the Rockaways."

Sylvor graduated from William Howard Taft High School in the South Bronx and then enlisted in the United States Army. While he was stationed as an Army private at the Schofield Barracks in Hawaii during the 1950s, a lieutenant asked the privates at attention if any of them were artists. Sylvor was selected from the group because he said he was the only man who actually had his paint brushes with him, which was a lie. Truthfully, Sylvor was an untrained artist who did not have brushes with him. He had to sneak off the base to buy some from civilian stores. However, Sylvor successfully managed to decorate the officers' club for a party and was soon commissioned for a series of other Army painting jobs around the base.

== Carousels ==
Sylvor went on to receive his degree from the Pratt Institute in Brooklyn in 1958. He founded a window display and decorating business, called Fabricon, following his graduation. His business was successful and he was hired to design displays for a number of well known clients including Bloomingdale's, Henri Bendel and the Vatican Pavilion of the 1964 New York World's Fair in Queens. He joined the National Carousel Association around the same time period as the 1964 World's Fair and began traveling to NCA conventions around the country. He initially had little experience building carousels and had to hire outside experts to help with construction. However, the carousels soon gave his business more work than window designing.

Sylvor built all of his carousels in the Fabricon factory in East New York, Brooklyn. He kept an inventory of approximately 100 horses and what the carousel industry calls "menagerie creatures" at the factory. He specialized in unusual animals for his carousels, such as frogs or birds. His favorite figures are called "jumpers," which are carousel animals which move up and down.

He retired from the full-time business in 2005.

== Death ==
Marvin Sylvor died of kidney failure in Miami, on April 9, 2008, at the age of 74. He was survived by his wife, Julia, and a son and daughter.

== Incomplete list of locations of Marvin Sylvor carousels ==
- Bryant Park, Manhattan, New York
- Riverbank State Park, Manhattan, New York
- Restoration of Forest Park Carousel, Forest Park, Queens, New York
- Chicago, Illinois
- Detroit, Michigan
- Nashville, Tennessee
- La Paz, Bolivia
- São Paulo, Brazil
- Auckland, New Zealand
- Riyadh, Saudi Arabia
- Singapore
