= Alfred C. Chapin =

American lawyer & politician (1848–1936)

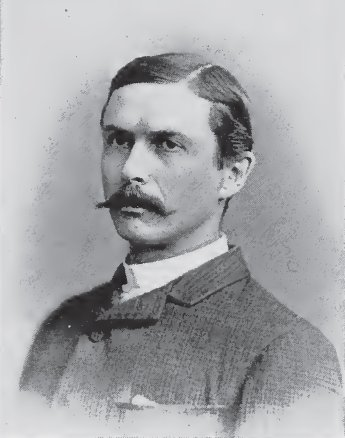

Member of the House of Representatives from New York's 2nd District
- In office November 3, 1891 – November 16, 1892
- Preceded by: David A. Boody
- Succeeded by: John M. Clancy

Mayor of Brooklyn
- In office 1888–1891
- Preceded by: Daniel D. Whitney
- Succeeded by: David A. Boody

New York State Comptroller
- In office 1884–1887
- Governor: Grover Cleveland; David B. Hill
- Preceded by: Ira Davenport
- Succeeded by: Edward Wemple

Personal details
- Born: Alfred Clark Chapin; March 8, 1848 South Hadley, Massachusetts, United States
- Died: October 2, 1936 (aged 88) Montreal, Quebec, Canada
- Party: Democratic
- Spouses: Grace Stebbins (m. 1884; died 1908) Charlotte Storrs Montant (m. 1913)
- Relations: Hamilton Fish IV (grandson)
- Parent(s): Ephraim Atlas Chapin; Josephine Clark
- Education: Williams College; Harvard Law School

Alfred Clark Chapin (March 8, 1848 – October 2, 1936) was an American lawyer and politician who served as the Mayor of Brooklyn and for one year as a member of the United States House of Representatives from 1891 to 1892.

== Early life ==
Chapin was born to Ephraim Atlas Chapin who had interests in the railroad and Josephine, née Clark. He had a younger sister Alice Chapin who was an actress and suffragette.

He attended the public and private schools and graduated from Williams College (in Williamstown, Massachusetts) in 1869, and from Harvard Law School in 1871. He was admitted to the bar in 1872 and commenced practice in New York City with residence in Brooklyn.

== Political career ==
He was a member of the New York State Assembly (Kings Co., 11th D.) in 1882 and 1883, and was Speaker in 1883. On January 13, 1882, he was injured in the same train accident in which State Senator Webster Wagner was killed.

He was New York State Comptroller from 1884 to 1887, elected at the New York state election, 1883 and the New York state election, 1885.

He was Mayor of Brooklyn from 1888 to 1891.

=== Tenure in Congress ===
Chapin was elected as a Democrat to the 52nd United States Congress to fill the vacancy caused by the resignation of David A. Boody and served from November 3, 1891, to November 16, 1892, when he resigned.

== Later life ==
Chapin served as railroad commissioner of New York State from 1892 to 1897, and continued the practice of law. He was also financially interested in various enterprises. He also owned a summer home in Murray Bay, Quebec.

== Personal life ==
On February 20, 1884, Chapin was married to Grace Stebbins (1860–1908). She was the daughter of Alice Holmes Schieffelin (1838–1913) and Russell Stebbins (1835–1894) and the granddaughter of Samuel Schieffelin, a religious author and businessman. Together, they were the parents of:

- Grace Chapin (1885–1960), who married Hamilton Fish III (1888–1991), a member of the U.S. House of Representatives.
- Beatrice Chapin (1889–1932)

After his first wife's death in 1908, he remarried to Charlotte (née Storrs) Montant (1860–1942), the widow of Charles Montant, on January 6, 1913.

Chapin died in the Ritz-Carlton Hotel while on a visit in Montreal, Quebec, Canada in 1936. Chapin's grandson Hamilton Fish IV also was a U.S. Representative from New York.

New York State Assembly
Preceded by William H. Waring	New York State Assembly; Kings County, 11th District; 1882–1883	Succeeded by Henry Heath
Political offices
Preceded by Charles E. Patterson	Speaker of the New York State Assembly; 1883	Succeeded by Titus Sheard
Preceded by Ira Davenport	New York State Comptroller; 1884–1887	Succeeded by Edward Wemple
Preceded by Daniel D. Whitney	Mayor of Brooklyn; 1888–1891	Succeeded by David A. Boody
U.S. House of Representatives
Preceded by David A. Boody	Member of the U.S. House of Representatives from New York's 2nd congressional district 1891–1892	Succeeded by John M. Clancy
