= Archibald M. Bliss =

American politician

Archibald Meserole Bliss
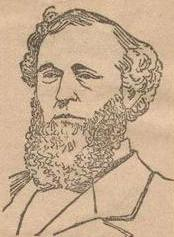

Member of the U.S. House of Representatives from New York
- In office March 4, 1885 – March 3, 1889
- Preceded by: Nicholas Muller
- Succeeded by: Thomas F. Magner
- Constituency: 5th district
- In office March 4, 1875 – March 3, 1883
- Preceded by: Philip S. Crooke
- Succeeded by: Felix Campbell
- Constituency: 4th district

Personal details
- Born: January 25, 1838 New York City, US
- Died: March 19, 1923 (aged 85) Washington, D.C., US
- Party: Democratic Party
- Spouse: Marie E. Meserole Bliss
- Profession: merchant; politician

Archibald Meserole Bliss (January 25, 1838 – March 19, 1923) was an American politician who served six terms as a member of the United States House of Representatives from New York from 1875 to 1883, and from 1885 to 1889.

== Biography ==
Bliss was born in Brooklyn, New York City and attended the common schools. He married Marie E. Meserale and they had two children.

== Career ==
Between 1864 and 1867, Bliss was an alderman of Brooklyn and served as president of the board of aldermen in 1866. In 1867, he was unsuccessful in his candidacy for mayor, which he ran on the Republican ticket.

Bliss was a delegate to the Republican National Conventions of 1864 and 1868. He was a delegate to the Liberal Republican National Convention in 1872, and to the Democratic National Convention of 1876, 1880, 1884, and 1888. He was a member of the board of water commissioners of Brooklyn in 1871 and 1872. From 1868 until 1878, he was the president and vice-president of the Bushwick Railroad Company. He was also a Director of the New York & Long Island Bridge Company.

=== Tenure in Congress ===
Elected as a Democrat, Bliss was a United States representative for the fourth district of New York in the forty-fourth Congress and was re-elected three times, serving from March 4, 1875, to March 3, 1883. He did not stand in 1882 but was elected to the forty-ninth and fiftieth Congresses for the fifth district of New York and served from March 4, 1885, to March 3, 1889. He did not run in 1888.

While in Congress Bliss served as chairman on the Committee on Pensions. From 1889 until his death, he carried on a real estate business in Washington D. C.

== Death ==
Bliss died in Washington, D.C., on March 19, 1923. He is interred at Cypress Hills Cemetery, Brooklyn, New York.

U.S. House of Representatives
Preceded by Philip S. Crooke	Member of the U.S. House of Representatives from New York's 4th congressional district March 4, 1875 – March 3, 1883	Succeeded by Felix Campbell
Preceded by Nicholas Muller	Member of the U.S. House of Representatives from New York's 5th congressional district March 4, 1885 – March 3, 1889	Succeeded by Thomas F. Magner
