= Peter P. Mahoney =

American politician

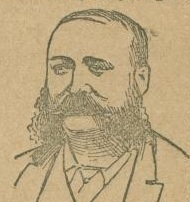

Member of the U.S. House of Representatives from New York's 4th district
- In office March 4, 1885 – March 3, 1889
- Preceded by: Felix Campbell
- Succeeded by: John M. Clancy

Personal details
- Born: June 25, 1848 New York, New York, US
- Died: March 27, 1889 (aged 40) Washington, D.C., US
- Resting place: Calvary Cemetery, Long Island City

Peter Paul Mahoney (June 25, 1848 – March 27, 1889), of Brooklyn, New York, was an American businessman and politician who served two terms as a U.S. representative from New York from 1885 to 1889. He was a Democrat.

== Biography ==
Mahoney was born in New York City and educated in the public schools there. He engaged in the dry-goods business for several years; moved to Brooklyn, New York, and engaged in the sale of liquor.

=== Congress ===
He was elected as a Democrat to the Forty-ninth and Fiftieth Congresses (March 4, 1885 - March 3, 1889); was not a candidate in 1888 for reelection to the Fifty-first Congress.

=== Death ===
He became ill while attending the inauguration ceremonies of President Benjamin Harrison March 4, 1889, and died in Washington, D.C., March 27, 1889 at the age of 40. He is interred in Calvary Cemetery, Long Island City, Queens County, New York.

U.S. House of Representatives
Preceded by Felix Campbell	Member of the U.S. House of Representatives from New York's 4th congressional district March 4, 1885 – March 3, 1889	Succeeded by John Michael Clancy
