= Forest Park (Queens) =

Public park in Queens, New York

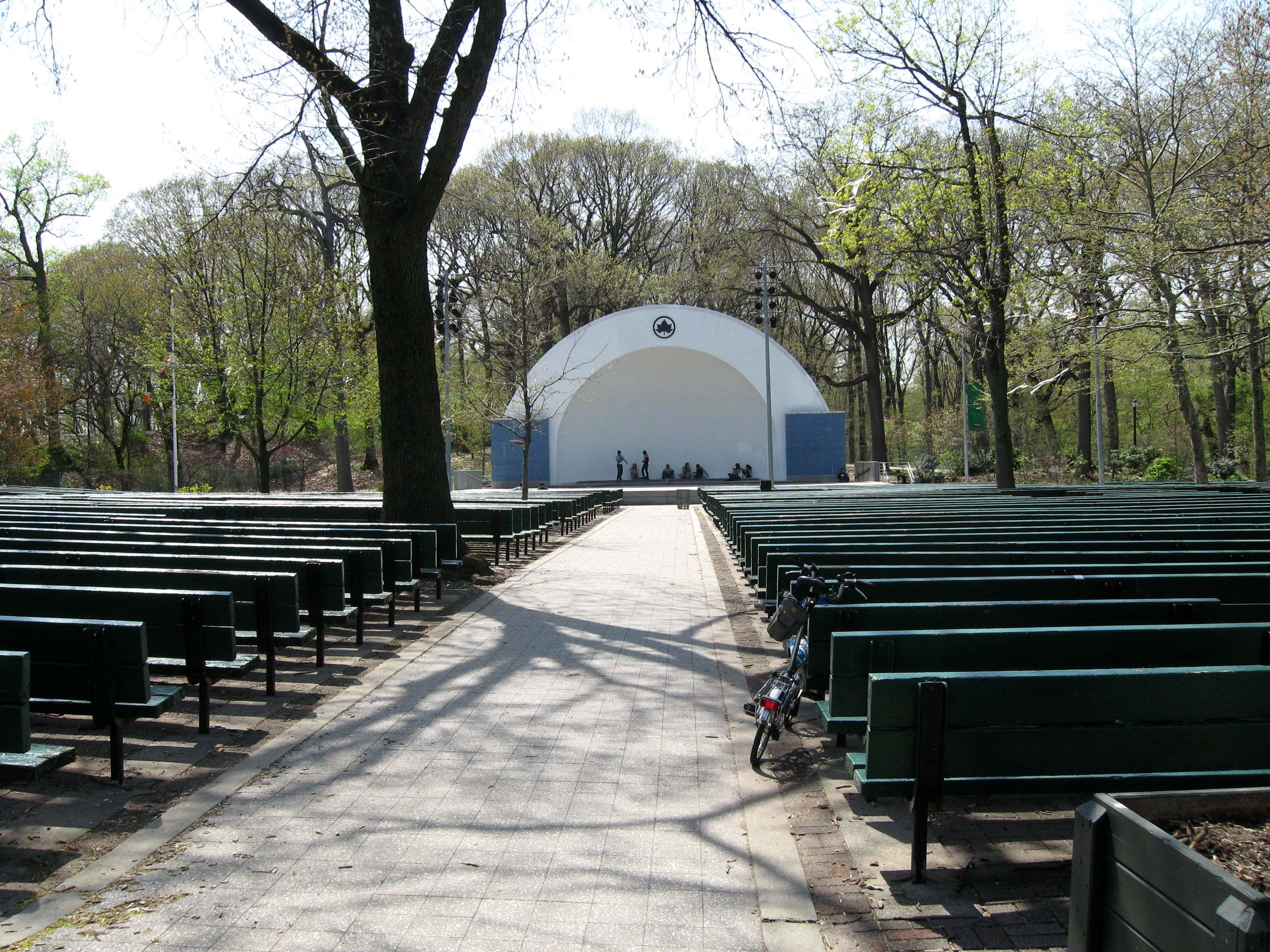
- George Seuffert Sr. Bandshell
- Interactive map of Forest Park
- Type: Urban park
- Location: Queens, New York, U.S.
- Coordinates: 40.70415°N 73.8458°W
- Area: 543 acres (2.20 km^{2})
- Created: 1895
- Owner: New York City Department of Parks and Recreation
- Status: Open all year
- Website: https://www.nycgovparks.org/parks/Q015

Forest Park is a park in the New York City borough of Queens. Spanning 543 acres (220 ha), it is the tenth-largest park in New York City and the third-largest in Queens. Acquired between 1895 and 1898, it was originally referred to as Brooklyn Forest Park, since the original owner was the then-independent city of Brooklyn.

The park contains a 165-acre (67 ha) forest. It sits on hills left behind by the Wisconsin glacier and is a haven for native plants and wildlife in the midst of the city's sprawl. In addition to the park's large full-time bird population, migratory birds pass through in the spring and fall.

Several trails are available for area residents and urban day hikers. Other facilities include playgrounds, a carousel, a running track, two dog runs, a pond, tennis courts, basketball courts, baseball fields, a skate park, and a golf course. The park is operated and maintained by the New York City Department of Parks and Recreation.

== History ==
Approximately 20,000 years ago, the terminal moraine of the receding Wisconsin Glacier that formed Long Island, known as the Harbor Hill Moraine, established a string of hills and kettles through the center of Long Island. The site of Forest Park was part of the ancestral lands of several Native American tribes, specifically the Rockaway, Lenape, and Delaware. The site was settled by Europeans in 1635 when the Dutch West India Company claimed the land. For the next two and a half centuries, the site was occupied by several private landowners.

=== Development ===
==== Planning ====
The development of Forest Park dates to the early 1890s, before the City of Greater New York was created. At the time, the city of Brooklyn and the various towns in Queens County were not yet part of New York City. In early 1892, New York state legislators introduced a bill to create one or more new parks in Kings County (where the city of Brooklyn was located). That May, the New York State Legislature passed Chapter 461 of the Laws of 1892, which authorized the city of Brooklyn to identify sites for new parks. The legislation empowered the Brooklyn government to appoint a commissioner to "select and locate parks in the County of Kings, or adjacent thereto".

James S. T. Stranahan, the onetime president of the Brooklyn Board of Park Commissioners, originally envisioned one large park extending eastward to Jamaica, Queens, and westward to Park Slope, Brooklyn. However, Brooklyn's rapid development made this impossible; the largest remnants of this proposed landscape are Forest Park and the 526-acre (213 ha) Prospect Park in Brooklyn. In conjunction with the park's development, there were also plans to extend Eastern Parkway from central Brooklyn to Highland Park and Forest Park. Although the extension of Eastern Parkway was constructed as far as Highland Park, the section between Highland and Forest parks was not completed because Cypress Hills Cemetery officials would not allow a roadway to be constructed directly across their land.

Brooklyn mayor Charles A. Schieren appointed a committee to obtain sites for new parks. At the time, there were more vacant sites available in Queens County than in Kings County. By November 1894, Brooklyn park commissioner Frank Squier had suggested issuing bonds to buy land in Queens County; a public hearing on the site was hosted the next month. Squier claimed that the new Queens park would cost one-fourth as much as Prospect Park, which had been developed a quarter-century earlier, and that it would be a park "for the poor man". Albert E. Lamb, a lawyer for the Brooklyn Parks Department, said the park was necessary because Brooklyn had very little park land per capita, compared with other cities around the world. After Frederick Law Olmsted's landscape firm Olmsted, Olmsted & Eliot published a report on possible park sites, Schieren's committee recommended in March 1895 that ten parks be developed, including a "forest park for immediate use" in Richmond Hill, Queens, east of Cypress Hills Cemetery. Only the Kings County government could allocate funds for these parks because of a law that prohibited cities in New York state from issuing large amounts of debt to pay for new parks.

==== Land acquisition ====
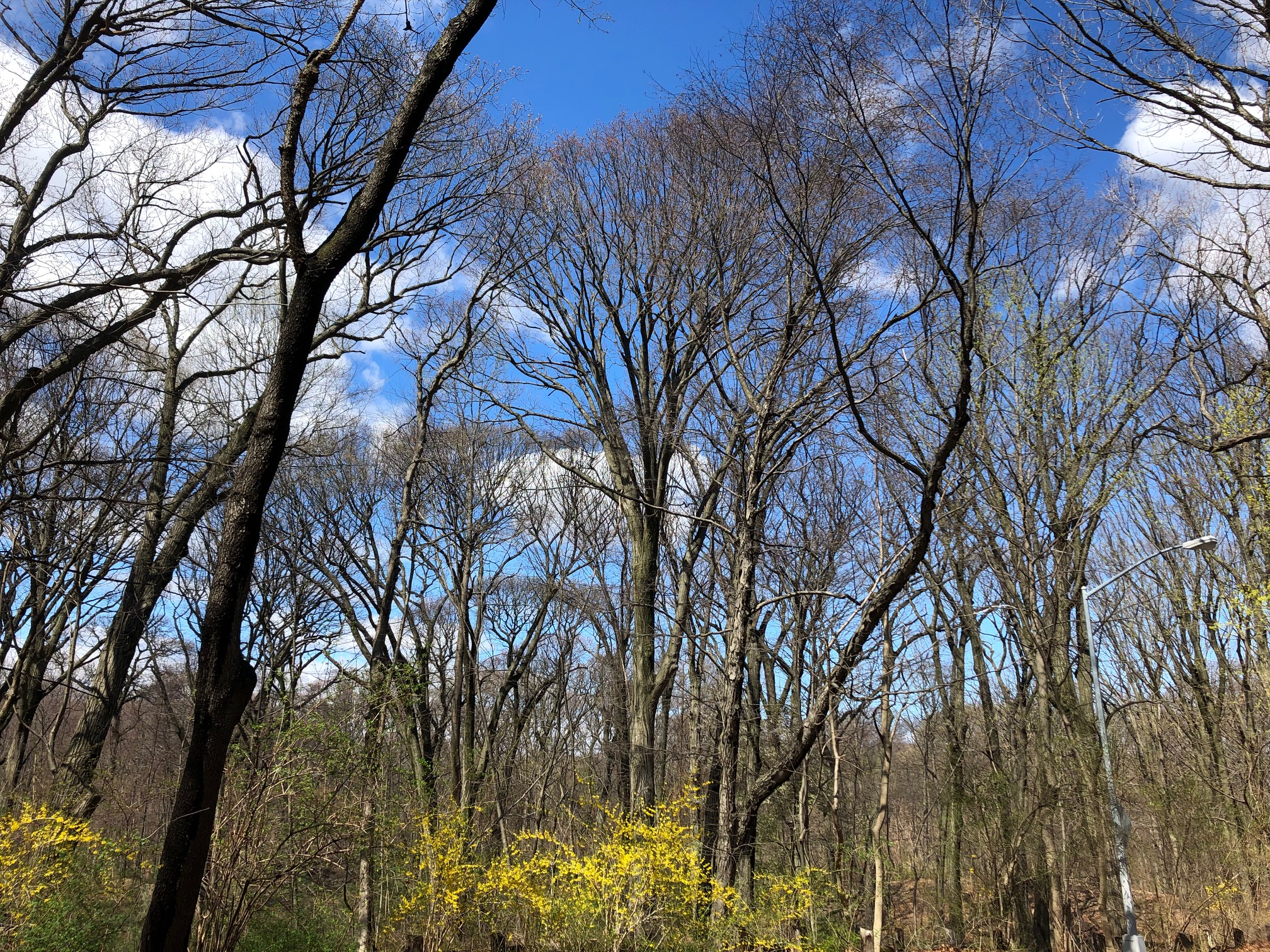
Forest Park in early spring

In May 1895, Squier submitted a report to the New York Supreme Court, calling for the establishment of four large and six small parks in and around Brooklyn; the largest of these was the 500-acre (200 ha) Forest Park at Richmond Hill. The Forest Park site was selected both because it was near Brooklyn's Eastern District and because it was a forested plateau. At the time, the park's site belonged to either about 60 or more than 100 landowners. One lawyer, Sidney V. Lowell, asked the Supreme Court not to approve the Forest Park site, claiming that the site was unsuitable for park use because it was too close to Brooklyn and Queens' Cemetery Belt. Nonetheless, Supreme Court justice Charles F. Brown approved the report that June, allowing the Kings County treasurer to allocate funds to buy these sites. The Brooklyn Times-Union estimated that it would cost about $1,800 per acre ($4,400/ha) to acquire the parkland.

The Brooklyn Parks Department purchased the first parcel for Forest Park on August 9, 1895. A judge issued an injunction preventing further land acquisition that September after Nassau Electric Railroad president P. H. Flynn filed a lawsuit, claiming that the city of Brooklyn was overpaying for the land and that Squier had no authority to buy the land. In response, Lamb said that the site had been selected following two public hearings and that Olmsted himself had recommended the site. Flynn's partner Fred Cocheu also tried to prevent further land acquisition, claiming that the Kings County government could not legally acquire parkland, but a judge refused to grant a further injunction. Squier's and Schieren's political opponents claimed that the purchases were wasteful, since the park was far removed from the most developed parts of Brooklyn.

By mid-1896, nearly all of the land had been acquired at a cost of $1.3 million. The site had cost between $500 and $2,300 per acre ($1,200 and $5,700/ha); the most expensive sites were along Myrtle Avenue, which ran along the border of the park. The newly acquired site was served by streetcar routes that traveled directly to Jamaica, Queens, and to central Brooklyn. After the parkland was acquired, land values around the park began to increase. The land acquisition was finished in 1898, and the Brooklyn government ultimately acquired 124 parcels. The park was divided by several roads and railroads, including Metropolitan Avenue, Myrtle Avenue, Union Turnpike, Woodhaven Boulevard, and two Long Island Rail Road (LIRR) lines. After Brooklyn had been absorbed into New York City, the newly merged city's controller Bird Sim Coler alleged that the old Brooklyn city government had overpaid for some of the land.

==== Initial development ====
The Brooklyn Parks Department initially referred to the site as the Brooklyn Forest. Local media reported that the park would remain in its natural state "for some time", except for a roadway winding through the park. In 1895–1896, the landscaping firm of Olmsted, Olmsted & Eliot was hired to design a curved roadway for the park and to conduct surveys of the park. The early plans called for a road connecting two of the park's entrances at Jamaica Avenue to the south and Myrtle Avenue to the north, as well as a road traversing the park from west to east. A bridge was built in mid-1895, carrying the road across the LIRR's Main Line at the park's eastern end. To accommodate the road, the Parks Department had to fill in several valleys with up to 15 or 20 feet (4.6 or 6.1 m) of dirt. The Parks Department also awarded a contract for a metal fence surrounding the park, and the sidewalk on Myrtle Avenue was widened as well. Little other work occurred during 1896, except for some clearing and pruning of vegetation. The Union Land and Improvement Company donated an 80-foot-wide (24 m) strip of land to the Parks Department, allowing the city of Brooklyn to construct a road from Jamaica Avenue to the park.

During the park's development, existing residential buildings were auctioned, disassembled, and removed. The Brooklyn Parks Department planned two additional bridges across the LIRR's Rockaway Beach Branch and Myrtle Avenue, though contracts for these bridges were not awarded until early 1897. Contractors also built a fourth bridge to carry the road across a ravine, and the Parks Department spent $30,000 to convert a former insane asylum next to the park into an inn. J. G. Dettmer, who gave Brooklyn mayor Frederick W. Wurster a tour of the park the same year, observed that the park had "splendid" views but that the roads were still incomplete. There were also proposals to add a 250,000,000-U.S.-gallon (950,000,000 L) reservoir in the park to supply Brooklyn with fresh water, as well as a suggestion to convert Forest Park into a military campground.

=== 20th century ===
A nine-hole golf course opened in 1901. The golf course was extremely popular, and so a clubhouse and another nine holes were added in 1905. A carousel at Forest Park was likely built in 1916, although the exact date of the carousel's opening is not clear. In 1919, a group of trees was planted near the park's golf clubhouse. When Woodhaven Boulevard was widened in the 1930s or 1940s, the former American Legion building within the park was torn down.

The carousel was destroyed in a fire on December 10, 1966; it was replaced by the current Forest Park Carousel, which opened in 1973. Jackson Pond was used for fishing and ice skating, but was infilled in 1966 to make way for a playground. During the park's centennial celebration in 1995, a hundred trees were planted as a part of Operation Pine Grove, funded by American Forests and the Texaco Global Re-leaf Program.

=== 21st century ===
The Forest Park Carousel was listed on the National Register of Historic Places in 2004. The Forest Park Greenhouse reopened in 2012 after it was renovated at a cost of $3.8 million. The same year, some of the park's trees were destroyed in Hurricane Sandy and one fallen tree damaged the structure housing the Forest Park Carousel, although the carousel itself was not damaged. The hurricane also damaged the tropical section of the Forest Park Greenhouse, which was renovated in 2015 for another $1.5 million. Other parts of the park, including the Mary Whalen Playground and some sidewalks, were also renovated in the mid-2010s.

Freedom Drive, within the park, was closed in 2020 due to the COVID-19 pandemic; the local Queens Community Board 9 voted in 2025 to recommend that the drive be reopened. The drive reopened in December 2025, but after Zohran Mamdani became mayor in 2026, other local residents asked his administration to close Freedom Drive again.

== Description and features ==
Forest Park is the third-largest park in Queens, covering 543 acres (220 ha) in central Queens. (Note: Some sources give a different figure of 538 acres (218 ha).) Woodhaven Boulevard runs north–south through the park, dividing it into western and eastern sections. The western half includes several structures and recreational fields, while the eastern half consists largely of woodland. Jackie Robinson Parkway also runs through the park from west to east. As built, there is a central driveway running along the Harbor Hill Moraine (which passes through the park), connecting the western end of the park to the Long Island Rail Road's Main Line at its eastern end.

Forest Park measures 2.5 miles (4.0 km) long from west to east. Its narrowest point is at Woodhaven Boulevard, where it is only 1,000 feet (300 m) wide because the park originally surrounded a water-supply structure on three sides. Other parts of the park are up to 0.5 miles (2,600 ft; 800 m) wide. West of the former Rockaway Beach Branch (which runs just east of Woodhaven Boulevard), the northern boundary of the park is at Myrtle Avenue. East of the Rockaway Beach Branch, Myrtle Avenue crosses southeastward into the park, and Union Turnpike is the park's northern boundary. The southern and eastern boundaries of Forest Park are formed by Park Lane South, while the western boundary is at Cypress Hills Cemetery.

=== Structures ===
Within Forest Park is the Overlook, the administration building for NYC Parks' properties in Queens. It is located in the far eastern end of the park near Park Lane and 80th Road. Originally a one-room structure, the Overlook has six rooms in the basement and eight rooms on the first story. This structure was designed in the Mission Revival style by Birchman & Fox and was completed in 1912. The Overlook was further expanded in 1915.

At the southwestern corner of the park, at the intersection of Forest Parkway and Forest Park Drive, is Oak Ridge. The structure, formerly a golf-course clubhouse, is the administration building for Forest Park. It was designed in the Dutch Colonial Revival style by the firm of Helmle, Huberty & Hudswell (who also designed the Williamsburgh Savings Bank Tower). As originally built, Oak Ridge had locker rooms, baths, and showers, and it led directly to the first hole of the park's golf course. When the first four holes of the golf course were relocated northward in the 1920s, a new clubhouse was erected at Myrtle Avenue and 80th Street. Oak Ridge became an administration building for the New York City Department of Parks and Recreation (NYC Parks).

There is also a greenhouse behind the Seuffert Bandshell. Known as the Forest Park Greenhouse, it was built by Lord & Burnham and constructed in either 1905 or 1910. The greenhouse is one of three operated by NYC Parks, and it supplies up to 100,000 plants annually. The current greenhouse is composed of five structures, some of which were relocated from suburban Long Island. It is generally closed to the public, although it is open for tours once a year.

=== Recreation and events ===
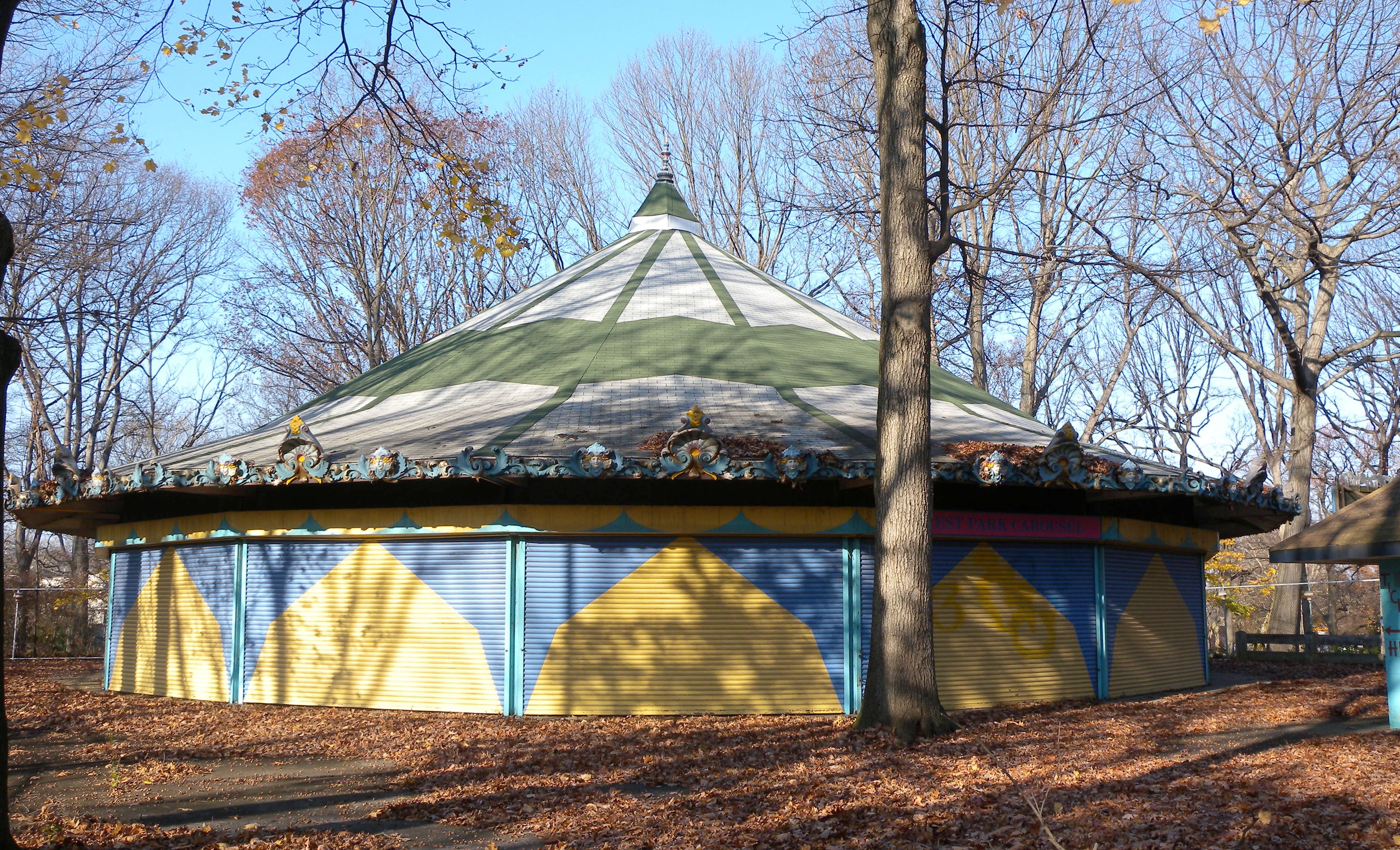
Carousel, closed for winter

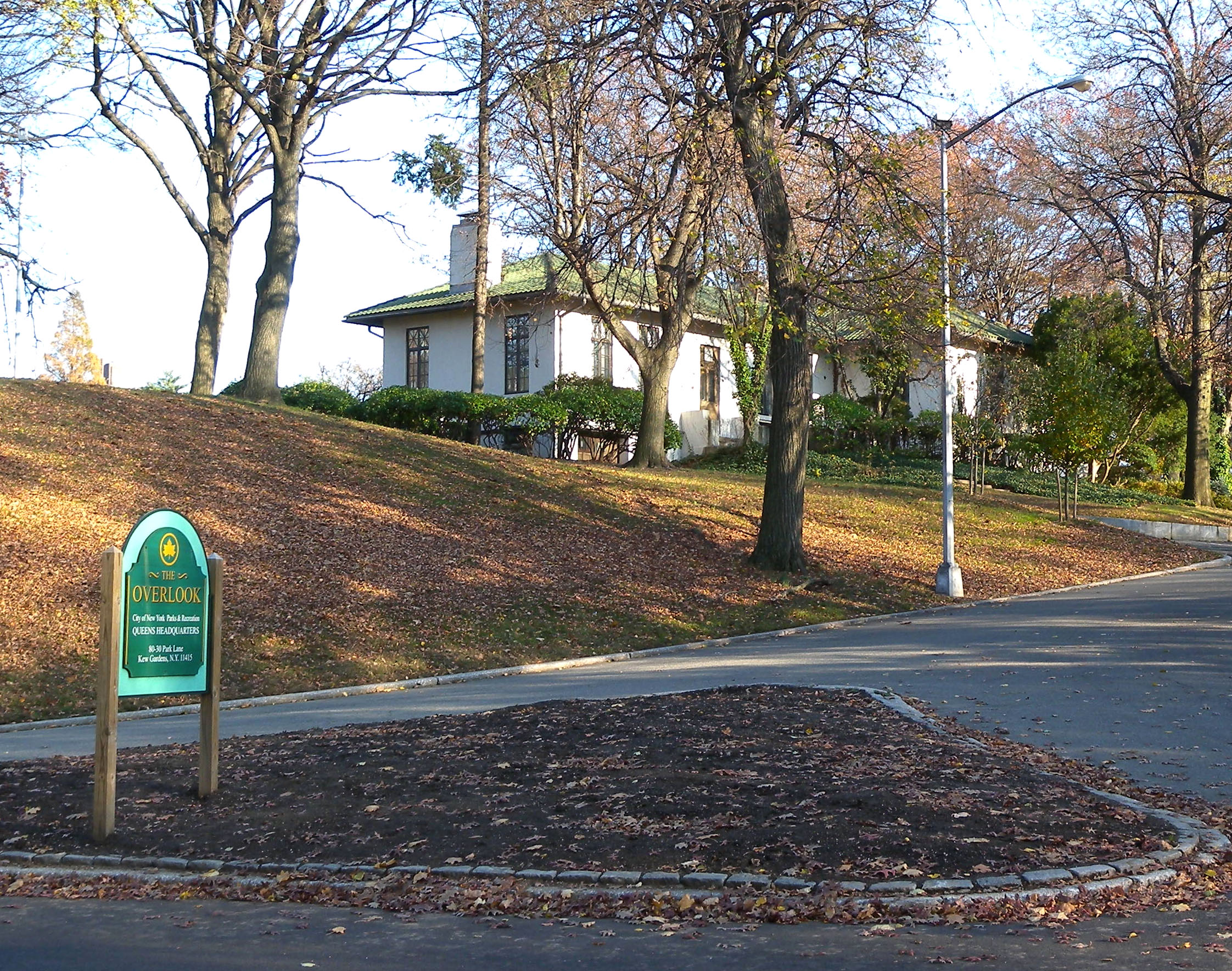
The Overlook

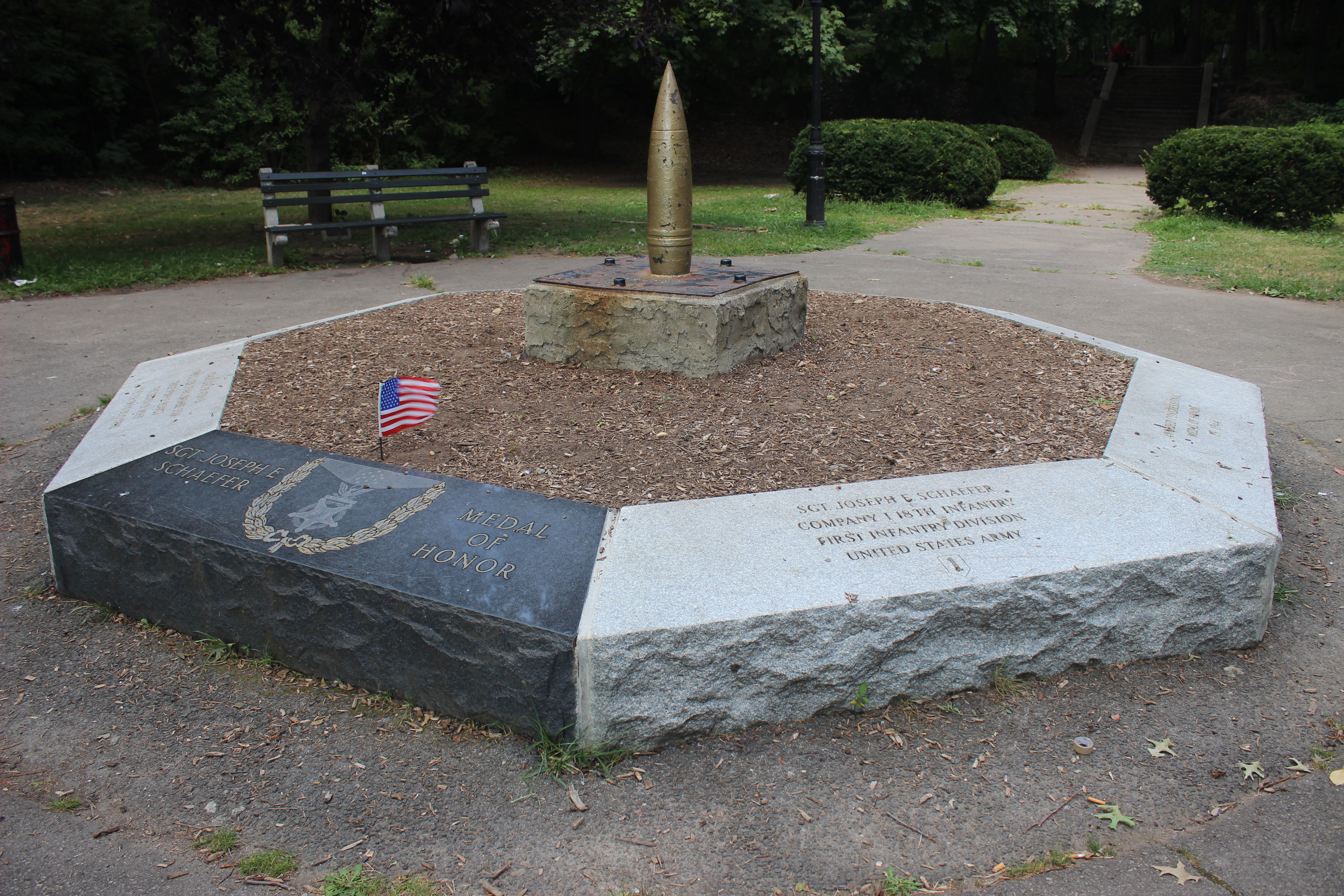
Srgt Joseph E. Schaefer Medal of Honor Memorial

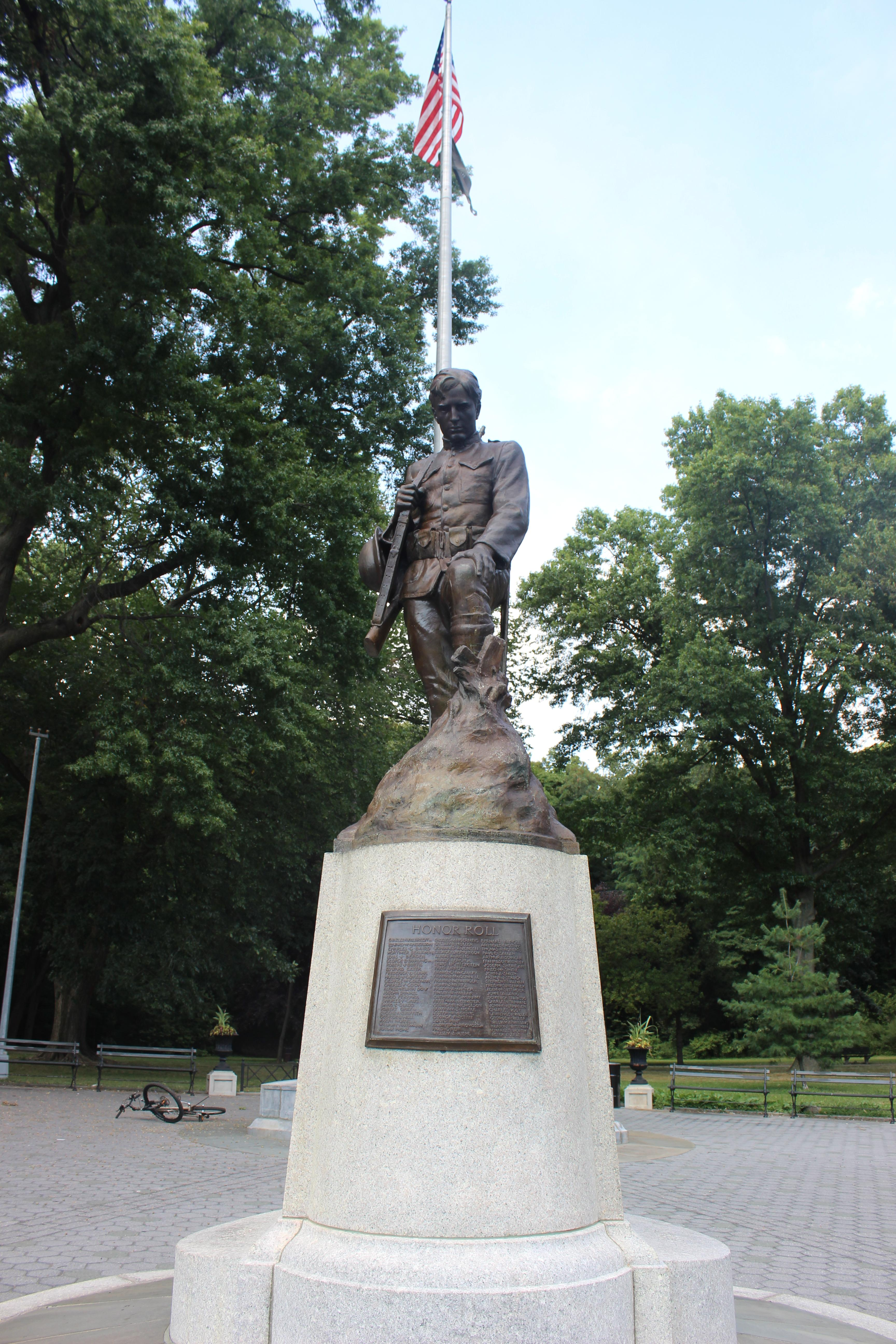
My Buddys Statue, Forest Park

Forest Park also offers a wide array of recreational facilities, the Carousel, playgrounds, a pond, a barbecue area, a nature center, and two dog runs. Dogs can run off leash here, and there is a separate area for small dogs. Therapeutic horseback riding for people with special needs is also available in the park. The park includes the George Seuffert Sr. Bandshell, which was named after a bandleader in 1979.

Annual events such as the Halloween Walk, the Victorian Christmas, Nature Trails Day, orienteering and battle re-enactments draw the participation of the surrounding neighborhoods of Kew Gardens, Woodhaven, Richmond Hill, Forest Hills, and Glendale.

=== Landscape features ===
Forest Park is situated atop the Harbor Hill Moraine, which, at the time of the park's construction, was a heavily forested ridge. The highest point in the park is about 180 feet (55 m) above sea level. The park contains approximately 411 acres (166 ha) of hickory and oak trees. These include a 165-acre (67 ha) forested section in the eastern half of the park. In addition, Forest Park contains 7 miles (11 km) of bridle paths.

When the park was established, the westernmost portion, about 200 feet (61 m) east of the western border, had a plateau measuring several hundred feet across. The park's two main roads, Forest Park Drive and Forest Parkway, intersect on this plateau. Near this intersection, across from Oak Ridge, is a grove of trees that was planted in 1919 in memory of Queens residents who had died fighting in World War I. There were originally 53 trees, but the grove was expanded over the years to 70 trees; there is a plaque nearby with the names of residents who died during the war. Until the 1930s, the Woodhaven neighborhood's annual Memorial Day parades ended outside this grove.

Forest Park originally had no waterways and only two small bodies of water when it was established. The first, Strack Pond, is a glacial kettle pond located inside the park near Woodhaven Boulevard and Forest Park Drive. The pond, named after a local resident killed in the Vietnam War, was buried in 1966 and restored four decades later. Another kettle pond, the 1.1-acre (0.45 ha) Jackson Pond, stood at the intersection of Myrtle Avenue and Park Drive South until it was infilled in 1966. The pond was used for ice skating during the winter, and it hosted fishing, swimming, and model boat sailing during the summer.

== Sculptures and memorials ==
Forest Park has several sculptures and memorials. At the intersection of Park Lane South and Myrtle Avenue is the Joseph E. Schaefer Medal of Honor Memorial, an octagonal planting bed that was named after a Richmond Hill resident who served in World War II. The Schaefer memorial, dedicated in 1987, includes a pedestal with an artillery shell atop it. Nearby is the Richmond Hill War Memorial, sculpted by Joseph Pollia in 1925; it depicts a "doughboy" or American infantryman. This memorial is one of a few doughboy statues in New York City. The same intersection contains a bronze flagstaff manufactured by the Gorham Manufacturing Company, which is located atop a 10-foot-tall (3.0 m) pedestal and a 4-foot-tall (1.2 m) granite base. In addition, there is a plaque commemorating Corporal Robert Gray, who died in World War I.

Other sculptures are scattered around the park. Raoul Wallenberg Square, dedicated in 1982, is located at Metropolitan Avenue and Park Lane South, near the eastern end of the park. At the square is a granite marker that commemorates Raoul Wallenberg, a diplomat who saved Jewish refugees during the Holocaust. Nearby at 80th Road and Park Lane South, south of the Overlook, is the Job sculpture, a 5-foot-tall (1.5 m) bronze sculpture atop a stone pedestal. It was dedicated in 1997 and is based on a sculpture that Nathan Rapoport created in 1968 for the 20th anniversary of the Israeli Declaration of Independence.

== Wildlife and vegetation ==
Birds common to Forest Park include red-tailed hawks, a variety of woodpeckers, great blue herons, mallards, northern orioles, American kestrels, ruby throated hummingbirds, ring-necked pheasants, northern flickers, eastern wood pewees, tufted titmice, white-breasted nuthatches, wood thrushes, red-eyed vireos, red-winged blackbirds, scarlet tanagers, and several species of sparrow including rufous-sided towhees. A great variety of warblers often pass through in the spring. According to the New York City Parks Department, more than 100 species of migratory birds visit the park each year.

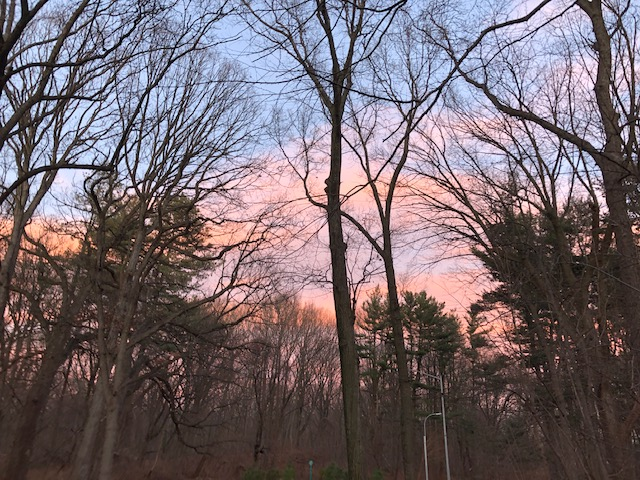
Forest Park sunset in winter

Chipmunks become visibly active in spring, along with the squirrels, raccoons, and skunks that are more often seen year-round. Turtles sun themselves in Strack Pond on warm days. On summer nights, cicada song fills the area and surrounding neighborhoods. Toads also can be heard croaking in the evenings. In mid-summer, hatching butterflies begin to gravitate to the Joe Pye Weed, dogbane, milkweed, thistle, and other native plants. Fall brings spectacular color, as many varieties of trees prepare to drop their leaves. Several species of hawks pass through. Winter is quiet, featuring the occasional tracks of small mammals in snow.

Forest Park's trees include the Northern red oak (Quercus rubra), Scarlet oak (Quercus coccinea), Tulip tree (Liriodendron tulipifera), Shagbark hickory (Carya ovata), White oak (Quercus alba), American beech (Fagus grandifolia), American sweetgum (Liquidambar styraciflua), and Black cherry (Prunus serotina). Several trees in the park are more than 150 years old, and create a canopy with an under-layer of Dogwood (Cornus), Virginia creeper (Parthenocissus quinquefolia), Sassafras (Sassafras albidum), and Corktree (Genus Phellodendron). Wildflowers such as white wood aster cover the forest floor in spring, as the azaleas, dogwoods, forsythia, and other flowering plants begin to bloom.

The park was ravaged in 1912 by the chestnut blight, and for a time was used for lumbering; about the same time, greenhouses were set up to grow plants for parks throughout the city. These have since been moved to the Brooklyn Botanic Garden and Bronx Park.

== Transportation ==
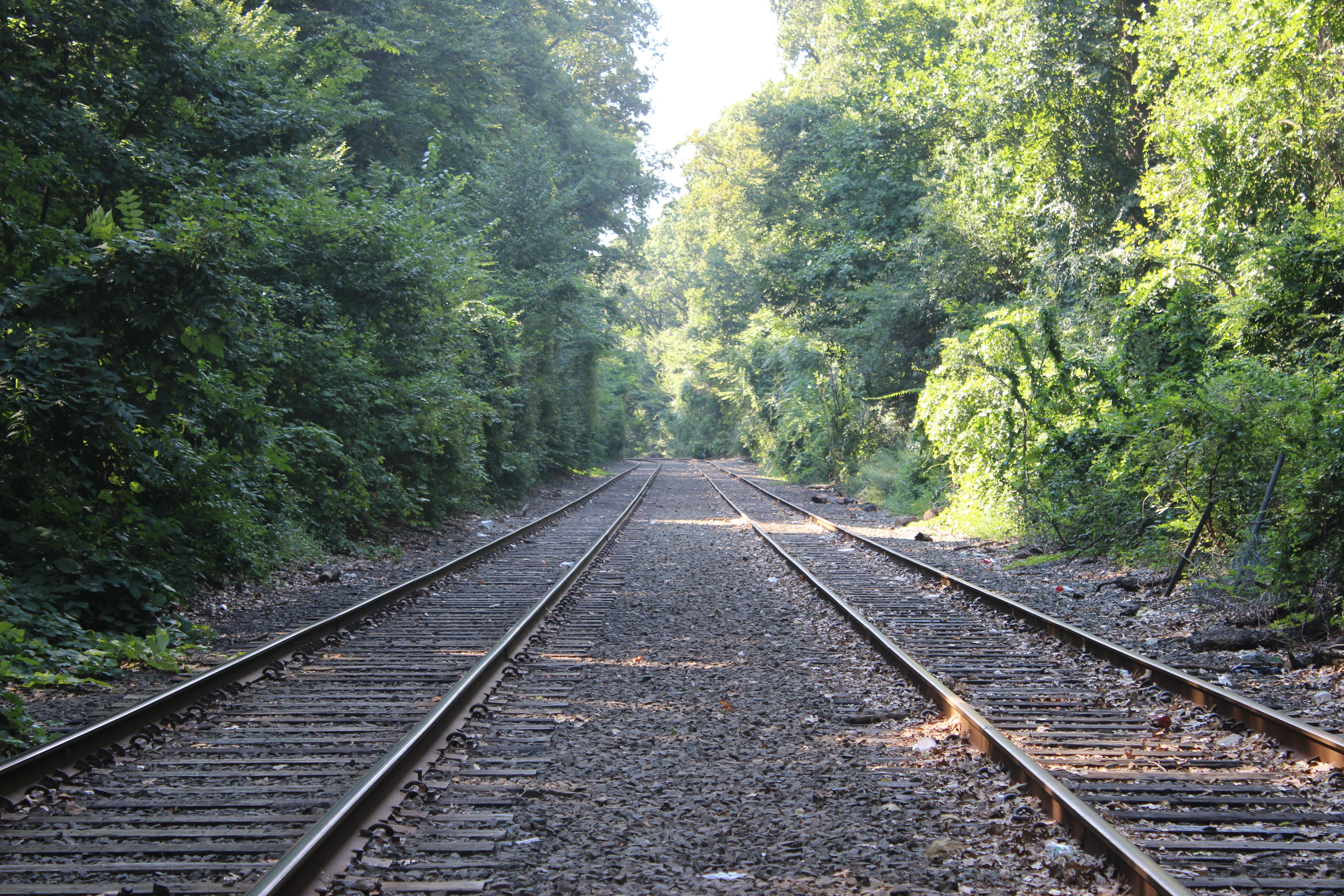
Montauk Branch railroad tracks in the park

Forest Park is accessible by the New York City Subway's Queens Boulevard Line (E, F, and <F> trains) at Kew Gardens–Union Turnpike. The southern part of the park is accessible via the Jamaica Line (J and Z trains) at 75th Street–Elderts Lane, 85th Street–Forest Parkway, and Woodhaven Boulevard. The Q56 bus runs just south of the park along Jamaica Avenue and the Q11, Q52 SBS, and Q53 SBS routes run along Woodhaven Boulevard. The Q37 runs along Park Lane South in Kew Gardens and Richmond Hill, the Q54 runs in the northeastern section of the park on Metropolitan Avenue, while the Q55 bus is straddled by the park along Myrtle Avenue.

Two lines of the Long Island Rail Road, the Montauk Branch and the Rockaway Beach Branch, had run through the land before Forest Park was acquired. The Rockaway Beach Branch has been abandoned since 1962, but the Montauk Branch is still used by freight trains. In the 1970s—as part of a Program for Action, which proposed a rail link to John F. Kennedy International Airport—there was a proposal to connect a tunnel within the park to link the two railroad branches. Local officials and residents were strongly opposed to the tunnel, which was canceled in 1976.

The Brooklyn-Queens Greenway bike path also runs through Forest Park, connecting westward to Ridgewood Reservoir and eastward to Kew Gardens.

== See also ==
- List of parks in New York City
