= Philip S. Crooke =

American politician

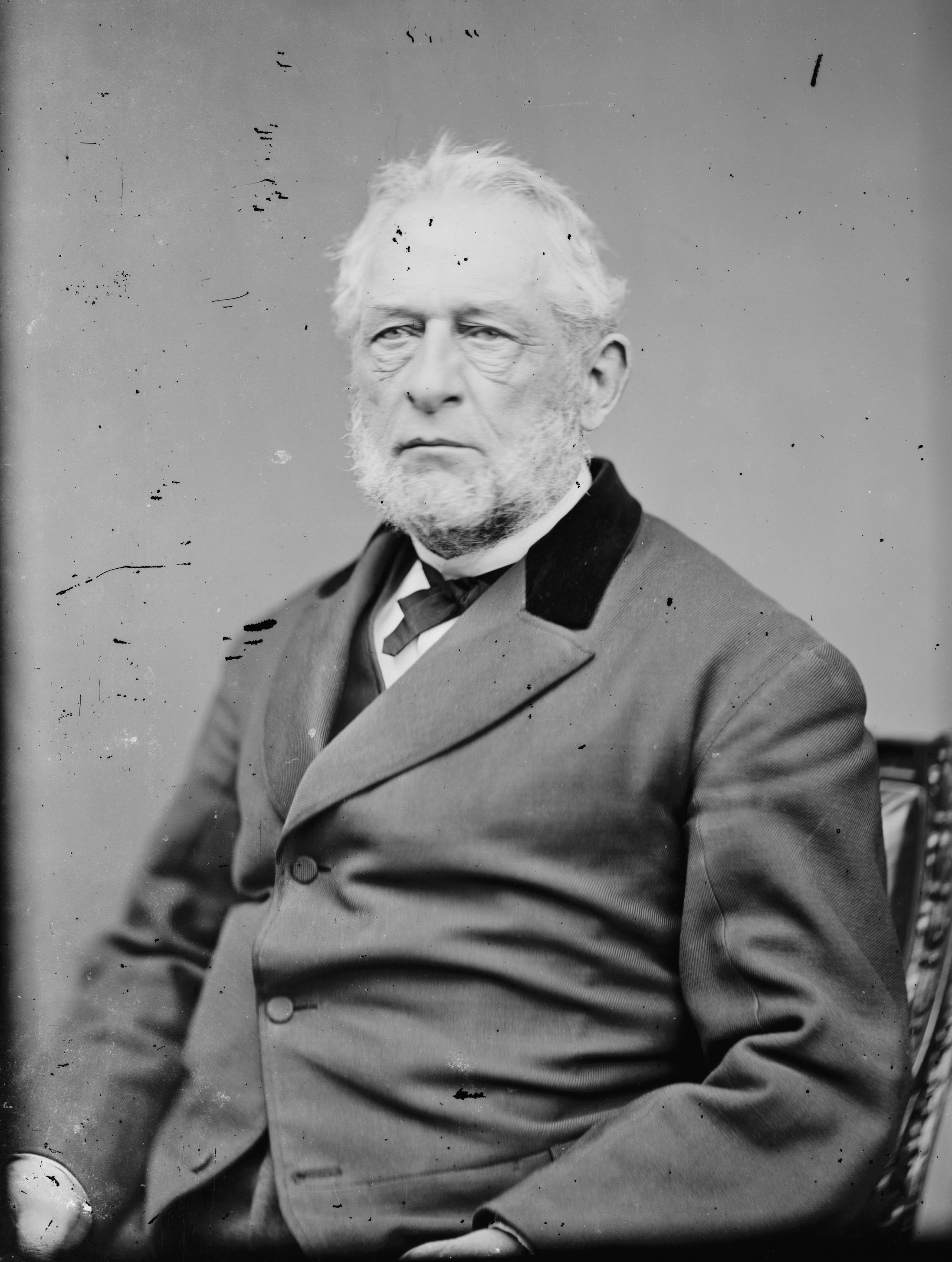

Member of the U.S. House of Representatives from New York's 4th district
- In office March 4, 1873 – March 3, 1875
- Preceded by: Robert Roosevelt
- Succeeded by: Archibald M. Bliss

Member of the New York State Assembly from the 1st district
- In office 1864

Personal details
- Born: Philip Schuyler Crooke; March 2, 1810 Poughkeepsie, New York
- Died: March 17, 1881 (aged 71) Flatbush, Brooklyn, New York
- Party: Republican
- Occupation: Lawyer

Military service
- Allegiance: New York
- Branch/service: National Guard of the State of New York
- Rank: Brigadier general
- Battles/wars: American Civil War

Philip Schuyler Crooke (March 2, 1810 – March 17, 1881) was a United States representative from New York.

Born in Poughkeepsie, he graduated from Dutchess Academy, studied law, was admitted to the bar in 1831, and commenced practice in Brooklyn. He moved to Flatbush in 1838 and was a member of the Board of Supervisors of Kings County from 1844 to 1852, and from 1858 to 1870, and chairman of the board in 1861, 1862, 1864 and 1865. He was a presidential elector in 1852, voting for Franklin Pierce and William R. King; and was a Republican Union member of the New York State Assembly (Kings Co., 1st D.) in 1864.

== Military service ==
He served forty years in the National Guard of the State of New York, from private to brigadier general.

During the Civil War, Crooke commanded the Fifth Brigade, National Guard. He led his force into Pennsylvania in June and July 1863 during the "Emergency of 1863". Crooke's troops served on the Department of the Susquehanna under Maj. Gen. Darius Couch, and helped man the defenses of Harrisburg against a threatened attack by Confederates under Lt. Gen. Richard S. Ewell. When the Confederates retired to Virginia following the Battle of Gettysburg, Crooke and his men returned to New York for the duration of the war.

== Residence ==
Crooke lived in the historic Jans Martense Schenck house in the Flatlands section of Brooklyn. The house was inherited by his wife. The house came to be known as the "Martense-Crooke house". The original 2 room portion of the home was rebuilt in the Brooklyn Museum.

== Congress ==
Crooke was elected as a Republican to the 43rd United States Congress, holding office from March 4, 1873, to March 3, 1875. Afterwards he resumed the practice of law. He died in Flatbush; interment was in Green-Wood Cemetery, Brooklyn.

New York State Assembly
Preceded by Cornelius Flynn	New York State Assembly; New York County, 1st District; 1864	Succeeded by Jacob L. Smith
U.S. House of Representatives
Preceded by Robert Roosevelt	Member of the U.S. House of Representatives from New York's 4th congressional district 1873–1875	Succeeded by Archibald Meserole Bliss
