= John Michael Clancy =

American politician

John M. Clancy
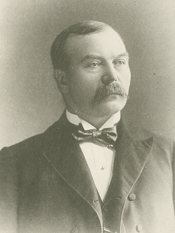

Member of the U.S. House of Representatives from New York
- In office March 4, 1889 – March 3, 1895
- Preceded by: Peter P. Mahoney
- Succeeded by: Denis M. Hurley
- Constituency: 4th district (1889–93); 2nd district (1893–95)

Member of the New York State Assembly
- In office 1878–1881
- Constituency: 1st Kings (1878–79); 4th Kings (1880–81)

Personal details
- Born: May 7, 1837 County Laois, Ireland
- Died: July 25, 1903 (aged 66) Butte, Montana
- Party: Democratic
- Occupation: real estate

John Michael Clancy (May 7, 1837 – July 25, 1903) was an American businessman and politician who served three terms as a United States representative from New York from 1889 to 1895.

== Biography ==
Born in County Laois, Ireland, he immigrated with his parents to the United States and settled in New York City. He attended the public schools of Brooklyn, engaged in the real-estate business, served as an alderman of the city of Brooklyn from 1868 to 1875, and was a member of the New York State Assembly in 1878, 1879 (both Kings Co., 1st D.), 1880 and 1881 (both Kings Co., 4th D.).

=== Tenure in Congress ===
Clancy was elected as a Democrat to the Fifty-first, Fifty-second, and Fifty-third Congresses (March 4, 1889 – March 3, 1895); he was not a candidate for renomination in 1894.

=== Later career and death ===
He then resumed the real-estate business in New York City. He was an unsuccessful candidate for election in 1896 to the Fifty-fifth Congress and died in Butte, Montana while returning from a visit to Yellowstone Park. Interment was in Holy Cross Cemetery, New York City.

New York State Assembly
Preceded by Daniel Bradley	New York State Assembly; Kings County, 1st District; 1878–1879	Succeeded by John Shanley
Preceded by Charles T. Trowbridge	New York State Assembly; Kings County, 4th District; 1880–1881	Succeeded by Daniel M. Kelly
U.S. House of Representatives
Preceded by Peter P. Mahoney	Member of the U.S. House of Representatives from New York's 4th congressional district 1889–1893	Succeeded by William J. Coombs
Preceded by Alfred C. Chapin	Member of the U.S. House of Representatives from New York's 2nd congressional district 1893–1895	Succeeded by Denis M. Hurley
