= Frederick D. Schmidt =

American politician (1932–2003)

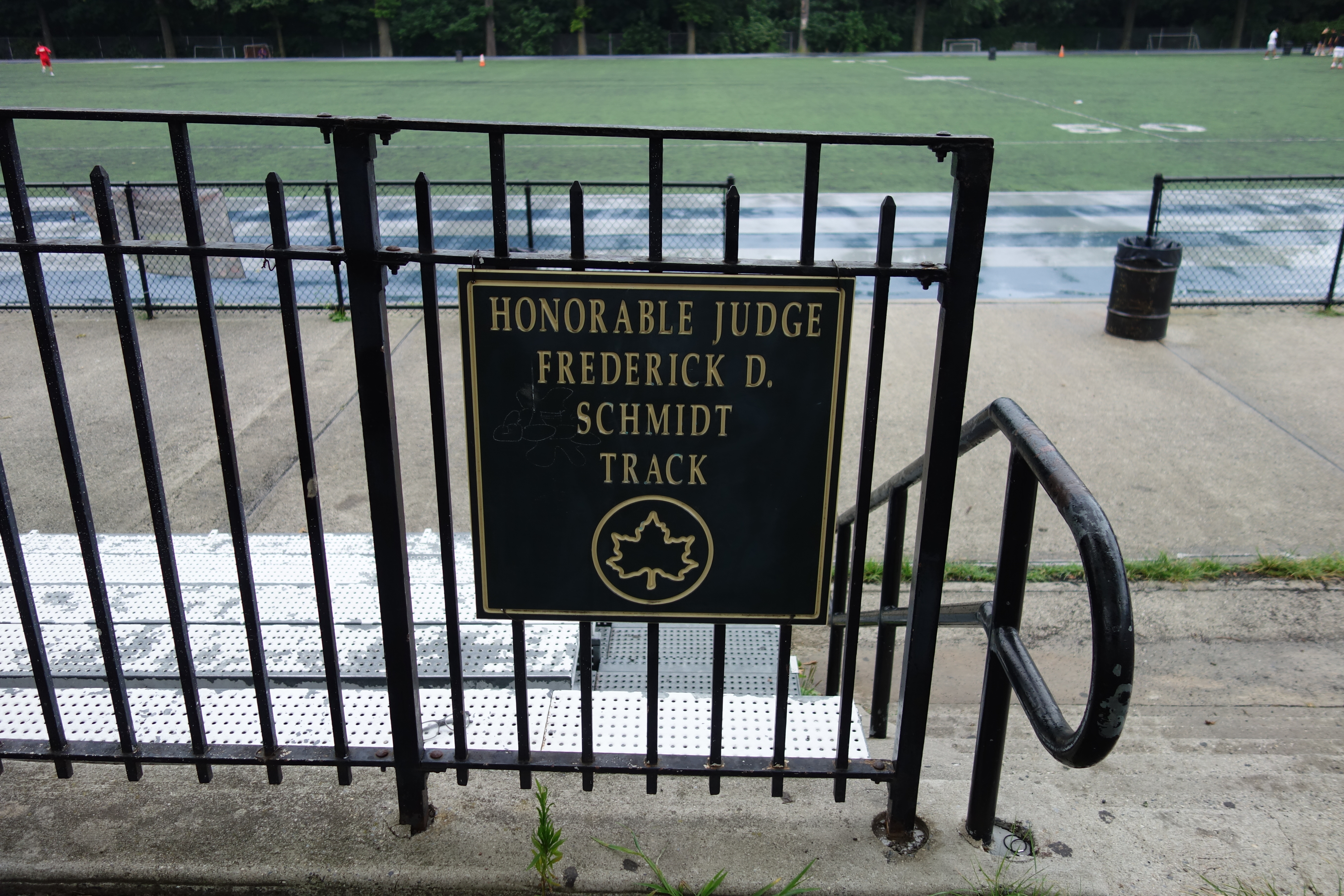
- The plaque honoring Schmidt at Victory Field in Forest Park

Member of the New York State Assembly from the 38th district
- In office January 1, 1975 – December 31, 1992
- Preceded by: Vito P. Battista
- Succeeded by: Anthony S. Seminerio

Member of the New York State Assembly from the 29th district
- In office January 1, 1967 – December 31, 1972
- Preceded by: Joseph J. Kunzeman
- Succeeded by: Guy Brewer

Member of the New York State Assembly from the 25th district
- In office January 1, 1966 – December 31, 1966
- Preceded by: District created
- Succeeded by: Moses M. Weinstein

Member of the New York State Assembly from Queens's 13th district
- In office January 1, 1965 – December 31, 1965
- Preceded by: Anthony P. Savarese Jr.
- Succeeded by: District abolished

Personal details
- Born: June 30, 1932 Queens, New York City, New York
- Died: July 18, 2003 (aged 71) Queens, New York City, New York
- Party: Democratic

Frederick D. Schmidt (June 30, 1932 – July 18, 2003) was an American politician who served in the New York State Assembly from 1965 to 1972 and from 1975 to 1992.

He died of a heart attack on July 18, 2003, in Queens, New York City, New York at age 71. The running track of Victory Field in Forest Park in Queens was named after him in 2007.
