= Denis M. Hurley =

American politician

Denis Michael Hurley
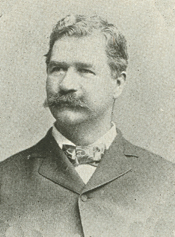

Member of the U.S. House of Representatives from New York's 2nd district
- In office March 4, 1895 – February 26, 1899
- Preceded by: John M. Clancy
- Succeeded by: John J. Fitzgerald

Personal details
- Born: March 14, 1843 Limerick, Ireland
- Died: February 26, 1899 (aged 55) Hot Springs, Virginia, U.S.
- Party: Republican

Denis Michael Hurley (March 14, 1843 - February 26, 1899) was a United States representative from New York, 1895-1899.

Hurley, a Brooklynite, was born in Limerick in County Limerick in Ireland.

Hurley was the son of Michael Hurley and Catherine Cusick, and immigrated to the United States in 1850. He had a brother named Patrick, and two sisters named Mary (the elder of whom apparently died in infancy. According to the book of eulogies delivered on the floor of the United States House of Representatives in 1899 (because Congressman Hurley died at the very end of his final term of elected office, so was commemorated publicly by his peers), he was a self-made man who rose from being a poor orphan boy to being a Congressman. Some of this persona presented to the public was a bit of political spin—Congressman Hurley was not an orphaned boy—his mother died the same year as his wife in 1889—only his father had died young, in the early 1860s. The Congressman was an early proponent of the metric system (from his days doing weights and measures on the New York City docks) and voted in favor of the America's entry into the Spanish–American War.

Hurley was elected as a Republican to the United States House of Representatives for New York's 2nd congressional district (Brooklyn) to the fifty-fourth and fifty-fifth United States Congresses, but was defeated in 1898 for reelection to the fifty-sixth congress; he served from March 4, 1895 until his death in office on February 26, 1899.

Hurley's wife, née Catherine Mortell was from Dutchess County, New York, was herself an Irish immigrant from the County Cork/County Limerick border, and was several years Mr. Hurley's senior. She died at age 50 from complications of diabetes in Brooklyn, New York, in 1889, several years before Hurley entered Congress. Their only surviving daughter, Mary Catherine, known as Minnie, acted as Hurley's hostess in Washington, D.C., and eventually married patent attorney William Nathaniel Roach Jr., son of North Dakota United States Senator William N. Roach, Sr., grandson of Dr. Charles Liebermann (one of the Washington, D.C., physicians, who attended at the deathbed of Abraham Lincoln, and apparently a co-founder of Georgetown University School of Medicine), and stepbrother of Hollywood writer Channing Pollock. Hurley, who began his working life as dockworker in New York City and who gradually made his way up to running his own dredging company, was a devout Roman Catholic, a devoted family man, and fairly florid and Victorian in his written prose style. In addition to his daughter, he had three children who died young (Catherine Hurley, and two sons both called Robert Emmet Hurley), and four surviving sons: James Edward and Denis Michael Jr., who both went into business; John Patrick, assistant District Attorney of Brooklyn, New York; and Arthur Leo, a New York State Assemblyman. The Congressman's namesake grandson, attorney Denis M. Hurley (1898–1980) was Corporation Counsel of New York City during the administration of Mayor Impellitteri in the 1950s as well as lawyer for the Roman Catholic Archdiocese of Brooklyn. The Congressman's great-nephew, Dr. George A. Sheehan (1918-1993), who was the grandson of the Congressman's sister-in-law, Margaret Mortell Sheehan, was a New Jersey cardiologist who gained fame as the author of the celebrated running book Running and Being.

Hurley died in Hot Springs, Virginia, where he had gone from Washington, D.C., to rest from the strains of ill health and from the disappointment of losing his seat in Congress in the November 1898, election. His body was transported back to Brooklyn, New York, and his funeral was front-page news in a number of the local papers in Brooklyn, including the Brooklyn Eagle. Hurley was buried with his wife, mother, aunt, cousin, and infant children in a large family grave at Holy Cross Roman Catholic Cemetery in Brooklyn, New York.

== See also ==
- List of members of the United States Congress who died in office (1790–1899)

U.S. House of Representatives
Preceded by John Michael Clancy	Member of the U.S. House of Representatives from New York's 2nd congressional district March 4, 1895 – February 26, 1899	Succeeded by John J. Fitzgerald
