= Felix Campbell =

American politician

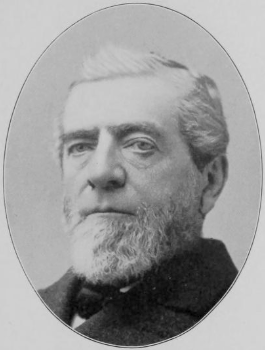

Member of the U.S. House of Representatives from New York
- In office March 4, 1883 – March 3, 1891
- Preceded by: Archibald M. Bliss
- Succeeded by: David A. Boody
- Constituency: 4th district (1883–85); 2nd district (1885–91)

Personal details
- Born: February 28, 1829 Brooklyn, New York, US
- Died: November 8, 1902 (aged 73) Brooklyn, New York, US
- Resting place: Holy Cross Cemetery

Felix Campbell (February 28, 1829 – November 8, 1902) was an American businessman and politician who served four terms as a United States representative from New York from 1883 to 1891.

== Biography ==
Born in Brooklyn, he attended the common schools and became a manufacturer of iron pipes and a consulting engineer. He was president of the board of supervisors in 1858 and was appointed by Governor Tilden a member of the board of commissioners from New York to the Centennial Exhibition at Philadelphia in 1876.

=== Congress ===
Campbell was elected as a Democrat to the Forty-eighth and to the three succeeding Congresses, holding office from March 4, 1883, to March 3, 1891.

=== Death ===
He declined to be a candidate for renomination in 1890, and died from pneumonia at his home in Brooklyn on November 8, 1902. Interment was in Holy Cross Cemetery.

U.S. House of Representatives
Preceded by Archibald M. Bliss	Member of the U.S. House of Representatives from New York's 4th congressional district 1883–1885	Succeeded by Peter P. Mahoney
Preceded by William E. Robinson	Member of the U.S. House of Representatives from New York's 2nd congressional district 1885–1891	Succeeded by David A. Boody
