= David A. Boody =

American politician (1837–1930)

David Augustus Boody
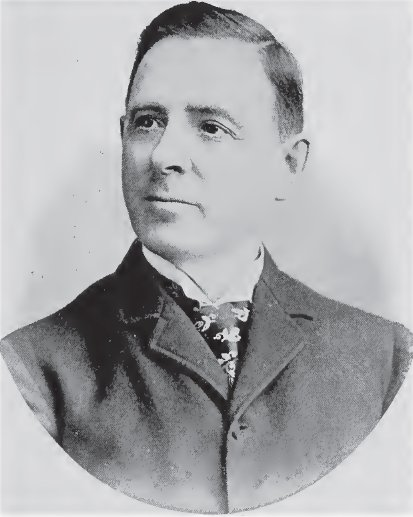

Member of the U.S. House of Representatives from New York's 2nd district
- In office March 4, 1891 – October 13, 1891
- Preceded by: Felix Campbell
- Succeeded by: Alfred C. Chapin

Personal details
- Born: August 13, 1837 Jackson, Maine
- Died: January 20, 1930 (aged 92) Brooklyn, New York
- Resting place: Green-Wood Cemetery
- Citizenship: United States
- Party: Democratic Party
- Spouse: Alice H. Treat Boody
- Profession: Attorney, banker, stockbroker, railroad president, politician

David Augustus Boody (August 13, 1837 – January 20, 1930) was an American lawyer, businessman, and politician who served briefly as a United States representative from New York in 1891.

== Biography ==
Born in a log cabin built by his father in Jackson, Maine, Boody was the son of David and Lucretia Boody, and attended the common schools and Phillips Academy (in Andover, Massachusetts). He studied law with Charles M. Brown in Bangor, Maine, was admitted to the bar in 1860 at Belfast, Maine, and commenced practice in Camden, Maine. He married Alice H. Treat.

== Career ==
Boody moved to Brooklyn, New York in 1862 and engaged in the banking and brokerage business. He was an unsuccessful candidate for election to the Forty-eighth Congress in 1882, and was a delegate to the Democratic National Conventions in 1884 and 1892. He was president of Berkeley Institute in Brooklyn from 1886 to 1922.

=== Congress ===
Elected as a Democrat to the Fifty-second Congress, Boody served as United States Representative for the second district of New York and held office from March 4, 1891 until his resignation on October 13, 1891.

=== Career after Congress ===
Boody was Mayor of the City of Brooklyn in 1892 and 1893, and resumed his former banking and brokerage business. He was President of the Louisiana and Northwestern Railway and Vice-President of the Sprague National Bank. He served as president of the board of trustees of the Brooklyn Public Library from 1897 until his death, and was a member of the New York Stock Exchange but retired in 1926.

== Death and legacy ==
Boody died in Brooklyn, Kings County, New York, on January 20, 1930 (age 92 years, 160 days). He is interred at Green-Wood Cemetery, Brooklyn, New York. David A. Boody Junior High School is named after him in Brooklyn, New York.

Brooklyn named a fireboat after Boody in 1892. The Brooklyn Fire Department and the FDNY operated her until 1914.

Political offices
U.S. House of Representatives
Preceded by Felix Campbell	Member of the U.S. House of Representatives from New York's 2nd congressional district March 4, 1891 – October 13, 1891	Succeeded by Alfred C. Chapin
Preceded by Alfred C. Chapin	Mayor of Brooklyn; 1892 – 1893	Succeeded by Charles A. Schieren
