= Charles A. Schieren =

American politician (1842–1915)

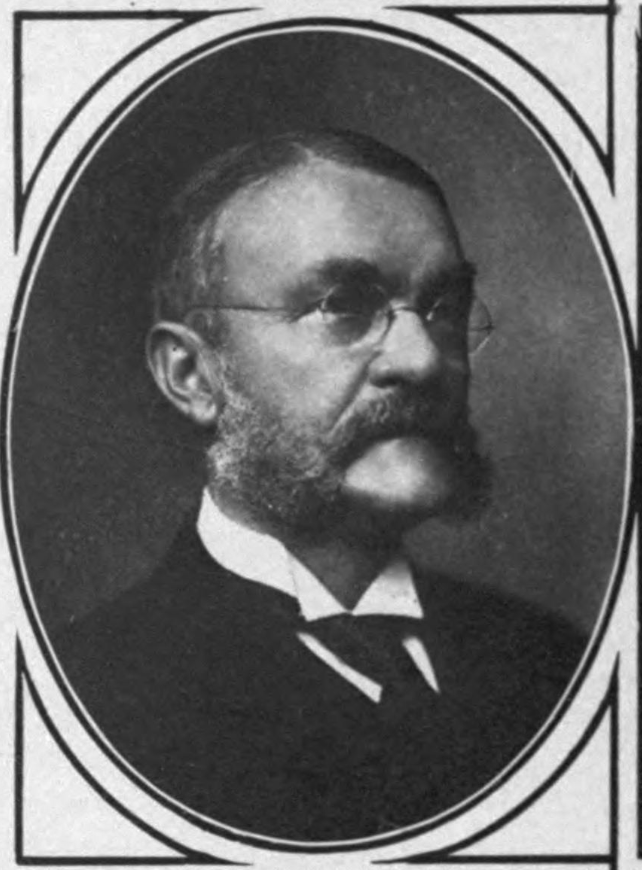

Mayor of Brooklyn
- In office 1894–1895
- Preceded by: David A. Boody
- Succeeded by: Frederick W. Wurster

Personal details
- Born: Charles Adolph Schieren; February 28, 1842 Neuss, Rhine Province, Kingdom of Prussia
- Died: March 10, 1915 (aged 73) Brooklyn, New York, United States
- Resting place: Green-Wood Cemetery
- Party: Republican
- Spouse: Marie Louise Bramm (m. 1865)
- Children: 3
- Occupation: Manufacturer, banker, politician

Charles Adolph Schieren (February 28, 1842 – March 10, 1915) was a German-American belt manufacturer, banker, and politician who served as the penultimate Mayor of Brooklyn.

== Life ==
Schieren was born on February 28, 1842, in Neuss, Rhine Province, Kingdom of Prussia. He was the son of businessman John Nikolous Schieren and Wilhelmina Langenbach. His father was an active supporter of the German Revolution of 1848, and was a close compatriot with Carl Schurz, Friedrich Hecker, and Hugo Wesendonck. After the Revolution failed, the father was forced to immigrate to America in 1849, settling in Brooklyn, New York.

In 1856, Schieren joined his father in America and settled with him in Brooklyn. He spent several years working in the cigar manufacturing business with his father. In 1864, he began working in a leather belting house under Philip F. Pasquay in New York City. When Pasquay died a year later, Schieren became the manager, a position he held for the next three years. With the money he saved during that time, he established the Charles A. Schieren Company, which in time became one of the largest tanning and belt manufacturing companies in the country. He also worked as a trustee of the Brooklyn Trust Company, a director of the Germania Life Insurance Company and the Nassau National Bank, president of the Brooklyn Academy of Music, and trustee, First Vice-president, and President of the Germania Savings Bank. He also developed several inventions related to belt manufacturing, and wrote several books on the subject.

Schieren was long a member of the Republican Party, serving as a member of the Wide Awakes that helped get Abraham Lincoln elected president in 1860. He helped reorganize the Republicans in Brooklyn in the early 1880s, and in 1893 he was elected Mayor of Brooklyn. As Mayor, he reconstructed Wallabout Market, doubled the city's park area by adding new parks, made the initial plans for the construction of Williamsburg Bridge, and advocated for the Consolidation of New York City. In 1898, President McKinley appointed him member and treasurer of the Cuban Relief Committee. Governor Black appointed him to the New York Commerce Commission, which recommended the Erie Canal be enlarged, and Governor Theodore Roosevelt appointed him a member of the Greater New York Charter Revision Committee. He was a presidential elector in the 1904 presidential election.

Schieren was a member of the English Lutheran Church, and was an active supporter of the Lutheran church in the United States. In 1865, he married Marie Louise Bramm, an active supporter of several charitable organizations. Their children were Charles A. Jr., Ida May, George Arthur, and Harrie Victor. The sons all worked in their father's company, with Charles Jr. succeeding his father as company president, George as vice-president, and Harrie as secretary and treasurer.

Schieren died at home of pneumonia on March 10, 1915. His wife was also suffering from pneumonia, and she died at home a day later. They were buried together in Green-Wood Cemetery.

Political offices
Preceded by David A. Boody	Mayor of Brooklyn; 1894–1895	Succeeded by Frederick W. Wurster
