= Christ Evangelical English Lutheran Church =

Church in Brooklyn, New York

- U.S. National Register of Historic Places
- New York State Register of Historic Places
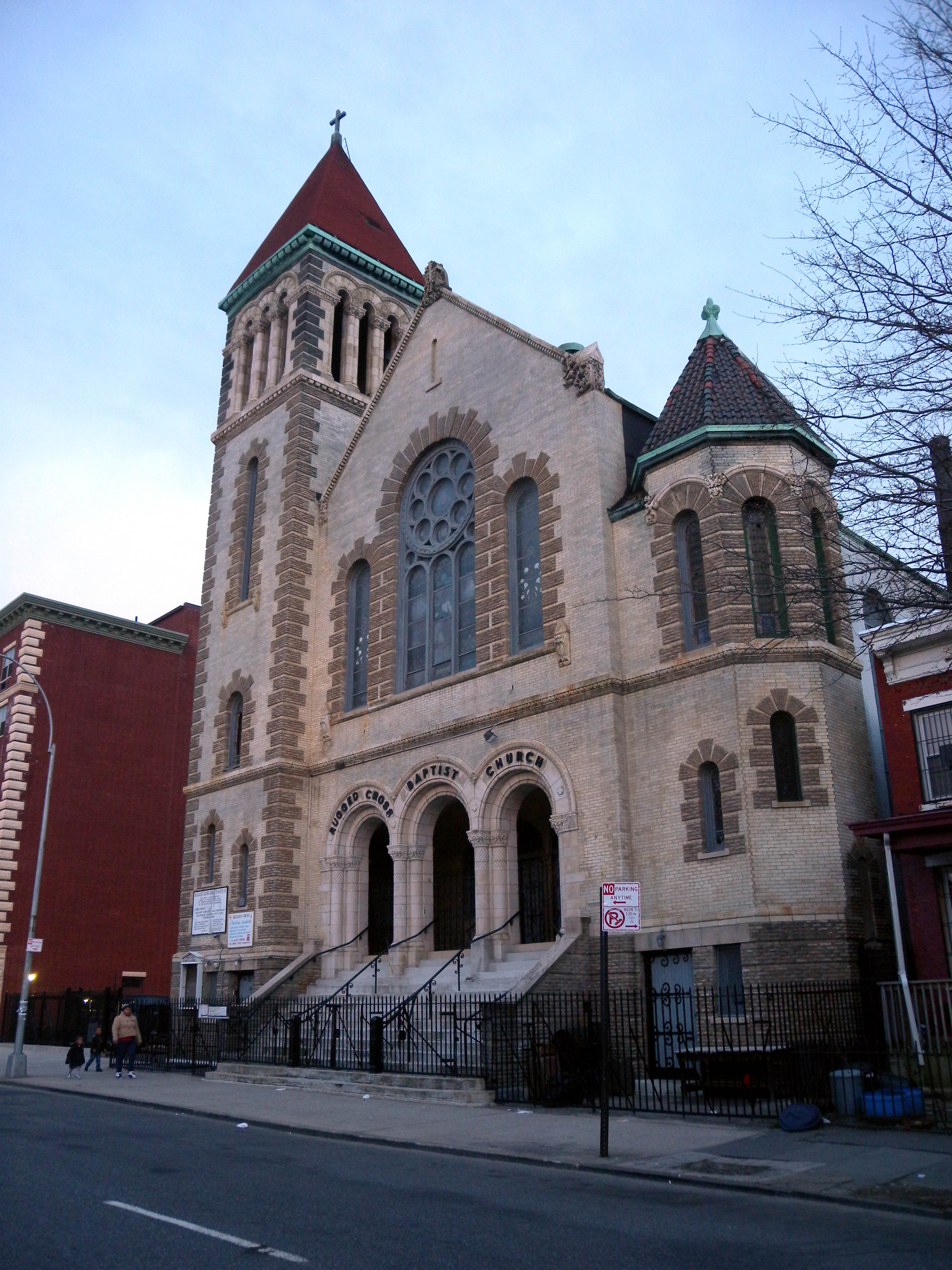

- Location within New York City Location within New York Location within the United States
- Location: 1084 Lafayette Ave., Brooklyn, New York
- Coordinates: 40°41′32″N 73°55′43″W
- Area: less than one acre
- Architects: Dodge & Morrison; Mayer, Franz Studios
- Architectural style: Romanesque
- NRHP reference No.: 07000870
- NYSRHP No.: 04701.015749

Significant dates
- Added to NRHP: August 30, 2007
- Designated NYSRHP: June 29, 2007

Christ Evangelical English Lutheran Church, also known as Rugged Cross Baptist Church, is a historic Evangelical Lutheran church at 1084 Lafayette Avenue, 11221, in Bedford-Stuyvesant, Brooklyn, New York. It was built in 1898–1899 in the Romanesque Revival style. It is faced in cream colored brick with beige brick and terra cotta trim. The front facade is arranged with a two story tall central gable flanked by asymmetrical towers.

It was listed on the National Register of Historic Places in 2007.
