= Strack Pond =

Pond in Queens, New York

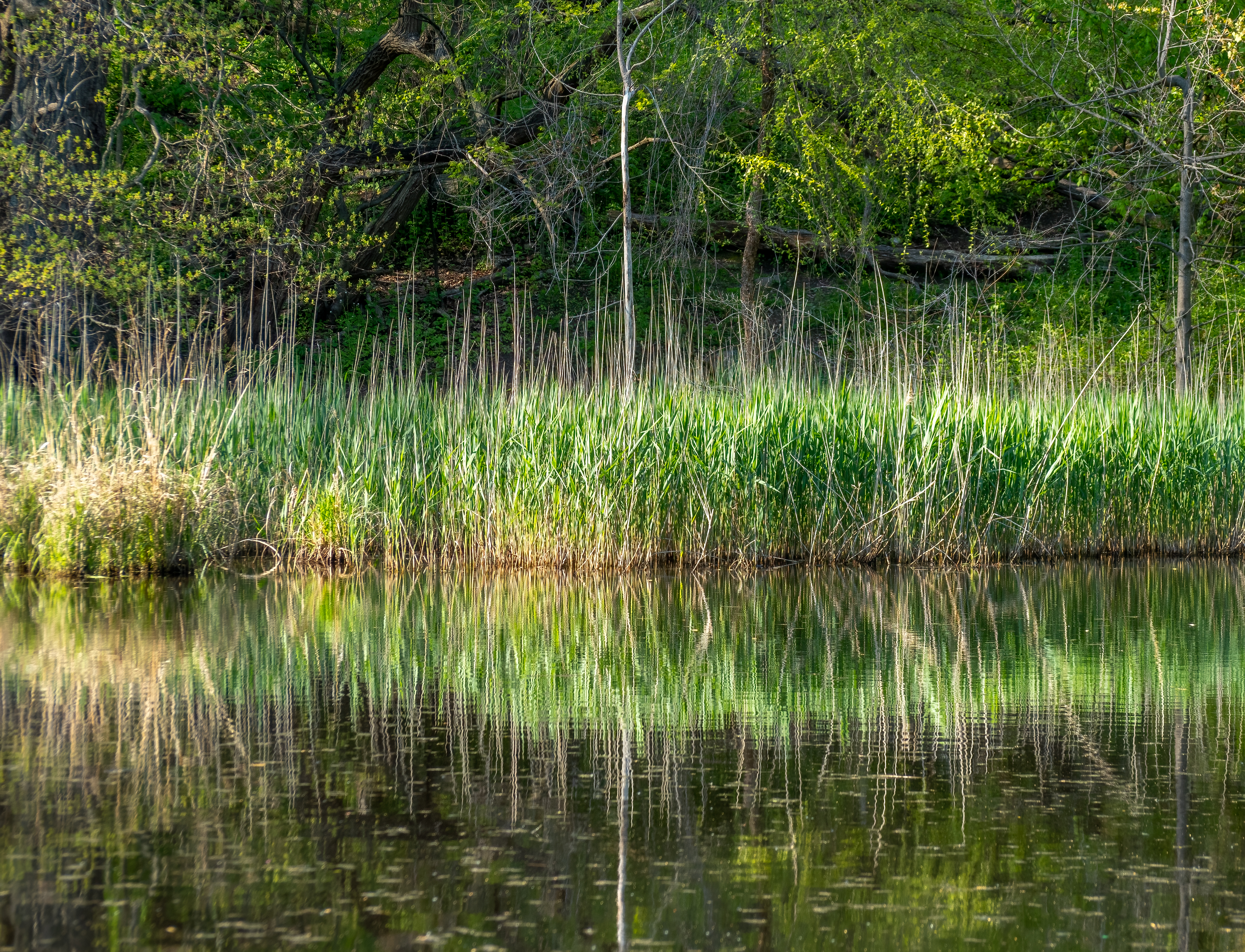
- Strack Pond in 2020
- Interactive map of Strack Pond
- Location: Forest Park, Queens, New York City
- Coordinates: 40°41′25″N 73°51′43″W
- Type: Kettle pond
- Basin countries: United States
- Surface area: 3 acres (1.2 ha)
- Settlements: Queens, New York City

Strack Pond is a glacial kettle pond located inside Forest Park, Queens, New York City. The pond was buried in 1966 and restored four decades later.

== Description ==
Its namesake was a Woodhaven resident killed in the Vietnam War. The pond is located at a point to the west of Woodhaven Boulevard and south of Forest Park Drive in a natural depression. Historically, Strack Pond did not have an official name. It was given its name in February 1969 after Private First Class Lawrence E. Strack. Strack grew up in Woodhaven and ice skated on what was then an unnamed pond. In the summer, he played in the Rich-Haven Little League, which was composed of children from Woodhaven and Richmond Hill. He signed up to serve as a paratrooper in 1966 and briefly returned home to marry his childhood sweetheart. On March 3, 1967 during a combat parachute jump in Vietnam, PFC Strack was killed in a fierce firefight.

For many years after the renaming, the site was used by the Rich-Haven Little League. The site often flooded after even a moderate rain, making it unusable for much of the year. In May 2004, the restored pond was opened to the public as a three-acre nature preserve with a trail descending to the pond. Cleanup of the pond started in 2019. A full renovation with a patio has been proposed but is currently unfunded.

== See also ==
- Lake Success (lake)
- Lake Ronkonkoma (lake)
- Artist Lake
