= Frederick W. Wurster =

American politician (1850–1917)

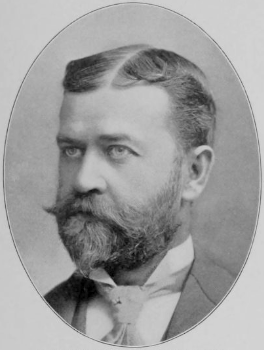

Frederick W. Wurster (April 1, 1850 – June 24, 1917) was a Republican Party politician who served as the mayor of the city of Brooklyn, New York, between 1896 and 1897. He was Brooklyn's final mayor before it was consolidated with New York City on January 1, 1898.

== Early life and business ==
Wurster was born in Plymouth, North Carolina in 1850 to German immigrants. At age 7, his family moved to Brooklyn and attended Public School No. 16. He later went to work at his father's iron and spring factory. Eventually he had his own spring and axle factory on Kent Street and an iron foundry, and he also became involved in the banking industry.

== Politics ==
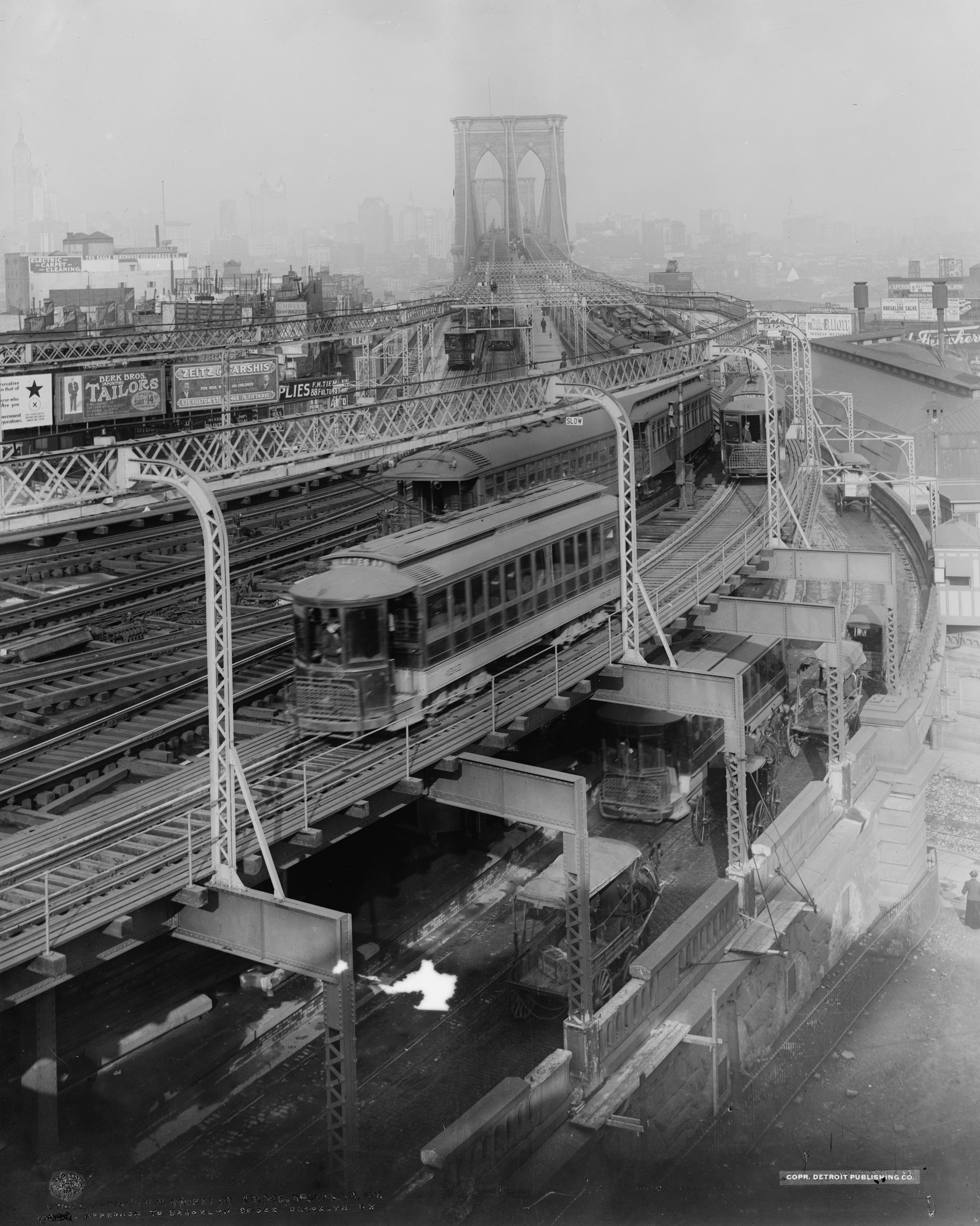
Trolley cars on Brooklyn Bridge

Wurster was not active in politics until his predecessor as mayor Charles A. Schieren appointed him Fire Commissioner. He defeated Democrat Edward M. Grout (who would become Brooklyn's first Borough president in 1898) in a close mayoral election of November 1895. As Wurster took office in January 1896, the City of Brooklyn's expansion to encompass all of Kings County was completed with the annexation of Flatlands.

The Brooklyn Eagle obituary of Wurster described his administration "as precisely what might have been expected from a straightforward business man of good judgment, who had never had any training to develop political initiative. He dealt with matters as they came up and he was both conservative and energetic in his objection to wasting the city's money." Wurster opposed consolidation with New York City, but believed it was inevitable, and as mayor supported a plan to have trolley cars installed on the Brooklyn Bridge. The first trolley crossed on the evening of December 31, 1897, a few hours before the City of Brooklyn ceased to exist, with Wurster on board.

When consolidation occurred, Wurster addressed a reception at Brooklyn City Hall and commented: "We have come to the time of the passing away of this great city .... To some this may appear a mournful occasion, to others it may appear all for the best, but all owe it to the memory of the City of Brooklyn to make the borough of Brooklyn grow great ..." After leaving office, he returned to his business interests.

== Personal and death ==
Wurster married Emily Scheig in 1874, and they built a house at 170 Rodney Street. The couple had six children. Subsequent to his first wife's death in 1899, he married Annie D. Hoffman in 1904.

Ill from strokes suffered in the prior year, Wurster died at his summer home in Belgrade Lakes, Maine on June 24, 1917.

Political offices
Preceded by Charles A. Schieren	Mayor of Brooklyn; 1896–1897	Succeeded by None
