= Crosby's Opera House =

Opera house in Chicago destroyed in 1871 great fire

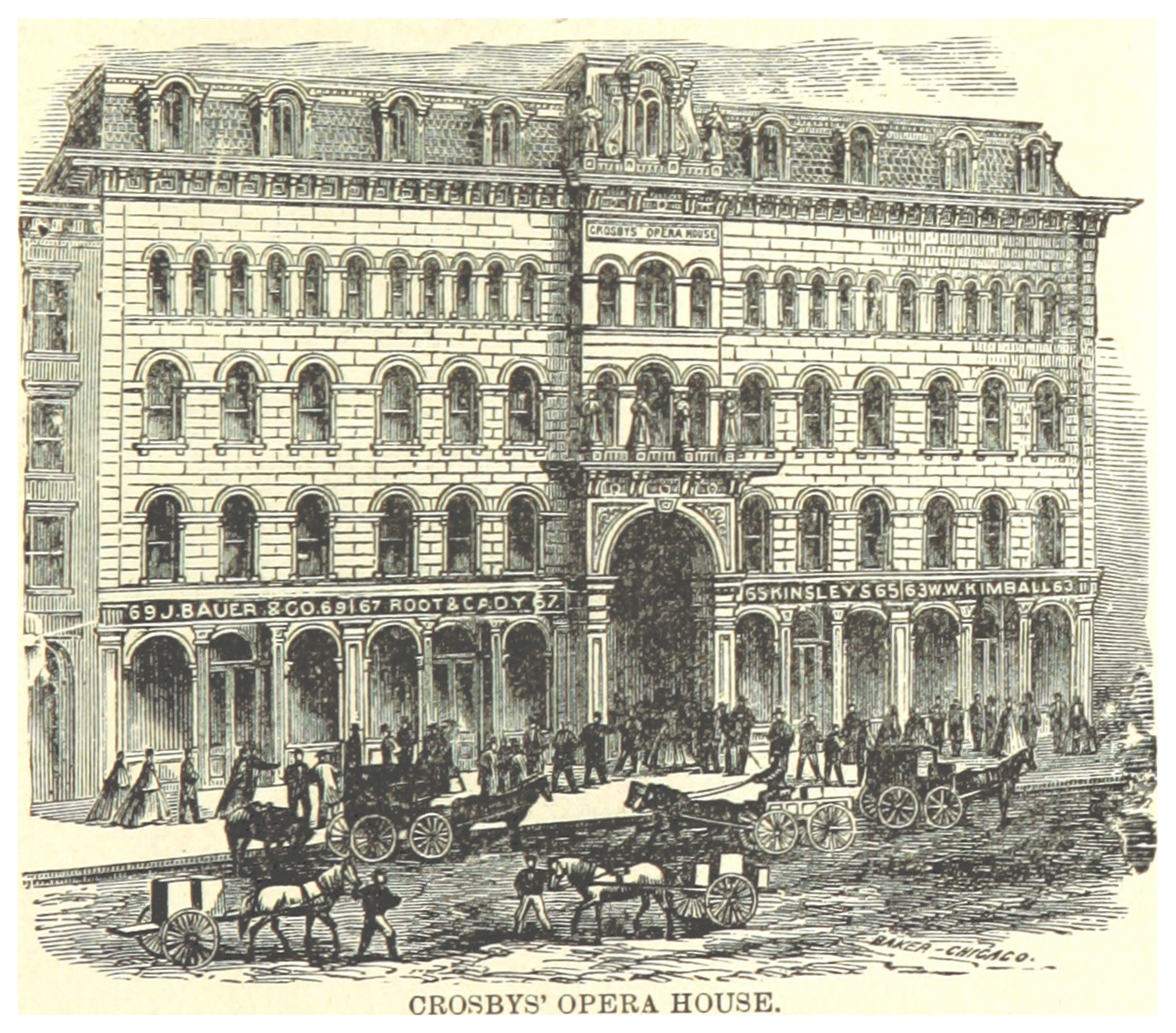
- Interactive map of Crosby's Opera House
- Location: Chicago, Illinois, U.S.
- Coordinates: 41.8835°N 87.6286°W
- Owner: Uranus H. Crosby
- Type: Opera house

Construction
- Opened: April 20, 1865
- Closed: October 9, 1871
- Cost: $600,000

Crosby's Opera House (1865–1871) was an opera house in Chicago, Illinois, United States. It was founded by Uranus H. Crosby in 1865 with the goal of advancing the arts in Chicago by bringing opera to the city. The five-story building was designed by William W. Boyington and contained statues of painting, sculpture, music and commerce that welcomed visitors as they entered through the arch of the building. After holding only occasional performances, Crosby ran into many business difficulties that resulted in a decision to sell the building in 1866. The Crosby Opera House Art Association was formed to help Crosby sell the building by lottery. The lottery distributed over 210,000 tickets, awarding purchasers great works of art and even the building itself. After being sold back to Crosby by the lottery winner, A.H. Lee, the hall began producing more consistent performances. The opera house stood for less than six and a half years before it was destroyed in the Great Chicago Fire of 1871 and was never rebuilt.

In 1989 the city demolished the deteriorated properties on the site where it once stood, and took decades to subsequently formalize plans for redevelopment of the so-called Block 37. During the city's twenty-year discussion regarding what to do with the property, it was used as an art studio for Chicago public school students and as a skating rink through the winter season.

== History ==
Uranus Harold Crosby came to Chicago from Chatham, Massachusetts, on September 4, 1850. He did so on recommendation of his cousin Albert, who insisted that the city was well-cultured. Albert had arrived two years earlier to establish a liquor and tea trading house, Albert Crosby & Co. In 1851, the cousins established a liquor manufactory and the operation became the largest wholesale distributor of distilled alcohol and camphine.

Despite his new-found wealth, Uranus Crosby was disappointed at the lack of culture that he was promised in Chicago. The growing city could offer little more than brothels, saloons, and gambling houses for entertainment. The area's only theater, built by John Blake Rice in 1847, had been destroyed in a fire shortly before Crosby's arrival. When Rice rebuilt the theater in 1851, Crosby was disappointed by Rice's lack of interest in exhibiting opera performances. James Hubert McVicker, a close friend of Crosby's who was a neighbor in the Briggs House hotel, built a playhouse. Crosby probably assisted McVicker with raising credit for the institution.

By 1855, Rice had retired from the theater business, leaving his theater a house of novelty shows. McVicker's Theater became the cultural center of Chicago entertainment, but Crosby believed that the city was overdue for a grand opera house like the ones he knew back East. He selected a site on the north side of Washington Street between State Street and Dearborn Avenue, then embarked with architect William W. Boyington on a tour of opera houses in Union cities. Boyington then designed Crosby's Opera House with assistant architect John W. Roberts.

The building itself was five stories. The first floor housed businesses like music publishers Root & Cady, the piano store of W.W. Kimball, and the restaurant of H.M. Kinsley. The second and third floors were occupied by business offices and the fourth floor was an art gallery equipped with studios for the artists. The 3,000-seat opera house was situated in the rear of the building. The center of the ceiling was a dome encircled by paintings of Beethoven, Mozart, Auber, Weber, Verdi, and Wagner. Surrounding it were frescoes that were painted by Otto Jevne and Peter M. Almini, who were partners in a Chicago decorating firm specializing in ornamental painting. A forty-foot painting of Aurora, based on Guido Reni's fresco, was displayed at the front of the stage above the orchestra. Wellbaum & Bauman handled carpentry and masonry with cut stone work by L. H. Boldenweck. The structure cost $600,000 (equivalent to $12,620,000 in 2025), which ruined Crosby financially.

=== Early performances ===
Crosby's Opera House was scheduled to open April 17, 1865. The conductor Jules Grau would lead the inaugural series of Italian operas, performed by a company from New York City's Academy of Music featuring Clara Louise Kellogg. However, the assassination of Abraham Lincoln forced a three-day delay in the house's opening. Il trovatore was the first performance, followed by a four-week season with Lucia di Lammermoor, Il Poliuto, Martha, Norma, Faust, Linda di Chamounix, La sonnambula, I puritani, Un ballo in maschera, Dom Sébastien, Lucrezia Borgia, Ernani, and Fra Diavolo. Many of the performances were assessed by critic George Upton, a critic for the Chicago Tribune who arrived to Chicago in 1855 with a bachelor of music degree from Brown University. Upton favored Italian opera and had strong feelings against Wagnerian opera.

Because the opera house did not employ a permanent company, performances were not consistently scheduled. In late May 1865, three comedies and a performance of Hamlet were staged as a benefit for the Chicago Sanitary Fair. Karl Formes gave concerts that September, followed by performances by the Hanlon Brothers comedy group. The Music Hall annex, intended mostly for lectures and concerts, was completed on November 29. It was here that Edwin Forrest made his first appearance in Chicago since 1848 on January 22, 1866, with a company led by John Edward McCullough and James Edward Murdoch gave a reading for charity on February 5, 1866.

After its brief heyday, the opera house began to experience a lull in activity. Crosby had overestimated the demand for opera in the city. The public's disinterest in operatic performances paired with Crosby's inexperience as a theater manager contributed to Crosby falling further into debt. The opera house remained open between opera performances by programming minstrel shows like comedy acts, dancing, and theater performances.

=== The Crosby Opera House lottery ===
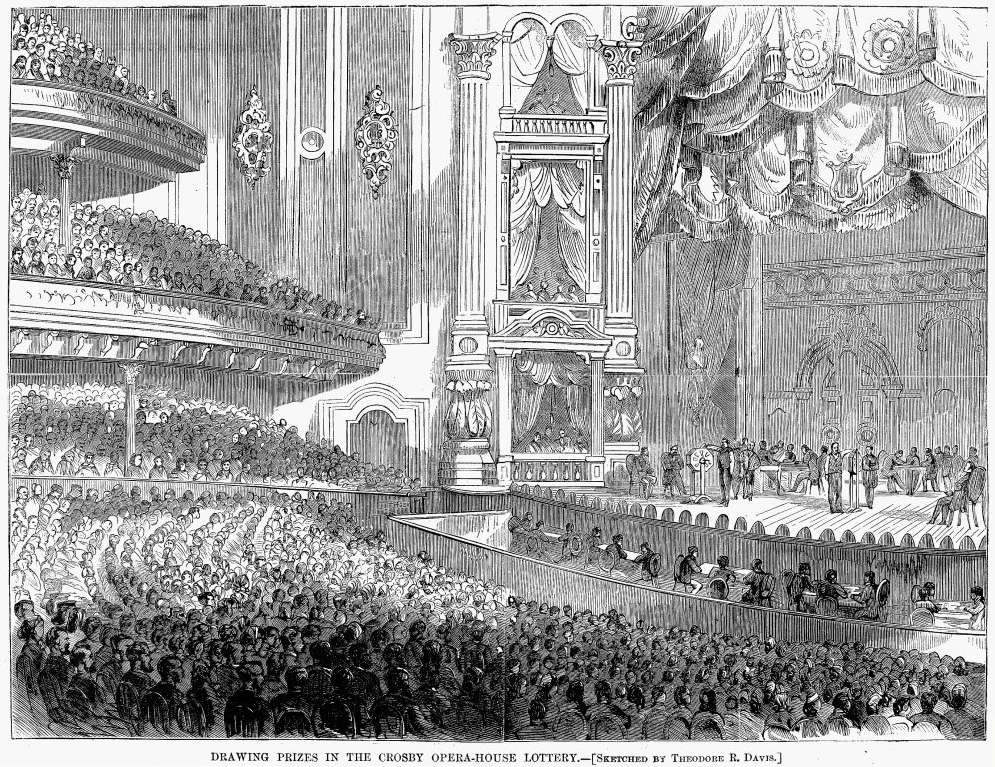
View of the auditorium and stage on the day of the lottery

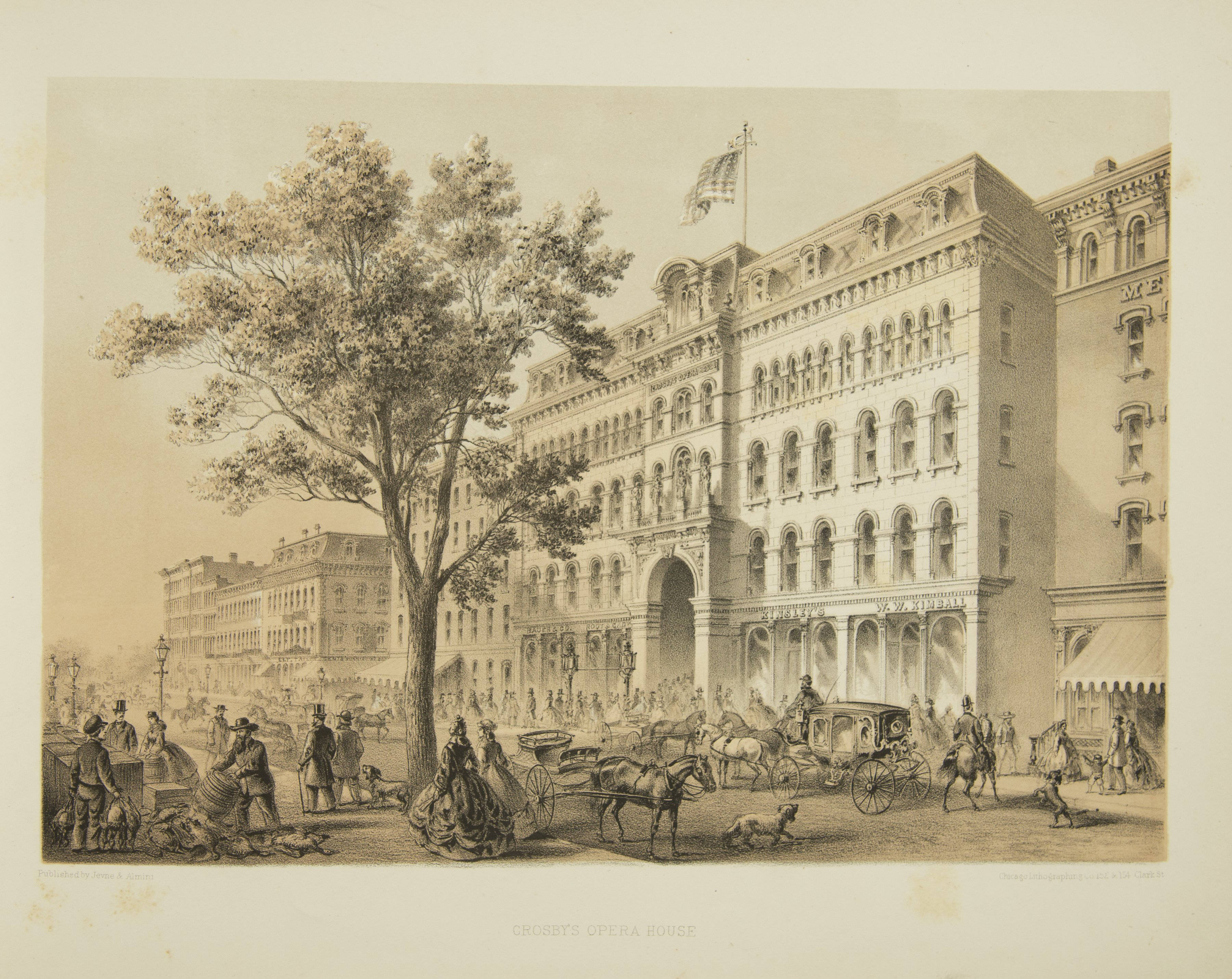
Crosby Opera House on the day of the lottery

By May 1866, investors were weary of the leadership of Crosby, who failed to make significant profit on the property. The Crosby Opera House Art Association was formed and they organized a scheme to raise funds and dispose of property through a lottery. Instead of having people think they were gambling, they encouraged people to believe they were promoting culture in the city. For $5 a ticket, people would receive an engraving and had the chance to acquire the opera house or any of its holdings. Works from the art gallery wing were of particular interest. The lottery was very successful, and the association had to open branch offices in other cities to comply with the demand for tickets. In the meantime, the money raised helped the opera house to hold performances from Euphrosyne Parepa-Rosa and Pasquale Brignoli, which were free to anyone holding a ticket. The prizes, and their values advertised, were:

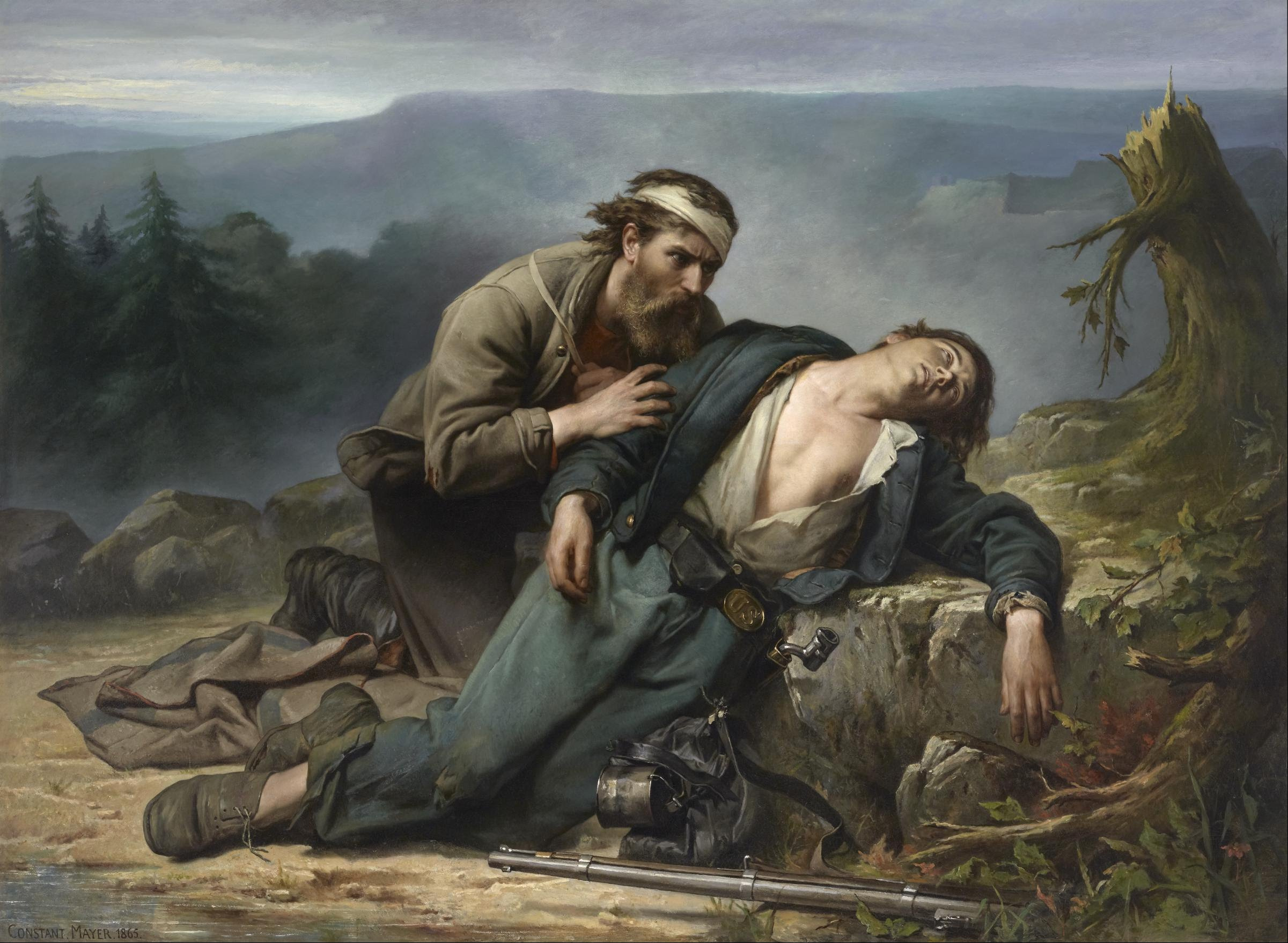
Recognition, by Constant Mayer, was the sixth prize of the lottery.

- First: Crosby's Opera House, valued at $600,000 plus $30,000 expected earnings per year of use
- Second: Albert Bierstadt's The Yo Semite Valley, valued at $20,000.
- Third: Jasper Francis Cropsey's An American Autumn, valued at $9,000
- Fourth: Christian Schussele's Washington Irving and His Friends, valued at $5,000
- Fifth: James McDougal Hart's Woods in Autumn, valued at $5,000
- Sixth: Constant Mayer's Recognition, valued at $5,000
- Seventh: William Holbrook Beard's Deer on the Prairie, valued at $4,000
- Eighth: Régis François Gignoux's Alpine Scenery, valued at $3,000

The drawing was originally scheduled for October 11, 1866, but because of high ticket demand it was delayed until January 21, 1867. The association distributed 210,000 tickets and offered three hundred and two prizes, with the opera house as the grand prize. 25,593 tickets were purchased by Crosby in hopes of maintaining ownership; the rest were sold. Most shops and businesses in Chicago closed so that employees could attend the event. Nineteen trusted public officials from around the country such as banker William F. Coolbaugh, former Lieutenant Governor of Illinois Francis Hoffmann, American Express agent J. C. Fargo, and historian David Pulsifer oversaw the drawing. On the morning of the 21st, special trains brought ticket-buyers from all over the country into the city. At precisely 11 AM the first ticket number was pulled out of a drum. This continued until 112 pieces of art were awarded to visiting patrons. Woods in Autumn was won by J. J. Taylor of Springfield, Illinois and Alpine Scenery was awarded to E. P. Dwyer of Chicago. Crosby maintained possession of The Yo Semite Valley, An American Autumn, and a sculpture of Abraham Lincoln by Leonard Volk, valued at $2,500. Deer on the Prairie was awarded to Daniel Russell of Boston, Massachusetts. A. H. Lee of Prairie du Rocher, Illinois had the winning ticket, #58,600, for the opera house. However, Lee's wife was ill and he had little interest in leaving her for Chicago. On January 25, 1867, he met with Crosby in Chicago and agreed to sell the house to him for $200,000. The public bought over $1,000,000 in chances on a $600,000 building. Subtracting the $200,000 given to A.H. Lee, Crosby paid off the construction cost and pocketed profits all while still maintaining ownership of the opera house. Given the convenience of the transaction, the public began to speculate as to whether or not A. H. Lee even existed or if Crosby had staged the outcome. Shortly after, Uranus Crosby returned to Massachusetts.

=== Later engagements ===
Adelaide Ristori made her first Chicago appearance the day after the lottery, January 22, 1867, as the lead role in Médée. James William Wallack and Edward Loomis Davenport gave a rendition of Othello on September 16. Edward Payson Weston held two receptions on November 28 after completing his walk from Portland, Maine. Patrick Gilmore's band, featuring Camilla Urso, began a series of concerts starting January 20, 1868. Fanny Janauschek performed for two weeks starting February 18. Works included Médée, Adriana Lecouvreur, Marie Stuart, Deborah, Love and Intrigue, and Emilia Galotti. Edwin Forrest made a final appearance in Chicago on March 23. The opera house was host to the 1868 Republican National Convention.

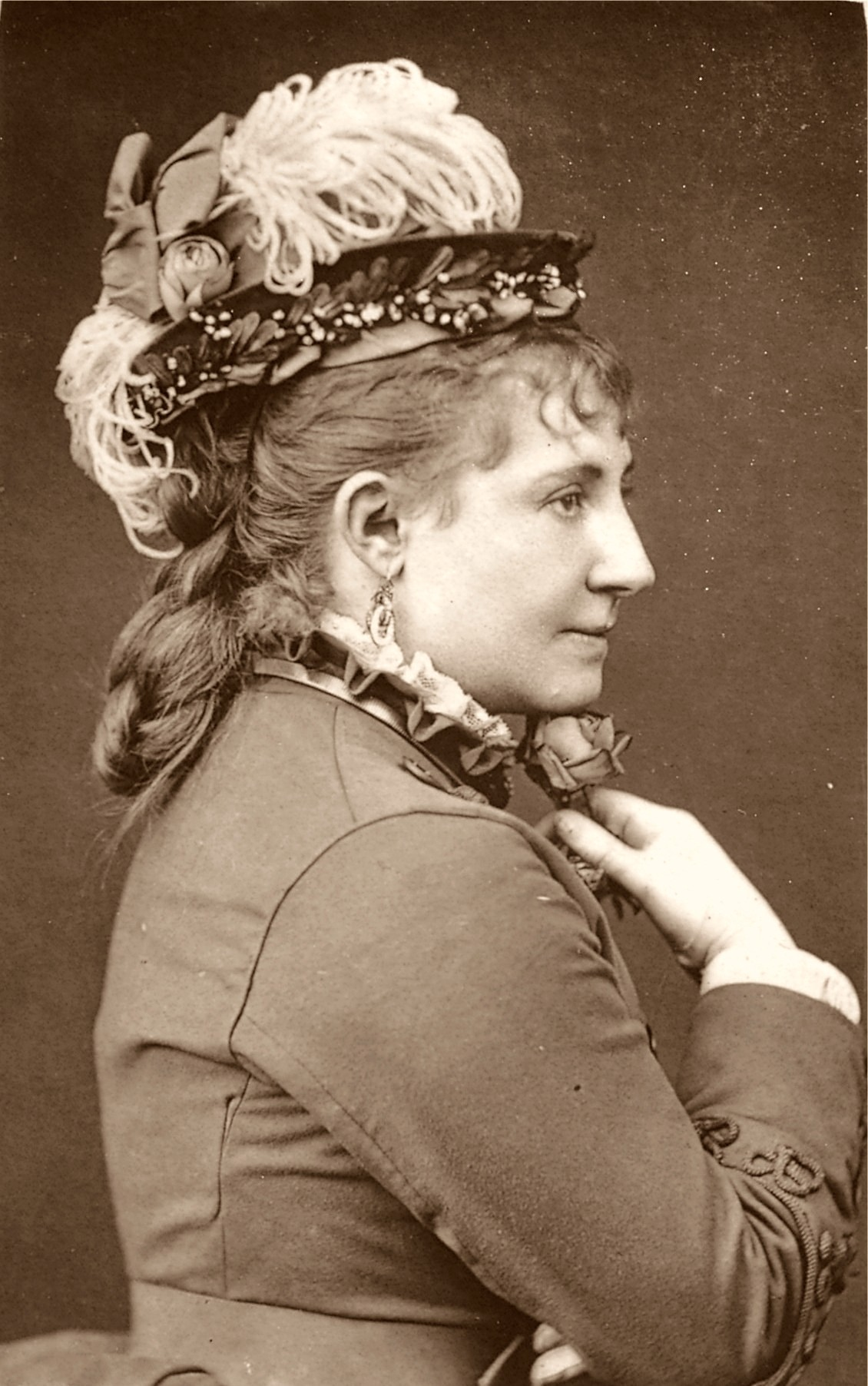
Lydia Thompson was arrested after attacking Wilbur F. Storey following his scathing review in the Chicago Times of one of her performances.

In November 1869, Lydia Thompson brought her troupe of dancers for a burlesque. She returned the next year on February 14. Thompson performed again on the 24th with Pauline Markham; after a particularly foul review by Wilbur F. Storey in the Chicago Times, Thompson and Markham assaulted Storey in the street. Four were arrested and the trial made headlines. In April 1870, the Germania Männerchor gave three performances of The Magic Flute. In May, they exhibited Stradella. In November, Marie Seebach presented Marie Stuart and Faust.

Christina Nilsson sang three concerts in December 1870. Starting on December 28 and continuing for over a month, notorious businessman James Fisk leased the house for his production, The Twelve Temptations. Following the outrage over Rev. Lorenzo Sabine's refusal to accept the remains of actor George Holland, a charity event was held on February 16, 1871, at Crosby's, raising almost $2,000 in support of Rev. George Hendric Houghton at the Little Church Around the Corner. Charles Wyndham gave the last major performance, a two-week engagement with his English Comedy Company.

=== Destruction ===
In the summer of 1871, the opera house underwent alterations after $80,000 had been raised to lavishly redecorate the venue. An advertisement stated that the Crosby Opera House was to re-open on October 9, 1871, with a performance by Theodore Thomas. Theodore Thomas was on tour in early October 1871 and had planned to head to the opera house for a two-week series event of orchestral concerts for the reopening. However, two years of planning were wasted when a fire tore through the city on the night before the re-opening. By the evening of the next day, the Great Chicago Fire had destroyed over 3.3 square miles (8.5 km^{2}) of the city, including Crosby's Opera House.

When the fire bell alarmed on Sunday, October 8, many Chicagoans paid no attention since the summer had been particularly dry and there had already been several fires. A strong wind blew through the city and exhausted the firefighters' efforts. By Tuesday morning the fire had ended and nearly 300 people died, 100,000 were homeless, and Chicago's business district was in ruins. Chief usher James S. Osgood and Crosby went back to the opera house to save some of the art gallery. They took large pictures out of the frames and lowered them by rope out of the windows, eventually taking them to Garrisons House at 226 South Wabash Street. Thomas and his orchestra played a benefit concert at their next stop in St. Louis in honor of the Chicago area. It was never rebuilt, and there was no permanent venue for opera in the city until the Chicago Opera House opened in 1885.

== External References ==
In 1865, Frederic Woodman Root wrote Crosby's Opera House Waltz and dedicated it to U.H. Crosby.
