= Franklin Bound =

American politician

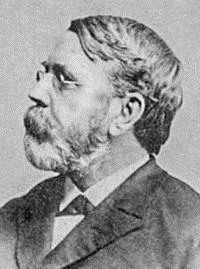
- The Hon. Franklin Bound, c. 1890s

Member of the U.S. House of Representatives from Pennsylvania's 14th district
- In office March 4, 1885 – March 3, 1889
- Preceded by: Samuel F. Barr
- Succeeded by: John W. Rife

Member of the Pennsylvania Senate
- In office 1860–1863

Personal details
- Born: April 9, 1829 Milton, Pennsylvania
- Died: August 8, 1910 (aged 81) Milton, Pennsylvania
- Party: Republican
- Spouse: Emma E. Bound

Franklin Bound (April 9, 1829 – August 8, 1910) was a Republican member of the Pennsylvania State Senate, who served with the 28th Pennsylvania Militia, Emergency of 1863 during the American Civil War, and was elected to represent Pennsylvania's 14th District, post-war, as a member of the U.S. House of Representatives.

Appointed as a delegate to the 1860 political convention at which Andrew Gregg Curtin was nominated to be his party's candidate for governor of the Commonwealth of Pennsylvania, Bound was also a delegate to the post-war Republican National Convention in Chicago, Illinois in 1868.

== Formative years ==
Born in Milton, Pennsylvania on April 9, 1829, Bound attended the common schools of Northumberland County, as well as the Milton Academy, which was located in his hometown.

Bound also subsequently studied law, and graduated from the Easton Law School in Easton, Pennsylvania. Admitted to the bar in 1853, he then opened a private law practice in Milton.

== American Civil War ==
As a member of the Pennsylvania State Senate from 1860 to 1863, Bound represented District 13, and was chosen to serve as a delegate to the political convention which nominated Andrew Gregg Curtin to serve as Pennsylvania's Civil War-era governor.

When troops from the Confederate States Army threatened Pennsylvania's safety during the third year of America's Civil War, Bound enlisted as a private with Company E of the 28th Pennsylvania Militia, Emergency of 1863. Mustering in for duty in June 1863, he was honorably discharged with his militia unit roughly a month later when state officials determined that the state of emergency had ended following the Gettysburg loss and subsequent retreat back across the state line by the army of General Robert E. Lee.

== Post-war life and political career ==
Married to Emma E. Bound (1849–1917), he and his wife were the parents of Nellie (Bound) Davis (1886–1967). They resided at 139 South Front Street in Milton, Pennsylvania.

After purchasing the Miltonian newspaper in 1867, Franklin Bound served as that publication's editor for two years.

Elected as a Republican to the Forty-ninth and Fiftieth sessions of the United States Congress, Bound was also chosen to serve as a delegate to the 1868 Republican National Convention, but was not a candidate for renomination in 1888, opting instead to resume his legal career, which he continued until his retirement at the turn of the century.

A longtime member of the Free and Accepted Masons who had served as master of the Milton Lodge in 1855, Bound remained active with the F. & A.M. for many years.

== Illness, death and interment ==
Ailing for roughly a decade during the opening years of the 20th century, Bound died at his home in Milton on the morning of August 8, 1910. Following funeral services, he was buried at the Milton Cemetery in Milton, Pennsylvania.

U.S. House of Representatives
Preceded by Samuel F. Barr	Member of the U.S. House of Representatives from Pennsylvania's 14th congressional district 1885–1889	Succeeded by John W. Rife
