= John W. Rife =

American politician

- Born: John Winebrenner Rife; August 14, 1846; Middletown, Dauphin County, Pennsylvania, United States
- Died: April 17, 1908 (aged 61)

John Winebrenner Rife (August 14, 1846 – April 17, 1908) was a Republican member of the U.S. House of Representatives from Pennsylvania.

== Formative years ==
John W. Rife was born in Middletown, Pennsylvania on August 14, 1846. He attended the common schools, and subsequently learned the trade of tanner.

== Military service ==
Rife enlisted July 15, 1864, as a private in Company D, One Hundred and Ninety-fourth Regiment, Pennsylvania Volunteer Infantry, and served until honorably discharged on November 6, 1864.

== Public service career ==
Rife served as a member of the city council of Middletown in 1871, and as burgess of Middletown in 1877 and 1878. He served as a member of the Pennsylvania State House of Representatives in 1885 and 1886. He served as president of the Middletown & Hummelstown Railroad Co.

Rife was elected as a Republican to the Fifty-first and Fifty-second Congresses. He was not a candidate for renomination.

== Death and interment ==
Rife died in Middletown on April 17, 1908, and was interred at the Middletown Cemetery.

== See also ==
U.S. House of Representatives
| Preceded by Franklin Bound | Member of the U.S. House of Representatives from Pennsylvania's 14th congressional district 1889–1893 | Succeeded by Ephraim M. Woomer |
