= Ephraim M. Woomer =

American politician (1844–1897)

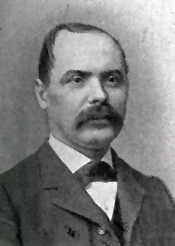

Member of the U.S. House of Representatives from Pennsylvania's 14th district
- In office March 4, 1893 – March 3, 1897
- Preceded by: John W. Rife
- Succeeded by: Marlin E. Olmsted

Personal details
- Born: Ephraim Milton Woomer; January 14, 1844 Jonestown, Lebanon County, Pennsylvania, U.S.
- Died: November 29, 1897 (aged 53) Lebanon, Pennsylvania, U.S.
- Resting place: Mount Lebanon Cemetery, Lebanon, Pennsylvania, U.S.
- Party: Republican
- Profession: Politician

Military service
- Allegiance: United States (Union)
- Rank: Sergeant
- Battles/wars: American Civil War

Ephraim Milton Woomer (January 14, 1844 – November 29, 1897) was a Republican member of the U.S. House of Representatives from Pennsylvania.

== Biography ==
Ephraim M. Woomer was born in Jonestown, Lebanon County, Pennsylvania. He attended the common schools. During the American Civil War he enlisted in Company A, Ninety-third Regiment, Pennsylvania Volunteer Infantry in September 1861, and was later promoted to sergeant. He taught school until 1869, when he became engaged in mercantile pursuits. He served as clerk of the orphans’ court of Lebanon County, Pennsylvania, from 1869 to 1872. He was cashier of the People's Bank of Lebanon and a member of the council of the borough of Lebanon from 1884 to 1886. He was president of the select council of the city of Lebanon from 1886 to 1890. He was a delegate to the 1888 Republican National Convention.

Woomer was elected as a Republican to the Fifty-third and Fifty-fourth Congresses. He was an unsuccessful candidate for renomination in 1896. After his time in Congress, he was again engaged in banking, and died in Lebanon, Pennsylvania, in 1897. He is interred in Mount Lebanon Cemetery.

U.S. House of Representatives
Preceded by John W. Rife	Member of the U.S. House of Representatives from Pennsylvania's 14th congressional district 1893–1897	Succeeded by Marlin E. Olmsted
