= Samuel Fleming Barr =

American politician (1829–1919)

Member of the U.S. House of Representatives from Pennsylvania's 14th district
- In office March 4, 1881 – March 3, 1885
- Preceded by: John W. Killinger
- Succeeded by: Franklin Bound

Personal details
- Born: June 15, 1829 near Coleraine, County Londonderry, Ireland
- Died: May 29, 1919 (aged 89) San Diego, California, U.S.
- Party: Republican

Samuel Fleming Barr (June 15, 1829 – May 29, 1919) was a Republican member of the U.S. House of Representatives from Pennsylvania.

Samuel F. Barr was born near Coleraine, County Londonderry, Ireland. He immigrated to the United States in 1831 with his parents, who settled in Harrisburg, Pennsylvania. He attended the common schools, and worked as a freight agent of the Pittsburgh, Fort Wayne & Chicago Railroad in 1855 and 1856. Early in the United States Civil War was employed upon government railways in and about Washington, D.C. He worked as editor of the Harrisburg Telegraph from 1873 to 1878.

Barr was elected as a Republican to the Forty-seventh and Forty-eighth Congresses. He declined to be a candidate for renomination in 1884. He retired, spending winters in San Diego, California, and summers in Seal Harbor, Maine. He died in San Diego in 1919. Interment in Odd Fellows Cemetery.

== Sources ==
- United States Congress. "Samuel Fleming Barr (id: B000171)". Biographical Directory of the United States Congress.
- The Political Graveyard

U.S. House of Representatives
Preceded by John W. Killinger	Member of the U.S. House of Representatives from Pennsylvania's 14th congressional district 1881–1885	Succeeded by Franklin Bound
