= Constant Mayer =

French painter

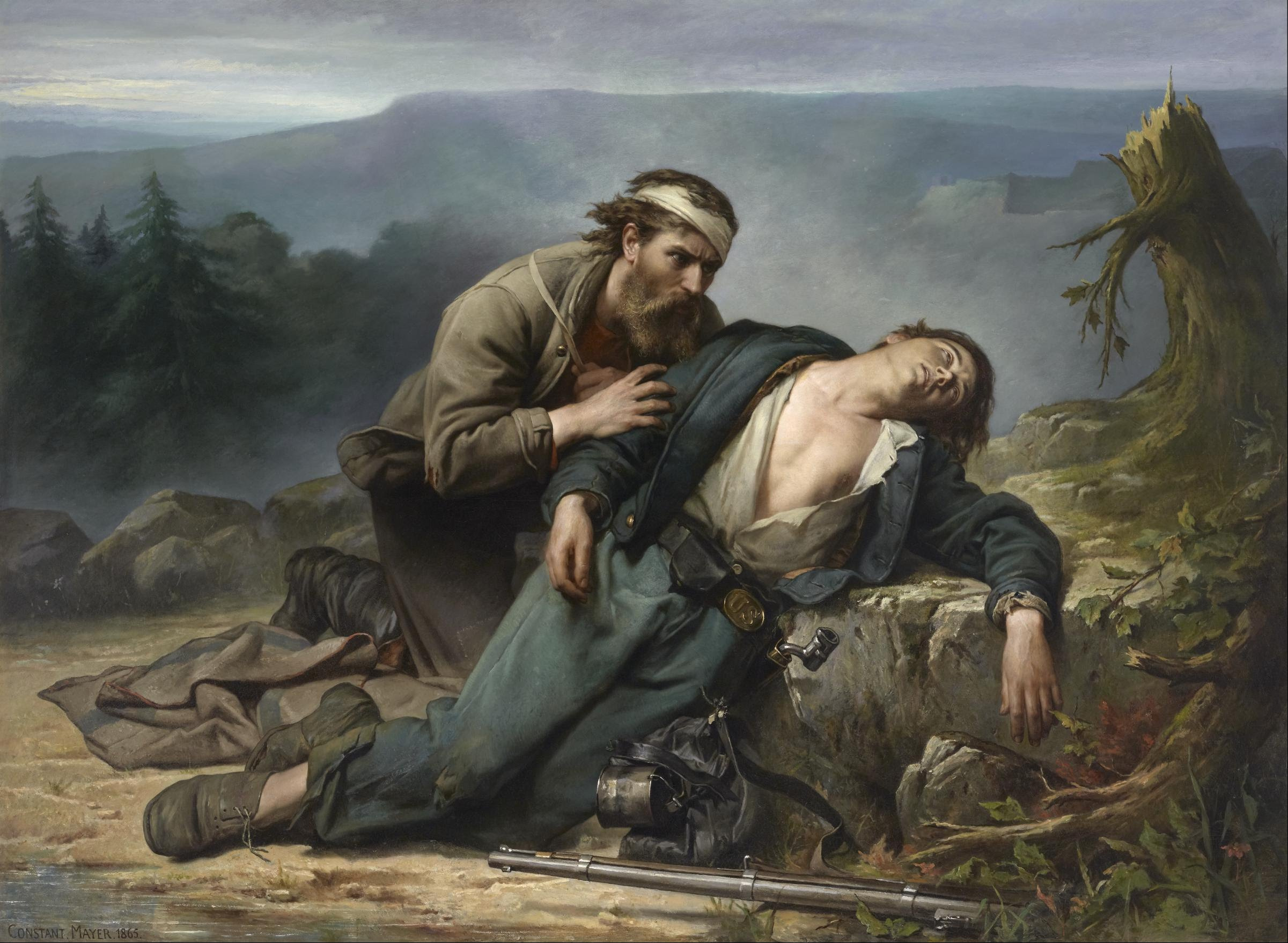
Constant Mayer - Recognition- North and South

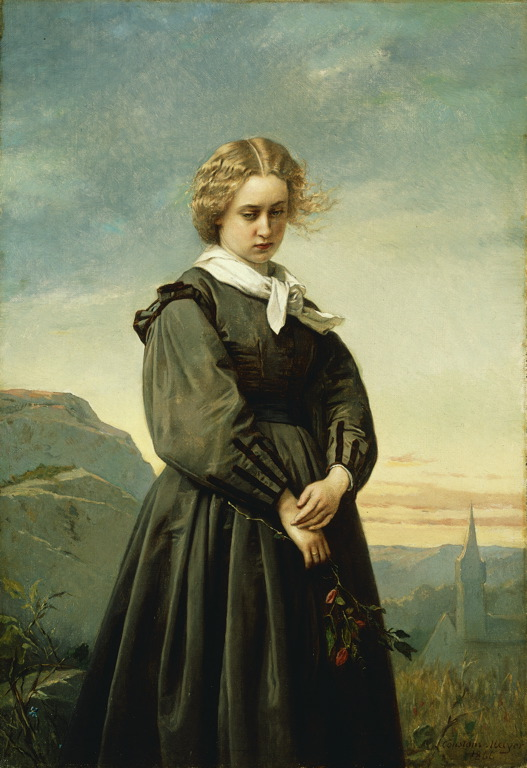
Love's Melancholy, 1866, at The Art Institute of Chicago

Constant Mayer (October 3, 1829 – May 12, 1911) was a French painter who emigrated to the United States.

Mayer was born in Besançon, France to a Jewish family. He studied in Paris in the École des Beaux-Arts and under Léon Cogniet, and followed his profession in that city until 1854, when he moved to New York City. Mayer worked as a colorist at the photography studio of Jeremiah Gurney and CD Fredericks, at 340 Broadway, in Manhattan. With his own studio, at 1155 Broadway, he became known for his genre or historical paintings based on literature, and particularly for his portraits. He also created many sketches and drawings. His sentimental Civil War-themed painting, "Recognition" of 1865, drew considerable attention over the years. In 1869, Mayer was made a chevalier of the Legion of Honor. He had been elected an associate of the National Academy of Design in 1866, and was also a member of the American Art Union.

Mayer left the U.S. in 1869 for Paris, where he died in 1911. In his will he left much of his assets to Jewish causes - in particular Jewish orphanages. Several of Mayer's works appear in the collections of world-renowned museums, such as the Metropolitan Museum of Art and the Art Institute of Chicago.

== Works ==
Mayer is best known by his life-sized genre pictures. He contributed frequently to the Paris Salon. His works include portraits of General Grant of 1866 and General Sherman. Other works include:

- "Beggar-Girl" (1863)
- "Consolation" (1864)
- "Recognition" (1865)
- "Good Words" (1866)
- "Riches and Poverty"
- "Maud Muller"
- "Street Melodies" (1867)
- "Early Grief" (1869)
- "Oracle of the Field"
- "Song of the Shirt" (1875)
- "Song of the Twilight" (1879)
- "In the Woods" (1880)
- "The Vagabonds" (1881)
- "Lord's Day" (1883)
- "Lawn Tennis" (1883)
- "Mandolin Player" (1884)
- "First Grief" (1885)
- "The First Communion" (1886)
- "The Sewing School"
