= David Pulsifer =

American historian (1802–1894)

David Pulsifer (1802 – 1894, in Augusta, Maine), was a historian of colonial America and an archivist, preserver and transcriber of old colonial records from the Massachusetts Bay Colony period. He edited and wrote other related works. He is noted for editing and publishing, The Records of the Colony of New Plymouth in New England, in three volumes. As a primary source it is often referenced by historians of colonial Massachusetts.

== Family ==
David Pulsifer was born on 22 September 1802, in Ipswich, Essex, Massachusetts, United States. Pulsfier's father was Captain Bickford Pulsifer, and his mother, Sarah Stanwood. Pulsfier married Eleanor Robbins Dennen on 11 October 1834, in Shirley, Piscataquis, Maine, United States. They were the parents of at least 4 sons and 5 daughters. He lived in Webster ,Worcester, Massachusetts, United States in 1870 and Boston, Suffolk, Massachusetts, United States in 1880. He died on 9 August 1894, in Massachusetts, United States, at the age of 91.

== Historical career ==
He studied in the district schools, and then went to Salem to learn bookbinding, where, in handling old records, his taste for antiquarian research was first developed. Subsequently, he served as clerk in county courts and transcribed several ancient books of records. In 1853 the governor of Massachusetts called the attention of the executive council to the perishing condition of the early records and recommended that the two oldest volumes of the general court records should be printed at the expense of the state. Ephraim M. Wright and Nathaniel B. Shurtleff were appointed to take charge of the printing, and Pulsifer, who was acknowledged to be especially skilful in deciphering the chirography of the 17th century, was charged with the copying.

Pulsifer, as clerk in the office of the secretary of the commonwealth, supervised the publishing of The Records of the Colony of New Plymouth in New England from 1633 to I679, by the commonwealth of Massachusetts in I855-9. He was the primary copyist for Shurtleff's Records of the Governor and Company of the Massachusetts Bay in New England.

Pulsifer had previously copied the first volume for the American Antiquarian Society. Of his work, Samuel F. Haven, in his introduction to the printed records in the Archaeologia, wrote that Pulsifer "unites the qualities of an expert in chirography with a genuine antiquarian taste and much familiarity with ancient records.”

The Pulsifer Family Papers contain records and documents pertaining to the Bickford and Sarah (Stanwood) Pulsifer family of Ipswich, Massachusetts, including Bickford Jr., Ebenezer, David Pulsifer (1802-1894), and John Stanwood Pulsifer. The family papers are part of the Stanton Avery Special Collections of the New England Historic Genealogical Society.

== Works ==
Pulsifer edited:

- Records of the Colony of New Plymouth in New England (vols. ix. to xii., Boston, 1859–61)
- The Simple Cobbler of Aggawam in America (1843)
- A Poetical Epistle to George Washington, Esq., Commander-in-Chief of the Armies of the United States of America, by Rev. Charles H. Wharton, D. D., first published anonymously in Annapolis in 1779 (1881)
- The Christian's A. B. C., an original manuscript, written in the 18th century by an unknown author (1883)
- Inscriptions from the Burying-Grounds in Salem, Mass. (Boston, 1837)

He wrote:

- Guide to Boston and Vicinity (1866)
- Account of the Battle of Bunker Hill, with General John Burgoyne's Account (1872)

== See also ==
- English colonial empire
- European colonization of the Americas
- British colonization of the Americas
- Colonial America
- List of colonial governors of Massachusetts (includes Plymouth)
