= 1868 Republican National Convention =

American political convention

- 1868 presidential election
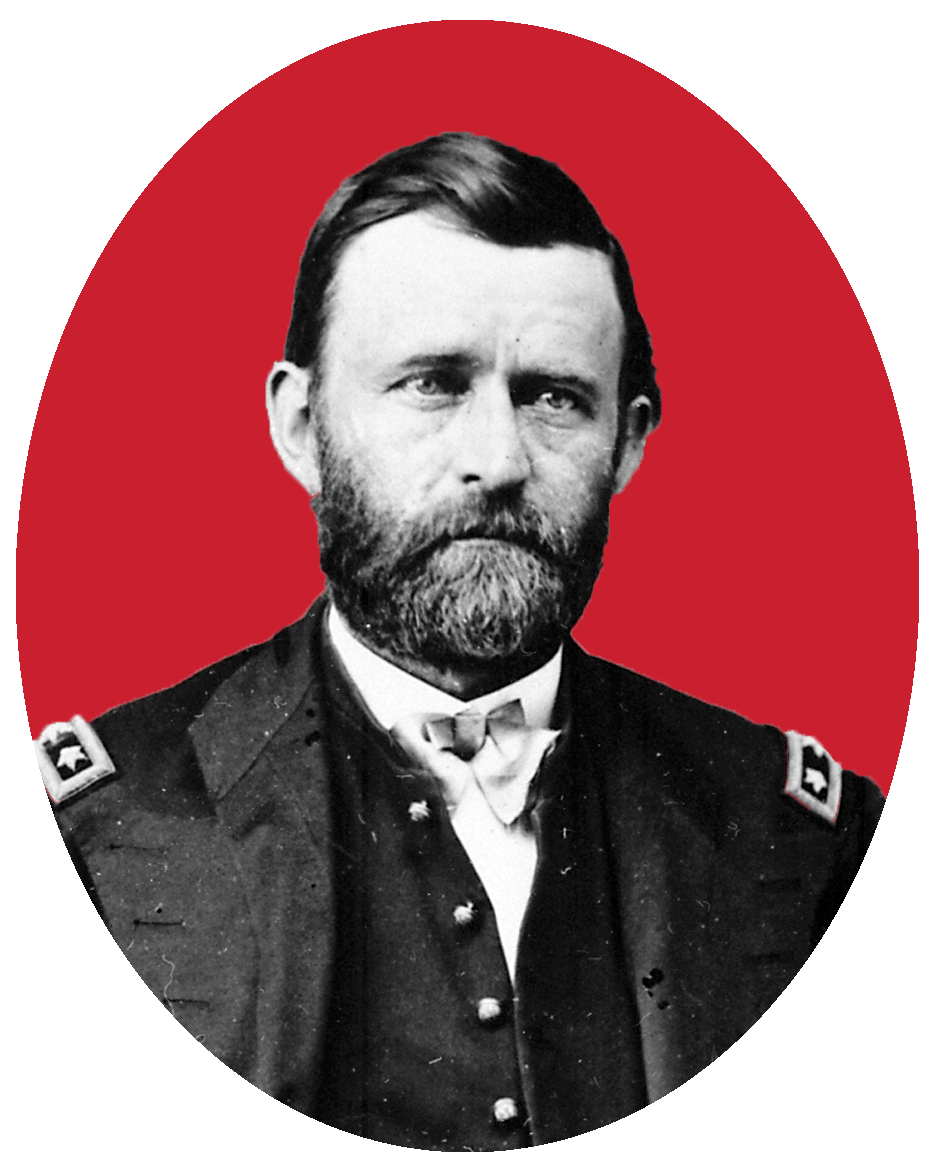
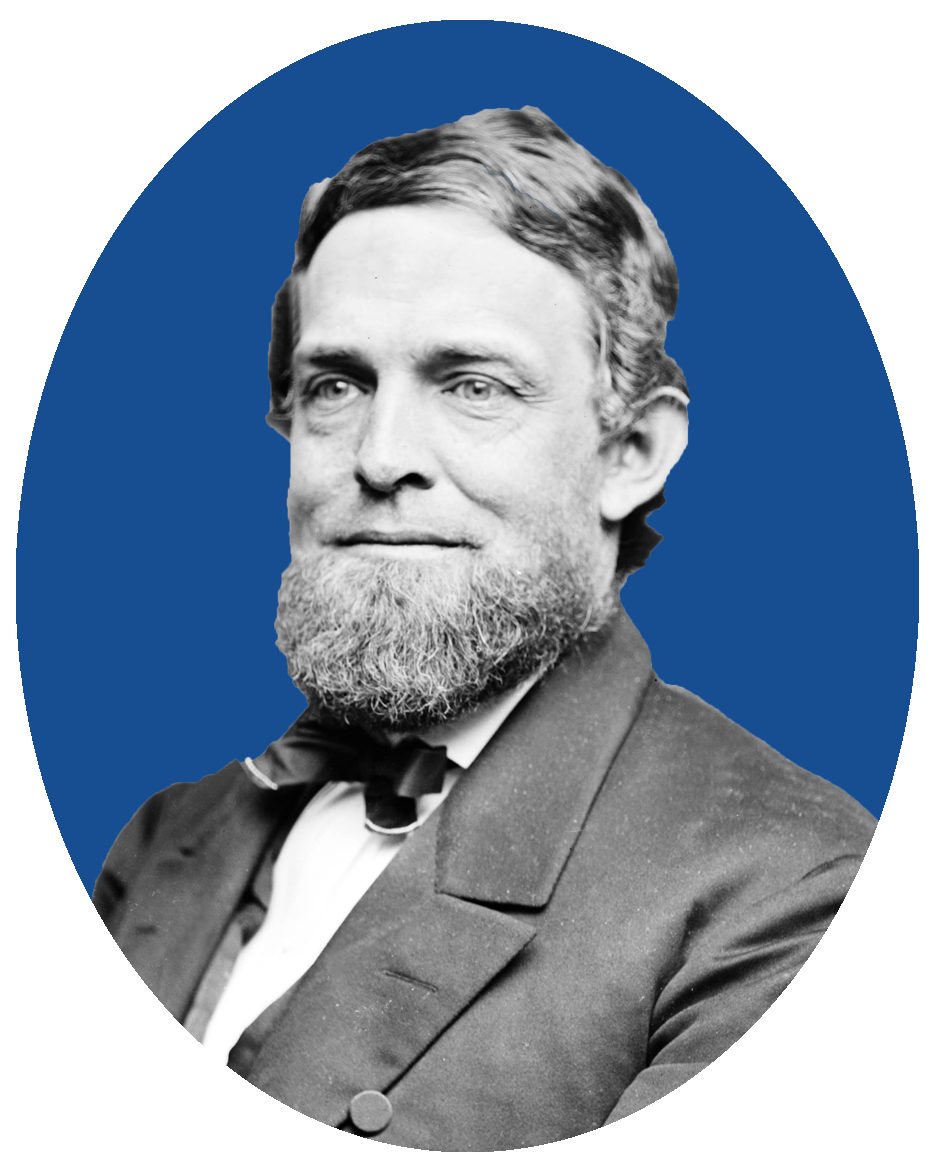
- Nominees; Grant and Colfax

Convention
- Date(s): May 20–21, 1868
- City: Chicago, Illinois
- Venue: Crosby's Opera House

Candidates
- Presidential nominee: Ulysses S. Grant of Illinois
- Vice-presidential nominee: Schuyler Colfax of Indiana

The 1868 Republican National Convention of the Republican Party of the United States was held in Crosby's Opera House, Chicago, Cook County, Illinois, on May 20 to May 21, 1868.

Commanding General of the U.S. Army Ulysses S. Grant was the unanimous choice of the Republican convention delegates for president. For vice president the delegates chose Speaker Schuyler Colfax, who was Grant's choice. In Grant's acceptance telegram, a letter to then President of the Republican National Convention Joseph R. Hawley, Grant said "Let us have peace".

== Background ==
Republicans, led by their Radical faction, had scored decisive victories in the 1866 elections. If that trend continued in the 1867 elections, then the party's presidential nomination would likely go to a Radical like Chief Justice Salmon P. Chase or Senator Benjamin Wade. Chase had the support of important figures like Senator Charles Sumner and financier Jay Cooke. More moderate Republicans, such as Senator William P. Fessenden, Charles Francis Adams Jr., and The New York Times, had interpreted the 1866 elections not as a mandate for radicalism, but as a rejection of President Andrew Johnson's programs and personality; therefore, they were wary of a Radical nominee.

The Grant candidacy, though, took on momentum in the wake of the state elections in 1867. The electorate rejected the Radical Republican agenda by voting for Democratic control in the key Northern states of New York, Pennsylvania, and Ohio, and by rejecting black manhood suffrage amendments in Kansas and Ohio. The election results bolstered the case of the moderate Republicans and seemed to close the door to a Radical nominee. Georges Clemenceau, a Paris Temps journalist who would later be the French premier, reported accurately that "The real victims of the victory of the Democrats are Mr. Wade and Mr. Chase."

== Presidential nomination ==
=== Presidential candidates ===
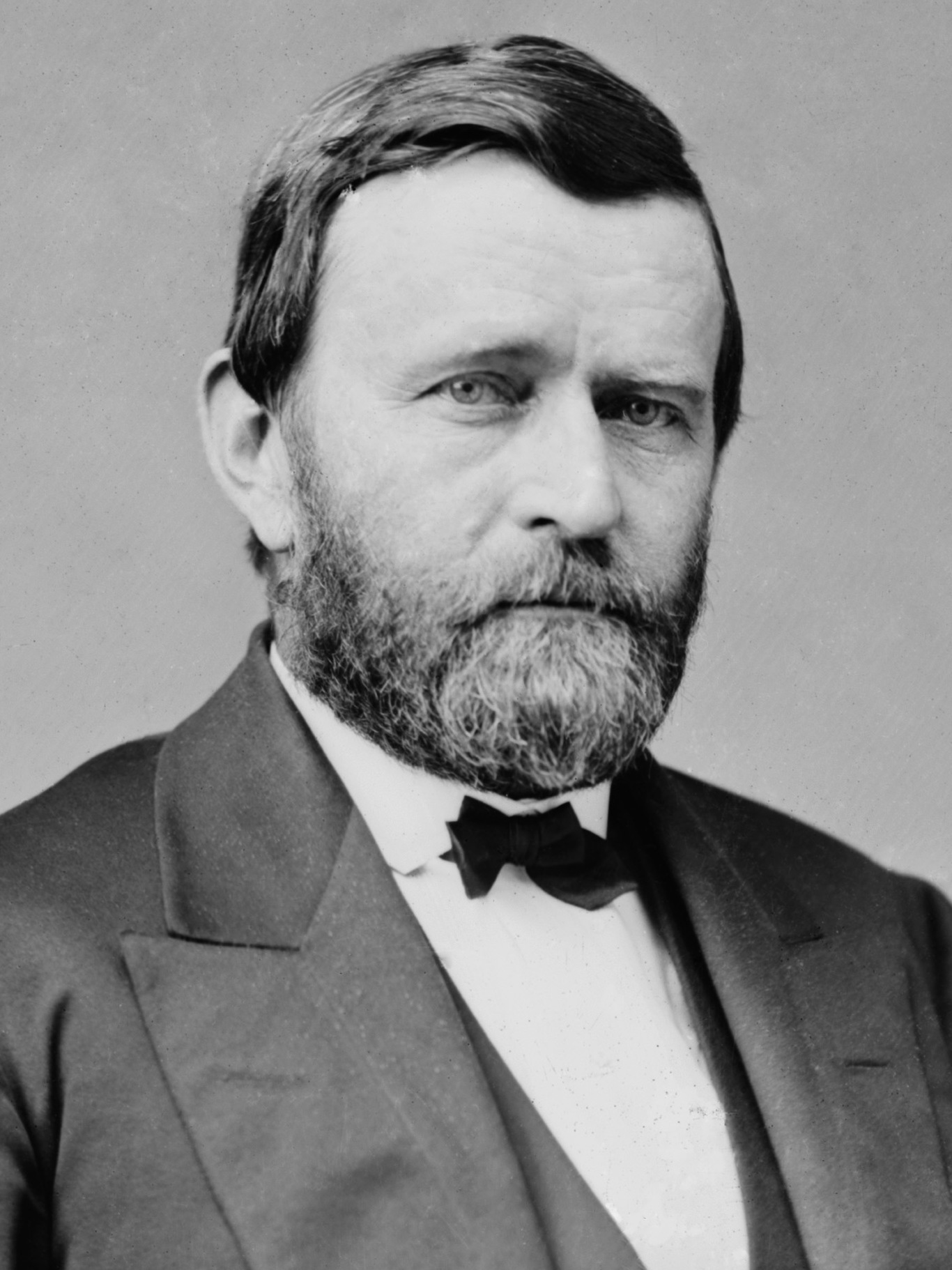
Commanding General
Ulysses S. Grant
of Illinois

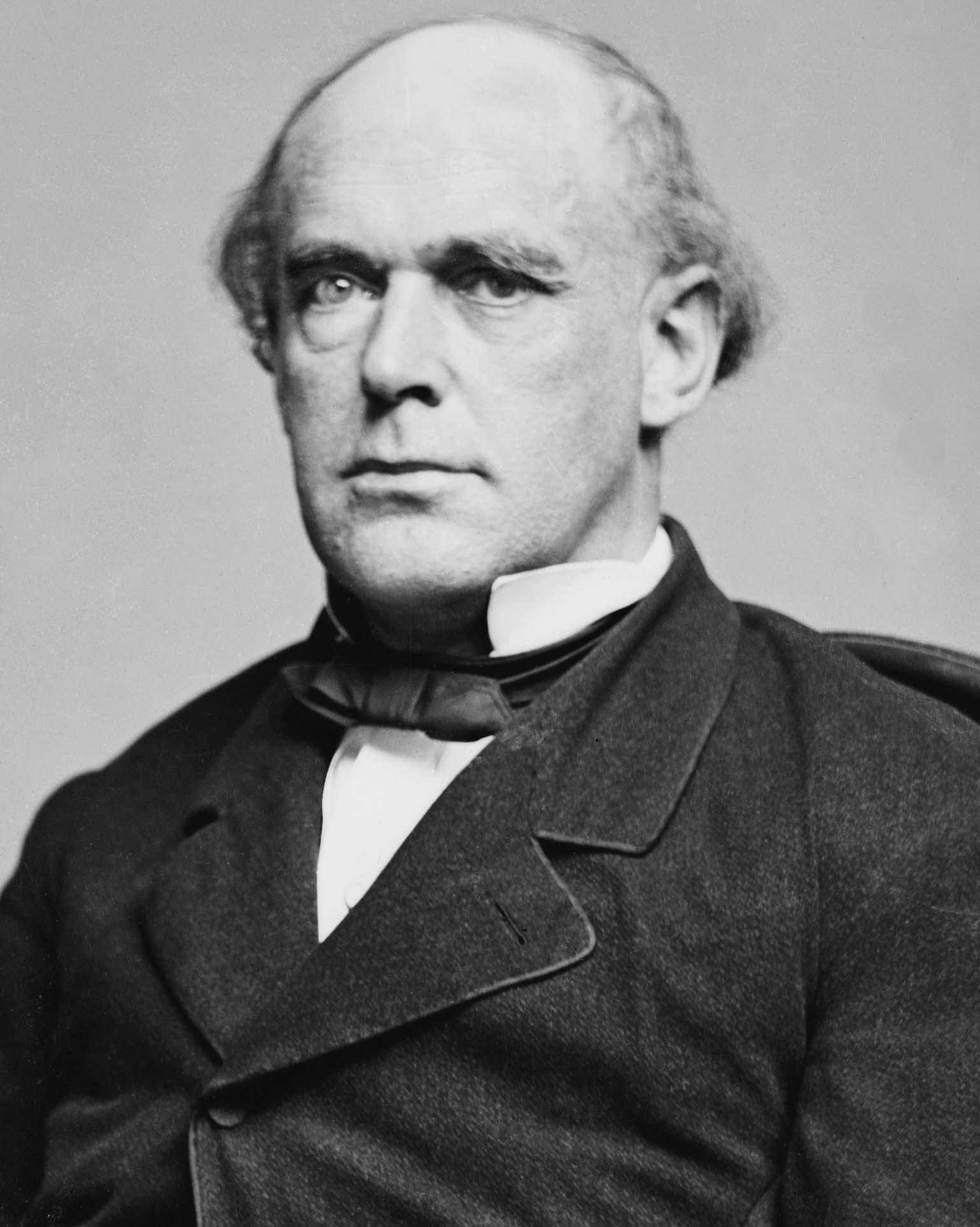
Chief Justice
Salmon P. Chase
of Ohio
(Speculated)

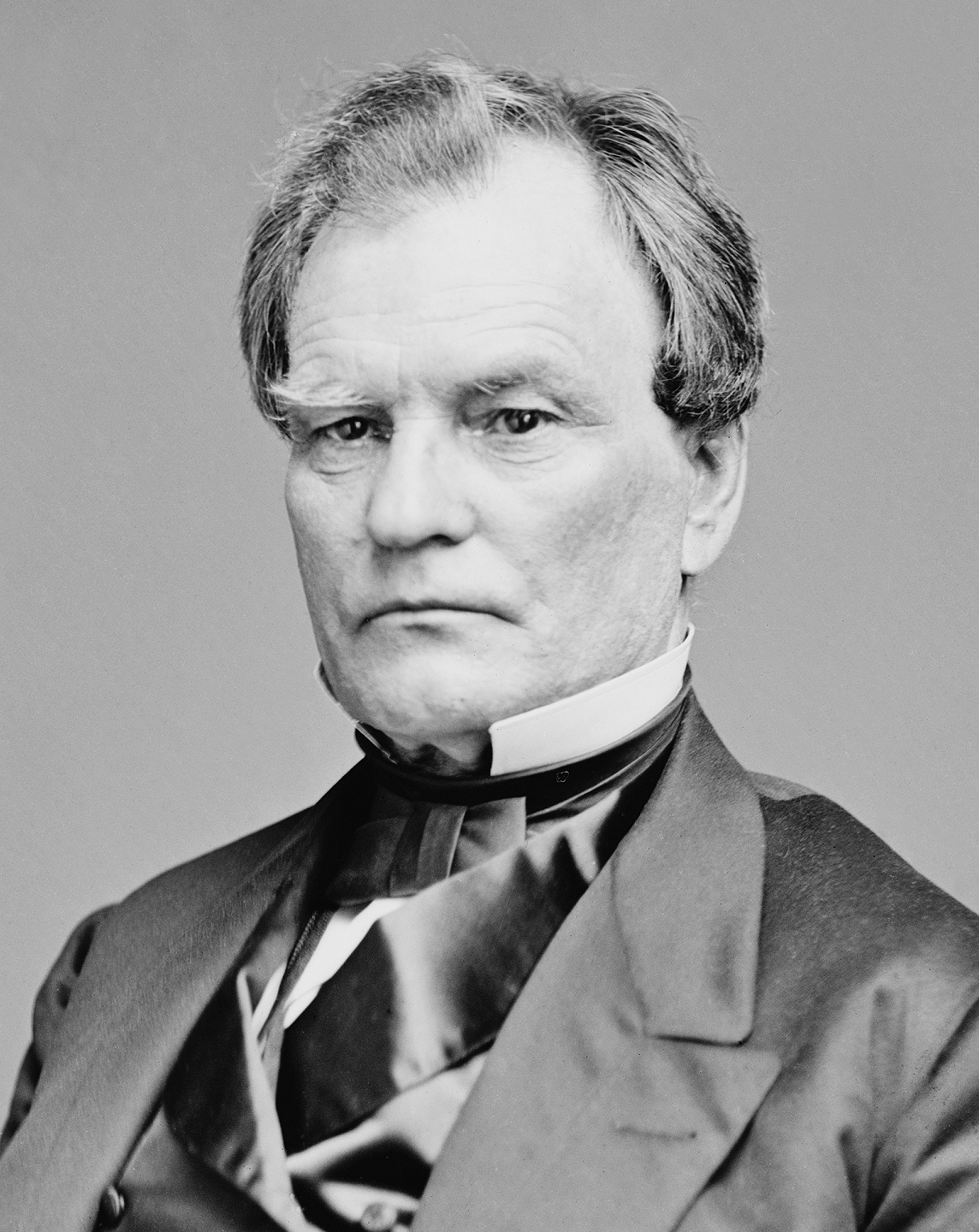
President pro tempore
Benjamin Wade
of Ohio
(Speculated)

As Republicans convened in Chicago in May 1868, Grant had no serious opposition for the nomination; he was nominated unanimously on the first ballot.

Presidential Balloting
Candidate	1st
Grant	648
Absent	2

Presidential Balloting / 2nd Day of Convention (May 21, 1868)

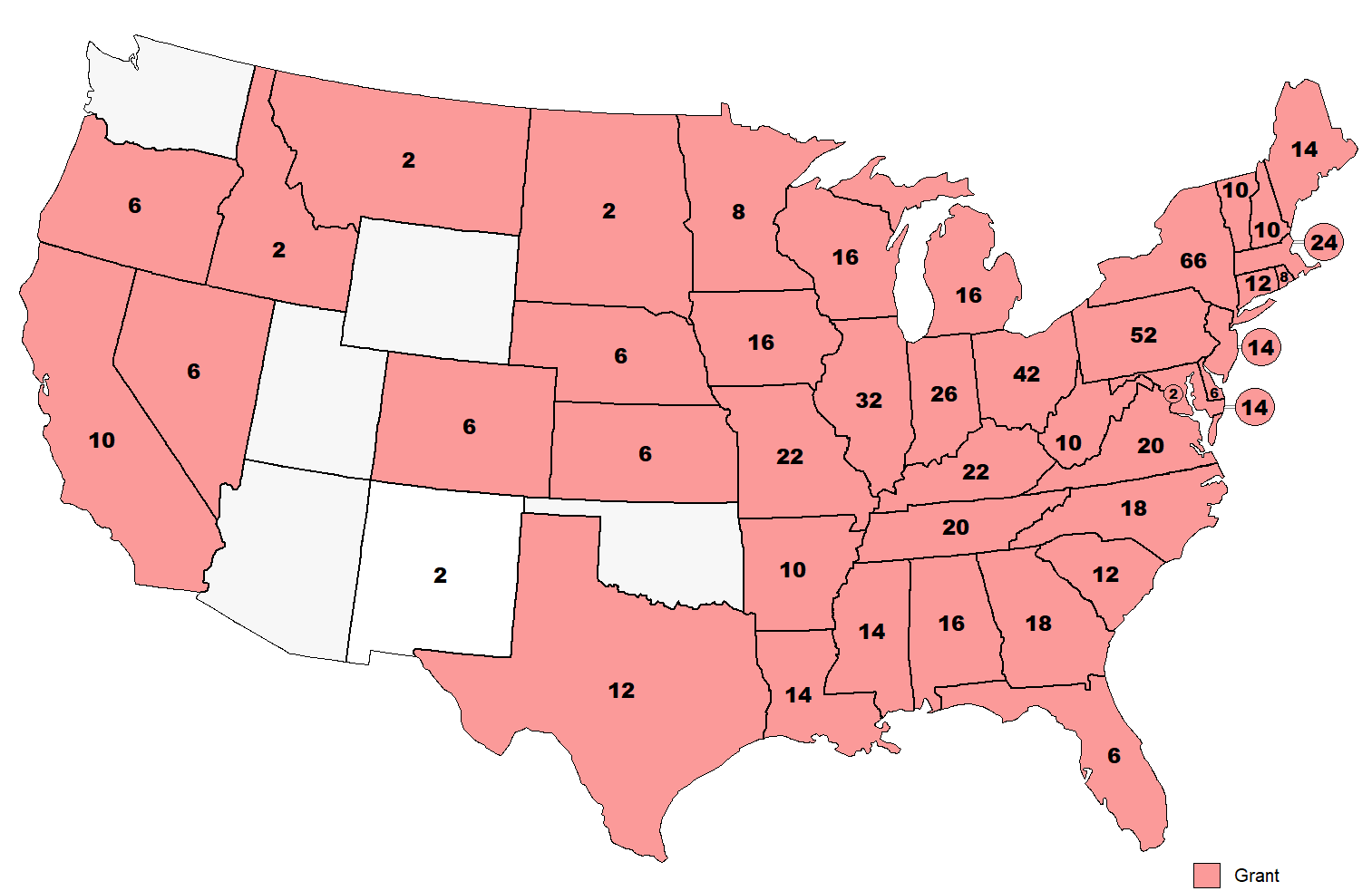
1st
Presidential Ballot

== Vice presidential nomination ==
=== Vice presidential candidates ===
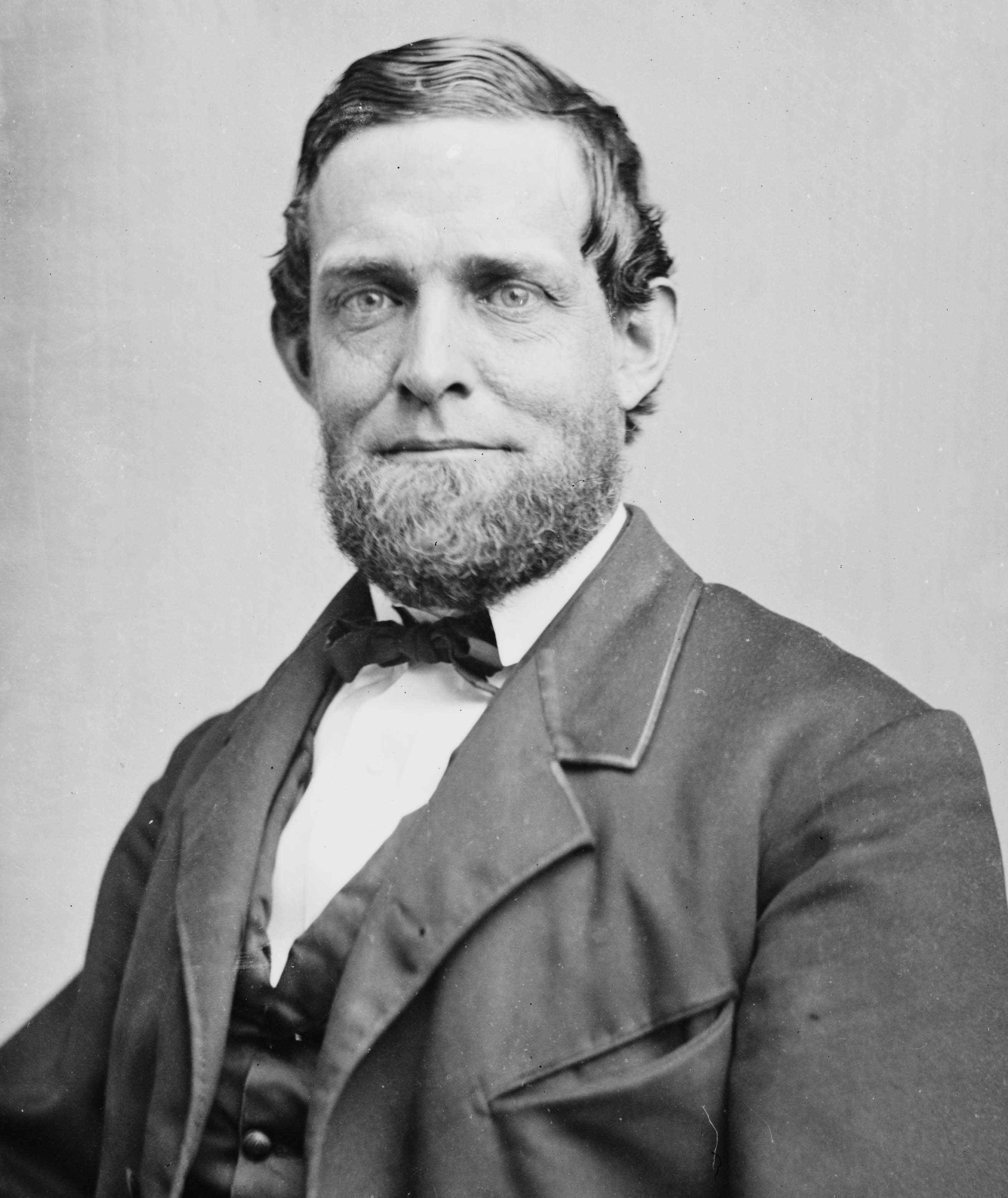
Speaker
Schuyler Colfax
of Indiana

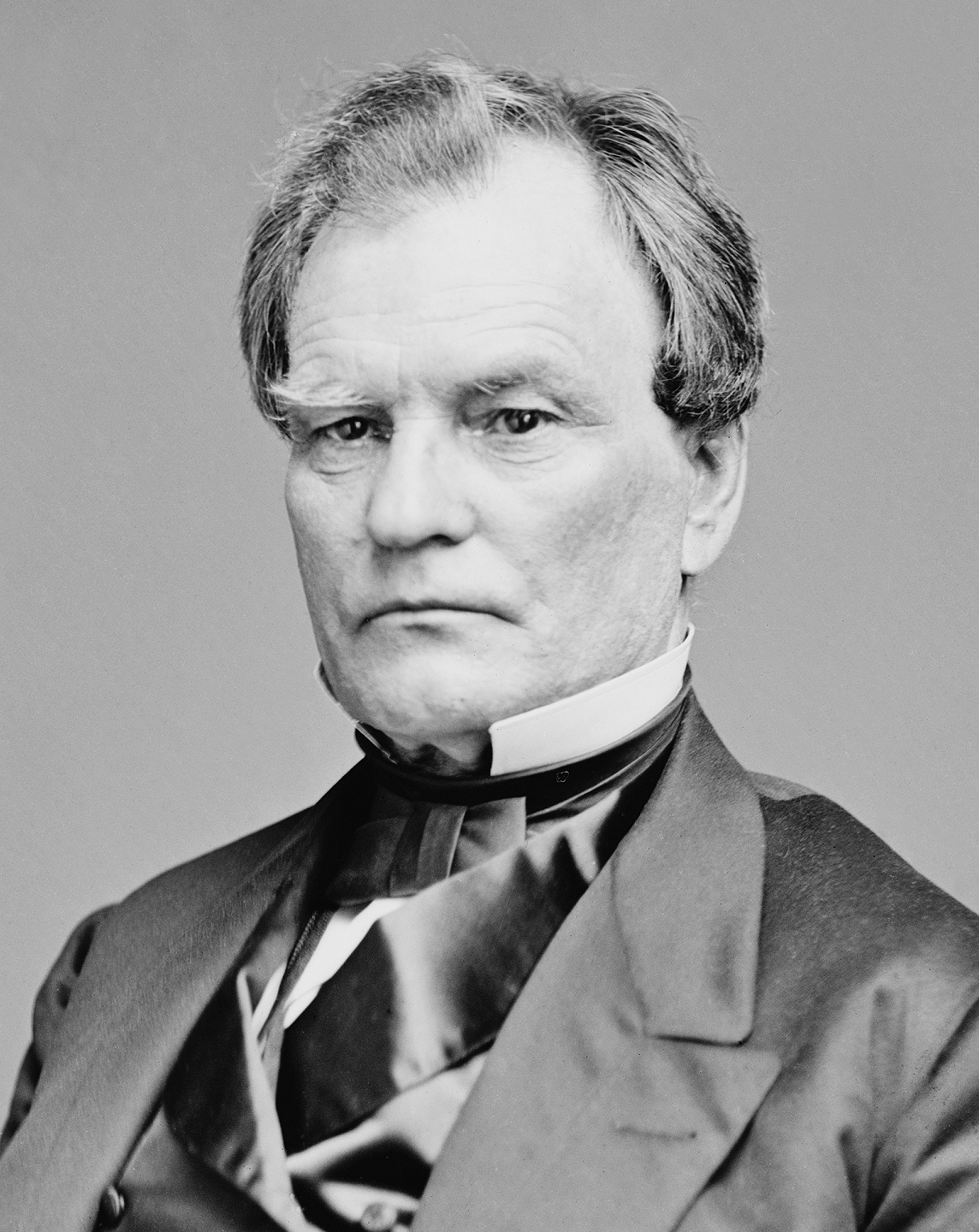
President Pro Tempore
Benjamin Wade
of Ohio

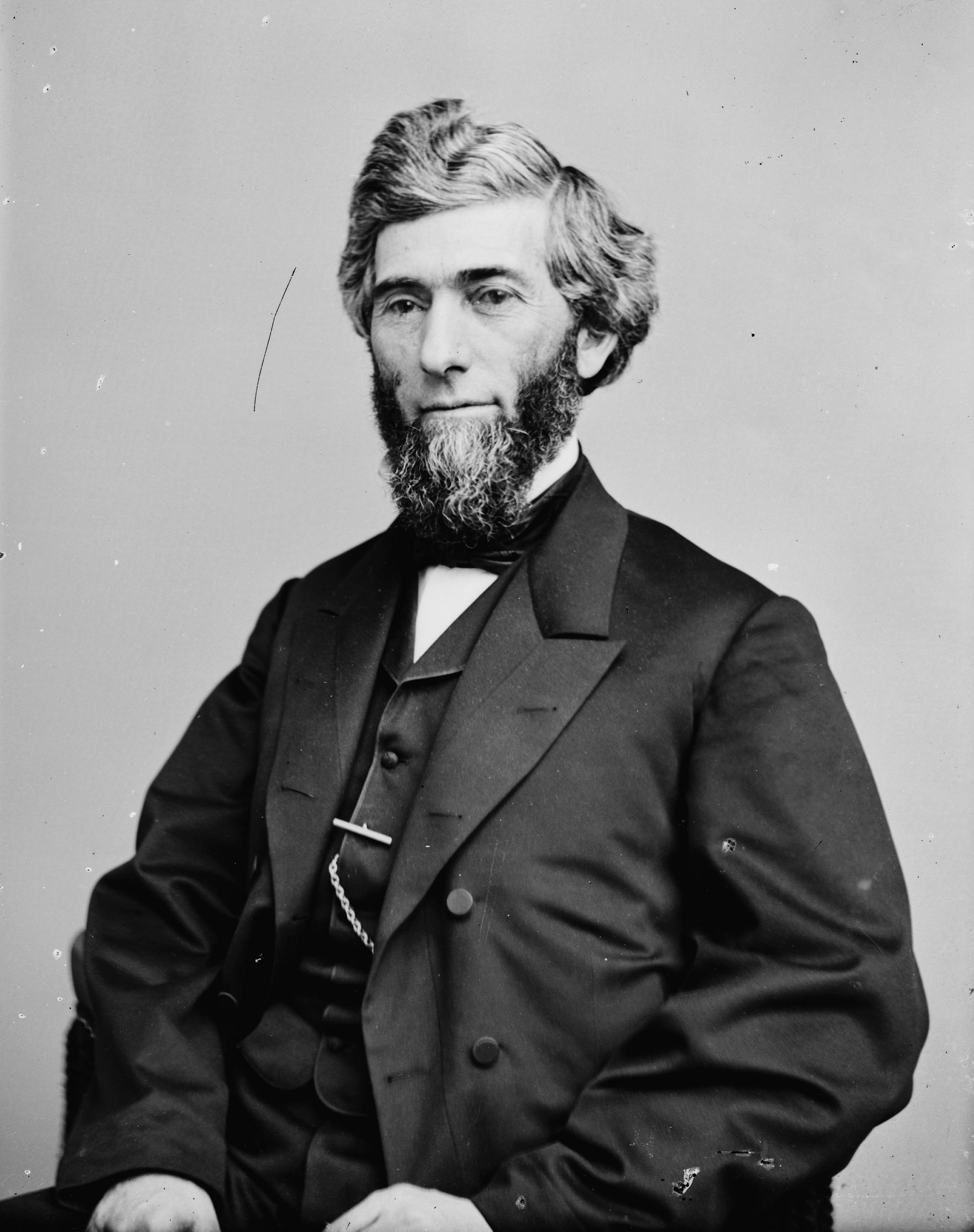
Governor
Reuben Fenton
of New York

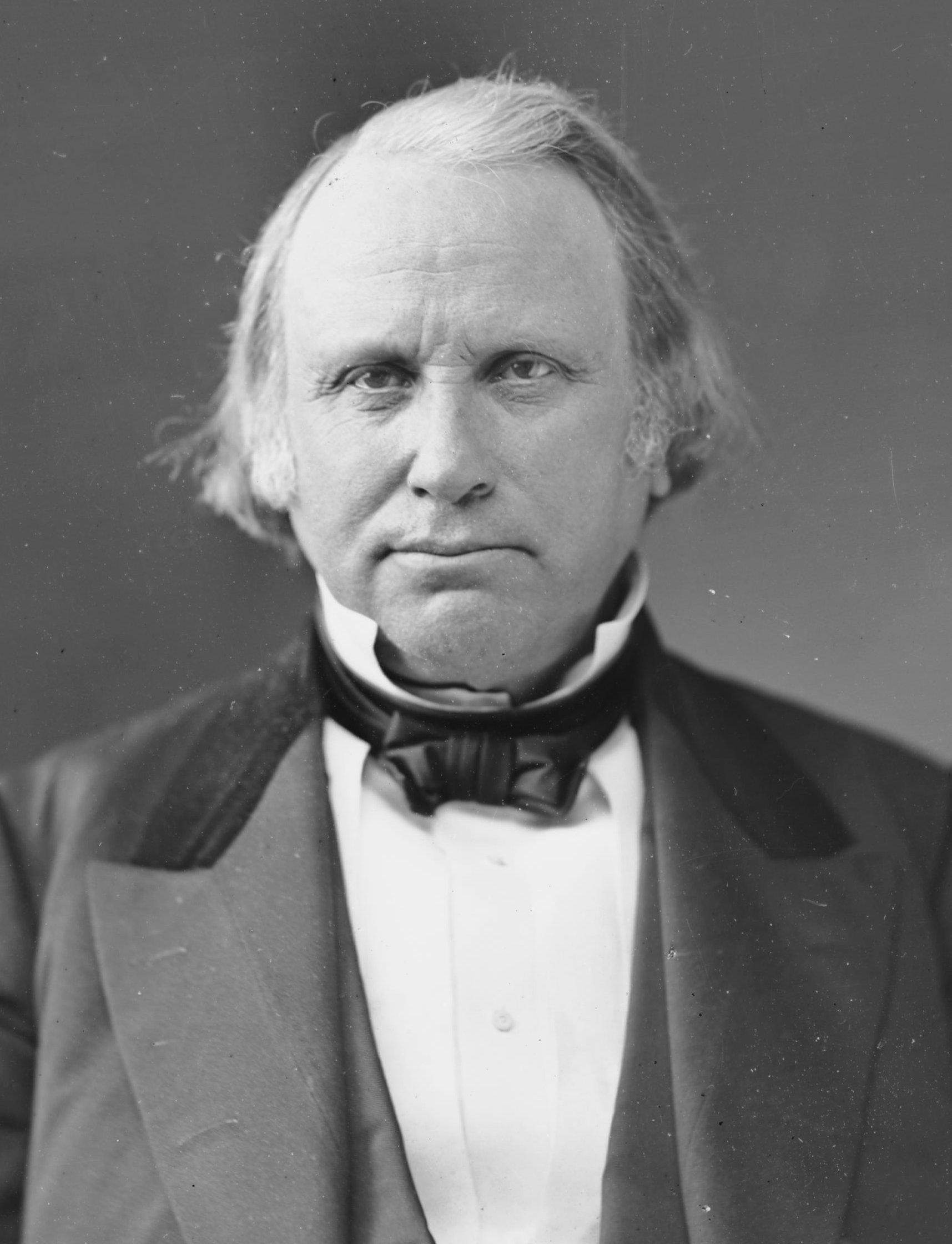
Senator
Henry Wilson
of Massachusetts

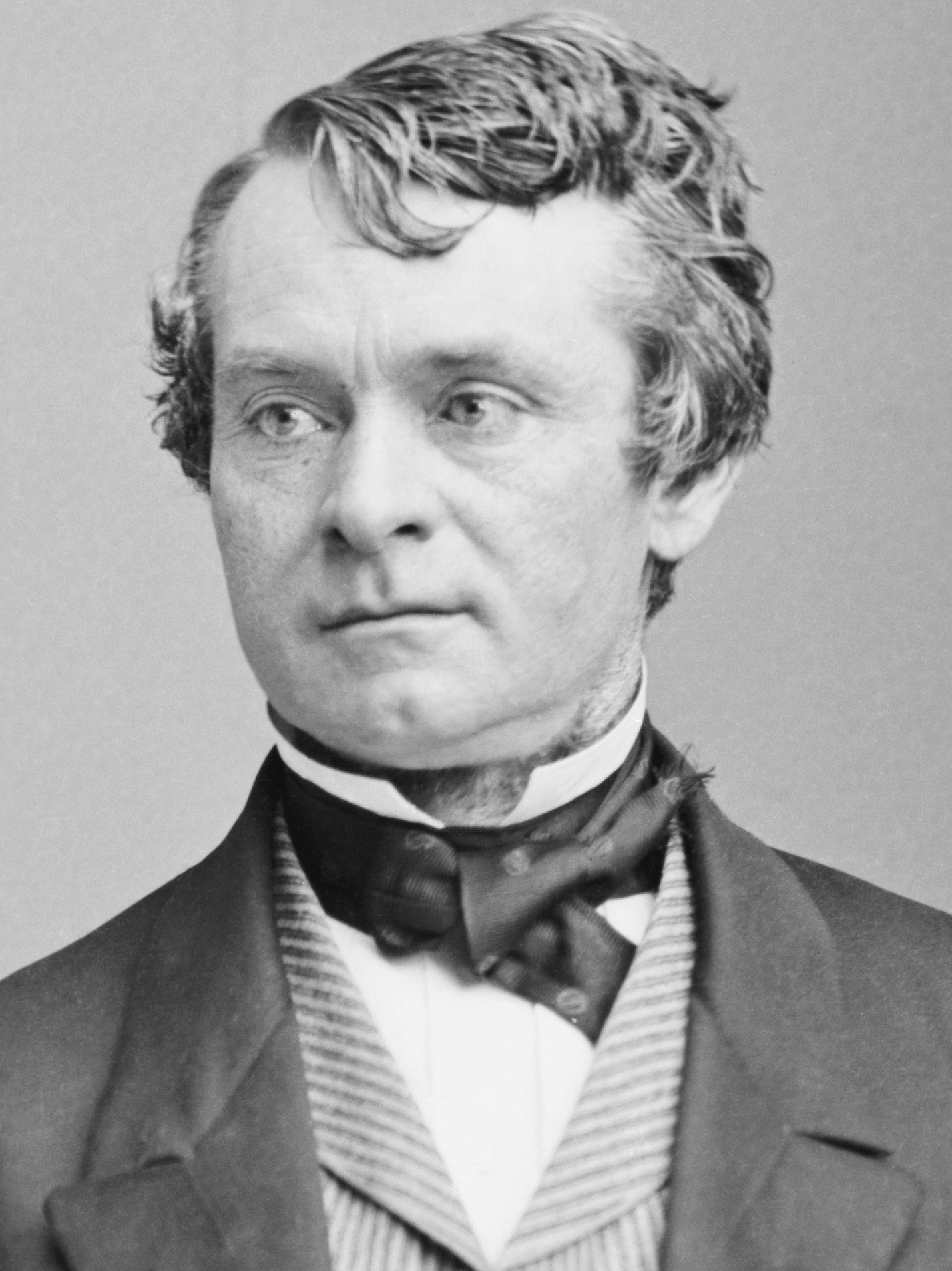
Former Governor
Andrew Curtin
of Pennsylvania

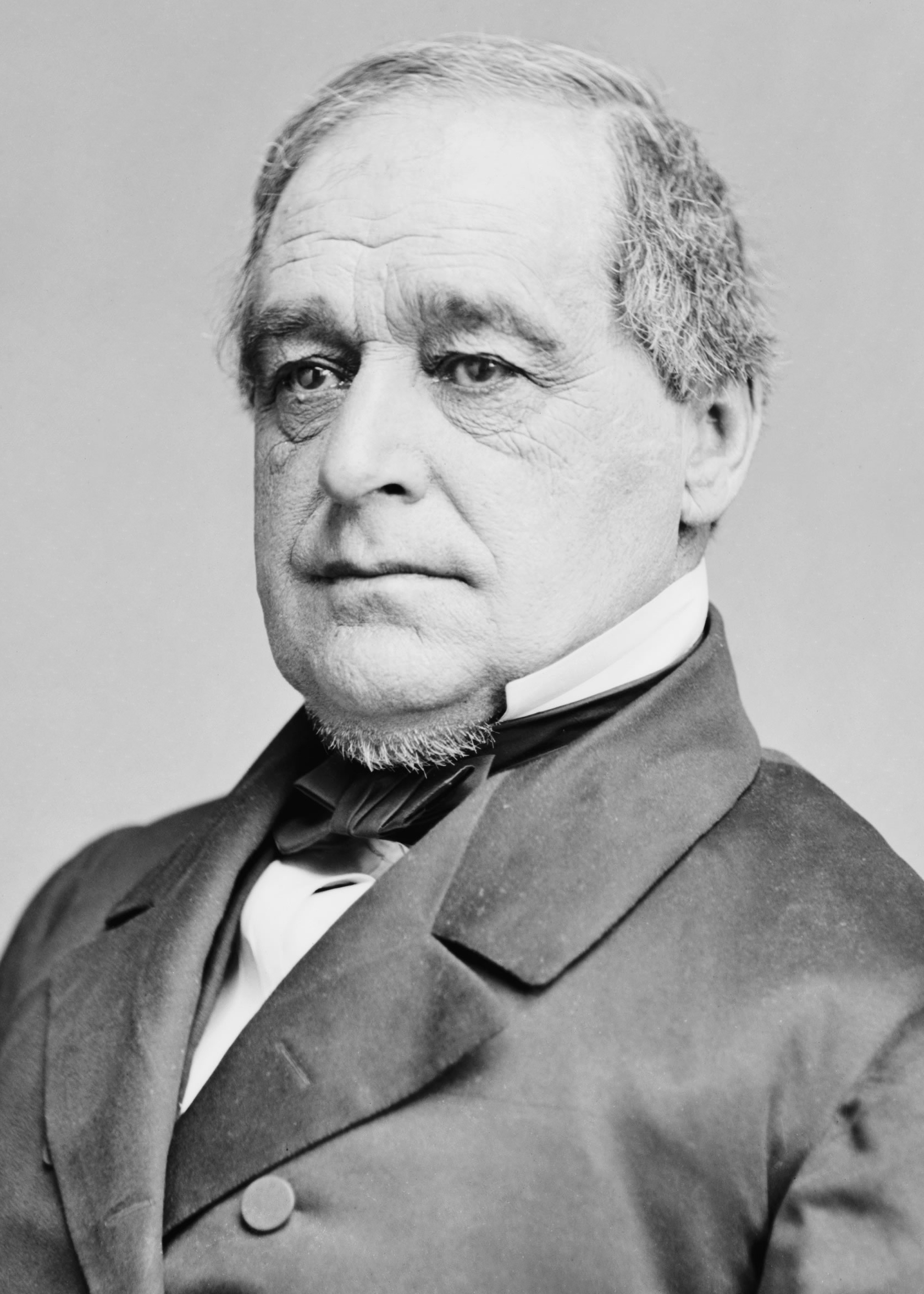
Former Vice President
Hannibal Hamlin
of Maine

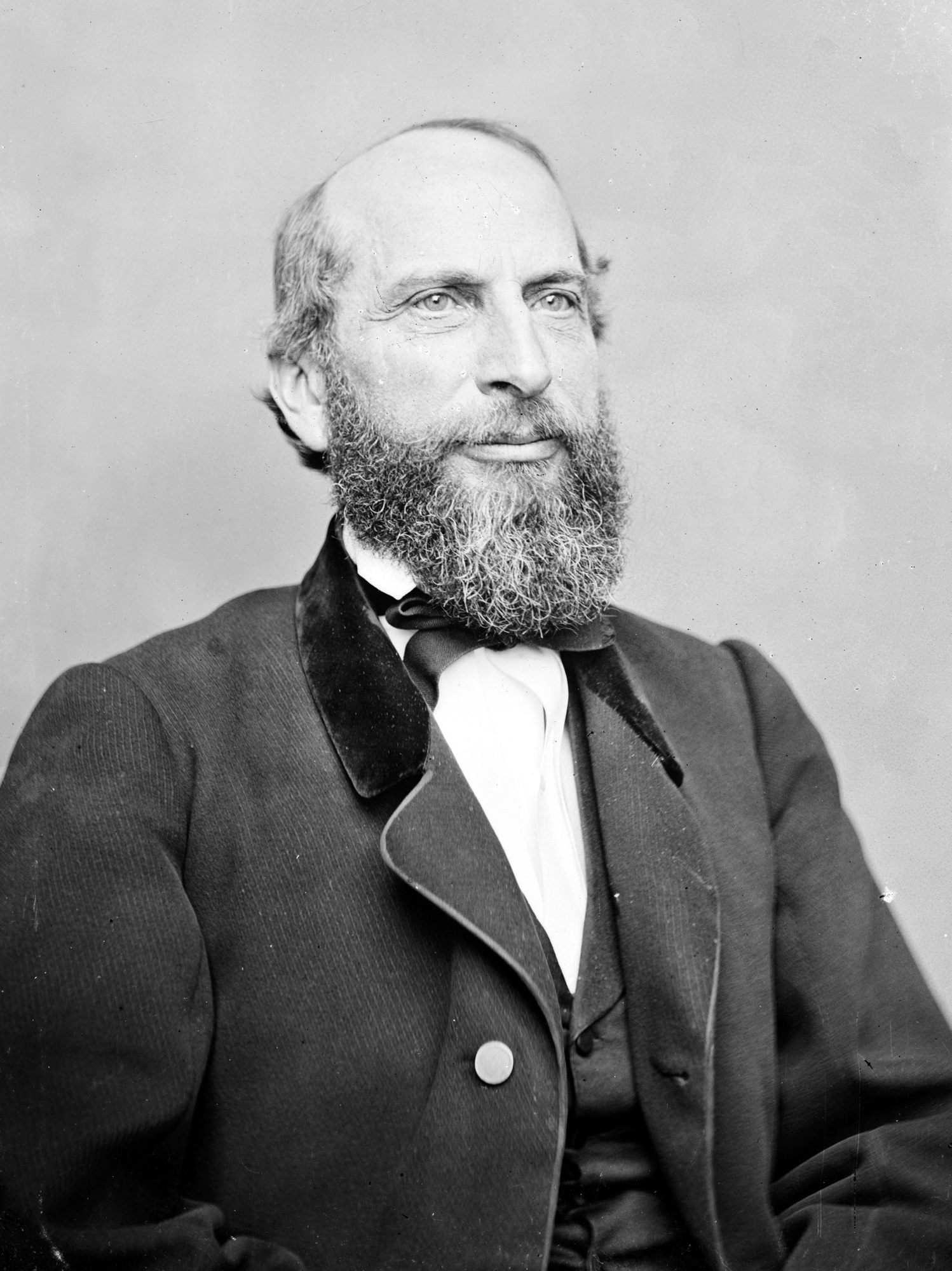
Former Attorney General James Speed
of Kentucky

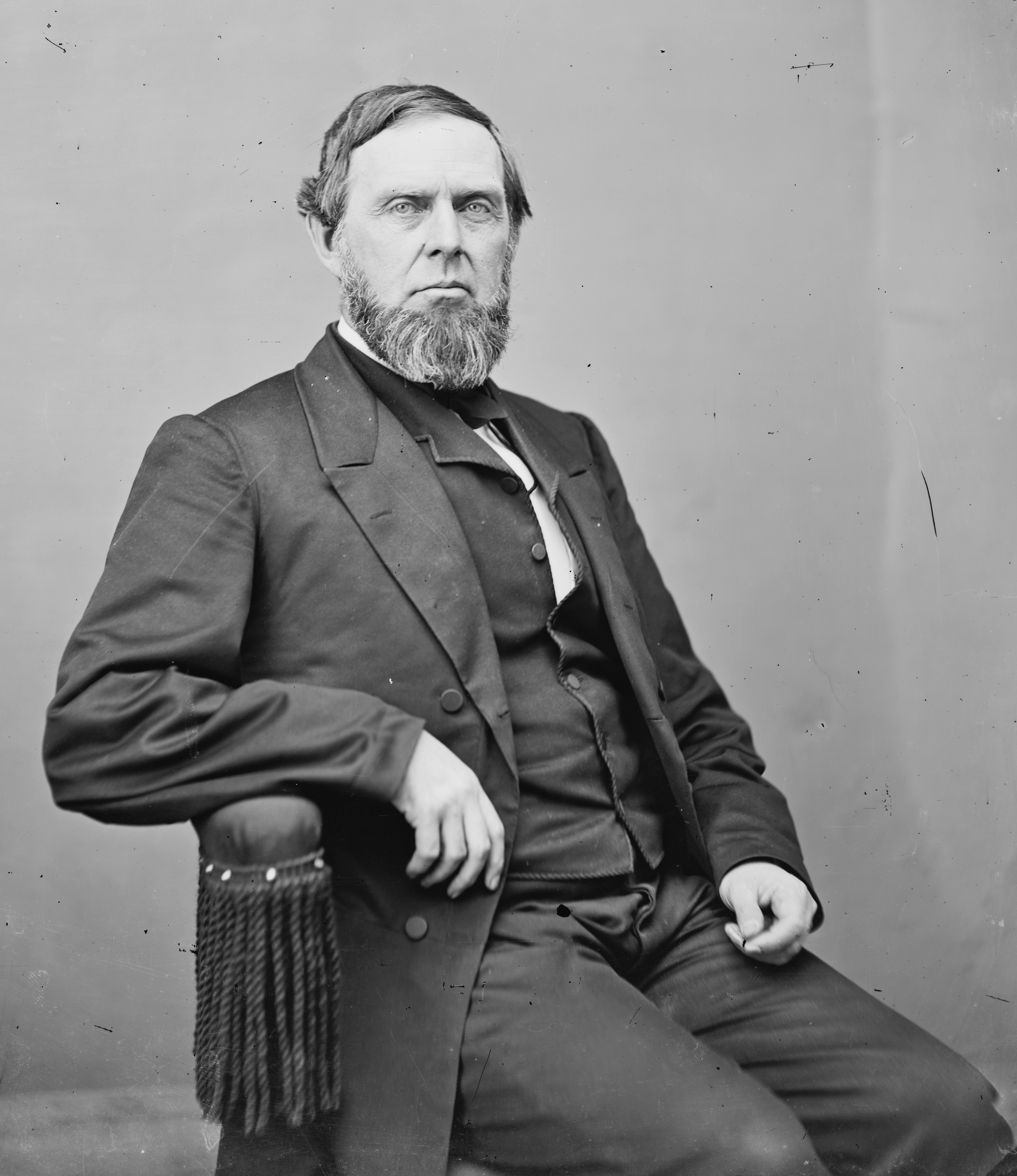
Senator
James Harlan
of Iowa

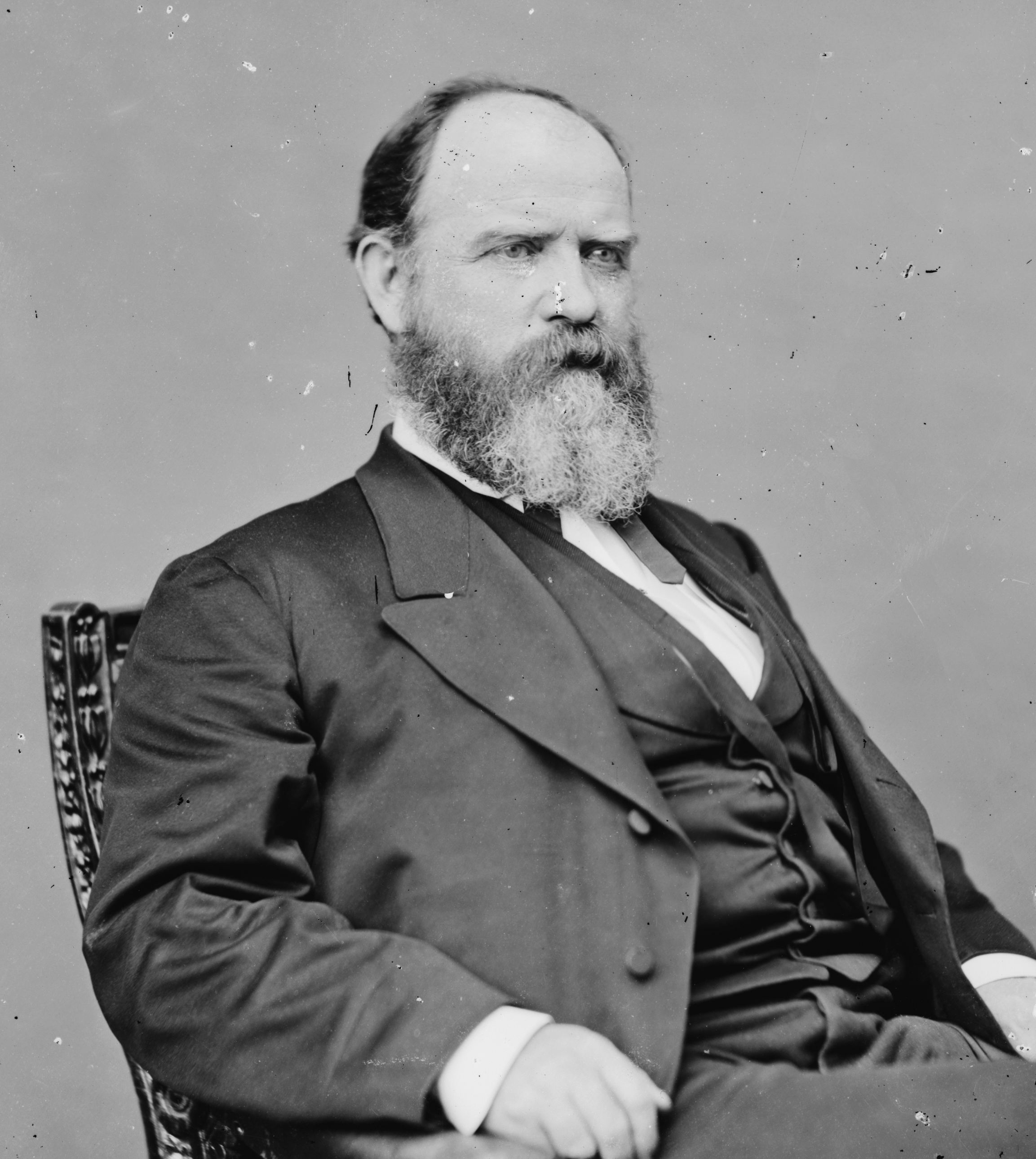
Former Senator
John Creswell
of Maryland

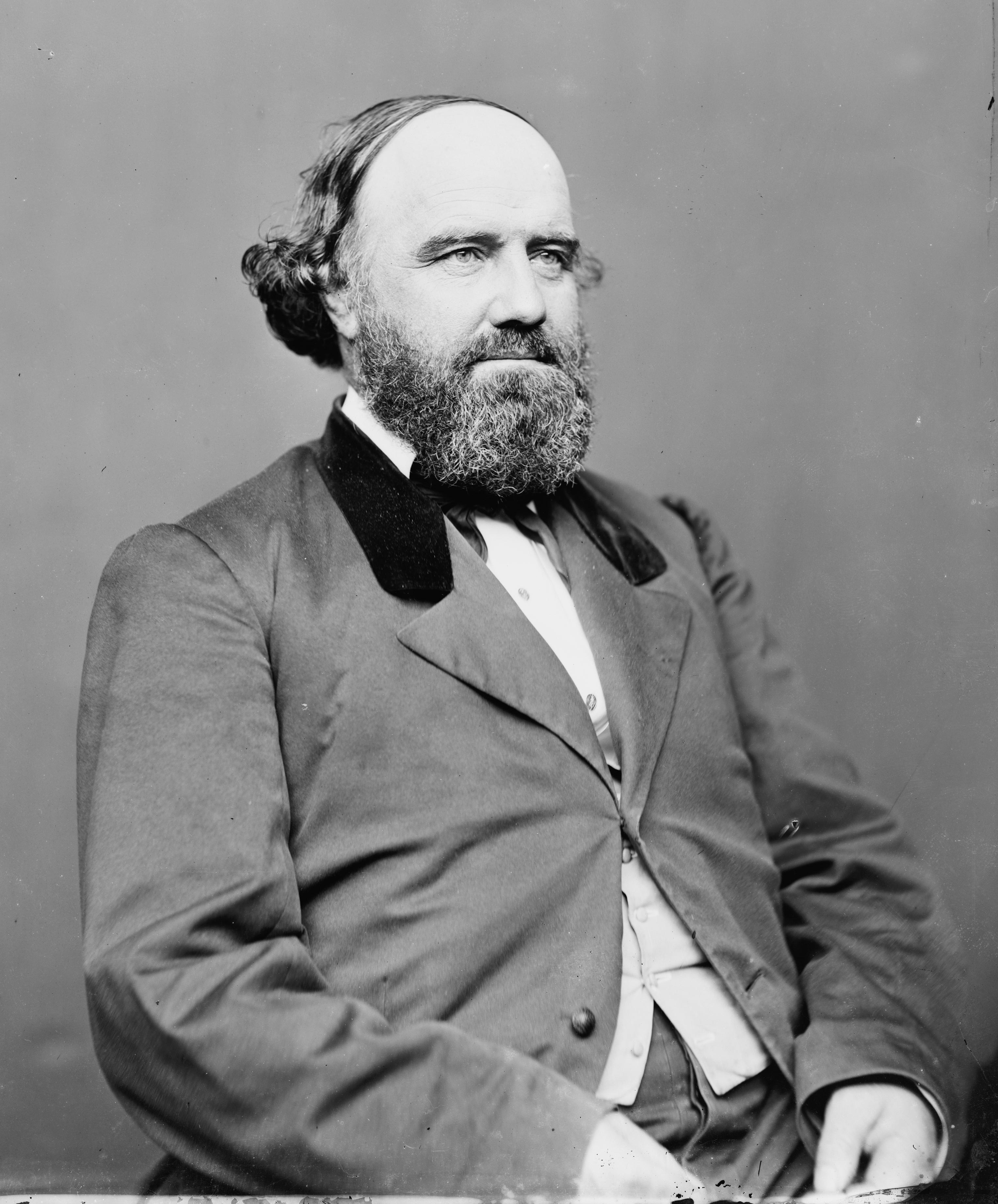
Senator
Samuel C. Pomeroy
of Kansas

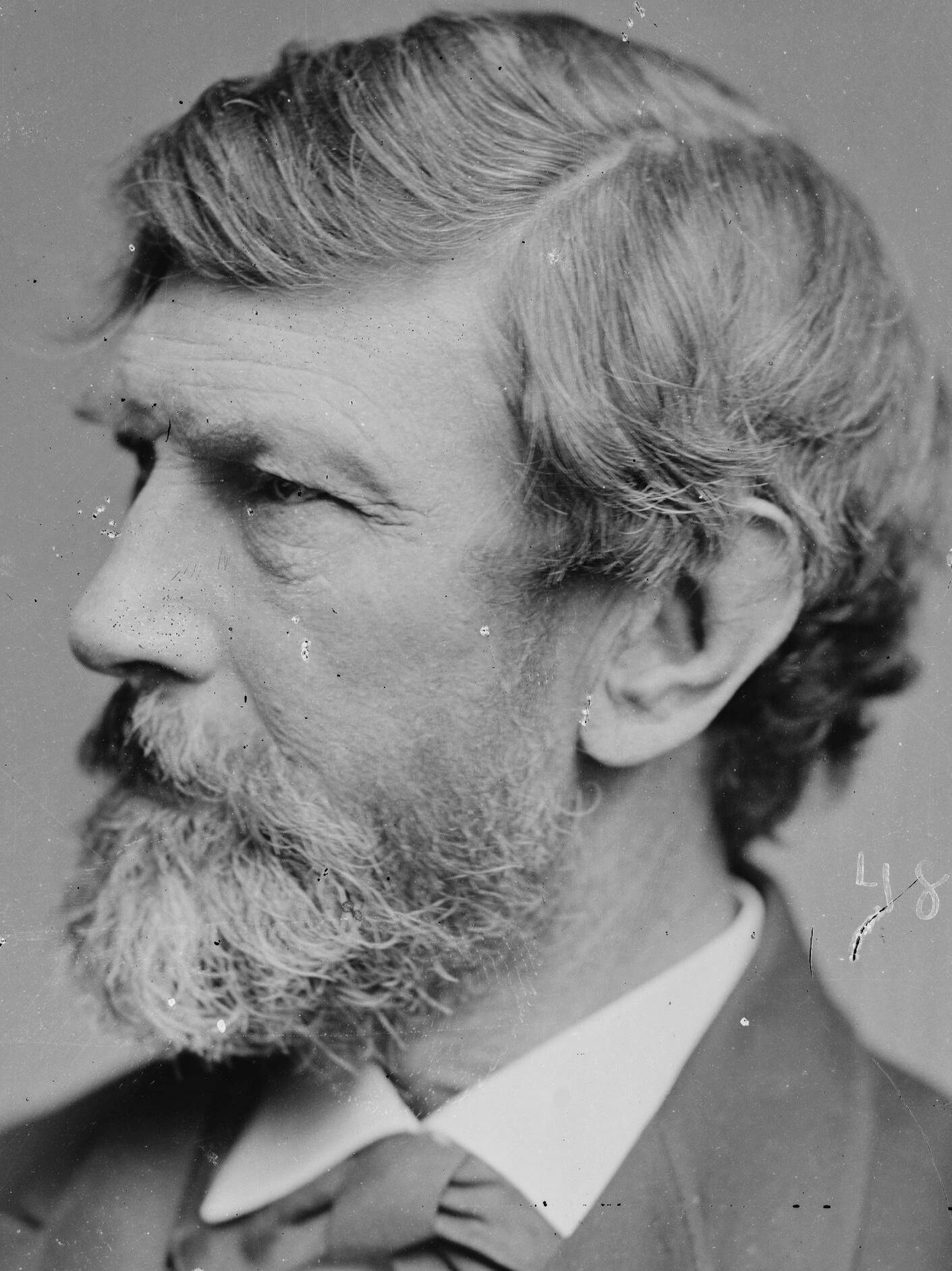
Representative
William D. Kelley
of Pennsylvania
(Improper Nomination)

Colfax was selected for vice president on the fifth ballot. Colfax was popular among Republicans for his friendly character, party loyalty, and Radical views on Reconstruction. Wilson received a large amount of support from the southern delegations.

Vice Presidential Ballot
	1st	2nd	3rd	4th	5th (Before Shifts)	5th (After Shifts)
Colfax	115	145	165	186	226	541
Wade	147	170	178	206	207	38
Fenton	126	144	139	144	139	69
Wilson	119	114	101	87	56	0
Curtin	51	45	40	0	0	0
Hamlin	28	30	25	25	20	0
Speed	22	0	0	0	0	0
Harlan	16	0	0	0	0	0
Creswell	14	0	0	0	0	0
Pomeroy	6	0	0	0	0	0
Kelley	4	0	0	0	0	0
Absent	2	2	2	2	2	2

Vice Presidential Balloting / 2nd Day of Convention (May 21, 1868)

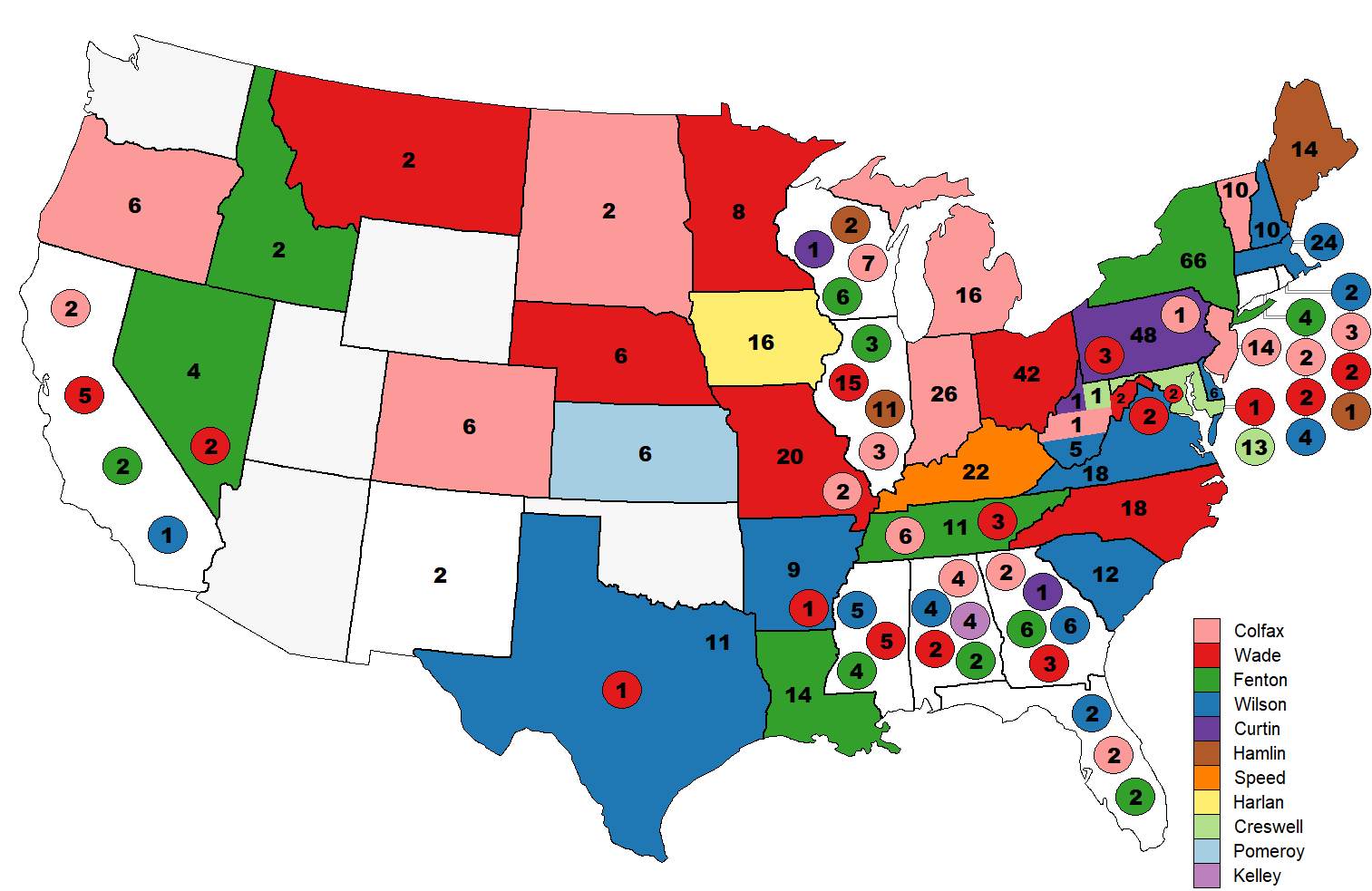
1st
Vice Presidential Ballot

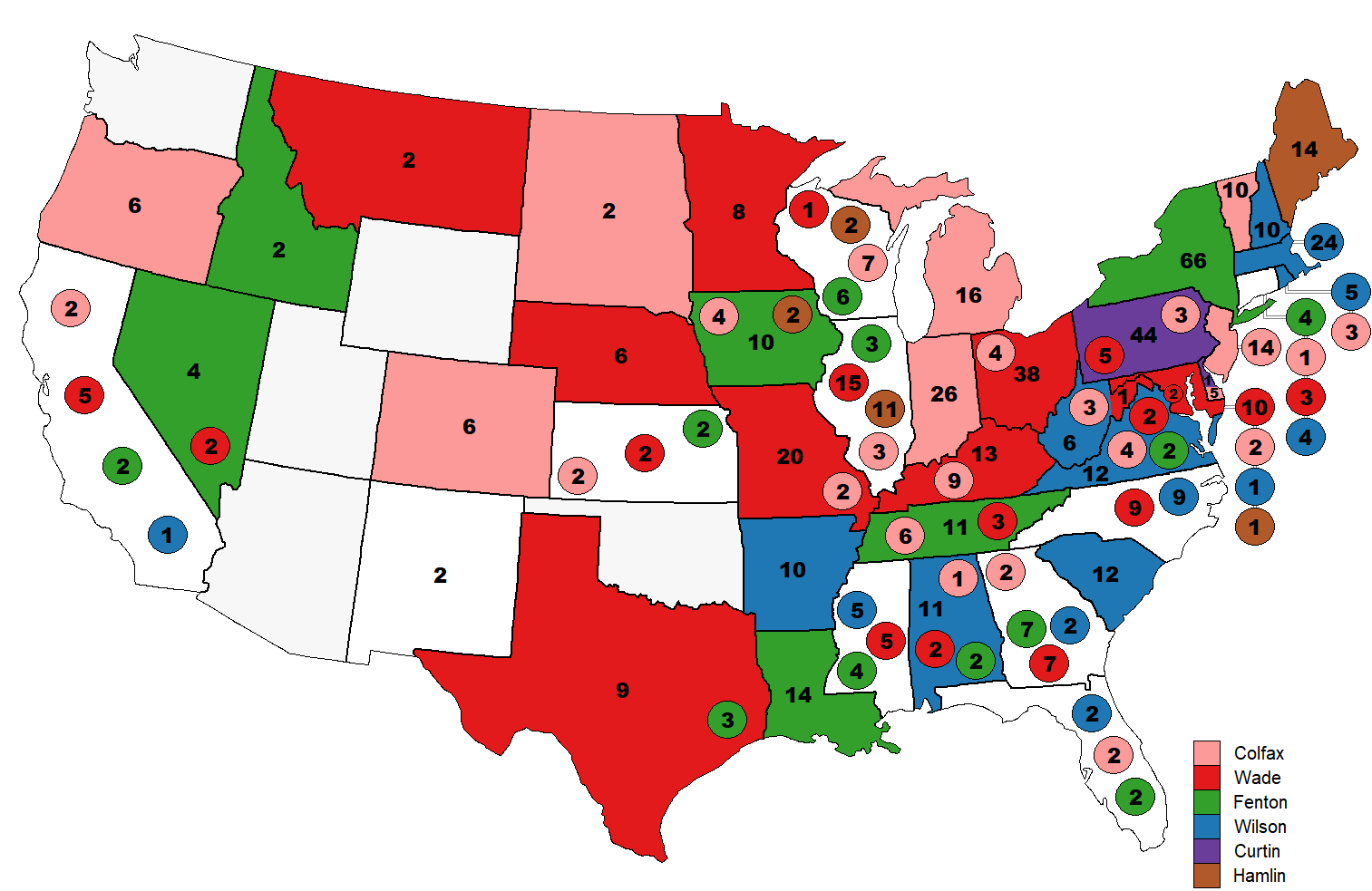
2nd
Vice Presidential Ballot

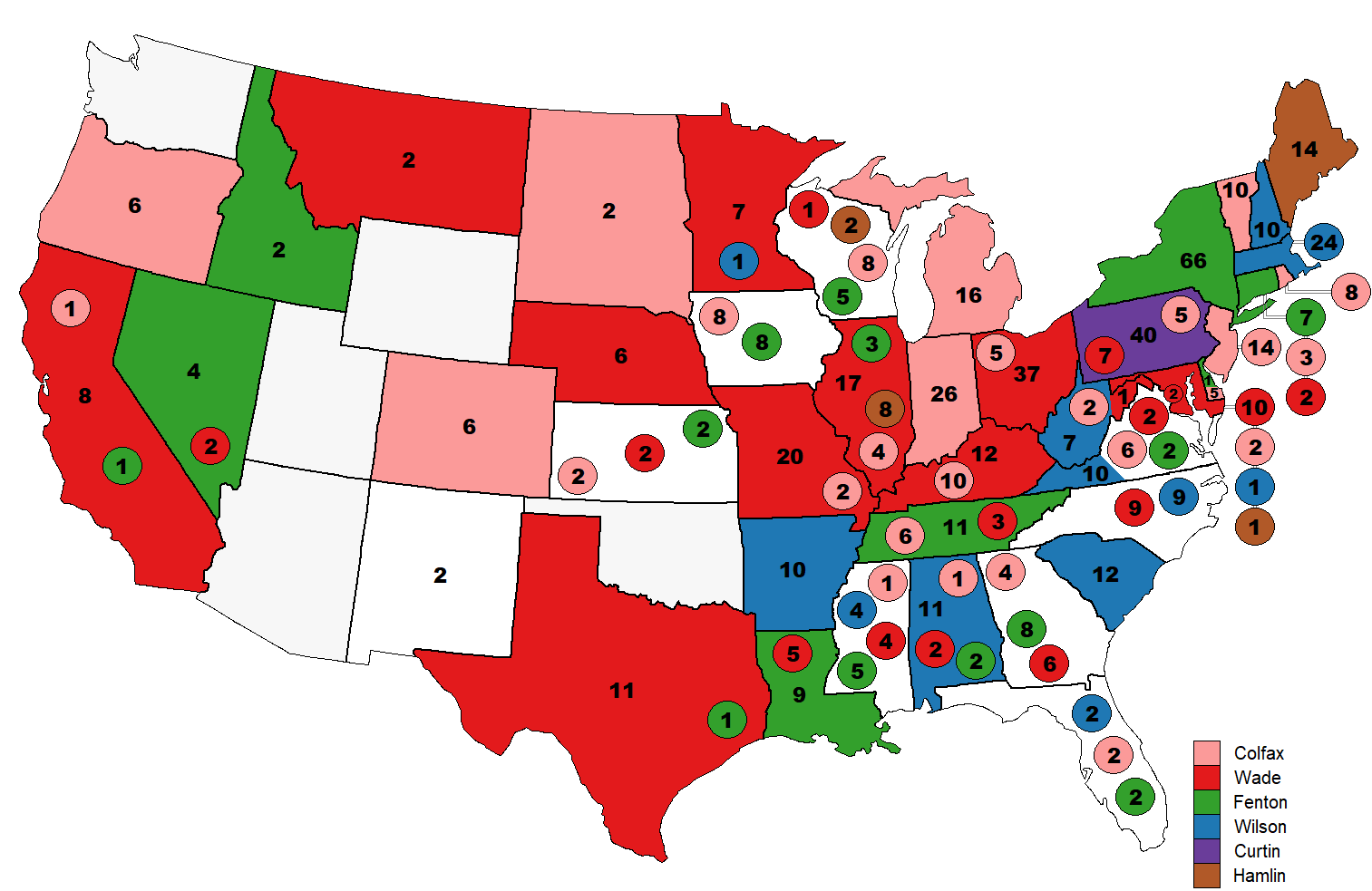
3rd
Vice Presidential Ballot

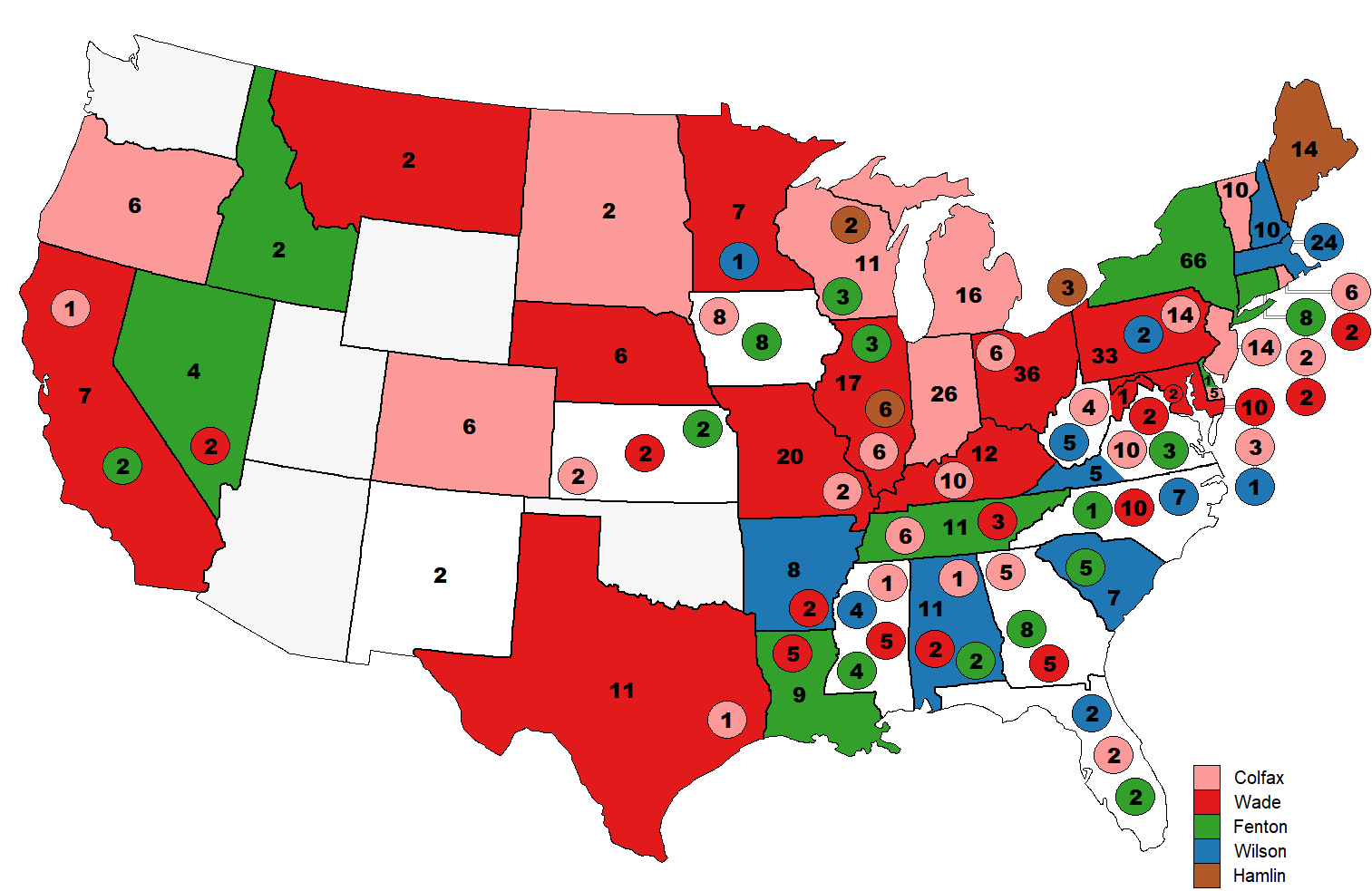
4th
Vice Presidential Ballot

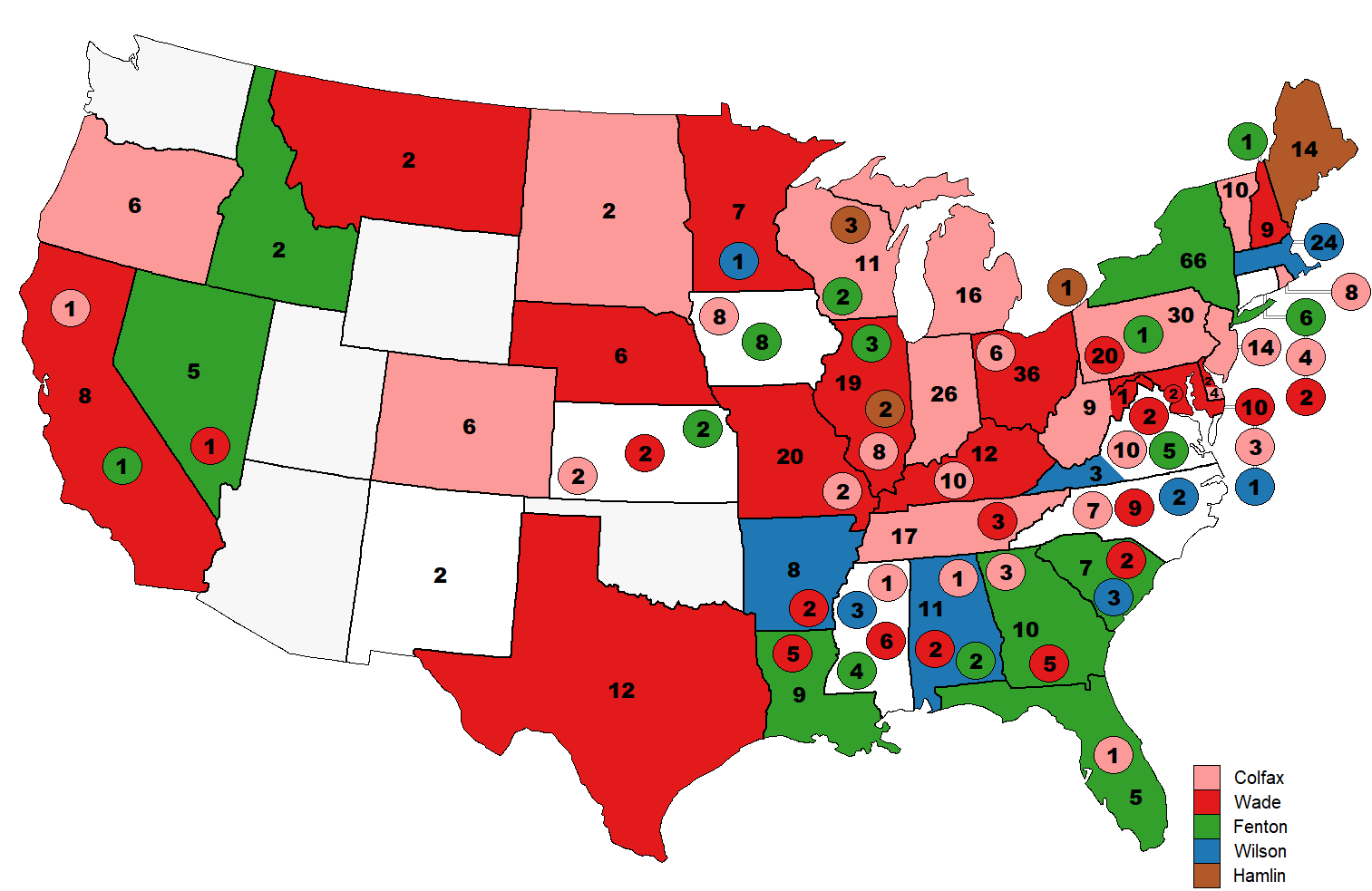
5th
Vice Presidential Ballot
(Before Shifts)

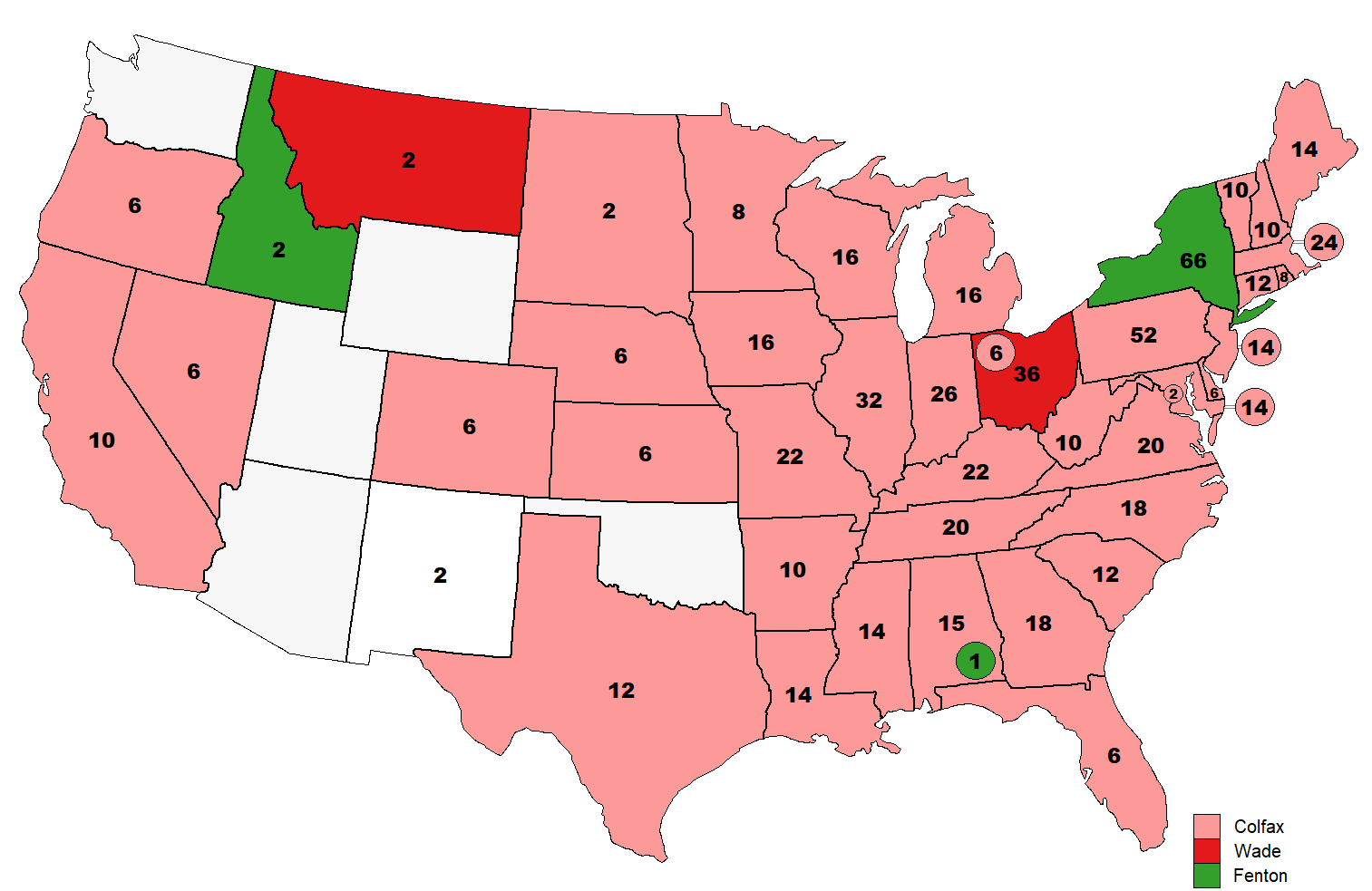
5th
Vice Presidential Ballot
(After Shifts)

== See also ==
- 1868 United States presidential election
- 1868 Democratic National Convention
- History of the United States Republican Party
- List of Republican National Conventions
- United States presidential nominating convention

== Works cited ==
- Abbott, Richard (1986). The Republican Party and the South, 1855-1877: The First Southern Strategy. University of North Carolina Press. ISBN 0807816809.

Preceded by 1864; Baltimore	Republican National Conventions	Succeeded by 1872; Philadelphia
