= Terence J. Quinn =

American politician (1836–1878)

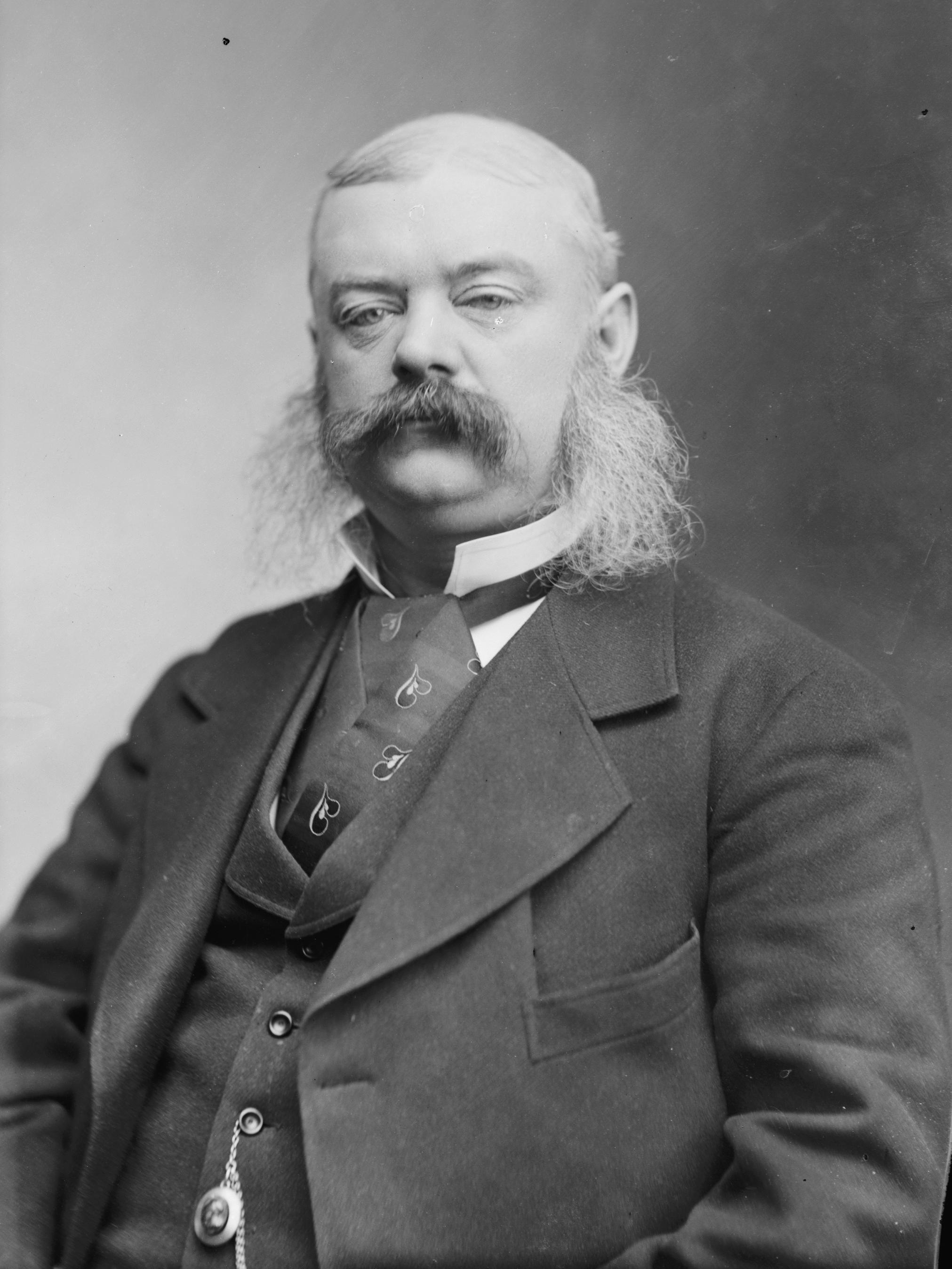
- Brady-Handy collection portrait of Quinn, taken between 1865 and 1880

Member of the U.S. House of Representatives from New York's 16th district
- In office Mrch 4, 1877 – June 18, 1878
- Preceded by: Charles H. Adams
- Succeeded by: John Mosher Bailey

Member of the New York State Assembly
- In office 1873

Personal details
- Born: Terence John Quinn; October 16, 1836 Albany, New York, US
- Died: June 18, 1878 (aged 41) Albany, New York, US
- Resting place: St. Agnes Cemetery
- Occupation: Politician

Military service
- Allegiance: Union
- Rank: Lieutenant colonel
- Unit: 25th New York Infantry Regiment
- Battles/wars: American Civil War

Terence John Quinn (October 16, 1836 – June 18, 1878) was an American politician. A Democrat, he was a member of the United States House of Representatives from New York.

== Biography ==
Quinn was born on October 16, 1836, in Albany, New York. He was educated at private schools, then at The Albany Academy. He became a brewer as a young man alongside his father and continued working in the industry following the war. He was a partner in the Beverwyck Brewery, alongside Michael N. Nolan.

During the American Civil War, Quinn served as a lieutenant colonel in Company B of the 25th New York Infantry Regiment, of the Union army. According to a eulogy by Speaker Samuel J. Randall, he captured the first prisoner of war in the conflict, during the aftermath of Elmer E. Ellsworth's death. He helped defend Washington, D.C. in April 1861, after which he was assigned to Arlington Heights, Illinois. His service was caught short by a fever; it is believed he never fully recovered from this fever.

Quinn was a Democrat. From 1869 to 1872, he was a member of the Albany common council. In 1873, he represented the Albany County 3rd district in the New York State Assembly. He was a member of the United States House of Representatives from March 4, 1877, until his death, representing New York's 16th district. Politically, he leaned liberal. He was against oppression.

Quinn was married. In his eulogy, Randall characterized him as a strong orator. He died on June 18, 1878, aged 41, in Albany, from a severe common cold. He was buried at St. Agnes Cemetery, in Menands.

== See also ==
- List of members of the United States Congress who died in office (1790–1899)

New York State Assembly
Preceded by John W. Van Valkenburgh	New York State Assembly; Albany County, 3rd District; 1874	Succeeded by Francis W. Vosburgh
U.S. House of Representatives
Preceded by Charles H. Adams	Member of the U.S. House of Representatives from New York's 16th congressional district 1877–1878	Succeeded by John M. Bailey
