= 50th United States Congress =

1887-1889 U.S. Congress

←	49th	51st	→
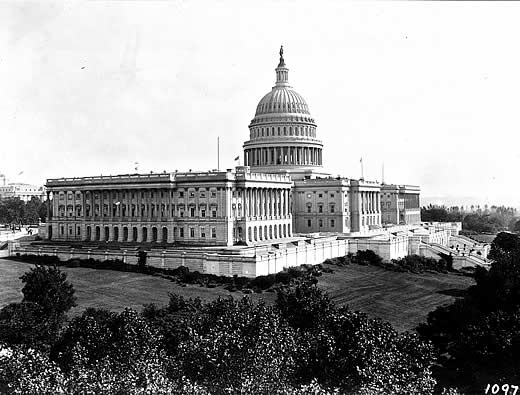
- United States Capitol (1906)

Overview
- Legislative body: United States Congress
- Jurisdiction: United States
- Term: March 4, 1887 – March 4, 1889

Senate
- Members: 76
- President: Vacant
- President pro tempore: John J. Ingalls (R)
- Party control: Republican (through caucus)

House of Representatives
- Members: 325 representatives 8 non-voting delegates
- Speaker: John G. Carlisle (D)
- Party control: Democratic

Sessions
- 1st: December 7, 1887 – October 20, 1888
- 2nd: December 3, 1888 – March 3, 1889

The 50th United States Congress was a meeting of the legislative branch of the United States federal government, consisting of the United States Senate and the United States House of Representatives. It met in Washington, D.C., from March 4, 1887, to March 4, 1889, during the last two years of Grover Cleveland's first presidency. The president vetoed 212 pieces of legislation, the greatest number in a single session of Congress.

The apportionment of seats in the House of Representatives was based on the 1880 United States census. The Senate had a Republican majority, and the House had a Democratic majority.

== Major events ==
- March 11, 1888: The Great Blizzard of 1888 begins along the East Coast of the United States, shutting down commerce and killing more than 400.
- November 6, 1888: 1888 United States presidential election: Democratic Party incumbent Grover Cleveland wins the popular vote, but loses the Electoral College vote to Republican challenger Benjamin Harrison, therefore losing the election.
- February 15, 1889: The Secretary of Agriculture is raised to a Cabinet-level position.

== Major legislation ==
- October 8, 1888: Chinese Exclusion Act (Scott Act)
- January 14, 1889: Nelson Act of 1889
- February 22, 1889: Enabling Act of 1889, Sess. 2, ch. 180, 25 Stat. 676

== Party summary ==
The count below identifies party affiliations at the beginning of the first session of this Congress, and includes members from vacancies and newly admitted states, when they were first seated. Changes resulting from subsequent replacements are shown below in the "Changes in membership" section.

=== Senate ===
	Party (shading shows control)			Total	Vacant
	Democratic (D)	Readjuster (RA)	Republican (R)	Total	Vacant
End of previous congress	34	2	40	76	0
Begin	35	1	38	74	2
End	37	1	38	76	0
Final voting share	48.7%	1.3%	50.0%		
Beginning of next congress	37	0	39	76	0

=== House of Representatives ===
	Party (shading shows control)						Total	Vacant
	Democratic (D)	Labor (L)	Greenback (GB)	Independent (I)	Independent Republican (IR)	Republican (R)	Total	Vacant
End of previous congress	180	0	1	0	0	138	319	5
Begin	168	2	1	1	2	150	324	1
End	167	2	1	1	2	151	324	1
Final voting share	51.5%	0.6%	0.3%	0.3%	0.6%	46.6%		
Beginning of next congress	160	0	0	0	0	164	324	1

== Leadership ==
=== Senate ===
- President: Vacant
- President pro tempore: John J. Ingalls (R)
- Republican Conference Chairman: George F. Edmunds
- Democratic Caucus Chairman: James B. Beck

=== House of Representatives ===
- Speaker: John G. Carlisle (D)
- Minority Leader: Thomas B. Reed
- Democratic Caucus Chairman: Samuel S. Cox
- Republican Conference Chairman: Joseph Gurney Cannon
- Democratic Campaign Committee Chairman: John E. Kenna

== Members ==
Skip to House of Representatives, below

=== Senate ===
Senators were elected by the state legislatures every two years, with one-third beginning new six-year terms with each Congress. Preceding the names in the list below are Senate class numbers, which indicate the cycle of their election. In this Congress, Class 1 meant their term began in this Congress, requiring reelection in 1892; Class 2 meant their term ended in this Congress, requiring reelection in 1888; and Class 3 meant their term began in the last Congress, requiring reelection in 1890.

==== Alabama ====
▌2. John T. Morgan (D)
▌3. James L. Pugh (D)

==== Arkansas ====
▌2. James H. Berry (D)
▌3. James K. Jones (D)

==== California ====
▌1. George Hearst (D)
▌3. Leland Stanford (R)

==== Colorado ====
▌2. Thomas M. Bowen (R)
▌3. Henry M. Teller (R)

==== Connecticut ====
▌1. Joseph R. Hawley (R)
▌3. Orville H. Platt (R)

==== Delaware ====
▌1. George Gray (D)
▌2. Eli Saulsbury (D)

==== Florida ====
▌1. Samuel Pasco (D), from May 19, 1887
▌3. Wilkinson Call (D)

==== Georgia ====
▌2. Alfred H. Colquitt (D)
▌3. Joseph E. Brown (D)

==== Illinois ====
▌2. Shelby M. Cullom (R)
▌3. Charles B. Farwell (R)

==== Indiana ====
▌1. David Turpie (D)
▌3. Daniel W. Voorhees (D)

==== Iowa ====
▌2. James F. Wilson (R)
▌3. William B. Allison (R)

==== Kansas ====
▌2. Preston B. Plumb (R)
▌3. John J. Ingalls (R)

==== Kentucky ====
▌2. James B. Beck (D)
▌3. Joseph C. S. Blackburn (D)

==== Louisiana ====
▌2. Randall L. Gibson (D)
▌3. James B. Eustis (D)

==== Maine ====
▌1. Eugene Hale (R)
▌2. William P. Frye (R)

==== Maryland ====
▌1. Arthur Pue Gorman (D)
▌3. Ephraim K. Wilson II (D)

==== Massachusetts ====
▌1. Henry L. Dawes (R)
▌2. George F. Hoar (R)

==== Michigan ====
▌1. Francis B. Stockbridge (R)
▌2. Thomas W. Palmer (R)

==== Minnesota ====
▌1. Cushman K. Davis (R)
▌2. Dwight M. Sabin (R)

==== Mississippi ====
▌1. James Z. George (D)
▌2. Edward C. Walthall (D)

==== Missouri ====
▌1. Francis Cockrell (D)
▌3. George G. Vest (D)

==== Nebraska ====
▌1. Algernon S. Paddock (R)
▌2. Charles F. Manderson (R)

==== Nevada ====
▌1. William M. Stewart (R)
▌3. John P. Jones (R)

==== New Hampshire ====
▌2. Person C. Cheney (R), until June 14, 1887

▌William E. Chandler (R), from June 14, 1887

▌3. Henry W. Blair (R)

==== New Jersey ====
▌1. Rufus Blodgett (D)
▌2. John R. McPherson (D)

==== New York ====
▌1. Frank Hiscock (R)
▌3. William M. Evarts (R)

==== North Carolina ====
▌2. Matt W. Ransom (D)
▌3. Zebulon B. Vance (D)

==== Ohio ====
▌1. John Sherman (R)
▌3. Henry B. Payne (D)

==== Oregon ====
▌2. Joseph N. Dolph (R)
▌3. John H. Mitchell (R)

==== Pennsylvania ====
▌1. Matthew S. Quay (R)
▌3. J. Donald Cameron (R)

==== Rhode Island ====
▌1. Nelson W. Aldrich (R)
▌2. Jonathan Chace (R)

==== South Carolina ====
▌2. Matthew C. Butler (D)
▌3. Wade Hampton III (D)

==== Tennessee ====
▌1. William B. Bate (D)
▌2. Isham G. Harris (D)

==== Texas ====
▌1. John H. Reagan (D)
▌2. Richard Coke (D)

==== Vermont ====
▌1. George F. Edmunds (R)
▌3. Justin S. Morrill (R)

==== Virginia ====
▌1. John W. Daniel (D)
▌2. Harrison H. Riddleberger (RA)

==== West Virginia ====
▌1. Charles J. Faulkner Jr. (D), from May 5, 1887
▌2. John E. Kenna (D)

==== Wisconsin ====
▌1. Philetus Sawyer (R)
▌3. John C. Spooner (R)

Senators' party membership by state at the opening of the 50th Congress in March 1887. The green stripes in Virginia represent Readjuster Harrison H. Riddleberger. 2 Democrats 1 Democrat and 1 Republican 2 Republicans Territories

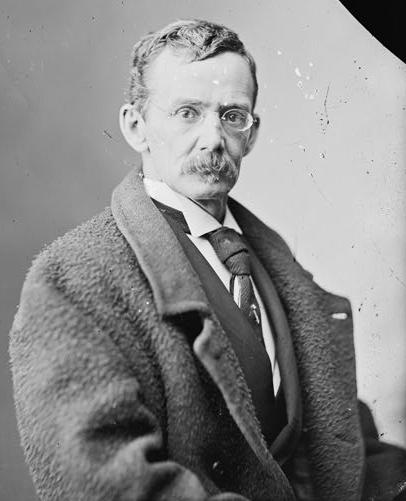
Senate President pro tempore John J. Ingalls

=== House of Representatives ===
The names of representatives are preceded by their district numbers.

==== Alabama ====
▌1. James T. Jones (D)
▌2. Hilary A. Herbert (D)
▌3. William C. Oates (D)
▌4. Alexander C. Davidson (D)
▌5. James E. Cobb (D)
▌6. John H. Bankhead (D)
▌7. William H. Forney (D)
▌8. Joseph Wheeler (D)

==== Arkansas ====
▌1. Poindexter Dunn (D)
▌2. Clifton R. Breckinridge (D)
▌3. Thomas C. McRae (D)
▌4. John H. Rogers (D)
▌5. Samuel W. Peel (D)

==== California ====
▌1. Thomas L. Thompson (D)
▌2. Marion Biggs (D)
▌3. Joseph McKenna (R)
▌4. William W. Morrow (R)
▌5. Charles N. Felton (R)
▌6. William Vandever (R)

==== Colorado ====
▌At-large. George G. Symes (R)

==== Connecticut ====
▌1. Robert J. Vance (D)
▌2. Carlos French (D)
▌3. Charles A. Russell (R)
▌4. Miles T. Granger (D)

==== Delaware ====
▌At-large. John B. Penington (D)

==== Florida ====
▌1. Robert H. M. Davidson (D)
▌2. Charles Dougherty (D)

==== Georgia ====
▌1. Thomas M. Norwood (D)
▌2. Henry G. Turner (D)
▌3. Charles F. Crisp (D)
▌4. Thomas W. Grimes (D)
▌5. John D. Stewart (D)
▌6. James H. Blount (D)
▌7. Judson C. Clements (D)
▌8. Henry H. Carlton (D)
▌9. Allen D. Candler (D)
▌10. George T. Barnes (D)

==== Illinois ====
▌1. Ransom W. Dunham (R)
▌2. Frank Lawler (D)
▌3. William E. Mason (R)
▌4. George E. Adams (R)
▌5. Albert J. Hopkins (R)
▌6. Robert R. Hitt (R)
▌7. Thomas J. Henderson (R)
▌8. Ralph Plumb (R)
▌9. Lewis E. Payson (R)
▌10. Philip S. Post (R)
▌11. William H. Gest (R)
▌12. George A. Anderson (D)
▌13. William M. Springer (D)
▌14. Jonathan H. Rowell (R)
▌15. Joseph G. Cannon (R)
▌16. Silas Z. Landes (D)
▌17. Edward Lane (D)
▌18. Jehu Baker (R)
▌19. Richard W. Townshend (D)
▌20. John R. Thomas (R)

==== Indiana ====
▌1. Alvin P. Hovey (R), until January 17, 1889

▌Francis B. Posey (R), from January 29, 1889

▌2. John H. O'Neall (D)
▌3. Jonas G. Howard (D)
▌4. William S. Holman (D)
▌5. Courtland C. Matson (D)
▌6. Thomas M. Browne (R)
▌7. William D. Bynum (D)
▌8. James T. Johnston (R)
▌9. Joseph B. Cheadle (R)
▌10. William D. Owen (R)
▌11. George W. Steele (R)
▌12. James B. White (R)
▌13. Benjamin F. Shively (D)

==== Iowa ====
▌1. John H. Gear (R)
▌2. Walter I. Hayes (D)
▌3. David B. Henderson (R)
▌4. William E. Fuller (R)
▌5. Daniel Kerr (R)
▌6. James B. Weaver (GB)
▌7. Edwin H. Conger (R)
▌8. Albert R. Anderson (IR)
▌9. Joseph Lyman (R)
▌10. Adoniram J. Holmes (R)
▌11. Isaac S. Struble (R)

==== Kansas ====
▌1. Edmund N. Morrill (R)
▌2. Edward H. Funston (R)
▌3. Bishop W. Perkins (R)
▌4. Thomas Ryan (R)
▌5. John A. Anderson (IR)
▌6. Erastus J. Turner (R)
▌7. Samuel R. Peters (R)

==== Kentucky ====
▌1. William J. Stone (D)
▌2. Polk Laffoon (D)
▌3. W. Godfrey Hunter (R)
▌4. Alexander B. Montgomery (D)
▌5. Asher G. Caruth (D)
▌6. John G. Carlisle (D)
▌7. William C. P. Breckinridge (D)
▌8. James B. McCreary (D)
▌9. George M. Thomas (R)
▌10. William P. Taulbee (D)
▌11. Hugh F. Finley (R)

==== Louisiana ====
▌1. Theodore S. Wilkinson (D)
▌2. Matthew D. Lagan (D)
▌3. Edward J. Gay (D)
▌4. Newton C. Blanchard (D)
▌5. Cherubusco Newton (D)
▌6. Edward W. Robertson (D), until August 2, 1887

▌Samuel M. Robertson (D), from December 5, 1887

==== Maine ====
▌1. Thomas B. Reed (R)
▌2. Nelson Dingley Jr. (R)
▌3. Seth L. Milliken (R)
▌4. Charles A. Boutelle (R)

==== Maryland ====
▌1. Charles H. Gibson (D)
▌2. Frank T. Shaw (D)
▌3. Henry W. Rusk (D)
▌4. Isidor Rayner (D)
▌5. Barnes Compton (D)
▌6. Louis E. McComas (R)

==== Massachusetts ====
▌1. Robert T. Davis (R)
▌2. John D. Long (R)
▌3. Leopold Morse (D)
▌4. Patrick A. Collins (D)
▌5. Edward D. Hayden (R)
▌6. Henry Cabot Lodge (R)
▌7. William Cogswell (R)
▌8. Charles H. Allen (R)
▌9. Edward Burnett (D)
▌10. John E. Russell (D)
▌11. William Whiting (R)
▌12. Francis W. Rockwell (R)

==== Michigan ====
▌1. J. Logan Chipman (D)
▌2. Edward P. Allen (R)
▌3. James O'Donnell (R)
▌4. Julius C. Burrows (R)
▌5. Melbourne H. Ford (D)
▌6. Mark S. Brewer (R)
▌7. Justin R. Whiting (D)
▌8. Timothy E. Tarsney (D)
▌9. Byron M. Cutcheon (R)
▌10. Spencer O. Fisher (D)
▌11. Seth C. Moffatt (R), until December 22, 1887

▌Henry W. Seymour (R), from February 14, 1888

==== Minnesota ====
▌1. Thomas Wilson (D)
▌2. John Lind (R)
▌3. John L. MacDonald (D)
▌4. Edmund Rice (D)
▌5. Knute Nelson (R)

==== Mississippi ====
▌1. John M. Allen (D)
▌2. James B. Morgan (D)
▌3. Thomas C. Catchings (D)
▌4. Frederick G. Barry (D)
▌5. Chapman L. Anderson (D)
▌6. Thomas R. Stockdale (D)
▌7. Charles E. Hooker (D)

==== Missouri ====
▌1. William H. Hatch (D)
▌2. Charles H. Mansur (D)
▌3. Alexander M. Dockery (D)
▌4. James N. Burnes (D), until January 23, 1889

▌Charles F. Booher (D), from February 19, 1889

▌5. William Warner (R)
▌6. John T. Heard (D)
▌7. John E. Hutton (D)
▌8. John J. O'Neill (D)
▌9. John M. Glover (D)
▌10. Martin L. Clardy (D)
▌11. Richard P. Bland (D)
▌12. William J. Stone (D)
▌13. William H. Wade (R)
▌14. James P. Walker (D)

==== Nebraska ====
▌1. John A. McShane (D)
▌2. James Laird (R)
▌3. George W. E. Dorsey (R)

==== Nevada ====
▌At-large. William Woodburn (R)

==== New Hampshire ====
▌1. Luther F. McKinney (D)
▌2. Jacob H. Gallinger (R)

==== New Jersey ====
▌1. George Hires (R)
▌2. James Buchanan (R)
▌3. John Kean Jr. (R)
▌4. James N. Pidcock (D)
▌5. William W. Phelps (R)
▌6. Herman Lehlbach (R)
▌7. William McAdoo (D)

==== New York ====
▌1. Perry Belmont (D), until December 1, 1888
▌2. Felix Campbell (D)
▌3. Stephen V. White (R)
▌4. Peter P. Mahoney (D)
▌5. Archibald M. Bliss (D)
▌6. Amos J. Cummings (D)
▌7. Lloyd S. Bryce (D)
▌8. Timothy J. Campbell (D)
▌9. Samuel S. Cox (D)
▌10. Francis B. Spinola (D)
▌11. Truman A. Merriman (D)
▌12. W. Bourke Cockran (D)
▌13. Ashbel P. Fitch (D)
▌14. William G. Stahlnecker (D)
▌15. Henry Bacon (D)
▌16. John H. Ketcham (R)
▌17. Stephen T. Hopkins (R)
▌18. Edward W. Greenman (D)
▌19. Nicholas T. Kane (D), until September 14, 1887

▌Charles Tracey (D), from November 8, 1887

▌20. George West (R)
▌21. John H. Moffitt (R)
▌22. Abraham X. Parker (R)
▌23. James S. Sherman (R)
▌24. David Wilber (R)
▌25. James J. Belden (R), from November 8, 1887
▌26. Milton De Lano (R)
▌27. Newton W. Nutting (R)
▌28. Thomas S. Flood (R)
▌29. Ira Davenport (R)
▌30. Charles S. Baker (R)
▌31. John G. Sawyer (R)
▌32. John M. Farquhar (R)
▌33. John B. Weber (R)
▌34. William G. Laidlaw (R)

==== North Carolina ====
▌1. Louis C. Latham (D)
▌2. Furnifold M. Simmons (D)
▌3. Charles W. McClammy (D)
▌4. John Nichols (I)
▌5. John M. Brower (R)
▌6. Alfred Rowland (D)
▌7. John S. Henderson (D)
▌8. William H. H. Cowles (D)
▌9. Thomas D. Johnston (D)

==== Ohio ====
▌1. Benjamin Butterworth (R)
▌2. Charles E. Brown (R)
▌3. Elihu S. Williams (R)
▌4. Samuel S. Yoder (D)
▌5. George E. Seney (D)
▌6. Melvin M. Boothman (R)
▌7. James E. Campbell (D)
▌8. Robert P. Kennedy (R)
▌9. William C. Cooper (R)
▌10. Jacob Romeis (R)
▌11. Albert C. Thompson (R)
▌12. Jacob J. Pugsley (R)
▌13. Joseph H. Outhwaite (D)
▌14. Charles P. Wickham (R)
▌15. Charles H. Grosvenor (R)
▌16. Beriah Wilkins (D)
▌17. Joseph D. Taylor (R)
▌18. William McKinley (R)
▌19. Ezra B. Taylor (R)
▌20. George W. Crouse (R)
▌21. Martin A. Foran (D)

==== Oregon ====
▌At-large. Binger Hermann (R)

==== Pennsylvania ====
▌1. Henry H. Bingham (R)
▌2. Charles O'Neill (R)
▌3. Samuel J. Randall (D)
▌4. William D. Kelley (R)
▌5. Alfred C. Harmer (R)
▌6. Smedley Darlington (R)
▌7. Robert M. Yardley (R)
▌8. Daniel Ermentrout (D)
▌9. John A. Hiestand (R)
▌10. William H. Sowden (D)
▌11. Charles R. Buckalew (D)
▌12. John Lynch (D)
▌13. Charles N. Brumm (R)
▌14. Franklin Bound (R)
▌15. Frank C. Bunnell (R)
▌16. Henry C. McCormick (R)
▌17. Edward Scull (R)
▌18. Louis E. Atkinson (R)
▌19. Levi Maish (D)
▌20. John Patton (R)
▌21. Welty McCullogh (R)
▌22. John Dalzell (R)
▌23. Thomas M. Bayne (R)
▌24. Oscar L. Jackson (R)
▌25. James T. Maffett (R)
▌26. Norman Hall (D)
▌27. William L. Scott (D)
▌At-large. Edwin S. Osborne (R)

==== Rhode Island ====
▌1. Henry J. Spooner (R)
▌2. Warren O. Arnold (R)

==== South Carolina ====
▌1. Samuel Dibble (D)
▌2. George D. Tillman (D)
▌3. James S. Cothran (D)
▌4. William H. Perry (D)
▌5. John J. Hemphill (D)
▌6. George W. Dargan (D)
▌7. William Elliott (D)

==== Tennessee ====
▌1. Roderick R. Butler (R)
▌2. Leonidas C. Houk (R)
▌3. John R. Neal (D)
▌4. Benton McMillin (D)
▌5. James D. Richardson (D)
▌6. Joseph E. Washington (D)
▌7. Washington C. Whitthorne (D)
▌8. Benjamin A. Enloe (D)
▌9. Presley T. Glass (D)
▌10. James Phelan Jr. (D)

==== Texas ====
▌1. Charles Stewart (D)
▌2. John H. Reagan (D), until March 4, 1887

▌William H. Martin (D), from November 4, 1887

▌3. Constantine B. Kilgore (D)
▌4. David B. Culberson (D)
▌5. Silas Hare (D)
▌6. Joseph Abbott (D)
▌7. William H. Crain (D)
▌8. Littleton W. Moore (D)
▌9. Roger Q. Mills (D)
▌10. Joseph D. Sayers (D)
▌11. Samuel W. T. Lanham (D)

==== Vermont ====
▌1. John W. Stewart (R)
▌2. William W. Grout (R)

==== Virginia ====
▌1. Thomas H. B. Browne (R)
▌2. George E. Bowden (R)
▌3. George D. Wise (D)
▌4. William E. Gaines (R)
▌5. John R. Brown (R)
▌6. Samuel I. Hopkins (L)
▌7. Charles T. O'Ferrall (D)
▌8. William H. F. Lee (D)
▌9. Henry Bowen (R)
▌10. Jacob Yost (R)

==== West Virginia ====
▌1. Nathan Goff (R)
▌2. William L. Wilson (D)
▌3. Charles P. Snyder (D)
▌4. Charles E. Hogg (D)

==== Wisconsin ====
▌1. Lucien B. Caswell (R)
▌2. Richard W. Guenther (R)
▌3. Robert M. La Follette Sr. (R)
▌4. Henry Smith (L)
▌5. Thomas R. Hudd (D)
▌6. Charles B. Clark (R)
▌7. Ormsby B. Thomas (R)
▌8. Nils P. Haugen (R)
▌9. Isaac Stephenson (R)

==== Non-voting members ====
▌Arizona Territory. Marcus A. Smith (D)
▌Dakota Territory. Oscar S. Gifford (R)
▌Idaho Territory. Fred T. Dubois (R)
▌Montana Territory. Joseph K. Toole (D)
▌New Mexico Territory. Antonio Joseph (D)
▌Utah Territory. John T. Caine (D)
▌Washington Territory. Charles S. Voorhees (D)
▌Wyoming Territory. Joseph M. Carey (R)

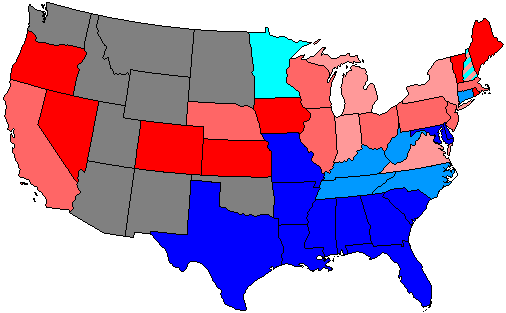
House seats by party holding plurality in state: 80%+ to 100% Democratic / 80%+ to 100% Republican; 60%+ to 80% Democratic / 60%+ to 80% Republican; Up to 60% Democratic / Up to 60% Republican

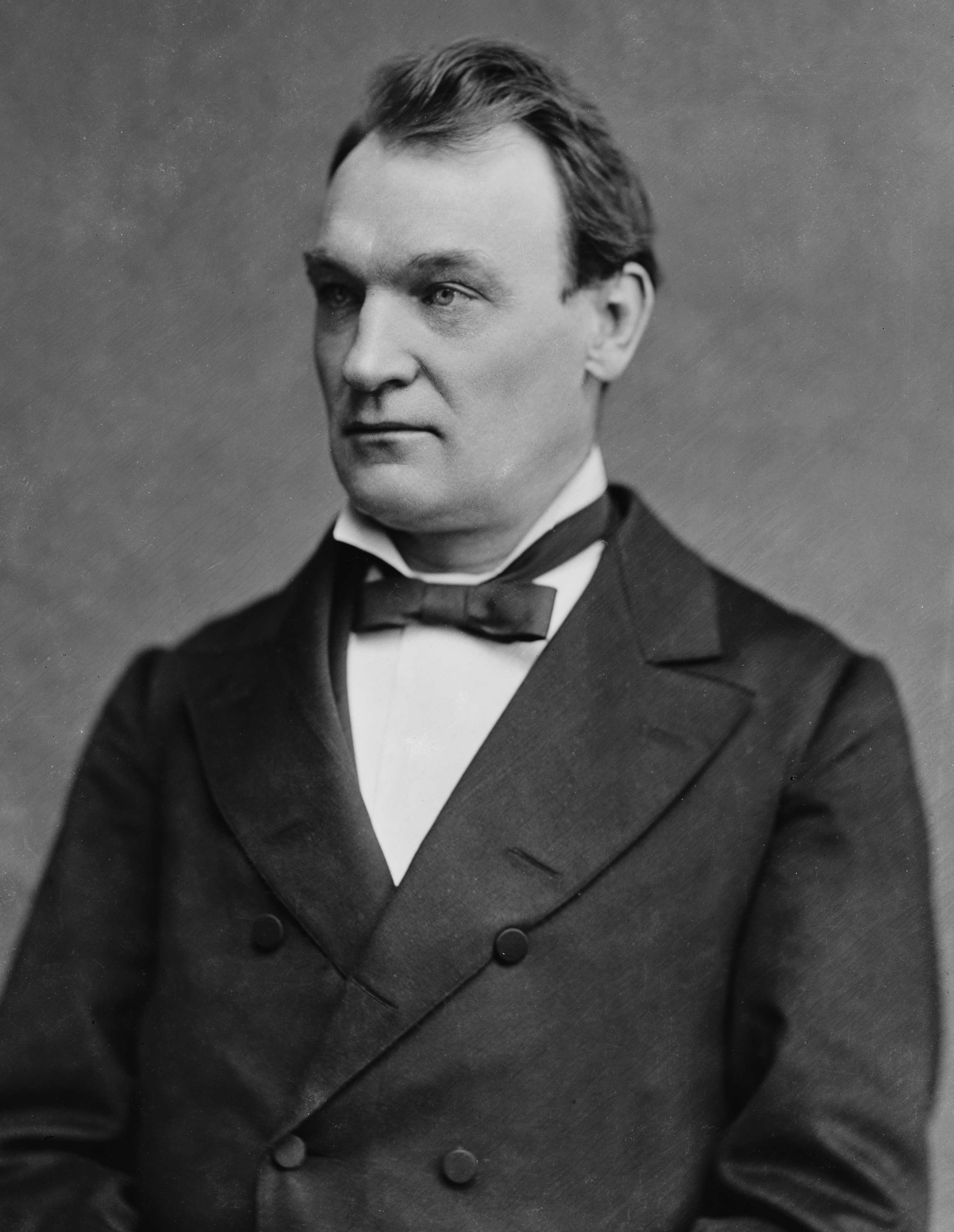
House Speaker John G. Carlisle

== Changes in membership ==
The count below reflects changes from the beginning of this Congress.

=== Senate ===
- Replacements: 1
  - Democratic: no net change
  - Republican: no net change
  - Liberal Republican: 1 seat net loss
- Deaths: 0
- Resignations: 1
- Interim appointments: 1
- Total seats with changes: 2

State (class)	Vacated by	Reason for vacancy	Subsequent	Date of successor's installation
West Virginia (1)	Vacant	Filled vacancy in term.	Charles J. Faulkner (D)	May 5, 1887
Florida (1)	Vacant	Filled vacancy in term.	Samuel Pasco (D)	May 19, 1887
New Hampshire (2)	Person C. Cheney (R)	Successor was elected June 14, 1887	William E. Chandler (R)	June 14, 1887

=== House of Representatives ===
- Replacements: 8
  - Democratic: no net change
  - Republican: no net change
- Deaths: 4
- Resignations: 5
- Contested election: 0
- Total seats with changes: 8

District	Vacated by	Reason for change	Successor	Date successor seated
New York 25th	Vacant	Rep. Frank Hiscock resigned during previous congress	James J. Belden (R)	November 8, 1887
Texas 2nd	John H. Reagan (D)	Resigned March 4, 1887, after being elected to the U.S. Senate	William H. Martin (D)	November 4, 1887
Louisiana 6th	Edward W. Robertson (D)	Died August 2, 1887	Samuel M. Robertson (D)	December 5, 1887
New York 19th	Nicholas T. Kane (D)	Died September 14, 1887	Charles Tracey (D)	November 8, 1887
Michigan 11th	Seth C. Moffatt (R)	Died December 22, 1887	Henry W. Seymour (R)	February 14, 1888
New York 1st	Perry Belmont (D)	Resigned December 1, 1888, after being appointed Minister to Spain	Vacant until next Congress	
Indiana 1st	Alvin P. Hovey (R)	Resigned January 17, 1889, after being elected Governor of Indiana. New member elected January 29, 1889, and seated February 6, 1889.	Francis B. Posey (R)	February 6, 1889
Missouri 4th	James N. Burnes (D)	Died January 23, 1889. New member elected February 19, 1889, and seated February 25, 1889.	Charles F. Booher (D)	February 25, 1889

== Committees ==
Lists of committees and their party leaders for members of the House and Senate committees can be found through the Official Congressional Directory at the bottom of this article. The directory after the pages of terms of service lists committees of the Senate, House (Standing with Subcommittees, Select and Special) and Joint and, after that, House/Senate committee assignments. On the committees section of the House and Senate in the Official Congressional Directory, the committee's members on the first row on the left side shows the chairman of the committee and on the right side shows the ranking member of the committee.

=== Senate ===
- Additional Accommodations for the Library of Congress (Select) (Chairman: Daniel W. Voorhees; Ranking Member: Justin S. Morrill)
- Agriculture and Forestry (Chairman: Thomas W. Palmer; Ranking Member: James Z. George)
- Appropriations (Chairman: William B. Allison; Ranking Member: James B. Beck)
- Audit and Control the Contingent Expenses of the Senate (Chairman: John P. Jones; Ranking Member: Zebulon B. Vance)
- Canadian Relations (Select) (Chairman: George F. Hoar; Ranking Member: N/A)
- Census (Chairman: Eugene Hale; Ranking Member: James H. Berry)
- Centennial of the Constitution and the Discovery of America (Select) (Chairman: Frank Hiscock; Ranking Member: Daniel W. Voorhees)
- Civil Service and Retrenchment (Chairman: Jonathan Chace; Ranking Member: Daniel W. Voorhees)
- Civil Service Operations (Special) (Chairman: William E. Chandler; Ranking Member: Joseph Clay Stiles Blackburn)
- Claims (Chairman: John C. Spooner; Ranking Member: James K. Jones)
- Coast Defenses (Chairman: Joseph N. Dolph; Ranking Member: John R. McPherson)
- Commerce (Chairman: William P. Frye; Ranking Member: Matt W. Ransom)
- Distributing Public Revenue Among the States (Select)
- District of Columbia (Chairman: John J. Ingalls; Ranking Member: Isham G. Harris)
- Education and Labor (Chairman: Henry W. Blair; Ranking Member: William B. Allison)
- Engrossed Bills (Chairman: Eli Saulsbury; Ranking Member: William B. Allison)
- Enrolled Bills (Chairman: Thomas M. Bowen; Ranking Member: Alfred H. Colquitt)
- Epidemic Diseases (Select) (Chairman: Isham G. Harris; Ranking Member: Eugene Hale)
- Examine the Several Branches in the Civil Service (Chairman: Matthew S. Quay; Ranking Member: Wade Hampton)
- Executive Departments Methods (Select) (Chairman: Matthew C. Butler; Ranking Member: Orville H. Platt)
- Expenditures of Public Money (Chairman: Charles B. Farwell; Ranking Member: William P. Frye)
- Finance (Chairman: Justin S. Morrill; Ranking Member: Daniel W. Voorhees)
- Fisheries (Chairman: John Sherman; Ranking Member: Wade Hampton)
- Foreign Relations (Chairman: Algernon S. Paddock; Ranking Member: John T. Morgan)
- Fishing Bounties and Allowances (Select)
- Five Civilized Tribes of Indians (Select) (Chairman: Matthew C. Butler; Ranking Member: J. Donald Cameron)
- Government Printing Office (Select)
- Indian Affairs (Chairman: Henry L. Dawes; Ranking Member: Isham G. Harris)
- Indian Traders (Select) (Chairman: William E. Chandler; Ranking Member: Joseph C. S. Blackburn)
- Interstate Commerce (Chairman: Shelby M. Cullom; Ranking Member: Isham G. Harris)
- Irrigation and Reclamation of Arid Lands (Select)
- Judiciary (Chairman: George F. Edmunds; Ranking Member: James L. Pugh)
- Library (Chairman: William M. Evarts; Ranking Member: Daniel W. Voorhees)
- Manufactures (Chairman: Harrison H. Riddleberger; Ranking Member: Alfred H. Colquitt)
- Military Affairs (Chairman: Joseph R. Hawley; Ranking Member: Francis M. Cockrell)
- Mines and Mining (Chairman: William M. Stewart; Ranking Member: William B. Bate)
- Mississippi River and its Tributaries (Select) (Chairman: Algernon S. Paddock; Ranking Member: James B. Eustis)
- Naval Affairs (Chairman: J. Donald Cameron; Ranking Member: John R. McPherson)
- Nicaraguan Claims (Select) (Chairman: John Tyler Morgan; Ranking Member: George F. Hoard)
- Pacific Railway Commission (Special) (Chairman: William P. Frye; Ranking Member: John T. Morgan)
- Patents (Chairman: Henry M. Teller; Ranking Member: James K. Jones)
- Pensions (Chairman: Cushman K. Davis; Ranking Member: Ephraim K. Wilson)
- Post Office and Post Roads (Chairman: Philetus Sawyer; Ranking Member: Eli Saulsbury)
- Potomac River Front (Select) (Chairman: John R. McPherson; Ranking Member: N/A)
- Printing (Chairman: Charles F. Manderson; Ranking Member: Arthur P. Gorman)
- Private Land Claims (Chairman: Matt W. Ransom; Ranking Member: George F. Edmonds)
- Privileges and Elections (Chairman: George F. Hoar; Ranking Member: Eli Saulsbury)
- Public Buildings and Grounds (Chairman: Leland Stanford; Ranking Member: George G. Vest)
- Public Lands (Chairman: Preston B. Plumb; Ranking Member: John T. Morgan)
- Railroads (Chairman: Dwight M. Sabin; Ranking Member: Francis B. Stockbridge)
- Revision of the Laws (Chairman: James F. Wilson; Ranking Member: Ephraim K. Wilson)
- Revolutionary Claims (Chairman: Richard Coke; Ranking Member: Jonathan Chace)
- Rules (Chairman: Nelson W. Aldrich; Ranking Member: Isham G. Harris)
- Tariff Regulation (Select)
- Territories (Chairman: Orville H. Platt; Ranking Member: Matthew C. Butler)
- Transportation and Sale of Meat Products (Select) (Chairman: George G. Vest; Ranking Member: N/A)
- Transportation Routes to the Seaboard (Chairman: John H. Mitchell; Ranking Member: Randall L. Gibson)
- Whole
- Woman Suffrage (Select) (Chairman: Francis M. Cockrell; Ranking Member: Thomas W. Palmer)

=== House of Representatives ===
- Accounts (Chairman: Frank T. Shaw; Ranking Member: James O'Donnell)
- Agriculture (Chairman: William H. Hatch; Ranking Member: Justin R. Whiting)
- Alcoholic Liquor Traffic (Select) (Chairman: James E. Campbell; Ranking Member: N/A)
- American Ship building (Select)
- Appropriations (Chairman: Samuel J. Randall; Ranking Member: Joseph G. Cannon)
- Banking and Currency (Chairman: Beriah Wilkins; Ranking Member: Luther F. McKinney)
- Claims (Chairman: S. W. T. Lanham; Ranking Member: John Lynch)
- Coinage, Weights and Measures (Chairman: Richard P. Bland; Ranking Member: Norman Hall)
- Commerce (Chairman: Martin L. Clardy; Ranking Member: James Phelan Jr.)
- District of Columbia (Chairman: John J. Hemphill; Ranking Member: Robert J. Vance)
- Education (Chairman: Allen D. Candler; Ranking Member: John B. Penington)
- Elections (Chairman: Charles F. Crisp; Ranking Member: Littleton W. Moore)
- Enrolled Bills (Chairman: Spencer O. Fisher; Ranking Member: Constantine B. Kilgore)
- Expenditures in the Interior Department (Chairman: Thomas R. Hudd; Ranking Member: Charles N. Brumm)
- Expenditures in the Justice Department (Chairman: William H. H. Cowles; Ranking Member: Albert C. Thompson)
- Expenditures in the Navy Department (Chairman: William L. Scott; Ranking Member: Jacob Romeis)
- Expenditures in the Post Office Department (Chairman: Alexander M. Dockery; Ranking Member: Charles E. Brown)
- Expenditures in the State Department (Chairman: Leopold Morse; Ranking Member: Louis E. Atkinson)
- Expenditures in the Treasury Department (Chairman: Joseph Wheeler; Ranking Member: John M. Farquhar)
- Expenditures in the War Department (Chairman: Polk Laffoon; Ranking Member: William Warner)
- Expenditures on Public Buildings (Chairman: Timothy J. Campbell; Ranking Member: Seth L. Milliken)
- Foreign Affairs (Chairman: James B. McCreary; Ranking Member: James S. Cothran)
- Indian Affairs (Chairman: Samuel W. Peel; Ranking Member: Silas Hare)
- Invalid Pensions (Chairman: Courtland C. Matson; Ranking Member: Thomas L. Thompson)
- Judiciary (Chairman: David B. Culberson; Ranking Member: John D. Stewart)
- Labor (Chairman: John J. O'Neill; Ranking Member: Edward Burnett)
- Levees and Improvements of the Mississippi River (Chairman: Thomas C. Catchings; Ranking Member: Samuel M. Robertson)
- Library (Chairman: William G. Stahlnecker; Ranking Member: Charles O'Neill)
- Manufactures (Chairman: Henry Bacon; Ranking Member: Frank C. Bunnell)
- Merchant Marine and Fisheries (Chairman: Poindexter Dunn; Ranking Member: John L. MacDonald)
- Mileage (Chairman: John H. Rogers; Ranking Member: James J. Belden)
- Military Affairs (Chairman: Richard W. Townshend; Ranking Member: Samuel S. Yoder)
- Militia (Chairman: William McAdoo; Ranking Member: Francis B. Spinola)
- Mines and Mining (Chairman: Charles T. O'Ferrall; Ranking Member: Marion Biggs)
- Naval Affairs (Chairman: Hilary A. Herbert; Ranking Member: Joseph Abbott)
- Pacific Railroads (Chairman: Joseph H. Outhwaite; Ranking Member: Miles T. Granger)
- Patents (Chairman: James B. Weaver; Ranking Member: Robert J. Vance)
- Pensions (Chairman: Archibald M. Bliss; Ranking Member: John E. Russell)
- Printing (Chairman: James D. Richardson; Ranking Member: John A. Hiestand)
- Private Land Claims (Chairman: John M. Glover; Ranking Member: Louis C. Latham)
- Post Office and Post Roads (Chairman: James H. Blount; Ranking Member: Alfred Rowland)
- Public Buildings and Grounds (Chairman: Samuel Dibble; Ranking Member: Charles E. Hogg)
- Public Lands (Chairman: William S. Holman; Ranking Member: John L. MacDonald)
- Railways and Canals (Chairman: Robert H. M. Davidson; Ranking Member: Henry H. Carlton)
- Revision of Laws (Chairman: William C. Oates; Ranking Member: Charles E. Hogg)
- Rivers and Harbors (Chairman: Newton C. Blanchard; Ranking Member: Thomas L. Thompson)
- Rules (Chairman: John G. Carlisle; Ranking Member: Thomas B. Reed)
- Standards of Official Conduct
- Territories (Chairman: William M. Springer; Ranking Member: Melbourne H. Ford)
- War Claims (Chairman: William J. Stone; Ranking Member: Theodore S. Wilkinson)
- Ways and Means (Chairman: Roger Q. Mills; Ranking Member: William D. Kelley)
- Whole

=== Joint committees ===
- Conditions of Indian Tribes (Special)
- Disposition of (Useless) Executive Papers
- To Investigate Work on the Washington Aqueduct Tunnel
- The Library (Chairman: William G. Stahlnecker; Vice Chairman: Charles O'Neill)
- Printing

== Caucuses ==
- Democratic (House)
- Democratic (Senate)

== Administrative officers ==
=== Legislative branch agency directors ===
- Architect of the Capitol: Edward Clark
- Librarian of Congress: Ainsworth Rand Spofford
- Public Printer of the United States: Thomas E. Benedict

=== Senate ===
- Chaplain: John G. Butler (Lutheran)
- Secretary: Anson G. McCook
- Librarian: Alonzo M. Church
- Sergeant at Arms: William P. Canady

=== House of Representatives ===
- Chaplain: William H. Milburn (Methodist)
- Clerk: John B. Clark Jr.
- Doorkeeper: Alvin B. Hurt, elected December 5, 1887
- Clerk at the Speaker's Table: Nathaniel T. Crutchfield
- Postmaster: Lycurgus Dalton
- Reading Clerks: Thomas S. Pettit (D) and Neill S. Brown Jr. (R)
- Sergeant at Arms: John P. Leedom

== See also ==
- 1886 United States elections (elections leading to this Congress)
  - 1886–87 United States Senate elections
  - 1886 United States House of Representatives elections
- 1888 United States elections (elections during this Congress, leading to the next Congress)
  - 1888 United States presidential election
  - 1888–89 United States Senate elections
  - 1888 United States House of Representatives elections
