= Jack Joyce =

Jack Joyce may refer to:

- Jack Joyce (horse trainer) (1876–1934), American cowboy
- Jack Joyce (unionist) (1935–2013), American labor union leader
- Jack Joyce (businessman) (1942–2014), American business executive and lawyer
