= John Swinburne (New York politician) =

American politician

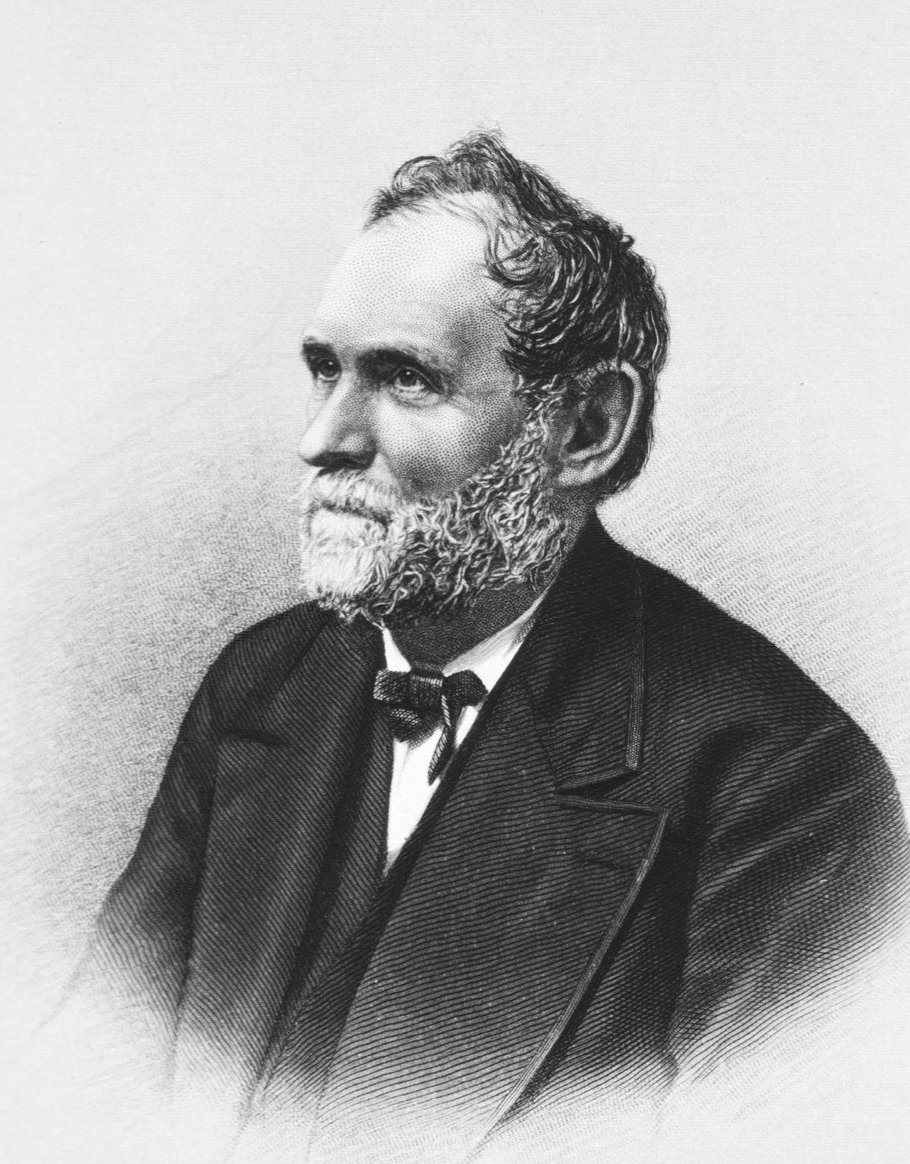

Mayor of Albany, New York
- In office 1883–1884
- Preceded by: Michael Nicholas Nolan
- Succeeded by: Anthony Bleecker Banks

Member of the U.S. House of Representatives from New York's 19th district
- In office March 4, 1885 – March 3, 1887
- Preceded by: Abraham X. Parker
- Succeeded by: Nicholas Thomas Kane

Personal details
- Born: May 30, 1820 Lewis County, New York, U.S.
- Died: March 28, 1889 (aged 68) Albany, New York, U.S.
- Resting place: Albany Rural Cemetery
- Party: Republican

John Swinburne (May 30, 1820 – March 28, 1889) was an American medical doctor and Republican congressman from New York who served as a medical officer from 1861 to 1864, during the Civil War and as a member of American Ambulance Corps at the Siege of Paris in 1870–71. In his last decade, 1880s, he was briefly mayor of Albany and represented New York's 19th congressional district for one term.

== Education and service in Civil War and Franco-Prussian War ==
Born into a farming family in the unincorporated community of Deer River in Lewis County, Swinburne lost his father at the age of twelve and had to work to support himself as well as assume responsibility for his mother and sisters. He sought summertime work on farms and, during wintertime, attended the county's public schools and academies in nearby towns of Denmark and Lowville, as well as Fairfield in neighboring Herkimer County. Graduating from Albany Medical College, first in his 1846 class, he began a practice as physician and surgeon.

In 1861, at the start of the Civil War, he was appointed by commander of New York National Guard, Brigadier General John F. Rathbone, to serve as chief medical officer at Albany depot. In June 1862, following Battle of Savage's Station, as Army of the Potomac, along with its physicians, retreated, Swinburne remained to care for the thousands of wounded prisoners, both Union and Confederate. Respecting his principled stand, Confederate commander Stonewall Jackson gave him a pass, with an accompanying personal note, permitting visits to Union prisoners. In 1864, Governor Horatio Seymour nominated him to the post of Health Officer of the Port of New York and, in 1867, he was renominated by Governor Reuben Fenton, serving a total of six years, until 1870. During his administration, despite the state legislature's reluctance to assign funding, he supervised the construction of then-state-of-the-art quarantine facilities on islands which were named Swinburne and Hoffman.

While on a trip to Europe in July 1870, following retirement from the port, he arrived in France at the outbreak of the Franco-Prussian War. In September, as the Siege of Paris began, he was importuned by the city's American community to form, at their expense, the Parisian equivalent of the Civil War U.S. Ambulance Corps. For the next six months, through the fall of Paris to the Prussian Army on January 28, 1871, until his departure on March 18, the first day of the revolutionary Paris Commune, the ambulance corps operated on a wide-ranging scale throughout the city, obtaining results beyond the over-stretched capacities of the local physicians. In recognition of his efforts, the newly formed Third Republic awarded him the decoration of Chevalier [Knight] in Legion of Honor, the country's highest distinction. He was also decorated by the Red Cross of Geneva.

== As physician, mayor and congressman ==
Returning from Europe, Swinburne settled in Albany and established a medical practice, including the free Swiburne Dispensary in which tens of thousands of indigent patients were treated at his expense. He also accepted, in 1876, the chair of Professor of Fractures and Clinical Surgery with Albany Medical College and became a pioneering expert in providing forensic testimony at trials involving medical evidence. Due to his unorthodox innovative methods in the treatment of bone disease, his colleagues at the College, in a secret, nighttime meeting, abolished his chair, thus when he arrived the following morning to deliver a scheduled lecture, the doors of the auditorium were locked. His charitable work was also resented by a number of local doctors who made repeated legal attempts to shut down the free clinic. Students at the College, however, rallied around him and demanded the publication of his lectures.

In the charter election of April 1882, as the Republican candidate for Mayor of Albany, he received what appeared to be a majority, but a recount gave his Democratic opponent, Michael N. Nolan, who was both the incumbent mayor and a member of Congress, a 118-vote win. The resulting litigation, which lasted for fourteen months of the two-year term, ultimately forced Nolan's resignation on June 24, 1883, and the swearing-in of John Swinburne as mayor. Mayor Swinburne held the office just over ten months, until the expiration of his term on May 6, 1884. In April, he was denied re-election by a similar discrepancy of 241 votes, which handed the mayoralty to the Democratic candidate, A. Bleecker Banks. Republicans then offered him the 19th district's congressional seat and, in November, he prevailed over Democrat Thomas J. Van Alstyne, the incumbent from 16th congressional district who had been redistricted into the 19th.

Following the election, an ultimately unsuccessful movement started to nominate him for Governor of New York in the gubernatorial contest of November 1885. In the interim, he served in the Forty-ninth Congress from March 4, 1885, to March 3, 1887, but, in November 1886, was again controversially defeated by Democrat Nicholas T. Kane with a challenged margin of 81 votes. Upon Kane's death in September, six months after taking office, Swinburne was urged to run in the special election to replace him, but declined any further participation in politics.

In the two years remaining, John Swinburne returned to his medical practice and the treatment of the indigent. Suffering from stomach cancer, he died at home in Albany at age 68 and was interred in Albany Rural Cemetery.

== See also ==
- List of mayors of Albany, New York

Political offices
Preceded by Michael Nicholas Nolan	Mayor of Albany, New York; 1883–1884	Succeeded by Anthony Bleecker Banks
U.S. House of Representatives
Preceded by Abraham X. Parker	Member of the U.S. House of Representatives from New York's 19th congressional district 1885–1887	Succeeded by Nicholas Thomas Kane
