= James H. Blessing =

Mayor of Albany, New York

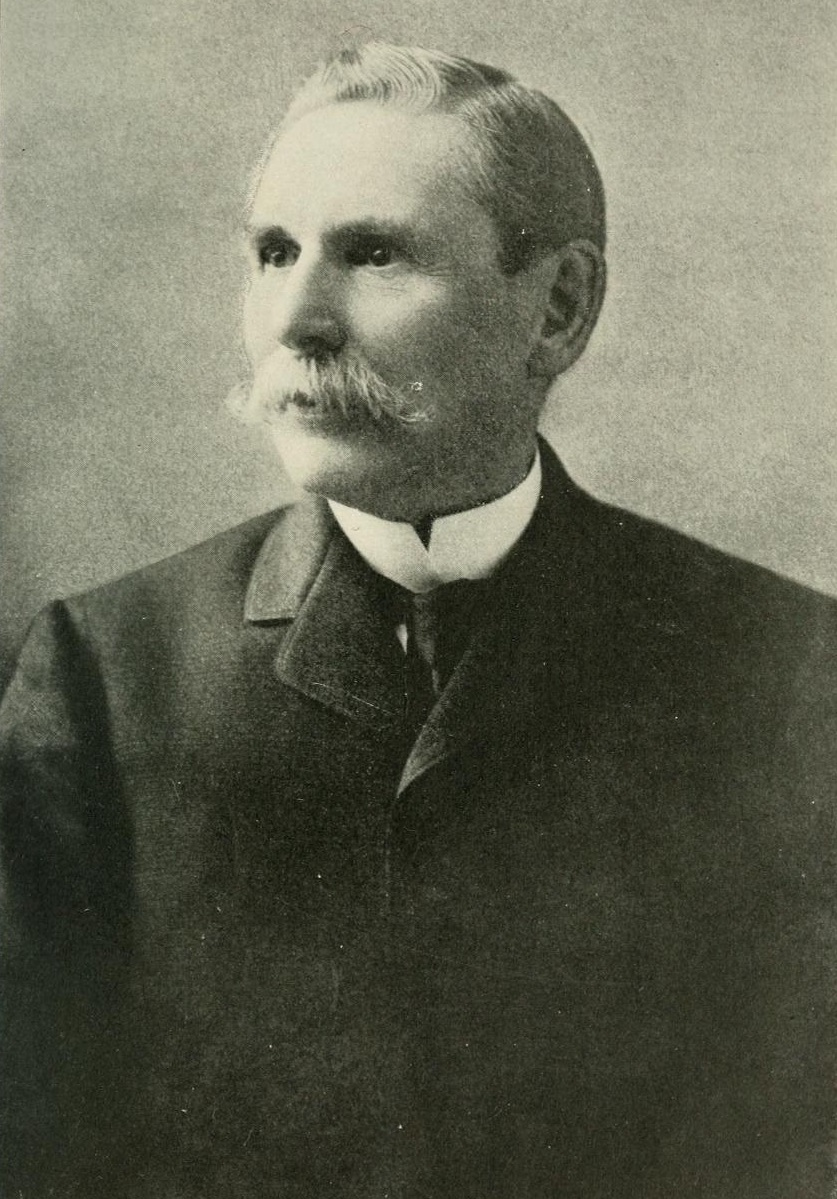
- From 1906's Albany Chronicles

Mayor of Albany, New York
- In office January 1, 1900 – December 31, 1901
- Preceded by: Thomas J. Van Alstyne
- Succeeded by: Charles H. Gaus

President of the Albany County, New York Board of Supervisors
- In office 1895–1896
- Preceded by: Darius Rundell
- Succeeded by: Edward McCreary

Member of the Albany County, New York Board of Supervisors
- In office 1894–1896
- Preceded by: Martin J. Lawlor
- Succeeded by: Moses Ettenger
- Constituency: Albany's 5th Ward

Personal details
- Born: April 17, 1837 French Mills, New York, U.S.
- Died: February 21, 1910 (aged 72) Albany, New York, U.S.
- Resting place: Albany Rural Cemetery, Menands, New York, U.S.
- Party: Republican
- Spouse(s): Martha Hutson; Mary Gilson
- Children: 2
- Occupation: Inventor engineer corporate executive

Military service
- Allegiance: United States (Union)
- Service: Union Navy
- Years of service: 1864–1865
- Rank: Third Assistant Engineer
- Unit: Bureau of Yards and Docks; North Atlantic Blockading Squadron
- Wars: American Civil War: First Battle of Fort Fisher; Second Battle of Fort Fisher

James H. Blessing (April 17, 1837 – February 21, 1910) was an American inventor, engineer, and business executive from Albany, New York. A Republican, he served as a member of the Albany County Board of Supervisors from 1894 to 1896, and president of the board from 1895 to 1896. From 1900 to 1901, he served as Albany's mayor.

A native of Guilderland, New York, Blessing was raised and educated in Albany, and worked as a grocery store clerk before becoming an apprentice machinist. After completing his apprenticeship, Blessing worked at an Albany machine shop until the start of the American Civil War. After working as a ship design and construction engineer at the Brooklyn Navy Yard, he joined the Union Navy in 1864, and he served until the end of the war.

After the war, Blessing worked as the superintendent of an Albany foundry and machine works, and in 1870 he invented a steam trap that vastly improved the efficiency of the steam engines then largely in use in factories and other businesses. As the partner in an Albany company that built and sold his invention, Blessing became wealthy. He also continued to invent, and his efforts resulted in several more implements and tools that were used on steam engines.

A Republican in politics, Blessing served on the Albany County Board of Supervisors from 1894 to 1896 and was the board's president from 1895 to 1896. In 1899, he was the successful Republican nominee for mayor. he served one term, 1900 to 1901, and was not a candidate for reelection. After leaving office, he returned to his business interests. Blessing died in Albany on February 21, 1910, and was buried at Albany Rural Cemetery.

== Early life ==
James Henry Blessing was born in French Mills, part of the town of Guilderland, New York, on April 17, 1837, the son of Frederick I. Blessing and Lucinda (Smith) Blessing. His family moved to Albany when he was five years old, and he attended Albany's public schools. Blessing began working as a grocery store clerk when he was twelve, and he continued in this position until he was sixteen. In 1853, he began work as an apprentice machinist at the furnace and machine shop of F & T Townsend, in which Frederick Townsend was a principal. He completed his apprenticeship in 1857, after which he continued to work as a machinist for the Townsend company.

At the start of the American Civil War, Blessing and Frederick Townsend invented a breech-loading rifle intended for use by the Union Army. Townsend joined the army and Blessing began working for the navy, so they did not continue to pursue procurement and fielding of their new firearm. In 1862, Blessing began working at the Brooklyn Navy Yard as an engineer for the Union Navy, where he took part in the design and construction of warships. In 1864, he joined the navy with the rank of third assistant engineer, and was assigned to the North Atlantic Blockading Squadron. While performing duties aboard USS New Berne, he took part in December 1864's First Battle of Fort Fisher and January 1865's Second Battle of Fort Fisher. Blessing was granted sick leave after the battles, and was discharged at the end of the war. From 1865 to 1866, he was chief engineer in charge of steam-powered machinery for the Brooklyn City Railroad Company.

== Career ==
In 1866, Blessing returned to Albany to become superintendent of the foundry and machine works at Townsend & Jackson, where he was again associated with Frederick Townsend. In 1870, Blessing invented the return steam trap, a device which improved the efficiency of steam engines by returning condensation to the boiler so it could be re-used, and became widely used throughout the world. In 1872, he left Townsend & Jackson to become a partner with Townsend in the firm of Townsend & Blessing, which manufactured Blessing's steam trap. In 1875, Blessing, Townsend, and other investors formed the Albany Steam Trap Company, which expanded the manufacture and sale of Blessing's invention. While a partner in this company, Blessing continued to invent, and the devices he patented included traps, boilers, valves, and packing for steam engines, as well as pump governors, water filters, boiler purifiers, and steam and oil separators.

Blessing was active in politics as a Republican, including service as vice president of his ward's party committee and selection as a delegate to numerous local party conventions. In 1894, he was elected to represent Albany's fifth ward on the Albany County Board of Supervisors. He served until 1896, and was the board's president from 1895 to 1896.

In 1899, Blessing was elected mayor of Albany, the first chosen after enactment of a new city charter. He served one two-year term, 1900 to 1901. During Blessing's administration, he emphasized public education, including the completion of School 12. In addition, the city constructed and began operation of its first public baths. When the United States Navy planned construction of the cruiser USS Albany, he organized ceremonies to commemorate the launch of the new ship. Blessing's victory helped usher in more than 20 years of control by the Republican organization headed by William Barnes Jr. (Note: In 1894, Republican Oren Elbridge Wilson won the election for mayor, but he was elected by a coalition of Democrats and anti-Barnes Republicans.) He did not run for reelection in 1900.

== Later life ==
Blessing's civic and professional memberships included the American Society of Mechanical Engineers, Capital City Republican Club, and Albany Institute of History & Art. He was also a devout Baptist, and attended Albany's First Baptist Church.

In 1857, Blessing married Martha Hutson, who died in 1866. They were the parents of two daughters, one of whom died in infancy. In 1870, he married Mary (Gilson) Judd, who died in 1916.

Blessing died in Albany on February 21, 1910. His funeral took place at the First Baptist Church in Albany. Blessing was buried at Albany Rural Cemetery.
