= Charles Tracey =

American politician from New York State (1847–1905)

Charles Tracey KCSG
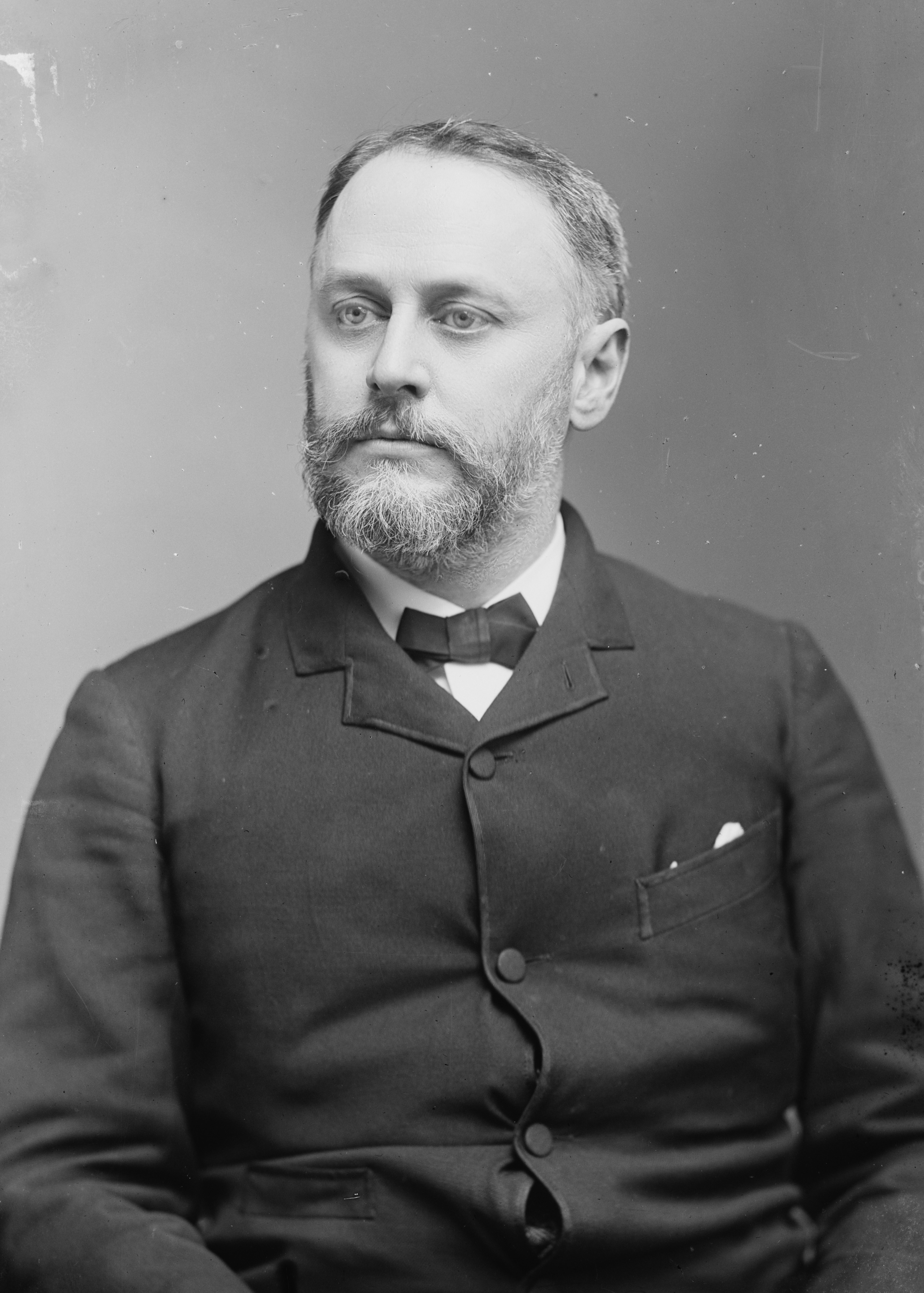
- Portrait by C. M. Bell c. 1887–1890

Member of the U.S. House of Representatives from New York
- In office November 8, 1887 – March 3, 1895
- Preceded by: Nicholas T. Kane
- Succeeded by: George N. Southwick
- Constituency: 19th district (1887–93); 20th district (1893–95)

Personal details
- Born: May 27, 1847 Albany, New York, U.S.
- Died: March 24, 1905 (aged 57) Albany, New York, U.S.
- Party: Democratic

Military service
- Allegiance: Papal States
- Years of service: 1867–1870
- Unit: Papal Zouaves
- Battles/wars: Capture of Rome

Charles Tracey (May 27, 1847 – March 24, 1905) was a U.S. Representative from New York.

== Early life ==
Born in Albany, New York, Tracey graduated from The Albany Academy in 1866. He served in the Papal Zouaves at Rome, Italy between 1867 and 1870 and was taken prisoner during the capture of Rome by the Italian Army. Returning to the United States after his release, Tracey engaged in the distilling business, joining his father's firm John Tracey & Co. in Albany. For his service to the Papal States, he was made a chevalier of the order of St. Gregory the Great by Pope Pius IX in 1871.

== Political career ==
Tracey was appointed aide-de-camp to Governor Samuel J. Tilden of New York with the rank of colonel on January 1, 1875. He was appointed commissary-general of subsistence to Governor Lucius Robinson with the rank of brigadier general on January 1, 1877. This appointment earned him the lifelong title "General". Tracey was later appointed to the Board of Managers of the House of Refuge in Hudson, New York, by Governor Grover Cleveland and reappointed by David B. Hill in 1886.

=== U.S. Congress ===
Tracey was elected as a Democrat to the Fiftieth Congress to fill the vacancy caused by the death of Nicholas T. Kane. He was reelected to the Fifty-first, Fifty-second, and Fifty-third Congresses and served from November 8, 1887, to March 3, 1895. After redistricting based on the results of the 1890 United States census, his home seat shifted from the 19th to the 20th congressional district prior to the 1892 elections for the Fifty-third Congress. In 1894, Tracey was an unsuccessful candidate for reelection to the Fifty-fourth Congress.

The major accomplishment of his first term was funding the expansion of Watervliet Arsenal to produce large-bore cannon for the United States Army Coast Artillery Corps in September 1888. This project had been under discussion in previous congresses, having been originally recommended by the War Department in 1884. During subsequent terms, Tracey introduced and shepherded passage of measures to strengthen enforcement of the eight-hour workday at federal government offices and jobsites and to implement a project to deepen the Hudson River, permitting sea-going vessels to travel as far north as Albany and Troy, New York.

In 1894, Tracey was one of six congressmen to vote in favor of a single tax amendment to the Wilson–Gorman Tariff Act. Proposed by Georgist and fellow Democrat James G. Maguire of California, it was intended as a substitute for the bill's proposed income tax. It would have levied a direct tax of $31,311,125 on land values nationwide. After this was rejected, Tracey voted in favor of the original version of the bill, but did not vote on the final version sent back by the Senate several months later.

== Later life and death ==
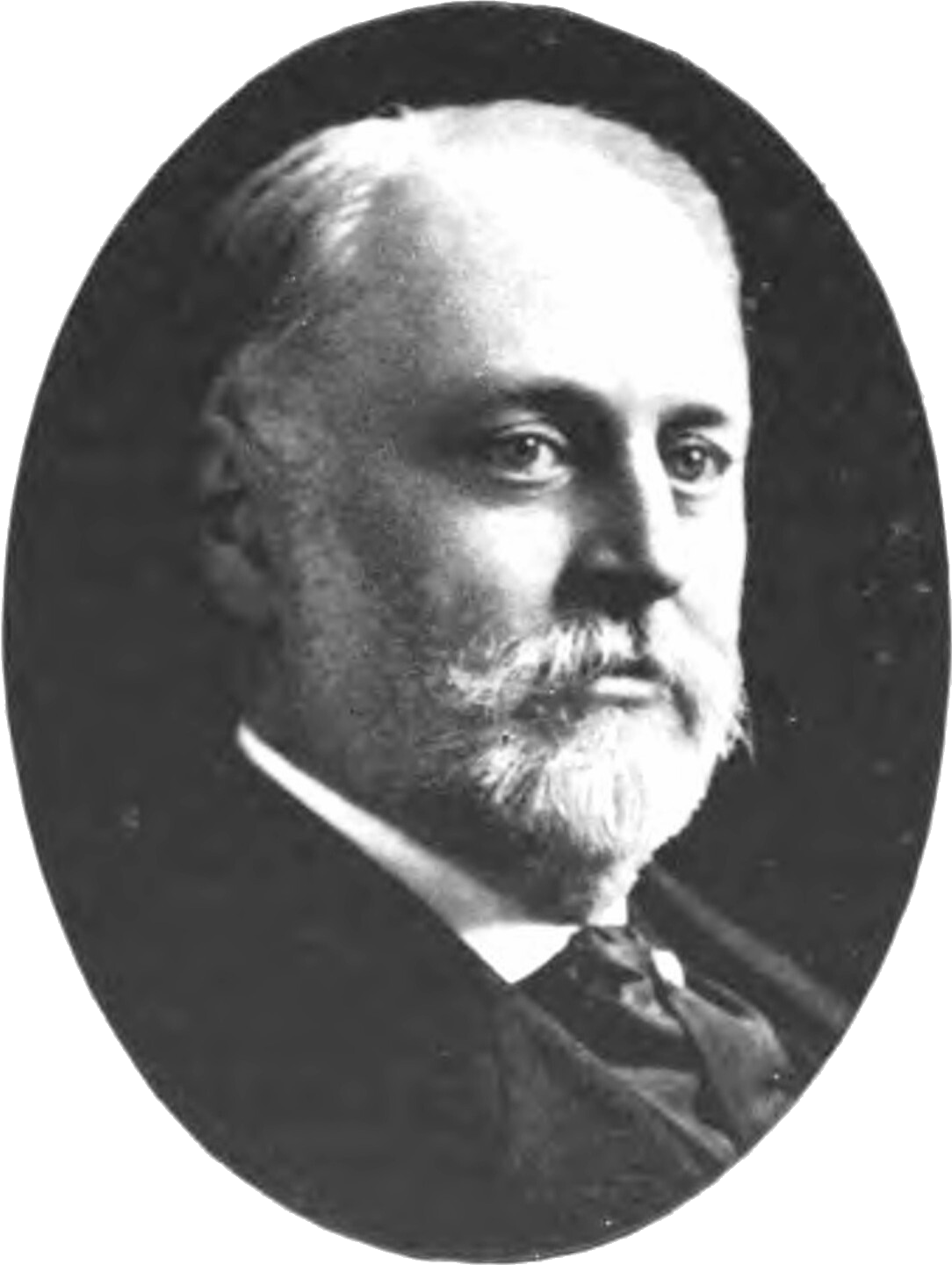
Tracey later in life

Returning to Albany in 1895, Tracey was reappointed to the Board of Managers of the House of Refuge by Governor Levi P. Morton. He also resumed his business activities in Albany and Rochester, New York.

Suffering from a liver ailment, Tracey went to Watkins Glen, New York in late December 1904 for treatment. Returning to his home in Albany, he died there at the age of 57 on March 24, 1905. Tracey was interred in St. Agnes Cemetery, Menands, New York.

== Personal ==
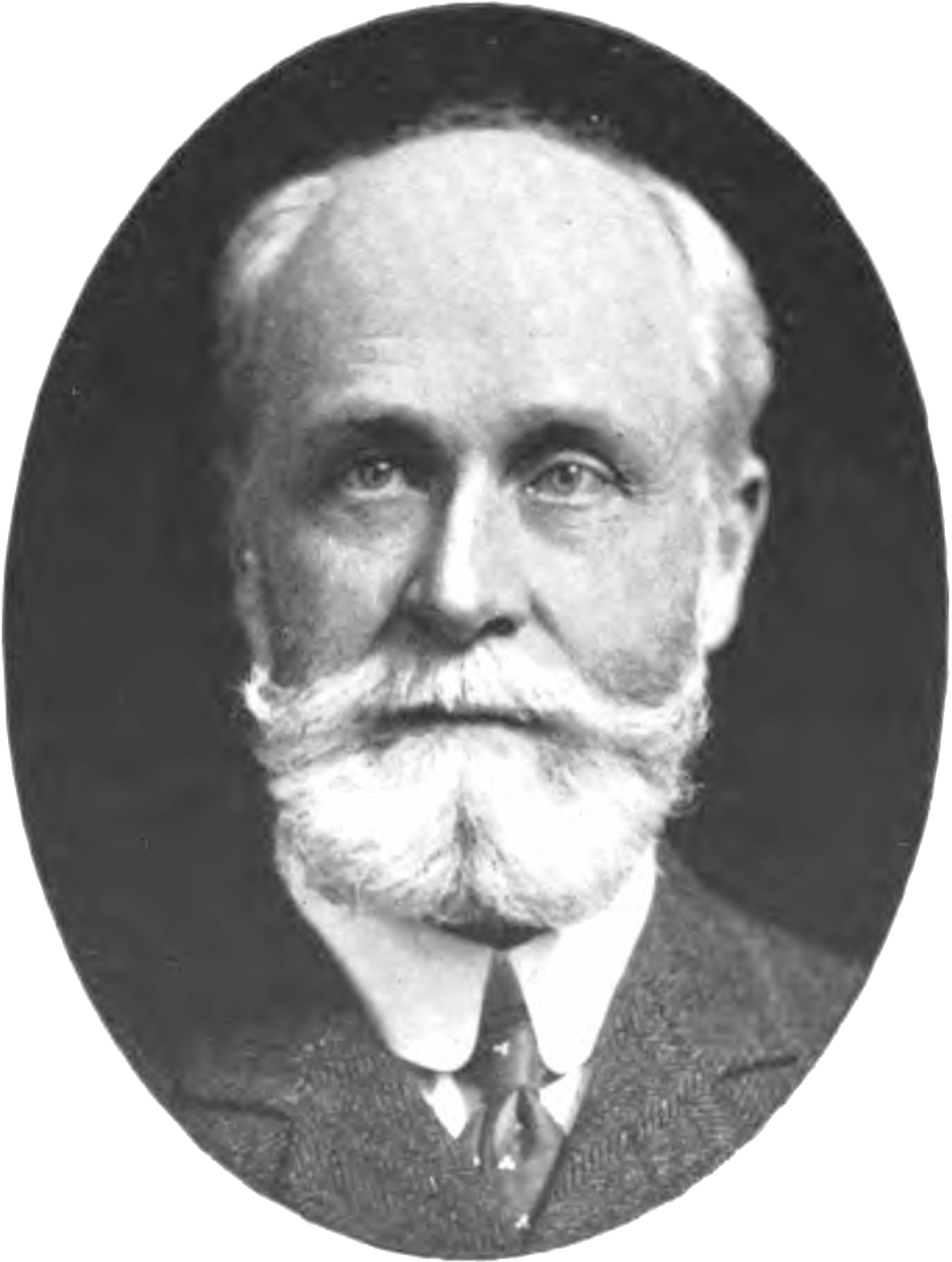
Tracey's brother James

Tracey was the son of John Tracey (died July 12, 1875) and his wife Maria McCarthy Tracey (died February 5, 1880). His father was born in Ireland and emigrated to Canada at the age of fourteen accompanied by his older brother Daniel Tracey and older sister Ann Tracey, who later married Charles Wilson. He moved to Albany after the Patriot war of 1837. His mother was born on the Isle of Wight, the daughter of an officer in the British Army.

His older brother John Tracey Jr. (November 30, 1842 – May 17, 1897) was an 1859 graduate of Mount St. Mary's School in Maryland and an 1862 graduate of Albany Law School. He was commissioned as a lieutenant in the Union Army and advanced to lieutenant colonel in the 18th New York Volunteer Cavalry by the end of the Civil War. After the war, John Tracey Jr. was brevetted colonel by New York Governor Reuben Fenton for his service under Col. James J. Byrne and Col. Oliver P. Gooding (his brigade commander) during the Red River campaign. He was later appointed superintendent of charities for the District of Columbia by President Grover Cleveland in 1893.

His younger brother James Francis Tracey (May 30, 1854 – September 19, 1925) studied at the Albany Academy before earning his A.B. degree from Georgetown College, Washington, D.C. in 1874 and his LL.B. degree from Albany Law School in 1875. He then worked as a lawyer in Albany and taught at Albany Law School. After being appointed by President Theodore Roosevelt, James Tracey served as an associate justice of the Supreme Court of the Philippines from 1905 to 1909. He was conferred an honorary LL.D. degree by Georgetown University in 1910.

On June 14, 1883, Charles Tracey married Marie-Anne Marguerite-Hermine Juchereau "Hermine" Duchesnay in Montreal, Quebec, Canada. They had a daughter and four sons.

== Sources ==
- United States Congress. "Charles Tracey (id: T000341)". Biographical Directory of the United States Congress.

U.S. House of Representatives
Preceded by Nicholas T. Kane	Member of the U.S. House of Representatives from New York's 19th congressional district 1887–1893	Succeeded by Charles D. Haines
Preceded by John Sanford	Member of the U.S. House of Representatives from New York's 20th congressional district 1893–1895	Succeeded by George N. Southwick
