= Steam trap =

Automatic value for steam equipment

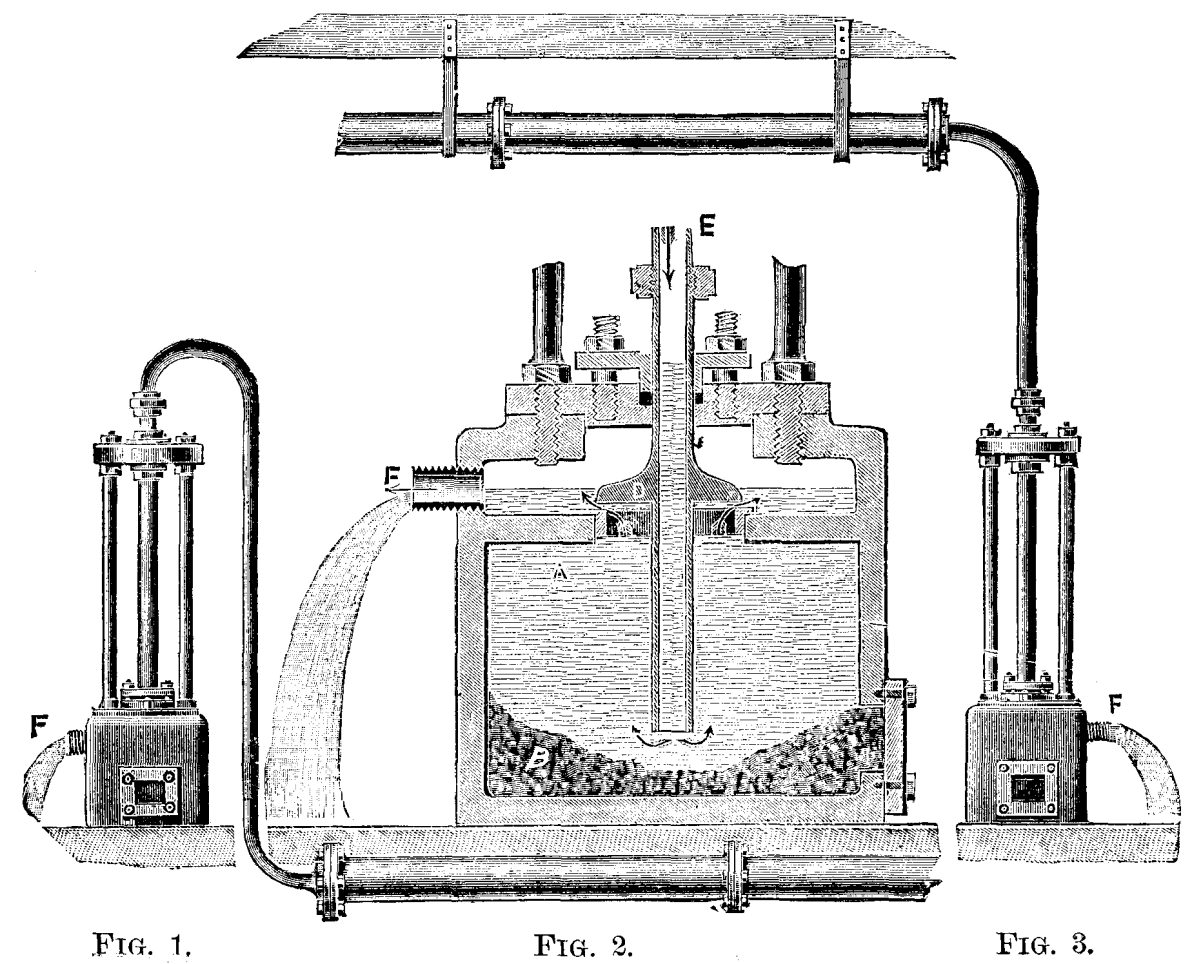
Three views of a c.1885 steam trap. The general appearance of this arrangement is as in Fig. 1 or Fig. 3. The center view, Fig. 2, shows the cardinal feature of this trap, that it contains a collector for silt, sand, or sediment which is not, as in most other traps of the time, carried out through the valve with the efflux of water.

A steam trap is a device used to remove steam condensate and non-condensable gases from steam. Steam traps are valves that automatically open and close to "trap" the steam upstream of the device, while allowing condensate to flow through. The three important functions of steam traps are:

- Discharge condensate as soon as it is formed (unless it is desirable to use the sensible heat of the liquid condensate)
- Have a negligible steam consumption (i.e. be energy efficient)
- Have the capability of discharging air and other non-condensable gases.

Steam traps are frequently used in industrial steam systems. When steam loses energy through friction or heat transfer, it condenses into liquid water. This water, called condensate, is harmful to steam systems because it causes energy loss, steam hammers, and corrosion.

== Basic operation ==
The design of a steam trap utilizes the difference in properties between steam and condensate. Since liquid condensate has a much higher density than gaseous steam, it will tend to accumulate at the lowest point in the system. Steam properties such as density, latent heat, and boiling point are affected by pressure.

Steam traps can be split into three main categories: mechanical, thermodynamic, and thermostatic. Each type uses a different operating principle to remove condensate and non-condensable gases.

Steam traps are sized for specific applications based on the amounts of condensate they can remove as well as other factors such as the ability to remove air and non-condensable gases.

== Types ==
Steam traps can be split into three major types:

=== Mechanical traps ===
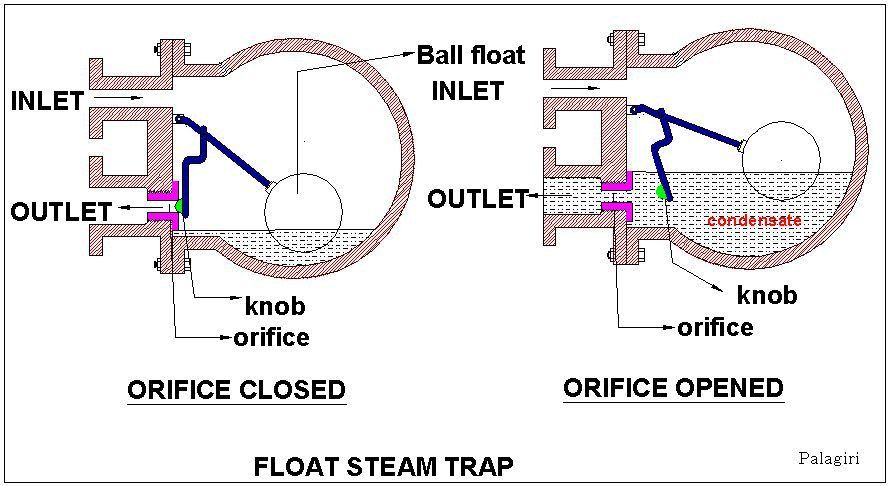
Float-style mechanical steam trap

Mechanical traps utilize the difference in density between steam and condensate. In a mixed stream of steam and condensate, steam will rise and condensate will fall. Mechanical traps are actuated by a device that rises and falls in relation to condensate level. The device is mechanically linked to a valve, and the position of the device changes the position of the valve. When the valve is open, condensate is allowed to exit the trap.

The most common types of mechanical steam traps are float and inverted bucket. The actuator, a ball float or upside-down "bucket", respectively, is buoyant and sits on the surface of the condensate–steam interface. When there is no condensate, the actuator keeps the valve closed. When the trap is full of condensate, the actuator keeps the valve open.

In 1870, inventor James H. Blessing patented the return steam trap, a mechanical trap that returned condensate to the boiler for re-use, which vastly improved the efficiency of steam engines.

=== Thermostatic traps ===
Thermostatic steam traps utilize the difference in temperature between steam and condensate. The valve is actuated by the expansion and contraction of an element that is exposed to the heat from the steam or condensate. These traps can use a filled element, bellows, or bimetallic element to respond to the difference in temperature. When steam first condenses, the liquid is the same temperature as the steam. Over time, the liquid condensate cools, while the steam remains the same temperature. When the temperature-sensitive element is exposed to the high temperature of steam it closes the valve. When the element is exposed to the cooled condensate, the valve opens and allows the condensate to leave.

=== Thermodynamic traps ===
Thermodynamic steam traps operate on the dynamic principles of steam vs condensate and the use of Bernoulli’s principle. When condensate is released through an orifice, the speed increases and a pressure drop occurs. This will flash steam to create higher pressure to close a valve (disc) or slow the discharge speed of the trap. The main types of traps in this family are disc, impulse, and labyrinth.

== Performance assessment of steam traps ==
There are basically three methods for the performance assessment of steam traps.

- Visual method – This method basically involves visual inspection requiring good observational skills. The person assessing the trap must be able to clearly distinguish between flash steam and live steam. Sight glasses can be used for assessment.
- Sound method – The mechanisms involved in the operation of steam traps generate sounds of sonic and supersonic frequencies. Using proper auditory equipment along with the knowledge of normal and abnormal sounds can help in efficient assessment of steam traps.
- Temperature method – This method is the least reliable of all the assessment methods. The low reliability of this method rests on the fact that the temperatures of the condensate and saturated steam are approximately the same, causing difficulties in distinguishing between them. Some mechanisms, like cold traps, are available for temperature assessment. The cold trap denotes the existence of a large amount of condensate which condensed during steam trap operation, hence required action may be taken for the same.
