= John Mosher Bailey =

American politician

John M. Bailey
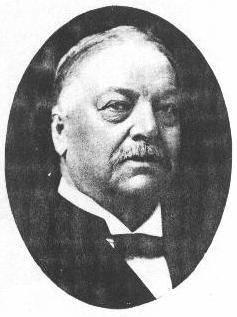

Member of the U.S. House of Representatives from New York's 16th district
- In office November 5, 1878 – March 3, 1881
- Preceded by: Terence J. Quinn
- Succeeded by: Michael N. Nolan

Personal details
- Born: John Mosher Bailey; August 24, 1838 Bethlehem, New York, US
- Died: February 21, 1916 (aged 77) Albany, New York, US
- Resting place: Elmwood Cemetery, Bethlehem, New York
- Party: Republican
- Spouse: Dell L. Hooker Bailey
- Children: 2
- Education: Union College, Schenectady, New York
- Profession: lawyer; politician; consulate

Military service
- Allegiance: United States
- Branch/service: United States Army
- Rank: first lieutenant adjutant
- Unit: One Hundred and Seventy-seventh Regiment, New York Volunteer Infantry
- Battles/wars: American Civil War

John Mosher Bailey (August 24, 1838 – February 21, 1916) was an American lawyer, Civil War veteran, and politician who represented New York in the United States House of Representatives from 1878 to 1881.

== Biography ==
Bailey was born in Bethlehem, New York. He attended the public schools, and Hudson River Institute at Claverack, New York. He graduated from Union College, Schenectady, New York, in 1861. He married Dell L. Hooker on September 21, 1864, and they had two children.

=== Civil War ===
During the American Civil War, he entered the Union Army as a first lieutenant and adjutant of the One Hundred and Seventy-seventh Regiment, New York Volunteer Infantry, and served in the Department of the Gulf in 1862.

=== Early career ===
After his service in the war, he graduated from the Albany Law School in 1864 and was admitted to the bar the same year. He commenced practice in Albany, New York. He was the assistant district attorney of Albany County, New York from 1865 to 1867, the collector of internal revenue from 1871 to 1874, and the district attorney of Albany County from 1874 to 1877.

=== Congress ===
Bailey was elected as a Republican to the Forty-fifth Congress to fill the vacancy caused by the death of Terence J. Quinn representing the sixteenth district of New York; and was re-elected to the Forty-sixth Congress. He served from November 5, 1878, to March 3, 1881, and was not a candidate for renomination in 1880.

=== Presidential appointments ===
After leaving Congress, Bailey was the United States consul to Hamburg, Germany, by appointment of President James Garfield, and served in that capacity from 1881 to 1885. He served as a delegate to the Republican National Convention in 1888 and was appointed by President Benjamin Harrison as surveyor of customs at Albany, New York from 1889 to 1894.

He later resumed the practice of law.

== Death and burial ==
Bailey died in Albany, Albany County, New York, on February 21, 1916 (age 77 years, 181 days). He is interred at Elmwood Cemetery, Bethlehem, New York.

U.S. House of Representatives
Preceded by Terence J. Quinn	Member of the U.S. House of Representatives from New York's 16th congressional district 1878–1881	Succeeded by Michael N. Nolan
