= Amaziah B. James =

American judge

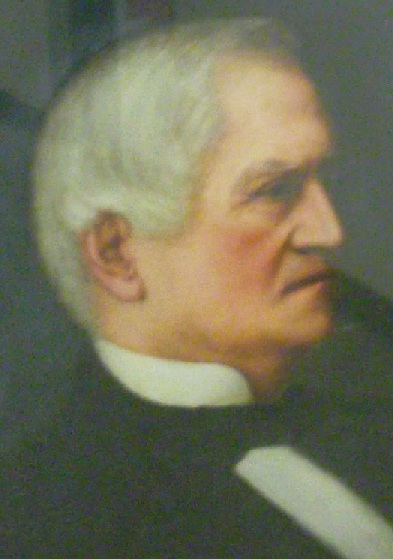
Amaziah Bailey James, Congressman and Judge

Amaziah Bailey James (July 1, 1812 in Stephentown, New York – July 6, 1883 in Ogdensburg, New York) was an American lawyer and politician from New York.

== Life ==
His family removed to Sweden, New York, in 1814. At the age of fourteen, he was apprenticed to a printer in Batavia, New York. He removed to Ogdensburg in 1831, and edited there the Northern Light, a weekly newspaper. He later became co-owner of the Times and Advertiser, the Whig paper of St. Lawrence County.

He became a captain of the Ogdensburg Artillery in 1836, and was later promoted to major general of the New York State Militia.

He studied law, was admitted to the bar in 1838, and commenced practice in Ogdensburg.

He was a justice of the New York Supreme Court (4th District) from 1854 to 1876, and was ex officio a judge of the New York Court of Appeals in 1861 and 1869. He was a member of the peace convention of 1861 held in Washington, D.C., in an effort to devise means to prevent the impending war.

James was elected as a Republican to the 45th and 46th United States Congresses, and served from March 4, 1877, to March 3, 1881. While serving his second term in Congress, he was stricken with "paralysis", from which he partially recovered.

He was buried at the City Cemetery in Ogdensburg.

== Sources ==
- United States Congress. "Amaziah B. James (id: J000044)". Biographical Directory of the United States Congress.
- The New York Civil List. compiled by Franklin Benjamin Hough. Weed, Parsons and Co. 1858. p. 351.
- http://www.courts.state.ny.us/history/elecbook/thereshallbe/pg92.htm Court of Appeals judges

U.S. House of Representatives
Preceded by William A. Wheeler	Member of the U.S. House of Representatives from New York's 19th congressional district 1877–1881	Succeeded by Abraham X. Parker
