= French Mills, New York =

Sawmill site in Guilderland Center

Coordinates: 42°42′41.634″N 73°59′19.5″W

French Mills, or French's Mills, was the site of a sawmill, which started making clothes in 1795 under its owner Peter K. Broek. It was sold to Abel French in 1800 and became a tavern that same year under Jacob Aker. It is located in Guilderland Center, New York.

It is unrelated to the French Mills that United States military forces retired to after the Battle of Crysler's Farm during the War of 1812.

Among the notable individuals from French Mills was James H. Blessing, who was born there and served as mayor of Albany, New York from 1900 to 1901.
