= James Kerrigan =

American politician

James Kerrigan (December 25, 1828 – November 1, 1899) was an American military veteran who served one term as a United States representative from New York from 1861 to 1863.

== Biography ==
He was born in New York City. He completed preparatory studies and attended Fordham College.

=== Military service ===
Kerrigan served in Company D, First Regiment, New York Volunteer Infantry, during the Mexican–American War. After the war, he accompanied the Walker filibustering expedition to Nicaragua as a captain and served for a brief period as alcalde of the Nicaraguan capital.

=== Political career ===
Kerrigan returned to New York City and was elected alderman of the sixth ward. He also served as clerk of the Manhattan Police Court.

Upon the outbreak of the American Civil War, he organized and then was commissioned Colonel of the 25th New York Volunteer Infantry Regiment, in the Union Army and served from May 19, 1861, until February 21, 1862.

Kerrigan was accused of harboring Confederate sympathies, and of not maintaining good order and discipline among his troops, and was allowed to resign his command.

=== Congress ===
He was elected as an Independent Democrat to the Thirty-seventh Congress (March 4, 1861 – March 3, 1863). While serving in the House, Kerrigan was arrested and removed from the floor for continuing to speak after his allotted time had expired in opposition to a bill funding the abolition of slavery in Missouri.

=== Later career ===
After leaving Congress, he became an enthusiastic Irish Nationalist and when the invasion of Canada was planned in 1866 led a company across the border. In 1867, he commanded the vessel Erin's Hope, which landed arms and ammunition on the Irish coast. He also accompanied an expedition to Alaska in 1899 and returned in bad health.

=== Death ===
He died in Brooklyn, New York November 1, 1899 and was buried in Saint Raymond's Cemetery.

U.S. House of Representatives
Preceded by Thomas J. Barr	Member of the U.S. House of Representatives from New York's 4th congressional district 1861–1863	Succeeded by Benjamin Wood
