= Nicholas T. Kane =

American businessman and politician (1846–1887)

Nicholas Thomas Kane
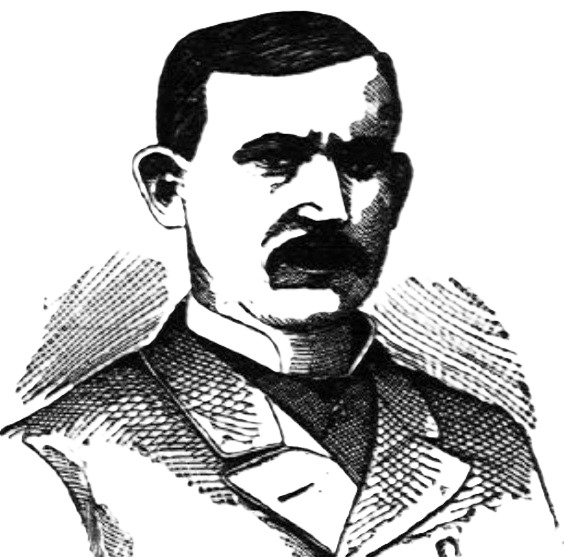
- The Argus (Albany, New York), 30 October 1886

Member of the U.S. House of Representatives from New York's 19th district
- In office March 4, 1887 – September 14, 1887
- Preceded by: John Swinburne
- Succeeded by: Charles Tracey

Personal details
- Born: September 12, 1846 County Waterford, Ireland, U.K.
- Died: September 14, 1887 (aged 41) Albany, New York, U.S.
- Cause of death: Tuberculosis
- Resting place: St. Agnes Cemetery, Colonie, New York, U.S.
- Party: Democratic

Nicholas Thomas Kane (September 12, 1846 – September 14, 1887) was an American Civil War veteran, businessman, and politician who served for six months as a U.S. representative from New York before dying during his first year in office in 1887.

== Life and career ==
Nicholas T. Kane was born in County Waterford in Ireland (then a part of the U.K.) on September 12, 1846. His family moved to the United States in 1848 and settled near Albany, New York, and Kane attended the local schools.

=== Civil War ===
He enlisted in the Union Army in 1863, joining the 20th New York Cavalry. He attained the rank of Corporal twice, and each time was reduced to Private. Kane served until the end of the war in 1865, and afterwards remained active in the Grand Army of the Republic.

=== Business career ===
After the war, Kane worked in woolen mills in New York and Rhode Island, as did several of his brothers and other relatives. He became wealthy as the owner and operator of several successful mills in New York.

=== Political career and death in office ===
A Democrat, Kane was Watervliet's Town Supervisor and represented Watervliet on the Albany County Board of Supervisors from 1883 to 1885. He was president of the county board in 1885.

In 1886 Kane was elected to the 50th United States Congress. He served from March 4, 1887, until his death from tuberculosis in Albany on September 14, 1887, before the Congressional session started. (At the time, elections were held in November, terms began the following March 4, and the Congressional session began in the following December.)

He was interred in St. Agnes Cemetery, Colonie, New York.

== See also ==
- List of members of the United States Congress who died in office (1790–1899)

U.S. House of Representatives
Preceded by John Swinburne	Member of the U.S. House of Representatives from New York's 19th congressional district March 4, 1887 – September 14, 1887	Succeeded by Charles Tracey
