= St. Agnes Cemetery =

Historic cemetery in Menands, New York

- U.S. National Register of Historic Places
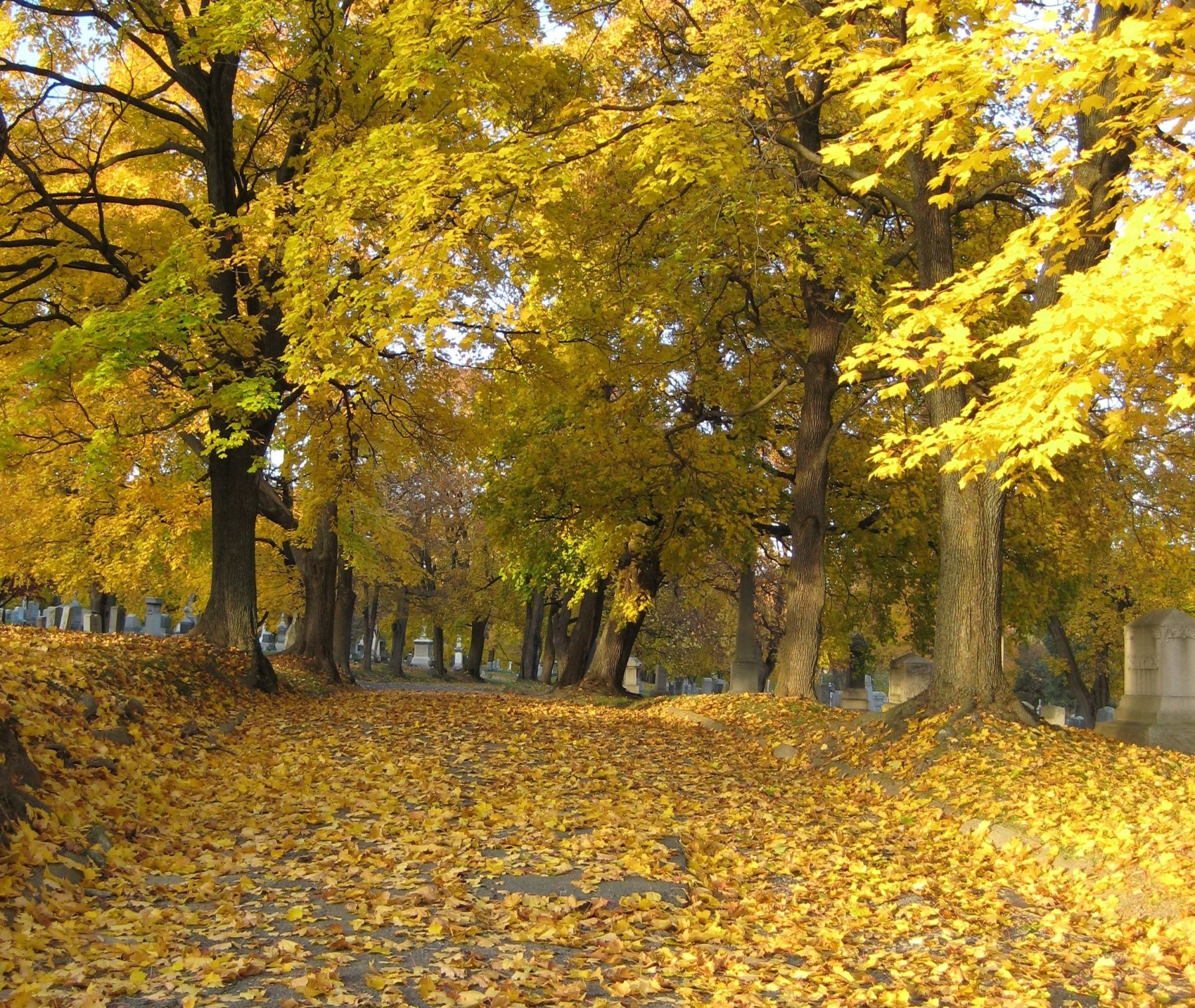
- Fall leaves in St. Agnes cemetery (Menands, NY)

- Location within New York Location within the United States
- Location: 48 Cemetery Ave., Menands, New York
- Coordinates: 42°42′7.81″N 73°43′40.83″W
- Area: 114 acres (46 ha)
- Built: 1867
- Architect: Grant, William H.; et al.
- NRHP reference No.: 08000095
- Added to NRHP: February 28, 2008

St. Agnes Cemetery is a 108-acre (44 ha) Catholic cemetery established in 1867. Located in Menands, New York, St. Agnes Cemetery is managed and cared for by Albany Diocesan Cemeteries.

St. Agnes Cemetery was consecrated in 1867 and has features characteristic of the rural cemetery movement. Like other landscapes of this genre, St. Agnes Cemetery was designed to portray order, symmetry, and peace. The history of the Capital Region is written on memorials throughout St. Agnes Cemetery.

It was listed on the National Register of Historic Places in 2008.

== Notable interments ==
- Anthony N. Brady, businessman
- Parker Dunn, Medal of Honor recipient
- Matty Fitzgerald, baseball player
- Martin Henry Glynn, Congressman, Governor of New York from 1913 to 1914
- John C. Heenan, Prize fighter
- Jack Joyce, Wild West performer and horse trainer
- Nicholas Thomas Kane, Congressman
- Mary Nash, actress
- Michael Nicholas Nolan, Congressman
- Leo William O'Brien, Congressman
- Terence J. Quinn, Congressman
- Artur Rodziński, conductor
- Charles Tracey, Congressman
- Anthony Ulasewicz, Watergate scandal figure
- Robert G. Vignola, actor and director
- Patrick H. White, Medal of Honor recipient
