= Anthony Ulasewicz =

New York City police officer and figure in Watergate scandal

Anthony Ulasewicz (December 14, 1918 in New York, United States – December 17, 1997 in Glens Falls, New York) was a figure in the Watergate scandal, delivering hundreds of thousands of dollars in "hush money" to Watergate defendants G. Gordon Liddy and E. Howard Hunt. He also investigated the lives of notable Democrats like Senator Edward M. Kennedy. He was of Polish descent.

He is buried in St. Agnes Cemetery, Menands, New York.
