= Abraham X. Parker =

American politician

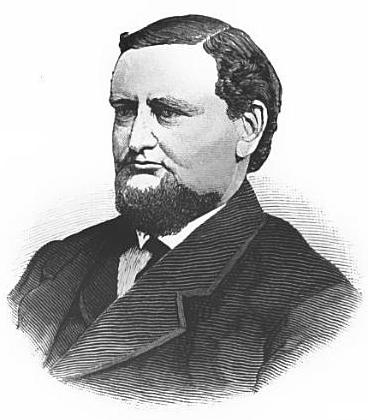
- Abraham X. Parker, New York Congressman

Member of the U.S. House of Representatives from New York
- In office March 4, 1881 – March 3, 1889
- Preceded by: Amaziah B. James
- Succeeded by: Frederick Lansing
- Constituency: 19th district (1881–85); 22nd district (1885–89)

Member of the New York State Senate from the 17th district
- In office 1868–1871
- Preceded by: Abel Godard
- Succeeded by: Wells S. Dickinson

Member of the New York State Assembly from the St. Lawrence County, 3rd District district
- In office 1863–1864
- Preceded by: Calvin T. Hulburd
- Succeeded by: Daniel Shaw

Personal details
- Born: November 14, 1831 Granville, Vermont, U.S.
- Died: August 9, 1909 (aged 77) Potsdam, New York, U.S.
- Resting place: Bayside Cemetery, Potsdam, New York, U.S.
- Party: Republican

Abraham X. Parker (November 14, 1831 – August 9, 1909) was an American lawyer and politician from New York. He was most notable for his service in the New York State Assembly (1863–1864), the New York State Senate (1867–1871), and the United States House of Representatives (1881–1889).

== Life ==
Parker was born in Granville, Vermont on November 14, 1831. He attended St. Lawrence Academy in Potsdam, New York and studied law with Henry L. Knowles. He then attended lectures at Albany Law School to complete his legal training, and was admitted to the bar in 1854.

After becoming an attorney, Parker practiced in Buffalo with the firm of Eli Cook and Freeman J. Fithian. He then practiced briefly in Syracuse before returning to Potsdam in 1856 to establish a firm in partnership with John G. McIntyre.

He was a member of the New York State Assembly (St. Lawrence Co., 3rd D.) in 1863 and 1864. Parker served as chairman of the Committee on Claims in his first term, and the committee on Commerce and Navigation in his second.

He was Postmaster of Potsdam from 1865 to 1866, and also served as a justice of the peace and as president of the Village of Potsdam. He was a member of the New York State Senate from 1868 to 1871. In the Senate, Parker served as chairman of the Committee on Insurance and Public Health. In 1876, Parker was a candidate to be one of New York's presidential electors, but Democratic nominee Samuel Tilden carried the state and received its electoral votes.

Parker was elected as a Republican to the 47th and to the three succeeding Congresses (March 4, 1881 – March 3, 1889). He was appointed by President Grover Cleveland as a member of the first labor investigation commission. He served as a delegate to the 1892 Republican National Convention and as First Assistant Attorney General from September 8, 1890, to March 4, 1893.

After leaving the Justice Department, Parker resumed the practice of law in Potsdam. A civic activist, he was the longtime chief engineer of Potsdam's volunteer fire department and a trustee of St. Lawrence Academy. In addition, he served as He served as president of the board of trustees for the Thomas S. Clarkson Memorial School of Technology and a member of the board of managers for the State Normal School in Potsdam.

Parker died in Potsdam on August 9, 1909. He was interred at Bayside Cemetery in Potsdam.

== Family ==
In 1857, Parker married Jenny Wright (1836–1919). Their children included Mabel, Thurlow, Jennie, Kittie, Harriet (Hattie), Alice and Bessie.

== Sources ==
=== Books ===
- Boone, H. H.; Cook, Theodore P. (1870). Life Sketches of Executive Officers and Members of the Legislature of the State of New York. Vol. III. Albany, NY: Weed, Parsons and Company.
- Cutter, William R. (1910). Genealogical and Family History of Northern New York. Vol. I. New York, NY: Lewis Historical Publishing Company – via HathiTrust.
- Spencer, Thomas E. (1998). Where They're Buried. Baltimore, MD: Clearfield Company. p. 248. ISBN 978-0-8063-4823-0.

=== Magazines ===
- "Death Notice, Abraham X. Parker". Clarkson Bulletin. Vol. 6. Potsdam, NY: Clarkson College of Technology. 1909.

New York State Assembly
Preceded by Calvin T. Hulburd	New York State Assembly; St. Lawrence County, 3rd District; 1863–1864	Succeeded by Daniel Shaw
New York State Senate
Preceded by Abel Godard	New York State Senate; 17th District; 1868–1871	Succeeded by Wells S. Dickinson
U.S. House of Representatives
Preceded by Amaziah B. James	Member of the U.S. House of Representatives from New York's 19th congressional district 1881–1885	Succeeded by John Swinburne
Preceded by Charles R. Skinner	Member of the U.S. House of Representatives from New York's 22nd congressional district 1885–1889	Succeeded by Frederick Lansing
