= 25th New York Infantry Regiment =

- Active: May 11, 1861, to June 26, 1863
- Country: United States
- Allegiance: Union
- Branch: Infantry
- Engagements: Battle of Gainesville; Second Battle of Bull Run; Battle of South Mountain; Battle of Antietam; Battle of Fredericksburg; Battle of Chancellorsville; Battle of Seven Pines; Battle of Hanover Court House

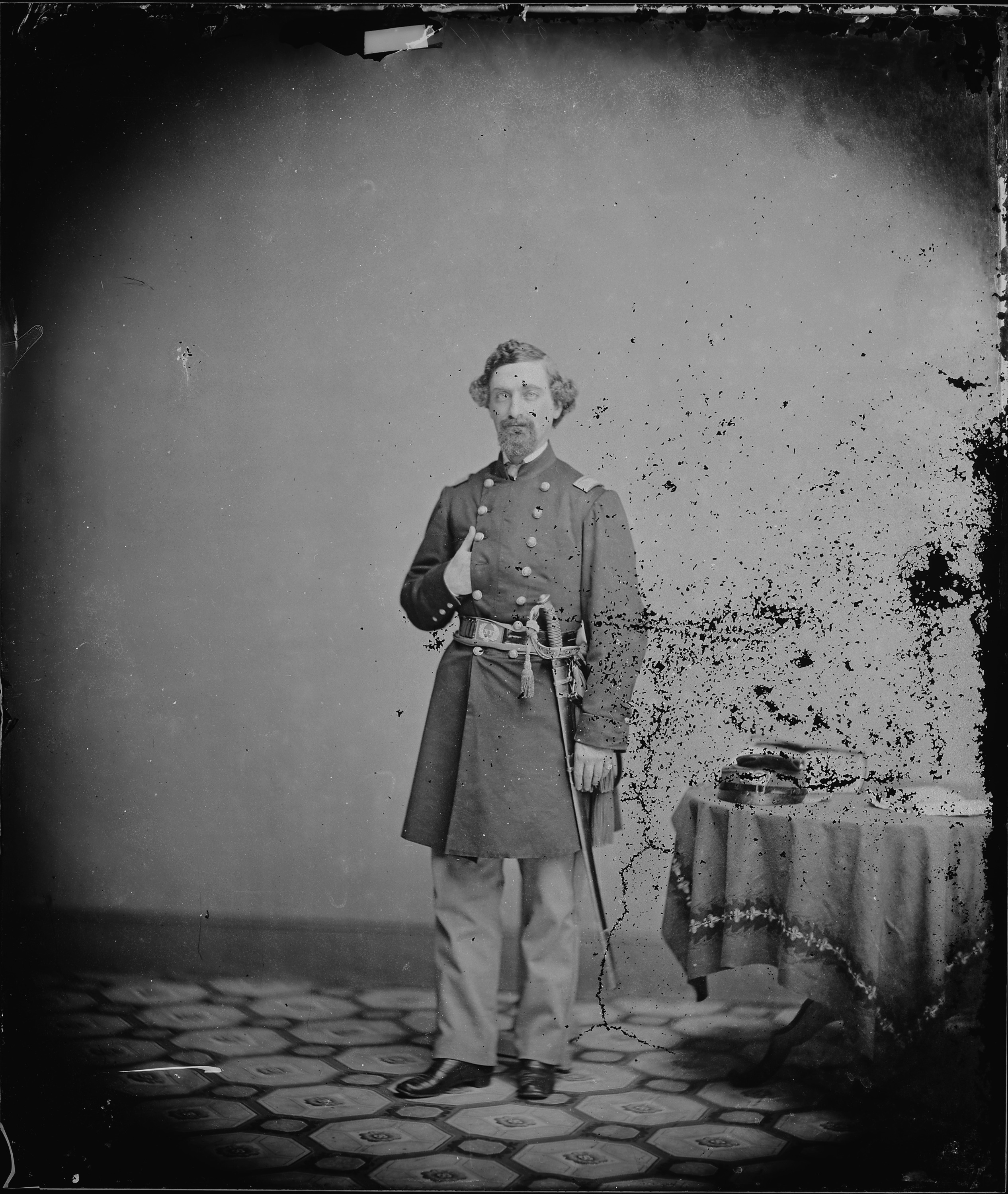
Col. Charles A. Johnson, 25th N.Y. Volunteers

The 25th New York Infantry Regiment, the "Union Rangers", was an infantry regiment that served in the Union Army during the American Civil War.

== Service ==
The regiment was organized in New York City, New York, on May 10, 1861, and was mustered in for a two-year enlistment on June 28, 1861.

The regiment was mustered out of service on June 26, 1863, and those men who had signed three year enlistments were transferred to the 44th New York.

== Total strength and casualties ==
The regiment suffered 7 officers and 54 enlisted men who were killed in action or mortally wounded and 4 officers and 25 enlisted men who died of disease, for a total of 90 fatalities.

== Commanders ==
- Colonel James E. Kerrigan
- Colonel Charles Adams Johnson

== See also ==
- List of New York Civil War regiments
