= Michael N. Nolan =

American politician (1833–1905)

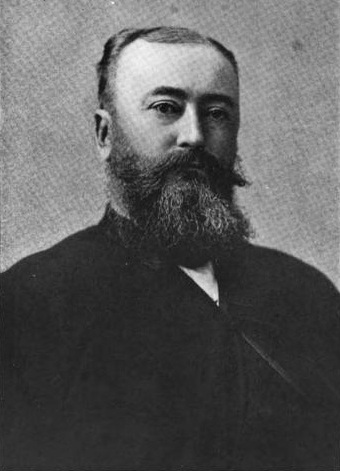

Member of the U.S. House of Representatives from New York's 16th district
- In office March 4, 1881 – March 3, 1883
- Preceded by: John Mosher Bailey
- Succeeded by: Thomas J. Van Alstyne

Personal details
- Born: Michael Nicholas Nolan; May 4, 1833 County Carlow, Ireland
- Died: May 31, 1905 (aged 72) Albany, New York
- Resting place: St. Agnes Cemetery, Menands, New York
- Citizenship: United States
- Party: Democratic Party
- Profession: businessman, banker, politician

Michael Nicholas Nolan (May 4, 1833 – May 31, 1905) was an American businessman and politician who served one term as a U.S. representative from New York State from 1881 to 1883, and as mayor of Albany, New York, the state capital, from 1878 to 1883.

== Biography ==
Nolan was born in County Carlow, Ireland. and immigrated to the United States at the age of ten. He attended the public schools in Albany. He studied with a local attorney but went to California during the Gold Rush without attaining admission to the bar.

== Career ==
In California, Nolan was employed on the street railway system of San Francisco and soon became manager.

Nolan returned to Albany where he was a partner in Beverwyck Brewery (aka Quinn and Nolan), became director of the National Savings Bank of Albany, and served as fire commissioner of Albany from 1869 to 1878.

=== Mayor of Albany ===
Elected as a Democrat, he was mayor of Albany from May 1878 to June 24, 1883, when he resigned.

=== Congress ===
Elected to the 47th United States Congress representing the Sixteenth District of New York, Nolan served from March 4, 1881, to March 3, 1883.

After leaving Congress he continued his business activities, and served as Mayor of Albany again from 1882 to 1883.

== Death ==
Nolan died in Albany on May 31, 1905 (age 72 years, 27 days). He is interred at St. Agnes Cemetery, Menands, New York.

Political offices
Preceded by Anthony Bleecker Banks	Mayor of Albany, New York; 1878–1883	Succeeded by John Swinburne
U.S. House of Representatives
Preceded by John Mosher Bailey	Member of the U.S. House of Representatives from New York's 16th congressional district March 4, 1881 – March 3, 1883	Succeeded by Thomas J. Van Alstyne
