= Thomas J. Van Alstyne =

American politician

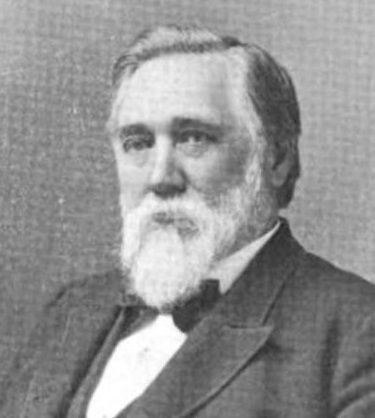

Mayor of Albany, New York
- In office 1898 – 1899
- Preceded by: John Boyd Thacher
- Succeeded by: James H. Blessing

Member of the U.S. House of Representatives from New York's 16th district
- In office March 4, 1883 – March 3, 1885
- Preceded by: Michael N. Nolan
- Succeeded by: John H. Ketcham

Personal details
- Born: Thomas Jefferson Van Alstyne; July 25, 1827 Richmondville, New York
- Died: October 26, 1903 (aged 76) Albany, New York
- Party: Democratic
- Spouses: Sarah Clapp (m. 1851; died 1859) Louise Peck (m. 1876; died 1884) Laura Louisa Wurdemann (m. 1886)
- Education: Hamilton College
- Occupation: Lawyer, judge

Military service
- Allegiance: United States
- Branch/service: Army
- Rank: Major
- Battles/wars: Civil War

Thomas Jefferson Van Alstyne (July 25, 1827 – October 26, 1903) was a U.S. representative from New York.

== Early life ==
Thomas Jefferson Van Alstyne was born on July 25, 1827, in Richmondville, New York. He was the son of Dr. Thomas B. Van Alstyne and Eliza Gile.

Van Alstyne attended the common schools, Moravia (New York) Academy, and Hartwick (New York) Seminary. In 1848 he graduated from Hamilton College in Clinton, New York. In 1851, he received his Master of Arts degree from Hamilton.

== Career ==
He studied law in Albany, New York, was admitted to the bar in 1849 and practiced in Albany. In 1848, he entered the law office of Harris and Van Vorst. In 1853, he was invited to and formed a partnership with Matthew McMahon.

He served as a Union Army judge advocate with the rank of major during the Civil War. He served as judge of Albany County from 1871 to 1882.

Van Alstyne was elected as a Democrat to the Forty-eighth Congress and served one term, March 4, 1883, to March 3, 1885. In Congress, he was a member of the Committee on Claims and the Committee on Expenditures of the Department of Justice. He was an unsuccessful candidate for reelection in 1884 to the Forty-ninth Congress and returned to the practice of law.

He served as mayor of Albany from 1898 to 1900. He won the Democratic primary for reelection but lost the election to James H. Blessing.

== Personal life ==
Val Alstyne was married three times. He married his first wife, Sarah Clapp (1832–1859), on September 3, 1851. Before her death, they had together:

- Thomas Butler Van Alstyne (1851–1927), who married Anna Richards.
- Charles Edwin Van Alstyne (1855–1858), who died young.

On October 25, 1876, he married his second wife, Louise Peck (1842–1884), daughter of Samuel S. Peck of Albany. After her death in 1884, he married his third wife, Laura Louisa Wurdemann (1849–1939), a daughter of William Wurdemann and Lydia Vanderbilt and a granddaughter of William Vanderbilt, on February 17, 1886. They were the parents of another son:

- William Thomas Van Alstyne (1887–1965).

He died in Albany on October 26, 1903. He was interred at Albany Rural Cemetery.

U.S. House of Representatives
Preceded by Michael N. Nolan	Member of the U.S. House of Representatives from New York's 16th congressional district 1883–1885	Succeeded by John H. Ketcham
Political offices
Preceded by John Boyd Thacher	Mayor of Albany, New York; 1898–1899	Succeeded by James H. Blessing
