= Jack Joyce (horse trainer) =

American horse trainer (1876–1934)

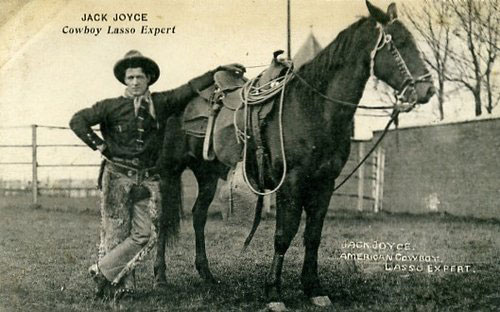
- Jack Joyce - American Cowboy
- Born: John Edward Joyce; February 10, 1876; Carnegie, Pennsylvania
- Died: June 16, 1934 (aged 58); Albany, New York
- Resting place: St. Agnes Cemetery, Menands, New York
- Occupation: Entertainer
- Known for: American Cowboy
- Height: 5 ft 8 in (173 cm)
- Spouses: Grace Gaylord (m. 1900; died 1906) Viola Mary Carey (m. 1908)
- Children: 5

John Edward Joyce (February 10, 1876 – June 16, 1934) was an American horse trainer. He was colorful figure in the world of horsemanship and animal training, who had nearly a ten-year career with Buffalo Bill on his Buffalo Bill's Wild West. Joyce toured throughout Europe until the late 1920s. He retired in upstate New York and died June 16, 1934.

== Biography ==
=== Early years ===
Joyce was born February 10, 1876, in Carnegie, Pennsylvania, to Patrick J. Joyce and Elizabeth Graham. Joyce turned from his parents' desire that he enter priesthood to a nearly a ten-year career with Col. Cody on his Buffalo Bill's Wild West. In 1896 he was listed in the route book of that show as an assistant in the Cody and Salisbury Horse Department. He eventually became a most daring bronco rider and appeared with Will Rogers in a roping and riding acts in New York theaters. Around that time, he decided to go to Europe rather than start a career in Hollywood movies.

=== Europe ===
In 1909 Joyce was in Berlin, Germany, on Circus Busch. On his famous horse, "Two Step", he was hailed as the first bucking horse rider and roper to appear in Europe. In Denmark, Jack became a good friend of young Prince Christian of Schaumburg-Lippe. The Prince presented him with a diamond scarf pin in the shape of a horseshoe superimposed with a whip. However, it seems doubtful if this anecdote regarding Jack Joyce's relationship with Prince Christian and the gift from the Prince is true. In 1911 still on Circus Busch with his horses, he presented a type of wild west drama with some 20 characters.

In January 1912 Jack Joyce's Wild West Show was appearing at Coliseum in London. Later, in May of that year, it was the big attraction at the New Hippodrome Palast in Berlin. The popular American cowboy had with him about a half dozen boys from Texas and a troupe of fake Indians. The "demand for a wild west show is so great that the Germans don't worry about the genuineness of the red skin--all they want is the excitement connected with the show." Joyce had a pretty strong feeling for cowgirls. Although they were not easily found in Berlin, he did not worry. He made a selection among a throng of Berlin maidens and trained them to be cowgirls. In 1916 Jack Joyce was doing well with his circus and wild west show touring Sweden.

=== Return to America ===
Early in 1925 Joyce returned with his 9 thoroughbreds to the United States on the SS California from an extended engagement in London. It was a very rough passage. Captain James Blaike had to transfer the animals from improvised stalls on the shelter deck to an inner freight square on another deck.

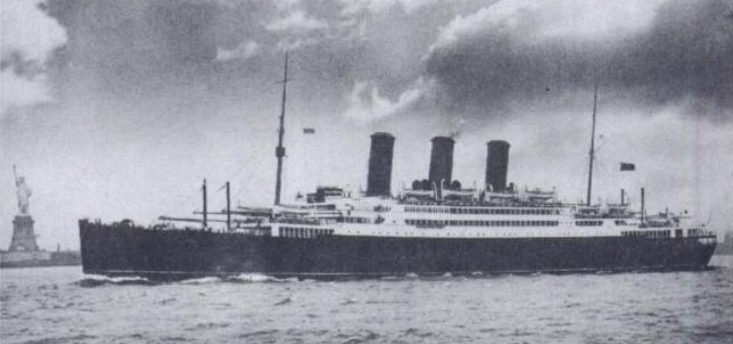
SS California in 1925

Beginning at the end of January, he performed with his Wonder Horses for several weeks on the Keith-Albee-Orpheum Circuit at the New York Hippodrome. His 15-minute presentation was far above the average horse act, but did not begin to compare with John Aggee's equines that had appeared previously in the same setting at the Hippodrome. The two acts were different. Joyce's presentation was the typical circus offering of the kind where the animals followed set routines. It opened with a high school turn with various types of 1 and 2 steps to music with Joyce in the saddle. Then Jack dismounted and put his black steed through a ritual where it knelt and ran between 2 cannons in the ring. Carrying flags it jumped over the cannons and fired them. Later in the engagement, Joyce, for the sake of a smoother presentation, replaced this part of the act with a riding turn. Next, the drollery of an English comic brought forth mild laughter. Cossack trick riding with various unique feats scored well as the horse and rider raced around the ring. Following came 6 showy equines with royal plumes and glittering harness. They did a nice drill which ended with their marching on the rim of the ring curb. The horses were somewhat hesitant in their movements and notably nervous, probably as a result of experiencing the very rough ocean crossing just two weeks earlier.
Later, R.C. Carlisle wrote from Buffalo, New York: "Recently dropped in backstage at, Shea's Theatre, Toronto to say hello to Jack Joyce, old timer of the Wild West, who has been in Europe for a number of years. Jack now has a real European act of highly schooled horses and a Russian Cossack trick rider.... Joyce's horses are beautiful black thoroughbreds that will rank with the best in Europe."

In December 1925 the following ad appeared in Billboard (magazine): "Jack Joyce's 10 circus horses for sale or open bookings. They do 6 different numbers numbers. Two high school horses and a group of 8 beautiful Blacks booked from Europe and classes as the best horse act in America. Just finished 32 weeks at Keith-Albee-Orpheum and 6 weeks World Amusement Service Association Fairs at a salary of $1250 and $1500 weekly, respectively, plus transportation. Have all harness, trappings and complete equipment for proper presentation of act. Will sell or engage them any time after January 1, 1926 for Park, Fairs & Amusement Places. Permanent Address: Jack Joyce, 2034 Grand Concourse, Bronx, New York".

=== Later life ===
Except for one brief return trip to Europe in 1928, Joyce spent the rest of his career in the United States. He established stables in Albany, New York, and exhibited at fairs. After sustaining severe financial losses, he retired in 1932.

An interesting anecdote was related in 1930. Many years previously, as a youth when playing county fairs, he "followed the avocation of wild horse salesman, which furnished plenty of thrill and not so much remuneration. At fairs he would give demonstrations of cowboy sports in front of grandstands that wowed'em. The only item he carried with his one man Wild West opry was a suitcase. Jack's favorite stunt was to go among the farmers' horses parked on the fairgrounds and select horses he needed most for his act. At the conclusion of the act, he would return the horses to their respective places. Many of the farmers, however, thought they recognized their favorite steeds in Jack's act and they would compliment on the splendid appearance of his stock."

Jack Joyce, Prayer Card

=== Injury ===
While in Europe with a show, Joyce was injured from a bucking horse in Brussels. An expert of Papers of Will Rogers : Wild West and Vaudeville, April 1904-September 1908 describes the incident from a postcard Will Rogers received from Joyce, who was a friend of Rogers during his rodeo days:

(Written on front of card)
"Dear Billie, Just a card as souvenir of what Texas Pete done to me. I hope you are well. I am getting Better as Ever." Old Jack Joyce

March 5, 1908, Souvenir of Brussels
Kicked By Bucking Horse. Operated on same night. Gave up by doctors. Had 2 bones taken out of head. In Hospital 27 days and the worst of it all, I lost my curls and now can't cop any swell dames.

children: Maude, Jack, and Violet

=== Personal life and death ===
John E. Joyce died in Albany, New York, on June 16, 1934, after several years of illness. He and his first wife, Grace Gaylord, divorced in 1906, just six years after their marriage. From this union there was one daughter, Evelyn. Two years later Jack remarried, this time to Viola Mary Carey, with whom he had three children, John (Jack), Violet, and Maude. His widow and four children survived him. His funeral was from St. Vincent de Paul's Church in Albany with burial in St. Agnes Cemetery. During his stay in Denmark he had a daughter out of wedlock: Eva Lillian (1919–1962). The mother was Edith Mary Johanne Brandt. Eva was adopted by Anton and Anne Margrethe Christensen but knew that Jack Joyce was her father.
