= Impeachment of Andrew Johnson =

1868 US charging of president

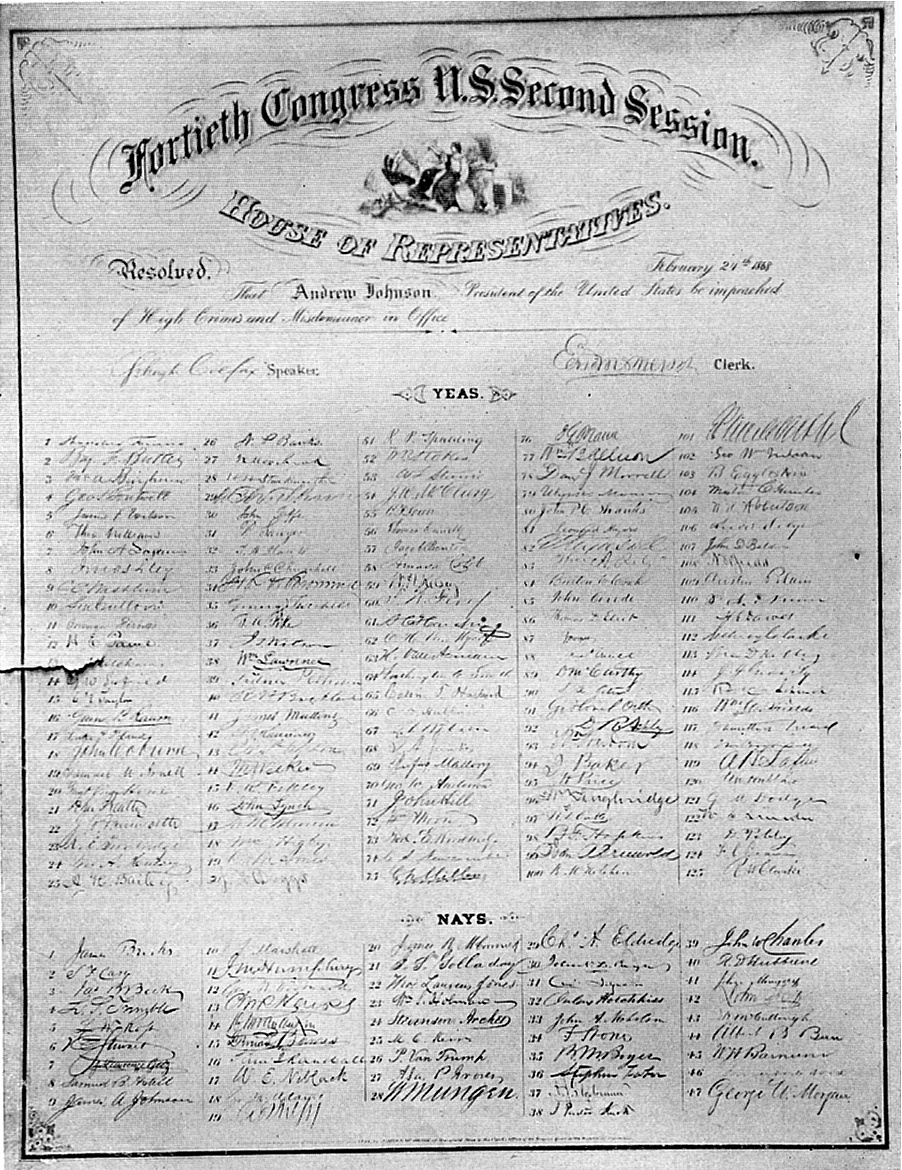
- Copy of the House resolution to impeach President Johnson, adopted February 24, 1868
- Accused: Andrew Johnson, 17th president of the United States
- Date: February 24, 1868 to May 26, 1868
- Outcome: Acquitted by the U.S. Senate, remained in office
- Charges: Eleven high crimes and misdemeanors
- Cause: Violating the Tenure of Office Act by attempting to replace Edwin Stanton, the secretary of war, while Congress was not in session and other alleged abuses of presidential power

Key congressional votes

Voting in the U.S. House of Representatives
- Accusation: High crimes and misdemeanors
- Votes in favor: 126
- Votes against: 47
- Result: Approved resolution of impeachment

Voting in the U.S. Senate
- Accusation: Article XI
- Votes in favor: 35 "guilty"
- Votes against: 19 "not guilty"
- Result: Acquitted (36 "guilty" votes necessary for a conviction)
- Accusation: Article II
- Votes in favor: 35 "guilty"
- Votes against: 19 "not guilty"
- Result: Acquitted (36 "guilty" votes necessary for a conviction)
- Accusation: Article III
- Votes in favor: 35 "guilty"
- Votes against: 19 "not guilty"
- Result: Acquitted (36 "guilty" votes necessary for a conviction)
- The Senate held a roll call vote on only 3 of the 11 articles before adjourning as a court.

The impeachment of Andrew Johnson for "high crimes and misdemeanors" was initiated by the United States House of Representatives on February 24, 1868. The alleged high crimes and misdemeanors were afterwards specified in eleven articles of impeachment adopted by the House on March 2 and 3, 1868. The primary charge against Johnson was that he had violated the Tenure of Office Act by replacing Edwin Stanton, Secretary of War, with Lorenzo Thomas ad interim. The Act had been passed by Congress in March 1867, Johnson's veto overruled, with the primary intent of protecting Stanton from being fired without the Senate's consent. Stanton often sided with the Radical Republican faction and had a good relationship with Johnson.

Johnson was the first United States president to be impeached. After the House formally adopted the articles of impeachment, they forwarded them to the United States Senate for adjudication. The trial in the Senate began on March 5, with Chief Justice Salmon P. Chase presiding. On May 16, the Senate voted against convicting Johnson on one of the articles, with its 35–19 vote in favor of conviction falling one vote short of the necessary two-thirds majority. A 10-day recess of the Senate trial was called to before reconvening to convict him on additional articles. On May 26, the Senate voted against convicting the president on two more articles by margins identical to the first vote. After this, the trial was adjourned sine die without votes being held on the remaining eight articles of impeachment.

The impeachment and trial of Andrew Johnson had important political implications for the balance of federal legislative-executive power. It maintained the principle that Congress should not remove the president from office simply because its members disagreed with him over policy, style, and administration of the office. It also resulted in diminished presidential influence on public policy and overall governing power, fostering a system of governance which future-president Woodrow Wilson referred to in the 1880s as "Congressional Government".

== Background ==
=== Presidential Reconstruction ===
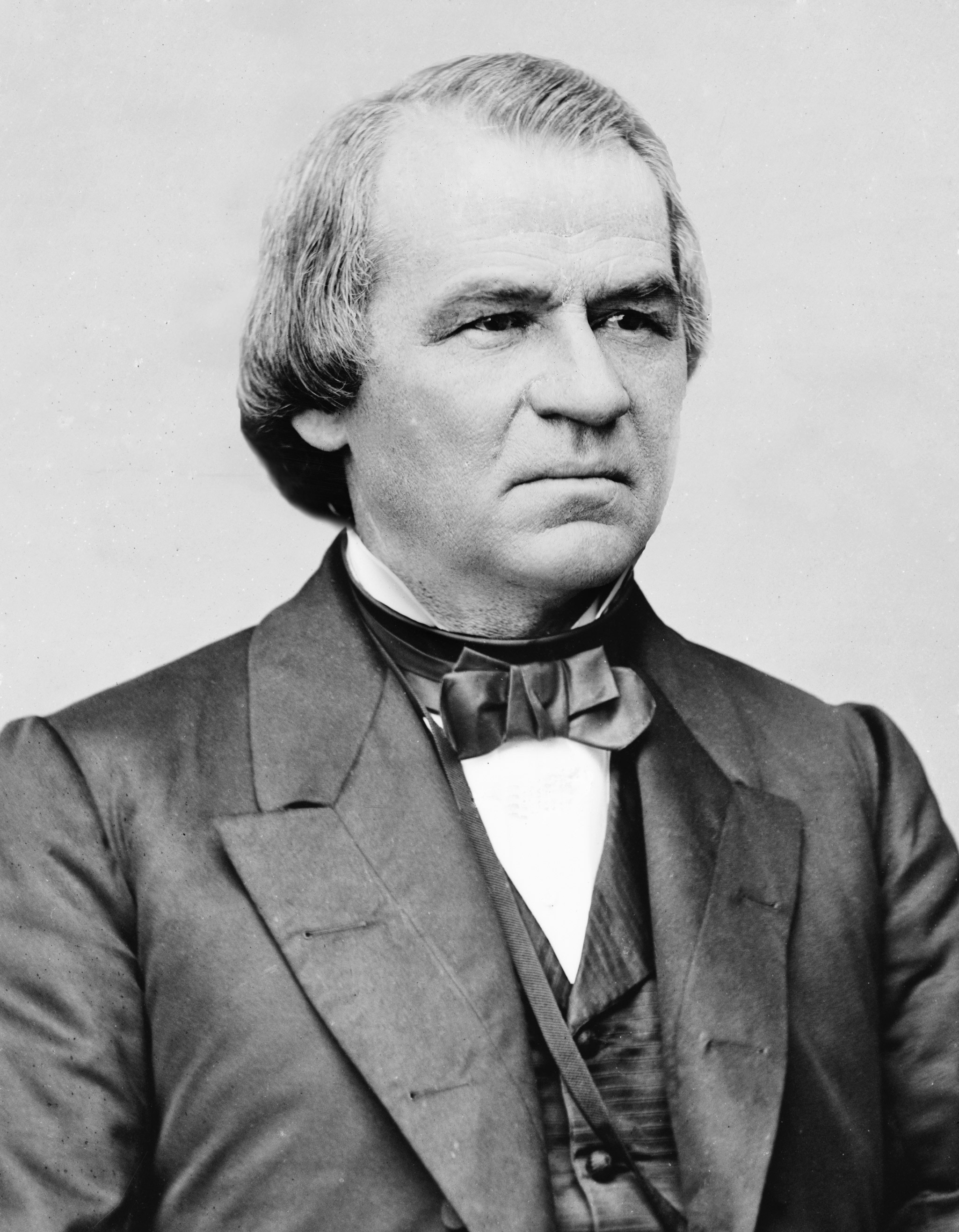
President Andrew Johnson

Tensions between the executive and legislative branches had been high prior to Johnson's ascension to the presidency. Following Union Army victories at Gettysburg and Vicksburg in July 1863, President Lincoln began contemplating the issue of how to bring the South back into the Union. He wished to offer an olive branch to the rebel states by pursuing a lenient plan for their reintegration. The forgiving tone of the president's plan, plus the fact that he implemented it by presidential directive without consulting Congress, incensed Radical Republicans, who countered with a more stringent plan. Their proposal for Southern reconstruction, the Wade–Davis Bill, passed both houses of Congress in July 1864, but was pocket vetoed by the president and never took effect.

The assassination of Abraham Lincoln on April 14, 1865, just days after the Army of Northern Virginia's surrender at Appomattox, briefly lessened the tension over who would set the terms of peace. The Radicals, while suspicious of new president Andrew Johnson and his policies, believed based on his record that he would defer or at least acquiesce to their hardline proposals. Though a Tennessee Democrat, Johnson had fiercely criticized Southern secession. After Tennessee joined the states leaving the Union, he chose to stay in Washington, rather than resign his U.S. Senate seat. Later, when Union troops occupied Tennessee, Johnson was appointed military governor. He exercised his powers in that office vigorously, frequently stating that "treason must be made odious and traitors punished".

After Johnson became president, however, he embraced Lincoln's more lenient policies, thus rejecting the Radicals and setting the stage for a showdown with Congress. During the first months of his presidency, Johnson issued proclamations of general amnesty for most former Confederates, both government and military officers, and oversaw creation of new governments in the hitherto rebellious states—governments dominated by ex-Confederate officials. In February 1866, Johnson vetoed legislation extending the Freedmen's Bureau and expanding its powers; Congress was unable to override the veto. Afterward, Johnson denounced Radical Republicans Representative Thaddeus Stevens and Senator Charles Sumner, along with abolitionist Wendell Phillips, as traitors. Later, Johnson vetoed a Civil Rights Act and a second Freedmen's Bureau bill. The Senate and the House each mustered the two-thirds majority necessary to override both vetoes.

At an impasse with Congress, Johnson offered himself directly to the American public as a "tribune of the people". In the late summer of 1866, the president embarked on a national "Swing Around the Circle" speaking tour, where he asked his audiences for their support in his battle against the Congress and urged voters to elect representatives to Congress in the upcoming midterm election who supported his policies. The tour backfired on Johnson, however, when reports of his undisciplined, vitriolic speeches and ill-advised confrontations with hecklers swept the nation. Contrary to his hopes, the 1866 elections led to veto-proof Republican majorities in both houses of Congress. As a result, Radicals were able to take control of Reconstruction, passing a series of Reconstruction Acts—each one over the president's veto—addressing requirements for Southern states to be fully restored to the Union. The first of these acts divided those states, excluding Johnson's home state of Tennessee, into five military districts, and each state's government was put under the control of the U.S. military. Additionally, these states were required to enact new constitutions, ratify the Fourteenth Amendment, and guarantee voting rights for black males.

=== Previous efforts to impeach Johnson ===
==== First inquiry ====
On January 7, 1867, the House of Representatives voted to launch an impeachment inquiry against Johnson, to be run by the House Committee on the Judiciary. Since the resolution only created an inquiry and did not actually directly impeach the president as many Radical Republicans wanted to do, it was seen as offering Republicans a chance to register their displeasure with Johnson without actually formally impeaching him. Many Republicans felt safe in the belief that any impeachment resolution would die a quiet death in the Judiciary Committee. The House Committee on the Judiciary initially sided 4–5 on June 3, 1867, against recommending forwarding articles of impeachment to the full House. However, on November 25, 1867, the House Committee on the Judiciary, which had not previously forwarded the result of its inquiry to the full House, reversed their previous decision due to a change of mind by one of its member and voted 5–4 to recommend impeachment. In a December 7, 1867, vote, the full House rejected impeachment by a 108–57 vote in which more Republicans voted against impeachment than for it.

==== Launch of a second inquiry ====
On January 27, 1868, Rufus P. Spalding moved that the rules be suspended so that he could present a resolution resolving that the House Select Committee on Reconstruction be authorized to conduct a new impeachment inquiry into Johnson for, "what combinations have been made or attempted to be made to obstruct the due execution of the laws," and that the committee have leave to report at any time. The motion to consider the resolution was agreed to by a vote of 103–37, and the House voted to approve the resolution by a vote of 99–31. No Democrats voted for the resolution, while the only Republicans who cast votes against it were Elihu B. Washburne and William Windom. On February 10, 1868, the House voted to transfer any further responsibility over impeachment away from the Committee on the Judiciary and to the Select Committee on Reconstruction.

Despite Thadeus Stevens being the chair of the committee, the membership of the House Committee on Reconstruction was not initially favorable to impeachment. It had four (Republican) members that had voted for impeachment in December 1867, and five members (three Republicans and two Democrats) that had voted against it. At a February 13, 1868, committee meeting, a vote on a motion to table consideration of a resolution proposed by Stevens to impeach Johnson had effectively signaled that five of the committee's members still stood opposed to impeachment, unchanged in their position since the December 1867 vote. After the February 13 vote, it momentarily appeared that the prospect of impeachment was dead.

=== Tenure of Office Act ===
Congress' control of the military Reconstruction policy was mitigated by Johnson's command of the military as president. However, Johnson had inherited Lincoln's appointee Edwin M. Stanton as secretary of war. Stanton was a staunch Radical Republican who would comply with congressional Reconstruction policies as long as he remained in office. To ensure that Stanton would not be replaced, Congress passed the Tenure of Office Act in 1867 over Johnson's veto. The act required the president to seek the Senate's advice and consent before relieving or dismissing any member of his cabinet (an indirect reference to Stanton) or, indeed, any federal official whose initial appointment had previously required its advice and consent.

=== Johnson's dismissal of Secretary of War Stanton ===
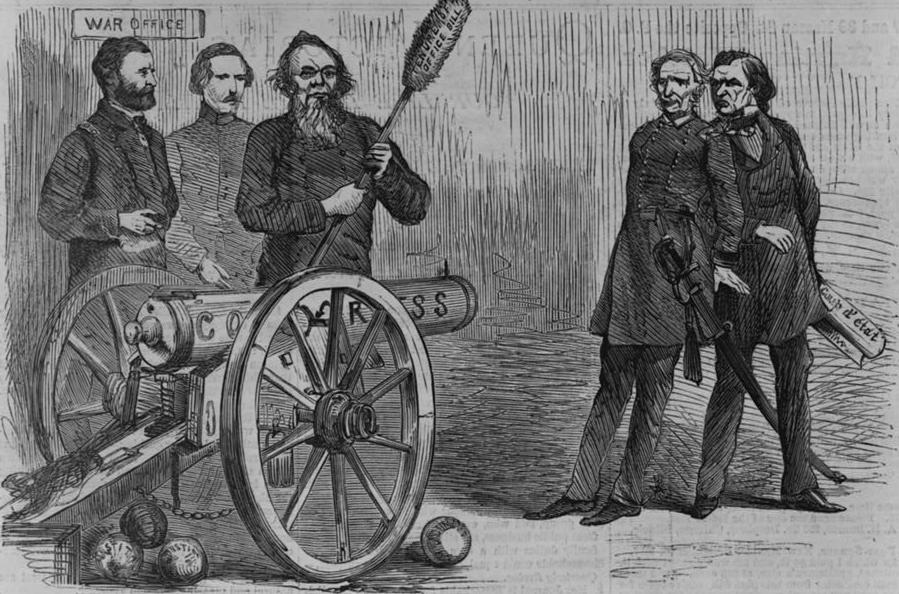
"The Situation", a Harper's Weekly editorial cartoon shows Secretary of War Stanton aiming a cannon labeled "Congress" to defeat Johnson. The rammer is "Tenure of Office Bill" and cannonballs on the floor are "Justice".

The Tenure of Office Act was put in place to prevent the president from dismissing an officer that had been previously appointed with the advice and consent of the Senate without the Senate's approval to remove them. Per the law, if the president dismissed such an officer when the Senate was in recess, and the Senate voted upon reconvening against ratifying the removal, the president would be required to reinstate the individual. Because the Tenure of Office Act did permit the president to suspend such officials when Congress was out of session, after Johnson failed to obtain Stanton's resignation, he instead suspended Stanton on August 5, 1867, which gave him the opportunity to appoint General Ulysses S. Grant, then serving as commanding general of the Army, to serve as the interim secretary of war. When the Senate adopted a resolution of non-concurrence with Stanton's dismissal in December 1867, Grant told Johnson he was going to resign, fearing punitive legal action. Contrary to Johnson's belief that Grant had agreed to remain in office, when the Senate voted and reinstated Stanton in January 1868, Grant immediately resigned, before the president had an opportunity to appoint a replacement. Johnson was furious at Grant, accusing him of lying during a stormy cabinet meeting. The March 1868 publication of several angry messages between Johnson and Grant led to a complete break between the two. As a result of these letters, Grant solidified his standing as the front-runner for the 1868 Republican presidential nomination.

Johnson complained about Stanton's restoration to office and searched desperately for someone to replace Stanton who would be acceptable to the Senate. He first proposed the position to General William Tecumseh Sherman, an enemy of Stanton, who turned down his offer. Sherman subsequently suggested to Johnson that Radical Republicans and moderate Republicans would be amenable to replacing Stanton with Jacob Dolson Cox, but he found the president to be no longer interested in appeasement. On February 21, 1868, the president appointed Lorenzo Thomas, a brevet major general in the Army, as secretary of war ad interim. Johnson thereupon informed the Senate of his decision. Thomas personally delivered the president's dismissal notice to Stanton, who rejected the legitimacy of the decision. Rather than vacate his office, Stanton barricaded himself inside and ordered Thomas arrested for violating the Tenure of Office Act. Thomas remained under arrest for several days before being released, and having the charge against him dropped after Stanton realized that the case against Thomas would provide the courts with an opportunity to review the constitutionality of the Tenure of Office Act.

Johnson's opponents in Congress were outraged by his actions; the president's challenge to congressional authority—with regard to both the Tenure of Office Act and post-war reconstruction—had, in their estimation, been tolerated for long enough. In swift response, an impeachment resolution was introduced in the House by Representatives Thaddeus Stevens and John Bingham. Expressing the widespread sentiment among House Republicans, Representative William D. Kelley (on February 22, 1868) declared:

Sir, the bloody and untilled fields of the ten unreconstructed states, the unsheeted ghosts of the two thousand murdered negroes in Texas, cry, if the dead ever evoke vengeance, for the punishment of Andrew Johnson.

== Passage of the impeachment resolution ==
=== Presentation of the resolution by John Covode ===
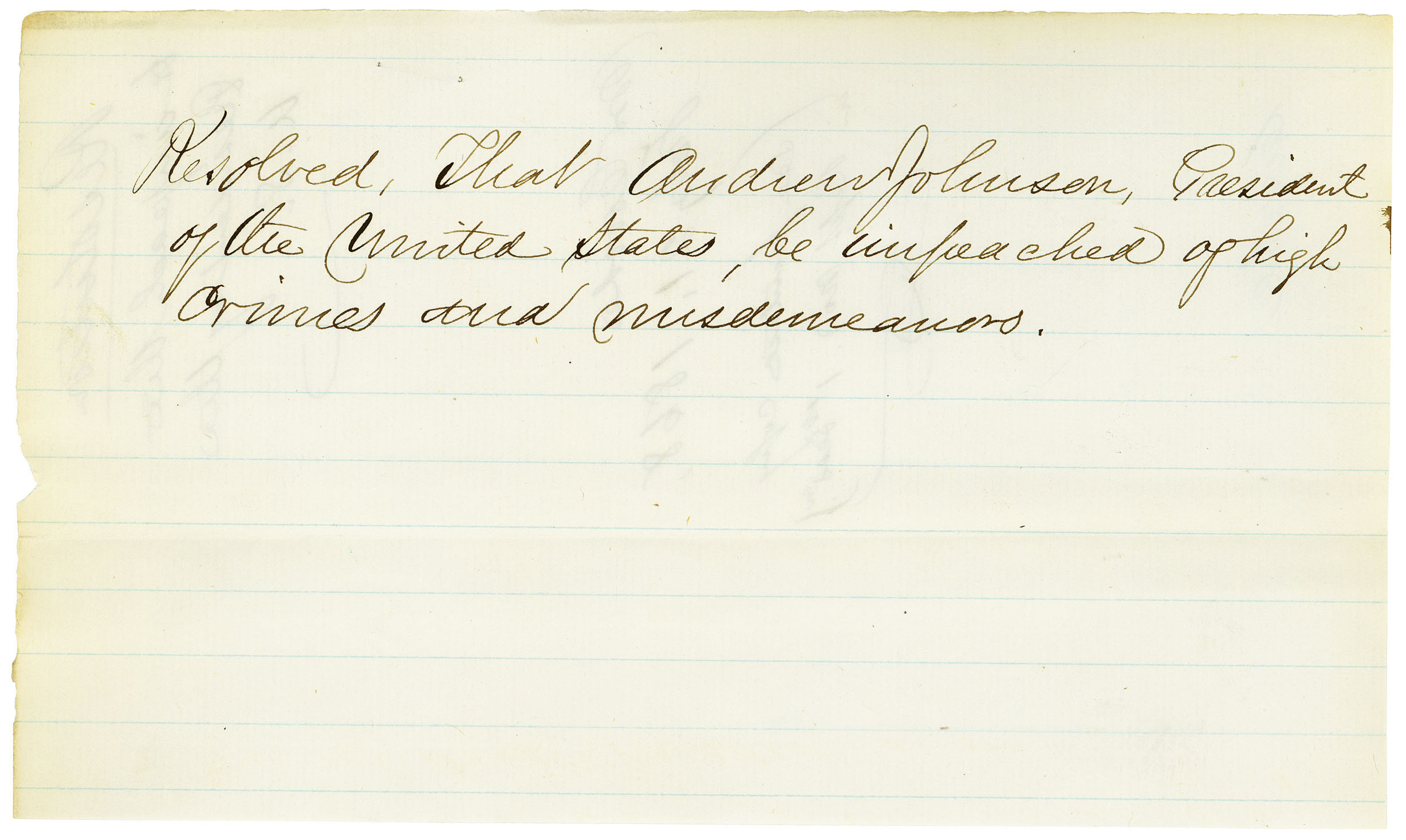
John Covode's single sentence impeachment resolution, presented on February 21, 1868

On February 21, 1868, the day that Johnson attempted to replace Stanton with Lorenzo Thomas, the chair of the Select Committee on Reconstruction, Radical Republican Thaddeus Stevens, submitted a resolution to the House resolving that the evidence taken on impeachment by the previous (1867) impeachment inquiry run by the Committee on the Judiciary be referred to the Select Committee on Reconstruction, which was overseeing the ongoing second impeachment inquiry. Stevens' resolution also resolved that the Committee on Reconstruction "have leave to report at any time". The resolution was approved by the House. Soon after, a one sentence resolution to impeach Johnson, written by John Covode, was presented to the House. The resolution read,

Resolved, That Andrew Johnson, President of the United States, be impeached of high crimes and misdemeanors.

No charges were specified in the resolution by Covode. News reports stated that the introduction of the resolution was met with audible laughter by Democratic members of the House. George S. Boutwell made a successful motion to refer the resolution to the Select Committee on Reconstruction. Because the resolution had been presented in the late afternoon, the house adjourned without the question being brought to a vote on whether to adopt it. But there was an expectation that it would be debated following day and soon after brought to such a vote.

=== Committee approval of the resolution ===
In the morning of February 22, 1868, the Committee on Reconstruction approved an amended version of the impeachment resolution in a 7–2 party-line vote. The amended resolution read,

Resolved, That Andrew Johnson, President of the United States, be impeached of high crimes and misdemeanors in office.

=== House debate ===
At 3pm on February 22, 1868, along with the slightly amended version of Covode's impeachment resolution, Stevens presented a majority report from the Select Committee on Reconstruction opining that Johnson should be impeached for high crimes and misdemeanors. The impeachment resolution was debated at length on both February 22 and 24. During the debate on the resolution, Republican members of the House Select Committee on Reconstruction argued that Johnson's effort to dismiss Stanton and appoint Thomas ad interim was a specific violation of the Tenure of Office Act.

Republicans that had voted against the previous impeachment resolution on December 7, 1867, now voiced support for impeaching Johnson, seeing an impeachment of Johnson for violating the Tenure of Office Act as being grounded in an offense indictable under federal law. James F. Wilson expressed an opinion representative of those expressed during debate by many Republicans that had previously voted against the impeachment resolution brought by the Judiciary Committee at the close of the first impeachment inquiry against Johnson. Ahead of the vote on that previous resolution, Wilson had been tasked by the Judiciary Committee's dissenting members with presenting their argument against impeaching Johnson at that time. Now Wilson expressed support for impeaching Johnson, declaring that,

The considerations which weighed upon my mind and molded my conduct in the case with which the Committee on the Judiciary of this House was charged are not to be found in the present case.

Wilson opined that in the previous impeachment vote, Johnson had not committed any action that was a crime under either common law or statute. Wilson declared that Johnson had mistakenly been emboldened after he was not impeached in December 1867 and had proceeded to commit an act that constituted clear impeachable conduct, declaring,

He mistook our judgment for cowardice, and worked on until he has presented to us, as a sequence, a high misdemeanor known to the law and defined by statute.

Thaddeus Stevens expressed his opinion that impeachment was a purely political process. In the closing remarks of formal debate, Stevens expressed his opinion that the case to be brought against Johnson should be broader than just his violation of the Tenure of Office Act. Before the resolution would be voted on by the House, Thaddeus Stevens, who is considered to have been the leader of the forces behind the push for impeachment, gave a final speech that is described as having brought those in the House chamber to "rapt attention". In the speech, Stevens remarked,

This is not to be the temporary triumph of a political party, but is to endure in its consequence until this whole continent shall be filled with a free and untrammeled people or shall be a nest of shrinking, cowardly slaves.

=== Vote ===
The resolution was put to a vote on February 24, 1868, three days after Johnson moved to dismiss and replace Stanton. Per the record of the Congressional Globe, the House of Representatives voted 126–47 (with 17 members not voting) in favor of a resolution to impeach the president for high crimes and misdemeanors, This marked the first time that a president of the United States had been impeached. There is a record keeping discrepancy, however. While the Congressional Globe recorded the vote as being 126–47 (with Republicans William Henry Koontz and Francis Thomas being absent), the United States House Journal had recorded the vote as being 128–47 (recording Koontz and Thomas as being present and voting in support of the resolution). The Office of the House Historian uses the Congressional Globe tally on its website.

Almost all of the House Republican caucus that was present voted in support of the impeachment resolution. While every vote cast by those that were elected as a member of the Republican Party was in support of the impeachment resolution, Samuel Fenton Cary (an independent Republican from Ohio), and Thomas E. Stewart (a "Conservative Republican" from New York) voted against it. Both Cary and Stewart caucused with the Republicans. Every Democrat present voted against impeachment. Fifteen Republicans and one Democrat were absent for the vote. Speaker Schuyler Colfax, a Republican, also did not vote, as House rules do not require the speaker to vote during ordinary legislative proceedings unless their vote would be decisive or if the vote is being cast by ballot.

All of the 126 votes in favor of impeachment came from members of the Republican caucus (125 from members of the Republican Party, and one from independent Republican Lewis Selye). Of the 47 votes against impeachment, 44 came from members of the Democratic Party, with the other three votes coming from Conservative Charles E. Phelps, Conservative Republican Thomas E. Stewart, and independent Republican Fenton Cary.

Resolution providing for the impeachment of Andrew Johnson, President of the United States (Note: There is a record keeping discrepancy for the February 24, 1868 vote to impeach Johnson. While the Congressional Globe recorded the vote as being 126–47 (with Republicans William Henry Koontz and Francis Thomas both being recorded as absent), the United States House Journal recorded the vote as being 128–47 (with Koontz and Thomas both being recorded present and voting in support of the resolution). The Office of the House Historian favors the Congressional Globe tally on its website, and, therefore, this article and others in Wikipedia also favor that tally.)
February 24, 1868	Party					Total votes
February 24, 1868	Democratic	Republican	Conservative	Conservative Republican	Independent Republican	Total votes
Yea	0	125	0	0	1	126
Nay	44	0	1	1	1	47

Comparative bar chart
Vote	Vote total
"Yea" votes	126
"Nay" votes	47
Absent/not voting	17

Votes by member
District	Member	Party	Vote
Kentucky 8	George Madison Adams	Democrat	Nay
Iowa 3	William B. Allison	Republican	Yea
Massachusetts 2	Oakes Ames	Republican	Yea
Missouri 9	George Washington Anderson	Republican	Yea
Maryland 2	Stevenson Archer	Democrat	Nay
Tennessee 6	Samuel Mayes Arnell	Republican	Yea
Nevada at-large	Delos R. Ashley	Republican	Yea
Ohio 10	James Mitchell Ashley	Republican	Yea
California 1	Samuel Beach Axtell	Democrat	Nay
New York 21	Alexander H. Bailey	Republican	Yea
Illinois 12	Jehu Baker	Republican	Yea
Massachusetts 8	John Denison Baldwin	Republican	Yea
Massachusetts 6	Nathaniel P. Banks	Republican	Yea
New York 2	Demas Barnes	Democrat	Nay
Connecticut 4	William Henry Barnum	Democrat	Nay
Michigan 1	Fernando C. Beaman	Republican	Yea
Ohio 8	John Beatty	Republican	Yea
Kentucky 7	James B. Beck	Democrat	Nay
Missouri 8	John F. Benjamin	Republican	Absent
New Hampshire 3	Jacob Benton	Republican	Yea
Ohio 16	John Bingham	Republican	Yea
Maine 3	James G. Blaine	Republican	Yea
Michigan 3	Austin Blair	Republican	Yea
Massachusetts 7	George S. Boutwell	Republican	Yea
Pennsylvania 6	Benjamin Markley Boyer	Democrat	Nay
Illinois 7	Henry P. H. Bromwell	Republican	Yea
New York 8	James Brooks	Democrat	Nay
Pennsylvania 7	John Martin Broomall	Republican	Yea
Ohio 9	Ralph Pomeroy Buckland	Republican	Yea
Illinois 10	Albert G. Burr	Democrat	Nay
Massachusetts 5	Benjamin Butler	Republican	Yea
Pennsylvania 10	Henry L. Cake	Republican	Yea
Ohio 2	Samuel Fenton Cary	Independent Republican	Nay
New York 7	John Winthrop Chanler	Democrat	Nay
New York 22	John C. Churchill	Republican	Yea
Ohio 6	Reader W. Clarke	Republican	Yea
Kansas at-large	Sidney Clarke	Republican	Yea
Wisconsin 3	Amasa Cobb	Republican	Yea
Indiana 6	John Coburn	Republican	Yea
Indiana 9	Schuyler Colfax	Republican	Did not vote (speaker)^{α}
Illinois 6	Burton C. Cook	Republican	Yea
New York 13	Thomas Cornell	Republican	Yea
Pennsylvania 21	John Covode	Republican	Yea
Illinois 8	Shelby Moore Cullom	Republican	Yea
Massachusetts 10	Henry L. Dawes	Republican	Yea
Rhode Island 2	Nathan F. Dixon II	Republican	Absent
Iowa 5	Grenville M. Dodge	Republican	Yea
Minnesota 2	Ignatius L. Donnelly	Republican	Absent
Michigan 6	John F. Driggs	Republican	Yea
Ohio 17	Ephraim R. Eckley	Republican	Yea
Ohio 1	Benjamin Eggleston	Republican	Yea
New Hampshire 1	Jacob Hart Ela	Republican	Absent
Wisconsin 4	Charles A. Eldredge	Democrat	Nay
Massachusetts 1	Thomas D. Eliot	Republican	Yea
Illinois 2	John F. Farnsworth	Republican	Yea
New York 16	Orange Ferriss	Republican	Yea
Michigan 4	Thomas W. Ferry	Republican	Yea
New York 19	William C. Fields	Republican	Yea
Pennsylvania 20	Darwin Abel Finney	Republican	Absent
New York 4	John Fox	Democrat	Nay
Ohio 19	James A. Garfield	Republican	Absent
Pennsylvania 8	James Lawrence Getz	Democrat	Nay
Pennsylvania 15	Adam John Glossbrenner	Democrat	Nay
Kentucky 3	Jacob Golladay	Democrat	Nay
Missouri 4	Joseph J. Gravely	Republican	Yea
New York 15	John Augustus Griswold	Republican	Yea
Kentucky 5	Asa Grover	Democrat	Nay
New Jersey 2	Charles Haight	Democrat	Nay
New Jersey 5	George A. Halsey	Republican	Yea
Illinois 4	Abner C. Harding	Republican	Yea
Tennessee 7	Isaac Roberts Hawkins	Republican	Absent
California 2	William Higby	Republican	Yea
New Jersey 4	John Hill	Republican	Yea
Indiana 4	William S. Holman	Democrat	Nay
Massachusetts 4	Samuel Hooper	Republican	Yea
Wisconsin 2	Benjamin F. Hopkins	Republican	Yea
Connecticut 2	Julius Hotchkiss	Democrat	Nay
Iowa 6	Asahel W. Hubbard	Republican	Yea
West Virginia 1	Chester D. Hubbard	Republican	Yea
Connecticut 1	Richard D. Hubbard	Democrat	Nay
New York 17	Calvin T. Hulburd	Republican	Yea
New York 30	James M. Humphrey	Democrat	Nay
Indiana 3	Morton C. Hunter	Republican	Yea
Illinois 5	Ebon C. Ingersoll	Republican	Yea
Rhode Island 1	Thomas Jenckes	Republican	Yea
California 3	James A. Johnson	Democrat	Nay
Kentucky 6	Thomas Laurens Jones	Democrat	Nay
Illinois 1	Norman B. Judd	Republican	Yea
Indiana 5	George Washington Julian	Republican	Yea
Pennsylvania 4	William D. Kelley	Republican	Yea
New York 25	William H. Kelsey	Republican	Yea
Indiana 2	Michael C. Kerr	Democrat	Nay
New York 12	John H. Ketcham	Republican	Yea
West Virginia 2	Bethuel Kitchen	Republican	Yea
Kentucky 4	J. Proctor Knott	Democrat	Nay
Pennsylvania 16	William Henry Koontz	Republican	Absent
New York 20	Addison H. Laflin	Republican	Yea
Pennsylvania 24	George Van Eman Lawrence	Republican	Yea
Ohio 4	William Lawrence	Republican	Yea
Missouri 7	Benjamin F. Loan	Republican	Yea
New York 26	William S. Lincoln	Republican	Yea
Illinois at-large	John A. Logan	Republican	Yea
Iowa 4	William Loughridge	Republican	Yea
Maine 1	John Lynch	Republican	Yea
Oregon at-large	Rufus Mallory	Republican	Yea
Illinois 11	Samuel S. Marshall	Democrat	Nay
New York 18	James M. Marvin	Republican	Yea
Tennessee 2	Horace Maynard	Republican	Absent
New York 23	Dennis McCarthy	Republican	Yea
Missouri 5	Joseph W. McClurg	Republican	Yea
Missouri 3	James Robinson McCormick	Democrat	Nay
Maryland 1	Hiram McCullough	Democrat	Nay
Pennsylvania 13	Ulysses Mercur	Republican	Yea
Pennsylvania 14	George Funston Miller	Republican	Yea
New Jersey 1	William Moore	Republican	Yea
Pennsylvania 22	James K. Moorhead	Republican	Yea
Ohio 13	George W. Morgan	Democrat	Nay
Pennsylvania 17	Daniel Johnson Morrell	Republican	Yea
New York 5	John Morrissey	Democrat	Nay
Tennessee 4	James Mullins	Republican	Yea
Ohio 5	William Mungen	Democrat	Nay
Pennsylvania 3	Leonard Myers	Republican	Yea
Missouri 2	Carman A. Newcomb	Republican	Yea
Indiana 1	William E. Niblack	Democrat	Nay
Delaware at-large	John A. Nicholson	Democrat	Nay
Tennessee 8	David Alexander Nunn	Republican	Yea
Pennsylvania 2	Charles O'Neill	Republican	Yea
Indiana 8	Godlove Stein Orth	Republican	Yea
Wisconsin 1	Halbert E. Paine	Republican	Yea
Maine 2	Sidney Perham	Republican	Yea
Maine 4	John A. Peters	Republican	Yea
Maryland 3	Charles E. Phelps	Conservative	Nay
Maine 5	Frederick Augustus Pike	Republican	Yea
Missouri 1	William A. Pile	Republican	Yea
Ohio 15	Tobias A. Plants	Republican	Yea
Vermont 2	Luke P. Poland	Republican	Yea
West Virginia 3	Daniel Polsley	Republican	Yea
New York 24	Theodore M. Pomeroy	Republican	Absent
Iowa 2	Hiram Price	Republican	Yea
New York 14	John V. L. Pruyn	Democrat	Nay
Pennsylvania 1	Samuel J. Randall	Democrat	Nay
Illinois 13	Green Berry Raum	Republican	Yea
New York 10	William H. Robertson	Republican	Yea
New York 3	William Erigena Robinson	Democrat	Absent
Illinois 9	Lewis Winans Ross	Democrat	Nay
Wisconsin 5	Philetus Sawyer	Republican	Yea
Ohio 3	Robert C. Schenck	Republican	Yea
Pennsylvania 19	Glenni William Scofield	Republican	Yea
New York 28	Lewis Selye	Independent Republican	Yea
Indiana 11	John P. C. Shanks	Republican	Yea
Ohio 7	Samuel Shellabarger	Republican	Yea
New Jersey 3	Charles Sitgreaves	Democrat	Nay
Vermont 3	Worthington Curtis Smith	Republican	Yea
Ohio 18	Rufus P. Spalding	Republican	Yea
Connecticut 3	Henry H. Starkweather	Republican	Yea
New Hampshire 2	Aaron Fletcher Stevens	Republican	Yea
Pennsylvania 9	Thaddeus Stevens	Republican	Yea
New York 6	Thomas E. Stewart	Conservative Republican	Nay
Tennessee 3	William Brickly Stokes	Republican	Yea
Maryland 5	Frederick Stone	Democrat	Nay
New York 1	Stephen Taber	Democrat	Nay
Nebraska at-large	John Taffe	Republican	Yea
Pennsylvania 5	Caleb Newbold Taylor	Republican	Yea
Maryland 4	Francis Thomas	Republican	Absent
Tennessee 5	John Trimble	Republican	Absent
Kentucky 1	Lawrence S. Trimble	Democrat	Nay
Michigan 5	Rowland E. Trowbridge	Republican	Yea
Massachusetts 3	Ginery Twichell	Republican	Yea
Michigan 2	Charles Upson	Republican	Yea
New York 31	Henry Van Aernam	Republican	Yea
Pennsylvania 11	Daniel Myers Van Auken	Democrat	Nay
New York 29	Burt Van Horn	Republican	Yea
Missouri 6	Robert T. Van Horn	Republican	Absent
Ohio 12	Philadelph Van Trump	Democrat	Nay
New York 11	Charles Van Wyck	Republican	Yea
New York 27	Hamilton Ward	Republican	Yea
Wisconsin 6	Cadwallader C. Washburn	Republican	Yea
Indiana 7	Henry D. Washburn	Republican	Absent
Massachusetts 9	William B. Washburn	Republican	Yea
Illinois 3	Elihu B. Washburne	Republican	Yea
Ohio 14	Martin Welker	Republican	Yea
Pennsylvania 23	Thomas Williams	Republican	Yea
Indiana 10	William Williams	Republican	Absent
Iowa 1	James F. Wilson	Republican	Yea
Ohio 11	John Thomas Wilson	Republican	Yea
Pennsylvania 18	Stephen Fowler Wilson	Republican	Yea
Minnesota 1	William Windom	Republican	Yea
New York 9	Fernando Wood	Democrat	Nay
Vermont 1	Frederick E. Woodbridge	Republican	Yea
Pennsylvania 12	George Washington Woodward	Democrat	Nay
Notes:^α Schuyler Colfax was serving as Speaker of the House. Per House rules, "the Speaker is not required to vote in ordinary legislative proceedings, except when such vote would be decisive or when the House is engaged in voting by ballot."

== Adoption of the articles of impeachment ==
After the House passed the impeachment resolution, its attention turned to the adoption of articles of impeachment which the Senate would try Johnson on. The approach of having the vote to impeach be an entirely separate vote from the adoption of article(s) of impeachment differs from the approach that has been practiced in more recent United States federal impeachments, in which impeachment has occurred directly through the adoption of article(s) of impeachment. However, the manner in which Johnson was impeached appears to have been the standard order of procedure for nineteenth century federal impeachments in the United States, as each of the five previous impeachments of federal officials that had led to a Senate trial had been conducted the same way, with votes to impeach occurring before votes on articles of impeachment.

=== Drafting of the articles ===
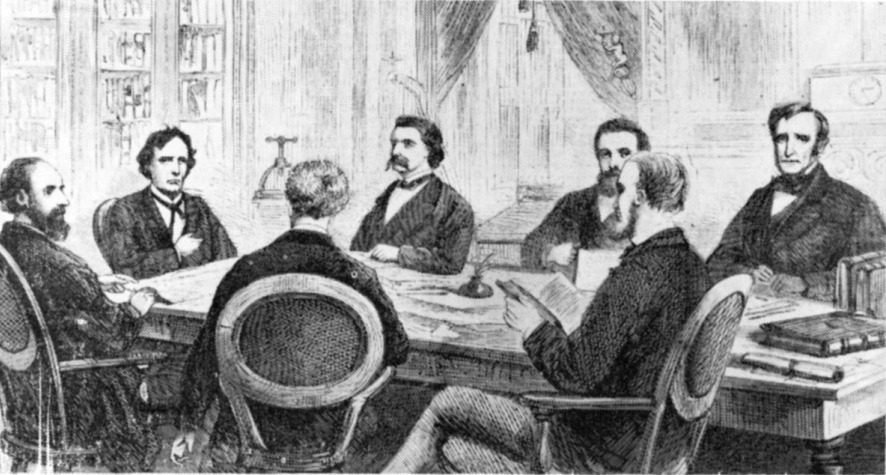
Illustration of the seven-member committee meeting to draft the articles of impeachment. From left to right: Thaddeus Stevens, James F. Wilson, Hamilton Ward (back of head), John A. Logan, George S. Boutwell, George Washington Julian, John Bingham

After the vote to impeach, Stevens submitted a pair of resolutions that both created a two-person committee tasked with presenting to the Senate bar the impeachment resolution that had been passed and informing the Senate that the House would "in due time" exhibit specific articles of impeachment, and which also created a seven-person committee to prepare and report articles of impeachment. The resolutions gave that seven-person committee the power to subpoena people, papers, and records, and to record sworn testimony. After procedural votes, the House approved both of Stevens' resolutions in a single 124–42 vote. No members of the Republican Party voted against it, while no members of the Democratic Party voted for it. Before the House adjourned for the evening, Speaker Schuyler Colfax appointed John Bingham and Thaddeus Stevens to the two-person committee tasked with informing the Senate of Johnson's impeachment, and also appointed John Bingham, George S. Boutwell, and Thaddeus Stevens (all of whom had been members of the Select Committee on Reconstruction) along with George Washington Julian, House Committee on the Judiciary Chairman James F. Wilson, John A. Logan, and Hamilton Ward to the seven-person committee tasked with writing the articles of impeachment.

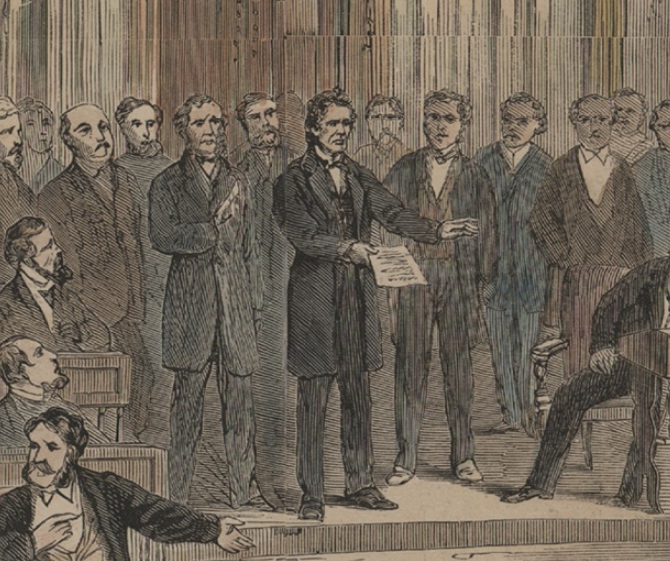
Illustration of Thaddeus Stevens and John Bingham notifying the Senate bar of the impeachment on February 25, 1868

On the morning of February 25, 1868, the Senate was informed by the two-person committee of Bingham and Stevens that Johnson had been impeached and that articles of impeachment would be created. Later that day, Stevens reported to the House that the committee had gone before the bar of the Senate on behalf of the House. Later on February 25, Ellihu B. Washburne moved to suspend the rules and order that, once the special committee tasked with preparing the articles of impeachment reported those articles, the House would immediately hold a full-house vote on the articles, and set the rules for speeches and debate on the articles. The House voted 106–37 to approve Washburne's motion. Later that day, George S. Boutwell presented two resolutions to enable the committee of seven that had been appointed to prepare and report the articles of impeachment to sit during sessions of the House. These resolutions were passed 105–36.

Thaddeus Stevens felt that Radical Republicans on the committee were yielding too much to moderates to limit the scope of the violations of law that the articles of impeachment would charge Johnson with. He wrote Benjamin F. Butler, proposing that, while Stevens worked to add two more additional articles to the seven already written by the committee, Butler would write his own separate article of impeachment from outside of the committee. Butler accepted this proposal.

The committee of seven initially delivered ten proposed articles of impeachment to the House on February 29, 1868. These would be revised and reduced to nine articles before being voted on on March 2.

=== Votes on the articles ===
One week after it voted to impeach Johnson, the House adopted eleven articles of impeachment against the president. The first nine articles were approved on March 2, while the last two were approved on March 3, 1868. The third and fourth articles each received a single Democratic vote in support of them (George W. Morgan for the third and Charles Haight for the fourth article). The tenth article was the only to have Republican opposition, with twelve Republicans casting votes against it. However, two other members of the Republican caucus that were not formally part of the Republican Party (Samuel Fenton Cary, an independent Republican from Ohio, and Thomas E. Stewart, a "Conservative Republican" from New York) voted against nearly every article of impeachment (with Stewart having been absent from the vote on the fourth article).

Votes by member
District	Member	Party	Votes on articles										
District	Member	Party	1st	2nd	3rd	4th	5th	6th	7th	8th	9th	10th	11th
Kentucky 8	George Madison Adams	Democrat	Nay	Nay	Nay	Nay	Nay	Nay	Nay	Nay	Nay	Nay	Nay
Iowa 3	William B. Allison	Republican	Yea	Yea	Yea	Yea	Yea	Yea	Yea	Yea	Yea	Yea	Yea
Massachusetts 2	Oakes Ames	Republican	Yea	Yea	Yea	Yea	Yea	Yea	Yea	Yea	Yea	Yea	Yea
Missouri 9	George Washington Anderson	Republican	Yea	Yea	Yea	Yea	Yea	Yea	Yea	Yea	Absent	Absent	Absent
Maryland 2	Stevenson Archer	Democrat	Nay	Nay	Nay	Nay	Nay	Nay	Nay	Nay	Nay	Nay	Nay
Tennessee 6	Samuel Mayes Arnell	Republican	Yea	Yea	Yea	Yea	Yea	Yea	Yea	Yea	Yea	Absent	Absent
Nevada at-large	Delos R. Ashley	Republican	Yea	Yea	Yea	Yea	Yea	Yea	Yea	Yea	Yea	Nay	Yea
Ohio 10	James Mitchell Ashley	Republican	Yea	Yea	Yea	Yea	Yea	Yea	Yea	Yea	Yea	Yea	Yea
California 1	Samuel Beach Axtell	Democrat	Nay	Nay	Nay	Nay	Nay	Nay	Nay	Nay	Nay	Absent	Absent
New York 21	Alexander H. Bailey	Republican	Yea	Yea	Yea	Yea	Yea	Yea	Yea	Yea	Yea	Absent	Absent
Illinois 12	Jehu Baker	Republican	Absent	Absent	Absent	Absent	Absent	Absent	Absent	Absent	Absent	Absent	Absent
Massachusetts 8	John Denison Baldwin	Republican	Yea	Yea	Yea	Yea	Yea	Yea	Yea	Yea	Absent	Yea	Yea
Massachusetts 6	Nathaniel P. Banks	Republican	Yea	Yea	Yea	Yea	Yea	Yea	Yea	Yea	Absent	Yea	Yea
New York 2	Demas Barnes	Democrat	Absent	Absent	Absent	Absent	Absent	Absent	Absent	Absent	Absent	Absent	Absent
Connecticut 4	William Henry Barnum	Democrat	Nay	Nay	Nay	Nay	Nay	Nay	Nay	Nay	Nay	Nay	Nay
Michigan 1	Fernando C. Beaman	Republican	Yea	Yea	Yea	Yea	Yea	Yea	Yea	Yea	Yea	Yea	Yea
Ohio 8	John Beatty	Republican	Yea	Yea	Yea	Yea	Yea	Yea	Yea	Yea	Yea	Yea	Yea
Kentucky 7	James B. Beck	Democrat	Nay	Nay	Nay	Nay	Nay	Nay	Nay	Nay	Nay	Nay	Nay
Missouri 8	John F. Benjamin	Republican	Absent	Absent	Absent	Absent	Absent	Absent	Absent	Absent	Absent	Absent	Absent
New Hampshire 3	Jacob Benton	Republican	Yea	Yea	Yea	Yea	Yea	Yea	Yea	Yea	Yea	Absent	Absent
Ohio 16	John Bingham	Republican	Yea	Yea	Yea	Yea	Yea	Yea	Yea	Yea	Yea	Yea	Yea
Maine 3	James G. Blaine	Republican	Yea	Yea	Yea	Yea	Yea	Yea	Yea	Yea	Absent	Yea	Yea
Michigan 3	Austin Blair	Republican	Yea	Yea	Yea	Yea	Yea	Yea	Yea	Yea	Yea	Yea	Yea
Massachusetts 7	George S. Boutwell	Republican	Yea	Yea	Yea	Yea	Yea	Yea	Yea	Yea	Yea	Yea	Yea
Pennsylvania 6	Benjamin Markley Boyer	Democrat	Nay	Nay	Nay	Nay	Nay	Nay	Nay	Nay	Nay	Absent	Absent
Illinois 7	Henry P. H. Bromwell	Republican	Yea	Yea	Yea	Yea	Yea	Yea	Yea	Yea	Yea	Absent	Absent
New York 8	James Brooks	Democrat	Nay	Nay	Nay	Nay	Nay	Nay	Nay	Nay	Nay	Nay	Nay
Pennsylvania 7	John Martin Broomall	Republican	Yea	Yea	Yea	Yea	Yea	Yea	Yea	Yea	Yea	Yea	Yea
Ohio 9	Ralph Pomeroy Buckland	Republican	Yea	Yea	Yea	Yea	Yea	Yea	Yea	Yea	Yea	Absent	Absent
Illinois 10	Albert G. Burr	Democrat	Nay	Nay	Nay	Nay	Nay	Nay	Nay	Nay	Absent	Nay	Nay
Massachusetts 5	Benjamin Butler	Republican	Yea	Yea	Yea	Absent	Yea	Yea	Yea	Yea	Yea	Yea	Yea
Pennsylvania 10	Henry L. Cake	Republican	Yea	Yea	Yea	Yea	Yea	Yea	Yea	Yea	Yea	Yea	Yea
Ohio 2	Samuel Fenton Cary	Independent Republican	Nay	Nay	Nay	Nay	Nay	Nay	Nay	Nay	Nay	Nay	Nay
New York 7	John Winthrop Chanler	Democrat	Nay	Nay	Nay	Nay	Nay	Nay	Nay	Nay	Nay	Absent	Absent
New York 22	John C. Churchill	Republican	Yea	Yea	Yea	Yea	Yea	Yea	Yea	Yea	Yea	Yea	Yea
Ohio 6	Reader W. Clarke	Republican	Yea	Yea	Yea	Yea	Yea	Yea	Yea	Yea	Absent	Yea	Yea
Kansas at-large	Sidney Clarke	Republican	Yea	Yea	Yea	Yea	Yea	Yea	Yea	Yea	Yea	Yea	Yea
Wisconsin 3	Amasa Cobb	Republican	Yea	Yea	Yea	Yea	Yea	Yea	Yea	Yea	Yea	Yea	Yea
Indiana 6	John Coburn	Republican	Yea	Yea	Yea	Yea	Yea	Yea	Yea	Yea	Yea	Nay	Yea
Indiana 9	Schuyler Colfax	Republican	Did not vote (speaker)^{α}										
Illinois 6	Burton C. Cook	Republican	Yea	Yea	Yea	Yea	Yea	Yea	Yea	Yea	Yea	Yea	Yea
New York 13	Thomas Cornell	Republican	Yea	Yea	Yea	Yea	Yea	Yea	Yea	Yea	Yea	Absent	Yea
Pennsylvania 21	John Covode	Republican	Yea	Absent	Yea	Yea	Yea	Yea	Yea	Yea	Yea	Absent	Absent
Illinois 8	Shelby Moore Cullom	Republican	Yea	Yea	Yea	Yea	Yea	Yea	Yea	Yea	Yea	Yea	Yea
Massachusetts 10	Henry L. Dawes	Republican	Yea	Yea	Yea	Yea	Yea	Yea	Yea	Yea	Yea	Absent	Absent
Rhode Island 2	Nathan F. Dixon II	Republican	Yea	Yea	Yea	Yea	Yea	Yea	Yea	Yea	Yea	Absent	Yea
Iowa 5	Grenville M. Dodge	Republican	Yea	Yea	Yea	Yea	Yea	Yea	Yea	Yea	Yea	Absent	Absent
Minnesota 2	Ignatius L. Donnelly	Republican	Yea	Yea	Yea	Yea	Yea	Yea	Yea	Yea	Yea	Yea	Yea
Michigan 6	John F. Driggs	Republican	Yea	Yea	Yea	Yea	Yea	Yea	Yea	Yea	Yea	Yea	Yea
Ohio 17	Ephraim R. Eckley	Republican	Absent	Absent	Absent	Absent	Absent	Absent	Absent	Absent	Absent	Absent	Absent
Ohio 1	Benjamin Eggleston	Republican	Yea	Yea	Yea	Yea	Yea	Yea	Yea	Yea	Yea	Yea	Yea
New Hampshire 1	Jacob Hart Ela	Republican	Absent	Absent	Absent	Absent	Absent	Absent	Absent	Absent	Absent	Absent	Absent
Wisconsin 4	Charles A. Eldredge	Democrat	Nay	Nay	Nay	Nay	Nay	Nay	Nay	Nay	Nay	Nay	Absent
Massachusetts 1	Thomas D. Eliot	Republican	Yea	Yea	Yea	Yea	Yea	Yea	Yea	Yea	Yea	Yea	Yea
Illinois 2	John F. Farnsworth	Republican	Yea	Yea	Yea	Yea	Yea	Yea	Yea	Yea	Absent	Yea	Yea
New York 16	Orange Ferriss	Republican	Yea	Yea	Yea	Yea	Yea	Yea	Yea	Yea	Yea	Yea	Yea
Michigan 4	Thomas W. Ferry	Republican	Yea	Yea	Yea	Yea	Yea	Yea	Yea	Yea	Yea	Yea	Yea
New York 19	William C. Fields	Republican	Yea	Yea	Yea	Yea	Yea	Yea	Yea	Yea	Yea	Absent	Absent
Pennsylvania 20	Darwin Abel Finney	Republican	Absent	Absent	Absent	Absent	Absent	Absent	Absent	Absent	Absent	Absent	Absent
New York 4	John Fox	Democrat	Nay	Nay	Nay	Nay	Nay	Nay	Nay	Nay	Nay	Absent	Absent
Ohio 19	James A. Garfield	Republican	Yea	Yea	Yea	Yea	Yea	Yea	Yea	Yea	Yea	Yea	Yea
Pennsylvania 8	James Lawrence Getz	Democrat	Nay	Nay	Nay	Nay	Nay	Nay	Nay	Nay	Nay	Absent	Nay
Pennsylvania 15	Adam John Glossbrenner	Democrat	Nay	Nay	Nay	Nay	Nay	Nay	Nay	Nay	Nay	Absent	Absent
Kentucky 3	Jacob Golladay	Democrat	Nay	Nay	Nay	Nay	Nay	Nay	Nay	Nay	Nay	Nay	Nay
Missouri 4	Joseph J. Gravely	Republican	Yea	Yea	Yea	Yea	Yea	Yea	Yea	Yea	Yea	Yea	Yea
New York 15	John Augustus Griswold	Republican	Yea	Yea	Yea	Yea	Yea	Yea	Yea	Yea	Absent	Nay	Yea
Kentucky 5	Asa Grover	Democrat	Nay	Nay	Nay	Nay	Nay	Nay	Nay	Nay	Nay	Nay	Nay
New Jersey 2	Charles Haight	Democrat	Nay	Nay	Nay	Yea	Nay	Nay	Nay	Nay	Nay	Nay	Nay
New Jersey 5	George A. Halsey	Republican	Yea	Yea	Yea	Yea	Yea	Yea	Yea	Yea	Yea	Yea	Yea
Illinois 4	Abner C. Harding	Republican	Yea	Yea	Yea	Yea	Yea	Yea	Yea	Yea	Yea	Yea	Yea
Tennessee 7	Isaac Roberts Hawkins	Republican	Absent	Absent	Absent	Absent	Absent	Absent	Absent	Absent	Absent	Absent	Absent
California 2	William Higby	Republican	Yea	Yea	Yea	Absent	Yea	Yea	Yea	Yea	Absent	Yea	Yea
New Jersey 4	John Hill	Republican	Yea	Yea	Yea	Yea	Yea	Yea	Yea	Yea	Yea	Yea	Yea
Indiana 4	William S. Holman	Democrat	Nay	Nay	Nay	Nay	Nay	Nay	Nay	Nay	Nay	Nay	Nay
Massachusetts 4	Samuel Hooper	Republican	Yea	Yea	Yea	Yea	Yea	Yea	Yea	Yea	Yea	Yea	Yea
Wisconsin 2	Benjamin F. Hopkins	Republican	Yea	Yea	Yea	Yea	Yea	Yea	Yea	Yea	Yea	Yea	Yea
Connecticut 2	Julius Hotchkiss	Democrat	Nay	Nay	Nay	Nay	Nay	Nay	Nay	Nay	Nay	Nay	Nay
Iowa 6	Asahel W. Hubbard	Republican	Absent	Absent	Absent	Absent	Absent	Absent	Absent	Absent	Absent	Absent	Absent
West Virginia 1	Chester D. Hubbard	Republican	Yea	Yea	Yea	Yea	Yea	Yea	Yea	Yea	Yea	Yea	Yea
Connecticut 1	Richard D. Hubbard	Democrat	Absent	Absent	Nay	Nay	Absent	Absent	Absent	Absent	Nay	Absent	Absent
New York 17	Calvin T. Hulburd	Republican	Yea	Yea	Yea	Yea	Yea	Yea	Yea	Yea	Yea	Yea	Yea
New York 30	James M. Humphrey	Democrat	Nay	Nay	Nay	Absent	Nay	Nay	Nay	Nay	Nay	Nay	Nay
Indiana 3	Morton C. Hunter	Republican	Yea	Yea	Yea	Yea	Yea	Yea	Yea	Yea	Yea	Yea	Yea
Illinois 5	Ebon C. Ingersoll	Republican	Yea	Yea	Yea	Yea	Yea	Yea	Yea	Yea	Yea	Yea	Yea
Rhode Island 1	Thomas Jenckes	Republican	Yea	Yea	Yea	Yea	Yea	Yea	Yea	Yea	Yea	Absent	Yea
California 3	James A. Johnson	Democrat	Nay	Nay	Nay	Nay	Nay	Nay	Nay	Nay	Nay	Nay	Nay
Kentucky 6	Thomas Laurens Jones	Democrat	Nay	Nay	Nay	Nay	Nay	Nay	Nay	Nay	Nay	Nay	Nay
Illinois 1	Norman B. Judd	Republican	Yea	Yea	Yea	Yea	Yea	Yea	Yea	Yea	Yea	Yea	Yea
Indiana 5	George Washington Julian	Republican	Yea	Yea	Yea	Yea	Yea	Yea	Yea	Yea	Yea	Yea	Yea
Pennsylvania 4	William D. Kelley	Republican	Yea	Yea	Yea	Yea	Yea	Yea	Yea	Yea	Yea	Yea	Yea
New York 25	William H. Kelsey	Republican	Yea	Yea	Yea	Yea	Yea	Yea	Yea	Yea	Yea	Yea	Yea
Indiana 2	Michael C. Kerr	Democrat	Nay	Absent	Nay	Nay	Nay	Nay	Nay	Nay	Nay	Nay	Nay
New York 12	John H. Ketcham	Republican	Yea	Yea	Yea	Yea	Yea	Yea	Yea	Yea	Yea	Absent	Yea
West Virginia 2	Bethuel Kitchen	Republican	Yea	Yea	Yea	Yea	Yea	Yea	Yea	Yea	Absent	Yea	Yea
Kentucky 4	J. Proctor Knott	Democrat	Nay	Nay	Nay	Nay	Nay	Nay	Nay	Nay	Nay	Nay	Nay
Pennsylvania 16	William Henry Koontz	Republican	Yea	Yea	Yea	Yea	Yea	Yea	Yea	Yea	Yea	Yea	Yea
New York 20	Addison H. Laflin	Republican	Yea	Yea	Yea	Yea	Yea	Yea	Yea	Yea	Yea	Nay	Yea
Pennsylvania 24	George Van Eman Lawrence	Republican	Yea	Yea	Yea	Yea	Yea	Yea	Yea	Yea	Yea	Yea	Yea
Ohio 4	William Lawrence	Republican	Yea	Yea	Yea	Yea	Yea	Yea	Yea	Yea	Yea	Yea	Yea
Missouri 7	Benjamin F. Loan	Republican	Yea	Yea	Yea	Yea	Yea	Yea	Yea	Yea	Yea	Yea	Yea
New York 26	William S. Lincoln	Republican	Yea	Yea	Yea	Yea	Yea	Yea	Yea	Yea	Yea	Yea	Yea
Illinois at-large	John A. Logan	Republican	Yea	Yea	Yea	Yea	Yea	Yea	Yea	Yea	Yea	Yea	Yea
Iowa 4	William Loughridge	Republican	Yea	Absent	Yea	Absent	Yea	Yea	Yea	Yea	Absent	Yea	Yea
Maine 1	John Lynch	Republican	Yea	Yea	Yea	Yea	Yea	Yea	Yea	Yea	Yea	Yea	Yea
Oregon at-large	Rufus Mallory	Republican	Yea	Yea	Yea	Yea	Yea	Yea	Yea	Yea	Yea	Nay	Yea
Illinois 11	Samuel S. Marshall	Democrat	Nay	Nay	Nay	Nay	Nay	Nay	Nay	Nay	Nay	Nay	Nay
New York 18	James M. Marvin	Republican	Yea	Yea	Yea	Yea	Yea	Yea	Yea	Yea	Yea	Nay	Yea
Tennessee 2	Horace Maynard	Republican	Yea	Yea	Yea	Yea	Yea	Yea	Yea	Yea	Yea	Yea	Yea
New York 23	Dennis McCarthy	Republican	Yea	Yea	Yea	Yea	Yea	Yea	Yea	Yea	Yea	Yea	Yea
Missouri 5	Joseph W. McClurg	Republican	Yea	Yea	Yea	Yea	Yea	Yea	Yea	Yea	Yea	Yea	Yea
Missouri 3	James Robinson McCormick	Democrat	Nay	Nay	Nay	Nay	Nay	Nay	Nay	Nay	Nay	Nay	Nay
Maryland 1	Hiram McCullough	Democrat	Absent	Absent	Absent	Absent	Absent	Absent	Absent	Absent	Absent	Absent	Absent
Pennsylvania 13	Ulysses Mercur	Republican	Yea	Yea	Yea	Yea	Yea	Yea	Yea	Yea	Yea	Yea	Yea
Pennsylvania 14	George Funston Miller	Republican	Yea	Yea	Yea	Yea	Yea	Yea	Yea	Yea	Yea	Yea	Yea
New Jersey 1	William Moore	Republican	Yea	Yea	Yea	Yea	Yea	Yea	Yea	Yea	Yea	Yea	Yea
Pennsylvania 22	James K. Moorhead	Republican	Absent	Absent	Absent	Absent	Absent	Absent	Absent	Absent	Absent	Absent	Absent
Ohio 13	George W. Morgan	Democrat	Nay	Nay	Yea	Nay	Nay	Nay	Nay	Nay	Nay	Nay	Nay
Pennsylvania 17	Daniel Johnson Morrell	Republican	Yea	Yea	Yea	Yea	Yea	Yea	Yea	Yea	Yea	Yea	Yea
New York 5	John Morrissey	Democrat	Absent	Absent	Absent	Absent	Absent	Absent	Absent	Absent	Absent	Absent	Absent
Tennessee 4	James Mullins	Republican	Yea	Absent	Yea	Yea	Yea	Yea	Yea	Yea	Yea	Absent	Absent
Ohio 5	William Mungen	Democrat	Nay	Nay	Absent	Nay	Nay	Nay	Nay	Nay	Nay	Nay	Nay
Pennsylvania 3	Leonard Myers	Republican	Yea	Yea	Yea	Yea	Yea	Yea	Yea	Yea	Yea	Yea	Yea
Missouri 2	Carman A. Newcomb	Republican	Yea	Yea	Yea	Absent	Yea	Yea	Yea	Yea	Yea	Yea	Yea
Indiana 1	William E. Niblack	Democrat	Nay	Nay	Nay	Nay	Nay	Nay	Nay	Nay	Nay	Nay	Nay
Delaware at-large	John A. Nicholson	Democrat	Nay	Nay	Nay	Nay	Nay	Nay	Nay	Nay	Absent	Nay	Nay
Tennessee 8	David Alexander Nunn	Republican	Yea	Yea	Yea	Yea	Yea	Yea	Yea	Yea	Yea	Absent	Absent
Pennsylvania 2	Charles O'Neill	Republican	Yea	Yea	Yea	Yea	Yea	Yea	Yea	Yea	Yea	Yea	Yea
Indiana 8	Godlove Stein Orth	Republican	Yea	Yea	Yea	Yea	Yea	Yea	Yea	Yea	Yea	Yea	Yea
Wisconsin 1	Halbert E. Paine	Republican	Yea	Yea	Yea	Yea	Yea	Yea	Yea	Yea	Yea	Absent	Yea
Maine 2	Sidney Perham	Republican	Yea	Yea	Yea	Yea	Yea	Yea	Yea	Yea	Yea	Yea	Yea
Maine 4	John A. Peters	Republican	Yea	Yea	Yea	Yea	Yea	Yea	Yea	Yea	Yea	Absent	Absent
Maryland 3	Charles E. Phelps	Conservative	Absent	Absent	Absent	Absent	Absent	Absent	Absent	Absent	Absent	Absent	Absent
Maine 5	Frederick Augustus Pike	Republican	Yea	Yea	Yea	Yea	Yea	Yea	Yea	Yea	Yea	Yea	Yea
Missouri 1	William A. Pile	Republican	Absent	Absent	Absent	Absent	Absent	Absent	Absent	Absent	Absent	Absent	Absent
Ohio 15	Tobias A. Plants	Republican	Yea	Yea	Yea	Yea	Yea	Yea	Yea	Yea	Absent	Absent	Yea
Vermont 2	Luke P. Poland	Republican	Yea	Yea	Yea	Absent	Yea	Yea	Yea	Yea	Absent	Absent	Yea
West Virginia 3	Daniel Polsley	Republican	Yea	Yea	Yea	Yea	Yea	Yea	Yea	Yea	Yea	Yea	Yea
New York 24	Theodore M. Pomeroy	Republican	Yea	Yea	Yea	Yea	Yea	Yea	Yea	Yea	Yea	Nay	Yea
Iowa 2	Hiram Price	Republican	Yea	Yea	Yea	Yea	Yea	Yea	Yea	Yea	Yea	Absent	Yea
New York 14	John V. L. Pruyn	Democrat	Nay	Nay	Nay	Nay	Nay	Nay	Nay	Nay	Nay	Nay	Nay
Pennsylvania 1	Samuel J. Randall	Democrat	Nay	Nay	Nay	Nay	Nay	Nay	Nay	Nay	Nay	Absent	Absent
Illinois 13	Green Berry Raum	Republican	Yea	Yea	Yea	Yea	Yea	Yea	Yea	Yea	Yea	Yea	Yea
New York 10	William H. Robertson	Republican	Yea	Yea	Yea	Yea	Yea	Yea	Yea	Yea	Yea	Absent	Yea
New York 3	William Erigena Robinson	Democrat	Absent	Absent	Absent	Absent	Absent	Absent	Absent	Absent	Absent	Absent	Absent
Illinois 9	Lewis Winans Ross	Democrat	Nay	Nay	Nay	Nay	Nay	Nay	Nay	Nay	Nay	Nay	Nay
Wisconsin 5	Philetus Sawyer	Republican	Yea	Yea	Yea	Yea	Yea	Yea	Yea	Yea	Yea	Yea	Yea
Ohio 3	Robert C. Schenck	Republican	Yea	Yea	Yea	Yea	Yea	Yea	Yea	Yea	Yea	Yea	Yea
Pennsylvania 19	Glenni William Scofield	Republican	Yea	Yea	Yea	Yea	Yea	Yea	Yea	Yea	Yea	Yea	Yea
New York 28	Lewis Selye	Independent Republican	Absent	Absent	Absent	Absent	Absent	Absent	Absent	Absent	Absent	Absent	Absent
Indiana 11	John P. C. Shanks	Republican	Yea	Yea	Yea	Yea	Yea	Yea	Yea	Yea	Yea	Yea	Yea
Ohio 7	Samuel Shellabarger	Republican	Absent	Absent	Absent	Absent	Absent	Absent	Absent	Absent	Absent	Absent	Absent
New Jersey 3	Charles Sitgreaves	Democrat	Nay	Nay	Nay	Nay	Nay	Nay	Nay	Nay	Nay	Nay	Nay
Vermont 3	Worthington Curtis Smith	Republican	Yea	Yea	Yea	Yea	Yea	Yea	Yea	Yea	Yea	Nay	Yea
Ohio 18	Rufus P. Spalding	Republican	Yea	Yea	Yea	Absent	Yea	Yea	Yea	Yea	Absent	Yea	Yea
Connecticut 3	Henry H. Starkweather	Republican	Yea	Yea	Yea	Yea	Yea	Yea	Yea	Yea	Yea	Yea	Yea
New Hampshire 2	Aaron Fletcher Stevens	Republican	Absent	Absent	Absent	Absent	Absent	Absent	Absent	Absent	Absent	Absent	Absent
Pennsylvania 9	Thaddeus Stevens	Republican	Yea	Yea	Absent	Absent	Yea	Yea	Yea	Yea	Yea	Yea	Yea
New York 6	Thomas E. Stewart	Conservative Republican	Nay	Nay	Nay	Absent	Nay	Nay	Nay	Nay	Nay	Nay	Nay
Tennessee 3	William Brickly Stokes	Republican	Yea	Yea	Absent	Absent	Yea	Yea	Yea	Yea	Absent	Absent	Absent
Maryland 5	Frederick Stone	Democrat	Nay	Nay	Nay	Nay	Nay	Nay	Nay	Nay	Nay	Absent	Absent
New York 1	Stephen Taber	Democrat	Nay	Nay	Nay	Nay	Nay	Nay	Nay	Nay	Nay	Nay	Nay
Nebraska at-large	John Taffe	Republican	Yea	Yea	Yea	Yea	Yea	Yea	Yea	Yea	Yea	Yea	Yea
Pennsylvania 5	Caleb Newbold Taylor	Republican	Yea	Yea	Yea	Yea	Yea	Yea	Yea	Yea	Yea	Yea	Yea
Maryland 4	Francis Thomas	Republican	Yea	Yea	Yea	Yea	Yea	Yea	Yea	Yea	Yea	Yea	Yea
Tennessee 5	John Trimble	Republican	Yea	Yea	Yea	Yea	Yea	Yea	Yea	Yea	Yea	Absent	Absent
Kentucky 1	Lawrence S. Trimble	Democrat	Nay	Nay	Nay	Nay	Nay	Nay	Nay	Nay	Nay	Nay	Nay
Michigan 5	Rowland E. Trowbridge	Republican	Yea	Yea	Yea	Yea	Yea	Yea	Yea	Yea	Yea	Yea	Yea
Massachusetts 3	Ginery Twichell	Republican	Yea	Yea	Yea	Yea	Yea	Yea	Yea	Yea	Yea	Yea	Yea
Michigan 2	Charles Upson	Republican	Yea	Yea	Yea	Yea	Yea	Yea	Yea	Yea	Yea	Yea	Yea
New York 31	Henry Van Aernam	Republican	Yea	Yea	Yea	Yea	Yea	Yea	Yea	Yea	Yea	Yea	Yea
Pennsylvania 11	Daniel Myers Van Auken	Democrat	Nay	Nay	Nay	Nay	Nay	Nay	Nay	Nay	Nay	Absent	Absent
New York 29	Burt Van Horn	Republican	Yea	Yea	Yea	Yea	Yea	Yea	Yea	Yea	Absent	Absent	Absent
Missouri 6	Robert T. Van Horn	Republican	Yea	Yea	Yea	Yea	Yea	Yea	Yea	Yea	Yea	Yea	Yea
Ohio 12	Philadelph Van Trump	Democrat	Nay	Nay	Nay	Nay	Nay	Nay	Nay	Nay	Nay	Nay	Nay
New York 11	Charles Van Wyck	Republican	Yea	Yea	Yea	Yea	Yea	Yea	Yea	Yea	Absent	Yea	Yea
New York 27	Hamilton Ward	Republican	Yea	Yea	Yea	Yea	Yea	Yea	Yea	Yea	Yea	Yea	Yea
Wisconsin 6	Cadwallader C. Washburn	Republican	Yea	Yea	Absent	Absent	Yea	Yea	Yea	Yea	Absent	Yea	Yea
Indiana 7	Henry D. Washburn	Republican	Absent	Absent	Absent	Absent	Absent	Absent	Absent	Absent	Absent	Absent	Absent
Massachusetts 9	William B. Washburn	Republican	Yea	Yea	Yea	Yea	Yea	Yea	Yea	Yea	Yea	Yea	Yea
Illinois 3	Elihu B. Washburne	Republican	Yea	Yea	Yea	Absent	Yea	Yea	Yea	Yea	Absent	Absent	Absent
Ohio 14	Martin Welker	Republican	Yea	Yea	Yea	Yea	Yea	Yea	Yea	Yea	Yea	Yea	Yea
Pennsylvania 23	Thomas Williams	Republican	Yea	Yea	Yea	Yea	Yea	Yea	Yea	Yea	Yea	Yea	Yea
Indiana 10	William Williams	Republican	Absent	Absent	Absent	Absent	Absent	Absent	Absent	Absent	Absent	Absent	Absent
Iowa 1	James F. Wilson	Republican	Yea	Yea	Yea	Yea	Yea	Yea	Yea	Yea	Yea	Nay	Yea
Ohio 11	John Thomas Wilson	Republican	Yea	Yea	Yea	Yea	Yea	Yea	Yea	Yea	Yea	Nay	Yea
Pennsylvania 18	Stephen Fowler Wilson	Republican	Yea	Yea	Yea	Yea	Yea	Yea	Yea	Yea	Yea	Absent	Absent
Minnesota 1	William Windom	Republican	Yea	Yea	Yea	Yea	Yea	Yea	Yea	Yea	Yea	Nay	Yea
New York 9	Fernando Wood	Democrat	Nay	Nay	Nay	Nay	Nay	Nay	Nay	Nay	Nay	Nay	Nay
Vermont 1	Frederick E. Woodbridge	Republican	Yea	Yea	Yea	Absent	Yea	Yea	Yea	Yea	Absent	Nay	Yea
Pennsylvania 12	George Washington Woodward	Democrat	Nay	Nay	Nay	Nay	Nay	Nay	Nay	Nay	Nay	Absent	Absent
Notes:^α Schuyler Colfax was serving as Speaker of the House. Per House rules, "the Speaker is not required to vote in ordinary legislative proceedings, except when such vote would be decisive or when the House is engaged in voting by ballot."

==== March 2, 1868 ====
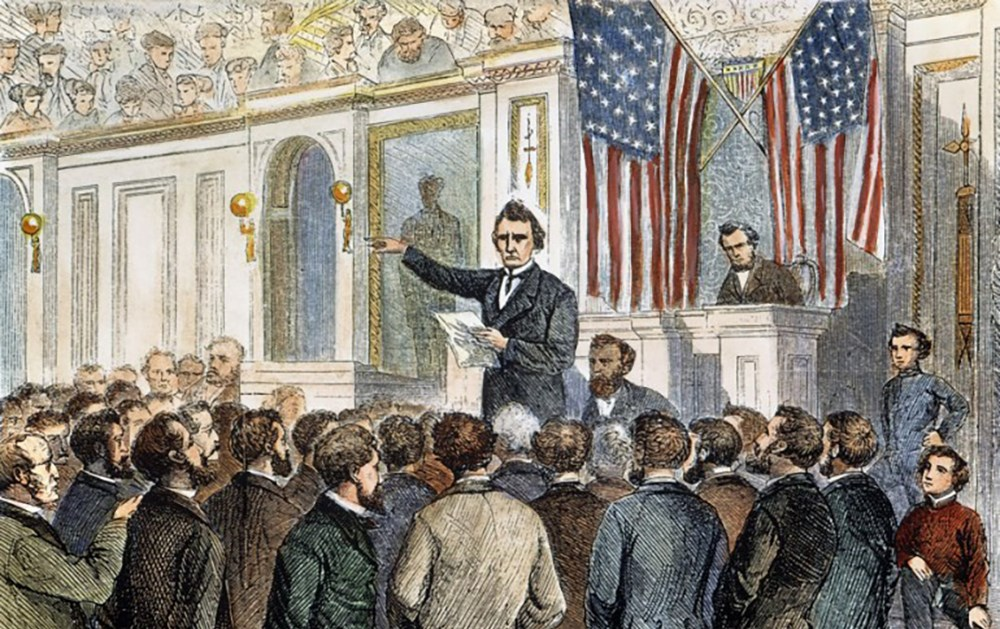
Illustration of Thaddeus Stevens speaking during March 2, 1868, debate

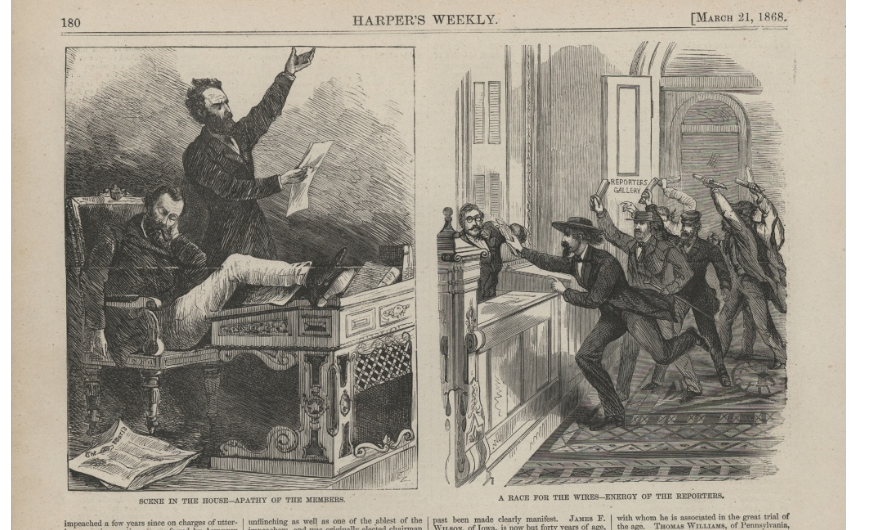
Set of illustrations. The illustration on the left depicts Democratic Congressman Albert G. Burr (left) sleeping while Republican Congressman John Winthrop Chanler delivers a loud speech during debate on the adoption of articles of impeachment. The image on right depicts reports rushing to the telegraph office as soon as the articles of impeachment were published.

The House debated the proposed articles on March 1 and 2, 1868. On March 2, the House voted to ratify the nine articles of impeachment referred to it by the committee of seven. These articles were "strictly legalistic" and molded on criminal indictment. Eight concerned the violation of the Tenure of Office Act, while the ninth accused him of violating the Command of Army Act by pressuring General William H. Emory to ignore Acting Secretary of War Grant and instead take orders directly from Johnson.

After a series of speeches during debate, Thaddeus Stevens took the floor to criticize the committee of seven for going too easy on Johnson, declaring,

Never was so great a malefactor so gently treated as Andrew Johnson. The people have been unwilling to blot the records of their country by mingling his crimes with their shame—shame for endurance for so long a time of his great crimes and misdemeanor.

Stevens argued that the articles put before the house had failed to address just how much Johnson had imperiled the governing structure of the United States.

After Stevens delivered his remarks, which closed out debate, Boutwell brought forward revised articles, with the number of articles proposed by the committee being decreased from ten to nine. Benjamin Butler then submitted his own lengthy impeachment article, inspired by Stevens' request to him. Butlers' proposed article stated no clear violation of law, but instead charged Johnson with attempting, "to bring into disgrace, ridicule, hatred, contempt, and reproach the Congress of the United States." The article was written in response to speeches that Johnson had made during his "Swing Around the Circle". Butler's remarks on his impeachment resolution were very long, and this frustrated many, even including Stevens. The House quickly rejected Butler's article before approving all nine articles from the committee one by one.

March 2, 1868, vote totals
Article introduced by Benjamin Butler	Party					Total votes
Article introduced by Benjamin Butler	Democratic	Republican	Conservative	Conservative Republican	Independent Republican	Total votes
Yea	Detailed roll call not reported by the Congressional Globe					48
Nay	Detailed roll call not reported by the Congressional Globe					74
First article	Party					Total votes
First article	Democratic	Republican	Conservative	Conservative Republican	Independent Republican	Total votes
Yea	0	127	0	0	0	127
Nay	40	0	0	1	1	42
Second article	Party					Total votes
Second article	Democratic	Republican	Conservative	Conservative Republican	Independent Republican	Total votes
Yea	0	124	0	0	0	124
Nay	39	0	0	1	1	41
Third article	Party					Total votes
Third article	Democratic	Republican	Conservative	Conservative Republican	Independent Republican	Total votes
Yea	1	123	0	0	0	124
Nay	38	0	0	1	1	40
Fourth article	Party					Total votes
Fourth article	Democratic	Republican	Conservative	Conservative Republican	Independent Republican	Total votes
Yea	1	116	0	0	0	117
Nay	39	0	0	0	1	40
Fifth article	Party					Total votes
Fifth article	Democratic	Republican	Conservative	Conservative Republican	Independent Republican	Total votes
Yea	0	127	0	0	0	127
Nay	40	0	0	1	1	42
Sixth article	Party					Total votes
Sixth article	Democratic	Republican	Conservative	Conservative Republican	Independent Republican	Total votes
Yea	0	127	0	0	0	127
Nay	40	0	0	1	1	42
Seventh article	Party					Total votes
Seventh article	Democratic	Republican	Conservative	Conservative Republican	Independent Republican	Total votes
Yea	0	127	0	0	0	127
Nay	40	0	0	1	1	42
Eighth article	Party					Total votes
Eighth article	Democratic	Republican	Conservative	Conservative Republican	Independent Republican	Total votes
Yea	0	127	0	0	0	127
Nay	40	0	0	1	1	42
Ninth article	Party					Total votes
Ninth article	Democratic	Republican	Conservative	Conservative Republican	Independent Republican	Total votes
Yea	0	108	0	0	0	108
Nay	39	0	0	1	1	41

==== March 3, 1868 ====
After the March 2 adoption of articles of impeachment, the House appointed the impeachment managers that would serve as prosecutors in the impeachment trial before the Senate. The following day, in hopes of strengthening the case that they would bring before the Senate, the impeachment managers requested that the House consider additional charges. First, the managers reported the article previously proposed by Butler, which they reintroduced as the tenth article. It was approved. After this, an eleventh article drafted by Thaddeus Stevens and James F. Wilson was approved. The eleventh article accused Johnson of violating his oath of office to "take care that the laws be faithfully executed" by declaring that the 39th United States Congress was unconstitutional because it only represented some of the United States (with unreconstructed states being excluded) and therefore lacked legislative powers or the power to propose amendments to the Constitution of the United States.

March 3, 1868, vote totals
Tenth article	Party					Total votes
Tenth article	Democratic	Republican	Conservative	Conservative Republican	Independent Republican	Total votes
Yea	0	88	0	0	0	88
Nay	31	12	0	1	1	45
Eleventh article	Party					Total votes
Eleventh article	Democratic	Republican	Conservative	Conservative Republican	Independent Republican	Total votes
Yea	0	109	0	0	0	109
Nay	30	0	0	1	1	32

=== Summary of the articles ===
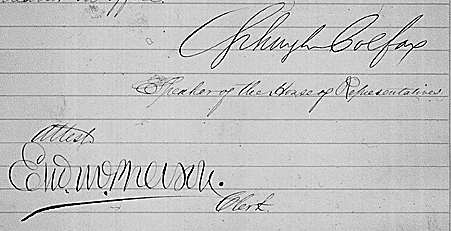
Signature of Speaker of the House Schuyler Colfax (upper right) and an attestation of Edward McPherson, clerk of the United States House of Representatives (lower left) on an official copy of the eleven articles of impeachment

Both the first eight articles and the eleventh article adopted in the House related to Johnson violating the Tenure of Office Act by attempting to dismiss Secretary of War Stanton. In addition, several of these articles also accused Johnson of violating other acts, and the eleventh article also accused Johnson of violating his oath of office. The first article specifically alleged that Johnson's February 21, 1868, order to remove Stanton was made with intent to violate the Tenure of Office Act. The second and third articles argued that the appointment of Thomas as secretary of war ad interim was similarly done with intent to violate the Tenure of Office Act. The fourth, fifth, sixth, and seventh articles alleged conspiring between Johnson, Thomas, and others to oust Stanton. The sixth article also alleged a conspiracy to forcefully seize the property of the United States Department of War. The eighth article specifically alleged that the appointment of Thomas ad interim was with the intent of unlawfully controlling the property of the Department of War. The eleventh article effectively provided a restatement of the first nine articles.

The ninth article focused on an accusation that Johnson had violated the Command of Army Act, a charge reiterated by the eleventh article. The tenth article charged Johnson with attempting, "to bring into disgrace, ridicule, hatred, contempt, and reproach the Congress of the United States", but did not cite a clear violation of the law.

The eleven articles presented the following charges:

- Article 1: That Johnson had violated the Tenure of Office Act in his February 21, 1868, order to remove Secretary of War Stanton
- Article 2: That Johnson had violated the Tenure of Office Act by sending "a letter of authority" to Lorenzo Thomas regarding his appointment to be acting Secretary of War when there was, in fact, no legal vacancy, because Secretary Stanton had been removed in violation of the Tenure of Office Act
- Article 3: That Johnson had violated the Tenure of Office Act by appointing Lorenzo Thomas to be acting Secretary of War when there was, in fact, no legal vacancy, because Secretary Stanton had been removed in violation of the Tenure of Office Act
- Article 4: That Johnson violated the Tenure of Office Act by conspiring with Lorenzo Thomas and others "unlawfully to hinder and prevent Edwin M. Stanton, then and there Secretary of the Department of War" from carrying out his duties
- Article 5: That Johnson had conspired with Lorenzo Thomas and others to "prevent and hinder the execution" of the Tenure of Office Act
- Article 6: That Johnson had violated both the Tenure of Office Act and An Act to Define and Punish Certain Conspiracies by conspiring with Lorenzo Thomas "by force to seize, take, and possess the property of the United States in the Department of War" under control of Secretary Stanton in violation of, thereby committing a high crime in office
- Article 7: That Johnson had violated the Office Act and An Act to Define by conspiring with Lorenzo Thomas "by force to seize, take, and possess the property of the United States in the Department of War" under control of Secretary Stanton, thereby committing a high misdemeanor in office
- Article 8: That Johnson had unlawfully sought "to control the disbursements of the moneys appropriated for the military service and for the Department of War", by moving to remove Secretary Stanton and appoint Lorenzo Thomas
- Article 9: That Johnson had violated the Command of Army Act by unlawfully instructing Major General William H. Emory to ignore as unconstitutional the 1867 Army Appropriations Act language that all orders issued by the President and Secretary of War "relating to military operations ... shall be issued through the General of the Army"
- Article 10: That Johnson had on numerous occasions, made "with a loud voice, certain intemperate, inflammatory, and scandalous harangues, and did therein utter loud threats and bitter menaces ... against Congress [and] the laws of the United States duly enacted thereby, amid the cries, jeers and laughter of the multitudes then assembled and within hearing"
- Article 11: That Johnson had violated his oath of office to "take care that the laws be faithfully executed" by unlawfully and unconstitutionally challenging the authority of the 39th Congress to legislate due to unreconstructed southern states had not been readmitted to the Union; violated the Tenure of Office Act by removing Secretary of War Stanton; contrived to fail to execute the Command of Army Act, which directs that executive orders to the military be issued through the General of the Army; and prevented the execution of an act entitled "An act to provide for the more efficient government of the rebel states".

== Trial ==
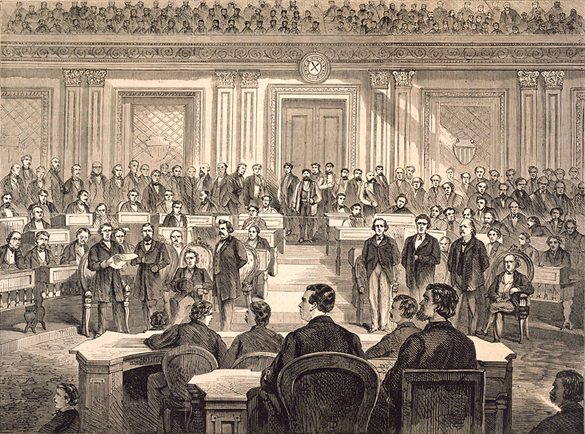
Illustration of Bingham presenting the articles of impeachment to the Senate

The articles of impeachment were presented to the Senate by John Bingham on March 4, 1868. As prescribed by the U.S. Constitution, chief justice of the United States Salmon P. Chase presided over the trial. The extent of Chase's authority as presiding officer to render unilateral rulings was a frequent point of contention. Chase maintained that deciding certain procedural questions on his own was his prerogative, but the Senate challenged several of his rulings.

The House appointed seven members to serve as House impeachment managers, equivalent to prosecutors: John Bingham, George S. Boutwell, Benjamin Butler, John A. Logan, Thaddeus Stevens, Thomas Williams, and James F. Wilson. The president's defense team was made up of Benjamin Robbins Curtis, William M. Evarts, William S. Groesbeck, Thomas Amos Rogers Nelson, and Henry Stanbery. On the advice of counsel, the president did not appear at the trial.

=== Proceedings ===
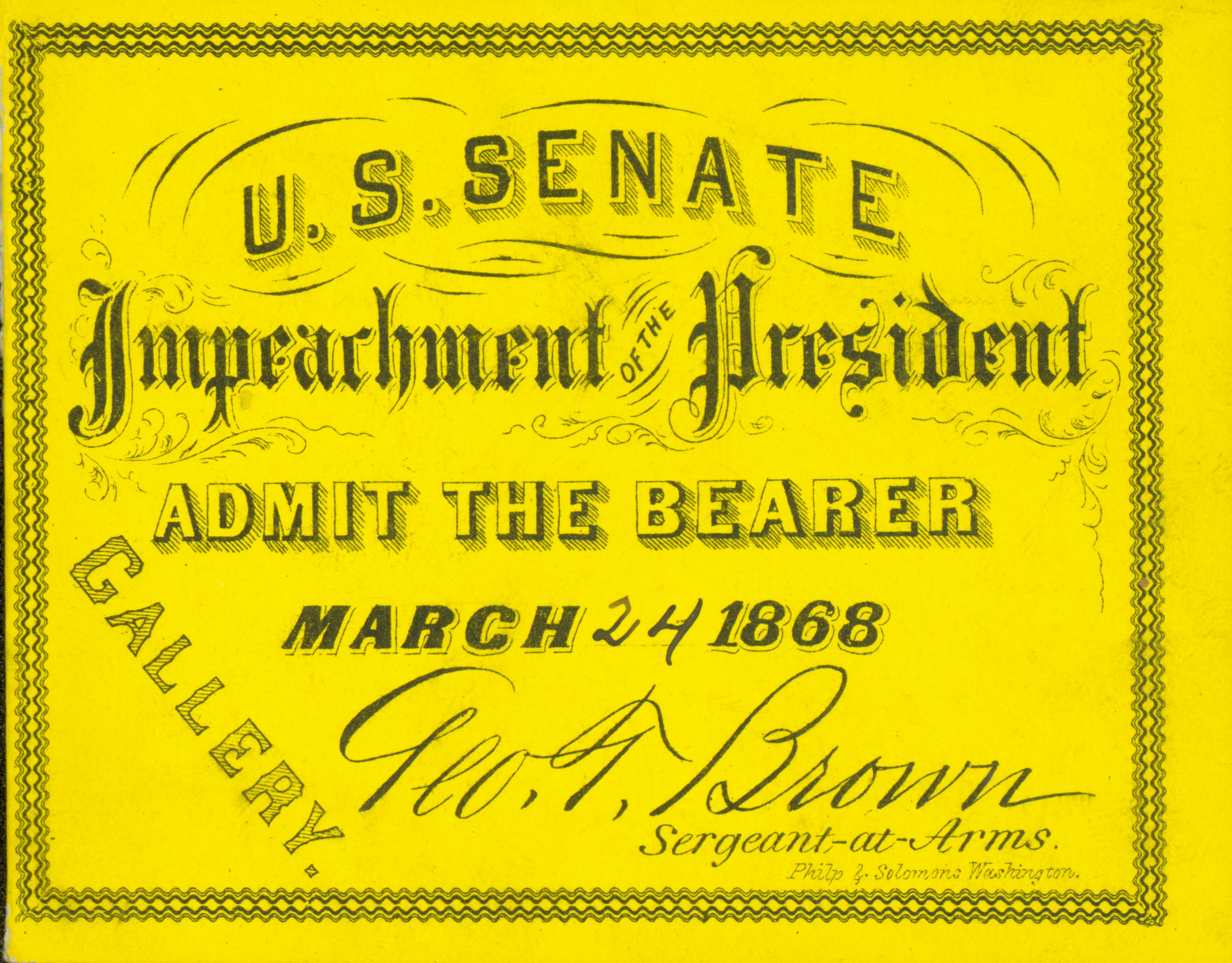
Andrew Johnson impeachment trial admission ticket dated March 24, 1868

The Senate trial opened on March 4, 1868, and was conducted mostly in open session. The Senate chamber galleries were often filled to capacity. Public interest was so great that the Senate issued admission passes for the first time in its history. For each day of the trial, 1,000 color coded tickets were printed, granting admittance for a single day.

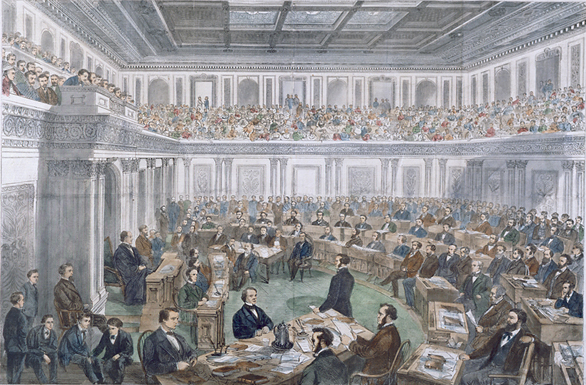
Andrew Johnson's impeachment trial as illustrated by Theodore R. Davis in Harper's Weekly

The impeachment managers argued that Johnson had explicitly violated the Tenure of Office Act by dismissing Stanton without the consent of the Senate. They contended that U.S. presidents were obligated to carry out and honor the laws passed by the United States Congress, regardless of whether they believed them to be constitutional, arguing that, otherwise, presidents would be allowed to regularly disobey the will of Congress (which they argued, as elected representatives, represented the will of the American people).

The defense both questioned the criminality of the alleged offenses and raised doubts about Johnson's intent. One of the points made by the defense was that ambiguity existed in the Tenure of Office Act that left open a vagueness as to whether it was actually applicable to Johnson's firing of Stanton. They also argued that the Tenure of Office Act was unconstitutional, and that Johnson's intent in firing Stanton had been to test the constitutionality of the law before the Supreme Court of the United States (and that Johnson was entitled to do so). They further argued that, even if the law were constitutional, that presidents should not be removed from office for misconstruing their constitutional rights. They further argued that Johnson was acting in the interest of the necessity of keeping the Department of War functional by appointing Lorenzo Thomas as an interim officer, and that he had caused no public harm in doing so. They also argued that the Republican Party was using impeachment as a political tool. The defense asserted the view that presidents should not be removed from office by impeachment for political misdeeds, as this is what elections were meant for.

=== Verdict ===
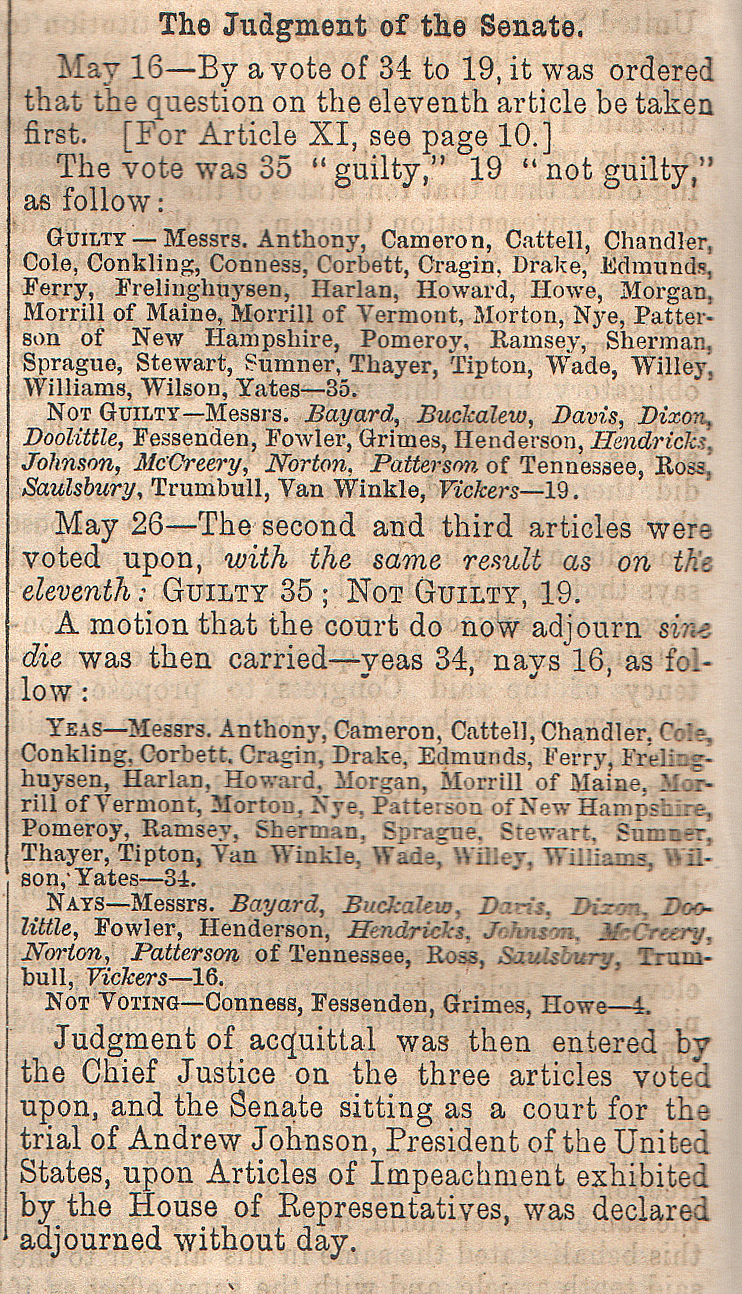
Judgment of the Senate

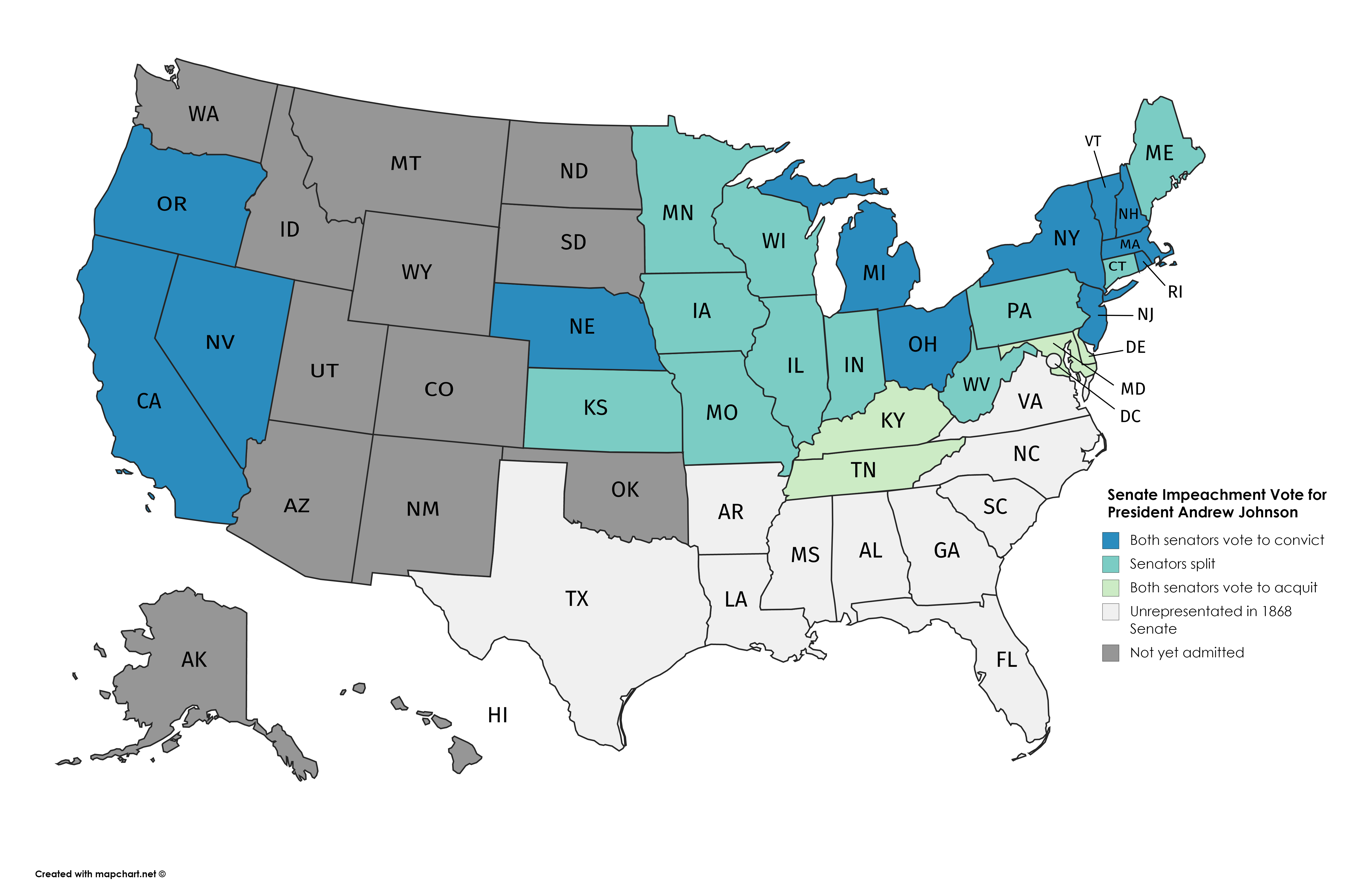
Map of the senator votes for Andrew Johnson's impeachment.

The Senate was composed of 54 members representing 27 states (10 former Confederate states had not yet been readmitted to representation in the Senate) at the time of the trial. At its conclusion, senators voted on three of the articles of impeachment. On each occasion the vote was 35–19, with 35 senators voting guilty and 19 not guilty. As the constitutional threshold for a conviction in an impeachment trial is a two-thirds majority guilty vote, 36 votes in this instance, Johnson was not convicted. He remained in office through the end of his term on March 4, 1869, though without influence on public policy. All nine Senate Democrats voted against conviction. Ten Republicans refused to support their party and voted against conviction.

The first vote was taken on May 16 for the eleventh article. Prior to the vote, Samuel C. Pomeroy told Senator Ross that if Ross voted for acquittal that Ross would become the subject of an investigation for bribery. Afterward, in hopes of persuading at least one senator who voted not guilty to change his vote, the Senate adjourned for 10 days before continuing voting on the other articles. During the hiatus, the House passed a resolution to launch an investigation by the impeachment managers of alleged "improper or corrupt means used to influence the determination of the Senate". Despite the Radical Republican leadership's heavy-handed efforts to change the outcome, when votes were cast on May 26 for the second and third articles, the results were the same as the first. After this, the Senate voted to adjourn the trial sine die.

After the trial, Butler conducted hearings on the widespread reports that Republican senators had been bribed to vote for Johnson's acquittal. In Butler's hearings, and in subsequent inquiries, there was increasing evidence that some acquittal votes were acquired by promises of patronage jobs and cash bribes. Political deals were struck as well. Grimes received assurances that acquittal would not be followed by presidential reprisals; Johnson agreed to enforce the Reconstruction Acts, and to appoint General John Schofield to succeed Stanton. Nonetheless, the investigations never resulted in charges, much less convictions, against anyone.

Moreover, there is evidence that the prosecution attempted to bribe the senators voting for acquittal to switch their votes to conviction. Senator Fessenden was offered the ministership to Great Britain. Prosecutor Butler said, "Tell [Senator Ross] that if he wants money there is a bushel of it here to be had." Butler's investigation also boomeranged when it was discovered that Senator Pomeroy, who voted for conviction, had written a letter to Johnson's postmaster general seeking a $40,000 bribe for Pomeroy's acquittal vote along with three or four others in his caucus. Butler was himself told by Wade that Wade would appoint Butler as secretary of state when Wade assumed the presidency after a Johnson conviction. An opinion that Senator Ross was mercilessly persecuted for his courageous vote to sustain the independence of the presidency as a branch of the federal government is the subject of an entire chapter in President John F. Kennedy's book, Profiles in Courage. The 1964-65 NBC network series "Profiles in Courage" based on Kennedy's book included much the same information about Senator Ross in Episode 19, Edmund G. Ross, starring Bradford Dillman as Ross. That opinion has been rejected by some scholars, such as Ralph Roske, and endorsed by others, such as Avery Craven.

None of the Republican senators who voted for acquittal ever again served in an elected office. Although they were under intense pressure to change their votes to conviction during the trial, afterward public opinion rapidly shifted around to their viewpoint. Some senators who voted for conviction, such as John Sherman and even Charles Sumner, later changed their minds.

Articles of Impeachment, U.S. Senate judgment (36 "guilty" votes necessary for a conviction)
May 16, 1868 Article XI	Party		Total votes
May 16, 1868 Article XI	Democratic	Republican	Total votes
Yea (guilty)	0	35	35
Nay (not guilty)	9	10	19
May 26, 1868 Article II	Party		Total votes
May 26, 1868 Article II	Democratic	Republican	Total votes
Yea (guilty)	0	35	35
Nay (not guilty)	9	10	19
May 26, 1868 Article III	Party		Total votes
May 26, 1868 Article III	Democratic	Republican	Total votes
Yea (guilty)	0	35	35
Nay (Not guilty)	9	10	19
Detail of roll call: Senator / Party–state / Art. XI vote / Art. II vote / Art. III vote; Henry B. Anthony / R–RI / Yea / Yea / Yea; James A. Bayard Jr. / D–DE / Nay / Nay / Nay; Charles R. Buckalew / D–PA / Nay / Nay / Nay; Simon Cameron / R–PA / Yea / Yea / Yea; Alexander G. Cattell / R–NJ / Yea / Yea / Yea; Zachariah Chandler / R–MI / Yea / Yea / Yea; Cornelius Cole / R–CA / Yea / Yea / Yea; Roscoe Conkling / R–NY / Yea / Yea / Yea; John Conness / R–CA / Yea / Yea / Yea; Henry W. Corbett / R–OR / Yea / Yea / Yea; Aaron H. Cragin / R–NH / Yea / Yea / Yea; Garrett Davis / D–KY / Nay / Nay / Nay; James Dixon / R–CT / Nay / Nay / Nay; James Rood Doolittle / R–WI / Nay / Nay / Nay; Charles D. Drake / R–MO / Yea / Yea / Yea; George F. Edmunds / R–VT / Yea / Yea / Yea; Orris S. Ferry / R–CT / Yea / Yea / Yea; William P. Fessenden / R–ME / Nay / Nay / Nay; Joseph S. Fowler / R–TN / Nay / Nay / Nay; Frederick T. Frelinghuysen / R–NJ / Yea / Yea / Yea; James W. Grimes / R–IA / Nay / Nay / Nay; James Harlan / R–IA / Yea / Yea / Yea; John B. Henderson / R–MO / Nay / Nay / Nay; Thomas A. Hendricks / D–IN / Nay / Nay / Nay; Jacob M. Howard / R–MI / Yea / Yea / Yea; Timothy O. Howe / R–WI / Yea / Yea / Yea; Reverdy Johnson / D–MD / Nay / Nay / Nay; Thomas C. McCreery / D–KY / Nay / Nay / Nay; Edwin D. Morgan / R–NY / Yea / Yea / Yea; Justin S. Morrill / R–VT / Yea / Yea / Yea; Lot M. Morrill / R–ME / Yea / Yea / Yea; Oliver P. Morton / R–IN / Yea / Yea / Yea; Daniel Sheldon Norton / R–MN / Nay / Nay / Nay; James W. Nye / R–NV / Yea / Yea / Yea; David T. Patterson / D–TN / Nay / Nay / Nay; James W. Patterson / R–NH / Yea / Yea / Yea; Samuel C. Pomeroy / R–KS / Yea / Yea / Yea; Alexander Ramsey / R–MN / Yea / Yea / Yea; Edmund G. Ross / R–KS / Nay / Nay / Nay; Willard Saulsbury Sr. / D–DE / Nay / Nay / Nay; John Sherman / R–OH / Yea / Yea / Yea; William Sprague IV / R–RI / Yea / Yea / Yea; William M. Stewart / R–NV / Yea / Yea / Yea; Charles Sumner / R–MA / Yea / Yea / Yea; John Milton Thayer / R–NE / Yea / Yea / Yea; Thomas Tipton / R–NE / Yea / Yea / Yea; Lyman Trumbull / R–IL / Nay / Nay / Nay; Peter G. Van Winkle / R–WV / Nay / Nay / Nay; George Vickers / D–MD / Nay / Nay / Nay; Benjamin Wade / R–OH / Yea / Yea / Yea; Waitman T. Willey / R–WV / Yea / Yea / Yea; George Henry Williams / R–OR / Yea / Yea / Yea; Henry Wilson / R–MA / Yea / Yea / Yea; Richard Yates / R–IL / Yea / Yea / Yea; Sources:

== Later analysis of Johnson's impeachment ==
In 1887, the Tenure of Office Act was repealed by Congress, and subsequent rulings by the United States Supreme Court seemed to support Johnson's position that he was entitled to fire Stanton without congressional approval. The Supreme Court's ruling on a similar piece of later legislation in Myers v. United States (1926) affirmed the ability of the president to remove a postmaster without congressional approval, and the dictum of the majority opinion stated, "that the Tenure of Office Act of 1867...was invalid".

Lyman Trumbull of Illinois (one of the ten Republican senators whose refusal to vote for conviction prevented Johnson's removal from office) noted in his speech explaining his vote for acquittal, that, had Johnson been convicted, the main source of the American presidency's political power (the freedom for a president to disagree with the Congress without consequences) would have been destroyed, as would the Constitution's system of checks and balances. Indeed, the impeachment and trial of Andrew Johnson had long-lasting effects on the separation of powers. It established the rule that Congress should not remove the president due to a conflict over the structure of their administration. It also resulted in diminished presidential influence on public policy and overall governing power, fostering a system of governance which future-President Woodrow Wilson referred to in the 1880s as "Congressional Government".

== See also ==
- Timeline of the impeachment of Andrew Johnson
- Impeachment process against Richard Nixon
- Impeachment of Bill Clinton
- First impeachment of Donald Trump
- Second impeachment of Donald Trump
- List of federal political scandals in the United States
- Tennessee Johnson, a 1942 film about Andrew Johnson, depicting the events surrounding his impeachment
