= John A. Magee =

American politician

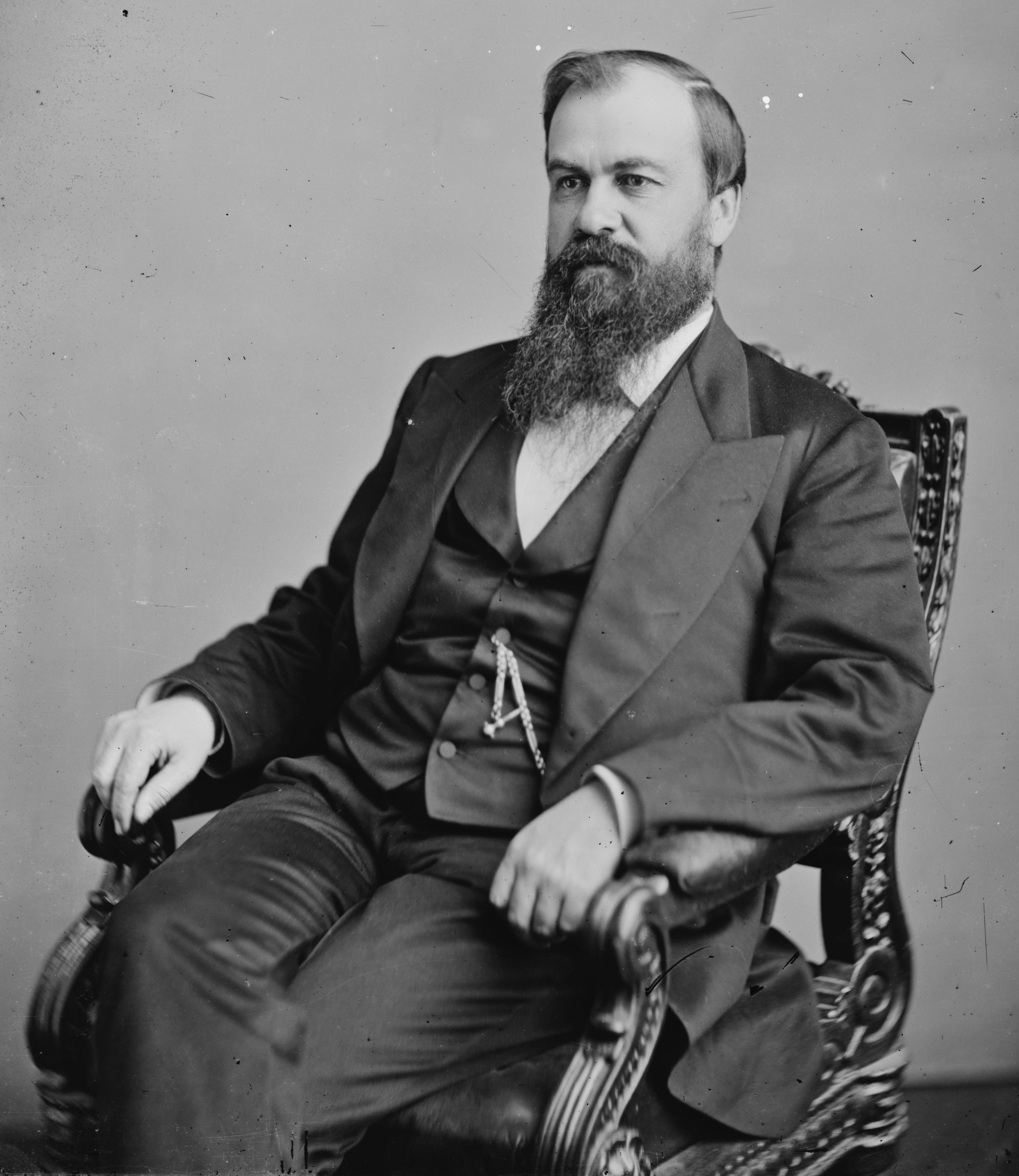
John Alexander Magee

John Alexander Magee (October 14, 1827 – November 18, 1903) was a Democratic member of the U.S. House of Representatives from Pennsylvania.

John A. Magee was born in Landisburg, Pennsylvania. He attended the common schools and was graduated from New Bloomfield Academy. He engaged in the printing business and for a number of years published the Perry County Democrat. He was a member of the Pennsylvania State House of Representatives in 1863. He was a delegate to the Democratic National Convention in 1868, 1876, and 1896.

Magee was elected as a Democrat to the Forty-third Congress. He was an unsuccessful candidate for renomination in 1874. He resumed his former business pursuits, and died in New Bloomfield, Pennsylvania, in 1903. Interment in Bloomfield Cemetery.

== Sources ==
- United States Congress. "John A. Magee (id: M000048)". Biographical Directory of the United States Congress.
- The Political Graveyard

U.S. House of Representatives
Preceded by Richard J. Haldeman	Member of the U.S. House of Representatives from Pennsylvania's 15th congressional district 1873 - 1875	Succeeded by Joseph Powell
