= Lemuel Todd =

American politician

Member of the United States House of Representatives from Pennsylvania's 16th congressional district
- In office March 4, 1855 – March 3, 1857
- Preceded by: William Henry Kurtz
- Succeeded by: John A. Ahl

Member of the U.S. House of Representatives from Pennsylvania's at-large congressional district
- In office March 4, 1873 – March 3, 1875
- Preceded by: Seat created
- Succeeded by: Seat eliminated

Personal details
- Born: July 29, 1817 Carlisle, Pennsylvania, US
- Died: May 12, 1891 (aged 73) Carlisle, Pennsylvania, US
- Spouse: Sarah Anna Watson
- Education: Dickinson College
- Profession: Law

Lemuel Todd (July 29, 1817 – May 12, 1891) was an American politician who served as an Oppositionist member of the U.S. House of Representatives from Pennsylvania's 16th congressional district from 1855 to 1857 and as a Republican member of the U.S. House of Representatives from Pennsylvania's at-large congressional district from 1873 to 1875. He was an officer in the Pennsylvania Reserves infantry division of the Union Army in the U.S. Civil War and served in multiple battles.

== Early life and education ==
Lemuel Todd was born in Carlisle, Pennsylvania and graduated from Dickinson College in Carlisle in 1839. After graduation, he studied law in the offices of General Samuel Alexander. Todd was admitted to the Cumberland County bar in 1841 and began his law practice in Carlisle.

== Military service ==
At the outbreak of the civil war, Todd raised a company of volunteers from Cumberland County. The unit, known as the Carlisle Guards, was accepted into service of the Union Army as Company I of the 1st Pennsylvania Reserve Regiment. Todd served as Captain of Company I and was promoted to Major and third in command of the regiment. He fought with the 1st Pennsylvania reserves at the Battle of Gaines's Mill, the Battle of Second Bull Run and the Battle of South Mountain. He briefly assumed command of the regiment when Colonel Richard Biddle Roberts was assigned to brigade command at the Battle of Gaines's Mill.

In 1862, severe illness forced Todd to resign from the regiment. He continued to support the Union Army by organizing the influx of drafted men in the eastern half of Pennsylvania at Philadelphia. Pennsylvania Governor Andrew Gregg Curtin appointed him Inspector General of state troops on the governor's staff. He had responsibility for militia and State Guard units especially during the confederate army invasion of Pennsylvania led by General Robert E. Lee in 1863.

After the war, Todd returned to law practice in Carlisle.

== Political career ==
In 1854, Todd was elected as an Oppositionist member of the 34th United States Congress representing the Pennsylvania's 16th congressional district. He served on the Committee on Indian Affairs and the Committee for Public Buildings and Grounds. He was an unsuccessful Republican candidate for reelection in 1856.

In 1872, Todd was elected as a Republican member to the 43rd United States Congress representing Pennsylvania's at-large congressional district. He served on the Committees on Elections and Expenditures in the Post Office Department. He was not a candidate for renomination in 1874. He resumed the practice of law, and died in Carlisle in 1891.

== Personal life ==
In 1849, Todd married Sarah Anna Watson of Adams County and together they had several children.

== See also ==
U.S. House of Representatives
Preceded by William Henry Kurtz	Member of the U.S. House of Representatives from Pennsylvania's 16th congressional district March 4, 1855 – March 3, 1857	Succeeded by John A. Ahl
Preceded by Seat created	Member of the U.S. House of Representatives from Pennsylvania's at-large congressional district Elected on a general ticket alongside: Charles Albright and Glenni W. Scofield; March 4, 1873 – March 3, 1875	Succeeded by Seat eliminated
