= Joseph Powell (American politician) =

American politician

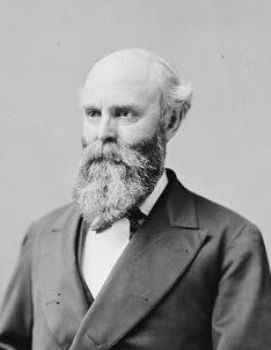
Joseph Powell, Pennsylvania Congressman

Joseph Powell (June 23, 1828 – April 24, 1904) was a Democratic member of the U.S. House of Representatives from Pennsylvania.

Joseph Powell was born in Towanda, Pennsylvania. He completed preparatory studies and engaged in mercantile pursuits. He was president of the First National Bank of Towanda from 1870 to 1889.

Powell was elected as a Democrat to the Forty-fourth Congress. He was an unsuccessful candidate for reelection in 1876.

He was appointed special deputy collector of the port of Philadelphia in 1885 and served four years. He was sheriff of Bradford County, Pennsylvania, from 1889 to 1893. He died in Towanda in 1904, and was interred in Oak Hill Cemetery.

== Sources ==
- United States Congress. "Joseph Powell (id: P000480)". Biographical Directory of the United States Congress.
- The Political Graveyard

Party political offices
| Preceded by Orange Noble | Democratic nominee for Treasurer of Pennsylvania; 1883 | Succeeded by Conrad B. Day |
U.S. House of Representatives
| Preceded by John A. Magee | Member of the U.S. House of Representatives from Pennsylvania's 15th congressional district 1875 - 1877 | Succeeded by Edward Overton, Jr. |
