= United States Senate Journal =

Written record of proceedings within the US Senate

The United States Senate Journal is a written record of proceedings within the United States Senate in accordance with Article I, Section 5 of the U.S. Constitution.

Each House shall keep a journal of its proceedings, and from time to time publish the same, excepting such parts as may in their judgment require secrecy; and the yeas and nays of the members of either House, on any question, shall, at the desire of one-fifth of those present, be entered on the journal.

According to the Library of Congress, the Senate Journal should be seen as the minutes of floor action. It notes the matters considered by the Senate and the votes and other actions taken. It does not record the actual debates, which can be consulted through the "Link to date-related documents" in the full text transcription of the Journal. Historically, the Journal of the Senate, like Journal of the House of Representatives and Journals of the House of Commons and the House of Lords in British Parliament, was an important source of parliamentary law.

The Senate Journal was often used as a means to filibuster legislation as the Senate rules state that "the reading of the Journal shall not be suspended unless by unanimous consent". The first time this was used was when the Dyer Anti-Lynching Bill was discussed in 1922, the Mississippi Senator Pat Harrison started discussing the Senate Journal and was unable to be clotured until the sponsors withdrew the Bill.

== See also ==
- Congressional Record
- Federal Register, the official daily publication for rules, proposed rules, and notices of US federal agencies and organizations
- Hansard, British parliamentary record
- United States House Journal

== Sources ==
- Library of Congress: United States Senate Journal
- upenn.edu
