= Benjamin Franklin Junkin =

American politician (1822–1908)

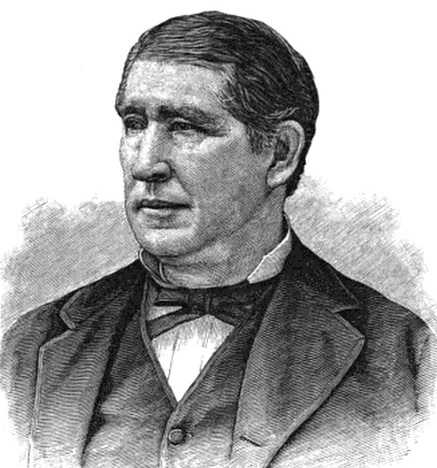

Member of the U.S. House of Representatives from Pennsylvania's 16th district
- In office March 4, 1859 – March 3, 1861
- Preceded by: John Alexander Ahl
- Succeeded by: Joseph Bailey

Personal details
- Born: November 12, 1822 near Carlisle, Pennsylvania, U.S.
- Died: October 9, 1908 (aged 85) New Bloomfield, Pennsylvania, U.S.
- Resting place: New Bloomfield Cemetery, New Bloomfield, Pennsylvania, U.S.
- Party: Republican
- Spouse(s): Ann McGowan; Laura McClurkin
- Children: 2
- Parent(s): John Junkin; Maria Adams
- Education: Lafayette College
- Profession: Politician, lawyer, judge

Benjamin Franklin Junkin (November 12, 1822 – October 9, 1908) was an American politician, lawyer, and judge who served a single term in the United States House of Representatives, representing the 16th congressional district of Pennsylvania from 1859 to 1861 as a Republican in the 36th United States Congress.

== Early life and education ==
Junkin was born near Carlisle, Pennsylvania, on November 12, 1822, to John Junkin and Maria Adams. He graduated from Lafayette College and studied law.

== Career ==
Junkin was admitted to the bar in 1844; he commenced practice in New Bloomfield, Pennsylvania. Junkin served as district attorney for Perry County, Pennsylvania, from 1850 to 1853.

Junkin was elected as a Republican to the 36th United States Congress. He served from 1859 to 1861, representing the 16th congressional district of Pennsylvania. Junkin was an unsuccessful candidate for re-election in 1860.

Following his tenure in Congress, Junkin resumed practicing law in New Bloomfield, serving as president judge of the ninth judicial district from 1871 to 1881. Junkin served as solicitor of the Pennsylvania Railroad Company from 1886 to his death in 1908.

== Personal life and death ==
Junkin married both Ann McGowan and Laura McClurkin; he had two children with the former.

Junkin was a Presbyterian.

Junkin died at the age of 85 in New Bloomfield, Pennsylvania, on October 9, 1908. He was interred in New Bloomfield Cemetery.

== See also ==
- List of United States representatives who served a single term

U.S. House of Representatives
Preceded by John Alexander Ahl	Member of the U.S. House of Representatives from Pennsylvania's 16th congressional district 1859–1861	Succeeded by Joseph Bailey
