= Joseph Bailey (Pennsylvania politician) =

American politician

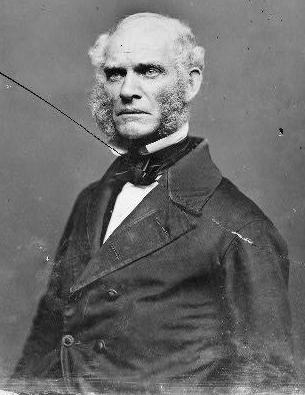

Member of the U.S. House of Representatives from Pennsylvania
- In office March 4, 1861 – March 3, 1865
- Preceded by: Benjamin F. Junkin
- Succeeded by: Adam J. Glossbrenner
- Constituency: 16th district (1861–1863); 15th district (1863–1865)

22nd Treasurer of Pennsylvania
- In office 1854–1855
- Governor: William Bigler
- Preceded by: John M. Bickel
- Succeeded by: Eli Slifer

Member of the Pennsylvania Senate for the 4th district
- In office 1851–1853

Member of the Pennsylvania Senate for the 1st district
- In office 1843
- Preceded by: William A. Crabb
- Succeeded by: Charles L. Gibbons

Member of the Pennsylvania House of Representatives
- In office 1840

Personal details
- Born: March 18, 1810 Pennsbury Township, Pennsylvania, U.S.
- Died: August 26, 1885 (aged 75) Bailey's Station, Pennsylvania, U.S.
- Resting place: Bloomfield Cemetery, New Bloomfield, Pennsylvania, U.S.
- Party: Democratic

Joseph Bailey (March 18, 1810 – August 26, 1885) was an American politician from Pennsylvania who served as a Democratic member of the U.S. House of Representatives for Pennsylvania's 16th congressional district from 1861 to 1863 and for Pennsylvania's 15th congressional district from 1863 to 1865.

He served as a member of the Pennsylvania State Senate for the 1st district from 1843 to 1844 and the 4th district from 1851 to 1853. He served as Pennsylvania State Treasurer from 1854 to 1855 and as a member of the Pennsylvania House of Representatives from 1840 to 1841.

== Early life and education ==
Joseph Bailey was born in Pennsbury Township, Pennsylvania. He attended the common schools, and worked as a hatter in Parkersville, Pennsylvania.

== Career ==
He served in the Pennsylvania State House of Representatives in 1840. He was a member of the Pennsylvania State Senate for the 1st district from 1843 to 1844. In 1845, he moved to Perry County, Pennsylvania to become a furnace owner. He was elected again to the Pennsylvania State Senate for the 4th district and served from 1851 to 1853. He served as State Treasurer of Pennsylvania in 1854. He studied law and was admitted to the bar in 1860.

Bailey was elected as a Democrat to the Thirty-seventh and Thirty-eighth Congresses. He was a member of the State Constitutional Convention in 1872. He was one of 14 House Democrats to vote in favor of the Thirteenth Amendment to the United States Constitution on its second and final vote, and also one of 4 to vote in favor of it on its first vote.

He died at Bailey's Station, a hamlet near New Bloomfield, Pennsylvania, on August 26, 1885. He was buried at Bloomfield Cemetery in New Bloomfield.

== Sources ==
- United States Congress. "Joseph Bailey (id: B000043)". Biographical Directory of the United States Congress.
- The Political Graveyard

Pennsylvania House of Representatives
Preceded by	Member of the Pennsylvania House of Representatives; 1840	Succeeded by
Pennsylvania State Senate
Preceded by William A. Crabb	Member of the Pennsylvania Senate, 1st district 1843	Succeeded by Charles L. Gibbons
Preceded by	Member of the Pennsylvania Senate, 4th district 1851-1853	Succeeded by
U.S. House of Representatives
Preceded by Benjamin F. Junkin	Member of the U.S. House of Representatives from Pennsylvania's 16th congressional district 1861–1863	Succeeded by Alexander H. Coffroth
Preceded by James T. Hale	Member of the U.S. House of Representatives from Pennsylvania's 15th congressional district 1863–1865	Succeeded by Adam J. Glossbrenner
Political offices
Preceded by John M. Bickel	Treasurer of Pennsylvania; 1854–1855	Succeeded by Eli Slifer
