= John Alexander Ahl =

American politician

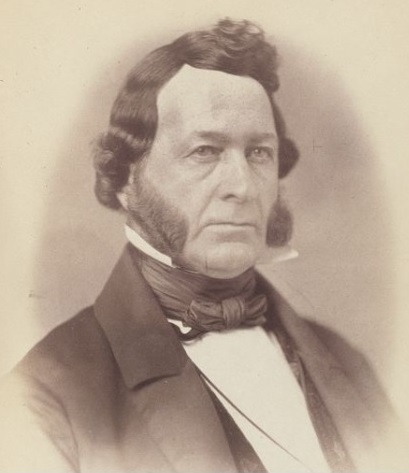

Member of the U.S. House of Representatives from Pennsylvania's 16th district
- In office March 4, 1857 – March 3, 1859
- Preceded by: Lemuel Todd
- Succeeded by: Benjamin F. Junkin

Personal details
- Born: August 16, 1813 Strasburg, Pennsylvania
- Died: April 25, 1882 (aged 68) Newville, Pennsylvania
- Party: Democratic
- Education: University of Maryland
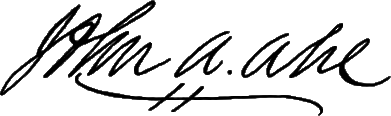
- Signature

John Alexander Ahl (August 16, 1813 – April 25, 1882) was a surgeon, real estate developer, paper mill and iron furnace operator, railroad executive and United States Congressman from Pennsylvania. He was born in Strasburg, Pennsylvania in 1813.

== Life and career ==
Ahl studied medicine at the University of Maryland, and graduated in 1832. He moved to Centerville, Pennsylvania, where he practiced medicine through 1856. That year, he began in the real estate business, bought a paper mill in Newville, Pennsylvania, and served as a delegate to the 1856 Democratic National Convention in Cincinnati.

=== Congress ===
He was elected to the United States House of Representatives in 1857, leaving upon the completion of his first term.

=== Later career ===
After Congress, he manufactured paper and operated an iron furnace in Sharpsburg, Maryland. He also served as the planner and the major builder of the Harrisburg and Potomac Railroad.

== Death ==
He died in Newville in 1882, and is buried in Big Spring Presbyterian Cemetery.

U.S. House of Representatives
Preceded by Lemuel Todd	Member of the U.S. House of Representatives from Pennsylvania's 16th congressional district 1857–1859	Succeeded by Benjamin F. Junkin
