= Richard Jacobs Haldeman =

American politician (1831–1886)

Richard J. Haldeman
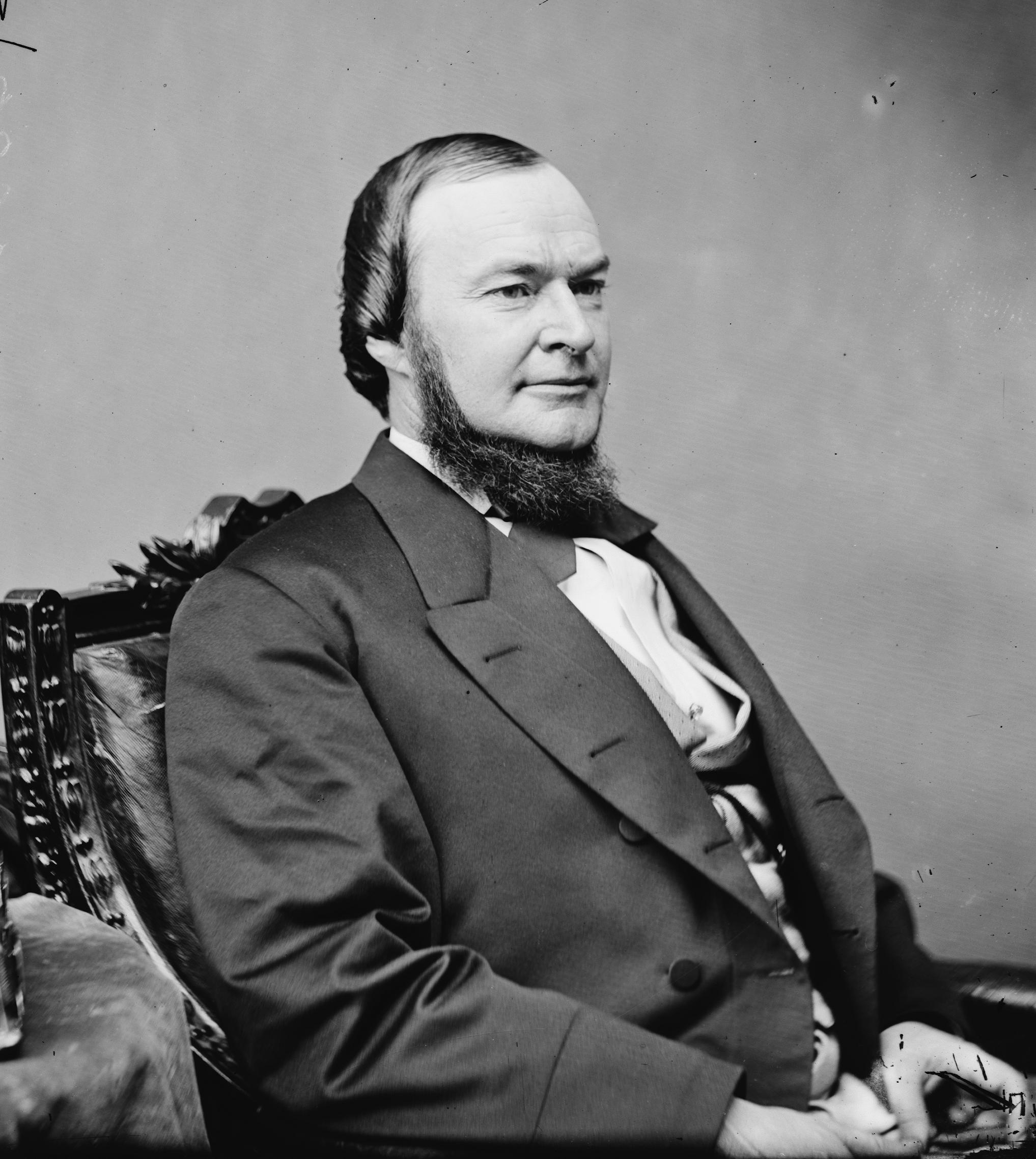

Member of the U.S. House of Representatives from Pennsylvania's 15th district
- In office March 4, 1869 – March 3, 1873
- Preceded by: Adam John Glossbrenner
- Succeeded by: John Alexander Magee

Personal details
- Born: May 19, 1831 Harrisburg, Pennsylvania
- Died: October 1, 1886 (aged 55) Harrisburg, Pennsylvania
- Party: Democratic
- Relatives: Jacob S. Haldeman (brother)
- Education: Yale University

Richard Jacobs Haldeman (May 19, 1831 – October 1, 1886) was a Democratic member of the U.S. House of Representatives from Pennsylvania for two terms from 1869 to 1873.

== Life and career ==
=== Education ===
Richard J. Haldeman was born in Harrisburg, Pennsylvania. He pursued an academic course, and was graduated from Yale College in 1851. While at Yale, he was a member of the Skull and Bones Society. He also attended Heidelberg and Berlin Universities.

== Political career ==
He served as United States attaché of the legation at Paris in 1853 and later occupied similar positions at St. Petersburg and Vienna.

He returned to Harrisburg and purchased the Daily and Weekly Patriot and Union and was its editor until 1860. He was a delegate to the Democratic National Conventions at Baltimore, Maryland, and Charleston, South Carolina, in 1860.

=== Congress ===
Haldeman was elected as a Democrat to the Forty-first and Forty-second Congresses. He was not a candidate for renomination in 1872. He retired from active pursuits, and died in Harrisburg in 1886. Interment in Harrisburg Cemetery.

== Sources ==
- United States Congress. "Richard Jacobs Haldeman (id: H000027)". Biographical Directory of the United States Congress.
- The Political Graveyard

U.S. House of Representatives
| Preceded by Adam J. Glossbrenner | Member of the U.S. House of Representatives from Pennsylvania's 15th congressional district 1869 - 1873 | Succeeded by John A. Magee |
