= Congressional Record =

Official record of the proceedings of the US Congress

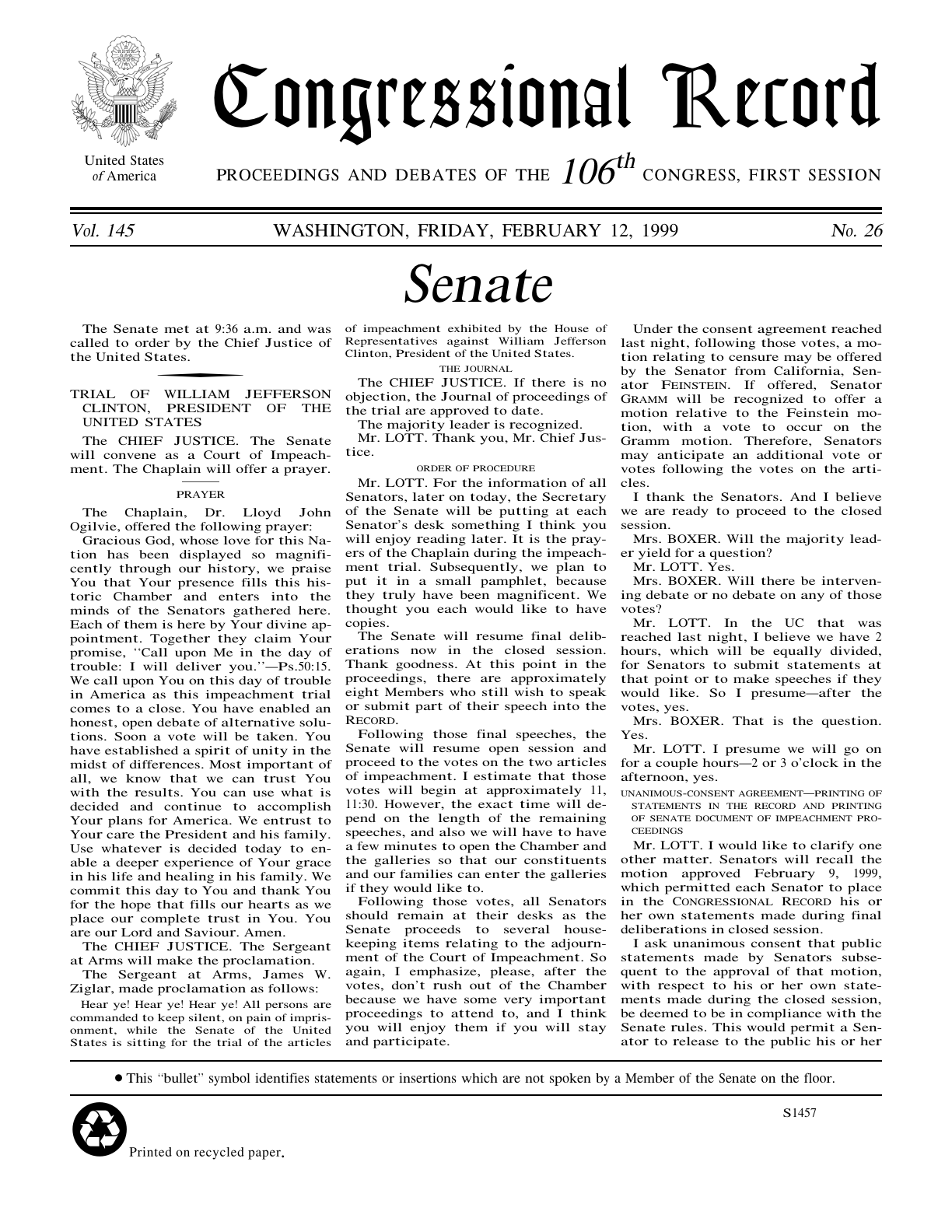
- A page from the February 12, 1999, edition of the Congressional Record, published during the impeachment trial of former President Bill Clinton.
- Categories: Official record of the proceedings and debates of the United States Congress
- Frequency: Daily (when Congress is in session); bound volumes at end of each session
- Publisher: United States Government Publishing Office
- First issue: 1873
- Country: United States
- Language: English
- Website: www.congress.gov/congressional-record

The Congressional Record is the official record of the proceedings and debates of the United States Congress, published by the United States Government Publishing Office (GPO) and issued when Congress is in session. The Congressional Record Index is updated daily online and published monthly. At the end of a session of Congress, the daily editions are compiled into bound volumes that constitute the permanent edition. Chapter 9 of Title 44 of the United States Code authorizes publication of the Congressional Record.

The Congressional Record consists of four sections: the "House" section, the "Senate" section, the "Extensions of Remarks" section, and, since the 1940s, the "Daily Digest", at the back of each issue.The Digest summarizes the day's floor and committee activities and serves as a table of contents for each issue. The House and Senate sections contain proceedings for the separate chambers of Congress.

The Extensions of Remarks section contains speeches, tributes and other extraneous words that were not uttered during open proceedings of the full Senate or of the full House of Representatives. Witnesses in committee hearings are often asked to submit their complete testimony "for the record" and only deliver a summary of it in person. The full statement will then appear in a printed volume of the hearing identified as Statements for the Record. In years past, this particular section of the Congressional Record was called the "Appendix". While members of either body may insert material into Extensions of Remarks, Senators rarely do so. The overwhelming majority of what is found there is entered at the request of Members of the House of Representatives. From a legal standpoint, most materials in the Congressional Record are classified as secondary authority, as part of a statute's legislative history.

By custom and the rules of each house, members also frequently "revise and extend" their remarks made on the floor before the debates are published in the Congressional Record. Therefore, for many years, speeches that were not delivered in Congress appeared in the Congressional Record, including in the sections purporting to be verbatim reports of debates. In recent years, however, these revised remarks have been preceded by a "bullet" symbol or, more recently and currently, printed in a typeface discernibly different from that used to report words spoken by members.

The Congressional Record is publicly available for records before 1875 via the Library of Congress' American Memory Century of Lawmaking website, and since 1989 via Congress.gov (which replaced the THOMAS database in 2016). Thanks to a partnership between the GPO and the Library of Congress, digital versions of the bound editions are available on govinfo.gov for 1873 to 2001 (Volumes 1–147) and 2005 to 2015 (Volumes 151–161). Govinfo.gov also provides access to digital versions of the daily edition from 1994 (Volume 140) to the present.

== History ==
In early United States history, there was no record of Congressional debates. The contemporary British Parliament from which Congress drew its tradition was a highly secretive body, and publishing parliamentary proceedings in Britain did not become legal until 1771. The Constitution, in Article I, Section 5, requires Congress to keep a journal of its proceedings, but both the House Journal and the Senate Journal include only a bare record of actions and votes rather than records of debates. In the first twenty years, Congress made frequent use of secret sessions. Beginning with the War of 1812, public sessions became commonplace.

In the early 1800s, political reporting was dominated by National Intelligencer, the first newspaper of Washington, D.C. Newspapers with reporters in the chamber regularly published floor statements in their reports. Joseph Gales and William Seaton, the editors of the Intelligencer, became regular fixtures in the House and Senate chambers.

In 1824, Gales and Seaton began publishing the Register of Debates, the first series of publications containing congressional debates. The Register of Debates contains summaries of "leading debates and incidents" of the period rather than a verbatim debate transcript. From 1834 to 1856, Gale and Seaton retroactively compiled the Annals of Congress, covering congressional debates from 1789 to 1824 using primarily newspaper accounts.

When Jacksonian Democrats strengthened their hold on the legislative branch in the 1830 elections, Gales and Seaton's popularity declined due to their differing views with the 22nd Congress and the Jackson administration. The new printing partnership of Francis Preston Blair and John Cook Rives founded the Congressional Globe in 1833 with President Andrew Jackson's support. In 1837, the Register of Debates ceased publication.

In 1851, the Congressional Globe began publishing near-verbatim reports of debates thanks to the publication's extensive use of stenographers.

The Congressional Record was first published in 1873 under the oversight of Senate Secretary George Congdon Gorham.

== See also ==
- Federal Register, the official daily publication for rules, proposed rules, and notices of US federal agencies and organizations
- Hansard, British and Commonwealth parliamentary record
- United States House Journal
- United States Senate Journal
