= Adam John Glossbrenner =

American politician (1810–1889)

Adam J. Glossbrenner
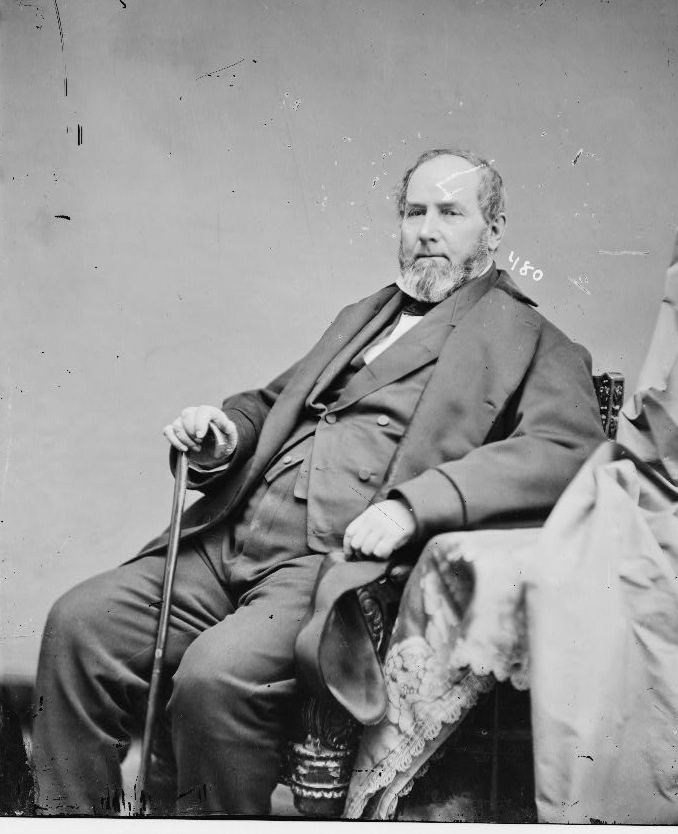

Member of the U.S. House of Representatives from Pennsylvania's 15th district
- In office March 4, 1865 – March 3, 1869
- Preceded by: Joseph Bailey
- Succeeded by: Richard Jacobs Haldeman

Sergeant at Arms of the United States House of Representatives
- In office January 15, 1850 – February 3, 1860
- Preceded by: Nathan Sargent
- Succeeded by: Henry W. Hoffman

Member of the Pennsylvania House of Representatives
- In office 1836

Personal details
- Born: August 31, 1810 Hagerstown, Maryland, U.S.
- Died: March 1, 1889 (aged 78) Philadelphia, Pennsylvania, U.S.
- Party: Democratic

Adam John Glossbrenner (August 31, 1810 – March 1, 1889) was a Democratic member of the U.S. House of Representatives from Pennsylvania.

== Biography ==
Glossbrenner was born in Hagerstown, Maryland. He learned the art of printing, and became publisher of the Western Telegraph in Hamilton, Ohio, in 1827 and 1828. He moved to York, Pennsylvania, in 1829. He established the York County Farmer in 1831, and became a partner in the York Gazette in 1835, and continued his connection with that paper until 1860.

He served as clerk in the Pennsylvania State House of Representatives in 1836. He was Clerk of the United States House of Representatives during the Twenty-eighth and Twenty-ninth Congresses, and in the United States Department of State at Washington, D.C., in 1848 and 1849.

He was Sergeant at Arms of the United States House of Representatives from 1850 to 1860. He served as private secretary to President James Buchanan in 1860 and 1861. He established the Philadelphia Age in 1862, although residing in York, Pennsylvania.

Glossbrenner was elected as a Democrat to the Thirty-ninth and Fortieth Congresses. He was an unsuccessful candidate for reelection in 1868.

Following his political career he engaged in banking in York in 1872. He moved to Philadelphia in 1880, and was employed by the Pennsylvania Railroad until his death in Philadelphia in 1889, aged 78. He was interred in Prospect Hill Cemetery in York, Pennsylvania.

== Sources ==
- United States Congress. "Adam John Glossbrenner (id: G000242)". Biographical Directory of the United States Congress.
- The Political Graveyard

U.S. House of Representatives
Preceded by Nathan Sargent	Sergeant at Arms of the United States House of Representatives; 1850 - 1860	Succeeded by Henry W. Hoffman
Preceded by Joseph Bailey	Member of the U.S. House of Representatives from Pennsylvania's 15th congressional district 1865 - 1869	Succeeded by Richard J. Haldeman
