= United States House Journal =

Written record of proceedings within the US House of Representatives

The Journal of the House of Representatives is a written record of proceedings within the United States House. Article I, Section 5 of the U.S. Constitution requires that the House "keep a Journal of its Proceedings".

The Journal contains only the legislative actions taken by the House. It does not record all debate, which is recorded in the Congressional Record.

The House must approve the journal; these votes are often used as quorum calls or to influence other debates.

Historically, the House Journal was an important source of precedent on questions of legislative procedure and certain areas of constitutional law.

== See also ==
- Hansard, British parliamentary record
- United States Senate Journal
