= Krekel =

Krekel is a surname. Notable people with the surname include:

- Arnold Krekel (1815–1888), United States federal judge
- Hildegard Krekel (1952–2013), German actress
- Lotti Krekel (1941–2023), German singer
- Nicholas Krekel (1825–1910), a German who served in the American army and the founder of O'Fallon, Missouri
- Tim Krekel (1950–2009), American rock musician and country music songwriter

== See also ==
- Jan Krekels (born 1947), Dutch cyclist
- Krekel van der Woerd Wouterse, defunct Dutch management consulting firm
- Tig H Krekel, Served as an Interim Chief Executive Officer of Defense Venture Group, Ltd., as the President and Chief Executive Officer at Hughes Space and Communications, President at Boeing Satellite Systems, Inc., President and the Chief Executive Officer at Aerospace Equipment Systems group of AlliedSignal.
