= 46th United States Congress =

1879-1881 U.S. Congress

←	45th	47th	→
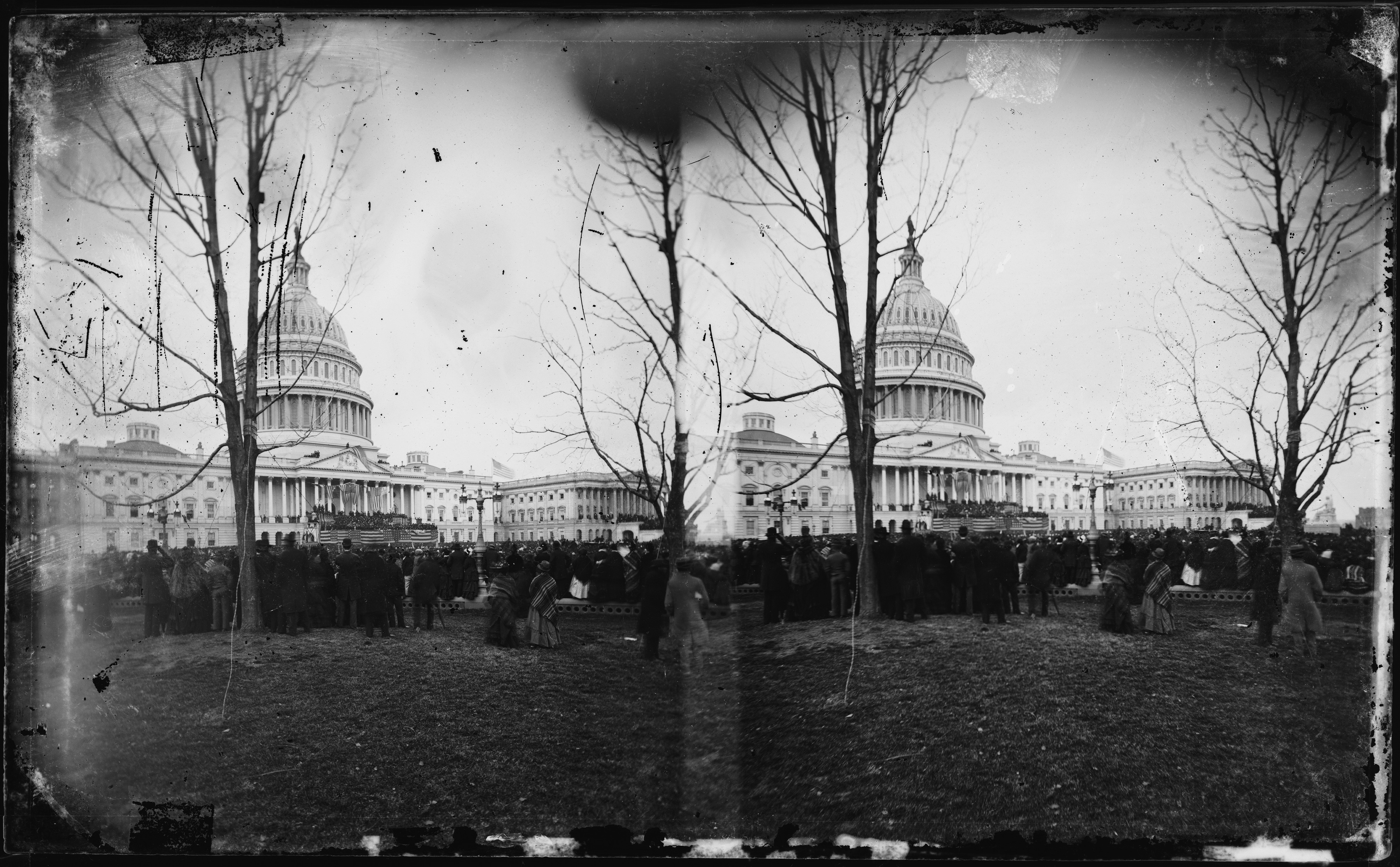
- United States Capitol (1877)

Overview
- Legislative body: United States Congress
- Jurisdiction: United States
- Term: March 4, 1879 – March 4, 1881

Senate
- Members: 76
- President: William A. Wheeler (R)
- President pro tempore: Allen G. Thurman (D)
- Party control: Democratic

House of Representatives
- Members: 293 representatives 8 non-voting delegates
- Speaker: Samuel J. Randall (D)
- Party control: Democratic (through coalition)

Sessions
- 1st: March 18, 1879 – July 1, 1879
- 2nd: December 1, 1879 – June 16, 1880
- 3rd: December 6, 1880 – March 3, 1881

The 46th United States Congress was a meeting of the legislative branch of the United States federal government, consisting of the United States Senate and the United States House of Representatives. It met in Washington, D.C. from March 4, 1879, to March 4, 1881, during the last two years of Rutherford Hayes's presidency.

The apportionment of seats in this House of Representatives was based on the 1870 United States census. The Senate had a Democratic majority, while the House of Representatives had a Democratic plurality. The Democrats were still able to control the House, however, with the help of the Independent politicians who caucused with them.

== Party summary ==
=== Senate ===
	Party (shading shows control)					Total	Vacant
	Anti- Monopoly (AM)	Democratic (D)	Republican (R)	Independent (I)	Other	Total	Vacant
End of previous congress	1	36	38	1	0	76	0
Begin	1	42	31	1	0	75	1
End	1	42	31	1	0	75	1
Final voting share	1.3%	56.0%	41.3%	1.3%	0.0%		
Beginning of next congress	0	37	36	1	1 (Note: Readjuster)	75	1

=== House of Representatives ===
	Party (shading shows control)					Total	Vacant
	Democratic (D)	Independent Democratic (ID)	Independent (I)	Greenback (GB)	Republican (R)	Total	Vacant
End of previous congress	154	1	0	0	136	291	2
Begin	141	6	0	13	131	291	2
End	143	6	0	13	129	291	2
Final voting share	49.1%	2.1%	0.0%	4.5%	44.3%		
Beginning of next congress	128	1	1	10	151	291	0

== Leadership ==
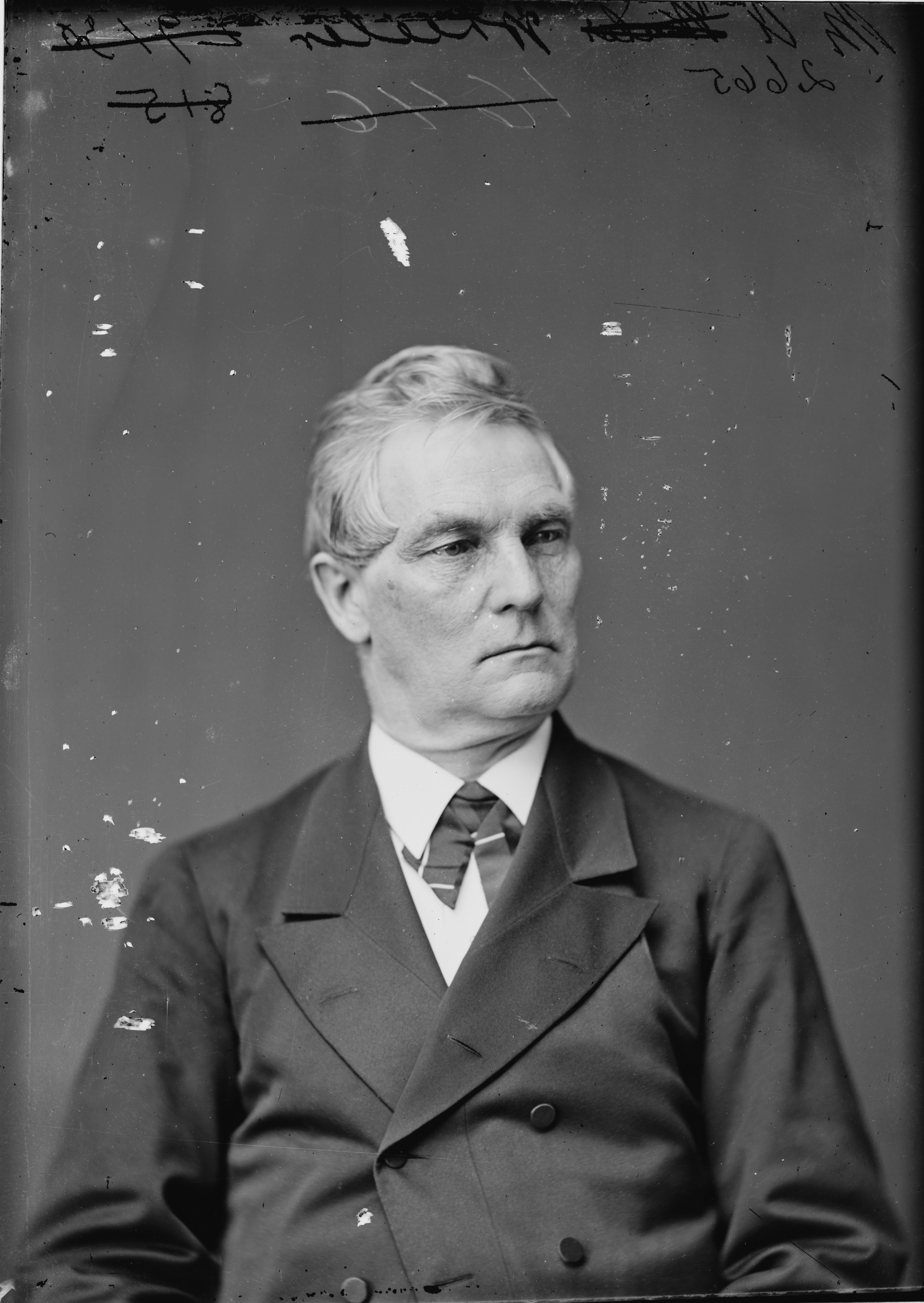
President of the Senate William A. Wheeler

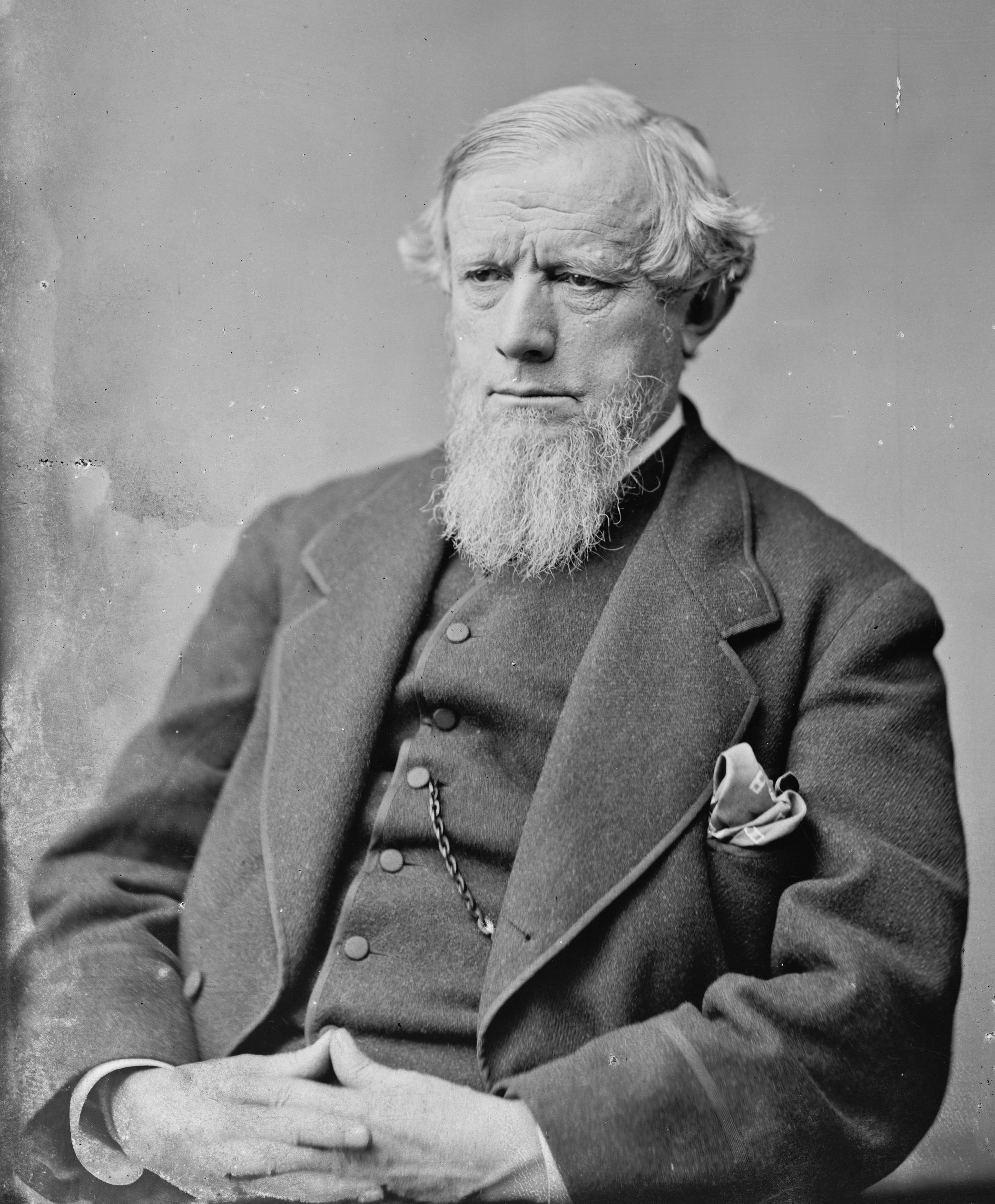
Senate President pro tempore Allen G. Thurman

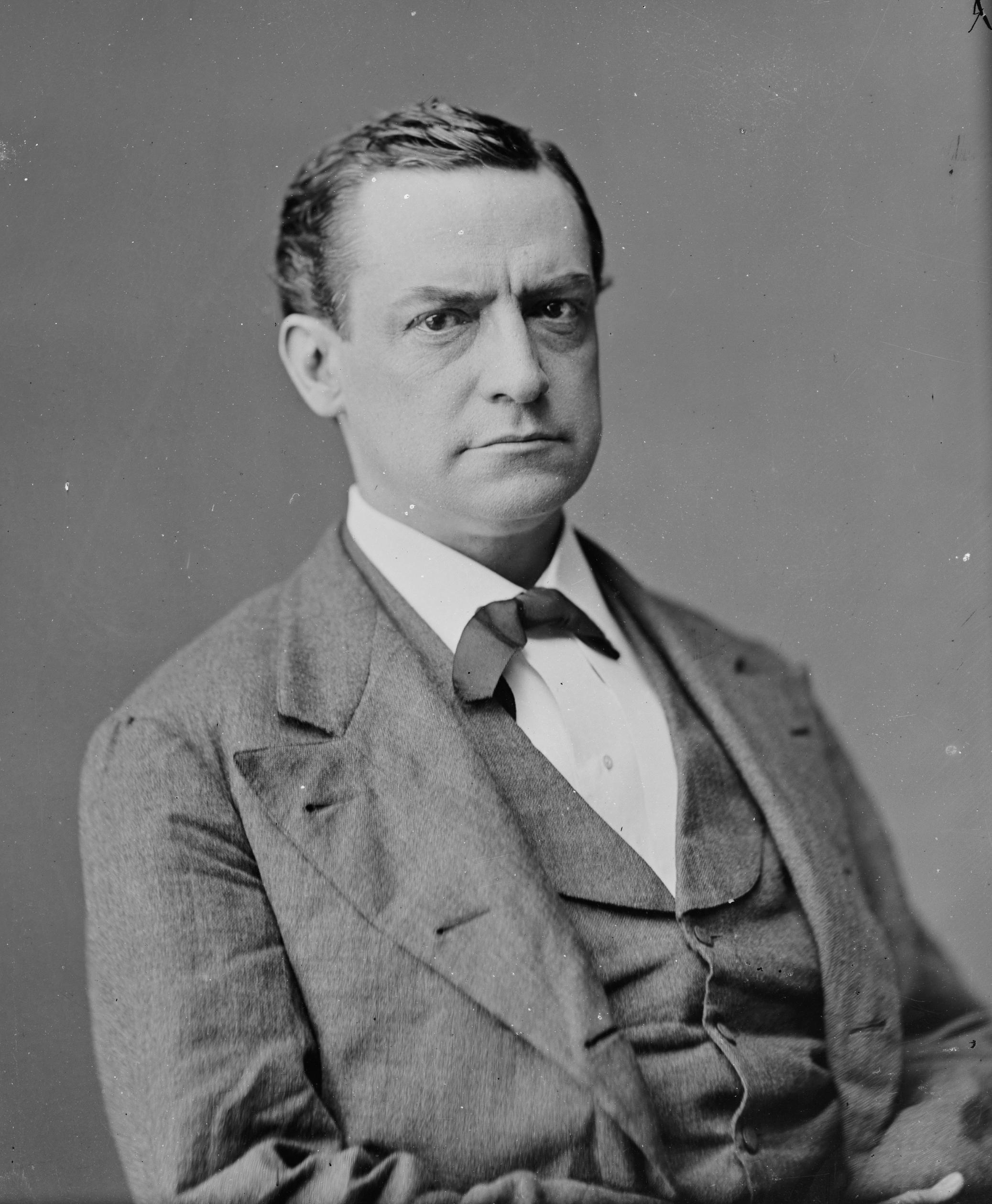
House Speaker Samuel J. Randall

=== Senate ===
- President: William A. Wheeler (R)
- President pro tempore: Allen G. Thurman (D)
- Democratic Caucus Chairman: William A. Wallace
- Republican Conference Chairman: Henry B. Anthony

=== House of Representatives ===
- Speaker: Samuel J. Randall (D)
- Democratic Caucus Chairman: John Ford House
- Republican Conference Chairman: William P. Frye

== Major events ==
- Depression of 1873–79
- March 18, 1879: Samuel J. Randall was elected in one of the most tightly fought contests for the speakership after the Civil War. Randall, who favored the protective tariff and "hard money," drew his greatest strength from northern cities and greatest opposition from the west and south. The midterm elections of 1878 had gone badly for the Democrats, with the Greenback Party making inroads in key districts. This emboldened Randall's opponents, who rallied to the support of Joseph Blackburn from Kentucky. In the end, Randall prevailed in the Democratic caucus to receive the nomination, with 75 votes to Blackburn's 57 and a scattering of 9 votes to three other candidates. Blackburn, in moving to make Randall's nomination unanimous, steered his supporters away from the nomination of Hendrick B. Wright, a Democrat from Pennsylvania who was nominated by the Greenbacks. In the eventual vote in the House to elect the Speaker, Randall prevailed with 144 votes, to 125 for James Garfield (Republican from Ohio), 13 for Wright, and one for William "Pig Iron" Kelley (Pennsylvania).
- November 2, 1880: U.S. presidential election, 1880: James Garfield (R) defeated Winfield S. Hancock (D)
- February 19, 1881: Kansas became the first state to prohibit alcohol.

== Major legislation ==
- [data missing]

== Members ==
This list is arranged by chamber, then by state. Senators are listed by class, and representatives are listed by district.

Skip to House of Representatives, below

=== Senate ===
Preceding the names in the list below are Senate class numbers, which indicate the cycle of their election. In this Congress, Class 1 meant their term ended with this Congress, requiring re-election in 1880; Class 2 meant their term began in the last Congress, requiring re-election in 1882; and Class 3 meant their term began in this Congress, requiring re-election in 1884.

==== Alabama ====
▌2. John T. Morgan (D)
▌3. George S. Houston (D), until December 31, 1879

▌Luke Pryor (D), January 7, 1880 - November 23, 1880
▌James L. Pugh (D), from November 24, 1880

==== Arkansas ====
▌2. Augustus Garland (D)
▌3. James D. Walker (D)

==== California ====
▌1. Newton Booth (AM)
▌3. James T. Farley (D)

==== Colorado ====
▌2. Henry M. Teller (R)
▌3. Nathaniel P. Hill (R)

==== Connecticut ====
▌1. William W. Eaton (D)
▌3. Orville H. Platt (R)

==== Delaware ====
▌1. Thomas Bayard Sr. (D)
▌2. Eli Saulsbury (D)

==== Florida ====
▌1. Charles W. Jones (D)
▌3. Wilkinson Call (D)

==== Georgia ====
▌2. Benjamin Hill (D)
▌3. John B. Gordon (D), until May 26, 1880

▌Joseph E. Brown (D), from May 26, 1880

==== Illinois ====
▌2. David Davis (I)
▌3. John A. Logan (R)

==== Indiana ====
▌1. Joseph E. McDonald (D)
▌3. Daniel W. Voorhees (D)

==== Iowa ====
▌2. Samuel J. Kirkwood (R)
▌3. William B. Allison (R)

==== Kansas ====
▌2. Preston B. Plumb (R)
▌3. John J. Ingalls (R)

==== Kentucky ====
▌2. James B. Beck (D)
▌3. John S. Williams (D)

==== Louisiana ====
▌2. William Pitt Kellogg (R)
▌3. Benjamin F. Jonas (D)

==== Maine ====
▌1. Hannibal Hamlin (R)
▌2. James G. Blaine (R)

==== Maryland ====
▌1. William Pinkney Whyte (D)
▌3. James B. Groome (D)

==== Massachusetts ====
▌1. Henry L. Dawes (R)
▌2. George F. Hoar (R)

==== Michigan ====
▌1. Zachariah Chandler (R), until November 1, 1879

▌Henry P. Baldwin (R), from November 17, 1879

▌2. Thomas W. Ferry (R)

==== Minnesota ====
▌1. Samuel J. R. McMillan (R)
▌2. William Windom (R)

==== Mississippi ====
▌1. Blanche Bruce (R)
▌2. Lucius Q. C. Lamar (D)

==== Missouri ====
▌1. Francis Cockrell (D)
▌3. George G. Vest (D)

==== Nebraska ====
▌1. Algernon Paddock (R)
▌2. Alvin Saunders (R)

==== Nevada ====
▌1. William Sharon (R)
▌3. John P. Jones (R)

==== New Hampshire ====
▌2. Edward H. Rollins (R)
▌3. Charles Bell (R), March 13, 1879 - June 18, 1879

▌Henry W. Blair (R), from June 18, 1879

==== New Jersey ====
▌1. Theodore Randolph (D)
▌2. John R. McPherson (D)

==== New York ====
▌1. Francis Kernan (D)
▌3. Roscoe Conkling (R)

==== North Carolina ====
▌2. Matt W. Ransom (D)
▌3. Zebulon B. Vance (D)

==== Ohio ====
▌1. Allen G. Thurman (D)
▌3. George H. Pendleton (D)

==== Oregon ====
▌2. La Fayette Grover (D)
▌3. James H. Slater (D)

==== Pennsylvania ====
▌1. William A. Wallace (D)
▌3. J. Donald Cameron (R)

==== Rhode Island ====
▌1. Ambrose Burnside (R)
▌2. Henry B. Anthony (R)

==== South Carolina ====
▌2. Matthew C. Butler (D)
▌3. Wade Hampton III (D)

==== Tennessee ====
▌1. James E. Bailey (D)
▌2. Isham G. Harris (D)

==== Texas ====
▌1. Samuel B. Maxey (D)
▌2. Richard Coke (D)

==== Vermont ====
▌1. George F. Edmunds (R)
▌3. Justin Morrill (R)

==== Virginia ====
▌1. Robert E. Withers (D)
▌2. John W. Johnston (D)

==== West Virginia ====
▌1. Frank Hereford (D)
▌2. Henry G. Davis (D)

==== Wisconsin ====
▌1. Angus Cameron (R)
▌3. Matthew H. Carpenter (R), until February 24, 1881

Senators' party membership by state at the opening of the 46th Congress in March 1879. The green stripes in California represent Newton Booth of the Anti-Monopoly Party, while the gray stripes in Illinois represent independent David Davis. 2 Democrats 1 Democrat and 1 Republican 2 Republicans Territories

=== House of Representatives ===
The names of representatives are preceded by their district numbers.

==== Alabama ====
▌1. Thomas H. Herndon (D)
▌2. Hilary A. Herbert (D)
▌3. William J. Samford (D)
▌4. Charles M. Shelley (D)
▌5. Thomas Williams (D)
▌6. Burwell Lewis (D), until October 1, 1880

▌Newton N. Clements (D), from December 8, 1880

▌7. William H. Forney (D)
▌8. William M. Lowe (GB)

==== Arkansas ====
▌1. Poindexter Dunn (D)
▌2. William F. Slemons (D)
▌3. Jordan E. Cravens (D)
▌4. Thomas M. Gunter (D)

==== California ====
▌1. Horace Davis (R)
▌2. Horace F. Page (R)
▌3. Campbell P. Berry (D)
▌4. Romualdo Pacheco (R)

==== Colorado ====
▌At-large. James B. Belford (R)

==== Connecticut ====
▌1. Joseph R. Hawley (R)
▌2. James Phelps (D)
▌3. John T. Wait (R)
▌4. Frederick Miles (R)

==== Delaware ====
▌At-large. Edward L. Martin (D)

==== Florida ====
▌1. Robert H. M. Davidson (D)
▌2. Noble A. Hull (D), until January 22, 1881

▌Horatio Bisbee Jr. (R), from January 22, 1881

==== Georgia ====
▌1. John C. Nicholls (D)
▌2. William E. Smith (D)
▌3. Philip Cook (D)
▌4. Henry Persons (ID)
▌5. Nathaniel J. Hammond (D)
▌6. James Blount (D)
▌7. William Felton (D)
▌8. Alexander H. Stephens (D)
▌9. Emory Speer (ID)

==== Illinois ====
▌1. William Aldrich (R)
▌2. George R. Davis (R)
▌3. Hiram Barber Jr. (R)
▌4. John C. Sherwin (R)
▌5. Robert M. A. Hawk (R)
▌6. Thomas J. Henderson (R)
▌7. Philip C. Hayes (R)
▌8. Greenbury L. Fort (R)
▌9. Thomas A. Boyd (R)
▌10. Benjamin F. Marsh (R)
▌11. James W. Singleton (D)
▌12. William M. Springer (D)
▌13. Adlai E. Stevenson (D)
▌14. Joseph G. Cannon (R)
▌15. Albert P. Forsythe (GB)
▌16. William A. J. Sparks (D)
▌17. William R. Morrison (D)
▌18. John R. Thomas (R)
▌19. Richard W. Townshend (D)

==== Indiana ====
▌1. William Heilman (R)
▌2. Thomas R. Cobb (D)
▌3. George A. Bicknell (D)
▌4. Jeptha D. New (D)
▌5. Thomas M. Browne (R)
▌6. William R. Myers (D)
▌7. Gilbert De La Matyr (GB)
▌8. Abraham J. Hostetler (D)
▌9. Godlove S. Orth (R)
▌10. William H. Calkins (R)
▌11. Calvin Cowgill (R)
▌12. Walpole G. Colerick (D)
▌13. John Baker (R)

==== Iowa ====
▌1. Moses A. McCoid (R)
▌2. Hiram Price (R)
▌3. Thomas Updegraff (R)
▌4. Nathaniel C. Deering (R)
▌5. Rush Clark (R), until April 29, 1879

▌William G. Thompson (R), from December 1, 1879

▌6. James B. Weaver (GB)
▌7. Edward H. Gillette (GB)
▌8. William F. Sapp (R)
▌9. Cyrus C. Carpenter (R)

==== Kansas ====
▌1. John A. Anderson (R)
▌2. Dudley C. Haskell (R)
▌3. Thomas Ryan (R)

==== Kentucky ====
▌1. Oscar Turner (ID)
▌2. James A. McKenzie (D)
▌3. John William Caldwell (D)
▌4. J. Proctor Knott (D)
▌5. Albert S. Willis (D)
▌6. John G. Carlisle (D)
▌7. Joseph C. S. Blackburn (D)
▌8. Philip B. Thompson Jr. (D)
▌9. Thomas Turner (D)
▌10. Elijah C. Phister (D)

==== Louisiana ====
▌1. Randall L. Gibson (D)
▌2. E. John Ellis (D)
▌3. Joseph H. Acklen (D)
▌4. Joseph B. Elam (D)
▌5. J. Floyd King (D)
▌6. Edward W. Robertson (D)

==== Maine ====
▌1. Thomas B. Reed (R)
▌2. William P. Frye (R)
▌3. Stephen D. Lindsey (R)
▌4. George W. Ladd (GB)
▌5. Thompson H. Murch (GB)

==== Maryland ====
▌1. Daniel M. Henry (D)
▌2. J. Frederick C. Talbott (D)
▌3. William Kimmel (D)
▌4. Robert M. McLane (D)
▌5. Eli J. Henkle (D)
▌6. Milton G. Urner (R)

==== Massachusetts ====
▌1. William W. Crapo (R)
▌2. Benjamin W. Harris (R)
▌3. Walbridge A. Field (R)
▌4. Leopold Morse (D)
▌5. Selwyn Z. Bowman (R)
▌6. George B. Loring (R)
▌7. William A. Russell (R)
▌8. William Claflin (R)
▌9. William W. Rice (R)
▌10. Amasa Norcross (R)
▌11. George D. Robinson (R)

==== Michigan ====
▌1. John Newberry (R)
▌2. Edwin Willits (R)
▌3. Jonas H. McGowan (R)
▌4. Julius C. Burrows (R)
▌5. John W. Stone (R)
▌6. Mark S. Brewer (R)
▌7. Omar D. Conger (R), until March 3, 1881
▌8. Roswell G. Horr (R)
▌9. Jay Hubbell (R)

==== Minnesota ====
▌1. Mark H. Dunnell (R)
▌2. Henry Poehler (D)
▌3. William D. Washburn (R)

==== Mississippi ====
▌1. Henry L. Muldrow (D)
▌2. Vannoy Manning (D)
▌3. Hernando Money (D)
▌4. Otho R. Singleton (D)
▌5. Charles E. Hooker (D)
▌6. James Chalmers (D)

==== Missouri ====
▌1. Martin L. Clardy (D)
▌2. Erastus Wells (D)
▌3. Richard G. Frost (D)
▌4. Lowndes H. Davis (D)
▌5. Richard P. Bland (D)
▌6. James R. Waddill (D)
▌7. Alfred M. Lay (D), until December 8, 1879

▌John F. Philips (D), from January 10, 1880

▌8. Samuel L. Sawyer (ID)
▌9. Nicholas Ford (GB)
▌10. Gideon F. Rothwell (D)
▌11. John B. Clark Jr. (D)
▌12. William H. Hatch (D)
▌13. Aylett H. Buckner (D)

==== Nebraska ====
▌At-large. Edward K. Valentine (R)

==== Nevada ====
▌At-large. Rollin M. Daggett (R)

==== New Hampshire ====
▌1. Joshua G. Hall (R)
▌2. James F. Briggs (R)
▌3. Evarts Farr (R), until November 30, 1880

▌Ossian Ray (R), from January 8, 1881

==== New Jersey ====
▌1. George M. Robeson (R)
▌2. Hezekiah Smith (D)
▌3. Miles Ross (D)
▌4. Alvah A. Clark (D)
▌5. Charles H. Voorhis (R)
▌6. John L. Blake (R)
▌7. Lewis A. Brigham (R)

==== New York ====
▌1. James W. Covert (D)
▌2. Daniel O'Reilly (ID)
▌3. Simeon B. Chittenden (R)
▌4. Archibald M. Bliss (D)
▌5. Nicholas Muller (D)
▌6. Samuel S. Cox (D)
▌7. Edwin Einstein (R)
▌8. Anson G. McCook (R)
▌9. Fernando Wood (D), until February 14, 1881
▌10. James O'Brien (ID)
▌11. Levi P. Morton (R)
▌12. Waldo Hutchins (D), from November 4, 1879
▌13. John H. Ketcham (R)
▌14. John W. Ferdon (R)
▌15. William Lounsbery (D)
▌16. John M. Bailey (R)
▌17. Walter A. Wood (R)
▌18. John Hammond (R)
▌19. Amaziah B. James (R)
▌20. John H. Starin (R)
▌21. David Wilber (R)
▌22. Warner Miller (R)
▌23. Cyrus D. Prescott (R)
▌24. Joseph Mason (R)
▌25. Frank Hiscock (R)
▌26. John H. Camp (R)
▌27. Elbridge G. Lapham (R)
▌28. Jeremiah W. Dwight (R)
▌29. David P. Richardson (R)
▌30. John Van Voorhis (R)
▌31. Richard Crowley (R)
▌32. Ray V. Pierce (R), until September 18, 1880

▌Jonathan Scoville (D), from November 12, 1880

▌33. Henry H. Van Aernam (R)

==== North Carolina ====
▌1. Joseph Martin (R), until January 29, 1881

▌Jesse J. Yeates (D), from January 29, 1881

▌2. William H. Kitchin (D)
▌3. Daniel Russell (GB)
▌4. Joseph J. Davis (D)
▌5. Alfred M. Scales (D)
▌6. Walter L. Steele (D)
▌7. Robert F. Armfield (D)
▌8. Robert B. Vance (D)

==== Ohio ====
▌1. Benjamin Butterworth (R)
▌2. Thomas L. Young (R)
▌3. John A. McMahon (D)
▌4. J. Warren Keifer (R)
▌5. Benjamin Le Fevre (D)
▌6. William D. Hill (D)
▌7. Frank H. Hurd (D)
▌8. Ebenezer B. Finley (D)
▌9. George L. Converse (D)
▌10. Thomas Ewing Jr. (D)
▌11. Henry L. Dickey (D)
▌12. Henry S. Neal (R)
▌13. Adoniram J. Warner (D)
▌14. Gibson Atherton (D)
▌15. George W. Geddes (D)
▌16. William McKinley (R)
▌17. James Monroe (R)
▌18. Jonathan T. Updegraff (R)
▌19. James A. Garfield (R), until November 8, 1880

▌Ezra B. Taylor (R), from December 13, 1880

▌20. Amos Townsend (R)

==== Oregon ====
▌At-large. John Whiteaker (D)

==== Pennsylvania ====
▌1. Henry H. Bingham (R)
▌2. Charles O'Neill (R)
▌3. Samuel J. Randall (D)
▌4. William D. Kelley (R)
▌5. Alfred C. Harmer (R)
▌6. William Ward (R)
▌7. William Godshalk (R)
▌8. Hiester Clymer (D)
▌9. A. Herr Smith (R)
▌10. Reuben Bachman (D)
▌11. Robert Klotz (D)
▌12. Hendrick B. Wright (GB)
▌13. John Ryon (D)
▌14. John W. Killinger (R)
▌15. Edward Overton Jr. (R)
▌16. John I. Mitchell (R)
▌17. Alexander H. Coffroth (D)
▌18. Horatio G. Fisher (R)
▌19. Frank E. Beltzhoover (D)
▌20. Seth Yocum (GB)
▌21. Morgan R. Wise (D)
▌22. Russell Errett (R)
▌23. Thomas M. Bayne (R)
▌24. William S. Shallenberger (R)
▌25. Harry White (R)
▌26. Samuel Dick (R)
▌27. James H. Osmer (R)

==== Rhode Island ====
▌1. Nelson W. Aldrich (R)
▌2. Latimer W. Ballou (R)

==== South Carolina ====
▌1. John S. Richardson (D)
▌2. Michael P. O'Connor (D)
▌3. D. Wyatt Aiken (D)
▌4. John H. Evins (D)
▌5. George D. Tillman (D)

==== Tennessee ====
▌1. Robert L. Taylor (D)
▌2. Leonidas C. Houk (R)
▌3. George G. Dibrell (D)
▌4. Benton McMillin (D)
▌5. John M. Bright (D)
▌6. John F. House (D)
▌7. Washington C. Whitthorne (D)
▌8. John D. C. Atkins (D)
▌9. Charles B. Simonton (D)
▌10. H. Casey Young (D)

==== Texas ====
▌1. John H. Reagan (D)
▌2. David B. Culberson (D)
▌3. Olin Wellborn (D)
▌4. Roger Q. Mills (D)
▌5. George W. Jones (GB)
▌6. Christopher C. Upson (D), from April 15, 1879

==== Vermont ====
▌1. Charles H. Joyce (R)
▌2. James M. Tyler (R)
▌3. Bradley Barlow (GB)

==== Virginia ====
▌1. Richard Lee T. Beale (D)
▌2. John Goode Jr. (D)
▌3. Joseph E. Johnston (D)
▌4. Joseph Jorgensen (R)
▌5. George Cabell (D)
▌6. John R. Tucker (D)
▌7. John T. Harris (D)
▌8. Eppa Hutton II (D)
▌9. James Richmond (D)

==== West Virginia ====
▌1. Benjamin Wilson (D)
▌2. Benjamin F. Martin (D)
▌3. John E. Kenna (D)

==== Wisconsin ====
▌1. Charles G. Williams (R)
▌2. Lucien B. Caswell (R)
▌3. George Hazelton (R)
▌4. Peter V. Deuster (D)
▌5. Edward S. Bragg (D)
▌6. Gabriel Bouck (D)
▌7. Herman L. Humphrey (R)
▌8. Thaddeus C. Pound (R)

==== Non-voting delegates ====
▌Arizona Territory. John G. Campbell (D)
▌Dakota Territory. Granville G. Bennett (R)
▌Idaho Territory. George Ainslie (D)
▌Montana Territory. Martin Maginnis (D)
▌New Mexico Territory. Mariano S. Otero (R)
▌Utah Territory. George Q. Cannon (R)
▌Washington Territory. Thomas H. Brents (R)
▌Wyoming Territory. Stephen Downey (R)

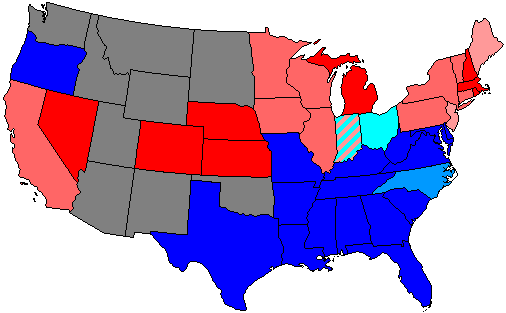
House seats by party holding plurality in state: 80+% to 100% Democratic / 80+% to 100% Republican; 60+% to 80% Democratic / 60+% to 80% Republican; Up to 60% Democratic / Up to 60% Republican

== Changes in membership ==
The count below reflects changes from the beginning of the first session of this Congress.

=== Senate ===
- Replacements: 4
  - Democratic: no net change
  - Republican: no net change
- Deaths: 3
- Resignations: 1
- Interim appointments: 2
- Total seats with changes: 5

Senate changes
State (class)	Vacated by	Reason for change	Successor	Date of successor's formal installation (Note: When seated or oath administered, not necessarily when service began.)
New Hampshire (3)	Vacant	Legislature had failed to elect. An interim successor was appointed March 13, 1879.	Charles H. Bell (R)	March 13, 1879
New Hampshire (3)	Charles H. Bell (R)	Successor elected June 18, 1879, but did not begin service until June 20, 1879, for unknown reasons.	Henry W. Blair (R)	June 20, 1879
Michigan (1)	Zachariah Chandler (R)	Died November 1, 1879. Successor appointed November 17, 1879, to continue the term. Appointee was elected January 19, 1881, to finish the term.	Henry P. Baldwin (R)	November 17, 1879
Alabama (3)	George S. Houston (D)	Died December 31, 1879. Successor appointed January 7, 1880, to continue the term.	Luke Pryor (D)	January 7, 1880
Georgia (3)	John B. Gordon (D)	Resigned May 26, 1880, to promote building of the Georgia Pacific Railway. Successor elected May 26, 1880.	Joseph E. Brown (D)	May 26, 1880
Alabama (3)	Luke Pryor (D)	Successor elected November 23, 1880.	James L. Pugh (D)	November 24, 1880
Wisconsin (3)	Matthew H. Carpenter (R)	Died February 24, 1881.	Vacant	Not filled this term

=== House of Representatives ===
- Replacements: 8
  - Democratic: 1 seat net gain
  - Republican: 1 seat net loss
- Deaths: 4
- Resignations: 3
- Contested election: 2
- Total seats with changes: 11

House changes
District	Vacated by	Reason for change	Successor	Date of successor's formal installation
Texas 6	Vacant	Rep. Gustav Schleicher died during previous congress	Christopher C. Upson (D)	April 15, 1879
New York 12	Vacant	Rep.-elect Alexander Smith died during previous congress	Waldo Hutchins (D)	November 4, 1879
Iowa 5	Rush Clark (R)	Died April 29, 1879	William G. Thompson (R)	October 14, 1879
Missouri 7	Alfred M. Lay (D)	Died December 8, 1879	John F. Philips (D)	January 10, 1880
New York 32	Ray V. Pierce (R)	Resigned September 18, 1880	Jonathan Scoville (D)	November 12, 1880
Alabama 6	Burwell B. Lewis (D)	Resigned October 1, 1880, to accept presidency of the University of Alabama	Newton N. Clements (D)	December 8, 1880
Ohio 19	James A. Garfield (R)	Resigned November 8, 1880	Ezra B. Taylor (R)	December 13, 1880
New Hampshire 3	Evarts W. Farr (R)	Died November 30, 1880. Successor elected December 28, 1880.	Ossian Ray (R)	January 8, 1881
Florida 2	Noble A. Hull (D)	Lost contested election January 22, 1881	Horatio Bisbee Jr. (R)	January 22, 1881
North Carolina 1	Joseph J. Martin (R)	Lost contested election January 29, 1881	Jesse J. Yeates (D)	January 29, 1881
New York 9	Fernando Wood (D)	Died February 14, 1881	Vacant	Not filled this term
Michigan 7	Omar D. Conger (R)	Resigned March 3, 1881, after being elected to the US Senate	Vacant	Not filled this term

== Committees ==
Lists of committees and their party leaders for members of the House and Senate committees can be found through the Official Congressional Directory at the bottom of this article. The directory after the pages of terms of service lists committees of the Senate, House (Standing with Subcommittees, Select and Special) and Joint and, after that, House/Senate committee assignments. On the committees section of the House and Senate in the Official Congressional Directory, the committee's members on the first row on the left side shows the chairman of the committee and on the right side shows the ranking member of the committee.

=== Senate ===
- Additional Accommodations for the Library of Congress (Select)
- Agriculture (Chairman: John W. Johnston; Ranking Member: Algernon S. Paddock)
- Appropriations (Chairman: Henry G. Davis; Ranking Member: William Windom)
- Audit and Control the Contingent Expenses of the Senate (Chairman: Benjamin H. Hill; Ranking Member: John P. Jones)
- Cabinet Officers on the Floor of the Senate (Select)
- Civil Service and Retrenchment (Chairman: Matthew C. Butler; Ranking Member: Henry M. Teller)
- Claims (Chairman: Francis M. Cockrell; Ranking Member: Samuel J.R. McMillan)
- Commerce (Chairman: Matt W. Ransom; Ranking Member: Roscoe Conkling)
- Distributing Public Revenue Among the States (Select)
- District of Columbia (Chairman: Isham G. Harris; Ranking Member: John J. Ingalls)
- Education and Labor (Chairman: James E. Bailey; Ranking Member: Ambrose E. Burnside)
- Elections of 1878 (Select)
- Emigration of Negroes from the South to North (Select)
- Engrossed Bills (Chairman: Roscoe Conkling; Ranking Member: Robert E. Withers)
- Enrolled Bills (Chairman: Zebulon B. Vance; Ranking Member: Edward H. Rollins)
- Epidemic Diseases (Select) (Chairman: Isham G. Harris; Ranking Member: Algernon S. Paddock)
- Examine the Several Branches in the Civil Service (Chairman: George G. Vest; Ranking Member: John A. Logan)
- Finance (Chairman: Thomas F. Bayard; Ranking Member: Justin S. Morrill)
- Foreign Relations (Chairman: William W. Eaton; Ranking Member: Hannibal Hamlin)
- Freedman's Savings and Trust Company (Select)
- Indian Affairs (Chairman: Richard Coke; Ranking Member: William B. Allison)
- Indian Territory (Select)
- Judiciary (Chairman: Allen G. Thurman; Ranking Member: David Davis)
- Manufactures (Chairman: La Fayette Grover; Ranking Member: Edward H. Rollins)
- Military Affairs (Chairman: Theodore F. Randolph; Ranking Member: Ambrose E. Burnside)
- Mines and Mining (Chairman: Frank Hereford; Ranking Member: J. Donald Cameron)
- Mississippi River and its Tributaries (Select) (Chairman: Benjamin F. Jonas; Ranking Member: James G. Blaine)
- Naval Affairs (Chairman: John R. McPherson; Ranking Member: Henry B. Anthony)
- Nicaraguan Claims (Select)
- Ordnance and War Ships (Select)
- Patents (Chairman: Francis Kernan; Ranking Member: Newton Booth)
- Pensions (Chairman: Robert E. Withers; Ranking Member: John J. Ingalls)
- Plueropneumonia among Animals (Select)
- Post Office and Post Roads (Chairman: Samuel B. Maxey; Ranking Member: James B. Groome)
- Private Land Claims (Chairman: George F. Edmunds; Ranking Member: David Davis)
- Privileges and Elections (Chairman: Eli Saulsbury; Ranking Member: Zebulon B. Vance)
- Public Lands (Chairman: Joseph E. McDonald; Ranking Member: Preston B. Plumb)
- Railroads (Chairman: Lucius Quintus Cincinnatus Lamar II; Ranking Member: Benjamin F. Jonas)
- Revision of the Laws (Chairman: William A. Wallace; Ranking Member: George F. Hoar)
- Revolutionary Claims (Chairman: Henry B. Anthony; Ranking Member: Charles W. Jones)
- Rules (Chairman: John Tyler Morgan; Ranking Member: James G. Blaine)
- Tariff Regulation (Select)
- Tenth Census (Select) (Chairman: George H. Pendleton; Ranking Member: David Davis)
- Territories (Chairman: Augustus H. Garland; Ranking Member: Alvin Saunders)
- Transportation Routes to the Seaboard (Select) (Chairman: James B. Beck; Ranking Member: J. Donald Cameron)
- Treasury Department Account Discrepancies (Select)
- Whole

=== House of Representatives ===
- Accounts (Chairman: Daniel M. Henry; Ranking Member: Thomas A. Boyd)
- Alcoholic Liquor Traffic (Select) (Chairman: Lowndes H. Davis; Ranking Member: Mark S. Brewer)
- Agriculture (Chairman: James W. Covert; Ranking Member: William H. Hatch)
- Appropriations (Chairman: John DeWitt Clinton Atkins; Ranking Member: John H. Baker)
- Banking and Currency (Chairman: Aylett H. Buckner; Ranking Member: George W. Ladd)
- Claims (Chairman: John M. Bright; Ranking Member: William J. Samford)
- Coinage, Weights and Measures (Chairman: Alexander H. Stephens; Ranking Member: Gilbert De La Matyr)
- Commerce (Chairman: John H. Reagan; Ranking Member: Peter V. Deuster)
- District of Columbia (Chairman: Eppa Hunton; Ranking Member: William Heilman)
- Education and Labor (Chairman: John Goode; Ranking Member: James H. Osmer)
- Elections (Chairman: William M. Springer; Ranking Member: J. Warren Keifer)
- Enrolled Bills (Chairman: John E. Kenna; Ranking Member: David F. Wilber)
- Expenditures in the Interior Department (Chairman: Nicholas Muller; Ranking Member: Gilbert De La Matyr)
- Expenditures in the Justice Department (Chairman: James H. Blount; Ranking Member: Lowndes H. Davis)
- Expenditures in the Navy Department (Chairman: Richard W. Townshend; Ranking Member: Walter A. Wood)
- Expenditures in the Post Office Department (Chairman: George W. Ladd; Ranking Member: John L. Blake)
- Expenditures in the State Department (Chairman: Hiester Clymer; Ranking Member: John S. Newberry)
- Expenditures in the Treasury Department (Chairman: William H. Forney; Ranking Member: Charles O'Neill)
- Expenditures in the War Department (Chairman: Joseph C. S. Blackburn; Ranking Member: Harry White)
- Expenditures on Public Buildings (Chairman: Peter V. Deuster; Ranking Member: Nicholas Ford)
- Foreign Affairs (Chairman: Samuel S. Cox; Ranking Member: William D. Hill)
- Indian Affairs (Chairman: Alfred M. Scales; Ranking Member: Olin Wellborn)
- Invalid Pensions (Chairman: Alexander H. Coffroth; Ranking Member: Robert L. Taylor)
- Judiciary (Chairman: J. Proctor Knott; Ranking Member: Nathaniel J. Hammond)
- Levees and Improvements of the Mississippi River (Chairman: Edward W. Robertson; Ranking Member: Thomas M. Bayne)
- Manufactures (Chairman: Morgan R. Wise; Ranking Member: William M. Lowe)
- Mileage (Chairman: Thomas R. Cobb; Ranking Member: Simeon B. Chittenden)
- Military Affairs (Chairman: William A.J. Sparks; Ranking Member: Harry White)
- Militia (Chairman: Miles Ross; Ranking Member: Samuel B. Dick)
- Mines and Mining (Chairman: Adlai E. Stevenson; Ranking Member: John I. Mitchell)
- Naval Affairs (Chairman: Washington C. Whitthorne; Ranking Member: James O'Brien)
- Pacific Railroads (Chairman: Robert Milligan McLane; Ranking Member: Olin Wellborn)
- Patents (Chairman: Robert B. Vance; Ranking Member: Hezekiah B. Smith)
- Pensions (Chairman: John Whiteaker; Ranking Member: N/A)
- Post Office and Post Roads (Chairman: Hernando D. Money; Ranking Member: George Washington Jones)
- Private Land Claims (Chairman: Thomas M. Gunter; Ranking Member: John I. Mitchell)
- Public Buildings and Grounds (Chairman: Philip Cook; Ranking Member: Thompson H. Murch)
- Public Expenditures (Chairman: Ebenezer B. Finley; Ranking Member: Charles H. Joyce)
- Public Lands (Chairman: George L. Converse; Ranking Member: Thomas Ryan)
- Railways and Canals (Chairman: George C. Cabell; Ranking Member: Daniel O'Reilly)
- Revision of Laws (Chairman: John T. Harris; Ranking Member: William M. Lowe)
- Revolutionary Pensions (Chairman: John Whiteaker; Ranking Member: George L. Converse)
- Rules (Select) (Chairman: Samuel J. Randall; Ranking Member: James A. Garfield)
- Standards of Official Conduct
- Territories (Chairman: Henry L. Muldrow; Ranking Member: Reuben K. Bachman)
- War Claims (Chairman: Edward S. Bragg; Ranking Member: Cyrus C. Carpenter)
- Ways and Means (Chairman: Fernando Wood; Ranking Member: James A. Garfield)
- Whole

=== Joint committees ===
- Budget Control
- Conditions of Indian Tribes (Special)
- Census (Chairman: Rep. Samuel S. Cox; Vice Chairman: Rep. Gideon F. Rothwell)
- Enrolled Bills (Chairman: Rep. John E. Kenna; Vice Chairman: Rep. David F. Wilber)
- The Library (Chairman: Rep. George W. Geddes; Vice Chairman: Rep. William Claflin)
- Printing (Chairman: Rep. Otho R. Singleton; Vice Chairman: Rep. Philip C. Hayes)

== Caucuses ==
- Democratic (House)
- Democratic (Senate)

== Employees ==
=== Legislative branch agency directors ===
- Architect of the Capitol: Edward Clark
- Librarian of Congress: Ainsworth Rand Spofford
- Public Printer of the United States: John D. Defrees

=== Senate ===
- Secretary: George C. Gorham, until March 24, 1879
  - John C. Burch elected March 24, 1879
- Librarian: P. J. Pierce
- Sergeant at Arms: John R. French, until March 23, 1879
  - Richard J. Bright, elected March 23, 1879
- Chaplain: Byron Sunderland (Presbyterian), until March 24, 1879
  - Joseph J. Bullock (Presbyterian), elected March 24, 1879

=== House of Representatives ===
- Clerk: George M. Adams
- Sergeant at Arms: John G. Thompson
- Doorkeeper: Charles W. Field
- Postmaster: James M. Steuart
- Clerk at the Speaker's Table: J. Randolph Tucker Jr.
  - George P. Miller
  - Michael Sullivan
- Reading Clerks:
  - Thomas S. Pettit (D)
  - Neill S. Brown Jr. (R)
- Chaplain: W.P. Harrison (Methodist)

== See also ==
- 1878 United States elections (elections leading to this Congress)
  - 1878–79 United States Senate elections
  - 1878–79 United States House of Representatives elections
- 1880 United States elections (elections during this Congress, leading to the next Congress)
  - 1880 United States presidential election
  - 1880–81 United States Senate elections
  - 1880 United States House of Representatives elections
