= 1880 Missouri Secretary of State election =

- November 2, 1880

Nominee	Michael Knowles McGrath	James C. Broadwell	O. D. Jones
Party	Democratic	Republican	Greenback
Popular vote	208,308	153,560	35,253
Percentage	52.46%	38.67%	8.87%
Secretary of State before election
Michael Knowles McGrath
Democratic
Elected Secretary of State
Michael Knowles McGrath
Democratic

The 1880 Missouri Secretary of State election was held on November 2, 1880, in order to elect the secretary of state of Missouri. Democratic nominee and incumbent secretary of state Michael Knowles McGrath defeated Republican nominee James C. Broadwell and Greenback nominee O. D. Jones.

== General election ==
On election day, November 2, 1880, Democratic nominee Michael Knowles McGrath won re-election by a margin of 54,748 votes against his foremost opponent Republican nominee James C. Broadwell, thereby retaining Democratic control over the office of secretary of state. McGrath was sworn in for his third term on January 10, 1881.

=== Results ===
Missouri Secretary of State election, 1880
Party	Candidate	Votes	%
Democratic	Michael Knowles McGrath (incumbent)	208,308	52.46
Republican	James C. Broadwell	153,560	38.67
Greenback	O. D. Jones	35,253	8.87
Total votes		397,121	100.00
Democratic hold			

== See also ==
- 1880 Missouri gubernatorial election
