= Hosea W. Parker =

American politician (1833–1922)

Hosea Washington Parker
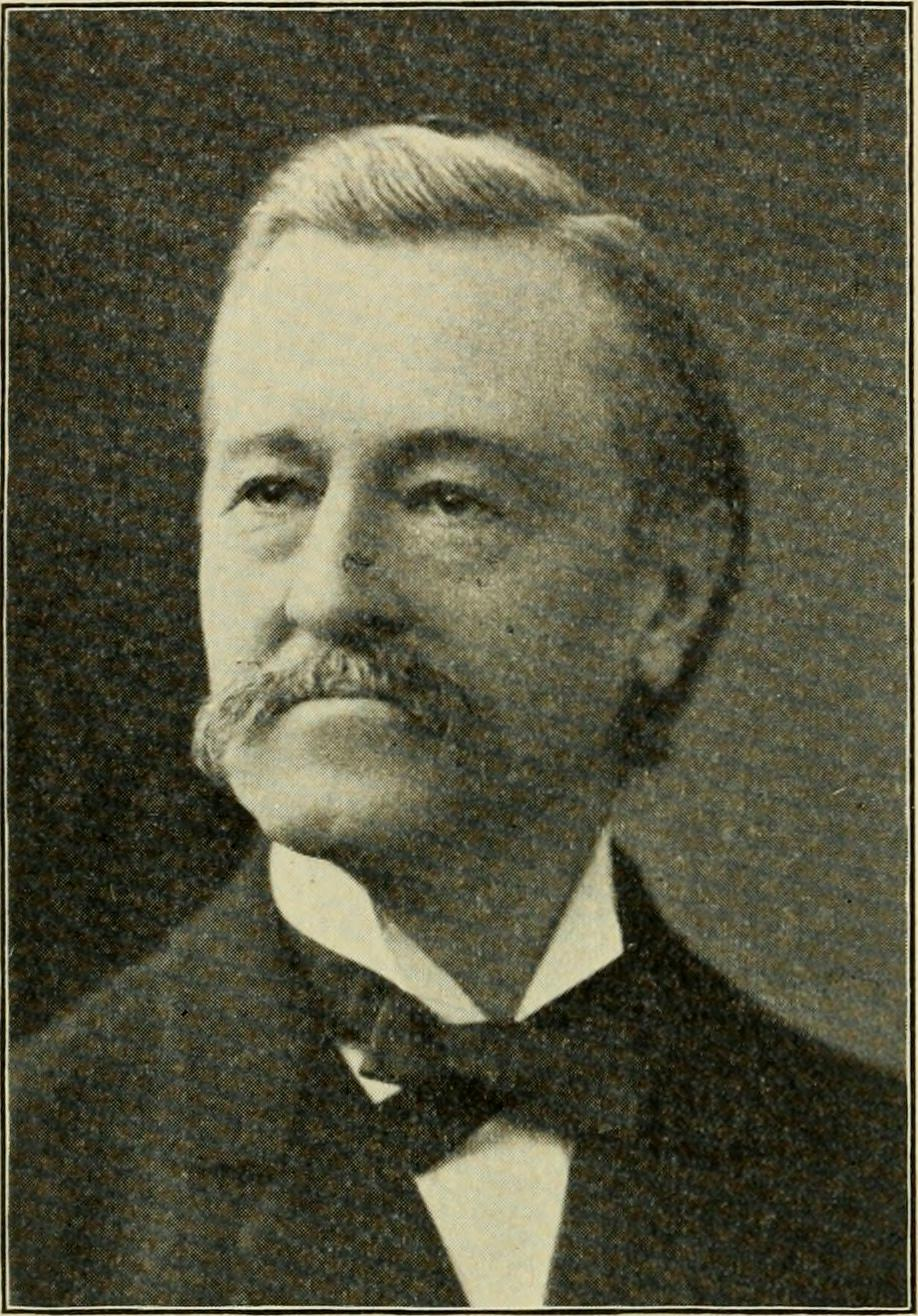

Member of the U.S. House of Representatives from New Hampshire's 3rd district
- In office March 4, 1871 – March 3, 1875
- Preceded by: Jacob Benton
- Succeeded by: Henry W. Blair

Member of the New Hampshire House of Representatives
- In office 1859–1860

Personal details
- Born: May 30, 1833 Lempster, New Hampshire, US
- Died: August 21, 1922 (aged 89) Claremont, New Hampshire, US
- Resting place: Mountain View Cemetery
- Profession: Lawyer

Hosea Washington Parker (May 30, 1833 – August 21, 1922) was a U.S. representative from New Hampshire.

== Biography ==
Born in Lempster, New Hampshire, Parker pursued classical studies. He attended Tufts College, Medford, Massachusetts, and was graduated from the Green Mountain Liberal Institute, South Woodstock, Vermont. He studied law and was admitted to the bar in 1859, commencing practice in Lempster.

He served as member of the New Hampshire House of Representatives in 1859 and 1860. He moved to Claremont, New Hampshire, in 1860, and served as delegate to the Democratic National Convention in 1868, 1880, 1884, and 1888.

Parker was elected as a Democrat to the Forty-second and Forty-third Congresses (March 4, 1871 – March 3, 1875). While in Washington, he was largely responsible for the refusal of patent extension resulting in the overthrow of the Sewing Machine monopoly. He was an unsuccessful candidate for reelection in 1874 to the Forty-fourth Congress. He resumed the practice of law and served as member of the State constitutional convention in 1918. He died in Claremont, New Hampshire, August 21, 1922, and was interred in Mountain View Cemetery.

U.S. House of Representatives
Preceded by Jacob Benton	U.S. Representative for the 3rd district of New Hampshire; March 4, 1871–March 3, 1875	Succeeded by Evarts Worcester Farr
