= 1880 Missouri State Auditor election =

- November 2, 1880

Nominee	John Walker	L. A. Thompson	A. C. Marquis
Party	Democratic	Republican	Greenback
Popular vote	208,484	152,563	34,665
Percentage	52.69%	38.55%	8.76%
State Auditor before election
Thomas Holloday
Democratic
Elected State Auditor
John Walker
Democratic

The 1880 Missouri State Auditor election was held on November 2, 1880, in order to elect the state auditor of Missouri. Democratic nominee John Walker defeated Republican nominee L. A. Thompson and Greenback nominee A. C. Marquis.

== General election ==
On election day, November 2, 1880, Democratic nominee John Walker won the election by a margin of 55,921 votes against his foremost opponent Republican nominee L. A. Thompson, thereby retaining Democratic control over the office of state auditor. Walker was sworn in as the 18th state auditor of Missouri on January 10, 1881.

=== Results ===
Missouri State Auditor election, 1880
Party	Candidate	Votes	%
Democratic	John Walker	208,484	52.69
Republican	L. A. Thompson	152,563	38.55
Greenback	A. C. Marquis	34,665	8.76
Total votes		395,712	100.00
Democratic hold			

== See also ==
- 1880 Missouri gubernatorial election
