= 1880 Missouri Attorney General election =

- November 2, 1880

Nominee	Daniel H. McIntyre	H. H. Harding	A. McGindley
Party	Democratic	Republican	Greenback
Popular vote	207,944	153,473	35,062
Percentage	52.45%	38.71%	8.84%
Attorney General before election
Jackson Leonidas Smith
Democratic
Elected Attorney General
Daniel H. McIntyre
Democratic

The 1880 Missouri Attorney General election was held on November 2, 1880, in order to elect the attorney general of Missouri. Democratic nominee Daniel H. McIntyre defeated Republican nominee H. H. Harding and Greenback nominee A. McGindley.

== General election ==
On election day, November 2, 1880, Democratic nominee Daniel H. McIntyre won the election by a margin of 54,471 votes against his foremost opponent Republican nominee H. H. Harding, thereby retaining Democratic control over the office of attorney general. McIntyre was sworn in as the 19th attorney general of Missouri on January 10, 1881.

=== Results ===
Missouri Attorney General election, 1880
Party	Candidate	Votes	%
Democratic	Daniel H. McIntyre	207,944	52.45
Republican	H. H. Harding	153,473	38.71
Greenback	A. McGindley	35,062	8.84
Total votes		396,479	100.00
Democratic hold			

== See also ==
- 1880 Missouri gubernatorial election
