= St. Charles College (Missouri) =

- Type: Private
- Active: 1837–1915
- Founder: Catherine Collier
- Affiliations: Methodist Episcopal Church
- Location: St. Charles, Missouri, U.S.

St. Charles College was a school in St. Charles, Missouri, United States, established by the Methodist Episcopal Church in 1837.

== History ==
John F. Fielding served as the first president until his death in 1842. During the American Civil War, classes were suspended and the local militia commander, Arnold Krekel, used the school for a hospital and also a prison. In 1891, the school admitted female students for the first time. It became a military school in 1901 and closed in 1915. In 1917 the school grounds were given to the city of Saint Charles to be used for a high school since the former high school had burned down. That building in turn burned down in 1922.

== Sources ==
- Western Historical Manuscript Collection report on St. Charles College
