= Missouri's 7th congressional district =

U.S. House district for Missouri

- Interactive map of district boundaries since January 3, 2023 (Note: The district includes the same census blocks as drawn for the 2020 redistricting cycle in 2022 and during mid-decade redistricting in 2025. As such, boundaries of the district will not change at the 2026 elections.)
- Representative: Eric Burlison; R–Ozark
- Distribution: 59.28% urban; 40.72% rural
- Population (2025): 805,213
- Median household income: $67,356
- Ethnicity: 82.8% White; 6.1% Hispanic; 6.0% Two or more races; 2.0% Black; 1.5% Asian; 0.9% Native American; 0.7% other
- Cook PVI: R+21

Missouri's 7th congressional district consists of Southwest Missouri. The district includes Springfield, the home of Missouri State University, the Joplin metropolitan area, Missouri's 5th largest, and the popular tourist destination city of Branson. Located along the borders of Kansas, Oklahoma, and Northwest Arkansas, the district occupies part of the Bible Belt with a strong socially conservative trend. George W. Bush defeated John Kerry here 67% to 32% in the 2004 election. Republican John McCain defeated Democrat Barack Obama 63.1% to 35.3% in the 2008 election. Republican and Former Massachusetts Governor Mitt Romney defeated Barack Obama 67.6% to 30.3% in the 2012 election. In the 2020 election, Republican Donald Trump defeated Democrat Joe Biden 69.91% to 28.93%. As of 2020, this district is the second most strongly Republican district in Missouri and is one of the most strongly Republican districts in the United States.

The district is currently represented by Republican Eric Burlison of Ozark.

== Recent election results from statewide races ==
Year	Office	Results
2008	President	McCain 63–35%
2012	President	Romney 69–31%
2012	Senate	Akin 51–42%
2012	Governor	Spence 53–44%
2016	President	Trump 70–25%
2016	Senate	Blunt 64–32%
2016	Governor	Greitens 65–32%
2016	Lt. Governor	Parson 68–26%
2016	Secretary of State	Ashcroft 71–25%
2016	Attorney General	Hawley 72–28%
2018	Senate	Hawley 65–31%
2018	Auditor	McDowell 57–39%
2020	President	Trump 70–28%
2020	Governor	Parson 70–28%
2020	Lt. Governor	Kehoe 71–26%
2020	Secretary of State	Ashcroft 73–24%
2020	Treasurer	Fitzpatrick 72–25%
2020	Attorney General	Schmitt 72–25%
2022	Senate	Schmitt 68–29%
2024	President	Trump 71–28%
2024	Senate	Hawley 68–29%
2024	Governor	Kehoe 70–28%
2024	Lt. Governor	Wasinger 70–26%
2024	Secretary of State	Hoskins 70–27%
2024	Treasurer	Malek 71–26%
2024	Attorney General	Bailey 72–26%

== Composition ==
For the 118th and successive Congresses (based on redistricting following the 2020 census), the district contains all or portions of the following counties, townships, and municipalities:

Barry County (15)

All 15 communities

Christian County (11)

All 11 communities

Greene County (9)

All 9 communities

Jasper County (22)

All 22 communities

Lawrence County (12)

All 12 communities

McDonald County (8)

All 8 communities

Newton County (21)

All 21 communities

Stone County (11)

All 11 communities

Taney County (10)

All 10 communities

Webster County (4)

Diggins, Fordland, Rogersville (shared with Greene County), Seymour

== List of members representing the district ==
Member	Party	Years	Cong ress	Electoral history	District location
District created March 4, 1853
Samuel Caruthers (Cape Girardeau)	Whig	March 4, 1853 – March 3, 1855	33rd 34th 35th	Elected in 1852. Re-elected in 1854. Re-elected in 1856. Retired.	
Samuel Caruthers (Cape Girardeau)	Opposition	March 4, 1855 – March 3, 1857	33rd 34th 35th	Elected in 1852. Re-elected in 1854. Re-elected in 1856. Retired.	
Samuel Caruthers (Cape Girardeau)	Democratic	March 4, 1857 – March 3, 1859	33rd 34th 35th	Elected in 1852. Re-elected in 1854. Re-elected in 1856. Retired.	
John W. Noell (Perryville)	Democratic	March 4, 1859 – March 3, 1863	36th 37th	Elected in 1858. Re-elected in 1860. Redistricted to the 3rd district.	
Benjamin F. Loan (St. Joseph)	Union Emancipation	March 4, 1863 – March 3, 1865	38th 39th 40th	Elected in 1862. Re-elected in 1864. Re-elected in 1866. Lost re-election.	
Benjamin F. Loan (St. Joseph)	Republican	March 4, 1865 – March 3, 1869	38th 39th 40th	Elected in 1862. Re-elected in 1864. Re-elected in 1866. Lost re-election.	
Joel F. Asper (Chillicothe)	Republican	March 4, 1869 – March 3, 1871	41st	Elected in 1868. Retired.	
Isaac C. Parker (St. Joseph)	Republican	March 4, 1871 – March 3, 1873	42nd	Elected in 1870. Redistricted to the 9th district.	
Thomas T. Crittenden (Warrensburg)	Democratic	March 4, 1873 – March 3, 1875	43rd	Elected in 1872. Retired.	
John F. Philips (Sedalia)	Democratic	March 4, 1875 – March 3, 1877	44th	Elected in 1874. Lost re-election.	
Thomas T. Crittenden (Warrensburg)	Democratic	March 4, 1877 – March 3, 1879	45th	Elected in 1876. Retired.	
Alfred M. Lay (Jefferson City)	Democratic	March 4, 1879 – December 8, 1879	46th	Elected in 1878. Died.	
Vacant		December 8, 1879 – January 26, 1880	46th		
John F. Philips (Sedalia)	Democratic	January 26, 1880 – March 3, 1881	46th	Elected to finish Lay's term. Lost re-election.	
Theron M. Rice (Booneville)	Greenback	March 4, 1881 – March 3, 1883	47th	Elected in 1880. Retired.	
Aylett H. Buckner (Mexico)	Democratic	March 4, 1883 – March 3, 1885	48th	Redistricted from the 13th district and re-elected in 1882. Retired.	
John E. Hutton (Mexico)	Democratic	March 4, 1885 – March 3, 1889	49th 50th	Elected in 1884. Re-elected in 1886. Retired.	
Richard H. Norton (Troy)	Democratic	March 4, 1889 – March 3, 1893	51st 52nd	Elected in 1888. Re-elected in 1890. Lost re-election.	
John T. Heard (Sedalia)	Democratic	March 4, 1893 – March 3, 1895	53rd	Redistricted from the 6th district and re-elected in 1892. Lost re-election.	
John P. Tracey (Springfield)	Republican	March 4, 1895 – March 3, 1897	54th	Elected in 1894. Lost re-election.	
James Cooney (Marshall)	Democratic	March 4, 1897 – March 3, 1903	55th 56th 57th	Elected in 1896. Re-elected in 1898. Re-elected in 1900. Lost renomination.	
Courtney W. Hamlin (Springfield)	Democratic	March 4, 1903 – March 3, 1905	58th	Elected in 1902. Lost re-election.	
John Welborn (Lexington)	Republican	March 4, 1905 – March 3, 1907	59th	Elected in 1904. Lost re-election.	
Courtney W. Hamlin (Springfield)	Democratic	March 4, 1907 – March 3, 1919	60th 61st 62nd 63rd 64th 65th	Elected in 1906. Re-elected in 1908. Re-elected in 1910. Re-elected in 1912. Re-elected in 1914. Re-elected in 1916. Lost renomination.	
Samuel C. Major (Fayette)	Democratic	March 4, 1919 – March 3, 1921	66th	Elected in 1918. Lost re-election.	
Roscoe C. Patterson (Springfield)	Republican	March 4, 1921 – March 3, 1923	67th	Elected in 1920. Lost re-election.	
Samuel C. Major (Fayette)	Democratic	March 4, 1923 – March 3, 1929	68th 69th 70th	Elected in 1922. Re-elected in 1924. Re-elected in 1926. Lost re-election.	
John W. Palmer (Sedalia)	Republican	March 4, 1929 – March 3, 1931	71st	Elected in 1928. Lost re-election.	
Samuel C. Major (Fayette)	Democratic	March 4, 1931 – July 28, 1931	72nd	Elected in 1930. Died.	
Vacant		July 28, 1931 – September 29, 1931	72nd		
Robert D. Johnson (Marshall)	Democratic	September 29, 1931 – March 3, 1933	72nd	Elected to finish Major's term. Redistricted to at-large and lost renomination.	
District inactive		March 4, 1933 – January 3, 1935	73rd	All representatives elected at-large on a general ticket	
Dewey Short (Galena)	Republican	January 3, 1935 – January 3, 1957	74th 75th 76th 77th 78th 79th 80th 81st 82nd 83rd 84th	Elected in 1934. Re-elected in 1936. Re-elected in 1938. Re-elected in 1940. Re-elected in 1942. Re-elected in 1944. Re-elected in 1946. Re-elected in 1948. Re-elected in 1950. Re-elected in 1952. Re-elected in 1954. Lost re-election.	
Charles H. Brown (Springfield)	Democratic	January 3, 1957 – January 3, 1961	85th 86th	Elected in 1956. Re-elected in 1958. Lost re-election.	
Durward G. Hall (Springfield)	Republican	January 3, 1961 – January 3, 1973	87th 88th 89th 90th 91st 92nd	Elected in 1960. Re-elected in 1962. Re-elected in 1964. Re-elected in 1966. Re-elected in 1968. Re-elected in 1970. Retired.	
Gene Taylor (Sarcoxie)	Republican	January 3, 1973 – January 3, 1989	93rd 94th 95th 96th 97th 98th 99th 100th	Elected in 1972. Re-elected in 1974. Re-elected in 1976. Re-elected in 1978. Re-elected in 1980. Re-elected in 1982. Re-elected in 1984. Re-elected in 1986. Retired.	1973–1983 [data missing]
Gene Taylor (Sarcoxie)	Republican	January 3, 1973 – January 3, 1989	93rd 94th 95th 96th 97th 98th 99th 100th	Elected in 1972. Re-elected in 1974. Re-elected in 1976. Re-elected in 1978. Re-elected in 1980. Re-elected in 1982. Re-elected in 1984. Re-elected in 1986. Retired.	1983–1993 [data missing]
Mel Hancock (Springfield)	Republican	January 3, 1989 – January 3, 1997	101st 102nd 103rd 104th	Elected in 1988. Re-elected in 1990. Re-elected in 1992. Re-elected in 1994. Retired.	1983–1993 [data missing]
Mel Hancock (Springfield)	Republican	January 3, 1989 – January 3, 1997	101st 102nd 103rd 104th	Elected in 1988. Re-elected in 1990. Re-elected in 1992. Re-elected in 1994. Retired.	1993–2003 [data missing]
Roy Blunt (Springfield)	Republican	January 3, 1997 – January 3, 2011	105th 106th 107th 108th 109th 110th 111th	Elected in 1996. Re-elected in 1998. Re-elected in 2000. Re-elected in 2002. Re-elected in 2004. Re-elected in 2006. Re-elected in 2008. Retired to run for U.S. Senator.	1993–2003 [data missing]
Roy Blunt (Springfield)	Republican	January 3, 1997 – January 3, 2011	105th 106th 107th 108th 109th 110th 111th	Elected in 1996. Re-elected in 1998. Re-elected in 2000. Re-elected in 2002. Re-elected in 2004. Re-elected in 2006. Re-elected in 2008. Retired to run for U.S. Senator.	2003–2013
Billy Long (Springfield)	Republican	January 3, 2011 – January 3, 2023	112th 113th 114th 115th 116th 117th	Elected in 2010. Re-elected in 2012. Re-elected in 2014. Re-elected in 2016. Re-elected in 2018. Re-elected in 2020. Retired to run for U.S. senator.	2003–2013
Billy Long (Springfield)	Republican	January 3, 2011 – January 3, 2023	112th 113th 114th 115th 116th 117th	Elected in 2010. Re-elected in 2012. Re-elected in 2014. Re-elected in 2016. Re-elected in 2018. Re-elected in 2020. Retired to run for U.S. senator.	2013–2023
Eric Burlison (Ozark)	Republican	January 3, 2023 – present	118th 119th	Elected in 2022. Re-elected in 2024. Re-elected in 2026.	2023–2027

== Geography ==
=== Counties ===
There are a total of 10 counties included in MO-07.

- Barry
- Christian
- Greene
- Jasper
- Lawrence
- McDonald
- Newton
- Stone
- Taney
- Webster (parts)

=== Largest cities ===
The 9 largest cities in MO-07 are as follows.

Rank	City	County	Population (2010)	Population (2015 estimates)
1	Springfield	Greene/Christian	159,498	166,810
2	Joplin	Jasper/Newton	50,150	51,818
3	Nixa	Christian	19,022	20,984
4	Ozark	Christian	17,820	19,120
5	Republic	Christian/Greene	14,751	16,005
6	Carthage	Jasper	14,378	14,319
7	Neosho	Newton	11,835	12,156
8	Branson	Taney/Stone	10,520	11,431
9	Webb City	Jasper	10,996	11,165

=== Median household incomes ===
Rank	County	Income (2008)
1	Christian	$50,200
2	Greene	$44,185
3	Newton	$43,872
4	Stone	$40,487
5	Jasper	$40,243
6	Taney	$39,771
7	Lawrence	$39,210
8	Barry	$35,889
9	McDonald	$33,448

=== Median family incomes ===
Rank	County	Income (2008)
1	Christian	$58,806
2	Greene	$56,047
3	Newton	$51,178
4	Jasper	$49,007
5	Taney	$47,664
6	Stone	$46,675
7	Lawrence	$45,843
8	Barry	$41,861
9	McDonald	$38,848

== Election results ==
United States House of Representatives elections, 1998 Missouri 7th
Party	Candidate	Votes	%	±%
Republican	Roy Blunt (incumbent)	129,746	72.6%	
Democratic	Marc Perkel	43,146	24.3%	
Libertarian	Mike Harman	5,639	3.2%	
Total votes		178,801	100%	
Majority		80,691	45.1%	
Turnout				
Republican hold		Swing		

2002 United States House of Representatives elections in Missouri Missouri 7th
Party	Candidate	Votes	%	±%
Republican	Roy Blunt (incumbent)	149,519	74.81%	
Democratic	Roland Roy Lapham	45,964	23.00%	
Libertarian	Douglas Andrew Burlison	4,378	2.19%	
Other	Steven L. Reed	2	0.00%	
Total votes		199,863	100%	
Majority				
Turnout				
Republican hold		Swing		

2004 United States House of Representatives elections in Missouri Missouri 7th
Party	Candidate	Votes	%	±%
Republican	Roy Blunt (incumbent)	210,080	70.45%	
Democratic	Jim Newberry	84,356	28.29%	
Libertarian	James K. Craig	2,767	0.93%	
Constitution	Steve Alger	1,002	0.34%	
Total votes		298,205	100%	
Majority				
Turnout				
Republican hold		Swing		

2006 United States House of Representatives elections in Missouri Missouri 7th
Party	Candidate	Votes	%	±%
Republican	Roy Blunt (incumbent)	160,942	66.75%	
Democratic	Jack Truman	75,592	30.11%	
Libertarian	Kevin Craig	7,566	3.14%	
Other	Glenn Miller	23	0.01%	
Total votes		241,123	100%	
Majority				
Turnout				
Republican hold		Swing		

2008 United States House of Representatives elections in Missouri Missouri 7th
Party	Candidate	Votes	%	±%
Republican	Roy Blunt (incumbent)	219,016	67.76%	
Democratic	Richard Monroe	91,010	28.16%	
Libertarian	Kevin Craig	6,971	2.16%	
Constitution	Travis Maddox	6,166	1.91%	
Other	Midge Potts	49	0.02%	
Total votes		323,212	100%	
Majority				
Turnout				
Republican hold		Swing		

2010 United States House of Representatives elections in Missouri Missouri 7th
Party	Candidate	Votes	%	±%
Republican	Billy Long	141,010	63.39	
Democratic	Scott Eckersley	67,545	30.37	
Libertarian	Kevin Craig	13,866	6.23	
Write-In	Nicholas Ladendorf	10	0.00	
Total votes		222,431	100.00	
Majority				
Turnout				
Republican hold		Swing		

2012 United States House of Representatives elections in Missouri Missouri 7th
Party	Candidate	Votes	%
Republican	Billy Long (incumbent)	203,565	63.9
Democratic	Jim Evans	98,498	30.9
Libertarian	Kevin Craig	16,668	5.2
Write-in	Kenneth Joe Brown	9	0.0
Total votes		318,740	100.0
Majority			
Turnout			
Republican hold		Swing	

2014 United States House of Representatives elections in Missouri Missouri 7th
Party	Candidate	Votes	%
Republican	Billy Long (incumbent)	104,054	63.46
Democratic	Jim Evans	47,282	28.84
Libertarian	Kevin Craig	12,584	7.68
Write-Ins		37	0.02
Total votes		163,957	100
Majority			
Turnout			
Republican hold		Swing	

2016 United States House of Representatives elections in Missouri Missouri 7th
Party	Candidate	Votes	%
Republican	Billy Long (incumbent)	228,001	67.56
Democratic	Genevieve Williams	92,390	27.38
Libertarian	Benjamin T. Brixey	17,076	5.06
Write-in	Amber Thomsen	23	0.00
Total votes		337,490	100
Majority			
Turnout			
Republican hold			

2018 United States House of Representatives elections in Missouri Missouri 7th
Party	Candidate	Votes	%
Republican	Billy Long (incumbent)	196,343	66.2
Democratic	Jamie Schoolcraft	89,190	30.1
Libertarian	Ben Brixey	10,920	3.7
Independent	Shawn Deines (write-in)	2	0.0
Total votes		296,455	100.0
Republican hold			

2020 United States House of Representatives elections in Missouri Missouri 7th
Party	Candidate	Votes	%
Republican	Billy Long (incumbent)	254,318	68.9
Democratic	Teresa Montseny	98,111	26.6
Libertarian	Kevin Craig	15,573	4.2
Independent	Audrey Richards (write-in)	1,279	0.3
Write-in		2	0.0
Total votes		454,339	100.0
Republican hold			

=== 2022 ===
2022 Missouri's 7th congressional district election
Party	Candidate	Votes	%
Republican	Eric Burlison	178,592	70.9
Democratic	Kristen Radaker-Sheafer	67,485	26.8
Libertarian	Kevin Craig	5,869	2.3
Write-in		1	0.0
Total votes		251,947	100.0
Republican hold			

=== 2024 ===
2024 Missouri's 7th congressional district election
Party	Candidate	Votes	%
Republican	Eric Burlison (incumbent)	263,231	71.5
Democratic	Missi Hesketh	96,655	26.3
Libertarian	Kevin Craig	7,982	2.2
Total votes		367,868	100.0
Republican hold			

=== Prior elections ===
The table below shows how individual counties in MO-07 voted in the 2008 presidential election. U.S. Senator John McCain (R-Arizona) swept the district with 63.07 percent of the vote while U.S. Senator Barack Obama (D-Illinois) received 35.39 percent, a 27.68-percent margin of victory for the GOP. McCain received less than 60 percent in only Greene County, where Obama may have been helped by the college subplot presence of Missouri State University.

County	John McCain	Barack Obama	Difference
Newton	69.42	29.32	R + 40.10
McDonald	67.60	30.17	R + 37.43
Stone	68.02	30.69	R + 37.33
Taney	68.02	30.85	R + 37.17
Lawrence	67.70	30.64	R + 37.06
Christian	67.33	31.52	R + 35.81
Barry	66.63	31.62	R + 35.01
Jasper	65.67	32.62	R + 33.05
Polk	65.39	33.24	R + 32.15
Greene	57.06	41.26	R + 15.08

The table below shows how individual counties in MO-07 voted in the 2008 Missouri Republican Presidential Primary. Former Governor Mike Huckabee (R-Arkansas) carried every county in MO-07 over U.S. Senator John McCain (R-Arizona) and former Governor Mitt Romney (R-Massachusetts).

County	Mike Huckabee	John McCain	Mitt Romney	Difference
Taney	55.89	25.90	14.17	H + 29.99
Polk	51.33	25.28	18.65	H + 26.05
Christian	48.46	24.37	22.75	H + 24.09
McDonald	48.71	25.55	14.75	H + 23.16
Lawrence	48.75	26.19	18.96	H + 22.56
Barry	49.69	28.31	15.33	H + 21.38
Newton	45.49	25.95	22.82	H + 19.54
Jasper	42.23	25.82	26.03	H + 16.20
Greene	42.48	27.09	25.17	H + 15.39
Stone	45.01	31.82	18.80	H + 13.19

The table below shows how individual counties in MO-07 voted in the 2008 Missouri Democratic Presidential Primary. Former U.S. Senator Hillary Rodham Clinton (D-New York) carried every county in the district by convincing margins over U.S. Senator Barack Obama (D-Illinois).

County	Hillary Clinton	Barack Obama	Difference
McDonald	68.39	26.00	C + 42.39
Barry	65.52	30.47	C + 35.05
Newton	65.55	31.46	C + 34.09
Polk	63.81	33.28	C + 30.53
Taney	63.69	33.74	C + 29.95
Lawrence	61.58	34.86	C + 26.72
Stone	61.76	35.17	C + 26.59
Jasper	60.42	36.39	C + 24.03
Christian	57.68	39.93	C + 17.75
Greene	54.94	42.77	C + 12.17

The table below shows how individual counties in MO-07 voted in the 2008 Missouri gubernatorial election. Former Attorney General and now Governor Jay Nixon (D) lost the district to his challenger, former U.S. Representative Kenny Hulshof (R).

County	Kenny Hulshof	Jay Nixon	Difference
Newton	61.85	36.29	R + 25.56
McDonald	59.74	36.63	R + 23.11
Jasper	58.61	39.42	R + 19.19
Jasper	58.61	39.42	R + 19.19
Taney	51.16	46.31	R + 4.85
Stone	49.53	47.46	R + 2.07
Christian	49.65	47.73	R + 1.92
Barry	49.48	47.90	R + 1.58
Lawrence	49.15	47.94	R + 1.21
Polk	45.76	49.52	D + 3.76
Greene	42.84	54.45	D + 11.61

== See also ==
- Missouri's congressional districts
- List of United States congressional districts
