= Theron M. Rice =

American politician

Theron Moses Rice
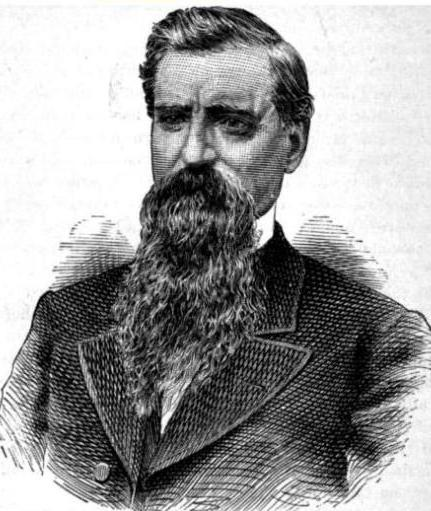

Member of the U.S. House of Representatives from Missouri's 7th district
- In office March 4, 1881 – March 3, 1883
- Preceded by: John F. Philips
- Succeeded by: Aylett H. Buckner

Personal details
- Born: September 21, 1829 Mecca, Ohio, US
- Died: November 7, 1895 (aged 66) Boonville, Missouri, US
- Party: Greenback
- Profession: lawyer

Theron Moses Rice (September 21, 1829 – November 7, 1895) was a U.S. representative from Missouri.

== Biography ==
Rice was born in Mecca, Ohio on September 21, 1829. He attended the academy in Farmington, Ohio and then Geauga Academy in Chester, received his qualification as a schoolteacher, and taught school. At Geauga Academy, he was acquainted with James A. Garfield and Garfield's future wife Lucretia Randolph, who were students at the same time as Rice.

While teaching school, Rice studied law with John Hutchins. He was admitted to the bar in June 1854 and practiced in Mahoning County, Ohio. In 1858, Rice moved to California, Missouri.

He supported the Union during the American Civil War. From June to October 1861 he served in a home guard unit commanded by Colonel Allen P. Richardson. During this service, he was offered the position of second in command as a lieutenant colonel, which he declined.

Rice then recruited a company which was mustered into service as part of the 26th Missouri Volunteer Infantry, and he served until the end of the war. He took part in all the regiment's battles, including the Siege of Corinth, the Battle of Iuka, the Battle of Missionary Ridge, and Sherman's March to the Sea. He advanced through the ranks to command the regiment with the rank of lieutenant colonel, and he led the unit to St. Louis to be mustered out in the summer of 1865.

After the war Rice resumed practicing law in Tipton, Missouri. From 1868 to 1874 he was a judge of the Missouri Circuit Court.

Rice was elected as a Greenback to the Forty-seventh Congress (March 4, 1881 – March 3, 1883). He was not a candidate for renomination in 1882.

He resumed the practice of law in Boonville, Missouri, where he died on November 7, 1895. He was interred in Tipton Cemetery in Tipton.

U.S. House of Representatives
Preceded by John F. Philips	Member of the U.S. House of Representatives from Missouri's 7th congressional district 1881–1883	Succeeded by Aylett H. Buckner
