= Ellen Frances Burpee Farr =

American painter (1840–1907)

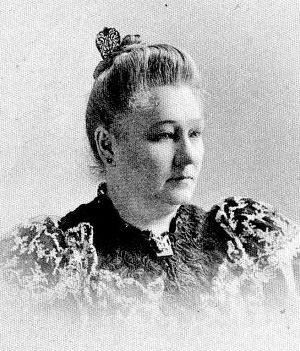
- Born: Ellen Frances Burpee; November 14, 1840; New Hampton, New Hampshire
- Died: January 5, 1907 (aged 66); Naples, Italy
- Known for: Painting
- Spouse: Evarts Worcester Farr (m. 1861–1880) his death

Ellen Frances Burpee Farr (1840–1907) was an American painter. She was one of the early women artists in California where she painted local flora and landscapes.

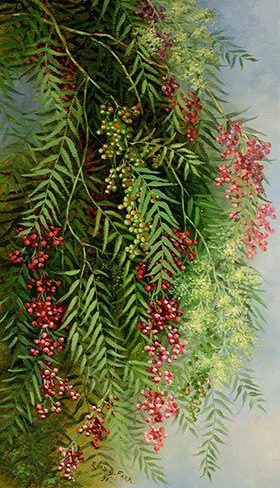
A Blossoming Pepper Tree by Ellen Frances Burpee Farr

== Biography ==
Farr née Burpee was born on November 14, 1840 in New Hampton, New Hampshire. She studied at the New Hampton Institution and the Thetford Academy in Vermont. She then taught drawing at the New Hampton Institution.

On May 19, 1861, she married Evarts Worcester Farr with whom she had three children. He was a member of the Second Regiment Volunteers in the Union Army, fighting in the Civil War for four years. He went on to become a member of the United States House of Representatives. He died in 1880.

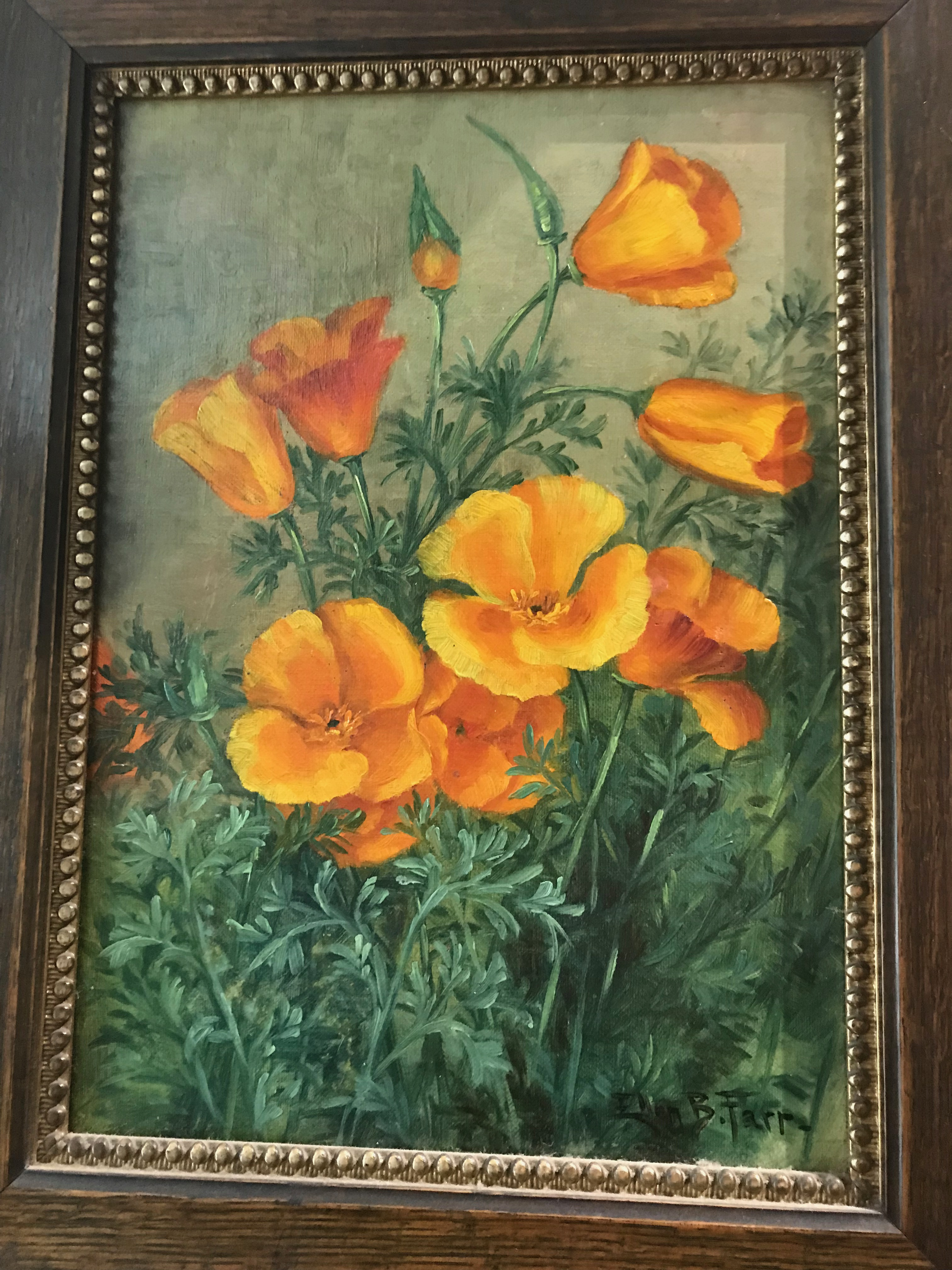
Untitled--California Poppies circa 1890 by Ellen F. Burpee Farr.

Farr moved to Boston in 1883, moving again to Pasadena, California around 1890. In California her subject matter included Pasadena area missions, pepper trees, and Indian baskets.

Farr exhibited her work at the California State Building at the 1893 World's Columbian Exposition in Chicago, Illinois. She also worked with California Board of Lady Managers at the Exposition.

Farr was a member of the Boston Art Club, where she also exhibited. She showed her paintings at the California State Fair as well.

Farr died on January 5, 1907, while in Naples, Italy.

Her work is in the Washington County Historical Society in Pennsylvania and the Littleton, New Hampshire Public Library.
