= New Hampshire's 3rd congressional district =

Former U.S. House district in New Hampshire

- Obsolete district
- Created: 1847
- Eliminated: 1883
- Years active: 1847-1883

New Hampshire's 3rd congressional district is an obsolete district. It was organized from the state's at-large district in 1847. It was eliminated after the 1880 census. The last representative serving the district was Ossian Ray.

== List of members representing the district ==
Member (Residence)	Party	Years	Cong ress	Electoral history
District established March 4, 1847
James Wilson II (Keene)	Whig	March 4, 1847 – September 9, 1850	30th 31st	Elected in 1847. Re-elected in 1849. Resigned.
Vacant		September 9, 1850 – October 8, 1850	31st	
George W. Morrison (Manchester)	Democratic	October 8, 1850 – March 3, 1851	31st	Elected to finish Wilson's term. Lost re-election.
Jared Perkins (Winchester)	Whig	March 4, 1851 – March 3, 1853	32nd	Elected in 1851. Lost re-election.
Harry Hibbard (Bath)	Democratic	March 3, 1853 – March 3, 1855	33rd	Redistricted from the 4th district and re-elected in 1853. Retired.
Aaron H. Cragin (Lebanon)	American	March 4, 1855 – March 3, 1857	34th 35th	Elected in 1855. Re-elected in 1857. Retired.
Aaron H. Cragin (Lebanon)	Republican	March 4, 1857 – March 3, 1859	34th 35th	Elected in 1855. Re-elected in 1857. Retired.
Thomas M. Edwards (Keene)	Republican	March 4, 1859 – March 3, 1863	36th 37th	Elected in 1859. Re-elected in 1861. Retired.
James W. Patterson (Hanover)	Republican	March 4, 1863 – March 3, 1867	38th 39th	Elected in 1863. Re-elected in 1865. Retired to run for U.S. senator.
Jacob Benton (Lancaster)	Republican	March 4, 1867 – March 3, 1871	40th 41st	Elected in 1867. Re-elected in 1869. Retired.
Hosea Washington Parker (Claremont)	Democratic	March 4, 1871 – March 3, 1875	42nd 43rd	Elected in 1871. Re-elected in 1873. Lost re-election.
Henry W. Blair (Plymouth)	Republican	March 4, 1875 – March 3, 1879	44th 45th	Elected in 1875. Re-elected in 1877. Retired to run for U.S. senator.
Evarts Worcester Farr (Littleton)	Republican	March 4, 1879 – November 30, 1880	46th	Elected in 1878. Re-elected in 1880 but died before the next term began.
Vacant		November 30, 1880 – January 8, 1881	46th	
Ossian Ray (Lancaster)	Republican	January 8, 1881 – March 3, 1883	46th 47th	Elected December 28, 1880 to finish Farr's term and seated January 8, 1881. Also elected December 28, 1880 to the next term. Redistricted to the 2nd district.
District dissolved March 3, 1883
