= John Finis Philips =

American judge

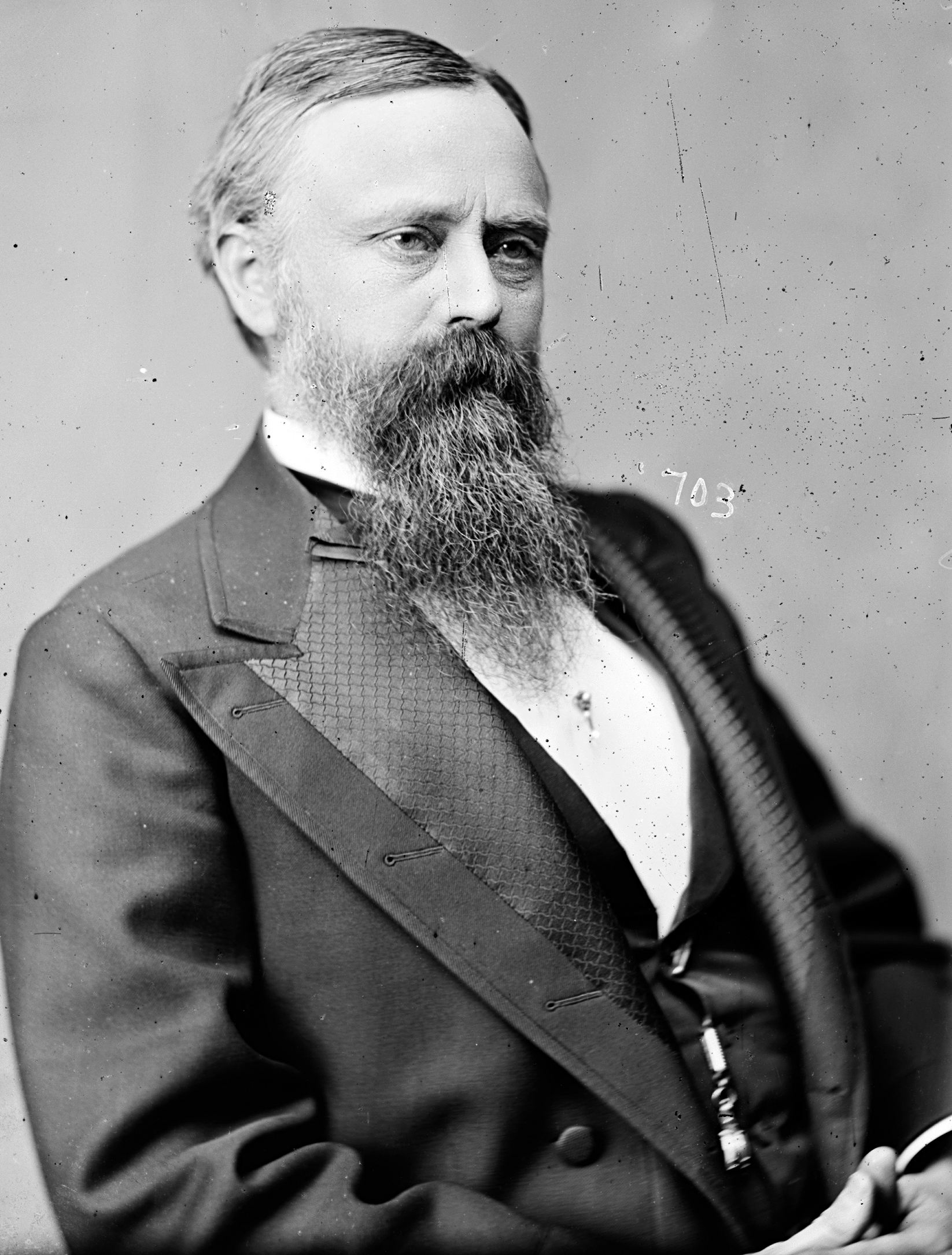

Judge of the United States District Court for the Western District of Missouri
- In office June 25, 1888 – June 25, 1910
- Appointed by: Grover Cleveland
- Preceded by: Arnold Krekel
- Succeeded by: Arba Seymour Van Valkenburgh

Member of the U.S. House of Representatives from Missouri's 7th district
- In office January 10, 1880 – March 3, 1881
- Preceded by: Alfred Morrison Lay
- Succeeded by: Theron Moses Rice
- In office March 4, 1875 – March 3, 1877
- Preceded by: Thomas Theodore Crittenden
- Succeeded by: Thomas Theodore Crittenden

Personal details
- Born: John Finis Philips; December 31, 1834 Boone County, Missouri, US
- Died: March 13, 1919 (aged 84) Hot Springs, Arkansas, US
- Resting place: Mount Washington Cemetery, Kansas City, Missouri, US
- Party: Democratic
- Education: Centre College (A.B.) read law

John Finis Philips (December 31, 1834 – March 13, 1919) was a United States representative from Missouri and a United States district judge of the United States District Court for the Western District of Missouri.

== Education and career ==
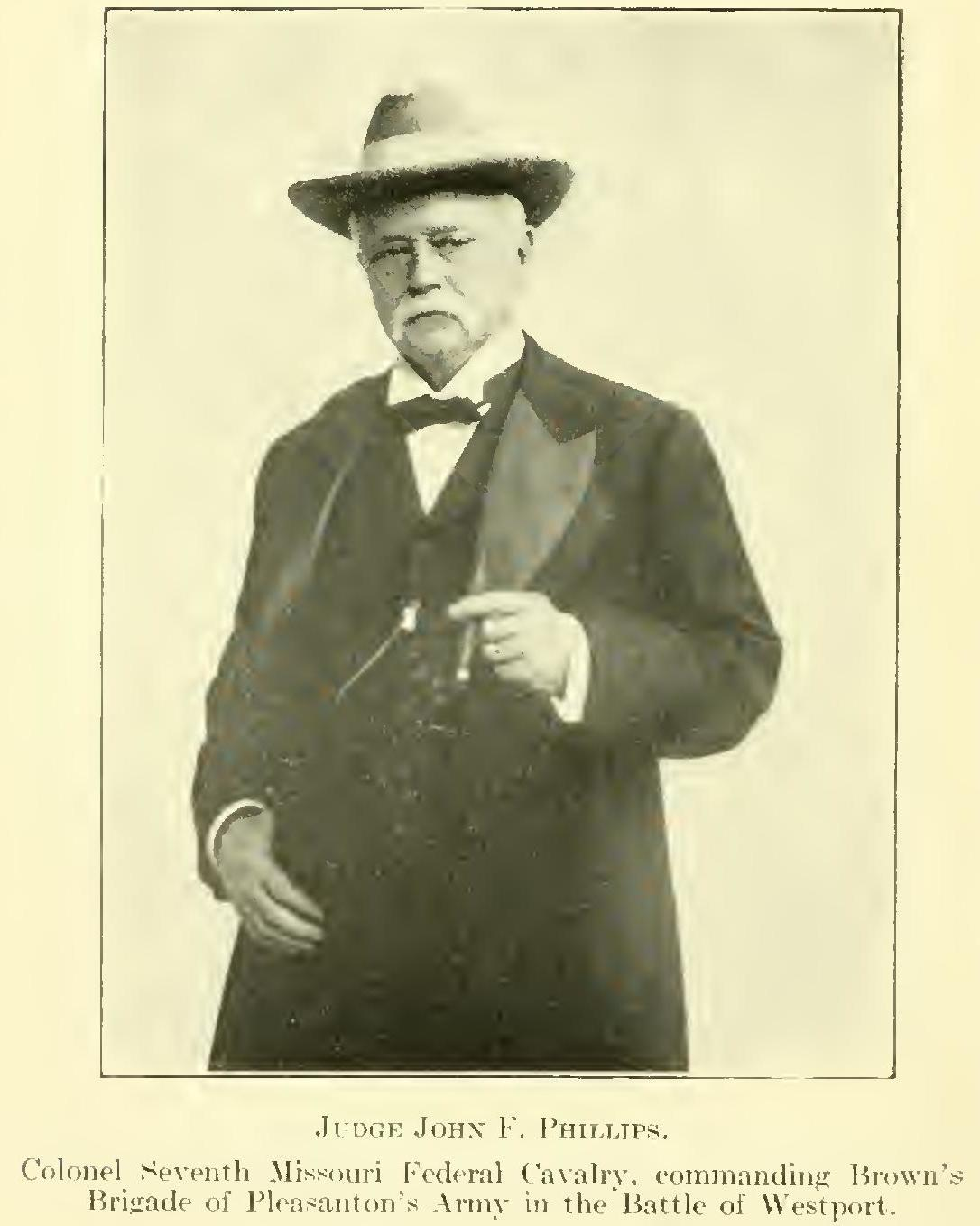
"Judge John F. Phillips" "Colonel Seventh Missouri Federal Cavalry, commanding Brown's Brigade of Pleasanton's Army in the Battle of Westport"

Born on December 31, 1834, in the historical community of Thralls Prairie in Boone County, Missouri, Philips attended the common schools and the University of Missouri, then received an Artium Baccalaureus degree in 1855 from Centre College and read law in 1857. He was admitted to the bar and entered private practice in Georgetown, Missouri from 1857 to 1861. He was a member of the state constitutional convention in 1861. He was a United States Army colonel commanding the Seventh Regiment of the Missouri Volunteer Cavalry from 1861 to 1865, during the American Civil War. He resumed private practice in Sedalia, Missouri from 1865 to 1880. He was a candidate for the United States House of Representatives of the 41st United States Congress from Missouri in 1868. He served as the mayor of Sedalia. He was a delegate to the Democratic National Convention in 1868.

=== Notable combat experience ===
During the Battle of Westport, Philips was placed in command of a brigade when his superior, Brigadier General Egbert Brown, was placed under arrest by Major General Alfred Pleasanton for not promptly attacking at Byram's Ford. Continuing in command after having taken the ford, Philips' brigade played a key role in the crushing victory at Mine Creek two days later. According to his diary he suffered an irritating wound to his right eye during the battle.

== Congressional service ==
Philips was elected as a Democrat from Missouri's 7th congressional district to the United States House of Representatives of the 44th United States Congress, serving from March 4, 1875, to March 3, 1877. He was elected from Missouri's 7th congressional district to the United States House of Representatives of the 46th United States Congress to fill the vacancy caused by the death of United States Representative Alfred M. Lay and served from January 10, 1880, to March 3, 1881. He was an unsuccessful candidate for reelection in 1880 to the 47th United States Congress.

== Later career ==
Following his departure from Congress, Philips resumed private practice in Kansas City, Missouri from 1881 to 1882. He was a commissioner for the Supreme Court of Missouri from 1883 to 1885. He was a Judge of the Missouri Court of Appeals in Kansas City from 1885 to 1888.

=== Notable case ===
Philips was a member of the defense team for the 1883 Gallatin, Missouri murder trial of Frank James.

== Federal judicial service ==
Philips was nominated by President Grover Cleveland on June 19, 1888, to a seat on the United States District Court for the Western District of Missouri vacated by Judge Arnold Krekel. He was confirmed by the United States Senate on June 25, 1888, and received his commission the same day. His service terminated on June 25, 1910, due to his retirement.

== Final years and death ==
Following his retirement from the federal bench, Philips resumed private practice in Kansas City from 1910 to 1917. He died on March 13, 1919, in Hot Springs, Arkansas. He was interred at Mount Washington Cemetery in Kansas City.

== Sources ==
- United States Congress. "John Finis Philips (id: P000304)". Biographical Directory of the United States Congress.
- Annual Report of the Adjutant General of Missouri, for the year ending December 31, 1865, Published by Emory S. Foster, Jefferson City, Missouri, 1866
- Lee, Fred. L., Gettysburg of the West: The Battle of Westport, October 21–23, 1864, Rev. Ed., Two Trails Publishing, 1996
- Moser, Arthur P., "A Directory of Towns, Villages, and Hamlets Past and Present of Boone County, Missouri" http://thelibrary.org/lochist/moser/booneco.html Archived 2016-03-03 at the Wayback Machine

U.S. House of Representatives
Preceded by Thomas Theodore Crittenden	Member of the U.S. House of Representatives from Missouri's 7th congressional district 1875–1877	Succeeded by Thomas Theodore Crittenden
Preceded by Alfred Morrison Lay	Member of the U.S. House of Representatives from Missouri's 7th congressional district 1880–1881	Succeeded by Theron Moses Rice
Legal offices
Preceded by Arnold Krekel	Judge of the United States District Court for the Western District of Missouri; 1888–1910	Succeeded by Arba Seymour Van Valkenburgh
