= Thomas Theodore Crittenden =

American politician (1832–1909)

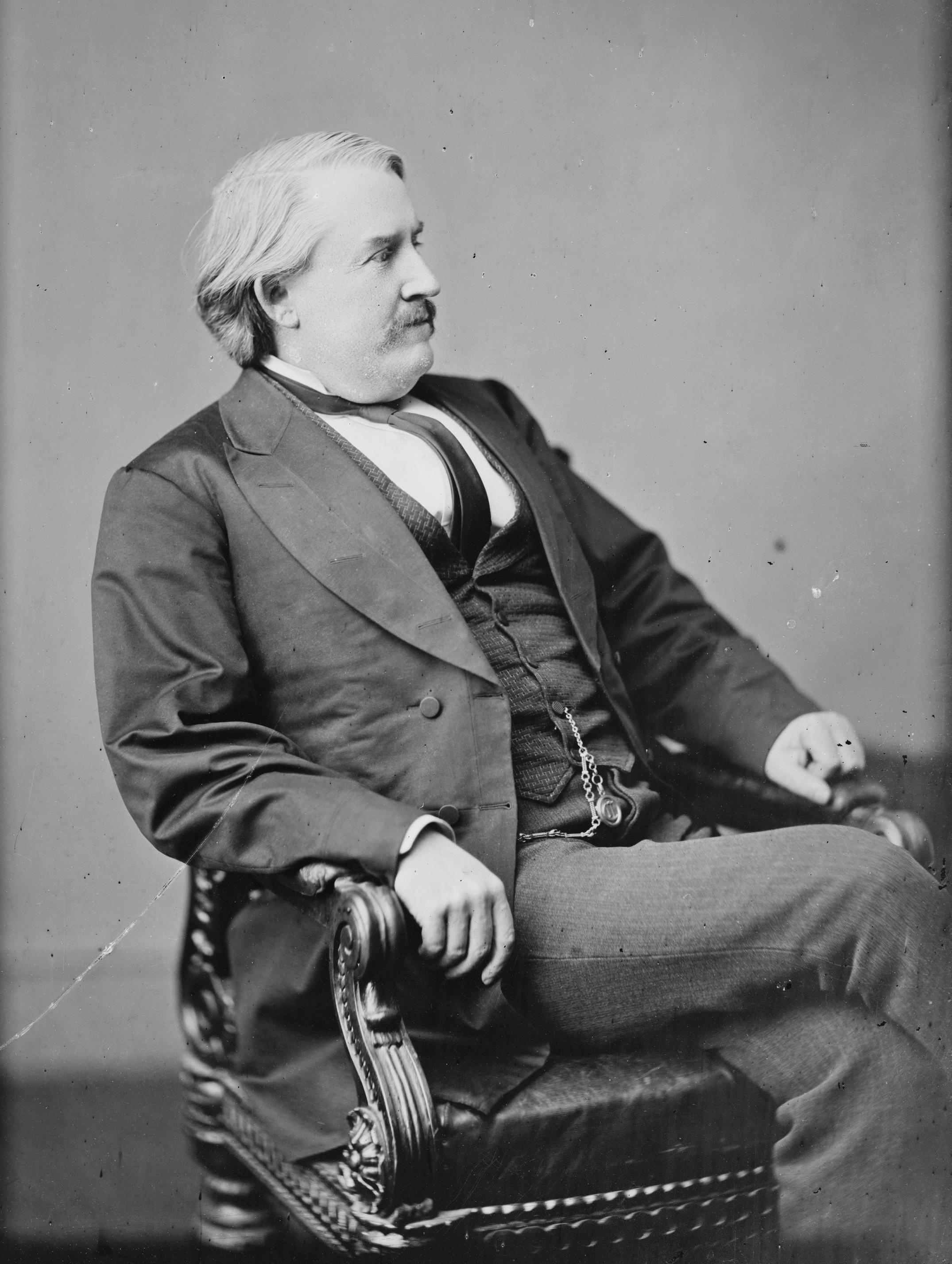

24th Governor of Missouri
- In office January 10, 1881 – January 12, 1885
- Lieutenant: Robert Alexander Campbell
- Preceded by: John S. Phelps
- Succeeded by: John S. Marmaduke

Member of the U.S. House of Representatives from Missouri's 7th district
- In office March 4, 1877 – March 3, 1879
- Preceded by: John Finis Philips
- Succeeded by: Alfred M. Lay
- In office March 4, 1873 – March 3, 1875
- Preceded by: Isaac C. Parker
- Succeeded by: John Finis Philips

12th Attorney General of Missouri
- In office 1864–1865
- Governor: Willard Preble Hall
- Preceded by: Aikman Welch
- Succeeded by: Robert Franklin Wingate

Personal details
- Born: January 1, 1832 Shelbyville, Kentucky, U.S.
- Died: May 29, 1909 (aged 77) Kansas City, Missouri, U.S.
- Resting place: Forest Hill Calvary Cemetery; Kansas City, Missouri, U.S.
- Party: Democratic
- Spouse: Caroline Jackson (m. 1856)
- Relations: William Logan Crittenden (brother); John J. Crittenden (uncle)
- Children: Thomas T. Crittenden Jr.
- Occupation: Politician
- Profession: Attorney

Military service
- Allegiance: United States
- Branch/service: United States Army
- Years of service: 1862–1864
- Rank: Colonel
- Unit: Seventh Missouri State Militia Cavalry Regiment
- Battles/wars: American Civil War

Thomas Theodore Crittenden (January 1, 1832 – May 29, 1909) was an American politician and military officer who served as the 24th governor of Missouri from 1881 to 1885. He was a Union Army colonel during the American Civil War.

== Early life and education ==
Crittenden was born in 1832 in Shelbyville, Kentucky, to Henry and Anna Maria Crittenden. He was born into a political family and was the nephew of Kentucky Governor John J. Crittenden. He was educated at Centre College and also studied law with his uncle.

== Marriage and family ==
In 1856, Crittenden married Caroline Wheeler "Carrie" Jackson (August 1, 1839 – January 27, 1917) and had several children. His son Thomas T. Crittenden Jr. was later a mayor of Kansas City, and his son Henry Huston Crittenden (1859–1943) was compiler of The Crittenden Memoirs (1936).

== Career ==
Shortly following Crittenden's marriage, the family moved to Lexington, Missouri, where he started a law practice. During the American Civil War Crittenden was appointed a Colonel in the 7th Missouri State Militia Cavalry, fighting on the Union side. Governor Willard Preble Hall appointed Crittenden to the post of Missouri Attorney General in 1864.

Following his term, Crittenden moved his law practice to Warrensburg, Missouri, in partnership with Francis Cockrell. Crittenden was elected to the United States House of Representatives for the 7th congressional district in 1872 and again in 1876. In 1880, he helped to found the Missouri Bar Association.

Crittenden was elected Governor of Missouri in the 1880 election. As governor, Crittenden wanted to suppress the robberies and violence committed by the James Gang. He authorized a reward of $5,000 (which was paid for by railroad corporations) for the capture of Jesse James and also for his brother Frank, which resulted in Robert Ford killing Jesse in 1882. Following Ford's conviction for the murder, Crittenden pardoned him. On October 5, 1882, Frank James surrendered in Jefferson City.

During his term, Crittenden's administration also collected payment on loans to the Hannibal and St. Joseph Railroad, reduced state debt, established the Missouri State Board of Health and the Missouri State Bureau of Mines and Mine inspection, increased appropriations for education, and started a training school for nurses in St. Louis.

Following his gubernatorial term, Crittenden moved to Kansas City, Missouri and practiced law. From 1893 to 1897, he was the United States consul general in Mexico City, appointed by President Grover Cleveland. Crittenden died in 1909 in Kansas City, Missouri. He was buried there at the Forest Hill Calvary Cemetery in Kansas City.

== Popular media ==
In the 2007 movie The Assassination of Jesse James by the Coward Robert Ford, Crittenden is portrayed by James Carville.

Party political offices
Preceded by John S. Phelps	Democratic nominee for Governor of Missouri; 1880	Succeeded by John S. Marmaduke
Legal offices
Preceded by Aikman Welch	Missouri State Attorney General; 1864	Succeeded by Robert Franklin Wingate
U.S. House of Representatives
Preceded by Isaac C. Parker	Member of the U.S. House of Representatives from Missouri's 7th congressional district 1873–1875	Succeeded by John Finis Philips
Preceded by John Finis Philips	Member of the U.S. House of Representatives from Missouri's 7th congressional district 1877–1879	Succeeded by Alfred M. Lay
Political offices
Preceded by John S. Phelps	Governor of Missouri; 1881–1885	Succeeded by John S. Marmaduke
