= Ossian Ray =

American politician (1835–1892)

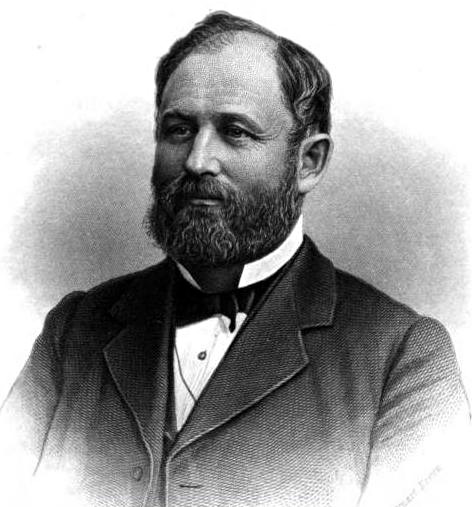

Member of the U.S. House of Representatives from New Hampshire
- In office January 8, 1881 – March 3, 1885
- Preceded by: Evarts W. Farr (3rd); James F. Briggs (2nd)
- Succeeded by: District eliminated (3rd); Jacob H. Gallinger (2nd)
- Constituency: 3rd district (1881-83); 2nd district (1883-85)

Member of the New Hampshire House of Representatives
- In office 1868–1869

Personal details
- Born: December 13, 1835 Hinesburg, Vermont
- Died: January 28, 1892 (aged 56) Lancaster, New Hampshire
- Resting place: Summer Street Cemetery
- Party: Republican
- Profession: Lawyer

Ossian Ray (December 13, 1835 – January 28, 1892) was a United States representative from New Hampshire.

== Early years ==
Ray was born in Hinesburg, Vermont and his family moved to Irasburg, Vermont when he was young. He attended the public schools and an academy in nearby Derby. He studied law in Irasburg and in Lancaster, New Hampshire, where he moved in 1854. Mr. Ray was admitted to the bar in 1857 and practiced in Essex and Coos counties.

== Politics ==
Ray was the solicitor for Coos County, New Hampshire from 1862 to 1872. He twice served as a member of the New Hampshire House of Representatives in 1868 and, again, in 1869. He was a delegate to the Republican National Convention in 1872. For a short time, from February 22, 1879, until he resigned effective on December 23, 1880, Ray was the United States Attorney for the District of New Hampshire. He was elected as a Republican to the Forty-sixth Congress to fill the vacancy caused by the death of Evarts W. Farr and was re-elected to the Forty-seventh and Forty-eighth Congresses, serving from January 8, 1881, to March 3, 1885. Ray did not seek renomination in 1884.

== Death ==
Ossian Ray died in Lancaster, New Hampshire in 1892 and was buried in the Summer Street Cemetery.

U.S. House of Representatives
Preceded by Evarts Worcester Farr	Member of the U.S. House of Representatives from New Hampshire's 3rd congressional district January 8, 1881 – March 3, 1883	Succeeded by District eliminated
Preceded by James F. Briggs	Member of the U.S. House of Representatives from New Hampshire's 2nd congressional district March 4, 1883 – March 3, 1885	Succeeded by Jacob H. Gallinger
