= Alfred M. Lay =

American politician

Member of the U.S. House of Representatives from Missouri's 7th district
- In office March 4, 1879 – December 8, 1879
- Preceded by: Thomas T. Crittenden
- Succeeded by: John F. Philips

Personal details
- Born: Alfred Morrison Lay; May 20, 1836 Lewis County, Missouri, US
- Died: December 8, 1879 (aged 43) Washington, D.C., US
- Party: Democratic
- Profession: lawyer

Alfred Morrison Lay (May 20, 1836 – December 8, 1879) was a U.S. representative from Missouri.

== Biography ==
Born in Lewis County, Missouri, Lay moved with his parents to Benton County in 1842. He attended private schools and was graduated from Bethany College, Virginia (now in West Virginia), in 1856. He studied law. He was admitted to the bar in 1857 and commenced practice in Jefferson City, Missouri. He was appointed United States district attorney for the western district of Missouri by President Buchanan and served until his resignation in 1861. Enlisted as a private in the Missouri State Guard and was subsequently promoted to the rank of major. He returned to Missouri when the command disbanded. He served as captain of ordnance, Confederate States Army. He resumed the practice of law in Jefferson City, Missouri. He served as member of the State constitutional convention in 1875.

Lay was elected as a Democrat to the Forty-sixth Congress and served from March 4, 1879, until his death in Washington, D.C., on December 8, 1879. He was interred in Woodlawn Cemetery, Jefferson City, Missouri.

== See also ==
- List of members of the United States Congress who died in office (1790–1899)

U.S. House of Representatives
Preceded by Thomas Theodore Crittenden	Member of the U.S. House of Representatives from Missouri's 7th congressional district 1879	Succeeded by John F. Philips
