= Evarts Worcester Farr =

American politician (1840-1880)

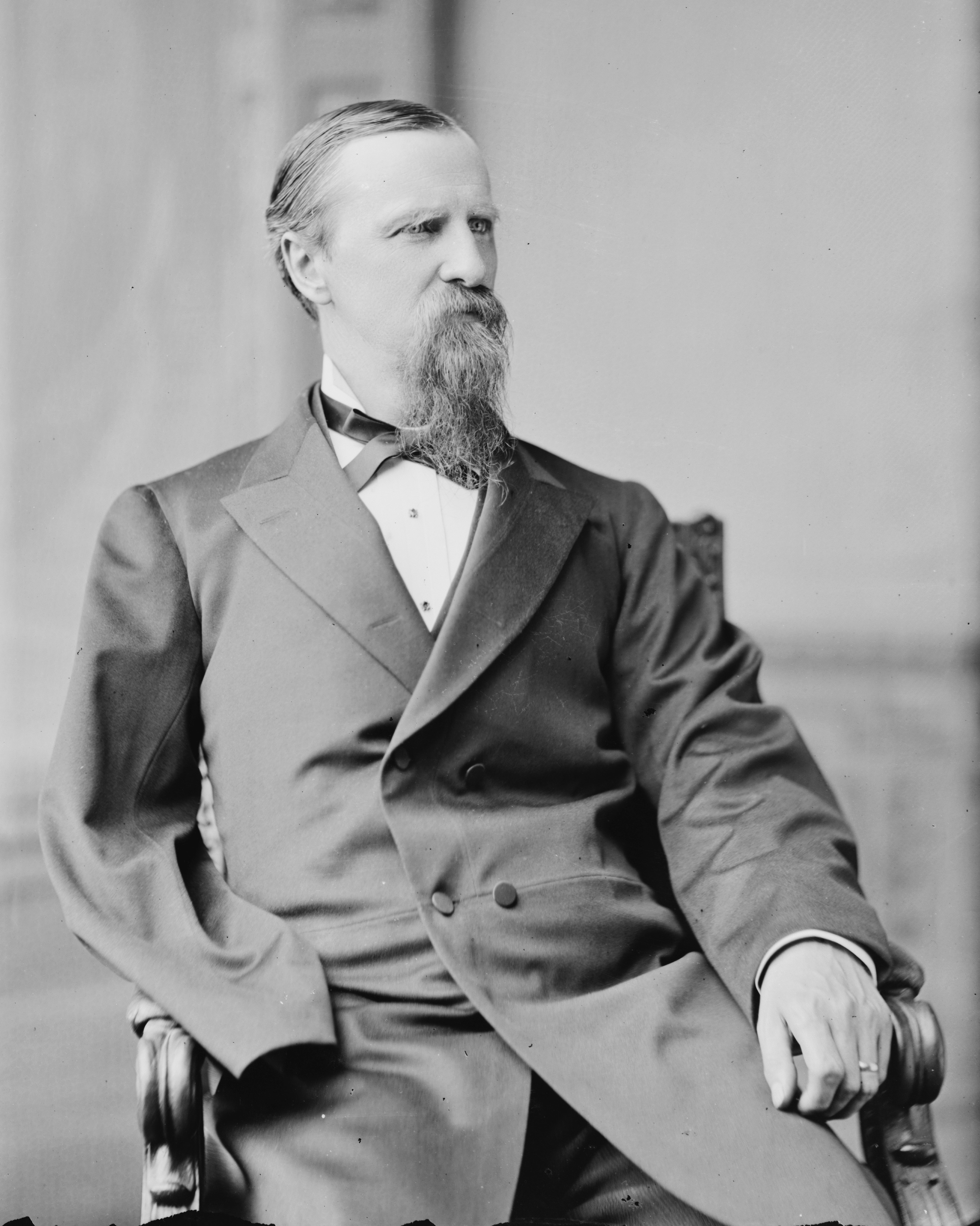

Member of the U.S. House of Representatives from New Hampshire's 3rd district
- In office March 4, 1879 – November 30, 1880
- Preceded by: Henry W. Blair
- Succeeded by: Ossian Ray

Member of the Executive Council of New Hampshire
- In office 1876–1876

Personal details
- Born: October 10, 1840 Littleton, New Hampshire
- Died: November 30, 1880 (aged 40) Littleton, New Hampshire
- Resting place: Glenwood Cemetery
- Party: Republican

Military service
- Allegiance: United States
- Branch/service: (United States) Union Army
- Rank: Major
- Commands: Company G, 2nd New Hampshire Volunteer Regiment; 11th Regiment, New Hampshire Volunteer Infantry.
- Battles/wars: Civil War

Evarts Worcester Farr (October 10, 1840 – November 30, 1880) was a U.S. representative from New Hampshire.

== Early life ==
Born in Littleton, New Hampshire, Farr attended the common schools and Dartmouth College.

On May 19, 1861, he married Ellen Frances Burpee Farr with whom he had three children.

== American Civil War service ==
During the Civil War, he entered the Union Army as First Lieutenant of Company G, 2nd New Hampshire Volunteer Regiment, and served as Major in the Eleventh Regiment, New Hampshire Volunteer Infantry. Farr lost his right arm in the Battle of Williamsburg, but returned to service two months later.

== Postwar career ==
Following the war, he studied law, was admitted to the bar in 1867 and commenced practice in Littleton, New Hampshire. He served as assistant assessor of internal revenue, 1865–1869, and as assessor of internal revenue 1869–1873. He was solicitor for Grafton County, 1873–1879, and was a member of the Executive Council of New Hampshire in 1876.

== Congressional service ==
Farr was elected as a Republican to the Forty-sixth and Forty-seventh Congresses. Farr served from March 4, 1879, until his death. Farr did not serve in the Forty-seventh Congress because he died before it convened.

== Death and burial ==
Farr died in Littleton, New Hampshire on November 30, 1880. He was interred in Glenwood Cemetery.

== See also ==
- List of members of the United States Congress who died in office (1790–1899)

U.S. House of Representatives
Preceded by Henry W. Blair	Member of the U.S. House of Representatives from New Hampshire's 3rd congressional district March 4, 1879 – November 30, 1880	Succeeded by Ossian Ray
