= Henry W. Blair =

American military officer and politician (1834–1920)

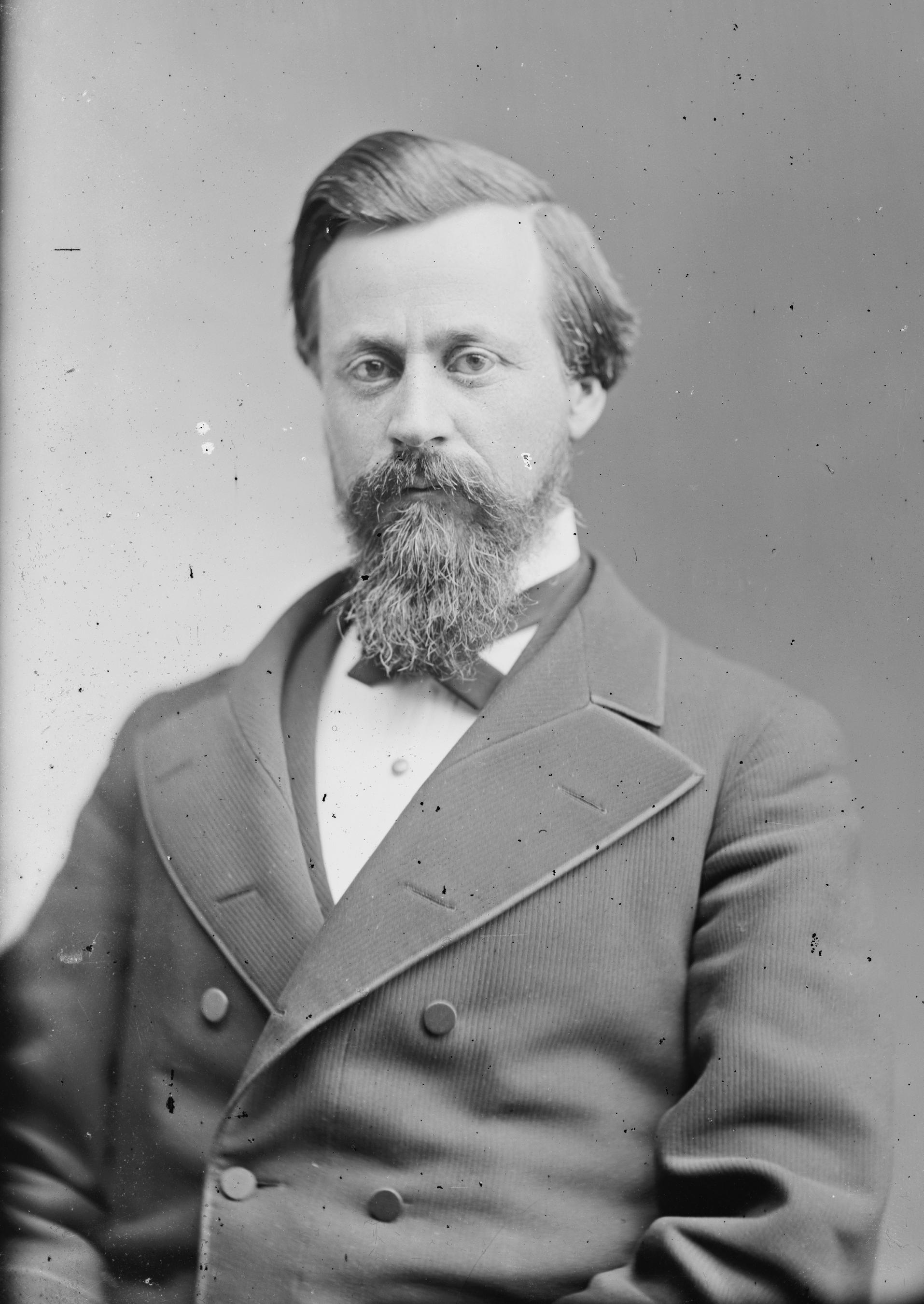
- Blair, 1865–1880

United States Senator from New Hampshire
- In office June 18, 1879 – March 3, 1891
- Preceded by: Charles H. Bell
- Succeeded by: Jacob H. Gallinger

Member of the U.S. House of Representatives from New Hampshire
- In office March 4, 1875 – March 3, 1879
- Preceded by: Hosea Washington Parker
- Succeeded by: Evarts Worcester Farr
- Constituency: 3rd district
- In office March 4, 1893 – March 3, 1895
- Preceded by: Luther F. McKinney
- Succeeded by: Cyrus A. Sulloway
- Constituency: 1st district

Member of the New Hampshire House of Representatives
- In office 1866

Member of the New Hampshire Senate
- In office 1867–1868

Personal details
- Born: Henry William Blair; December 6, 1834 Campton, New Hampshire
- Died: March 14, 1920 (aged 85) Washington, D.C.
- Party: Republican
- Spouse: Eliza Nelson Blair
- Children: Henry P. Blair
- Parent(s): William Henry Blair; Lois (Baker) Blair
- Occupation: Lawyer; Politician

Military service
- Allegiance: United States of America
- Branch/service: Union Army
- Rank: lieutenant colonel
- Unit: Fifteenth Regiment, New Hampshire Volunteer Infantry
- Battles/wars: Civil War

Henry William Blair (December 6, 1834 – March 14, 1920) was a United States representative and Senator from New Hampshire. During the American Civil War, he was a Lieutenant Colonel in the Union Army.

A Radical Republican in his earlier political career, Blair later became associated with the moderate "Half-Breeds" who as a bloc pushed for civil service reform at the expense of racial and social equality efforts. Still, Blair himself was later refused as United States Minister to China.

== Early life ==
Born in Campton, New Hampshire, Blair lost his father at two and his mother at twelve. Raised by neighbors on a farm, he attended school when breaks from farm work permitted. Though he never went to college, in 1856, he began reading law with William Leverett at Plymouth, and was admitted to the bar in 1859 and became Leverett's partner.

== Career ==
Blair was appointed prosecuting attorney for Grafton County in 1860.

During the Civil War Blair was rejected by the fifth and twelfth regiments as physically unfit. In 1862, when the fifteenth regiment was formed, he raised a company, enlisted as a Private and was elected Captain. He was appointed Major by the Governor and his Council. After about a year at the front, he held the rank of lieutenant colonel of the Fifteenth Regiment, New Hampshire Volunteer Infantry. During his first battle service, the Siege of Port Hudson, he was wounded twice. After the discharge of his regiment in 1863, he was appointed deputy provost marshal and spent most of the remainder of the war at home as an invalid due to wounds and diseases contracted during the war.

Blair was a member of the New Hampshire House of Representatives in 1866 and a member of the New Hampshire Senate from 1867 to 1868.

Elected as a Republican to the Forty-fourth and Forty-fifth Congresses, Blair served as United States Representative for the state of New Hampshire from (March 4, 1875 – March 3, 1879). In 1876, he introduced the first prohibition amendment to be offered in Congress. He was not a candidate for renomination in 1878 but was elected by the New Hampshire legislature to the U.S. Senate on June 17, 1879, for the vacancy in the term ending March 3, 1885, and served from June 20, 1879, to March 3, 1885. The State legislature not being in session, he was re-appointed on March 5, 1885, and elected on June 17, 1885, to fill the vacancy in the term beginning March 4, 1885, and served from March 10, 1885, to March 3, 1891. He was an unsuccessful candidate for renomination in 1891. While in the Senate.

According to The New York Times:

His record in Congress, both as an advocate of radical Republican principles, and of all the genuine moral reforms, particularly temperance reform, is highly spoken of. He is also recommended as an able, honest, and a courageous man; a faithful soldier in the war of the rebellion, and a faithful member of the national House.

— The New York Times, June 12, 1879

Similar to many Republicans at the time, Blair favored higher protective tariffs, the gold standard, and generous pensions for Union veterans of the Civil War.

During late 1882 and early January 1883, Blair attached an amendment to the Pendleton Civil Service Reform Act that prohibited hiring habitual drunkards to federal government positions, reflecting his effort to combat alcohol abuse. However, he did not vote on the final passage of the Pendleton Act.

He was chairman of the Committee on Education and Labor during the Forty-seventh through the Fifty-first Congresses. He proposed legislation to move control of education from the local level to the federal level during the 1880s. His proposed "Blair Education Bill" advocated federal aid for education and passed the Senate on three occasions, was endorsed by presidents, but never passed the House. Blair wrote to African-American leader Frederick Douglass:

It must, I think, have become evident to all that there must be a return to the fundamental issues which stir the heart and touch the life of the Republic or there is nothing except assured defeat for us next autumn.

— Blair in a letter to Douglass

Blair declined an appointment by President Benjamin Harrison as judge of the United States District Court for the District of New Hampshire in 1891, but accepted an appointment as Envoy Extraordinary and Minister Plenipotentiary to China on March 6, 1891. The Chinese Government objected to Blair because of his role in and abusive remarks pertaining to the passing of the Chinese Exclusion Act and declared him persona non grata. He subsequently tendered his resignation from the diplomatic post, which was accepted October 6, 1891.

Again elected to the United States House of Representatives in 1892, Blair served from March 4, 1893, to March 3, 1895, and was not a candidate for reelection in 1894. He engaged in the practice of law in Washington, D.C., until his death.

== Personal life ==
Blair was the son of William Henry Blair and Lois (Baker) Blair. He married Eliza Nelson on December 20, 1859, and they had one son, Henry Patterson Blair.

Blair died in Washington, D.C., on March 14, 1920 (age 85 years, 99 days). He is interred at Campton Cemetery, Campton, New Hampshire.

== Sources ==
- Gordon B. McKinney. Henry W. Blair's Campaign to Reform America: From the Civil War to the U.S. Senate (University Press of Kentucky; 2013) 246 pages

U.S. House of Representatives
Preceded by Hosea Washington Parker	Member of the U.S. House of Representatives from New Hampshire's 3rd congressional district March 4, 1875 – March 3, 1879	Succeeded by Evarts Worcester Farr
U.S. Senate
Preceded by Charles H. Bell	U.S. senator (Class 3) from New Hampshire; June 20, 1879 – March 3, 1885; March 5, 1885 – March 3, 1891; Served alongside: Edward H. Rollins, Austin F. Pike, Person C. Cheney, William E. Chandler, Gilman Marston, William E. Chandler	Succeeded by Jacob H. Gallinger
U.S. House of Representatives
Preceded by Luther F. McKinney	Member of the U.S. House of Representatives from New Hampshire's 1st congressional district March 4, 1893 – March 3, 1895	Succeeded by Cyrus A. Sulloway
