= Nicholas Krekel =

American soldier and city founder (1825–1910)

Nicholas Krekel (August 30, 1825 – February 6, 1910) was a German who served in the American army and is best known as the founder of O'Fallon, Missouri.

In 1832, his family (including his brother Arnold Krekel) left Bremen for New York. During the trip to the Midwest, his mother died. The family eventually settled in St. Charles County, Missouri, where his father purchased 110 acres of land for $25. Nicholas worked on the farm, and in 1848, fought in the Mexican-American War under General Stirling Price.

His brother Arnold purchased an investment property in what is now O’Fallon in 1855. Although Arnold Krekel never lived there, he designed the town, known as the Krekel Addition, granted a right-of-way to the North Missouri Railroad owned by John O'Fallon, and named the town.

Nicholas Krekel founded O'Fallon in 1856, clearing the land and building its first home, a two-room log cabin which he later replaced with a one-and-a-half story house that included a place to display merchandise, making him both the first resident and the first retailer in O'Fallon. He also was the town's first postmaster and railroad station agent. He married Wilhelmina Moritz in 1857; they had 7 children.
