= Arnold Krekel =

United States federal judge

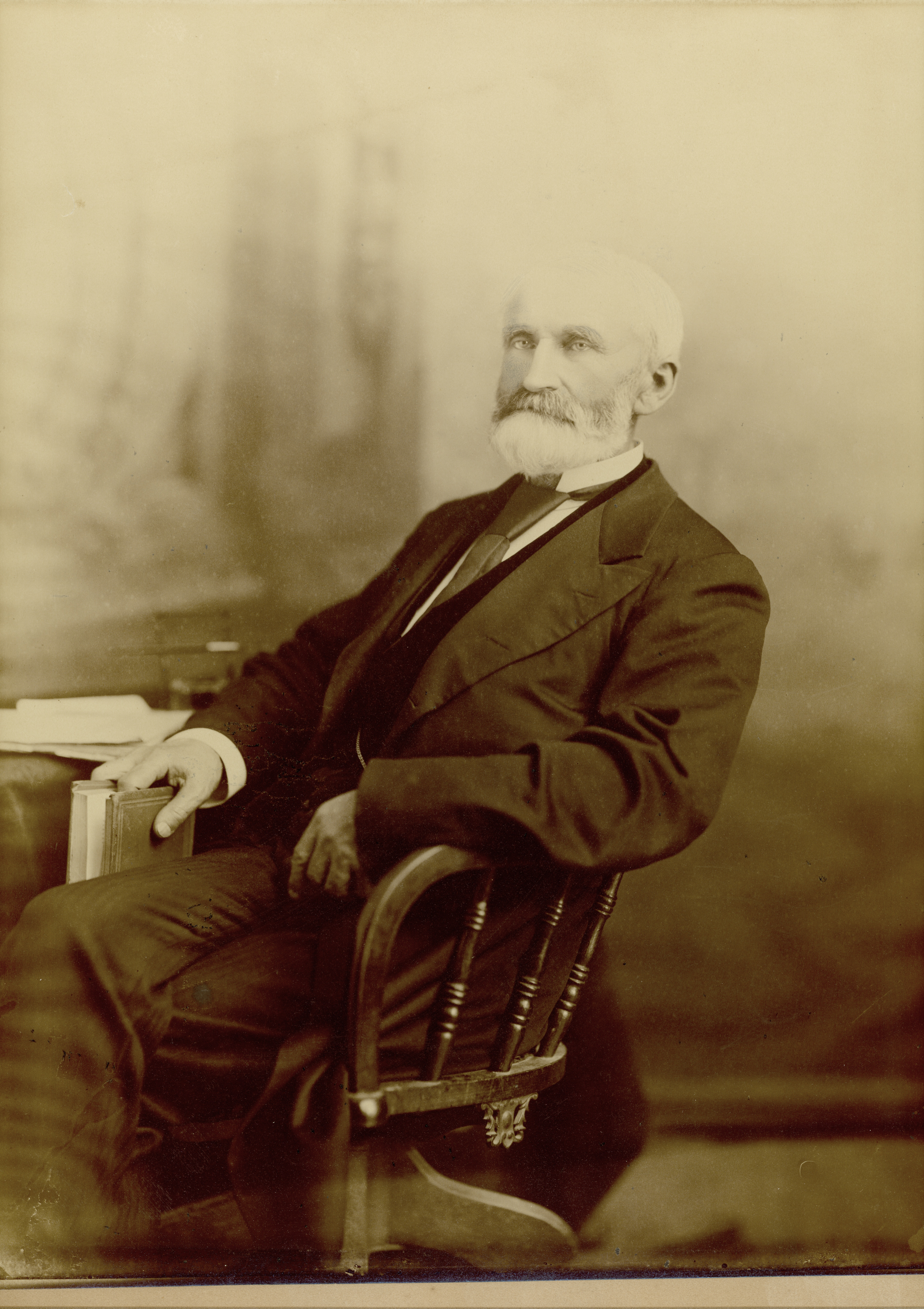

Judge of the United States District Court for the Western District of Missouri
- In office March 9, 1865 – June 9, 1888
- Appointed by: Abraham Lincoln
- Preceded by: Robert William Wells
- Succeeded by: John Finis Philips

Personal details
- Born: Arnold Krekel; March 12, 1815 Langenfeld, German Confederation
- Died: July 14, 1888 (aged 73) Kansas City, Missouri, US
- Education: St. Charles College read law

Arnold Krekel (March 12, 1815 – July 14, 1888) was a United States district judge of the United States District Court for the Western District of Missouri.

== Education and career ==
Born in Langenfeld, Prussia, German Confederation, Krekel emigrated to the United States in 1832 with his family, including his younger brother Nicholas Krekel.He attended St. Charles College and read law to enter the bar in 1844. He was a surveyor in St. Charles County, Missouri. He was a justice of the peace there from 1841 to 1843, and was in private practice beginning in 1844. He was a county and city attorney of St. Charles and St. Charles County from 1846 to 1850, and was editor of the abolitionist newspaper St. Charles Democrat from 1850 to 1864. He was a member of the Missouri House of Representatives in 1852. Krekel served in the Union Army throughout the American Civil War as colonel of a regiment of Missouri volunteers. He was President of the state constitutional convention in 1865, during which the Missouri emancipation proclamation was approved, formally abolishing slavery in Missouri.

== Federal judicial service ==
Krekel was nominated by President Abraham Lincoln on March 6, 1865, to a seat on the United States District Court for the Western District of Missouri vacated by Judge Robert William Wells. He was confirmed by the United States Senate on March 9, 1865, and received his commission the same day. His service terminated on June 9, 1888, due to his retirement.

=== Other service ===
Krekel was a lecturer for the University of Missouri School of Law in Columbia, Missouri, from 1872 to 1875. He was a founding Board Member of the Lincoln Institute (later Lincoln University) and helped raise funds for the institution along with James Milton Turner, an African-American reconstruction-era political leader and educator. He is also credited with naming O'Fallon, Missouri, located in St. Charles County and founded by his brother Nicholas, after a friend, John O'Fallon.

== Death ==
Krekel died on July 14, 1888, in Kansas City, Missouri.

== Sources ==
Legal offices
Preceded by Robert William Wells	Judge of the United States District Court for the Western District of Missouri; 1865–1888	Succeeded by John Finis Philips
