= 1880 Missouri gubernatorial election =

- November 2, 1880
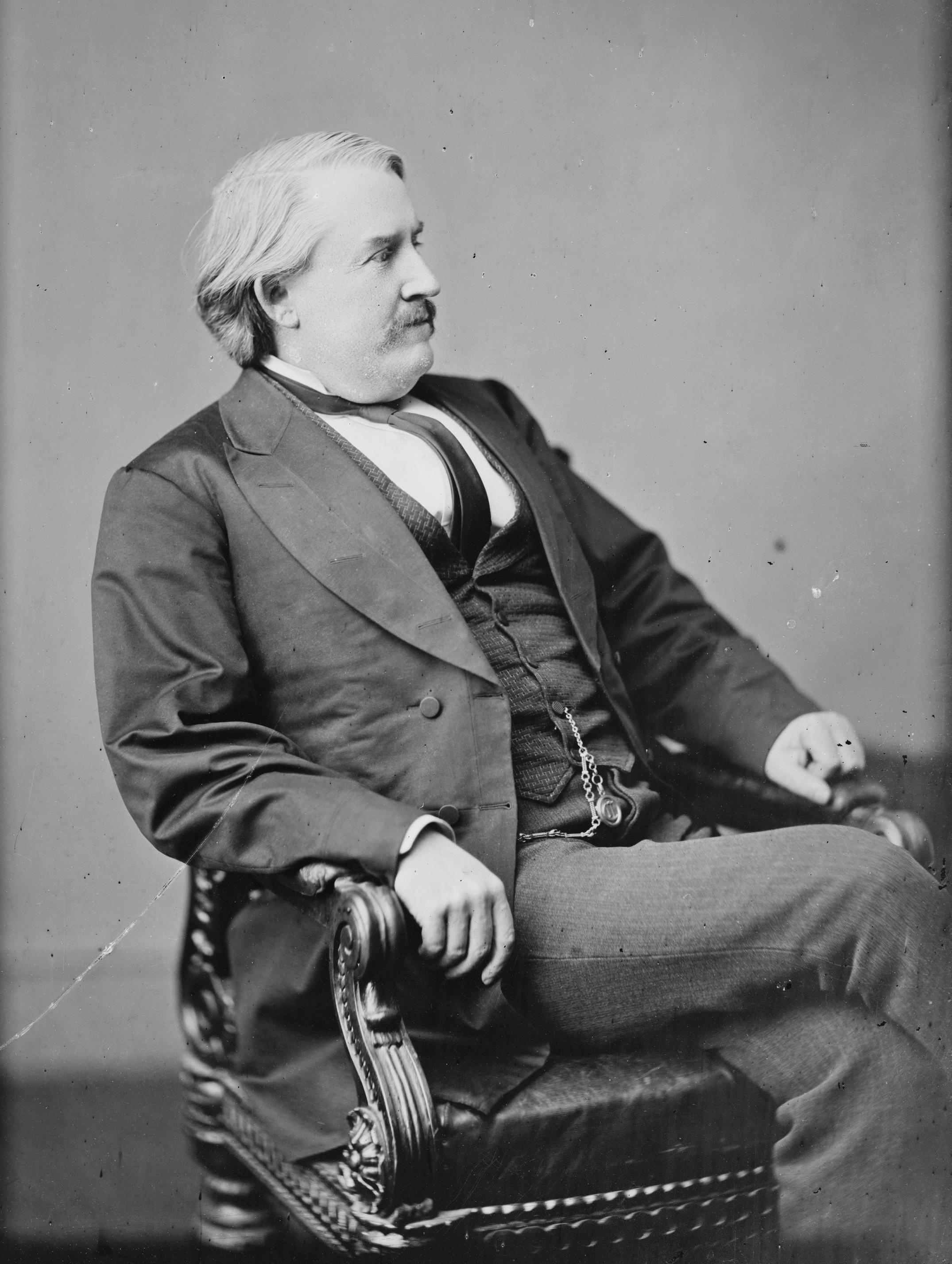

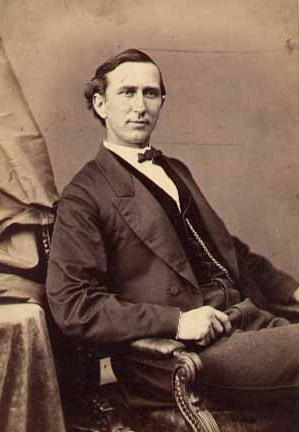

Nominee	Thomas Theodore Crittenden	David Patterson Dyer	Luman Brown
Party	Democratic	Republican	Greenback
Popular vote	207,670	153,636	36,340
Percentage	52.23%	38.64%	9.14%
- County results Crittenden: 40–50% 50–60% 60–70% 70–80% 80–90% Dyer: 30–40% 40–50% 50–60% 60–70% 70–80% Brown: 30–40% 40–50%
Governor before election
John S. Phelps
Democratic
Elected Governor
Thomas Theodore Crittenden
Democratic

The 1880 Missouri gubernatorial election was held on November 2, 1880, and resulted in a victory for the Democratic nominee, former Congressman Thomas Theodore Crittenden, over the Republican candidate, former Congressman David Patterson Dyer, and Greenback nominee Luman A. Brown.

Missouri returned to electing its governor to a 4-year term, instead of a 2-year term.

== Results ==
1880 gubernatorial election, Missouri
Party	Candidate	Votes	%	±%
Democratic	Thomas Theodore Crittenden	207,670	52.23	−4.76
Republican	David Patterson Dyer	153,636	38.64	−3.53
Greenback	Luman A. Brown	36,340	9.14	+8.29
Majority		54,034	13.59	−1.23
Turnout		397,646	18.34	
Democratic hold		Swing		
