= 1872–73 United States House of Representatives elections =

House elections for the 43rd U.S. Congress

- November 5, 1872 (Note: In the majority of states; 11 states held elections on different dates between June 4, 1872 and April 7, 1873.)

All 292 seats in the United States House of Representatives 147 seats needed for a majority
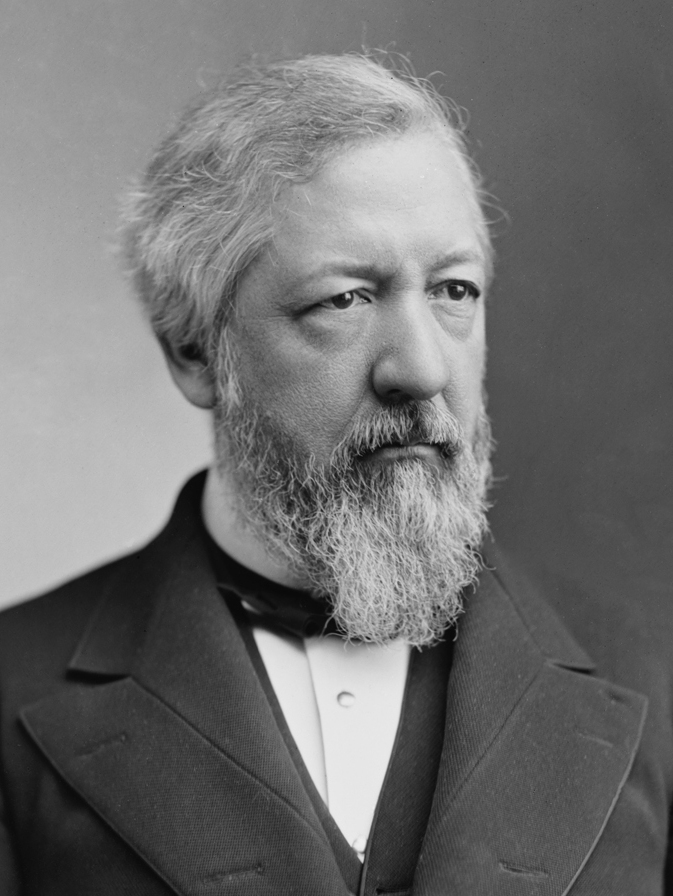

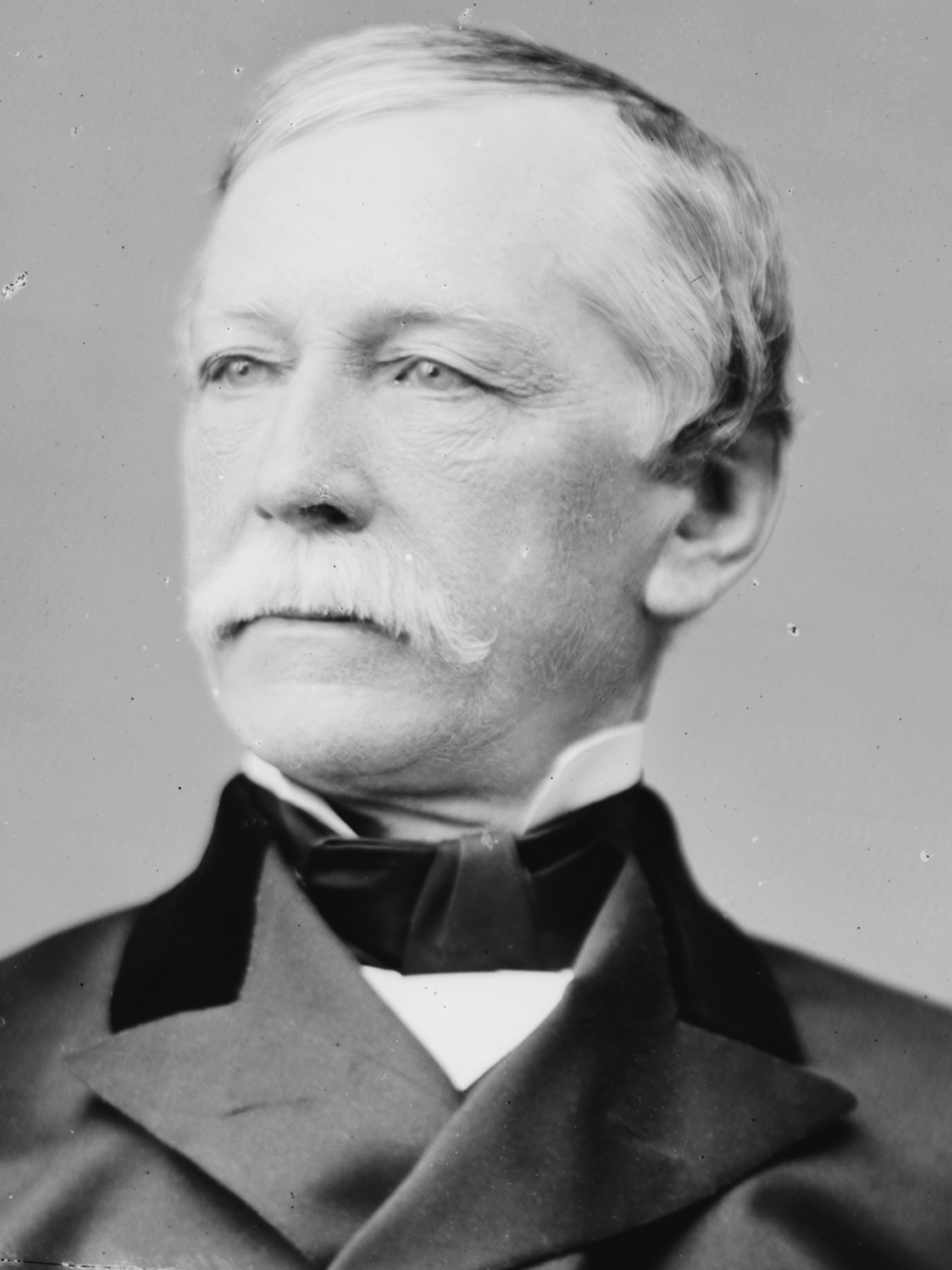
	Majority party	Minority party
Leader	James G. Blaine	Fernando Wood
Party	Republican	Democratic
Leader's seat	Maine 3rd	New York 10th
Last election	138 seats	94 seats
Seats won	199	84
Seat change	▲61	▼9
Popular vote	3,561,090	2,813,934
Percentage	51.40%	40.62%
Swing	▲3.26pp	▼2.77pp
	Third party	Fourth party
Party	Liberal Republican	Conservative
Last election	2 seats	10 seats
Seats won	4	4
Seat change	▲2	▼6
Popular vote	274,693	126,329
Percentage	3.97%	1.82%
Swing	▲3.07%	▼1.05pp
	Fifth party
Party	Independent
Last election	1 seat (Note: Includes 1 Independent Republican.)
Seats won	1 (Note: Includes 1 Independent Democrat, John James Davis, elected to WV-01.)
Seat change	Steady
Popular vote	151,757
Percentage	2.19%
Swing	▲0.45pp
- Results: Democratic hold Democratic gain Republican hold Republican gain Conservative hold Conservative gain Liberal Republican gain Independent Gain
Speaker before election
James G. Blaine
Republican
Elected Speaker
James G. Blaine
Republican

The 1872–73 United States House of Representatives elections were held on various dates in various states between June 4, 1872, and April 7, 1873. Each state set its own date for its elections to the House of Representatives before the first session of the 43rd United States Congress convened on December 1, 1873. They coincided with the re-election of United States President Ulysses S. Grant. The congressional reapportionment based on the 1870 United States census increased the number of House seats to 292.

Grant's Republican Party increased its majority greatly, partly at the expense of the opposition Democratic Party and partly by adding 49 new seats to the House. The proindustry outlook of the Republicans appealed to many Northern voters, especially as the post-war economy exploded, and this allowed the party to flourish as the Industrial Revolution grew more widespread. The Republicans also benefited from a continuing association with victory in the American Civil War, as well as disarray amongst Democratic leadership.

== Election summaries ==
Following the 1870 census, the House was reapportioned, initially adding 40 seats, followed by a subsequent amendment to the apportionment act adding another seat to 9 states, resulting in a total increase of 49 seats. No states lost seats, 10 states had no change, 13 states gained 1 seat each, 9 states gained 2 seats, 3 states gained 3 seats, 1 state gained 4 seats, and 1 state gained 5 seats. Prior to the supplemental act, two states (New Hampshire and Vermont) had each lost 1 seat. This was the first reapportionment after the repeal of the Three-fifths Compromise by the 14th Amendment.

This would prove the last time until 1966 that a Republican won a House seat in Arkansas.

↓
89	203
Democratic	Republican

State	Type	Total seats		Democratic		Republican	
State	Type	Seats	Change	Seats	Change	Seats	Change
Alabama	District + 2 at-large	8	▲2	2	▼1	6 (Note: Includes 1 Liberal Republican.)	▲3
Arkansas	District + at-large	4	▲1	0	▼1	4	▲2
California	District	4	▲1	1	▲1	3	Steady
Connecticut (Note: Elections held late.)	District	4	Steady	1	Steady	3	Steady
Delaware	At-large	1	Steady	0	▼1	1	▲1
Florida	At-large	2	▲1	0	Steady	2	▲1
Georgia	District	9	▲2	7	▲3	2	▼1
Illinois	District	19	▲5	5	▼1	14	▲6
Indiana (Note: Elections held early.)	District + 3 at-large	13	▲2	3	▼2	10	▲4
Iowa	District	9	▲3	0	Steady	9	▲3
Kansas	At-large	3	▲2	0	Steady	3	▲2
Kentucky	District	10	▲1	10	▲1	0	Steady
Louisiana	District + 1 at-large	6	▲1	0	Steady	6	▲1
Maine	District	5	Steady	0	Steady	5	Steady
Maryland	District	6	▲1	4	▼1	2	▲2
Massachusetts	District	11	▲1	0	Steady	11	▲1
Michigan	District	9	▲3	0	▼1	9	▲4
Minnesota	District	3	▲1	0	Steady	3	▲1
Mississippi	District	6	▲1	1	▲1	5	Steady
Missouri	District	13	▲4	9	▲5	4	▼1
Nebraska	At-large	1	Steady	0	Steady	1	Steady
Nevada	At-large	1	Steady	1	Steady	0	Steady
New Hampshire	District	3	Steady	1	▼2	2	▲2
New Jersey	District	7	▲2	1	▼1	6	▲3
New York	District + 1 at-large	33	▲2	9	▼7	24	▲9
North Carolina	District	8	▲1	5	Steady	3	▲1
Ohio	District	20	▲1	6	▲1	14	Steady
Oregon	At-large	1	Steady	0	▼1	1	▲1
Pennsylvania	District + 3 at-large	27	▲3	5	▼6	22	▲9
Rhode Island	District	2	Steady	0	Steady	2	Steady
South Carolina	District + 1 at-large	5	▲1	0	Steady	5	▲1
Tennessee	District + 1 at-large	10	▲2	3	▼3	7	▲5
Texas	District + 2 at-large	6	▲2	6	▲3	0	▼1
Vermont	District	3	Steady	0	Steady	3	Steady
Virginia	District	9	▲1	5	Steady	4	▲1
West Virginia	District	3	Steady	2	Steady	1	Steady
Wisconsin	District	8	▲2	2	Steady	6	▲2
Total		292	▲49	89 30.5%	▼13	203 (Note: Includes 4 Liberal Republicans.) 69.5%	▲62 30.5%

Popular vote
Republican	52.85%
Democratic	41.76%
Lib. Republican	4.08%
Conservative	1.87%
Independent	2.25%
Others	0.00%

House seats
Republican	67.92%
Democratic	29.01%
Lib. Republican	1.37%
Conservative	1.37%
Independent	0.34%

== Election dates ==
In 1845, Congress passed a law providing for a uniform nationwide date for choosing Presidential electors. This law did not affect election dates for Congress, which remained within the jurisdiction of State governments, but over time, the States moved their Congressional elections to this date as well. In 1872–73, there were still 9 states with earlier election dates, and 2 states with later election dates:

- Early elections (1872):
  - June 4 Oregon
  - August 1 North Carolina
  - August 27 West Virginia
  - September 3 Vermont
  - September 9 Maine
  - October 8 Indiana, Nebraska, Ohio, Pennsylvania
- Late elections (1873):
  - March 11, 1873 New Hampshire
  - April 7, 1873 Connecticut

== Special elections ==
District	Incumbent			This race	
District	Member	Party	First elected	Results	Candidates
Connecticut 1	Julius L. Strong	Republican	1869	Incumbent died September 7, 1872. New member elected November 5, 1872. Republican hold.	▌ ✓ Joseph R. Hawley (Republican) 51.2%; ▌William W. Eaton (Democratic) 48.8%

- Georgia 8: 1873
- Louisiana 4: 1872
- Louisiana 4: 1873
- Massachusetts 3: 1873
- Oregon at-large: 1873
- Pennsylvania 13: 1872

== Alabama ==
District	Incumbent			This race	
District	Member	Party	First elected	Results	Candidates
Alabama 1	Benjamin S. Turner	Republican	1870	Incumbent lost re-election. Liberal Republican gain.	▌ ✓ Frederick G. Bromberg (Liberal Republican) 43.59%; ▌Benjamin S. Turner (Republican) 36.79%; ▌Philip Joseph (Independent Republican) 19.62%
Alabama 2	Charles W. Buckley	Republican	1868	Incumbent retired. Republican hold.	▌ ✓ James T. Rapier (Republican) 54.46%; ▌William Calvin Oates (Democratic) 45.54%
Alabama 3	William Anderson Handley	Democratic	1870	Incumbent lost re-election. Republican gain.	▌ ✓ Charles Pelham (Republican) 51.00%; ▌William Anderson Handley (Democratic) 49.00%
Alabama 4	Charles Hays	Republican	1869	Incumbent re-elected.	▌ ✓ Charles Hays (Republican) 59.02%; ▌William R. Smith (Democratic) 40.99%
Alabama 5	Peter M. Dox	Democratic	1869	Incumbent retired. Democratic hold.	▌ ✓ John Henry Caldwell (Democratic) 62.62%; ▌Green D. Campbell (Republican) 37.38%
Alabama 6	Joseph Humphrey Sloss	Democratic	1870	Incumbent re-elected.	▌ ✓ Joseph Humphrey Sloss (Democratic) 66.91%; ▌Joel T. Parrish (Republican) 33.09%
Alabama at-large 2 seats on a general ticket	None (New seat)			New seat. Republican gain.	▌ ✓ Alexander White (Republican) 26.20%; ▌ ✓ Charles Christopher Sheats (Republican) 26.17%; ▌Alpheus S. Bailey (Democratic) 23.85%; ▌John J. Jolly (Democratic) 23.78%
Alabama at-large 2 seats on a general ticket	None (New seat)			New seat. Republican gain.	▌ ✓ Alexander White (Republican) 26.20%; ▌ ✓ Charles Christopher Sheats (Republican) 26.17%; ▌Alpheus S. Bailey (Democratic) 23.85%; ▌John J. Jolly (Democratic) 23.78%

== Arkansas ==
District	Incumbent			This race	
District	Member	Party	First elected	Results	Candidates
Arkansas 1	James M. Hanks	Democratic	1870	Incumbent retired. Republican gain.	▌Lucien C. Gause (Democratic) 54.1%; ▌ ✓ Asa Hodges (Republican) 46.0%
Arkansas 2	Oliver P. Snyder	Republican	1870	Incumbent re-elected.	▌ ✓ Oliver P. Snyder (Republican) 47.2%; ▌Marcus L. Bell (Democratic) 52.8%
Arkansas 3	Thomas Boles (Note: Thomas Boles lost election in 1870 to John Edwards, contested the election and was seated February 1872.)	Republican	1868	Incumbent retired. Republican hold.	▌Thomas M. Gunter (Democratic) 56.6%; ▌ ✓ William W. Wilshire (Republican) 43.4% (Note: Wilshire (Republican) was initially seated (and thus is counted towards the party totals at this article), but the election was contested and the seat was subsequently awarded to Gunter (Democratic) during the 40th Congress's first session.)
Arkansas at-large	None			Vacant since 32nd Congress (Civil War and Reconstruction); Liberal Republican gain.	▌ ✓ William J. Hynes (Liberal Republican) (Note: Represented the Brindle Tail Republican faction in Arkansas) 50.0%; ▌J. M. Bradley (Republican) (Note: Represented the Minstrel Republican faction in Arkansas) 49.4%

== California ==
A new seat was added, following the 1870 U.S. census, bringing the delegation up from three to four Representatives.

District	Incumbent			This race	
District	Representative	Party	First elected	Results	Candidates
California 1	None (new district)			New seat. Republican gain.	▌ ✓ Charles Clayton (Republican) 52.3%; ▌William A. Piper (Democratic) 47.7%
California 2	Aaron A. Sargent	Republican	1868	Incumbent retired. Republican hold.	▌ ✓ Horace F. Page (Republican) 51.8%; ▌Paschal Coggins (Liberal Republican / Democratic) 48.2%
California 3	John M. Coghlan	Republican	1871	Incumbent lost re-election. Democratic gain.	▌ ✓ John K. Luttrell (Democratic) 51.7%; ▌John M. Coghlan (Republican) 48.3%
California 4	Sherman O. Houghton; Redistricted from the 1st district	Republican	1871	Incumbent re-elected.	▌ ✓ Sherman O. Houghton (Republican) 53.6%; ▌ Edward J. C. Kewen (Democratic) 46.4%

== Connecticut ==
District	Incumbent			This race	
District	Member	Party	First elected	Results	Candidates
Connecticut 1	Joseph R. Hawley	Republican	1872 (special)	Incumbent re-elected.	▌ ✓ Julius L. Strong (Republican) 50.4%; ▌Simon B. Kendall (Democratic) 49.4%
Connecticut 2	Stephen Kellogg	Republican	1869	Incumbent re-elected.	▌ ✓ Stephen Kellogg (Republican) 50.1%; ▌James E. English (Democratic) 47.8%; ▌Arthur B. Caleff (Prohibition) 2.0%
Connecticut 3	Henry H. Starkweather	Republican	1867	Incumbent re-elected.	▌ ✓ Henry H. Starkweather (Republican) 53.4%; ▌James A. Bill (Democratic) 41.3%; ▌Elisha H. Palmer (Prohibition) 5.3%
Connecticut 4	William Barnum	Democratic	1867	Incumbent re-elected.	▌ ✓ William Barnum (Democratic) 52.9%; ▌William T. Minor (Republican) 45.5%; ▌William W. Perkins (Prohibition) 1.6%

== Delaware ==
Delaware election
- November 5, 1872
Nominee	James R. Lofland	Eustis Wright
Party	Republican	Democratic
Popular vote	11,378	11,023
Percentage	50.79%	49.21%
- County results Lofland: 50–60% Wright: 50–60%
U.S. Representative before election
Benjamin T. Biggs
Democratic
Elected U.S. Representative
James R. Lofland
Republican

The election was held November 5, 1872.

District	Incumbent			This race	
District	Member	Party	First elected	Results	Candidates
Delaware at-large	Benjamin T. Biggs	Democratic	1868	Incumbent retired. Republican gain.	▌ ✓ James R. Lofland (Republican) 50.8%; ▌Eustis Wright (Democratic) 49.2%

== Florida ==
Florida gained a second seat after the 1870 census, but delayed districting until 1874, electing both Representatives at-large for this election.

District	Incumbent			This race	
District	Representative	Party	First elected	Results	Candidates
Florida at-large 2 seats on a general ticket	Josiah T. Walls	Republican	1870	Incumbent re-elected.	▌ ✓ William J. Purman (Republican) 26.3%; ▌ ✓ Josiah T. Walls (Republican) 26.2%; ▌Silas L. Niblack (Democratic) 23.8%; ▌Charles W. Jones (Democratic) 23.7%
Florida at-large 2 seats on a general ticket	None (New seat)			New seat. Republican gain.	▌ ✓ William J. Purman (Republican) 26.3%; ▌ ✓ Josiah T. Walls (Republican) 26.2%; ▌Silas L. Niblack (Democratic) 23.8%; ▌Charles W. Jones (Democratic) 23.7%

== Georgia ==
District	Incumbent			This race	
District	Member	Party	First elected	Results	Candidates
Georgia 1	Archibald T. MacIntyre	Democratic	1870	Incumbent retired. Democratic hold.	▌ ✓ Morgan Rawls (Democratic) 54.4%; ▌ Andrew Sloan (Republican) 45.6%
Georgia 1	Archibald T. MacIntyre	Democratic	1870	Election successfully contested. New member seated March 24, 1874. Republican gain.	▌ ✓ Andrew Sloan (Republican); ▌ Morgan Rawls (Democratic)
Georgia 2	Richard H. Whiteley	Republican	1870	Incumbent re-elected.	▌ ✓ Richard H. Whiteley (Republican) 50.2%; ▌ G. L. Wright (Democratic) 49.8%
Georgia 3	None (new district)			New district. Democratic gain.	▌ ✓ Philip Cook (Democratic) 57.8%; ▌ John Brown (Republican) 42.2%
Georgia 4	John S. Bigby; Redistricted from the 3rd district.	Republican	1870	Incumbent lost renomination. Democratic gain.	▌ ✓ Henry R. Harris (Democratic) 54.9%; ▌ M. Bethune (Republican) 45.1%
Georgia 5	Thomas J. Speer; Redistricted from the 4th district.	Republican	1870	Incumbent died. Republican hold.	▌ ✓ James C. Freeman (Republican) 50.7%; ▌ Luther Glenn (Democratic) 49.4%
Georgia 6	None (new district)			New district. Democratic gain.	▌ ✓ James H. Blount (Democratic) 61.7%; ▌ L. B. Anderson (Republican) 38.3%
Georgia 7	Pierce M. B. Young	Democratic	1868	Incumbent re-elected.	▌ ✓ Pierce M. B. Young (Democratic) 64.5%; ▌ J. F. Dever (Republican) 35.5%
Georgia 8	Dudley M. DuBose; Redistricted from the 5th district.	Democratic	1870	Incumbent lost renomination and lost re-election as an Independent Democratic candidate. Winner died before start of term. Democratic hold.	▌ ✓ Ambrose R. Wright (Democratic) 56.3%; ▌ Philip Clayton (Republican) 36.2%; ▌ Dudley M. DuBose (Ind. Democratic) 7.5%
Georgia 9	William P. Price; Redistricted from the 6th district.	Democratic	1871	Incumbent retired. Democratic hold.	▌ ✓ Hiram Parks Bell (Democratic) 63.2%; ▌ [FNU] Darrell (Republican) 36.8%

== Illinois ==
District	Incumbent			This race	
District	Member	Party	First elected	Results	Candidates
Illinois 1	None (new district)			New district. Republican gain.	▌ ✓ John Blake Rice (Republican) 64.0%; ▌ Lucien B. Otis (Liberal Republican / Democratic) 36.0%
Illinois 2	None (new district)			New district. Republican gain.	▌ ✓ Jasper D. Ward (Republican) 57.9%; ▌ Carter Harrison III (Democratic / Liberal Republican) 42.1%
Illinois 3	Charles B. Farwell; Redistricted from the 1st district.	Republican	1870	Incumbent re-elected.	▌ ✓ Charles B. Farwell (Republican) 65.0%; ▌ John V. Le Moyne (Liberal Republican / Democratic) 35.0%
Illinois 3	John Lourie Beveridge; Redistricted from the at-large district.	Republican	1871	Incumbent resigned to become Lieutenant Governor of Illinois. Republican Loss.	▌ ✓ Charles B. Farwell (Republican) 65.0%; ▌ John V. Le Moyne (Liberal Republican / Democratic) 35.0%
Illinois 4	John F. Farnsworth; Redistricted from the 2nd district.	Republican	1862	Incumbent lost renomination. Republican hold.	▌ ✓ Stephen A. Hurlbut (Republican) 75.2%; ▌ Seymour G. Bronson (Liberal Republican / Democratic) 24.8%
Illinois 5	Horatio C. Burchard; Redistricted from the 3rd district.	Republican	1869	Incumbent re-elected.	▌ ✓ Horatio C. Burchard (Republican) 65.1%; ▌ James Dinsmoor (Liberal Republican / Democratic) 34.9%
Illinois 6	John B. Hawley; Redistricted from the 4th district.	Republican	1868	Incumbent re-elected.	▌ ✓ John B. Hawley (Republican) 64.5%; ▌ Calvin Truesdale (Liberal Republican / Democratic) 35.5%
Illinois 6	Bradford N. Stevens; Redistricted from the 5th district.	Democratic	1870	Incumbent retired. Democratic loss.	▌ ✓ John B. Hawley (Republican) 64.5%; ▌ Calvin Truesdale (Liberal Republican / Democratic) 35.5%
Illinois 7	Henry Snapp; Redistricted from the 6th district.	Republican	1871	Incumbent retired. Republican hold.	▌ ✓ Franklin Corwin (Republican) 59.9%; ▌ G. D. A. Parks (Liberal Republican / Democratic) 40.1%
Illinois 8	None (new district)			New district. Republican gain.	▌ ✓ Greenbury L. Fort (Republican) 61.7%; ▌ George O. Barnes (Democratic / Liberal Republican) 38.3%
Illinois 9	None (new district)			New district. Republican gain.	▌ ✓ Granville Barrere (Republican) 53.9%; ▌ Nicholas E. Worthington (Democratic / Liberal Republican) 46.2%
Illinois 10	None (new district)			New district. Republican gain.	▌ ✓ William H. Ray (Republican) 52.1%; ▌ William H. Neece (Democratic / Liberal Republican) 47.9%
Illinois 11	None (new district)			New district. Democratic gain.	▌ ✓ Robert M. Knapp (Democratic / Liberal Republican) 55.2%; ▌ Asa C. Matthews (Republican) 43.7%
Illinois 12	James Carroll Robinson; Redistricted from the 8th district.	Democratic	1870	Incumbent re-elected.	▌ ✓ James Carroll Robinson (Democratic / Liberal Republican) 51.8%; ▌ M. H. Chamberlain (Republican) 48.2%
Illinois 12	Thompson W. McNeely; Redistricted from the 9th district.	Democratic	1868	Incumbent retired. Democratic loss.	▌ ✓ James Carroll Robinson (Democratic / Liberal Republican) 51.8%; ▌ M. H. Chamberlain (Republican) 48.2%
Illinois 13	Jesse H. Moore; Redistricted from the 7th district.	Republican	1868	Incumbent lost renomination. Republican hold.	▌ ✓ John McNulta (Republican) 54.7%; ▌ Clifton H. Moore (Liberal Republican / Democratic) 44.0%
Illinois 14	None (new district)			New district. Republican gain.	▌ ✓ Joseph G. Cannon (Republican) 57.1%; ▌ William E. Nelson (Democratic / Liberal Republican) 42.9%
Illinois 15	None (new district)			New district. Democratic gain.	▌ ✓ John R. Eden (Democratic / Liberal Republican) 54.4%; ▌ George Hunt (Republican) 45.6%
Illinois 16	Edward Y. Rice; Redistricted from the 10th district.	Democratic	1870	Incumbent lost renomination. Republican gain.	▌ ✓ James Stewart Martin (Republican) 50.5%; ▌ Silas Bryan (Democratic / Liberal Republican) 49.5%
Illinois 17	John B. Hay; Redistricted from the 12th district.	Republican	1868	Incumbent lost re-election. Democratic gain.	▌ ✓ William R. Morrison (Democratic / Liberal Republican) 53.9%; ▌ John B. Hay (Republican) 46.1%
Illinois 18	None (new district)			New district. Republican gain.	▌ ✓ Isaac Clements (Republican) 53.1%; ▌ George W. Wall (Democratic / Liberal Republican) 46.9%
Illinois 19	Samuel S. Marshall; Redistricted from the 11th district.	Democratic	1864	Incumbent re-elected.	▌ ✓ Samuel S. Marshall (Democratic) 54.1%; ▌ Green B. Raum (Republican) 45.9%
Illinois 19	John M. Crebs; Redistricted from the 13th district.	Democratic	1868	Incumbent retired. Democratic loss.	▌ ✓ Samuel S. Marshall (Democratic) 54.1%; ▌ Green B. Raum (Republican) 45.9%

== Indiana ==
District	Incumbent			This race	
District	Member	Party	First elected	Results	Candidates
Indiana 1	William E. Niblack	Democratic	1864	Incumbent re-elected.	▌ ✓ William E. Niblack (Democratic) 50.2%; ▌ William Heilman (Republican) 49.8%
Indiana 2	None (Incumbent sought re-election in the at-large district)			Incumbent sought re-election in the at-large district. Democratic hold.	▌ ✓ Simeon K. Wolfe (Democratic) 58.6%; ▌ D. W. Voyles (Republican) 41.4%
Indiana 3	William S. Holman	Democratic	1866	Incumbent re-elected.	▌ ✓ William S. Holman (Democratic) 52.1%; ▌ William W. Herod (Republican) 47.9%
Indiana 4	Jeremiah M. Wilson	Republican	1870	Incumbent re-elected.	▌ ✓ Jeremiah M. Wilson (Republican) 50.7%; ▌ David S. Gooding (Democratic) 49.3%
Indiana 5	John Coburn	Republican	1866	Incumbent re-elected.	▌ ✓ John Coburn (Republican) 51.1%; ▌ Cyrus F. McNutt (Democratic) 48.9%
Indiana 6	Daniel W. Voorhees	Democratic	1868	Incumbent lost re-election. Republican gain.	▌ ✓ Morton C. Hunter (Republican) 50.9%; ▌ Daniel W. Voorhees (Democratic) 49.1%
Indiana 7	Mahlon Dickerson Manson	Democratic	1870	Incumbent lost re-election. Republican gain.	▌ ✓ Thomas J. Cason (Republican) 50.3%; ▌ Mahlon Dickerson Manson (Democratic) 49.7%
Indiana 8	James Noble Tyner	Republican	1868	Incumbent re-elected.	▌ ✓ James Noble Tyner (Republican) 54.0%; ▌ T. C. Whiteside (Democratic) 46.0%
Indiana 9	John P. C. Shanks	Republican	1866	Incumbent re-elected.	▌ ✓ John P. C. Shanks (Republican) 50.0%; ▌ John E. Neff (Democratic) 50.0%
Indiana 10	None (Incumbent sought re-election in the at-large district)			Incumbent sought re-election in the at-large district. Republican hold.	▌ ✓ Henry B. Sayler (Republican) 53.4%; ▌ E. Van Long (Democratic) 46.6%
Indiana 11	Jasper Packard	Republican	1868	Incumbent re-elected.	▌ ✓ Jasper Packard (Republican) 51.5%; ▌ J. A. Hendricks (Liberal Republican / Democratic) 48.5%
Indiana at-large 2 seats on a general ticket.	William Williams (Incumbent in the 10th district)	Republican	1866	Incumbent re-elected to the new seat. Republican gain.	▌ ✓ William Williams (Republican) 25.0%; ▌ ✓ Godlove S. Orth (Republican) 25.0%; ▌ Michael C. Kerr (Democratic) 25.0%; ▌ John S. Williams (Democratic) 25.0%
Indiana at-large 2 seats on a general ticket.	Michael C. Kerr (Incumbent in the 2nd district)	Democratic	1864	Incumbent lost re-election to the new seat. Republican gain.	▌ ✓ William Williams (Republican) 25.0%; ▌ ✓ Godlove S. Orth (Republican) 25.0%; ▌ Michael C. Kerr (Democratic) 25.0%; ▌ John S. Williams (Democratic) 25.0%

== Iowa ==
District	Incumbent			This race	
District	Member	Party	First elected	Results	Candidates
Iowa 1	George W. McCrary	Republican	1868	Incumbent re-elected.	▌ ✓ George W. McCrary (Republican) 58.0%; ▌ James Madison Shelley (Liberal Republican / Democratic) 42.0%
Iowa 2	Aylett R. Cotton	Republican	1870	Incumbent re-elected.	▌ ✓ Aylett R. Cotton (Republican) 50.4%; ▌ William Leffingwell (Democratic / Liberal Republican) 49.7%
Iowa 3	William G. Donnan	Republican	1870	Incumbent re-elected.	▌ ✓ William G. Donnan (Republican) 53.7%; ▌ John Thompson Stoneman (Democratic / Liberal Republican) 46.3%
Iowa 4	None (new district)			New district. Republican gain.	▌ ✓ Henry Otis Pratt (Republican) 77.0%; ▌ Adolph T. Lusch (Liberal Republican / Democratic) 22.6%
Iowa 5	None (new district)			New district. Republican gain.	▌ ✓ James Wilson (Republican) 67.6%; ▌ John P. Irish (Democratic / Liberal Republican) 32.4%
Iowa 6	Madison Miner Walden; Redistricted from the 4th district.	Republican	1870	Incumbent lost renomination. Republican hold.	▌ ✓ William Loughridge (Republican) 55.4%; ▌ Henry H. Trimble (Democratic / Liberal Republican) 44.3%
Iowa 7	Francis W. Palmer; Redistricted from the 5th district.	Republican	1868	Incumbent retired. Republican hold.	▌ ✓ John A. Kasson (Republican) 65.9%; ▌ O. L. Palmer (Democratic / Liberal Republican) 34.1%
Iowa 8	None (new district)			New district. Republican gain.	▌ ✓ James W. McDill (Republican) 64.4%; ▌ William W. Merritt (Liberal Republican / Democratic) 35.6%
Iowa 9	Jackson Orr; Redistricted from the 6th district.	Republican	1870	Incumbent re-elected.	▌ ✓ Jackson Orr (Republican) 66.8%; ▌ John F. Duncomb (Democratic / Liberal Republican) 33.1%

== Kansas ==
District	Incumbent			This race	
District	Member	Party	First elected	Results	Candidates
Kansas at-large 3 seats on a general ticket	David P. Lowe	Republican	1870	Incumbent re-elected.	▌ ✓ David P. Lowe (Republican) 22.3%; ▌ ✓ William A. Phillips (Republican) 22.2%; ▌ ✓ Stephen A. Cobb (Republican) 21.9%; ▌ Samuel A. Riggs (Democratic) 11.4%; ▌ Robert Byington Mitchell (Democratic) 11.2%; ▌ W. R. Laughlin (Democratic) 11.0%
Kansas at-large 3 seats on a general ticket	None (New seat)			New seat. Republican gain.	▌ ✓ David P. Lowe (Republican) 22.3%; ▌ ✓ William A. Phillips (Republican) 22.2%; ▌ ✓ Stephen A. Cobb (Republican) 21.9%; ▌ Samuel A. Riggs (Democratic) 11.4%; ▌ Robert Byington Mitchell (Democratic) 11.2%; ▌ W. R. Laughlin (Democratic) 11.0%
Kansas at-large 3 seats on a general ticket	None (New seat)			New seat. Republican gain.	▌ ✓ David P. Lowe (Republican) 22.3%; ▌ ✓ William A. Phillips (Republican) 22.2%; ▌ ✓ Stephen A. Cobb (Republican) 21.9%; ▌ Samuel A. Riggs (Democratic) 11.4%; ▌ Robert Byington Mitchell (Democratic) 11.2%; ▌ W. R. Laughlin (Democratic) 11.0%

== Kentucky ==
District	Incumbent			This race	
District	Member	Party	First elected	Results	Candidates
Kentucky 1	Edward Crossland	Democratic	1870	Incumbent re-elected.	▌ ✓ Edward Crossland (Democratic) 64.0%; ▌ J. H. Trabue (Ind. Republican) 15.6%; ▌ H. H. Houston (Republican) 11.2%; ▌ John Martin (Ind. Democratic) 9.2%
Kentucky 2	Henry D. McHenry	Democratic	1870	Incumbent retired. Democratic hold.	▌ ✓ John Y. Brown (Democratic) 95.3%; ▌ S. W. Langley (Republican) 4.7%
Kentucky 3	Joseph Horace Lewis	Democratic	1870	Incumbent retired. Democratic hold.	▌ ✓ Charles W. Milliken (Democratic) 64.3%; ▌ Jacob Golladay (Ind. Democratic) 35.5%
Kentucky 4	William B. Read	Democratic	1870	Incumbent re-elected.	▌ ✓ William B. Read (Democratic) 92.8%; ▌ E. H. Hobson (Republican) 6.2%
Kentucky 5	Boyd Winchester	Democratic	1868	Incumbent retired. Democratic hold.	▌ ✓ Elisha Standiford (Democratic) 68.9%; ▌ W. P. Boone (Republican) 31.1%
Kentucky 6	William Evans Arthur	Democratic	1870	Incumbent re-elected.	▌ ✓ William Evans Arthur (Democratic) 63.5%; ▌ Harvey Myers (Republican) 36.5%
Kentucky 7	James B. Beck	Democratic	1867	Incumbent re-elected.	▌ ✓ James B. Beck (Democratic) 68.9%; ▌ S. F. J. Trabue (Republican) 31.1%
Kentucky 8	None (new district)			New district. Democratic gain.	▌ ✓ Milton J. Durham (Democratic) 51.6%; ▌ William O'Connell Bradley (Republican) 48.4%
Kentucky 9	George Madison Adams; Redistricted from the 8th district.	Democratic	1867	Incumbent re-elected.	▌ ✓ George Madison Adams (Democratic) 54.2%; ▌ Andrew T. Wood (Republican) 45.9%
Kentucky 10	John McConnell Rice; Redistricted from the 9th district.	Democratic	1868	Incumbent retired. Democratic hold.	▌ ✓ John Duncan Young (Democratic) 50.5%; ▌ J. M. Burns (Republican) 49.5%

== Louisiana ==
In the newly formed at-large district, George A. Sheridan (Liberal Republican) beat P. B. S. Pinchback (Republican), the first black Governor of Louisiana. Pinchback challenged the election and it was settled in February 1875, in Sheridan's favor, only one month before the end of the Congress.

District	Incumbent			This race	
District	Member	Party	First elected	Results	Candidates
Louisiana 1	J. Hale Sypher	Republican	1870	Incumbent re-elected.	▌ ✓ J. Hale Sypher (Republican) 50.2%; ▌ Effingham Lawrence (Democratic) 49.9%
Louisiana 1	J. Hale Sypher	Republican	1870	Election successfully contested. New member seated March 3, 1875. Democratic gain.	▌ ✓ Effingham Lawrence (Democratic); ▌ J. Hale Sypher (Republican)
Louisiana 2	Lionel Allen Sheldon	Republican	1868	Incumbent re-elected.	▌ ✓ Lionel Allen Sheldon (Republican) 52.5%; ▌ Randall L. Gibson (Democratic) 47.5%
Louisiana 3	Chester Bidwell Darrall	Republican	1868	Incumbent re-elected.	▌ ✓ Chester Bidwell Darrall (Republican) 53.7%; ▌ J. B. Price (Democratic) 28.8%; ▌ Elbert Gantt (Liberal Republican) 17.5%
Louisiana 4	Alexander Boarman	Republican	1872	Incumbent retired. Representative-elect died before start of term. Republican hold.	▌ ✓ Samuel Peters (Republican) 64.0%; ▌ E. C. Davidson (Democratic) 36.0%
Louisiana 5	Frank Morey	Republican	1868	Incumbent re-elected.	▌ ✓ Frank Morey (Republican) 62.1%; ▌ G. W. McCraney (Democratic) 37.9%
Louisiana at-large	None (new district)			New district. Liberal Republican gain.	▌ ✓ George A. Sheridan (Liberal Republican) 55.1%; ▌ P. B. S. Pinchback (Republican) 44.9%
Louisiana at-large	None (new district)			Election contested. Seat declared vacant. George A. Sheridan seated March 3, 1875.	▌ ✓ George A. Sheridan (Liberal Republican) 55.1%; ▌ P. B. S. Pinchback (Republican) 44.9%

== Maine ==
District	Incumbent			This race	
District	Member	Party	First elected	Results	Candidates
Maine 1	John Lynch	Republican	1864	Incumbent retired. Republican hold.	▌ ✓ John H. Burleigh (Republican) 53.8%; ▌ W. H. Clifford (Democratic / Liberal Republican) 45.9%
Maine 2	William P. Frye	Republican	1870	Incumbent re-elected.	▌ ✓ William P. Frye (Republican) 59.1%; ▌ Alonzo Garcelon (Liberal Republican / Democratic) 40.8%
Maine 3	James G. Blaine	Republican	1862	Incumbent re-elected.	▌ ✓ James G. Blaine (Republican) 56.6%; ▌ T. S. Lang (Liberal Republican / Democratic) 43.4%
Maine 4	John A. Peters	Republican	1866	Incumbent retired. Republican hold.	▌ ✓ Samuel F. Hersey (Republican) 61.3%; ▌ Marcellus Emery (Democratic / Liberal Republican) 38.7%
Maine 5	Eugene Hale	Republican	1868	Incumbent re-elected.	▌ ✓ Eugene Hale (Republican) 55.7%; ▌ Frederick A. Pike (Liberal Republican / Democratic) 44.3%

== Maryland ==
District	Incumbent			This race	
District	Member	Party	First elected	Results	Candidates
Maryland 1	Samuel Hambleton	Democratic	1868	Incumbent retired. Democratic hold.	▌ ✓ Ephraim K. Wilson II (Democratic) 51.3%; ▌ Thomas A. Spence (Republican) 48.7%
Maryland 2	Stevenson Archer	Democratic	1866	Incumbent re-elected.	▌ ✓ Stevenson Archer (Democratic) 50.7%; ▌ A. M. Hancock (Republican) 49.3%
Maryland 3	None (new district)			New district. Democratic gain.	▌ ✓ William J. O'Brien (Democratic) 53.7%; ▌ R. Turner (Republican) 46.3%
Maryland 4	Thomas Swann; Redistricted from the 3rd district.	Democratic	1868	Incumbent re-elected.	▌ ✓ Thomas Swann (Democratic) 52.7%; ▌ E. Griswold (Republican) 47.3%
Maryland 5	William Matthews Merrick	Democratic	1870	Incumbent lost re-election. Republican gain.	▌ ✓ William Albert (Republican) 52.6%; ▌ William Matthews Merrick (Democratic) 47.5%
Maryland 6	John Ritchie; Redistricted from the 4th district.	Democratic	1870	Incumbent lost re-election. Republican gain.	▌ ✓ Lloyd Lowndes Jr. (Republican) 53.2%; ▌ John Ritchie (Democratic) 46.8%

== Massachusetts ==
District	Incumbent			This race	
District	Member	Party	First elected	Results	Candidates
Massachusetts 1	James Buffinton	Republican	1868	Incumbent re-elected.	▌ ✓ James Buffinton (Republican) 82.6%; ▌ Joseph M. Day (Democratic / Liberal Republican) 17.3%
Massachusetts 2	Oakes Ames	Republican	1862	Incumbent retired. Republican hold.	▌ ✓ Benjamin W. Harris (Republican) 73.0%; ▌ Edward Avery (Democratic / Liberal Republican) 27.0%
Massachusetts 3	None (new district)			New district. Republican gain.	▌ ✓ William Whiting (Republican) 63.4%; ▌ Samuel C. Cobb (Liberal Republican / Democratic) 36.5%
Massachusetts 4	Samuel Hooper	Republican	1861	Incumbent re-elected.	▌ ✓ Samuel Hooper (Republican) 58.1%; ▌ Leopold Morse (Democratic / Liberal Republican) 41.8%
Massachusetts 5	Nathaniel P. Banks; Redistricted from the 6th district.	Republican	1865	Incumbent lost re-election as a Liberal Republican candidate. Republican hold.	▌ ✓ Daniel W. Gooch (Republican) 60.8%; ▌ Nathaniel P. Banks (Liberal Republican / Democratic) 39.2%
Massachusetts 6	Benjamin Butler; Redistricted from the 5th district.	Republican	1866	Incumbent re-elected.	▌ ✓ Benjamin Butler (Republican) 67.2%; ▌ Charles P. Thompson (Democratic / Liberal Republican) 32.5%
Massachusetts 7	Constantine C. Esty	Republican	1872	Incumbent retired. Republican hold.	▌ ✓ Ebenezer R. Hoar (Republican) 64.9%; ▌ John K. Tarbox (Democratic / Liberal Republican) 33.1%
Massachusetts 8	Ginery Twichell; Redistricted from the 3rd district.	Republican	1866	Incumbent retired. Republican hold.	▌ ✓ John M. S. Williams (Republican) 67.2%; ▌ William W. Warren (Democratic / Liberal Republican) 32.8%
Massachusetts 9	George F. Hoar; Redistricted from the 8th district.	Republican	1868	Incumbent re-elected.	▌ ✓ George F. Hoar (Republican) 71.0%; ▌ George F. Verry (Democratic / Liberal Republican) 28.0%
Massachusetts 10	Alvah Crocker; Redistricted from the 9th district.	Republican	1872	Incumbent re-elected.	▌ Alvah Crocker (Republican) 76.4%; ▌ D. W. Bond (Democratic / Liberal Republican) 23.5%
Massachusetts 11	Henry L. Dawes; Redistricted from the 10th district.	Republican	1856	Incumbent re-elected.	▌ Henry L. Dawes (Republican) 63.9%; ▌ John F. Arnold (Democratic / Liberal Republican) 36.1%

== Michigan ==
District	Incumbent			This race	
District	Member	Party	First elected	Results	Candidates
Michigan 1	None (new district)			New district. Republican gain.	▌ ✓ Moses W. Field (Republican) 53.8%; ▌ M. L. Bagg (Liberal Republican / Democratic) 45.3%; ▌ Lester H. Brown (Straight Democratic) 0.9%
Michigan 2	Henry Waldron; Redistricted from the 1st district.	Republican	1870	Incumbent re-elected.	▌ ✓ Henry Waldron (Republican) 62.4%; ▌ A. Mahan (Liberal Republican / Democratic) 37.6%
Michigan 3	Austin Blair	Republican	1866	Incumbent retired to run for Governor of Michigan. Republican hold.	▌ ✓ George Willard (Republican) 62.6%; ▌ John G. Parkhurst (Democratic / Liberal Republican) 36.1%
Michigan 4	William L. Stoughton; Redistricted from the 2nd district.	Republican	1868	Incumbent retired. Republican hold.	▌ ✓ Julius C. Burrows (Republican) 59.3%; ▌ Allen Potter (Liberal Republican / Democratic) 40.6%
Michigan 5	Wilder D. Foster; Redistricted from the 4th district.	Republican	1871	Incumbent re-elected.	▌ ✓ Wilder D. Foster (Republican) 66.5%; ▌ [FNU] McReynolds (Democratic / Liberal Republican) 33.5%
Michigan 6	None (new district)			New district. Republican gain.	▌ ✓ Josiah Begole (Republican) 58.0%; ▌ Augustus C. Baldwin (Democratic / Liberal Republican) 41.6%
Michigan 7	Omar D. Conger; Redistricted from the 5th district.	Republican	1868	Incumbent re-elected.	▌ ✓ Omar D. Conger (Republican) 60.5%; ▌ John H. Richardson (Democratic / Liberal Republican) 39.2%
Michigan 8	Jabez G. Sutherland; Redistricted from the 6th district.	Democratic	1870	Incumbent retired. Republican gain.	▌ ✓ Nathan B. Bradley (Republican) 58.0%; ▌ Chauncey W. Wisner (Liberal Republican / Democratic) 40.9%
Michigan 9	None (new district)			New district. Republican gain.	▌ ✓ Jay A. Hubbell (Republican) 68.3%; ▌ Samuel P. Ely (Liberal Republican / Democratic) 31.7%

== Minnesota ==
District	Incumbent			This race	
District	Member	Party	First elected	Results	Candidates
Minnesota 1	Mark H. Dunnell	Republican	1870	Incumbent re-elected.	▌ ✓ Mark H. Dunnell (Republican) 65.6%; ▌ Morton S. Wilkinson (Liberal Republican / Democratic) 34.4%
Minnesota 2	None (new district)			New district. Republican gain.	▌ ✓ Horace B. Strait (Republican) 57.4%; ▌ Christopher C. Graham (Democratic / Liberal Republican) 42.6%
Minnesota 3	John T. Averill; Redistricted from the 2nd district.	Republican	1870	Incumbent re-elected.	▌ ✓ John T. Averill (Republican) 60.7%; ▌ George L. Becker (Democratic / Liberal Republican) 39.3%

== Mississippi ==
District	Incumbent			This race	
District	Member	Party	First elected	Results	Candidates
Mississippi 1	George E. Harris	Republican	1869	Incumbent retired. Democratic gain.	▌ ✓ Lucius Q. C. Lamar (Democratic) 66.15%; ▌R. W. Flournoy (Republican) 33.86%
Mississippi 2	Joseph L. Morphis	Republican	1869	Incumbent lost renomination. Republican hold.	▌ ✓ Albert R. Howe (Republican) 63.94%; ▌William A. Alcorn (Democratic) 35.42%; Scattering 0.64%
Mississippi 3	Henry W. Barry	Republican	1869	Incumbent re-elected.	▌ ✓ Henry W. Barry (Republican) 69.14%; ▌W. S. Bolling (Democratic) 29.59%; Scattering 1.27%
Mississippi 4	None (new district)			New district. Republican gain.	▌ ✓ Jason Niles (Republican) 83.38%; ▌S. T. Oldham (Unknown) 11.87%; ▌[FNU] Harmon (Unknown) 4.18%; ▌W. B. Shelby (Unknown) 0.57%
Mississippi 5	Legrand W. Perce	Republican	1869	Incumbent retired. Republican loss.	▌ ✓ George C. McKee (Republican) 64.73%; ▌W. B. Shelby (Democratic) 35.27%
Mississippi 5	George C. McKee; Redistricted from the 4th district.	Republican	1869	Incumbent re-elected.	▌ ✓ George C. McKee (Republican) 64.73%; ▌W. B. Shelby (Democratic) 35.27%
Mississippi 6	None (new district)			New district. Republican gain.	▌ ✓ John R. Lynch (Republican) 64.16%; ▌Hiram Cassidy (Democratic) 35.84%

== Missouri ==
District	Incumbent			This race	
District	Member	Party	First elected	Results	Candidates
Missouri 1	Gustavus Finkelnburg; Redistricted from the 2nd district.	Liberal Republican	1868	Incumbent retired. Republican gain.	▌ ✓ Edwin O. Stanard (Republican) 50.7%; ▌ William M. Grosvenor (Liberal Republican / Democratic) 49.3%
Missouri 2	Erastus Wells; Redistricted from the 1st district.	Democratic	1868	Incumbent re-elected.	▌ ✓ Erastus Wells (Democratic / Liberal Republican) 58.7%; ▌ Michael A. Bryson (Republican) 41.3%
Missouri 3	None (new district)			New district. Democratic gain.	▌ ✓ William Henry Stone (Democratic / Liberal Republican) 44.5%; ▌ Manetho Hilton (Republican) 41.8%; ▌ James J. McBride (Independent Democratic) 13.7%
Missouri 4	James R. McCormick; Redistricted from the 3rd district.	Democratic	1867	Incumbent retired. Democratic hold.	▌ ✓ Robert A. Hatcher (Democratic / Liberal Republican) 74.4%; ▌ Messer Ward (Indepedent Democratic / Republican) 25.6%
Missouri 5	None (new district)			New district. Democratic gain.	▌ ✓ Richard P. Bland (Democratic / Liberal Republican) 53.1%; ▌ Abraham Jefferson Seay (Republican) 46.9%
Missouri 6	Harrison E. Havens; Redistricted from the 4th district.	Republican	1870	Incumbent re-elected.	▌ ✓ Harrison E. Havens (Republican) 51.1%; ▌ Charles B. McAffee (Democratic / Liberal Republican) 48.9%
Missouri 7	Samuel Swinfin Burdett; Redistricted from the 5th district.	Republican	1868	Incumbent lost re-election. Democratic gain.	▌ ✓ Thomas T. Crittenden (Democratic / Liberal Republican) 52.5%; ▌ Samuel Swinfin Burdett (Republican) 47.8%
Missouri 8	Abram Comingo; Redistricted from the 6th district.	Democratic	1870	Incumbent re-elected.	▌ ✓ Abram Comingo (Democratic / Liberal Republican) 64.4%; ▌ Daniel W. Twichell (Republican) 35.6%
Missouri 9	Isaac C. Parker; Redistricted from the 7th district.	Republican	1870	Incumbent re-elected.	▌ ✓ Isaac C. Parker (Republican) 50.2%; ▌ Bennett Pike (Democratic / Liberal Republican) 49.8%
Missouri 10	None (new district)			New district. Republican gain.	▌ ✓ Ira B. Hyde (Republican) 53.1%; ▌ Charles H. Mansur (Democratic / Liberal Republican) 46.9%
Missouri 11	None (new district)			New district. Democratic gain.	▌ ✓ John B. Clark Jr. (Democratic / Liberal Republican) 67.7%; ▌ Mark L. De Motte (Republican) 32.3%
Missouri 12	James G. Blair; Redistricted from the 8th district.	Liberal Republican	1870	Incumbent retired. Democratic gain.	▌ ✓ John M. Glover (Democratic / Liberal Republican) 54.9%; ▌ John F. Benjamin (Republican) 45.1%
Missouri 13	Andrew King; Redistricted from the 9th district.	Democratic	1870	Incumbent retired. Democratic hold.	▌ ✓ Aylett H. Buckner (Democratic / Liberal Republican) 67.8%; ▌ Thomas J. Flagg (Republican) 32.2%

== Nebraska ==
District	Incumbent			This race	
District	Member	Party	First elected	Results	Candidates
Nebraska at-large	John Taffe	Republican	1866	Incumbent retired. Republican hold.	▌ ✓ Lorenzo Crounse (Republican) 62.19%; ▌Jesse F. Warner (Democratic) 37.81%

== Nevada ==
The election was held November 5, 1872.

District	Incumbent			This race	
District	Member	Party	First elected	Results	Candidates
Nevada at-large	Charles West Kendall	Democratic	1870	Incumbent re-elected.	▌ ✓ Charles West Kendall (Democratic) 52.34%; ▌C.C. Goodwin (Republican) 47.66%

== New Hampshire ==
Elections were held March 11, 1873, After the March 4th beginning of the term.

District	Incumbent			This race	
District	Member	Party	First elected	Results	Candidates
New Hampshire 1	Ellery Albee Hibbard	Democratic	1871	Incumbent lost re-election. Republican gain.	▌ ✓ William B. Small (Republican) 49.87%; ▌Ellery Albee Hibbard (Democratic) 48.31%; ▌Albert Comings (Temperance) 1.83%
New Hampshire 2	Samuel Newell Bell	Democratic	1871	Incumbent lost re-election. Republican gain.	▌ ✓ Austin F. Pike (Republican) 49.31%; ▌Samuel Newell Bell (Democratic) 49.28%; ▌Josiah M. Fletcher (Temperance) 1.42%
New Hampshire 3	Hosea W. Parker	Democratic	1871	Incumbent re-elected.	▌ ✓ Hosea W. Parker (Democratic) 49.92%; ▌ Simon Goodell Griffin (Republican) 48.34%; ▌Anthony Hardy (Liberal) 0.87%; ▌Josiah M. Fletcher (Temperance) 0.87%

== New Jersey ==
District	Incumbent			This race	
District	Member	Party	First elected	Results	Candidates
New Jersey 1	John W. Hazelton	Republican	1870	Incumbent re-elected.	▌ ✓ John W. Hazelton (Republican) 63.12%; ▌ Oscar A. Clute (Liberal Republican / Democratic) 36.88%
New Jersey 2	Samuel C. Forker	Democratic	1870	Incumbent lost re-election. Republican gain.	▌ ✓ Samuel A. Dobbins (Republican) 54.63%; ▌Samuel C. Forker (Democratic / Liberal Republican) 45.37%
New Jersey 3	None (new district)			New seat. Republican gain.	▌ ✓ Amos Clark Jr. (Republican) 53.97%; ▌ John H. Patterson (Democratic / Liberal Republican) 46.03%
New Jersey 4	John T. Bird; Redistricted from the 3rd district.	Democratic	1868	Incumbent retired. Democratic hold.	▌ ✓ Robert Hamilton (Democratic / Liberal Republican) 55.24%; ▌ Frederic A. Potts (Republican) 44.76%
New Jersey 5	John Hill; Redistricted from the 4th district.	Republican	1866	Incumbent retired. Republican hold.	▌ ✓ William Walter Phelps (Republican) 55.98%; ▌ A. B. Woodruff (Democratic / Liberal Republican) 44.02%
New Jersey 6	None (new district)			New seat. Republican gain.	▌ ✓ Marcus Lawrence Ward (Republican) 60.69%; ▌ John M. Randall (Liberal Republican / Democratic) 39.31%
New Jersey 7	George A. Halsey; Redistricted from the 5th district.	Republican	1870	Incumbent retired. Republican hold.	▌ ✓ Isaac W. Scudder (Republican) 53.26%; ▌ Noah D. Taylor (Democratic / Liberal Republican) 46.74%

== New York ==
District	Incumbent			This race	
District	Member	Party	First elected	Results	Candidates
New York 1	Dwight Townsend	Democratic	1870	Incumbent retired. Republican gain.	▌ ✓ Henry J. Scudder (Republican) 54.1%; ▌ James W. Covert (Democratic / Liberal Republican) 46.0%
New York 2	Thomas Kinsella	Democratic	1870	Incumbent retired. Democratic hold.	▌ ✓ John G. Schumaker (Democratic / Liberal Republican) 58.7%; ▌ Andrew J. Perry (Republican) 36.8%; ▌ William Erigena Robinson (Independent Democratic) 4.5%
New York 3	Henry Warner Slocum	Democratic	1868	Incumbent retired. Republican gain.	▌ ✓ Stewart L. Woodford (Republican) 56.9%; ▌ William W. Goodrich (Democratic / Liberal Republican) 43.1%
New York 4	None (new district)			New district. Republican gain.	▌ ✓ Philip S. Crooke (Republican) 51.9%; ▌ Stephen J. Colahan (Democratic / Liberal Republican) 48.1%
New York 5	William R. Roberts	Democratic	1870	Incumbent re-elected.	▌ ✓ William R. Roberts (Democratic / Liberal Republican) 79.1%; ▌ Matthew Stewart (Republican) 20.9%
New York 5	Robert Roosevelt; Redistricted from the 4th district.	Democratic	1870	Incumbent retired. Democratic loss.	▌ ✓ William R. Roberts (Democratic / Liberal Republican) 79.1%; ▌ Matthew Stewart (Republican) 20.9%
New York 6	James Brooks; Redistricted from the 8th district.	Democratic	1866	Incumbent re-elected.	▌ ✓ James Brooks (Democratic / Liberal Republican) 76.9%; ▌ Adolph G. Dunn (Republican) 23.1%
New York 7	Smith Ely Jr.	Democratic	1870	Incumbent retired. Democratic hold.	▌ ✓ Thomas J. Creamer (Democratic / Liberal Republican) 54.7%; ▌ Conrad Geib (Republican) 45.3%
New York 8	None (new district)			New district. Republican gain.	▌ ✓ John D. Lawson (Republican) 58.6%; ▌ Charles P. Shaw (Democratic / Liberal Republican) 41.1%
New York 9	None (new district)			New district. Republican gain.	▌ ✓ David B. Mellish (Republican) 37.8%; ▌ John Hardy (Apollo Hall Democratic) 34.1%; ▌ Michael Connolly (Tammany Hall Democratic) 28.2%
New York 10	Fernando Wood; Redistricted from the 9th district.	Democratic	1866	Incumbent re-elected.	▌ ✓ Fernando Wood (Democratic / Liberal Republican) 52.2%; ▌ William Augustus Darling (Republican) 47.8%
New York 11	Clarkson Nott Potter; Redistricted from the 10th district.	Democratic	1868	Incumbent re-elected.	▌ ✓ Clarkson Nott Potter (Democratic / Liberal Republican) 51.7%; ▌ Ethan Flagg (Republican) 48.3%
New York 12	Charles St. John; Redistricted from the 11th district.	Republican	1870	Incumbent re-elected.	▌ ✓ Charles St. John (Republican) 51.1%; ▌ Charles H. Horton (Democratic / Liberal Republican) 48.9%
New York 13	John H. Ketcham; Redistricted from the 12th district.	Republican	1864	Incumbent lost re-election. Democratic gain.	▌ ✓ John O. Whitehouse (Democratic / Liberal Republican) 51.6%; ▌ John H. Ketcham (Republican) 48.4%
New York 14	Joseph H. Tuthill; Redistricted from the 13th district.	Democratic	1870	Incumbent retired. Democratic hold.	▌ ✓ David M. De Witt (Democratic / Liberal Republican) 50.0%; ▌ John Maxwell (Republican) 50.0%
New York 15	Eli Perry; Redistricted from the 14th district.	Democratic	1870	Incumbent re-elected.	▌ ✓ Eli Perry (Democratic / Liberal Republican) 51.6%; ▌ Charles H. Adams (Republican) 48.4%
New York 16	Joseph M. Warren; Redistricted from the 15th district.	Democratic	1870	Incumbent retired. Republican gain.	▌ ✓ James S. Smart (Republican) 57.2%; ▌ Adin Thayer (Democratic / Liberal Republican) 42.8%
New York 17	John Rogers; Redistricted from the 16th district.	Democratic	1870	Incumbent retired. Republican gain.	▌ ✓ Robert S. Hale (Republican) 57.4%; ▌ Rufus Heaton (Democratic / Liberal Republican) 42.6%
New York 18	William A. Wheeler; Redistricted from the 17th district.	Republican	1868	Incumbent re-elected.	▌ ✓ William A. Wheeler (Republican) 69.2%; ▌ William P. Cantwell (Democratic / Liberal Republican) 30.8%
New York 19	John M. Carroll; Redistricted from the 18th district.	Democratic	1870	Incumbent retired. Republican gain.	▌ ✓ Henry H. Hathorn (Republican) 54.6%; ▌ David B. Judson (Liberal Republican / Democratic) 45.4%
New York 20	Elizur H. Prindle; Redistricted from the 19th district.	Republican	1870	Incumbent retired. Republican hold.	▌ ✓ David Wilber (Republican) 53.4%; ▌ Hezekiah Sturgis (Democratic / Liberal Republican) 46.6%
New York 21	Clinton L. Merriam; Redistricted from the 20th district.	Republican	1870	Incumbent re-elected.	▌ ✓ Clinton L. Merriam (Republican) 56.7%; ▌ Beman Brockway (Liberal Republican / Democratic) 43.3%
New York 22	Ellis H. Roberts; Redistricted from the 21st district.	Republican	1870	Incumbent re-elected.	▌ ✓ Ellis H. Roberts (Republican) 55.9%; ▌ Richard U. Sherman (Liberal Republican / Democratic) 44.1%
New York 23	William E. Lansing; Redistricted from the 22nd district.	Republican	1870	Incumbent re-elected.	▌ ✓ William E. Lansing (Republican) 58.7%; ▌ Henry A. Foster (Democratic / Liberal Republican) 41.3%
New York 24	R. Holland Duell; Redistricted from the 23rd district.	Republican	1870	Incumbent re-elected.	▌ ✓ R. Holland Duell (Republican) 53.8%; ▌ Frank Hiscock (Liberal Republican / Democratic) 46.2%
New York 25	John E. Seeley; Redistricted from the 24th district.	Republican	1870	Incumbent retired. Republican hold.	▌ ✓ Clinton D. MacDougall (Republican) 57.2%; ▌ William T. Graves (Liberal Republican / Democratic) 42.8%
New York 26	William H. Lamport; Redistricted from the 25th district.	Republican	1870	Incumbent re-elected.	▌ ✓ William H. Lamport (Republican) 57.0%; ▌ William M. White (Liberal Republican / Democratic) 43.0%
New York 27	Milo Goodrich; Redistricted from the 26th district.	Republican	1870	Incumbent lost re-election as a Liberal Republican candidate. Republican hold.	▌ ✓ Thomas C. Platt (Republican) 55.3%; ▌ Milo Goodrich (Liberal Republican / Democratic) 44.7%
New York 28	Horace B. Smith; Redistricted from the 27th district.	Republican	1870	Incumbent re-elected.	▌ ✓ Horace B. Smith (Republican) 56.8%; ▌ Stephen T. Hayt (Liberal Republican / Democratic) 43.2%
New York 29	Freeman Clarke; Redistricted from the 28th district.	Republican	1870	Incumbent re-elected.	▌ ✓ Freeman Clarke (Republican) 56.7%; ▌ Luther Gordon (Democratic / Liberal Republican) 43.3%
New York 30	Seth Wakeman; Redistricted from the 29th district.	Republican	1870	Incumbent retired. Republican hold.	▌ ✓ George Gilbert Hoskins (Republican) 58.0%; ▌ Mortimer M. Southworth (Liberal Republican / Democratic) 42.0%
New York 31	William Williams; Redistricted from the 30th district.	Democratic	1870	Incumbent lost re-election. Republican gain.	▌ ✓ Lyman K. Bass (Republican) 58.3%; ▌ William Williams (Democratic / Liberal Republican) 41.7%
New York 32	Walter L. Sessions; Redistricted from the 31st district.	Republican	1870	Incumbent re-elected.	▌ ✓ Walter L. Sessions (Republican) 57.4%; ▌ Charles D. Murray (Democratic / Liberal Republican) 42.6%
New York at-large	Samuel S. Cox; Incumbent in the 6th district.	Democratic	1868	Incumbent lost re-election. Republican gain.	▌ ✓ Lyman Tremain (Republican) 52.2%; ▌ Samuel S. Cox (Democratic / Liberal Republican) 47.8%

== North Carolina ==
District	Incumbent			This race	
District	Member	Party	First elected	Results	Candidates
North Carolina 1	Clinton L. Cobb	Republican	1868	Incumbent re-elected.	▌ ✓ Clinton L. Cobb (Republican) 52.8%; ▌ David M. Carter (Democratic-Conservative) 47.2%
North Carolina 2	Charles R. Thomas	Republican	1870	Incumbent re-elected.	▌ ✓ Charles R. Thomas (Republican) 63.3%; ▌ William H. Kitchin (Democratic-Conservative) 36.7%
North Carolina 3	Alfred Moore Waddell	Democratic-Conservative	1870	Incumbent re-elected.	▌ ✓ Alfred Moore Waddell (Democratic-Conservative) 52.7%; ▌ Neil McKay (Republican) 47.4%
North Carolina 4	Sion H. Rogers	Democratic-Conservative	1870	Incumbent lost re-election. Republican gain.	▌ ✓ William Alexander Smith (Republican) 51.4%; ▌ Sion H. Rogers (Democratic-Conservative) 48.7%
North Carolina 5	James M. Leach	Democratic-Conservative	1870	Incumbent re-elected.	▌ ✓ James M. Leach (Democratic-Conservative) 50.6%; ▌ Thomas Settle (Republican) 49.4%
North Carolina 6	None (new district)			New district. Democratic-Conservative gain.	▌ ✓ Thomas Samuel Ashe (Democratic-Conservative) 54.6%; ▌ Thomas Settle (Republican) 45.4%
North Carolina 7	Francis Edwin Shober; Redistricted from the 6th district.	Democratic-Conservative	1868	Incumbent retired. Democratic-Conservative hold.	▌ ✓ William M. Robbins (Democratic-Conservative) 54.4%; ▌ David M. Furches (Republican) 45.7%
North Carolina 8	James C. Harper; Redistricted from the 7th district.	Democratic-Conservative	1870	Incumbent retired. Democratic-Conservative hold.	▌ ✓ Robert B. Vance (Democratic-Conservative) 55.5%; ▌ William G. Candler (Republican) 44.5%

== Ohio ==
After redistricting and eleven retirements, only four of the nineteen incumbents were re-elected.

District	Incumbent			This race	
District	Member	Party	First elected	Results	Candidates
Ohio 1	Ozro J. Dodds	Democratic	1872	Incumbent retried. Democratic hold.	▌ ✓ Milton Sayler (Democratic / Liberal Republican) 58.4%; ▌ Benjamin Eggleston (Republican) 41.7%
Ohio 2	Job E. Stevenson	Republican	1868	Incumbent retired. Liberal Republican gain.	▌ ✓ Henry B. Banning (Liberal Republican / Democratic) 53.7%; ▌ Rutherford B. Hayes (Republican) 46.4%
Ohio 3	Lewis D. Campbell	Democratic	1870	Incumbent retired. Republican gain.	▌ ✓ John Quincy Smith (Republican) 52.1%; ▌ James W. Sohn (Liberal Republican / Democratic) 47.8%
Ohio 4	None (new district)			New district. Republican gain.	▌ ✓ Lewis B. Gunckel (Republican) 52.9%; ▌ James J. Winans (Liberal Republican / Democratic) 46.8%
Ohio 5	Charles N. Lamison	Democratic	1870	Incumbent re-elected.	▌ ✓ Charles N. Lamison (Democratic / Liberal Republican) 60.3%; ▌ Samuel Lybrand (Republican) 39.7%
Ohio 6	Erasmus D. Peck; Redistricted from the 10th district.	Republican	1870	Incumbent retired. Republican hold.	▌ ✓ Isaac R. Sherwood (Republican) 51.9%; ▌ Frank H. Hurd (Democratic) 47.8%
Ohio 7	John Thomas Wilson; Redistricted from the 11th district.	Republican	1866	Incumbent lost re-election. Democratic gain.	▌ ✓ Lawrence T. Neal (Democratic / Liberal Republican) 52.5%; ▌ John Thomas Wilson (Republican) 47.5%
Ohio 7	John Armstrong Smith; Redistricted from the 6th district.	Republican	1868	Incumbent retired. Republican loss.	▌ ✓ Lawrence T. Neal (Democratic / Liberal Republican) 52.5%; ▌ John Thomas Wilson (Republican) 47.5%
Ohio 8	Samuel Shellabarger; Redistricted from the 7th district.	Republican	1870	Incumbent retired. Republican hold.	▌ ✓ William Lawrence (Republican) 57.8%; ▌ J. J. Musson (Democratic / Liberal Republican) 41.9%
Ohio 8	John F. McKinney; Redistricted from the 4th district.	Democratic	1870	Incumbent retired. Democratic loss.	▌ ✓ William Lawrence (Republican) 57.8%; ▌ J. J. Musson (Democratic / Liberal Republican) 41.9%
Ohio 9	George W. Morgan; Redistricted from the 13th district.	Democratic	1868	Incumbent lost re-election. Republican gain.	▌ ✓ James Wallace Robinson (Republican) 50.4%; ▌ George W. Morgan (Democratic / Liberal Republican) 48.8%
Ohio 9	John Beatty; Redistricted from the 8th district.	Republican	1868	Incumbent retired. Republican loss.	▌ ✓ James Wallace Robinson (Republican) 50.4%; ▌ George W. Morgan (Democratic / Liberal Republican) 48.8%
Ohio 10	Charles Foster; Redistricted from the 9th district.	Republican	1870	Incumbent re-elected.	▌ ✓ Charles Foster (Republican) 51.0%; ▌ Rush R. Sloane (Liberal Republican / Democratic) 48.6%
Ohio 11	None (new district)			New district. Republican gain.	▌ ✓ Hezekiah S. Bundy (Republican) 56.2%; ▌ Samuel A. Nash (Liberal Republican / Democratic) 43.9%
Ohio 12	Philadelph Van Trump	Democratic	1866	Incumbent retired. Democratic hold.	▌ ✓ Hugh J. Jewett (Democratic / Liberal Republican) 58.5%; ▌ James Taylor (Republican) 41.0%
Ohio 13	None (new district)			New district. Democratic gain.	▌ ✓ Milton I. Southard (Democratic / Liberal Republican) 54.5%; ▌ Lucius P. Marsh (Republican) 45.6%
Ohio 14	None (new district)			New district. Democratic gain.	▌ ✓ John Berry (Democratic) 57.8%; ▌ Thomas E. Douglas (Republican) 42.0%
Ohio 15	William P. Sprague	Republican	1870	Incumbent re-elected.	▌ ✓ William P. Sprague (Republican) 51.9%; ▌ Richard R. Hudson (Liberal Republican / Democratic) 47.9%
Ohio 16	John Bingham	Republican	1864	Incumbent lost renomination. Republican hold.	▌ ✓ Lorenzo Danford (Republican) 56.3%; ▌ Christian L. Poorman (Liberal Republican / Democratic) 43.4%
Ohio 17	Jacob A. Ambler	Republican	1868	Incumbent retired. Republican hold.	▌ ✓ Laurin D. Woodworth (Republican) 54.0%; ▌ Richard Brown (Democratic / Liberal Republican) 46.0%
Ohio 18	James Monroe; Redistricted from the 14th district.	Republican	1870	Incumbent re-elected.	▌ ✓ James Monroe (Republican) 58.6%; ▌ Norton Strange Townshend (Democratic / Liberal Republican) 41.2%
Ohio 18	William H. Upson	Republican	1868	Incumbent retired. Republican loss.	▌ ✓ James Monroe (Republican) 58.6%; ▌ Norton Strange Townshend (Democratic / Liberal Republican) 41.2%
Ohio 19	James A. Garfield	Republican	1862	Incumbent re-elected.	▌ ✓ James A. Garfield (Republican) 69.4%; ▌ Milton Sutliff (Liberal Republican / Democratic) 29.9%
Ohio 20	None (new district)			New district. Republican gain.	▌ ✓ Richard C. Parsons (Republican) 55.4%; ▌ Selah Chamberlain (Liberal Republican / Democratic) 43.9%

== Oregon ==
District	Incumbent			This race	
District	Member	Party	First elected	Results	Candidates
Oregon at-large	James H. Slater	Democratic	1870	Incumbent retired. Republican gain.	▌ ✓ Joseph G. Wilson (Republican) 51.7%; ▌ John Burnett (Democratic) 48.3%

== Pennsylvania ==
District	Incumbent			This race	
District	Member	Party	First elected	Results	Candidates
Pennsylvania 1	Samuel J. Randall	Democratic	1862	Incumbent re-elected.	▌ ✓ Samuel J. Randall (Democratic / Liberal Republican) 53.4%; ▌ David F. Houston (Republican) 46.6%
Pennsylvania 2	John V. Creely	Independent Republican	1870	Incumbent disappeared. Republican gain.	▌ ✓ Charles O'Neill (Republican) 63.9%; ▌ Edward Joy Morris (Liberal Republican / Democratic) 36.1%
Pennsylvania 3	Leonard Myers	Republican	1862	Incumbent re-elected.	▌ ✓ Leonard Myers (Republican) 59.4%; ▌ Herman A. Vogelbach (Democratic / Liberal Republican) 40.6%
Pennsylvania 4	William D. Kelley	Republican	1860	Incumbent re-elected.	▌ ✓ William D. Kelley (Republican) 61.2%; ▌ Walter B. Mitchell (Democratic / Liberal Republican) 38.8%
Pennsylvania 5	Alfred C. Harmer	Republican	1870	Incumbent re-elected.	▌ ✓ Alfred C. Harmer (Republican) 55.0%; ▌ Symington Phillips (Democratic / Liberal Republican) 45.0%
Pennsylvania 6	Ephraim Acker	Democratic	1870	Incumbent lost renomination and lost re-election as an Independent Democratic candidate. Republican gain.	▌ ✓ James S. Biery (Republican) 47.8%; ▌ William H. White (Liberal Republican / Democratic) 39.2%; ▌ Ephraim Acker (Independent Democratic) 13.0%
Pennsylvania 7	Washington Townsend	Republican	1868	Incumbent re-elected.	▌ ✓ Washington Townsend (Republican) 61.4%; ▌ Franklin Taylor (Liberal Republican / Democratic) 38.6%
Pennsylvania 8	James Lawrence Getz	Democratic	1866	Incumbent retired. Democratic hold.	▌ ✓ Hiester Clymer (Democratic / Liberal Republican) 64.0%; ▌ James Millholland (Republican) 36.0%
Pennsylvania 9	Oliver James Dickey	Republican	1868	Incumbent retired. Republican hold.	▌ ✓ A. Herr Smith (Republican) 63.0%; ▌ Hugh M. North (Democratic / Liberal Republican) 37.0%
Pennsylvania 10	John W. Killinger	Republican	1870	Incumbent re-elected.	▌ ✓ John W. Killinger (Republican) 56.6%; ▌ Bernard Reilly (Democratic / Liberal Republican) 43.4%
Pennsylvania 11	John B. Storm	Democratic	1870	Incumbent re-elected.	▌ ✓ John B. Storm (Democratic / Liberal Republican) 61.4%; ▌ Abraham B. Howell (Republican) 38.6%
Pennsylvania 12	Lazarus D. Shoemaker	Republican	1870	Incumbent re-elected.	▌ ✓ Lazarus D. Shoemaker (Republican) 51.1%; ▌ Stanley Woodward (Democratic / Liberal Republican) 48.9%
Pennsylvania 13	Ulysses Mercur	Republican	1864	Incumbent resigned. Republican hold.	▌ ✓ James Dale Strawbridge (Republican) 51.7%; ▌ Bonneville Rhodes (Democratic / Liberal Republican) 48.4%
Pennsylvania 14	John B. Packer	Republican	1868	Incumbent re-elected.	▌ ✓ John B. Packer (Republican) 56.5%; ▌ Abner Rutherford (Liberal Republican / Democratic ) 43.5%
Pennsylvania 15	Richard Jacobs Haldeman	Democratic	1868	Incumbent retired. Democratic hold.	▌ ✓ John A. Magee (Democratic / Liberal Republican) 53.2%; ▌ William A. Sponsler (Republican) 46.8%
Pennsylvania 16	Benjamin F. Meyers	Democratic	1870	Incumbent lost re-election. Republican gain.	▌ ✓ John Cessna (Republican) 52.4%; ▌ Benjamin F. Meyers (Democratic / Liberal Republican) 47.6%
Pennsylvania 17	R. Milton Speer	Democratic	1870	Incumbent re-elected.	▌ ✓ R. Milton Speer (Democratic / Liberal Republican) 51.3%; ▌ Abraham Andrews Barker (Republican) 48.7%
Pennsylvania 18	Henry Sherwood	Democratic	1870	Incumbent lost re-election. Republican gain.	▌ ✓ Sobieski Ross (Republican) 53.8%; ▌ Henry Sherwood (Democratic / Liberal Republican) 46.2%
Pennsylvania 19	None (Incumbent sought re-election in the at-large district)			Incumbent sought re-election in the at-large district. Republican hold.	▌ ✓ Carlton B. Curtis (Republican) 52.2%; ▌ Thomas L. Kane (Liberal Republican / Democratic) 47.8%
Pennsylvania 20	Samuel Griffith	Democratic	1870	Incumbent lost re-election. Republican gain.	▌ ✓ Hiram L. Richmond (Republican) 52.6%; ▌ Samuel Griffith (Democratic / Liberal Republican) 47.4%
Pennsylvania 21	Henry Donnel Foster	Democratic	1870	Incumbent lost re-election. Republican gain.	▌ ✓ Alexander W. Taylor (Republican) 51.3%; ▌ Henry Donnel Foster (Democratic / Liberal Republican) 48.7%
Pennsylvania 22	James S. Negley	Republican	1868	Incumbent re-elected.	▌ ✓ James S. Negley (Republican) 61.2%; ▌ James King (Democratic / Liberal Republican) 38.8%
Pennsylvania 23	Ebenezer McJunkin	Republican	1870	Incumbent re-elected.	▌ ✓ Ebenezer McJunkin (Republican) 60.6%; ▌ William J. Kountz (Independent Democratic) 27.8%; ▌ William F. Johnson (Liberal Republican / Democratic ) 11.6%
Pennsylvania 24	William McClelland	Democratic	1870	Incumbent lost re-election. Republican gain.	▌ ✓ William S. Moore (Republican) 51.9%; ▌ William McClelland (Democratic / Liberal Republican) 48.1%
Pennsylvania at-large 3 seats on a general ticket.	Glenni W. Scofield (Incumbent in the 19th district)	Republican	1862	Incumbent re-elected to the new seat. Republican gain.	▌ ✓ Charles Albright (Republican) 17.9%; ▌ ✓ Glenni W. Scofield (Republican) 17.8%; ▌ ✓ Lemuel Todd (Republican) 17.7%; ▌ Hendrick B. Wright (Democratic / Liberal Republican) 15.6%; ▌ James Herron Hopkins (Democratic / Liberal Republican) 15.5%; ▌ Richard Vaux (Democratic / Liberal Republican) 15.4%; ▌ George F. McFarland (Prohibition) 0.05%; ▌ B. Rush Bradford (Prohibition) 0.05%; ▌ A. J. Clark (Prohibition) 0.05%
Pennsylvania at-large 3 seats on a general ticket.	None (New seat)			New seat. Republican gain.	▌ ✓ Charles Albright (Republican) 17.9%; ▌ ✓ Glenni W. Scofield (Republican) 17.8%; ▌ ✓ Lemuel Todd (Republican) 17.7%; ▌ Hendrick B. Wright (Democratic / Liberal Republican) 15.6%; ▌ James Herron Hopkins (Democratic / Liberal Republican) 15.5%; ▌ Richard Vaux (Democratic / Liberal Republican) 15.4%; ▌ George F. McFarland (Prohibition) 0.05%; ▌ B. Rush Bradford (Prohibition) 0.05%; ▌ A. J. Clark (Prohibition) 0.05%
Pennsylvania at-large 3 seats on a general ticket.	None (New seat)			New seat. Republican gain.	▌ ✓ Charles Albright (Republican) 17.9%; ▌ ✓ Glenni W. Scofield (Republican) 17.8%; ▌ ✓ Lemuel Todd (Republican) 17.7%; ▌ Hendrick B. Wright (Democratic / Liberal Republican) 15.6%; ▌ James Herron Hopkins (Democratic / Liberal Republican) 15.5%; ▌ Richard Vaux (Democratic / Liberal Republican) 15.4%; ▌ George F. McFarland (Prohibition) 0.05%; ▌ B. Rush Bradford (Prohibition) 0.05%; ▌ A. J. Clark (Prohibition) 0.05%

== Rhode Island ==
District	Incumbent			This race	
District	Member	Party	First elected	Results	Candidates
Rhode Island 1	Benjamin T. Eames	Republican	1870	Incumbent re-elected.	▌ ✓ Benjamin T. Eames (Republican) 74.0%; ▌ Thomas Davis (Liberal Republican / Democratic) 25.9%
Rhode Island 2	James M. Pendleton	Republican	1870	Incumbent re-elected.	▌ ✓ James M. Pendleton (Republican) 63.2%; ▌ George H. Browne (Democratic / Liberal Republican) 36.8%

== South Carolina ==
District	Incumbent			This race	
District	Member	Party	First elected	Results	Candidates
South Carolina 1	Joseph Rainey	Republican	1870	Incumbent re-elected.	▌ ✓ Joseph Rainey (Republican) 100.0%
South Carolina 2	Robert C. De Large	Republican	1870	Incumbent retired. Republican hold.	▌ ✓ Alonzo J. Ransier (Republican) 75.4%; ▌ William Gurney (Independent Republican) 24.6%
South Carolina 3	Robert B. Elliott	Republican	1870	Incumbent re-elected.	▌ ✓ Robert B. Elliott (Republican) 92.8%; ▌ W.H. McCaw (Democratic-Conservative) 4.9%; ▌ Samuel McGowan (Democratic-Conservative) 1.9%
South Carolina 4	Alexander S. Wallace	Republican	1868	Incumbent re-elected.	▌ ✓ Alexander S. Wallace (Republican) 53.1%; ▌Benjamin Franklin Perry (Democratic-Conservative) 46.9%
South Carolina at-large	None (new district)			New seat. Republican gain.	▌ ✓ Richard H. Cain (Republican) 71.2%; ▌ Lewis E. Johnson (Independent Republican) 27.3%

== Tennessee ==
District	Incumbent			This race	
District	Member	Party	First elected	Results	Candidates
Tennessee at-large	Horace Maynard; Redistricted from the 2nd district	Republican	1865	New district. Republican gain.	▌ ✓ Horace Maynard (Republican) 43.95%; ▌Benjamin F. Cheatham (Democratic) 35.45%; ▌Andrew Johnson (Independent) 20.61%
Tennessee 1	Roderick R. Butler	Republican	1867	Incumbent re-elected.	▌ ✓ Roderick R. Butler (Republican) 56.73%; ▌William B. Carter (Democratic) 43.27%
Tennessee 2	Abraham E. Garrett; Redistricted from the 3rd district	Democratic	1870	Incumbent lost re-election as an Independent. Republican gain.	▌ ✓ Jacob M. Thornburgh (Republican) 55.70%; ▌Alfred Caldwell (Democratic) 30.05%; ▌Abraham E. Garrett (Independent) 14.25%
Tennessee 3	None (new district)			New seat. Republican gain.	▌ ✓ William Crutchfield (Republican) 52.85%; ▌David M. Key (Democratic) 47.16%
Tennessee 4	John M. Bright	Democratic	1870	Incumbent re-elected.	▌ ✓ John M. Bright (Democratic) 69.81%; ▌John P. Steele (Republican) 30.19%
Tennessee 5	Edward I. Golladay	Democratic	1870	Incumbent lost re-election. Republican gain.	▌ ✓ Horace Harrison (Republican) 42.07%; ▌Edward I. Golladay (Democratic) 34.10%; ▌William B. Brien (Independent) 23.83%
Tennessee 6	Washington C. Whitthorne	Democratic	1870	Incumbent re-elected.	▌ ✓ Washington C. Whitthorne (Democratic) 53.89%; ▌Theodore H. Gibbs (Republican) 40.74%; ▌Jonathan Morris (Independent) 5.37%
Tennessee 7	Robert P. Caldwell	Democratic	1870	Incumbent lost renomination. Democratic hold.	▌ ✓ John D. C. Atkins (Democratic) 55.63%; ▌W. W. Murray (Republican) 37.70%; ▌W. E. Travis (Democratic) 6.67%
Tennessee 8	William W. Vaughan	Democratic	1870	Incumbent retired. Republican gain.	▌ ✓ David A. Nunn (Republican) 37.90%; ▌A. W. Campbell (Democratic) 29.83%; ▌William P. Caldwell (Democratic) 22.38%; ▌T. H. Bell (Democratic) 9.89%
Tennessee 9	None (new district)			New seat. Republican gain.	▌ ✓ Barbour Lewis (Republican) 56.67%; ▌L. C. Haines (Democratic) 43.33%

== Texas ==
District	Incumbent			This race	
District	Member	Party	First elected	Results	Candidates
Texas 1	William S. Herndon	Democratic	1871	Incumbent re-elected.	▌ ✓ William S. Herndon (Democratic) 57.1%; ▌ R. K. Smith (Republican) 37.4%; ▌ William Chambers (Republican) 5.4%
Texas 2	John C. Conner	Democratic	1869	Incumbent retired. Democratic hold.	▌ ✓ William P. McLean (Democratic) 73.9%; ▌ F. W. Minor (Republican) 26.1%
Texas 3	D. C. Giddings	Democratic	1871	Incumbent re-elected.	▌ ✓ D. C. Giddings (Democratic) 51.5%; ▌ A. J. Evans (Republican) 48.5%
Texas 4	John Hancock	Democratic	1871	Incumbent re-elected.	▌ ✓ John Hancock (Democratic) 61.7%; ▌ W. O. Hutchinson (Republican) 38.3%
Texas at-large 2 seats on a general ticket	New district			New seat. Democratic gain.	▌ ✓ Asa H. Willie (Democratic) 29.8%; ▌ ✓ Roger Q. Mills (Democratic) 29.7%; ▌ Samuel Evans (Republican) 20.3%; ▌ Anthony Banning Norton (Republican) 20.2%
Texas at-large 2 seats on a general ticket	New district			New seat. Democratic gain.	▌ ✓ Asa H. Willie (Democratic) 29.8%; ▌ ✓ Roger Q. Mills (Democratic) 29.7%; ▌ Samuel Evans (Republican) 20.3%; ▌ Anthony Banning Norton (Republican) 20.2%

== Vermont ==
District	Incumbent			This race	
District	Member	Party	First elected	Results	Candidates
Vermont 1	Charles W. Willard	Republican	1868	Incumbent re-elected.	▌ ✓ Charles W. Willard (Republican) 79.5%; ▌Homer W. Heaton (Democratic / Liberal Republican) 20.4%
Vermont 2	Luke P. Poland	Republican	1866	Incumbent re-elected	▌ ✓ Luke P. Poland (Republican) 65.5%; ▌Benjamin H. Steele (Independent Republican) 17.3%; ▌Jerome W. Pierce (Democratic / Liberal Republican) 15.1%
Vermont 3	Worthington C. Smith	Republican	1866	Incumbent retired. Republican hold.	▌ ✓ George Hendee (Republican) 77.7%; ▌ Henry Adams (Liberal Republican / Democratic) 21.7%

== Virginia ==
District	Incumbent			This race	
District	Member	Party	First elected	Results	Candidates
Virginia 1	Elliott M. Braxton; Redistricted from the 7th district.	Democratic-Conservative	1870	Incumbent lost re-election. Republican gain.	▌ ✓ James Beverley Sener (Republican) 50.9%; ▌Elliott M. Braxton (Democratic-Conservative) 49.1%
Virginia 1	John Critcher	Democratic-Conservative	1870	Incumbent retired. Democratic-Conservative loss.	▌ ✓ James Beverley Sener (Republican) 50.9%; ▌Elliott M. Braxton (Democratic-Conservative) 49.1%
Virginia 2	James H. Platt Jr.	Republican	1869	Incumbent re-elected.	▌ ✓ James H. Platt Jr. (Republican) 60.1%; ▌Baker R. Lee (Democratic-Conservative) 39.9%
Virginia 3	Charles H. Porter	Republican	1869	Incumbent retired. Republican hold.	▌ ✓ J. Ambler Smith (Republican) 51.1%; ▌George D. Wise (Democratic-Conservative) 48.9%
Virginia 4	William H. H. Stowell	Republican	1870	Incumbent re-elected.	▌ ✓ William H. H. Stowell (Republican) 65.6%; ▌Philip W. McKinney (Democratic-Conservative) 34.4%
Virginia 5	None (new district)			New district. Democratic-Conservative gain.	▌ ✓ Alexander Davis (Democratic-Conservative) 50.5%; ▌Christopher Thomas (Republican) 49.4%
Virginia 5	None (new district)			Election successfully contested. New member seated March 5, 1874. Republican gain.	▌ ✓ Christopher Thomas (Republican); ▌Alexander Davis (Democratic-Conservative)
Virginia 6	None (new district)			New district. Democratic-Conservative gain.	▌ ✓ Thomas Whitehead (Democratic-Conservative) 51.4%; ▌J. Foote Johnson (Independent) 48.6%
Virginia 7	John T. Harris; Redistricted from the 6th district.	Democratic-Conservative	1870	Incumbent re-elected.	▌ ✓ John T. Harris (Democratic-Conservative) 61.8%; ▌Charles T. O'Ferrall (Independent) 38.2%
Virginia 7	Richard T. W. Duke; Redistricted from the 5th district.	Democratic-Conservative	1870	Incumbent lost renomination. Democratic-Conservative loss.	▌ ✓ John T. Harris (Democratic-Conservative) 61.8%; ▌Charles T. O'Ferrall (Independent) 38.2%
Virginia 8	None (new district)			New district. Democratic-Conservative gain.	▌ ✓ Eppa Hunton (Democratic-Conservative) 56.2%; ▌Edward Daniels (Republican) 43.8%
Virginia 9	William Terry; Redistricted from the 8th district.	Democratic-Conservative	1870	Incumbent lost renomination. Democratic-Conservative hold.	▌ ✓ Rees Bowen (Democratic-Conservative) 66.1%; ▌Robert W. Hughes (Republican) 33.9%

== West Virginia ==
District	Incumbent			This race	
District	Member	Party	First elected	Results	Candidates
West Virginia 1	John J. Davis	Democratic	1870	Incumbent re-elected as an Independent Democrat. Independent Democratic gain.	▌ ✓ John James Davis (Ind. Democratic) 50.79%; ▌Benjamin Wilson (Democratic) 49.22%
West Virginia 2	James McGrew	Republican	1868	Incumbent retired. Republican hold.	▌ ✓ John Hagans (Republican) 82.40%; ▌Arthur R. Boeteler (Republican) 9.27%; ▌W. H. Lanon (Independent) 6.11%; ▌J. B. Walker (Independent) 1.89%; ▌O. P. Downey (Independent) 0.34%
West Virginia 3	Frank Hereford	Democratic	1870	Incumbent re-elected.	▌ ✓ Frank Hereford (Democratic) 80.80%; ▌J. B. Walker (Republican) 19.20%

== Wisconsin ==
Wisconsin elected eight members of congress on Election Day, November 5, 1872. Two seats were newly added in reapportionment after the 1870 census.

District	Incumbent			This race	
District	Member	Party	First elected	Results	Candidates
Wisconsin 1	None (new district)			New seat. Republican gain.	▌ ✓ Charles G. Williams (Republican) 62.5%; ▌Ithamar Sloan (Liberal Republican / Democratic) 37.5%
Wisconsin 2	Gerry Whiting Hazelton	Republican	1870	Incumbent re-elected.	▌ ✓ Gerry Whiting Hazelton (Republican) 53.2%; ▌George Baldwin Smith (Democratic / Liberal Republican) 46.8%
Wisconsin 3	J. Allen Barber	Republican	1870	Incumbent re-elected.	▌ ✓ J. Allen Barber (Republican) 58.2%; ▌Allen Warden (Liberal Republican / Democratic) 41.8%
Wisconsin 4	Alexander Mitchell; Redistricted from the 1st district	Democratic	1870	Incumbent re-elected.	▌ ✓ Alexander Mitchell (Democratic / Liberal Republican) 65.1%; ▌Frederick C. Winkler (Republican) 34.9%
Wisconsin 5	Charles A. Eldredge; Redistricted from the 4th district	Democratic	1862	Incumbent re-elected.	▌ ✓ Charles A. Eldredge (Democratic / Liberal Republican) 55.5%; ▌Henry Baetz (Republican) 44.5%
Wisconsin 6	Philetus Sawyer; Redistricted from the 5th district	Republican	1864	Incumbent re-elected.	▌ ✓ Philetus Sawyer (Republican) 56.1%; ▌Myron P. Lindsley (Democratic / Liberal Republican) 43.9%
Wisconsin 7	Jeremiah M. Rusk; Redistricted from the 6th district	Republican	1870	Incumbent re-elected.	▌ ✓ Jeremiah M. Rusk (Republican) 65.4%; ▌Stephen Marston (Liberal Republican / Democratic) 34.6%
Wisconsin 8	None (new district)			New seat. Republican gain.	▌ ✓ Alexander S. McDill (Republican) 59.7%; ▌William Carson (Democratic / Liberal Republican) 40.3%

== Non-voting delegates ==
Montana results by county: Maginnis: 50–60%; 60–70%; Clagett: 50–60%; No Data

District	Incumbent			This race	
District	Delegate	Party	First elected	Results	Candidates
Colorado Territory at-large	Jerome B. Chaffee	Republican	1870	Incumbent re-elected.	▌ ✓ Jerome B. Chaffee (Republican); [data missing]
Dakota Territory at-large	Moses K. Armstrong	Independent; Democratic	1870	Incumbent re-elected as a Democrat. Democratic gain.	▌ ✓ Moses K. Armstrong (Democratic) 42.81%; ▌Gideon C. Moody (Republican) 34.86%; ▌Wilmot Brookings (Republican) 22.33%
Idaho Territory at-large	Samuel A. Merritt	Democratic	1870	Incumbent lost renomination. Democratic hold.	▌ ✓ John Hailey (Democratic) 62%; ▌J. W. Houston (Republican) 38%
Montana Territory at-large	William H. Clagett	Republican	1871	Incumbent lost re-election. Democratic gain.	▌ ✓ Martin Maginnis (Democratic) 51.83%; ▌William H. Clagett (Republican) 48.17%
Wyoming Territory at-large	William T. Jones	Republican	1870	Incumbent lost re-election. Democratic gain.	▌ ✓ William R. Steele (Democratic) 51.83%; ▌William T. Jones (Republican) 46.23%

== See also ==
- 1872 United States elections
  - 1872 United States presidential election
  - 1872–73 United States Senate elections
- 42nd United States Congress
- 43rd United States Congress

== Bibliography ==
- Dubin, Michael J. (March 1, 1998). United States Congressional Elections, 1788-1997: The Official Results of the Elections of the 1st Through 105th Congresses. McFarland and Company. ISBN 978-0786402830.
- Martis, Kenneth C. (January 1, 1989). The Historical Atlas of Political Parties in the United States Congress, 1789-1989. Macmillan Publishing Company. ISBN 978-0029201701.
- Moore, John L., ed. (1994). Congressional Quarterly's Guide to U.S. Elections (Third ed.). Congressional Quarterly Inc. ISBN 978-0871879967.
- "Party Divisions of the House of Representatives 1789–Present". Office of the Historian, House of United States House of Representatives.
