= Henry Sherwood (Pennsylvania politician) =

American politician

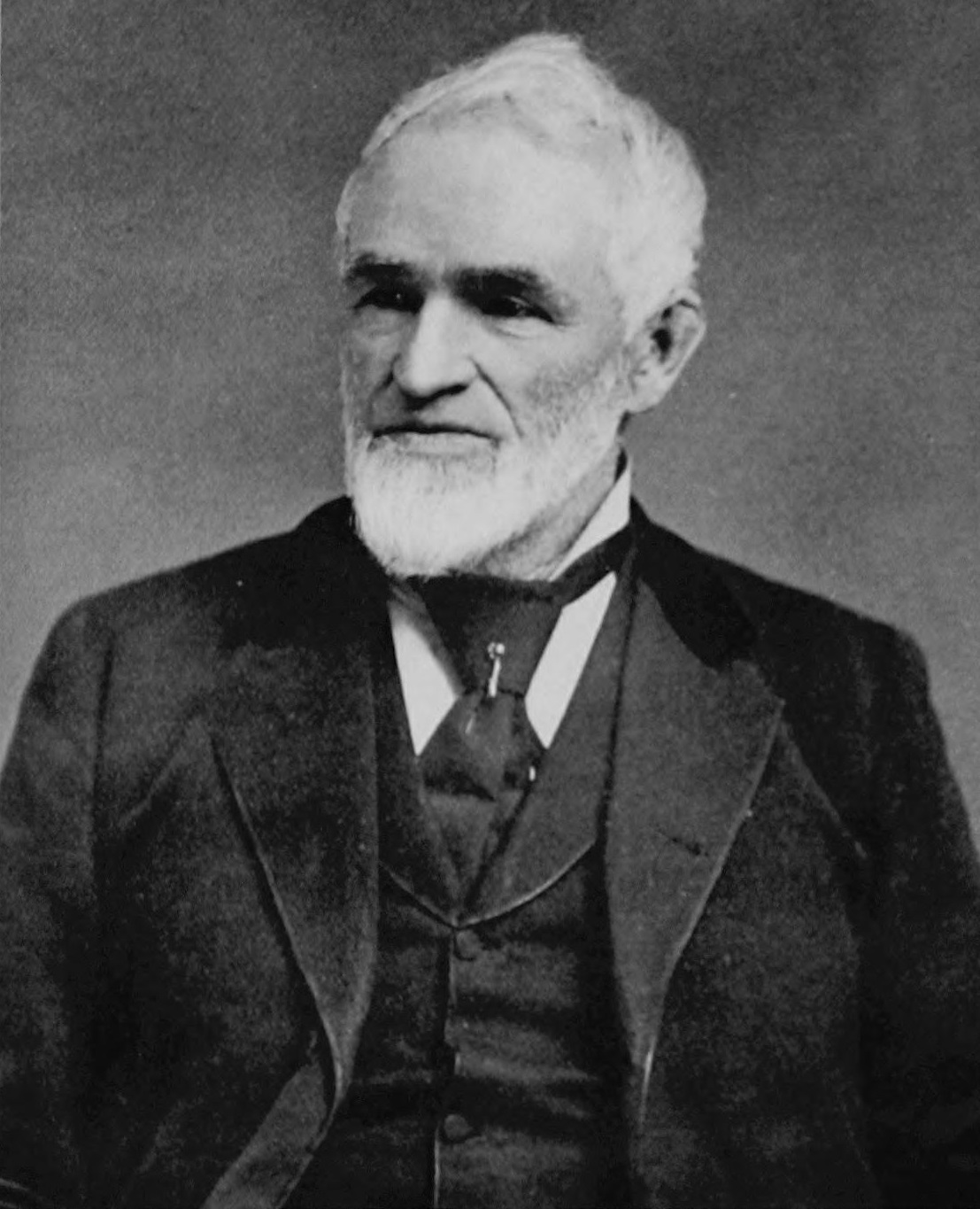
From 1897's History of Tioga County, Pennsylvania

Henry Sherwood (October 9, 1813 – November 10, 1896) was a Democratic member of the U.S. House of Representatives from Pennsylvania.

Henry Sherwood was born in Bridgeport, Connecticut. He moved with his parents to Catharine, New York, in 1817, and attended the common schools. During the Texas Revolution, Sherwood served in the Texas Army under Sam Houston in 1836 and 1837. He moved to Tioga County, Pennsylvania, and settled in Wellsboro, Pennsylvania, in 1840. He studied law, was admitted to the bar in 1847 and practiced his profession in Wellsboro. He was elected burgess of Wellsboro.

Sherwood was elected as a Democrat to the Forty-second Congress. He was an unsuccessful candidate for reelection in 1872. He was the president of the Wellsboro & Lawrenceville Railroad and of the Pennsylvania division of the Pine Creek road. He died in Wellsboro in 1896. Interment in the Wellsboro Cemetery.

== Sources ==
- United States Congress. "Henry Sherwood (id: S000354)". Biographical Directory of the United States Congress.
- The Political Graveyard

U.S. House of Representatives
Preceded by William H. Armstrong	Member of the U.S. House of Representatives from Pennsylvania's 18th congressional district 1871–1873	Succeeded by Sobieski Ross
