= Pennsylvania's 16th congressional district =

U.S. House district for Pennsylvania

Coordinates: 40°01′15″N 76°12′48″W

- Interactive map of district boundaries since January 3, 2023
- Representative: Mike Kelly; R–Butler
- Population (2025): 760,480
- Median household income: $70,820
- Ethnicity: 87.0% White; 4.4% Black; 4.1% Two or more races; 2.7% Hispanic; 1.4% Asian; 0.5% other
- Cook PVI: R+11

Pennsylvania's 16th congressional district is located in Northwestern Pennsylvania. It contains all of Erie County, Crawford County, Mercer County, Lawrence County, Butler County, and parts of Venango County. The district is represented by Republican Mike Kelly.

Prior to redistricting on March 19, 2018, the 16th congressional district was located in the southeastern part of the state, just west of Philadelphia. Previously, Northwestern Pennsylvania was represented by the third district. The Supreme Court of Pennsylvania redrew the district in February 2018 after ruling the previous map violated the state constitution due to partisan gerrymandering. What was the 16th district was modified to become the eleventh district, and the old third district likewise became the 16th, for the 2018 elections and representation thereafter.

Adams County, which includes Gettysburg, was located in the district in 1863, at the time of the Battle of Gettysburg and the Gettysburg Address. Democrat Alexander Coffroth was the district's representative at the time.

== Recent election results from statewide races ==
Year	Office	Results
2008	President	McCain 50% - 48%
2008	Attorney General	Corbett 61% - 39%
2008	Auditor General	Wagner 59% - 41%
2010	Senate	Toomey 56% - 44%
2010	Governor	Corbett 60% - 40%
2012	President	Romney 54% - 46%
2012	Senate	Smith 53% - 47%
2014	Governor	Corbett 52% - 48%
2016	President	Trump 59% - 37%
2016	Senate	Toomey 58% - 37%
2016	Attorney General	Rafferty Jr. 58% - 42%
2016	Auditor General	Brown 53% - 41%
2016	Treasurer	Voit III 51% - 42%
2018	Senate	Barletta 51% - 47%
2018	Governor	Wagner 50% - 49%
2020	President	Trump 60% - 39%
2020	Attorney General	Heidelbaugh 55% - 42%
2020	Auditor General	DeFoor 59% - 36%
2020	Treasurer	Garrity 58% - 38%
2022	Senate	Oz 55% - 42%
2022	Governor	Mastriano 50% - 48%
2024	President	Trump 61% - 38%
2024	Senate	McCormick 59% - 39%
2024	Attorney General	Sunday 61% - 36%
2024	Auditor General	DeFoor 61% - 35%
2024	Treasurer	Garrity 62% - 36%

== History ==
=== 2003–2018 ===
Created after the 2000 census, the 16th district was composed of a large portion of southern Chester County, most of Lancaster County, and a sliver of Berks County, including the city of Reading. The 16th stretched from the southwestern suburbs of Philadelphia in the east to the Susquehanna River in the west, and north to include areas around Reading.

In 2000, the 16th Congressional District was home to 646,328 residents, according to the U.S. census, and its population has increased since that year. Residents of Lancaster County made up the majority of the district's population, followed by Chester County and Berks County. The district was one of the Pennsylvania districts accused of being the result of gerrymandering. Before 2018's redistricting, PA-03 was rated a Solid Republican seat by Cook.

Pockets of urban areas exist in and around the cities of Lancaster, Reading, and West Chester.

=== 2019 ===
In February 2018, the Supreme Court of Pennsylvania ruled that the previous map was unconstitutional due to gerrymandering and released a new congressional map. The 16th district was relocated to the northwestern part of the state. The new 16th includes the cities of Erie, Sharon, Hermitage, Butler and Meadville. After redistricting, PA-16 was rated as a likely Republican seat by Cook in 2018. It is not considered a competitive district in 2020.

== Current counties and municipalities ==
Butler County (57)

All 57 municipalities

Crawford County (51)

All 51 municipalities

Erie County (38)

All 38 municipalities

Lawrence County (27)

All 27 municipalities

Mercer County (47)

All 47 municipalities

Venango County (13)

Barkeyville, Canal Township, Cooperstown, Franklin, Frenchcreek Township, Irwin Township, Jackson Township, Mineral Township, Polk, Sandycreek Township, Sugarcreek, Utica, Victory Township (part; also 15th)

== List of members representing the district ==
The district was created with two seats in 1823

=== 1823–1833: two seats ===
Cong ress	Years	Seat A			Seat B		
Cong ress	Years	Representative	Party	Electoral history	Representative	Party	Electoral history
18th	March 4, 1823 – March 3, 1825	James Allison Jr. (Beaver)	Democratic-Republican	Elected in 1822. Re-elected in 1824. Resigned before Congress convened	Walter Forward (Pittsburgh)	Democratic-Republican	Redistricted from the 14th district and re-elected in 1822. Lost re-election.
19th	March 4, 1825 – ? 1825	James Allison Jr. (Beaver)	Jacksonian	Elected in 1822. Re-elected in 1824. Resigned before Congress convened	James S. Stevenson (Pittsburgh)	Jacksonian	Elected in 1824. Re-elected in 1826. Lost re-election.
19th	? 1825 – October 11, 1825	Vacant			James S. Stevenson (Pittsburgh)	Jacksonian	Elected in 1824. Re-elected in 1826. Lost re-election.
19th	October 11, 1825 – March 3, 1827	Robert Orr Jr. (Kittaning)	Jacksonian	Elected October 11, 1825, to finish Allison's term and seated December 5, 1825. Re-elected in 1826. Retired.	James S. Stevenson (Pittsburgh)	Jacksonian	Elected in 1824. Re-elected in 1826. Lost re-election.
20th	March 4, 1827 – March 3, 1829	Robert Orr Jr. (Kittaning)	Jacksonian	Elected October 11, 1825, to finish Allison's term and seated December 5, 1825. Re-elected in 1826. Retired.	James S. Stevenson (Pittsburgh)	Jacksonian	Elected in 1824. Re-elected in 1826. Lost re-election.
21st	March 4, 1829 – November 9, 1829	John Gilmore (Butler)	Jacksonian	Elected in 1828. Re-elected in 1830. [data missing]	William Wilkins (Pittsburgh)	Anti-Masonic	Elected in 1828 but resigned November 9, 1829, before qualifying.
21st	November 9, 1829 – December 15, 1829	John Gilmore (Butler)	Jacksonian	Elected in 1828. Re-elected in 1830. [data missing]	Vacant		
21st	December 15, 1829 – March 3, 1831	John Gilmore (Butler)	Jacksonian	Elected in 1828. Re-elected in 1830. [data missing]	Harmar Denny (Pittsburgh)	Anti-Masonic	Elected November 9, 1829, to finish Wilkins's term and seated December 15, 1829. Re-elected in 1830. Redistricted to the 22nd district.
22nd	March 4, 1831 – March 3, 1833	John Gilmore (Butler)	Jacksonian	Elected in 1828. Re-elected in 1830. [data missing]	Harmar Denny (Pittsburgh)	Anti-Masonic	Elected November 9, 1829, to finish Wilkins's term and seated December 15, 1829. Re-elected in 1830. Redistricted to the 22nd district.

=== 1833-present: one seat ===
Representative	Party	Years	Cong ress	Electoral history
Joseph B. Anthony (Williamsport)	Jacksonian	March 4, 1833 – March 3, 1837	23rd 24th	Elected in 1832. Re-elected in 1834. [data missing]
Robert H. Hammond (Milton)	Democratic	March 4, 1837 – March 3, 1841	25th 26th	Elected in 1836. Re-elected in 1838. [data missing]
John Snyder (Selinsgrove)	Democratic	March 4, 1841 – March 3, 1843	27th	Elected in 1840. Lost re-election.
James Black (Newport)	Democratic	March 4, 1843 – March 3, 1847	28th 29th	Elected in 1843. Re-elected in 1844. [data missing]
Jasper E. Brady (Chambersburg)	Whig	March 4, 1847 – March 3, 1849	30th	Elected in 1846. Lost re-election.
James X. McLanahan (Chambersburg)	Democratic	March 4, 1849 – March 3, 1853	31st 32nd	Elected in 1848. Re-elected in 1850. [data missing]
William H. Kurtz (York)	Democratic	March 4, 1853 – March 3, 1855	33rd	Redistricted from the 15th district and re-elected in 1852. [data missing]
Lemuel Todd (Carlisle)	Opposition	March 4, 1855 – March 3, 1857	34th	Elected in 1854. [data missing]
John A. Ahl (Newville)	Democratic	March 4, 1857 – March 3, 1859	35th	Elected in 1856. [data missing]
Benjamin F. Junkin (New Bloomfield)	Republican	March 4, 1859 – March 3, 1861	36th	Elected in 1858. Lost re-election.
Joseph Bailey (Newport)	Democratic	March 4, 1861 – March 3, 1863	37th	Elected in 1860. Redistricted to the 15th district.
Alexander H. Coffroth (Somerset)	Democratic	March 4, 1863 – March 3, 1865	38th	Elected in 1862. [data missing]
Vacant		March 4, 1865 – February 19, 1866	39th	Contested election
Alexander H. Coffroth (Somerset)	Democratic	February 19, 1866 – July 18, 1866	39th	Lost contested election.
William H. Koontz (Somerset)	Republican	July 18, 1866 – March 3, 1869	39th 40th	Won contested election. Re-elected in 1866. [data missing]
John Cessna (Bedford)	Republican	March 4, 1869 – March 3, 1871	41st	Elected in 1868. Lost re-election.
Benjamin F. Meyers (Bedford)	Democratic	March 4, 1871 – March 3, 1873	42nd	Elected in 1870. Lost re-election.
John Cessna (Bedford)	Republican	March 4, 1873 – March 3, 1875	43rd	Elected in 1872. [data missing]
Sobieski Ross (Coudersport)	Republican	March 4, 1875 – March 3, 1877	44th	Redistricted from the 18th district and re-elected in 1874. [data missing]
John I. Mitchell (Wellsboro)	Republican	March 4, 1877 – March 3, 1881	45th 46th	Elected in 1876. Re-elected in 1878. Elected to United States Senate.
Robert J. C. Walker (Williamsport)	Republican	March 4, 1881 – March 3, 1883	47th	Elected in 1880. Declined renomination.
William W. Brown (Bradford)	Republican	March 4, 1883 – March 3, 1887	48th 49th	Elected in 1882. Re-elected in 1884. [data missing]
Henry C. McCormick (Williamsport)	Republican	March 4, 1887 – March 3, 1891	50th 51st	Elected in 1886. Re-elected in 1888. [data missing]
Albert C. Hopkins (Lock Haven)	Republican	March 4, 1891 – March 3, 1895	52nd 53rd	Elected in 1890. Re-elected in 1892. [data missing]
Fred C. Leonard (Coudersport)	Republican	March 4, 1895 – March 3, 1897	54th	Elected in 1894. [data missing]
Horace B. Packer (Wellsboro)	Republican	March 4, 1897 – March 3, 1901	55th 56th	Elected in 1896. Re-elected in 1898. [data missing]
Elias Deemer (Williamsport)	Republican	March 4, 1901 – March 3, 1903	57th	Elected in 1900. Redistricted to the 15th district.
Charles H. Dickerman (Milton)	Democratic	March 4, 1903 – March 3, 1905	58th	Elected in 1902. Declined renomination.
Edmund W. Samuel (Mount Carmel)	Republican	March 4, 1905 – March 3, 1907	59th	Elected in 1904. Lost re-election.
John G. McHenry (Benton)	Democratic	March 4, 1907 – December 27, 1912	60th 61st 62nd	Elected in 1906. Re-elected in 1908. Re-elected in 1910. Died.
Vacant		December 27, 1912 – March 3, 1913	62nd	
John V. Lesher (Sunbury)	Democratic	March 4, 1913 – March 3, 1921	63rd 64th 65th 66th	Elected in 1912. Re-elected in 1914. Re-elected in 1916. Re-elected in 1918. Lost re-election.
I. Clinton Kline (Sunbury)	Republican	March 4, 1921 – March 3, 1923	67th	Elected in 1920. Lost re-election.
Edgar R. Kiess (Williamsport)	Republican	March 4, 1923 – July 20, 1930	68th 69th 70th 71st	Redistricted from the 15th district and re-elected in 1922. Re-elected in 1924. Re-elected in 1926. Re-elected in 1928. Died.
Vacant		July 20, 1930 – November 4, 1930	71st	
Robert F. Rich (Woolrich)	Republican	November 4, 1930 – January 3, 1943	71st 72nd 73rd 74th 75th 76th 77th	Elected to finish Kiess's term. Re-elected in 1930. Re-elected in 1932. Re-elected in 1934. Re-elected in 1936. Re-elected in 1938. Re-elected in 1940. [data missing]
Thomas E. Scanlon (Pittsburgh)	Democratic	January 3, 1943 – January 3, 1945	78th	Redistricted from the 30th district and re-elected in 1942. Lost re-election.
Samuel K. McConnell Jr. (Wynnewood)	Republican	January 3, 1945 – January 3, 1953	79th 80th 81st 82nd	Redistricted from the 17th district and re-elected in 1944. Re-elected in 1946. Re-elected in 1948. Re-elected in 1950. Redistricted to the 13th district.
Walter M. Mumma (Harrisburg)	Republican	January 3, 1953 – February 25, 1961	83rd 84th 85th 86th 87th	Redistricted from the 18th district and re-elected in 1952. Re-elected in 1954. Re-elected in 1956. Re-elected in 1958. Re-elected in 1960. Died.
Vacant		February 25, 1961 – May 16, 1961	87th	
John C. Kunkel (Harrisburg)	Republican	May 16, 1961 – December 30, 1966	87th 88th 89th	Elected to finish Mumma's term. Re-elected in 1962. Re-elected in 1964. Resigned.
Vacant		December 30, 1966 – January 3, 1967	89th	
Edwin D. Eshleman (Lancaster)	Republican	January 3, 1967 – January 3, 1977	90th 91st 92nd 93rd 94th	Elected in 1966. Re-elected in 1968. Re-elected in 1970. Re-elected in 1972. Re-elected in 1974. Retired.
Robert S. Walker (East Petersburg)	Republican	January 3, 1977 – January 3, 1997	95th 96th 97th 98th 99th 100th 101st 102nd 103rd 104th	Elected in 1976. Re-elected in 1978. Re-elected in 1980. Re-elected in 1982. Re-elected in 1984. Re-elected in 1986. Re-elected in 1988. Re-elected in 1990. Re-elected in 1992. Re-elected in 1994. Retired.
Joe Pitts (Kennett Square)	Republican	January 3, 1997 – January 3, 2017	105th 106th 107th 108th 109th 110th 111th 112th 113th 114th	Elected in 1996. Re-elected in 1998. Re-elected in 2000. Re-elected in 2002. Re-elected in 2004. Re-elected in 2006. Re-elected in 2008. Re-elected in 2010. Re-elected in 2012. Re-elected in 2014. Retired.
Lloyd Smucker (Lancaster)	Republican	January 3, 2017 – January 3, 2019	115th	Elected in 2016. Redistricted to the 11th district.
Mike Kelly (Butler)	Republican	January 3, 2019 – present	116th 117th 118th 119th	Redistricted from the 3rd district and re-elected in 2018. Re-elected in 2020. Re-elected in 2022. Re-elected in 2024. Re-elected in 2026.

== Election results ==
Year	Democrat	Votes	Pct	Republican	Votes	Pct	Third Party	Votes	Pct	Fourth Party	Votes	Pct
2000	Bob Yorczyk	80,177	33.1%	Joe Pitts	162,403	67.0%						
2002				Joe Pitts	119,046	88.5%	Will Todd	8,720	6.5%	Kenneth Brenneman	6,766	5.0%
2004	Lois Herr	98,410	34.5%	Joe Pitts	183,620	64.4%	William Hagen	3,269	1.25			
2006	Lois Herr	80,915	39.6%	Joe Pitts	115,741	56.6%	John; Murphy	7,958	3.9%			
2008	Bruce Slater	120,193	39.4%	Joe Pitts	170,329	55.8%	John; Murphy	11,768	3.9%	Daniel Frank	2,877	0.9%
2010	Lois Herr	70,994	34.6%	Joe Pitts	134,113	65.4%						
2012	Aryanna Strader	109,026	39%	Joe Pitts	154,337	55%	John; Murphy	10,080	4%	Jim Bednarski	4995	2%
2014	Tom Houghton	73,921	42.2%	Joe Pitts	101,083	57.8%						
2016	Christina Hartman	134,586	42.89%	Lloyd Smucker	168,669	53.76%	Shawn Patrick House	10,518	3.35%			
2018	Ronald DiNicola	124,109	47.3%	Mike Kelly	135,348	51.6%	Ebert "Bill" Beeman	2,939	1.1%			
2020	Kristy Gnibus	143,962	40.7%	Mike Kelly	210,088	59.3%						
2022	Dan Pastore	130,443	40.6%	Mike Kelly	190,546	59.4%						
2024	Preston Nouri	146,709	36.3%	Mike Kelly	256,923	63.7%						

== Historical district boundaries ==
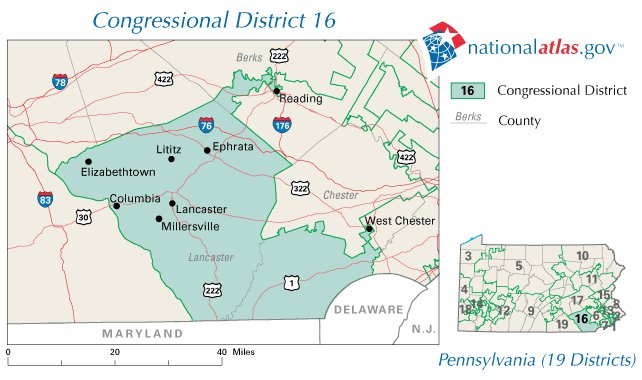
2003–2013

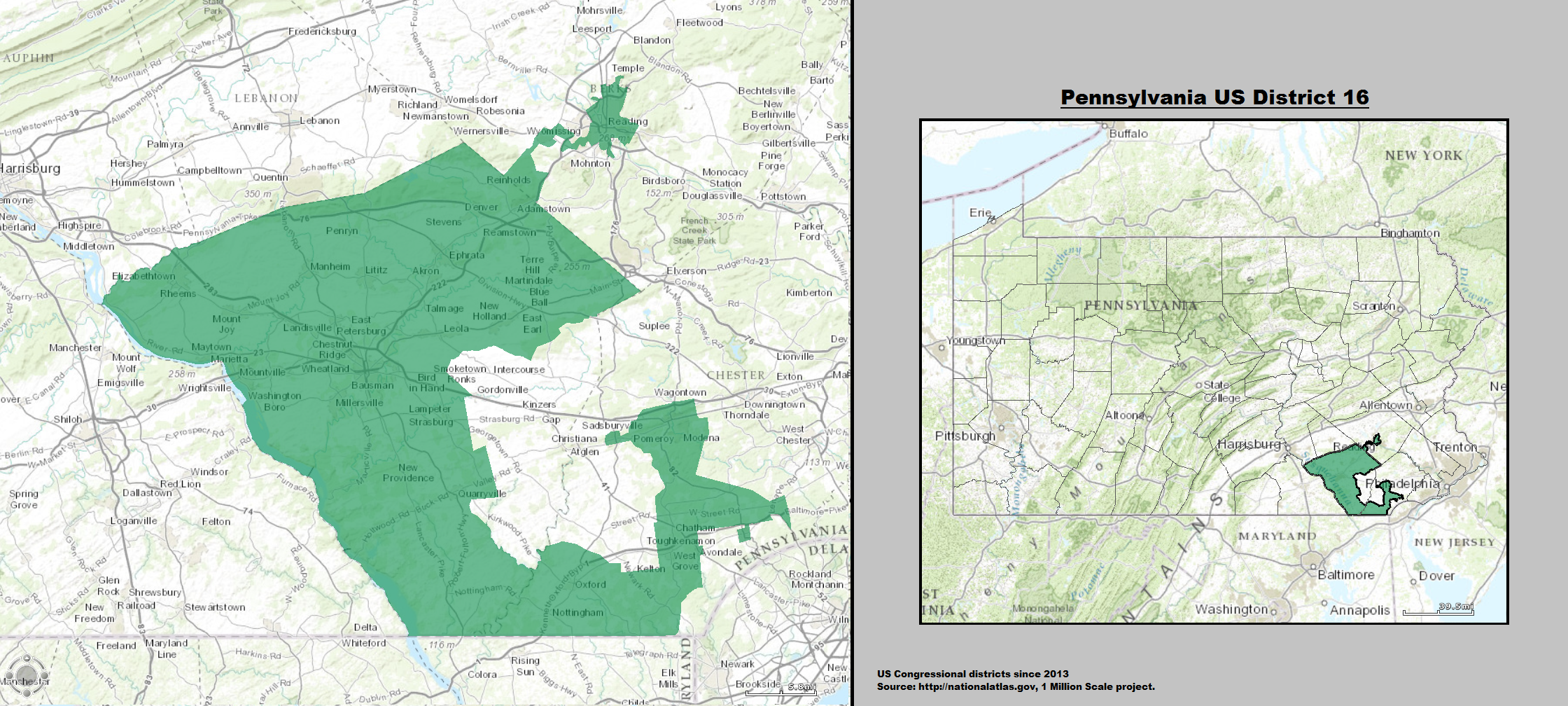
2013–2019

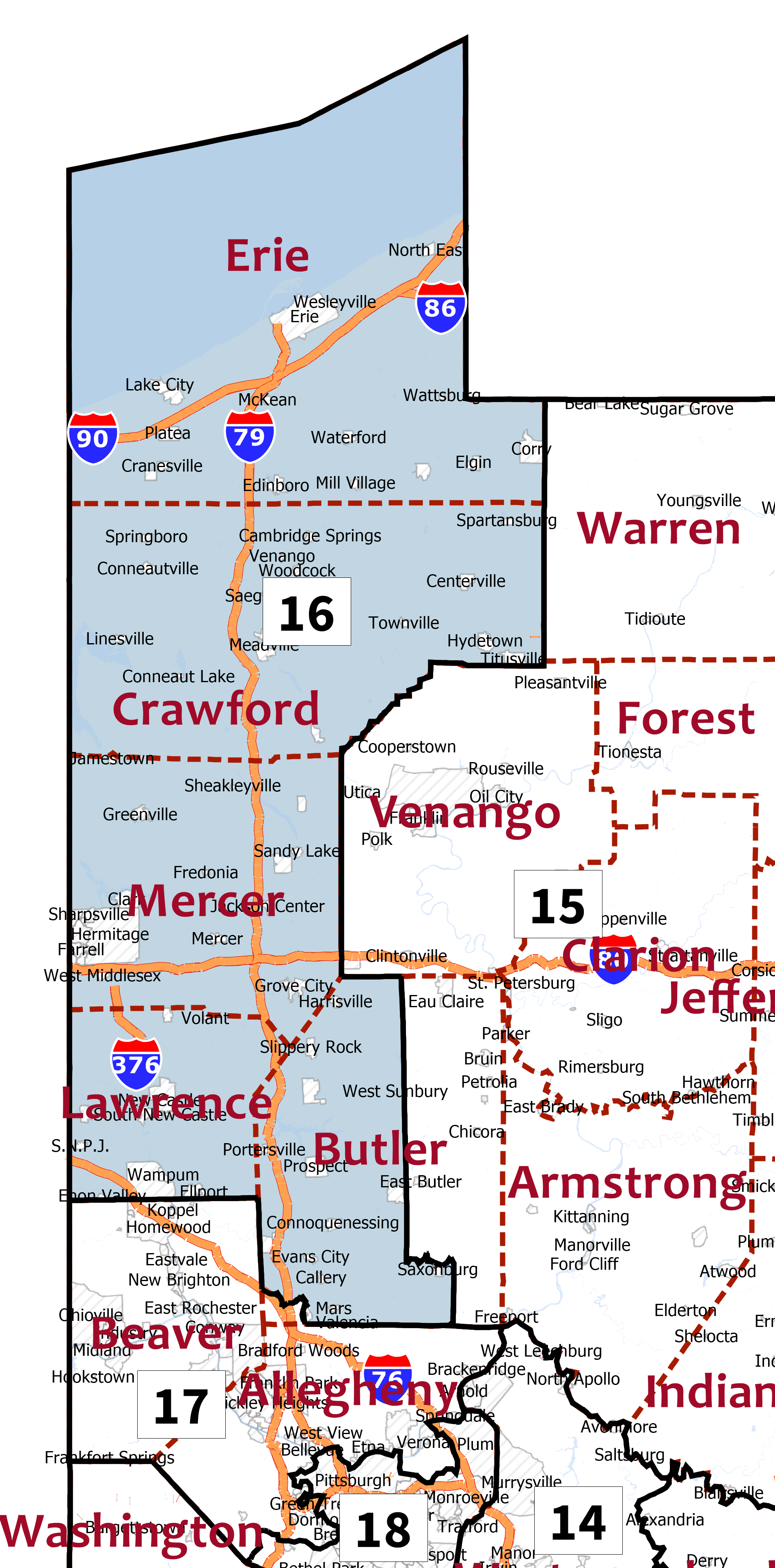
2019–2023

== See also ==
- List of United States congressional districts
- Pennsylvania's congressional districts
