= William H. Koontz =

American politician

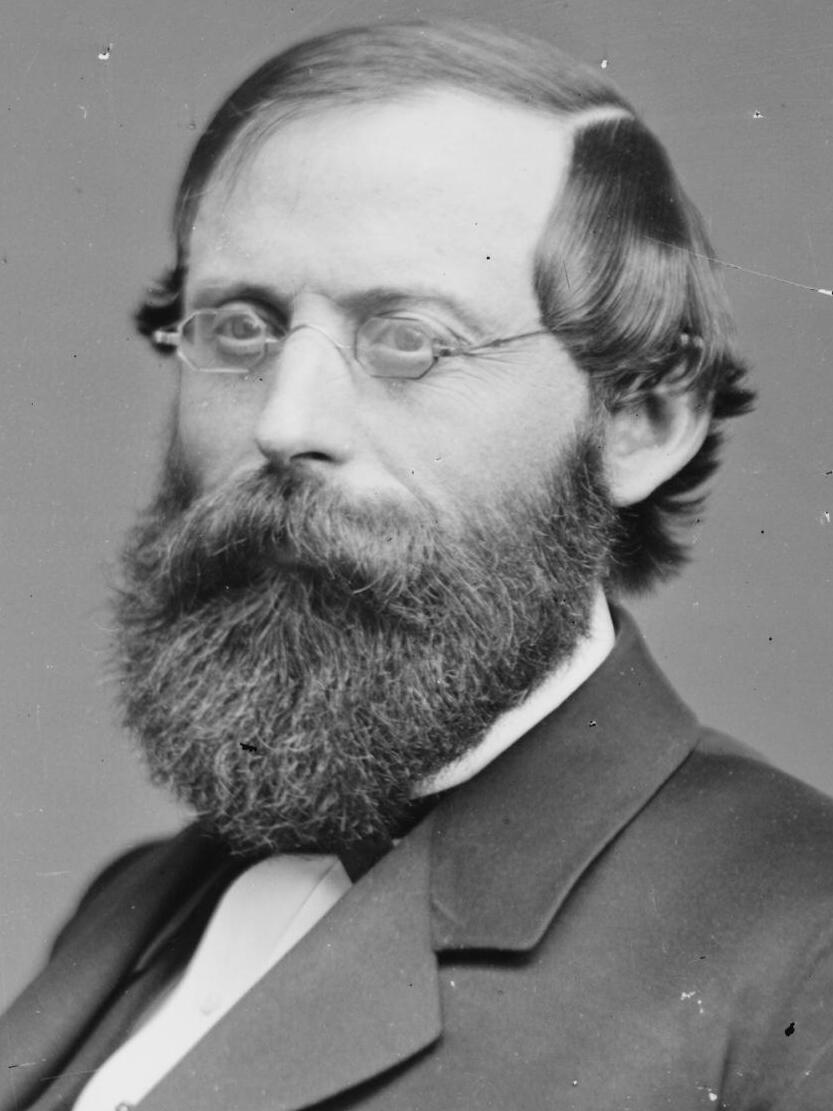

Member of the U.S. House of Representatives from Pennsylvania's 16th district
- In office July 18, 1866 – March 3, 1869
- Preceded by: Alexander H. Coffroth
- Succeeded by: John Cessna

Member of the Pennsylvania House of Representatives
- In office 1899-1902

Personal details
- Born: July 15, 1830 Somerset, Pennsylvania, U.S.
- Died: July 4, 1911 (aged 80) Somerset, Pennsylvania, U.S.
- Party: Republican

William Henry Koontz (July 15, 1830 – July 4, 1911) was a Republican member of the U.S. House of Representatives from Pennsylvania.

== Life and career ==
Koontz was born in Somerset, Pennsylvania. He completed preparatory studies, studied law, was admitted to the bar in 1851 and commenced practice in Somerset. He was district attorney for Somerset County, Pennsylvania, from 1853 to 1856. He was a delegate to the 1860 Republican National Convention. He served as prothonotary and clerk of the county court from 1861 to 1868.

He successfully contested as a Republican the election of Alexander H. Coffroth to the Thirty-ninth Congress. He was reelected to the Fortieth Congress. He was not a candidate for renomination in 1868. He resumed the practice of law at Somerset and served as counsel for the Baltimore and Ohio Railroad. He was a member of the Pennsylvania House of Representatives from 1899 to 1902. He died in Somerset in 1911 and was interment in Somerset's Union Cemetery.

U.S. House of Representatives
Preceded by Alexander H. Coffroth	Member of the U.S. House of Representatives from Pennsylvania's 16th congressional district 1866–1869	Succeeded by John Cessna
