= Benjamin F. Meyers =

American journalist

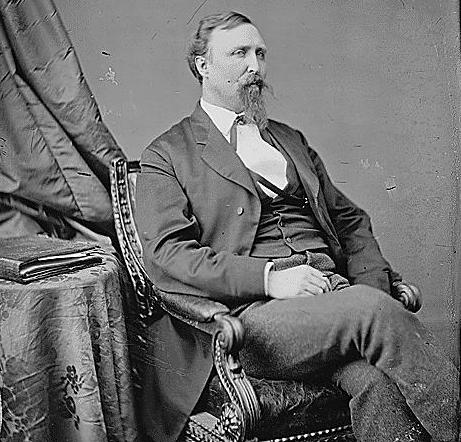
Benjamin Franklin Meyers

Benjamin Franklin Meyers (July 6, 1833 – August 11, 1918) was a Democratic member of the U.S. House of Representatives from Pennsylvania. Benjamin F. Meyers was born near New Centerville, Pennsylvania. He attended Somerset Academy and Jefferson College in Canonsburg, Pennsylvania (now Washington and Jefferson College in Washington, Pennsylvania). He studied law, was admitted to the bar and commenced practice in 1855. He served as a member of the Pennsylvania State House of Representatives in 1864. He was a delegate to the Democratic National Conventions of 1864, 1880, 1884, 1888, 1892, 1896, and 1900. He was the editor of the Bedford Gazette and in 1868 of the Harrisburg Daily Patriot.

Meyers was elected as a Democrat to the Forty-second Congress. He was an unsuccessful candidate for reelection in 1872. He served as postmaster of Harrisburg, Pennsylvania, by appointment of President Grover Cleveland from 1886 to 1891. He was publisher of the Daily Star Independent in Harrisburg. He was engaged in public utilities, and died in Harrisburg in 1918. Interment in Harrisburg Cemetery.

== Sources ==
- United States Congress. "Benjamin F. Meyers (id: M000683)". Biographical Directory of the United States Congress.
- The Political Graveyard

Party political offices
Preceded by Frank C. Osburn	Democratic nominee for Treasurer of Pennsylvania; 1895	Succeeded by M.E. Brown
U.S. House of Representatives
Preceded by John Cessna	Member of the U.S. House of Representatives from Pennsylvania's 16th congressional district 1871–1873	Succeeded by John Cessna
