= Alexander H. Coffroth =

American politician

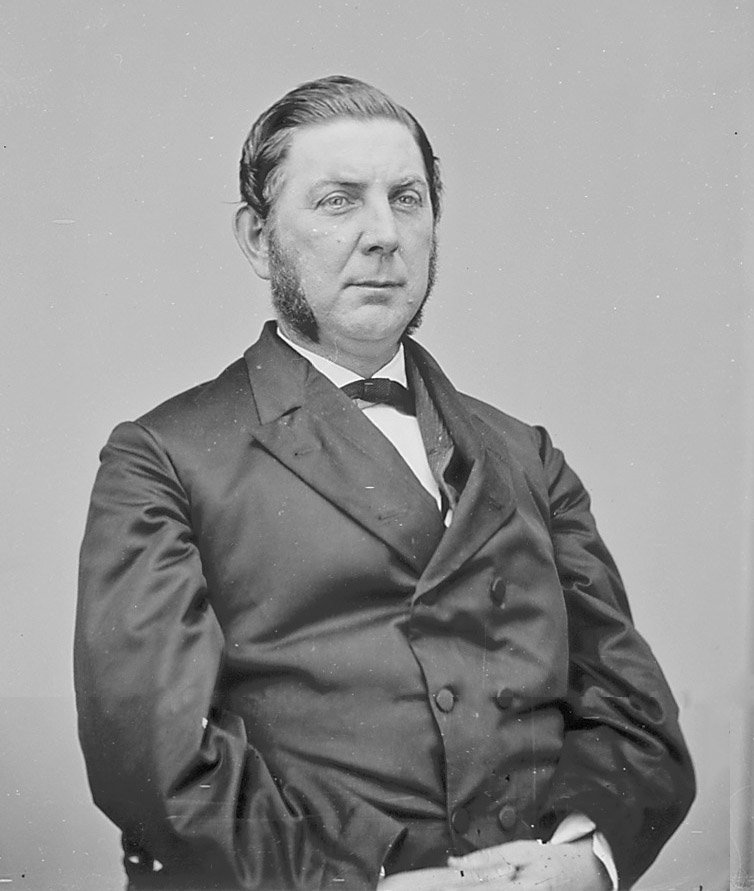

Member of the U.S. House of Representatives from Pennsylvania
- In office March 4, 1863 – July 18, 1866
- Preceded by: Joseph Bailey
- Succeeded by: William H. Koontz
- Constituency: 16th district
- In office March 4, 1879 – March 3, 1881
- Preceded by: Jacob M. Campbell
- Succeeded by: Jacob M. Campbell
- Constituency: 17th district

Personal details
- Born: Alexander Hamilton Coffroth; May 18, 1828 Somerset, Pennsylvania, U.S.
- Died: September 2, 1906 (aged 78) Markleton, Pennsylvania, U.S.
- Party: Democratic

Alexander Hamilton Coffroth (May 18, 1828 – September 2, 1906) was a Democratic member of the U.S. House of Representatives from Pennsylvania.

== Life and career ==
Alexander H. Coffroth was born in Somerset, Pennsylvania. He had at least two brothers, John B. Coffroth and C.A.B. Coffroth. He attended the public schools and Somerset Academy. For five years, he produced a Democratic newspaper in Somerset. He pursued legal education with the Hon. Jeremiah S. Black, and was admitted to the bar in February 1851 at Somerset, where he practiced his profession. He was a delegate to several Democratic State conventions, as well as a delegate to the 1860 Democratic National Conventions which assembled in Charleston, South Carolina, and Baltimore, Maryland. He served as an assessor of internal revenue in 1867, and was a delegate to the 1872 Democratic National Convention.

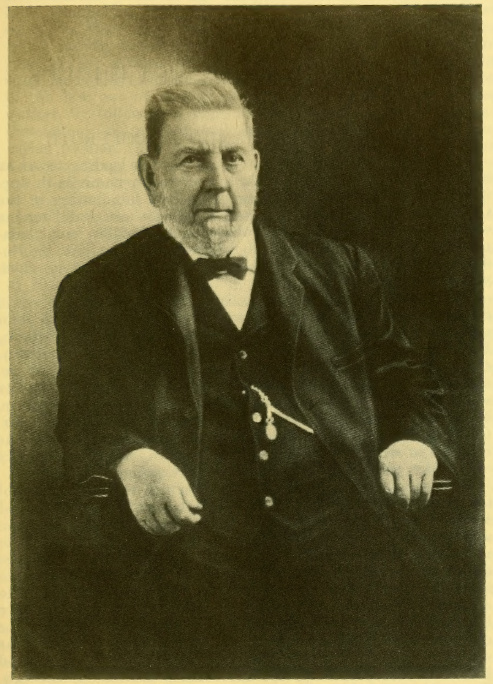
Coffroth in later years

Coffroth was elected as a Democrat to the Thirty-eighth Congress. During his term, he supported the passage of the Thirteenth Amendment, along with some other Democrats, such as Archibald McAllister. He claimed reelection to the Thirty-ninth Congress, was seated on February 19, 1866, and served until July 18, 1866, when he was succeeded by William H. Koontz, who contested the election. He was again elected to the Forty-sixth Congress. He served as chairman of the United States House Committee on Invalid Pensions during the Forty-sixth Congress. He was not a candidate for renomination in 1880, and he resumed the practice of law in Somerset. Coffroth died at the sanitarium in Markleton, Pennsylvania, on September 2, 1906. He was interred in Union Cemetery in Somerset.

Coffroth was the last surviving pallbearer who had served at the funeral of President Abraham Lincoln.

During Coffroth's tenure as its Representative, Pennsylvania's 16th district took in Adams County, which includes Gettysburg, site in 1863 of the Battle of Gettysburg and the Gettysburg Address.

== Fictional portrayals ==
In the 2012 film Lincoln, Coffroth is portrayed by Boris McGiver. A memorable two-minute scene in the film features abolitionist Thaddeus Stevens (Tommy Lee Jones) belittling Coffroth and persuading him to vote, as a Democrat, in favor of the Thirteenth Amendment, so that it would pass with bipartisan support. In the movie, Stevens offers to quash a challenge to Coffroth's election filed by his Republican challenger that would be heard by the GOP-controlled House Elections Committee, which is tasked with resolving disputed elections as tasked by the Constitution. Unlike in the movie, where Coffroth offers to switch parties in the next Congress in order to have his opponent's challenge quashed, in real life, Coffroth's Republican challenger, William H. Koontz, won his case before the House Elections Committee and Coffroth was ousted from his seat.

== Sources ==
- United States Congress. "Alexander H. Coffroth (id: C000593)". Biographical Directory of the United States Congress.
- The Political Graveyard

U.S. House of Representatives
Preceded by Joseph Bailey	Member of the U.S. House of Representatives from Pennsylvania's 16th congressional district 1863–1865	Succeeded by William H. Koontz
Preceded by Jacob M. Campbell	Member of the U.S. House of Representatives from Pennsylvania's 17th congressional district 1879–1881	Succeeded by Jacob M. Campbell
