= Sobieski Ross =

American politician

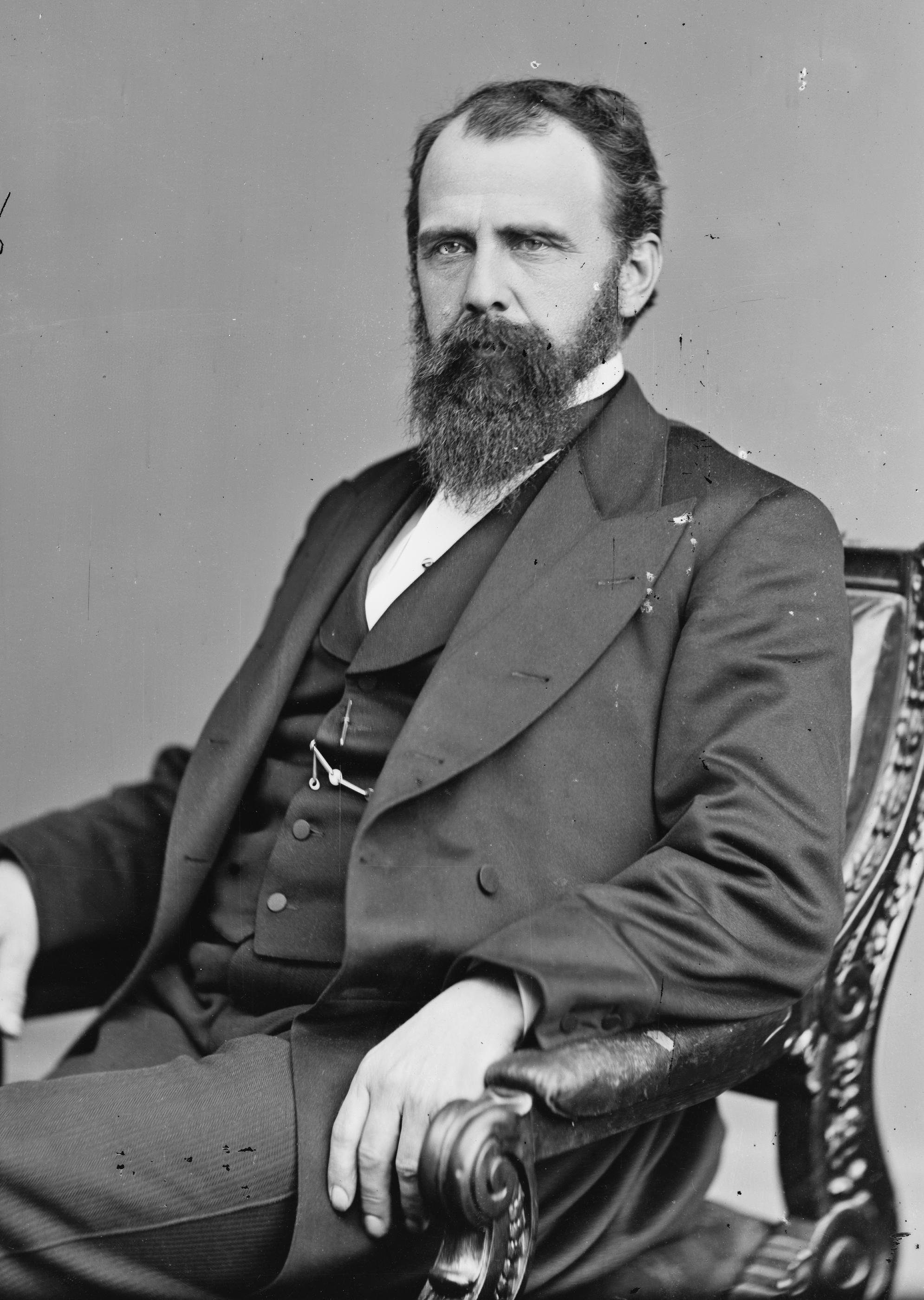
Sobieski Ross

Sobieski Ross (May 16, 1828 – October 24, 1877) was a Republican member of the U.S. House of Representatives from Pennsylvania.

Sobieski Ross was born in Coudersport, Pennsylvania. He attended the common schools and Coudersport Academy. He engaged in civil engineering and the real estate business. He was also interested in agricultural pursuits. He was appointed as an associate judge in 1852.

Ross was elected as a Republican to the Forty-third and Forty-fourth Congresses. He declined to be a candidate for renomination in 1876. He resumed the real estate business, and died in Coudersport. Interment in Eulalia Cemetery.

== Sources ==
- United States Congress. "Sobieski Ross (id: R000454)". Biographical Directory of the United States Congress.
- The Political Graveyard

U.S. House of Representatives
Preceded by Henry Sherwood	Member of the U.S. House of Representatives from Pennsylvania's 18th congressional district 1873–1875	Succeeded by William Stenger
Preceded by John Cessna	Member of the U.S. House of Representatives from Pennsylvania's 16th congressional district 1875–1877	Succeeded by John I. Mitchell
