= John Cessna =

American politician

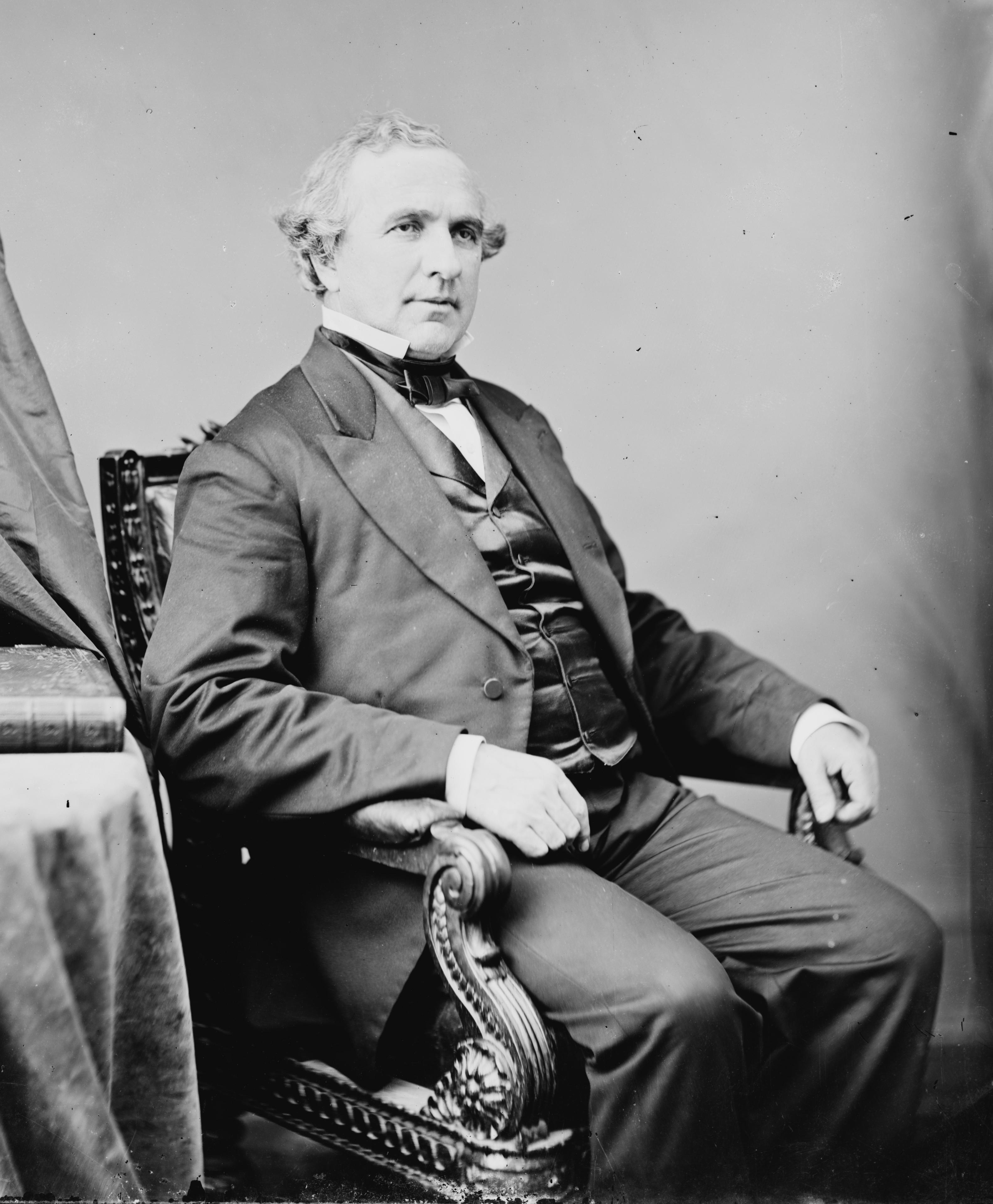

Member of the U.S. House of Representatives from Pennsylvania's 16th district
- In office March 4, 1873 – March 3, 1875
- Preceded by: Benjamin F. Meyers
- Succeeded by: Sobieski Ross
- In office March 4, 1869 – March 3, 1871
- Preceded by: William H. Koontz
- Succeeded by: Benjamin F. Meyers

Member of the Pennsylvania House of Representatives
- In office 1850; 1851; 1862; 1863

Personal details
- Born: June 29, 1821 Bedford County, Pennsylvania, U.S.
- Died: December 13, 1893 (aged 72)
- Party: Republican

John Cessna (June 29, 1821 – December 13, 1893) was a Republican member of the U.S. House of Representatives from Pennsylvania.

== Early life and education ==
Cessna was born in Bedford County, Pennsylvania. He attended the common schools and Hall's Military Academy in Bedford. Cessna graduated from Marshall College in Mercersburg, Pennsylvania, in 1842. He taught school, studied law, was admitted to the bar in 1845 and commenced practice in Bedford.

== Political activities ==
=== Democratic service ===
Cessna served as member of the Pennsylvania State House of Representatives in 1850, 1851, 1862, and 1863, and served as speaker of the house in 1850 and 1863. He was a delegate to the Democratic National Convention at Cincinnati, Ohio, in 1856 and at Charleston, South Carolina, and Baltimore, Maryland, in 1860.

=== Republican service ===
Cessna became affiliated with the Republican Party in 1863, and served as chairman of the Republican State convention in 1865. Cessna was elected chairman of the Republican State central committee in 1865. Cessna was a delegate to the Republican National Conventions in 1868, 1876, and 1880.

=== United States House of Representatives ===
Cessna was elected as a Republican to the Forty-first Congress. He was an unsuccessful candidate for reelection in 1870. Cessna was elected to the Forty-third Congress. Cessna was not a candidate for renomination in 1874. Cessna was again a member of the State House of Representatives in 1892. Cessna resumed the practice of law in Bedford where he died in 1893.

== See also ==
- Speaker of the Pennsylvania House of Representatives

== Sources ==
- United States Congress. "John Cessna (id: C000265)". Biographical Directory of the United States Congress.
- The Political Graveyard

U.S. House of Representatives
Preceded by William H. Koontz	Member of the U.S. House of Representatives from Pennsylvania's 16th congressional district 1869–1871	Succeeded by Benjamin F. Meyers
Preceded by Benjamin F. Meyers	Member of the U.S. House of Representatives from Pennsylvania's 16th congressional district 1873–1875	Succeeded by Sobieski Ross
