= 1870–71 United States House of Representatives elections =

House elections for the 42nd U.S. Congress

- June 6, 1870 – October 6, 1871 (Note: Majority of states held elections on November 8, 1870 (i.e. Election Day).)

All 243 seats in the United States House of Representatives 122 seats needed for a majority
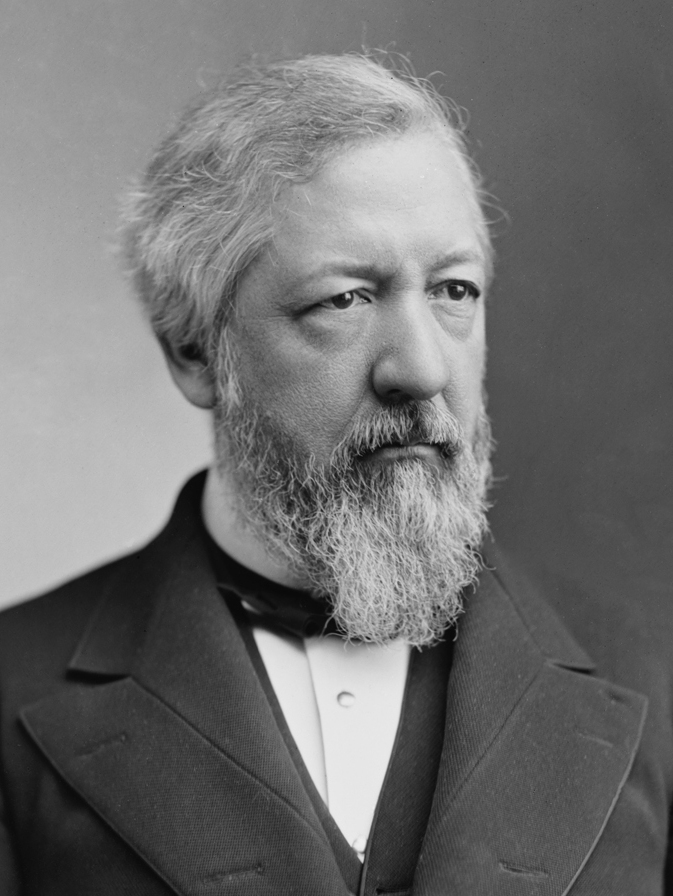

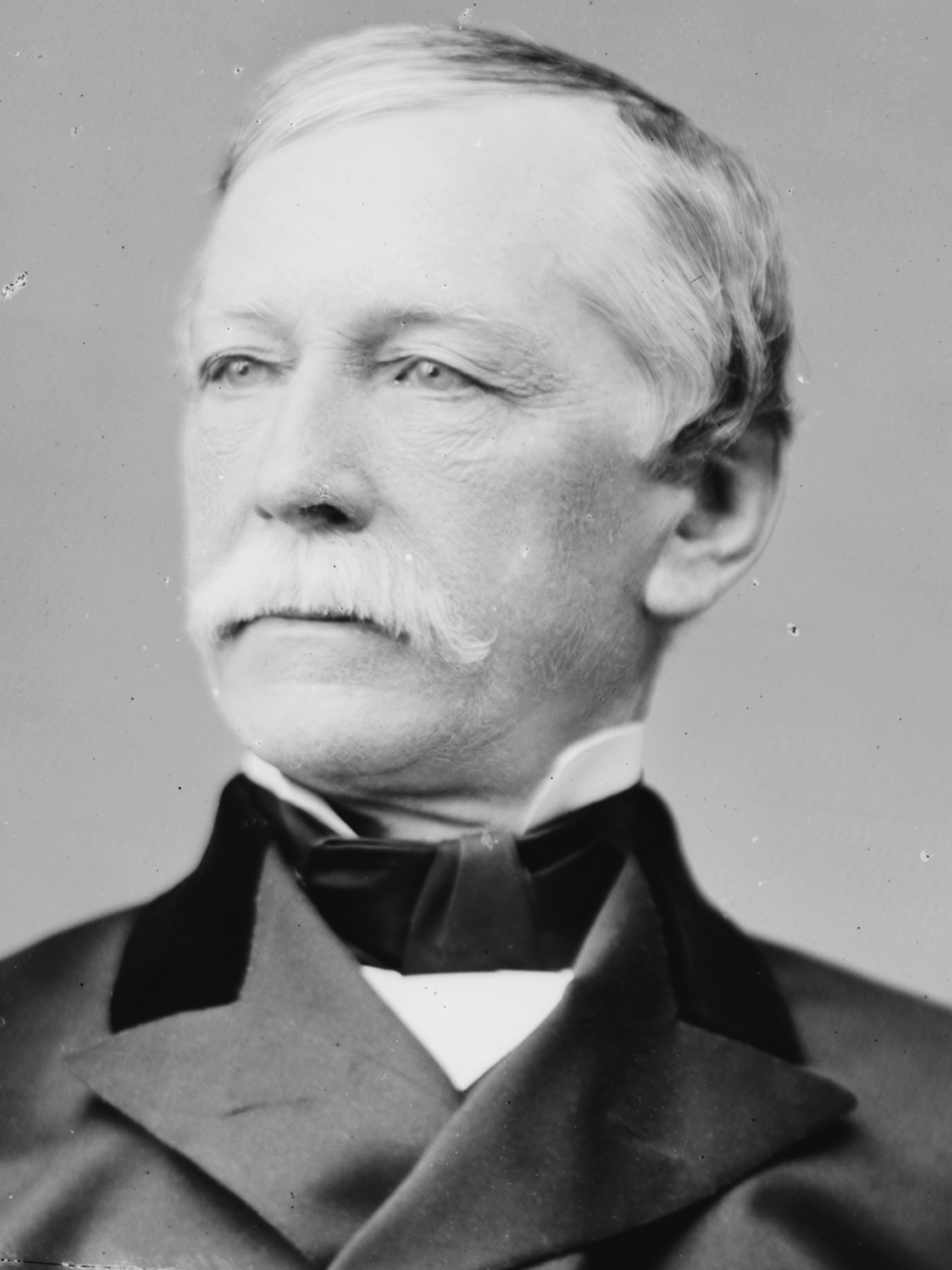
| | Majority party | Minority party |
|---|---|---|
| Leader | James G. Blaine | Fernando Wood |
| Party | Republican | Democratic |
| Leader's seat | Maine 3rd | New York 9th |
| Last election | 171 seats | 61 seats |
| Seats won | 136 | 94 (Note: Note that Dubin (p. 221) records 9–10 "Conservatives", and approximately 94 Democrats, as being elected to the 42nd Congress. This contrasts with Martis (pp. 124–125) which offers no separate accounting of "Conservatives" from Democrats and thus records a total of 104 Democratic members of the 42nd Congress.) |
| Seat change | ▼35 | ▲33 |
| Popular vote | 2,719,276 | 2,441,956 |
| Percentage | 49.59% | 44.53% |
| Swing | ▼2.22pp | ▲0.40pp |
| | Third party | Fourth party |
| Party | Conservative | Liberal Republican |
| Last election | 6 seats | New Party |
| Seats won | 10 | 2 |
| Seat change | ▲4 | ▲2 |
| Popular vote | 160,295 | 55,551 |
| Percentage | 2.92% | 1.01% |
| Swing | ▼0.27pp | Pre-creation |
| | Fifth party |
| Party | Independent |
| Last election | 0 seats |
| Seats won | 1 (Note: Includes 1 Independent Republican.) |
| Seat change | ▲1 |
| Popular vote | 98,591 |
| Percentage | 1.80% |
| Swing | ▼0.81pp |
- Results: Democratic hold Democratic gain Republican hold Republican gain Conservative gain
Speaker before election
James G. Blaine
Republican
Elected Speaker
James G. Blaine
Republican

The 1870–71 United States House of Representatives elections were held on various dates in various states between June 6, 1870, and October 6, 1871. Each state set its own date for its elections to the House of Representatives before or after the first session of the 42nd United States Congress convened on March 4, 1871. They occurred in the middle of President Ulysses S. Grant's first term. Elections were held for all 243 seats, representing 37 states.

With Grant's administration rocked by a number of scandals (including a shady deal for gold speculation that led to a crash in the market and several business deals that saw highranking governmental officials gain kickbacks) and Reconstruction winding down, his Republican Party lost seats to the opposition Democratic Party but retained an overall majority. Also, since white-supremacist governments controlled by the Democratic Party were reestablishing themselves in some portions of the Southern United States, the Democrats were able to make huge gains in this election.

== Election summaries ==
↓
| 104 | 139 |
| Democratic | Republican |

| State | Type | Total seats | Democratic | | Republican | |
| State | Type | Total seats | Seats | Change | Seats | Change |
|---|---|---|---|---|---|---|
| Mississippi (Note: Elections held early.) (Note: Elections held at the same time as elections for 41st Congress.) | District | 5 | 0 | Steady | 5 | Steady |
| Alabama | District | 6 | 3 | ▲1 | 3 | ▼1 |
| Arkansas | District | 3 | 1 | Steady | 2 | Steady |
| California (Note: Elections held late.) | District | 3 | 0 | ▼2 | 3 | ▲2 |
| Connecticut | District | 4 | 1 | Steady | 3 | Steady |
| Delaware | At-large | 1 | 1 | Steady | 0 | Steady |
| Florida | At-large | 1 | 1 | ▲1 | 0 | ▼1 |
| Georgia | District | 7 | 4 | Steady | 3 | Steady |
| Illinois | District + 1 at-large | 14 | 6 | ▲2 | 8 | ▼2 |
| Indiana | District | 11 | 5 | ▲1 | 6 | ▼1 |
| Iowa | District | 6 | 0 | Steady | 6 | Steady |
| Kansas | At-large | 1 | 0 | Steady | 1 | Steady |
| Kentucky | District | 9 | 9 | Steady | 0 | Steady |
| Louisiana | District | 5 | 0 | Steady | 5 | Steady |
| Maine | District | 5 | 0 | Steady | 5 | Steady |
| Maryland | District | 5 | 5 | Steady | 0 | Steady |
| Massachusetts | District | 10 | 0 | Steady | 10 | Steady |
| Michigan | District | 6 | 1 | ▲1 | 5 | ▼1 |
| Minnesota | District | 2 | 0 | ▼1 | 2 | ▲1 |
| Missouri | District | 9 | 4 | ▲2 | 5 (Note: Includes 2 Liberal Republicans: Gustavus A. Finkelnburg elected to Missouri's 2nd district, and James G. Blair elected to Missouri's 8th district.) | ▼2 |
| Nebraska | At-large | 1 | 0 | Steady | 1 | Steady |
| Nevada | At-large | 1 | 1 | ▲1 | 0 | ▼1 |
| New Hampshire | District | 3 | 3 | ▲3 | 0 | ▼3 |
| New Jersey | District | 5 | 2 | ▼1 | 3 | ▲1 |
| New York | District | 31 | 16 | ▲3 | 15 | ▼3 |
| North Carolina | District | 7 | 5 | ▲4 | 2 | ▼4 |
| Ohio | District | 19 | 5 | ▼1 | 14 | ▲1 |
| Oregon | At-large | 1 | 1 | Steady | 0 | Steady |
| Pennsylvania | District | 24 | 11 | ▲3 | 13 (Note: Includes 1 Independent Republican, John V. Creely, elected to Pennsylvania's 2nd district.) | ▼3 |
| Rhode Island | District | 2 | 0 | Steady | 2 | Steady |
| South Carolina | District | 4 | 0 | Steady | 4 | Steady |
| Tennessee | District | 8 | 6 | ▲6 | 2 | ▼6 |
| Texas | District | 4 | 4 | ▲3 | 0 | ▼3 |
| Vermont | District | 3 | 0 | Steady | 3 | Steady |
| Virginia | District | 8 | 5 | ▲5 (Note: Previous election had 5 Conservatives.) | 3 | Steady |
| West Virginia | District | 3 | 2 | ▲2 | 1 | ▼2 |
| Wisconsin | District | 6 | 2 | ▲1 | 4 | ▼1 |
| Total | | 243 | 104 42.8% | ▲37 | 139 (Note: Includes 2 Liberal Republicans and 1 Independent Republican.) 57.2% | ▼32 |

Results shaded according to winning candidates share of popular vote

Popular vote
| Conservative | 2.92% |
| Democratic | 44.53% |
| Independent | 1.80% |
| Lib. Republican | 1.01% |
| Republican | 49.59% |
| Others | 0.15% |

House seats
| Conservative | 4.08% |
| Democratic | 38.37% |
| Independent | 0.41% |
| Lib. Republican | 0.82% |
| Republican | 56.33% |

The previous election included 5 Conservatives

== Election dates ==
In 1845, Congress passed a law providing for a uniform nationwide date for choosing Presidential electors. This law did not affect election dates for Congress, which remained within the jurisdiction of State governments, but over time, the States moved their congressional elections to this date as well. In 1870, there remained 12 States that held elections before Election Day, and 4 that held it after at this time:

- Early elections:
  - December 1, 1869: Mississippi (Mississippi was a special case, having held elections for both the 41st Congress upon readmission and for the 42nd Congress on the same day)
  - June 6: Oregon
  - August 4: North Carolina
  - September 6: Vermont
  - September 12: Maine
  - October 11: Indiana, Iowa, Nebraska, Ohio, Pennsylvania
  - October 25: West Virginia
  - November 1: South Carolina
- Late elections:
  - March 14, 1871: New Hampshire
  - April 4, 1871: Connecticut
  - August 6, 1871: Montana Territory
  - September 6, 1871: California
  - October 6, 1871: Texas

== Special elections ==
| District | Incumbent | | | This race | |
| District | Member | Party | First elected | Results | Candidates |
|---|---|---|---|---|---|
| Iowa 2 | William Smyth | Republican | 1868 | Incumbent died September 30, 1870. New member elected December 6, 1870. Republican hold. Winner was not elected to the next term. | ▌ ✓ William P. Wolf (Republican); [data missing] |
Michigan 4
South Carolina 1
| Wisconsin 2 | Benjamin F. Hopkins | Republican | 1866 | Incumbent died January 1, 1870. New member elected February 15, 1870. Republican hold. | ▌ ✓ David Atwood (Republican) 86.0%; ▌Jared Comstock Gregory (Democratic) 5.6%; ▌George Baldwin Smith (Ind. Democratic) 1.7%; Scattering 6.7% |
| Georgia 1 | Vacant | | | Joseph W. Clift (R) had presented credentials as a Member-elect to the 41st United States Congress, but was not permitted to qualify. Republican gain. Winner was not a candidate for election to the next term. | ▌ ✓ William W. Paine (Republican); [data missing] |

== Alabama ==
| District | Incumbent | | | This race | |
| District | Member | Party | First elected | Results | Candidates |
|---|---|---|---|---|---|
| Alabama 1 | Alfred Eliab Buck | Republican | 1869 | Incumbent retired. Republican hold. | ▌ ✓ Benjamin S. Turner (Republican) 57.5%; ▌ S. J. Cumming (Democratic) 42.5% |
| Alabama 2 | Charles W. Buckley | Republican | 1868 | Incumbent re-elected. | ▌ ✓ Charles W. Buckley (Republican) 55.4%; ▌ M. B. Welbourn (Democratic) 44.6% |
| Alabama 3 | Robert Stell Heflin | Republican | 1869 | Incumbent retired. Democratic gain. | ▌ ✓ William Anderson Handley (Democratic) 57.1%; ▌ Benjamin White Norris (Republican) 43.0% |
| Alabama 4 | Charles Hays | Republican | 1869 | Incumbent re-elected. | ▌ ✓ Charles Hays (Republican) 52.6%; ▌ J. G. Harris (Democratic) 47.4% |
| Alabama 5 | Peter M. Dox | Democratic | 1869 | Incumbent re-elected. | ▌ ✓ Peter M. Dox (Democratic) 70.3%%; ▌ L. J. Sandifee (Republican) 29.7% |
| Alabama 6 | William Crawford Sherrod | Democratic | 1869 | Incumbent retired. Democratic hold. | ▌ ✓ Joseph Humphrey Sloss (Democratic) 69.4%; ▌ B. O. Masterson (Republican) 30.6% |

== Arizona Territory ==
See Non-voting delegates, below.

== Arkansas ==
| District | Incumbent | | | This race | |
| District | Member | Party | First elected | Results | Candidates |
|---|---|---|---|---|---|
| Arkansas 1 | Logan Roots | Republican | 1868 | Incumbent lost re-election. Democratic gain. | ▌ ✓ James M. Hanks (Democratic) 61.4%; ▌Logan Roots (Republican) 38.7% |
| Arkansas 2 | Anthony A. C. Rogers | Democratic | 1868 | Incumbent lost re-election. Republican gain. | ▌ ✓ Oliver P. Snyder (Republican) 59.1%; ▌Anthony A. C. Rogers (Democratic) 41.0% |
| Arkansas 3 | Thomas Boles | Republican | 1868 | Incumbent lost re-election. Liberal Republican gain. | ▌ ✓ John Edwards (Liberal Republican) 53.7%; ▌Thomas Boles (Republican) 46.3% |

== California ==
California elections
- September 6, 1871

3 seats
| | Majority party | Minority party |
|---|---|---|
| Party | Republican | Democratic |
| Last election | 1 | 2 |
| Seats won | 3 | 0 |
| Seat change | ▲2 | ▼2 |
| Popular vote | 62,539 | 57,065 |
| Percentage | 52.3% | 47.7% |
- Republican hold Republican gain

| District | Incumbent | | | This race | |
| District | Member | Party | First elected | Results | Candidates |
|---|---|---|---|---|---|
| California 1 | Samuel Beach Axtell | Democratic | 1867 | Incumbent retired. Republican gain. | ▌ ✓ Sherman O. Houghton (Republican) 51.6%; ▌Lawrence Archer (Democratic) 48.4% |
| California 2 | Aaron A. Sargent | Republican | 1868 | Incumbent re-elected. | ▌ ✓ Aaron A. Sargent (Republican) 54%; ▌James W. Coffroth (Democratic) 46% |
| California 3 | James A. Johnson | Democratic | 1867 | Incumbent retired. Republican gain. | ▌ ✓ John M. Coghlan (Republican) 51.7%; ▌George Pearce (Democratic) 48.3% |

== Colorado Territory ==
See Non-voting delegates, below.

== Connecticut ==
| District | Incumbent | | | This race | |
| District | Member | Party | First elected | Results | Candidates |
|---|---|---|---|---|---|
| Connecticut 1 | Julius L. Strong | Republican | 1869 | Incumbent re-elected. | ▌ ✓ Julius L. Strong (Republican) 50.4%; ▌Alfred R. Goodrich (Democratic) 49.4% |
| Connecticut 2 | Stephen Kellogg | Republican | 1869 | Incumbent re-elected. | ▌ ✓ Stephen Kellogg (Republican) 49.9%; ▌John Kendrick (Democratic) 49.8% |
| Connecticut 3 | Henry H. Starkweather | Republican | 1867 | Incumbent re-elected. | ▌ ✓ Henry H. Starkweather (Republican) 54.6%; ▌John W. Stedman (Democratic) 45.4% |
| Connecticut 4 | William Barnum | Democratic | 1867 | Incumbent re-elected. | ▌ ✓ William Barnum (Democratic) 52.2%; ▌George Coffing (Republican) 47.8% |

== Dakota Territory ==
See Non-voting delegates, below.

== Delaware ==
| District | Incumbent | | | This race | |
| District | Member | Party | First elected | Results | Candidates |
|---|---|---|---|---|---|
| Delaware at-large | Benjamin T. Biggs | Democratic | 1868 | Incumbent re-elected. | ▌ ✓ Benjamin T. Biggs (Democratic) 55.6%; ▌ Joshua T. Heald (Republican) 44.4% |

== District of Columbia ==
See Non-voting delegates, below.

== Florida ==
Niblack subsequently successfully challenged Walls's election and was seated from Florida's at-large district on January 29, 1873.

| District | Incumbent | | | This race | |
| District | Member | Party | First elected | Results | Candidates |
|---|---|---|---|---|---|
| Florida at-large | Charles M. Hamilton | Republican | 1868 | Incumbent lost renomination. Republican hold. | ▌ ✓ Josiah T. Walls (Republican) 51.3%; ▌Silas L. Niblack (Democratic) 48.7% |
| Florida at-large | Charles M. Hamilton | Republican | 1868 | Election successfully contested. New member seated January 29, 1873. Democratic gain. | ▌ ✓ Silas L. Niblack (Democratic) 50.3%; ▌ Josiah T. Walls (Republican) 49.7% |

== Georgia ==
Despite not being formally readmitted, members elected on April 20, 1868, were seated to fill the vacant seats for the remainder of the 40th congress. However, these members were not permitted to qualify for the 41st congress under the same election and all seats were thus vacant at the time of the 1870 election. Georgia was formally readmitted on July 15, 1870.

| District | Incumbent | | | This race | |
| District | Member | Party | First elected | Results | Candidates |
|---|---|---|---|---|---|
| Georgia 1 | Vacant | | | New member elected. Democratic gain. | ▌ ✓ Archibald T. MacIntyre (Democratic) 56.9%; ▌ Virgil Hillyer (Republican) 35.3%; ▌ Aaron Alpeoria Bradley (Ind. Republican) 7.8% |
| Georgia 2 | Vacant | | | New member elected. Democratic gain. | ▌ ✓ Nelson Tift (Democratic) 51.5%; ▌ Richard H. Whiteley (Republican) 48.5% |
| Georgia 2 | Vacant | | | Election successfully challenged. Member was not permitted to qualify and opponent was seated after votes from Calhoun and Sumter counties were omitted. New member seated December 22, 1870. Republican gain. | ▌ ✓ Richard H. Whiteley (Republican) 50.9%; ▌ Nelson Tift (Democratic) 49.1% |
| Georgia 3 | Vacant | | | New member elected. Republican gain. | ▌ ✓ John S. Bigby (Republican) 52.9%; ▌ William F. Wright (Democratic) 47.1% |
| Georgia 4 | Vacant | | | New member elected. Republican gain. | ▌ ✓ Thomas J. Speer (Republican) 51.1%; ▌ Winburn J. Lawton (Democratic) 48.9% |
| Georgia 5 | Vacant | | | New member elected. Democratic gain. | ▌ ✓ Dudley M. DuBose (Democratic) 62.3%; ▌ Isham S. Fannin (Republican) 37.7% |
| Georgia 6 | Vacant | | | New member elected. Democratic gain. | ▌ ✓ William P. Price (Democratic) 68.6%; ▌ John A. Wimpey (Republican) 25.9%; ▌ Weir Boyd (Ind. Democratic) 5.5% |
| Georgia 7 | Vacant | | | New member elected. Democratic gain. | ▌ ✓ Pierce M. B. Young (Democratic) 73.8%; ▌ George P. Burnett (Republican) 26.3% |

== Idaho Territory ==
See Non-voting delegates, below.

== Illinois ==
| District | Incumbent | | | This race | |
| District | Member | Party | First elected | Results | Candidates |
|---|---|---|---|---|---|
| Illinois 1 | Norman B. Judd | Republican | 1866 | Incumbent retired. Republican hold. | ▌ ✓ Charles B. Farwell (Republican) 57.5%; ▌ John Wentworth (Democratic) 42.4% |
| Illinois 2 | John F. Farnsworth | Republican | 1862 | Incumbent re-elected. | ▌ ✓ John F. Farnsworth (Republican) 48.6%; ▌ J. C. Stoughton (Temperence) 37.8%; ▌ Richard Bishop (Democratic) 13.6% |
| Illinois 3 | Horatio C. Burchard | Republican | 1869 | Incumbent re-elected. | ▌ ✓ Horatio C. Burchard (Republican) 65.4%; ▌ Charles Betts (Democratic) 34.6% |
| Illinois 4 | John B. Hawley | Republican | 1868 | Incumbent re-elected. | ▌ ✓ John B. Hawley (Republican) 50.1%; ▌ P. L. Cable (Democratic) 49.9% |
| Illinois 5 | Ebon C. Ingersoll | Republican | 1864 | Incumbent lost re-election. Democratic gain. | ▌ ✓ Bradford N. Stevens (Democratic) 51.7%; ▌ Ebon C. Ingersoll (Republican) 44.5%; ▌ [FNU] Ives (Temperence) 3.8% |
| Illinois 6 | Burton C. Cook | Republican | 1864 | Incumbent re-elected. | ▌ ✓ Burton C. Cook (Republican) 56.5%; ▌ Julias Avery (Democratic) 42.4% |
| Illinois 7 | Jesse H. Moore | Republican | 1868 | Incumbent re-elected. | ▌ ✓ Jesse H. Moore (Republican) 51.2%; ▌ Andrew J. Hunter (Democratic) 48.8% |
| Illinois 8 | Shelby M. Cullom | Republican | 1864 | Incumbent retired. Democratic gain. | ▌ ✓ James Carroll Robinson (Democratic ) 50.1%; ▌ Jonathan Merriam (Republican) 45.6%; ▌ [FNU] Minier (Temperence) 4.3% |
| Illinois 9 | Thompson W. McNeely | Democratic | 1868 | Incumbent re-elected. | ▌ ✓ Thompson W. McNeely (Democratic ) 55.2%; ▌ B. F. Westlake (Republican) 44.8% |
| Illinois 10 | Albert G. Burr | Democratic | 1866 | Incumbent retired. Democratic hold. | ▌ ✓ Edward Y. Rice (Democratic ) 53.7%; ▌ J. W. Kitchell (Republican) 46.3% |
| Illinois 11 | Samuel S. Marshall | Democratic | 1864 | Incumbent re-elected. | ▌ ✓ Samuel S. Marshall (Democratic) 57.7%; ▌ William H. Robinson (Republican) 42.3% |
| Illinois 12 | John B. Hay | Republican | 1868 | Incumbent re-elected. | ▌ ✓ John B. Hay (Republican) 51.8%; ▌ William Hartzell (Democratic) 48.2% |
| Illinois 13 | John M. Crebs | Democratic | 1868 | Incumbent re-elected. | ▌ ✓ John M. Crebs (Democratic) 53.0%; ▌ Daniel W. Munn (Republican) 47.0% |
| Illinois at-large | John A. Logan | Republican | 1866 | Incumbent re-elected but resigned before start of term to become U.S. Senator. | ▌ ✓ John A. Logan (Republican) 53.2%; ▌ William B. Anderson (Democratic) 45.8%; ▌ J.W. Nichols (Temperence) 1.0% |

== Indiana ==
| District | Incumbent | | | This race | |
| District | Member | Party | First elected | Results | Candidates |
|---|---|---|---|---|---|
| Indiana 1 | William E. Niblack | Democratic | 1864 | Incumbent re-elected. | ▌ ✓ William E. Niblack (Democratic) 53.4%; ▌ Henry C. Gooding (Republican) 46.6% |
| Indiana 2 | Michael C. Kerr | Democratic | 1864 | Incumbent re-elected. | ▌ ✓ Michael C. Kerr (Democratic) 60.4%; ▌ George W. Carr (Republican) 39.6% |
| Indiana 3 | William S. Holman | Democratic | 1866 | Incumbent re-elected. | ▌ ✓ William S. Holman (Democratic) 54.3%; ▌ Henry R. Pritchard (Republican) 45.7% |
| Indiana 4 | George W. Julian | Republican | 1860 | Incumbent lost renomination. Republican hold. | ▌ ✓ Jeremiah M. Wilson (Republican) 50.0%; ▌ David S. Gooding (Democratic) 50.0% |
| Indiana 5 | John Coburn | Republican | 1866 | Incumbent re-elected. | ▌ ✓ John Coburn (Republican) 50.8%; ▌ [FNU] Cottrell (Democratic) 49.3% |
| Indiana 6 | Daniel W. Voorhees | Democratic | 1868 | Incumbent re-elected. | ▌ ✓ Daniel W. Voorhees (Democratic) 52.2%; ▌ Moses F. Dunn (Republican) 47.9% |
| Indiana 7 | Godlove S. Orth | Republican | 1862 | Incumbent retired. Democratic gain. | ▌ ✓ Mahlon D. Manson (Democratic) 50.6%; ▌ Lew Wallace (Republican) 49.4% |
| Indiana 8 | James Noble Tyner | Republican | 1868 | Incumbent re-elected. | ▌ ✓ James Noble Tyner (Republican) 53.5%; ▌ J. F. Henderson (Democratic) 46.5% |
| Indiana 9 | John P. C. Shanks | Republican | 1866 | Incumbent re-elected. | ▌ ✓ John P. C. Shanks (Republican) 50.7%; ▌ Walpole G. Colerick (Democratic) 49.3% |
| Indiana 10 | William Williams | Republican | 1866 | Incumbent re-elected. | ▌ ✓ William Williams (Republican) 54.3%; ▌ M. S. Hascall (Ind. Republican/Democratic) 35.0%; ▌ [FNU] Ellison (Independent) 10.7% |
| Indiana 11 | Jasper Packard | Republican | 1868 | Incumbent re-elected. | ▌ ✓ Jasper Packard (Republican) 52.6%; ▌ S. I. Anthony (Democratic) 47.4% |

== Iowa ==
| District | Incumbent | | | This race | |
| District | Member | Party | First elected | Results | Candidates |
|---|---|---|---|---|---|
| Iowa 1 | George W. McCrary | Republican | 1868 | Incumbent re-elected. | ▌ ✓ George W. McCrary (Republican) 57.2%; ▌ Edmund Jaeger (Democratic) 42.8% |
| Iowa 2 | William Smyth | Republican | 1868 | Incumbent died. Republican hold. | ▌ ✓ Aylett R. Cotton (Republican) 59.3%; ▌ William Leffingwell (Democratic) 40.7% |
| Iowa 3 | William B. Allison | Republican | 1862 | Incumbent retired to run for U.S. Senator. Republican hold. | ▌ ✓ William G. Donnan (Republican) 59.2%; ▌ John T. Stoneman (Democratic) 40.8% |
| Iowa 4 | William Loughridge | Republican | 1866 | Incumbent lost renomination. Republican hold. | ▌ ✓ Madison Miner Walden (Republican) 56.0%; ▌ William T. Smith (Democratic) 43.9% |
| Iowa 5 | Francis W. Palmer | Republican | 1868 | Incumbent re-elected. | ▌ ✓ Francis W. Palmer (Republican) 61.2%; ▌ B. F. Montgomery (Democratic) 38.7% |
| Iowa 6 | Charles Pomeroy | Republican | 1868 | Incumbent lost renomination. Republican hold. | ▌ ✓ Jackson Orr (Republican) 73.9%; ▌ C. C. Smettzer (Democratic) 26.0% |

== Kansas ==
| District | Incumbent | | | This race | |
| District | Member | Party | First elected | Results | Candidates |
|---|---|---|---|---|---|
| Kansas at-large | Sidney Clarke | Republican | 1864 | Incumbent lost renomination. Republican hold. | ▌ ✓ David P. Lowe (Republican) 65.8%; ▌ R. C. Foster (Democratic) 34.2% |

== Kentucky ==
| District | Incumbent | | | This race | |
| District | Member | Party | First elected | Results | Candidates |
|---|---|---|---|---|---|
| Kentucky 1 | Lawrence S. Trimble | Democratic | 1865 | Incumbent lost renomination. Democratic hold. | ▌ ✓ Edward Crossland (Democratic) 64.4%; ▌ N. R. Black (Republican) 24.2%; ▌ W. C. Clark (Ind. Democratic) 11.4% |
| Kentucky 2 | William N. Sweeney | Democratic | 1868 | Incumbent declined renomination. Democratic hold. | ▌ ✓ Henry D. McHenry (Democratic) 59.9%; ▌ Milton J. Roach (Republican) 40.1% |
| Kentucky 3 | Joseph Horace Lewis | Democratic | 1870 | Incumbent re-elected. | ▌ ✓ Joseph Horace Lewis (Democratic) 56.4%; ▌ D. R. Carr (Republican) 43.6% |
| Kentucky 4 | J. Proctor Knott | Democratic | 1867 | Incumbent retired. Democratic hold. | ▌ ✓ William B. Read (Democratic) 70.9%; ▌ James M. Fidler (Republican) 29.1% |
| Kentucky 5 | Boyd Winchester | Democratic | 1868 | Incumbent re-elected. | ▌ ✓ Boyd Winchester (Democratic) 66.1%; ▌ James Speed (Republican) 33.9% |
| Kentucky 6 | Thomas L. Jones | Democratic | 1867 | Incumbent retired. Democratic hold. | ▌ ✓ William Evans Arthur (Democratic) 66.7%; ▌ Thomas Wrightson (Republican) 33.1% |
| Kentucky 7 | James B. Beck | Democratic | 1867 | Incumbent re-elected. | ▌ ✓ James B. Beck (Democratic) 56.7%; ▌ William Brown (Republican) 43.3% |
| Kentucky 8 | George Madison Adams | Democratic | 1867 | Incumbent re-elected. | ▌ ✓ George Madison Adams (Democratic) 50.0%; ▌ Hugh F. Finley (Republican) 50.0% |
| Kentucky 9 | John McConnell Rice | Democratic | 1868 | Incumbent re-elected. | ▌ ✓ John McConnell Rice (Democratic) 60.3%; ▌ George M. Thomas (Republican) 39.7% |

== Louisiana ==
| District | Incumbent | | | This race | |
| District | Member | Party | First elected | Results | Candidates |
|---|---|---|---|---|---|
| Louisiana 1 | Vacant | | | New member elected. Republican gain. | ▌ ✓ J. Hale Sypher (Republican) 62.0%; ▌ A. W. Walker (Democratic) 38.0% |
| Louisiana 2 | Lionel Allen Sheldon | Republican | 1868 | Incumbent re-elected. | ▌ ✓ Lionel Allen Sheldon (Republican) 69.6%; ▌ John A. Walsh (Democratic) 30.4% |
| Louisiana 3 | Chester Bidwell Darrall | Republican | 1868 | Incumbent re-elected. | ▌ ✓ Chester Bidwell Darrall (Republican) 60.9%; ▌ Adolph Bailey (Democratic) 39.1% |
| Louisiana 4 | Joseph P. Newsham | Republican | 1868 | Incumbent retired. Republican hold. | ▌ ✓ James McCleery (Republican) 62.2%; ▌ Michael Ryan (Democratic) 37.8% |
| Louisiana 5 | Frank Morey | Republican | 1868 | Incumbent re-elected. | ▌ ✓ Frank Morey (Republican) 58.7%; ▌ J. D. Watkins (Democratic) 41.4% |

== Maine ==
| District | Incumbent | | | This race | |
| District | Member | Party | First elected | Results | Candidates |
|---|---|---|---|---|---|
| Maine 1 | John Lynch | Republican | 1864 | Incumbent re-elected. | ▌ ✓ John Lynch (Republican) 53.2%; ▌ W. P. Haines (Democratic) 46.8% |
| Maine 2 | Samuel P. Morrill | Republican | 1868 | Incumbent lost renomination. Republican hold. | ▌ ✓ William P. Frye (Republican) 56.3%; ▌ A. Black (Democratic) 43.6% |
| Maine 3 | James G. Blaine | Republican | 1862 | Incumbent re-elected. | ▌ ✓ James G. Blaine (Republican) 55.0%; ▌ E. Wilder Farley (Democratic) 44.1% |
| Maine 4 | John A. Peters | Republican | 1866 | Incumbent re-elected. | ▌ ✓ John A. Peters (Republican) 57.6%; ▌ Marcellus Emery (Democratic) 42.3% |
| Maine 5 | Eugene Hale | Republican | 1868 | Incumbent re-elected. | ▌ ✓ Eugene Hale (Republican) 52.9%; ▌ P. J. Carleton (Democratic) 46.5% |

== Maryland ==
| District | Incumbent | | | This race | |
| District | Member | Party | First elected | Results | Candidates |
|---|---|---|---|---|---|
| Maryland 1 | Samuel Hambleton | Democratic | 1868 | Incumbent re-elected. | ▌ ✓ Samuel Hambleton (Democratic) 56.5%; ▌ Henry R. Torbert (Republican) 43.5% |
| Maryland 2 | Stevenson Archer | Democratic | 1866 | Incumbent re-elected. | ▌ ✓ Stevenson Archer (Democratic) 64.5%; ▌ William M. Marine (Republican) 35.5% |
| Maryland 3 | Thomas Swann | Democratic | 1868 | Incumbent re-elected. | ▌ ✓ Thomas Swann (Democratic) 59.2%; ▌ Washington Booth (Republican) 40.8% |
| Maryland 4 | Patrick Hamill | Democratic | 1868 | Incumbent retired. Democratic hold. | ▌ ✓ John Ritchie (Democratic) 53.4%; ▌ John E. Smith (Republican) 46.6% |
| Maryland 5 | Frederick Stone | Democratic | 1866 | Incumbent lost renomination. Democratic hold. | ▌ ✓ William M. Merrick (Democratic) 53.1%; ▌ James Albert Gary (Republican) 46.9% |

== Massachusetts ==
| District | Incumbent | | | This race | |
| District | Member | Party | First elected | Results | Candidates |
|---|---|---|---|---|---|
| Massachusetts 1 | James Buffinton | Republican | 1868 | Incumbent re-elected. | ▌ ✓ James Buffinton (Republican) 64.3%; ▌ Robert Carter Pitman (Prohibition) 20.7%; ▌ William M. Comstock (Democratic) 13.2% |
| Massachusetts 2 | Oakes Ames | Republican | 1862 | Incumbent re-elected. | ▌ ✓ Oakes Ames (Republican) 60.0%; ▌ Edward Avery (Democratic) 38.5% |
| Massachusetts 3 | Ginery Twichell | Republican | 1866 | Incumbent re-elected. | ▌ ✓ Ginery Twichell (Republican) 50.7%; ▌ William Gaiton (Democratic) 45.9% |
| Massachusetts 4 | Samuel Hooper | Republican | 1861 | Incumbent re-elected. | ▌ ✓ Samuel Hooper (Republican) 56.0%; ▌ Leopold Morse (Democratic) 39.1%; ▌ [FNU] Sargent (Labor Reform) 4.9% |
| Massachusetts 5 | Benjamin Butler | Republican | 1866 | Incumbent re-elected. | ▌ ✓ Benjamin Butler (Republican) 60.4%; ▌ William C. Endicott (Democratic) 31.1%; ▌ Jonathan H. Orne (Prohibition) 7.8% |
| Massachusetts 6 | Nathaniel P. Banks | Republican | 1865 | Incumbent re-elected. | ▌ ✓ Nathaniel P. Banks (Republican) 64.4%; ▌ John K. Tarbox (Democratic) 31.3%; ▌ [FNU] Clark (Prohibition) 4.3% |
| Massachusetts 7 | George M. Brooks | Republican | 1869 | Incumbent re-elected. | ▌ ✓ George M. Brooks (Republican) 57.6%; ▌ Seth Adams (Democratic) 31.3%; ▌ J. Chillis Kimball (Labor Reform) 10.2% |
| Massachusetts 8 | George F. Hoar | Republican | 1868 | Incumbent re-elected. | ▌ ✓ George F. Hoar (Republican) 56.2%; ▌ Alvin Cook (Democratic) 28.4%; ▌ Moses Johnson (Labor Reform) 11.5%; ▌ [FNU] Walker (Prohibition) 3.9% |
| Massachusetts 9 | William B. Washburn | Republican | 1862 | Incumbent re-elected. | ▌ ✓ William B. Washburn (Republican) 70.4%; ▌ Lysander B. Jaquith (Democratic) 27.0% |
| Massachusetts 10 | Henry L. Dawes | Republican | 1856 | Incumbent re-elected. | ▌ Henry L. Dawes (Republican) 52.9%; ▌ Reuben Noble (Democratic) 44.5%; ▌ [FNU] Bosworth (Prohibition) 2.6% |

== Michigan ==
| District | Incumbent | | | This race | |
| District | Member | Party | First elected | Results | Candidates |
|---|---|---|---|---|---|
| Michigan 1 | Fernando C. Beaman | Republican | 1860 | Incumbent retired. Republican hold. | ▌ ✓ Henry Waldron (Republican) 50.6%; ▌ Nathaniel B. Eldredge (Democratic) 48.2% |
| Michigan 2 | William L. Stoughton | Republican | 1868 | Incumbent re-elected. | ▌ ✓ William L. Stoughton (Republican) 54.6%; ▌ Henry Chamberlain (Democratic) 43.5% |
| Michigan 3 | Austin Blair | Republican | 1866 | Incumbent re-elected. | ▌ ✓ Austin Blair (Republican) 51.5%; ▌ D. D. Hughes (Democratic) 46.6% |
| Michigan 4 | Thomas W. Ferry | Republican | 1864 | Incumbent re-elected but declined the seat when elected U.S. Senator. | ▌ ✓ Thomas W. Ferry (Republican) 60.8%; ▌ Myron Rider (Democratic) 37.4% |
| Michigan 5 | Omar D. Conger | Republican | 1868 | Incumbent re-elected. | ▌ ✓ Omar D. Conger (Republican) 49.9%; ▌ Byron G. Stout (Democratic) 49.2% |
| Michigan 6 | Randolph Strickland | Republican | 1868 | Incumbent lost renomination. Democratic gain. | ▌ ✓ Jabez G. Sutherland (Democratic) 52.7%; ▌ John F. Driggs (Republican) 47.2% |

== Minnesota ==
| District | Incumbent | | | This race | |
| District | Member | Party | First elected | Results | Candidates |
|---|---|---|---|---|---|
| Minnesota 1 | Morton S. Wilkinson | Republican | 1868 | Incumbent lost renomination. Republican hold. | ▌ ✓ Mark H. Dunnell (Republican) 56.8%; ▌ Cornelius F. Buck (Democratic) 43.2% |
| Minnesota 2 | Eugene M. Wilson | Democratic | 1868 | Incumbent retired. Republican gain. | ▌ ✓ John T. Averill (Republican) 54.2%; ▌ Ignatius L. Donnelly (Democratic) 45.8% |

== Missouri ==
Missouri elected its members on November 8, 1870.

| District | Incumbent | | | This race | |
| District | Member | Party | First elected | Results | Candidates |
|---|---|---|---|---|---|
| Missouri 1 | Erastus Wells | Democratic | 1868 | Incumbent re-elected. | ▌ ✓ Erastus Wells (Democratic) 50.86%; ▌Charles R. Johnson (Liberal Republican) 36.29%; ▌Iron Z. Smith (Radical) 12.85% |
| Missouri 2 | Gustavus Finkelnburg | Radical | 1868 | Incumbent re-elected as a Liberal Republican. Liberal Republican gain. | ▌ ✓ Gustavus Finkelnburg (LR; D) 88.42%; ▌A. Van Warner (Radical) 9.46%; ▌Abraham J. Seay (Unknown) 2.13% |
| Missouri 3 | James R. McCormick | Democratic | 1867 (special) | Incumbent re-elected. | ▌ ✓ Erastus Wells (Democratic) 63.11%; ▌G. J. Van Allen (Radical) 19.43%; ▌William M. Nalle (Liberal Republican) 16.79%; ▌Isaac F. Shepard (Unknown) 0.68% |
| Missouri 4 | Sempronius H. Boyd | Radical | 1868 | Incumbent retired. Radical hold. | ▌ ✓ Harrison E. Havens (Radical) 52.99%; ▌William E. Gilmore (LR; D) 47.01% |
| Missouri 5 | Samuel S. Burdett | Radical | 1868 | Incumbent re-elected. | ▌ ✓ Samuel S. Burdett (Radical) 49.17%; ▌George R. Smith (Liberal Republican) 41.31%; ▌Douglass Dale (Democratic) 9.52% |
| Missouri 6 | Robert T. Van Horn | Radical | 1864 | Incumbent retired. Democratic gain. | ▌ ✓ Abram Comingo (Democratic) 58.81%; ▌George Smith (Radical) 41.07%; ▌Casper Grubee (Unknown) 0.12% |
| Missouri 7 | Joel F. Asper | Radical | 1868 | Incumbent retired. Radical hold. | ▌ ✓ Isaac C. Parker (Radical) 56.12%; ▌John H. Ellis (Democratic) 43.88% |
| Missouri 8 | John F. Benjamin | Radical | 1868 | Incumbent retired. Liberal Republican gain. | ▌ ✓ James G. Blair (LR; D) 56.25%; ▌J. T. Hayward (Radical) 43.75% |
| Missouri 9 | David P. Dyer | Radical | 1868 | Incumbent lost re-election as a Liberal Republican. Democratic gain. | ▌ ✓ Andrew King (Democratic) 59.65%; ▌David P. Dyer (Liberal Republican) 21.83%; ▌Edward Draper (Radical) 18.52% |

== Montana Territory ==
See Non-voting delegates, below.

== Nebraska ==
| District | Incumbent | | | This race | |
| District | Member | Party | First elected | Results | Candidates |
|---|---|---|---|---|---|
| Nebraska at-large | John Taffe | Republican | 1866 | Incumbent re-elected. | ▌ ✓ John Taffe (Republican) 60.84%; ▌George B. Lake (Democratic) 42.00% |

== Nevada ==
| District | Incumbent | | | This race | |
| District | Member | Party | First elected | Results | Candidates |
|---|---|---|---|---|---|
| Nevada at-large | Thomas Fitch | Republican | 1868 | Incumbent lost re-election. Democratic gain. | ▌ ✓ Charles West Kendall (Democratic) 52.5%; ▌ Thomas Fitch (Republican) 47.5% |

== New Hampshire ==
| District | Incumbent | | | This race | |
| District | Member | Party | First elected | Results | Candidates |
|---|---|---|---|---|---|
| New Hampshire 1 | Jacob Hart Ela | Republican | 1867 | Incumbent retired. Democratic gain. | ▌ ✓ Ellery Albee Hibbard (Democratic) 50.3%; ▌ William B. Small (Republican) 48.8%; ▌ B. Van Dame (Temperance) 0.9% |
| New Hampshire 2 | Aaron Fletcher Stevens | Republican | 1867 | Incumbent lost re-election. Democratic gain. | ▌ ✓ Samuel Newell Bell (Democratic) 51.5%; ▌ Aaron Fletcher Stevens (Republican) 47.7%; ▌ W. H. Gove (Labor Reform) 0.8% |
| New Hampshire 3 | Jacob Benton | Republican | 1867 | Incumbent retired. Democratic gain. | ▌ ✓ Hosea W. Parker (Democratic) 49.5%; ▌ Simon Goodell Griffin (Republican) 48.9% |

== New Jersey ==
| District | Incumbent | | | This race | |
| District | Member | Party | First elected | Results | Candidates |
|---|---|---|---|---|---|
| New Jersey 1 | William Moore | Republican | 1866 | Incumbent lost renomination. Republican hold. | ▌ ✓ John W. Hazelton (Republican) 53.8%; ▌ Benjamin F. Lee (Democratic) 46.2% |
| New Jersey 2 | Charles Haight | Democratic | 1866 | Incumbent retired. Democratic hold. | ▌ ✓ Samuel C. Forker (Democratic) 50.7%; ▌ William A. Newell (Republican) 49.3% |
| New Jersey 3 | John T. Bird | Democratic | 1868 | Incumbent re-elected. | ▌ ✓ John T. Bird (Democratic) 55.7%; ▌ Robert Rusling (Republican) 44.3% |
| New Jersey 4 | John Hill | Republican | 1866 | Incumbent re-elected. | ▌ ✓ John Hill (Republican) 54.1%; ▌ Philip Rafferty (Democratic) 45.9% |
| New Jersey 5 | Orestes Cleveland | Democratic | 1868 | Incumbent lost re-election. Republican gain. | ▌ ✓ George A. Halsey (Republican) 54.2%; ▌ Orestes Cleveland (Democratic) 44.0% |

== New York ==
| District | Incumbent | | | This race | |
| District | Member | Party | First elected | Results | Candidates |
|---|---|---|---|---|---|
| New York 1 | Henry Augustus Reeves | Democratic | 1868 | Incumbent retired. Democratic hold. | ▌ ✓ Dwight Townsend (Democratic) 52.4%; ▌ Caleb C. Norvell (Republican) 47.6% |
| New York 2 | John G. Schumaker | Democratic | 1868 | Incumbent retired. Democratic hold. | ▌ ✓ Thomas Kinsella (Democratic) 62.4%; ▌ Silas B. Dutcher (Republican) 37.6% |
| New York 3 | Henry Warner Slocum | Democratic | 1868 | Incumbent re-elected. | ▌ ✓ Henry Warner Slocum (Democratic) 53.8%; ▌ Erastus D. Webster (Republican) 33.6%; ▌ Robert M. Whiting (Ind. Republican) 12.7% |
| New York 4 | John Fox | Democratic | 1866 | Incumbent retired. Democratic hold. | ▌ ✓ Robert Roosevelt (Democratic) 63.0%; ▌ Martin T. McMahon (Young Democratic) 32.4%; ▌ Andrew W. Leggett (Republican) 4.6% |
| New York 5 | John Morrissey | Democratic | 1866 | Incumbent retired. Democratic hold. | ▌ ✓ William R. Roberts (Democratic) 86.0%; ▌ John A. Briggs (Republican) 13.1%; ▌ George W. Gibbons (Ind. Republican) 0.9% |
| New York 6 | Samuel S. Cox | Democratic | 1868 | Incumbent re-elected. | ▌ ✓ Samuel S. Cox (Democratic) 52.9%; ▌ Horace Greeley (Republican) 47.1% |
| New York 7 | Hervey C. Calkin | Democratic | 1868 | Incumbent retired. Democratic hold. | ▌ ✓ Smith Ely Jr. (Democratic) 73.9%; ▌ David Hunter McAlpin (Republican) 20.7%; ▌ Benjamin A. Willis (Ind. Republican) 5.5% |
| New York 8 | James Brooks | Democratic | 1866 | Incumbent re-elected. | ▌ ✓ James Brooks (Democratic) 52.6%; ▌ George Wilkes (Republican) 30.1%; ▌ Julius Wadsworth (Young Democratic) 17.4% |
| New York 9 | Fernando Wood | Democratic | 1866 | Incumbent re-elected. | ▌ ✓ Fernando Wood (Democratic) 64.8%; ▌ William S. Hillyer (Young Democratic) 19.9%; ▌ Morris Ellinger (Republican) 15.4% |
| New York 10 | Clarkson Nott Potter | Democratic | 1868 | Incumbent re-elected. | ▌ ✓ Clarkson Nott Potter (Democratic) 57.2%; ▌ James Westervelt (Republican) 42.9% |
| New York 11 | Charles Van Wyck | Republican | 1866 | Incumbent retired. Republican hold. | ▌ ✓ Charles St. John (Republican) 51.1%; ▌ William C. Sherman (Democratic) 48.9% |
| New York 12 | John H. Ketcham | Republican | 1864 | Incumbent re-elected. | ▌ ✓ John H. Ketcham (Republican) 55.1%; ▌ William H. Philip (Democratic) 44.9% |
| New York 13 | John Ashley Griswold | Democratic | 1868 | Incumbent retired. Democratic hold. | ▌ ✓ Joseph H. Tuthill (Democratic) 50.7%; ▌ James G. Lindsay (Republican) 49.3% |
| New York 14 | Stephen L. Mayham | Democratic | 1868 | Incumbent retired. Democratic hold. | ▌ ✓ Eli Perry (Democratic) 54.1%; ▌ Minard Harder (Republican) 44.9%; ▌ John Hastings (Workingman's) 1.0% |
| New York 15 | Adolphus H. Tanner | Republican | 1868 | Incumbent retired. Democratic gain. | ▌ ✓ Joseph M. Warren (Democratic) 60.4%; ▌ J. Thomas Davis (Republican) 39.6% |
| New York 16 | Orange Ferriss | Republican | 1866 | Incumbent retired. Democratic gain. | ▌ ✓ John Rogers (Democratic) 50.5%; ▌ Andrew Williams (Republican) 49.5% |
| New York 17 | William A. Wheeler | Republican | 1868 | Incumbent re-elected. | ▌ ✓ William A. Wheeler (Republican) 69.6%; ▌ George Mott (Democratic) 30.4% |
| New York 18 | Stephen Sanford | Republican | 1868 | Incumbent retired. Democratic gain. | ▌ ✓ John M. Carroll (Democratic) 48.6%; ▌ James M. Marvin (Republican) 43.9%; ▌ Samuel McKean (Ind. Republican) 7.5% |
| New York 19 | Charles Knapp | Republican | 1868 | Incumbent retired. Republican hold. | ▌ ✓ Elizur H. Prindle (Republican) 53.8%; ▌ Joseph Juliand (Democratic) 46.2% |
| New York 20 | Addison H. Laflin | Republican | 1864 | Incumbent retired. Republican hold. | ▌ ✓ Clinton L. Merriam (Republican) 53.5%; ▌ Andrew Cornwall (Democratic) 46.5% |
| New York 21 | Alexander H. Bailey | Republican | 1867 | Incumbent retired. Republican hold. | ▌ ✓ Ellis H. Roberts (Republican) 53.7%; ▌ Abram B. Weaver (Democratic) 46.3% |
| New York 22 | John C. Churchill | Republican | 1866 | Incumbent retired. Republican hold. | ▌ ✓ William E. Lansing (Republican) 56.5%; ▌ Matthew Shoecraft (Democratic) 41.4%; ▌ Caleb Calkins (Temperence) 2.1% |
| New York 23 | Dennis McCarthy | Republican | 1866 | Incumbent lost renomination and lost re-election as an Independent Republican candidate. Republican hold. | ▌ ✓ R. Holland Duell (Republican) 55.1%; ▌ Dennis McCarthy (Ind. Republican/Democratic) 44.9% |
| New York 24 | George W. Cowles | Republican | 1868 | Incumbent retired. Republican hold. | ▌ ✓ John E. Seeley (Republican) 55.7%; ▌ George B. Daniels (Democratic) 44.3% |
| New York 25 | William H. Kelsey | Republican | 1866 | Incumbent retired. Republican hold. | ▌ ✓ William H. Lamport (Republican) 56.2%; ▌ Harlow L. Comstock (Democratic) 43.5%; ▌ James C. Jackson (Independent) 0.3% |
| New York 26 | Giles W. Hotchkiss | Republican | 1868 | Incumbent lost renomination. Republican hold. | ▌ ✓ Milo Goodrich (Republican) 56.3%; ▌ Edgar K. Apgar (Democratic) 43.7% |
| New York 27 | Hamilton Ward Sr. | Republican | 1864 | Incumbent retired. Republican hold. | ▌ ✓ Horace B. Smith (Republican) 54.9%; ▌ Lucius Robinson (Democratic) 45.1% |
| New York 28 | Noah Davis | Republican | 1868 | Incumbent resigned. Republican hold. | ▌ ✓ Freeman Clarke (Republican) 55.3%; ▌ John H. White (Democratic) 44.7% |
| New York 29 | John Fisher | Republican | 1868 | Incumbent lost renomination. Republican hold. | ▌ ✓ Seth Wakeman (Republican) 57.3%; ▌ Alex G. Shepard (Democratic) 42.7% |
| New York 30 | David S. Bennett | Republican | 1868 | Incumbent retired. Democratic gain. | ▌ ✓ William Williams (Democratic) 51.0%; ▌ Lyman K. Bass (Republican) 49.0% |
| New York 31 | Porter Sheldon | Republican | 1868 | Incumbent lost renomination. Republican hold. | ▌ ✓ Walter L. Sessions (Republican) 50.9%; ▌ Charles D. Murray (Democratic) 49.1% |

== North Carolina ==
| District | Incumbent | | | This race | |
| District | Member | Party | First elected | Results | Candidates |
|---|---|---|---|---|---|
| North Carolina 1 | Clinton L. Cobb | Republican | 1868 | Incumbent re-elected. | ▌ ✓ Clinton L. Cobb (Republican) 60.7%; ▌ Timothy Morgan (Ind. Republican ) 39.3% |
| North Carolina 2 | David Heaton | Republican | 1868 | Incumbent died. Republican hold. | ▌ ✓ Charles R. Thomas (Republican) 55.0%; ▌ Lott W. Humphrey (Democratic-Conservative) 45.0% |
| North Carolina 3 | Oliver H. Dockery | Republican | 1868 | Incumbent lost re-election. Democratic-Conservative gain. | ▌ ✓ Alfred Moore Waddell (Democratic-Conservative) 50.6%; ▌ Oliver H. Dockery (Republican) 49.4% |
| North Carolina 4 | John T. Deweese | Republican | 1868 | Incumbent resigned. Democratic-Conservative gain. | ▌ ✓ Sion H. Rogers (Democratic-Conservative) 51.7%; ▌ James Harris (Republican) 48.3% |
| North Carolina 5 | Israel G. Lash | Republican | 1868 | Incumbent retired. Democratic-Conservative gain. | ▌ ✓ James M. Leach (Democratic-Conservative) 52.6%; ▌ William L. Scott (Republican) 47.4% |
| North Carolina 6 | Francis Edwin Shober | Democratic-Conservative | 1868 | Incumbent re-elected. | ▌ ✓ Francis Edwin Shober (Democratic-Conservative) 60.0%; ▌ Frederick H. Sprague (Republican) 40.0% |
| North Carolina 7 | Alexander H. Jones | Republican | 1868 | Incumbent lost re-election. Democratic-Conservative gain. | ▌ ✓ James C. Harper (Democratic-Conservative) 56.7%; ▌ Alexander H. Jones (Republican) 43.3% |

== New Mexico Territory ==
See Non-voting delegates, below.

== Ohio ==
| District | Incumbent | | | This race | |
| District | Member | Party | First elected | Results | Candidates |
|---|---|---|---|---|---|
| Ohio 1 | Peter W. Strader | Democratic | 1868 | Incumbent retired. Republican gain. | ▌ ✓ Aaron F. Perry (Republican) 52.4%; ▌Milton Sayler (Democratic) 47.6% |
| Ohio 2 | Job E. Stevenson | Republican | 1868 | Incumbent re-elected. | ▌ ✓ Job E. Stevenson (Republican) 54.5%; ▌Samuel F. Cary (Democratic) 45.5% |
| Ohio 3 | Robert C. Schenck | Republican | 1862 | Incumbent lost re-election. Democratic gain. | ▌ ✓ Lewis D. Campbell (Democratic) 50.1%; ▌Robert C. Schenck (Republican) 49.9% |
| Ohio 4 | William Lawrence | Republican | 1864 | Incumbent retired. Democratic gain. | ▌ ✓ John F. McKinney (Democratic) 50.5%; ▌William B. McClung (Republican) 49.5% |
| Ohio 5 | William Mungen | Democratic | 1866 | Incumbent retired. Democratic hold. | ▌ ✓ Charles N. Lamison (Democratic) 57.4%; ▌John B. Clark (Republican) 42.6% |
| Ohio 6 | John Armstrong Smith | Republican | 1868 | Incumbent re-elected. | ▌ ✓ John Armstrong Smith (Republican) 50.8%; ▌James W. Denver (Democratic) 49.2% |
| Ohio 7 | James J. Winans | Republican | 1868 | Incumbent lost renomination. Republican hold. | ▌ ✓ Samuel Shellabarger (Republican) 52.8%; ▌Hugh J. Jewett (Democratic) 47.2% |
| Ohio 8 | John Beatty | Republican | 1868 (Special) | Incumbent re-elected. | ▌ ✓ John Beatty (Republican) 52.9%; ▌James Randolph Hubbell (Democratic) 47.1% |
| Ohio 9 | Edward F. Dickinson | Democratic | 1868 | Incumbent lost re-election. Republican gain. | ▌ ✓ Charles Foster (Republican) 51.5%; ▌Edward F. Dickinson (Democratic) 48.5% |
| Ohio 10 | Erasmus D. Peck | Republican | 1870 (Special) | Incumbent re-elected. | ▌ ✓ Erasmus D. Peck (Republican) 52.5%; ▌William F. Lockwood (Democratic) 47.5% |
| Ohio 11 | John Thomas Wilson | Republican | 1866 | Incumbent re-elected. | ▌ ✓ John Thomas Wilson (Republican) 52.4%; ▌Ralph Leete (Democratic) 47.6% |
| Ohio 12 | Philadelph Van Trump | Democratic | 1866 | Incumbent re-elected. | ▌ ✓ Philadelph Van Trump (Democratic) 57.9%; ▌Charles Elwood Brown (Republican) 42.1% |
| Ohio 13 | George W. Morgan | Democratic | 1868 | Incumbent re-elected. | ▌ ✓ George W. Morgan (Democratic) 54.1%; ▌Charles W. Potwin (Republican) 45.9% |
| Ohio 14 | Martin Welker | Republican | 1864 | Incumbent retired. Republican hold. | ▌ ✓ James Monroe (Republican) 51.5%; ▌Lyman R. Critchfield (Democratic) 48.5% |
| Ohio 15 | Eliakim H. Moore | Republican | 1868 | Incumbent retired. Republican hold. | ▌ ✓ William P. Sprague (Republican) 51.6%; ▌John Cartwright (Democratic) 48.4% |
| Ohio 16 | John Bingham | Republican | 1864 | Incumbent re-elected. | ▌ ✓ John Bingham (Republican) 52.4%; ▌Robert A. Chambers (Democratic) 47.6% |
| Ohio 17 | Jacob A. Ambler | Republican | 1868 | Incumbent re-elected. | ▌ ✓ Jacob A. Ambler (Republican) 55.1%; ▌John Ball (Republican) 44.9% |
| Ohio 18 | William H. Upson | Republican | 1868 | Incumbent re-elected. | ▌ ✓ William H. Upson (Republican) 62.2%; ▌John M. Coffinberry (Democratic) 37.8% |
| Ohio 19 | James A. Garfield | Republican | 1862 | Incumbent re-elected. | ▌ ✓ James A. Garfield (Republican) 65.1%; ▌William Howard (Democratic) 34.9% |

== Oregon ==
| District | Incumbent | | | This race | |
| District | Member | Party | First elected | Results | Candidates |
|---|---|---|---|---|---|
| Oregon at-large | Joseph Showalter Smith | Democratic | 1868 | Incumbent retired. Democratic hold. | ▌ ✓ James H. Slater (Democratic) 50.8%; ▌ Joseph G. Wilson (Republican) 49.3% |

== Pennsylvania ==
| District | Incumbent | | | This race | |
| District | Member | Party | First elected | Results | Candidates |
|---|---|---|---|---|---|
| Pennsylvania 1 | Samuel J. Randall | Democratic | 1862 | Incumbent re-elected. | ▌ ✓ Samuel J. Randall (Democratic) 61.8%; ▌ Benjamin Huckell (Republican) 38.2% |
| Pennsylvania 2 | Charles O'Neill | Republican | 1862 | Incumbent lost re-election. Independent Republican gain. | ▌ ✓ Edward Joy Morris (Ind. Republican / Democratic) 52.2%; ▌ Charles O'Neill (Republican) 47.8% |
| Pennsylvania 3 | Leonard Myers | Republican | 1862 | Incumbent re-elected. | ▌ ✓ Leonard Myers (Republican) 53.6%; ▌ John Moffet (Democratic) 46.4% |
| Pennsylvania 4 | William D. Kelley | Republican | 1860 | Incumbent re-elected. | ▌ ✓ William D. Kelley (Republican) 55.2%; ▌ William B. Thomas (Democratic) 44.8% |
| Pennsylvania 5 | Caleb N. Taylor | Republican | 1866 | Incumbent retired. Republican hold. | ▌ ✓ Alfred C. Harmer (Republican) 50.4%; ▌ John Roberts Reading (Democratic) 49.7% |
| Pennsylvania 6 | John D. Stiles | Democratic | 1868 | Incumbent retired. Democratic hold. | ▌ ✓ Ephraim Acker (Democratic) 52.1%; ▌ John A. Oliver (Republican) 47.9% |
| Pennsylvania 7 | Washington Townsend | Republican | 1868 | Incumbent re-elected. | ▌ ✓ Washington Townsend (Republican) 55.8%; ▌ J. Henry Askin (Democratic) 44.2% |
| Pennsylvania 8 | James Lawrence Getz | Democratic | 1866 | Incumbent re-elected. | ▌ ✓ James Lawrence Getz (Democratic) 67.4%; ▌ Nicholas Hunter (Republican) 32.6% |
| Pennsylvania 9 | Oliver James Dickey | Republican | 1868 | Incumbent re-elected. | ▌ ✓ Oliver James Dickey (Republican) 56.7%; ▌ Adam K. Witmer (Democratic) 43.3% |
| Pennsylvania 10 | Henry L. Cake | Republican | 1866 | Incumbent lost renomination. Republican hold. | ▌ ✓ John W. Killinger (Republican) 51.4%; ▌ Cyrus D. Gloninger (Democratic) 48.6% |
| Pennsylvania 11 | Daniel Myers Van Auken | Democratic | 1867 | Incumbent retired. Democratic hold. | ▌ ✓ John B. Storm (Democratic) 62.1%; ▌ William Davis (Republican) 26.2%; ▌ Jacob Kleinhaus (Independent) 11.7% |
| Pennsylvania 12 | George Washington Woodward | Democratic | 1867 | Incumbent retired. Republican gain. | ▌ ✓ Lazarus D. Shoemaker (Republican) 52.4%; ▌ Joseph B. McCollum (Democratic) 47.6% |
| Pennsylvania 13 | Ulysses Mercur | Republican | 1864 | Incumbent re-elected. | ▌ ✓ Ulysses Mercur (Republican) 50.3%; ▌ Charles B. Brockway (Democratic) 49.7% |
| Pennsylvania 14 | John B. Packer | Republican | 1868 | Incumbent re-elected. | ▌ ✓ John B. Packer (Republican) 54.7%; ▌ E. Greenough Scott (Democratic) 45.3% |
| Pennsylvania 15 | Richard Jacobs Haldeman | Democratic | 1868 | Incumbent re-elected. | ▌ ✓ Richard Jacobs Haldeman (Democratic) 57.1%; ▌ William B. Rober (Republican) 42.9% |
| Pennsylvania 16 | John Cessna | Republican | 1868 | Incumbent lost re-election. Democratic gain. | ▌ ✓ Benjamin F. Meyers (Democratic) 50.0%; ▌ John Cessna (Republican) 50.0% |
| Pennsylvania 17 | Daniel J. Morrell | Republican | 1866 | Incumbent lost re-election. Democratic gain. | ▌ ✓ R. Milton Speer (Democratic) 50.0%; ▌ Daniel J. Morrell (Republican) 50.0% |
| Pennsylvania 18 | William Hepburn Armstrong | Republican | 1868 | Incumbent lost re-election. Democratic gain. | ▌ ✓ Henry Sherwood (Democratic) 50.1%; ▌ William Hepburn Armstrong (Republican) 49.9% |
| Pennsylvania 19 | Glenni W. Scofield | Republican | 1862 | Incumbent re-elected. | ▌ ✓ Glenni W. Scofield (Republican) 51.2%; ▌ Selden Marvin (Democratic) 48.8% |
| Pennsylvania 20 | Calvin Willard Gilfillan | Republican | 1868 | Incumbent lost re-election. Democratic gain. | ▌ ✓ Samuel Griffith (Democratic) 51.4%; ▌ Calvin Willard Gilfillan (Republican) 48.6% |
| Pennsylvania 21 | John Covode | Republican | 1866 | Incumbent died. Democratic gain. | ▌ ✓ Henry Donnel Foster (Democratic) 51.5%; ▌ Andrew Stewart (Republican) 48.5% |
| Pennsylvania 22 | James S. Negley | Republican | 1868 | Incumbent re-elected. | ▌ ✓ James S. Negley (Republican) 54.5%; ▌ James Herron Hopkins (Democratic) 38.9%; ▌ William Frew (Ind. Republican) 6.7% |
| Pennsylvania 23 | Darwin Phelps | Republican | 1868 | Incumbent retired. Republican hold. | ▌ ✓ Ebenezer McJunkin (Republican) 58.6%; ▌ William Sirwell (Democratic) 41.4% |
| Pennsylvania 24 | Joseph Benton Donley | Republican | 1868 | Incumbent lost re-election. Democratic gain. | ▌ ✓ William McClelland (Democratic) 51.6%; ▌ Joseph Benton Donley (Republican) 48.4% |

== Rhode Island ==
| District | Incumbent | | | This race | |
| District | Member | Party | First elected | Results | Candidates |
|---|---|---|---|---|---|
| Rhode Island 1 | Thomas Jenckes | Republican | 1863 | Incumbent lost re-election. Republican hold. | ▌ ✓ Benjamin T. Eames (Republican) 50.9%; ▌ Thomas Jenckes (Republican) 20.3%; ▌ Nicholas Van Slyck (Democratic) 14.4%; ▌ Thomas Davis (Republican) 11.1%; ▌ Paul Mumford (Prohibition) 3.1% |
| Rhode Island 2 | Nathan F. Dixon II | Republican | 1863 | Incumbent retired. Republican hold. | ▌ ✓ James M. Pendleton (Republican) 57.7%; ▌ S. Rodman (Democratic) 37.2% |

== South Carolina ==
| District | Incumbent | | | This race | |
| District | Member | Party | First elected | Results | Candidates |
|---|---|---|---|---|---|
| South Carolina 1 | Benjamin Franklin Whittemore | Republican | 1868 | Incumbent resigned. Winner also elected to finish term. Republican hold. | ▌ ✓ Joseph Rainey (Republican) 63.5%; ▌ C. W. Dudley (Democratic-Conservative) 36.5% |
| South Carolina 2 | Christopher C. Bowen | Republican | 1868 | Incumbent lost re-election. Republican hold. | ▌ ✓ Robert C. De Large (Republican) 49.6%; ▌ Christopher C. Bowen (Republican) 46.7%; ▌ R. S. S. Tharin (Union Reform) 2.6% |
| South Carolina 3 | Solomon L. Hoge | Republican | 1868 | Incumbent retired. Republican hold. | ▌ ✓ Robert B. Elliott (Republican) 59.6%; ▌ John E. Bacon (Union Reform) 40.4% |
| South Carolina 4 | Alexander S. Wallace | Republican | 1868 | Incumbent re-elected. | ▌ ✓ Alexander S. Wallace (Republican) 55.3%; ▌ Isaac G. McKissick (Democratic-Conservative) 44.4% |

== Tennessee ==
| District | Incumbent | | | This race | |
| District | Member | Party | First elected | Results | Candidates |
|---|---|---|---|---|---|
| Tennessee 1 | Roderick R. Butler | Republican | 1867 | Incumbent re-elected. | ▌ ✓ Roderick R. Butler (Republican) 47.05%; ▌James White (Democratic) 42.72%; ▌Nathaniel G. Taylor (Independent Republican) 10.23% |
| Tennessee 2 | Horace Maynard | Republican | 1865 | Incumbent re-elected. | ▌ ✓ Horace Maynard (Republican) 51.49%; ▌A. Blizard (Democratic) 48.51% |
| Tennessee 3 | William B. Stokes | Republican | 1865 | Incumbent lost re-election. Democratic gain. | ▌ ✓ Abraham E. Garrett (Democratic) 69.73%; ▌William B. Stokes (Republican) 30.27% |
| Tennessee 4 | Lewis Tillman | Republican | 1868 | Incumbent retired. Democratic gain. | ▌ ✓ John M. Bright (Democratic) 86.52%; ▌James Mullins (Republican) 13.48% |
| Tennessee 5 | William F. Prosser | Republican | 1868 | Incumbent lost re-election. Democratic gain. | ▌ ✓ Edward I. Golladay (Democratic) 47.16%; ▌William F. Prosser (Republican) 32.04%; ▌Balie Peyton (Ind. Democratic) 20.80% |
| Tennessee 6 | Samuel M. Arnell | Republican | 1865 | Incumbent retired. Democratic gain. | ▌ ✓ Washington C. Whitthorne (Democratic) 67.78%; ▌T. J. Cypert (Republican) 21.52%; ▌J. B. Frierson (Republican) 10.70% |
| Tennessee 7 | Isaac R. Hawkins | Republican | 1865 | Incumbent retired. Democratic gain. | ▌ ✓ Robert P. Caldwell (Democratic) 81.66%; ▌John Norman (Republican) 18.34% |
| Tennessee 8 | William J. Smith | Republican | 1868 | Incumbent lost re-election. Democratic gain. | ▌ ✓ William W. Vaughan (Democratic) 61.83%; ▌William J. Smith (Republican) 23.63%; ▌E. Shaw (Ind. Republican) 14.54% |

== Texas ==
| District | Incumbent | | | This race | |
| District | Member | Party | First elected | Results | Candidates |
|---|---|---|---|---|---|
| Texas 1 | George W. Whitmore | Republican | 1869 | Incumbent lost re-election. Democratic gain. | ▌ ✓ William S. Herndon (Democratic) 58.3%; ▌ George W. Whitmore (Republican) 41.7% |
| Texas 2 | John C. Conner | Democratic | 1869 | Incumbent re-elected. | ▌ ✓ John C. Conner (Democratic) 75.5%; ▌ Anthony M. Bryant (Republican) 24.6% |
| Texas 3 | William Thomas Clark | Republican | 1869 | Incumbent lost re-election. Democratic gain. | ▌ ✓ D. C. Giddings (Democratic) 53.4%; ▌ William Thomas Clark (Republican) 46.6% |
| Texas 4 | Edward Degener | Republican | 1869 | Incumbent lost re-election. Democratic gain. | ▌ ✓ John Hancock (Democratic) 57.4%; ▌ Edward Degener (Republican) 42.6% |

== Utah Territory ==
See Non-voting delegates, below.

== Vermont ==
| District | Incumbent | | | This race | |
| District | Member | Party | First elected | Results | Candidates |
|---|---|---|---|---|---|
| Vermont 1 | Charles W. Willard | Republican | 1868 | Incumbent re-elected. | ▌ ✓ Charles W. Willard (Republican) 66.1%; ▌John Cain (Democratic) 23.9%; ▌Ahiman S. Miner (Republican) 9.7%; ▌Frederick E. Woodbridge (Republican) 1.0%; ▌Loyal C. Kellogg (Republican) 0.6% |
| Vermont 2 | Luke P. Poland | Republican | 1866 | Incumbent re-elected | ▌ ✓ Luke P. Poland (Republican) 76.4%; ▌Lewis L. Partridge (Democratic) 23.4% |
| Vermont 3 | Worthington C. Smith | Republican | 1866 | Incumbent re-elected. | ▌ ✓ Worthington C. Smith (Republican) 74.8%; ▌Henry Gillett (Democratic) 25.0% |

== Virginia ==
| District | Incumbent | | | This race | |
| District | Member | Party | First elected | Results | Candidates |
|---|---|---|---|---|---|
| Virginia 1 | Richard S. Ayer | Radical | 1869 | Incumbent retired. Conservative gain. | ▌ ✓ John Critcher (Conservative) 46.3%; ▌ Walter W. Douglas (Radical) 29.9%; ▌ Daniel M. Norton (Radical) 23.9% |
| Virginia 2 | James H. Platt Jr. | Radical | 1869 | Incumbent re-elected. | ▌ ✓ James H. Platt Jr. (Radical) 59.2%; ▌ Robert B. Bolling (Conservative) 40.7% |
| Virginia 3 | Charles H. Porter | Radical | 1869 | Incumbent re-elected. | ▌ ✓ Charles H. Porter (Radical) 56.0%; ▌ Albert Ordway (Conservative) 44.0% |
| Virginia 4 | George Booker | Conservative | 1869 | Incumbent retired. Radical gain. | ▌ ✓ William H. H. Stowell (Radical) 56.9%; ▌ William L. Owen (Conservative) 43.1% |
| Virginia 5 | Robert Ridgway | Conservative | 1869 | Incumbent died. Winner also elected to finish term. Conservative hold. | ▌ ✓ Richard T. W. Duke (Conservative) 52.4%; ▌ Alexander Rives (Radical) 47.6% |
| Virginia 6 | William Milnes Jr. | Conservative | 1869 | Incumbent retired. Conservative hold. | ▌ ✓ John T. Harris (Conservative) 49.3%; ▌ Corbin M Reynolds (Independent) 32.3%; ▌ Edwin Gray (Radical) 18.5% |
| Virginia 7 | Lewis McKenzie | Conservative | 1869 | Incumbent lost re-election as a Radical candidate. Conservative hold. | ▌ ✓ Elliott M. Braxton (Conservative) 53.1%; ▌ Lewis McKenzie (Radical) 46.8% |
| Virginia 8 | James K. Gibson | Conservative | 1869 | Incumbent retired. Conservative hold. | ▌ ✓ William Terry (Conservative) 56.9%; ▌ Fayette McMullen (Independent) 23.0%; ▌ Robert William Hughes (Radical) 20.1% |

== Washington Territory ==
See Non-voting delegates, below.

== West Virginia ==
| District | Incumbent | | | This race | |
| District | Member | Party | First elected | Results | Candidates |
|---|---|---|---|---|---|
| West Virginia 1 | Isaac H. Duval | Republican | 1868 | Incumbent retired. Democratic gain. | ▌ ✓ John J. Davis (Democratic) 52.39%; ▌Nathan Goff Jr. (Republican) 47.61% |
| West Virginia 2 | James McGrew | Republican | 1868 | Incumbent re-elected. | ▌ ✓ James McGrew (Republican) 52.67%; ▌O. P. Downey (Democratic) 47.33% |
| West Virginia 3 | John Witcher | Republican | 1868 | Incumbent lost re-election. Democratic gain. | ▌ ✓ Frank Hereford (Democratic) 54.85%; ▌John Witcher (Republican) 45.15% |

== Wisconsin ==
Wisconsin elected six members of congress on Election Day, November 8, 1870.

| District | Incumbent | | | This race | |
| District | Member | Party | First elected | Results | Candidates |
|---|---|---|---|---|---|
| Wisconsin 1 | Halbert E. Paine | Republican | 1864 | Incumbent retired. Democratic gain. | ▌ ✓ Alexander Mitchell (Democratic) 57.5%; ▌William P. Lyon (Republican) 42.5% |
| Wisconsin 2 | David Atwood | Republican | 1870 (special) | Incumbent retired. Republican hold. | ▌ ✓ Gerry Whiting Hazelton (Republican) 54.5%; ▌Amasa G. Cook (Democratic) 45.5% |
| Wisconsin 3 | Amasa Cobb | Republican | 1862 | Incumbent retired. Republican hold. | ▌ ✓ J. Allen Barber (Republican) 58.5%; ▌John Strachan (Democratic) 41.5% |
| Wisconsin 4 | Charles A. Eldredge | Democratic | 1862 | Incumbent re-elected. | ▌ ✓ Charles A. Eldredge (Democratic) 62.4%; ▌Jerome Anthony Watrous (Republican) 37.6% |
| Wisconsin 5 | Philetus Sawyer | Republican | 1864 | Incumbent re-elected. | ▌ ✓ Philetus Sawyer (Republican) 59.3%; ▌Joseph Stringham (Democratic) 40.7% |
| Wisconsin 6 | Cadwallader C. Washburn | Republican | 1866 | Incumbent retired. Republican hold. | ▌ ✓ Jeremiah McLain Rusk (Republican) 61.3%; ▌Alexander Meggett (Democratic) 38.7% |

== Wyoming Territory ==
See Non-voting delegates, below.

== Non-voting delegates ==
Colorado results by county Chaffee: 50–60% 60–70% 80–90% Miller: 50–60%

| District | Incumbent | | | This race | |
| District | Delegate | Party | First elected | Results | Candidates |
|---|---|---|---|---|---|
| Arizona Territory at-large | Richard C. McCormick | Republican | 1869 | Incumbent re-elected. | ▌ ✓ Richard C. McCormick (Republican) 100% |
| Colorado Territory at-large | Allen A. Bradford | Republican | 1868 | Unknown if incumbent retired or lost renomination. Republican hold. | ▌ ✓ Jerome B. Chaffee (Republican) 56.05%; ▌[FNU] Miller (Unknown) 43.95% |
| Dakota Territory at-large | Solomon L. Spink | Republican | 1868 | Incumbent lost re-election as a Democrat. Independent Democratic gain. | ▌ ✓ Moses K. Armstrong (Ind. Democratic) 34.27%; ▌Walter A. Burleigh (Republican) 34.09%; ▌Solomon L. Spink (Republican) 31.64% |
| District of Columbia at-large | New district | | | New seat. New delegate elected in 1871. Republican gain. | ▌ ✓ Norton P. Chipman (Republican); [data missing] |
| Idaho Territory at-large | Jacob K. Shafer | Democratic | 1868 | Incumbent lost renomination. Democratic hold. | ▌ ✓ Samuel A. Merritt (Democratic) 59.24%; ▌T. J. Butler (Republican) 40.74%; ▌J. L. Butler (Independent) 0.02% |
| Montana Territory at-large | James M. Cavanaugh | Democratic | 1859 (Minn.); 1861 (lost); 1868 | Incumbent lost renomination. New delegate elected August 7, 1871. Republican gain. | ▌ ✓ William H. Clagett (Republican) 52.04%; ▌Edwin W. Toole (Democratic) 47.96% |
| New Mexico Territory at-large | José F. Chaves | Republican | 1868 | Incumbent lost re-election. Democratic gain. | ▌José M. Gallegos (Democratic) 100%; ▌José F. Chaves (Republican) 0% |
| Utah Territory at-large | William H. Hooper | Democratic | 1864 | Incumbent re-elected. | ▌William H. Hooper (Democratic) 93.75%; ▌George R. Maxwell (Republican) 6.25% |
| Washington Territory at-large | Selucius Garfielde | Republican | 1868 | Incumbent re-elected June 6, 1870. | ▌ ✓ Selucius Garfielde (Republican) 54.56%; ▌James D. Mix (Democratic) 43.00%; ▌Marshall Blinn (Ind. Republican) 2.44% |
| Wyoming Territory at-large | Stephen F. Nuckolls | Democratic | 1869 | Incumbent retired. Republican gain. | ▌ ✓ William T. Jones (Republican) 52.13%; ▌John Wanless (Democratic) 45.03%; ▌[FNU] Murrin (Ind. Democratic) 2.85% |

== See also ==
- 1870 United States elections
  - 1870–71 United States Senate elections
- 41st United States Congress
- 42nd United States Congress

== Bibliography ==
- Dubin, Michael J. (March 1, 1998). United States Congressional Elections, 1788-1997: The Official Results of the Elections of the 1st Through 105th Congresses. McFarland and Company. ISBN 978-0786402830.
- Martis, Kenneth C. (January 1, 1989). The Historical Atlas of Political Parties in the United States Congress, 1789-1989. Macmillan Publishing Company. ISBN 978-0029201701.
- Moore, John L., ed. (1994). Congressional Quarterly's Guide to U.S. Elections (Third ed.). Congressional Quarterly Inc. ISBN 978-0871879967.
- Parrish, William E. (1973). A History of Missouri, Volume 3: 1860 to 1875. Columbia: University of Missouri Press. ISBN 978-0-8262-0108-9.
- "Party Divisions of the House of Representatives* 1789–Present". Office of the Historian, House of United States House of Representatives.
