= Robert E. Preston =

Director of the United States Mint (1836–1911)

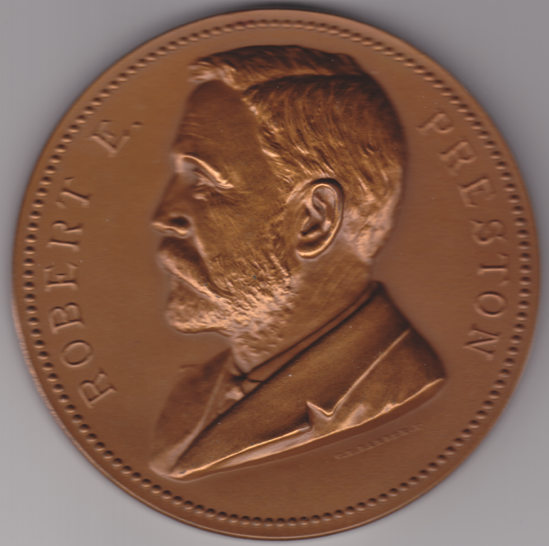

Director of the United States Mint
- In office November 1893 – February 1898
- President: Grover Cleveland; William McKinley
- Preceded by: Edward O. Leech
- Succeeded by: George E. Roberts

Personal details
- Born: 1836 Bean Station, Tennessee, U.S.
- Died: June 24, 1911 (aged 74–75)
- Resting place: Oak Hill Cemetery; Washington, D.C., U.S.

Robert E. Preston (1836 – June 24, 1911) was Director of the United States Mint from 1893 to 1898.

== Biography ==
Preston was born in Bean Station, Tennessee in 1836. In 1856, United States Secretary of the Treasury James Guthrie appointed Preston to a clerkship in the office of the first auditor. He rose through the ranks in that office and was responsible for auditing the accounts of the United States Mint. He married Ellen Lasselle, with whom he had one daughter, Nannie M. Preston.

When the Mint Bureau was created by the Coinage Act of 1873, Henry Linderman, the Director of the United States Mint, encouraged Preston to join the Mint Bureau. Preston served as Computer of Bullion, Assay Clerk, Adjuster of Accounts, and Mint Examiner. At several times, he served as acting director of the United States Mint in the absence of Linderman and his successors, Horatio C. Burchard and James P. Kimball.

In 1893, President of the United States Grover Cleveland named Preston Director of the United States Mint. Preston's appointment was strictly on the basis of merit; with the free silver question raging, Cleveland wanted to appoint a nonpartisan as Mint Director. Preston held office from November 1893 until February 1898, after which he reentered the Mint Service as an Examiner. He died June 24, 1911, purportedly at the age of 77, and was buried June 27 at the Oak Hill Cemetery in Washington, D.C.

Government offices
Preceded by Edward O. Leech	Director of the United States Mint; November 1893 – February 1898	Succeeded by George E. Roberts
