= Huron Institute =

School in Milan, Ohio, US

The Huron Institute was a school located in Milan in the U.S. state of Ohio, in what was then Huron County.

The Huron Institute owed its existence to the extensive revivals of religion in the churches of Huron Presbytery in the years 1830 and 1831. The Institute was incorporated by act of the Ohio General Assembly in 1832. With the local people being eager for the school to open, the first term was begun in April 1832 several months before the school building was completed in December 1832. Construction costs were $4,000, with $2,000 being raised by the Huron Presbytery and the balance being raised by the village of Milan.

Reverend Elded Barber was the first principal and the purpose of the school as stated in the Board of Trustees minutes was to provide "instruction to youth of both sexes in the higher branches of English education, the learned languages and the liberal arts and sciences."

It was the desire of the trustees of the institute to place education within the reach of all who would avail themselves of it, and in this they succeeded as nearly as was possible. The tuition was fixed at four dollars per quarter in the classical department, and at three dollars in the English and female department, and the principal took it upon himself to furnish instruction from the avails of the tuition bills. Board was furnished by many of the best families in Milan at merely nominal rates. No student was ever refused admission or dismissed because too poor to pay his way in the institute.

At the time it was established, it was the only school on the Western Reserve west of Hudson where young men could be prepared for college.

The Huron Institute closed in 1857 and re-opened as the Western Reserve Normal School in the next year. The Normal School continued to operate until 1889 when it closed. The building remained standing until 1910 when it was razed.

== Notable alumni ==
- Omar D. Conger, U.S. Representative and U.S. Senator from Michigan
- Moses K. Armstrong, Delegate to the United States House of Representatives from Dakota Territory

== Sources ==
- MILAN TOWNSHIP, Erie County, Ohio from HISTORY OF HURON AND ERIE COUNTIES, OHIO 1879 by W.W.Williams pages 458-465
