= Robert M. A. Hawk =

American politician

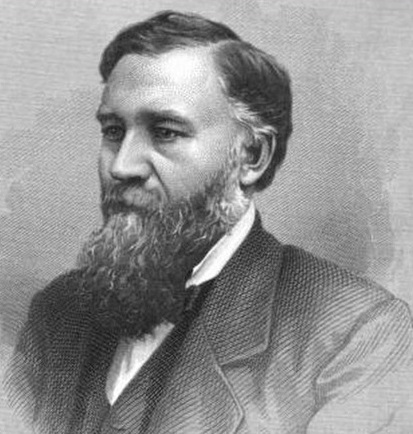
- From 1883's Memorial Addresses on the Life and Character of Robert M. A. Hawk (A Representative from Illinois)

Member of the U.S. House of Representatives from Illinois's 5th district
- In office March 4, 1879 – June 29, 1882
- Preceded by: Horatio C. Burchard
- Succeeded by: Robert R. Hitt

Personal details
- Born: April 23, 1839 near Rushville, Indiana, U.S.
- Died: June 29, 1882 (aged 43) Washington, D.C., U.S.
- Party: Republican

Robert Moffett Allison Hawk (April 23, 1839 – June 29, 1882) was a U.S. representative from Illinois.

Born near Rushville, Indiana, Hawk moved with his parents to Freedom Township, Carroll County, Illinois, in 1844. He attended the common and select schools of Carroll County, Illinois, and Eureka College. He studied law but never practiced. He entered the Union Army during the Civil War as first lieutenant September 4, 1862. He was promoted to captain on January 1, 1863. Brevetted major April 10, 1865. He moved to Mount Carroll, Illinois, in 1865 and engaged in agricultural pursuits. He served as clerk of the court of Carroll County, Illinois, from December 13, 1865, to February 27, 1879.

Hawk was elected as a Republican to the Forty-sixth and Forty-seventh Congresses and served from March 4, 1879, until his death in Washington, D.C., June 29, 1882. He was interred in Oak Hill Cemetery, Mount Carroll, Illinois.

== See also ==
- List of members of the United States Congress who died in office (1790–1899)

U.S. House of Representatives
| Preceded by Horatio C. Burchard | Member of the U.S. House of Representatives from Illinois's 5th congressional district 1879–1882 | Succeeded by Robert R. Hitt |
