= James P. Kimball =

American metallurgist and geologist (1836-1913)

16th Director of the United States Mint
- In office July 1885 – October 1889
- President: Grover Cleveland; Benjamin Harrison
- Preceded by: Horatio C. Burchard
- Succeeded by: Edward O. Leech

Personal details
- Born: James Putnam Kimball; April 26, 1836 Salem, Massachusetts, U.S.
- Died: October 23, 1913 (aged 77) Cody, Wyoming, U.S.
- Spouse: Mary Elizabeth Farley (m. 1874)
- Children: 3
- Education: Lawrence Scientific School; Humboldt University of Berlin; University of Göttingen (PhD); Freiberg University of Mining and Technology
- Profession: Metallurgist, geologist

Military service
- Allegiance: United States
- Branch/service: Union Army
- Rank: Captain
- Battles/wars: American Civil War; Second Battle of Bull Run; Battle of Chantilly; Battle of South Mountain; Battle of Antietam; Battle of Fredericksburg; Battle of Chancellorsville; Battle of Gettysburg

James Putnam Kimball (April 26, 1836 – October 23, 1913) was an American metallurgist and geologist who was Director of the United States Mint from 1885 to 1889.

== Biography ==
James P. Kimball was born in Salem, Massachusetts on April 26, 1836. In 1854, he entered the Lawrence Scientific School of Harvard University; after a year he traveled to Berlin to study at the Friedrich-Wilhelms-Universität; he then transferred to the Georg-August-Universität in Göttingen, receiving a Ph.D. in 1857. He then enrolled in mining studies at the Technische Universität Bergakademie Freiberg in Freiberg, Saxony.

After making a tour of Europe, Kimball returned to the United States to become an assistant to Harvard University geology professor Josiah Whitney. As Whitney's assistant, Kimball participated in the geological surveys of the lead mining regions of Wisconsin, Illinois, and southeastern Iowa.

When the New York State Agricultural College (later merged into Cornell University) was founded in Ovid, New York, Kimball became Professor of Chemistry and Economic Geology. With the outbreak of the American Civil War in 1861, the college's president, Maj. M. R. Patrick was appointed Brigadier-General of Volunteers; Kimball became Brig. Gen. Patrick's Chief of Staff, with the rank of Captain. He saw field service under Maj. Gen. Irvin McDowell, and was present at the Second Battle of Bull Run (August 28–30, 1862); the Battle of Chantilly (September 1, 1862); the Battle of South Mountain (September 14, 1862); the Battle of Antietam (September 17, 1862); the Battle of Fredericksburg (December 11–15, 1862); the Battle of Chancellorsville (April 30-May 6, 1863); and the Battle of Gettysburg (July 1–3, 1863). Brig. Gen. Patrick was then appointed Provost Marshal of the Army of the Potomac, and Capt. Kimball accompanied him there, serving on the General Staff under Generals George B. McClellan, Ambrose Burnside, Joseph Hooker, and George Meade successively.

When the army went into winter quarters, Kimball resigned to resume his life as a mining engineer based in New York City. During the 1860s and 1870s he investigated coal and iron mines in Pennsylvania, and silver mines in Chihuahua, Mexico, west Texas, and Utah. He also made recommendations on plant designs, based on European metallurgical practice. After his marriage in 1874, he became an honorary professor of Lehigh University, Bethlehem, Pa. and relocated there, while his professional office remained in New York City. He was among the first American geologists to inspect and write about the mineral resources of Cuba and South America.

He was an early member of the American Institute of Mining Engineers, contributed to its Transactions, and served as a vice-president during 1881-1882.

He became president of the Everett Iron Company, which played a major role in developing mines in Bedford County, Pennsylvania in 1883-84.

In 1885, President of the United States Grover Cleveland named Kimball Director of the United States Mint and Kimball held that office from July 1885 until October 1889. He is best known for his report criticizing the quality of the coinage, which led to improvement in mint equipment. He later served on the annual "Assay Commission" appointed by the President to ensure quality in coinage.

During the 1890s-1900s he resumed his consultant business in New York City. By 1902, he had helped develop the coal fields of Red Lodge, Montana, where he relocated late in life with his son's family. Upon his death the respected Mining & Scientific Press of San Francisco called him "one of the pioneer mining geologists of America" and one who "left a record of clean honorable work."

Kimball married Mary Elizabeth Farley July 22, 1874 in Cambridge, Massachusetts. They had three children: Russell, named after a Revolutionary era ancestor, Edith, and Farley. Kimball died in Cody, Wyoming October 23, 1913.

Government offices
Preceded by Horatio C. Burchard	Director of the United States Mint; July 1885 – October 1889	Succeeded by Edward O. Leech
