= Moses K. Armstrong =

American politician (1832–1906)

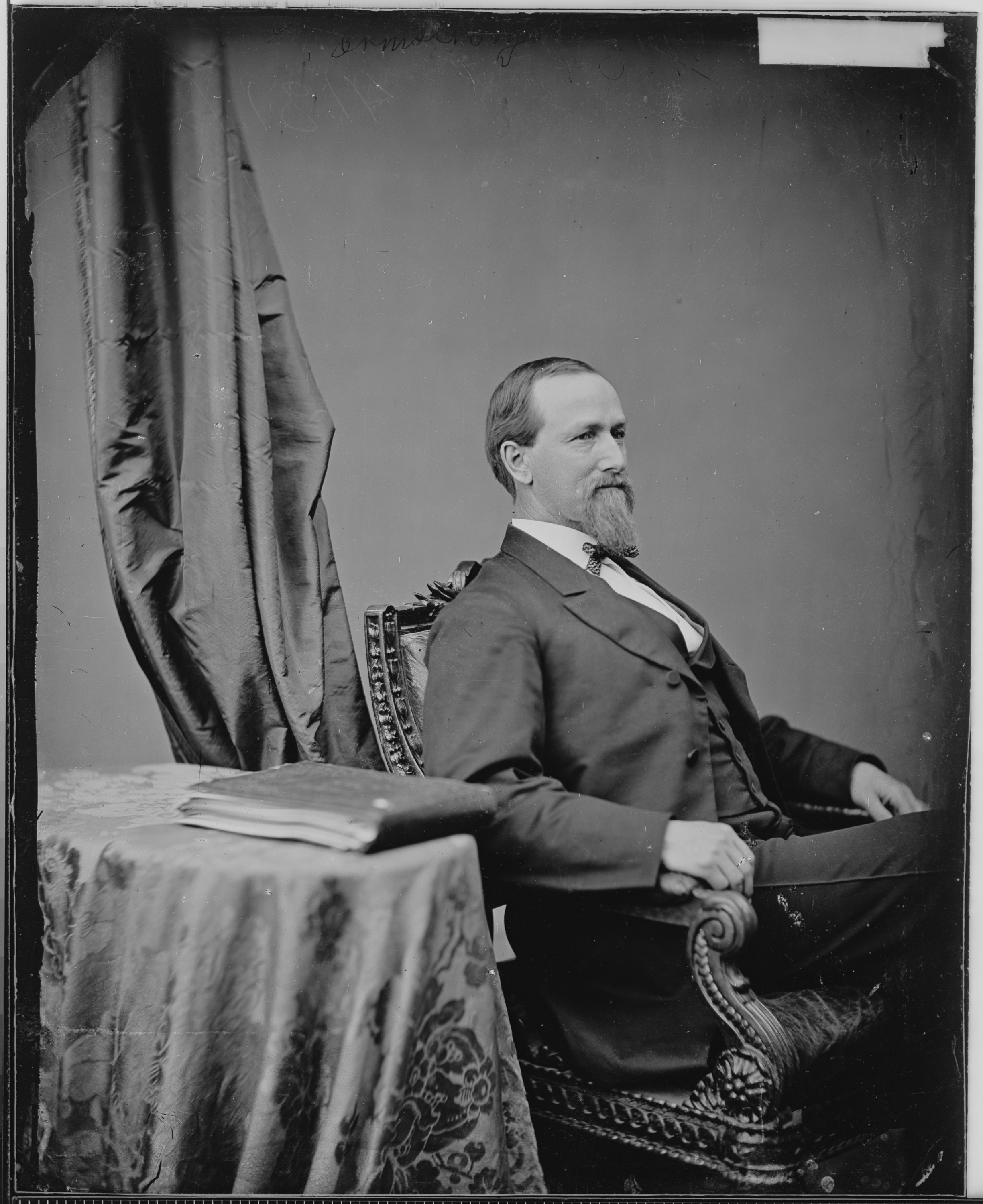

Member of the U.S. House of Representatives from Dakota Territory's at-large district
- In office March 4, 1871 – March 3, 1875 (Delegate)
- Preceded by: Solomon Lewis Spink
- Succeeded by: Jefferson Parish Kidder

Personal details
- Born: September 19, 1832 Milan, Ohio, U.S.
- Died: January 11, 1906 (aged 73) Albert Lea, Minnesota, U.S.
- Resting place: Lakewood Cemetery
- Party: Democratic

Moses Kimball Armstrong (September 19, 1832 – January 11, 1906) was an American surveyor who served as a delegate from Dakota Territory to the United States House of Representatives.

== Life ==
Armstrong was born in Milan, Erie County, Ohio. He attended the Huron Institute in Milan and Western Reserve College in Cleveland, Ohio, then moved to the Minnesota Territory in 1856. He was elected surveyor of Mower County, and was assigned to survey federal lands.

When Minnesota was admitted to the Union, Armstrong moved to Yankton, Dakota Territory, then a small Native American village. He was a member of the first Territorial House of Representatives in 1861, was reelected in 1862 and 1863, and served as speaker in 1863. He became editor of the Dakota Union newspaper in 1864, and was appointed clerk of the territorial Supreme Court in 1865. He was elected to the territorial council in 1866 and in 1867, and served as the council's president.

In 1867, Armstrong acted as secretary of the Indian peace commission in Dakota Territory. Continuing as a surveyor, he established the great meridian and standard lines for United States surveys in southern Dakota and in the northern Red River Valley. He was again elected to the Territorial council in 1869. In 1870 he was elected as a Democrat to the United States House of Representatives; he was reelected in 1872, and served from March 4, 1871 to March 3, 1875.

Armstrong was an unsuccessful candidate for reelection in 1874, and moved to St. James, Watonwan County, Minnesota, where he engaged in banking and in real estate.

He died at Albert Lea, Minnesota, and is buried in the Lakewood Cemetery in Minneapolis.

U.S. House of Representatives
Preceded by Solomon L. Spink	Delegate to the U.S. House of Representatives from Dakota Territory; March 4, 1871 – March 3, 1875	Succeeded by Jefferson P. Kidder
