= Solomon L. Spink =

American politician (1831–1881)

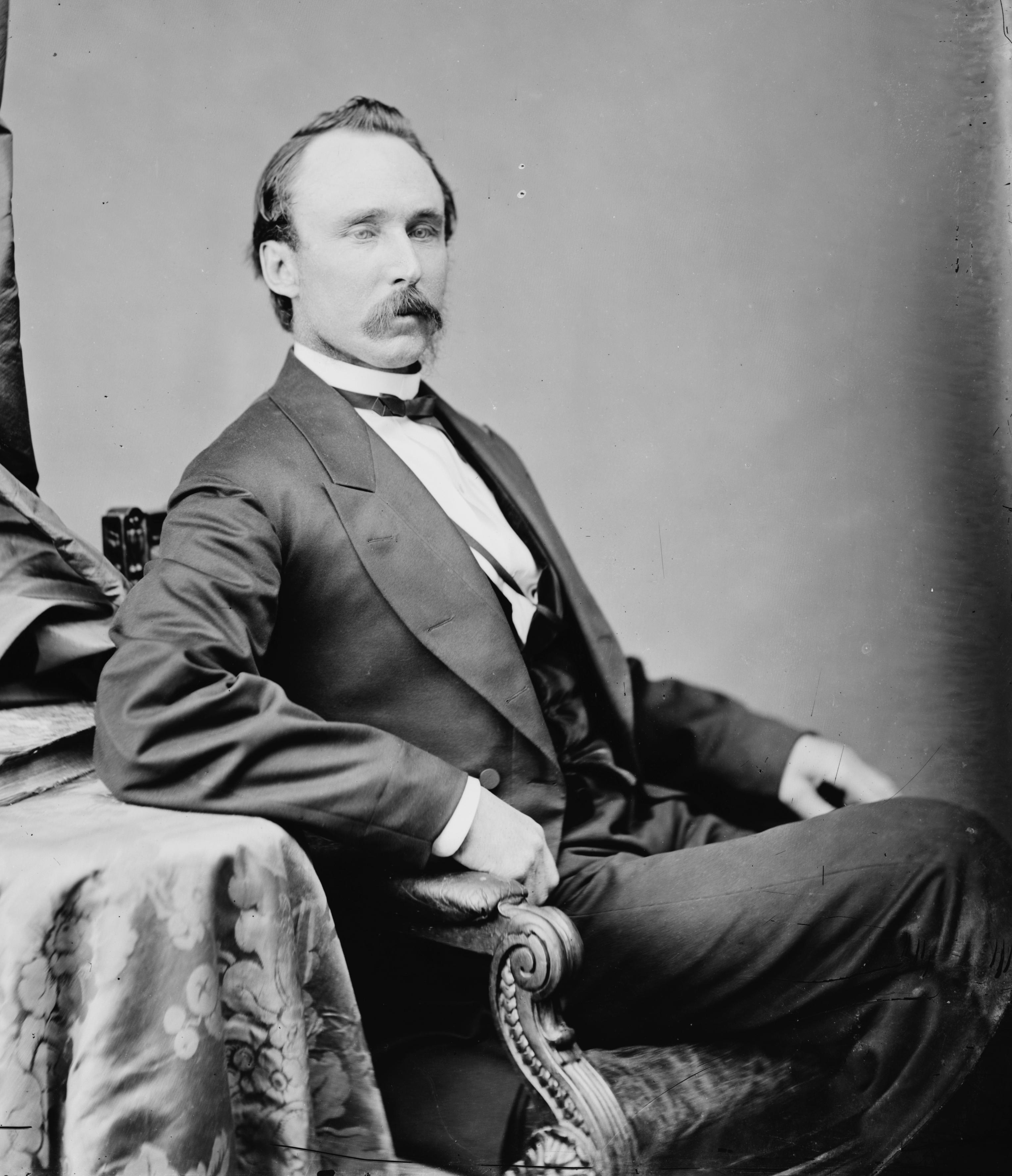
- Brady-Handy collection portrait of Spink, taken between 1860 and 1875

Member of the U.S. House of Representatives from Dakota Territory's at-large district
- In office March 4, 1869 – March 3, 1871 (Delegate)
- Preceded by: Walter A. Burleigh
- Succeeded by: Moses K. Armstrong

Member of the Illinois House of Representatives from the Edgar County district
- In office 1864

Personal details
- Born: Solomon Lewis Spink; March 20, 1831 Whitehall, New York, US
- Died: September 22, 1881 (aged 50) Yankton, South Dakota, US
- Party: Republican
- Occupation: Politician

Solomon Lewis Spink (March 20, 1831 – September 22, 1881) was an American politician. A Republican, he was a delegate to the United States House of Representatives from the Dakota Territory.

== Biography ==
Spink was born on March 20, 1832, in Whitehall, New York. A graduate of Castleton Seminary, he worked as an educator between Maryland and New York, among other states. He studied law, and in 1856, was admitted to the bar, after which he commenced practice in Burlington, Iowa. In 1860, he moved to Paris, Illinois, where he was editor of the Prairie Beacon, a local newspaper. He purchased the newspaper from Jacob Harding and eventually sold it to William Moore.

Spink was a Republican. In 1864, he represented Edgar County in the Illinois House of Representatives. From 1865 to 1869, he was Secretary of the Dakota Territory, being appointed by President Abraham Lincoln on April 13, 1865, a day before being assassinated. He served until 1869. After being appointed, he moved to Yankton.

Spink was elected at-large to be a delegate to the United States House of Representatives, serving from March 4, 1869, to March 3, 1871. He supported the temperance movement. He lost the following election, then again ran unsuccessfully in 1876. Also in 1876, he was a delegate to the Centennial Exposition. The Union and Dakotian described him as a "magician" for the Democratic Party upon Congress.

After serving in Congress, Spink returned to practicing law in Yankton. He also founded The Yankton Press, a newspaper. He was a Freemason. He died on September 22, 1881, aged 50, in Yankton, and was buried at the Yankton Municipal Cemetery. He is the namesake of Spink County, South Dakota.

U.S. House of Representatives
| Preceded by Walter A. Burleigh | Delegate to the U.S. House of Representatives from Dakota Territory's at-large congressional district March 4, 1869 – March 3, 1871 | Succeeded by Moses K. Armstrong |
