= Bradford N. Stevens =

American politician

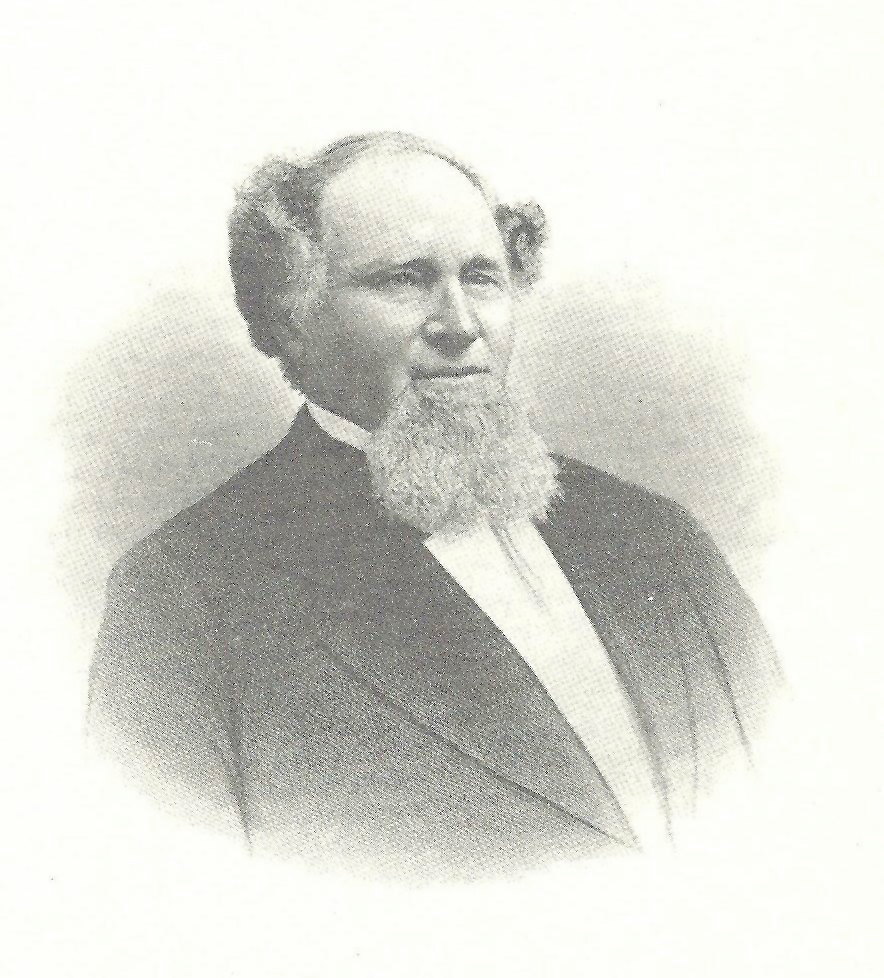

Member of the U.S. House of Representatives from Illinois's 5th district
- In office March 4, 1871 – March 3, 1873
- Preceded by: Ebon C. Ingersoll
- Succeeded by: Horatio C. Burchard

Personal details
- Born: January 3, 1813 Boscawen, New Hampshire, U.S.
- Died: November 10, 1885 (aged 72) Tiskilwa, Illinois, U.S.
- Party: Democratic

Bradford Newcomb Stevens (January 3, 1813 – November 10, 1885) was a U.S. representative from Illinois.

Born in Boscawen, New Hampshire, Stevens attended schools in New Hampshire and at Montreal, Quebec, Canada, and graduated from Dartmouth College, Hanover, New Hampshire, in 1835. He taught school six years in Hopkinsville, Kentucky, and New York City. He moved to Bureau County, Illinois, in 1846, where he engaged in mercantile and agricultural pursuits, and also worked as county surveyor. He served as mayor of Tiskilwa, Illinois.

Stevens was elected as a Democrat to the Forty-second Congress (March 4, 1871 – March 3, 1873). He resumed mercantile and agricultural pursuits. He died in Tiskilwa, Illinois, on November 10, 1885. He was interred in Mount Bloom Cemetery.

U.S. House of Representatives
Preceded by Ebon C. Ingersoll	Member of the U.S. House of Representatives from Illinois's 5th congressional district 1871–1873	Succeeded by Horatio C. Burchard
