= Ebon C. Ingersoll =

American politician (1831–1879)

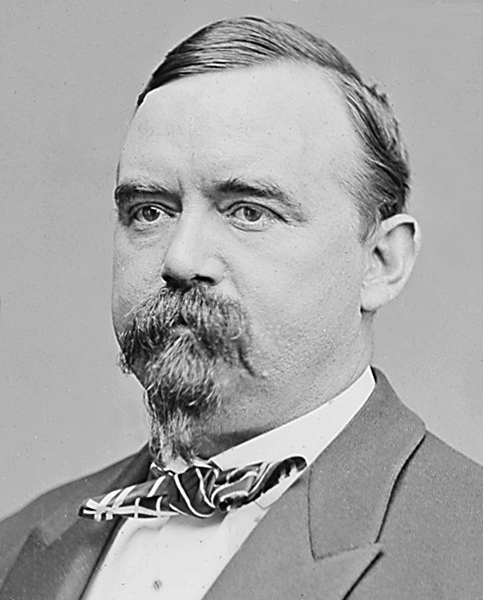

Member of the U.S. House of Representatives from Illinois's 5th district
- In office May 20, 1864 – March 3, 1871
- Preceded by: Owen Lovejoy
- Succeeded by: Bradford N. Stevens

Member of the Illinois House of Representatives
- In office 1856

Personal details
- Born: Ebon Clark Ingersoll; December 12, 1831 Dresden, New York, U.S.
- Died: May 31, 1879 (aged 47) Washington, D.C., U.S.
- Resting place: Oak Hill Cemetery (Washington, D.C.)
- Party: Republican
- Relatives: Robert G. Ingersoll (brother)

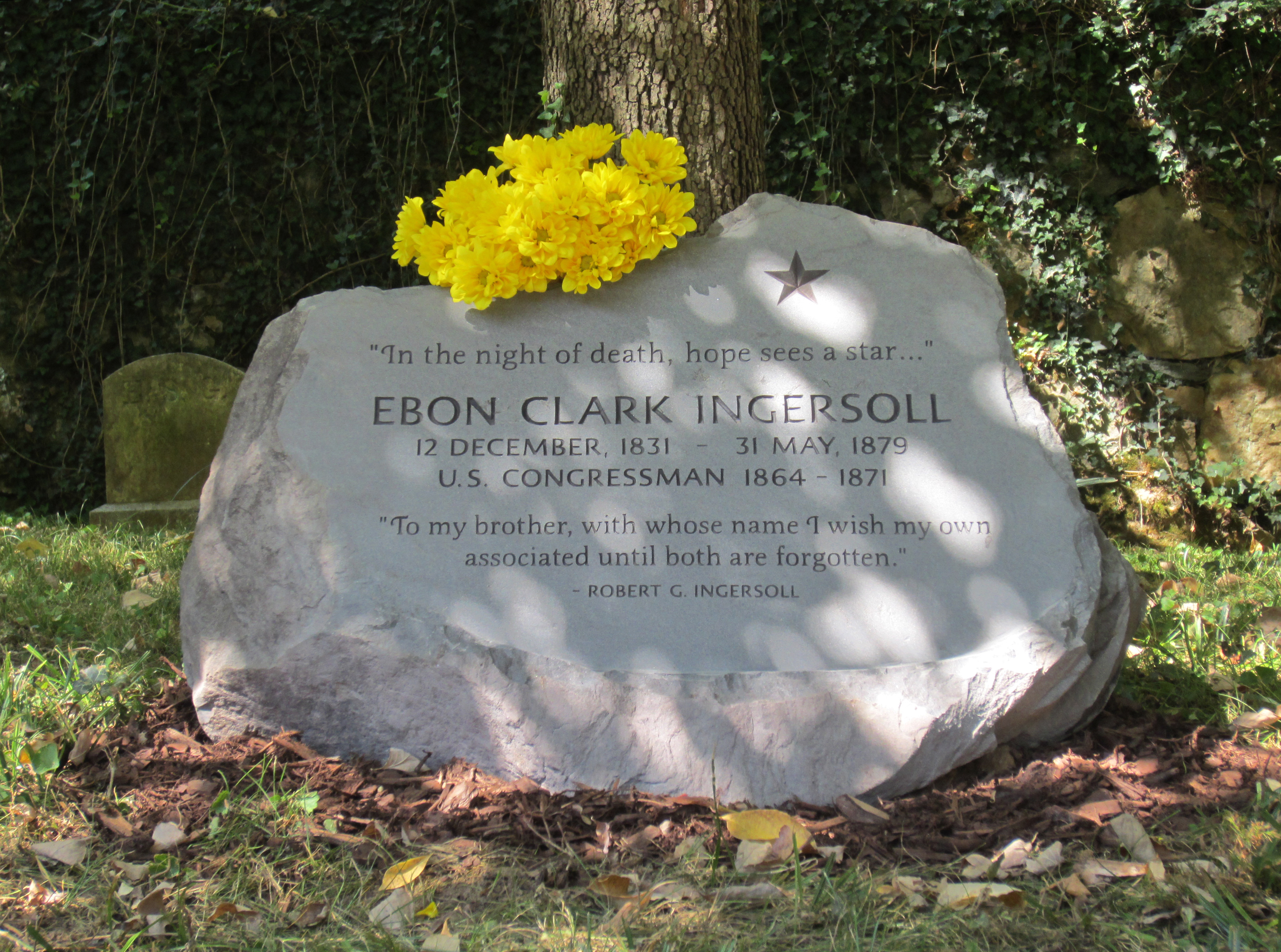
Gravesite of Ebon Clark Ingersoll, Oak Hill Cemetery (Washington, D.C.)

Ebon Clark Ingersoll (December 12, 1831 – May 31, 1879) was a U.S. representative from Illinois and the brother of the politician and orator Robert G. Ingersoll.

Born in Dresden, New York, Ingersoll moved to Wisconsin Territory in 1843 and subsequently to Illinois. He pursued classical studies in Peoria, Illinois, and in Paducah, Kentucky. He studied law. He was admitted to the bar in 1854 and commenced practice in Peoria, Illinois. He served as a member of the Illinois House of Representatives in 1856.

Ingersoll was elected as a Republican to the Thirty-eighth Congress to fill the vacancy caused by the death of Owen Lovejoy. He was re-elected to the Thirty-ninth, Fortieth, and Forty-first Congresses and served from May 20, 1864, to March 3, 1871. He served as chairman of the Committee on District of Columbia (Thirty-ninth and Fortieth Congresses), Committee on Roads and Canals (Forty-first Congress), Committee on Railways and Canals (Forty-first Congress). He was an unsuccessful candidate for re-election in 1870 to the Forty-second Congress. He settled in Washington, D.C., and engaged in the practice of law until his death there on May 31, 1879. A eulogy given at his funeral by his brother Robert was later included in an anthology compiled by Clarence Darrow and Wallace Rice. He was interred in Oak Hill Cemetery.

Ingersoll had a son, John Carter Ingersoll, who served as the American Consul in Copenhagen, Denmark and Cartagena, Colombia. He died in Colon, Colombia, in 1903.

U.S. House of Representatives
Preceded by Owen Lovejoy	Member of the U.S. House of Representatives from Illinois's 5th congressional district 1864–1871	Succeeded by Bradford N. Stevens
