= John Strachan (politician) =

American politician

John Strachan was an American politician. He was a member of the Wisconsin State Assembly.

== Biography ==
Strachan was born on June 13, 1834, in Aberdeen, Scotland. He graduated from what is now the University of Aberdeen. Later, he was a member of the United States Army during the Coeur d'Alene War.

== Political career ==
Strachan was a member of the Assembly during the 1872 session. Previously, he was an unsuccessful candidate for the United States House of Representatives from Wisconsin's 3rd congressional district, losing to J. Allen Barber. Strachan was a Democrat.
