= Omar D. Conger =

American politician (1818–1898)

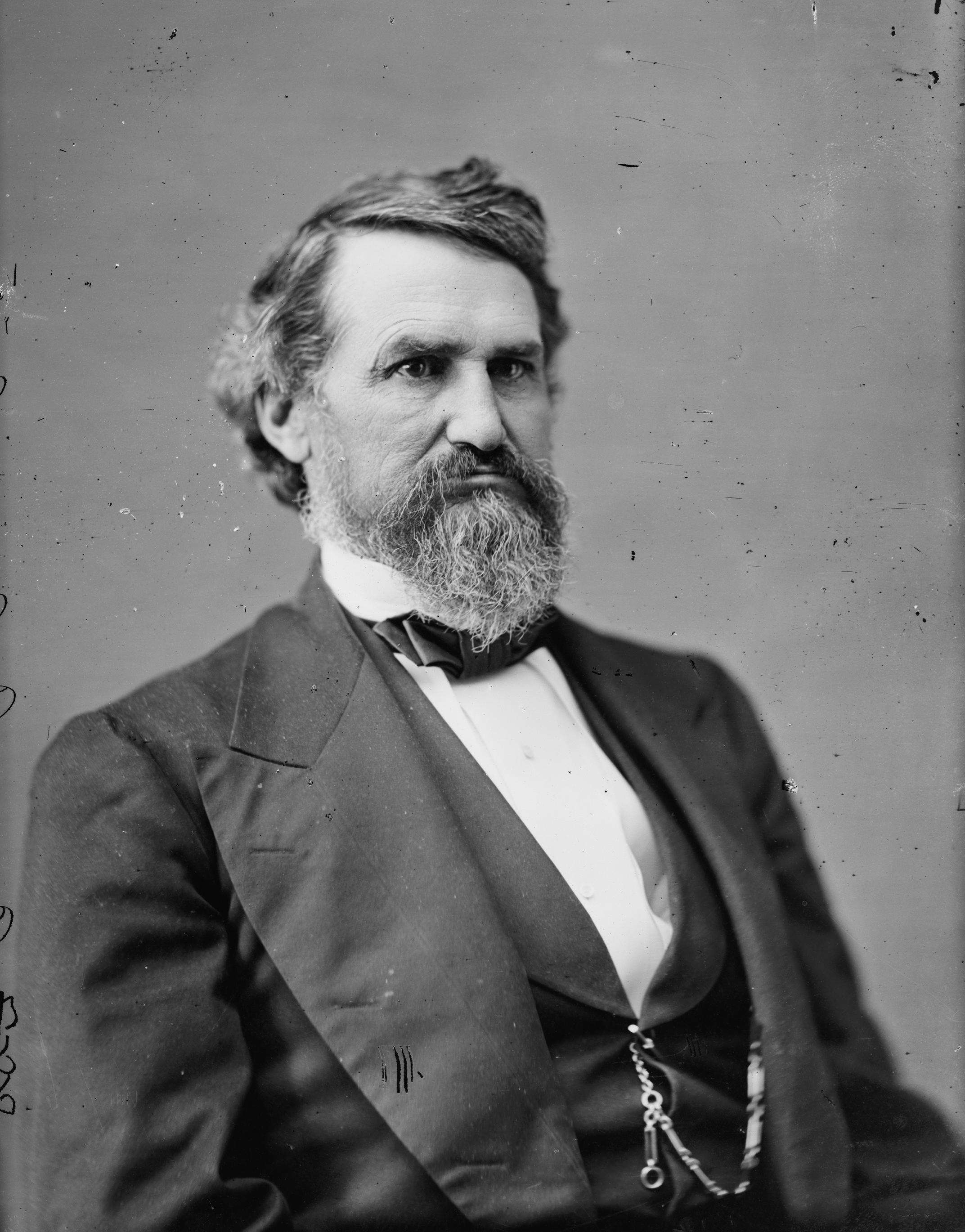

United States Senator from Michigan
- In office March 4, 1881 – March 3, 1887
- Preceded by: Henry P. Baldwin
- Succeeded by: Francis B. Stockbridge

Member of the U.S. House of Representatives from Michigan
- In office March 4, 1869 – March 3, 1881
- Preceded by: Rowland E. Trowbridge (5th); District established (7th)
- Succeeded by: Wilder D. Foster (5th); John T. Rich (7th)
- Constituency: 5th district (1869-73); 7th district (1873-81)

Member of the Michigan Senate
- In office 1855–1859

Personal details
- Born: April 1, 1818 Cooperstown, New York
- Died: July 11, 1898 (aged 80) Ocean City, Maryland
- Party: Republican
- Education: Case Western Reserve University
- Profession: Lawyer

Omar Dwight Conger (April 1, 1818 – July 11, 1898) was a U.S. representative and U.S. senator from the state of Michigan.

Conger was born in Cooperstown, New York, son of the Rev. Enoch Conger and Esther (West) Conger. The Conger family moved to Huron County, Ohio, in 1824. He pursued academic studies at the Huron Institute in Milan, Ohio, and graduated from Western Reserve College (now Case Western Reserve University) in Hudson, Ohio, in 1841. He engaged in mineral explorations of the Lake Superior copper and iron regions in connection with the Michigan State Geological Survey 1845–1847. He engaged in the practice of law in Port Huron, Michigan, in 1848 and was elected judge of the St. Clair County Court in 1850. He was a member of the Michigan State Senate 1855–1859, and served as President pro tempore in 1859. He was a member of the State military board during the Civil War, holding the rank of colonel. He was a Presidential Elector for Michigan in 1864 and a member of the State constitutional convention in 1867.

He was elected as a Republican to the United States House of Representatives for the 41st United States Congress and to the five succeeding Congresses, serving from March 4, 1869 until March 3, 1881. He represented Michigan's 5th congressional district from 1869 to 1873 and became the first person to represent the 7th district from 1873 to 1881.

Conger was re-elected to the House for the 47th Congress in the general election on November 2, 1880. He was subsequently elected by the Michigan Legislature to the United States Senate on January 18, 1881. Conger served the remainder of his term in the House for 46th Congress and resigned from the House for the next term to serve in the Senate. John T. Rich was elected in a special election April 4, 1881, to fill the vacancy in the House.

While in the House, Conger served as chairman, Committee on Expenditures in the State Department in the 42nd Congress, and the Committee on Patents in the 43rd Congress.

Conger was elected in 1880 as a Republican to the United States Senate and served from March 4, 1881, to March 4, 1887. He was an unsuccessful candidate for renomination in 1886. He served as chairman, Committee on Manufactures in the 47th Congress, the Committee on the Revision of the Laws in the 48th Congress, and the Committee on Post Office and Post Roads in the 49th Congress.

After leaving Congress, he engaged in the practice of law in Washington, D.C., and died in Ocean City, Maryland. He is interred in Lakeside Cemetery, Port Huron, Michigan.

Conger also played an important role in the establishment of the American Red Cross. On May 12, 1881, Clara Barton, who became the first president of the organization, organized a meeting at Sen. Conger's home. The 15 people present at this meeting include Barton, Conger, and Rep. William Lawrence (R, OH).

Senator Conger is the namesake for Fort Conger, the pioneering Arctic outpost established by Augustus Greeley's 1881 expedition and named by the explorer, along with Conger Sound, in gratitude for the senator's support.

Conger's legacy can also be seen in the street names in Port Huron, Michigan. The two streets closest to the lake are named Omar Street and Conger Avenue, and are just a few blocks away from Lakeside Cemetery where he is interred. Additionally, there was a short-lived settlement established in the Thumb called "Omard", which was named in honor of the senator using his first name "Omar" and his middle initial "D".

The Library of Congress lists a single published work by Conger in its catalog. This is the 15 page pamphlet titled A Plain Review, published in Washington, D.C., in 1892. Its subject is French spoliation claims. The call number there is E321 .C74.

His grandson was also named Omar Dwight Conger and graduated from Harvard University before being killed in San Diego during World War II.

== Bibliography ==
- Rubenstein, Bruce A. 'Omar D. Conger: Michigan's Forgotten Favorite Son.' Michigan History 66 (September/October 1982): 32–39.

U.S. House of Representatives
Preceded by Rowland E. Trowbridge	United States Representative for the 5th congressional district of Michigan; 1869–1873	Succeeded by Wilder D. Foster
Preceded by None	United States Representative for the 7th congressional district of Michigan; 1873–1881	Succeeded by John T. Rich
U.S. Senate
Preceded by Henry P. Baldwin	U.S. senator (Class 1) from Michigan; 1881–1887; Served alongside: Thomas W. Ferry, Thomas W. Palmer	Succeeded by Francis B. Stockbridge
