= Henry Linderman =

American physician (1825–1879)

Henry Richard Linderman
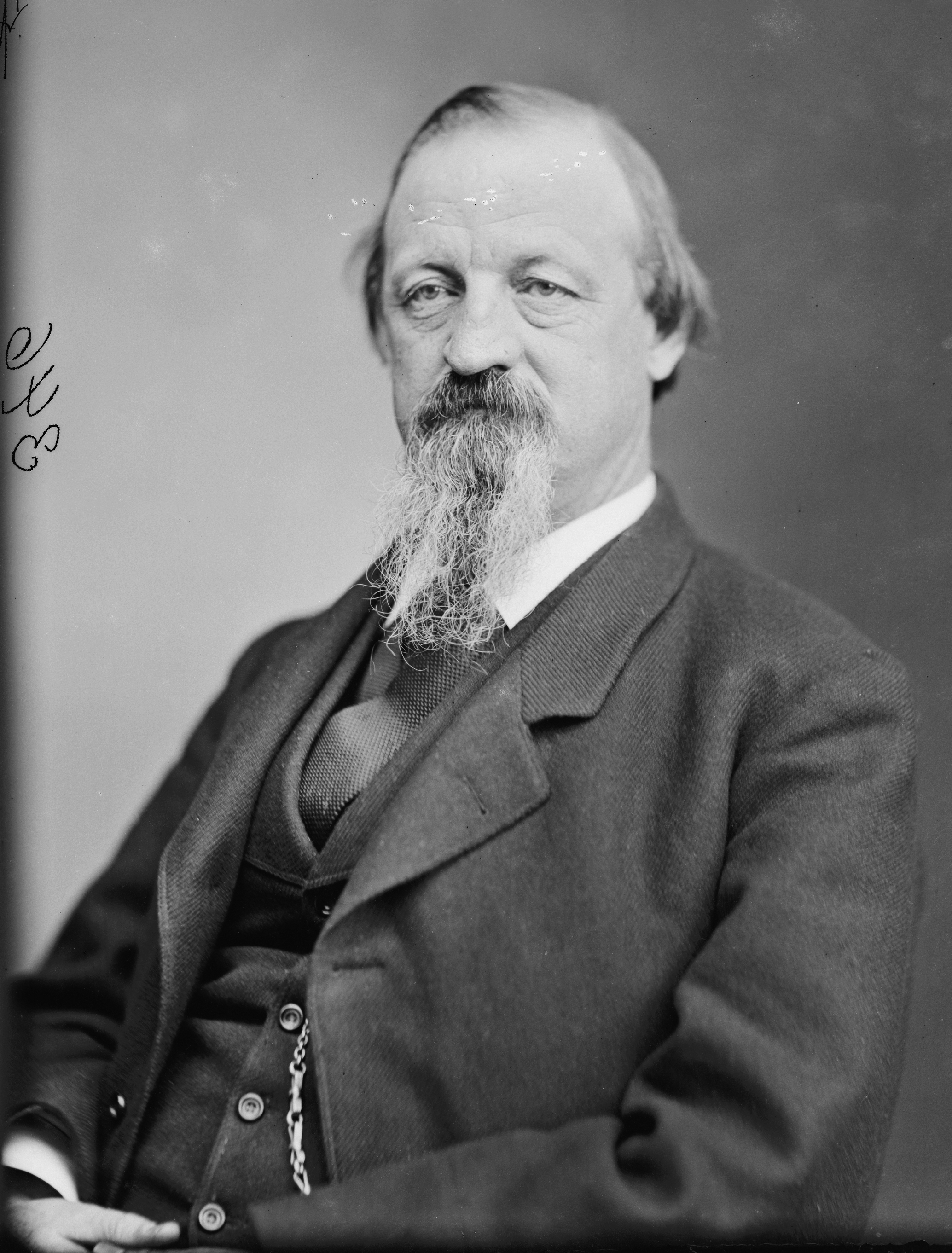
- c. 1865–1880 (from the Brady-Handy Photograph Collection, Prints and Photographs Division, Library of Congress, Washington, D.C.)

12th Director of the United States Mint
- In office April 1867 – May 1869
- President: Andrew Johnson; Ulysses S. Grant
- Preceded by: William Millward
- Succeeded by: James Pollock

14th Director of the United States Mint
- In office April 1873 – December 1878
- President: Ulysses S. Grant; Rutherford B. Hayes
- Preceded by: James Pollock
- Succeeded by: Horatio C. Burchard

Personal details
- Born: December 25, 1825 Lehman, Pennsylvania, U.S.
- Died: January 27, 1879 (aged 53) Washington, D.C., U.S.
- Resting place: Nisky Hill Cemetery, Bethlehem, Pennsylvania
- Party: Democratic
- Spouse: Emily Holland Davis
- Children: Henry Richard Linderman
- Parent(s): Rachel Linderman née Brodhead; John Jordan Linderman
- Education: Doctor of Medicine, 1846
- Alma mater: University of the City of New York

Henry Richard Linderman (December 25, 1825 – January 27, 1879) was an American financier and superintendent of the US Mint.

== Biography ==
=== Ancestry ===
The Brodheads first arrived in America when Daniel Brodhead, a Captain of King Charles II's Grenadiers in the British Army, was dispatched as a part of Nicolls's Expedition to take New Amsterdam in 1664. Brodhead commanded a company that occupied a post in Esopus, New York, where he died two years later. Henry's great-granduncle was Brevet Brigadier General Daniel Brodhead, who served as colonel of the 8th Pennsylvania Regiment in the American Revolution. Henry was the nephew of U.S. Senator Richard Brodhead (his mother's brother).

The Linderman side of the family came to America in the eighteenth century. Jacob von Linderman was a younger son of a line physicians and lawyers from Saxony who occasionally served as counselors to the Electors of Saxony. He emigrated during the chaos of the War of the Austrian Succession and settled near Kingston, New York in 1750.

=== Medical practice ===
Linderman was born in Lehman, Pennsylvania on December 25, 1825. He studied medicine, first under his father, then completing a Doctor of Medicine from University of the City of New York in 1846. While in New York his preceptor was Dr. Willard Parker. Subsequently, he practiced medicine in Pike County, and elsewhere in Pennsylvania, until 1853 when he moved to Philadelphia where he also practiced medicine for a short time.

=== Early career with the mint ===
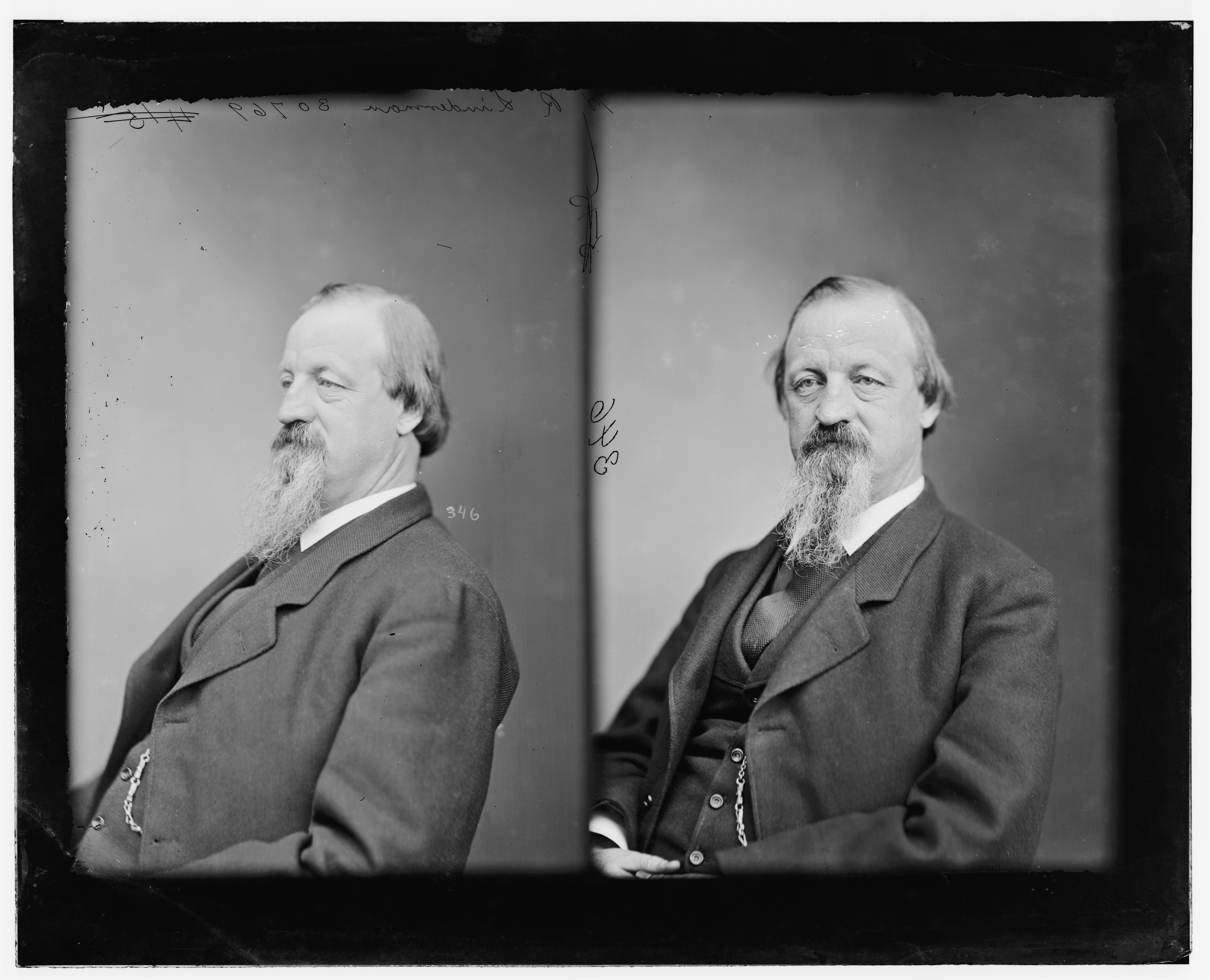
Henry Richard Linderman, c. 1865–1880 (from the Brady-Handy Photograph Collection, Prints and Photographs Division, Library of Congress, Washington, D.C.)

Linderman was active in politics as a Democrat. From 1853 until 1864, he was Chief Clerk (also called Director's Clerk) of the U.S. Mint in Philadelphia. Linderman resigned this office during 1864, and entered business as a stockbroker.

He was director of the mint from 1866 to 1869. On account of his great experience and thorough knowledge of such subjects, Linderman was appointed by the secretary of the treasury to examine the mint in San Francisco, and to adjust some intricate bullion questions. In 1871, he was sent by the U.S. government to London, Paris, and Berlin to collect information concerning the mints in those places, and in 1872 made an elaborate report on the condition of the market for silver. In order to find an outlet for the great amount of silver in the United States, Linderman proposed the trade dollar.

=== Superintendent of the mint ===
With Knox, Linderman drew up the Coinage Act of 1873. On the enactment of this law in April 1873, he was appointed superintendent of the mint and organized the bureau, and from that time had the general supervision of all the mints and assay offices in the United States. During Linderman's administration, he gathered a choice collection of specimen coins, which were to be sold by auction in New York in 1887, but the U.S. government claimed them. As superintendent of the Mint, he wrote annual reports, of which that of 1877, arguing for the gold standard, is best known and most important. He also published Money and Legal Tender in the United States (New York, 1877).

Henry Linderman died on January 27, 1879, in Washington, D.C.

== Notes ==
Government offices
Preceded by William Millward	Director of the United States Mint; April 1867 – May 1869	Succeeded by James Pollock
Preceded by James Pollock	Director of the United States Mint; April 1873 – December 1878	Succeeded by Horatio C. Burchard
