= Horatio C. Burchard =

American politician (1825–1908)

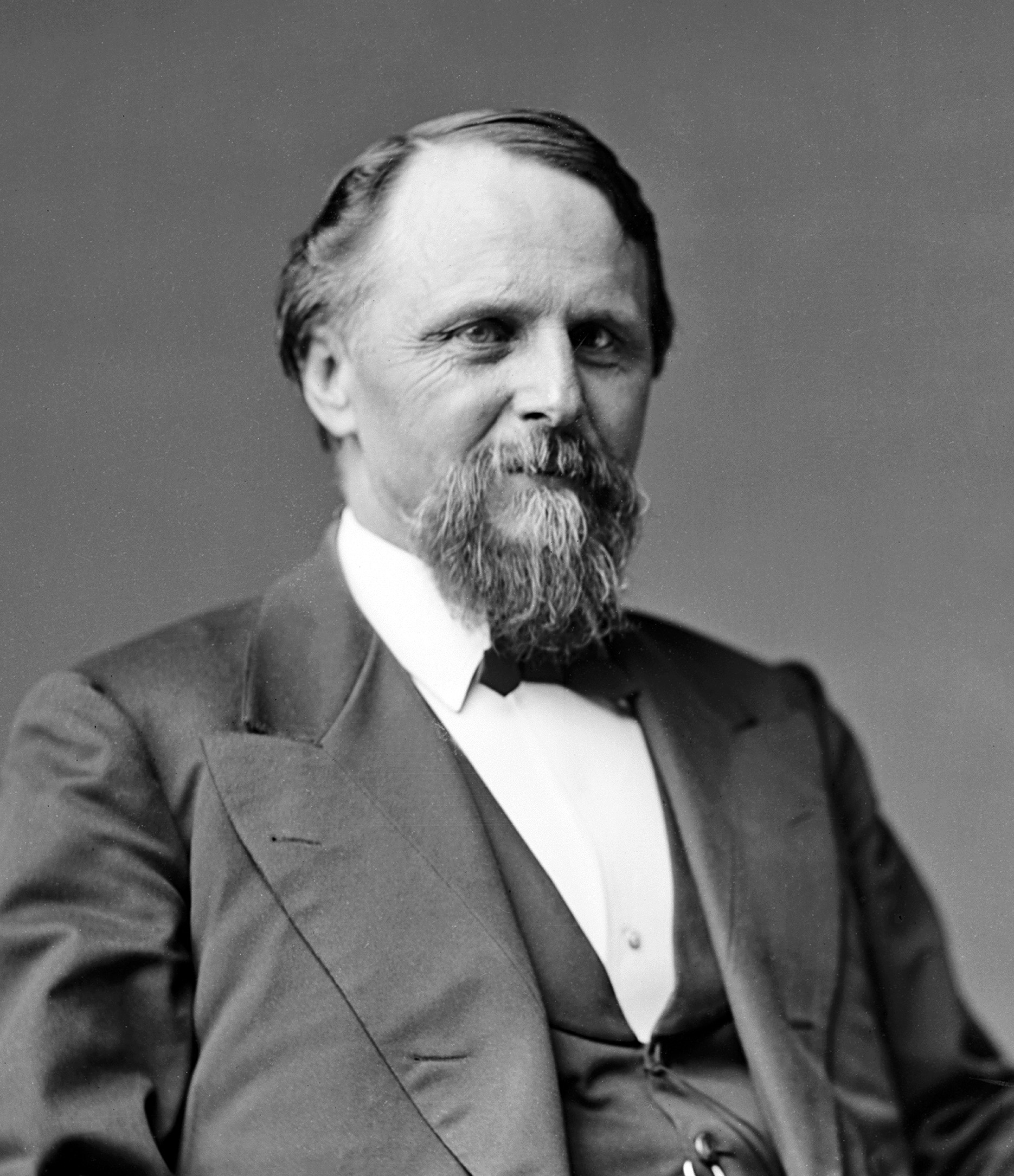

15th Director of the United States Mint
- In office February 1879 – June 1885
- President: Rutherford B. Hayes; James A. Garfield; Chester A. Arthur; Grover Cleveland
- Preceded by: Henry Linderman
- Succeeded by: James P. Kimball

Member of the U.S. House of Representatives from Illinois
- In office December 6, 1869 – March 3, 1879
- Preceded by: Elihu B. Washburne (3rd); Bradford N. Stevens (5th)
- Succeeded by: Charles B. Farwell (3rd); Robert M. A. Hawk (5th)
- Constituency: 3rd district (1869-73); 5th district (1873-79)

Member of the Illinois House of Representatives
- In office 1863-1866

Personal details
- Born: September 22, 1825 Marshall, New York, U.S.
- Died: May 14, 1908 (aged 82) Freeport, Illinois, U.S.
- Party: Republican
- Spouse: Jane Lawver (m. 1861; died 1892)

Horatio Chapin Burchard (September 22, 1825 – May 14, 1908) was a U.S. representative from Illinois, 15th director of the United States Mint, member of the International Statistical Institute, and father of the Consumer Price Index (CPI).

== Biography ==
Born in Marshall, New York, Burchard attended the public schools and private preparatory schools. He was graduated from Hamilton College, Clinton, New York, in 1850. He was a member of the Chi Psi fraternity at Hamilton. He studied law. He was admitted to the bar in 1854 and commenced practice in Freeport, Illinois.

He married Jane Lawver on May 15, 1861, and they had one son.

He served as member of the Illinois House of Representatives 1863-1866. Burchard was elected as a Republican to the Forty-first Congress to fill the vacancy caused by the resignation of Elihu B. Washburne. He was reelected to the Forty-second and to the three succeeding Congresses and served from December 6, 1869 to March 3, 1879. During his time in the U.S. House of Representatives, he was appointed a member of the powerful Ways and Means Committee where he was made Chairman of the Subcommittee on Internal Revenue. Under his Chairmanship of the Subcommittee on Internal Revenue, the first legislation proposing a peacetime income tax was sponsored and debated. However, no income tax legislation was successful passed during his Chairmanship. He was an unsuccessful candidate for renomination in 1878.

He served as director of the United States Mint 1879-1885. During his tenure as the director of the U.S. Mint, he created the Consumer Price Index (CPI), a measurement tool that has become ubiquitous in business and economics. He resumed the practice of law in Freeport. He served as member of the commission to revise the State revenue laws in 1885 and 1886. He was placed in charge of the jury of awards of the mining department of the World's Columbian Exposition at Chicago in 1893.

Burchard's wife Jane died on November 17, 1892. He died in Freeport on May 14, 1908, and was interred in Oakland Cemetery.

U.S. House of Representatives
| Preceded by Elihu B. Washburne | Member of the U.S. House of Representatives from Illinois's 3rd congressional district 1869-1873 | Succeeded by Charles B. Farwell |
| Preceded by Bradford N. Stevens | Member of the U.S. House of Representatives from Illinois's 5th congressional district 1873-1879 | Succeeded by Robert M.A. Hawk |
Government offices
| Preceded by Henry Linderman | Director of the United States Mint; February 1879 – June 1885 | Succeeded by James P. Kimball |
