= List of United States representatives in the 44th Congress =

This is a complete list of United States representatives during the 44th United States Congress listed by seniority.

As an historical article, the districts and party affiliations listed reflect those during the 44th Congress (March 4, 1875 – March 3, 1877). Seats and party affiliations on similar lists for other congresses will be different for certain members.

Seniority depends on the date on which members were sworn into office. Since many members are sworn in on the same day, subsequent ranking is based on previous congressional service of the individual and then by alphabetical order by the last name of the representative.

Committee chairmanship in the House is often associated with seniority. However, party leadership is typically not associated with seniority.

Note: The "*" indicates that the representative/delegate may have served one or more non-consecutive terms while in the House of Representatives of the United States Congress.

== U.S. House seniority list ==
U.S. House seniority
Rank	Representative	Party	District	Seniority date (Previous service, if any)	No.# of term(s)	Notes
1	William D. Kelley	R	PA-04	March 4, 1861	8th term	Dean of the House
2	James G. Blaine	R	ME-03	March 4, 1863	7th term	Resigned on July 10, 1876.
3	James A. Garfield	R	OH-19	March 4, 1863	7th term	
4	Samuel J. Randall	D	PA-03	March 4, 1863	7th term	Speaker of the House
5	William Henry Barnum	D	CT-04	March 4, 1867	5th term	Resigned on May 18, 1876.
6	William S. Holman	D	IN-05	March 4, 1867; Previous service, 1859–1865.	8th term*	Left the House in 1877.
7	Henry H. Starkweather	R	CT-03	March 4, 1867	5th term	Died on January 28, 1876.
8	Fernando Wood	D	NY-09	March 4, 1867; Previous service, 1841–1843 and 1863–1865.	7th term**	
9	James Buffington	R	MA-01	March 4, 1869; Previous service, 1855–1863.	8th term*	Died on March 7, 1875.
10	Omar D. Conger	R	MI-07	March 4, 1869	4th term	
11	Chester Bidwell Darrall	R	LA-03	March 4, 1869	4th term	
12	Eugene Hale	R	ME-05	March 4, 1869	4th term	
13	Charles Hays	R	AL-04	March 4, 1869	4th term	Left the House in 1877.
14	George Frisbie Hoar	R	MA-09	March 4, 1869	4th term	Left the House in 1877.
15	George W. McCrary	R	IA-01	March 4, 1869	4th term	Left the House in 1877.
16	Frank Morey	R	LA-05	March 4, 1869	4th term	Resigned on June 8, 1876.
17	John B. Packer	R	PA-14	March 4, 1869	4th term	Left the House in 1877.
18	Thomas Swann	D	MD-04	March 4, 1869	4th term	
19	Washington Townsend	R	PA-06	March 4, 1869	4th term	Left the House in 1877.
20	Erastus Wells	D	MO-02	March 4, 1869	4th term	Left the House in 1877.
21	William A. Wheeler	R	NY-19	March 4, 1869; Previous service, 1861–1863.	5th term*	Left the House in 1877.
22	Horatio C. Burchard	R	IL-05	December 6, 1869	4th term	
23	Alexander S. Wallace	R	SC-04	May 27, 1870	4th term	Left the House in 1877.
24	Joseph Rainey	R	SC-01	December 12, 1870	4th term	
25	John M. Bright	D	TN-05	March 4, 1871	3rd term	
26	Mark H. Dunnell	R	MN-01	March 4, 1871	3rd term	
27	Benjamin T. Eames	R	RI-01	March 4, 1871	3rd term	
28	Charles B. Farwell	R	IL-03	March 4, 1871	3rd term	Resigned on May 6, 1876.
29	Charles Foster	R	OH-10	March 4, 1871	3rd term	
30	William P. Frye	R	ME-02	March 4, 1871	3rd term	
31	John Hancock	D	TX-05	March 4, 1871	3rd term	Left the House in 1877.
32	John T. Harris	D	VA-07	March 4, 1871; Previous service, 1859–1861.	4th term*	
33	Frank Hereford	D	WV-03	March 4, 1871	3rd term	Resigned on January 31, 1877.
34	James Monroe	R	OH-18	March 4, 1871	3rd term	
35	Jeremiah McLain Rusk	R	WI-07	March 4, 1871	3rd term	Left the House in 1877.
36	William Henry Harrison Stowell	R	VA-04	March 4, 1871	3rd term	Left the House in 1877.
37	Alfred Moore Waddell	D	NC-03	March 4, 1871	3rd term	
38	Henry Waldron	R	MI-02	March 4, 1871; Previous service, 1855–1861.	6th term*	Left the House in 1877.
39	Washington C. Whitthorne	D	TN-07	March 4, 1871	3rd term	
40	Thomas Samuel Ashe	D	NC-06	March 4, 1873	2nd term	Left the House in 1877.
41	John DeWitt Clinton Atkins	D	TN-08	March 4, 1873; Previous service, 1857–1859.	3rd term*	
42	Henry B. Banning	D	OH-02	March 4, 1873	2nd term	
43	Lyman K. Bass	R	NY-32	March 4, 1873	2nd term	Left the House in 1877.
44	Richard P. Bland	D	MO-05	March 4, 1873	2nd term	
45	James Henderson Blount	D	GA-06	March 4, 1873	2nd term	
46	Nathan B. Bradley	R	MI-08	March 4, 1873	2nd term	Left the House in 1877.
47	John Y. Brown	D	KY-02	March 4, 1873; Previous service, 1860–1861.	3rd term*	Left the House in 1877.
48	Aylett Hawes Buckner	D	MO-13	March 4, 1873	2nd term	
49	John H. Burleigh	R	ME-01	March 4, 1873	2nd term	Left the House in 1877.
50	John Henry Caldwell	D	AL-05	March 4, 1873	2nd term	Left the House in 1877.
51	Joseph Gurney Cannon	R	IL-14	March 4, 1873	2nd term	
52	Thomas J. Cason	R	IN-09	March 4, 1873	2nd term	Left the House in 1877.
53	John Bullock Clark, Jr.	D	MO-11	March 4, 1873	2nd term	
54	Hiester Clymer	D	PA-08	March 4, 1873	2nd term	
55	Philip Cook	D	GA-03	March 4, 1873	2nd term	
56	Lorenzo Crounse	R	NE	March 4, 1873	2nd term	Left the House in 1877.
57	Lorenzo Danford	R	OH-16	March 4, 1873	2nd term	
58	Samuel A. Dobbins	R	NJ-02	March 4, 1873	2nd term	Left the House in 1877.
59	Milton J. Durham	D	KY-08	March 4, 1873	2nd term	
60	John R. Eden	D	IL-15	March 4, 1873; Previous service, 1863–1865.	3rd term*	
61	Greenbury L. Fort	R	IL-08	March 4, 1873	2nd term	
62	John Montgomery Glover	D	MO-12	March 4, 1873	2nd term	
63	Robert Hamilton	D	NJ-04	March 4, 1873	2nd term	Left the House in 1877.
64	Benjamin W. Harris	R	MA-02	March 4, 1873	2nd term	
65	Henry R. Harris	D	GA-04	March 4, 1873	2nd term	
66	Robert Anthony Hatcher	D	MO-04	March 4, 1873	2nd term	
67	Henry H. Hathorn	R	NY-20	March 4, 1873	2nd term	Left the House in 1877.
68	George Whitman Hendee	R	VT-03	March 4, 1873	2nd term	
69	George Gilbert Hoskins	R	NY-31	March 4, 1873	2nd term	Left the House in 1877.
70	Jay Abel Hubbell	R	MI-09	March 4, 1873	2nd term	
71	Morton C. Hunter	R	IN-08	March 4, 1873; Previous service, 1867–1869.	3rd term*	
72	Eppa Hunton	D	VA-08	March 4, 1873	2nd term	
73	Stephen A. Hurlbut	R	IL-04	March 4, 1873	2nd term	Left the House in 1877.
74	John A. Kasson	R	IA-07	March 4, 1873; Previous service, 1863–1867.	4th term*	Left the House in 1877.
75	William Lawrence	R	OH-08	March 4, 1873; Previous service, 1865–1871.	5th term*	Left the House in 1877.
76	John R. Lynch	R	MS-06	March 4, 1873	2nd term	Left the House in 1877.
77	Lucius Quintus Cincinnatus Lamar II	D	MS-01	March 4, 1873; Previous service, 1857–1860.	4th term*	Left the House in 1877.
78	John K. Luttrell	D	CA-03	March 4, 1873	2nd term	
79	Clinton D. MacDougall	R	NY-26	March 4, 1873	2nd term	Left the House in 1877.
80	James W. McDill	R	IA-08	March 4, 1873	2nd term	Left the House in 1877.
81	Charles W. Milliken	D	KY-03	March 4, 1873	2nd term	Left the House in 1877.
82	Roger Q. Mills	D	TX-04	March 4, 1873	2nd term	
83	William Ralls Morrison	D	IL-17	March 4, 1873; Previous service, 1863–1865.	3rd term*	
84	Lawrence T. Neal	D	OH-07	March 4, 1873	2nd term	Left the House in 1877.
85	William J. O'Brien	D	MD-03	March 4, 1873	2nd term	Left the House in 1877.
86	Charles O'Neill	R	PA-02	March 4, 1873; Previous service, 1863–1871.	6th term*	
87	Horace F. Page	R	CA-02	March 4, 1873	2nd term	
88	William A. Phillips	R	KS-01	March 4, 1873	2nd term	
89	Thomas C. Platt	R	NY-28	March 4, 1873	2nd term	Left the House in 1877.
90	Henry O. Pratt	R	IA-04	March 4, 1873	2nd term	Left the House in 1877.
91	William M. Robbins	D	NC-07	March 4, 1873	2nd term	
92	Sobieski Ross	R	PA-16	March 4, 1873	2nd term	Left the House in 1877.
93	Milton Sayler	D	OH-01	March 4, 1873	2nd term	
94	John G. Schumaker	D	NY-02	March 4, 1873; Previous service, 1869–1871.	3rd term*	Left the House in 1877.
95	Abraham Herr Smith	R	PA-09	March 4, 1873	2nd term	
96	Milton I. Southard	D	OH-13	March 4, 1873	2nd term	
97	Horace B. Strait	R	MN-02	March 4, 1873	2nd term	
98	William H. Stone	D	MO-03	March 4, 1873	2nd term	Left the House in 1877.
99	Jacob Montgomery Thornburgh	R	TN-02	March 4, 1873	2nd term	
100	Robert B. Vance	D	NC-08	March 4, 1873	2nd term	
101	Josiah T. Walls	R	FL-02	March 4, 1873; Previous service, 1871–1873.	3rd term*	Resigned on April 19, 1876.
102	John O. Whitehouse	D	NY-13	March 4, 1873	2nd term	Left the House in 1877.
103	George Willard	R	MI-03	March 4, 1873	2nd term	Left the House in 1877.
104	Charles G. Williams	R	WI-01	March 4, 1873	2nd term	
105	James Wilson	R	IA-05	March 4, 1873	2nd term	Left the House in 1877.
106	Laurin D. Woodworth	R	OH-17	March 4, 1873	2nd term	Left the House in 1877.
107	Samuel S. Cox	D	NY-06	November 4, 1873; Previous service, 1857–1865 and 1869–1873.	8th term**	
108	Henry L. Pierce	R	MA-03	December 1, 1873	2nd term	Left the House in 1877.
109	Alexander H. Stephens	D	GA-08	December 1, 1873; Previous service, 1843–1859.	10th term*	
110	William B. Williams	R	MI-05	December 1, 1873	2nd term	Left the House in 1877.
111	Thomas M. Gunter	D	AR-04	June 16, 1874	2nd term	
112	Simeon B. Chittenden	R	NY-03	November 3, 1874	2nd term	
113	Bernard G. Caulfield	D	IL-01	February 1, 1875	2nd term	Left the House in 1877.
114	Lucien L. Ainsworth	D	IA-03	March 4, 1875	1st term	Left the House in 1877.
115	Charles H. Adams	R	NY-16	March 4, 1875	1st term	Left the House in 1877.
116	William B. Anderson	R	IL-19	March 4, 1875	1st term	Left the House in 1877.
117	John C. Bagby	D	IL-10	March 4, 1875	1st term	Left the House in 1877.
118	George A. Bagley	R	NY-22	March 4, 1875	1st term	
119	John H. Bagley, Jr.	D	NY-15	March 4, 1875	1st term	Left the House in 1877.
120	John Baker	R	IN-13	March 4, 1875	1st term	
121	William H. Baker	R	NY-24	March 4, 1875	1st term	
122	Latimer Whipple Ballou	R	RI-02	March 4, 1875	1st term	
123	Nathaniel P. Banks	R	MA-05	March 4, 1875; Previous service, 1853–1857 and 1865–1873.	8th term**	
124	George M. Beebe	D	NY-14	March 4, 1875	1st term	
125	Samuel Newell Bell	D	NH-02	March 4, 1875; Previous service, 1871–1873.	2nd term*	Left the House in 1877.
126	Joseph Clay Stiles Blackburn	D	KY-07	March 4, 1875	1st term	
127	Henry W. Blair	R	NH-03	March 4, 1875	1st term	
128	Archibald M. Bliss	D	NY-04	March 4, 1875	1st term	
129	Andrew Boone	D	KY-01	March 4, 1875	1st term	
130	Taul Bradford	D	AL-03	March 4, 1875	1st term	Left the House in 1877.
131	William R. Brown	R	KS-03	March 4, 1875	1st term	Left the House in 1877.
132	Samuel D. Burchard	D	WI-05	March 4, 1875	1st term	Left the House in 1877.
133	George Cabell	D	VA-05	March 4, 1875	1st term	
134	William Parker Caldwell	D	TN-09	March 4, 1875	1st term	
135	Alexander Campbell	R	IL-07	March 4, 1875	1st term	Left the House in 1877.
136	Milton A. Candler	D	GA-05	March 4, 1875	1st term	
137	Lucien B. Caswell	R	WI-02	March 4, 1875	1st term	
138	George W. Cate	D	WI-08	March 4, 1875	1st term	Left the House in 1877.
139	Chester W. Chapin	D	MA-11	March 4, 1875	1st term	Left the House in 1877.
140	John Blades Clarke	D	KY-10	March 4, 1875	1st term	
141	Alexander Gilmore Cochran	D	PA-23	March 4, 1875	1st term	Left the House in 1877.
142	Francis Dolan Collins	D	PA-11	March 4, 1875	1st term	
143	Jacob Pitzer Cowan	D	OH-14	March 4, 1875	1st term	Left the House in 1877.
144	David B. Culberson	D	TX-02	March 4, 1875	1st term	
145	Augustus W. Cutler	D	NJ-05	March 4, 1875	1st term	
146	Joseph J. Davis	D	NC-04	March 4, 1875	1st term	
147	John M. Davy	R	NY-30	March 4, 1875	1st term	Left the House in 1877.
148	Rezin A. De Bolt	D	MO-10	March 4, 1875	1st term	Left the House in 1877.
149	Dudley Chase Denison	R	VT-02	March 4, 1875	1st term	
150	George Gibbs Dibrell	D	TN-03	March 4, 1875	1st term	
151	Beverly B. Douglas	D	VA-01	March 4, 1875	1st term	
152	George H. Durand	D	MI-06	March 4, 1875	1st term	Left the House in 1877.
153	Albert Gallatin Egbert	D	PA-27	March 4, 1875	1st term	Left the House in 1877.
154	E. John Ellis	D	LA-02	March 4, 1875	1st term	
155	Smith Ely, Jr.	D	NY-07	March 4, 1875; Previous service, 1871–1873.	2nd term*	Resigned on December 11, 1876.
156	James La Fayette Evans	R	IN-11	March 4, 1875	1st term	
157	Charles J. Faulkner	D	WV-02	March 4, 1875; Previous service, 1851–1859.	5th term*	Left the House in 1877.
158	William Harrell Felton	D	GA-07	March 4, 1875	1st term	
159	Samuel McClary Fite	D	TN-04	March 4, 1875	1st term	Died on October 23, 1875.
160	Benjamin Joseph Franklin	D	MO-08	March 4, 1875	1st term	
161	Chapman Freeman	R	PA-01	March 4, 1875	1st term	
162	Rufus S. Frost	R	MA-04	March 4, 1875	1st term	Resigned on July 28, 1876.
163	William H. Forney	D	AL	March 4, 1875	1st term	
164	Benoni S. Fuller	D	IN-01	March 4, 1875	1st term	
165	Lucien C. Gause	D	AR-01	March 4, 1875	1st term	
166	Randall L. Gibson	D	LA-01	March 4, 1875	1st term	
167	John Goode	D	VA-02	March 4, 1875	1st term	
168	John R. Goodin	D	KS-02	March 4, 1875	1st term	Left the House in 1877.
169	Andrew H. Hamilton	D	IN-12	March 4, 1875	1st term	
170	Jeremiah Haralson	R	AL-01	March 4, 1875	1st term	Left the House in 1877.
171	Augustus A. Hardenbergh	D	NJ-07	March 4, 1875	1st term	
172	Julian Hartridge	D	GA-01	March 4, 1875	1st term	
173	Carter Harrison, Sr.	D	IL-02	March 4, 1875	1st term	
174	William Hartzell	D	IL-18	March 4, 1875	1st term	
175	William S. Haymond	D	IN-10	March 4, 1875	1st term	Left the House in 1877.
176	Thomas J. Henderson	R	IL-06	March 4, 1875	1st term	
177	Eli Jones Henkle	D	MD-05	March 4, 1875	1st term	
178	Abram Hewitt	D	NY-10	March 4, 1875	1st term	
179	Goldsmith W. Hewitt	D	AL-06	March 4, 1875	1st term	
180	Solomon L. Hoge	R	SC-03	March 4, 1875; Previous service, 1869–1871.	2nd term*	Left the House in 1877.
181	Charles E. Hooker	D	MS-05	March 4, 1875	1st term	
182	James H. Hopkins	D	PA-22	March 4, 1875	1st term	Left the House in 1877.
183	John Ford House	D	TN-06	March 4, 1875	1st term	
184	Frank H. Hurd	D	OH-06	March 4, 1875	1st term	Left the House in 1877.
185	John Adams Hyman	R	NC-02	March 4, 1875	1st term	Left the House in 1877.
186	George A. Jenks	D	PA-25	March 4, 1875	1st term	Left the House in 1877.
187	Frank Jones	D	NH-01	March 4, 1875	1st term	
188	Thomas L. Jones	D	KY-06	March 4, 1875; Previous service, 1867–1871.	3rd term*	Left the House in 1877.
189	Charles Herbert Joyce	R	VT-01	March 4, 1875	1st term	
190	Edward C. Kehr	D	MO-01	March 4, 1875	1st term	Left the House in 1877.
191	Michael C. Kerr	D	IN-03	March 4, 1875; Previous service, 1865–1873.	5th term*	Speaker of the House; Died on August 19, 1876.
192	Winthrop Welles Ketcham	R	PA-12	March 4, 1875	1st term	Resigned on July 19, 1876.
193	Alanson M. Kimball	R	WI-06	March 4, 1875	1st term	Left the House in 1877.
194	William S. King	R	MN-03	March 4, 1875	1st term	Left the House in 1877.
195	J. Proctor Knott	D	KY-04	March 4, 1875; Previous service, 1867–1871.	3rd term*	
196	Franklin Landers	D	IN-07	March 4, 1875	1st term	Left the House in 1877.
197	George M. Landers	D	CT-01	March 4, 1875	1st term	
198	Elbridge G. Lapham	R	NY-27	March 4, 1875	1st term	
199	George Augustus La Dow	D	OR	March 4, 1875	1st term	Died on May 1, 1875.
200	Elias W. Leavenworth	R	NY-25	March 4, 1875	1st term	Left the House in 1877.
201	William M. Levy	D	LA-04	March 4, 1875	1st term	Left the House in 1877.
202	Burwell Boykin Lewis	D	AL	March 4, 1875	1st term	Left the House in 1877.
203	Scott Lord	D	NY-23	March 4, 1875	1st term	Left the House in 1877.
204	William P. Lynde	D	WI-04	March 4, 1875; Previous service, 1848–1849.	2nd term*	
205	Edmund William McGregor Mackey	R	SC-02	March 4, 1875	1st term	Resigned on July 19, 1876.
206	Levi A. Mackey	D	PA-20	March 4, 1875	1st term	
207	Levi Maish	D	PA-19	March 4, 1875	1st term	
208	Henry S. Magoon	R	WI-03	March 4, 1875	1st term	Left the House in 1877.
209	William McFarland	D	TN-01	March 4, 1875	1st term	Left the House in 1877.
210	John A. McMahon	D	OH-04	March 4, 1875	1st term	
211	Edwin R. Meade	D	NY-05	March 4, 1875	1st term	Left the House in 1877.
212	Henry B. Metcalfe	D	NY-01	March 4, 1875	1st term	Left the House in 1877.
213	Samuel F. Miller	R	NY-21	March 4, 1875; Previous service, 1863–1865.	2nd term*	Left the House in 1877.
214	Hernando Money	D	MS-03	March 4, 1875	1st term	
215	Charles Henry Morgan	D	MO-06	March 4, 1875	1st term	
216	William Mutchler	D	PA-10	March 4, 1875	1st term	Left the House in 1877.
217	Charles E. Nash	R	LA-06	March 4, 1875	1st term	Left the House in 1877.
218	Jeptha D. New	D	IN-04	March 4, 1875	1st term	Left the House in 1877.
219	Nathaniel H. Odell	D	NY-12	March 4, 1875	1st term	Left the House in 1877.
220	S. Addison Oliver	R	IA-09	March 4, 1875	1st term	
221	Edward Y. Parsons	D	KY-05	March 4, 1875	1st term	Died on July 8, 1876.
222	Henry B. Payne	D	OH-20	March 4, 1875	1st term	Left the House in 1877.
223	James Phelps	D	CT-02	March 4, 1875	1st term	
224	John Finis Philips	D	MO-07	March 4, 1875	1st term	Left the House in 1877.
225	William Adam Piper	D	CA-01	March 4, 1875	1st term	Left the House in 1877.
226	Earley F. Poppleton	D	OH-09	March 4, 1875	1st term	Left the House in 1877.
227	Allen Potter	D	MI-04	March 4, 1875	1st term	Left the House in 1877.
228	Joseph Powell	D	PA-15	March 4, 1875	1st term	Left the House in 1877.
229	William J. Purman	R	FL-01	March 4, 1875; Previous service, 1873–1875.	2nd term*	Left the House in 1877.
230	David Rea	D	MO-09	March 4, 1875	1st term	
231	John Henninger Reagan	D	TX-01	March 4, 1875; Previous service, 1857–1861.	3rd term*	
232	James Bernard Reilly	D	PA-13	March 4, 1875	1st term	
233	John Reilly	D	PA-17	March 4, 1875	1st term	Left the House in 1877.
234	Americus V. Rice	D	OH-05	March 4, 1875	1st term	
235	John Robbins	D	PA-05	March 4, 1875; Previous service, 1849–1855.	4th term*	Left the House in 1877.
236	Charles Boyle Roberts	D	MD-02	March 4, 1875	1st term	
237	Milton S. Robinson	R	IN-06	March 4, 1875	1st term	
238	Miles Ross	D	NJ-03	March 4, 1875	1st term	
239	Ezekiel S. Sampson	R	IA-06	March 4, 1875	1st term	
240	John S. Savage	D	OH-03	March 4, 1875	1st term	Left the House in 1877.
241	Alfred Moore Scales	D	NC-05	March 4, 1875; Previous service, 1857–1859.	2nd term*	
242	Gustav Schleicher	D	TX-06	March 4, 1875	1st term	
243	Julius Hawley Seelye	I	MA-10	March 4, 1875	1st term	Left the House in 1877.
244	James Sheakley	D	PA-26	March 4, 1875	1st term	Left the House in 1877.
245	Otho R. Singleton	D	MS-04	March 4, 1875; Previous service, 1853–1855 and 1857–1861.	5th term**	
246	Clement Hall Sinnickson	R	NJ-01	March 4, 1875	1st term	
247	William F. Slemons	D	AR-02	March 4, 1875	1st term	
248	Robert Smalls	R	SC-05	March 4, 1875	1st term	
249	William Ephraim Smith	D	GA-02	March 4, 1875	1st term	
250	William A.J. Sparks	D	IL-16	March 4, 1875	1st term	
251	William McKendree Springer	D	IL-12	March 4, 1875	1st term	
252	William Stenger	D	PA-18	March 4, 1875	1st term	
253	Adlai Stevenson I	D	IL-13	March 4, 1875	1st term	Left the House in 1877.
254	John K. Tarbox	D	MA-07	March 4, 1875	1st term	Left the House in 1877.
255	Frederick Halstead Teese	D	NJ-06	March 4, 1875	1st term	Left the House in 1877.
256	William Terry	D	VA-09	March 4, 1875; Previous service, 1871–1873.	2nd term*	Left the House in 1877.
257	Philip Francis Thomas	D	MD-01	March 4, 1875; Previous service, 1839–1841.	2nd term*	Left the House in 1877.
258	Charles Perkins Thompson	D	MA-06	March 4, 1875	1st term	Left the House in 1877.
259	James W. Throckmorton	D	TX-03	March 4, 1875	1st term	
260	Martin I. Townsend	R	NY-17	March 4, 1875	1st term	
261	John R. Tucker	D	VA-06	March 4, 1875	1st term	
262	John Q. Tufts	R	IA-02	March 4, 1875	1st term	Left the House in 1877.
263	Jacob Turney	D	PA-21	March 4, 1875	1st term	
264	Nelson H. Van Vorhes	R	OH-15	March 4, 1875	1st term	
265	Charles C. B. Walker	D	NY-29	March 4, 1875	1st term	Left the House in 1877.
266	John Winfield Wallace	R	PA-24	March 4, 1875; Previous service, 1861–1863.	2nd term*	Left the House in 1877.
267	Ansel T. Walling	D	OH-12	March 4, 1875	1st term	Left the House in 1877.
268	William Walsh	D	MD-06	March 4, 1875	1st term	
269	Gilbert Carlton Walker	D	VA-03	March 4, 1875	1st term	
270	Elijah Ward	D	NY-08	March 4, 1875; Previous service, 1857–1859 and 1861–1865.	4th term**	Left the House in 1877.
271	William W. Warren	D	MA-08	March 4, 1875	1st term	Left the House in 1877.
272	Guilford Wiley Wells	R	MS-02	March 4, 1875	1st term	Left the House in 1877.
273	John D. White	R	KY-09	March 4, 1875	1st term	Left the House in 1877.
274	Richard H. Whiting	R	IL-09	March 4, 1875	1st term	Left the House in 1877.
275	Andrew Williams	R	NY-18	March 4, 1875	1st term	
276	James D. Williams	D	IN-02	March 4, 1875	1st term	Resigned on December 1, 1876.
277	Benjamin A. Willis	D	NY-11	March 4, 1875	1st term	
278	William W. Wilshire	D	AR-03	March 4, 1875; Previous service, 1873–1874.	2nd term*	Left the House in 1877.
279	Peter D. Wigginton	D	CA-04	March 4, 1875	1st term	Left the House in 1877.
280	Scott Wike	D	IL-11	March 4, 1875	1st term	Left the House in 1877.
281	Alpheus S. Williams	D	MI-01	March 4, 1875	1st term	
282	James Williams	D	DE	March 4, 1875	1st term	
283	Jeremiah N. Williams	D	AL-02	March 4, 1875	1st term	
284	Benjamin Wilson	D	WV-01	March 4, 1875	1st term	
285	William Woodburn	R	NV	March 4, 1875	1st term	Left the House in 1877.
286	Alan Wood	R	PA-07	March 4, 1875	1st term	Left the House in 1877.
287	John L. Vance	D	OH-11	March 4, 1875	1st term	Left the House in 1877.
288	Jesse Johnson Yeates	D	NC-01	March 4, 1875	1st term	
289	H. Casey Young	D	TN-10	March 4, 1875	1st term	
	Benjamin Harvey Hill	D	GA-09	May 5, 1875	1st term	Resigned on March 3, 1877.
	Harris M. Plaisted	R	ME-04	September 13, 1875	1st term	Left the House in 1877.
	Lafayette Lane	D	OR	October 25, 1875	1st term	Left the House in 1877.
	William W. Crapo	R	MA-01	November 2, 1875	1st term	
	Nelson I. Norton	R	NY-33	December 6, 1875	1st term	Left the House in 1877.
	Haywood Yancey Riddle	D	TN-04	December 14, 1875	1st term	
	John T. Wait	R	CT-03	April 12, 1876	1st term	
	Jesse J. Finley	D	FL-02	April 19, 1876	1st term	Left the House in 1877.
	John V. Le Moyne	D	IL-03	May 6, 1876	1st term	Left the House in 1877.
	William B. Spencer	D	LA-05	June 8, 1876	1st term	Resigned on January 8, 1877.
	Josiah Gardner Abbott	D	MA-04	July 28, 1876	1st term	Left the House in 1877.
	Henry Watterson	D	KY-05	August 12, 1876	1st term	Left the House in 1877.
	James B. Belford	D	CO	October 3, 1876	1st term	
	Charles W. Buttz	R	SC-02	November 7, 1876	1st term	Left the House in 1877.
	Edwin Flye	R	ME-03	December 4, 1876	1st term	Left the House in 1877.
	Levi Warner	D	CT-04	December 4, 1876	1st term	
	Andrew Humphreys	D	IN-02	December 4, 1876	1st term	Left the House in 1877.
	William H. Stanton	D	PA-12	December 4, 1876	1st term	Left the House in 1877.
	Nathan T. Carr	D	IN-03	December 5, 1876	1st term	Left the House in 1877.
	David Dudley Field II	D	NY-07	January 11, 1877	1st term	Left the House in 1877.

== Delegates ==
Rank	Delegate	Party	District	Seniority date (Previous service, if any)	No.# of term(s)	Notes
1	George Q. Cannon	R	UT	March 4, 1873	2nd term	
2	Stephen Benton Elkins	R	NM	March 4, 1873	2nd term	
3	Martin Maginnis	D	MT	March 4, 1873	2nd term	
4	William Randolph Steele	D	WY	March 4, 1873	2nd term	
5	Thomas W. Bennett	Ind.	ID	March 4, 1875	1st term	
6	Orange Jacobs	R	WA	March 4, 1875	1st term	
7	Jefferson P. Kidder	R	DAK	March 4, 1875	1st term	
8	Thomas M. Patterson	D	CO	March 4, 1875	1st term	
9	Hiram Sanford Stevens	D	AZ	March 4, 1875	1st term	
	Stephen Southmyd Fenn	D	ID	June 23, 1876	1st term	

== See also ==
- 44th United States Congress
- List of United States congressional districts
- List of United States senators in the 44th Congress
