= List of United States senators in the 44th Congress =

This is a complete list of United States senators during the 44th United States Congress listed by seniority from March 4, 1875, to March 3, 1877.

Order of service is based on the commencement of the senator's first term. Behind this is former service as a senator (only giving the senator seniority within their new incoming class), service as vice president, a House member, a cabinet secretary, or a governor of a state. The final factor is the population of the senator's state.

Senators who were sworn in during the middle of the Congress (up until the last senator who was not sworn in early after winning the November 1876 election) are listed at the end of the list with no number.

== Terms of service ==
Class	Terms of service of senators that expired in years
Class 2	Terms of service of senators that expired in 1877 (AL, AR, CO, DE, GA, IA, IL, KS, KY, LA, MA, ME, MI, MN, MS, NC, NE, NH, NJ, OR, RI, SC, TN, TX, VA, and WV.)
Class 3	Terms of service of senators that expired in 1879 (AL, AR, CA, CO, CT, FL, GA, IA, IL, IN, KS, KY, LA, MD, MO, NC, NH, NV, NY, OH, OR, PA, SC, VT, and WI.)
Class 1	Terms of service of senators that expired in 1881 (CA, CT, DE, FL, IN, MA, MD, ME, MI, MN, MO, MS, NE, NJ, NV, NY, OH, PA, RI, TN, TX, VA, VT, WI, and WV.)

== U.S. Senate seniority list ==
U.S. Senate seniority
Rank	Senator (party-state)	Seniority date	Other factors
1	Henry B. Anthony (R-RI)	March 4, 1859	Former governor
2	Timothy O. Howe (R-WI)	March 4, 1861	
3	John Sherman (R-OH)	March 21, 1861	
4	Aaron H. Cragin (R-NH)	March 4, 1865	
5	George F. Edmunds (R-VT)	April 3, 1866	
6	Roscoe Conkling (R-NY)	March 4, 1867	
7	Justin Smith Morrill (R-VT)	March 4, 1867	
8	Oliver P. Morton (R-IN)	March 4, 1867	
9	Simon Cameron (R-PA)	March 4, 1867	
10	Orris S. Ferry (R-CT)	March 4, 1867	
11	George E. Spencer (R-AL)	July 13, 1868	
12	Thomas J. Robertson (R-SC)	July 15, 1868	
13	Thomas F. Bayard (D-DE)	March 4, 1869	
14	Hannibal Hamlin (R-ME)	March 4, 1869	Former governor, former representative, former vice president
15	Allen G. Thurman (D-OH)	March 4, 1869	
16	Lot M. Morrill (R-ME)	October 30, 1869	
17	Morgan C. Hamilton (R-TX)	March 31, 1870	
18	Eli Saulsbury (D-DE)	March 4, 1871	
19	Thomas W. Ferry (R-MI)	March 4, 1871	
20	William Windom (R-MN)	March 4, 1871	Former representative
21	Henry G. Davis (D-WV)	March 4, 1871	
22	George Goldthwaite (D-AL)	March 4, 1871	
23	Powell Clayton (R-AR)	March 4, 1871	
24	John A. Logan (R-IL)	March 4, 1871	
25	George G. Wright (R-IA)	March 4, 1871	
26	John W. Stevenson (D-KY)	March 4, 1871	
27	Joseph R. West (R-LA)	March 4, 1871	
28	Phineas Hitchcock (R-NE)	March 4, 1871	Former delegate
29	Frederick T. Frelinghuysen (R-NJ)	March 4, 1871	
30	James K. Kelly (D-OR)	March 4, 1871	
31	Henry Cooper (D-TN)	March 4, 1871	
32	John W. Johnston (D-VA)	March 15, 1871	
33	Thomas M. Norwood (D-GA)	November 14, 1871	
34	James L. Alcorn (R-MS)	December 1, 1871	
35	Matt W. Ransom (D-NC)	January 30, 1872	
36	William B. Allison (R-IA)	March 4, 1873	Former representative
37	John P. Jones (R-NV)	March 4, 1873	
38	John Brown Gordon (D-GA)	March 4, 1873	
39	Stephen Wallace Dorsey (R-AR)	March 4, 1873	
40	Aaron A. Sargent (R-CA)	March 4, 1873	Former representative
41	Simon B. Conover (R-FL)	March 4, 1873	
42	Richard J. Oglesby (R-IL)	March 4, 1873	
43	Thomas C. McCreery (D-KY)	March 4, 1873	
44	John J. Ingalls (R-KS)	March 4, 1873	
45	George R. Dennis (D-MD)	March 4, 1873	
46	Lewis V. Bogy (D-MO)	March 4, 1873	
47	Bainbridge Wadleigh (R-NH)	March 4, 1873	
48	Augustus S. Merrimon (D-NC)	March 4, 1873	
49	John H. Mitchell (R-OR)	March 4, 1873	
50	John J. Patterson (R-SC)	March 4, 1873	
51	George S. Boutwell (R-MA)	March 17, 1873	
52	James M. Harvey (R-KS)	February 8, 1874	
53	William W. Eaton (D-CT)	February 5, 1875	
54	Francis Cockrell (D-MO)	March 4, 1875	
55	Henry L. Dawes (R-MA)	March 4, 1875	
56	Charles W. Jones (D-FL)	March 4, 1875	
57	Samuel J. R. McMillan (R-MN)	March 4, 1875	
58	Samuel B. Maxey (D-TX)	March 4, 1875	
59	Ambrose Burnside (R-RI)	March 4, 1875	Former governor
60	Newton Booth (AM-CA)	March 4, 1875	Former governor
61	Joseph E. McDonald (D-IN)	March 4, 1875	Former representative
62	William Pinkney Whyte (D-MD)	March 4, 1875	
63	Blanche Bruce (R-MS)	March 4, 1875	
64	Algernon Paddock (R-NE)	March 4, 1875	
65	Theodore F. Randolph (D-NJ)	March 4, 1875	Former governor
66	Francis Kernan (D-NY)	March 4, 1875	
67	William A. Wallace (D-PA)	March 4, 1875	
68	Robert E. Withers (D-VA)	March 4, 1875	
69	Isaac P. Christiancy (R-MI)	March 4, 1875	
70	Andrew Johnson (D-TN)	March 4, 1875	Former president, previously a senator
71	Allen T. Caperton (D-WV)	March 4, 1875	
72	William Sharon (R-NV)	March 4, 1875	
	David M. Key (D-TN)	August 18, 1875	
	James E. English (D-CT)	November 27, 1875	Former representative, former governor
	James B. Eustis (D-LA)	January 12, 1876	
	William H. Barnum (D-CT)	May 18, 1876	
	James G. Blaine (R-ME)	July 10, 1876	Former representative
	Samuel Price (D-TN)	August 26, 1876	
	Henry M. Teller (R-CO)	November 15, 1876	
	Jerome B. Chaffee (R-CO)	November 15, 1876	
	James E. Bailey (D-TN)	January 19, 1877	
	Frank Hereford (D-WV)	January 31, 1877	

== See also ==
- 44th United States Congress
- List of United States representatives in the 44th Congress
