= 44th United States Congress =

1875-1877 U.S. Congress

←	43rd	45th	→
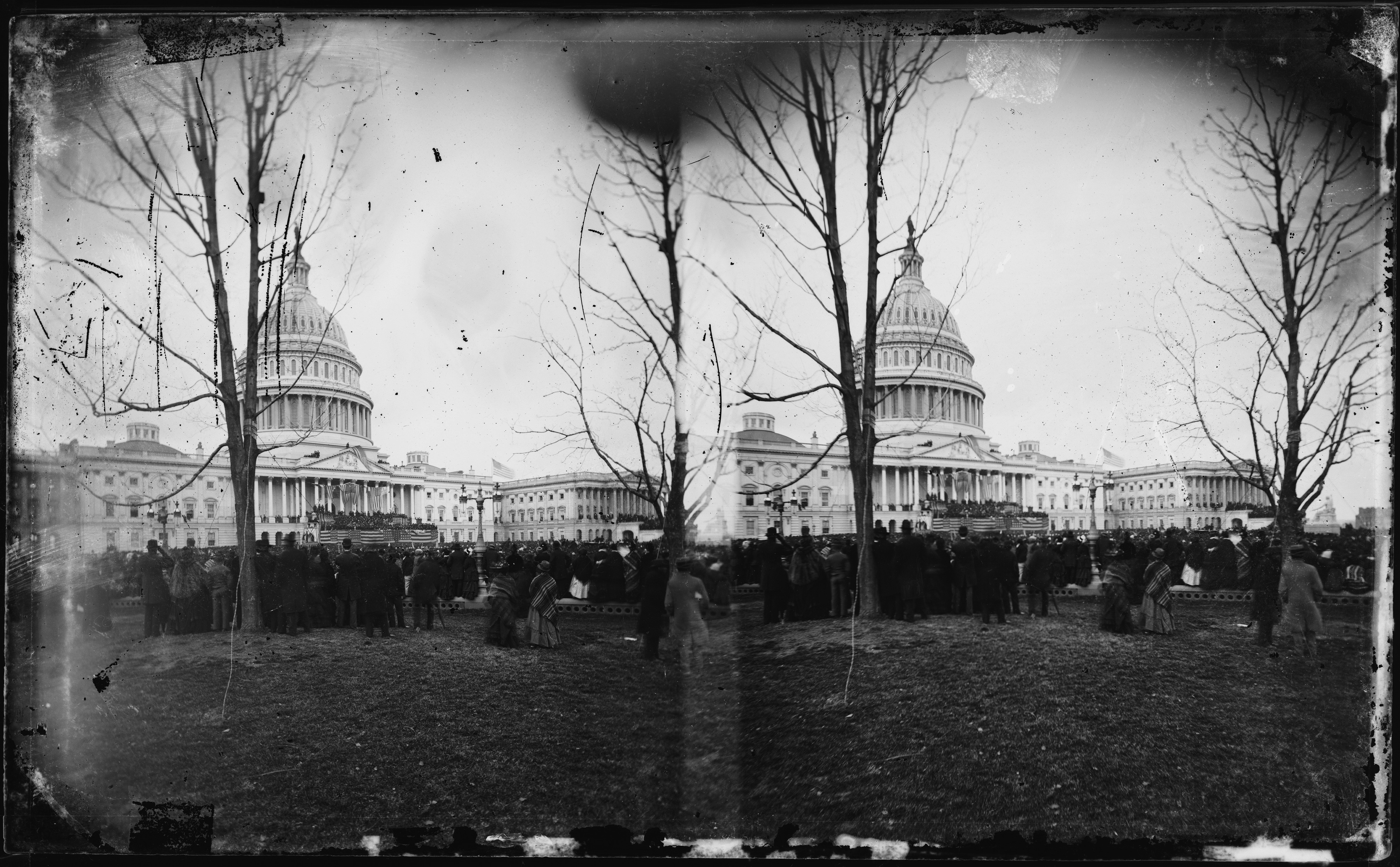
- United States Capitol (1877)

Overview
- Legislative body: United States Congress
- Jurisdiction: United States
- Term: March 4, 1875 – March 4, 1877

Senate
- Members: 76
- President: Henry Wilson (R) (until November 22, 1875); Vacant (from November 22, 1875)
- President pro tempore: Thomas W. Ferry (R) from March 9, 1875
- Party control: Republican

House of Representatives
- Members: 293 representatives 9 non-voting delegates
- Speaker: Michael C. Kerr (D) until August 19, 1876; Samuel J. Randall (D) from December 4, 1876
- Party control: Democratic

Sessions
- Special (Note: Special session of the Senate.): March 5, 1875 – March 24, 1875
- 1st: December 6, 1875 – August 15, 1876
- 2nd: December 4, 1876 – March 3, 1877

The 44th United States Congress was a meeting of the legislative branch of the United States federal government, consisting of the United States Senate and the United States House of Representatives. It met in Washington, D.C. from March 4, 1875, to March 4, 1877, during the seventh and eighth years of Ulysses S. Grant's presidency. The apportionment of seats in the House of Representatives was based on the 1870 United States census. For the first time since the American Civil War, the House had a Democratic majority. The Senate maintained a Republican majority.

== Major events ==
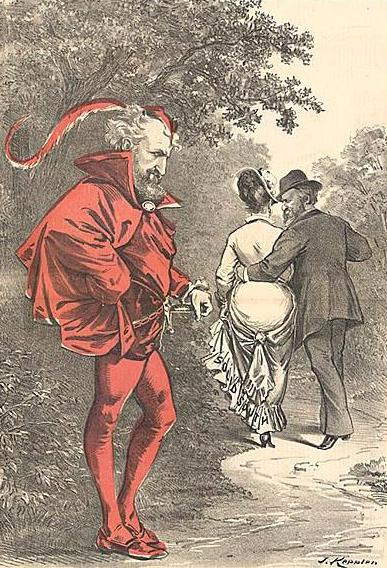
A political cartoon by Joseph Keppler depicts Roscoe Conkling as Mephistopheles, as Rutherford B. Hayes strolls off with a woman labeled as "Solid South"

- November 22, 1875: Vice President Henry Wilson died from a stroke
- June 25, 1876: Custer's Last Stand at the Battle of Little Bighorn
- July 4, 1876: United States Centennial
- November 7, 1876: United States general elections, 1876, including the disputed Presidential election of 1876, later settled with the Compromise of 1877 which ended Reconstruction.

== Major legislation ==
- January 29, 1877: Electoral Commission Act, ch. 37, 19 Stat. 227
- March 3, 1877: Desert Land Act, ch. 107, 19 Stat. 377

== State admitted ==
- August 1, 1876: Colorado admitted as the 38th state

== Party summary ==
The count below identifies party affiliations at the beginning of the first session of this Congress, and includes members from vacancies and newly admitted states, when they were first seated. Changes resulting from subsequent replacements are shown below in the "Changes in membership" section.

During this Congress, two Senate seats and one House seat were added for the new state, Colorado.

=== Senate ===
Senate membership

Beginning of the Congress

Ending of the Congress

	Party (shading shows control)				Total	Vacant
	Democratic (D)	Anti- Monopoly (AM)	Republican (R)	Other	Total	Vacant
End of previous congress	20	0	51	2 (Note: Liberal Republican)	73	1
Begin	28	1	44	0	73	1
End	30	1	45	0	76	0
Final voting share	39.5%	1.3%	59.2%	0.0%		
Beginning of next congress	35	1	39	1 (Note: Independent)	76	0

=== House of Representatives ===
House membership

Beginning of the Congress

Ending of the Congress

Affiliation	Party (Shading indicates majority caucus)						Total	
Affiliation	Democratic (D)	Independent Democratic (ID)	Independent (I)	Independent Republican (IR)	Republican (R)	Other	Total	Vacant
End of previous Congress	95	7	0	0	199	(Liberal; Republican); 4	290	2
Begin	176	1	4	4	104	0	289	3
End	179	1	4	3	103	0	290	3
Final voting share	62.8%		1.4%	35.8%		0.0%		
Beginning of the next Congress	144	2	0	0	146	0	292	1

== Leadership ==
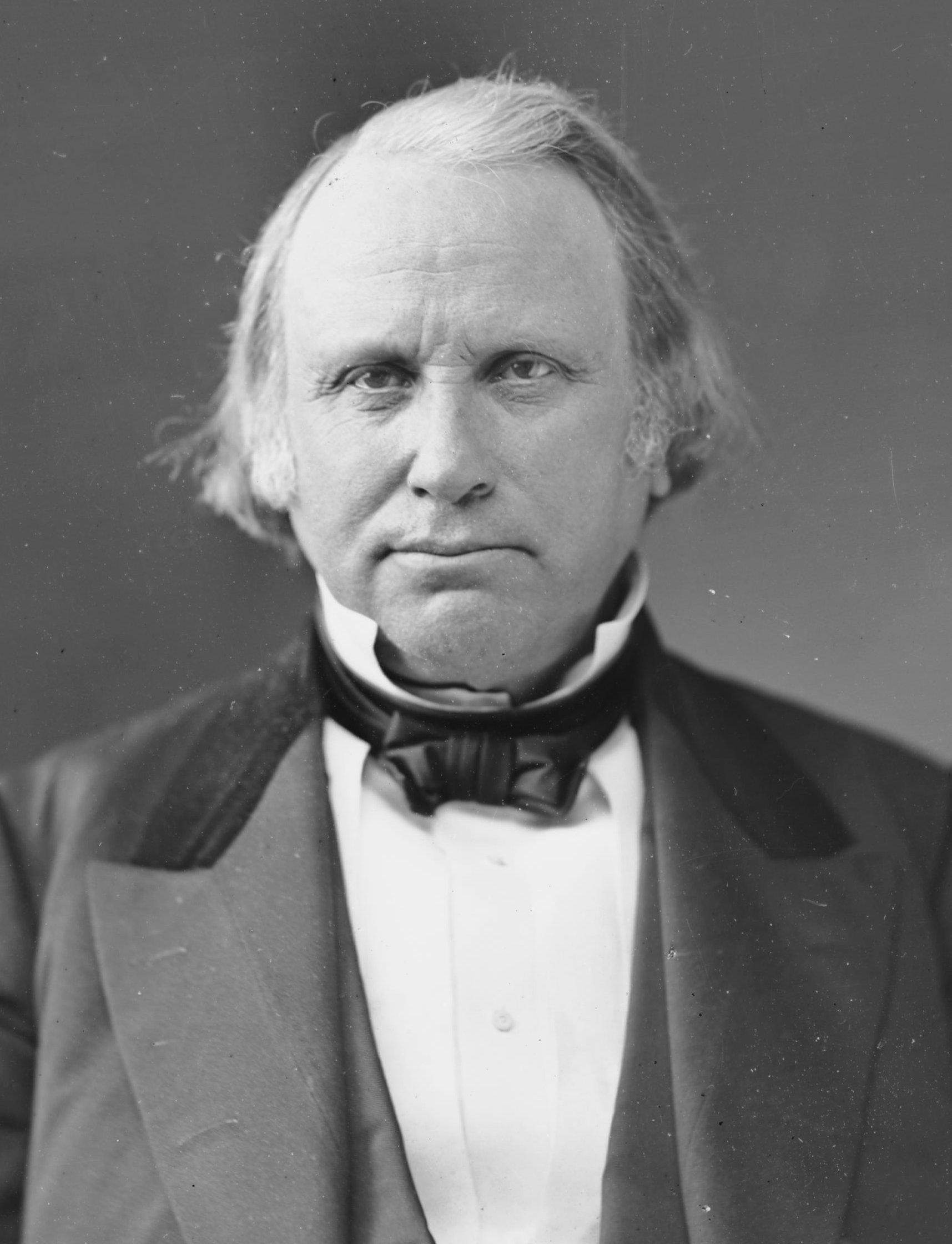
President of the Senate Henry Wilson

=== Senate ===
- President: Henry Wilson (R), until November 22, 1875; vacant thereafter.
- President pro tempore: Thomas W. Ferry (R), from March 9, 1875
- Republican Conference Chairman: Henry B. Anthony
- Democratic Caucus Chairman: John W. Stevenson

=== House of Representatives ===
- Speaker: Michael C. Kerr (D), until August 19, 1876 (died)
  - Samuel J. Randall (D), elected December 4, 1876
- Democratic Caucus Chairman: Lucius Quintus Cincinnatus Lamar II
- Republican Conference Chairman: George W. McCrary

== Members ==
This list is arranged by chamber, then by state. Senators are listed by class, and representatives are listed by district.

Skip to House of Representatives, below

=== Senate ===
Senators were elected by the state legislatures every two years, with one-third beginning new six-year terms with each Congress. Preceding the names in the list below are Senate class numbers, which indicate the cycle of their election. In this Congress, Class 1 meant their term began in this Congress, facing re-election in 1880; Class 2 meant their term ended in this Congress, facing re-election in 1876; and Class 3 meant their term began in the last Congress, facing re-election in 1878.

==== Alabama ====
▌2. George Goldthwaite (D)
▌3. George E. Spencer (R)

==== Arkansas ====
▌2. Powell Clayton (R)
▌3. Stephen W. Dorsey (R)

==== California ====
▌1. Newton Booth (AM)
▌3. Aaron A. Sargent (R)

==== Colorado ====
▌2. Henry M. Teller (R), from November 15, 1876
▌3. Jerome B. Chaffee (R), from November 15, 1876

==== Connecticut ====
▌1. William W. Eaton (D)
▌3. Orris S. Ferry (R), until November 21, 1875

▌James E. English (D), November 27, 1875 – May 17, 1876
▌William H. Barnum (D), from May 18, 1876

==== Delaware ====
▌1. Thomas F. Bayard Sr. (D)
▌2. Eli Saulsbury (D)

==== Florida ====
▌1. Charles W. Jones (D)
▌3. Simon B. Conover (R)

==== Georgia ====
▌2. Thomas M. Norwood (D)
▌3. John B. Gordon (D)

==== Illinois ====
▌2. John A. Logan (R)
▌3. Richard J. Oglesby (R)

==== Indiana ====
▌1. Joseph E. McDonald (D)
▌3. Oliver H. P. T. Morton (R)

==== Iowa ====
▌2. George G. Wright (R)
▌3. William B. Allison (R)

==== Kansas ====
▌2. James M. Harvey (R)
▌3. John J. Ingalls (R)

==== Kentucky ====
▌2. John W. Stevenson (D)
▌3. Thomas C. McCreery (D)

==== Louisiana ====
▌2. J. Rodman West (R)
▌3. James B. Eustis (D), from January 12, 1876

==== Maine ====
▌1. Hannibal Hamlin (R)
▌2. Lot M. Morrill (R), until July 7, 1876

▌James G. Blaine (R), from July 10, 1876

==== Maryland ====
▌1. William Pinkney Whyte (D)
▌3. George R. Dennis (D)

==== Massachusetts ====
▌1. Henry L. Dawes (R)
▌2. George S. Boutwell (R)

==== Michigan ====
▌1. Isaac P. Christiancy (R)
▌2. Thomas W. Ferry (R)

==== Minnesota ====
▌1. Samuel J. R. McMillan (R)
▌2. William Windom (R)

==== Mississippi ====
▌1. Blanche Bruce (R)
▌2. James L. Alcorn (R)

==== Missouri ====
▌1. Francis Cockrell (D)
▌3. Lewis V. Bogy (D)

==== Nebraska ====
▌1. Algernon Paddock (R)
▌2. Phineas Hitchcock (R)

==== Nevada ====
▌1. William Sharon (R)
▌3. John P. Jones (R)

==== New Hampshire ====
▌2. Aaron H. Cragin (R)
▌3. Bainbridge Wadleigh (R)

==== New Jersey ====
▌1. Theodore F. Randolph (D)
▌2. Frederick T. Frelinghuysen (R)

==== New York ====
▌1. Francis Kernan (D)
▌3. Roscoe Conkling (R)

==== North Carolina ====
▌2. Matt W. Ransom (D)
▌3. Augustus S. Merrimon (D)

==== Ohio ====
▌1. Allen G. Thurman (D)
▌3. John Sherman (R)

==== Oregon ====
▌2. James K. Kelly (D)
▌3. John H. Mitchell (R)

==== Pennsylvania ====
▌1. William A. Wallace (D)
▌3. Simon Cameron (R)

==== Rhode Island ====
▌1. Ambrose Burnside (R)
▌2. Henry B. Anthony (R)

==== South Carolina ====
▌2. Thomas J. Robertson (R)
▌3. John J. Patterson (R)

==== Tennessee ====
▌1. Andrew Johnson (D), until July 31, 1875

▌David M. Key (D), August 18, 1875 – January 19, 1877
▌James E. Bailey (D), from January 19, 1877

▌2. Henry Cooper (D)

==== Texas ====
▌1. Samuel B. Maxey (D)
▌2. Morgan C. Hamilton (R)

==== Vermont ====
▌1. George F. Edmunds (R)
▌3. Justin S. Morrill (R)

==== Virginia ====
▌1. Robert E. Withers (D)
▌2. John W. Johnston (D)

==== West Virginia ====
▌1. Allen T. Caperton (D), until July 26, 1876

▌Samuel Price (D), August 26, 1876 – January 26, 1877
▌Frank Hereford (D), from January 31, 1877

▌2. Henry G. Davis (D)

==== Wisconsin ====
▌1. Angus Cameron (R)
▌3. Timothy O. Howe (R)

Senators' party membership by state at the opening of the 44th Congress in March 1875. The green stripes in California represent Newton Booth of the Anti-Monopoly Party. Colorado's senators were not seated until November 15, 1876. 2 Democrats 1 Democrat and 1 Republican 2 Republicans Territories

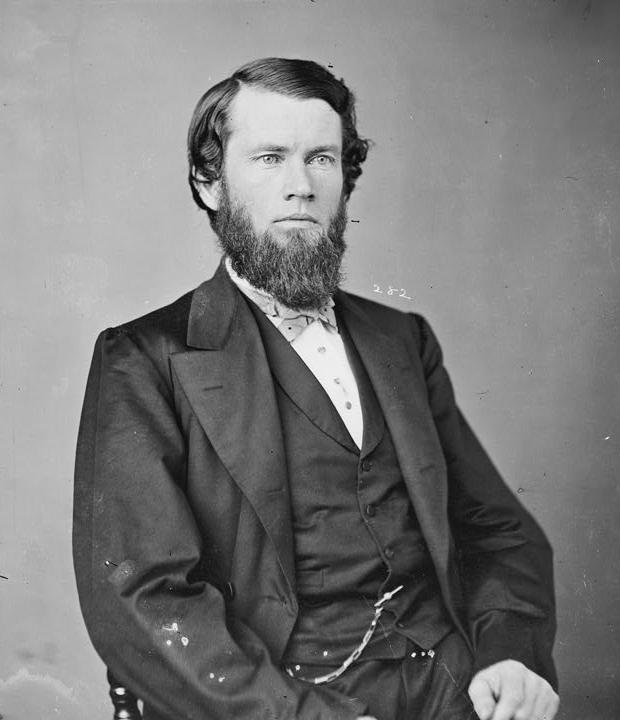
President pro tempore Thomas W. Ferry

=== House of Representatives ===
The names of representatives are preceded by their district numbers.

==== Alabama ====
▌1. Jeremiah Haralson (R)
▌2. Jeremiah N. Williams (D)
▌3. Taul Bradford (D)
▌4. Charles Hays (R)
▌5. John H. Caldwell (D)
▌6. Goldsmith W. Hewitt (D)
▌At-large. William H. Forney (D)
▌At-large. Burwell B. Lewis (D)

==== Arkansas ====
▌1. Lucien C. Gause (D)
▌2. William F. Slemons (D)
▌3. William W. Wilshire (D)
▌4. Thomas M. Gunter (D)

==== California ====
▌1. William A. Piper (D)
▌2. Horace F. Page (R)
▌3. John K. Luttrell (D)
▌4. Peter D. Wigginton (D)

==== Colorado ====
▌At-large. James B. Belford (R), from October 3, 1876 (newly admitted state)

==== Connecticut ====
▌1. George M. Landers (D)
▌2. James Phelps (D)
▌3. Henry H. Starkweather (R), until January 28, 1876

▌John T. Wait (R), from April 12, 1876

▌4. William H. Barnum (D), until May 18, 1876

▌Levi Warner (D), from December 4, 1876

==== Delaware ====
▌At-large. James Williams (D)

==== Florida ====
▌1. William J. Purman (R)
▌2. Josiah T. Walls (R), until April 19, 1876

▌Jesse J. Finley (D), from April 19, 1876

==== Georgia ====
▌1. Julian Hartridge (D)
▌2. William E. Smith (D)
▌3. Philip Cook (D)
▌4. Henry R. Harris (D)
▌5. Milton A. Candler (D)
▌6. James H. Blount (D)
▌7. William H. Felton (ID)
▌8. Alexander Stephens (D)
▌9. Benjamin H. Hill (D), May 5, 1875 - March 3, 1877

==== Illinois ====
▌1. Bernard G. Caulfield (D)
▌2. Carter H. Harrison (D)
▌3. Charles B. Farwell (R), until May 6, 1876

▌John V. Le Moyne (D), from May 6, 1876

▌4. Stephen A. Hurlbut (R)
▌5. Horatio C. Burchard (R)
▌6. Thomas J. Henderson (R)
▌7. Alexander Campbell (I)
▌8. Greenbury L. Fort (R)
▌9. Richard H. Whiting (R)
▌10. John C. Bagby (D)
▌11. Scott Wike (D)
▌12. William M. Springer (D)
▌13. Adlai E. Stevenson (D)
▌14. Joseph G. Cannon (R)
▌15. John R. Eden (D)
▌16. William A. J. Sparks (D)
▌17. William R. Morrison (D)
▌18. William Hartzell (D)
▌19. William B. Anderson (I)

==== Indiana ====
▌1. Benoni S. Fuller (D)
▌2. James D. Williams (D), until December 1, 1876

▌Andrew Humphreys (D), from December 5, 1876

▌3. Michael C. Kerr (D), until August 19, 1876

▌Nathan T. Carr (D), from December 5, 1876

▌4. Jeptha D. New (D)
▌5. William S. Holman (D)
▌6. Milton S. Robinson (R)
▌7. Franklin Landers (D)
▌8. Morton C. Hunter (R)
▌9. Thomas J. Cason (R)
▌10. William S. Haymond (D)
▌11. James L. Evans (R)
▌12. Andrew H. Hamilton (D)
▌13. John Baker (R)

==== Iowa ====
▌1. George W. McCrary (R)
▌2. John Q. Tufts (R)
▌3. Lucien L. Ainsworth (D)
▌4. Henry O. Pratt (R)
▌5. James Wilson (R)
▌6. Ezekiel S. Sampson (R)
▌7. John A. Kasson (R)
▌8. James W. McDill (R)
▌9. S. Addison Oliver (R)

==== Kansas ====
▌1. William A. Phillips (R)
▌2. John R. Goodin (D)
▌3. William R. Brown (R)

==== Kentucky ====
▌1. Andrew Boone (D)
▌2. John Y. Brown (D)
▌3. Charles W. Milliken (D)
▌4. J. Proctor Knott (D)
▌5. Edward Y. Parsons (D), until July 8, 1876

▌Henry Watterson (D), from August 12, 1876

▌6. Thomas L. Jones (D)
▌7. Joseph C. S. Blackburn (D)
▌8. Milton J. Durham (D)
▌9. John D. White (R)
▌10. John B. Clarke (D)

==== Louisiana ====
▌1. Randall L. Gibson (D)
▌2. E. John Ellis (D)
▌3. Chester B. Darrall (R)
▌4. William M. Levy (D)
▌5. Frank Morey (R), until June 8, 1876

▌William B. Spencer (D) June 8, 1876 - January 8, 1877

▌6. Charles E. Nash (R)

==== Maine ====
▌1. John H. Burleigh (R)
▌2. William P. Frye (R)
▌3. James G. Blaine (R), until July 10, 1876

▌Edwin Flye (R), from December 4, 1876

▌4. Harris M. Plaisted (R), from September 13, 1875
▌5. Eugene Hale (R)

==== Maryland ====
▌1. Philip F. Thomas (D)
▌2. Charles B. Roberts (D)
▌3. William J. O'Brien (D)
▌4. Thomas Swann (D)
▌5. Eli J. Henkle (D)
▌6. William Walsh (D)

==== Massachusetts ====
▌1. James Buffington (R), until March 7, 1875

▌William W. Crapo (R), from November 2, 1875

▌2. Benjamin W. Harris (R)
▌3. Henry L. Pierce (R)
▌4. Rufus S. Frost (R), until July 28, 1876

▌Josiah G. Abbott (D), from July 28, 1876

▌5. Nathaniel P. Banks (I)
▌6. Charles P. Thompson (D)
▌7. John K. Tarbox (D)
▌8. William W. Warren (D)
▌9. George F. Hoar (R)
▌10. Julius H. Seelye (I)
▌11. Chester W. Chapin (D)

==== Michigan ====
▌1. Alpheus S. Williams (D)
▌2. Henry Waldron (R)
▌3. George Willard (R)
▌4. Allen Potter (D)
▌5. William B. Williams (R)
▌6. George H. Durand (D)
▌7. Omar D. Conger (R)
▌8. Nathan B. Bradley (R)
▌9. Jay A. Hubbell (R)

==== Minnesota ====
▌1. Mark H. Dunnell (R)
▌2. Horace B. Strait (R)
▌3. William S. King (R)

==== Mississippi ====
▌1. Lucius Q. C. Lamar (D)
▌2. G. Wiley Wells (IR)
▌3. Hernando Money (D)
▌4. Otho R. Singleton (D)
▌5. Charles E. Hooker (D)
▌6. John R. Lynch (R)

==== Missouri ====
▌1. Edward C. Kehr (D)
▌2. Erastus Wells (D)
▌3. William H. Stone (D)
▌4. Robert A. Hatcher (D)
▌5. Richard P. Bland (D)
▌6. Charles H. Morgan (D)
▌7. John F. Philips (D)
▌8. Benjamin J. Franklin (D)
▌9. David Rea (D)
▌10. Rezin A. De Bolt (D)
▌11. John B. Clark Jr. (D)
▌12. John M. Glover (D)
▌13. Aylett H. Buckner (D)

==== Nebraska ====
▌At-large. Lorenzo Crounse (R)

==== Nevada ====
▌At-large. William Woodburn (R)

==== New Hampshire ====
▌1. Frank Jones (D)
▌2. Samuel N. Bell (D)
▌3. Henry W. Blair (R)

==== New Jersey ====
▌1. Clement H. Sinnickson (R)
▌2. Samuel A. Dobbins (R)
▌3. Miles Ross (D)
▌4. Robert Hamilton (D)
▌5. Augustus W. Cutler (D)
▌6. Frederick H. Teese (D)
▌7. Augustus A. Hardenbergh (D)

==== New York ====
▌1. Henry B. Metcalfe (D)
▌2. John G. Schumaker (D)
▌3. Simeon B. Chittenden (IR)
▌4. Archibald M. Bliss (D)
▌5. Edwin R. Meade (D)
▌6. Samuel S. Cox (D)
▌7. Smith Ely Jr. (D), until December 11, 1876

▌David Dudley Field (D), from January 11, 1877

▌8. Elijah Ward (D)
▌9. Fernando Wood (D)
▌10. Abram S. Hewitt (D)
▌11. Benjamin A. Willis (D)
▌12. N. Holmes Odell (D)
▌13. John O. Whitehouse (D)
▌14. George M. Beebe (D)
▌15. John H. Bagley Jr. (D)
▌16. Charles H. Adams (R)
▌17. Martin I. Townsend (R)
▌18. Andrew Williams (R)
▌19. William A. Wheeler (R)
▌20. Henry H. Hathorn (R)
▌21. Samuel F. Miller (R)
▌22. George A. Bagley (R)
▌23. Scott Lord (D)
▌24. William H. Baker (R)
▌25. Elias W. Leavenworth (R)
▌26. Clinton D. MacDougall (R)
▌27. Elbridge G. Lapham (R)
▌28. Thomas C. Platt (R)
▌29. Charles C. B. Walker (D)
▌30. John M. Davy (R)
▌31. George G. Hoskins (R)
▌32. Lyman K. Bass (R)
▌33. Nelson I. Norton (R), from December 6, 1875

==== North Carolina ====
▌1. Jesse J. Yeates (D)
▌2. John A. Hyman (R)
▌3. Alfred M. Waddell (D)
▌4. Joseph J. Davis (D)
▌5. Alfred M. Scales (D)
▌6. Thomas S. Ashe (D)
▌7. William M. Robbins (D)
▌8. Robert B. Vance (D)

==== Ohio ====
▌1. Milton Sayler (D)
▌2. Henry B. Banning (D)
▌3. John S. Savage (D)
▌4. John A. McMahon (D)
▌5. Americus V. Rice (D)
▌6. Frank H. Hurd (D)
▌7. Lawrence T. Neal (D)
▌8. William Lawrence (R)
▌9. Earley F. Poppleton (D)
▌10. Charles Foster (R)
▌11. John L. Vance (D)
▌12. Ansel T. Walling (D)
▌13. Milton I. Southard (D)
▌14. Jacob P. Cowan (D)
▌15. Nelson H. Van Vorhes (R)
▌16. Lorenzo Danford (R)
▌17. Laurin D. Woodworth (R)
▌18. James Monroe (R)
▌19. James A. Garfield (R)
▌20. Henry B. Payne (D)

==== Oregon ====
▌At-large. George A. La Dow (D), until May 1, 1875

▌Lafayette Lane (D), from October 25, 1875

==== Pennsylvania ====
▌1. Chapman Freeman (R)
▌2. Charles O'Neill (R)
▌3. Samuel J. Randall (D)
▌4. William D. Kelley (R)
▌5. John Robbins Jr. (D)
▌6. Washington Townsend (R)
▌7. Alan Wood Jr. (R)
▌8. Hiester Clymer (D)
▌9. A. Herr Smith (R)
▌10. William Mutchler (D)
▌11. Francis D. Collins (D)
▌12. Winthrop W. Ketcham (R), until July 19, 1876

▌William H. Stanton (D), from November 7, 1876

▌13. James B. Reilly (D)
▌14. John B. Packer (R)
▌15. Joseph Powell (D)
▌16. Sobieski Ross (R)
▌17. John Reilly (D)
▌18. William Stenger (D)
▌19. Levi Maish (D)
▌20. Levi A. Mackey (D)
▌21. Jacob Turney (D)
▌22. James H. Hopkins (D)
▌23. Alexander G. Cochran (D)
▌24. John W. Wallace (R)
▌25. George A. Jenks (D)
▌26. James Sheakley (D)
▌27. Albert G. Egbert (D)

==== Rhode Island ====
▌1. Benjamin T. Eames (R)
▌2. Latimer W. Ballou (R)

==== South Carolina ====
▌1. Joseph Rainey (R)
▌2. Edmund W. M. Mackey (IR), until July 19, 1876

▌Charles W. Buttz (R), from November 7, 1876

▌3. Solomon L. Hoge (R)
▌4. Alexander S. Wallace (R)
▌5. Robert Smalls (R)

==== Tennessee ====
▌1. William McFarland (D)
▌2. Jacob M. Thornburgh (R)
▌3. George G. Dibrell (D)
▌4. Samuel M. Fite (D), until October 23, 1875

▌Haywood Y. Riddle (D), from December 4, 1875

▌5. John M. Bright (D)
▌6. John F. House (D)
▌7. Washington C. Whitthorne (D)
▌8. John D. C. Atkins (D)
▌9. William P. Caldwell (D)
▌10. H. Casey Young (D)

==== Texas ====
▌1. John H. Reagan (D)
▌2. David B. Culberson (D)
▌3. James W. Throckmorton (D)
▌4. Roger Q. Mills (D)
▌5. John Hancock (D)
▌6. Gustave Schleicher (D)

==== Vermont ====
▌1. Charles H. Joyce (R)
▌2. Dudley C. Denison (IR)
▌3. George W. Hendee (R)

==== Virginia ====
▌1. Beverly B. Douglas (D)
▌2. John Goode Jr. (D)
▌3. Gilbert C. Walker (D)
▌4. William H. H. Stowell (R)
▌5. George Cabell (D)
▌6. John R. Tucker (D)
▌7. John T. Harris (D)
▌8. Eppa Hutton, II (D)
▌9. William Terry (D)

==== West Virginia ====
▌1. Benjamin Wilson (D)
▌2. Charles J. Faulkner Sr. (D)
▌3. Frank Hereford (D), until January 31, 1877

==== Wisconsin ====
▌1. Charles G. Williams (R)
▌2. Lucien B. Caswell (R)
▌3. Henry S. Magoon (R)
▌4. William P. Lynde (D)
▌5. Samuel D. Burchard (D)
▌6. Alanson M. Kimball (R)
▌7. Jeremiah M. Rusk (R)
▌8. George W. Cate (D)

==== Non-voting members ====
▌Arizona Territory. Hiram S. Stevens (D)
▌Colorado Territory. Thomas M. Patterson (D), until August 1, 1876
▌Dakota Territory. Jefferson P. Kidder (R)
▌Idaho Territory. Thomas W. Bennett (I), until June 23, 1876

▌Stephen S. Fenn (D), from June 23, 1876

▌Montana Territory. Martin Maginnis (D)
▌New Mexico Territory. Stephen B. Elkins (R)
▌Utah Territory. George Q. Cannon (R)
▌Washington Territory. Orange Jacobs (R)
▌Wyoming Territory. William R. Steele (D)

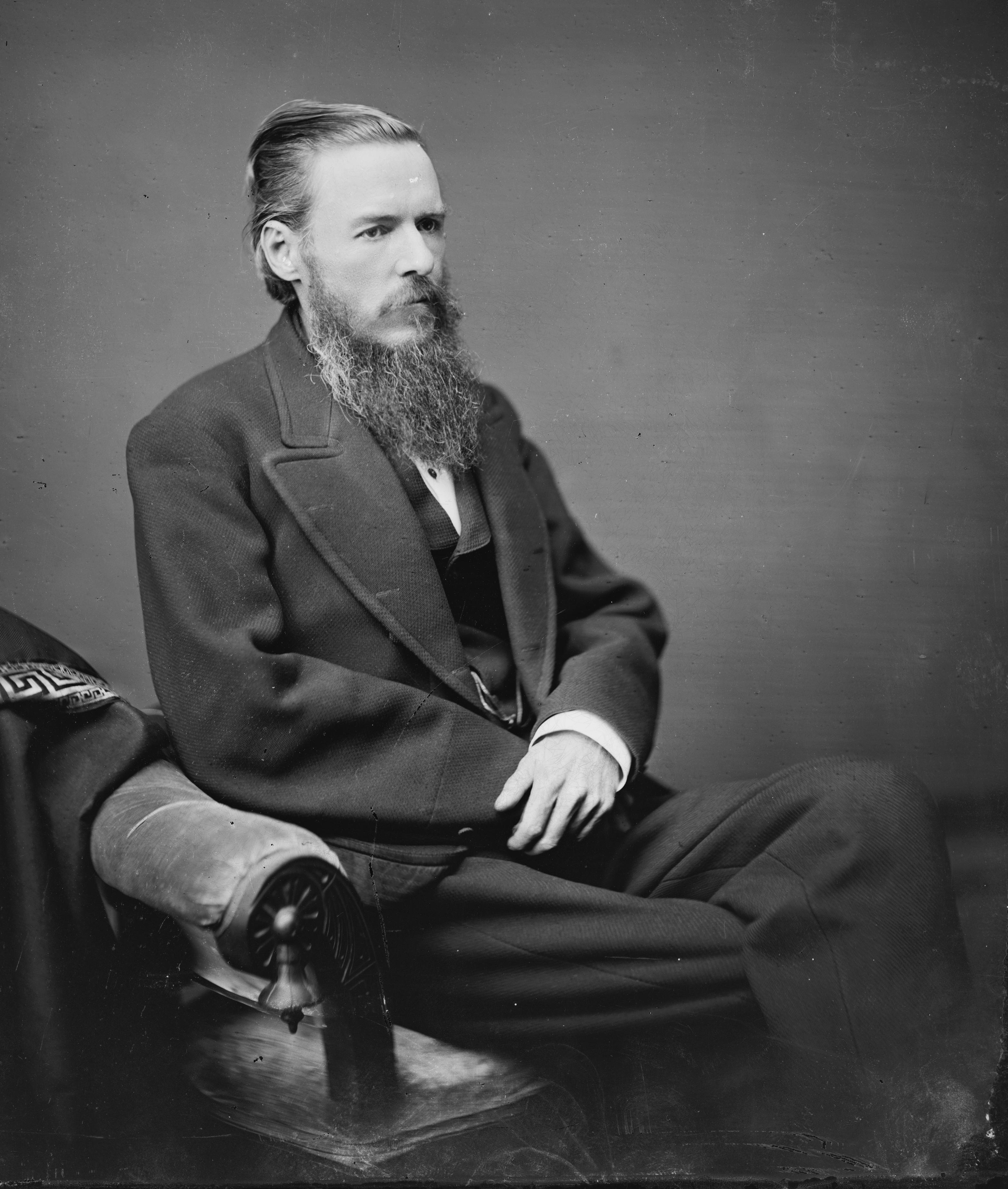
Speaker Michael C. Kerr

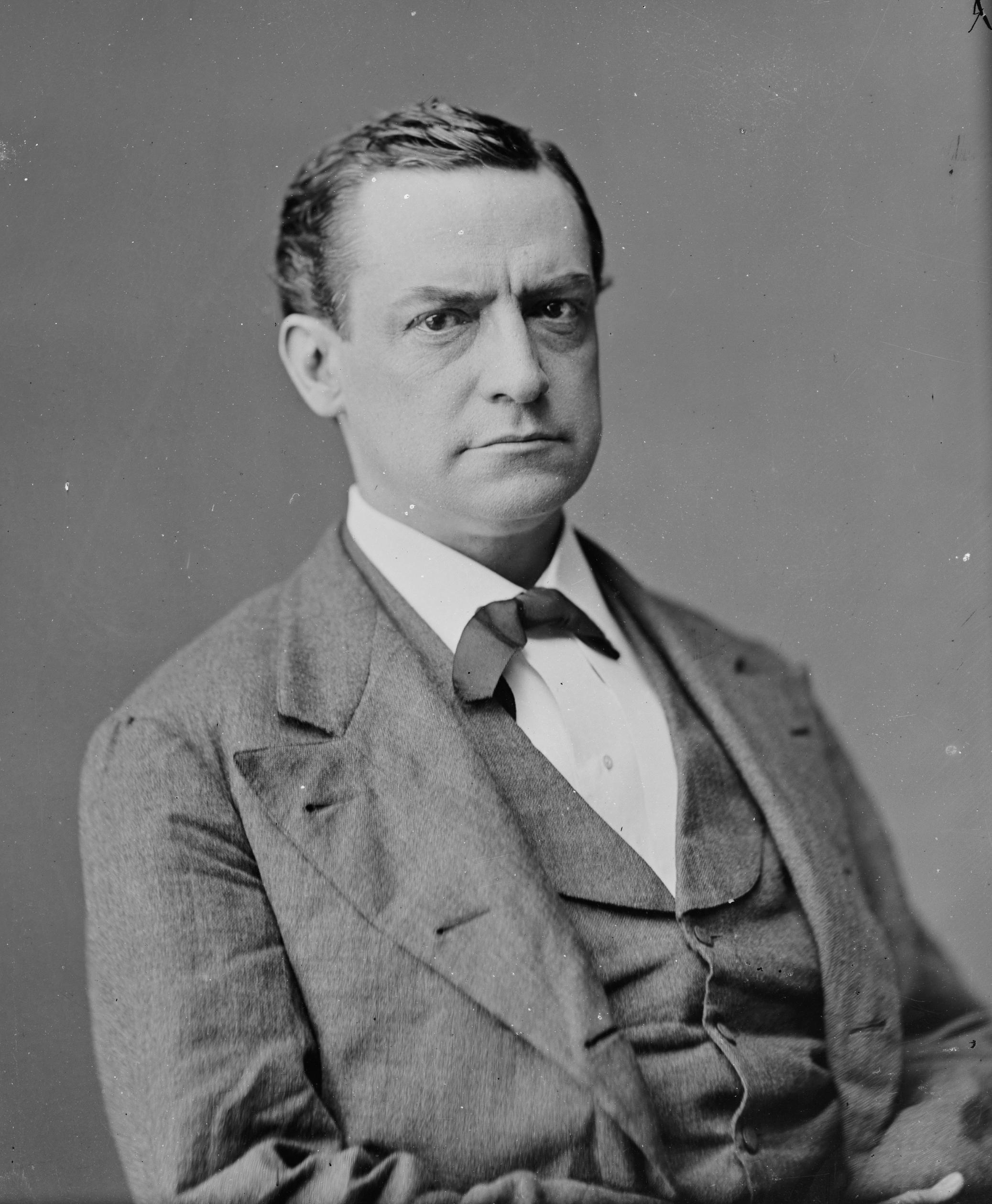
Speaker Samuel J. Randall

== Changes in membership ==
The count below reflects changes from the beginning of the first session of this Congress.

=== Senate ===
- Replacements: 4
  - Democratic: 1 seat net gain
  - Republican: 1 seat net loss
- Deaths: 3
- Resignations: 1
- Vacancy: 1
- Interim appointments: 3
- Seats of newly admitted states: 2
- Total seats with changes: 7

Senate changes
State (class)	Vacated by	Reason for change	Successor	Date of successor's formal installation (Note: When seated or oath administered, not necessarily when service began.)
Louisiana (3)	Vacant	Senate had declined to seat rival claimants William L. McMillen and P. B. S. Pinchback. Successor elected January 12, 1876.	James B. Eustis (D)	January 10, 1876
Tennessee (1)	Andrew Johnson (D)	Died July 31, 1875. Successor appointed August 18, 1875, to continue the term.	David M. Key (D)	August 18, 1875
Connecticut (3)	Orris S. Ferry (R)	Died November 21, 1875. Successor appointed November 27, 1875, to continue the term.	James E. English (D)	November 27, 1875
Connecticut (3)	James E. English (D)	Interim appointee retired May 17, 1876 when successor elected. Successor elected May 17, 1876.	William H. Barnum (D)	May 18, 1876
Maine (2)	Lot M. Morrill (R)	Resigned July 7, 1876 to become U.S. Secretary of the Treasury. Successor appointed July 10, 1876, to continue the term. Interim appointee later elected January 17, 1877.	James G. Blaine (R)	July 10, 1876
West Virginia (1)	Allen T. Caperton (D)	Died July 26, 1876. Successor appointed August 26, 1876, to continue the term.	Samuel Price (D)	August 26, 1876
Colorado (2)	New seat	Colorado admitted to the Union August 1, 1876. First senator elected November 15, 1876	Henry M. Teller (R)	November 15, 1876
Colorado (3)	New seat	Colorado admitted to the Union August 1, 1876. First senator elected November 15, 1876	Jerome B. Chaffee (R)	November 15, 1876
Tennessee (1)	David M. Key (D)	Interim appointee lost special election. Successor elected January 19, 1877.	James E. Bailey (D)	January 19, 1877
West Virginia (1)	Samuel Price (D)	Interim appointee lost special election. Successor elected January 26, 1877, but seat remained vacant until successor qualified by resigning from the U.S. House on January 31, 1877.	Frank Hereford (D)	January 31, 1877

=== House of Representatives ===
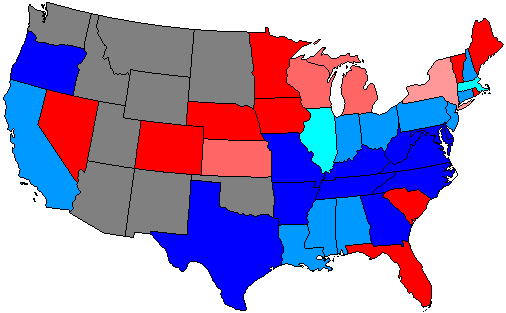
House seats by party holding plurality in state: 80+% Democratic / 80+% Republican; 60+ to 80% Democratic / 60+ to 80% Republican; Up to 60% Democratic / Up to 60% Republican

- Replacements: 14
  - Democratic: no net change
  - Republican: no net change
- Deaths: 9
- Resignations: 6
- Contested election: 5
- Seats of newly admitted states: 1
- Total seats with changes: 21

House changes
District	Vacated by	Reason for change	Successor	Date of successor's formal installation
Georgia 9	Vacant	Rep-elect Garnett McMillan died before taking seat	Benjamin H. Hill (D)	May 5, 1875
Maine 4	Vacant	Rep. Samuel F. Hersey died during previous congress	Harris M. Plaisted (R)	September 13, 1875
New York 33	Vacant	Rep.-elect Augustus F. Allen died before taking seat	Nelson I. Norton (R)	December 6, 1875
Massachusetts 1	James Buffington (R)	Died March 7, 1875	William W. Crapo (R)	November 2, 1875
Oregon at-large	George A. La Dow (D)	Died May 1, 1875	Lafayette Lane (D)	October 25, 1875
Tennessee 4	Samuel M. Fite (D)	Died October 23, 1875	Haywood Y. Riddle (D)	December 14, 1875
Connecticut 3	Henry H. Starkweather (R)	Died January 28, 1876	John T. Wait (R)	April 12, 1876
Florida 2	Josiah T. Walls (R)	Lost contested election April 19, 1876	Jesse J. Finley (D)	April 19, 1876
Illinois 3	Charles B. Farwell (R)	Lost contested election May 6, 1876	John V. Le Moyne (D)	May 6, 1876
Connecticut 4	William H. Barnum (D)	Resigned May 18, 1876, after being elected to the US Senate	Levi Warner (D)	December 4, 1876
Louisiana 5	Frank Morey (R)	Lost contested election June 8, 1876	William B. Spencer (D)	June 8, 1876
Idaho Territory at-large	Thomas W. Bennett (I)	Lost contested election June 23, 1876	Stephen S. Fenn (D)	June 23, 1876
Maine 3	James G. Blaine (R)	Resigned July 10, 1876, after being appointed to the US Senate	Edwin Flye (R)	December 4, 1876
Kentucky 5	Edward Y. Parsons (D)	Died July 8, 1876	Henry Watterson (D)	August 12, 1876
Pennsylvania 12	Winthrop W. Ketcham (R)	Resigned July 19, 1876, after being appointed judge to the United States District Court for the Western District of Pennsylvania	William H. Stanton (D)	November 7, 1876
South Carolina 2	Edmund W. M. Mackey (IR)	Seat declared vacant July 19, 1876	Charles W. Buttz (R)	November 7, 1876
Massachusetts 4	Rufus S. Frost (R)	Lost contested election July 28, 1876	Josiah G. Abbott (D)	July 28, 1876
Colorado Territory at-large	Thomas M. Patterson (D)	Colorado admitted to the Union August 1, 1876	Statehood achieved	
Colorado at-large	New seat	Colorado admitted to the Union August 1, 1876. Seat remained vacant until October 3, 1876.	James B. Belford (R)	October 3, 1876
Indiana 3	Michael C. Kerr (D)	Died August 19, 1876	Nathan T. Carr (D)	December 15, 1876
Indiana 2	James D. Williams (D)	Resigned December 1, 1876, after being elected Governor of Indiana	Andrew Humphreys (D)	December 5, 1876
New York 7	Smith Ely Jr. (D)	Resigned December 11, 1876	David D. Field II (D)	January 11, 1877
Louisiana 5	William B. Spencer (D)	Resigned January 8, 1877, to become an associate justice of the Louisiana Supreme Court	Vacant	Not filled this term
West Virginia 3	Frank Hereford (D)	Resigned January 31, 1877, after being elected to the US Senate	Vacant	Not filled this term
Georgia 9	Benjamin H. Hill (D)	Resigned March 3, 1877, after being elected to the US Senate	Vacant	Not filled this term

== Committees ==
Lists of committees and their party leaders for members of the House and Senate committees can be found through the Official Congressional Directory at the bottom of this article. The directory after the pages of terms of service lists committees of the Senate, House (Standing with Subcommittees, Select and Special) and Joint and, after that, House/Senate committee assignments. On the committees section of the House and Senate in the Official Congressional Directory, the committee's members on the first row on the left side shows the chairman of the committee and on the right side shows the ranking member of the committee.

=== Senate ===
- Agriculture (Chairman: Frederick T. Frelinghuysen; Ranking Member: Henry G. Davis)
- Appropriations (Chairman: William Windom; Ranking Member: Stephen W. Dorsey)
- Audit and Control the Contingent Expenses of the Senate (Chairman: John P. Jones; Ranking Member: George R. Dennis)
- Civil Service and Retrenchment (Chairman: Thomas F. Bayard; Ranking Member: John J. Patterson)
- Claims (Chairman: George G. Wright; Ranking Member: Samuel J.R. McMillan)
- Commerce (Chairman: Roscoe Conkling; Ranking Member: Samuel J.R. McMillan)
- Counting the Electoral Vote (Select)
- Distributing Public Revenue Among the States (Select)
- District of Columbia (Chairman: George E. Spencer; Ranking Member: Thomas J. Robertson)
- Education and Labor (Chairman: John J. Patterson; Ranking Member: William Sharon)
- Engrossed Bills (Chairman: Thomas F. Bayard; Ranking Member: Henry B. Anthony)
- Enrolled Bills
- Examine the Several Branches in the Civil Service (Select) (Chairman: James M. Harvey; Ranking Member: Augustus S. Merrimon)
- Finance (Chairman: John Sherman; Ranking Member: John P. Jones)
- Foreign Relations (Chairman: Simon Cameron; Ranking Member: Roscoe Conkling)
- Indian Affairs (Chairman: William B. Allison; Ranking Member: Powell Clayton)
- Judiciary (Chairman: George F. Edmunds; Ranking Member: Timothy O. Howe)
- Manufactures (Chairman: Thomas J. Robertson; Ranking Member: William A. Wallace)
- Military Affairs (Chairman: John A. Logan; Ranking Member: Ambrose E. Burnside)
- Mines and Mining (Chairman: Aaron A. Sargent; Ranking Member: William Sharon)
- Mississippi River Levee System (Select) (Chairman: James L. Alcorn; Ranking Member: Henry Cooper)
- Mississippi Election Frauds, 1876 (Chairman: George S. Boutwell; Ranking Member: Joseph E. McDonald)
- Naval Affairs (Chairman: Aaron H. Cragin; Ranking Member: Simon B. Conover)
- Ordnance and War Ships (Select)
- Patents (Chairman: Bainbridge Wadleigh; Ranking Member: John W. Johnston)
- Pensions (Chairman: John J. Ingalls; Ranking Member: Blanche Bruce)
- Post Office and Post Roads (Chairman: Hannibal Hamlin; Ranking Member: Algernon S. Paddock)
- Private Land Claims (Chairman: Allen G. Thurman; Ranking Member: George F. Edmunds)
- Privileges and Elections (Chairman: Oliver P. Morton; Ranking Member: Samuel J.R. McMillan)
- Public Buildings and Grounds (Chairman: Justin S. Morrill; Ranking Member: Newton Booth)
- Public Lands (Chairman: Richard J. Oglesby; Ranking Member: Newton Booth)
- Railroads (Chairman: Joseph R. West; Ranking Member: John H. Mitchell)
- Revision of the Laws (Chairman: George S. Boutwell; Ranking Member: Isaac P. Christiancy)
- Revolutionary Claims (Chairman: John W. Stevenson; Ranking Member: George G. Wright)
- Rules (Chairman: Thomas W. Ferry; Ranking Member: Augustus S. Merrimon)
- Tariff Regulation (Select)
- Territories (Chairman: Phineas W. Hitchcock; Ranking Member: William Sharon)
- Transportation Routes to the Seaboard (Select)
- Whole

=== House of Representatives ===
- Accounts (Chairman: Charles B. Roberts; Ranking Member: George G. Hoskins)
- Agriculture (Chairman: John H. Caldwell; Ranking Member: William B. Anderson)
- Appropriations (Chairman: William S. Holman; Ranking Member: William A. Wheeler)
- Banking and Currency (Chairman: Samuel S. Cox; Ranking Member: Scott Wike)
- Claims (Chairman: John M. Bright; Ranking Member: John F. Philips)
- Coinage, Weights and Measures (Chairman: Alexander H. Stephens; Ranking Member: Levi Maish)
- Commerce (Chairman: Elijah Ward; Ranking Member: Henry Myer Phillips)
- District of Columbia (Chairman: Aylett H. Buckner; Ranking Member: George Willard)
- Education and Labor (Chairman: Gilbert C. Walker; Ranking Member: William M. Springer)
- Elections (Chairman: John T. Harris; Ranking Member: Earley F. Poppleton)
- Enrolled Bills
- Expenditures in the Interior Department (Chairman: William Mutchler; Ranking Member: Laurin D. Woodworth)
- Expenditures in the Justice Department (Chairman: Bernard G. Caulfield; Ranking Member: Edwin R. Meade)
- Expenditures in the Navy Department (Chairman: George M. Beebe; Ranking Member: John H. Burleigh)
- Expenditures in the Post Office Department (Chairman: William H. Stone; Ranking Member: William H.H. Stowell)
- Expenditures in the State Department (Chairman: William M. Springer; Ranking Member: John W. Wallace)
- Expenditures in the Treasury Department (Chairman: John M. Bright; Ranking Member: John S. Savage)
- Expenditures in the War Department (Chairman: John Robbins; Ranking Member: Lyman K. Bass)
- Expenditures on Public Buildings (Chairman: Henry B. Metcalfe; Ranking Member: Samuel N. Bell)
- Foreign Affairs (Chairman: Thomas Swann; Ranking Member: William H. Forney)
- Indian Affairs (Chairman: Alfred M. Scales; Ranking Member: Lafayette Lane)
- Invalid Pensions (Chairman: George A. Jenks; Ranking Member: Jesse J. Yeates)
- Judiciary (Chairman: J. Proctor Knott; Ranking Member: Bernard G. Caulfield)
- Manufactures (Chairman: William H. Stone; Ranking Member: Samuel D. Burchard)
- Mileage (Chairman: Albert G. Egbert; Ranking Member: Nathaniel H. Odell)
- Military Affairs (Chairman: Henry B. Banning; Ranking Member: Augustus A. Hardenbergh)
- Militia (Chairman: Jacob P. Cowan; Ranking Member: John K. Tarbox)
- Mines and Mining (Chairman: Richard P. Bland; Ranking Member: Alexander Campbell)
- Mississippi Levees (Chairman: E. John Ellis; Ranking Member: James Sheakley)
- Naval Affairs (Chairman: Washington C. Whitthorne; Ranking Member: John Robbins)
- Pacific Railroads (Chairman: Lucius Quintus Cincinnatus Lamar II; Ranking Member: John F. Philips)
- Patents (Chairman: Robert B. Vance; Ranking Member: William E. Smith)
- Post Office and Post Roads (Chairman: John B. Clark Jr.; Ranking Member: William F. Slemons)
- Private Land Claims (Chairman: Thomas M. Gunter; Ranking Member: Lucien L. Ainsworth)
- Public Buildings and Grounds (Chairman: William S. Holman; Ranking Member: Casey Young)
- Public Expenditures (Chairman: Charles W. Milliken; Ranking Member: Alexander Campbell)
- Public Lands (Chairman: Milton Sayler; Ranking Member: Lafayette Lane)
- Railways and Canals (Chairman: Thomas L. Jones; Ranking Member: Levi A. Mackey)
- Reform in the Civil Service (Chairman: John O. Whitehouse; Ranking Member: Augustus W. Cutler)
- Revision of Laws (Chairman: Milton J. Durham; Ranking Member: Milton J. Durham)
- Revolutionary Pensions and War of 1812 (Chairman: Eppa Hunton; Ranking Member: John G. Schumaker)
- Rules (Select) (Chairman: Michael C. Kerr; Ranking Member: James G. Blaine)
- Standards of Official Conduct
- Territories (Chairman: Milton I. Southard; Ranking Member: Peter D. Wigginton)
- War Claims (Chairman: John R. Eden; Ranking Member: John H. Caldwell)
- Ways and Means (Chairman: William R. Morrison; Ranking Member: James G. Blaine)
- Whole

=== Joint committees ===
- Conditions of Indian Tribes (Special)
- Enrolled Bills (Chairman: Rep. Henry R. Harris; Vice Chairman: Rep. Harris M. Plaisted)
- Frame a Form of Government for the District of Columbia
- Investigate Chinese Immigration
- The Library (Chairman: Rep. Hiester Clymer; Vice Chairman: Rep. James Monroe)
- Printing (Chairman: Rep. John L. Vance; Vice Chairmam: Rep. Latimer W. Ballou)

== Caucuses ==
- Democratic (House)
- Democratic (Senate)

== Employees ==
=== Legislative branch agency directors ===
- Architect of the Capitol: Edward Clark
- Librarian of Congress: Ainsworth Rand Spofford
- Public Printer of the United States: Almon M. Clapp, from 1876

=== Senate ===
- Chaplain: Byron Sunderland (Presbyterian)
- Librarian: George F. Dawson
- Secretary: George C. Gorham
- Sergeant at Arms: John R. French

=== House of Representatives ===
- Chaplain: John George Butler (Lutheran), until December 6, 1875
  - I. L. Townsend (Episcopalian), from December 6, 1875
- Clerk: Edward McPherson, until December 6, 1875
  - George M. Adams, elected December 6, 1875
- Clerk at the Speaker’s Table: William H. Scudder
- Doorkeeper: Lafayette H. Fitzhugh
- Postmaster: James M. Steuart
- Reading Clerks: Thomas S. Pettit (D) and Neill S. Brown Jr. (R)
- Sergeant at Arms: Nehemiah G. Ordway, until December 6, 1875
  - John G. Thompson, elected December 6, 1875

== See also ==
- 1874 United States elections (elections leading to this Congress)
  - 1874–75 United States Senate elections
  - 1874–75 United States House of Representatives elections
- 1876 United States elections (elections during this Congress, leading to the next Congress)
  - 1876 United States presidential election
  - 1876–77 United States Senate elections
  - 1876–77 United States House of Representatives elections
