= Haywood Yancey Riddle =

American politician (1834–1879)

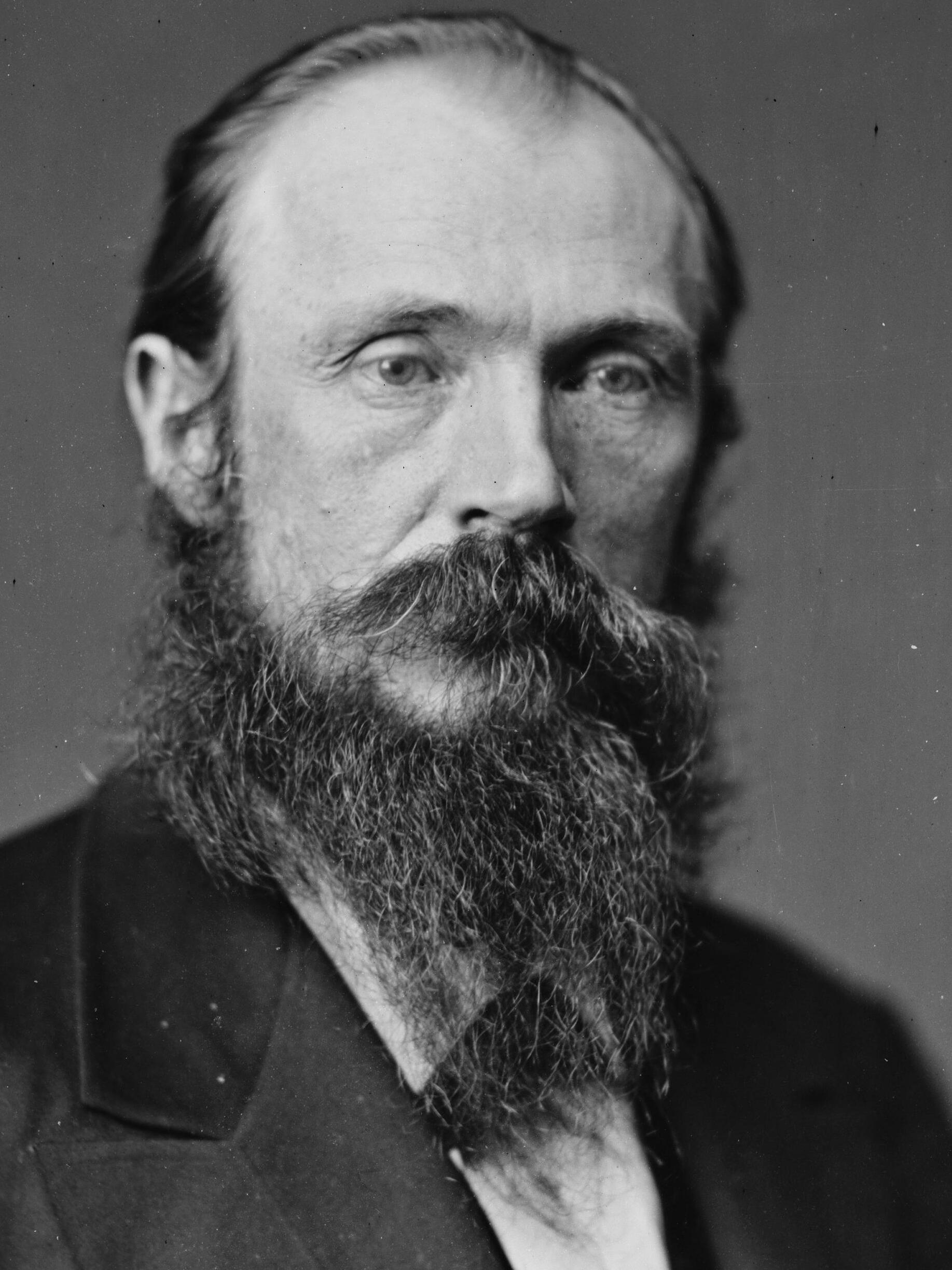

Member of the U.S. House of Representatives from Tennessee's 4th district
- In office December 14, 1875 – March 3, 1879
- Preceded by: Samuel McClary Fite
- Succeeded by: Benton McMillin

Personal details
- Born: June 20, 1834 Van Buren, Tennessee, U.S.
- Died: March 28, 1879 (aged 44) Lebanon, Tennessee, U.S.
- Party: Democratic
- Children: 4
- Education: Union University (BA); Cumberland University (LLB)

Haywood Yancey Riddle (June 20, 1834 – March 28, 1879) was an American politician, attorney, and educator who served as a member of the United States House of Representatives from Tennessee's 4th congressional district.

== Early life and education ==
Riddle was born in Van Buren, Tennessee, the son of Wylie Jones and Ruth Bowers Riddle. He completed preparatory studies and graduated from Union University in Murfreesboro, Tennessee in 1854.

== Career ==
He was an adjunct professor of mathematics and languages at Union University. He graduated from Cumberland School of Law at Cumberland University in Lebanon, Tennessee in 1857 and was admitted to the bar in Ripley, Mississippi the same year.

When Riddle moved to Smith County, Tennessee in 1858, he engaged in agricultural pursuits. He enlisted in the Confederate Army as a private in 1861 and served throughout the war. In the last year, he was on the staffs of Brigadier Generals Wright and Mackall.

Riddle moved to Lebanon, Tennessee, in Wilson County in 1865 to practice law, but he was employed as a deputy clerk in the chancery clerk's office for five years. He was appointed clerk for a term of six years in 1870 and served until December 20, 1875.

Elected as a Democrat to the Forty-fourth Congress to fill the vacancy caused by the death of Samuel M. Fite, Riddle was then re-elected to the Forty-fifth Congress and served from December 14, 1875, to March 3, 1879.

== Personal life ==
He married Martha G. Skelton and they had four children, Haywood Yancy Jr., Henry Shelton, Jennie Wren, and Rubie.

Riddle died in Lebanon, Tennessee, on March 28, 1879, and is interred at Cedar Grove Cemetery.

U.S. House of Representatives
Preceded by Samuel M. Fite	Member of the U.S. House of Representatives from Tennessee's 4th congressional district December 14, 1875 - March 3, 1879	Succeeded by Benton McMillin
