= William Lair Hill =

American attorney, historian and newspaper editor (1838–1924)

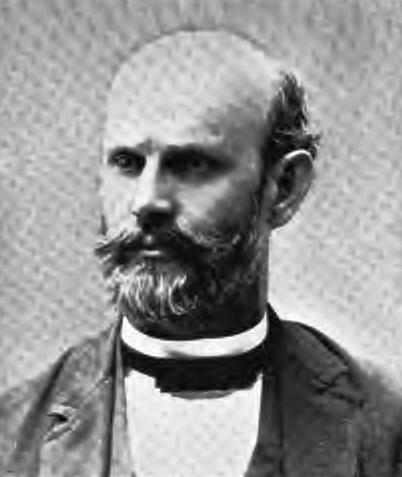

Judge of Grant County, Oregon
- In office 1864–1866

Personal details
- Born: August 20, 1838 McNairy County, Tennessee
- Died: February 24, 1924 (aged 85) Oakland, California
- Spouse: Julia Hall Chandler
- Education: McMinnville College

William Lair Hill (August 20, 1838 – February 24, 1924), also referred to as W. Lair Hill, was an American attorney, historian, and newspaper editor in Portland, Oregon. He worked to codify Oregon's and Washington's laws. He briefly owned property in the Portland neighborhood later named after him, Lair Hill, and is the namesake of Lair Hill Park.

== Early life ==
William Hill was born on August 20, 1838, to Reuben Coleman and Margaret Graham (née Lair) Hill in Tennessee. His father was a doctor and Baptist preacher at their home along the Tennessee River in the southwestern portion of the state. The home in McNairy County was near the site of the 1862 Battle of Shiloh. In 1853, he moved to the Oregon Territory with his parents, with the family settling in Benton County in the Willamette Valley.

In Oregon, Hill attended local schools and the Jefferson Institute before finishing his education at McMinnville College (now Linfield College) in McMinnville, a school that his father helped found. While attending college from 1857 to 1859, he met the daughter of the school president, Julia Hall Chandler, whom he later married. After college he began teaching in McMinnville before reading law at the law firm of George Henry Williams and A. C. Gibbs. Hill was admitted to the bar in Oregon in December 1861.

== Career ==
After becoming a lawyer, he moved to Eastern Oregon where he served in the army during the American Civil War, working as a paymaster stationed in Oregon. From 1864 to 1866, he served as the judge for Grant County. On April 23, 1865, he married Julia Hall Chandler in Canyon City. The couple had four children. He worked as a newspaper editor for the Daily Union and the Daily Times.

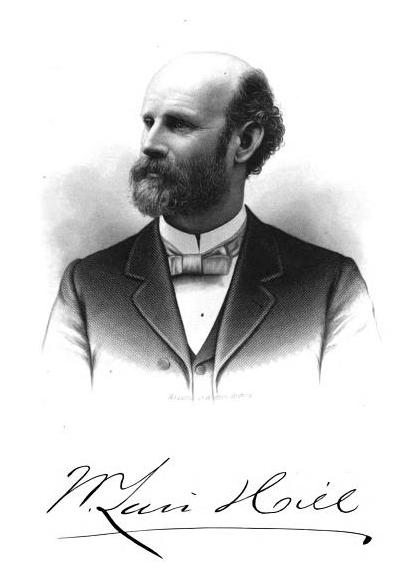
Hill in about 1890

Hill moved west to Portland in 1866 where he practiced law. There he also became the editor of the city's main newspaper, The Oregonian, in October 1872. He remained as editor until 1877 when Harvey Scott returned to the paper. He was offered appointments to the Supreme Court of the Washington Territory in 1870 and later to the Supreme Court of Idaho Territory, but declined the positions. Hill then moved to The Dalles after his time as editor in hopes of improving his health. There he helped run the Wasco Academy. In 1886, he codified Oregon's laws under authority of the Oregon Legislative Assembly, and then moved to Seattle, Washington, in 1889 where he codified that state's laws. During his legal career he had partnerships with Richard Williams, Marion Francis Mulkey, George Hannibal Durham, H. Y. Thompson, and W. W. Thayer among others.

== Later years ==
Hill served as a director of the new Columbia River Railway & Navigation Company in 1892. After a time in Seattle he moved south to Oakland, California, where he continued to practice law. William Lair Hill died there at the age of 83 on February 24, 1924.

== Books authored ==
- The codes and general laws of Oregon, Volume 1. Published by authority of statute of February 26, 1885. February 26, 1885.
