= Frederick A. Sawyer =

American politician

Frederick Adolphus Sawyer
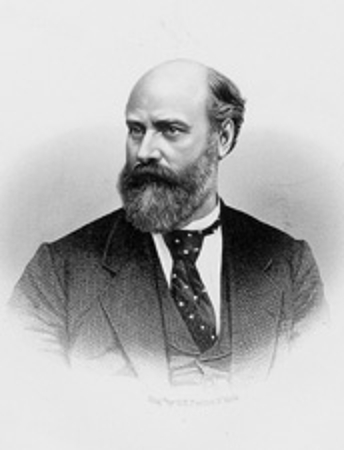

United States Senator from South Carolina
- In office July 16, 1868 – March 4, 1873
- Preceded by: James H. Hammond
- Succeeded by: John J. Patterson

Personal details
- Born: December 12, 1822 Bolton, Massachusetts, U.S.
- Died: July 31, 1891 (aged 68) Claiborne County, Tennessee, U.S.
- Party: Republican

Frederick Adolphus Sawyer (December 12, 1822 – July 31, 1891) was a United States senator from South Carolina. Born in Bolton, Massachusetts, he attended the public schools, graduated from Harvard University in 1844, taught school in New England from 1844 to 1859, and took charge of the state's normal school at Charleston, South Carolina in 1859. He returned to the North during the Civil War, and returned to Charleston in February 1865 where he was active in advancing Reconstruction measures. On the night of April 14, 1865, Sawyer was at Ford's Theater in Washington, D.C., and witnessed the assassination of President Abraham Lincoln. He was appointed collector of internal revenue in the second South Carolina district in 1865, and upon the readmission of the State of South Carolina to representation, Sawyer was elected as a Republican to the U.S. Senate, serving from July 16, 1868, to March 4, 1873. While in the Senate, he was chairman of the Committee on Education (Forty-first Congress) and a member of the Committee on Education and Labor (Forty-second Congress).

Sawyer was Assistant Secretary of the Treasury under William Adams Richardson from 1873 to 1874 and was employed in the United States Coast Survey from 1874 to 1880. From 1880 to 1887, he was special agent of the War Department. He conducted a preparatory school in Ithaca, New York, and gave private instruction to students in Cornell University. In 1889 he moved to Tennessee and became president of a land development company at Cumberland Gap, which laid out the new city of Shawanee (now part of Harrogate, Tennessee).

Frederick Sawyer and his wife, Delia, had two daughters who both married into prominent political families. Their elder daughter, Myra, married Charles Eugene Hamlin, grandson of Vice President Hannibal Hamlin. Myra Sawyer Hamlin wrote a series of books for girls, and her husband was editor of a weekly magazine for school teachers and a music critic for the New-York Tribune.

Sawyer's younger daughter, Clara, married Isaiah Kidder Stetson, grand-nephew of Hannibal Hamlin and nephew of U.S. Congressman Charles Stetson. Isaiah K. Stetson owned a lumber and shipbuilding company in Bangor, Maine, and served as Speaker of the Maine House of Representatives in 1899–1900.

Sawyer died suddenly at Shawanee, Tennessee, in 1891; interment was in "Sawyer Heights", on the property of his land company, near East Cumberland Gap.

U.S. Senate
Preceded by vacant^{a}	U.S. senator (Class 3) from South Carolina; 1868–1873; Served alongside: Thomas J. Robertson	Succeeded by John J. Patterson
Notes and references
1. Because of South Carolina's secession in 1860, seat was declared vacant from 1860 to 1868 when James H. Hammond withdrew from the Senate.
