= Lair Hill Park =

Public park in Portland, Oregon, U.S.

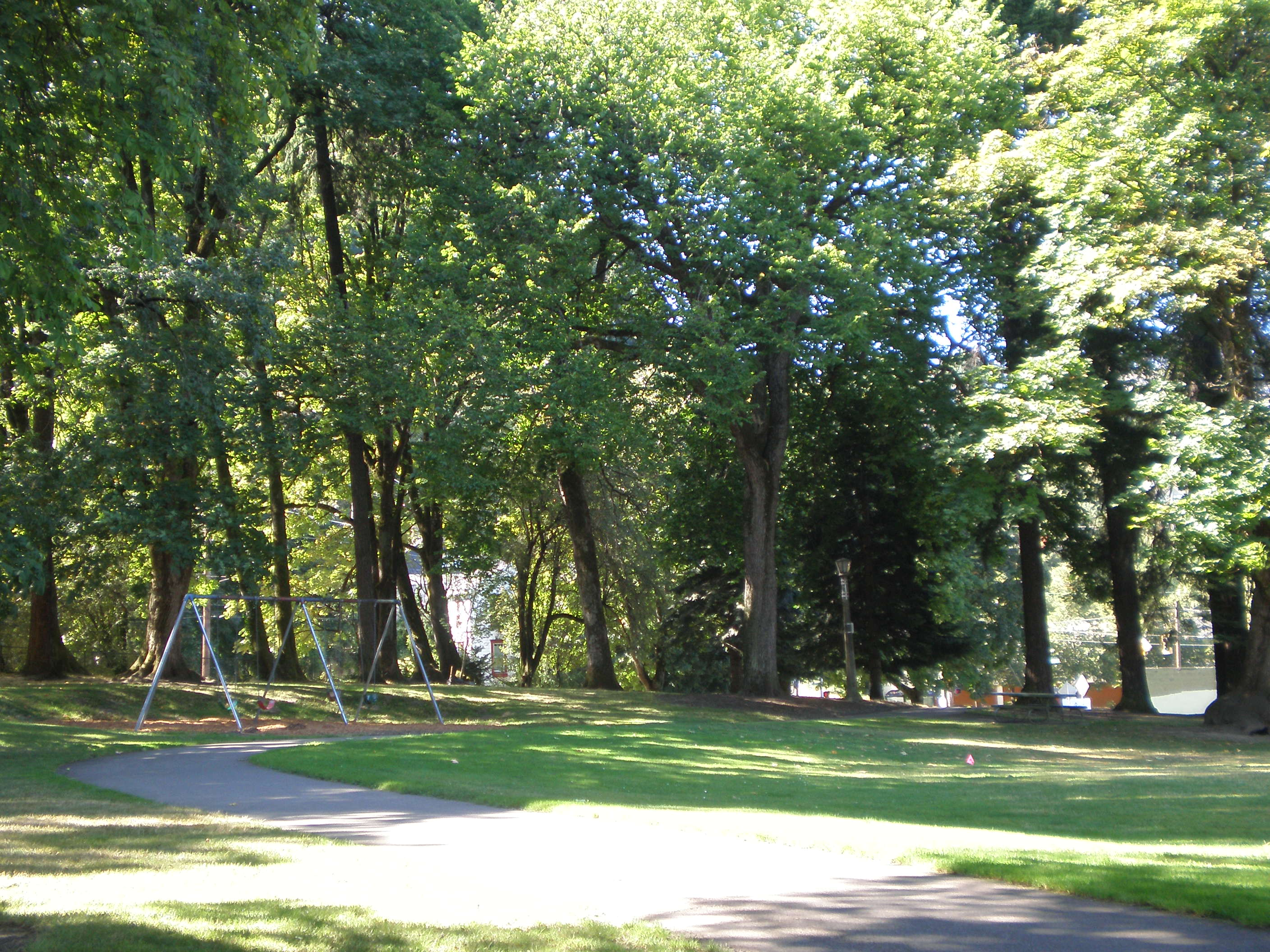
- Part of the park in 2010

- Location within Portland, Oregon
- Location: SW 2nd Ave. and Woods St. Portland, Oregon
- Coordinates: 45°30′6″N 122°40′50″W
- Area: 3.26 acres (1.32 ha)
- Operator: Portland Parks & Recreation

Lair Hill Park is a 3.26-acre (1.32 ha) public park in southwest Portland, Oregon. The space was acquired in 1927. It features a 1978 sculpture by Bruce West called BW1.

The park is named for William Lair Hill.
