= Charles St. John =

American politician

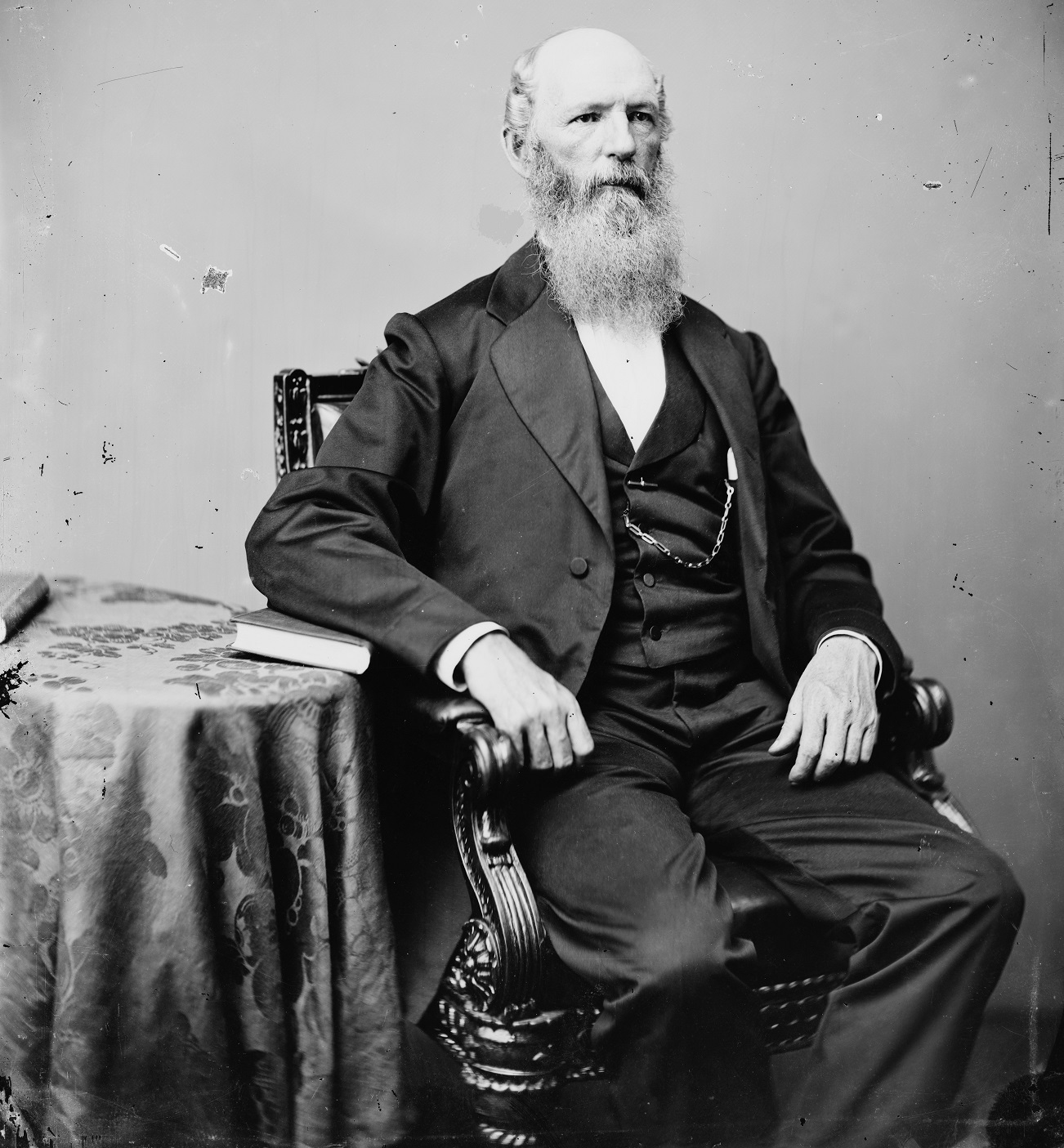
- h.r.6201

Member of the U.S. House of Representatives from New York
- In office March 4, 1871 – March 3, 1875
- Preceded by: Charles Van Wyck
- Succeeded by: Nathaniel H. Odell
- Constituency: 11th district (1871–73); 12th district (1875–75)

Personal details
- Born: October 8, 1818 Mount Hope, New York, U.S.0LB
- Died: July 6, 1891 (aged 72) Port Jervis, New York, U.S.
- Resting place: Laurel Grove Cemetery, Port Jervis, New York, U.S.OLB
- Party: Republican

Charles St. John (October 8, 1818 – July 6, 1891) was a representative in the US House of Representatives from New York.

== Biography ==
St. John was born on October 8, 1818, in Mount Hope, New York. He attended the common schools and Goshen and Newburgh (New York) Academies. He engaged in lumbering on the Delaware River and in mercantile pursuits and banking at Port Jervis, New York. He served as internal revenue collector and later as president of the Barrett Bridge Co..

St. John was elected as a Republican to the Forty-second and Forty-third Congresses (March 4, 1871 – March 3, 1875), after which he resumed his former business activities.

He died in Port Jervis on July 6, 1891, and was interred in Laurel Grove Cemetery.

== Legacy ==
In 1888 St. John built the High Point Inn at New Jersey's highest point High Point, New Jersey. The Inn would form the basis for the home of Anthony R. Kuser who converted it into a lodge before ultimately donating it to New Jersey in 1923.

U.S. House of Representatives
Preceded by Charles Van Wyck	Member of the U.S. House of Representatives from New York's 11th congressional district 1871–1873	Succeeded by Clarkson N. Potter
Preceded by John H. Ketcham	Member of the U.S. House of Representatives from New York's 12th congressional district 1873–1875	Succeeded by N. Holmes Odell
