= Richard Williams (Oregon politician) =

American lawyer and politician (1836–1914)

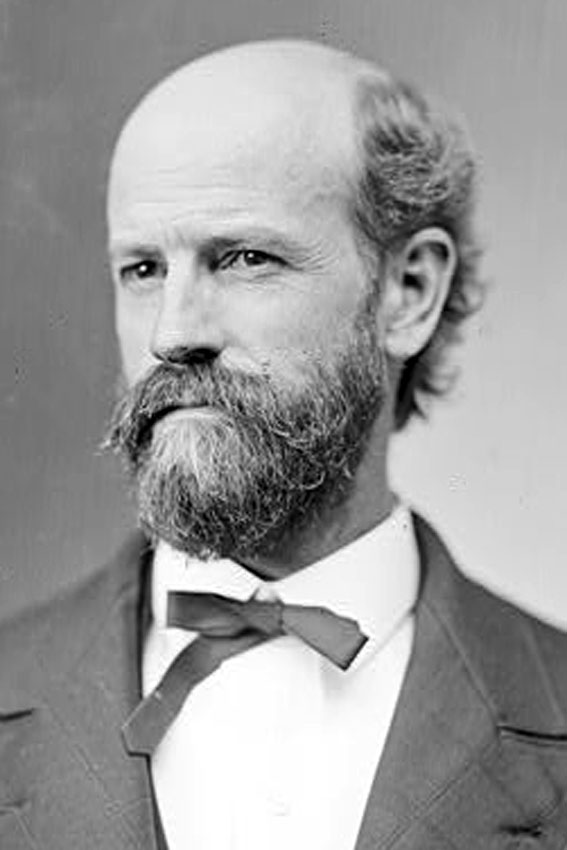

Member of the U.S. House of Representatives from Oregon's At-large district
- In office March 4, 1877 – March 3, 1879
- Preceded by: Lafayette Lane
- Succeeded by: John Whiteaker

Personal details
- Born: November 15, 1836 Findlay, Ohio
- Died: June 19, 1914 (aged 77) Portland, Oregon
- Party: Republican

Richard Williams (November 15, 1836 – June 19, 1914) was an American lawyer and politician in the state of Oregon. A native of Ohio, he moved to Oregon in 1851 where he became an attorney. A Republican, he was the United States Congressman representing Oregon's at large congressional district for one term from 1877 to 1879.

== Early life ==
Williams was born in Findlay, Ohio to Elijah Williams. In Ohio he attended the public schools before the family moved to Oregon in 1851 over the Oregon Trail. The family first settled in Milwaukie, Oregon, and then Salem where he was educated in the local schools. He also attended Willamette University in Salem, and was admitted to the bar in 1857.

Richard Williams then moved to San Francisco, California in 1857 and began practicing law. The following year he returned to Oregon and practiced law in Kerbyville in Josephine County, followed by Corvallis in 1860, and Salem in 1862. In 1862 he married Clara J. Congle, and they had one daughter. He partnered with Rufus Mallory and Parish L. Willis while practicing law in Salem. The family moved to Portland in 1872. There he partnered with Lair Hill and later governor William Wallace Thayer.

== Political career ==
Williams ran as a Republican for Congress in 1874. He faced Democrat George A. La Dow and, due to a split in the Republican party, also faced Timothy W. Davenport, who ran as an Independent. Davenport, one of the founders of the Oregon Republican party, and father of political cartoonist Homer Davenport, debated Williams throughout the state, with the result that the Republican vote was split and La Dow won the election by a narrow plurality. He ran again in 1876, and was elected, defeating incumbent Lafayette Lane, though the election was contested by Samuel McDowell. Williams prevailed and served one term from 1877 to 1879.

== Later years ==
After his one term in Congress, Williams resumed his law practice in Portland and served on the Portland School Board for 20 years beginning in 1890. Williams partnered with Willis a second time for one year in 1885 before practicing law with his brother E. B. Williams. He died in Portland in 1914 and was buried at River View Cemetery in Portland.

U.S. House of Representatives
Preceded by Lafayette Lane	Member of the U.S. House of Representatives from Oregon's at-large congressional district 1877–1879	Succeeded by John Whiteaker
