= John Berry (Ohio politician) =

American politician (1833–1879)

Member of the U.S. House of Representatives from Ohio's 14th district
- In office March 4, 1873 – March 3, 1875
- Preceded by: James Monroe
- Succeeded by: Jacob Pitzer Cowan

Personal details
- Born: April 26, 1833 Carey, Ohio, U.S.
- Died: May 18, 1879 (aged 46) Upper Sandusky, Ohio, U.S.
- Resting place: Oak Hill Cemetery
- Party: Democratic
- Education: Ohio Wesleyan University; Cincinnati Law School

John Berry (April 26, 1833 – May 18, 1879) was an American lawyer and politician who served one term as a U.S. representative from Ohio from 1873 to 1875.

== Life and career ==
Born near Carey, in that portion of Crawford County which is now Wyandot County, Ohio, Berry attended public schools and Ohio Wesleyan University at Delaware. He graduated from the law department of Cincinnati College, in 1857. He was admitted to the bar in April 1857, and commenced practice in Upper Sandusky, Ohio.

Berry was elected prosecuting attorney of Wyandot County in 1862. He was reelected in 1864. He served as mayor of Upper Sandusky in 1864. His son, Junius, died as an infant in July of that year.

== Congress and later career ==
Berry was elected as a Democrat to the Forty-third Congress (March 4, 1873 – March 4, 1875). He declined to be a candidate for renomination in 1874. He resumed the practice of law in Upper Sandusky, Ohio, where he died May 18, 1879. He was interred in Oak Hill Cemetery, near Upper Sandusky, Ohio.

== Sources ==
- United States Congress. "John Berry (id: B000419)". Biographical Directory of the United States Congress.

U.S. House of Representatives
| Preceded by James Monroe | Member of the U.S. House of Representatives from Ohio's 14th congressional district 1873-1875 | Succeeded by Jacob P. Cowan |
