= Van Buren, Tennessee =

Unincorporated community in Tennessee, US

Coordinates: 35°07′53″N 89°04′31″W

Van Buren is an unincorporated community in west-central Hardeman County, Tennessee, United States. it shares a ZIP code 38042 with Hickory Valley. Van Buren's exact location is at the intersection of Van Buren Road and Lake Hardeman Road in Hardeman County.
