= Jacob Pitzer Cowan =

American politician

Jacob P. Cowan
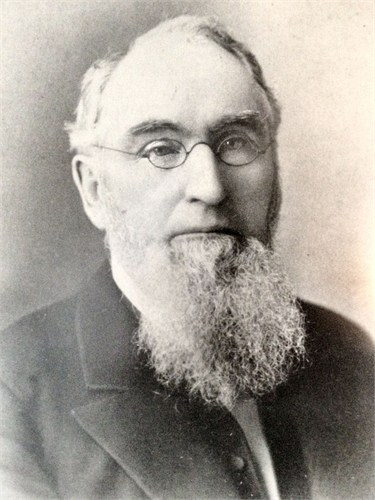

Member of the U.S. House of Representatives from Ohio's 14th district
- In office March 4, 1875 – March 3, 1877
- Preceded by: John Berry
- Succeeded by: Ebenezer B. Finley

Personal details
- Born: Jacob Pitzer Cowan; March 20, 1823 Washington County, Pennsylvania, US
- Died: July 9, 1895 (aged 72) Ashland, Ohio, US
- Resting place: Ashland Cemetery
- Party: Democratic
- Education: Starling Medical College

Jacob Pitzer Cowan (March 20, 1823 – July 9, 1895) was an American physician and politician who served one term as a U.S. representative from Ohio from 1875 to 1877.

== Biography ==
Born in Florence, Washington County, Pennsylvania Cowan attended the common schools. He moved with his parents to Steubenville, Ohio, in 1835. He engaged in the manufacture of woolens until 1843. He studied medicine.

=== Physician ===
In 1846 moved to Ashland County, Ohio, where he commenced the practice of his profession. He was graduated from Starling Medical College, Columbus, Ohio, March 6, 1855.

=== State legislature ===
He served as member of the State house of representatives 1855–1857. He resumed the practice of medicine in 1859.

=== Congress ===
Cowan was elected as a Democrat to the Forty-fourth Congress (March 4, 1875 – March 3, 1877). He served as chairman of the Committee on Militia (Forty-fourth Congress). He was an unsuccessful candidate for renomination in 1876.

=== Later career and death ===
He again engaged in the practice of medicine in Ashland, Ohio, where he died July 9, 1895.

He was interred in Ashland Cemetery.

== Sources ==
- United States Congress. "Jacob Pitzer Cowan (id: C000820)". Biographical Directory of the United States Congress.

U.S. House of Representatives
Preceded by John Berry	United States Representative from Ohio's 14th congressional district March 4, 1875-March 3, 1877	Succeeded by Ebenezer B. Finley
Ohio House of Representatives
Preceded by Richard D. Emerson	Representative from Ashland County; January 7, 1856-January 1, 1860	Succeeded by George McConnell, John Taylor
