= Samuel McClary Fite =

American politician (1816–1875)

Member of the U.S. House of Representatives from Tennessee's 4th district
- In office March 4, 1875 – October 23, 1875
- Preceded by: John M. Bright
- Succeeded by: Haywood Y. Riddle

Member of the Tennessee Senate
- In office 1852

Personal details
- Born: June 12, 1816 Smith County, Tennessee, US
- Died: October 23, 1875 (aged 59) Hot Springs, Arkansas, US
- Party: Democrat Whig
- Spouse: Catherine Isabella Wilson Fite
- Children: 3
- Education: Clinton College
- Profession: lawyer; judge; politician

Samuel McClary Fite (June 12, 1816 – October 23, 1875) was an American politician and a member of the United States House of Representatives for Tennessee's 4th congressional district.

== Biography ==
Samuel McClary Fite was born the son of Jacob and Matilda M. Fite on June 12, 1816 near Alexandria, Tennessee in Smith County. He attended the common and private schools and graduated from Clinton College in Tennessee. Fite studied law in Lebanon, was admitted to the bar, and commenced practice in Carthage, Tennessee. He married Catherine Isabella Wilson on September 5, 1855, and they had three daughters, Josephine Rowena, Catherine McClary, and Alberta Beard.

== Career ==
By 1850, Fite was a member of the Tennessee Senate. In 1852 at the age of 36, he was placed on the Whig ticket as a presidential elector. From 1858 to 1861, he was a judge of the sixth judicial district. Upon suspension of the court during the war, he resumed the practice of law in Carthage, Tennessee. He was appointed on July 24, 1869 to be the judge of the sixth judicial district to fill a vacancy. He was elected to the same position on January 8, 1870, and he served until 1874.

In 1875, Fite was elected as a Democrat to the Forty-fourth Congress to fill the vacancy caused by the death of John W. Head. He served from March 4, 1875 until his death, before the assembling of Congress.

== Death ==
Fite died at a sanitarium in Hot Springs, Arkansas on October 23, 1875, (age 59 years, 133 days) and was interred at Carthage Cemetery in Carthage, Tennessee. He was then reinterred at Mount Olivet Cemetery in Nashville, Tennessee in 1908.

== See also ==
- List of members of the United States Congress who died in office (1790–1899)

U.S. House of Representatives
Preceded by John M. Bright	Member of the U.S. House of Representatives from Tennessee's 4th congressional district March 4, 1875 - October 23, 1875	Succeeded by Haywood Y. Riddle
