= Nathaniel H. Odell =

American politician (1828–1904)

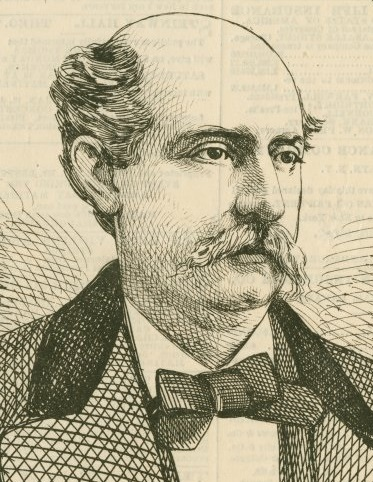

Member of the U.S. House of Representatives from New York's 12th district
- In office March 4, 1875 – March 3, 1877
- Preceded by: Charles St. John
- Succeeded by: Clarkson N. Potter

Personal details
- Born: Nathaniel Holmes Odell; October 10, 1828 Greenburgh, New York, U.S.
- Died: October 30, 1904 (aged 76) Tarrytown, New York, U.S.
- Resting place: Sleepy Hollow Cemetery
- Party: Democratic

Nathaniel Holmes Odell (October 10, 1828 – October 30, 1904) was an American businessman and politician who served one term as a U.S. Representative from New York from 1875 to 1877.

== Biography ==
N. Holmes Odell was born in Greenburgh, near Tarrytown, New York, and was the son of Jonathan S. Odell (1793–1887) and Jane Tompkins Odell (1796–1887). He attended private schools, including Paulding Institute, and then became a partner in the mercantile business of Odell & Clark while also becoming involved in his father's steamboat business on the North River.

=== Political career ===
Odell served in town offices, including Greenburgh town clerk and justice of the peace. He served in the New York State Assembly from 1857 to 1861. He established the First National Bank of Tarrytown and served as cashier from 1862 to 1864.

In 1866 Odell was elected Westchester County Treasurer. He was reelected in 1869 and again in 1872.

==== Congress ====
Odell was elected as a Democrat to the Forty-fourth Congress (March 4, 1875 – March 3, 1877). He was not a candidate for renomination in 1876.

=== Later career ===
After leaving Congress Odell resumed his banking interests and also became involved in the real estate business. After having served for several years as assistant postmaster, from 1887 to 1892 and 1894 to 1898 he served as postmaster of Tarrytown.

Odell was a Freemason and a member of Solomon's Lodge No. 196, Tarrytown.

=== Death ===
Odell died in Tarrytown, New York, October 30, 1904. He was interred at Sleepy Hollow Cemetery in Sleepy Hollow, New York.

== Sources ==
- United States Congress. "Nathaniel H. Odell (id: O000038)". Biographical Directory of the United States Congress.

U.S. House of Representatives
Preceded by Charles St. John	Member of the U.S. House of Representatives from New York's 12th congressional district 1875–1877	Succeeded by Clarkson N. Potter
