= John J. Patterson =

American businessman and politician (1830–1912)

John James Patterson
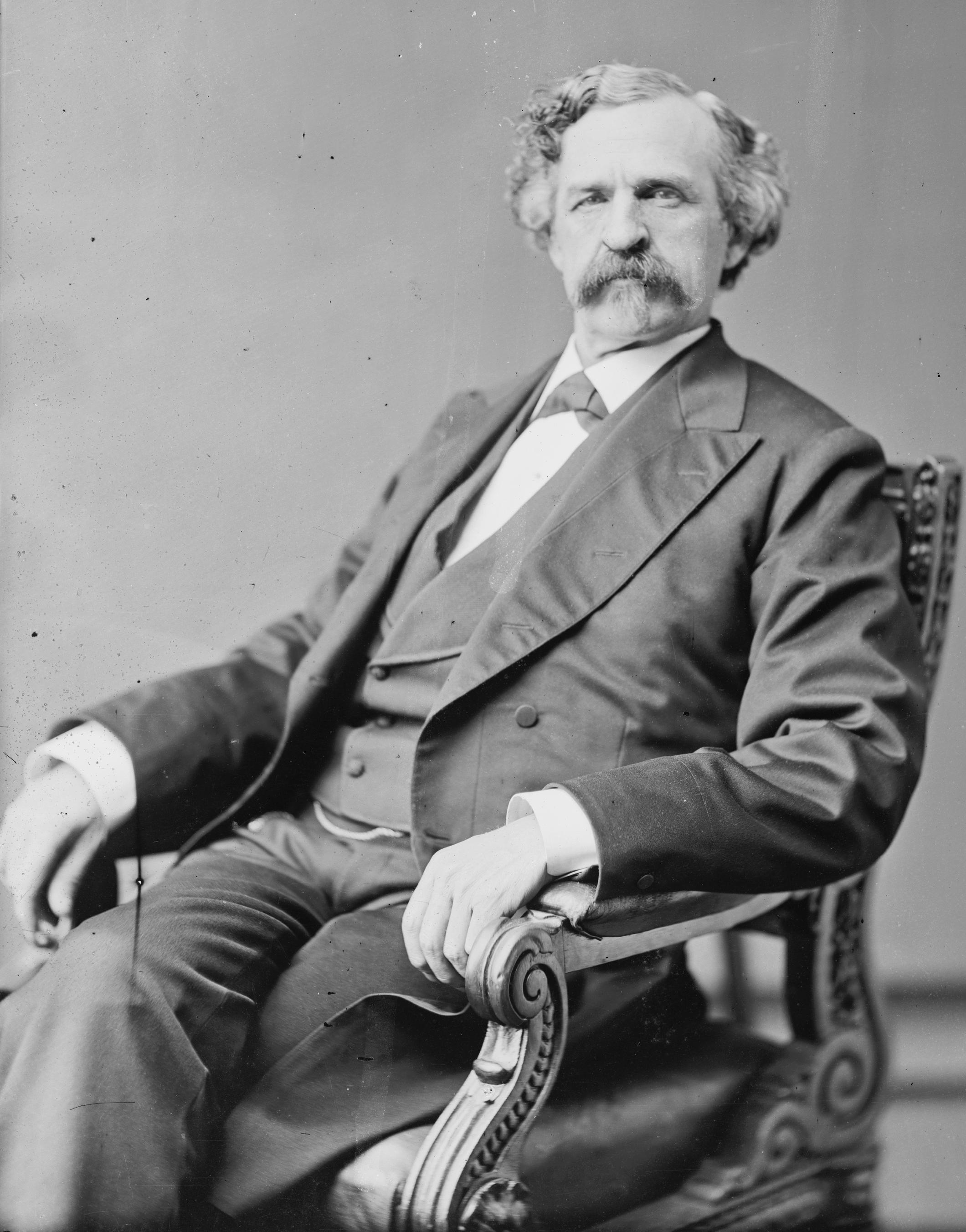

United States Senator from South Carolina
- In office March 4, 1873 – March 3, 1879
- Preceded by: Frederick A. Sawyer
- Succeeded by: Wade Hampton III

Member of the Pennsylvania House of Representatives from Juniata and Union Counties
- In office January 4, 1859 – January 1, 1861
- Preceded by: Thomas Bower
- Succeeded by: George W. Strouse

Personal details
- Born: August 8, 1830 Waterloo, Juniata County, Pennsylvania
- Died: September 28, 1912 (aged 82) Mifflintown, Pennsylvania
- Party: Republican

Military service
- Allegiance: United States of America
- Branch/service: United States Army
- Years of service: 1861–1865
- Rank: Captain
- Unit: Fifteenth U.S. (Regular) Infantry
- Battles/wars: American Civil War

John James "Honest John" Patterson (August 8, 1830 – September 28, 1912) was a businessman and United States Senator from South Carolina. He was a Republican.

== Biography ==
Born and raised in Waterloo, a populated place in Juniata County, Pennsylvania, Patterson attended public schools and then Jefferson College in Canonsburg. During the 1850s he engaged in newspaper and banking businesses in Pennsylvania; he published the Juniata Sentinel in 1852 and in 1853 became editor and part owner of the Harrisburg Telegraph in Harrisburg, the state capital. He first entered politics in 1859 when he was elected to the Pennsylvania House of Representatives, in which he served until 1861 when the Civil War began.

He joined the United States Army and served as a captain in the Fifteenth U.S. (regular) Infantry. He also ran for a seat in the United States House of Representatives in 1862, but lost.

After the war Patterson moved to Columbia, South Carolina, and engaged in railroad construction. He again entered politics and in 1873 was elected by the South Carolina Legislature to the U.S. Senate as a Republican.

He was criticized by the Ku Klux Klan in South Carolina for being a so-called "carpetbagger". (Note: According to one history of South Carolina published in 1920, concerning the 1872–74 term of Governor Franklin J. Moses, Jr., "the story is fairly well authenticated that John J. Patterson … in the midst of the Moses carnival of crime, boasted that 'there are still five years of good stealing in South Carolina'." The authors asserted that "Patterson controlled the most money and bought his way into [the Senate]" and that someone later testified he had stated it "cost him more than $40,000".) Patterson was the chairman of the Committee on Education and Labor from 1875 to 1877 and a member of the committee on territories from 1877 to 1879. He was known for speaking out against events such as the Hamburg Massacre and supporting the rights of African-Americans in South Carolina. By the time his term ended in 1879, Reconstruction had ended and the Democrats had taken nearly all power in South Carolina, so Patterson had no hope of reelection.

After leaving the Senate he continued to live in Washington, D.C., and engaged in financial enterprises. In 1886, he moved to Mifflintown, Pennsylvania, where he lived until his death. He continued to be active in business, particularly in running a company that installed electric lightbulbs. He died on September 28, 1912. He is buried in the Westminster Presbyterian Cemetery.

== Notes ==
U.S. Senate
Preceded by Frederick A. Sawyer	U.S. senator (Class 3) from South Carolina; March 4, 1873 – March 3, 1879; Served alongside: Thomas J. Robertson, Matthew Butler	Succeeded by Wade Hampton, III
