= Thomas J. Robertson =

American politician (1823–1897)

Thomas James Robertson
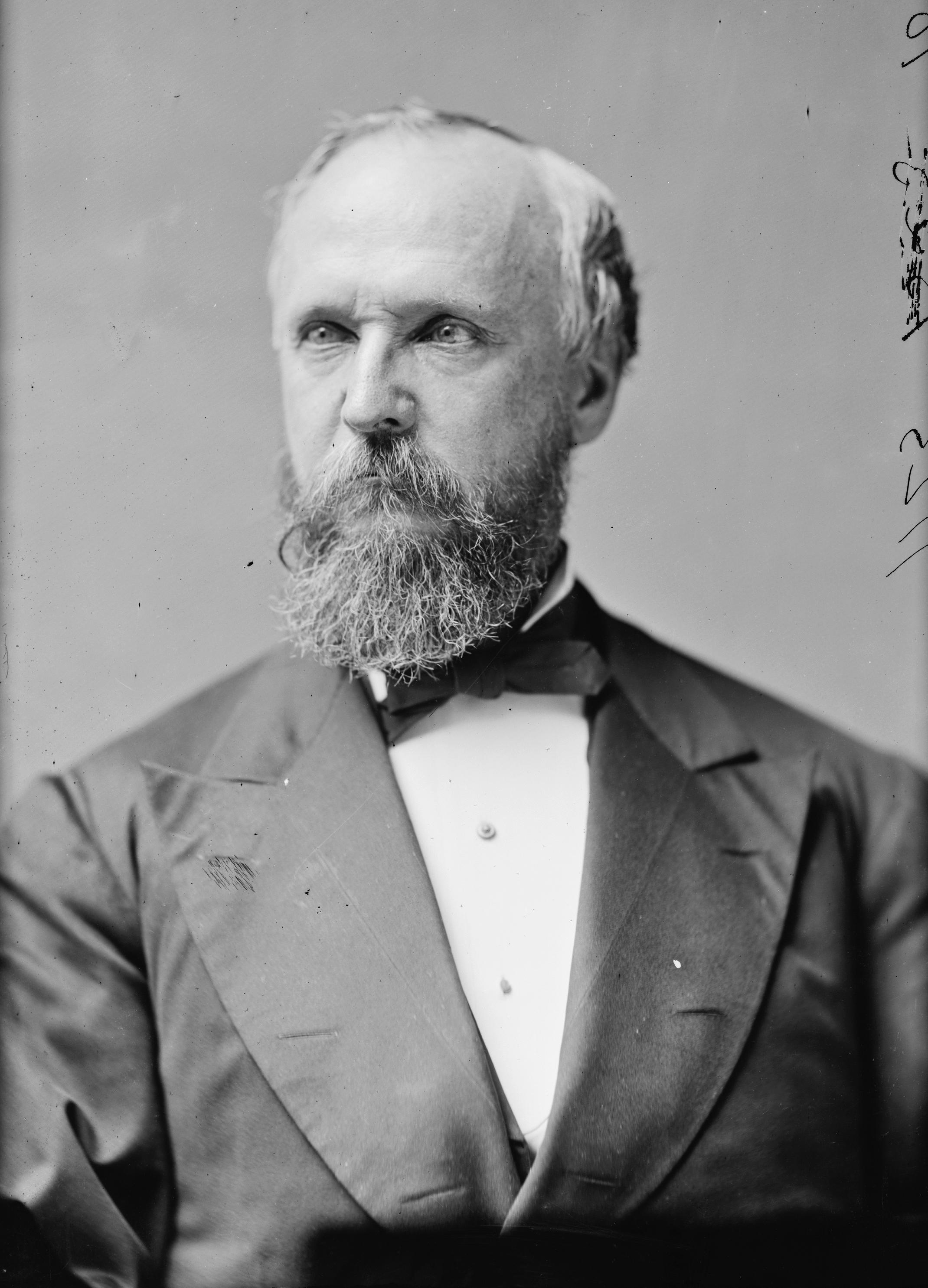

United States Senator from South Carolina
- In office July 15, 1868 – March 3, 1877
- Preceded by: James Chesnut, Jr.
- Succeeded by: Matthew Butler

Personal details
- Born: August 3, 1823 near Winnsboro, South Carolina, U.S.
- Died: October 13, 1897 (aged 74) Columbia, South Carolina
- Resting place: Elmwood Cemetery
- Party: Republican
- Education: South Carolina College

Thomas James Robertson (August 3, 1823 – October 13, 1897) was a United States senator from South Carolina. Born near Winnsboro, he completed preparatory studies and graduated from South Carolina College (now the University of South Carolina) at Columbia in 1843. He engaged in planting and owned slaves. He was a member of the State constitutional convention in 1865.

Upon the readmission of the State of South Carolina to representation in Congress in 1868, Robertson was elected as a Republican to the U.S. Senate; he was reelected in 1871 and served from July 15, 1868, to March 3, 1877, and was not a candidate for reelection amidst the end of Reconstruction. While in the Senate he was chairman of the Committee on Manufactures (Forty-second through Forty-fourth Congresses). Robertson voted against the Ku Klux Klan Act, but voted for the Civil Rights Act of 1875. After serving in Congress, Robertson retired from public life and active business due to ill health, and in 1897 died in Columbia. He was buried in Elmwood Cemetery.

== Sources ==
- United States Congress. "Thomas J. Robertson (id: R000327)". Biographical Directory of the United States Congress.

U.S. Senate
Preceded by vacant^{1}	U.S. senator (Class 2) from South Carolina; 1868–1877; Served alongside: Frederick A. Sawyer, John J. Patterson	Succeeded by Matthew C. Butler
Notes and references
1. Because of South Carolina's secession from the Union in 1860, seat was declared vacant from 1860-1868 when James Chesnut, Jr. withdrew from the Senate.
