= George A. La Dow =

American politician (1826–1875)

George Augustus La Dow

Member of the U.S. House of Representatives from Oregon's At-large district
- In office March 4, 1875 – May 1, 1875
- Preceded by: James W. Nesmith
- Succeeded by: Lafayette Lane

Member of the Oregon House of Representatives
- In office 1872–1874

Member of the Minnesota House of Representatives
- In office 1868–1869

Personal details
- Born: March 18, 1826 Cayuga County, New York
- Died: May 1, 1875 (aged 49) Pendleton, Oregon
- Party: Democratic

George Augustus La Dow (March 18, 1826 – May 1, 1875) was a U.S. representative from Oregon. Elected as a Democrat due to a split among Republicans, La Dow died before Congress assembled.

== Early life ==
Born in Cayuga County, New York, near Syracuse, La Dow moved with his family to McHenry County, Illinois, where he attended public school and studied law. In 1850, he was admitted to the bar and opened a law practice in Waupaca, Wisconsin. From 1860 to 1862, he served as district attorney of Waupaca County.

In 1862, he moved his law practice to Wilton, Minnesota, and served as a member of the Minnesota House of Representatives in 1868 and 1869.

== Congressional campaign of 1874 ==
In 1869, La Dow moved to Pendleton, Oregon, serving one term as a member of the Oregon House of Representatives from 1872 to 1874.

In 1874, he was selected as the Democratic nominee for Oregon's seat in the United States House of Representatives. Though little known outside of Umatilla County, due to a split among Oregon Republicans, La Dow faced not only Republican candidate Richard Williams, but also Timothy W. Davenport (father of political cartoonist Homer Davenport), who ran as an Independent. Williams and Davenport debated each other all around the state, split the Republican vote, and handed La Dow a plurality and the election.

However, before Congress convened its session, La Dow died on May 1, 1875. He was interred in Pioneer Park Cemetery in Pendleton.

United States House election, 1874: Oregon's at-large congressional district
Party	Candidate	Votes	%	±%
Democratic	George A. La Dow	9,642	38%	
Republican	Richard Williams	9,340	37%	
Independent	Timothy W. Davenport	6,350	25%	

== See also ==
- List of members of the United States Congress who died in office (1790–1899)

U.S. House of Representatives
Preceded by James W. Nesmith	Member of the U.S. House of Representatives from Oregon's at-large congressional district March 4, 1875 – May 1, 1875	Succeeded by Lafayette Lane
