= Lafayette Lane =

American lawyer and politician in Oregon (1842–1896)

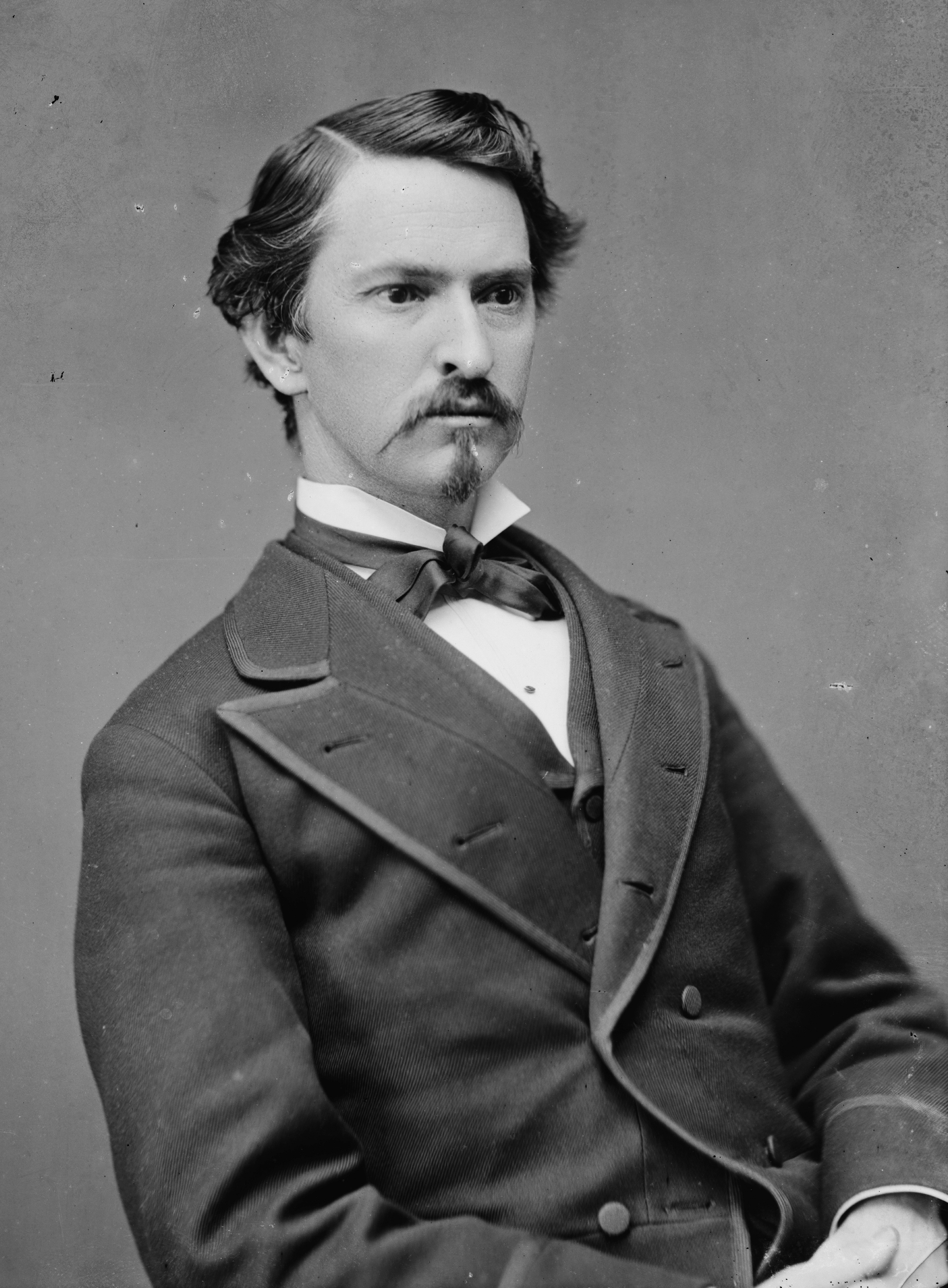

Member of the U.S. House of Representatives from Oregon's At-large district
- In office October 25, 1875 – March 3, 1877
- Preceded by: George A. La Dow
- Succeeded by: Richard Williams

Member of the Oregon House of Representatives
- In office 1864

Personal details
- Born: November 12, 1842 Evansville, Indiana
- Died: November 23, 1896 (aged 54) Roseburg, Oregon
- Party: Democratic
- Spouse: Amanda Mann

Lafayette Lane (November 12, 1842 – November 23, 1896) was an American lawyer and politician who served one term as a U.S. representative from the U.S. state of Oregon from 1875 to 1877. He was the son of Oregon Senator Joseph Lane and an uncle of future Oregon Senator Harry Lane.

== Early life ==
Lane was born near Evansville, Indiana, to then-Indiana state senator Joseph Lane and his wife Polly Hart Lane, one of 10 children. When Joseph was appointed governor of Oregon Territory in 1848, the Lanes moved west along the Oregon Trail, arriving in Oregon in March 1849.

Lafayette attended public schools in Washington, DC, and Stamford, Connecticut, studied law, and was admitted to the bar and commenced practice in Roseburg, Oregon. He married Amanda Mann in 1867.

== Political career ==
In 1864, Lane served as member of the Oregon House of Representatives, representing Umatilla County. In 1866, he was the a Democratic nominee for Oregon Secretary of State in 1866, but was defeated by incumbent Samuel E. May.

In 1874, Lane was appointed as a code commissioner, where along with noted jurist Matthew Deady, he compiled Oregon's statutes into a systematic code, Deady and Lane's General Laws of Oregon.

== Congress ==
In 1874, fellow Democrat George A. La Dow was elected to the US House of Representatives, but died two months into his term. In a special election, Lane was elected to fill La Dow's vacancy, defeating Republican Henry Warren. He served one term from October 25, 1875, to March 3, 1877. He sought re-election in 1876, but was defeated by Republican Richard Williams.

== After Congress ==
Following his defeat, Lane returned to Roseburg and resumed his law practice. He died in Roseburg on November 23, 1896, and was interred in Roseburg's St. Joseph Catholic Cemetery.

U.S. House of Representatives
Preceded by George Augustus La Dow	Member of the U.S. House of Representatives from Oregon's at-large congressional district October 25, 1875 – March 3, 1877	Succeeded by Richard Williams
