= List of members of the United States Congress by brevity of service =

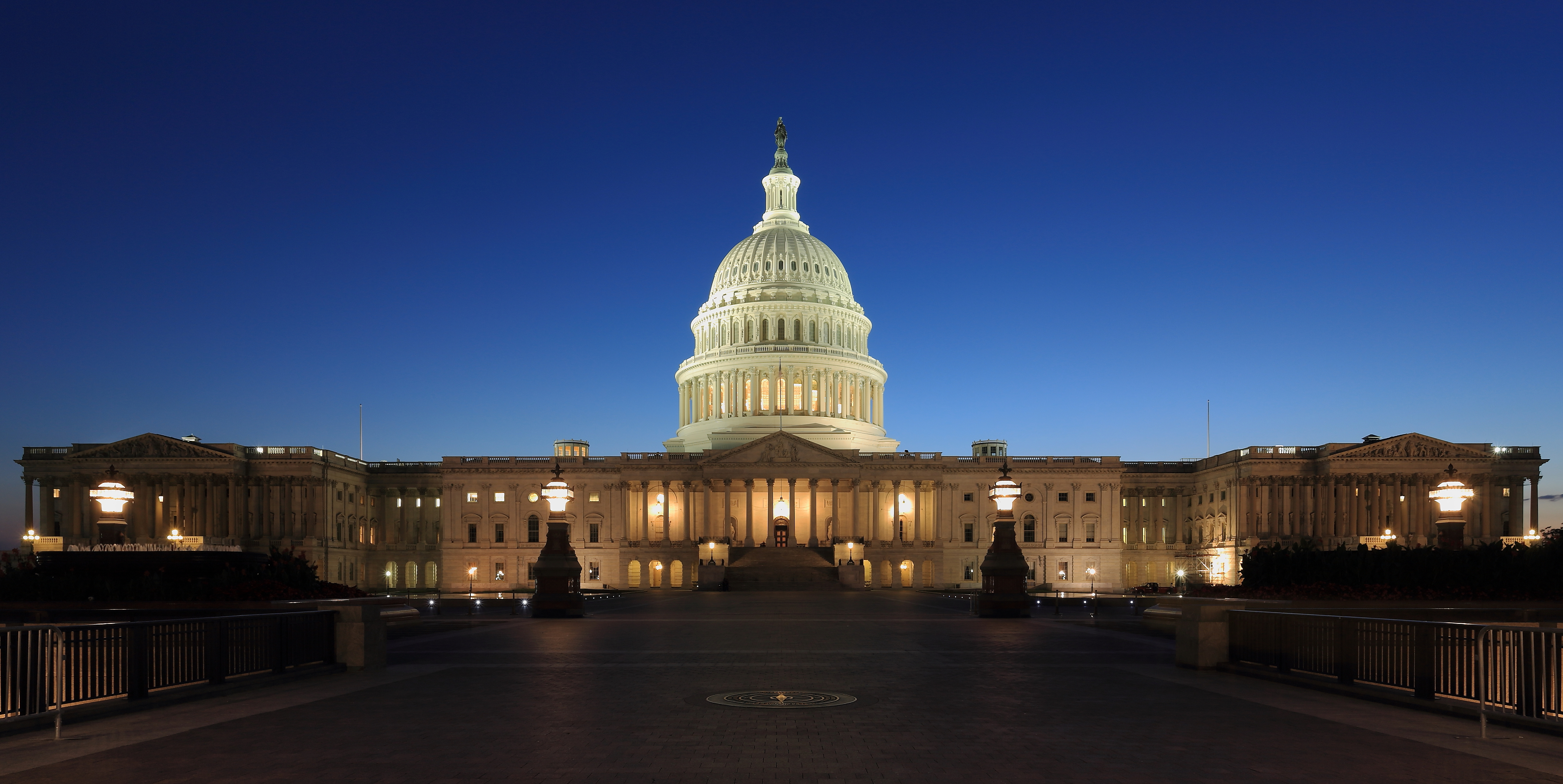
United States Capitol (2013), meeting place of the United States Congress

This is a list of United States congresspersons by brevity of service. It includes representatives and senators who have served less than six years in the Senate or less than two years in the House, not counting currently serving members. This list excludes members whose term ended with 73rd United States Congress that served the entirety of that term, which, due to the Twentieth Amendment to the United States Constitution, only lasted from March 4, 1933, to January 3, 1935, and inaugural holders of Class 1 and Class 2 Senate seats that served the entirety of the first term, due to the initial terms being only 2 and 4 years long respectively, as the Senate classes were staggered so that a third of the seats would be up every two years.

== Key ==
In green	Appointed to Senate or won special election
D	Died
R	Resigned
AE	Appointed or elected to a different office
O	Other reason for loss of office

== Senate time ==
Tenure	Name	Party affiliation	State	Reason for leaving	Dates of service	Lifespan	Reference
3 days	Louis C. Wyman (O)	Republican	New Hampshire	Initially won election to the Senate, but was appointed shortly before it convened to give him seniority over the rest of the incoming cohort. His seat was ruled to be vacant and a new election was held.	December 31, 1974 – January 3, 1975	1917–2002	
8 days	Homer V. M. Miller (O)	Democratic	Georgia	Won election to the Senate, but was not seated until February 24, 1871, and served the remainder of his term.	February 24, 1871 – March 3, 1871	1814–1896	
10 days	Alva M. Lumpkin (D)	Democratic	South Carolina	Appointed following the vacancy created by James F. Byrnes's appointment to the Supreme Court and later died.	July 22, 1941 – August 1, 1941	1886–1941	
23 days	John N. Heiskell (O)	Democratic	Arkansas	Appointed by Governor George Washington Donaghey following the vacancy created by Jeff Davis's death.	January 6, 1913 – January 29, 1913	1872–1972	
33 days	William Marmaduke Kavanaugh (O)	Democratic	Arkansas	Appointed by the Arkansas General Assembly following the vacancy created by Jeff Davis's death.	January 29, 1913 – March 3, 1913	1866–1915	
44 days	Wilton E. Hall (O)	Democratic	South Carolina	Appointed following the vacancy created by Ellison D. Smith's death and chose not to seek election.	November 20, 1944 – January 3, 1945	1901–1980	
50 days (Note: If one were to only count following her inauguration then she would only have served one day, but if tenure were counted she would have served 50 days)	Rebecca Latimer Felton (O)	Democratic	Georgia	Appointed and did not seek election.	November 21, 1922 – November 22, 1922 (Note: Tenure: October 3, 1922 – November 22, 1922)	1835–1930	
55 days	Thomas M. Storke (O)	Democratic	California	Appointed as interim senator following the vacancy created by William Gibbs McAdoo's resignation and the inauguration of Sheridan Downey.	November 9, 1938 – January 3, 1939	1876–1971	
59 days	Dean Barkley (O)	Independence Party of Minnesota	Minnesota	Appointed following the death of Paul Wellstone.	November 4, 2002 – January 3, 2003	1950–present	
59 days	John Moses (D)	Democratic	North Dakota	Won in the general election, died in office.	January 3, 1945 – March 3, 1945	1885–1945	
61 days	Ernest S. Brown (R)	Republican	Nevada	Appointed to fill out the remainder of Pat McCarran's term and resigned after losing the special election to allow Alan Bible to gain seniority.	October 1, 1954 – December 1, 1954	1903–1965	
66 days	Andrew Jackson Houston (D)	Democratic	Texas	Appointed to fill the vacancy caused by the death of Morris Sheppard, died in office.	April 21, 1941 – June 26, 1941	1854–1941	
73 days	George Jones (O)	Democratic-Republican	Georgia	Appointed to fill out the remainder of Abraham Baldwin's term.	August 27, 1807 – November 7, 1807	1766–1838	
93 days	Jocelyn Burdick (O)	Democratic	North Dakota	Appointed following the death of her husband Quentin Burdick.	September 12, 1992 – December 14, 1992	1922–2019	
97 days	George Walton (R)	Federalist	Georgia	Appointed following the vacancy created by James Jackson's resignation.	November 16, 1795 – February 20, 1796	1749–1804	
99 days	Frank C. Partridge (O)	Republican	Vermont	Appointed to fill the vacancy caused by the death of Frank L. Greene and lost special election for the remainder of the term.	December 23, 1930 – March 31, 1931	1861–1943	
104 days	Elaine Edwards (R)	Democratic	Louisiana	Appointed following the death of Allen J. Ellender and later resigned.	August 1, 1972 – November 13, 1972	1929–2018	
107 days	George Helmy (R)	Democratic	New Jersey	Appointed to fill out the remainder of Bob Menendez's term and did not seek election to a full term.	August 23, 2024 – December 8, 2024	1979–present	
110 days	Middleton P. Barrow (O)	Democratic	Georgia	Appointed to fill out the remainder of Benjamin Harvey Hill's term and did not seek election to a term in his own right.	November 15, 1882 – March 3, 1883	1839–1903	
117 days	Oliver H. Prince (O)	Democratic	Georgia	Selected by the state legislature to fill the vacancy caused by Thomas W. Cobb's resignation.	November 7, 1828 – March 4, 1829	1782–1837	
121 days	Carte Goodwin (O)	Democratic	West Virginia	Appointed by Governor Joe Manchin on July 16, 2010, as a placeholder to fill the vacancy created by Robert Byrd's death.	July 16, 2010 – November 15, 2010	1974–present	
129 days	Charles B. Mitchel (O)	Democratic	Arkansas	Elected in the general election and later expelled from the Senate.	March 4, 1861 – July 11, 1861	1815–1864	
133 days	Paul G. Kirk (O)	Democratic	Massachusetts	Appointed following the death of Ted Kennedy and chose not to run in the special election.	September 24, 2009 – February 4, 2010	1938–present	
143 days	Jeffrey Chiesa (O)	Republican	New Jersey	Appointed following the death of Frank Lautenberg and chose not to run in the special election.	June 10, 2013 – October 31, 2013	1965–present	
144 days	Bob Krueger (O)	Democratic	Texas	Appointed following the appointment of Lloyd Bentsen as Secretary of the Treasury and was defeated in the special election.	January 21, 1993 – June 14, 1993	1935–2022	
144 days	Dixie Bibb Graves (R)	Democratic	Alabama	Appointed following the appointment of Hugo Black as a Supreme Court Justice and later resigned.	August 20, 1937 – January 10, 1938	1882–1965	
144 days	George R. Swift (O)	Democratic	Alabama	Appointed following the death of John H. Bankhead II.	June 15, 1946 – November 5, 1946	1887–1972	
149 days	Sheila Frahm (O)	Republican	Kansas	Appointed following the resignation of Bob Dole and was defeated in the Republican primary.	June 11, 1996 – November 7, 1996	1945–present	
152 days	Maryon Pittman Allen (O)	Democratic	Alabama	Appointed following the death of her husband James Allen and later lost the Democratic primary for the special election.	June 8, 1978 – November 7, 1978	1925–2018	
165 days	Mo Cowan (O)	Democratic	Massachusetts	Appointed following the appointment of John Kerry as Secretary of State and chose not to run in the special election.	February 1, 2013 – July 16, 2013	1969–present	
178 days	Joe Bottum (O)	Republican	South Dakota	Appointed following the death of Francis Case and lost the election for a new term.	July 9, 1962 – January 3, 1963	1903–1984	
193 days	Ernest W. Gibson, Jr. (O)	Republican	Vermont	Appointed by Governor George D. Aiken following the death of his father, Ernest Willard Gibson. Chose not to run for election to the seat.	June 24, 1940 – January 3, 1941	1901–1969	
213 days	William Bellinger Bulloch (O)	Democratic-Republican	Georgia	Appointed following the resignation of William H. Crawford.	April 8, 1813 – November 6, 1813	1777–1852	
215 days	Thomas A. Wofford (O)	Democratic	South Carolina	Appointed following the resignation of Strom Thurmond and chose not to run in the special election.	April 5, 1956 – November 6, 1956	1908–1978	
240 days	Joseph M. Terrell (O)	Democratic	Georgia	Appointed following the death of Alexander S. Clay and resigned following a stroke.	November 17, 1910 – July 14, 1911	1861–1912	
242 days	B. B. Comer (O)	Democratic	Alabama	Appointed following the death of John H. Bankhead.	March 5, 1920 – November 2, 1920	1848–1927	
247 days	William Stanley West (O)	Democratic	Georgia	Appointed following the death of Augustus O. Bacon.	March 2, 1914 – November 3, 1914	1849–1914	
259 days	Nicholas F. Brady (O)	Republican	New Jersey	Appointed following the resignation of Harrison A. Williams.	April 12, 1982 – December 27, 1982	1930–present	
262 days	John S. Cohen (O)	Democratic	Georgia	Appointed following the death of William J. Harris and chose not to run in the special election.	April 25, 1932 – January 11, 1933	1870–1935	
274 days	Israel Pickens (O)	Democratic	Alabama	Appointed following the death of Henry H. Chambers.	February 17, 1826 – November 27, 1826	1780–1827	
275 days	John C. Breckinridge (O)	Democratic	Kentucky	Elected in the general election and later expelled from the Senate.	March 4, 1861 – December 4, 1861	1821–1875	
277 days	Robert M. Charlton (O)	Democratic	Georgia	Appointed following the resignation of John M. Berrien.	May 31, 1852 – March 4, 1853	1807–1854	
297 days	Francis S. White (O)	Democratic	Alabama	Elected in the special election following the death of Joseph F. Johnston. Did not run for reelection.	May 11, 1914 – March 3, 1915	1847–1922	
299 days	Waldo P. Johnson (O)	Democratic	Missouri	Elected in the general election and later expelled from the Senate.	March 17, 1861 – January 10, 1862	1817–1885	
303 days	George S. Houston (D)	Democratic	Alabama	Elected in the general election and died in office.	March 4, 1879 – December 31, 1879	1811–1879	
307 days	Luther Strange (O)	Republican	Alabama	Appointed to fill the seat vacated by Jeff Sessions after his resignation to become U.S. Attorney General, but subsequently lost the Republican primary for the special election.	February 9, 2017 – January 3, 2018	1953–present	
322 days	Luke Pryor (O)	Democratic	Alabama	Appointed following the death of George S. Houston.	January 7, 1880 – November 23, 1880	1820–1900	
327 days	Henry H. Chambers (D)	Jacksonian	Alabama	Died in office.	March 4, 1825 – January 24, 1826	1790–1826	
337 days	Patrick Walsh (O)	Democratic	Georgia	Appointed to fill out the remainder of the term of Alfred H. Colquitt.	April 2, 1894 – March 3, 1895	1840–1899	
340 days	William Blount (O)	Democratic-Republican	Tennessee	Appointed as Tennessee's first senator and was later expelled from the Senate.	August 2, 1796 – July 8, 1797	1749–1800	
373 days	Hiram Rhodes Revels (O)	Republican	Mississippi	Elected in a special election following Mississippi's readmission into the United States and later chose not to seek reelection.	February 23, 1870 – March 3, 1871	1827–1901	
380 days	Kelly Loeffler (O)	Republican	Georgia	Appointed to fill the vacancy created by Johnny Isakson's resignation, lost subsequent special runoff election.	January 6, 2020 – January 20, 2021	1970–present	
389 days	Kaneaster Hodges Jr. (O)	Democratic	Arkansas	Appointed to fill the vacancy created by John L. McClellan's death, prohibited by state law from seeking election to fill the vacancy.	December 10, 1977 – January 3, 1979	1938–2022	
434 days	Laphonza Butler (R)	Democratic	California	Appointed to fill the vacancy created by Dianne Feinstein's death and did not seek election to a full term.	October 1, 2023 – December 8, 2024	1979–present	
474 days	Louis Wigfall (O)	Democratic	Texas	Appointed to fill the vacancy created by James Pinckney Henderson's death and later expelled from the Senate.	December 5, 1859 – March 23, 1861	1816–1874	
642 days	Lloyd Spencer (O)	Democratic	Arkansas	Appointed to fill the vacancy created by John E. Miller's resignation to become a judge and did not run for election.	April 1, 1941 – January 3, 1943	1893–1981	
668 days	Ted Kaufman (O)	Democratic	Delaware	Appointed to fill the vacancy created by Joe Biden's resignation and chose not to run in the special election.	January 16, 2009 – November 15, 2010	1939–present	
690 days	Jean Carnahan (O)	Democratic	Missouri	Appointed to fill vacancy created by her husband Mel Carnahan's death who died before being elected. Jean Carnahan was defeated in a special election to fill the remainder of the term.	January 3, 2001 – November 23, 2002	1933–2024	
698 days	Harlan Mathews (O)	Democratic	Tennessee	Appointed to fill the vacancy created by Al Gore's resignation and chose not to run in the special election.	January 2, 1993 – December 1, 1994	1927–2014	
699 days	Martha McSally (O)	Republican	Arizona	Appointed to fill the vacancy created by Jon Kyl, lost subsequent special election.	January 3, 2019 – December 2, 2020	1966–present	
738 days	JD Vance (AE)	Republican	Ohio	Elected in the general election and later resigned after winning the 2024 election as vice president.	January 3, 2023 – January 10, 2025	1984–present	
762 days	Richard Nixon (AE)	Republican	California	Appointed following the resignation of Sheridan Downey to the seat he recently won the election for to gain seniority and later elected to the vice presidency.	December 1, 1950 – January 1, 1953	1913–1994	
787 days	Donald Stewart (R)	Democratic	Alabama	Elected in a special election following the death of James Allen. Lost renomination and resigned.	November 8, 1978 – January 2, 1981	1940–present	
813 days	William Kelly (O)	Democratic-Republican	Alabama	Elected following the resignation of John Williams Walker.	December 12, 1822 – March 3, 1825	1786–1834	
1,064 days	Scott Brown (O)	Republican	Massachusetts	Won special election against Martha Coakley to finish Ted Kennedy's term in 2010, and sworn on February 4, 2010. Subsequently lost regular election for next term against Democrat Elizabeth Warren.	February 4, 2010 – January 3, 2013	1959–present	
1,095 days	John Williams Walker (R)	Democratic-Republican	Alabama	Resigned due to failing health.	December 14, 1819 – December 12, 1822	1783–1823	
1,096 days	Doug Jones (O)	Democratic	Alabama	Won special election against Roy Moore to finish Jeff Sessions's term in 2017, and sworn in January 2018. Subsequently lost regular election for next term against Republican Tommy Tuberville.	January 3, 2018 – January 3, 2021	1954–present	
1,100 days	William Wyatt Bibb (R)	Democratic-Republican	Georgia	Elected following the resignation of William H. Crawford.	November 6, 1813 – November 9, 1816	1781–1820	
1,108 days	Josiah Tattnall (O)	Democratic-Republican	Georgia	Elected following the resignation of James Jackson.	February 20, 1796 – March 4, 1799	1765–1803	
1,176 days	Markwayne Mullin (AE)	Republican	Oklahoma	Elected to fill the vacancy created by Jim Inhofe's resignation and later resigned on appointment as United States Secretary of Homeland Security.	January 3, 2023 – March 24, 2026	1977–present	
1,190 days	Jeremiah Clemens (O)	Democratic	Alabama	Elected following the death of Dixon Hall Lewis.	November 30, 1849 – March 4, 1853	1814–1865	
1,232 days	John E. Miller (R)	Democratic	Arkansas	Elected in special election to fill the vacancy created by Joseph T. Robinson's death and resigned to become a judge.	November 15, 1937 – March 31, 1941	1888–1981	
1,245 days	John Milledge (R)	Democratic-Republican	Georgia	Elected following the death of James Jackson.	June 19, 1806 – November 14, 1809	1757–1818	
1,413 days	Barack Obama (AE)	Democratic	Illinois	Elected in the general election and later resigned after winning the 2008 presidential election.	January 3, 2005 – November 16, 2008	1961–present	
1,476 days	Kamala Harris (AE)	Democratic	California	Elected in the general election and later resigned after winning the 2020 election as vice president.	January 3, 2017 – January 18, 2021	1964–present	
1,779 days	John Forsyth (AE)	Democratic-Republican	Georgia	Elected following the resignation of George Troup, then resigned to become U.S. Minister to Spain. Elected again following the resignation of John M. Berrien, re-elected, and then resigned to become U.S. Secretary of State.	November 23, 1818 – February 17, 1819; November 9, 1829 – June 27, 1834	1780–1841	
1,964 days	William H. Crawford (AE)	Democratic-Republican	Georgia	Elected in a special election following the death of Abraham Baldwin. Re-elected, then resigned to become U.S. Minister to France.	November 7, 1807 – March 23, 1813	1772–1834	

== House time ==
Tenure	Name	Party affiliation	State	Reason for leaving	Dates of service	Lifespan	Reference
1 day	Effingham Lawrence (O)	Democratic	Louisiana	The results of the 1872 election in the district were contested, and the House did not declare Lawrence the winner of the election and seat him until March 3, 1875, the day before the term was to expire.	March 3, 1875 – March 4, 1875	1820–1878	
1 day	George A. Sheridan (O)	Liberal Republican	Louisiana	The results of the 1872 election in the district were contested, and the House did not declare Sheridan the winner of the election and seat him until March 3, 1875, the day before the term was to expire.	March 3, 1875 – March 4, 1875	1840–1896	
2 days	Turner M. Marquett (O)	Republican	Nebraska	Elected to the at-large seat of the new State of Nebraska, but, because the state was not formally admitted to the Union until March 2, 1867, he was only able to serve as a representative for two days.	March 2, 1867 – March 4, 1867	1831–1894	
2 days	Gustavus Sessinghaus (O)	Republican	Missouri	The results of the 1880 election in the district were contested, and the House did not declare Sessinghaus the winner of the election and seat him until March 2, 1883, two days before the term was to expire.	March 2, 1883 – March 4, 1883 (Note: While the issue of whether the congressional term prior to the adoption of the 20th Amendment ended at 11:59 p.m. on March 3 or at 11:59 a.m. on March 4 was one that never was resolved conclusively in either the House of Representatives or Senate, the final House session of the 47th Congress ended on March 4, 1883. See)	1838–1887	
29 days	Walter W. Bankhead (R)	Democratic	Alabama	Won in the general election and later resigned.	January 3, 1941 – February 1, 1941	1897–1988	
31 days	Kwanza Hall	Democratic	Georgia	Won special runoff election one month after general election day to fill John Lewis's seat after his death and was not a candidate in the regular election.	December 3, 2020 – January 3, 2021	1971–present	
35 days	Brenda Jones	Democratic	Michigan	Won special election and was defeated in Democratic primary for a full term.	November 29, 2018 – January 3, 2019	1959–present	
39 days	James Mann (D)	Democratic	Louisiana	Won in the general election and died in office.	July 18, 1868 – August 26, 1868	1822–1868	
51 days	David Curson	Democratic	Michigan	Won special election and did not seek reelection.	November 13, 2012 – January 3, 2013	1948–2024	
51 days	Shelley Sekula-Gibbs	Republican	Texas	Won special election but lost regular general election (as a write-in candidate) held the same day.	November 13, 2006 – January 3, 2007	1953–present	
53 days	Erica Lee Carter	Democratic	Texas	Won special election to fill the seat of her deceased mother, Sheila Jackson Lee, and did not run in the general election.	November 12, 2024 – January 3, 2025	1980–present	
54 days	Douglas Hemphill Elliott (D)	Republican	Pennsylvania	Won special election to fill Richard M. Simpson's seat following his death and died in office.	April 26, 1960 – June 19, 1960	1921–1960	
58 days	Willa L. Fulmer	Democratic	South Carolina	Won special election to fill her husband Hampton P. Fulmer's vacant seat following his death and did not seek reelection.	November 7, 1944 – January 3, 1945	1884–1968	
61 days	Sylvester Turner (D)	Democratic	Texas	Won in the general election and died in office.	January 3, 2025 – March 5, 2025	1954–2025	
62 days	Lewis E. Sawyer (D)	Democratic	Arkansas	Won in the general election and died in office.	March 4, 1923 – May 5, 1923	1867–1923	
84 days	Nathaniel D. Wallace	Democratic	Louisiana	Won special election and did not seek reelection.	December 9, 1886 – March 3, 1887	1845–1894	
89 days	John W. Hunter	Democratic	New York	Won special election to fill James Humphrey's seat following his death and did not seek reelection.	December 4, 1866 – March 3, 1867	1807–1900	
90 days	Alexander Boarman	Liberal Republican	Louisiana	Won special election and lost reelection.	December 3, 1872 – March 3, 1873	1839–1916	
90 days	Benjamin Flanders	Unionist	Louisiana	Won special election and did not seek reelection.	December 3, 1862 – March 3, 1863	1816–1896	
95 days	William Francis Strudwick	Federalist	North Carolina	Won a special election to replace Absalom Tatom and did not seek reelection.	November 28, 1796 – March 3, 1797	1765–1812	
107 days	Robert L. Coffey (D)	Democratic	Pennsylvania	Won in the general election and died in office.	January 3, 1949 – April 20, 1949	1918–1949	
112 days	Joe Sempolinski	Republican	New York	Won in a special election to replace Tom Reed and did not seek reelection.	September 13, 2022 – January 3, 2023	1983–present	
118 days	J. Smith Young	Democratic	Louisiana	Won special election to fill John E. Leonard's seat following his death and did not seek reelection.	November 5, 1878 – March 3, 1879	1834–1916	
121 days	Richard Alvin Tonry (R)	Democratic	Louisiana	Won in the general election and later resigned.	January 3, 1977 – May 4, 1977	1935–2012	
152 days	John William Reid (O)	Democratic	Missouri	Won in the general election and later expelled from the House.	March 4, 1861 – August 3, 1861	1821–1881	
179 days	Greg Lopez	Republican	Colorado	Won in the special election to replace Ken Buck and did not run in the general election.	July 8, 2024 – January 3, 2025	1964–present	
188 days	Jean Spencer Ashbrook	Republican	Ohio	Won in a special election to replace her husband John M. Ashbrook and did not seek reelection.	June 29, 1982 – January 3, 1983	1934–present	
196 days	Mayra Flores	Republican	Texas	Won in a special election to replace Filemon Vela Jr. and lost reelection.	June 21, 2022 – January 3, 2023	1986–present	
203 days	Connie Conway	Republican	California	Won in a special election to replace Devin Nunes and did not seek reelection.	June 14, 2022 – January 3, 2023	1950–present	
207 days	James C. Alvord (D)	Whig	Massachusetts	Won in the general election and later died.	March 4, 1839 – September 27, 1839	1808–1839	
207 days	Alton Waldon	Democratic	New York	Won in a special election to replace Joseph P. Addabbo and later lost renomination.	June 10, 1986 – January 3, 1987	1936–2023	
214 days	William B. Spencer (R)	Democratic	Louisiana	Won a special election, and resigned to accept a judicial appointment.	June 8, 1876 – January 8, 1877	1835–1882	
222 days	Larkin I. Smith (D)	Republican	Mississippi	Won in the general election and later died.	January 3, 1989 – August 13, 1989	1944–1989	
226 days	Charles Djou	Republican	Hawaii	Won in a special election to replace Neil Abercrombie and later lost reelection.	May 22, 2010 – January 3, 2011	1970–present	
228 days	W. Jasper Blackburn	Republican	Louisiana	Elected following Louisiana's readmission to the Union.	July 18, 1868 – March 3, 1869	1820–1899	
228 days	Michel Vidal	Republican	Louisiana	Elected following Louisiana's readmission to the Union.	July 18, 1868 – March 3, 1869	1824–1895	
241 days	James Davenport (D)	Federalist	Connecticut	Won in a special election to replace James Hillhouse and later died.	December 5, 1796 – August 3, 1797	1758–1797	
245 days	Don Cazayoux	Democratic	Louisiana	Won in a special election to replace Richard Baker and later lost reelection.	May 3, 2008 – January 3, 2009	1964–present	
246 days	James McCleery (D)	Republican	Louisiana	Died in office.	March 4, 1871 – November 5, 1871	1837–1871	
298 days	Walter Capps (D)	Democratic	California	Won in the general election and later died in office.	January 3, 1997 – October 28, 1997	1934–1997	
304 days	Katie Hill (R)	Democratic	California	Won in the general election and later resigned.	January 3, 2019 – November 3, 2019	1987–present	
332 days	George Santos (O)	Republican	New York	Won in the general election and later expelled from House.	January 3, 2023 – December 1, 2023	1988–present	
358 days	Henry Latimer (AE)	Federalist	Delaware	Lost in the general election, but contested the results and was ruled as the victor causing a delayed inauguration and later elected to Senate.	February 14, 1794 – February 7, 1795	1752–1819	
376 days	John E. Leonard (D)	Republican	Louisiana	Died in office.	March 4, 1877 – March 15, 1878	1845–1878	
382 days	Bill Janklow (R)	Republican	South Dakota	Won in the general election and later resigned due to causing a fatal car crash	January 3, 2003 – January 20, 2004	1939–2012	
383 days	Anthony Wayne (O)	Democratic	Georgia	Won in the general election, but seat was later ruled as vacant due to dispute over his residency.	March 4, 1791 – March 21, 1792	1745–1796	
389 days	Trey Radel (R)	Republican	Florida	Won in the general election and later resigned.	January 3, 2013 – January 27, 2014	1976–present	
413 days	Vance McAllister (R)	Republican	Louisiana	Won a special election to replace Rodney Alexander and later did not seek reelection.	November 16, 2013 – January 3, 2015	1974–present	
417 days	Pierre Bossier (D)	Democratic	Louisiana	Died in office.	March 4, 1843 – April 24, 1844	1797–1844	
425 days	George Allen	Republican	Virginia	Won a special election to replace D. French Slaughter Jr. and later chose not to seek reelection.	November 5, 1991 – January 3, 1993	1952–present	
455 days	Absalom Tatom (R)	Democratic-Republican	North Carolina	Won in the general election and later resigned.	March 4, 1795 – June 1, 1796	1742–1802	
464 days	George Luke Smith	Republican	Louisiana	Won a special election following the death of Representative-elect Samuel Peters. Lost re-election.	November 24, 1873 – March 3, 1875	1837–1884	
466 days	Michael Hahn (D)	Unionist, Republican	Louisiana	Elected late from Union-occupied Louisiana during the Civil War. Louisiana lost representation after the 37th Congress. Later elected again, but died in office.	December 3, 1862 – March 4, 1863; March 4, 1885 – March 15, 1886	1830–1886	
475 days	Samuel Louis Gilmore (D)	Democratic	Louisiana	Died in office.	March 30, 1909 – July 18, 1910	1859–1910	
478 days	Bob Turner	Republican	New York	Won a special election to replace Anthony Weiner and did not seek reelection.	September 13, 2011 – January 3, 2013	1941–present	
492 days	Eric Massa (R)	Democratic	New York	Won in the general election and later resigned.	January 3, 2009 – March 8, 2010	1969–present	
512 days	Joseph P. Newsham	Republican	Louisiana	Elected upon Louisiana's readmission to the Union and did not seek reelection. Later elected in a special election to replace Michel Vidal, and did not seek reelection.	July 18, 1868 – March 3, 1869; May 23, 1870 – March 3, 1871	1837–1919	
522 days	Frank Ballance (R)	Democratic	North Carolina	Won in the general election and later resigned.	January 3, 2003 – June 8, 2004	1942–2019	
528 days	George Partridge (R)	Pro-Administration	Massachusetts	Won in the general election and later resigned.	March 4, 1789 – August 14, 1790	1740–1828	
531 days	Joseph F. Smith	Democratic	Pennsylvania	Won in a special election to replace Raymond Lederer and later lost in the Democratic primary.	July 21, 1981 – January 3, 1983	1920–1999	
531 days	Charles Magill Conrad (AE)	Whig	Louisiana	Resigned following appointment as U.S. Secretary of War.	March 4, 1849 – August 17, 1850	1804–1878	
556 days	Karen Handel	Republican	Georgia	Won a special election to replace Tom Price and later lost reelection.	June 26, 2017 – January 3, 2019	1962–present	
564 days	Mark Takai (D)	Democratic	Hawaii	Won in the general election and later died in office.	January 3, 2015 – July 20, 2016	1967–2016	
582 days	Kathy Hochul	Democratic	New York	Won a special election to replace Chris Lee and later lost reelection.	June 1, 2011 – January 3, 2013	1962–present	
582 days	Benjamin Franklin Whittemore (R)	Republican	South Carolina	Won a special election following South Carolina's readmission into the Union and later resigned.	July 18, 1868 – February 24, 1870	1824–1894	
594 days	Lovell Rousseau (R)	Unconditional Unionist	Kentucky	Elected in the general election, but resigned after being censured only to run in the special election and won to replace himself and later did not seek reelection.	March 4, 1865 – July 21, 1866; December 3, 1866 – March 3, 1867	1818–1869	
600 days	Bill Redmond	Republican	New Mexico	Won a special election to replace Bill Richardson and later lost reelection.	May 13, 1997 – January 3, 1999	1955–present	
602 days	John T. Deweese (R)	Republican	North Carolina	Won a special election following North Carolina's readmission into the Union and later resigned.	July 6, 1868 – February 28, 1870	1835–1906	
609 days	Peter W. Barca	Democratic	Wisconsin	Won a special election to replace Les Aspin and later lost reelection.	May 4, 1993 – January 3, 1995	1955–present	
614 days	Scott Murphy	Democratic	New York	Won a special election to replace Kirsten Gillibrand and later lost reelection.	April 29, 2009 – January 3, 2011	1970–present	
614 days	Uriah Forrest (R)	Federalist	Maryland	Won in the general election and later resigned.	March 4, 1793 – November 8, 1794	1756–1805	
644 days	Catherine Small Long	Democratic	Louisiana	Won a special election to replace her husband Gillis William Long and later chose not to run for reelection.	March 30, 1985 – January 3, 1987	1924–2019	
661 days	John H. Overton	Democratic	Louisiana	Won a special election to replace James B. Aswell. Did not seek reelection to the House.	May 12, 1931 – March 3, 1933	1875–1948	
674 days	Sam Brownback (AE)	Republican	Kansas	Won in the general election and later the special Senate election to replace Bob Dole.	January 3, 1995 – November 7, 1996	1956–present	
728 days	Jeff Jackson (AE; R)	Democratic	North Carolina	Won in the general election, and later the state attorney general election, but he resigned early before his initial House term ended to begin his term as North Carolina Attorney General.	January 3, 2023 – December 31, 2024	1982–present	
730 days	Tim Scott (AE; R)	Republican	South Carolina	Won in the general election, and later won reelection, but he resigned a day before his initial House term ended to accept appointment to the Senate.	January 3, 2011 – January 2, 2013	1965–present	

== See also ==
- List of members of the United States Congress by longevity of service
- List of United States representatives who served a single term
- List of shortest-serving members of the Parliament of Australia
