= Alfred Brooks Fry =

American engineer (1860–1933)

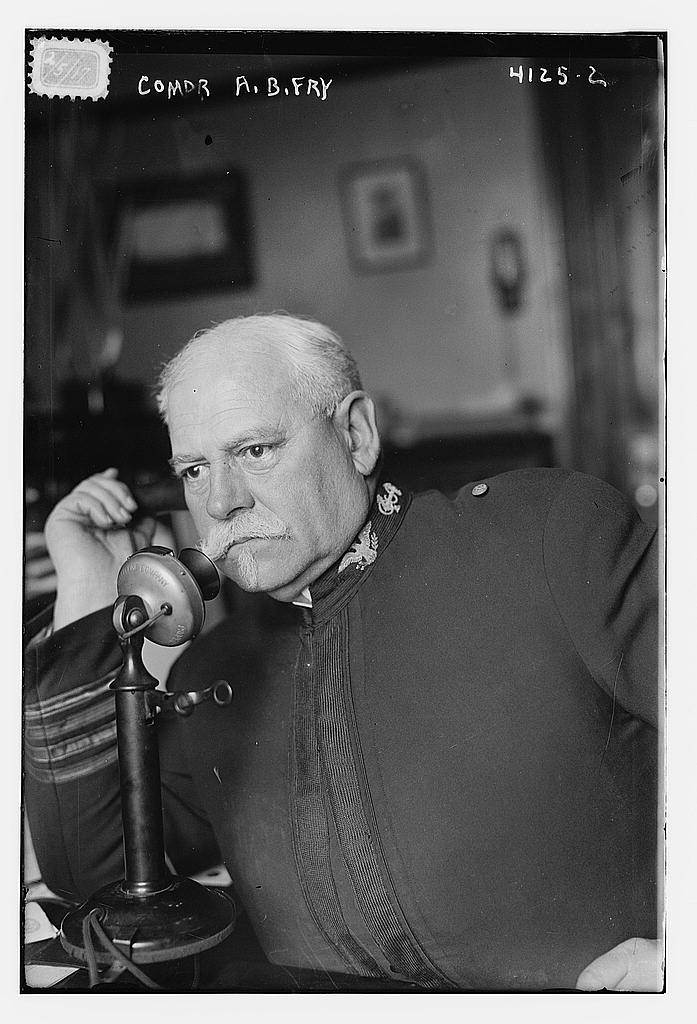
- Alfred Brooks Fry in 1917
- Born: March 3, 1860; New York City
- Died: December 4, 1933 (aged 73); San Diego, California
- Education: Columbia College
- Spouse: Emma Sheridan Fry
- Children: Sheridan Brooks Fry
- Parent: Brevet Major Thomas William Gardiner Fry
- Engineering career
- Discipline: Marine, mechanical and civil engineering
- Institutions: New York Naval Militia
- Employer: United States Post Office
- Significant design: Lyceum Theater

Alfred Brooks Fry (March 3, 1860 – December 4, 1933), was a marine, mechanical and civil engineer. He was head of the New York Naval Militia and served on active duty during the Spanish–American War and World War I. He was chief engineer of the United States Post Office., supervising engineer for the Port of New York. and chief superintendent of United States public buildings in New York City.

== Early life ==
He was born in New York City on March 3, 1860, to Brevet Major Thomas William Gardiner Fry (1832–1869), who served in the American Civil War, and Frances E. Olney. He was the great-grandson of Captain Benjamin Fry (d. 1799) who served in the Rhode Island Militia during the American Revolution.

== Early career ==
He entered Columbia College in 1877 and pursued a course in engineering but dropped out to pursue a career as a mariner. He was employed as a rodman and draftsman from 1877 to 1879 and as a machinist and marine engineer from 1879 to 1886. He was assistant engineer and chief engineer under the United States Treasury Department starting in 1886. By the early 20th Century he was employed as chief engineer and superintendent of United States public buildings and of engineering work under the Department of Commerce and Labor and Treasury Department for the Port of New York.

== Marriage ==
He married Emma Viola Sheridan on July 30, 1890, in Boston, Massachusetts. She was the daughter of Congressman George Augustus Sheridan. Their only son, Sheridan Brooks Fry, was born in 1893.

== Naval career ==
Fry joined the New York Naval Militia when it was founded in 1892 and rose to become its chief of staff holding the rank of engineer lieutenant-commander. During the Spanish–American War he served in the United States Navy when he was appointed on April 4, 1898, as passed assistant engineer aboard the Civil War vintage monitor USS Nahant. The Nahant was assigned to defend New York harbor. He was promoted on June 22, 1898, as acting chief engineer aboard the armed yacht USS Stranger and served as part of the West Indies Blockading Squadron off Havana, Cuba. He was discharged on September 13, 1898. After the war, he was promoted to commander in the New York Naval Militia.

In 1900 he was named as the naval aide-de-camp to Governor Theodore Roosevelt to replace Samuel Dana Greene, Jr., who died of hypothermia when he fell through the ice while skating in Schenectady, New York. Fry continued in this position in the administration of Governor Odell.

== Later career ==
In addition to his position with the Government, Fry also worked as a consultant in civil, mechanical, and electrical engineer for large corporations. He designed the ventilation system of the state of the art Lyceum Theater, which opened in September 1903.

Fry was appointed on February 18, 1904, by Governor Benjamin Odell of New York as a member of the Board of Consulting Engineers for canal construction and enlargement. He served in this capacity until 1911.

During the First World War, Fry served as a captain (with date of rank March 27, 1916) in the National Naval Volunteers – a component of the United States Navy, similar to the National Guard, which was later integrated in the United States Naval Reserve. After the war's end, he was re-instated on August 5, 1919, as supervising chief engineer of the Treasury Department in New York City.

In the early 1920s Fry served as an advisor in the Office of Naval Operations in Washington before he was appointed as the commander of the New York Naval Militia and was promoted to the rank of commodore about August 1923.

== Death ==
Fry died of a heart attack and heart disease in San Diego, California, on December 4, 1933, at the age of 73. His widow died in 1936.

== Memberships ==
Fry belonged to numerous organizations including the New York Athletic Club, Army and Navy Club, the American Society of Mechanical Engineers, and the American Society of Naval Engineers.

Fry also belonged to several hereditary and military societies. He was elected to the Rhode Island Society of the Cincinnati in 1887 (by right of his descent from Captain Benjamin Fry of Rhode Island) and he was a charter member of the Massachusetts Society of the Sons of the American Revolution. He joined the Society on May 10, 1889, and was assigned national membership number 679 and state membership number 78. He was also a member of the Military Order of the Loyal Legion of the United States, Society of Colonial Wars, Military Order of Foreign Wars and the Naval and Military Order of the Spanish War.

== Legacy ==
There is a large stone plaque listing Fry's accomplishments on display at the Newport Historical Society in Newport, Rhode Island.

There is a similar plaque honoring Fry's father, Brevet Major Thomas William Gardiner Fry (1832–1869), in the armory of the Varnum Continentals in East Greenwich, Rhode Island. Major Fry was wounded in action at the Battle of Chancellorsville and recovered from his wounds to fight at the Battle of Gettysburg two months later. The plaque was presented by his relative William Congdon Fry in 1938.
