= List of longest-serving members of the United States Congress =

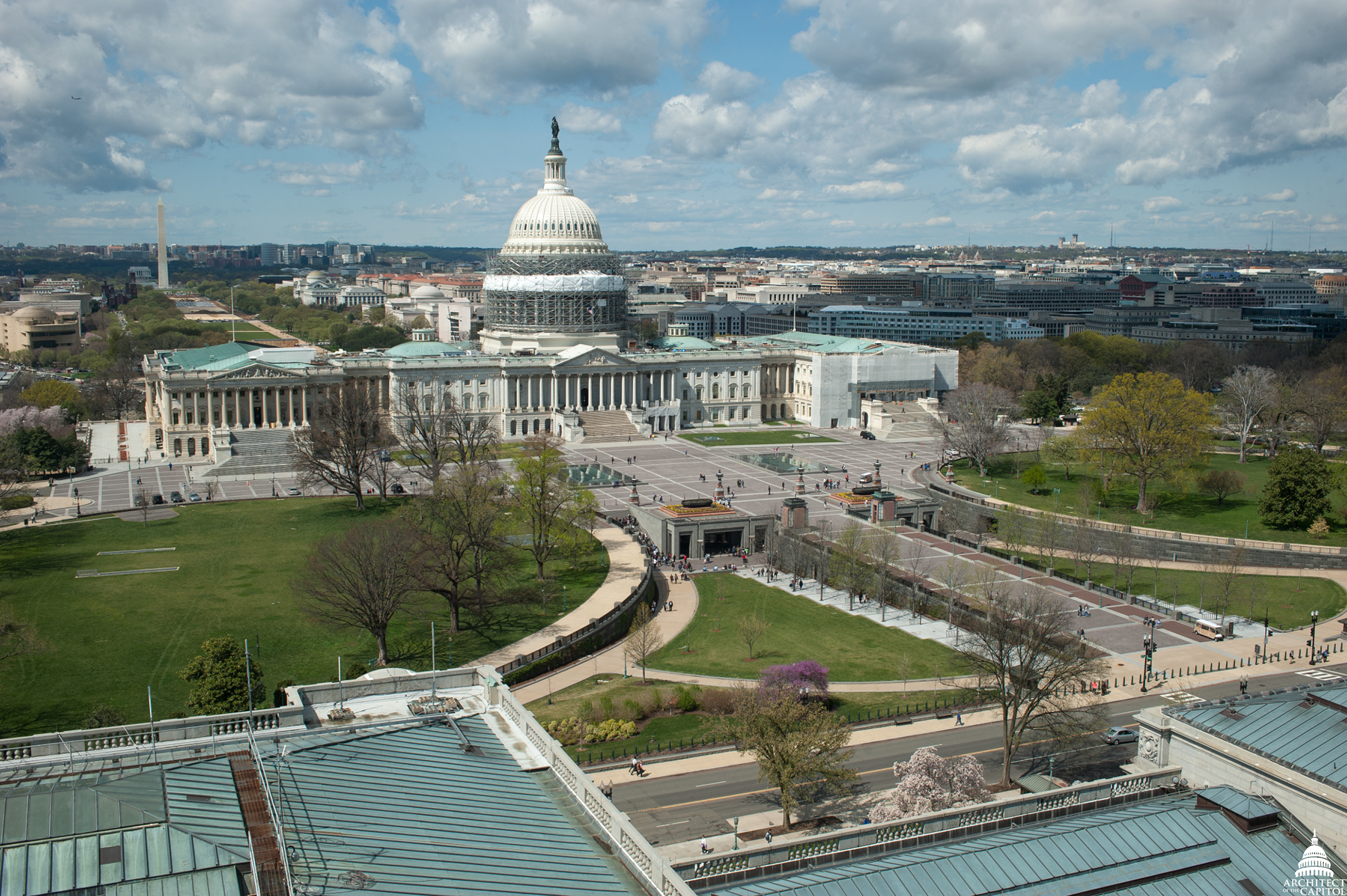
United States Capitol (2016), meeting place of the United States Congress

This list of members of the United States Congress by longevity of service includes representatives and senators who have served for at least 36 years, in the United States Senate, the United States House of Representatives, or both. In cases where there is a tie in time, the following criteria will sort people higher:

1. Achieved time uninterrupted (for total tenure ranks)
2. Achieved time first
3. Senators over representatives (for Senate and House lists)
4. Senate and House seniority

== Key ==
In green	Currently serving
S	Served in the U.S. Senate (for combined categories)
H	Served in the U.S. House (for combined categories)
I	Interruptions in service (for total tenure categories)

== Combined U.S. Senate and U.S. House time ==
Total tenure		Uninterrupted		Name	Party affiliation	State	Reason for leaving	Lifespan
1	59 years, 21 days	1	59 years, 21 days	John Dingell (H)	Democratic	Michigan	Retired	1926–2019
2	57 years, 176 days	2	57 years, 176 days	Robert Byrd (S, H)	Democratic	West Virginia	Died	1917–2010
3	56 years, 319 days	3	56 years, 319 days	Carl Hayden (S, H)	Democratic	Arizona	Retired	1877–1972
4	53 years, 118 days	4	53 years, 118 days	Daniel Inouye (S, H)	Democratic	Hawaii	Died	1924–2012
5	53 years, 60 days	5	53 years, 60 days	Jamie Whitten (H)	Democratic	Mississippi	Retired	1910–1995
6	52 years, 336 days	6	52 years, 336 days	John Conyers (H)	Democratic	Michigan	Resigned	1929–2019
7	51 years, 323 days	7	51 years, 323 days	Chuck Grassley (S, H)	Republican	Iowa		1933–present
8	50 years, 61 days	8	50 years, 61 days	Carl Vinson (H)	Democratic	Georgia	Retired	1883–1981
9	50 years, 20 days	9	50 years, 20 days	Ed Markey (S, H)	Democratic	Massachusetts		1946–present
10	49 years, 305 days	10	49 years, 305 days	Emanuel Celler (H)	Democratic	New York	Lost renomination	1888–1981
11	49 years, 12 days	11	49 years, 12 days	Don Young (H)	Republican	Alaska	Died	1933–2022
12	48 years, 257 days	12	48 years, 257 days	Sam Rayburn (H)	Democratic	Texas	Died	1882–1961
13	48 years, 0 days	13	48 years, 0 days	Patrick Leahy (S)	Democratic	Vermont	Retired	1940–present
14	48 years, 0 days		N/A	Sidney R. Yates (H, I)	Democratic	Illinois	Ran for the U.S. Senate in 1962, lost and came back to the House in 1965, retired at end of term in 1999	1909–2000
15	47 years, 159 days	16	46 years, 57 days	Strom Thurmond (S, I)	Democratic, Republican	South Carolina	Resigned in 1956 to trigger special election, won special election and returned to the Senate, retired at end of term in 2003	1902–2003
16	47 years, 3 days	14	47 years, 3 days	Wright Patman (H)	Democratic	Texas	Died	1893–1976
17	46 years, 292 days	15	46 years, 292 days	Ted Kennedy (S)	Democratic	Massachusetts	Died	1932–2009
18	46 years, 0 days	17	46 years, 0 days	Charles Rangel (H)	Democratic	New York	Retired	1930–2025
19	46 years, 0 days		N/A	Joseph Gurney Cannon (H, I)	Republican	Illinois	Defeated in 1890, came back to the House in 1893, defeated again in 1912, came back to the House in 1915, retired at end of term in 1923	1836–1926
20	45 years, 323 days	18	45 years, 323 days	Ron Wyden (S, H)	Democratic	Oregon		1949–present
21	45 years, 323 days	19	45 years, 323 days	Chuck Schumer (S, H)	Democratic	New York		1950–present
22	45 years, 323 days	20	45 years, 323 days	Hal Rogers (H)	Republican	Kentucky		1937–present
23	45 years, 323 days	21	45 years, 323 days	Chris Smith (H)	Republican	New Jersey		1953–present
24	45 years, 247 days	22	45 years, 247 days	Adolph J. Sabath (H)	Democratic	Illinois	Died	1866–1952
25	45 years, 187 days	23	45 years, 187 days	Steny Hoyer (H)	Democratic	Maryland		1939–present
26	45 years, 142 days	24	45 years, 142 days	J. Lister Hill (S, H)	Democratic	Alabama	Retired	1894–1984
27	45 years, 87 days	25	45 years, 87 days	Thad Cochran (S, H)	Republican	Mississippi	Resigned	1937–2019
28	44 years, 0 days	26	44 years, 0 days	George H. Mahon (H)	Democratic	Texas	Retired	1900–1985
29	44 years, 0 days	27	44 years, 0 days	Warren Magnuson (S, H)	Democratic	Washington	Defeated	1905–1989
30	44 years, 0 days	28	44 years, 0 days	Charles E. Bennett (H)	Democratic	Florida	Retired	1910–2003
31	44 years, 0 days	29	44 years, 0 days	Richard Shelby (S, H)	Democratic, Republican	Alabama	Retired	1934–present
32	43 years, 323 days	30	43 years, 323 days	Dick Durbin (S, H)	Democratic	Illinois		1944–present
33	43 years, 323 days	31	43 years, 323 days	Marcy Kaptur (H)	Democratic	Ohio		1946–present
34	43 years, 299 days	32	43 years, 299 days	Justin S. Morrill (S, H)	Whig, Republican	Vermont	Died	1810–1898
35	43 years, 152 days		N/A	William B. Allison (S, H, I)	Republican	Iowa	Retired from House in 1871, elected to Senate in 1872, died	1829–1908
36	43 years, 110 days	33	43 years, 110 days	Melvin Price (H)	Democratic	Illinois	Died	1905–1988
37	42 years, 288 days	34	42 years, 288 days	Bill Young (H)	Republican	Florida	Died	1930–2013
38	42 years, 241 days	35	42 years, 241 days	Henry M. Jackson (S, H)	Democratic	Washington	Died	1912–1983
39	42 years, 157 days		N/A	Carter Glass (S, H, I)	Democratic	Virginia	Resigned from House in 1918 after being appointed U.S. Secretary of the Treasury, appointed to Senate in 1920, died	1858–1946
40	42 years, 58 days	36	42 years, 58 days	John W. McCormack (H)	Democratic	Massachusetts	Retired	1891–1980
41	42 years, 0 days	37	42 years, 0 days	John Sparkman (S, H)	Democratic	Alabama	Retired	1899–1985
42	42 years, 0 days	38	42 years, 0 days	Jack Brooks (H)	Democratic	Texas	Defeated	1922–2012
43	42 years, 0 days	39	42 years, 0 days	Orrin Hatch (S)	Republican	Utah	Retired	1934–2022
44	42 years, 0 days	40	42 years, 0 days	Jim Sensenbrenner (H)	Republican	Wisconsin	Retired	1943–present
45	41 years, 362 days	41	41 years, 362 days	William R. Poage (H)	Democratic	Texas	Resigned	1899–1987
46	41 years, 323 days	42	41 years, 323 days	Mitch McConnell (S)	Republican	Kentucky		1942–present
47	41 years, 305 days	43	41 years, 305 days	Robert L. Doughton (H)	Democratic	North Carolina	Retired	1863–1954
48	41 years, 305 days	44	41 years, 305 days	Joseph W. Martin Jr. (H)	Republican	Massachusetts	Lost renomination	1884–1968
49	41 years, 276 days	45	41 years, 276 days	Dave Obey (H)	Democratic	Wisconsin	Retired	1938–present
50	41 years, 69 days	46	41 years, 69 days	Clarence Cannon (H)	Democratic	Missouri	Died	1879–1964
51	41 years, 59 days	47	41 years, 59 days	John C. Stennis (S)	Democratic	Mississippi	Retired	1901–1995
52	41 years, 30 days	48	41 years, 30 days	Kenneth McKellar (S, H)	Democratic	Tennessee	Lost renomination	1869–1957
53	40 years, 240 days	49	40 years, 240 days	William Natcher (H)	Democratic	Kentucky	Died	1909–1994
54	40 years, 207 days		N/A	Claude Pepper (S, H, I)	Democratic	Florida	Lost renomination to Senate in 1950, elected to House in 1962, died	1900–1989
55	40 years, 157 days	50	40 years, 157 days	William P. Frye (S, H)	Republican	Maine	Died	1830–1911
56	40 years, 10 days	51	40 years, 10 days	Ted Stevens (S)	Republican	Alaska	Defeated	1923–2010
57	40 years, 0 days	52	40 years, 0 days	Carl Curtis (S, H)	Republican	Nebraska	Retired	1905–2000
58	40 years, 0 days	53	40 years, 0 days	Peter W. Rodino (H)	Democratic	New Jersey	Retired	1909–2005
59	40 years, 0 days	54	40 years, 0 days	Pete Stark (H)	Democratic	California	Defeated	1931–2020
60	40 years, 0 days	55	40 years, 0 days	Tom Harkin (S, H)	Democratic	Iowa	Retired	1939–present
61	40 years, 0 days	56	40 years, 0 days	George Miller (H)	Democratic	California	Retired	1945–present
62	40 years, 0 days	57	40 years, 0 days	Henry Waxman (H)	Democratic	California	Retired	1939–present
63	40 years, 0 days	58	40 years, 0 days	Barbara Mikulski (S, H)	Democratic	Maryland	Retired	1936–present
64	40 years, 0 days	59	40 years, 0 days	Pat Roberts (S, H)	Republican	Kansas	Retired	1936–present
65	40 years, 0 days		N/A	Eugene Hale (S, H, I)	Republican	Maine	Defeated for reelection to House in 1878, elected to Senate in 1880, retired at end of term in 1911	1836–1918
66	39 years, 364 days		N/A	Jennings Randolph (S, H, I)	Democratic	West Virginia	Defeated for reelection to House in 1946, won special election to Senate in 1958, retired at end of term in 1985	1902–1998
67	39 years, 362 days	60	39 years, 362 days	Leslie C. Arends (H)	Republican	Illinois	Retired	1895–1985
68	39 years, 352 days	61	39 years, 352 days	Daniel A. Reed (H)	Republican	New York	Died	1875–1959
69	39 years, 305 days	62	39 years, 305 days	George W. Norris (S, H)	Republican, Independent	Nebraska	Defeated	1861–1944
70	39 years, 305 days	63	39 years, 305 days	John Taber (H)	Republican	New York	Retired	1880–1965
71	39 years, 305 days	64	39 years, 305 days	William M. Colmer (H)	Democratic	Mississippi	Retired	1890–1980
72	39 years, 173 days	65	39 years, 173 days	Nancy Pelosi (H)	Democratic	California		1940–present
73	39 years, 34 days	66	39 years, 34 days	Max Baucus (S, H)	Democratic	Montana	Resigned after being appointed Ambassador to China	1941–present
74	39 years, 9 days		N/A	Samuel Smith (S, H, I)	Democratic-Republican, Democratic	Maryland	Retired from Senate in 1815, won special election to House in 1816, retired from Senate at end of term in 1833	1752–1839
75	38 years, 329 days		N/A	John L. McClellan (S, H, I)	Democratic	Arkansas	Retired from House in 1939, elected to Senate in 1942, died	1896–1977
76	38 years, 145 days	67	38 years, 145 days	Morris Sheppard (S, H)	Democratic	Texas	Died	1875–1941
77	38 years, 55 days	68	38 years, 55 days	Fritz Hollings (S)	Democratic	South Carolina	Retired	1922–2019
78	38 years, 14 days	69	38 years, 14 days	Frank Pallone (H)	Democratic	New Jersey		1951–present
79	38 years, 9 days	70	38 years, 9 days	Richard Russell Jr. (S)	Democratic	Georgia	Died	1897–1971
80	38 years, 4 days		N/A	John Sherman (S, H, I)	Opposition, Republican	Ohio	Resigned from Senate in 1877 after being appointed U.S. Secretary of the Treasury, came back to the Senate in 1881, resigned from Senate in 1897 after being appointed U.S. Secretary of State	1823–1900
81	38 years, 3 days	71	38 years, 3 days	Russell B. Long (S)	Democratic	Louisiana	Retired	1918–2003
82	38 years, 0 days	72	38 years, 0 days	Frederick H. Gillett (S, H)	Republican	Massachusetts	Retired	1851–1935
83	38 years, 0 days	73	38 years, 0 days	Wilbur Mills (H)	Democratic	Arkansas	Retired	1909–1992
84	38 years, 0 days	74	38 years, 0 days	Dante Fascell (H)	Democratic	Florida	Retired	1917–1998
85	38 years, 0 days	75	38 years, 0 days	Robert H. Michel (H)	Republican	Illinois	Retired	1923–2017
86	38 years, 0 days	76	38 years, 0 days	Nick Rahall (H)	Democratic	West Virginia	Defeated	1949–present
87	38 years, 0 days	76	38 years, 0 days	Ben Cardin (S, H)	Democratic	Maryland	Retired	1943–present
88	37 years, 323 days	77	37 years, 323 days	Richard Neal (H)	Democratic	Massachusetts		1949–present
89	37 years, 305 days		N/A	Robert Crosser (H, I)	Democratic	Ohio	Lost renomination in 1918, returned to House in 1921, lost renomination in 1954	1874–1957
90	37 years, 290 days		N/A	Bob Sikes (H, I)	Democratic	Florida	Resigned in 1944 to serve in World War II, returned to the House in 1945, retired at end of term in 1979	1906–1994
91	37 years, 255 days	79	37 years, 255 days	Nathaniel Macon (S, H)	Anti-Administration, Democratic-Republican	North Carolina	Resigned	1757–1837
92	37 years, 250 days	80	37 years, 250 days	Henry Cabot Lodge (S, H)	Republican	Massachusetts	Died	1850–1924
93	37 years, 74 days		N/A	Alben W. Barkley (S, H, I)	Democratic	Kentucky	Resigned from Senate in 1949 after being elected Vice President of the United States, returned to the Senate in 1955, died	1877–1956
94	37 years, 60 days	81	37 years, 60 days	Henry B. González (H)	Democratic	Texas	Retired	1916–2000
95	37 years, 6 days		N/A	Francis E. Warren (S, I)	Republican	Wyoming	Defeated for reelection in 1892, returned to the Senate in 1895, died	1844–1929
96	36 years, 83 days		N/A	James Eastland (S, I)	Democratic	Mississippi	Appointment expired in 1941 after special election, elected in 1942, resigned	1904–1986
97	36 years, 12 days	82	36 years, 12 days	Joe Biden (S)	Democratic	Delaware	Resigned after being elected Vice President of the United States	1942–present
98	36 years, 3 days	83	36 years, 3 days	John Murtha (H)	Democratic	Pennsylvania	Died	1932–2010
99	36 years, 0 days	84	36 years, 0 days	Henry L. Dawes (S, H)	Republican	Massachusetts	Retired	1816–1903
100	36 years, 0 days	85	36 years, 0 days	F. Edward Hébert (H)	Democratic	Louisiana	Retired	1901–1979
101	36 years, 0 days	86	36 years, 0 days	Edward Boland (H)	Democratic	Massachusetts	Retired	1911–2001
102	36 years, 0 days	87	36 years, 0 days	William Broomfield (H)	Republican	Michigan	Retired	1922–2019
103	36 years, 0 days	88	36 years, 0 days	Dan Rostenkowski (H)	Democratic	Illinois	Defeated	1928–2010
104	36 years, 0 days	89	36 years, 0 days	Neal Smith (H)	Democratic	Iowa	Defeated	1920–2021
105	36 years, 0 days	90	36 years, 0 days	Claiborne Pell (S)	Democratic	Rhode Island	Retired	1918–2009
106	36 years, 0 days	91	36 years, 0 days	Joseph M. McDade (H)	Republican	Pennsylvania	Retired	1931–2017
107	36 years, 0 days	92	36 years, 0 days	Paul Sarbanes (S, H)	Democratic	Maryland	Retired	1933–2020
108	36 years, 0 days	93	36 years, 0 days	Pete Domenici (S)	Republican	New Mexico	Retired	1932–2017
109	36 years, 0 days	94	36 years, 0 days	Ralph Regula (H)	Republican	Ohio	Retired	1924–2017
110	36 years, 0 days	95	36 years, 0 days	Chris Dodd (S, H)	Democratic	Connecticut	Retired	1944–present
111	36 years, 0 days	96	36 years, 0 days	Jim Oberstar (H)	Democratic–Farmer–Labor	Minnesota	Defeated	1934–2014
112	36 years, 0 days	97	36 years, 0 days	Richard Lugar (S)	Republican	Indiana	Lost renomination	1932–2019
113	36 years, 0 days	98	36 years, 0 days	Daniel Akaka (S, H)	Democratic	Hawaii	Retired	1924–2018
114	36 years, 0 days	99	36 years, 0 days	Norm Dicks (H)	Democratic	Washington	Retired	1940–present
115	36 years, 0 days	100	36 years, 0 days	Dale Kildee (H)	Democratic	Michigan	Retired	1929–2021
116	36 years, 0 days	101	36 years, 0 days	Carl Levin (S)	Democratic	Michigan	Retired	1934–2021
117	36 years, 0 days	102	36 years, 0 days	Sander Levin (H)	Democratic	Michigan	Retired	1931–present
118	36 years, 0 days	103	36 years, 0 days	Pete Visclosky (H)	Democratic	Indiana	Retired	1949–present
119	36 years, 0 days	104	36 years, 0 days	Jim Inhofe (S, H)	Republican	Oklahoma	Resigned	1934–2024
120	36 years, 0 days	105	36 years, 0 days	Peter DeFazio (H)	Democratic	Oregon	Retired	1947–present
121	36 years, 0 days	106	36 years, 0 days	Fred Upton (H)	Republican	Michigan	Retired	1953–present
122	36 years, 0 days		N/A	Shelby M. Cullom (S, H, I)	Republican	Illinois	Lost renomination to House in 1870, elected to Senate in 1882, retired at end of term in 1913	1829–1914

== U.S. Senate time ==
The 90th Congress was notable because for a period of 10 days (December 24, 1968 – January 3, 1969), it contained within the Senate, all 10 of what was at one point the top 10 longest-serving senators in history (Byrd, Inouye, Thurmond, Kennedy, Hayden, Stennis, Stevens, Hollings, Russell Jr., and Long) until January 7, 2013, when Patrick Leahy surpassed Russell B. Long as the 10th longest-serving senator in history. This short 10-day period stretched from the appointment of Ted Stevens of Alaska to fill a vacancy, to the retirement of Carl Hayden of Arizona early the next year. The 107th Congress (2001–2003) was the most recent one to contain the top 7 longest serving senators in history (Byrd, Inouye, Leahy, Thurmond, Kennedy, Grassley, and Hatch).

The 99th Congress (1985–1987) and the 100th Congress (1987–1989) were the periods in which most people from this list were serving together (all but Hayden, Russell Jr., Warren, Eastland, Magnuson, and Shelby in the former and all but Hayden, Russell Jr., Long, Warren, Eastland, and Magnuson in the latter).

In 2008, Ted Stevens became the longest serving senator to lose reelection.

Total tenure		Uninterrupted		Name	Party affiliation	State	Dates of service	Lifespan
1	51 years, 176 days	1	51 years, 176 days	Robert Byrd	Democratic	West Virginia	January 3, 1959 – June 28, 2010	1917–2010
2	49 years, 349 days	2	49 years, 349 days	Daniel Inouye	Democratic	Hawaii	January 3, 1963 – December 17, 2012	1924–2012
3	48 years, 0 days	3	48 years, 0 days	Patrick Leahy	Democratic	Vermont	January 3, 1975 – January 3, 2023	1940–present
4	47 years, 159 days	5	46 years, 57 days	Strom Thurmond (I)	Democratic, Republican	South Carolina	December 24, 1954 – April 7, 1956; November 7, 1956 – January 3, 2003	1902–2003
5	46 years, 292 days	4	46 years, 292 days	Ted Kennedy	Democratic	Massachusetts	November 7, 1962 – August 25, 2009	1932–2009
6	45 years, 323 days	6	45 years, 323 days	Chuck Grassley	Republican	Iowa	Since January 3, 1981	1933–present
7	42 years, 0 days	7	42 years, 0 days	Orrin Hatch	Republican	Utah	January 3, 1977 – January 3, 2019	1934–2022
8	41 years, 323 days	8	41 years, 323 days	Mitch McConnell	Republican	Kentucky	Since January 3, 1985	1942–present
9	41 years, 305 days	9	41 years, 305 days	Carl Hayden	Democratic	Arizona	March 4, 1927 – January 3, 1969	1877–1972
10	41 years, 59 days	10	41 years, 59 days	John C. Stennis	Democratic	Mississippi	November 5, 1947 – January 3, 1989	1901–1995
11	40 years, 10 days	11	40 years, 10 days	Ted Stevens	Republican	Alaska	December 24, 1968 – January 3, 2009	1923–2010
12	39 years, 94 days	12	39 years, 94 days	Thad Cochran	Republican	Mississippi	December 27, 1978 – April 1, 2018	1937–2019
13	38 years, 55 days	13	38 years, 55 days	Fritz Hollings	Democratic	South Carolina	November 9, 1966 – January 3, 2005	1922–2019
14	38 years, 9 days	14	38 years, 9 days	Richard Russell Jr.	Democratic	Georgia	January 12, 1933 – January 21, 1971	1897–1971
15	38 years, 3 days	15	38 years, 3 days	Russell B. Long	Democratic	Louisiana	December 31, 1948 – January 3, 1987	1918–2003
16	37 years, 6 days		N/A	Francis E. Warren (I)	Republican	Wyoming	November 24, 1890 – March 3, 1893; March 4, 1895 – November 24, 1929	1844–1929
17	36 years, 83 days		N/A	James Eastland (I)	Democratic	Mississippi	June 30 – September 28, 1941; January 3, 1943 – December 27, 1978	1904–1986
18	36 years, 20 days	16	36 years, 20 days	Warren Magnuson	Democratic	Washington	December 14, 1944 – January 3, 1981	1905–1989
19	36 years, 12 days	17	36 years, 12 days	Joe Biden	Democratic	Delaware	January 3, 1973 – January 15, 2009	1942–present
20	36 years, 0 days	18	36 years, 0 days	Claiborne Pell	Democratic	Rhode Island	January 3, 1961 – January 3, 1997	1918–2009
21	36 years, 0 days	19	36 years, 0 days	Pete Domenici	Republican	New Mexico	January 3, 1973 – January 3, 2009	1932–2017
22	36 years, 0 days	20	36 years, 0 days	Richard Lugar	Republican	Indiana	January 3, 1977 – January 3, 2013	1932–2019
23	36 years, 0 days	21	36 years, 0 days	Carl Levin	Democratic	Michigan	January 3, 1979 – January 3, 2015	1934–2021
24	36 years, 0 days	22	36 years, 0 days	Richard Shelby	Democratic, Republican	Alabama	January 3, 1987 – January 3, 2023	1934–present

== U.S. House time ==
Total tenure		Uninterrupted		Name	Party affiliation	State	Dates of service	Lifespan
1	59 years, 21 days	1	59 years, 21 days	John Dingell	Democratic	Michigan	December 13, 1955 – January 3, 2015	1926–2019
2	53 years, 60 days	2	53 years, 60 days	Jamie Whitten	Democratic	Mississippi	November 4, 1941 – January 3, 1995	1910–1995
3	52 years, 336 days	3	52 years, 336 days	John Conyers	Democratic	Michigan	January 3, 1965 – December 5, 2017	1929–2019
4	50 years, 61 days	4	50 years, 61 days	Carl Vinson	Democratic	Georgia	November 3, 1914 – January 3, 1965	1883–1981
5	49 years, 305 days	5	49 years, 305 days	Emanuel Celler	Democratic	New York	March 4, 1923 – January 3, 1973	1888–1981
6	49 years, 12 days	6	49 years, 12 days	Don Young	Republican	Alaska	March 6, 1973 – March 18, 2022	1933–2022
7	48 years, 257 days	7	48 years, 257 days	Sam Rayburn	Democratic	Texas	March 4, 1913 – November 16, 1961	1882–1961
8	48 years, 0 days		N/A	Sidney R. Yates (I)	Democratic	Illinois	January 3, 1949 – January 3, 1963; January 3, 1965 – January 3, 1999	1909–2000
9	47 years, 3 days	8	47 years, 3 days	Wright Patman	Democratic	Texas	March 4, 1929 – March 7, 1976	1893–1976
10	46 years, 0 days	9	46 years, 0 days	Charles Rangel	Democratic	New York	January 3, 1971 – January 3, 2017	1930–2025
11	46 years, 0 days		N/A	Joseph Gurney Cannon (I)	Republican	Illinois	March 4, 1873 – March 3, 1891; March 4, 1893 – March 3, 1913; March 4, 1915 – March 3, 1923	1836–1926
12	45 years, 323 days	10	45 years, 323 days	Hal Rogers	Republican	Kentucky	Since January 3, 1981	1937–present
13	45 years, 323 days	11	45 years, 323 days	Chris Smith	Republican	New Jersey	Since January 3, 1981	1953–present
14	45 years, 247 days	12	45 years, 247 days	Adolph J. Sabath	Democratic	Illinois	March 4, 1907 – November 6, 1952	1866–1952
15	45 years, 187 days	13	45 years, 187 days	Steny Hoyer	Democratic	Maryland	Since May 19, 1981	1939–present
16	44 years, 0 days	14	44 years, 0 days	George H. Mahon	Democratic	Texas	January 3, 1935 – January 3, 1979	1900–1985
17	44 years, 0 days	15	44 years, 0 days	Charles E. Bennett	Democratic	Florida	January 3, 1949 – January 3, 1993	1910–2003
18	43 years, 323 days	16	43 years, 323 days	Marcy Kaptur	Democratic	Ohio	Since January 3, 1983	1946–present
19	43 years, 110 days	17	43 years, 110 days	Melvin Price	Democratic	Illinois	January 3, 1945 – April 22, 1988	1905–1988
20	42 years, 288 days	18	42 years, 288 days	Bill Young	Republican	Florida	January 3, 1971 – October 18, 2013	1930–2013
21	42 years, 58 days	19	42 years, 58 days	John W. McCormack	Democratic	Massachusetts	November 6, 1928 – January 3, 1971	1891–1980
22	42 years, 0 days	20	42 years, 0 days	Jack Brooks	Democratic	Texas	January 3, 1953 – January 3, 1995	1922–2012
23	42 years, 0 days	21	42 years, 0 days	Jim Sensenbrenner	Republican	Wisconsin	January 3, 1979 – January 3, 2021	1943–present
24	41 years, 362 days	22	41 years, 362 days	William R. Poage	Democratic	Texas	January 3, 1937 – December 31, 1978	1899–1987
25	41 years, 305 days	23	41 years, 305 days	Robert L. Doughton	Democratic	North Carolina	March 4, 1911 – January 3, 1953	1863–1954
26	41 years, 305 days	24	41 years, 305 days	Joseph W. Martin Jr.	Republican	Massachusetts	March 4, 1925 – January 3, 1967	1884–1968
27	41 years, 276 days	25	41 years, 276 days	Dave Obey	Democratic	Wisconsin	April 1, 1969 – January 3, 2011	1938–present
28	41 years, 69 days	26	41 years, 69 days	Clarence Cannon	Democratic	Missouri	March 4, 1923 – May 12, 1964	1879–1964
29	40 years, 240 days	27	40 years, 240 days	William Natcher	Democratic	Kentucky	August 1, 1953 – March 29, 1994	1909–1994
30	40 years, 0 days	28	40 years, 0 days	Peter W. Rodino	Democratic	New Jersey	January 3, 1949 – January 3, 1989	1909–2005
31	40 years, 0 days	29	40 years, 0 days	Pete Stark	Democratic	California	January 3, 1973 – January 3, 2013	1931–2020
32	40 years, 0 days	30	40 years, 0 days	George Miller	Democratic	California	January 3, 1975 – January 3, 2015	1945–present
33	40 years, 0 days	31	40 years, 0 days	Henry Waxman	Democratic	California	January 3, 1975 – January 3, 2015	1939–present
34	39 years, 362 days	32	39 years, 362 days	Leslie C. Arends	Republican	Illinois	January 3, 1935 – December 31, 1974	1895–1985
35	39 years, 352 days	33	39 years, 352 days	Daniel A. Reed	Republican	New York	March 4, 1919 – February 19, 1959	1875–1959
36	39 years, 305 days	34	39 years, 305 days	John Taber	Republican	New York	March 4, 1923 – January 3, 1963	1880–1965
37	39 years, 305 days	35	39 years, 305 days	William M. Colmer	Democratic	Mississippi	March 4, 1933 – January 3, 1973	1890–1980
38	39 years, 173 days	36	39 years, 173 days	Nancy Pelosi	Democratic	California	Since June 2, 1987	1940–present
39	38 years, 14 days	37	38 years, 14 days	Frank Pallone	Democratic	New Jersey	Since November 8, 1988	1951–present
40	38 years, 0 days	38	38 years, 0 days	Wilbur Mills	Democratic	Arkansas	January 3, 1939 – January 3, 1977	1909–1992
41	38 years, 0 days	39	38 years, 0 days	Dante Fascell	Democratic	Florida	January 3, 1955 – January 3, 1993	1917–1998
42	38 years, 0 days	40	38 years, 0 days	Robert H. Michel	Republican	Illinois	January 3, 1957 – January 3, 1995	1923–2017
43	38 years, 0 days	41	38 years, 0 days	Nick Rahall	Democratic	West Virginia	January 3, 1977 – January 3, 2015	1949–present
44	37 years, 323 days	42	37 years, 323 days	Richard Neal	Democratic	Massachusetts	Since January 3, 1989	1949–present
45	37 years, 305 days		N/A	Robert Crosser (I)	Democratic	Ohio	March 4, 1913 – March 3, 1919; March 4, 1923 – January 3, 1955	1874–1957
46	37 years, 290 days		N/A	Bob Sikes (I)	Democratic	Florida	January 3, 1941 – October 19, 1944; January 3, 1945 – January 3, 1979	1906–1994
47	37 years, 60 days	43	37 years, 60 days	Henry B. González	Democratic	Texas	November 4, 1961 – January 3, 1999	1916–2000
48	36 years, 256 days	44	36 years, 256 days	Ed Markey	Democratic	Massachusetts	November 2, 1976 – July 15, 2013	1946–present
49	36 years, 3 days	45	36 years, 3 days	John Murtha	Democratic	Pennsylvania	February 5, 1974 – February 8, 2010	1932–2010
50	36 years, 0 days	46	36 years, 0 days	F. Edward Hébert	Democratic	Louisiana	January 3, 1941 – January 3, 1977	1901–1979
51	36 years, 0 days	47	36 years, 0 days	Edward Boland	Democratic	Massachusetts	January 3, 1953 – January 3, 1989	1911–2001
52	36 years, 0 days	48	36 years, 0 days	William Broomfield	Republican	Michigan	January 3, 1957 – January 3, 1993	1922–2019
53	36 years, 0 days	49	36 years, 0 days	Dan Rostenkowski	Democratic	Illinois	January 3, 1959 – January 3, 1995	1928–2010
54	36 years, 0 days	50	36 years, 0 days	Neal Smith	Democratic	Iowa	January 3, 1959 – January 3, 1995	1920–2021
55	36 years, 0 days	51	36 years, 0 days	Joseph M. McDade	Republican	Pennsylvania	January 3, 1963 – January 3, 1999	1931–2017
56	36 years, 0 days	52	36 years, 0 days	Ralph Regula	Republican	Ohio	January 3, 1973 – January 3, 2009	1924–2017
57	36 years, 0 days	53	36 years, 0 days	Jim Oberstar	Democratic–Farmer–Labor	Minnesota	January 3, 1975 – January 3, 2011	1934–2014
58	36 years, 0 days	54	36 years, 0 days	Norm Dicks	Democratic	Washington	January 3, 1977 – January 3, 2013	1940–present
59	36 years, 0 days	55	36 years, 0 days	Dale Kildee	Democratic	Michigan	January 3, 1977 – January 3, 2013	1929–2021
60	36 years, 0 days	56	36 years, 0 days	Sander Levin	Democratic	Michigan	January 3, 1983 – January 3, 2019	1931–present
61	36 years, 0 days	57	36 years, 0 days	Pete Visclosky	Democratic	Indiana	January 3, 1985 – January 3, 2021	1949–present
62	36 years, 0 days	58	36 years, 0 days	Peter DeFazio	Democratic	Oregon	January 3, 1987 – January 3, 2023	1947–present
63	36 years, 0 days	59	36 years, 0 days	Fred Upton	Republican	Michigan	January 3, 1987 – January 3, 2023	1953–present

== See also ==
- List of members of the United States Congress by brevity of service
- List of historical longest-serving members of the United States Congress
