= Alice Minnie Herts =

American theatre professional

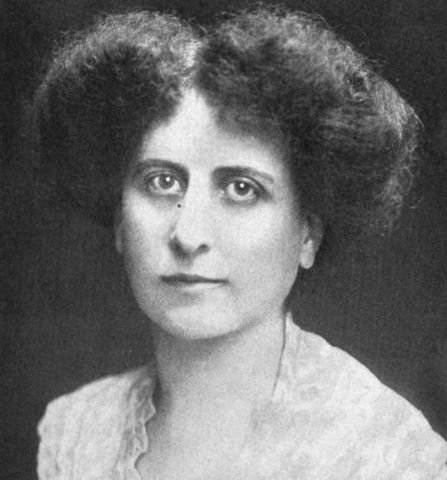
- Herts in her 1911 book Children's Educational Theatre
- Born: c. 1870; New York City, New York, USA
- Died: September 28, 1933 (aged 62–63)
- Education: Normal College, New York City; University of Paris
- Known for: Founder and manager of the Children's Educational Theatre
- Spouse: Jacob Heniger (m. 1913)

Alice Minnie Herts (c. 1870 – September 28, 1933), sometimes seen as A. Minnie Hertz-Heniger, was an American theatre professional, founder and manager of the Children's Educational Theatre in New York. Mark Twain said of Herts's theatrical work, "I consider it the greatest citizen-making force of the century."

== Early life and education ==
Herts was born in New York City, the daughter of Henry B. and Esther Moss Herts. She attended Public School No. 47 before pursuing teacher training at the Normal College, New York City, and the Sorbonne in Paris.

== Career ==
Herts started as a social worker with the Educational Alliance, and in 1903 founded the Children's Educational Theatre in New York City, "to make our thousands of immigrant children better citizens; to educate them; to develop their sympathies and their characters; to give them the best possible sort of a good time, and to counteract the evil and sordid influences of tenement and factory." She recruited Mark Twain to serve as president of the theatre board, and Emma Sheridan Fry served as director of the productions until 1909. The program produced or adapted works by Mary Hunter Austin, Lady Gregory, Frances Hodgson Burnett, and other writers.

Her book, The Children's Educational Theatre (1911) laid out the mission and educational bases of her project, as well as the practical aspects of creating a theatre program for children. A later book by Herts, The Kingdom of the Child (1918), explored similar themes.

By 1917 Herts held a faculty appointment at Columbia University. She also made a lecture tour and spoke at national meetings, including the Drama League convention in Pittsburgh in 1917.

From the early 1920s Herts and her husband Jacob Heniger ran a summer camp in Casco, Maine. The site is now known as "Heniger Park."

== Personal life ==
Herts married Jacob Heniger in 1913. She died in 1933, in her 60s.

Hunter College offers an Alice Minnie Hertz Heniger Scholarship to "a student pursuing a course in music, drama, or literature, with the primary purpose of benefiting children." Lehman College English Department also offers an Alice Minnie Hertz Heniger Scholarship for Children's Literature.
