= Emma Sheridan Fry =

American actor, playwright, and teacher

Emma V. Sheridan Fry
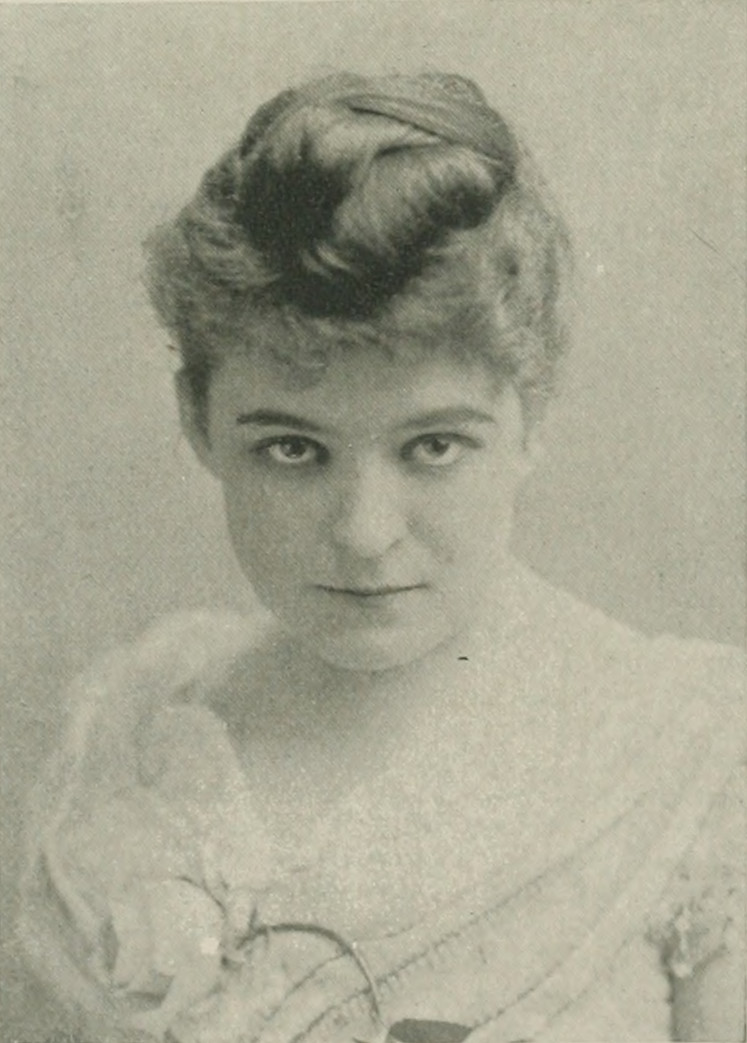
- Photo in A Woman of the Century
- Born: Emma Viola Sheridan; October 1, 1864; Painesville, Ohio, U.S.
- Died: December 12, 1936; Westwood, New Jersey, U.S.
- Education: New York Lyceum School of Acting, American Academy Dramatic Arts
- Occupation: journalist
- Spouse: Alfred Brooks Fry (m. 1891)
- Children: Sheridan Brooks Fry
- Relatives: George Augustus Sheridan (father)
- Writing career
- Pen name: Polly, E. V. Sheridan
- Language: English
- Subject: drama
- Notable work: Educational dramatics

Emma Sheridan Fry (née, Sheridan; pen name, Polly and E. V. Sheridan; October 1, 1864 – December 11, 1936) was an American actress, playwright, and teacher. She started her career as a stage actress, and after retiring from that, she became a writer for various periodicals and wrote plays. In 1903, she established the Children's and Young People's Theatre in New York City. Also in that city, she served as director of the Children's Educational Theatre and the Educational Players, as well as teaching at the American Academy of Dramatic Arts.

== Early life and education ==
Emma Viola Sheridan was born in Painesville, Ohio, October 1, 1864. Her mother, Emma Christina (Huther) Sheridan, was a niece of the New England clergyman, Rev. Joseph W. Parker. Her father, Congressman George Augustus Sheridan, fought with the Army of the Cumberland during the American Civil War, and later developed a national reputation as an orator. Fry was always his friend, confidant and counselor.

She was a graduate of Mrs. Hay's preparatory academy, Boston, Massachusetts, and of the Normal College in New York City (now, Hunter College). Choosing the stage as the field of her work, she went through a thorough course of study and training in the New York Lyceum School of Acting (now, Lyceum Theatre). She graduated from the American Academy of Dramatic Arts in 1885.

== Career ==
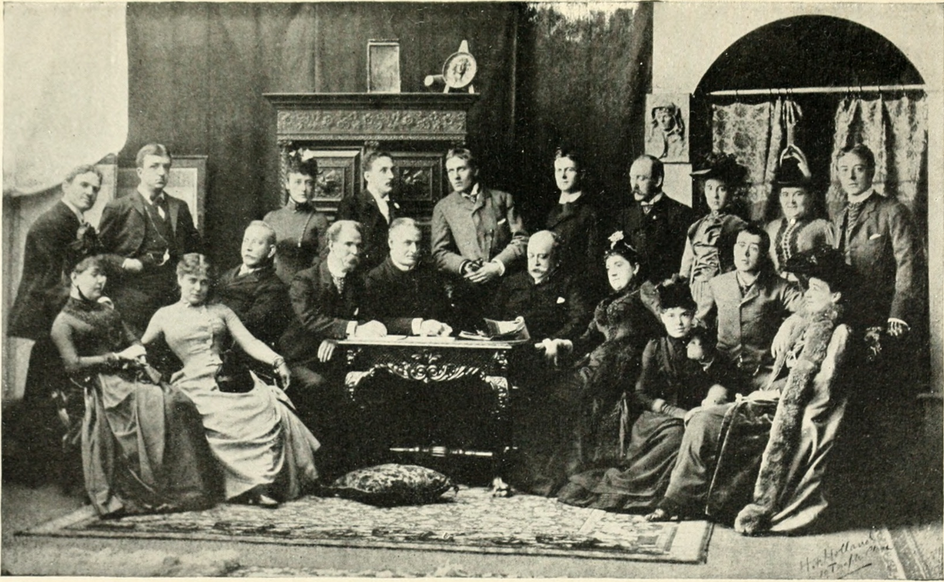
Emma Sheridan (seated, 2nd from left) and the Boston Museum Stock Company, 1889-1890

Fry began at the bottom and in six seasons, she rose to the front rank among American actors, filling many important roles. In 1887, she played a notable engagement with Richard Mansfield in the Lyceum Theatre, London, England. Returning to the United States, she played a round of leading Shakespearean parts with Thomas Keene. In 1889, she became the leading lady in the Boston Museum Company. At the close of her second and most successful season there, her stage career was cut short by her marriage.

During her stage experience, Sheridan was also a writer of general syndicate newspaper work, writing many articles, stories, and verses published in the daily press, in magazines, and in dramatic papers over her signature. She was well known as "Polly" in the New York Dramatic Mirror, writing the Polly Papers. She also wrote a "Wednesday Afternoon" column for the Boston Commonwealth, which included theater reviews and dramatic commentary. After she retired from the stage, Sheridan, for she retained her signature, "E. V. Sheridan", devoted all her time to writing, and she was in this second profession rapidly repeating the progress and notable success of her stage career.

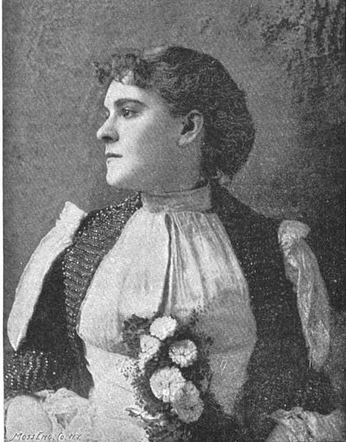
Emma Sheridan Fry (1893)

On February 23, 1892, Mansfield produced at the Garden Theatre, New York, a play by Sheridan entitled, £10,000 a Year, founded on Dr. Samuel Warren's book of the same name, Ten Thousand a-Year. She prepared a text book of Educational Dramatics, and Educational Players' Students Arrangement of Twelfth Night and Macbeth.

Founded by Alice Minnie Herts, and with Mark Twain as president of the board, Fry became the director of the Children's Educational Theatre, New York City, in 1904, and conducted all of its educational work till January 1, 1909. She took charge, as dramatic director, of the Educational Players, New York City, in 1910. She was also a teacher at the American Academy of Dramatic Arts, 1909-10. At the Children's Educational Tbeatre, she produced The Prince and the Pauper, written by her from Mark Twain's book; the Abby Sage Richardson play, produced with the Educational Players, 1910; Midsummer Night's Dream at the Morris High School, New York; and produced The Tempest for Smith College alumnae, 1898.

Fry was a member of the New England Woman's Press Association, and the Pen and Brush Club, New York City. She served as president of the Alumni Association of the Lyceum School of Acting.

== Personal life and death ==
In 1891, in Deer Isle, Maine, she married Alfred Brooks Fry, Chief Engineer of the United States Treasury service; he was a member of the Loyal Legion, and of the Order of the Cincinnati by heredity. They had a son, Sheridan Brooks Fry, who was born in 1893.

Fry favored women's suffrage. By religion, she was Episcopalian.

Fry died on December 11, 1936 in Westwood, New Jersey at the age of 72. She had been suffering from tuberculosis.

== Selected works ==
=== Plays ===
- £10,000 a Year, 1892
- The Prince and the Pauper

=== Textbooks ===
- Educational dramatics : a handbook on the educational player method, 1917
