= Naval and Military Order of the Spanish War =

American military society

The Naval and Military Order of the Spanish War was a short lived military society formed by American officers who had served during the Spanish–American War.

== History ==
The Naval and Military Order of the Spanish-American War (NMOSAW) was founded on February 2, 1899 in New York City by Lieutenant Walter J. Sears, USN. There were 98 charter members. Colonel Theodore Roosevelt, then Governor of New York, was elected as the Order's first president.

By 1908 the Order had over 1,200 members and was active in the era prior to World War I. It seems to have ceased to exist prior to 1936, as the last National Bulletin of the Order was published in 1935.

Unlike, similar organizations—such as the Society of the Cincinnati, Military Order of the Loyal Legion of the United States and the Military Order of Foreign Wars—it was unable to attract the descendants of it original members in order to perpetuate its existence. This was probably due to the relatively few individuals eligible to join the organization.

== Notable members ==
- Captain Larz Anderson, USV – ambassador and socialite
- Rear Admiral John R. Bartlett, USN – oceanographer
- Major Perry Belmont, USV – son of financier August Belmont
- Rear Admiral Bradley A. Fiske, USN
- Rear Admiral William M. Folger, USN
- Captain Alfred Brooks Fry, USNR – engineer
- Rear Admiral Richmond P. Hobson, USN – Medal of Honor recipient
- Colonel Theodore Roosevelt, USV – President of the United States and Medal of Honor recipient
- Captain Worth G. Ross, USRCS – Commandant of the Revenue Cutter Service
