= 1917 Darwin by-election =

30 June 1917
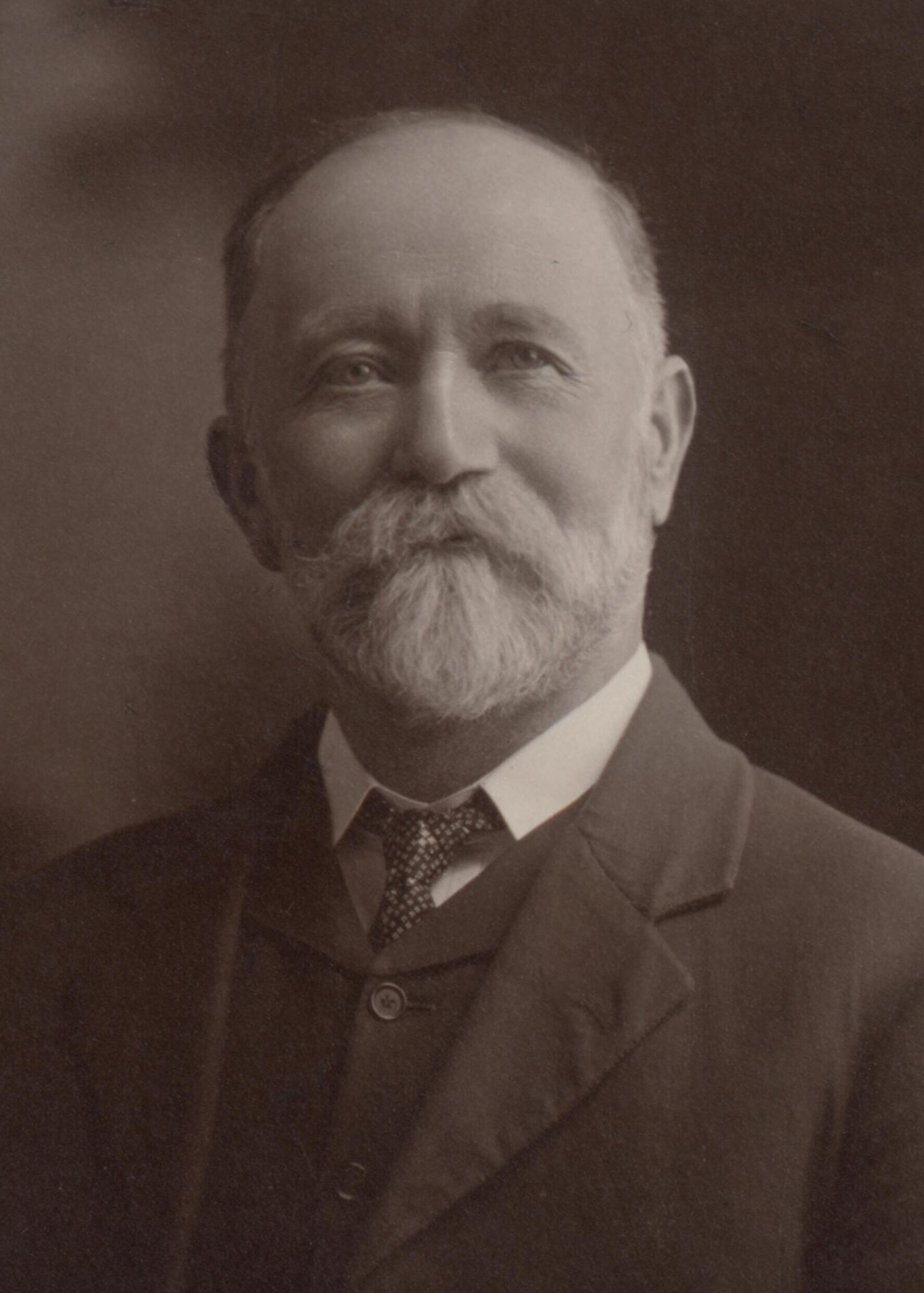
	First party	Second party
		ALP
Candidate	William Spence	James Hurst
Party	Nationalist	Labor
First preference vote	6,665	5,225
Percentage	56.06%	43.94%
Swing	▼2.73pp	▲2.73pp
MP before election
Charles Howroyd
Nationalist
Elected MP
Nationalist

A by-election was held for the Australian House of Representatives seat of Darwin on 30 June 1917. This was triggered by the death of Nationalist MP Charles Howroyd.

The by-election was won by Nationalist candidate William Spence, who had been defeated in his own seat of Darling at the 1917 election.

== Results ==
1917 Darwin by-election
Party	Candidate	Votes	%	±%
Nationalist	William Spence	6,665	56.06	−2.73
Labor	James Hurst	5,225	43.94	+2.73
Total formal votes		11,890	99.60	+2.13
Informal votes		48	0.40	−2.13
Registered electors		19,300		
Turnout		11,938	61.85	−21.30
Nationalist hold		Swing	−2.73	
