= William M. Levy =

American judge (1827–1882)

William Mallory Levy
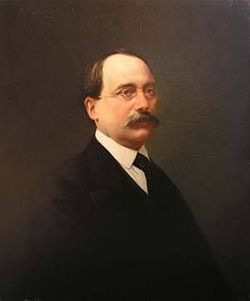

Member of the U.S. House of Representatives from Louisiana's 4th district
- In office March 4, 1875 – March 3, 1877
- Preceded by: George Luke Smith
- Succeeded by: Joseph Barton Elam

Personal details
- Born: William Mallory Levy; October 31, 1827 Isle of Wight, Virginia, U.S.
- Died: August 14, 1882 (aged 54) Saratoga, New York, U.S.
- Resting place: American Cemetery, Natchitoches, Louisiana, U.S.
- Party: Democratic

Military service
- Allegiance: United States of America; Confederate States of America
- Branch/service: Confederate States Army
- Rank: Major
- Unit: 2nd Louisiana Infantry
- Battles/wars: Mexican–American War; American Civil War

William Mallory Levy (October 31, 1827 – August 14, 1882) was an American lawyer, jurist and Confederate Civil War veteran who served one term as a U.S. representative from Louisiana from 1875 to 1877.

== Life and career ==
Born in Isle of Wight, Virginia, the son of John B. Levy, Levy completed preparatory studies. He graduated from the College of William and Mary, Williamsburg, Virginia, in 1844.

=== Civil War ===
He served in the Mexican War, as second lieutenant in Company F, First Regiment, Virginia Volunteers. He served in the Confederate States Army during the Civil War. Commissioned captain of Company A, Second Louisiana Infantry, May 11, 1861. He subsequently served as a major in the Adjutant General's Department.

=== Early political career ===
He studied law. He was admitted to the bar in 1851 and commenced practice in Norfolk, Virginia. He moved to Natchitoches, Louisiana, in 1852 and continued the practice of law. He served as member of the State house of representatives 1859–1861. He was a Democratic Presidential Elector, 1860.

=== Congress ===
Levy was elected as a Democrat to the Forty-fourth Congress (March 4, 1875 – March 3, 1877).

He was an unsuccessful candidate for renomination in 1876.

According to The Jews of Capitol Hill which cites The New York Times January 6, 1876: "Representative Levy played a leading role in the compromise that ended Democratic filibustering aimed at preventing the House's certification of the presidential election in Hayes' favor. Levy was able to effect a political trade-off: the Louisiana board of elections would cast the state's electoral votes in favor of Republican Hayes in exchange for the declaration that Democratic candidate Francis T. Nicholls had defeated Republican Stephen B. Packwood in an equally disputed election for Louisiana governor. History records that Louisiana did deliver its votes for Republican Hayes and the Democrats did take back the state government, effectively ending Reconstruction in the state."

"As a so-called lame duck, Levy became actively involved in the Tilden-Hayes controversy. Prior to 2000, the 1876 election was termed the most fiercely disputed election in American History." "With Electoral College votes of four states in dispute, which compromised twenty electoral ballots, there followed sixteen weeks of heated controversy. This was finally resolved on Monday, March 5, 1877, three days before the scheduled inauguration by an ad hoc election commission created by Congress and consisting of five Supreme Court justices, five Senators, and five House Members. This electoral commission by an eight to seven margin, awarded all of the contested twenty electoral ballots to Hayes, allowing the Republicans to win the presidency by one electoral vote, 185-184. Thus Rutherford B. Hayes became the nineteenth President of the United States."

The Compromise of 1877 effectively ended Reconstruction and pulled US Marshalls out of the former Confederate States in the South. This compromise brokered by Representative William M. Levy, set American Freedmen back politically 100 years and ushered in the Jim Crow era.

=== Later career ===
After leaving Congress, he served as member of the State constitutional convention in 1879. He was appointed associate justice of the State supreme court in 1879 and served until his death.

=== Death and burial ===
Levy died in Saratoga, New York on August 14, 1882.

His funeral was in the Protestant Episcopal Church in Natchitoches, Louisiana, and he was interred in the American Cemetery there.

== See also ==
- List of Jewish members of the United States Congress

U.S. House of Representatives
| Preceded by George L. Smith | Member of the U.S. House of Representatives from Louisiana's 4th congressional district 1875 – 1877 | Succeeded by Joseph B. Elam |
