= Samuel Peters (Louisiana politician) =

American politician (1835–1873)

Member-elect of the U.S. House of Representatives from Louisiana's 4th district
- Died before assuming office
- Preceded by: Alexander Boarman (as member)
- Succeeded by: George Luke Smith (as member)

Personal details
- Born: c. 1835 Clinton, Ohio, U.S.
- Died: October 1, 1873 (aged 37–38) Shreveport, Louisiana, U.S.
- Cause of death: Yellow fever
- Party: Republican
- Education: Liber College
- Occupation: Educator, banker, politician

Samuel H. Peters (c. 1835 – October 1, 1873) was an American businessman and politician from Louisiana. A Republican, he was elected to the United States House of Representatives for Louisiana's 4th congressional district in 1872, but he died from complications caused by yellow fever shortly before he was due to take office. If Peters had lived long enough to have taken office officially, he would have been the first African American to serve in the United States House of Representatives from Louisiana.

== Biography ==
Samuel Peters was born in about 1835 in Clinton County, Ohio. He worked as a farm laborer to save enough money to attend school. He became one of the first African Americans to attend Liber College in Jay County, Indiana. While in Ohio, Peters became a principal for a school for African Americans in Dayton. He was part of a group of black voters who were forcibly turned away from the polls while trying to vote in Dayton.

In 1870, Peters moved to Shreveport, Louisiana, to oversee schools in the region. Within months of his arrival, he was appointed as cashier for the local branch of the Freedman's Savings Bank, a private bank chartered to serve newly emancipated people in the South. In March 1872, Governor P. B. S. Pinchback appointed Peters to the additional office of Shreveport division superintendent of education.

Despite these job posts, Peters contemplated returning to Ohio in fear for his safety, but the Louisiana Republican Party reaffirmed his stay in Louisiana by nominating him for Louisiana's 4th congressional district in 1872. Peters won the election in 1872, garnering 64% of the vote. However, those who won a position in the election of 1872 would have to wait thirteen months—until December 1873—to be sworn in officially. This delay compelled Peters to remain in Shreveport in the meantime to continue working at the Freedman's Bank. Less than a month and a half before he was set to be sworn in for the 43rd Congress, Peters contracted yellow fever, which had spread through Shreveport, and he died on October 1, 1873. He died so suddenly that he did not leave behind the combination to the bank safe, which held $12,000.

A special election took place to fill Peters's term of office, and Republican George Luke Smith was elected.
