= Charles Howroyd =

Australian politician (1867–1917)

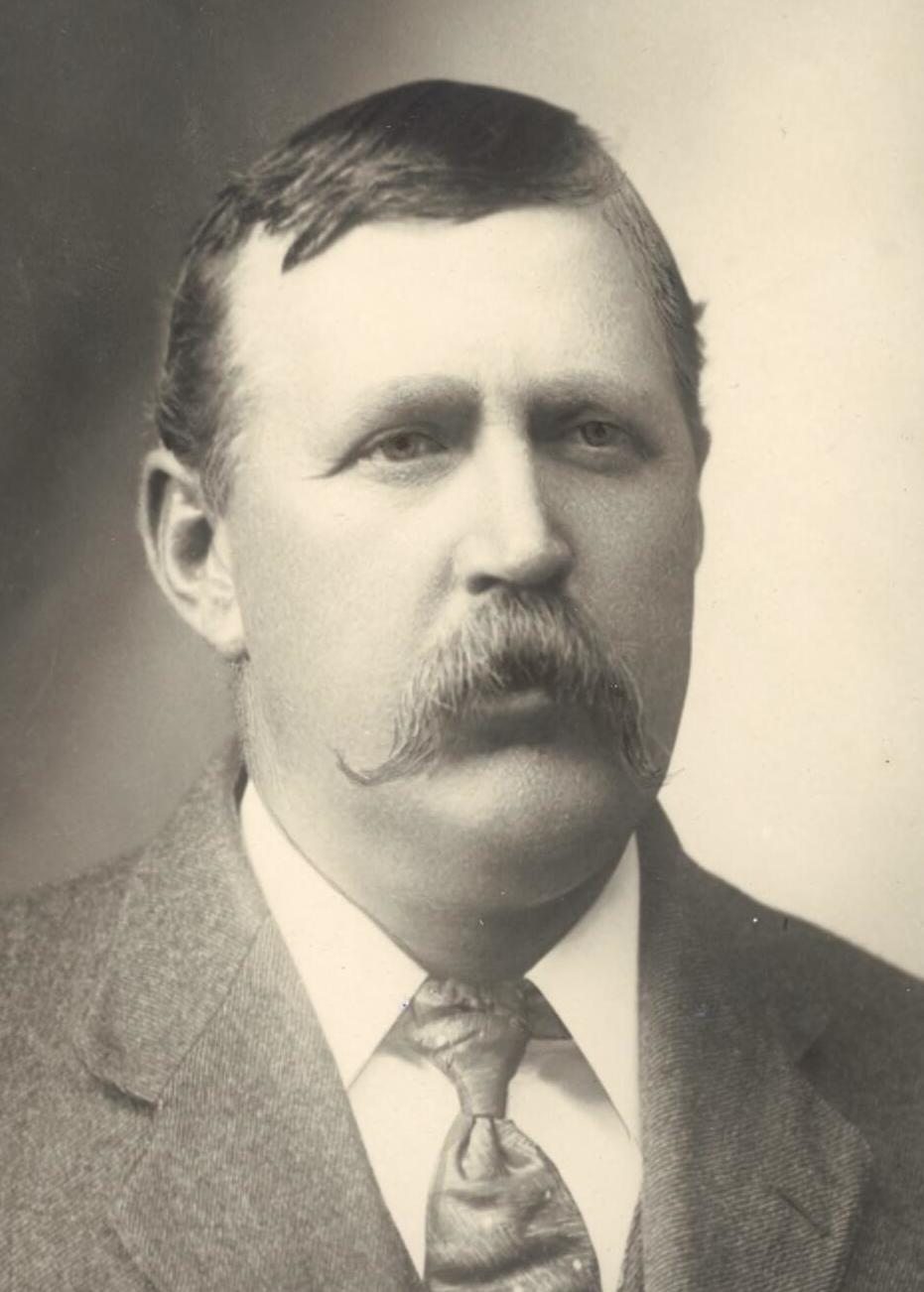

Member of the Australian Parliament for Darwin
- In office 5 May 1917 – 10 May 1917
- Preceded by: King O'Malley
- Succeeded by: William Spence

Personal details
- Born: 25 February 1867 Yorkshire, England
- Died: 10 May 1917 (aged 50) Launceston, Tasmania, Australia
- Party: Labor (1906–17); Nationalist (1917)
- Occupation: Stockbroker

Charles Richard Howroyd (25 February 1867 – 10 May 1917) was an Australian politician. He was a member of the Tasmanian House of Assembly from 1909 until 1917, representing the Australian Labor Party until leaving the party in the 1916 Labor split. He was then elected to the Australian House of Representatives at the 1917 federal election, but died only five days later.

Howroyd was born in Dewsbury in Yorkshire, England and was educated at King Edward VI Grammar School in Wakefield and Turton College in York. He initially migrated to Victoria before going into business as a stock and share broker in Hobart, Tasmania. He lived in the United States for some years before returning to Melbourne and then Launceston, where he lived from 1898 and worked as a commission agent. He was secretary of the Launceston Stock Exchange, founder of the St George's Society in Launceston, a member of the Launceston Hospital board and a justice of the peace. A trade unionist, he was also general secretary of the Railway Employees' Association in Tasmania for five years. He was the secretary of the Federal Protection League from 1900, but was one of the founding members of the Tasmanian branch of the Labor Party when it was established in 1903.

He was elected to the Tasmanian House of Assembly in 1906 for North Launceston, transferring to the new multi-member seat of Bass in 1909, and topping the poll there in his re-election in 1912. He successfully introduced or was heavily involved in the passage of legislation to introduce workers' compensation legislation in Tasmania, restrict shop opening hours, establish an eight-hour day for train drivers, protect deserted wives and establish hydroelectric works in the state. He did not achieve ministerial rank, but was secretary of the parliamentary party at the time of the 1916 split. He also served as a parliamentary member of the state executive and as president of the Launceston Workers' Political League.

On 1 November 1916, he was expelled from the Labor caucus during the 1916 Labor split as a result of his support for conscription in World War I. He formally resigned his party membership on 9 January 1917. Having been involved in forming the first National Federation branch in Tasmania, he resigned his state seat on 21 March 1917 to contest the 1917 federal election for the new Nationalist Party of Australia.

He won the seat, defeating long-serving Labor member King O'Malley, but died suddenly at his home at Inveresk five days after polling day, making him the shortest-serving member of the Australian House of Representatives in history. His health, never robust, was reported to have suffered badly during the strenuous campaign. He was buried at Carr Villa Memorial Park. The by-election held to replace him was won by fellow Labor defector William Spence, who had been defeated in an attempt to retain the New South Wales Labor seat of Darling for the Nationalists.

Parliament of Australia
Preceded by King O'Malley	Member for Darwin; 1917	Succeeded by William Spence
