= Louisiana's 4th congressional district =

U.S. House district for Louisiana

Coordinates: 31°47′31″N 93°10′47″W

- Interactive map of district boundaries
- Representative: Mike Johnson; R–Benton
- Distribution: 58.65% urban; 41.35% rural
- Population (2025): 767,394
- Median household income: $65,121
- Ethnicity: 68.4% White; 20.1% Black; 5.1% Hispanic; 3.9% Two or more races; 1.3% Asian; 0.8% Native American; 0.4% other
- Cook PVI: R+26

Louisiana's 4th congressional district is a congressional district in the U.S. state of Louisiana. The district is located in the northwestern part of the state and is based in Shreveport-Bossier City. It also includes the cities of Minden, DeRidder, and Ruston, and part of Monroe. The district is represented by Republican Mike Johnson, who has served as the Speaker of the House since October 2023.

With a Cook Partisan Voting Index rating of R+26, it is the most Republican district in Louisiana.

== History ==
The 4th congressional district was created in 1843, the first new district in the state in 20 years. It was gained after the 1840 U.S. census.

For most of the next 150 years, the 4th was centered on Shreveport and northwestern Louisiana. However, in 1993, Louisiana lost a congressional district, based on population figures. The state legislature shifted most of Shreveport's white residents into the 5th congressional district. Republican Jim McCrery ran for election in the new 5th and won, defeating Democrat Jerry Huckaby, who represented the old 5th for eight terms.

Meanwhile, the 4th was reconfigured as a 63-percent African American-majority district, stretching in a roughly "Z" shape from Shreveport to Baton Rouge. Democrat Cleo Fields was elected for two terms as the representative of the 4th congressional district. When the Supreme Court of the United States invalidated the boundaries of the new 4th congressional district as unconstitutional, the Louisiana legislature redrew the district to encompass most of Northwest Louisiana, closely resembling its pre-1993 configuration. It is white majority. McCrery was elected in 1996 to this seat.

The 2024 Allen v. Milligan decision dictated a new map to be drawn to be African American-majority; as such, the 4th district contributes parts of Shreveport, half of DeSoto Parish, and all of Natchitoches and St Landry Parishes to the redrawn 6th district, while absorbing Lincoln, Jackson, Winn, and part of Rapides Parish from the 5th. This also shifted the 4th from being the state's most competitive district with a Cook PVI of R+14 to the most solidly Republican with a PVI of R+26.

== Parishes and communities ==
For the 119th and successive Congresses (based on the districts drawn following a 2023 court order), the district contains all or portions of the following parishes and communities.

Allen Parish (5)

All five communities

Beauregard Parish (6)

All six communities

Bienville Parish (10)

All ten communities

Bossier Parish (7)

All seven communities

Calcasieu Parish (9)

Carlyss (part; also 3rd), DeQuincy, Gillis, Lake Charles (part; also 3rd), Moss Bluff (part; also 3rd), Prien (part; also 3rd), Starks, Sulphur (part; also 3rd), Vinton

Caddo Parish (11)

Belcher, Blanchard, Gilliam, Greenwood, Hosston, Ida, Mooringsport, Oil City, Rodessa, Shreveport (part; also 6th; shared with Bossier Parish), Vivian

Claiborne Parish (4)

All four communities

DeSoto Parish (7)

Gloster (part; also 6th), Grand Cane, Keachi, Logansport, Longstreet, Stanley, Stonewall

Evangeline Parish (7)

All seven communities

Grant Parish (8)

All eight communities

Jackson Parish (7)

All seven communities

Lincoln Parish (6)

All six communities

Ouachita Parish (4)

Claiborne, Monroe (part; also 5th), Sterlington, West Monroe (part; also 5th)

Rapides Parish (5)

Alexandria (part; also 6th), Forest Hill, Glenmora, McNary, Woodworth

Red River Parish (4)

All four communities

Sabine Parish (9)

All nine communities

Union Parish (8)

All eight communities

Vernon Parish (10)

All ten communities

Webster Parish (11)

All 11 communities

Winn Parish (9)

All nine communities

== Recent election results from statewide races ==
| Year | Office | Results |
|---|---|---|
| 2008 | President | McCain 71% - 27% |
| 2012 | President | Romney 73% - 27% |
| 2014 | Senate | Cassidy 72% - 28% |
| 2015 | Governor | Vitter 57% - 43% |
| 2015 | Lt. Governor | Nungesser 68% - 32% |
| 2016 | President | Trump 73% - 24% |
| 2016 | Senate | Kennedy 74% - 26% |
| 2019 | Governor | Rispone 66% - 34% |
| 2019 | Lt. Governor | Nungesser 79% - 21% |
| 2019 | Attorney General | Landry 80% - 20% |
| 2020 | President | Trump 74% - 25% |
| 2023 | Attorney General | Murrill 78% - 22% |
| 2024 | President | Trump 76% - 23% |

== List of members representing the district ==
| Name | Party | Years | Cong ress | Electoral history | Location |
|---|---|---|---|---|---|
District created March 4, 1843
| Pierre Bossier (Natchitoches) | Democratic | March 4, 1843 – April 24, 1844 | 28th | Elected in 1842. Died. | |
| Vacant | | April 24, 1844 – December 2, 1844 | 28th | | |
| Isaac Edward Morse (St. Martinville) | Democratic | December 2, 1844 – March 3, 1851 | 28th 29th 30th 31st | Elected to finish Bossier's term. Also elected to the next full term. Re-elected in 1846. Re-elected in 1848. Lost re-election. | |
| John Moore (New Iberia) | Whig | March 4, 1851 – March 3, 1853 | 32nd | Elected in 1850. Retired. | |
| Roland Jones (Shreveport) | Democratic | March 4, 1853 – March 3, 1855 | 33rd | Elected in 1852. Retired. | |
| John M. Sandidge (Pineville) | Democratic | March 4, 1855 – March 3, 1859 | 34th 35th | Elected in 1854. Re-elected in 1856. Retired. | |
| John M. Landrum (Shreveport) | Democratic | March 4, 1859 – March 3, 1861 | 36th | Elected in 1858. Vacated seat due to Civil War. | |
| Vacant | | March 4, 1861 – July 18, 1868 | 37th 38th 39th 40th | Civil War and Reconstruction | |
| Michel Vidal (Opelousas) | Republican | July 18, 1868 – March 3, 1869 | 40th | Elected to finish the vacant term. Retired to become U.S. consul to Tripoli, Libya. | |
| Vacant | | March 4, 1869 – May 23, 1870 | 41st | | |
| Joseph P. Newsham (St. Francisville) | Republican | May 23, 1870 – March 3, 1871 | 41st | Successfully contested election of Michael Ryan. Retired. | |
| James McCleery (Shreveport) | Republican | March 4, 1871 – November 5, 1871 | 42nd | Elected in 1870. Died. | |
| Vacant | | November 5, 1871 – December 3, 1872 | 42nd | | |
| Alexander Boarman (Shreveport) | Liberal Republican | December 3, 1872 – March 3, 1873 | 42nd | Elected to finish McCleery's term. Retired. | |
| Vacant | | March 4, 1873 – November 24, 1873 | 43rd | Representative-elect Samuel Peters died before the term began. | |
| George Luke Smith (Shreveport) | Republican | November 24, 1873 – March 3, 1875 | 43rd | Elected to finish Peters's term. Lost re-election. | |
| William Mallory Levy (Natchitoches) | Democratic | March 4, 1875 – March 3, 1877 | 44th | Elected in 1874. Lost renomination. | |
| Joseph Barton Elam (Mansfield) | Democratic | March 4, 1877 – March 3, 1881 | 45th 46th | Elected in 1876. Re-elected in 1878. Retired due to injuries. | |
| Newton C. Blanchard (Shreveport) | Democratic | March 4, 1881 – March 12, 1894 | 47th 48th 49th 50th 51st 52nd 53rd | Elected in 1880. Re-elected in 1882. Re-elected in 1884. Re-elected in 1886. Re-elected in 1888. Re-elected in 1890. Re-elected in 1892. Resigned when appointed U.S. senator. | |
| Vacant | | March 12, 1894 – May 12, 1894 | 53rd | | |
| Henry Warren Ogden (Benton) | Democratic | May 12, 1894 – March 3, 1899 | 53rd 54th 55th | Elected to finish Blanchard's term. Re-elected in 1894. Re-elected in 1896. Retired. | |
| Phanor Breazeale (Natchitoches) | Democratic | March 4, 1899 – March 3, 1905 | 56th 57th 58th | Elected in 1898. Re-elected in 1900. Re-elected in 1902. Lost renomination. | |
| John T. Watkins (Minden) | Democratic | March 4, 1905 – March 3, 1921 | 59th 60th 61st 62nd 63rd 64th 65th 66th | Elected in 1904. Re-elected in 1906. Re-elected in 1908. Re-elected in 1910. Re-elected in 1912. Re-elected in 1914. Re-elected in 1916. Re-elected in 1918. Lost renomination. | |
| John N. Sandlin (Minden) | Democratic | March 4, 1921 – January 3, 1937 | 67th 68th 69th 70th 71st 72nd 73rd 74th | Elected in 1920. Re-elected in 1922. Re-elected in 1924. Re-elected in 1926. Re-elected in 1928. Re-elected in 1930. Re-elected in 1932. Re-elected in 1934. Retired to run for U.S. Senator. | |
| Overton Brooks (Shreveport) | Democratic | January 3, 1937 – September 16, 1961 | 75th 76th 77th 78th 79th 80th 81st 82nd 83rd 84th 85th 86th 87th | Elected in 1936. Re-elected in 1938. Re-elected in 1940. Re-elected in 1942. Re-elected in 1944. Re-elected in 1946. Re-elected in 1948. Re-elected in 1950. Re-elected in 1952. Re-elected in 1954. Re-elected in 1956. Re-elected in 1958. Re-elected in 1960. Died. | |
| Vacant | | September 16, 1961 – December 19, 1961 | 87th | | |
| Joe Waggonner Jr. (Plain Dealing) | Democratic | December 19, 1961 – January 3, 1979 | 87th 88th 89th 90th 91st 92nd 93rd 94th 95th | Elected to finish Brooks's term. Re-elected in 1962. Re-elected in 1964. Re-elected in 1966. Re-elected in 1968. Re-elected in 1970. Re-elected in 1972. Re-elected in 1974. Re-elected in 1976. Retired. | |
| Buddy Leach (Leesville) | Democratic | January 3, 1979 – January 3, 1981 | 96th | Elected in 1978. Lost re-election. | |
| Buddy Roemer (Bossier City) | Democratic | January 3, 1981 – March 14, 1988 | 97th 98th 99th 100th | Elected in 1980. Re-elected in 1982. Re-elected in 1984. Re-elected in 1986. Resigned when elected governor. | |
| Vacant | | March 14, 1988 – April 16, 1988 | 100th | | |
| Jim McCrery (Shreveport) | Republican | April 16, 1988 – January 3, 1993 | 100th 101st 102nd | Elected to finish Roemer's term. Re-elected in 1988. Re-elected in 1990. Redistricted to the 5th district. | |
| Cleo Fields (Baton Rouge) | Democratic | January 3, 1993 – January 3, 1997 | 103rd 104th | Elected in 1992. Re-elected in 1994. Redistricted to the 5th district and retired. | |
| Jim McCrery (Shreveport) | Republican | January 3, 1997 – January 3, 2009 | 105th 106th 107th 108th 109th 110th | Redistricted from the 5th district and re-elected in 1996. Re-elected in 1998. Re-elected in 2000. Re-elected in 2002. Re-elected in 2004. Re-elected in 2006. Retired. | 1997–2003 [data missing] |
| Jim McCrery (Shreveport) | Republican | January 3, 1997 – January 3, 2009 | 105th 106th 107th 108th 109th 110th | Redistricted from the 5th district and re-elected in 1996. Re-elected in 1998. Re-elected in 2000. Re-elected in 2002. Re-elected in 2004. Re-elected in 2006. Retired. | 2003–2013 |
| John C. Fleming (Minden) | Republican | January 3, 2009 – January 3, 2017 | 111th 112th 113th 114th | Elected in 2008. Re-elected in 2010. Re-elected in 2012. Re-elected in 2014. Retired to run for U.S. Senator. | 2003–2013 |
| John C. Fleming (Minden) | Republican | January 3, 2009 – January 3, 2017 | 111th 112th 113th 114th | Elected in 2008. Re-elected in 2010. Re-elected in 2012. Re-elected in 2014. Retired to run for U.S. Senator. | 2013–2023 |
| Mike Johnson (Benton) | Republican | January 3, 2017 – present | 115th 116th 117th 118th 119th | Elected in 2016. Re-elected in 2018. Re-elected in 2020. Re-elected in 2022. Re-elected in 2024. Re-elected in 2026. | 2013–2023 |
| Mike Johnson (Benton) | Republican | January 3, 2017 – present | 115th 116th 117th 118th 119th | Elected in 2016. Re-elected in 2018. Re-elected in 2020. Re-elected in 2022. Re-elected in 2024. Re-elected in 2026. | 2023–2025 |
| Mike Johnson (Benton) | Republican | January 3, 2017 – present | 115th 116th 117th 118th 119th | Elected in 2016. Re-elected in 2018. Re-elected in 2020. Re-elected in 2022. Re-elected in 2024. Re-elected in 2026. | 2025–present |

== Recent election results ==
=== 2002 ===
Louisiana's 4th Congressional District Election (2002)
| Party | Candidate | Votes | % |
|---|---|---|---|
| Republican | Jim McCrery* | 114,649 | 71.61 |
| Democratic | John Milkovich | 42,340 | 26.45 |
| Libertarian | Bill Jacobs | 3,104 | 1.94 |
| Total votes | | 160,093 | 100.00 |
| Turnout | | | |
| Republican hold | | | |

=== 2004 ===
Louisiana's 4th Congressional District Election (2004)
| Party | Candidate | Votes | % |
|---|---|---|---|
| Republican | Jim McCrery* | | 100.00 |
| Total votes | | | 100.00 |
| Turnout | | | |
| Republican hold | | | |

=== 2006 ===
Louisiana's 4th Congressional District Election (2006)
| Party | Candidate | Votes | % |
|---|---|---|---|
| Republican | Jim McCrery* | 77,078 | 57.40 |
| Democratic | Artis R. Cash, Sr. | 22,757 | 16.95 |
| Democratic | Patti Cox | 17,788 | 13.25 |
| Republican | Chester T. "Catfish" Kelley | 16,649 | 12.40 |
| Total votes | | 134,272 | 100.00 |
| Turnout | | | |
| Republican hold | | | |

=== 2008 ===
Louisiana's 4th Congressional District Election (December 6, 2008)
| Party | Candidate | Votes | % |
|---|---|---|---|
| Republican | John C. Fleming | 44,501 | 48.07 |
| Democratic | Paul Carmouche | 44,151 | 47.69 |
| Independent | Chester T. "Catfish" Kelley | 3,245 | 3.51 |
| Independent | Gerard J. Bowen | 675 | 0.73 |
| Total votes | | 92,572 | 100.00 |
| Turnout | | | |
| Republican hold | | | |

=== 2010 ===
Louisiana's 4th Congressional District Election (2010)
| Party | Candidate | Votes | % |
|---|---|---|---|
| Republican | John C. Fleming* | 105,223 | 62.34 |
| Democratic | David Melville | 54,609 | 32.35 |
| Independent | Artis R. Cash, Sr. | 8,962 | 5.31 |
| Total votes | | 168,794 | 100.00 |
| Turnout | | | |
| Republican hold | | | |

=== 2012 ===
Louisiana's 4th Congressional District Election (2012)
| Party | Candidate | Votes | % |
|---|---|---|---|
| Republican | John C. Fleming* | 187,894 | 75 |
| Libertarian | Randall Lord | 61,637 | 25 |
| Total votes | | 249,531 | 100.00 |
| Turnout | | | 67.8 |
| Republican hold | | | |

=== 2014 ===
Louisiana's 4th Congressional District Election (2014)
| Party | Candidate | Votes | % |
|---|---|---|---|
| Republican | John C. Fleming* | 152,683 | 73 |
| Libertarian | Randall Lord | 55,236 | 27 |
| Total votes | | 207,919 | 100.00 |
| Turnout | | | 51 |
| Republican hold | | | |

=== 2016 ===
Louisiana's 4th Congressional District Election (2016)
| Party | Candidate | Votes | % |
|---|---|---|---|
| Democratic | Marshall Jones | 80,593 | 28 |
| Republican | Mike Johnson | 70,580 | 25 |
| Republican | Ralph "Trey" Baucum | 50,412 | 18 |
| Republican | Oliver Jenkins | 44,521 | 16 |
| Republican | Elbert Guillory | 21,017 | 7 |
| Republican | "Rick" John | 13,220 | 5 |
| No Party | Mark David Halverson | 3,149 | 1 |
| No Party | Kenneth J. Krefft | 2,493 | 1 |
| Total votes | | 285,985 | 100.00 |
| Turnout | | | 66.6 |

Louisiana's 4th Congressional District Election (2016 Runoff)
| Party | Candidate | Votes | % |
|---|---|---|---|
| Republican | Mike Johnson | 87,370 | 65 |
| Democratic | Marshall Jones | 46,579 | 35 |
| Total votes | | 138,433 | 100.00 |
| Turnout | | | 28.1 |
| Republican hold | | | |

=== 2018 ===
Louisiana's 4th congressional district, 2018
| Party | Candidate | Votes | % |
|---|---|---|---|
| Republican | Mike Johnson* | 139,326 | 64.2 |
| Democratic | Ryan Trundle | 72,934 | 33.6 |
| Independent | Mark David Halverson | 4,612 | 2.1 |
| Total votes | | 216,872 | 100.0 |
| Republican hold | | | |

=== 2020 ===
Louisiana's 4th congressional district, 2020
| Party | Candidate | Votes | % |
|---|---|---|---|
| Republican | Mike Johnson* | 185,265 | 60.43 |
| Democratic | Kenny Houston | 78,157 | 25.49 |
| Democratic | Ryan Trundle | 23,813 | 7.77 |
| Republican | Ben Gibson | 19,343 | 6.31 |
| Total votes | | 306,578 | 100.0 |
| Republican hold | | | |

=== 2022 ===
Louisiana's 4th congressional district, 2022
| Party | Candidate | Votes | % |
|---|---|---|---|
| Republican | Mike Johnson* | Unopposed | |
| Republican hold | | | |

=== 2024 ===
Louisiana's 4th congressional district, 2024
| Party | Candidate | Votes | % |
|---|---|---|---|
| Republican | Mike Johnson* | 262,821 | 85.8 |
| Republican | Joshua Morott | 43,427 | 14.2 |
| Total votes | | 306,248 | 100.0 |
| Republican hold | | | |

== See also ==
- Louisiana's congressional districts
- List of United States congressional districts

U.S. House of Representatives
| Preceded by California's 20th congressional district | Home district of the speaker of the House; October 25, 2023 — present | Incumbent |
