= List of shortest-serving members of the Parliament of Australia =

This is a list of the shortest-serving members of the Parliament of Australia.

The shortest-serving member of the House of Representatives (and overall in the parliament) is Charles Howroyd, who died five days after the 1917 election, with his health having suffered badly during the strenuous campaign. The shortest-serving senator is Lionel Courtenay, who died ten days after the beginning of his term without having been officially sworn in.

== List ==
This list does not include incumbent members currently serving their first term.

Member	Party	Electorate	Term start	Term end	Service (in days)	Notes
Charles Howroyd	Nationalist	Darwin	5 May 1917	10 May 1917	5	Died
Lionel Courtenay	United Australia	New South Wales (Senate)	1 July 1935	11 July 1935	10	Died
John Clasby	United Australia	East Sydney	19 December 1931	15 January 1932	27	Died
Warwick Stacey	One Nation	New South Wales (Senate)	1 July 2025	19 August 2025	49	Resigned
Charles Mackellar	Protectionist	New South Wales (Senate)	8 October 1903	30 November 1903	53	Retired
Jack Power	Labor	New South Wales (Senate)	20 November 1924	13 January 1925	54	Died
Max Poulter	Labor	Queensland (Senate)	1 July 1962	2 September 1962	63	Died
Albert Field	Independent	Queensland (Senate)	3 September 1975	11 November 1975	69	Retired
David Reid	Country	Western Australia (Senate)	16 January 1974	11 April 1974	85	Lost seat
Duncan Spender	Liberal Democrats	New South Wales (Senate)	20 March 2019	30 June 2019	102	Lost seat
Edward Jolley	Labor	Grampians	5 September 1914	1 January 1915	118	Died
Robert Blackwood	Free Trade	Riverina	16 December 1903	13 April 1904	119	Election declared void
William Henry Groom	Protectionist	Darling Downs	30 March 1901	8 August 1901	131	Died
Alexander Fraser	Country	Victoria (Senate)	15 May 1946	27 September 1946	135	Lost seat
Martin Cameron	Liberal	South Australia (Senate)	23 May 1969	24 October 1969	154	Lost seat
Edwin Kerby	Nationalist	Ballaarat	13 December 1919	2 June 1920	182	Election declared void
Richard Abbott	Country	Victoria (Senate)	18 December 1928	30 June 1929	190	Retired
Patrick Mooney	Lang Labor	New South Wales (Senate)	23 December 1931	30 June 1932	190	Lost seat
Rod Culleton	One Nation/Independent	Western Australia (Senate)	2 July 2016	11 January 2017	193	Disqualified
Kerryn Phelps	Independent	Wentworth	20 October 2018	18 May 2019	210	Lost seat
Greg Mirabella	Liberal	Victoria (Senate)	2 December 2021	30 June 2022	210	Lost seat
Albert Robinson	Nationalist	South Australia (Senate)	18 April 1928	16 November 1928	212	Lost seat
Bill Robinson	Country	Western Australia (Senate)	30 September 1952	8 May 1953	220	Lost seat
Henry Saunders	Free Trade	Western Australia (Senate)	20 May 1903	31 December 1903	225	Lost seat
William Gibbs	Labor	New South Wales (Senate)	1 April 1925	13 November 1925	226	Disendorsed
Leonie Short	Labor	Ryan	17 March 2001	10 November 2001	238	Lost seat
Henry Beard	Labor	Batman	13 April 1910	18 December 1910	249	Died
Cleaver Bunton	Independent	New South Wales (Senate)	27 February 1975	11 November 1975	257	Retired
Harry Kneebone	Labor	South Australia (Senate)	1 April 1931	18 December 1931	261	Lost seat
Robert Simms	Greens	South Australia (Senate)	22 September 2015	2 July 2016	284	Lost seat
Mehmet Tillem	Labor	Victoria (Senate)	21 August 2013	30 June 2014	313	Lost seat
Charles Latham	Country	Western Australia (Senate)	8 October 1942	20 August 1943	316	Lost seat
Benjamin Bennett	Labor	Werriwa	1 June 1912	23 April 1913	326	Retired
Frederick Piesse	Free Trade	Tasmania	29 March 1901	6 March 1902	342	Died
Brendan Smyth	Liberal	Canberra	25 March 1995	2 March 1996	343	Defeated in other seat
Robert Reid	Free Trade	Victoria (Senate)	21 January 1903	31 December 1903	344	Retired

== See also ==
- List of longest-serving members of the Parliament of Australia
- List of members of the United States Congress by brevity of service
