= James McCleery =

American politician

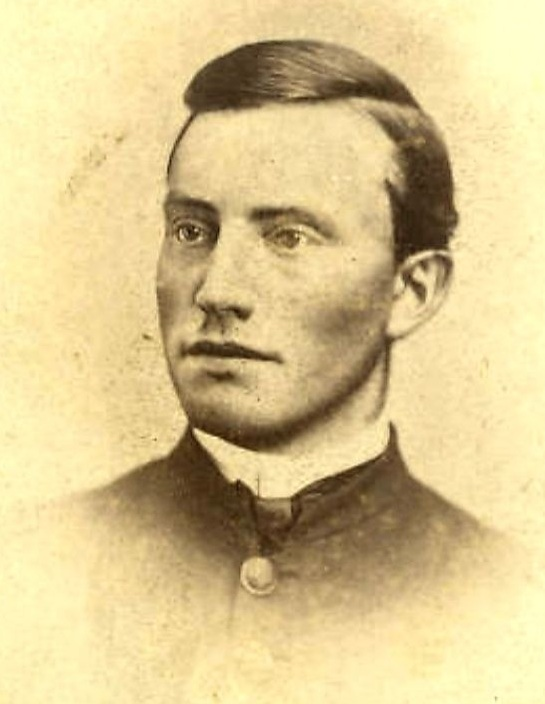

Member of the U.S. House of Representatives from Louisiana's 4th district
- In office March 4, 1871 – November 5, 1871
- Preceded by: Joseph P. Newsham
- Succeeded by: Alexander Boarman

Personal details
- Born: December 2, 1837 Mecca, Ohio, US
- Died: November 5, 1871 (aged 33) New York City, New York, US
- Resting place: Christian Church Cemetery, Cortland, Ohio, US
- Party: Republican

Military service
- Allegiance: United States of America; Union
- Branch/service: Union Army; United States Army
- Years of service: 1861–1870
- Rank: Major; Bvt. Brigadier General
- Unit: 41st Ohio Infantry Regiment; 45th U.S. Infantry Regiment
- Battles/wars: American Civil War: Battle of Shiloh

James McCleery (December 2, 1837 – November 5, 1871) was an Ohio-born lawyer and officer in the Union Army during the American Civil War. He also served as U.S. representative from Louisiana.

== Biography ==
Born in Mecca Township, Trumbull County, Ohio, McCleery attended Oberlin College in 1859 and 1860.

He served in the Union Army during the American Civil War. He received a commission as second lieutenant of Company A, 41st Ohio Volunteer Infantry, in 1861, and was wounded in the Battle of Shiloh in 1862, as a result losing his right arm. He was promoted through the ranks to major in 1865. He entered the Regular Army as captain in the 45th U.S. Infantry in 1866 and subsequently received the brevets of major (in the regulars) and brigadier general of Volunteers. He retired on December 15, 1870, having settled in St. Mary Parish, Louisiana, where he purchased a plantation and went into the practice of law. He was connected with the Freedmen's Bureau not only in Louisiana but also in North Carolina. He soon moved to Shreveport, Louisiana, where he was appointed superintendent of public education for the fourth division.

McCleery was elected as a Republican from Louisiana's 4th congressional district to the Forty-second Congress and served from March 4, 1871, until his death while on a visit in New York City on November 5, 1871.

He was interred in the Christian Church Cemetery in Cortland, Ohio. McCleery's tombstone in the Cortland Christian Church cemetery reads as follows:

JAMES MCCLEERY
BREVET
BRIG GEN
41 OHIO INF
Born December 2, 1837
Died November 5, 1871

== See also ==
- List of members of the United States Congress who died in office (1790–1899)

U.S. House of Representatives
Preceded by Joseph P. Newsham	Member of the U.S. House of Representatives from Louisiana's 4th congressional district 1871	Succeeded by Alexander Boarman
