= George A. Sheridan =

American politician (1840–1896)

George Augustus Sheridan
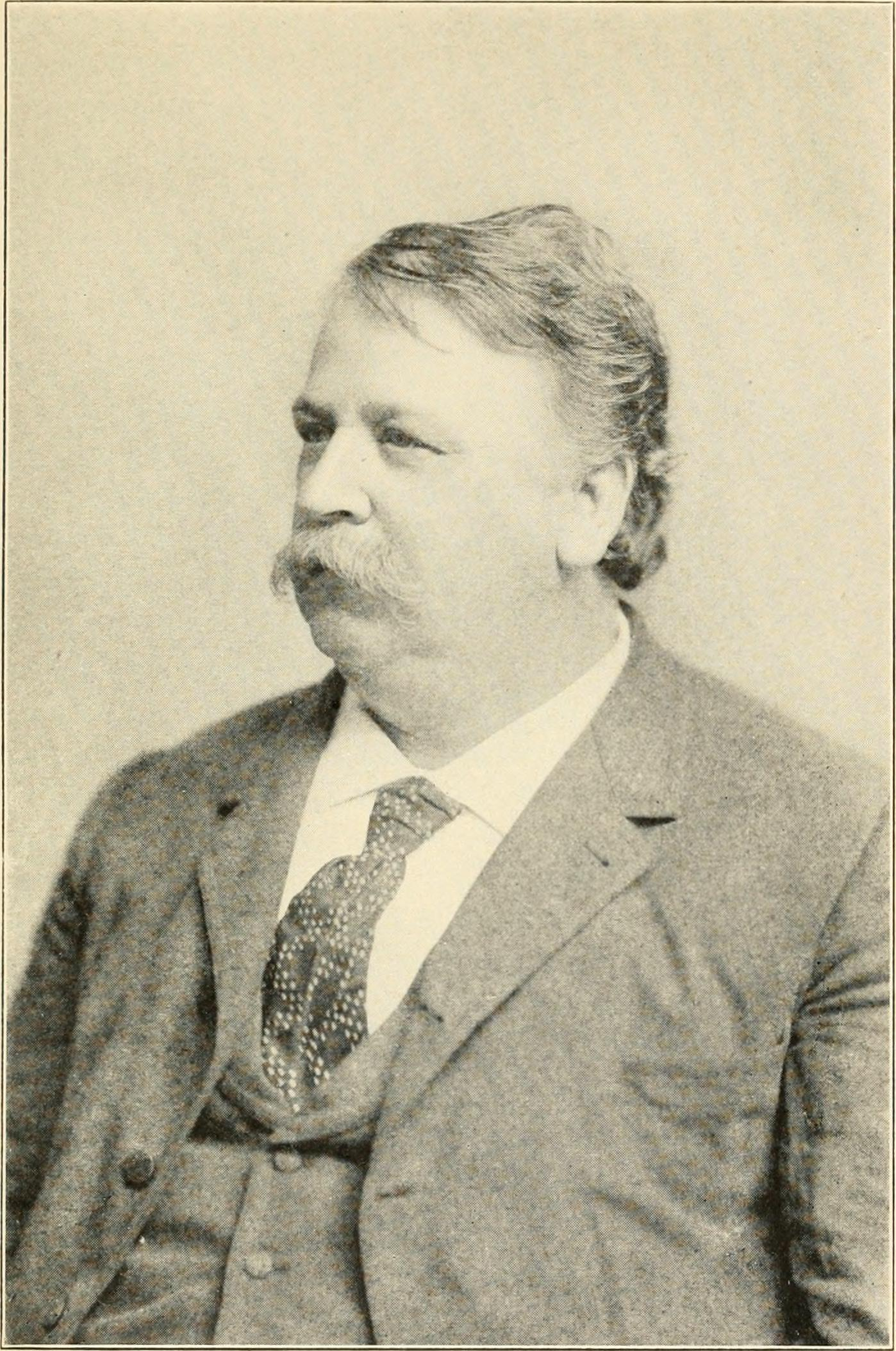

Member of the U.S. House of Representatives from Louisiana's at-large district
- In office March 3, 1875 – March 4, 1875
- Preceded by: District created
- Succeeded by: District eliminated

Personal details
- Born: February 22, 1840 Millbury, Massachusetts, U.S.
- Died: October 7, 1896 (aged 56) Hampton, Virginia, U.S.
- Resting place: Arlington National Cemetery
- Party: Liberal Republican
- Children: Emma Viola Sheridan

George Augustus Sheridan (February 22, 1840 – October 7, 1896) was an American Civil War veteran and politician who, along with Effingham Lawrence and Rebecca Latimer Felton is known for serving for the shortest term in congressional history, serving for just one day in the U.S. House of Representatives.

== Biography ==
Sheridan was born in Millbury, Massachusetts, and moved with his parents to Chicago in 1858.

=== Civil War ===
During the Civil War, he served as a captain in the Union Army until his resignation on October 28, 1864.

After the war, Sheridan was one of a group of Northern officials who moved in to administer the defeated Southern states (often derisively referred to by Southerners as "carpetbaggers"). In 1866, he moved to New Orleans, Louisiana; where he served as brigadier general of the militia on the staff of the Republican Governor, Henry Clay Warmoth. In 1867, Sheridan was made sheriff of Carroll Parish in northeastern Louisiana, which was later divided into East Carroll and West Carroll parishes.

=== Congress ===
Sheridan ran for the House in 1872 as a Liberal Republican against then Lt. Gov. P. B. S. Pinchback. After the election, Pinchback would become the first black governor of a U.S. state following the impeachment of the prior governor Henry C. Warmoth. Pinchback originally had credentials to be seated and the House was inclined to do so, but did not wish to be as he had also won a seat in the Senate (that he was never allowed to take). Sheridan contested the election and the matter wasn't fully settled until March 3, 1875, the last day of Congress. He was sworn in in the morning, serving until noon the next day.

=== After Congress ===
After his service in the House, he was appointed Recorder of Deeds in the District of Columbia by President Rutherford Hayes, serving from May 17, 1878, until May 17, 1881, when President James Garfield fired him in order to provide the job to Frederick Douglass.

=== Family ===
His daughter was the actress, Emma Sheridan.

=== Death ===
Sheridan died at the age of fifty-six in the National Home for Disabled Volunteer Soldiers in Hampton, Virginia. He was interred at Arlington National Cemetery.

== See also ==
- List of members of the United States Congress by brevity of service

U.S. House of Representatives
Preceded by District created	Member of the U.S. House of Representatives from Louisiana's at-large congressional district 1875	Succeeded by District eliminated
