= George Luke Smith =

American politician

George L. Smith

Member of the U.S. House of Representatives from Louisiana's 4th district
- In office November 24, 1873 – March 3, 1875
- Preceded by: Alexander Boarman
- Succeeded by: William M. Levy

Louisiana State Representative for Caddo Parish
- In office 1870–1872

Personal details
- Born: George Luke Smith; December 11, 1837 New Boston, New Hampshire
- Died: July 9, 1884 (aged 46) Hot Springs, Arkansas
- Resting place: West Street Cemetery, Milford, New Hampshire
- Party: Republican
- Education: Union College

Military service
- Branch/service: Union Army

George Luke Smith (December 11, 1837 – July 9, 1884) was an American businessman who served one-term as a U.S. representative for Louisiana's 4th congressional district from 1873 to 1875. The district at the time was anchored by the state's third largest city, Shreveport. Before moving to Louisiana, he had previously served in the Union Army during the Civil War.

== Early life and education ==
Born in New Boston in Hillsborough County in southern New Hampshire, Smith completed preparatory studies and attended Union College in Schenectady, New York.

== Civil War ==
During the Civil War, he served in the Union Army.

At the close of the war, he relocated to Shreveport to engage in mercantile pursuits.

== Early career ==
He served from 1870 to 1872 as a member of the Louisiana House of Representatives during Reconstruction.

=== Business ===
He was the proprietor of Shreveport Southwestern Telegram and president of the Shreveport Savings Bank & Trust Company.

=== Congress ===
Smith was elected as a Republican to the Forty-third Congress to fill the vacancy created by the death of Representative-elect Samuel Peters and served from November 24, 1873, until March 3, 1875.

Considered by some to be a Carpetbagger due to his northern roots and service in the Union Army, Smith was an unsuccessful candidate for reelection in 1874 to the Forty-fourth Congress. He was succeeded by the Democrat William M. Levy.

== Later career ==
Thereafter, Smith was appointed collector of customs at the port of New Orleans by U.S. President Rutherford B. Hayes, a position that he held from May 4, 1878, to February 20, 1879. He moved to Hot Springs, Hot Springs, Arkansas, to engage in the real estate business until his death there.

He died in 1884 and is interred at the West Street Cemetery in Milford, New Hampshire.

== Legacy ==
Smith was the last Republican to hold the 4th district House seat in Louisiana until 1988, when Jim McCrery won a special election for the position to succeed Buddy Roemer who was elected governor of Louisiana the preceding year.

U.S. House of Representatives
Preceded by Alexander Boarman	Member of the U.S. House of Representatives from Louisiana's 4th congressional district 1873 – 1875	Succeeded by William M. Levy
