= Alexander Boarman =

American judge

Alexander "Aleck" Boarman
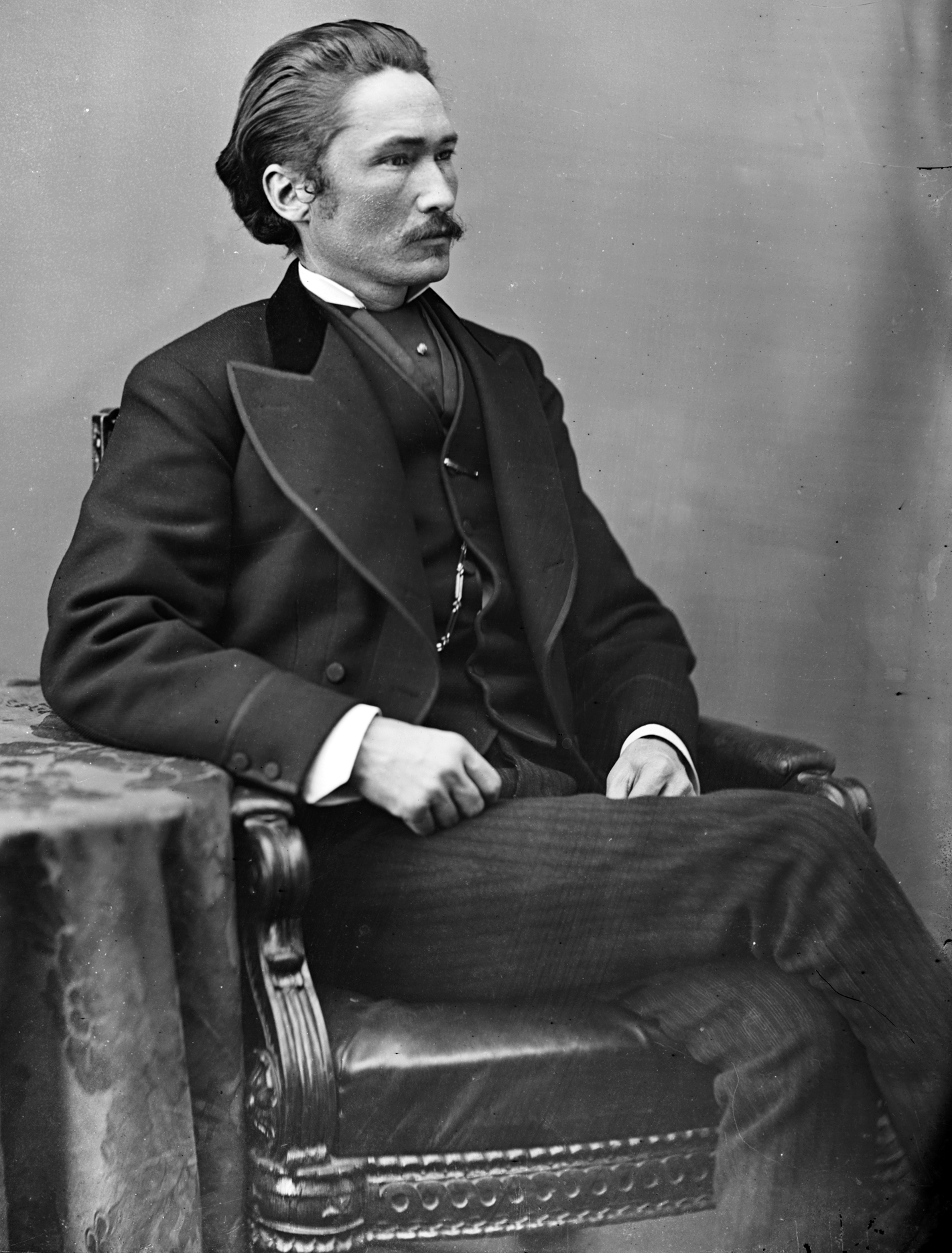

Judge of the United States District Court for the Western District of Louisiana
- In office May 18, 1881 – August 30, 1916
- Appointed by: James A. Garfield
- Preceded by: Seat established by 21 Stat. 507
- Succeeded by: George W. Jack

Member of the U.S. House of Representatives from Louisiana's 4th district
- In office December 3, 1872 – March 3, 1873
- Preceded by: James McCleery
- Succeeded by: George Luke Smith

Mayor of Shreveport, Louisiana
- In office 1866–1867
- Preceded by: Samuel Wells
- Succeeded by: Lewis S. Markham

Personal details
- Born: Alexander Boarman; December 10, 1839 Yazoo City, Mississippi
- Died: August 30, 1916 (aged 76) Loon Lake, New York
- Resting place: Oakland Cemetery; Shreveport, Louisiana
- Party: Liberal Republican
- Education: Transylvania University read law
- Nickname: Aleck

Military service
- Allegiance: Confederate States of America
- Branch/service: Confederate States Army
- Years of service: 1861–1865
- Rank: Captain
- Unit: 1st Louisiana Infantry; Army of Northern Virginia
- Battles/wars: American Civil War

Alexander "Aleck" Boarman (December 10, 1839 – August 30, 1916) was a United States representative from Louisiana and a United States district judge of the United States District Court for the Western District of Louisiana. Previously, he served in the Confederate States Army and as mayor of Shreveport, Louisiana.

== Education and career ==
Born on December 10, 1839, in Yazoo City, Yazoo County, Mississippi, Boarman lost his parents in infancy and was raised by relatives in Shreveport, Caddo Parish, Louisiana. He attended the common schools of Shreveport and Kentucky Military Institute in Franklin, Kentucky, graduated from Kentucky University (now Transylvania University) in 1860 and read law in 1860. At the outbreak of the American Civil War, he enlisted in the Confederate States Army and served as lieutenant of the Caddo Rifles. He was subsequently promoted to the rank of captain and served throughout the war. He entered private practice in Shreveport from 1866 to 1868. He was the Mayor of Shreveport from May 7, 1866 to August 8, 1867. He was city attorney for Shreveport from 1868 to 1872. He was an unsuccessful candidate for election as Secretary of State of Louisiana in 1872.

=== Civil War service ===
Boarman's regiment, the 1st Louisiana Infantry, became part of the Army of Northern Virginia. After one year of fighting, Boarman was promoted to the rank of captain in the Confederate States Army, which he held until 1865. He served as the acting assistant Adjutant-General in the Battle of Winchester. His commanding office wrote of the engagement:

I would call particular attention to Capt. Alexander Boarman, acting assistant adjutant-general, and Lieut. Joseph Taylor, acting aide-de-camp, who behaved with much courage, gallantry, and efficiency, and greatly assisted me in the engagement.

== Congressional service ==
Boarman was elected as a Liberal Republican from Louisiana's 4th congressional district to the United States House of Representatives of the 42nd United States Congress to fill the vacancy caused by the death of United States Representative-elect James McCleery and served from December 3, 1872, to March 3, 1873.

== Later career ==
Following his departure from Congress, Boarman resumed private practice in Shreveport from 1873 to 1877. He was a Judge of the Louisiana District Court for the Tenth Judicial District from 1877 to 1881.

== Federal judicial service ==
Boarman was nominated by President James A. Garfield on May 18, 1881, to the United States District Court for the Western District of Louisiana, to a new seat authorized by 21 Stat. 507. He was confirmed by the United States Senate on May 18, 1881, and received his commission the same day.

== Death and burial ==
His service terminated on August 30, 1916, due to his death while on a visit in Loon Lake, Franklin County, New York. He was interred in Oakland Cemetery in Shreveport.

== See also ==
- List of United States federal judges by longevity of service

== Sources ==
- Louisiana State Bar Association, Mississippi State Bar Association, Bar Association of Arkansas, Texas Bar Association; "Report of the Louisiana State Bar Association, Volume 18", The Association, (1918)
- Thompson, E.; "Law Notes, Volume 20", E. Thompson Co., (1917)
- Judicial Conference of the United States. Bicentennial Committee; "Judges of the United States", The Conference, for sale by the U.S. G.P.O, (1983)

U.S. House of Representatives
Preceded by James McCleery	Member of the United States House of Representatives from Louisiana's 4th congressional district 1872–1873	Succeeded by George Luke Smith
Legal offices
Preceded by Seat established by 21 Stat. 507	Judge of the United States District Court for the Western District of Louisiana; 1881–1916	Succeeded by George W. Jack
