= 43rd United States Congress =

1873-1875 U.S. Congress

←	42nd	44th	→
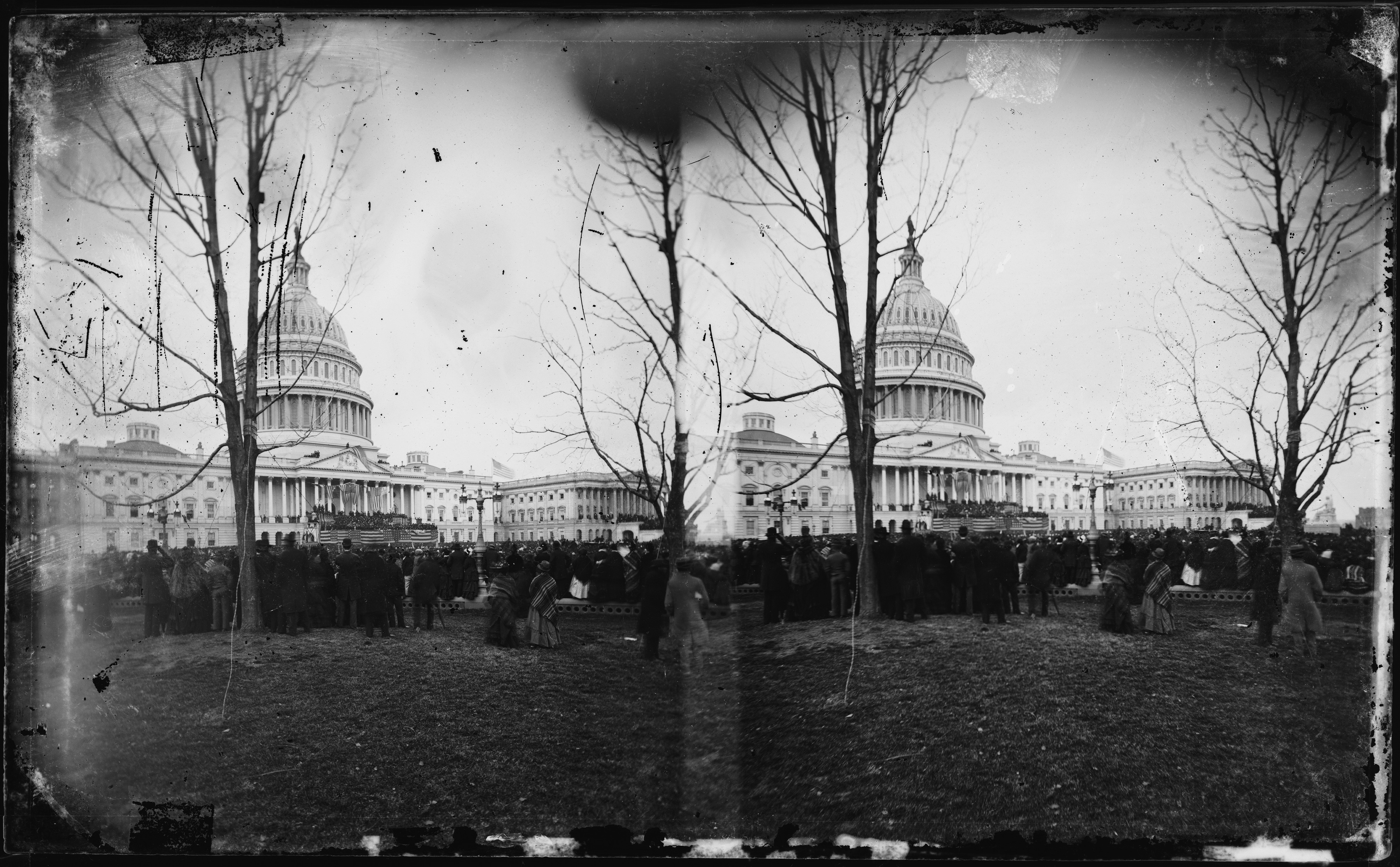
- United States Capitol (1877)

Overview
- Legislative body: United States Congress
- Jurisdiction: United States
- Term: March 4, 1873 – March 4, 1875

Senate
- Members: 74
- President: Henry Wilson (R)
- President pro tempore: Matthew H. Carpenter (R); Henry B. Anthony (R)
- Party control: Republican

House of Representatives
- Members: 292 representatives 10 non-voting delegates
- Speaker: James G. Blaine (R)
- Party control: Republican

Sessions
- Special (Note: Special session of the Senate.): March 4, 1873 – March 26, 1873
- 1st: December 1, 1873 – June 23, 1874
- 2nd: December 7, 1874 – March 4, 1875

The 43rd United States Congress was a meeting of the legislative branch of the United States federal government, consisting of the United States Senate and the United States House of Representatives. It met in Washington, D.C. from March 4, 1873, to March 4, 1875, during the fifth and sixth years of Ulysses S. Grant's presidency.

The apportionment of seats in the House of Representatives was based on the 1870 United States census.

Both chambers had a Republican majority. This is the last time Republicans held a 2/3 majority in the Senate.

== Major events ==
- September 18, 1873: New York stock market crash triggered the Panic of 1873, part of the Long Depression
- November 4, 1874: United States House of Representatives elections, 1874 -Democrats regained control of the U.S. House of Representatives for the first time since 1860
- November 25, 1874: United States Greenback Party established as a political party, made primarily of farmers financially hurt by the Panic of 1873

== Major legislation ==
- June 22, 1874: Revised Statutes of the United States
- June 23, 1874: Poland Act, 18 Stat. 253
- January 14, 1875: Specie Payment Resumption Act ch. 15, 18 Stat. 296
- March 1, 1875: Civil Rights Act of 1875, (Butler-Sumner Act) 18 Stat. 335
- March 3, 1875: Tariff of 1875 18 Stat. 469
- March 3, 1875: Page Act of 1875, 18 Stat. 477

== Treaties ==
- March 18, 1874: Hawaii signed a treaty with the United States granting exclusive trading rights.

== Party summary ==
The count below identifies party affiliations at the beginning of the first session of this Congress, and includes members from vacancies and newly admitted states, when they were first seated. Changes resulting from subsequent replacements are shown below in the "Changes in membership" section.

=== Senate ===
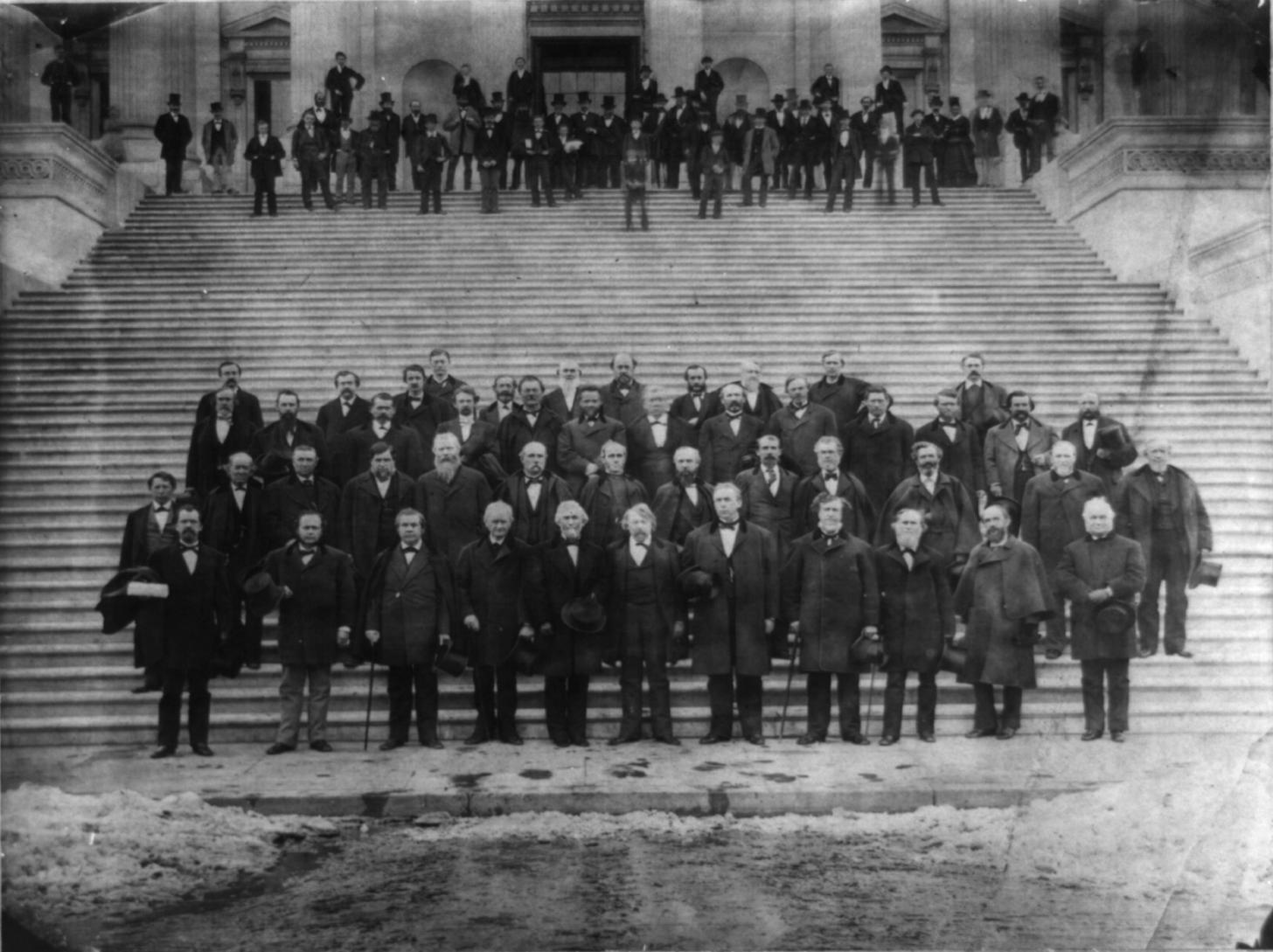
Senators of the 43rd United States Congress

	Party (shading shows control)				Total	Vacant
	Democratic (D)	Anti- Monopoly (AM)	Liberal Republican (LR)	Republican (R)	Total	Vacant
End of previous congress	17	0	1	54	72	2
Begin	19	0	3	50	72	2
End	20	0	2	51	73	1
Final voting share	27.4%	0.0%	2.7%	69.9%		
Beginning of next congress	28	1	0	43	72	2

=== House of Representatives ===
Before this Congress, the 1870 United States census and resulting reapportionment changed the size of the House to 292 members.

	Party (shading shows control)						Total	Vacant
	Democratic (D)	Independent Democratic (ID)	Independent (I)	Independent Republican (IR)	Liberal Republican (LR)	Republican (R)	Total	Vacant
End of previous congress	97	0	0	1	4	140	242	1
Begin	87	1	0	0	4	198	290	2
End	91	1	0	1	4	193	290	2
Final voting share	31.4%	0.3%	0.0%	0.3%	1.4%	66.6%		
Beginning of next congress	177	1	4	3	0	101	286	5

== Leadership ==
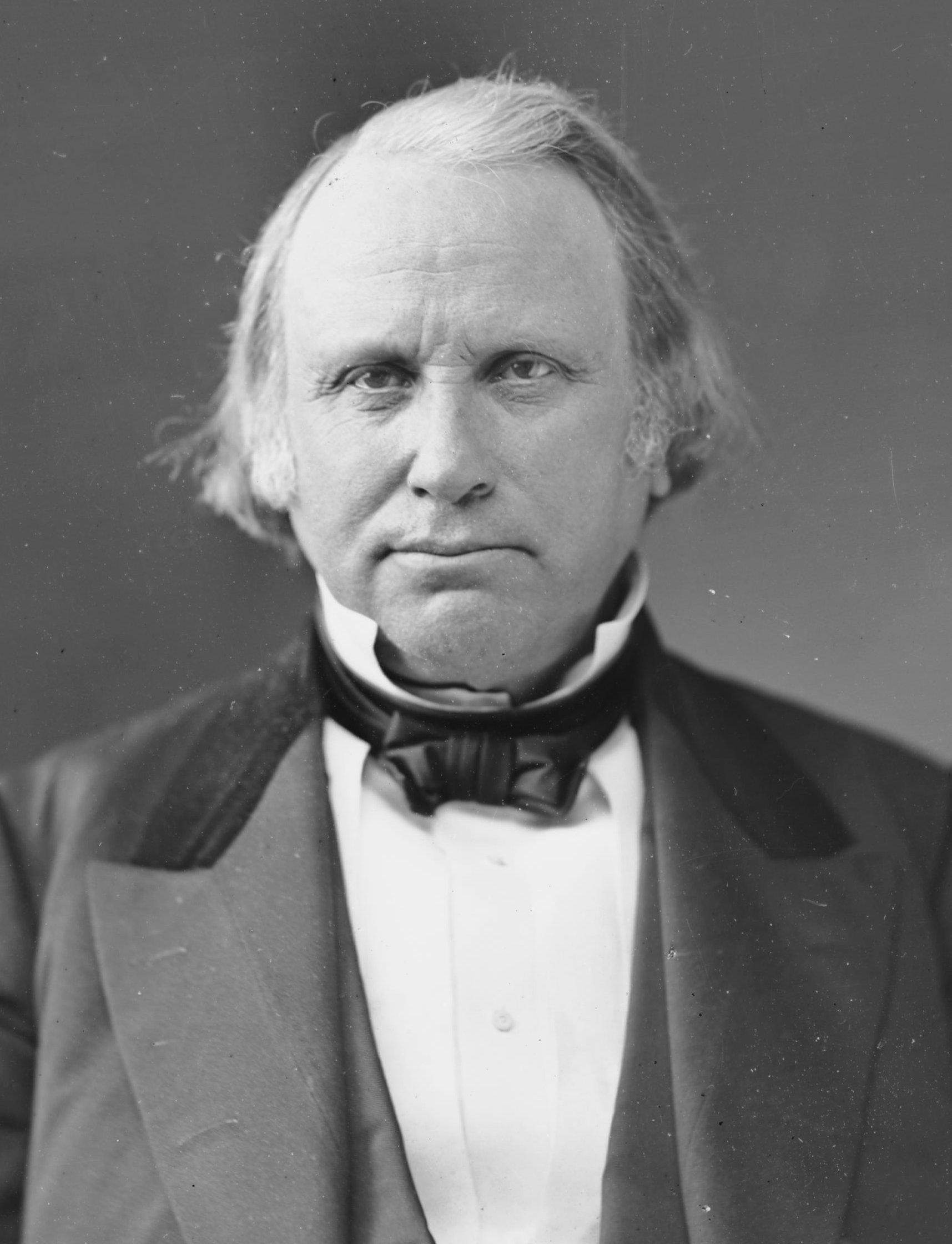
President of the Senate Henry Wilson

=== Senate ===
- President: Henry Wilson (R)
- President pro tempore: Matthew H. Carpenter (R)
  - Henry B. Anthony (R), elected January 25, 1875.

=== House of Representatives ===
- Speaker: James G. Blaine (R)
- Republican Conference Chairman: Horace Maynard
- Democratic Caucus Chairman: William E. Niblack

== Members ==
This list is arranged by chamber, then by state. Senators are listed by class and Members of the House by district.

Skip to House of Representatives, below

=== Senate ===
Senators were elected by the state legislatures every two years, with one-third beginning new six-year terms with each Congress. Preceding the names in the list below are Senate class numbers, which indicate the cycle of their election. In this Congress, class 1 meant their term ended with this Congress, facing re-election in 1874; class 2 meant their term began in the last Congress, facing re-election in 1876; and class 3 meant their term began in this Congress, facing re-election in 1878.

==== Alabama ====
▌2. George Goldthwaite (D)
▌3. George E. Spencer (R)

==== Arkansas ====
▌2. Powell Clayton (R)
▌3. Stephen W. Dorsey (R)

==== California ====
▌1. Eugene Casserly (D), until November 29, 1873

▌John S. Hager (D), from December 23, 1873

▌3. Aaron A. Sargent (R)

==== Connecticut ====
▌1. William A. Buckingham (R), until February 5, 1875

▌William W. Eaton (D), from February 5, 1875

▌3. Orris S. Ferry (LR)

==== Delaware ====
▌1. Thomas F. Bayard (D)
▌2. Eli Saulsbury (D)

==== Florida ====
▌1. Abijah Gilbert (R)
▌3. Simon B. Conover (R)

==== Georgia ====
▌2. Thomas M. Norwood (D)
▌3. John B. Gordon (D)

==== Illinois ====
▌2. John A. Logan (R)
▌3. Richard J. Oglesby (R)

==== Indiana ====
▌1. Daniel D. Pratt (R)
▌3. Oliver P. Morton (R)

==== Iowa ====
▌2. George G. Wright (R)
▌3. William B. Allison (R)

==== Kansas ====
▌2. Alexander Caldwell (R), until March 24, 1873

▌Robert Crozier (R), November 24, 1873 - February 12, 1874
▌James M. Harvey (R), from February 12, 1874

▌3. John J. Ingalls (R)

==== Kentucky ====
▌2. John W. Stevenson (D)
▌3. Thomas C. McCreery (D)

==== Louisiana ====
▌2. J. R. West (R)
3: vacant

==== Maine ====
▌1. Hannibal Hamlin (R)
▌2. Lot M. Morrill (R)

==== Maryland ====
▌1. William T. Hamilton (D)
▌3. George R. Dennis (D)

==== Massachusetts ====
▌1. Charles Sumner (LR), until March 11, 1874

▌William B. Washburn (R), from April 17, 1874

▌2. George S. Boutwell (R), from March 17, 1873

==== Michigan ====
▌1. Zachariah Chandler (R)
▌2. Thomas W. Ferry (R)

==== Minnesota ====
▌1. Alexander Ramsey (R)
▌2. William Windom (R)

==== Mississippi ====
▌1. Adelbert Ames (R), until January 10, 1874

▌Henry R. Pease (R), from February 3, 1874

▌2. James L. Alcorn (R)

==== Missouri ====
▌1. Carl Schurz (R)
▌3. Lewis V. Bogy (D)

==== Nebraska ====
▌1. Thomas Tipton (R)
▌2. Phineas Hitchcock (R)

==== Nevada ====
▌1. William M. Stewart (R)
▌3. John P. Jones (R)

==== New Hampshire ====
▌2. Aaron H. Cragin (R)
▌3. Bainbridge Wadleigh (R)

==== New Jersey ====
▌1. John P. Stockton (D)
▌2. Frederick T. Frelinghuysen (R)

==== New York ====
▌1. Reuben E. Fenton (R)
▌3. Roscoe Conkling (R)

==== North Carolina ====
▌2. Matt W. Ransom (D)
▌3. Augustus Summerfield Merrimon (D)

==== Ohio ====
▌1. Allen G. Thurman (D)
▌3. John Sherman (R)

==== Oregon ====
▌2. James K. Kelly (D)
▌3. John H. Mitchell (R)

==== Pennsylvania ====
▌1. John Scott (R)
▌3. Simon Cameron (R)

==== Rhode Island ====
▌1. William Sprague IV (R)
▌2. Henry B. Anthony (R)

==== South Carolina ====
▌2. Thomas J. Robertson (R)
▌3. John J. Patterson (R)

==== Tennessee ====
▌1. Parson Brownlow (R)
▌2. Henry Cooper (D)

==== Texas ====
▌1. James W. Flanagan (R)
▌ 2. Morgan C. Hamilton (LR)

==== Vermont ====
▌1. George F. Edmunds (R)
▌3. Justin S. Morrill (R)

==== Virginia ====
▌1. John F. Lewis (R)
▌2. John W. Johnston (D)

==== West Virginia ====
▌1. Arthur I. Boreman (R)
▌2. Henry G. Davis (D)

==== Wisconsin ====
▌1. Matthew H. Carpenter (R)
▌3. Timothy O. Howe (R)

Senators' party membership by state at the opening of the 43rd Congress in March 1873. The green stripes represent Liberal Republicans. One of Louisiana's seats was never filled. 2 Democrats 1 Democrat and 1 Republican 2 Republicans Territories

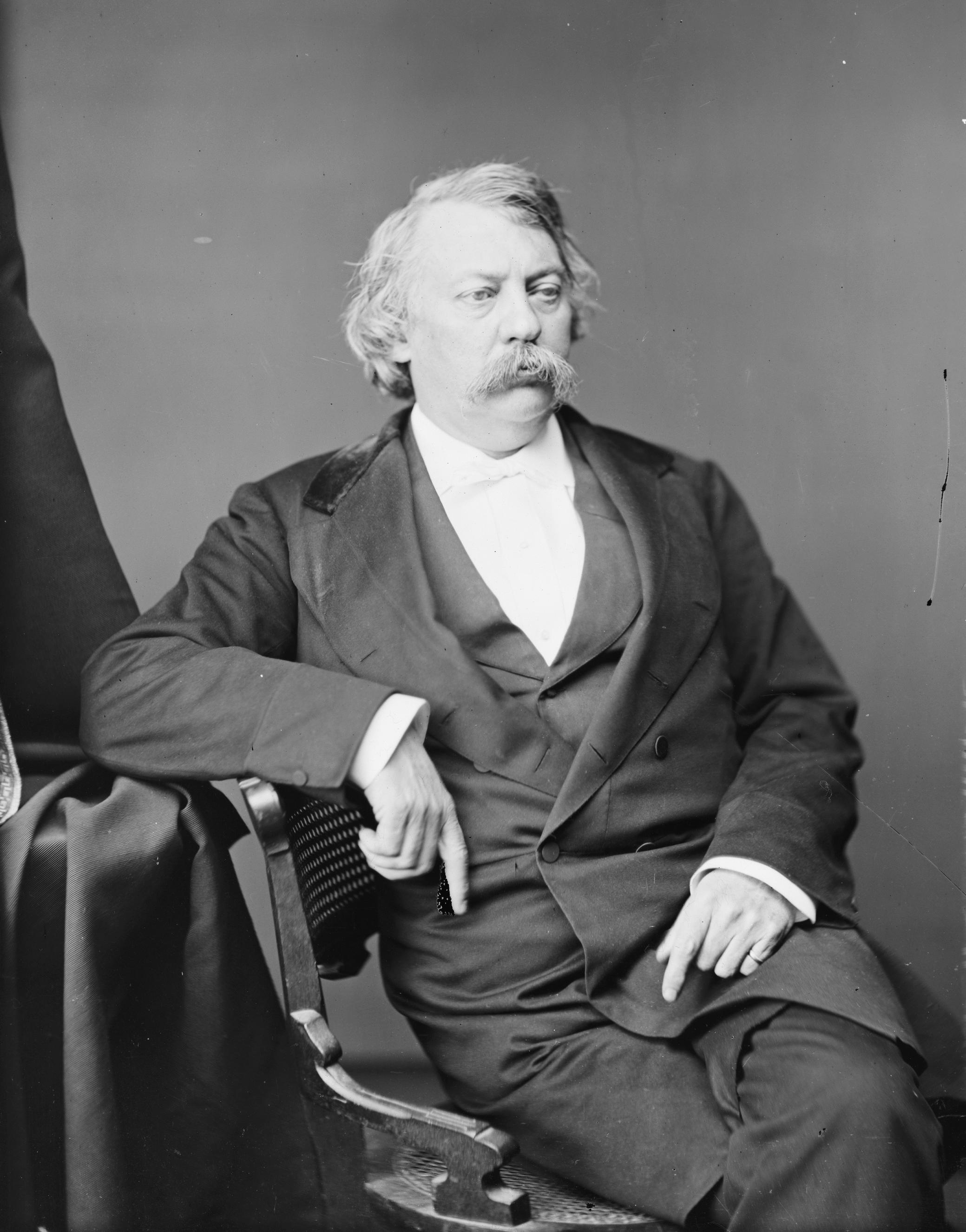
President pro tempore Matthew H. Carpenter

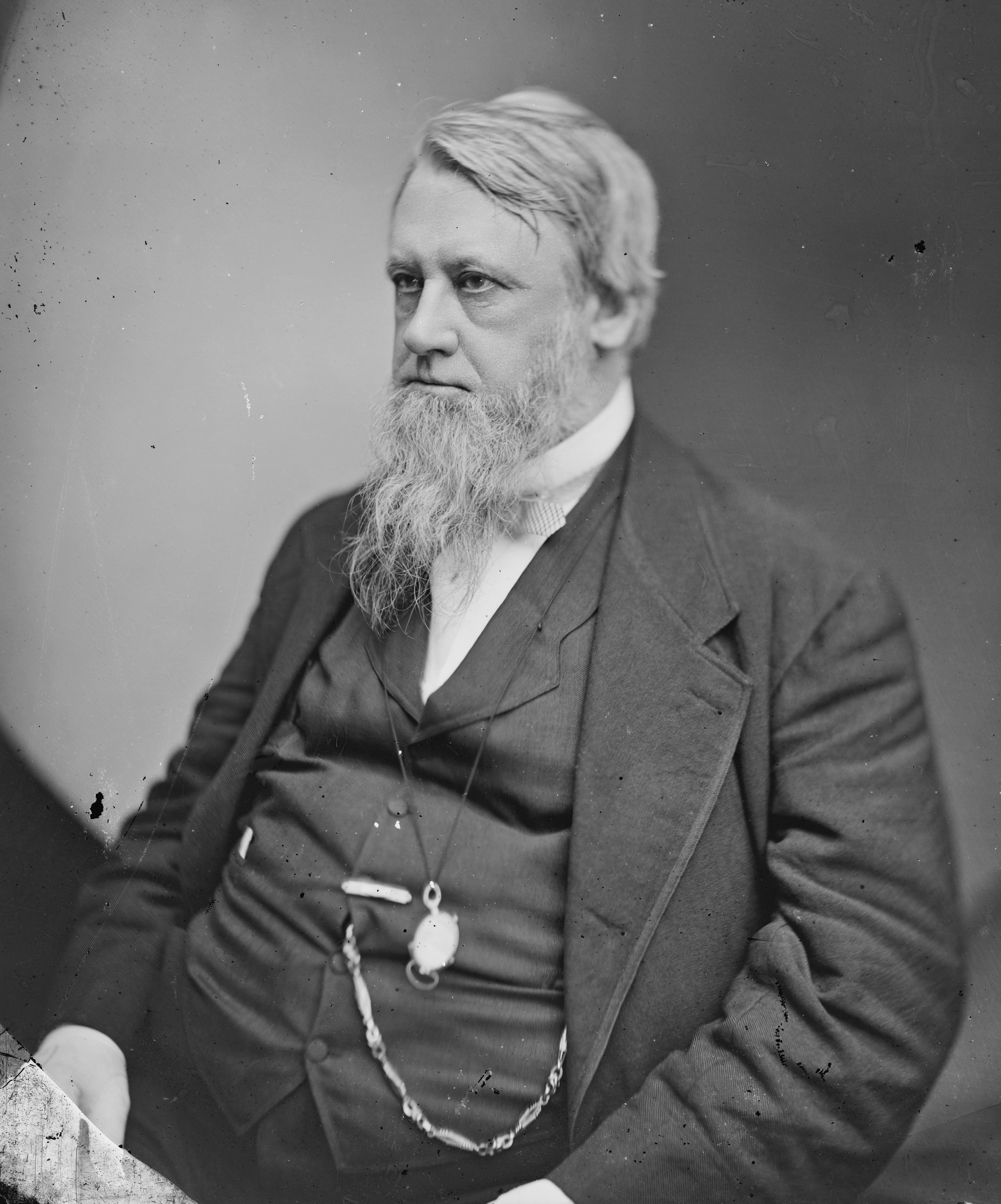
President pro tempore Henry B. Anthony

=== House of Representatives ===
The names of representatives are preceded by their district numbers.

==== Alabama ====
▌1. Frederick G. Bromberg (LR)
▌2. James T. Rapier (R)
▌3. Charles Pelham (R)
▌4. Charles Hays (R)
▌5. John Henry Caldwell (D)
▌6. Joseph H. Sloss (D)
▌At-large. Charles C. Sheats (R)
▌At-large. Alexander White (R)

==== Arkansas ====
▌1. Asa Hodges (R)
▌2. Oliver P. Snyder (R)
▌3. William W. Wilshire (R), until June 16, 1874

▌Thomas M. Gunter (D), from June 16, 1874

▌At-large. William J. Hynes (LR)

==== California ====
▌1. Charles Clayton (R)
▌2. Horace F. Page (R)
▌3. John K. Luttrell (D)
▌4. Sherman Otis Houghton (R)

==== Connecticut ====
▌1. Joseph R. Hawley (R)
▌2. Stephen Kellogg (R)
▌3. Henry H. Starkweather (R)
▌4. William Barnum (D)

==== Delaware ====
▌At-large. James R. Lofland (R)

==== Florida ====
▌At-large. Josiah T. Walls (R)
▌At-large. William J. Purman (R), until January 25, 1875

==== Georgia ====
▌1. Morgan Rawls (D), until March 24, 1874

▌Andrew Sloan (R), from March 24, 1874

▌2. Richard H. Whiteley (R)
▌3. Philip Cook (D)
▌4. Henry R. Harris (D)
▌5. James C. Freeman (R)
▌6. James Henderson Blount (D)
▌7. Pierce M. B. Young (D)
▌8. Alexander H. Stephens (D), from December 1, 1873
▌9. Hiram Parks Bell (D)

==== Illinois ====
▌1. John Blake Rice (R), until December 17, 1874

▌Bernard G. Caulfield (D), from February 1, 1875

▌2. Jasper D. Ward (R)
▌3. Charles B. Farwell (R)
▌4. Stephen A. Hurlbut (R)
▌5. Horatio C. Burchard (R)
▌6. John B. Hawley (R)
▌7. Franklin Corwin (R)
▌8. Greenbury L. Fort (R)
▌9. Granville Barrere (R)
▌10. William H. Ray (R)
▌11. Robert M. Knapp (D)
▌12. James Carroll Robinson (D)
▌13. John McNulta (R)
▌14. Joseph Gurney Cannon (R)
▌15. John R. Eden (D)
▌16. James Stewart Martin (R)
▌17. William Ralls Morrison (D)
▌18. Isaac Clements (R)
▌19. Samuel S. Marshall (D)

==== Indiana ====
▌1. William E. Niblack (D)
▌2. Simeon K. Wolfe (D)
▌3. William S. Holman (D)
▌4. Jeremiah M. Wilson (R)
▌5. John Coburn (R)
▌6. Morton C. Hunter (R)
▌7. Thomas J. Cason (R)
▌8. James Noble Tyner (R)
▌9. John P. C. Shanks (R)
▌10. Henry B. Sayler (R)
▌At-large. Jasper Packard (R)
▌At-large. Godlove S. Orth (R)
▌At-large. William Williams (R)

==== Iowa ====
▌1. George W. McCrary (R)
▌2. Aylett R. Cotton (R)
▌3. William G. Donnan (R)
▌4. Henry O. Pratt (R)
▌5. James Wilson (R)
▌6. William Loughridge (R)
▌7. John A. Kasson (R)
▌8. James W. McDill (R)
▌9. Jackson Orr (R)

==== Kansas ====
▌At-large. Stephen A. Cobb (R)
▌At-large. David P. Lowe (R)
▌At-large. William A. Phillips (R)

==== Kentucky ====
▌1. Edward Crossland (D)
▌2. John Y. Brown (D)
▌3. Charles W. Milliken (D)
▌4. William B. Read (D)
▌5. Elisha D. Standiford (D)
▌6. William E. Arthur (D)
▌7. James B. Beck (D)
▌8. Milton J. Durham (D)
▌9. George M. Adams (D)
▌10. John D. Young (D)

==== Louisiana ====
▌1. J. Hale Sypher (R), until March 3, 1875

▌Effingham Lawrence (D), from March 3, 1875

▌2. Lionel Allen Sheldon (R)
▌3. Chester Bidwell Darrall (R)
▌4. George Luke Smith (R), from November 24, 1873
▌5. Frank Morey (R)
▌At-large. George A. Sheridan (LR) from March 3, 1875

==== Maine ====
▌1. John H. Burleigh (R)
▌2. William P. Frye (R)
▌3. James G. Blaine (R)
▌4. Samuel F. Hersey (R), until February 3, 1875
▌5. Eugene Hale (R)

==== Maryland ====
▌1. Ephraim K. Wilson II (D)
▌2. Stevenson Archer (D)
▌3. William J. O'Brien (D)
▌4. Thomas Swann (D)
▌5. William Albert (R)
▌6. Lloyd Lowndes Jr. (R)

==== Massachusetts ====
▌1. James Buffington (R)
▌2. Benjamin W. Harris (R)
▌3. William Whiting (R), until June 29, 1873

▌Henry L. Pierce (R), from December 1, 1873

▌4. Samuel Hooper (R)
▌5. Daniel W. Gooch (R)
▌6. Benjamin F. Butler (R)
▌7. Ebenezer R. Hoar (R)
▌8. John M. S. Williams (R)
▌9. George F. Hoar (R)
▌10. Alvah Crocker (R), until December 26, 1874

▌Charles A. Stevens (R), from January 27, 1875

▌11. Henry L. Dawes (R)

==== Michigan ====
▌1. Moses W. Field (R)
▌2. Henry Waldron (R)
▌3. George Willard (R)
▌4. Julius C. Burrows (R)
▌5. Wilder D. Foster (R), until September 20, 1873

▌William B. Williams (R), from December 1, 1873

▌6. Josiah Begole (R)
▌7. Omar D. Conger (R)
▌8. Nathan B. Bradley (R)
▌9. Jay Hubbell (R)

==== Minnesota ====
▌1. Mark H. Dunnell (R)
▌2. Horace B. Strait (R)
▌3. John T. Averill (R)

==== Mississippi ====
▌1. Lucius Quintus Cincinnatus Lamar (D)
▌2. Albert R. Howe (R)
▌3. Henry W. Barry (R)
▌4. Jason Niles (R)
▌5. George C. McKee (R)
▌6. John R. Lynch (R)

==== Missouri ====
▌1. Edwin O. Stanard (R)
▌2. Erastus Wells (D)
▌3. William Henry Stone (D)
▌4. Robert A. Hatcher (D)
▌5. Richard P. Bland (D)
▌6. Harrison E. Havens (R)
▌7. Thomas Theodore Crittenden (D)
▌8. Abram Comingo (D)
▌9. Isaac C. Parker (R)
▌10. Ira B. Hyde (R)
▌11. John Bullock Clark Jr. (D)
▌12. John Montgomery Glover (D)
▌13. Aylett H. Buckner (D)

==== Nebraska ====
▌At-large. Lorenzo Crounse (R)

==== Nevada ====
▌At-large. Charles West Kendall (D)

==== New Hampshire ====
▌1. William B. Small (R)
▌2. Austin F. Pike (R)
▌3. Hosea W. Parker (D)

==== New Jersey ====
▌1. John W. Hazelton (R)
▌2. Samuel A. Dobbins (R)
▌3. Amos Clark Jr. (R)
▌4. Robert Hamilton (D)
▌5. William Walter Phelps (R)
▌6. Marcus Lawrence Ward (R)
▌7. Isaac W. Scudder (R)

==== New York ====
▌1. Henry J. Scudder (R)
▌2. John G. Schumaker (D)
▌3. Stewart L. Woodford (R), until July 1, 1874

▌Simeon B. Chittenden (IR), from November 3, 1874

▌4. Philip S. Crooke (R)
▌5. William R. Roberts (D)
▌6. James Brooks (D), until April 30, 1873

▌Samuel S. Cox (D), from November 4, 1873

▌7. Thomas J. Creamer (D)
▌8. John D. Lawson (R)
▌9. David B. Mellish (R), until May 23, 1874

▌Richard Schell (D), from December 7, 1874

▌10. Fernando Wood (D)
▌11. Clarkson Nott Potter (D)
▌12. Charles St. John (R)
▌13. John O. Whitehouse (D)
▌14. David M. De Witt (D)
▌15. Eli Perry (D)
▌16. James S. Smart (R)
▌17. Robert S. Hale (R)
▌18. William A. Wheeler (R)
▌19. Henry H. Hathorn (R)
▌20. David Wilber (R)
▌21. Clinton L. Merriam (R)
▌22. Ellis H. Roberts (R)
▌23. William E. Lansing (R)
▌24. R. Holland Duell (R)
▌25. Clinton D. MacDougall (R)
▌26. William H. Lamport (R)
▌27. Thomas C. Platt (R)
▌28. Horace B. Smith (R)
▌29. Freeman Clarke (R)
▌30. George G. Hoskins (R)
▌31. Lyman K. Bass (R)
▌32. Walter L. Sessions (R)
▌At-large. Lyman Tremain (R)

==== North Carolina ====
▌1. Clinton L. Cobb (R)
▌2. Charles R. Thomas (R)
▌3. Alfred Moore Waddell (D)
▌4. William A. Smith (R)
▌5. James M. Leach (D)
▌6. Thomas Samuel Ashe (D)
▌7. William M. Robbins (D)
▌8. Robert B. Vance (D)

==== Ohio ====
▌1. Milton Sayler (D)
▌2. Henry B. Banning (LR)
▌3. John Quincy Smith (R)
▌4. Lewis B. Gunckel (R)
▌5. Charles N. Lamison (D)
▌6. Isaac R. Sherwood (R)
▌7. Lawrence T. Neal (D)
▌8. William Lawrence (R)
▌9. James Wallace Robinson (R)
▌10. Charles Foster (R)
▌11. Hezekiah S. Bundy (R)
▌12. Hugh J. Jewett (D), until June 23, 1874

▌William E. Finck (D), from December 7, 1874

▌13. Milton I. Southard (D)
▌14. John Berry (D)
▌15. William P. Sprague (R)
▌16. Lorenzo Danford (R)
▌17. Laurin D. Woodworth (R)
▌18. James Monroe (R)
▌19. James A. Garfield (R)
▌20. Richard C. Parsons (R)

==== Oregon ====
▌At-large. Joseph G. Wilson (R), until July 2, 1873

▌James W. Nesmith (D), from December 1, 1873

==== Pennsylvania ====
▌1. Samuel J. Randall (D)
▌2. Charles O'Neill (R)
▌3. Leonard Myers (R)
▌4. William D. Kelley (R)
▌5. Alfred C. Harmer (R)
▌6. James S. Biery (R)
▌7. Washington Townsend (R)
▌8. Hiester Clymer (D)
▌9. A. Herr Smith (R)
▌10. John W. Killinger (R)
▌11. John B. Storm (D)
▌12. Lazarus D. Shoemaker (R)
▌13. James Dale Strawbridge (R)
▌14. John B. Packer (R)
▌15. John A. Magee (D)
▌16. John Cessna (R)
▌17. R. Milton Speer (D)
▌18. Sobieski Ross (R)
▌19. Carlton B. Curtis (R)
▌20. Hiram L. Richmond (R)
▌21. Alexander W. Taylor (R)
▌22. James S. Negley (R)
▌23. Ebenezer McJunkin (R), until January 1, 1875

▌John McCandless Thompson (R), from January 5, 1875

▌24. William S. Moore (R)
▌At-large. Charles Albright (R)
▌At-large. Glenni W. Scofield (R)
▌At-large. Lemuel Todd (R)

==== Rhode Island ====
▌1. Benjamin T. Eames (R)
▌2. James M. Pendleton (R)

==== South Carolina ====
▌1. Joseph Rainey (R)
▌2. Alonzo J. Ransier (R)
▌3. Robert B. Elliott (R), until November 1, 1874

▌Lewis C. Carpenter (R), from November 3, 1874

▌4. Alexander S. Wallace (R)
▌At-large. Richard H. Cain (R)

==== Tennessee ====
▌1. Roderick R. Butler (R)
▌2. Jacob Montgomery Thornburgh (R)
▌3. William Crutchfield (R)
▌4. John M. Bright (D)
▌5. Horace Harrison (R)
▌6. Washington C. Whitthorne (D)
▌7. John D. C. Atkins (D)
▌8. David A. Nunn (R)
▌9. Barbour Lewis (R)
▌At-large. Horace Maynard (R)

==== Texas ====
▌1. William S. Herndon (D)
▌2. William P. McLean (D)
▌3. D. C. Giddings (D)
▌4. John Hancock (D)
▌At-large. Roger Q. Mills (D)
▌At-large. Asa H. Willie (D)

==== Vermont ====
▌1. Charles W. Willard (R)
▌2. Luke P. Poland (R)
▌3. George W. Hendee (R)

==== Virginia ====
▌1. James B. Sener (R)
▌2. James H. Platt Jr. (R)
▌3. J. Ambler Smith (R)
▌4. William H. H. Stowell (R)
▌5. Alexander Davis (D), until March 5, 1874

▌Christopher Thomas (R), from March 5, 1874

▌6. Thomas Whitehead (D)
▌7. John T. Harris (D)
▌8. Eppa Hunton (D)
▌9. Rees Bowen (D)

==== West Virginia ====
▌1. John James Davis (ID)
▌2. John Hagans (R)
▌3. Frank Hereford (D)

==== Wisconsin ====
▌1. Charles G. Williams (R)
▌2. Gerry Whiting Hazelton (R)
▌3. J. Allen Barber (R)
▌4. Alexander Mitchell (D)
▌5. Charles A. Eldredge (D)
▌6. Philetus Sawyer (R)
▌7. Jeremiah M. Rusk (R)
▌8. Alexander S. McDill (R)

==== Non-voting members ====
▌Arizona Territory. Richard C. McCormick (NU)
▌Colorado Territory. Jerome B. Chaffee (R)
▌Dakota Territory. Moses K. Armstrong (D)
▌District of Columbia. Norton P. Chipman (R)
▌Idaho Territory. John Hailey (D)
▌Montana Territory. Martin Maginnis (D)
▌New Mexico Territory. Stephen B. Elkins (R)
▌Utah Territory. George Q. Cannon (R)
▌Washington Territory. Obadiah B. McFadden (D)
▌Wyoming Territory. William R. Steele (D)

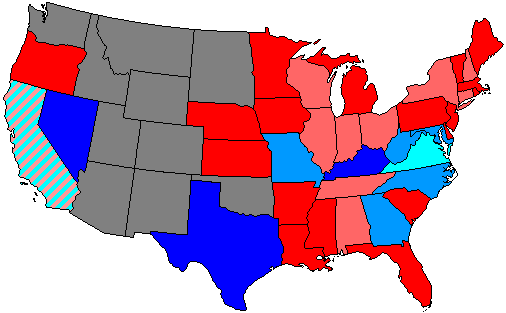
House seats by party holding plurality in state: 80+% Democratic / 80+% Republican; 60+% to 80% Democratic / 60+% to 80% Republican; Up to 60% Democratic / Up to 60% Republican

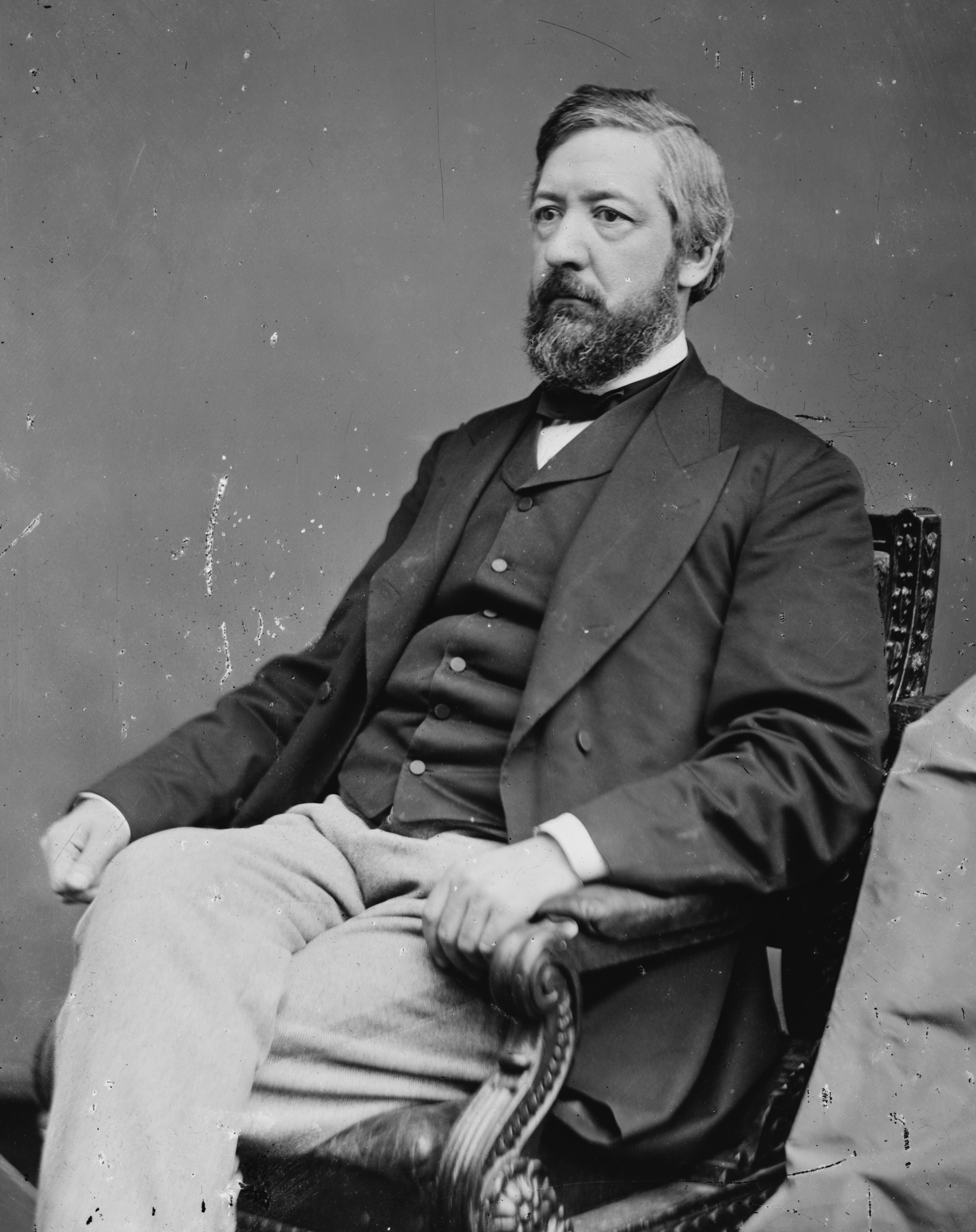
Speaker James G. Blaine

== Changes in membership ==
The count below reflects changes from the beginning of the first session of this Congress.

=== Senate ===
- Replacements: 5
  - Democratic: 1 seat net gain
  - Republican: no net change
  - Liberal Republican: 1 seat net loss
- Deaths: 3
- Resignations: 3
- Interim appointments: 1
- Vacancy: 1
- Total seats with changes: 7

Senate changes
State (class)	Vacated by	Reason for change	Successor	Date of successor's formal installation (Note: When seated or oath administered, not necessarily when service began.)
Massachusetts (2)	Vacant	Henry Wilson resigned in previous congress after becoming Vice President of the United States. Successor elected March 17, 1873.	George S. Boutwell (R)	March 17, 1873
Mississippi (1)	Adelbert Ames (R)	Resigned March 17, 1873, after being elected Governor of Mississippi. Successor elected February 3, 1874.	Henry R. Pease (R)	February 3, 1874
Kansas (2)	Alexander Caldwell (R)	Resigned March 24, 1873. Successor appointed November 24, 1873.	Robert Crozier (R)	November 24, 1873
California (1)	Eugene Casserly (D)	Resigned November 29, 1873. Successor elected December 23, 1873.	John S. Hager (D)	December 23, 1873
Kansas (2)	Robert Crozier (R)	Interim appointee retired when successor elected February 2, 1874.	James M. Harvey (R)	February 2, 1874
Massachusetts (1)	Charles Sumner (LR)	Died March 11, 1874. Successor elected April 17, 1874.	William B. Washburn (R)	April 17, 1874
Connecticut (1)	William A. Buckingham (R)	Died February 5, 1875. Successor appointed February 5, 1875, having already been elected to the next tern.	William W. Eaton (D)	February 5, 1875

=== House of Representatives ===
- Replacements: 15
  - Democratic: 3 seat net gain
  - Republican: 4 seat net loss
  - Liberal Republican: 1 seat net gain
- Deaths: 8
- Resignations: 5
- Contested election: 4
- Total seats with changes: 19

House changes
District	Vacated by	Reason for change	Successor	Date of successor's formal installation
Louisiana 4th	Vacant	Rep-elect Samuel Peters died before taking seat	George Luke Smith (R)	November 24, 1873
Georgia 8th	Vacant	Rep-elect Ambrose R. Wright died before taking seat	Alexander H. Stephens (D)	December 1, 1873
New York 6th	James Brooks (D)	Died April 30, 1873	Samuel S. Cox (D)	November 4, 1873
Massachusetts 3rd	William Whiting (R)	Died June 29, 1873	Henry L. Pierce (R)	December 1, 1873
Oregon At-large	Joseph G. Wilson (R)	Died July 2, 1873	James Nesmith (D)	December 1, 1873
Michigan 5th	Wilder D. Foster (R)	Died September 20, 1873	William B. Williams (R)	December 1, 1873
Virginia 5th	Alexander Davis (D)	Lost contested election March 5, 1874	Christopher Thomas (R)	March 5, 1874
Georgia 1st	Morgan Rawls (D)	Lost contested election March 24, 1874	Andrew Sloan (R)	March 24, 1874
New York 9th	David B. Mellish (R)	Died May 23, 1874	Richard Schell (D)	December 7, 1874
Arkansas 3rd	William W. Wilshire (R)	Lost contested election June 16, 1874	Thomas M. Gunter (D)	June 16, 1874
Ohio 12th	Hugh J. Jewett (D)	Resigned June 23, 1874, after becoming President of the Erie Railroad	William E. Finck (D)	December 7, 1874
New York 3rd	Stewart L. Woodford (R)	Resigned July 1, 1874	Simeon B. Chittenden (IR)	November 3, 1874
South Carolina 3rd	Robert B. Elliott (R)	Resigned November 1, 1874	Lewis C. Carpenter (R)	November 3, 1874
Illinois 1st	John Blake Rice (R)	Died December 17, 1874	Bernard G. Caulfield (D)	February 1, 1875
Massachusetts 10th	Alvah Crocker (R)	Died December 26, 1874	Charles A. Stevens (R)	January 27, 1875
Pennsylvania 23rd	Ebenezer McJunkin (R)	Resigned January 1, 1875	John McCandless Thompson (R)	January 5, 1875
Florida At-large	William J. Purman (R)	Resigned January 25, 1875	Vacant	Not filled this term
Maine 4th	Samuel F. Hersey (R)	Died February 3, 1875	Vacant	Not filled this term
Louisiana 1st	J. Hale Sypher (R)	Lost contested election March 3, 1875	Effingham Lawrence (D)	March 3, 1875
Louisiana At-Large	Vacant	Contested election originally won by Pinckney Pinchback	George A. Sheridan (R)	March 3, 1875

== Committees ==
Lists of committees and their party leaders for members of the House and Senate committees can be found through the Official Congressional Directory at the bottom of this article. The directory after the pages of terms of service lists committees of the Senate, House (Standing with Subcommittees, Select and Special) and Joint and, after that, House/Senate committee assignments. On the committees section of the House and Senate in the Official Congressional Directory, the committee's members on the first row on the left side shows the chairman of the committee and on the right side shows the ranking member of the committee.

=== Senate ===
- Agriculture (Chairman: Frederick T. Frelinghuysen; Ranking Member: George R. Dennis)
- Appropriations (Chairman: Lot M. Morrill; Ranking Member: William B. Allison)
- Audit and Control the Contingent Expenses of the Senate (Chairman: Matthew H. Carpenter; Ranking Member: George R. Dennis)
- Civil Service and Retrenchment (Chairman: George G. Wright; Ranking Member: Timothy O. Howe)
- Claims (Chairman: John Scott; Ranking Member: George S. Boutwell)
- Commerce (Chairman: Zachariah Chandler; Ranking Member: George S. Boutwell)
- Distributing Public Revenue Among the States (Select)
- District of Columbia (Chairman: John F. Lewis; Ranking Member: John P. Jones)
- Education and Labor (Chairman: James W. Flanagan; Ranking Member: Oliver P. Morton)
- Engrossed Bills (Chairman: Thomas F. Bayard; Ranking Member: Henry Cooper)
- Finance (Chairman: John Sherman; Ranking Member: Thomas W. Ferry)
- Foreign Relations (Chairman: Simon Cameron; Ranking Member: Roscoe Conkling)
- Indian Affairs (Chairman: William A. Buckingham; Ranking Member: John J. Ingalls)
- Judiciary (Chairman: George F. Edmunds; Ranking Member: George G. Wright)
- Manufactures (Chairman: Thomas J. Robertson; Ranking Member: Reuben E. Fenton)
- Military Affairs (Chairman: John A. Logan; Ranking Member: Bainbridge Wadleigh)
- Mines and Mining (Chairman: Hannibal Hamlin; Ranking Member: George Goldthwaite)
- Mississippi River Levee System (Select)
- Naval Affairs (Chairman: Aaron H. Cragin; Ranking Member: Simon B. Conover)
- Ordnance and War Ships (Select)
- Outrages in Southern States (Select)
- Patents (Chairman: Orris S. Ferry; Ranking Member: William T. Hamilton)
- Pensions (Chairman: Daniel D. Pratt; Ranking Member: Morgan C. Hamilton)
- Post Office and Post Roads (Chairman: Alexander Ramsey; Ranking Member: John P. Jones)
- Private Land Claims (Chairman: Allen G. Thurman; Ranking Member: Thomas F. Bayard)
- Privileges and Elections (Chairman: Oliver P. Morton; Ranking Member: John H. Mitchell)
- Public Buildings and Grounds (Chairman: Justin S. Morrill; Ranking Member: John J. Patterson)
- Public Lands (Chairman: William Sprague; Ranking Member: Bainbridge Wadleigh)
- Railroads (Chairman: William M. Stewart; Ranking Member: Timothy O. Howe)
- Removal of Political Disabilities (Select)
- Retrenchment
- Revision of the Laws (Chairman: Hannibal Hamlin; Ranking Member: James L. Alcorn)
- Revolutionary Claims (Chairman: William G. Brownlow; Ranking Member: John W. Johnston)
- Rules (Select)
- Tariff Regulation (Select)
- Territories (Chairman: Arthur I. Boreman; Ranking Member: John J. Patterson)
- Transportation Routes to the Seaboard (Select) (Chairman: William Windom; Ranking Member: John H. Mitchell)
- Whole

=== House of Representatives ===
- Accounts (Chairman: James Buffington; Ranking Member: Alexander S. Wallace)
- Agriculture (Chairman: Charles Hays; Ranking Member: Sobieski Ross)
- Appropriations (Chairman: James A. Garfield; Ranking Member: James N. Tyner)
- Alabama Affairs (Select)
- Arkansas Affairs (Select)
- Banking and Currency (Chairman: Horace Maynard; Ranking Member: Jay Abel Hubbell)
- Claims (Chairman: John B. Hawley; Ranking Member: Julius C. Burrows)
- Coinage, Weights and Measures (Chairman: Samuel Hooper; Ranking Member: Horace B. Strait)
- Commerce (Chairman: William A. Wheeler; Ranking Member: Richard C. Parsons)
- District of Columbia (Chairman: Alfred C. Harmer; Ranking Member: Charles Pelham)
- Education and Labor (Chairman: James Monroe; Ranking Member: Alexander S. McDill)
- Elections (Chairman: Horace B. Smith; Ranking Member: Horace H. Harrison)
- Expenditures in the Interior Department (Chairman: Jackson Orr; Ranking Member: James Carroll Robinson)
- Expenditures in the Justice Department (Chairman: James B. Sener; Ranking Member: R. Milton Speer)
- Expenditures in the Navy Department (Chairman: Julius C. Burrows; Ranking Member: John A. Magee)
- Expenditures in the Post Office Department (Chairman: Henry W. Barry; Ranking Member: Pierce M. B. Young)
- Expenditures in the State Department (Chairman: Jasper Packard; Ranking Member: William R. Morrison)
- Expenditures in the Treasury Department (Chairman: J. Hale Sypher; Ranking Member: John G. Schumaker)
- Expenditures in the War Department (Chairman: William Williams; Ranking Member: John M. Bright)
- Expenditures on Public Buildings (Chairman: R. Holland Duell; Ranking Member: Henry O. Pratt)
- Freedmen's Affairs (Chairman: Clinton L. Cobb; Ranking Member: J. Allen Barber)
- Foreign Affairs (Chairman: Godlove Stein Orth; Ranking Member: William J. Albert)
- Indian Affairs (Chairman: John T. Averill; Ranking Member: John D. Lawson)
- Invalid Pensions (Chairman: Jeremiah McLain Rusk; Ranking Member: William B. Small)
- Judiciary (Chairman: Benjamin F. Butler; Ranking Member: Alexander White)
- Manufactures (Chairman: Charles B. Farwell; Ranking Member: Laurin D. Woodworth)
- Mileage (Chairman: Hezekiah S. Bundy; Ranking Member: James W. Nesmith)
- Military Affairs (Chairman: John Coburn; Ranking Member: Clinton D. MacDougall)
- Militia (Chairman: Roderick R. Butler; Ranking Member: Josiah T. Walls)
- Mines and Mining (Chairman: David P. Lowe; Ranking Member: Christopher C. Sheats)
- Naval Affairs (Chairman: Glenni W. Scofield; Ranking Member: John H. Burleigh)
- Pacific Railroads (Chairman: Philetus Sawyer; Ranking Member: James W. McDill)
- Patents (Chairman: Omar D. Conger; Ranking Member: Henry B. Sayler)
- Post Office and Post Roads (Chairman: John B. Packer; Ranking Member: Stephen A. Cobb)
- Private Land Claims (Chairman: Jasper Packard; Ranking Member: James C. Freeman)
- Public Buildings and Grounds (Chairman: James H. Platt Jr.; Ranking Member: Lloyd Lowndes Jr.)
- Public Expenditures (Chairman: Harrison E. Havens; Ranking Member: Josiah W. Begole)
- Public Lands (Chairman: Washington Townsend; Ranking Member: William A. Phillips)
- Railways and Canals (Chairman: George W. McCrary; Ranking Member: Alexander W. Taylor)
- Reform on Civil Service (Chairman: Stephen W. Kellogg; Ranking Member: James D. Strawbridge)
- Revision of Laws (Chairman: Luke P. Poland; Ranking Member: William S. Moore)
- Revolutionary Pensions and War of 1812 (Chairman: Lazarus D. Shoemaker; Ranking Member: William Crutchfield)
- Rules (Select) (Chairman: James G. Blaine; Ranking Member: Samuel S. Cox)
- Standards of Official Conduct
- Territories (Chairman: George C. McKee; Ranking Member: Greenbury L. Fort)
- War Claims (Chairman: William Lawrence; Ranking Member: Abraham H. Smith)
- Ways and Means (Chairman: Henry L. Dawes; Ranking Member: Lionel A. Sheldon)
- Whole

=== Joint committees ===
- Conditions of Indian Tribes (Special)
- Enrolled Bills (Chairman: Rep. Chester B. Darrall; Vice Chairman: Rep. Henry R. Harris)
- Inquire into the Affairs of the District of Columbia (Select) (Chairman: Rep. Jeremiah M. Wilson; Vice Chairman: Rep. Hugh J. Jewett)
- The Library (Chairman: Rep. William P. Frye; Vice Chairman: Rep. Hiester Clymer)
- Printing (Chairman: Rep. William G. Donnan; Vice Chairman: Rep. Alfred M. Waddell)

== Caucuses ==
- Democratic (House)
- Democratic (Senate)

== Employees ==
=== Legislative branch agency directors ===
- Architect of the Capitol: Edward Clark
- Librarian of Congress: Ainsworth Rand Spofford

=== Senate ===
- Chaplain: John P. Newman (Methodist), until December 8, 1873
  - Byron Sunderland (Presbyterian), elected December 8, 1873
- Librarian: George S. Wagner
- Secretary: George C. Gorham
- Sergeant at Arms: John R. French

=== House of Representatives ===
- Chaplain: John G. Butler (Presbyterian)
- Clerk: Edward McPherson
- Clerk at the Speaker's Table: John M. Barclay
- Doorkeeper: Otis S. Buxton
- Postmaster: Henry Sherwood, elected December 1, 1873
- Reading Clerks: Charles N. Clisbee (D) and William K. Mehaffey (R)
- Sergeant at Arms: Nehemiah G. Ordway

== See also ==
- 1872 United States elections (elections leading to this Congress)
  - 1872 United States presidential election
  - 1872–73 United States Senate elections
  - 1872–73 United States House of Representatives elections
- 1874 United States elections (elections during this Congress, leading to the next Congress)
  - 1874–75 United States Senate elections
  - 1874–75 United States House of Representatives elections
