= Rhode Island Maximum Security Prison =

Prison in Rhode Island, United States

Coordinates: 41°44′48″N 71°27′22″W

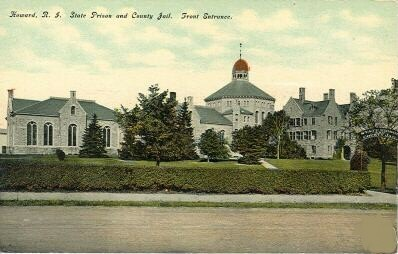
- circa 1900
- Interactive map of Rhode Island Maximum Security Prison
- Location: Cranston, Rhode Island
- Status: open
- Capacity: 430
- Opened: 1878
- Managed by: Rhode Island Department of Corrections
- Director: James Weeden, Warden

Rhode Island Maximum Security Prison, formerly known as Howard Prison, is a Rhode Island Department of Corrections state prison for men located in Cranston, Rhode Island. It is the state's oldest operational prison, with a current capacity of 430.

The facility was first completed in 1878 as the State Prison and Providence County Jail. The design, based on New York's Auburn system of confinement and including a distinctive octagonal stone tower, was the work of Providence architects Stone and Carpenter. Warden Nelson Viall, who during the Civil War had commanded the 14th Rhode Island Heavy Artillery (Colored), managed the facility until his death in 1903. The prison was expanded in 1924.

The prison is also the oldest element of the state correctional complex which includes the adjacent High Security Center (HSC), the Anthony P. Travisono Intake Service Center, and the John J. Moran Medium Security Facility.

Rhode Island has no death penalty and no death row.
