= 11th United States Colored Heavy Artillery Regiment =

- Active: August 28, 1863, to October 2, 1865
- Country: United States
- Allegiance: Union
- Branch: Heavy artillery
- Type: Regiment
- Engagements: American Civil War

Commanders
- Lieutenant colonel: Nelson Viall

The 11th United States Colored Heavy Artillery Regiment, previously designated the 14th Rhode Island Heavy Artillery Regiment (Colored), was an African American artillery regiment that served in the Union Army during the American Civil War.

== Service ==
The 14th Rhode Island Heavy Artillery (Colored) was organized in Providence, Rhode Island, and mustered on August 28, 1863, for three years service.

The regiment served unattached, XIII Corps, Department of the Gulf, to May 1864 (1st Battalion). Defenses of New Orleans, Department of the Gulf, to October 1865.

The 14th Rhode Island Heavy Artillery Regiment (Colored) officially ceased to exist when the designation of the regiment was first changed to 8th United States Colored Heavy Artillery Regiment on April 4, 1864, and later to 11th United States Colored Heavy Artillery Regiment on May 21, 1864. The 11th United States Colored Heavy Artillery mustered out of service October 2, 1865, at New Orleans, Louisiana.

== Detailed service ==
The units of the regiment were originally trained on organized on Dutch Island in Narragansett Bay. There were three battalions formed. The 1st and 3rd Battalions served together at Camp Parapet in New Orleans. The 2nd Battalion was stationed at English Turn in Plaquemine near New Orleans.

The 1st Battalion moved to New Orleans, Louisiana, December 19–30, 1863, then to Pass Cavallo, Texas, December 31, 1863 – January 8, 1864. The 1st Battalion assigned to garrison duty at Fort Esperanza, Matagorda Island, Texas, until May 19, 1864. Moved to Camp Parapet, New Orleans, La., May 19–23; joined 3rd Battalion and served duty there until July 1864. Ordered to Port Hudson, Louisiana, and garrison duty there until April 1865. Duty at Brashear City and New Orleans until October 1865.

the 2nd Battalion moved to New Orleans January 8 - February 3, 1864. Duty in the Defenses of New Orleans at English Turn and at Plaquemine until October 1865. Expedition from Brashear City to Ratliff's Plantation May 14–16, 1865 (detachment). Action at Indian Village, Plaquemine Parish, on August 6, 1864, in which three soldiers were captured and later executed by insurgent forces.

The 3rd Battalion moved to New Orleans, April 3–15, and duty at Camp Parapet until October 1865. The regiment was mustered out of service on October 2, 1865.

As the regiment served in two different locations it never assembled as a whole until after it had been mustered out of service. The regiment's commander, Colonel J. Hale Sypher, served on court martial duty throughout the regiment's service and never exercised operational control over the regiment.

The de facto commander of the regiment was Lieutenant Colonel Nelson Viall, who was noted for his concern for the well-being of his soldiers. Viall had previously served as colonel of the 2nd Rhode Island Infantry but accepted a reduction in rank to serve with the 14th Rhode Island. After the war he served as the warden of the Rhode Island State Prison from 1869 until his death in 1903.

== See also ==
- List of Rhode Island Civil War units
- List of United States Colored Troops Civil War units
- Rhode Island in the American Civil War
- United States Colored Troops
