= Charles A. Stevens =

American politician

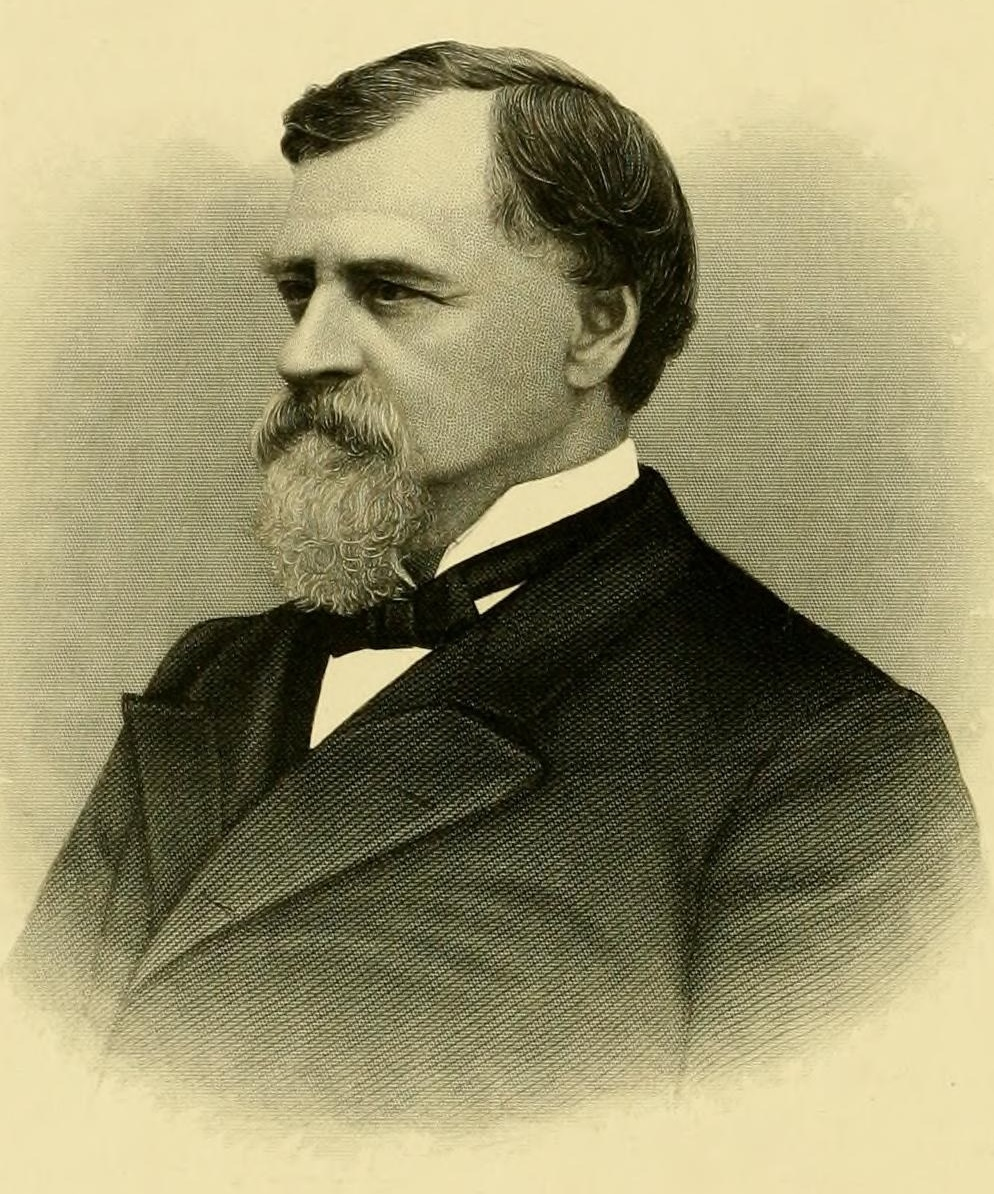

Member of the U.S. House of Representatives from Massachusetts's 10th district
- In office January 27, 1875 – March 3, 1875
- Preceded by: Alvah Crocker
- Succeeded by: Julius Hawley Seelye

Personal details
- Born: August 9, 1816 North Andover, Massachusetts
- Died: April 7, 1892 (aged 75) New York City
- Party: Republican
- Relations: Moses T. Stevens (brother); Isaac Stevens (cousin)
- Occupation: Manufacturing executive

Charles Abbot Stevens (August 9, 1816 – April 7, 1892) was a U.S. representative from Massachusetts, brother of Moses Tyler Stevens and cousin of Isaac Ingalls Stevens.

== Biography ==
Born in North Andover (then a part of Andover), Essex County, Massachusetts, Stevens attended Franklin Academy.

In 1841 he went into business as a manufacturer of flannels and broadcloths in Ware, Massachusetts.

An anti-slavery activist, he was a member of the Free Soil Party in the 1840s. He served as member of the Massachusetts House of Representatives in 1853.

Stevens became a Republican when the party was founded, and was a Delegate to the Republican National Conventions in 1860 and 1868.

He served as a member of the Governor's council from 1867 to 1870.

He was unsuccessful for election in 1874 to the Forty-fourth Congress.

He was subsequently elected as a Republican to the Forty-third Congress to fill the vacancy caused by the death of Alvah Crocker and served from January 27 to March 3, 1875.

He did not run for a full term, and continued his business interests. Stevens died in New York City on April 7, 1892. He was interred in Aspen Grove Cemetery, Ware, Massachusetts.

U.S. House of Representatives
Preceded by Alvah Crocker	Member of the U.S. House of Representatives from Massachusetts's 10th congressional district January 27, 1875–March 3, 1875	Succeeded by Julius H. Seelye
