= William W. Paine =

American politician

William Wiseham Paine

Member of the U.S. House of Representatives from Georgia's 1st district
- In office December 22, 1870 – March 3, 1871
- Preceded by: Joseph Clift
- Succeeded by: Archibald T. MacIntyre

Personal details
- Born: October 10, 1817 Richmond, Virginia, U.S.
- Died: August 5, 1882 (aged 64) Savannah, Georgia, U.S.
- Resting place: Bonaventure Cemetery
- Party: Democratic

William Wiseham Paine (October 10, 1817 – August 5, 1882) was a U.S. Representative from Georgia.

Born in Richmond, Virginia, Paine moved with his parents to Milledgeville, Georgia, in 1827. He attended school in Mount Zion, Georgia. He served in the Seminole Indian War in 1836. He studied law in Washington, Georgia, and was admitted to the bar in 1838. He moved to Telfair, Georgia, in 1840 and commenced the practice of law. He served as member of the State constitutional convention in 1850. He served as private secretary to Gov. Howell Cobb in 1851 and 1852. He served in the Georgia State Senate in 1857–1860. He entered the Confederate States Army and served as captain in the First Georgia Regiment throughout the Civil War. He moved to Savannah, Georgia, at the close of the Civil War and continued the practice of law.

Paine was elected as a Democrat to the Forty-first Congress to fill the vacancy caused by the House declaring Joseph W. Clift not entitled to the seat, and served from December 22, 1870, to March 3, 1871. He served as member of the State house of representatives in 1877–79. Curator of the Georgia Historical Society. He died in Savannah on August 5, 1882, and was interred in Bonaventure Cemetery.

U.S. House of Representatives
| Preceded by Joseph Clift | Member of the U.S. House of Representatives from Georgia's 1st congressional district December 22, 1870 – March 3, 1871 | Succeeded by Archibald T. MacIntyre |
