= Thomas M. Bayne =

American politician and army officer

Thomas McKee Bayne
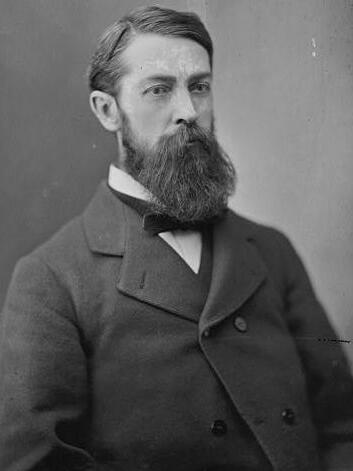

Member of the United States House of Representatives from Pennsylvania's 23rd district
- In office March 4, 1877 – March 3, 1891
- Preceded by: Alexander G. Cochran
- Succeeded by: William A. Stone

Personal details
- Born: June 14, 1836 Bellevue, Pennsylvania, U.S.
- Died: June 16, 1894 (aged 58) Washington, D.C., U.S.
- Party: Republican

Thomas McKee Bayne (June 14, 1836 – June 16, 1894) was an officer in the Union Army during the American Civil War, a lawyer, a district attorney, and a Republican member of the U.S. House of Representatives from Pennsylvania.

Towards the end of his life, Bayne was worried that he may be suffering from a lung hemorrhage. He shot himself dead, two days after his 58th birthday.

== Career ==
Bayne was born in Bellevue, Pennsylvania. He attended the public schools and Westminster College in New Wilmington, Pennsylvania. He studied law. During the American Civil War, he entered the Union Army in July 1862 as colonel of the 136th Pennsylvania Infantry.

He took part in the battles of Fredericksburg and Chancellorsville. He resumed the study of law in 1865, and was admitted to the bar of Allegheny County in April 1866. He was elected as district attorney for Allegheny County, Pennsylvania in October 1870 and held the office until January 1, 1874.

Bayne was an unsuccessful candidate for election in 1874. He was elected as a Republican to the Forty-fifth and to the six succeeding Congresses. He was renominated as a candidate for reelection to the Fifty-second Congress, but declined to accept the nomination, retiring from public life and active business pursuits.

While still a congressman, Bayne became the first editor and publisher of The Evening Penny Press, a newspaper later known as The Pittsburgh Press.

== Suicide ==
As a result of concerns about a lung hemorrhage, he shot himself dead, two days after his 58th birthday, in Washington, D.C. in 1894. He was interred in Union Dale Cemetery, Pittsburgh, Pennsylvania.

U.S. House of Representatives
Preceded by Alexander G. Cochran	Member of the U.S. House of Representatives from Pennsylvania's 23rd congressional district 1877–1891	Succeeded by William A. Stone
