= Morgan Rawls =

American politician

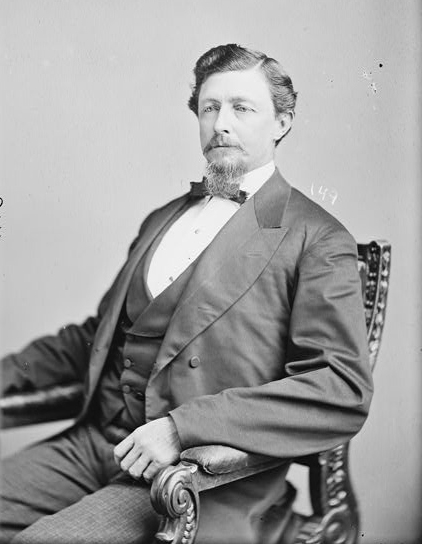

Member of the U.S. House of Representatives from Georgia's 1st district
- In office March 4, 1873 – March 24, 1874
- Preceded by: Archibald T. MacIntyre
- Succeeded by: Andrew Sloan

Member of the Georgia House of Representatives
- In office 1863–1865; 1868–1872; 1886–1889; 1896–1904

Personal details
- Born: June 29, 1829 Statesboro, Georgia
- Died: October 18, 1906 (aged 77) Guyton, Georgia
- Party: Democratic

Morgan Rawls (June 29, 1829 – October 18, 1906) was an American politician and lawyer, as well as an officer in the Confederate States Army during the American Civil War.

== Biography ==
Rawls was born near Statesboro, Georgia in 1829 and moved to Guyton, Georgia in 1856. During the American Civil War, he joined the Confederate States Army as an infantry captain and was eventually promoted to colonel in the 54th Regiment of the Georgia Infantry.

After the war, Rawls was a delegate to the State constitutional convention in 1865. He also served multiple terms in the Georgia House of Representatives (from 1863–1865, 1868–1872, 1886–1889 and 1896–1904). In 1872, Rawls was elected as a Democrat to represent Georgia's 1st congressional district in the U.S. House of Representatives during the 43rd Congress; however, he only served from March 4, 1873, until March 24, 1874. Republican Andrew Sloan was successful in contesting Rawls' election and served the remainder of the term in the 43rd Congress.

Rawls served in the office of the Clerk of the United States House of Representatives from 1874 to 1882 and 1891 to 1895. He died in Guyton on October 18, 1906, and was buried in Guyton Cemetery.

U.S. House of Representatives
Preceded by Archibald T. MacIntyre	Member of the U.S. House of Representatives from Georgia's 1st congressional district March 4, 1873 – March 24, 1874	Succeeded by Andrew Sloan
