= Darwin Phelps =

American politician

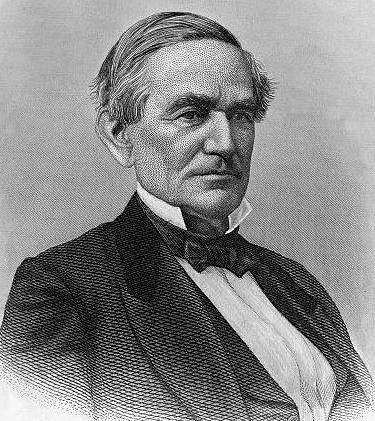
- Republican member of the U.S. House of Representatives

Member of the U.S. House of Representatives from Pennsylvania's 23rd district
- In office March 4, 1869 – March 3, 1871
- Preceded by: Thomas Williams
- Succeeded by: Ebenezer McJunkin

Personal details
- Born: April 17, 1807 East Granby, Connecticut, U.S.
- Died: December 14, 1879 (aged 60) Kittanning, Pennsylvania, U.S.
- Party: Republican
- Education: Western University

Darwin Phelps (April 17, 1807 – December 14, 1879) was a Republican member of the U.S. House of Representatives from Pennsylvania.

== Biography ==
Darwin Phelps was born in East Granby, Connecticut. He was left an orphan at an early age and went to live with his grandparents in Portage, Ohio, where he completed preparatory studies. He attended Western University in Pittsburgh, Pennsylvania.

He studied law in Pittsburgh, was admitted to the bar and commenced practice in Kittanning, Pennsylvania, in 1835. He was a member of the board of trustees of Kittanning Academy, a member of the town council in 1841 and 1848, and burgess in 1844, 1845, 1849, 1852, 1855, 1858, 1859, and 1861. He was an unsuccessful Republican candidate for auditor general in 1856. He was a delegate to the 1860 Republican National Convention.

Phelps served as major of the Twenty-second Regiment, Pennsylvania Volunteer Militia, in 1862. He was member of the Pennsylvania State House of Representatives in 1865.

Phelps was elected as a Republican to the Forty-first Congress. He was not a candidate for renomination in 1870. He died in Kittanning in 1879. Interment in Kittanning Cemetery.

U.S. House of Representatives
Preceded by Thomas Williams	Member of the U.S. House of Representatives from Pennsylvania's 23rd congressional district 1869–1871	Succeeded by Ebenezer McJunkin
