= Alvah Crocker =

American politician

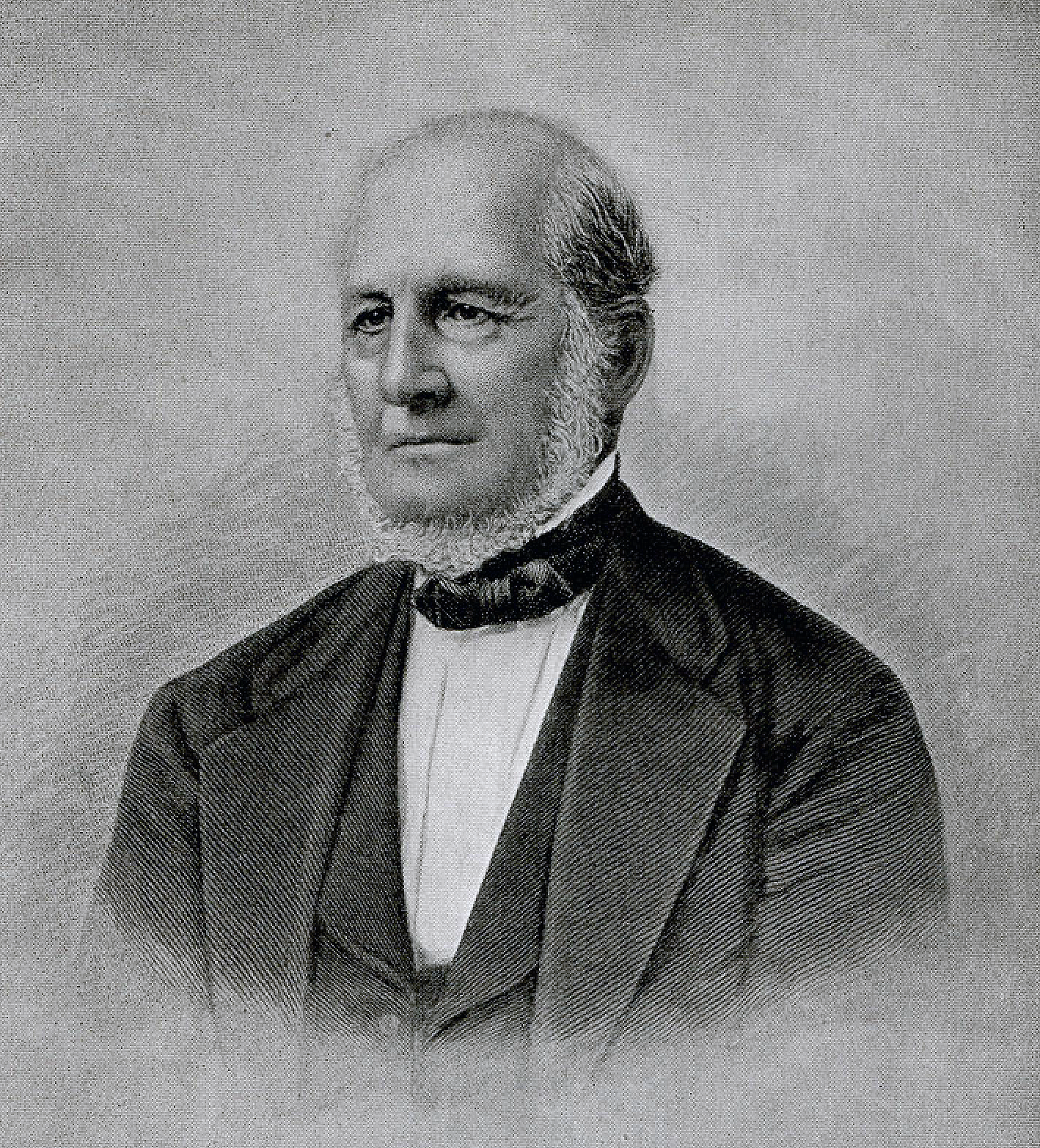

Member of the U.S. House of Representatives from Massachusetts
- In office January 2, 1872 – December 26, 1874
- Preceded by: William B. Washburn
- Succeeded by: Charles A. Stevens
- Constituency: 9th district (1872–73); 10th district (1873–74)

Massachusetts State Senate
- In office 1862–1864

Massachusetts House of Representatives
- In office 1842–1843

Massachusetts House of Representatives
- In office 1835–1836

Personal details
- Born: October 14, 1801 Leominster, Massachusetts
- Died: December 26, 1874 (aged 73) Fitchburg, Massachusetts
- Resting place: Laurel Hill Cemetery
- Party: Whig, Republican
- Children: Charles Thomas Crocker
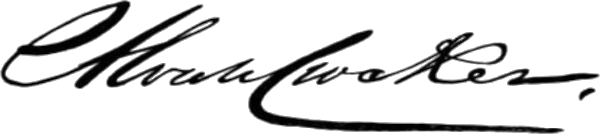
- Signature

Alvah Crocker (October 14, 1801 – December 26, 1874) was an American manufacturer and railroad promoter. He served in the Massachusetts General Court and was a U.S. representative from Massachusetts.

== Biography ==
Born in Leominster, Massachusetts, Crocker attended the public schools and Groton Academy. He was first employed in a paper mill at Franklin, New Hampshire, in 1820. In 1823, he borrowed the money necessary to establish a paper mill at Fitchburg and served as proprietor of paper manufactures there. His paper mills became the largest in the United States and he built extensive machine shops and foundries in the neighborhood of his mills. In manufacturing white paper he was the first to use cotton waste and also the first to use palm leaf fibre in wall papers.

He was elected to the Massachusetts legislature in 1835, where he advocated steam communication with Boston. He returned to the legislature in 1842, and obtained a charter for a new railroad between northern Massachusetts and the seaboard, which was completed through his exertions in 1845. He afterward engaged in building the Vermont and Massachusetts, the Troy and Boston, and the Hoosac Tunnel railroads, and in 1847/8 lectured in behalf of the tunnel project. The Science Channel documentary Driven to Invent: Killer Tunnel called Crocker "The Father of Modern Tunneling" for his influence in advancing the use of geologists, explosives, pneumatic tools, boring technology, and said, "He laid down the rules for tunnel construction even to the present day."

He served as president of the Fitchburg Railroad. During the American Civil War, he was a member of the Massachusetts State Senate for two terms.

Crocker was elected as a Republican to the Forty-second Congress to fill the vacancy caused by the resignation of William B. Washburn (who was elected Governor). He was reelected to the Forty-third Congress. He served in Congress from January 2, 1872, until his death in Fitchburg, Massachusetts, on December 26, 1874. He was interred in Laurel Hill Cemetery.

== See also ==
- List of members of the United States Congress who died in office (1790–1899)

== Future reading ==
- Wheelwright, William Bond, Life and Times of Alvah Crocker 1923, Reprint, New York: Arno Press, 1981.

U.S. House of Representatives
Preceded by William B. Washburn	Member of the U.S. House of Representatives from Massachusetts's 9th congressional district January 2, 1872 – March 3, 1873	Succeeded by George F. Hoar
Preceded by Henry L. Dawes	Member of the U.S. House of Representatives from Massachusetts's 10th congressional district March 4, 1873 – December 31, 1874	Succeeded by Charles A. Stevens
