= Battery B, 1st Ohio Light Artillery =

- Active: October 8, 1861 to July 22, 1865
- Country: United States
- Allegiance: Union
- Branch: Artillery
- Engagements: Battle of Wildcat Mountain; Battle of Mill Springs; First Battle of Chattanooga; Battle of Perryville; Battle of Stones River; Tullahoma Campaign; Battle of Chickamauga; Siege of Chattanooga; Battle of Missionary Ridge

Battery B, 1st Ohio Light Artillery was an artillery battery that served in the Union Army during the American Civil War. The battery was often referred to as Standart's Battery or Standart's Ohio Battery.

== Service ==
The battery was organized Camp Dennison near Cincinnati, Ohio and mustered in for a three-year enlistment on October 8, 1861. The regiment was organized as early as 1860 under Ohio's militia laws, under Colonel James Barnett. This battery was recruited in northeast Ohio.

The battery was attached to 1st Division, Army of the Ohio, to March 1862. 7th Independent Brigade, Army of the Ohio, to July 1862. Artillery, 4th Division, Army of the Ohio, to September 1862. Artillery, 4th Division, II Corps, Army of the Ohio, to November 1862. Artillery, 2nd Division, Left Wing, XIV Corps, Army of the Cumberland, to January 1863. Artillery, 2nd Division, XXI Corps, Army of the Cumberland, to October 1863. 1st Division, Artillery Reserve, Department of the Cumberland, to March 1864. Artillery, 2nd Division, XII Corps, Army of the Cumberland, to April 1864. Garrison Artillery, Bridgeport, Alabama, Department of the Cumberland, to July 1865.

Battery B, 1st Ohio Light Artillery mustered out of service on July 22, 1865.

== Detailed service ==
Ordered to Camp Dick Robinson, Ky.. Action at Rockcastle Hills or Camp Wildcat, Ky., October 21, 1861. Duty at Fishing Creek November 5, 1861 to January 17, 1862. Action at Logan's Cross Roads, Ky., January 19. Battle of Mill Springs January 20. At Somerset, Ky., until February 10. Movement to Nashville, Tenn., February 10-March 4. Expedition to Rodgersville May 13–14. Lambs Ferry, Ala., May 14. Action at Chattanooga June 7. Engaged by sections in expeditions through middle Tennessee until July 10. Moved to Murfreesboro, Tenn., July 18. March in pursuit of Bragg to Louisville, Ky., September 3–22. Pursuit of Bragg into Kentucky October 1–10. Battle of Perryville, Ky, October 8 (reserve). Pursuit of Bragg to London October 10–22. Wild Cat October 17. Nelson's Cross Roads October 18. March to Nashville, Tenn., October 22-November 7, and duty there until December 26. Advance on Murfreesboro, Tenn., December 26–30. Lavergne December 26–27. Battle of Stones River December 30–31, 1862 and January 1–3, 1863. Outpost duty at Cripple Creek January 7 to June 24. Expedition to Woodbury April 2. Tullahoma Campaign June 24-July 7. Occupation of middle Tennessee until August 16. Passage of Cumberland Mountains and Tennessee River and Chickamauga Campaign August 16-September 22. Lee and Gordon's Mills September 11–13. Battle of Chickamauga September 19–21. Siege of Chattanooga, September 24-November 23. Chattanooga-Ringgold Campaign November 23–27. Battles of Missionary Ridge November 24–25. Moved to Nashville, Tenn., December 4, and duty there until March 1864. Moved to Bridgeport, Ala., March 26, and garrison duty there until July 1865. Elrod's Tan Yard January 27, 1865 (detachment).

== Casualties ==
The battery lost a total of 40 men during service; 11 enlisted men killed or mortally wounded, 1 officer and 28 enlisted men died of disease.

== Commanders ==
- Captain William E. Standart
- Lieutenant Norman A. Baldwin - commanded at the Battle of Chickamauga

== Notable members ==
- 1st Lieutenant J. Hale Sypher - U.S. Representative from Louisiana, 1867-1875

== See also ==
- List of Ohio Civil War units
- Ohio in the Civil War
