= John McCandless Thompson =

American politician

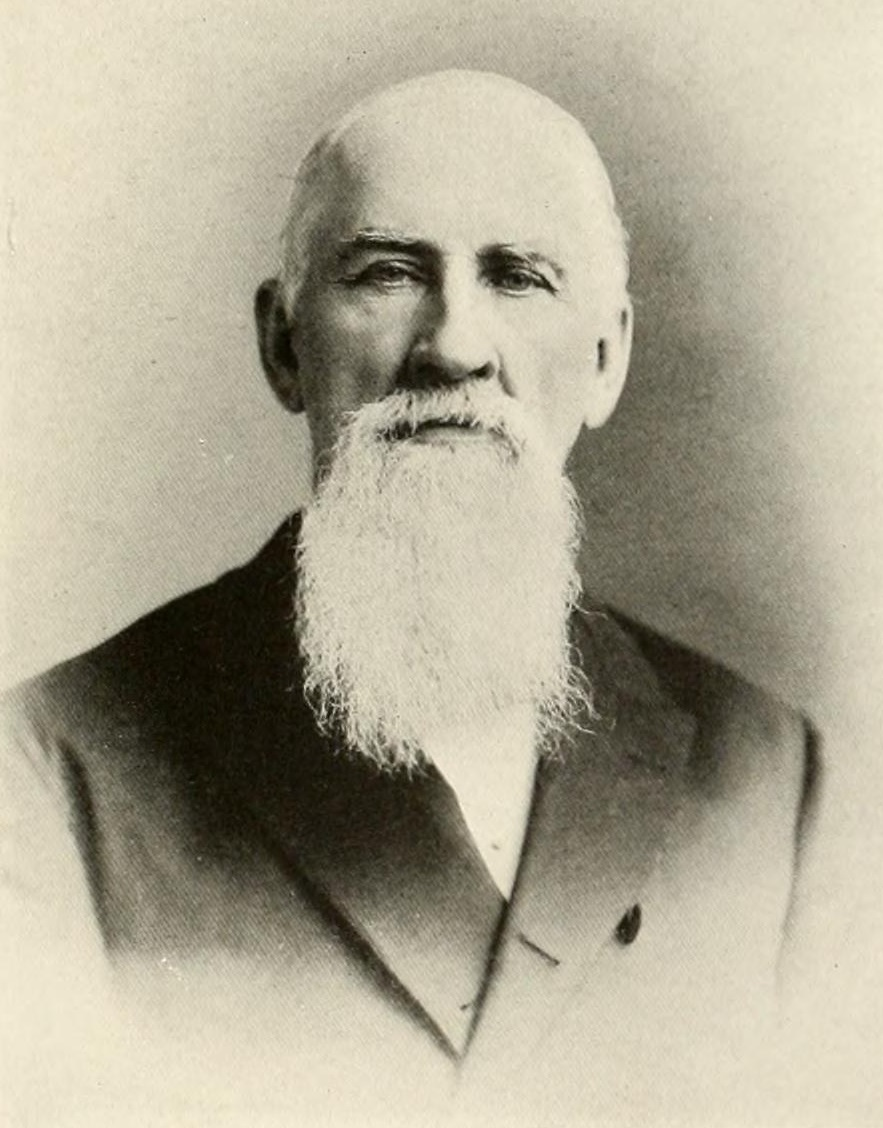
- From Volume 1 of 1903's The Twentieth Century Bench and Bar of Pennsylvania

Member of the U.S. House of Representatives from Pennsylvania's 23rd district
- In office January 5, 1875 – March 3, 1875
- Preceded by: Ebenezer McJunkin
- Succeeded by: Alexander Gilmore Cochran

Member of the U.S. House of Representatives from Pennsylvania's 26th district
- In office March 4, 1877 – March 3, 1879
- Preceded by: James Sheakley
- Succeeded by: Samuel Bernard Dick

John McCandless Thompson (January 4, 1829 – September 3, 1903) was a Republican member of the U.S. House of Representatives from Pennsylvania.

Thompson (brother of William George Thompson) was born near Butler, Pennsylvania. He attended the common schools and Witherspoon Institute. He studied law, was admitted to the bar in 1854 and began practice in Butler. He was a member of the Pennsylvania State House of Representatives in 1859 and 1860, and served one year as speaker. He entered the Union Army during the American Civil War and served as major and subsequently as lieutenant colonel of the One Hundred and Thirty-fourth Regiment, Pennsylvania Volunteer Infantry. He was a delegate to the 1868 Republican National Convention.

Thompson was elected as a Republican to the Forty-third Congress to fill the vacancy caused by the resignation of Ebenezer McJunkin. He elected to the Forty-fifth Congress. He was not a candidate for renomination in 1878. He resumed the practice of his profession and died in Butler in 1903. Interment in Butler Cemetery.

U.S. House of Representatives
Preceded by Ebenezer McJunkin	Member of the U.S. House of Representatives from Pennsylvania's 23rd congressional district January 5, 1875 – March 3, 1875	Succeeded by Alexander Gilmore Cochran
Preceded by James Sheakley	Member of the U.S. House of Representatives from Pennsylvania's 26th congressional district March 4, 1877 – March 3, 1879	Succeeded by Samuel Bernard Dick
