= Alexander G. Cochran =

American politician

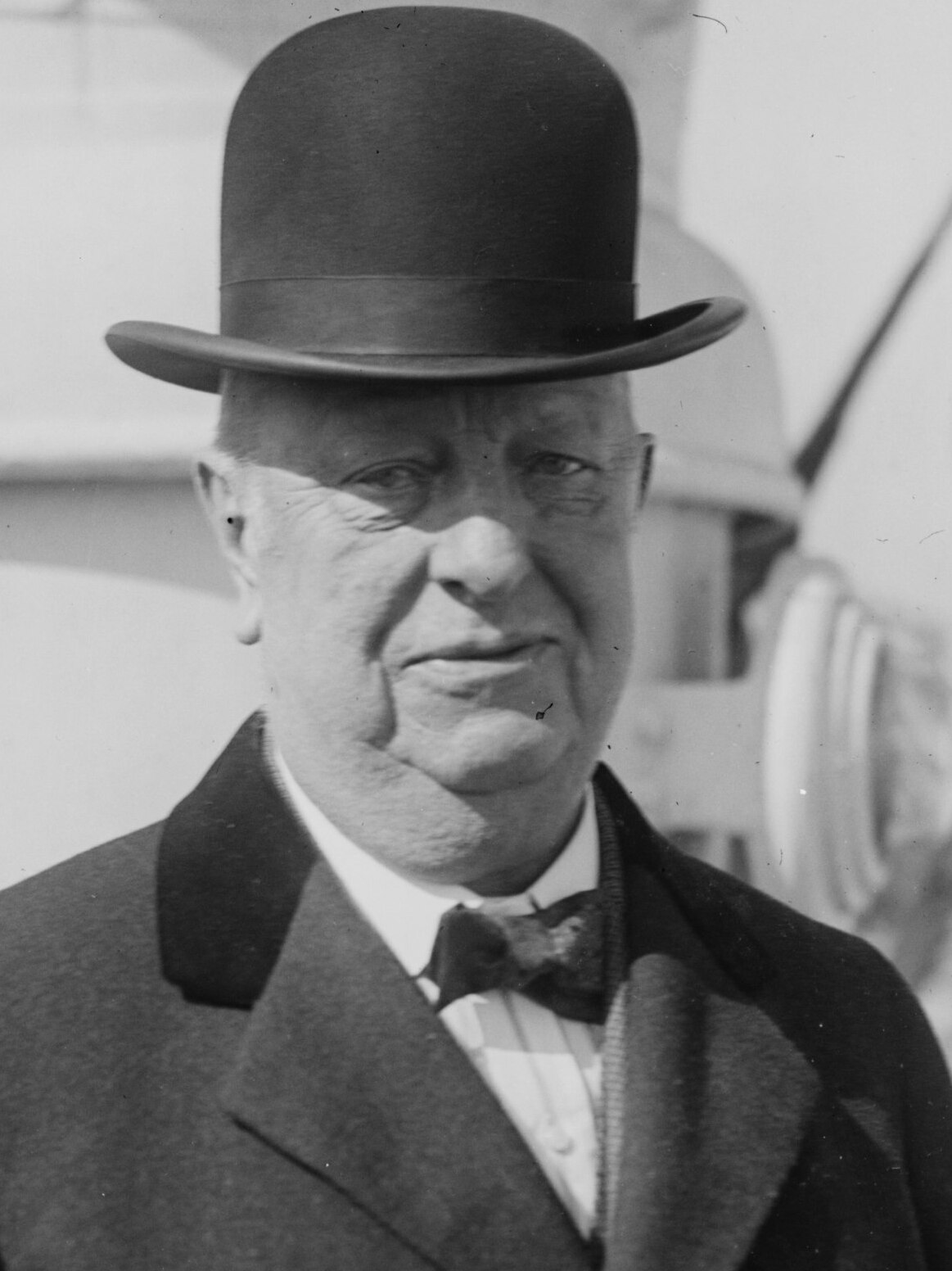

Member of the U.S. House of Representatives from Pennsylvania's 23rd district
- In office March 4, 1875 – March 3, 1877
- Preceded by: John McCandless Thompson
- Succeeded by: Thomas McKee Bayne

Personal details
- Born: Alexander Gilmore Cochran; March 20, 1846 Allegheny City, Pennsylvania, U.S.
- Died: May 1, 1928 (aged 82)
- Party: Democratic

Alexander Gilmore Cochran (March 20, 1846 – May 1, 1928) was an American attorney and one-term Democratic member of the U.S. House of Representatives from Pennsylvania.

== Early life ==
Cochran was born in Allegheny City, Pennsylvania (now part of Pittsburgh). He attended private and public schools in Pennsylvania, Phillips Academy in Andover, Massachusetts, and Columbia Law School in New York City. Cochran was admitted to the bar in 1866 and commenced practice in Pittsburgh.

== Career ==
Cochran was elected as a Democrat to the Forty-fourth Congress. He was an unsuccessful candidate for reelection in 1876 and so resumed the practice of law in Pittsburgh. In 1879 he moved to St. Louis, Missouri where he spent more than twenty years as general solicitor for the Missouri Pacific Railway Company and head of its legal department in the West. He also served as vice president of the Missouri Pacific and Iron Mountain Railway and as judge advocate with the rank of lieutenant colonel in the Missouri National Guard. Cochran died in St. Louis in 1928 and was interred in Bellefontaine Cemetery.

== Sources ==
- United States Congress. "Alexander G. Cochran (id: C000561)". Biographical Directory of the United States Congress.
- The Political Graveyard

U.S. House of Representatives
Preceded by John M. Thompson	Member of the U.S. House of Representatives from Pennsylvania's 23rd congressional district 1875–1877	Succeeded by Thomas M. Bayne
