= Ebenezer McJunkin =

American politician

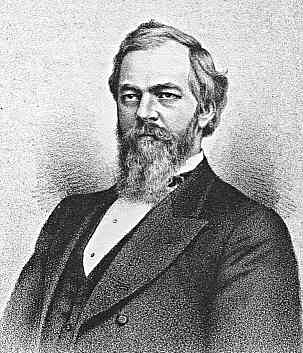
- McJunkin in 1883

Member of the U.S. House of Representatives from Pennsylvania's 23rd district
- In office March 4, 1871 – January 1, 1875
- Preceded by: Darwin Phelps
- Succeeded by: John M. Thompson

Personal details
- Born: March 28, 1819 Center Township, Pennsylvania, U.S.
- Died: November 10, 1907 (aged 88) Butler, Pennsylvania, U.S.
- Party: Republican
- Education: Jefferson College
- Occupation: Attorney, judge

Ebenezer McJunkin (March 28, 1819 – November 10, 1907) was a Republican member of the U.S. House of Representatives from Pennsylvania.

== Biography ==
Ebenezer McJunkin was born at Center Top, in Butler County, Pennsylvania on March 28, 1819. He graduated from Jefferson College (now Washington & Jefferson College) in Canonsburg, Pennsylvania in 1841.

He studied law, was admitted to the bar in 1843, and commenced practice in Butler, Pennsylvania.

He subsequently served as deputy attorney general for Butler County, Pennsylvania in 1850, and was a delegate to the 1860 Republican National Convention. During the American Civil War, he served as a first lieutenant of a militia unit.

McJunkin was elected as a Republican to the Forty-second and Forty-third Congresses. He served as chairman of the United States House Committee on Expenditures in the Department of the Navy during the Forty-third Congress.

He resigned January 1, 1875 in order to serve as president judge of the seventeenth judicial district of Pennsylvania from 1875 to 1885. He then resumed the practice of his profession until 1900, when he retired.

== Death and interment ==
He died in Butler, Pennsylvania on November 10, 1907, and was interred in North Cemetery.

U.S. House of Representatives
Preceded by Darwin Phelps	Member of the U.S. House of Representatives from Pennsylvania's 23rd congressional district 1871–1875	Succeeded by John M. Thompson
