= Samuel B. Dick =

American politician

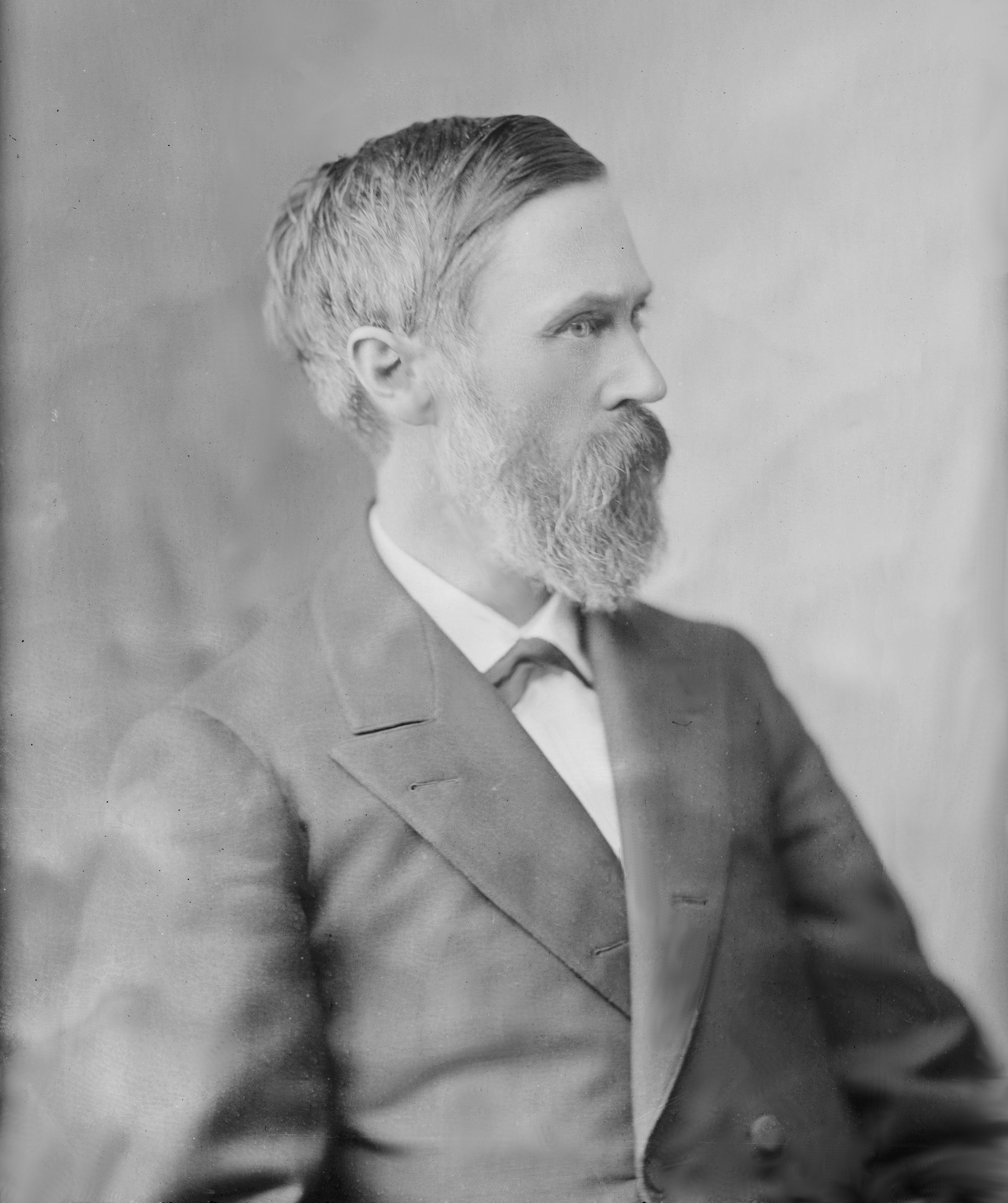

Member of the U.S. House of Representatives from Pennsylvania's 26th district
- In office March 4, 1879 – March 3, 1881
- Preceded by: John M. Thompson
- Succeeded by: Samuel H. Miller

Personal details
- Born: October 26, 1836 Meadville, Pennsylvania, U.S.
- Died: May 10, 1907 (aged 70) Meadville, Pennsylvania, U.S.
- Party: Republican
- Education: Allegheny College

Samuel Bernard Dick (October 26, 1836 – May 10, 1907) was an American politician who served as a Republican member of the U.S. House of Representatives from Pennsylvania from 1879 to 1881.

== Biography ==
Samuel B. Dick (son of John Dick) was born in Meadville, Pennsylvania, where he attended the public schools and later Allegheny College. Before the Civil War, he was engaged in banking.

During the war, Dick served as captain of Company F, 9th Pennsylvania Reserve Regiment. He was severely wounded at the Battle of Dranesville, on December 20, 1861, and commanded the regiment at the Battle of Antietam. He subsequently served as colonel of the regiment until February 1863, when he resigned. He then commanded the Fifth Regiment, Pennsylvania Militia, and proceeded to New Creek, West Virginia, in July 1863.

He served as mayor of Meadville in 1870, and was an unsuccessful candidate for the House in 1870 and 1876. Dick was elected as a Republican to the Forty-sixth Congress. He was not a candidate for reelection in 1880. (Local custom required a candidate from another county.) He was a delegate at the 1900 Republican National Convention and an alternate in 1904. He served as president of the Pittsburgh, Bessemer & Lake Erie Railroad Company until April 1900. He was also president of Phoenix Iron Works Co.

Dick was a freemason and served as grand master of the Grand Lodge of Pennsylvania from 1881 to 1882.

He died in Meadville in 1907 and was interred at Greendale Cemetery.

U.S. House of Representatives
Preceded by John M. Thompson	Member of the U.S. House of Representatives from Pennsylvania's 26th congressional district 1879–1881	Succeeded by Samuel H. Miller
