= Joseph W. Clift =

American politician

Joseph Clift
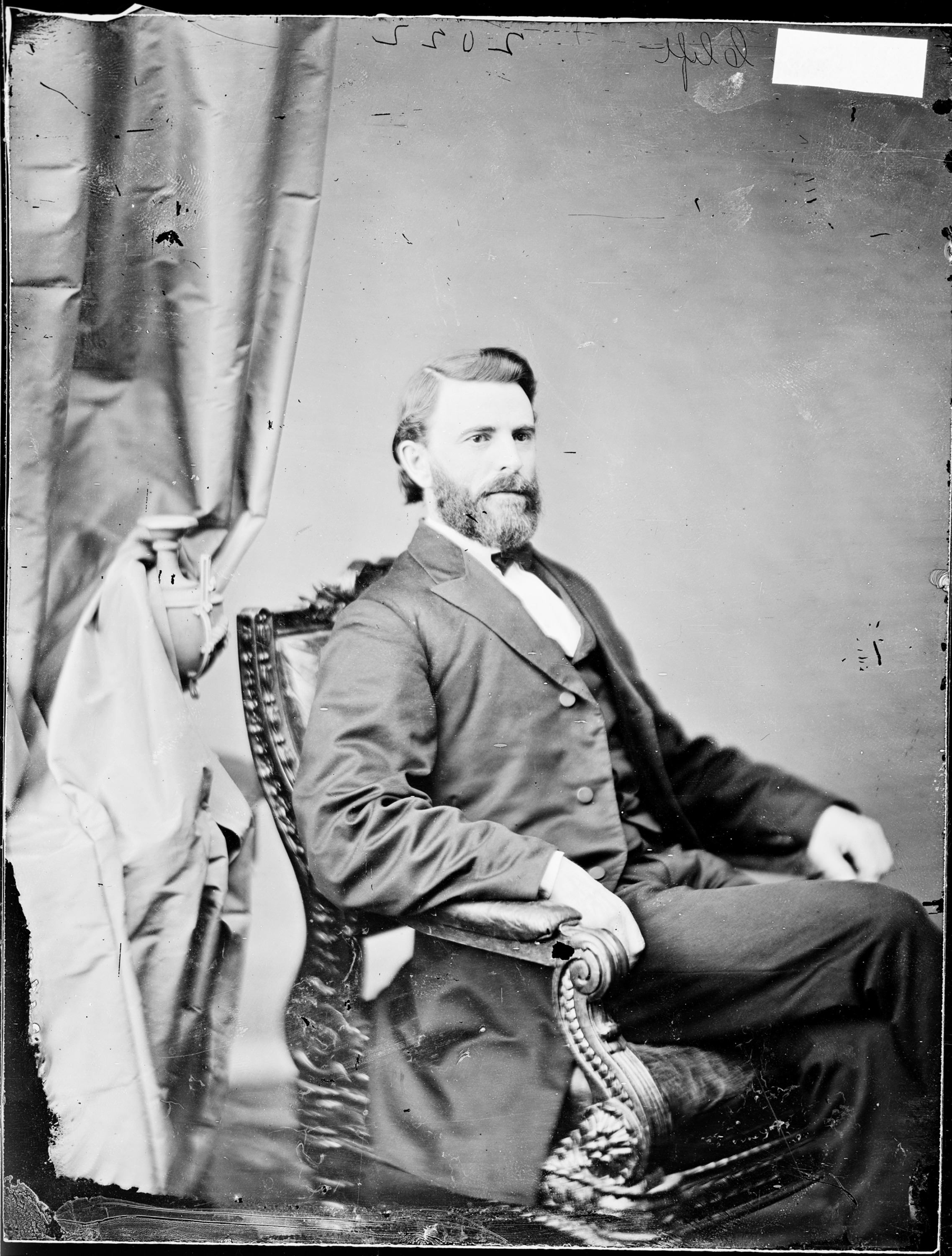

Member of the U.S. House of Representatives from Georgia's 1st district
- In office July 25, 1868 – March 3, 1869
- Preceded by: Peter Early Love
- Succeeded by: William W. Paine

Personal details
- Born: September 30, 1837 North Marshfield, Massachusetts, US
- Died: May 2, 1908 (aged 70) Rock City Falls, New York, US
- Party: Republican
- Profession: Surgeon, Politician

Military service
- Allegiance: United States
- Branch/service: United States Army (Union Army)
- Unit: Army of the Potomac
- Battles/wars: American Civil War

Joseph Wales Clift (September 30, 1837 – May 2, 1908) was a U.S. Representative from Georgia representing Georgia's 1st congressional district from 1868 to 1869 upon Georgia's re-admittance to the United States after the American Civil War.

== Early life and education ==
Born in North Marshfield, Massachusetts, Clift attended the common schools and Phillips Academy, Andover, Massachusetts. He graduated from the medical school of Harvard University in 1862.

== Career ==
=== Military career ===
Clift entered the Union Army and was acting surgeon from July 13, 1862, to August 7, 1865. He served until November 18, 1866.

=== Registrar of Savannah ===
After the war, Clift practiced medicine in Savannah, Georgia and was soon appointed registrar of the city of Savannah by Major General Pope under the reconstruction acts.

=== U.S. House of Representatives ===
Upon the readmission of Georgia to the United States, Clift was elected as a Republican to the 40th United States Congress and served from July 25, 1868, to March 3, 1869. Clift presented credentials as a Member-elect to the 41st United States Congress, but was not permitted to qualify.

== Later life and death ==
After being declined his seat after re-election, Clift moved back to Massachusetts and continued to practice medicine. Clift died in Rock City Falls, New York, May 2, 1908.

U.S. House of Representatives
Preceded by Vacant	Member of the U.S. House of Representatives from Georgia's 1st congressional district July 25, 1868 – March 3, 1869	Succeeded by Vacant
