= Archibald T. MacIntyre =

American politician

Archibald Thompson MacIntyre
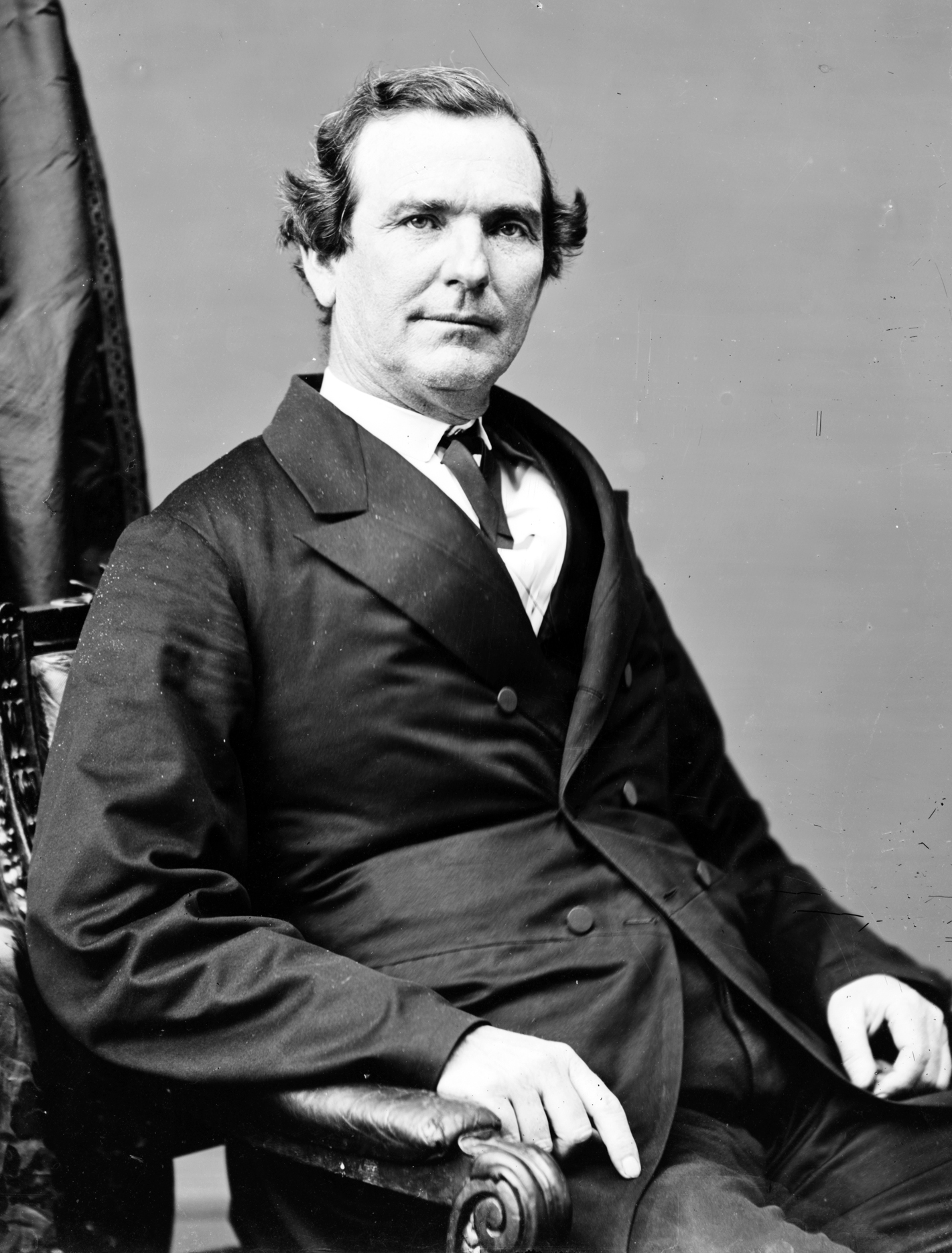

Member of the U.S. House of Representatives from Georgia's 1st district
- In office March 4, 1871 – March 3, 1873
- Preceded by: William W. Paine
- Succeeded by: Morgan Rawls

Personal details
- Born: October 27, 1822 Marion, Georgia
- Died: January 1, 1900 (aged 77) Thomasville, Georgia
- Citizenship: United States
- Party: Democratic
- Profession: Attorney

Military service
- Allegiance: Confederate States of America
- Branch/service: Confederate States Army
- Rank: Colonel
- Unit: Eleventh Infantry, Georgia Guards
- Battles/wars: American Civil War

Archibald Thompson MacIntyre (October 27, 1822 – January 1, 1900) was an American politician and lawyer, as well as an officer in the Confederate States Army during the American Civil War.

== Biography ==
MacIntyre was born near Marion, Georgia, in 1822 and moved to Thomas County, Georgia, in 1826. He studied law in Monticello, Florida, and Macon, Georgia, before gaining admittance to the Georgia state bar in 1843 and becoming a practicing attorney in Thomasville, Georgia.

In 1849, MacIntyre was elected to the Georgia House of Representatives. He served as a Confederate States Army colonel in the Eleventh Infantry of the Georgia Guards during the Civil War. After the war, he was a delegate to the State constitutional convention in 1865. MacIntyre was elected in 1870 as a Democrat to the U.S. House of Representatives to the 42nd Congress. He served one term from March 4, 1871, until March 3, 1873, and did not run for reelection in 1872

After his congressional service, MacIntyre continued practicing law in Thomasville. He also served on the board of trustees of the University of Georgia in Athens and the Georgia State Sanitarium. He died in Thomasville on January 1, 1900, and was buried in that city's Laurel Hill Cemetery.

U.S. House of Representatives
Preceded by William W. Paine	Member of the U.S. House of Representatives from Georgia's 1st congressional district March 4, 1871 – March 3, 1873	Succeeded by Morgan Rawls
