= Rhode Island Department of Corrections =

Government agency in Rhode Island, United States

Rhode Island Department of Corrections (RIDOC)

Agency overview
- Formed: 1972
- Jurisdiction: Rhode Island Adult Correctional Institutions (ACI), Probation, and Parole
- Headquarters: Cranston, Rhode Island
- Annual budget: $206,976,839
- Agency executive: Wayne Salisbury, Director
- Website: http://www.doc.ri.gov

The Rhode Island Department of Corrections (RIDOC) is a government agency of the U.S. state of Rhode Island, responsible for operating state prisons. Its headquarters are located in Cranston.

The Adult Correctional Institutions (ACI) consist of seven prison buildings situated on the RIDOC grounds in Cranston. This includes five facilities for men and two for women, with an operational capacity of 3,854 inmates.

As of 2020, Rhode Island has one federal prison in Central Falls. The following list excludes any municipal jails.

== Facilities ==
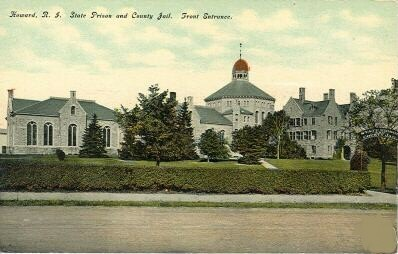
Rhode Island's "Howard Prison" in Cranston, Rhode Island, at the turn of the 20th century

=== Males ===
Maximum Security
- Anthony P. Travisono Intake Service Center
- High Security Center (inmate capacity 138)
- Rhode Island Maximum Security Prison
Medium Security
- John J. Moran Medium Security Facility
Minimum Security
- Minimum Security (inmate capacity 710)

=== Females ===
- Gloria McDonald Maximum and Medium Security Facility (inmate capacity 173)

=== Closed ===
- Donald Price Medium Security Facility
- Dorothea Dix Minimum Security Facility / Bernadette Building (inmate capacity 150)

== See also ==
- List of law enforcement agencies in Rhode Island
- List of United States state correction agencies
- List of United States state prisons
- Prison
