= Andrew Sloan (politician) =

American politician (1845–1883)

Member of the U.S. House of Representatives from Georgia's 1st district
- In office March 24, 1874 – March 3, 1875
- Preceded by: Morgan Rawls
- Succeeded by: Julian Hartridge

Personal details
- Born: June 10, 1845 McDonough, Georgia, U.S.
- Died: September 22, 1883 (aged 38) Silver City, New Mexico, U.S.
- Resting place: City Cemetery
- Party: Republican
- Education: Bethany College
- Profession: Politician, lawyer

Andrew Sloan (June 10, 1845 – September 22, 1883) was a U.S. Representative from Georgia.

Born in McDonough, Henry County, Georgia, Sloan attended the common schools, Marshall College in Griffin, Georgia, and Bethany College in Bethany, West Virginia. He studied law, was admitted to the bar in 1866 and practiced. He served as solicitor of Henry County in 1866. He moved to Savannah, Georgia, where he served as deputy collector of customs in 1867. He resigned, and resumed the practice of law. He served as assistant United States Attorney in 1869. He was later appointed district attorney and served until 1872, when he resigned, acting at the same time as local counsel for the United States in regard to the cotton claims and also with the mixed commission on British and American claims. He successfully contested as a Republican the election of Morgan Rawls to the Forty-third Congress and served from March 24, 1874, to March 3, 1875. He moved to New Mexico in 1881 and settled in Silver City, where he died September 22, 1883. He was interred in the City Cemetery.

U.S. House of Representatives
Preceded by Morgan Rawls	Member of the U.S. House of Representatives from Georgia's 1st congressional district March 24, 1874 – March 3, 1875	Succeeded by Julian Hartridge
