= Effingham Lawrence =

American politician (1820–1878)

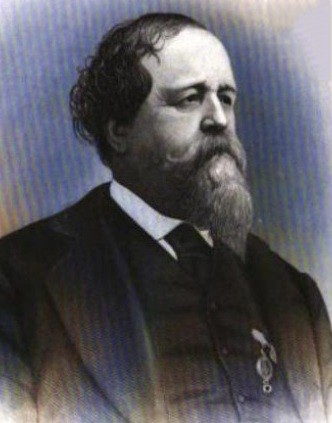
- From Volume II of 1875's "The American Government"

Member of the U.S. House of Representatives from Louisiana's 1st district
- In office March 3, 1875 – March 4, 1875
- Preceded by: J. Hale Sypher
- Succeeded by: Randall L. Gibson

Member of the Louisiana House of Representatives from the 1st district
- In office 1871–1875

Personal details
- Born: March 2, 1820 Bayside, Queens, New York, U.S.
- Died: December 9, 1878 (aged 58) Plaquemines Parish, Louisiana, U.S.
- Party: Democratic
- Spouse: Mary Ann George
- Children: 10
- Profession: Sugar planter

Effingham Lawrence (March 2, 1820 – December 9, 1878) was an American politician known for serving for the shortest term in congressional history, serving—along with George A. Sheridan—for just one day in the U.S. House of Representatives.

== Biography ==
Lawrence was born in Bayside, Queens, New York, in 1820. He was a descendant of John Lawrence and John Bowne, both Quakers and pioneer English settlers of Queens, NY.

Lawrence moved to Louisiana in 1843 and engaged in the planting and refining of sugar. He served in the Louisiana State House of Representatives for some time and then successfully contested the re-election of Jacob Hale Sypher. Lawrence then served for one day in Congress but was not reelected. He died at Magnolia Plantation, Plaquemines Parish, Louisiana in 1878.

== Contested election ==
The voting in the 1872 election was characterized by a number of irregularities, with Sypher initially being declared the winner and returned to Congress while Lawrence appealed the election results. Lawrence's belated replacement of Sypher, after courts intervened to nullify the original results and instead deliver the seat to Lawrence, marked the first time since the Civil War that a Democrat had defeated a Republican for a seat in Congress from Louisiana.

The 1874 voting in which Lawrence failed "re-election" to the seat had already been held before he was seated for the term to which he had, by the later court order, been elected in 1872. Thus, under the congressional calendar in effect at the time, Lawrence was able to serve for one day of the 1873–1875 term to which he had, in the end, been elected. On the following day—March 4, 1875—he was succeeded by Randall Lee Gibson, a Democrat who had defeated him during the preceding autumn.

== See also ==
- Cornelius Lawrence, his cousin
- Thomas Johnson, shortest-serving U.S. Supreme Court justice
- William Henry Harrison, shortest-serving president of the United States.

U.S. House of Representatives
Preceded by Jacob Hale Sypher	United States Representative for the 1st Congressional District of Louisiana; 1875	Succeeded by Randall Lee Gibson
