= Anthony P. Travisono Intake Service Center =

Prison in Rhode Island, United States

Coordinates: 41°44′55″N 71°27′50″W

- Interactive map of Anthony P. Travisono Intake Service Center
- Location: Cranston, Rhode Island
- Status: Open
- Security class: Maximum
- Capacity: 1118
- Opened: 1985 / renovated 1995
- Managed by: Rhode Island Department of Corrections

The Anthony P. Travisono Intake Service Center is a maximum-security state men's prison in Cranston, Rhode Island, owned and operated by the Rhode Island Department of Corrections. The facility opened in 1985, and has an operational capacity of 1118 prisoners.
