= John J. Moran Medium Security Facility =

Prison in Rhode Island, United States

Coordinates: 41°44′42″N 71°27′57″W

- Interactive map of John J. Moran Medium Security Facility
- Location: Cranston, Rhode Island
- Status: open
- Security class: medium
- Capacity: 1006
- Opened: 1992
- Managed by: Rhode Island Department of Corrections

The John J. Moran Medium Security Facility is a medium-security state men's prison in Cranston, Rhode Island, owned and operated by the Rhode Island Department of Corrections. The facility opened in 1992, and has an operational capacity of 1006 prisoners.
