= Clinton L. Cobb =

American politician

Clinton Cobb
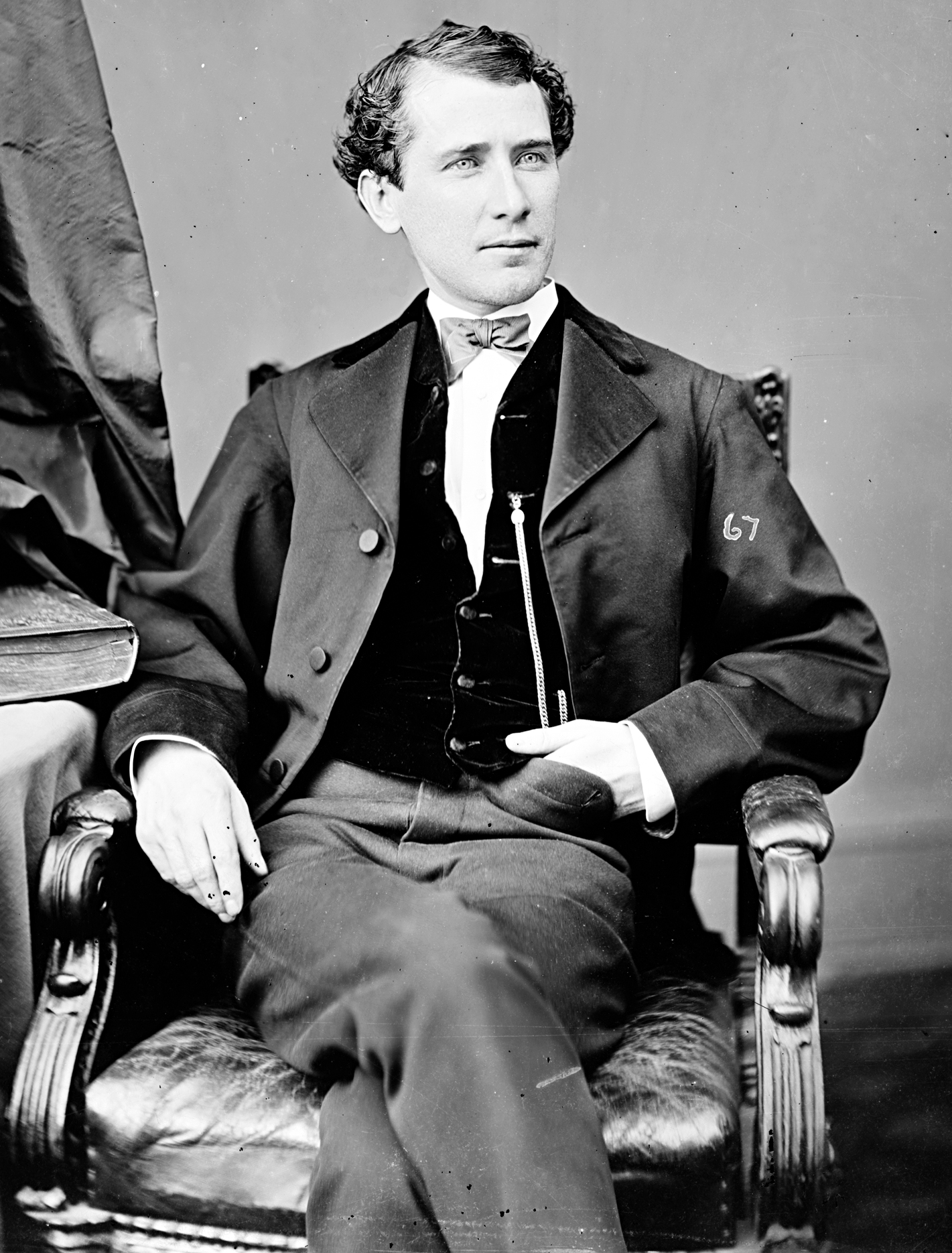

Member of the U.S. House of Representatives from North Carolina's 1st district
- In office March 4, 1869 – March 3, 1875
- Preceded by: John R. French
- Succeeded by: Jesse J. Yeates

Personal details
- Born: Clinton Levering Cobb; August 25, 1842 Elizabeth City, North Carolina
- Died: April 30, 1879 (aged 36) Elizabeth City, North Carolina
- Resting place: Episcopal Cemetery
- Education: University of North Carolina, Chapel Hill
- Occupation: attorney

Clinton Levering Cobb (August 25, 1842 – April 30, 1879) was an American lawyer, businessman, and politician who served three terms as a U.S. representative from North Carolina from 1869 to 1875.

== Biography ==
Born in Elizabeth City, North Carolina, Cobb attended the common schools and was graduated from the University of North Carolina at Chapel Hill. He studied law. He was admitted to the bar in 1867 and commenced practice in Elizabeth City. He engaged in the mercantile business.

=== Congress ===
Cobb was elected as a Republican to the Forty-first, Forty-second, and Forty-third Congresses (March 4, 1869 – March 3, 1875). He served as chairman of the Committee on the Freedman's Bureau (Forty-second and Forty-third Congresses). He was an unsuccessful candidate for reelection in 1874 to the Forty-fourth Congress.

=== Later career and death ===
He resumed the practice of law in Elizabeth City, and died there on April 30, 1879. He was interred in Episcopal Cemetery.

== Sources ==
- United States Congress. "Clinton L. Cobb (id: C000544)". Biographical Directory of the United States Congress.
- Media related to Clinton L. Cobb at Wikimedia Commons

U.S. House of Representatives
Preceded by John R. French	Member of the U.S. House of Representatives from North Carolina's 1st congressional district 1869–1875	Succeeded by Jesse J. Yeates
