= John R. French =

American politician

John Robert French
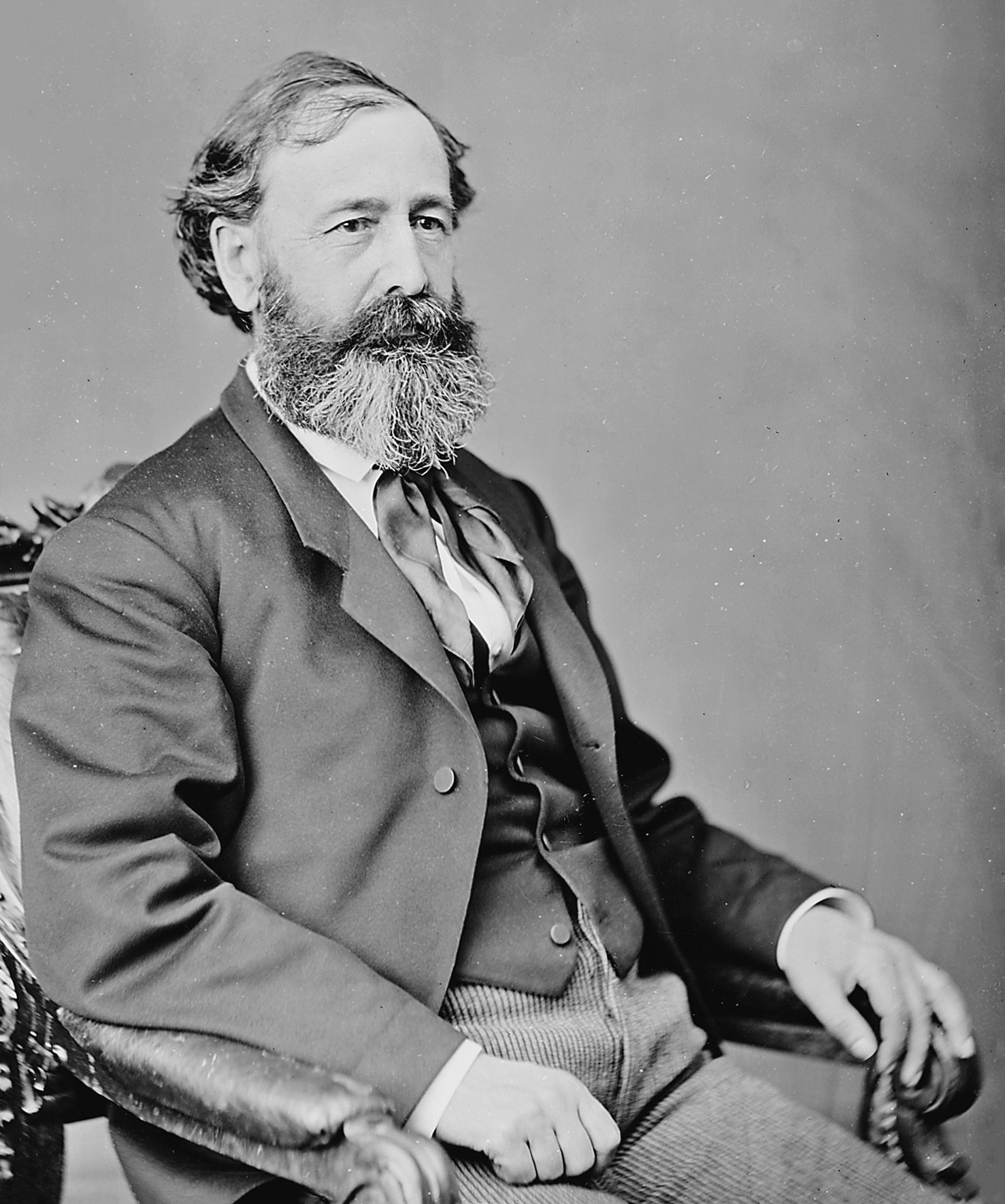

Sergeant at Arms of the United States Senate
- In office March 22, 1869 – March 24, 1879
- Preceded by: George T. Brown
- Succeeded by: Richard J. Bright

Member of the U.S. House of Representatives from North Carolina's 1st district
- In office July 6, 1868 – March 3, 1869
- Preceded by: Vacant
- Succeeded by: Clinton L. Cobb

Member of the Ohio House of Representatives
- In office 1858–1860

Personal details
- Born: May 28, 1819 Gilmanton, New Hampshire, US
- Died: October 2, 1890 (aged 71) Boise, Idaho, US
- Resting place: Boise City Cemetery, Boise City, Idaho
- Party: Republican
- Relations: Nathaniel Peabody Rogers
- Profession: Publisher; Editor; Politician

John Robert French (May 28, 1819 – October 2, 1890) was an American publisher, editor, and Republican politician. He served as a U.S. representative from North Carolina, as Sergeant at Arms of the United States Senate and as a member of the North Carolina House of Representatives during the 1860s.

== Early life and career ==
French was born in Gilmanton, New Hampshire and received an academic education in Gilmanton and Concord, New Hampshire. He learned the printer’s trade, and for five years worked as publisher and associate editor of the New Hampshire Statesman in Concord. In 1847, while at the New Hampshire Statesman, French published a volume of writings by Nathaniel Peabody Rogers titled, A Collection from the Newspaper Writings of Nathaniel Peabody Rogers. He was the publisher and associate editor of Herald of Freedom in Concord, one of the first anti-slavery newspapers.

He worked as editor of the Eastern Journal in Biddeford, Maine for two years. In 1854, French moved to Lake County, Ohio where he worked as editor of the Telegraph, the Press, and, in 1856, the Cleveland Morning Leader.

== Political career ==
In 1858 and 1859, French served as a member of the Ohio House of Representatives. In 1861, he was appointed by Secretary Salmon P. Chase to a clerkship in the Treasury Department in Washington, D.C.

French was appointed by President Abraham Lincoln as a member of the board of direct-tax commissioners for the State of North Carolina. He settled in Edenton, North Carolina at the close of the Civil War. In 1867, he served as a Delegate to the State constitutional convention.

Upon the readmission of the State of North Carolina to representation following the Civil War, French was elected as a Republican to the Fortieth Congress, serving from July 6, 1868 to March 3, 1869. He was not a candidate for renomination in 1868.

He was elected Sergeant at Arms of the United States Senate on March 22, 1869 and served in that capacity until March 24, 1879. French was appointed secretary and disbursing office of the Ute Commission in July 1880, whereupon he returned to Washington, D.C.

In his later years, French moved to Omaha, Nebraska, and then to Boise City, Idaho, where he was editor of the Boise City Sun until his death. He is interred in Boise City Cemetery.

== Personal life ==
French was Nathaniel Peabody Rogers's son in law.

U.S. House of Representatives
Preceded by William N. H. Smith (before Civil War hiatus)	Member of the U.S. House of Representatives from North Carolina's 5th congressional district 1868–1869	Succeeded by Clinton L. Cobb
Political offices
Preceded by George T. Brown	Sergeant at Arms of the United States Senate; 1869–1879	Succeeded by Richard J. Bright
