= J. Hale Sypher =

American politician

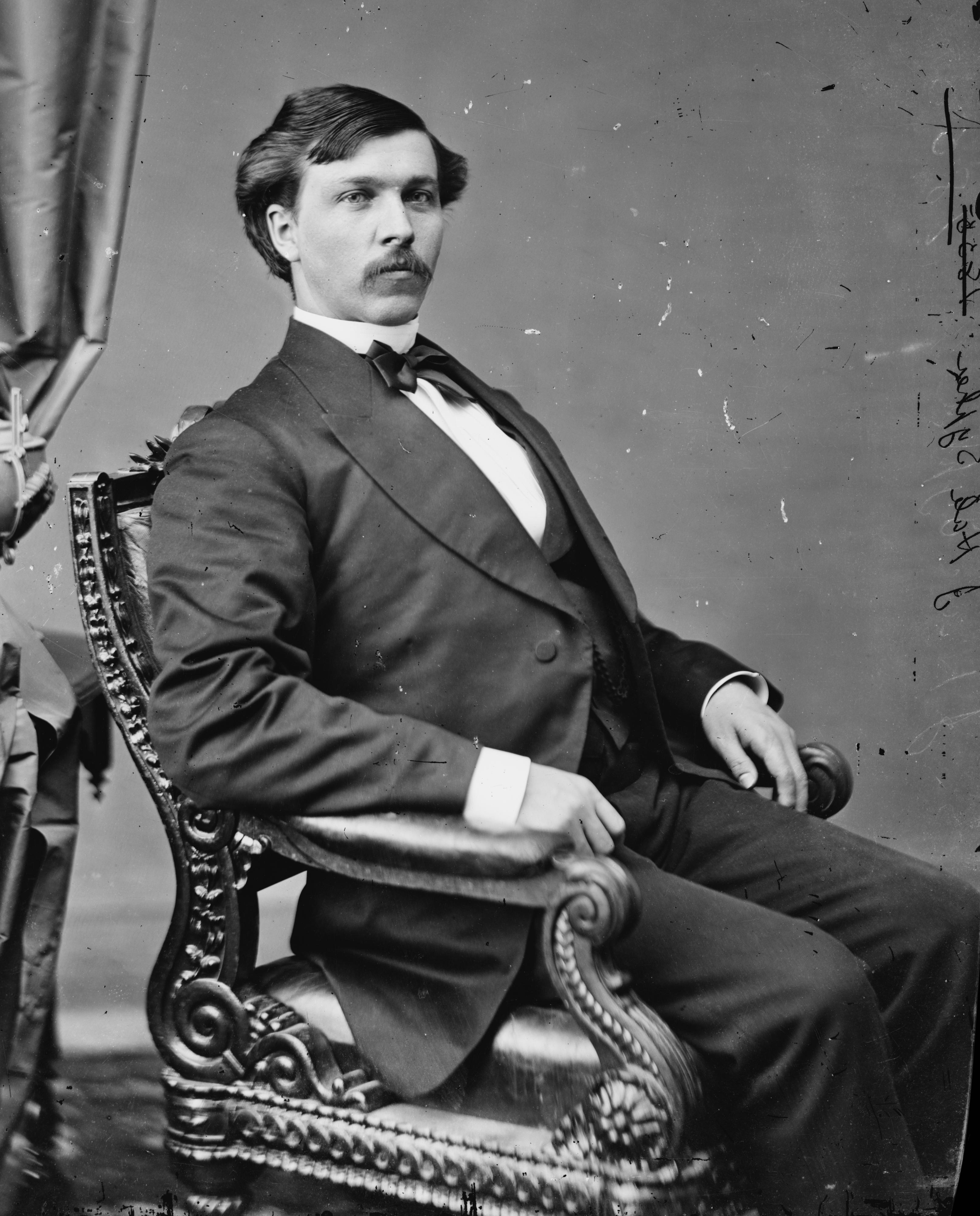

Member of the U.S. House of Representatives from Louisiana's 1st district
- In office July 18, 1868 – March 3, 1875
- Preceded by: Benjamin Flanders
- Succeeded by: Effingham Lawrence

Personal details
- Born: Jacob Hale Sypher; June 22, 1837 Millerstown, Pennsylvania, U.S.
- Died: May 9, 1905 (aged 67) Baltimore, Maryland, U.S.
- Resting place: Arlington National Cemetery, Washington, D.C.
- Party: Republican

Military service
- Allegiance: United States
- Branch/service: Union Army
- Rank: Colonel; Brevet Brigadier General
- Unit: Battery B, 1st Ohio Light Artillery; 14th Rhode Island Heavy Artillery (Colored)
- Battles/wars: American Civil War

Jacob Hale Sypher (June 22, 1837 – May 9, 1905) was an attorney and politician, elected as a member of the U.S. House of Representatives representing Louisiana. He served four terms as a Republican, after having served in the Union Army during the American Civil War.

== Early life and education ==
Jacob Hale Sypher was born near Millerstown, Pennsylvania and attended local schools. He graduated from Alfred University in New York state in 1859.

== Civil War ==
Sypher enlisted in the Union Army during the American Civil War as a private in Battery A, 1st Ohio Light Artillery Militia (a three-month unit). After his battery's term expired, he was commissioned 1st lieutenant in Battery B, 1st Ohio Light Artillery. In 1864, he was commissioned as colonel to lead the 14th Rhode Island Heavy Artillery (Colored) (later re-designated as the 11th United States Colored Heavy Artillery) of the United States Colored Troops. Sypher never exercised operational command of the unit, as he was assigned to court-martial duty throughout the regiment's service. Afterwards he was brevetted Brigadier General for his services throughout the war.

== Law and Politics ==
After the war, Sypher moved to northern Louisiana where he bought a plantation. This was not to his liking so he moved to New Orleans and studied law. After a short period of time, he was admitted to the Bar of the state of Louisiana.

He was first elected as a Republican to Congress in 1866 from Louisiana's 1st congressional district. He may have lost the 1868 election, but there were so many irregularities that Congress threw it out and a second election was held. Sypher won the second round. He was re-elected twice more, serving in Congress from July 18, 1868 until March 3, 1875.

In 1872, Sypher at first seemed to win the election, being certified the winner and sworn in to Congress. But his opponent Effingham Lawrence, a Democrat, contested the election. After a lengthy investigation, the House decided that the reported returns were wrong (due to two competing sets of returns) and, on the final day of Congress, Sypher was removed from office.

It was the first time that a Democrat had been elected to Congress from Louisiana since before the Civil War. During the campaign, the White League, a paramilitary group affiliated with the Democratic Party, had been active in intimidating blacks to suppress black voting in the state. This was the beginning of the end of the Reconstruction in Louisiana. At the next election, there was even more violence, black voting was suppressed, and the Democrats regained control of the state legislature. In 1877, federal troops were withdrawn from the state.

Sypher left Louisiana, moving to Washington, DC, to practice law. He died in Baltimore in 1905.

U.S. House of Representatives
Preceded by Benjamin Flanders (Vacant 1863–1867)	Member of the U.S. House of Representatives from Louisiana's 1st congressional district 1867–1875	Succeeded by Effingham Lawrence
