= List of United States representatives in the 42nd Congress =

This is a complete list of United States representatives during the 42nd United States Congress listed by seniority.

As an historical article, the districts and party affiliations listed reflect those during the 42nd Congress (March 4, 1871 – March 3, 1873). Seats and party affiliations on similar lists for other congresses will be different for certain members.

Seniority depends on the date on which members were sworn into office. Since many members are sworn in on the same day, subsequent ranking is based on previous congressional service of the individual and then by alphabetical order by the last name of the representative.

Committee chairmanship in the House is often associated with seniority. However, party leadership is typically not associated with seniority.

Note: The "*" indicates that the representative/delegate may have served one or more non-consecutive terms while in the House of Representatives of the United States Congress.

== U.S. House seniority list ==
U.S. House seniority
Rank	Representative	Party	District	Seniority date (previous service, if any)	No. of term(s)	Notes
1	Henry L. Dawes	R	MA-10	March 4, 1857	8th term	Dean of the House
2	William D. Kelley	R	PA-04	March 4, 1861	6th term	
3	Samuel Hooper	R	MA-04	December 2, 1861	6th term	
4	Oakes Ames	R	MA-02	March 4, 1863	5th term	Left the House in 1873.
5	James G. Blaine	R	ME-03	March 4, 1863	5th term	Speaker of the House
6	Charles A. Eldredge	D	WI-04	March 4, 1863	5th term	
7	John F. Farnsworth	R	IL-02	March 4, 1863; Previous service, 1857–1861.	7th term*	Left the House in 1873.
8	James A. Garfield	R	OH-19	March 4, 1863	5th term	
9	Samuel J. Randall	D	PA-01	March 4, 1863	5th term	
10	Glenni W. Scofield	R	PA-19	March 4, 1863	5th term	
11	William B. Washburn	R	MA-09	March 4, 1863	5th term	Resigned on December 5, 1871.
12	John Bingham	R	OH-16	March 4, 1865; Previous service, 1855–1863.	8th term*	Left the House in 1873.
13	Burton C. Cook	R	IL-06	March 4, 1865	4th term	Resigned on August 26, 1871.
14	Michael C. Kerr	D	IN-02	March 4, 1865	4th term	Left the House in 1873.
15	John H. Ketcham	R	NY-12	March 4, 1865	4th term	Left the House in 1873.
16	John Lynch	R	ME-01	March 4, 1865	4th term	Left the House in 1873.
17	Samuel S. Marshall	D	IL-11	March 4, 1865; Previous service, 1855–1859.	6th term*	
18	Ulysses Mercur	R	PA-13	March 4, 1865	4th term	Resigned on December 2, 1872.
19	William E. Niblack	D	IN-01	March 4, 1865; Previous service, 1857–1861.	6th term*	
20	Philetus Sawyer	R	WI-05	March 4, 1865	3rd term	
21	Nathaniel P. Banks	R	MA-06	December 4, 1865; Previous service, 1853–1857.	7th term*	Left the House in 1873.
22	Horace Maynard	R	TN-02	July 24, 1866; Previous service, 1857–1863.	7th term*	
23	George M. Adams	D	KY-08	March 4, 1867	3rd term	
24	Stevenson Archer	D	MD-02	March 4, 1867	3rd term	
25	William Henry Barnum	D	CT-04	March 4, 1867	3rd term	
26	James B. Beck	D	KY-07	March 4, 1867	3rd term	
27	Austin Blair	R	MI-03	March 4, 1867	3rd term	Left the House in 1873.
28	James Brooks	D	NY-08	March 4, 1867; Previous service, 1849–1853 and 1863–1866.	7th term**	
29	Benjamin Butler	R	MA-05	March 4, 1867	3rd term	
30	Roderick R. Butler	R	TN-01	March 4, 1867	3rd term	
31	John Coburn	R	IN-05	March 4, 1867	3rd term	
32	James L. Getz	D	PA-08	March 4, 1867	3rd term	Left the House in 1873.
33	John Hill	R	NJ-04	March 4, 1867	3rd term	Left the House in 1873.
34	William S. Holman	D	IN-03	March 4, 1867; Previous service, 1859–1865.	6th term*	
35	John A. Peters	R	ME-04	March 4, 1867	3rd term	Left the House in 1873.
36	Luke P. Poland	R	VT-02	March 4, 1867	3rd term	
37	John P. C. Shanks	R	IN-09	March 4, 1867; Previous service, 1861–1863.	4th term*	
38	Worthington C. Smith	R	VT-03	March 4, 1867	3rd term	Left the House in 1873.
39	Henry H. Starkweather	R	CT-03	March 4, 1867	3rd term	
40	J. Hale Sypher	R	LA-01	March 4, 1867	3rd term	
41	John Taffe	D	NE	March 4, 1867	3rd term	Left the House in 1873.
42	Ginery Twichell	R	MA-03	March 4, 1867	3rd term	Left the House in 1873.
43	Philadelph Van Trump	D	OH-12	March 4, 1867	3rd term	Left the House in 1873.
44	William Williams	R	IN-10	March 4, 1867	3rd term	
45	John T. Wilson	R	OH-11	March 4, 1867	3rd term	Left the House in 1873.
46	Fernando Wood	D	NY-09	March 4, 1867; Previous service, 1841–1843 and 1863–1865.	5th term**	
47	James R. McCormick	D	MO-03	December 17, 1867	3rd term	Left the House in 1873.
48	John Beatty	R	OH-08	February 5, 1868	3rd term	Left the House in 1873.
49	Charles Waldron Buckley	R	AL-02	July 21, 1868	3rd term	Left the House in 1873.
50	Oliver J. Dickey	R	PA-09	December 7, 1868	3rd term	Left the House in 1873.
51	Jacob A. Ambler	R	OH-17	March 4, 1869	2nd term	Left the House in 1873.
52	Benjamin T. Biggs	D	DE	March 4, 1869	2nd term	Left the House in 1873.
53	John T. Bird	D	NJ-03	March 4, 1869	2nd term	Left the House in 1873.
54	James Buffington	R	MA-01	March 4, 1869; Previous service, 1855–1863.	6th term*	
55	Samuel S. Burdett	R	MO-05	March 4, 1869	2nd term	Left the House in 1873.
56	Clinton L. Cobb	R	NC-01	March 4, 1869	2nd term	
57	Omar D. Conger	R	MI-05	March 4, 1869	2nd term	
58	Samuel S. Cox	D	NY-06	March 4, 1869; Previous service, 1857–1865.	6th term*	Left the House in 1873.
59	John M. Crebs	D	IL-13	March 4, 1869	2nd term	Left the House in 1873.
60	Chester Bidwell Darrall	R	LA-03	March 4, 1869	2nd term	
61	Peter M. Dox	D	AL-05	March 4, 1869	2nd term	Left the House in 1873.
62	Gustavus A. Finkelnburg	R	MO-02	March 4, 1869	2nd term	Left the House in 1873.
63	Richard J. Haldeman	D	PA-15	March 4, 1869	2nd term	Left the House in 1873.
64	Eugene Hale	R	ME-05	March 4, 1869	2nd term	
65	Samuel Hambleton	D	MD-01	March 4, 1869	2nd term	Left the House in 1873.
66	John B. Hawley	R	IL-04	March 4, 1869	2nd term	
67	John B. Hay	D	IL-12	March 4, 1869	2nd term	Left the House in 1873.
68	Charles Hays	R	AL-04	March 4, 1869	2nd term	
69	George Frisbie Hoar	R	MA-08	March 4, 1869	2nd term	
70	Stephen W. Kellogg	R	CT-02	March 4, 1869	2nd term	
71	George W. McCrary	R	IA-01	March 4, 1869	2nd term	
72	James McGrew	R	WV-02	March 4, 1869	2nd term	Left the House in 1873.
73	Thompson W. McNeely	D	IL-09	March 4, 1869	2nd term	Left the House in 1873.
74	George W. Morgan	D	OH-13	March 4, 1869; Previous service, 1867–1868.	3rd term*	Left the House in 1873.
75	Jesse Hale Moore	R	IL-07	March 4, 1869	2nd term	Left the House in 1873.
76	Frank Morey	R	LA-05	March 4, 1869	2nd term	
77	James S. Negley	R	PA-22	March 4, 1869	2nd term	
78	Jasper Packard	R	IN-11	March 4, 1869	2nd term	
79	John B. Packer	R	PA-14	March 4, 1869	2nd term	
80	Francis W. Palmer	R	IA-05	March 4, 1869	2nd term	Left the House in 1873.
81	Clarkson N. Potter	D	NY-10	March 4, 1869	2nd term	
82	John M. Rice	D	KY-09	March 4, 1869	2nd term	Left the House in 1873.
83	Aaron A. Sargent	R	CA-02	March 4, 1869; Previous service, 1861–1863.	3rd term*	Left the House in 1873.
84	Lionel Allen Sheldon	R	LA-02	March 4, 1869	2nd term	
85	Francis E. Shober	D	NC-06	March 4, 1869	2nd term	Left the House in 1873.
86	Henry Warner Slocum	D	NY-03	March 4, 1869	2nd term	Left the House in 1873.
87	John Armstrong Smith	R	OH-06	March 4, 1869	2nd term	Left the House in 1873.
88	Job E. Stevenson	R	OH-02	March 4, 1869	2nd term	Left the House in 1873.
89	William L. Stoughton	R	MI-02	March 4, 1869	2nd term	Left the House in 1873.
90	Julius L. Strong	R	CT-01	March 4, 1869	2nd term	Died on September 7, 1872.
91	Thomas Swann	D	MD-03	March 4, 1869	2nd term	
92	Washington Townsend	R	PA-07	March 4, 1869	2nd term	
93	James N. Tyner	R	IN-08	March 4, 1869	2nd term	
94	William H. Upson	R	OH-18	March 4, 1869	2nd term	Left the House in 1873.
95	Daniel W. Voorhees	D	IN-06	March 4, 1869; Previous service, 1861–1866.	5th term*	Left the House in 1873.
96	Erastus Wells	D	MO-01	March 4, 1869	2nd term	
97	William A. Wheeler	R	NY-17	March 4, 1869; Previous service, 1861–1863.	3rd term*	
98	Charles W. Willard	R	VT-01	March 4, 1869	2nd term	
99	Boyd Winchester	D	KY-05	March 4, 1869	2nd term	Left the House in 1873.
100	Leonard Myers	R	PA-03	April 8, 1869; Previous service, 1863–1869.	5th term*	
101	George M. Brooks	R	MA-07	November 2, 1869	2nd term	Resigned on May 13, 1872.
102	Horatio C. Burchard	R	IL-03	December 6, 1869	2nd term	
103	Charles H. Porter	R	VA-03	January 26, 1870	2nd term	Left the House in 1873.
104	James H. Platt Jr.	R	VA-02	January 27, 1870	2nd term	
105	George E. Harris	R	MS-01	February 23, 1870	2nd term	Left the House in 1873.
106	George C. McKee	R	MS-04	February 23, 1870	2nd term	
107	Joseph L. Morphis	R	MS-02	February 23, 1870	2nd term	Left the House in 1873.
108	Legrand W. Perce	R	MS-05	February 23, 1870	2nd term	Left the House in 1873.
109	William T. Clark	R	TX-03	March 30, 1870	2nd term	Resigned on May 13, 1872.
110	John C. Conner	D	TX-02	March 30, 1870	2nd term	Left the House in 1873.
111	Henry W. Barry	R	MS-03	April 8, 1870	2nd term	
112	Erasmus D. Peck	R	OH-10	April 23, 1870	2nd term	Left the House in 1873.
113	Joseph H. Lewis	D	KY-03	May 10, 1870	2nd term	Left the House in 1873.
114	Alexander S. Wallace	R	SC-04	May 27, 1870	2nd term	
115	Richard Thomas Walker Duke	D	VA-05	November 8, 1870	2nd term	Left the House in 1873.
116	Joseph Rainey	R	SC-01	December 12, 1870	2nd term	
117	William P. Price	D	GA-06	December 22, 1870	2nd term	Left the House in 1873.
118	Richard H. Whiteley	R	GA-02	December 22, 1870	2nd term	
119	Pierce M. B. Young	D	GA-07	December 22, 1870; Previous service, 1868–1869.	3rd term*	
120	Ephraim Leister Acker	D	PA-06	March 4, 1871	1st term	Left the House in 1873.
121	William E. Arthur	D	KY-06	March 4, 1871	1st term	
122	John T. Averill	R	MN-02	March 4, 1871	1st term	
123	J. Allen Barber	R	WI-03	March 4, 1871	1st term	
124	Samuel N. Bell	D	NH-02	March 4, 1871	1st term	Left the House in 1873.
125	John S. Bigby	R	GA-03	March 4, 1871	1st term	Left the House in 1873.
126	James G. Blair	R	MO-08	March 4, 1871	1st term	Left the House in 1873.
127	Elliott M. Braxton	D	VA-07	March 4, 1871	1st term	Left the House in 1873.
128	John M. Bright	D	TN-04	March 4, 1871	1st term	
129	Robert P. Caldwell	D	TN-07	March 4, 1871	1st term	Left the House in 1873.
130	Lewis D. Campbell	D	OH-03	March 4, 1871; Previous service, 1849–1858.	6th term*	Left the House in 1873.
131	John M. Carroll	D	NY-18	March 4, 1871	1st term	Left the House in 1873.
132	Freeman Clarke	R	NY-28	March 4, 1871; Previous service, 1863–1865.	2nd term*	
133	John M. Coghlan	R	CA-03	March 4, 1871	1st term	Left the House in 1873.
134	Abram Comingo	D	MO-06	March 4, 1871	1st term	
135	Aylett R. Cotton	R	IA-02	March 4, 1871	1st term	
136	John V. Creely	R	PA-02	March 4, 1871	1st term	Left the House in 1873.
137	John Critcher	D	VA-01	March 4, 1871	1st term	Left the House in 1873.
138	Edward Crossland	D	KY-01	March 4, 1871	1st term	
139	Robert C. De Large	R	SC-02	March 4, 1871	1st term	Resigned on January 24, 1873.
140	John J. Davis	D	WV-01	March 4, 1871	1st term	
141	William G. Donnan	R	IA-03	March 4, 1871	1st term	
142	Dudley M. DuBose	D	GA-05	March 4, 1871	1st term	Left the House in 1873.
143	R. Holland Duell	R	NY-23	March 4, 1871; Previous service, 1859–1863.	3rd term*	
144	Mark H. Dunnell	R	MN-01	March 4, 1871	1st term	
145	Benjamin T. Eames	R	RI-01	March 4, 1871	1st term	
146	John Edwards	R	AR-03	March 4, 1871	1st term	Resigned on February 9, 1872.
147	Robert B. Elliott	R	SC-03	March 4, 1871	1st term	
148	Smith Ely Jr.	D	NY-07	March 4, 1871	1st term	Left the House in 1873.
149	Charles B. Farwell	R	IL-01	March 4, 1871	1st term	
150	Samuel C. Forker	D	NJ-02	March 4, 1871	1st term	Left the House in 1873.
151	Charles Foster	R	OH-09	March 4, 1871	1st term	Left the House in 1873.
152	Henry D. Foster	D	PA-21	March 4, 1871; Previous service, 1843–1847.	3rd term*	Left the House in 1873.
153	William P. Frye	R	ME-02	March 4, 1871	1st term	
154	Abraham E. Garrett	D	TN-03	March 4, 1871	1st term	Left the House in 1873.
155	Edward I. Golladay	D	TN-05	March 4, 1871	1st term	Left the House in 1873.
156	Samuel Griffith	D	PA-20	March 4, 1871	1st term	Left the House in 1873.
157	Milo Goodrich	R	NY-26	March 4, 1871	1st term	Left the House in 1873.
158	Charles St. John	R	NY-11	March 4, 1871	1st term	
159	George A. Halsey	R	NJ-05	March 4, 1871; Previous service, 1867–1869.	2nd term*	Left the House in 1873.
160	John Hancock	D	TX-04	March 4, 1871	1st term	
161	William A. Handley	D	AL-03	March 4, 1871	1st term	Left the House in 1873.
162	James M. Hanks	D	AR-01	March 4, 1871	1st term	Left the House in 1873.
163	Alfred C. Harmer	R	PA-05	March 4, 1871	1st term	
164	James C. Harper	D	NC-07	March 4, 1871	1st term	Left the House in 1873.
165	John T. Harris	D	VA-06	March 4, 1871; Previous service, 1859–1861.	2nd term*	
166	Harrison E. Havens	R	MO-04	March 4, 1871	1st term	
167	Gerry Whiting Hazelton	R	WI-02	March 4, 1871	1st term	
168	John W. Hazelton	R	NJ-01	March 4, 1871	1st term	
169	Frank Hereford	D	WV-03	March 4, 1871	1st term	
170	William S. Herndon	D	TX-01	March 4, 1871	1st term	
171	Ellery Albee Hibbard	D	NH-01	March 4, 1871	1st term	Left the House in 1873.
172	Sherman Otis Houghton	R	CA-01	March 4, 1871	1st term	
173	Charles West Kendall	D	NV	March 4, 1871	1st term	
174	John Weinland Killinger	R	PA-10	March 4, 1871; Previous service, 1859–1863.	3rd term*	
175	Andrew King	R	MO-09	March 4, 1871	1st term	Left the House in 1873.
176	Thomas Kinsella	D	NY-02	March 4, 1871	1st term	Left the House in 1873.
177	Charles N. Lamison	D	OH-05	March 4, 1871	1st term	
178	William H. Lamport	R	NY-25	March 4, 1871	1st term	
179	William E. Lansing	R	NY-22	March 4, 1871; Previous service, 1861–1863.	2nd term*	
180	James M. Leach	D	NC-05	March 4, 1871; Previous service, 1859–1861.	2nd term*	
181	David P. Lowe	R	KS	March 4, 1871	1st term	
182	Archibald T. MacIntyre	D	GA-01	March 4, 1871	1st term	Left the House in 1873.
183	Mahlon Dickerson Manson	D	IN-07	March 4, 1871	1st term	Left the House in 1873.
184	James McCleery	R	LA-04	March 4, 1871	1st term	Died on November 5, 1871.
185	William McClelland	D	PA-24	March 4, 1871	1st term	Left the House in 1873.
186	Henry D. McHenry	D	KY-02	March 4, 1871	1st term	Left the House in 1873.
187	Ebenezer McJunkin	R	PA-23	March 4, 1871	1st term	
188	John F. McKinney	D	OH-04	March 4, 1871; Previous service, 1863–1865.	2nd term*	Left the House in 1873.
189	Clinton L. Merriam	R	NY-20	March 4, 1871	1st term	
190	William M. Merrick	D	MD-05	March 4, 1871	1st term	Left the House in 1873.
191	Benjamin F. Meyers	D	PA-16	March 4, 1871	1st term	Left the House in 1873.
192	Alexander Mitchell	D	WI-01	March 4, 1871	1st term	
193	James Monroe	R	OH-14	March 4, 1871	1st term	Left the House in 1873.
194	Jackson Orr	R	IA-06	March 4, 1871	1st term	
195	Hosea W. Parker	D	NH-03	March 4, 1871	1st term	
196	Isaac C. Parker	R	MO-07	March 4, 1871	1st term	
197	James M. Pendleton	R	RI-02	March 4, 1871	1st term	
198	Aaron F. Perry	R	OH-01	March 4, 1871	1st term	Resigned on July 14, 1872.
199	Eli Perry	D	NY-14	March 4, 1871	1st term	
200	Elizur H. Prindle	R	NY-19	March 4, 1871	1st term	Left the House in 1873.
201	William B. Read	D	KY-04	March 4, 1871	1st term	
202	Edward Y. Rice	D	IL-10	March 4, 1871	1st term	Left the House in 1873.
203	John Ritchie	D	MD-04	March 4, 1871	1st term	Left the House in 1873.
204	Ellis H. Roberts	R	NY-21	March 4, 1871	1st term	
205	William R. Roberts	D	NY-05	March 4, 1871	1st term	
206	James C. Robinson	D	IL-08	March 4, 1871; Previous service, 1859–1865.	5th term*	
207	John Rogers	D	NY-16	March 4, 1871	1st term	Left the House in 1873.
208	Sion H. Rogers	D	NC-04	March 4, 1871; Previous service, 1853–1855.	2nd term*	Left the House in 1873.
209	Robert Roosevelt	D	NY-04	March 4, 1871	1st term	Left the House in 1873.
210	Jeremiah McLain Rusk	R	WI-06	March 4, 1871	1st term	
211	John E. Seeley	R	NY-24	March 4, 1871	1st term	Left the House in 1873.
212	Walter L. Sessions	R	NY-31	March 4, 1871	1st term	
213	Samuel Shellabarger	R	OH-07	March 4, 1871; Previous service, 1861–1863 and 1865–1869.	4th term**	Left the House in 1873.
214	Henry Sherwood	D	PA-18	March 4, 1871	1st term	Left the House in 1873.
215	Lazarus D. Shoemaker	R	PA-12	March 4, 1871	1st term	
216	James H. Slater	D	OR	March 4, 1871	1st term	Left the House in 1873.
217	Joseph H. Sloss	D	AL-06	March 4, 1871	1st term	
218	Horace B. Smith	R	NY-27	March 4, 1871	1st term	
219	Oliver P. Snyder	R	AR-02	March 4, 1871	1st term	
220	Robert M. Speer	D	PA-17	March 4, 1871	1st term	
221	Thomas J. Speer	R	GA-04	March 4, 1871	1st term	Died on August 18, 1872.
222	William P. Sprague	R	OH-15	March 4, 1871	1st term	
223	Bradford N. Stevens	D	IL-05	March 4, 1871	1st term	Left the House in 1873.
224	John B. Storm	D	PA-11	March 4, 1871	1st term	
225	William Henry Harrison Stowell	R	VA-04	March 4, 1871	1st term	
226	Jabez G. Sutherland	D	MI-06	March 4, 1871	1st term	Left the House in 1873.
227	William Terry	D	VA-08	March 4, 1871	1st term	Left the House in 1873.
228	Charles R. Thomas	R	NC-02	March 4, 1871	1st term	
229	Dwight Townsend	D	NY-01	March 4, 1871; Previous service, 1864–1865.	2nd term*	Left the House in 1873.
230	Benjamin S. Turner	R	AL-01	March 4, 1871	1st term	Left the House in 1873.
231	Joseph H. Tuthill	D	NY-13	March 4, 1871	1st term	Left the House in 1873.
232	William W. Vaughan	D	TN-08	March 4, 1871	1st term	Left the House in 1873.
233	Alfred Moore Waddell	D	NC-03	March 4, 1871	1st term	
234	Seth Wakeman	R	NY-29	March 4, 1871	1st term	Left the House in 1873.
235	Madison Miner Walden	R	IA-04	March 4, 1871	1st term	Left the House in 1873.
236	Henry Waldron	R	MI-01	March 4, 1871; Previous service, 1855–1861.	4th term*	
237	Josiah T. Walls	R	FL	March 4, 1871	1st term	Resigned on January 29, 1873.
238	Joseph M. Warren	D	NY-15	March 4, 1871	1st term	Left the House in 1873.
239	Washington C. Whitthorne	D	TN-06	March 4, 1871	1st term	
240	William Williams	D	NY-30	March 4, 1871	1st term	Left the House in 1873.
241	Jeremiah M. Wilson	R	IN-04	March 4, 1871	1st term	
	John L. Beveridge	R	IL	November 7, 1871	1st term	Resigned on January 4, 1873.
	Wilder D. Foster	R	MI-04	December 4, 1871	1st term	
	Henry Snapp	R	IL-06	December 4, 1871	1st term	Left the House in 1873.
	Alvah Crocker	R	MA-09	January 2, 1872	1st term	
	Thomas Boles	R	AR-03	February 9, 1872; Previous service, 1868–1871.	3rd term*	Left the House in 1873.
	Dewitt C. Giddings	D	TX-03	May 13, 1872	1st term	
	Ozro J. Dodds	D	OH-01	October 8, 1872	1st term	Left the House in 1873.
	Erasmus W. Beck	D	GA-04	December 2, 1872	1st term	Left the House in 1873.
	Joseph Roswell Hawley	R	CT-01	December 2, 1872	1st term	
	Constantine C. Esty	R	MA-07	December 2, 1872	1st term	Left the House in 1873.
	Alexander Boarman	R	LA-04	December 3, 1872	1st term	Left the House in 1873.
	Frank C. Bunnell	R	PA-13	December 24, 1872	1st term	Left the House in 1873.
	Silas L. Niblack	D	FL	January 29, 1873	1st term	Left the House in 1873.

== Delegates ==
Rank	Delegate	Party	District	Seniority date (previous service, if any)	No. of term(s)	Notes
1	William Henry Hooper	D	UT	March 4, 1865; Previous service, 1859–1861.	5th term*	
2	Richard Cunningham McCormick	R	AZ	March 4, 1869	2nd term	
3	Selucius Garfielde	R	WA	March 4, 1869	2nd term	
4	Moses K. Armstrong	D	DAK	March 4, 1871	1st term	
5	Jerome B. Chaffee	R	CO	March 4, 1871	1st term	
6	William H. Clagett	R	MT	March 4, 1871	1st term	
7	José Manuel Gallegos	D	NM	March 4, 1871; Previous service, 1853–1856.	3rd term*	
8	William Theopilus Jones	R	WY	March 4, 1871	1st term	
9	Samuel Augustus Merritt	D	ID	March 4, 1871	1st term	
	Norton P. Chipman	R	DC	April 21, 1871	1st term	

== See also ==
- 42nd United States Congress
- List of United States congressional districts
- List of United States senators in the 42nd Congress
