= List of United States senators in the 42nd Congress =

This is a complete list of United States senators during the 42nd United States Congress listed by seniority from March 4, 1871, to March 3, 1873.

Order of service is based on the commencement of the senator's first term. Behind this is former service as a senator (only giving the senator seniority within their new incoming class), service as vice president, a House member, a cabinet secretary, or a governor of a state. The final factor is the population of the senator's state.

Senators who were sworn in during the middle of the Congress (up until the last senator who was not sworn in early after winning the November 1872 election) are listed at the end of the list with no number.

== Terms of service ==
Class	Terms of service of senators that expired in years
Class 3	Terms of service of senators that expired in 1873 (AL, AR, CA, CT, FL, GA, IA, IL, IN, KS, KY, LA, MD, MO, NC, NH, NV, NY, ND, OH, OR, PA, SC, VT, and WI.)
Class 1	Terms of service of senators that expired in 1875 (CA, CT, DE, FL, IN, MA, MD, ME, MI, MN, MO, MS, NE, NJ, NV, NY, OH, PA, RI, TN, TX, VA, VT, WI, and WV)
Class 2	Terms of service of senators that expired in 1877 (AL, AR, DE, GA, IA, IL, KS, KY, LA, MA, ME, MI, MN, MS, NC, NE, NH, NJ, OR, RI, SC, TN, TX, VA, and WV.)

== U.S. Senate seniority list ==
U.S. Senate seniority
Rank	Senator (party-state)	Seniority date	Other factors
1	Charles Sumner (LR-MA)	April 11, 1851	
2	Henry Wilson (R-MA)	January 31, 1855	
3	Lyman Trumbull (R-IL)	March 4, 1855	
4	Zachariah Chandler (R-MI)	March 4, 1857	
5	Henry B. Anthony (R-RI)	March 4, 1859	Former governor
6	Timothy O. Howe (R-WI)	March 4, 1861	
7	John Sherman (R-OH)	March 21, 1861	
8	Samuel C. Pomeroy (R-KS)	April 4, 1861	
9	Garrett Davis (D-KY)	December 23, 1861	
10	Alexander Ramsey (R-MN)	March 4, 1863	
11	William Sprague IV (R-RI)	March 4, 1863	
12	William M. Stewart (R-NV)	February 1, 1865	
13	James W. Nye (R-NV)	February 1, 1865	
14	Aaron H. Cragin (R-NH)	March 4, 1865	
15	George F. Edmunds (R-VT)	April 3, 1866	
16	Thomas Tipton (R-NE)	March 1, 1867	
17	Roscoe Conkling (R-NY)	March 4, 1867	
18	Justin Smith Morrill (R-VT)	March 4, 1867	
19	Oliver P. Morton (R-IN)	March 4, 1867	
20	Simon Cameron (R-PA)	March 4, 1867	
21	Orris S. Ferry (R-CT)	March 4, 1867	
22	Thomas Tipton (R-NE)	March 4, 1867	
23	Cornelius Cole (R-CA)	March 4, 1867	
24	James Harlan (R-IA)	March 4, 1867	
25	James W. Patterson (R-NH)	March 4, 1867	
26	Henry W. Corbett (R-OR)	March 4, 1867	
27	George Vickers (D-MD)	March 7, 1868	
28	Benjamin F. Rice (R-AR)	June 23, 1868	
29	Thomas W. Osborn (R-FL)	June 25, 1868	
30	William P. Kellogg (R-LA)	July 9, 1868	
31	George E. Spencer (R-AL)	July 13, 1868	
32	John Pool (R-NC)	July 14, 1868	
33	Thomas J. Robertson (R-SC)	July 15, 1868	
34	Frederick A. Sawyer (R-SC)	July 16, 1868	
35	Thomas F. Bayard (D-DE)	March 4, 1869	
36	Hannibal Hamlin (R-ME)	March 4, 1869	
37	Allen G. Thurman (D-OH)	March 4, 1869	
38	Eugene Casserly (D-CA)	March 4, 1869	
39	William A. Buckingham (R-CT)	March 4, 1869	
40	Abijah Gilbert (R-FL)	March 4, 1869	
41	Daniel D. Pratt (R-IN)	March 4, 1869	
42	William T. Hamilton (D-MD)	March 4, 1869	
43	Carl Schurz (R-MO)	March 4, 1869	
44	John P. Stockton (D-NJ)	March 4, 1869	
45	Reuben Fenton (R-NY)	March 4, 1869	
46	John Scott (R-PA)	March 4, 1869	
47	William G. Brownlow (R-TN)	March 4, 1869	
48	Arthur I. Boreman (R-WV)	March 4, 1869	
49	Matthew H. Carpenter (R-WI)	March 4, 1869	
50	Lot M. Morrill (D-ME)	October 30, 1869	
51	John F. Lewis (R-VA)	January 26, 1870	
52	Adelbert Ames (R-MS)	February 23, 1870	
53	James W. Flanagan (R-TX)	March 30, 1870	
54	Morgan C. Hamilton (R-TX)	March 31, 1870	
55	Francis Preston Blair Jr. (D-MO)	January 20, 1871	
56	Joshua Hill (R-GA)	February 1, 1871	
57	Eli Saulsbury (D-DE)	March 4, 1871	
58	Thomas W. Ferry (R-MI)	March 4, 1871	
59	William Windom (R-MN)	March 4, 1871	Former representative
60	Henry G. Davis (D-WV)	March 4, 1871	
61	George Goldthwaite (D-AL)	March 4, 1871	
62	Powell Clayton (R-AR)	March 4, 1871	
63	John A. Logan (R-IL)	March 4, 1871	
64	George G. Wright (R-IA)	March 4, 1871	
65	John W. Stevenson (D-KY)	March 4, 1871	
66	Joseph R. West (R-LA)	March 4, 1871	
67	Phineas Hitchcock (R-NE)	March 4, 1871	
68	Frederick T. Frelinghuysen (R-NJ)	March 4, 1871	
69	James K. Kelly (D-OR)	March 4, 1871	
70	Henry Cooper (D-TN)	March 4, 1871	
71	Alexander Caldwell (R-KS)	March 4, 1871	
	John W. Johnston (D-VA)	March 15, 1871	
	Thomas M. Norwood (D-GA)	November 14, 1871	
	James L. Alcorn (R-MS)	December 1, 1871	
	Matt W. Ransom (D-NC)	January 30, 1872	
	Willis Benson Machen (D-KY)	September 27, 1872	

== See also ==
- 42nd United States Congress
- List of United States representatives in the 42nd Congress
