= E. B. Dean =

American politician

Edwin. B. Dean
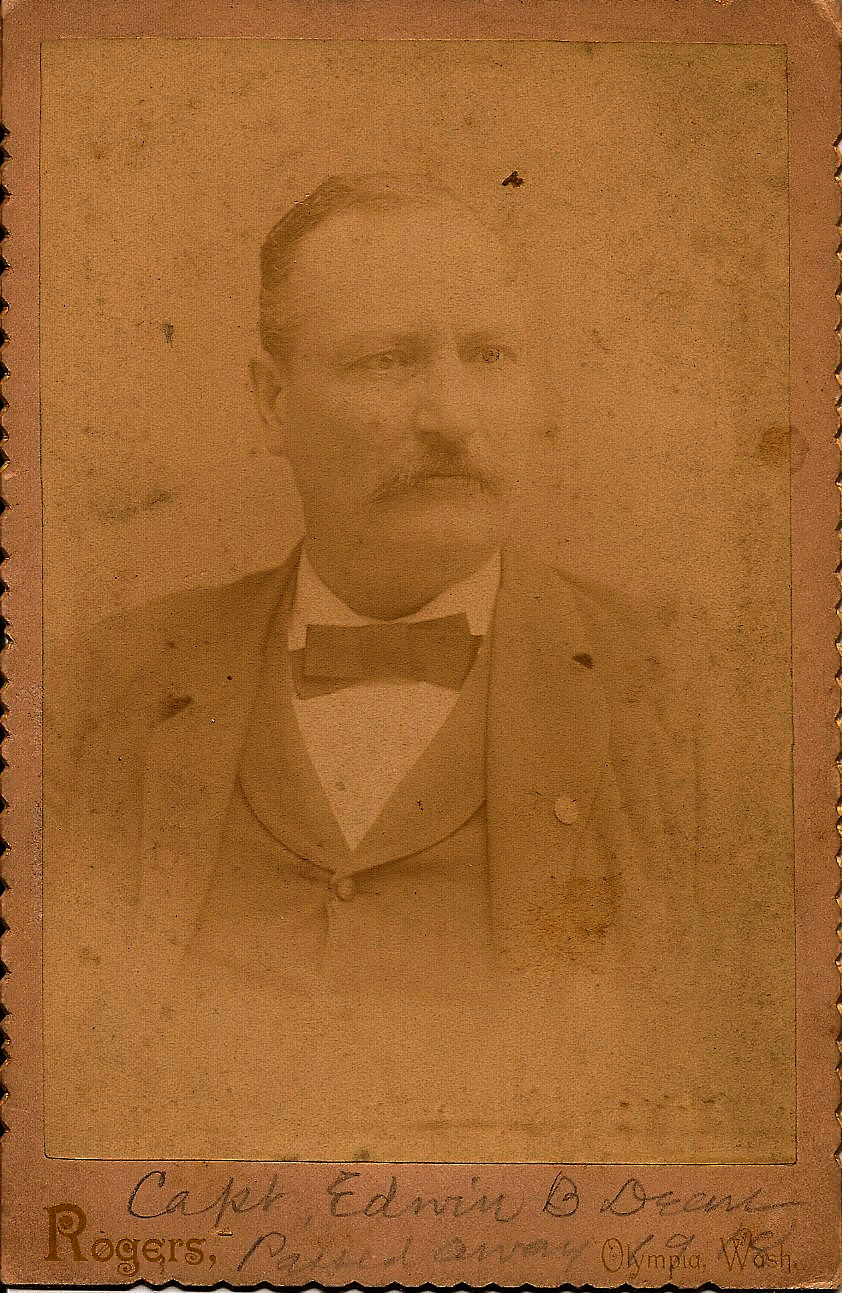
- Republican Representative of the Spokane District to the First Session of the Washington House of Representatives

Member of the Washington House of Representatives
- In office 1889–1891

Personal details
- Born: Edwin Baker Dean; December 3, 1842 Iroquois County, Illinois, US
- Died: December 12, 1917 (aged 75) Sonoma County, California, US
- Party: Republican

Edwin (Edward) Baker Dean (December 3, 1842 – December 12, 1917) was an American politician in the state of Washington. He served in the Washington House of Representatives from 1889 to 1891, representing Spokane as a member of the Republican party.

At seventeen, Dean was a founding member of the "Young Wide Awakes of Muscatine". Like many Wide Awakes he was among the first to volunteer for the Union Army during the Civil War enlisting in the 1st Iowa Infantry and later in the Iowa 18th. In the 18th he rose to the rank of captain. Following the war, he returned to Muscatine, Iowa, where he worked as a mason along with his father and brothers. During the 1870s, he and his brother Hamilton relocated to Boulder, Colorado, where they were known as the "Dean Brothers" and worked as bricklayers until their departure in 1883. Eventually, they settled in the Spokane area.

Four years after his single term as a representative ended, Dean suffered the loss of his brother Hamilton and sister-in-law Lula when they were killed by a tree felled by a road crew. The tragedy was noted in newspapers across the country, with Hamilton erroneously referred to as "Howard". By 1904, Dean had relocated to Sonoma County, California. For unknown reasons, he stopped contacting family and friends from at least 1903 until shortly before his death, at which time he was destitute. Dean died on December 12, 1917, in Sonoma County.
