= Senator Reese =

Senator Reese may refer to:

- David Addison Reese (1794–1871), Georgia State Senate
- Glenn G. Reese (born 1942), South Carolina State Senate

== See also ==
- Senator Rees (disambiguation)
