= 42nd United States Congress =

1871-1873 U.S. Congress

←	41st	43rd	→
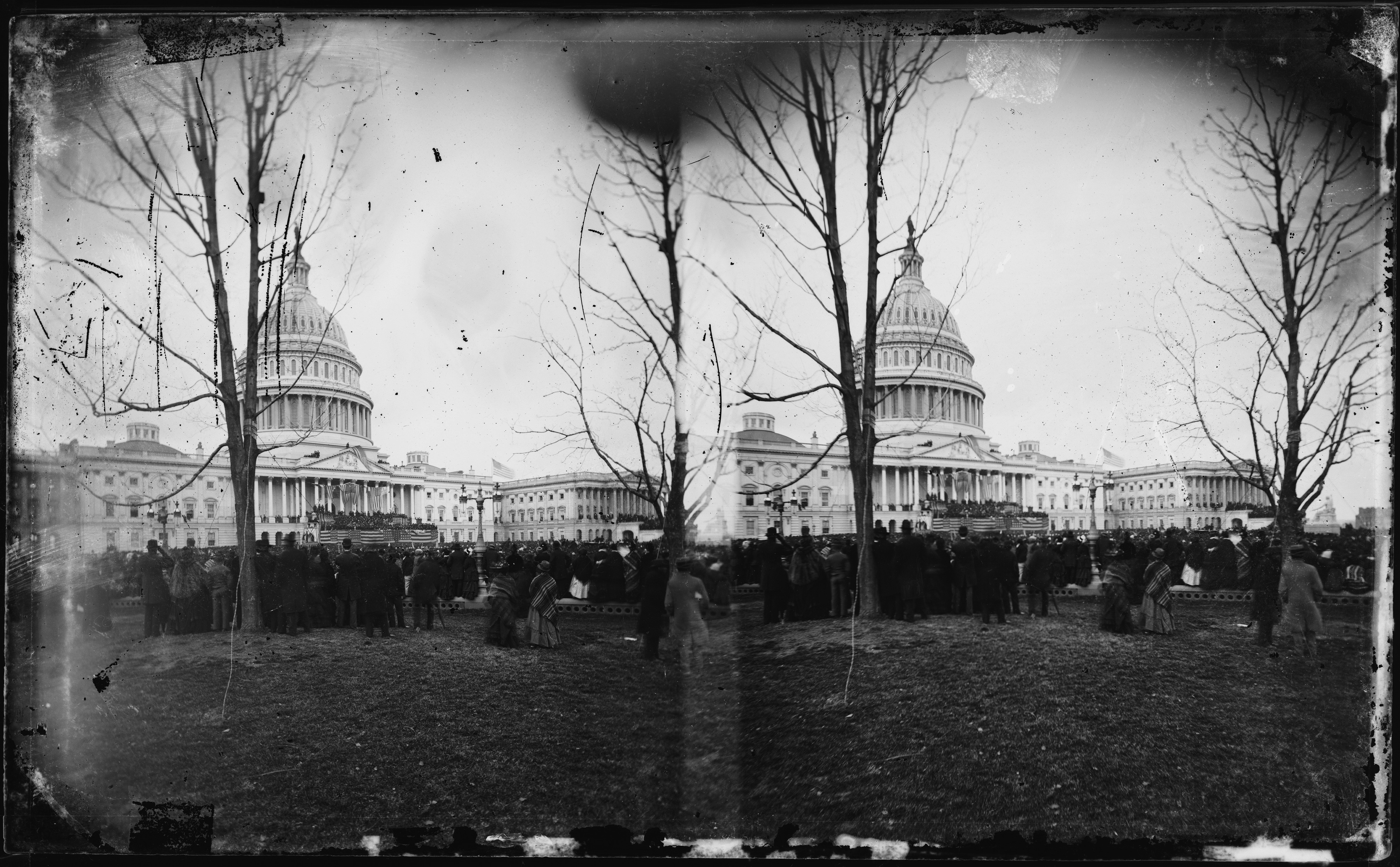
- United States Capitol (1877)

Overview
- Legislative body: United States Congress
- Jurisdiction: United States
- Term: March 4, 1871 – March 4, 1873

Senate
- Members: 74
- President: Schuyler Colfax (R)
- President pro tempore: Henry B. Anthony (R)
- Party control: Republican

House of Representatives
- Members: 243 representatives 10 non-voting delegates
- Speaker: James G. Blaine (R)
- Party control: Republican

Sessions
- 1st: March 4, 1871 – April 20, 1871
- 2nd: December 4, 1871 – June 10, 1872
- 3rd: December 2, 1872 – March 4, 1873

The 42nd United States Congress was a meeting of the legislative branch of the United States federal government, consisting of the United States Senate and the United States House of Representatives. It met in Washington, D.C. from March 4, 1871, to March 4, 1873, during the third and fourth years of Ulysses S. Grant's presidency. The apportionment of seats in the House of Representatives was based on the 1860 United States census. Both chambers had a Republican majority.

== Major events ==
- June 10, 1871: U.S. Marines make naval attack on the Han River forts in Korea
- March 1, 1872: Yellowstone National Park was established as the world's first national park
- November 5, 1872: 1872 United States presidential election

== Major legislation ==
- April 20, 1871: Enforcement Act of 1871
- March 1, 1872: Yellowstone National Park founded
- May 10, 1872: General Mining Act of 1872
- May 23, 1872: Amnesty Act of 1872
- June 1, 1872: Practice Conformity Act (precursor to the Rules Enabling Act), ch. 255, 17 Stat. 196
- February 12, 1873: Coinage Act of 1873
- March 3, 1873: Timber Culture Act
- March 3, 1873: Comstock Act
- March 3, 1873: Salary Grab Act (so called)

== Party summary ==
The count below identifies party affiliations at the beginning of the first session of this Congress, and includes members from vacancies and newly admitted states, when they were first seated. Changes resulting from subsequent replacements are shown below in the "Changes in membership" section.

=== Senate ===
	Party (shading shows control)			Total	Vacant
	Democratic (D)	Liberal Republican (LR)	Republican (R)	Total	Vacant
End of previous congress	12	0	62	74	0
Begin	14	1	55	70	4
End	17	1	54	72	2
Final voting share	23.6%	1.4%	75.0%		
Beginning of next congress	19	3	50	72	2

=== House of Representatives ===
	Party (shading shows control)					Total	Vacant
	Democratic (D)	Independent Republican (IR)	Liberal Republican (LR)	Republican (R)	Other	Total	Vacant
End of previous congress	67	0	0	169	5 (Note: Conservative)	241	2
Begin	102	1	3	135	0	241	2
End	106	1	4	130	0	241	2
Final voting share	44.0%	0.4%	1.7%	53.9%	0.0%		
Beginning of next congress	91	0	4	189	6 (Note: Independent Democratic)	290	2

== Leadership ==
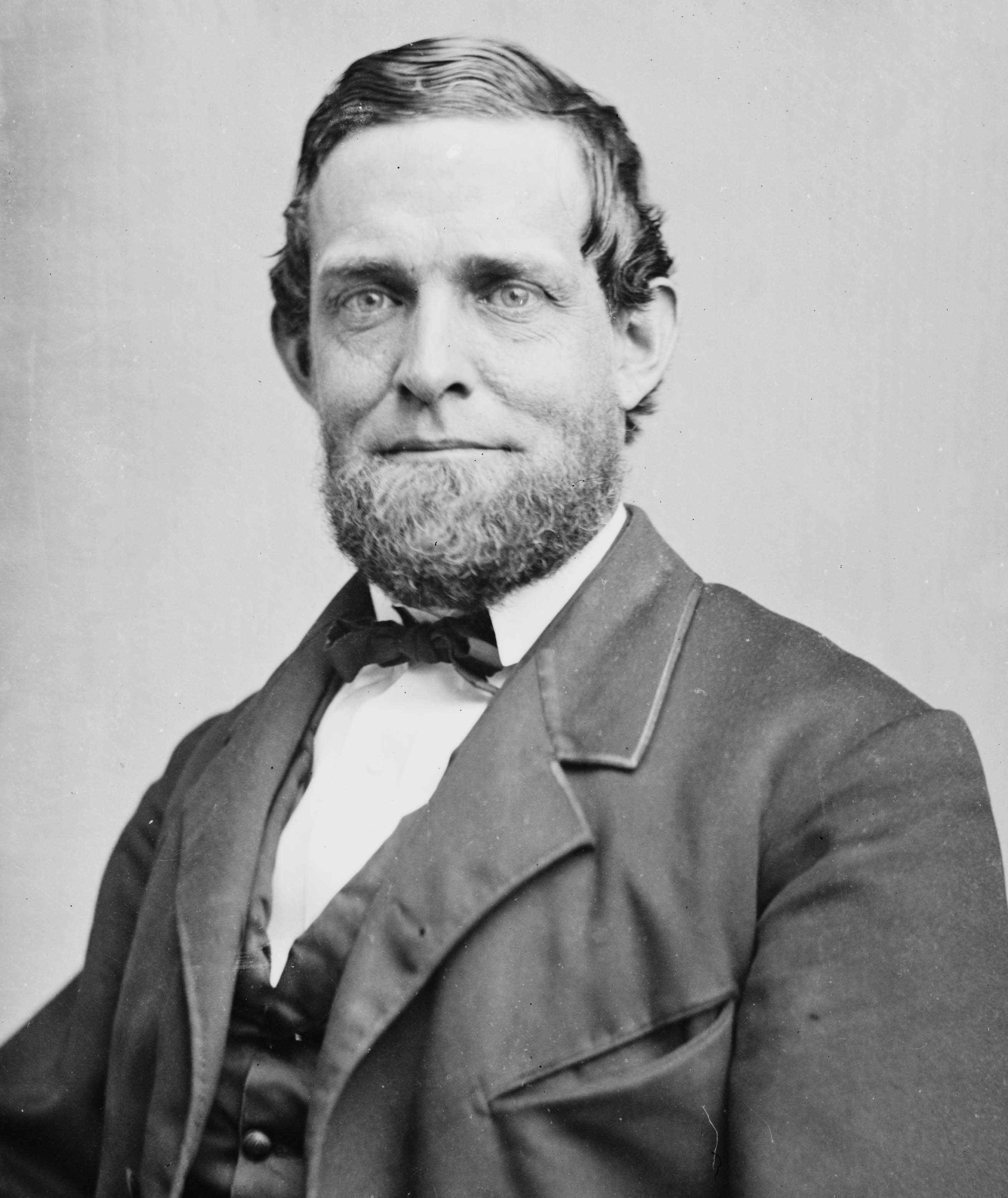
President of the Senate Schuyler Colfax

=== Senate ===
- President: Schuyler Colfax (R)
- President pro tempore: Henry B. Anthony (R)

=== House of Representatives ===
- Speaker: James G. Blaine (R)
- Republican Conference Chairman: Austin Blair

== Members ==
This list is arranged by chamber, then by state. Senators are listed in order of seniority, and representatives are listed by district.

Skip to House of Representatives, below

=== Senate ===
Senators were elected by the state legislatures every two years, with one-third beginning new six-year terms with each Congress. Preceding the names in the list below are Senate class numbers, which indicate the cycle of their election. In this Congress, Class 1 meant their term began in the last Congress, requiring re-election in 1874; Class 2 meant their term began in this Congress, requiring re-election in 1876; and Class 3 meant their term ended in this Congress, requiring re-election in 1872.

==== Alabama ====
▌2. George Goldthwaite (D)
▌3. George E. Spencer (R)

==== Arkansas ====
▌2. Powell Clayton (R)
▌3. Benjamin F. Rice (R)

==== California ====
▌1. Eugene Casserly (D)
▌3. Cornelius Cole (R)

==== Connecticut ====
▌1. William A. Buckingham (R)
▌3. Orris S. Ferry (R)

==== Delaware ====
▌1. Thomas F. Bayard Sr. (D)
▌2. Eli Saulsbury (D)

==== Florida ====
▌1. Abijah Gilbert (R)
▌3. Thomas W. Osborn (R)

==== Georgia ====
▌2. Thomas M. Norwood (D), from November 14, 1871
▌3. Joshua Hill (R)

==== Illinois ====
▌2. John A. Logan (R)
▌3. Lyman Trumbull (LR)

==== Indiana ====
▌1. Daniel D. Pratt (R)
▌3. Oliver H. P. T. Morton (R)

==== Iowa ====
▌2. George G. Wright (R)
▌3. James Harlan (R)

==== Kansas ====
▌2. Alexander Caldwell (R)
▌3. Samuel C. Pomeroy (R)

==== Kentucky ====
▌2. John W. Stevenson (D)
▌3. Garrett Davis (D), until September 22, 1872

▌Willis B. Machen (D), from September 27, 1872

==== Louisiana ====
▌2. J. Rodman West (R)
▌3. William P. Kellogg (R), until November 1, 1872

==== Maine ====
▌1. Hannibal Hamlin (R)
▌2. Lot M. Morrill (R)

==== Maryland ====
▌1. William T. Hamilton (D)
▌3. George Vickers (D)

==== Massachusetts ====
▌1. Charles Sumner (R)
▌2. Henry Wilson (R), until March 3, 1873

==== Michigan ====
▌1. Zachariah Chandler (R)
▌2. Thomas W. Ferry (R)

==== Minnesota ====
▌1. Alexander Ramsey (R)
▌2. William Windom (R)

==== Mississippi ====
▌1. Adelbert Ames (R)
▌2. James L. Alcorn (R), from December 1, 1871

==== Missouri ====
▌1. Carl Schurz (R)
▌3. Francis P. Blair Jr. (D)

==== Nebraska ====
▌1. Thomas Tipton (R)
▌2. Phineas Hitchcock (R)

==== Nevada ====
▌1. William M. Stewart (R)
▌3. James W. Nye (R)

==== New Hampshire ====
▌2. Aaron H. Cragin (R)
▌3. James W. Patterson (R)

==== New Jersey ====
▌1. John P. Stockton (D)
▌2. Frederick T. Frelinghuysen (R)

==== New York ====
▌1. Reuben E. Fenton (R)
▌3. Roscoe Conkling (R)

==== North Carolina ====
▌2. Matt W. Ransom (D), from January 30, 1872
▌3. John Pool (R)

==== Ohio ====
▌1. Allen G. Thurman (D)
▌3. John Sherman (R)

==== Oregon ====
▌2. James K. Kelly (D)
▌3. Henry W. Corbett (R)

==== Pennsylvania ====
▌1. John Scott (R)
▌3. Simon Cameron (R)

==== Rhode Island ====
▌1. William Sprague IV (R)
▌2. Henry B. Anthony (R)

==== South Carolina ====
▌2. Thomas J. Robertson (R)
▌3. Frederick A. Sawyer (R)

==== Tennessee ====
▌1. William G. Brownlow (R)
▌2. Henry Cooper (D)

==== Texas ====
▌1. James W. Flanagan (R)
▌2. Morgan C. Hamilton (R)

==== Vermont ====
▌1. George F. Edmunds (R)
▌3. Justin S. Morrill (R)

==== Virginia ====
▌1. John F. Lewis (R)
▌2. John W. Johnston (D), from March 15, 1871

==== West Virginia ====
▌1. Arthur I. Boreman (R)
▌2. Henry G. Davis (D)

==== Wisconsin ====
▌1. Matthew H. Carpenter (R)
▌3. Timothy O. Howe (R)

Senators' party membership by state at the opening of the 42nd Congress in March 1871. The green stripes in Illinois represent Liberal Republican Lyman Trumbull. 2 Democrats 1 Democrat and 1 Republican 2 Republicans Territories

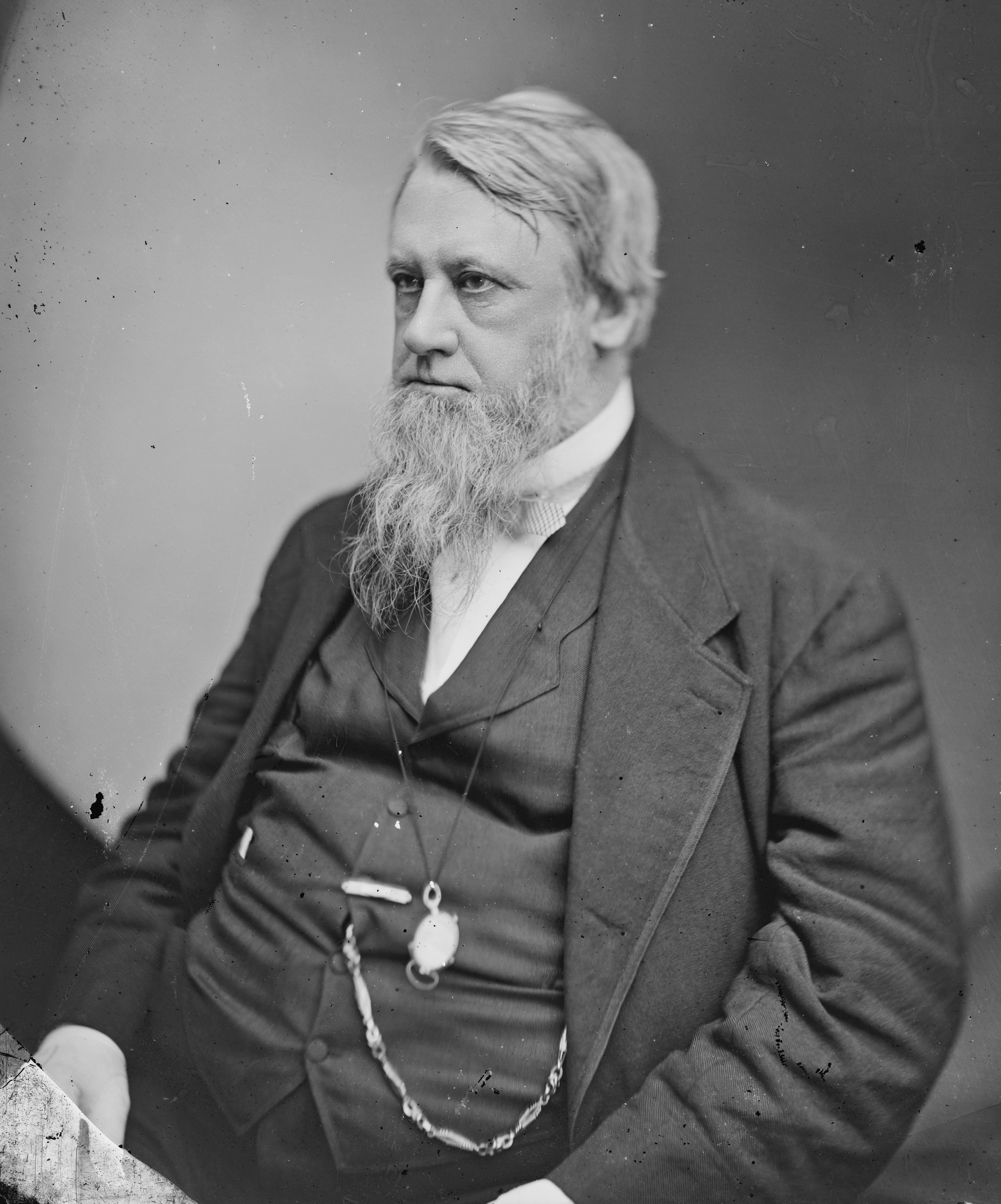
Senate President pro tempore Henry B. Anthony

=== House of Representatives ===
The names of representatives are preceded by their district numbers.

==== Alabama ====
▌1. Benjamin S. Turner (R)
▌2. Charles W. Buckley (R)
▌3. William A. Handley (D)
▌4. Charles Hays (R)
▌5. Peter M. Dox (D)
▌6. Joseph H. Sloss (D)

==== Arkansas ====
▌1. James M. Hanks (D)
▌2. Oliver P. Snyder (R)
▌3. John Edwards (LR), until February 9, 1872

▌Thomas Boles (R), from February 9, 1872

==== California ====
▌1. Sherman O. Houghton (R)
▌2. Aaron A. Sargent (R)
▌3. John M. Coghlan (R)

==== Connecticut ====
▌1. Julius L. Strong (R), until September 7, 1872

▌Joseph R. Hawley (R), from December 2, 1872

▌2. Stephen W. Kellogg (R)
▌3. Henry H. Starkweather (R)
▌4. William H. Barnum (D)

==== Delaware ====
▌At-large. Benjamin T. Biggs (D)

==== Florida ====
▌At-large. Josiah T. Walls (R), until January 29, 1873

▌Silas L. Niblack (D), from January 29, 1873

==== Georgia ====
▌1. Archibald T. MacIntyre (D)
▌2. Richard H. Whiteley (R)
▌3. John S. Bigby (R)
▌4. Thomas J. Speer (R), until August 18, 1872

▌Erasmus W. Beck (D), from December 2, 1872

▌5. Dudley M. Du Bose (D)
▌6. William P. Price (D)
▌7. Pierce M. B. Young (D)

==== Illinois ====
▌1. Charles B. Farwell (R)
▌2. John F. Farnsworth (R)
▌3. Horatio C. Burchard (R)
▌4. John B. Hawley (R)
▌5. Bradford N. Stevens (D)
▌6. Burton C. Cook (R), until August 26, 1871

▌Henry Snapp (R), from December 4, 1871

▌7. Jesse H. Moore (R)
▌8. James C. Robinson (D)
▌9. Thompson W. McNeely (D)
▌10. Edward Y. Rice (D)
▌11. Samuel S. Marshall (D)
▌12. John B. Hay (R)
▌13. John M. Crebs (D)
▌At-large. John L. Beveridge (R), November 7, 1871 – January 4, 1873

==== Indiana ====
▌1. William E. Niblack (D)
▌2. Michael C. Kerr (D)
▌3. William S. Holman (D)
▌4. Jeremiah M. Wilson (R)
▌5. John Coburn (R)
▌6. Daniel W. Voorhees (D)
▌7. Mahlon D. Manson (D)
▌8. James N. Tyner (R)
▌9. John P. C. Shanks (R)
▌10. William Williams (R)
▌11. Jasper Packard (R)

==== Iowa ====
▌1. George W. McCrary (R)
▌2. Aylett R. Cotton (R)
▌3. William G. Donnan (R)
▌4. Madison M. Walden (R)
▌5. Francis W. Palmer (R)
▌6. Jackson Orr (R)

==== Kansas ====
▌At-large. David P. Lowe (R)

==== Kentucky ====
▌1. Edward Crossland (D)
▌2. Henry D. McHenry (D)
▌3. Joseph H. Lewis (D)
▌4. William B. Read (D)
▌5. Boyd Winchester (D)
▌6. William E. Arthur (D)
▌7. James B. Beck (D)
▌8. George M. Adams (D)
▌9. John M. Rice (D)

==== Louisiana ====
▌1. J. Hale Sypher (R)
▌2. Lionel A. Sheldon (R)
▌3. Chester B. Darrall (R)
▌4. James McCleery (R), until November 5, 1871

▌Alexander Boarman (LR), from December 3, 1872

▌5. Frank Morey (R)

==== Maine ====
▌1. John Lynch (R)
▌2. William P. Frye (R)
▌3. James G. Blaine (R)
▌4. John A. Peters (R)
▌5. Eugene Hale (R)

==== Maryland ====
▌1. Samuel Hambleton (D)
▌2. Stevenson Archer (D)
▌3. Thomas Swann (D)
▌4. John Ritchie (D)
▌5. William M. Merrick (D)

==== Massachusetts ====
▌1. James Buffington (R)
▌2. Oakes Ames (R)
▌3. Ginery Twichell (R)
▌4. Samuel Hooper (R)
▌5. Benjamin F. Butler (R)
▌▌6. Nathaniel P. Banks (R) then (LR)
▌7. George M. Brooks (R), until May 13, 1872

▌Constantine C. Esty (R), from December 2, 1872

▌8. George F. Hoar (R)
▌9. William B. Washburn (R), until December 5, 1871

▌Alvah Crocker (R), from January 2, 1872

▌10. Henry L. Dawes (R)

==== Michigan ====
▌1. Henry Waldron (R)
▌2. William L. Stoughton (R)
▌3. Austin Blair (R)
▌4. Wilder D. Foster (R), from December 4, 1871
▌5. Omar D. Conger (R)
▌6. Jabez G. Sutherland (D)

==== Minnesota ====
▌1. Mark H. Dunnell (R)
▌2. John T. Averill (R)

==== Mississippi ====
▌1. George E. Harris (R)
▌2. Joseph L. Morphis (R)
▌3. Henry W. Barry (R)
▌4. George C. McKee (R)
▌5. Legrand W. Perce (R)

==== Missouri ====
▌1. Erastus Wells (D)
▌2. Gustavus A. Finkelnburg (LR)
▌3. James R. McCormick (D)
▌4. Harrison E. Havens (R)
▌5. Samuel S. Burdett (R)
▌6. Abram Comingo (D)
▌7. Isaac C. Parker (R)
▌8. James G. Blair (LR)
▌9. Andrew King (D)

==== Nebraska ====
▌At-large. John Taffe (R)

==== Nevada ====
▌At-large. Charles W. Kendall (D)

==== New Hampshire ====
▌1. Ellery A. Hibbard (D)
▌2. Samuel N. Bell (D)
▌3. Hosea W. Parker (D)

==== New Jersey ====
▌1. John W. Hazelton (R)
▌2. Samuel C. Forker (D)
▌3. John T. Bird (D)
▌4. John Hill (R)
▌5. George A. Halsey (R)

==== New York ====
▌1. Dwight Townsend (D)
▌2. Thomas Kinsella (D)
▌3. Henry W. Slocum (D)
▌4. Robert Roosevelt (D)
▌5. William R. Roberts (D)
▌6. Samuel S. Cox (D)
▌7. Smith Ely Jr. (D)
▌8. James Brooks (D)
▌9. Fernando Wood (D)
▌10. Clarkson N. Potter (D)
▌11. Charles St. John (R)
▌12. John H. Ketcham (R)
▌13. Joseph H. Tuthill (D)
▌14. Eli Perry (D)
▌15. Joseph M. Warren (D)
▌16. John Rogers (D)
▌17. William A. Wheeler (R)
▌18. John M. Carroll (D)
▌19. Elizur H. Prindle (R)
▌20. Clinton L. Merriam (R)
▌21. Ellis H. Roberts (R)
▌22. William E. Lansing (R)
▌23. R. Holland Duell (R)
▌24. John E. Seeley (R)
▌25. William H. Lamport (R)
▌26. Milo Goodrich (R)
▌27. H. Boardman Smith (R)
▌28. Freeman Clarke (R)
▌29. Seth Wakeman (R)
▌30. William Williams (D)
▌31. Walter L. Sessions (R)

==== North Carolina ====
▌1. Clinton L. Cobb (R)
▌2. Charles R. Thomas (R)
▌3. Alfred M. Waddell (D)
▌4. Sion H. Rogers (D)
▌5. James M. Leach (D)
▌6. Francis E. Shober (D)
▌7. James C. Harper (D)

==== Ohio ====
▌1. Aaron F. Perry (R), until July 14, 1872

▌Ozro J. Dodds (D), from October 9, 1872

▌2. Job E. Stevenson (R)
▌3. Lewis D. Campbell (D)
▌4. John F. McKinney (D)
▌5. Charles N. Lamison (D)
▌6. John A. Smith (R)
▌7. Samuel Shellabarger (R)
▌8. John Beatty (R)
▌9. Charles Foster (R)
▌10. Erasmus D. Peck (R)
▌11. John T. Wilson (R)
▌12. Philadelph Van Trump (D)
▌13. George W. Morgan (D)
▌14. James Monroe (R)
▌15. William P. Sprague (R)
▌16. John Bingham (R)
▌17. Jacob A. Ambler (R)
▌18. William H. Upson (R)
▌19. James A. Garfield (R)

==== Oregon ====
▌At-large. James H. Slater (D)

==== Pennsylvania ====
▌1. Samuel J. Randall (D)
▌2. John V. Creely (IR)
▌3. Leonard Myers (R)
▌4. William D. Kelley (R)
▌5. Alfred C. Harmer (R)
▌6. Ephraim L. Acker (D)
▌7. Washington Townsend (R)
▌8. J. Lawrence Getz (D)
▌9. Oliver J. Dickey (R)
▌10. John W. Killinger (R)
▌11. John B. Storm (D)
▌12. Lazarus D. Shoemaker (R)
▌13. Ulysses Mercur (R), until December 2, 1872

▌Frank C. Bunnell (R), from December 24, 1872

▌14. John B. Packer (R)
▌15. Richard J. Haldeman (D)
▌16. Benjamin F. Meyers (D)
▌17. R. Milton Speer (D)
▌18. Henry Sherwood (D)
▌19. Glenni W. Scofield (R)
▌20. Samuel Griffith (D)
▌21. Henry D. Foster (D)
▌22. James S. Negley (R)
▌23. Ebenezer McJunkin (R)
▌24. William McClelland (D)

==== Rhode Island ====
▌1. Benjamin T. Eames (R)
▌2. James M. Pendleton (R)

==== South Carolina ====
▌1. Joseph Rainey (R)
▌2. Robert C. De Large (R), until January 24, 1873; vacant thereafter
▌3. Robert B. Elliott (R)
▌4. Alexander S. Wallace (R)

==== Tennessee ====
▌1. Roderick R. Butler (R)
▌2. Horace Maynard (R)
▌3. Abraham E. Garrett (D)
▌4. John M. Bright (D)
▌5. Edward I. Golladay (D)
▌6. Washington C. Whitthorne (D)
▌7. Robert P. Caldwell (D)
▌8. William W. Vaughan (D)

==== Texas ====
▌1. William S. Herndon (D)
▌2. John C. Conner (D)
▌3. William T. Clark (R), until May 13, 1872

▌Dewitt C. Giddings (D), from May 13, 1872

▌4. John Hancock (D)

==== Vermont ====
▌1. Charles W. Willard (R)
▌2. Luke P. Poland (R)
▌3. Worthington C. Smith (R)

==== Virginia ====
▌1. John Critcher (D)
▌2. James H. Platt Jr. (R)
▌3. Charles H. Porter (R)
▌4. William H. H. Stowell (R)
▌5. Richard T. W. Duke (D)
▌6. John T. Harris (D)
▌7. Elliott M. Braxton (D)
▌8. William Terry (D)

==== West Virginia ====
▌1. John J. Davis (D)
▌2. James C. McGrew (R)
▌3. Frank Hereford (D)

==== Wisconsin ====
▌1. Alexander Mitchell (D)
▌2. Gerry W. Hazelton (R)
▌3. J. Allen Barber (R)
▌4. Charles A. Eldredge (D)
▌5. Philetus Sawyer (R)
▌6. Jeremiah M. Rusk (R)

==== Non-voting members ====
▌Arizona Territory. Richard C. McCormick (D)
▌Colorado Territory. Jerome B. Chaffee (R)
▌Dakota Territory. Moses K. Armstrong (D)
▌District of Columbia. Norton P. Chipman (R), from April 21, 1871
▌Idaho Territory. Samuel A. Merritt (D)
▌Montana Territory. William H. Clagett (R)
▌New Mexico Territory. José Manuel Gallegos (D)
▌Utah Territory. William H. Hooper (D)
▌Washington Territory. Selucius Garfielde (R)
▌Wyoming Territory. William T. Jones (R)

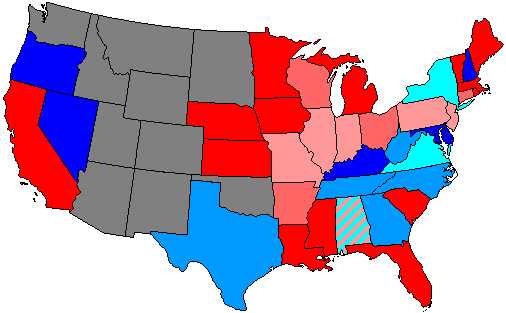
House seats by party holding plurality in state: 80+% to 100% Democratic / 80+% to 100% Republican; 60+% to 80% Democratic / 60+% to 80% Republican; Up to 60% Democratic / Up to 60% Republican

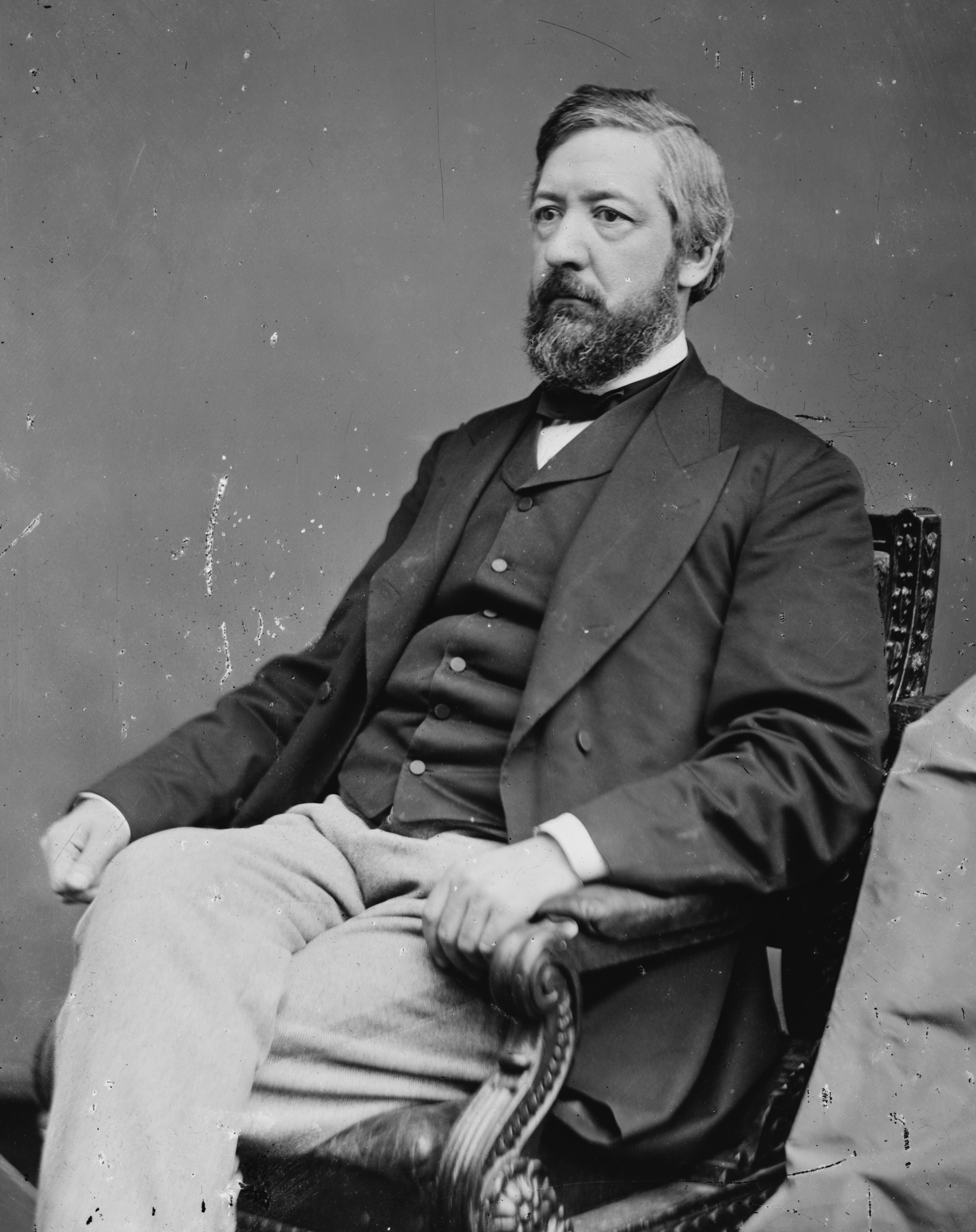
Speaker of the House James G. Blaine

== Changes in membership ==
The count below reflects changes from the beginning of the first session of this Congress.

=== Senate ===
- Replacements: 0
  - Democratic: no net change
  - Republican: no net change
- Deaths: 0
- Resignations: 2
- Contested elections: 0
- Total seats with changes: 4

Senate changes
State (class)	Vacated by	Reason for change	Successor	Date of successor's formal installation (Note: When seated or oath administered, not necessarily when service began.)
Virginia (2)	Vacant	Legislature had failed to elect. Previous incumbent re-elected March 15, 1871.	John W. Johnston (D)	March 15, 1871
Georgia (2)	Vacant	Foster Blodgett presented credentials as Senator-elect, but the Senate declared him not elected. Successor elected November 14, 1871.	Thomas M. Norwood (D)	November 14, 1871
Mississippi (2)	Vacant	Delayed taking seat in order to serve as Governor of Mississippi	James L. Alcorn (R)	December 1, 1871
North Carolina (2)	Vacant	Legislature had failed to elect. Successor elected January 30, 1872.	Matt W. Ransom (D)	January 30, 1872
Kentucky (3)	Garrett Davis (D)	Died September 22, 1872. Successor appointed September 27, 1872. Appointee was later elected January 21, 1873, to finish the term.	Willis B. Machen (D)	September 27, 1872
Louisiana (3)	William P. Kellogg (R)	Resigned November 1, 1872, after being elected Governor of Louisiana	Vacant	Not filled this Congress
Massachusetts (2)	Henry Wilson (R)	Resigned March 3, 1873, after being elected U.S. Vice President	Vacant	Not filled this Congress

=== House of Representatives ===
- Replacements: 11
  - Democratic: 4 seat net gain
  - Republican: 5 seat net loss
  - Liberal Republican: 1 seat net gain
- Deaths: 3
- Resignations: 6
- Contested election: 4
- Total seats with changes: 16

House changes
District	Vacated by	Reason for change	Successor	Date of successor's formal installation
District of Columbia At-large	New seat	District of Columbia's At-large district created March 4, 1871, and remained vacant until April 21, 1871	Norton P. Chipman (R)	April 21, 1871
Illinois At-large	Vacant	Rep. John A. Logan resigned at the end of the previous congress after being elected to the US Senate	John L. Beveridge (R)	November 7, 1871
Michigan 4th	Vacant	Rep. Thomas W. Ferry resigned at the end of the previous congress after being elected to the US Senate	Wilder D. Foster (R)	December 4, 1871
Illinois 6th	Burton C. Cook (R)	Resigned August 26, 1871	Henry Snapp (R)	December 4, 1871
Louisiana 4th	James McCleery (R)	Died November 5, 1871	Alexander Boarman (LR)	December 3, 1872
Massachusetts 9th	William B. Washburn (R)	Resigned December 5, 1871, after being elected Governor of Massachusetts	Alvah Crocker (R)	January 2, 1872
Arkansas 3rd	John Edwards (LR)	Lost contested election February 9, 1872	Thomas Boles (R)	February 9, 1872
Massachusetts 7th	George M. Brooks (R)	Resigned May 13, 1872, after becoming judge of probate for Middlesex County	Constantine C. Esty (R)	December 2, 1872
Texas 3rd	William T. Clark (R)	Lost contested election May 13, 1872	Dewitt C. Giddings (D)	December 13, 1872
Ohio 1st	Aaron F. Perry (R)	Resigned July 14, 1872	Ozro J. Dodds (D)	October 9, 1872
Georgia 4th	Thomas J. Speer (R)	Died August 18, 1872	Erasmus W. Beck (D)	December 2, 1872
Connecticut 1st	Julius L. Strong (R)	Died September 7, 1872	Joseph R. Hawley (R)	December 2, 1872
Pennsylvania 13th	Ulysses Mercur (R)	Resigned December 2, 1872, after becoming an assoc. justice of the Supreme Court of Pennsylvania	Frank C. Bunnell (R)	December 24, 1872
Illinois At-large	John L. Beveridge (R)	Resigned January 4, 1873, after being elected Lieutenant Governor of Illinois	Vacant	Not filled this term
South Carolina 2nd	Robert C. De Large (R)	Seat declared vacant January 24, 1873, after election was contested by Christopher C. Bowen	Vacant	Not filled this term
Florida At-large	Josiah T. Walls (R)	Lost contested election January 29, 1873	Silas L. Niblack (D)	January 29, 1873

== Committees ==
Lists of committees and their party leaders for members of the House and Senate committees can be found through the Official Congressional Directory at the bottom of this article. The directory after the pages of terms of service lists committees of the Senate, House (Standing with Subcommittees, Select and Special) and Joint and, after that, House/Senate committee assignments. On the committees section of the House and Senate in the Official Congressional Directory, the committee's members on the first row on the left side shows the chairman of the committee and on the right side shows the ranking member of the committee.

=== Senate ===
- Agriculture (Chairman: Frederick T. Frelinghuysen; Ranking Member: Henry G. Davis)
- Appropriations (Chairman: Lot M. Morrill; Ranking Member: William Windom)
- Audit and Control the Contingent Expenses of the Senate (Chairman: Matthew H. Carpenter; Ranking Member: Eli Saulsbury)
- Civil Service and Retrenchment (Chairman: George G. Wright; Ranking Member: N/A)
- Claims (Chairman: John Scott; Ranking Member: Arthur I. Boreman)
- Commerce (Chairman: Zachariah Chandler; Ranking Member: William A. Buckingham)
- Distributing Public Revenue Among the States (Select)
- District of Columbia (Chairman: John F. Lewis; Ranking Member: Frederick A. Sawyer)
- Education and Labor (Chairman: James W. Flanagan; Ranking Member: James W. Patterson)
- Engrossed Bills (Chairman: Thomas F. Bayard; Ranking Member: Thomas M. Norwood)
- Finance (Chairman: John Sherman; Ranking Member: Adelbert Ames)
- Foreign Relations (Chairman: Simon Cameron; Ranking Member: Carl Schurz)
- Indian Affairs (Chairman: William A. Buckingham; Ranking Member: Henry Wilson)
- Investigation and Retrenchment (Chairman: William A. Buckingham; Ranking Member; William M. Stewart)
- Judiciary (Chairman: George F. Edmunds; Ranking Member: Frederick T. Frelinghuysen)
- Manufactures (Chairman: Thomas J. Robertson; Ranking Member: Abijah Gilbert)
- Military Affairs (Chairman: John A. Logan; Ranking Member: John A. Logan)
- Mines and Mining (Chairman: Hannibal Hamlin; Ranking Member: Alexander Caldwell)
- Mississippi River Levee System (Select)
- Naval Affairs (Chairman: Aaron H. Cragin; Ranking Member: Thomas W. Ferry)
- Ordnance and War Ships (Select)
- Outrages in Southern States (Select)
- Pacific Railroad (Chairman: William M. Stewart; Ranking Member: William P. Kellogg)
- Patents (Chairman: Orris S. Ferry; Ranking Member: William Windom)
- Pensions (Chairman: Daniel D. Pratt; Ranking Member: Morgan C. Hamilton)
- Post Office and Post Roads (Chairman: Alexander Ramsey; Ranking Member: Hannibal Hamlin)
- Private Land Claims (Chairman: Allen G. Thurman; Ranking Member: Thomas F. Bayard)
- Privileges and Elections (Chairman: Oliver P. Morton; Ranking Member: Joshua Hill)
- Public Buildings and Grounds (Chairman: Justin S. Morrill; Ranking Member: Cornelius Cole)
- Public Lands (Chairman: William Sprague; Ranking Member: William Windom)
- Railroads (Chairman: William M. Stewart; Ranking Member: N/A)
- Removal of Political Disabilities (Select)
- Retrenchment
- Revision of the Laws (Chairman: Hannibal Hamlin; Ranking Member: George G. Wright)
- Revolutionary Claims (Chairman: William G. Brownlow; Ranking Member: Joshua Hill)
- Rules (Select)
- Tariff Regulation (Select)
- Territories (Chairman: Arthur I. Boreman; Ranking Member: Phineas W. Hitchcock)
- Transportation Routes to the Seaboard (Select)
- Whole

=== House of Representatives ===
- Accounts (Chairman: James Buffington; Ranking Member: Stevenson Archer)
- Agriculture (Chairman: Charles Hays; Ranking Member: John W. Hazelton)
- Appropriations (Chairman: James A. Garfield; Ranking Member: Eugene Hale)
- Alabama Affairs (Select)
- Arkansas Affairs (Select)
- Banking and Currency (Chairman: Horace Maynard; Ranking Member: Clinton L. Merriam)
- Claims (Chairman: John B. Hawley; Ranking Member: William P. Frye)
- Coinage, Weights and Measures (Chairman: Samuel Hooper; Ranking Member: John Critcher)
- Commerce (Chairman: William A. Wheeler; Ranking Member: James S. Negley)
- District of Columbia (Chairman: Alfred C. Harmer; Ranking Member: Aylett R. Cotton)
- Education and Labor (Chairman: James Monroe; Ranking Member: Robert B. Elliott)
- Elections (Chairman: Horace B. Smith; Ranking Member: Benjamin T. Eames)
- Expenditures in the Interior Department (Chairman: Jackson Orr; Ranking Member: George M. Adams)
- Expenditures in the Justice Department (Chairman: James B. Sener; Ranking Member: N/A)
- Expenditures in the Navy Department (Chairman: Julius C. Burrows; Ranking Member: Benjamin T. Biggs)
- Expenditures in the Post Office Department (Chairman: Henry W. Barry; Ranking Member: William R. Roberts)
- Expenditures in the State Department (Chairman: Jasper Packard; Ranking Member: John Rogers)
- Expenditures in the Treasury Department (Chairman: J. Hale Sypher; Ranking Member: William H. Barnum)
- Expenditures in the War Department (Chairman: William Williams; Ranking Member: Ephraim L. Acker)
- Expenditures on Public Buildings (Chairman: R. Holland Duell; Ranking Member: Fernando Wood)
- Freedmen's Affairs (Chairman: Clinton L. Cobb; Ranking Member: Joseph H. Rainey)
- Foreign Affairs (Chairman: Godlove Stein Orth; Ranking Member: Jasper Packard)
- Indian Affairs (Chairman: John T. Averill; Ranking Member: John C. Edwards)
- Invalid Pensions (Chairman: Jeremiah McLain Rusk; Ranking Member: Benjamin S. Turner)
- Judiciary (Chairman: Benjamin F. Butler; Ranking Member: Milo Goodrich)
- Manufactures (Chairman: Charles B. Farwell; Ranking Member: John M. Rice)
- Mileage (Chairman: Hezekiah S. Bundy; Ranking Member: Edward I. Golladay)
- Military Affairs (Chairman: John Coburn; Ranking Member: George E. Harris)
- Militia (Chairman: Roderick R. Butler; Ranking Member: John C. Conner)
- Mines and Mining (Chairman: David P. Lowe; Ranking Member: Walter L. Sessions)
- Naval Affairs (Chairman: Glenni W. Scofield; Ranking Member: John M. Coghlan)
- Pacific Railroads (Chairman: Philetus Sawyer; Ranking Member: John T. Averill)
- Patents (Chairman: Omar D. Conger; Ranking Member: Joseph M. Warren)
- Post Office and Post Roads (Chairman: John B. Packer; Ranking Member: Charles H. Porter)
- Private Land Claims (Chairman: Jasper Packard; Ranking Member: J. Allen Barber)
- Public Buildings and Grounds (Chairman: James H. Platt Jr.; Ranking Member: Walter L. Sessions)
- Public Expenditures (Chairman: Harrison E. Havens; Ranking Member: Thomas Kinsella)
- Public Lands (Chairman: Washington Townsend; Ranking Member: Jeremiah M. Rusk)
- Railways and Canals (Chairman: George W. McCrary; Ranking Member: Charles St. John
- Reform on Civil Service (Chairman: Stephen W. Kellogg; Ranking Member: N/A)
- Revision of Laws (Chairman: Luke P. Poland; Ranking Member: John S. Bigby)
- Revolution Claims (Chairman: Alexander S. Wallace; Ranking Member: Abram Comingo)
- Revolutionary Pensions and War of 1812 (Chairman: Lazarus D. Shoemaker; Ranking Member: John M. Rice)
- Rules (Select) (Chairman: James G. Blaine; Ranking Member: Samuel S. Cox)
- Standards of Official Conduct
- Territories (Chairman: George C. McKee; Ranking Member: Lazarus D. Shoemaker)
- War Claims (Chairman: William Lawrence; Ranking Member: N/A)
- Ways and Means (Chairman: Henry L. Dawes; Ranking Member: Horatio C. Burchard)
- Whole

=== Joint committees ===
- Conditions of Indian Tribes (Special)
- Enrolled Bills (Chairman: Rep. Chester B. Darrall; Vice Chairman: Rep. John T. Bird)
- Inquire into the Affairs of the District of Columbia (Select) (Chairman: Rep. Jeremiah M. Wilson; Vice Chairman: N/A)
- The Library (Chairman: Rep. William P. Frye; Vice Chairman: Rep. Lewis D. Campbell)
- Printing (Chairman: Rep. William G. Donnan; Vice Chairman: Rep. William P. Price)

== Caucuses ==
- Democratic (House)
- Democratic (Senate)

== Employees ==
=== Legislative branch agency directors ===
- Architect of the Capitol: Edward Clark
- Librarian of Congress: Ainsworth Rand Spofford

=== Senate ===
- Chaplain: John P. Newman (Methodist)
- Librarian: George S. Wagner, from 1871
- Secretary: George C. Gorham
- Sergeant at Arms: John R. French

=== House of Representatives ===
- Chaplain: John G. Butler (Presbyterian)
- Clerk: Edward McPherson
- Clerk at the Speaker's Table: John M. Barclay
- Doorkeeper: Otis S. Buxton
- Postmaster: William S. King
- Reading Clerks: Charles N. Clisbee (D) and William K. Mehaffey (R)
- Sergeant at Arms: Nehemiah G. Ordway

== See also ==
- 1870 United States elections (elections leading to this Congress)
  - 1870–71 United States Senate elections
  - 1870–71 United States House of Representatives elections
- 1872 United States elections (elections during this Congress, leading to the next Congress)
  - 1872 United States presidential election
  - 1872–73 United States Senate elections
  - 1872–73 United States House of Representatives elections
