= Nathaniel Greene Foster =

American politician

Nathaniel Greene Foster (August 25, 1809 – October 19, 1869) was an American politician, lawyer, and military officer.

Foster was born near Madison in Morgan County, Georgia in 1809. He graduated from the University of Georgia in Athens in 1830 with a Bachelor of Arts (AB) degree. Foster studied law, gained admittance to the state bar in 1831, and began practicing law in Madison.

During the Seminole War, Foster served as the captain of a company of men. On March 3, 1838, he was elected the solicitor general of the Ocmulgee circuit and served in that position until his resignation on October 3, 1840. Foster was elected to the Georgia House of Representatives in 1840 and the Georgia Senate from 1841 through 1843. He was re-elected to that latter body two additional times in 1851 and 1852.

Foster was elected to U.S. House of Representatives in 1854 as a member of the American Party and served one term. During that time, he became ordained pastor in the Baptist Church. After his congressional service, he served as a judge in the Ocmulgee circuit from September 30, 1867, until his resignation in 1868 due to poor health. Foster died the next year on October 19, 1869, in Madison and was buried in that city's Madison Cemetery.

U.S. House of Representatives
Preceded by David Addison Reese	Member of the U.S. House of Representatives from Georgia's 7th congressional district March 4, 1855 – March 3, 1857	Succeeded by Joshua Hill
