= Senator Rees =

Senator Rees may refer to:

- Edward Herbert Rees (1886–1969), Kansas State Senate
- Thomas M. Rees (1925–2003), California State Senate

== See also ==
- Senator Reese (disambiguation)
