= 1884 Arkansas gubernatorial election =

- September 1, 1884
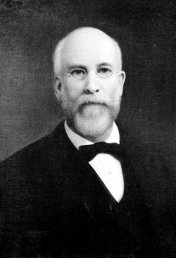

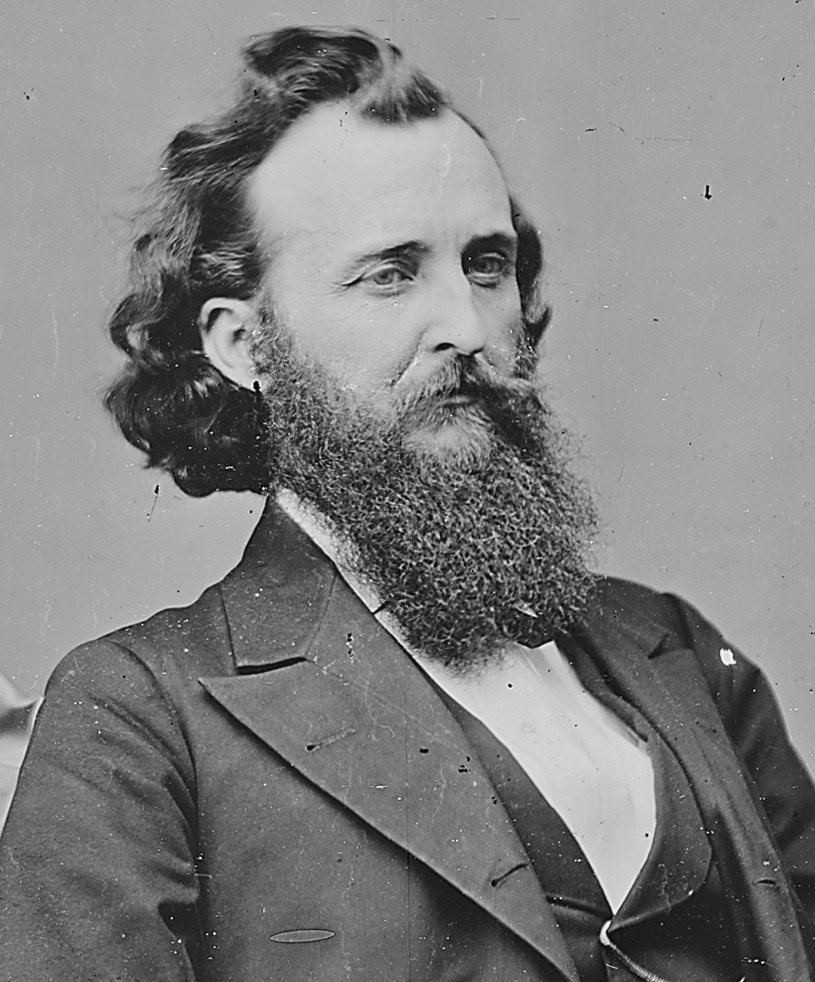
| Nominee | Simon Pollard Hughes Jr. | Thomas Boles |
| Party | Democratic | Republican |
| Popular vote | 100,875 | 55,388 |
| Percentage | 64.56% | 35.44% |
- County results Hughes: 50–60% 60–70% 70–80% 80–90% >90% Boles: 50–60% 60–70% 70–80% 80–90%
Governor before election
James H. Berry
Democratic
Elected Governor
Simon Pollard Hughes Jr.
Democratic

The 1884 Arkansas gubernatorial election was held on September 1, 1884, in order to elect the Governor of Arkansas. Democratic nominee and former member of the Arkansas House of Representatives from Monroe County Simon Pollard Hughes Jr. defeated Republican nominee and former member of the U.S. House of Representatives from Arkansas's 3rd district Thomas Boles.

== General election ==
On election day, September 1, 1884, Democratic nominee Simon Pollard Hughes Jr. won the election by a margin of 45,487 votes against his opponent Republican nominee Thomas Boles, thereby retaining Democratic control over the office of Governor. Hughes was sworn in as the 15th Governor of Arkansas on January 17, 1885.

=== Results ===
1884 Arkansas gubernatorial election
| Party | Candidate | Votes | % |
|---|---|---|---|
| Democratic | Simon Pollard Hughes Jr. | 100,875 | 64.56 |
| Republican | Thomas Boles | 55,388 | 35.44 |
| Total votes | | 156,263 | 100.00 |
| Democratic hold | | | |
