= Homer V. M. Miller =

American politician from Georgia and the Confederacy (1814-1896)

Homer Virgil Milton Miller
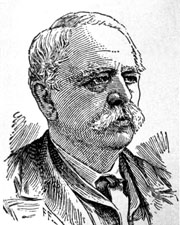

United States Senator from Georgia
- In office February 24, 1871 – March 3, 1871
- Preceded by: Robert Toombs
- Succeeded by: Thomas M. Norwood

Personal details
- Born: April 29, 1814 Pendleton, South Carolina
- Died: May 31, 1896 (aged 82) Atlanta, Georgia
- Party: Democratic

Military service
- Allegiance: Confederate States of America
- Branch/service: Confederate States Army
- Battles/wars: American Civil War

Homer Virgil Milton Miller (April 29, 1814 – May 31, 1896) was an American physician and politician from the U.S. state of Georgia, who practiced medicine for the Confederacy in the American Civil War and served as a U.S. senator from Georgia for seven days in 1871.

Born in Pendleton, South Carolina on April 29, 1814, Miller moved with his parents to Rabun County, Georgia in 1820. He attended the common schools and graduated from the Medical College of South Carolina in 1835. He continued medical studies in Paris and commenced practice in Cassville, Georgia, in 1838. Miller was an unsuccessful Whig candidate for election in the 5th Congressional District as a U.S. representative to the twenty-ninth United States Congress in 1844.

Miller was an enslaver. In 1840, he owned 10 slaves. In 1850, he owned 3 slaves. In 1860, he owned 20 slaves.

During the Civil War, Miller served in the Confederate army as a surgeon and as a medical director, surgeon of posts, and inspector of hospitals in Georgia. He resumed the practice of medicine in Rome, Georgia and was a member of the faculty of the Atlanta Medical College. Subsequently, he was trustee of the University of Georgia in Athens.

During the Reconstruction Era, Miller was a member of Georgia's Constitutional Convention in 1867, representing the 35th Election District. Upon the restoration of Georgia's congressional representation in 1868, Miller was elected as a Democrat to the U.S. Senate on July 28, 1868. However, he did not qualify (and thus was not seated) until February 24, 1871. He served until the end of his term on March 3, 1871.

Miller's tenure in the Senate, at a mere seven days long, ranks (as of 2026) as one of the shortest in American history and the shortest for those who won a full term.

Miller died in Atlanta on May 31, 1896, and was interred in Myrtle Hill Cemetery in Rome, Georgia.

U.S. Senate
Preceded by Robert Toombs^{(1)}	U.S. senator (Class 2) from Georgia; February 24, 1871 – March 3, 1871; Served alongside: Joshua Hill	Succeeded by Thomas M. Norwood
Notes and references
1. Because of Georgia's secession, the Senate seat was vacant for ten years before Miller succeeded Toombs.
