= 18th Iowa Infantry Regiment =

- Iowa state flag
- Active: August 6, 1862, to July 21, 1865
- Country: United States
- Allegiance: Union
- Branch: Infantry
- Equipment: .68 cal. Austrian Rifles
- Engagements: American Civil War; Trans-Mississippi theater; Second Battle of Springfield; Battle of Prairie D'Ane

The 18th Iowa Infantry Regiment was an infantry regiment that served in the Union Army during the American Civil War.

== Service ==
The 18th Iowa Infantry was organized at Clinton, Iowa, and mustered in for three years of Federal service on August 6, 1862.

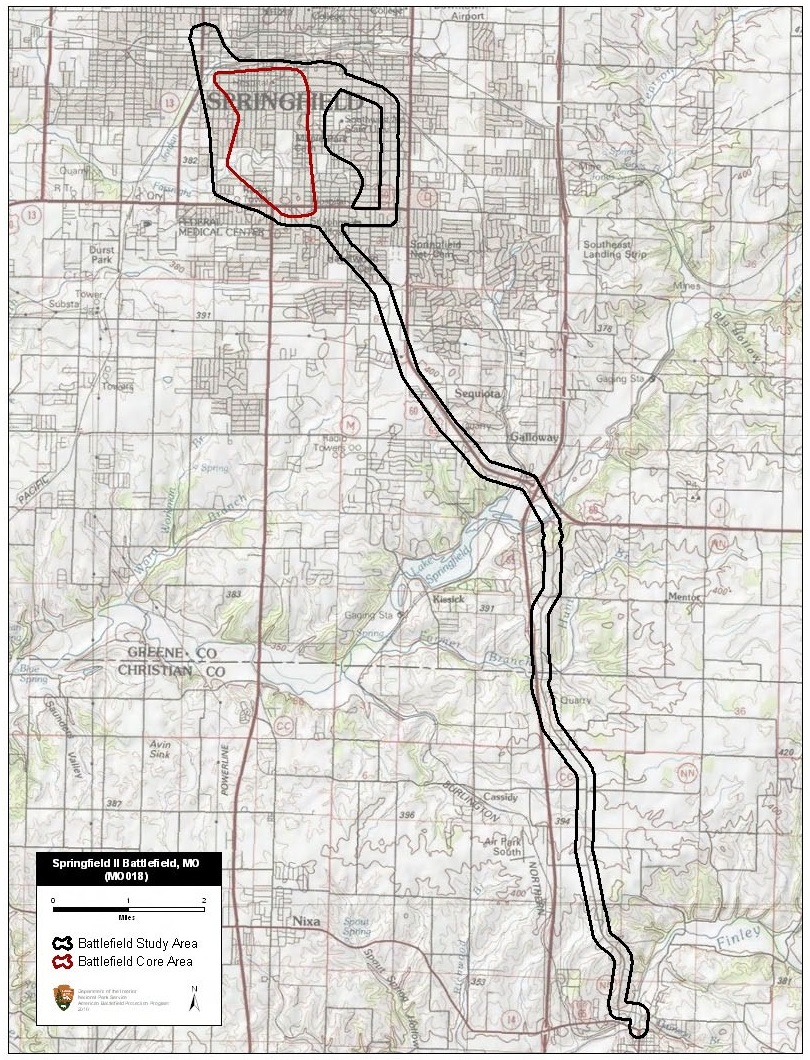
Map of Springfield II Battlefield core and study areas by the American Battlefield Protection Program.

The regiment was ordered to Missouri, marching into Springfield and joining the Army of the Southwest. On January 7, 1863, the regiment received intelligence that confederates were marching towards Springfield. By the afternoon, gunfire increased and eventually turned into a battle. The 3rd and 4th Missouri Cavalry Regiment charged to the right of the confederates, inflicting severe injuries. After around an hour, the confederates advanced to the right of the union, captured the area. The confederates then captured an academy, being used as a prison, to the left.

The regiment was mustered out on July 20, 1865.

== Total strength and casualties ==
The 18th Iowa mustered 1127 men at one time or another during its existence. It suffered 2 officers and 33 enlisted men who were killed in action or who died of their wounds and 1 officer and 131 enlisted men who died of disease, for a total of 167 fatalities. 79 were wounded.

== Commanders ==
- Colonel John Edwards
- Colonel Hugh J. Campbell

== See also ==
- List of Iowa Civil War Units
- Iowa in the American Civil War
