= Thomas Boles =

American politician (1837–1905)

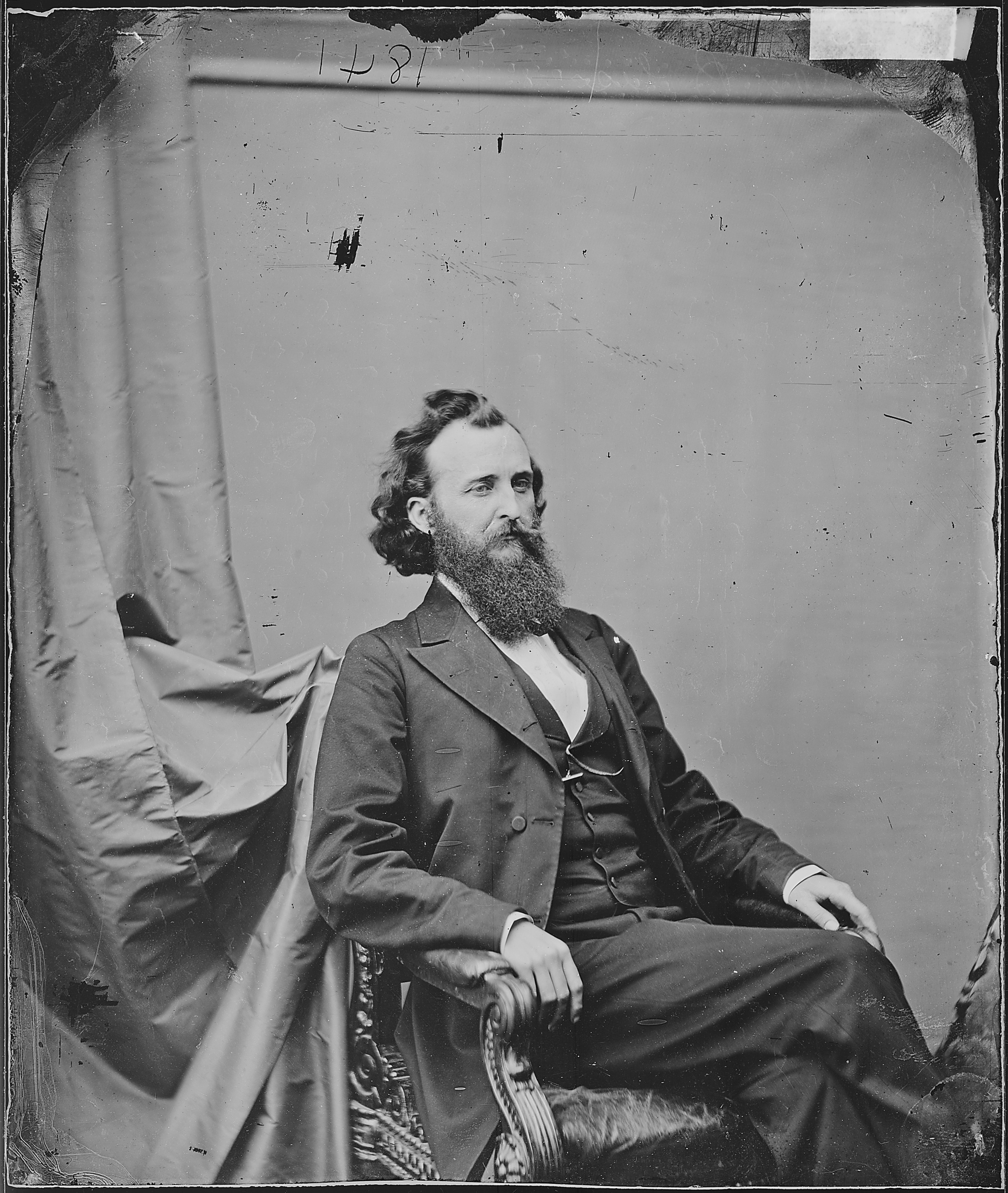

Member of the U.S. House of Representatives from Arkansas's 3rd district
- In office February 9, 1872 – March 3, 1873
- Preceded by: John Edwards
- Succeeded by: William W. Wilshire
- In office June 22, 1868 – March 3, 1871
- Preceded by: District established
- Succeeded by: John Edwards

Personal details
- Born: July 16, 1837 Clarksville, Arkansas, U.S.
- Died: March 13, 1905 (aged 67) Fort Smith, Arkansas, U.S.
- Party: Republican
- Spouses: Catherine Frances Keith Boles; Julia Elizabeth Pound Boles

Military service
- Allegiance: United States of America
- Branch/service: Union Army
- Rank: Captain
- Unit: Company E, Third Regiment, Arkansas Volunteer Cavalry
- Battles/wars: American Civil War

Thomas Boles (July 16, 1837 – March 13, 1905) was an American lawyer, politician, judge, and U.S. Representative, federal marshal, and court clerk from Arkansas. He served in the Union Army during the American Civil War. He was a Republican.

== Biography ==
Born near Clarksville, Arkansas, Boles attended the common schools and taught school for several years.

== Career ==
Boles was a deputy sheriff in Yell County, Arkansas in 1858 and deputy clerk of the circuit court of Yell County in 1859 and 1860. He studied law and was admitted to the bar in 1860 whereupon he commenced practice in Danville, Arkansas.

During the American Civil War, Boles served on the Union side as captain of Company E, Third Regiment, Arkansas Volunteer Cavalry from 1863 until 1864. After the war he served as judge of the fourth judicial circuit from 1865 until April 20, 1868, when he resigned.

Upon the readmission of Arkansas to representation Boles was elected as a Republican to the Fortieth Congress and was reelected to the Forty-first Congress, serving from June 22, 1868, until March 3, 1871. He successfully contested the election of John Edwards to the Forty-second Congress and again served from February 9, 1872, until March 3, 1873, but he was not a candidate for renomination in 1872.

Boles resumed the practice of law at Dardanelle, Arkansas and also served many years as school director and alderman. He was appointed receiver of the land office at Dardanelle by President Rutherford B. Hayes in February 1878. He then served as a United States marshal for the western district of Arkansas from 1881 until 1889. In 1884, Boles was the Republican nominee for Governor. Receiving approximately 35%, he was defeated. He was a delegate to every Republican State convention from the organization of the party until his death. He also served as clerk of the United States Circuit Court for the Eighth Judicial Circuit from September 1897 until his death.

== Death ==
Boles died in Fort Smith, Sebastian County, Arkansas, on March 13, 1905. He is interred at Brearley Cemetery, Dardanelle, Arkansas.

Party political offices
Preceded by W. D. Slack	Republican nominee for Governor of Arkansas; 1884	Succeeded by Lafayette Gregg
U.S. House of Representatives
Preceded by District created	Member of the U.S. House of Representatives from Arkansas's 3rd congressional district June 22, 1868 – March 3, 1871	Succeeded by John Edwards
Preceded by John Edwards	Member of the U.S. House of Representatives from Arkansas's 3rd congressional district February 9, 1872 – March 3, 1873	Succeeded by William W. Wilshire
