= David A. Reese =

American politician (1794–1871)

David Addison Reese

Member of the U.S. House of Representatives from Georgia's 7th district
- In office March 4, 1853 – March 3, 1855
- Preceded by: Alexander Stephens
- Succeeded by: Nathaniel Greene Foster

Personal details
- Born: March 3, 1794 Charlotte, North Carolina, U.S.
- Died: December 16, 1871 (aged 77) Auburn, Alabama, U.S.
- Party: Whig
- Education: Jefferson Medical College
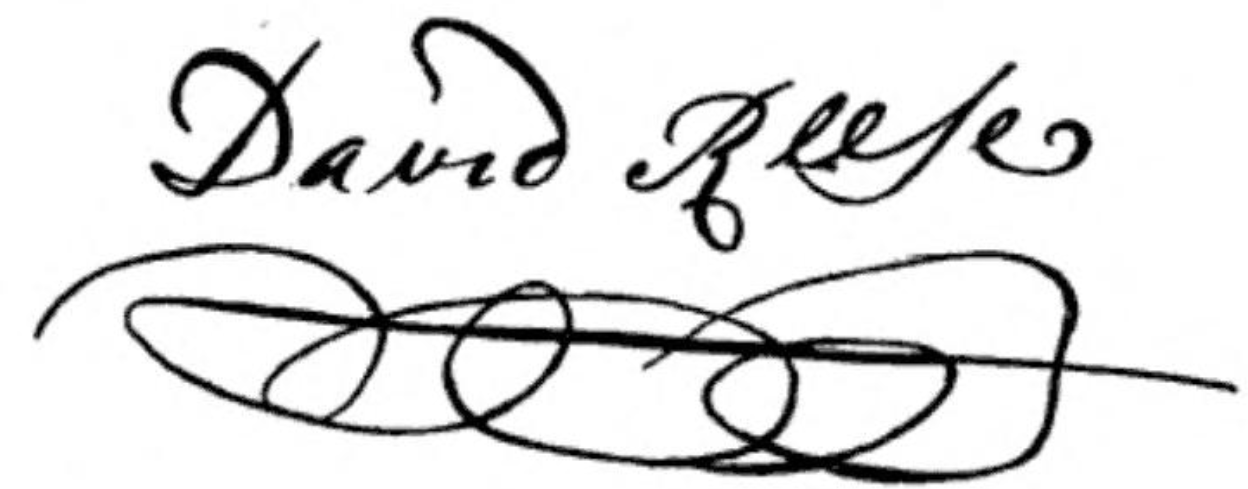
- Signature

David Addison Reese (March 3, 1794 – December 16, 1871) was an American politician and medical doctor.

== Life ==
Reese was born in Charlotte, North Carolina in 1794. He graduated from Jefferson Medical College in Philadelphia, Pennsylvania and began a medical practice in Elberton, Georgia. He later moved to Monticello, Georgia.

Elected to the Georgia Senate in 1829, Reese was re-elected to that office in 1830, 1834, 1835, and 1836. He also served as a trustee for the University of Georgia in Athens for 25 years.

Reese was elected to U.S. House of Representatives in 1852 as a member of the Whig party and served one term. After his congressional service, Reese resumed practicing medicine in Auburn, Alabama, died in that city in 1871 and was buried in Hopewell Cemetery in West Point, Georgia.

U.S. House of Representatives
Preceded by Alexander Stephens	Member of the U.S. House of Representatives from Georgia's 7th congressional district March 4, 1853 – March 3, 1855	Succeeded by Nathaniel Greene Foster
