= John Edwards (Arkansas politician) =

American politician

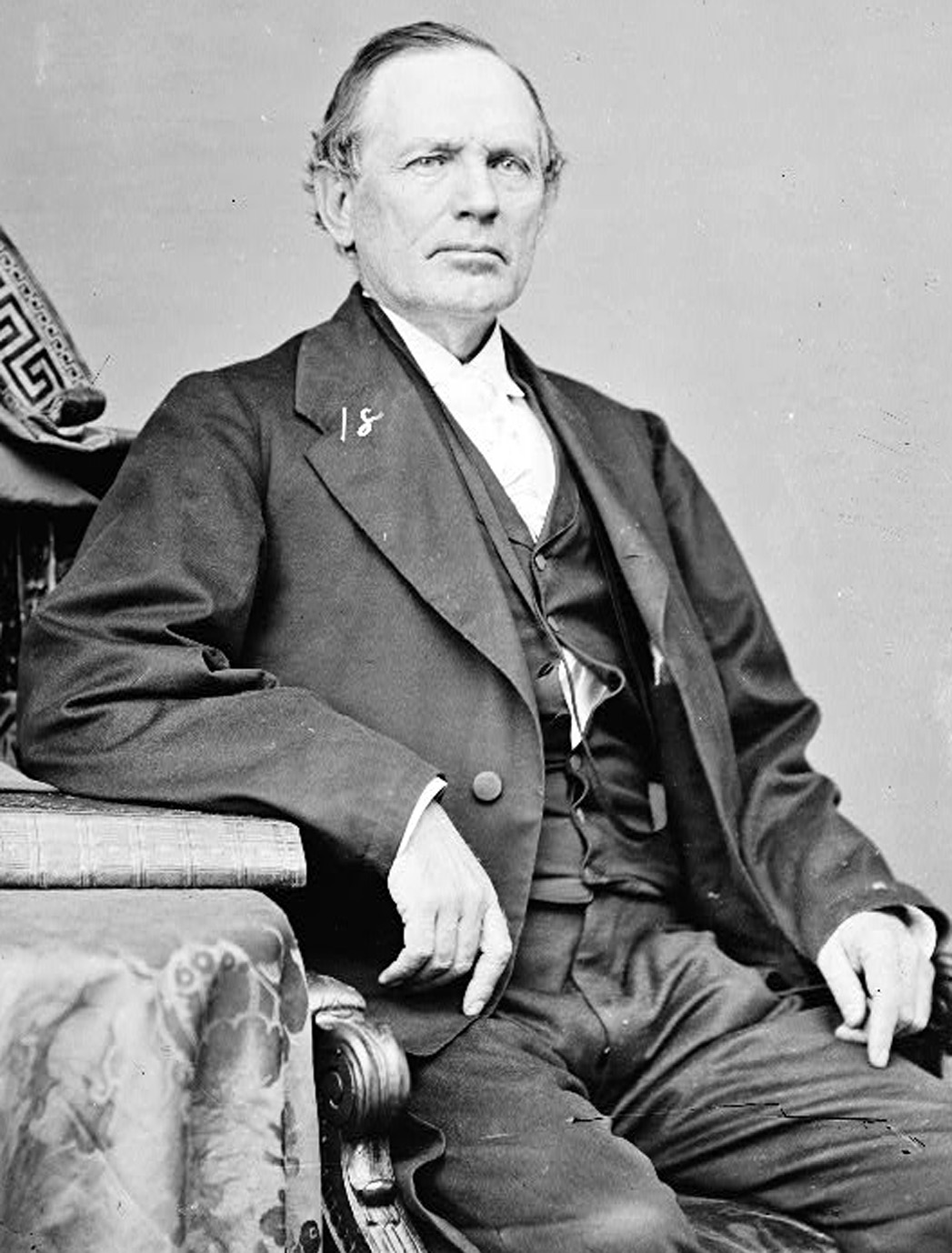

Member of the U.S. House of Representatives from Arkansas's 3rd district
- In office March 4, 1871 – February 9, 1872
- Preceded by: Thomas Boles
- Succeeded by: Thomas Boles

Member of the Indiana Senate from Lawrence County
- In office November 3, 1852 – November 8, 1854
- Preceded by: Benjamin Newland
- Succeeded by: Abraham Jonathan Hostetler

Member of the Indiana House of Representatives from Lawrence County
- In office December 1, 1845 – December 7, 1846
- Preceded by: Lucian Q. Hoggatt
- Succeeded by: Samuel W. Short

Personal details
- Born: October 24, 1815 Louisville, Kentucky, US
- Died: April 8, 1894 (aged 78) Washington, D.C., US
- Spouse: Mary Bevens Edwards

Military service
- Allegiance: United States
- Branch/service: United States Army; Union Army
- Rank: Brevet Brigadier General
- Commands: 18th Iowa Volunteer Infantry
- Battles/wars: American Civil War

John Edwards (October 24, 1815 – April 8, 1894) was an American Civil War brigadier general in the Union Army, an American politician and a U.S. Representative from Arkansas. He served in Congress for less than a year before being removed from office following allegations of fraud in his 1870 election. Edwards also served in both houses of the Indiana General Assembly and was a member and speaker of the Iowa House of Representatives.

== Early life and education ==
Born in Louisville, Kentucky, Edwards received a limited schooling there before moving to Indiana, reportedly because it was a non-slavery state. He had inherited slaves from his father's estate in Kentucky but freed them and gave them property with which to begin a new life in Indiana.

He studied law and was admitted to the bar.

== Family ==
He married Eliza Jane Knight on July 8, 1834, in, Lawrence, Indiana, and they had seven children: Eugene Edgar, John, Marcus, Mary W., Susan Huldah, William T., and Montgomery Gray. His second wife was Catherine Whisenand, and they were married on May 8, 1854, in Chariton, Iowa. They had three children: Nancy, Clarence B., and Alfred. On April 28, 1880, he married Mary Burland Bevans in Washington, D.C., and they had two daughters: Frances Sterling ("Fanny") and Mary Ellen ("Mamie").

== Early career ==
Edwards served in the Indiana House of Representatives for one term in the mid-1840s before moving to California, where in 1849 he was elected an alcalde, a municipal magistrate. Edwards returned to Indiana in 1852, and as a Whig, he served as member of the Indiana State Senate in 1853.

Later in 1853 he moved again, this time to Chariton, Iowa, where he began the practice of law. In 1856 he was chosen a member of the convention which framed the new state constitution which was adopted the following year. He was founder in 1857 of the Patriot newspaper, and became a Republican when that party was organized.

In 1858 he elected to be a member of the Iowa House of Representatives during the Seventh General Assembly. He was reelected and in 1860 was chosen Speaker of the House of the Eighth General Assembly.

== Civil War ==
When the Civil War began Edwards joined the Union Army and was appointed as lieutenant colonel May 21, 1861 and served as aide on the staff of Governor Samuel Kirkwood of Iowa protecting the Missouri border from invasion. On August 8, 1862, he was commissioned colonel of the 18th Iowa Volunteer Infantry, serving through the war, after which he was brevetted brigadier general of volunteers to date from September 26, 1864. He saw action in several military engagements in Missouri and Arkansas.

After the war Edwards settled at Fort Smith, Arkansas, and was appointed by President Johnson as Assessor of Internal Revenue and served from August 15, 1866, to May 31, 1869.

== Congress ==
Because the Republican Party was deeply divided in Arkansas following the Civil War, the congressional elections there were hotly contested in 1870. In the state's Third District, Edwards challenged incumbent congressman Thomas Boles, receiving support from the more Liberal wing of the Republican Party that opposed the reelection of President President Ulysses S. Grant in 1872.

In the initial results of the Third District's 1870 election, Boles led by approximately 3,000 votes; however, Edwards was nevertheless declared the winner by governor Powell Clayton. Using the Governor's declaration as his verification, Edwards presented his credentials of election as a Liberal Republican to the Forty-second Congress. He was accepted as a member of the House and served from March 4, 1871, to February 9, 1872. Boles claimed fraud and refused to accept the results, initiating a House inquiry that eventually ruled in favor of Bowles.

Edwards accepted the verdict and left the House when Boles was sworn in to the seat on February 9, 1872.

== Later career and death ==
After leaving Congress, Edwards opened a private law practice in Washington, D.C.

Edwards died in Washington, D.C., on April 8, 1894. He is buried at Arlington National Cemetery in Arlington, Virginia.

== See also ==
- List of American Civil War generals (Union)

U.S. House of Representatives
Preceded by Thomas Boles	Member of the U.S. House of Representatives from Arkansas's 3rd congressional district 1871–1872	Succeeded by Thomas Boles
