= Henry Snapp =

American politician

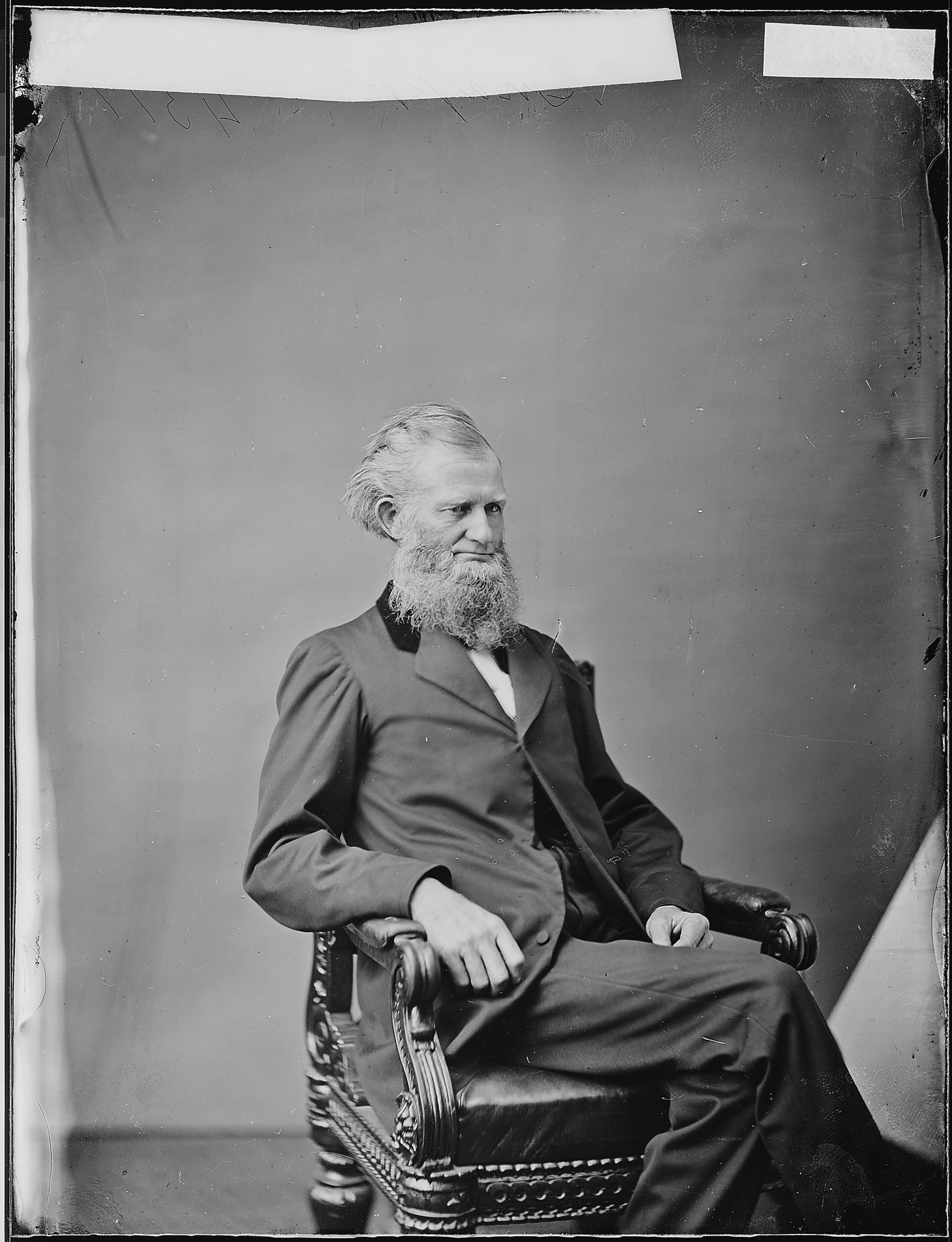
- Snapp c. 1860–65

Member of the U.S. House of Representatives from Illinois's 6th district
- In office December 4, 1871 – March 3, 1873
- Preceded by: Burton C. Cook
- Succeeded by: John B. Hawley

Member of the Illinois Senate
- In office 1858

Personal details
- Born: June 30, 1822 Livonia, New York
- Died: November 26, 1895 (aged 73) Joliet, Illinois
- Party: Republican

Henry Snapp (June 30, 1822 – November 26, 1895) was a U.S. Representative from Illinois. He was the father of Howard Malcolm Snapp, also a U.S. Representative.

== Biography ==
Henry Snapp was born in Livonia, New York on June 30, 1822. When he was three years old, Snapp moved with his parents to Rochester, New York. He attended the public schools of Rochester. He removed with his family to Homer Township, Will County, Illinois, in 1833, where he completed his public education and helped on the family farm. When Snapp reached adulthood, he moved to Joliet and studied law under E. C. fellows & S. W. Randall. He was admitted to the bar in 1843, though he did not practice for another seven years. Snapp was elected city attorney in 1854.

Snapp was elected to the Illinois Senate in 1868 and served one two-year term. There, he lobbied to have the Illinois State Capitol constructed with Joliet limestone. He was re-elected to this position, but resigned from office so that he could be nominated as the Republican candidate to the United States House of Representatives. Snapp was elected to the Forty-second Congress to fill the vacancy caused by the resignation of Burton C. Cook. He served from December 4, 1871, to March 3, 1873. Snapp declined to be a candidate for renomination to the House in 1872. He resumed his law practice in Joliet, where he died on November 26, 1895. He was interred in Oakwood Cemetery.

Snapp married Adeline Broadie in Joliet in January 1847. They had five children: Sarah, Dorrance Dibell, Elizabsth, Henry D., Howard M., and Charles D. Howard would follow in his father's footsteps and be elected as a Republican to the House of Representatives in 1903.

U.S. House of Representatives
Preceded by Burton C. Cook	Member of the U.S. House of Representatives from Illinois's 6th congressional district December 4, 1871 – March 3, 1873	Succeeded by John B. Hawley
