= John B. Hawley =

American politician

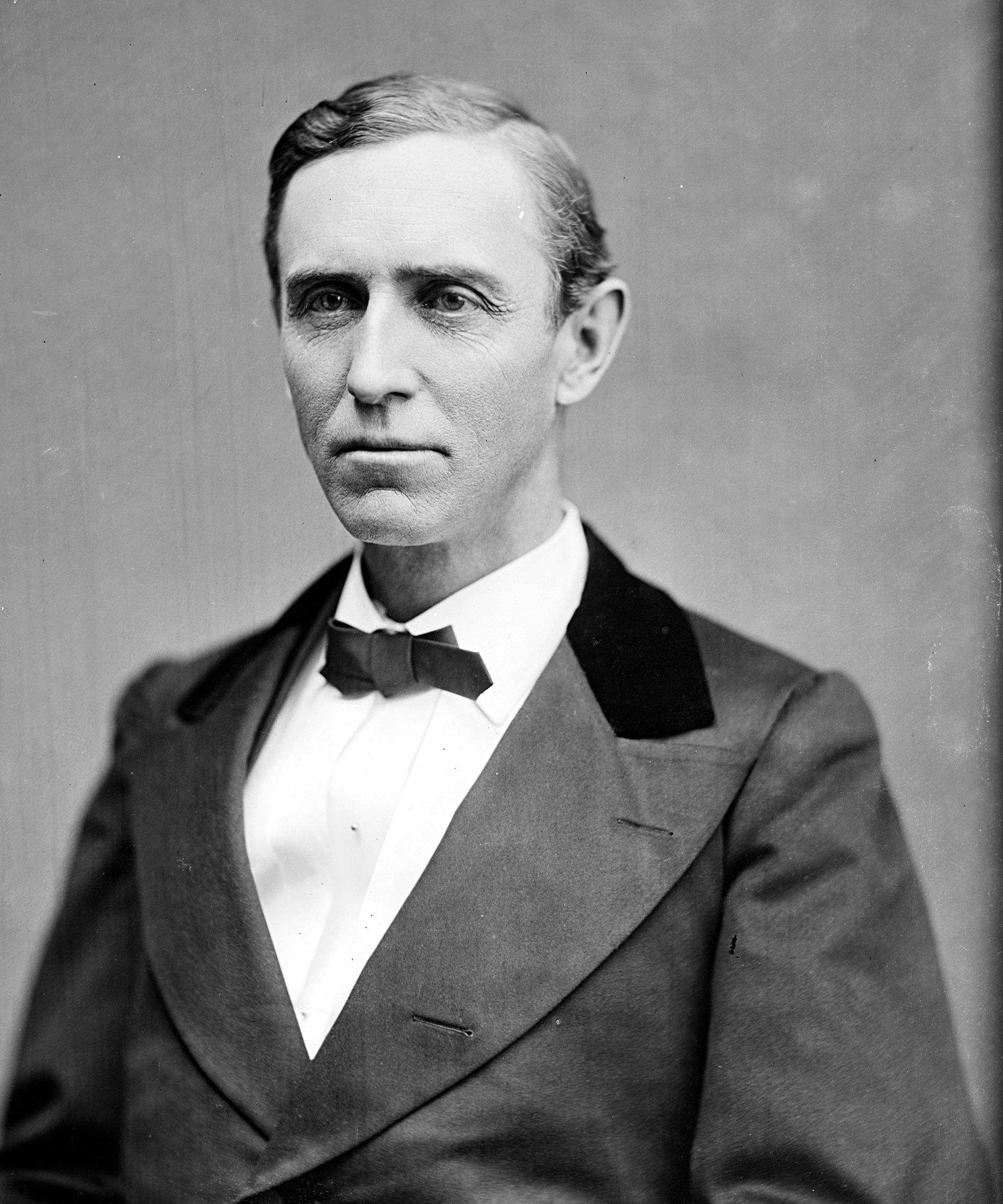
- Hawley c. 1865–1880

Member of the U.S. House of Representatives from Illinois
- In office March 4, 1869 – March 3, 1875
- Preceded by: Abner C. Harding (4th); Henry Snapp (6th)
- Succeeded by: Stephen A. Hurlbut (4th); Thomas J. Henderson (6th)
- Constituency: 4th district (1869-73); 6th district (1873-75)

Personal details
- Born: February 9, 1831 Hawleyville, Connecticut, U.S.
- Died: May 24, 1895 (aged 64) Hot Springs, South Dakota, U.S.
- Party: Republican

John Baldwin Hawley (February 9, 1831 – May 24, 1895) was an American government official. Born in Connecticut and raised in Illinois, Hawley served in the United States House of Representatives from 1869 to 1875.

== Early life ==
Hawley was born in Hawleyville, Connecticut. He moved with his parents to Carthage, Illinois in 1833. While in Carthage, Hawley attended public school and was later accepted to Jacksonville College in Jacksonville, Illinois. Hawley studied law, and was subsequently admitted to the Illinois bar. He began his legal practice in Rock Island, Illinois.

== Career ==
Hawley was elected Illinois state attorney in 1856 and remained in the position for four years. Hawley enlisted in the Union Army during the Civil War and served as captain of Company H, Forty-Fifth Regiment of Illinois' Volunteer Infantry. He was severely wounded at Fort Donelson. A close friend of President Abraham Lincoln, he was appointed postmaster of Rock Island, Illinois, in 1865, and was removed the year following by President Johnson.

Hawley was elected as a Republican to the forty-first, forty-second, and forty-third Congress. He served as chairman of the Committee on Expenditures on Public Buildings and the Committee on Claims. He was an unsuccessful candidate for renomination in 1874.

From December 6, 1877, until April 1880, when he resigned, Hawley served as the Assistant Secretary of the Treasury.

=== Later career ===
He moved to Chicago, Illinois, in 1880 and resumed the practice of law. After moving to Omaha, Nebraska in 1886, Hawley served as an attorney for the western branches of the Northwestern Railroad Company.

== Personal life ==
In 1854, Hawley was married to Mary Fuller Symonds (1835–1908). Together, they were the parents of three daughters Hattie, Clara, and Mary Hawley.

He died in Hot Springs, South Dakota on May 24, 1895. Hawley was interred in Prospect Hill Cemetery, Omaha, Nebraska.
