= Thomas M. Norwood =

American politician

Thomas Manson Norwood
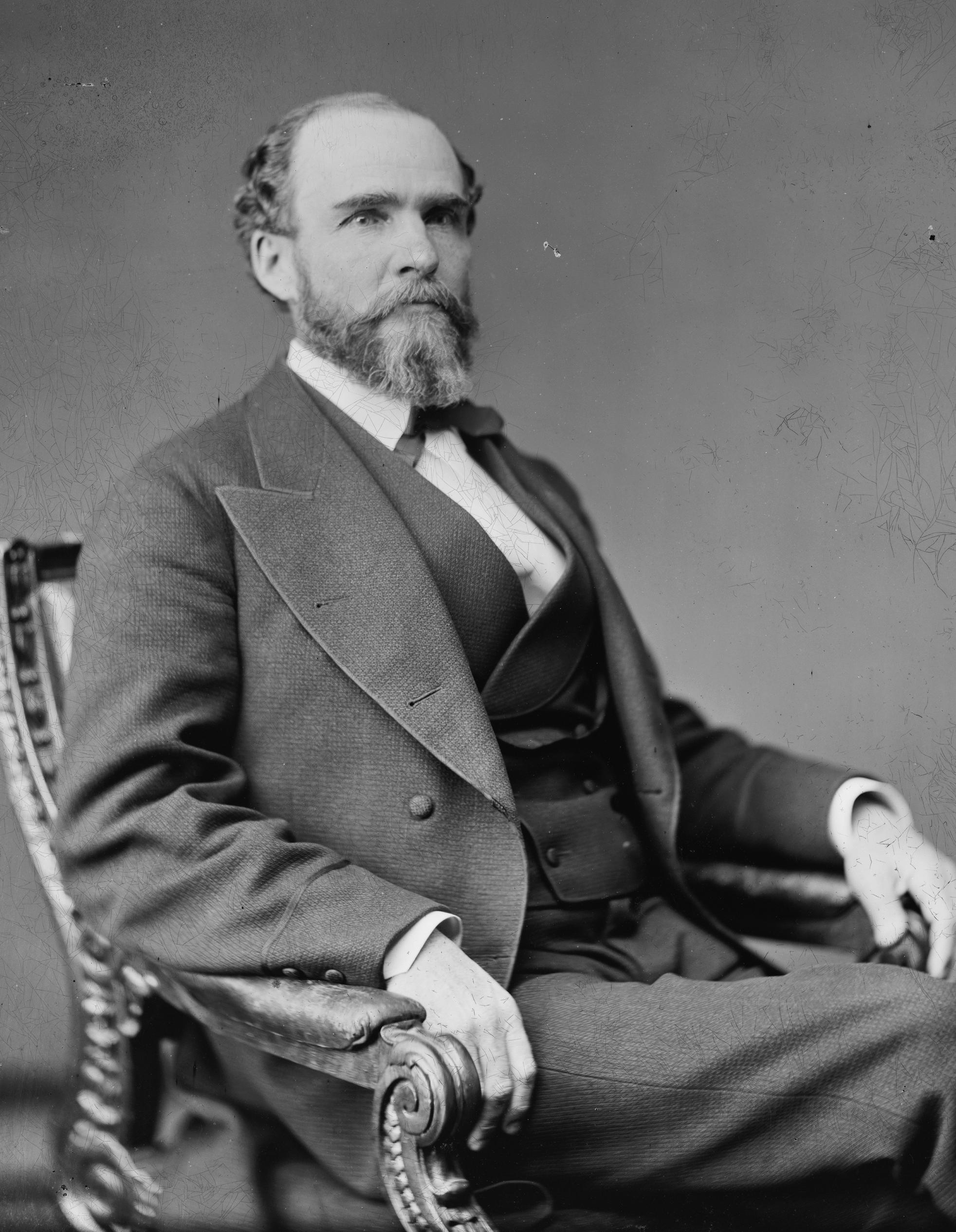

Member of the U.S. House of Representatives from Georgia's 1st district
- In office March 4, 1885 – March 3, 1889
- Preceded by: John C. Nicholls
- Succeeded by: James W. Overstreet

United States Senator from Georgia
- In office November 14, 1871 – March 3, 1877
- Preceded by: Homer V. M. Miller
- Succeeded by: Benjamin H. Hill

Member of the Georgia House of Representatives
- In office 1851–1862

Personal details
- Born: April 26, 1830 Talbot County, Georgia
- Died: June 19, 1913 (aged 83) Savannah, Georgia
- Resting place: Laurel Grove Cemetery
- Party: Democratic

Thomas Manson Norwood (April 26, 1830 – June 19, 1913) was a United States senator and Representative from Georgia.

== Early years and education ==
Born in Talbot County, Georgia, he pursued an academic course, and graduated from Emory College in 1850. He studied law under Georgia governor James Milton Smith, and was admitted to the bar in 1852, commencing practice in Savannah.

== Political service ==
He was a member of the Georgia House of Representatives from 1861 to 1862 and was a presidential elector on the Democratic ticket in 1868. He was elected as a Democrat to the U.S. Senate and served from November 14, 1871, to March 3, 1877. Norwood was the first Democrat from the South seated in the Senate after the Civil War. He was a staunch critic of the Civil Rights Act of 1875. He resumed the practice of law in Savannah and was elected as a Representative to the Forty-ninth and Fiftieth U.S. Congresses, serving from March 4, 1885, to March 3, 1889.

== Legal career ==
In 1889 he again resumed the practice of law and was appointed judge of the city court of Savannah in 1896, serving twelve years.

In his last address before his retirement on December 31, 1907, Norwood called for the execution of Black men who had consensual sexual relationships with White women, accusing them of being violent and abusive. He also called for life imprisonment for White women who were involved in subjecting Black people to chattel slavery.

== Death and legacy ==
He returned to his country home, Harrock Hall, near Savannah, and died there in June 1913. Interment was in Laurel Grove Cemetery, Savannah. His posthumously published book A True Vindication of the South argued that the South had been justified in its fight against the North.

== Works ==
- A true vindication of the South, in a review of American political history Savannah, Ga., Braid and Hutton 1917.
- Norwood, Thomas M. Mother Goose carved by a commentator. Savannah: Morning News, 1900.

U.S. Senate
Preceded by Homer V. M. Miller	U.S. senator (Class 2) from Georgia; November 14, 1871 – March 3, 1877; Served alongside: Joshua Hill, John B. Gordon	Succeeded by Benjamin Harvey Hill
U.S. House of Representatives
Preceded by John C. Nicholls	Member of the U.S. House of Representatives from Georgia's 1st congressional district March 4, 1885 – March 3, 1889	Succeeded by Rufus E. Lester
