= Burton C. Cook =

American politician (1819–1894)

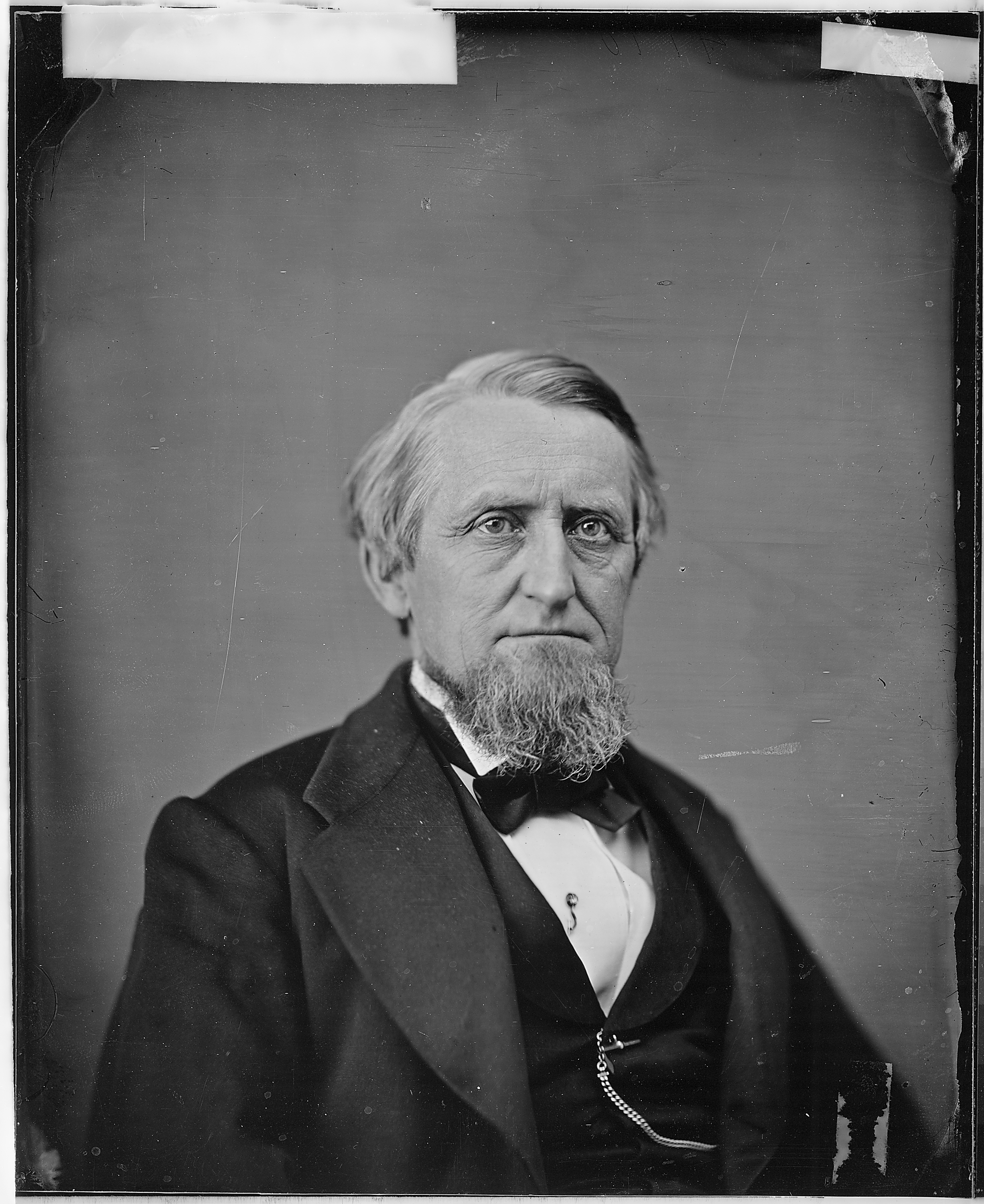
- Cook c. 1860–65

Member of the U.S. House of Representatives from Illinois's 6th district
- In office March 4, 1865 – August 26, 1871
- Preceded by: Jesse O. Norton
- Succeeded by: Henry Snapp

Member of the Illinois Senate
- In office 1852-1860

Personal details
- Born: May 11, 1819 Pittsford, New York
- Died: August 18, 1894 (aged 75) Evanston, Illinois
- Party: Republican
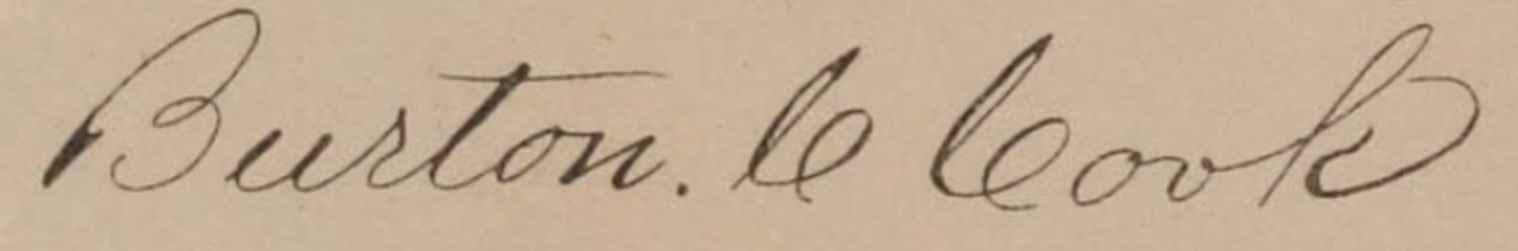
- Signature

Burton Chauncey Cook (May 11, 1819 – August 18, 1894) was a U.S. representative from Illinois.

== Biography ==
He was born in Pittsford, New Yorkon May 11, 1819. Cook attended the Collegiate Institute, Rochester, New York. He studied law, and in 1835, he moved to Ottawa, Illinois, where he commenced the practice of law in 1840.

In 1846, Cook was elected by the legislature to the position of State's attorney for the ninth judicial district for two years. He was reelected by the people in 1848 for four years. He served as member of the Illinois Senate 1852–1860. He served as delegate to the Republican National Convention in 1860 and 1864. He served as member of the peace convention of 1861 held in Washington, D.C., in an effort to devise means to prevent the impending war.

Cook was elected as a Republican to the Thirty-ninth and to the three succeeding Congresses and served from March 4, 1865, to August 26, 1871, when he resigned. He served as chairman of the Committee on Roads and Canals (Fortieth Congress), and the Committee on District of Columbia (Forty-first Congress).

He resumed the practice of his profession in Evanston, Illinois, and died there August 18, 1894. He was interred in Oakwood Cemetery, Chicago, Illinois.

U.S. House of Representatives
Preceded by Jesse O. Norton	Member of the U.S. House of Representatives from Illinois's 6th congressional district March 4, 1865 - August 26, 1871	Succeeded by Henry Snapp
