= Joshua Hill (politician) =

American politician (1812–1891)

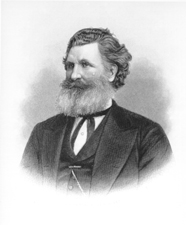

United States Senator from Georgia
- In office February 1, 1871 – March 3, 1873
- Preceded by: Alfred Iverson, Sr.
- Succeeded by: John B. Gordon

Member of the U.S. House of Representatives from Georgia's 7th district
- In office March 4, 1857 – January 23, 1861
- Preceded by: Nathaniel G. Foster
- Succeeded by: District inactive

Personal details
- Born: January 10, 1812 Abbeville County, South Carolina, U.S.
- Died: March 6, 1891 (aged 79) Madison, Georgia, U.S.
- Party: American Party, Republican

Joshua Hill (January 10, 1812 – March 6, 1891) was an American politician who served as a United States senator from the state of Georgia.

== Early years and legal practice ==
Joshua Hill was born in 1812, in the Abbeville District, South Carolina to Joshua Hill, Sr. and Nancy Ann Wyatt Collier. He attended the common schools, and upon graduation took up the study of law. In 1833 Hill moved to Monticello, Georgia where he establish a law practice. Hill married Emily Reid of Monticello in 1836, she was 16 years old. They had four daughters and one son. Fifteen years later, in 1848 Hill moved to Madison, where he would maintain a residence for the rest of his life.

== Political career ==
=== U.S. House of Representatives ===
Hill is said to have had "strong Whig and Unionist principles" which aligned him with Whig Party until that organization dissolved in Georgia. Hill then became a member of the American Party (also called the Know-Nothing Party). The Know Nothing Party in his congressional district nominated Hill (without his solicitation) to run for the United States House of Representatives from Georgia in 1857, and it was under that banner that he was elected. He was re-elected to a second term in 1859, but resigned on January 23, 1861, shortly after the state convention passed an ordinance of secession in Georgia.

=== Mayor of Madison, Georgia ===
In 1864, Hill was elected mayor of Madison, Georgia. During the later stages of the Civil War, Hill lost his only son during the Atlanta campaign in fighting near Lithonia, Georgia. When Hill went to retrieve his son's body, he stopped to speak with General William Tecumseh Sherman, with a request that Union troops under Sherman's command not burn the town of Madison which was on the path of Sherman's March to the Sea. While Sherman agreed, the portion of his troops passing through Madison were under the command of subordinate General Henry Warner Slocum. When General Slocum approached Madison, Joshua Hill went out to meet him. General Slocum honored the agreement previously struck with General Sherman, and only burned the cotton gin, the railroad station, and anything that contributed to the war effort, but not houses.

=== United States Senate ===
Following the end of the Civil War, Hill was elected to the United States Senate from Georgia as a Republican in 1867. However, he did not serve in the Senate until 1871 when Georgia was readmitted to the United States. He served in the Senate until the end of his term in 1873 and did not run for reelection. He resumed the practice of law and died in Madison, Georgia.

Hill became the first Republican U.S. Senator from the state of Georgia. Soon afterwards, Reconstruction ended, and Georgia would not elect another Republican to the Senate until Mack Mattingly in 1980.

== Death and legacy ==
Hill died in Madison on March 6, 1891, with interment in Madison Cemetery. He is remembered for his congressional work, obtaining the transfer of deed of the old U.S. Mint Offices in Dahlonega, Georgia to the fledgling North Georgia Agricultural College which later evolved into the University of North Georgia.

== Relevant Academic Literature ==
- Rice, Bradley. Joshua Hill of Madison: Civil War Unionist and Georgia's First Republican Senator, 1812-1891. Mercer University Press. ISBN 9780881469608.

U.S. House of Representatives
Preceded by Nathaniel G. Foster	Member of the U.S. House of Representatives from Georgia's 7th congressional district March 4, 1857 – January 23, 1861	Succeeded by vacant^{1}
U.S. Senate
Preceded by vacant^{2}	U.S. senator (Class 3) from Georgia; February 1, 1871 – March 3, 1873; Served alongside: Homer V. M. Miller, Thomas M. Norwood	Succeeded by John B. Gordon
Notes and references
1. Because of Georgia's secession from the Union in 1861, seat was vacant from 1861 to 1868, before Pierce M. B. Young was elected to the seat.; 2. Because of Georgia's secession from the Union in 1861, seat was vacant from 1861 to 1871, after Alfred Iverson, Sr. withdrew from the Senate.
