= List of United States representatives in the 40th Congress =

This is a complete list of United States representatives during the 40th United States Congress listed by seniority.

As an historical article, the districts and party affiliations listed reflect those during the 40th Congress (March 4, 1867 – March 3, 1869). Seats and party affiliations on similar lists for other congresses will be different for certain members.

Seniority depends on the date on which members were sworn into office. Since many members are sworn in on the same day, subsequent ranking is based on previous congressional service of the individual and then by alphabetical order by the last name of the representative.

Committee chairmanship in the House is often associated with seniority. However, party leadership is typically not associated with seniority.

Note: The "*" indicates that the representative/delegate may have served one or more non-consecutive terms while in the House of Representatives of the United States Congress.

== U.S. House seniority list ==
U.S. House seniority
Rank	Representative	Party	District	Seniority date (Previous service, if any)	No.# of term(s)	Notes
1	Elihu B. Washburne	R	IL-03	March 4, 1853	8th term	Dean of the House
2	Schuyler Colfax	R	IN-09	March 4, 1855	7th term	Speaker of the House; Left the House in 1869.
3	Henry L. Dawes	R	MA-10	March 4, 1857	6th term	
4	James M. Ashley	R	OH-10	March 4, 1859	5th term	Left the House in 1869.
5	Thomas D. Eliot	R	MA-01	March 4, 1859; Previous service, 1854–1855.	6th term*	Left the House in 1869.
6	James K. Moorhead	R	PA-22	March 4, 1859	5th term	Left the House in 1869.
7	Thaddeus Stevens	R	PA-09	March 4, 1859; Previous service, 1849–1853.	7th term*	Died on August 11, 1868.
8	William Windom	R	MN-01	March 4, 1859	5th term	Left the House in 1869.
9	Fernando C. Beaman	R	MI-01	March 4, 1861	4th term	
10	George W. Julian	R	IN-05	March 4, 1861; Previous service, 1849–1851.	5th term*	
11	William D. Kelley	R	PA-04	March 4, 1861	4th term	
12	Frederick A. Pike	R	ME-05	March 4, 1861	4th term	Left the House in 1869.
13	Theodore M. Pomeroy	R	NY-24	March 4, 1861	4th term	Speaker after Colfax resigned. Left the House in 1869.
14	Francis Thomas	R	MD-04	March 4, 1861; Previous service, 1831–1841.	9th term*	Left the House in 1869.
15	James F. Wilson	R	IA-01	October 8, 1861	4th term	Left the House in 1869.
16	Samuel Hooper	R	MA-04	December 2, 1861	4th term	
17	William B. Allison	R	IA-03	March 4, 1863	3rd term	
18	Oakes Ames	R	MA-02	March 4, 1863	3rd term	
19	John D. Baldwin	R	MA-08	March 4, 1863	3rd term	Left the House in 1869.
20	James G. Blaine	R	ME-03	March 4, 1863	3rd term	
21	George S. Boutwell	R	MA-07	March 4, 1863	3rd term	
22	John Martin Broomall	R	PA-07	March 4, 1863	3rd term	Left the House in 1869.
23	John W. Chanler	D	NY-07	March 4, 1863	3rd term	Left the House in 1869.
24	Amasa Cobb	R	WI-03	March 4, 1863	3rd term	
25	Charles Denison	D	PA-12	March 4, 1863	3rd term	Died on June 27, 1867.
26	Nathan F. Dixon II	R	RI-02	March 4, 1863; Previous service, 1849–1851.	4th term*	
27	Ignatius L. Donnelly	R	MN-02	March 4, 1863	3rd term	Left the House in 1869.
28	John F. Driggs	R	MI-06	March 4, 1863	3rd term	Left the House in 1869.
29	Ephraim R. Eckley	R	OH-17	March 4, 1863	3rd term	Left the House in 1869.
30	Charles A. Eldredge	D	WI-04	March 4, 1863	3rd term	
31	John F. Farnsworth	R	IL-02	March 4, 1863; Previous service, 1857–1861.	5th term*	
32	James A. Garfield	R	OH-19	March 4, 1863	3rd term	
33	John A. Griswold	R	NY-15	March 4, 1863	3rd term	Left the House in 1869.
34	William Higby	R	CA-02	March 4, 1863	3rd term	Left the House in 1869.
35	Asahel W. Hubbard	R	IA-06	March 4, 1863	3rd term	Left the House in 1869.
36	Calvin T. Hulburd	R	NY-17	March 4, 1863	3rd term	Left the House in 1869.
37	Thomas Jenckes	R	RI-01	March 4, 1863	3rd term	
38	Benjamin F. Loan	R	MO-07	March 4, 1863	3rd term	Left the House in 1869.
39	James M. Marvin	R	NY-18	March 4, 1863	3rd term	Left the House in 1869.
40	Joseph W. McClurg	R	MO-05	March 4, 1863	3rd term	Resigned in July 1868.
41	Leonard Myers	R	PA-03	March 4, 1863	3rd term	Left the House in 1869.
42	Godlove Stein Orth	R	IN-08	March 4, 1863	3rd term	
43	Charles O'Neill	R	PA-02	March 4, 1863	3rd term	
44	Sidney Perham	R	ME-02	March 4, 1863	3rd term	Left the House in 1869.
45	Hiram Price	R	IA-02	March 4, 1863	3rd term	Left the House in 1869.
46	Samuel J. Randall	D	PA-01	March 4, 1863	3rd term	
47	Lewis Winans Ross	D	IL-09	March 4, 1863	3rd term	Left the House in 1869.
48	Robert C. Schenck	R	OH-03	March 4, 1863; Previous service, 1843–1851.	7th term*	
49	Glenni W. Scofield	R	PA-19	March 4, 1863	3rd term	
50	Rufus P. Spalding	R	OH-18	March 4, 1863	3rd term	Left the House in 1869.
51	Charles Upson	R	MI-02	March 4, 1863	3rd term	Left the House in 1869.
52	William B. Washburn	R	MA-09	March 4, 1863	3rd term	
53	Thomas Williams	R	PA-23	March 4, 1863	3rd term	Left the House in 1869.
54	Frederick E. Woodbridge	R	VT-01	March 4, 1863	3rd term	Left the House in 1869.
55	Ebon C. Ingersoll	R	IL-05	May 20, 1864	3rd term	
56	Delos R. Ashley	R	NV	March 4, 1865	2nd term	Left the House in 1869.
57	George W. Anderson	R	MO-09	March 4, 1865	2nd term	Left the House in 1869.
58	Jehu Baker	R	IL-12	March 4, 1865	2nd term	Left the House in 1869.
59	John F. Benjamin	R	MO-08	March 4, 1865	2nd term	
60	John Bingham	R	OH-16	March 4, 1865; Previous service, 1855–1863.	6th term*	
61	Henry P. H. Bromwell	R	IL-07	March 4, 1865	2nd term	Left the House in 1869.
62	Benjamin M. Boyer	D	PA-06	March 4, 1865	2nd term	Left the House in 1869.
63	Ralph P. Buckland	R	OH-09	March 4, 1865	2nd term	Left the House in 1869.
64	Reader W. Clarke	R	OH-06	March 4, 1865	2nd term	Left the House in 1869.
65	Sidney Clarke	R	KS	March 4, 1865	2nd term	
66	Burton C. Cook	R	IL-06	March 4, 1865	2nd term	
67	Shelby M. Cullom	R	IL-08	March 4, 1865	2nd term	
68	Benjamin Eggleston	R	OH-01	March 4, 1865	2nd term	Left the House in 1869.
69	Thomas W. Ferry	R	MI-04	March 4, 1865	2nd term	
70	Adam J. Glossbrenner	D	PA-15	March 4, 1865	2nd term	Left the House in 1869.
71	Abner C. Harding	R	IL-04	March 4, 1865	2nd term	Left the House in 1869.
72	Rutherford B. Hayes	R	OH-02	March 4, 1865	2nd term	Resigned on July 20, 1867.
73	Chester D. Hubbard	R	WV-01	March 4, 1865	2nd term	Left the House in 1869.
74	James M. Humphrey	D	NY-30	March 4, 1865	2nd term	Left the House in 1869.
75	Michael C. Kerr	D	IN-02	March 4, 1865	2nd term	
76	John H. Ketcham	R	NY-12	March 4, 1865	2nd term	
77	Addison H. Laflin	R	NY-20	March 4, 1865	2nd term	
78	George Van Eman Lawrence	R	PA-24	March 4, 1865	2nd term	Left the House in 1869.
79	William Lawrence	R	OH-04	March 4, 1865	2nd term	
80	John Lynch	R	ME-01	March 4, 1865	2nd term	
81	Samuel S. Marshall	D	IL-11	March 4, 1865; Previous service, 1855–1859.	4th term*	
82	Hiram McCullough	D	MD-01	March 4, 1865	2nd term	Left the House in 1869.
83	Ulysses Mercur	R	PA-13	March 4, 1865	2nd term	
84	George F. Miller	R	PA-14	March 4, 1865	2nd term	Left the House in 1869.
85	William E. Niblack	D	IN-01	March 4, 1865; Previous service, 1857–1861.	4th term*	
86	John A. Nicholson	D	DE	March 4, 1865	2nd term	Left the House in 1869.
87	Thomas E. Noell	D	MO-03	March 4, 1865	2nd term	Died on October 3, 1867.
88	Halbert E. Paine	R	WI-01	March 4, 1865	2nd term	
89	Charles E. Phelps	D	MD-03	March 4, 1865	2nd term	Left the House in 1869.
90	Tobias A. Plants	R	OH-15	March 4, 1865	2nd term	Left the House in 1869.
91	Philetus Sawyer	R	WI-05	March 4, 1865	2nd term	
92	Samuel Shellabarger	R	OH-07	March 4, 1865; Previous service, 1861–1863.	3rd term*	Left the House in 1869.
93	Charles Sitgreaves	D	NJ-03	March 4, 1865	2nd term	Left the House in 1869.
94	Stephen Taber	D	NY-01	March 4, 1865	2nd term	Left the House in 1869.
95	Lawrence S. Trimble	D	KY-01	March 4, 1865	2nd term	
96	Rowland E. Trowbridge	R	MI-05	March 4, 1865; Previous service, 1861–1863.	3rd term*	Left the House in 1869.
97	Burt Van Horn	R	NY-29	March 4, 1865; Previous service, 1861–1863.	3rd term*	Left the House in 1869.
98	Henry Van Aernam	R	NY-31	March 4, 1865	2nd term	Left the House in 1869.
99	Robert T. Van Horn	R	MO-06	March 4, 1865	2nd term	
100	Hamilton Ward, Sr.	R	NY-27	March 4, 1865	2nd term	
101	Martin Welker	R	OH-14	March 4, 1865	2nd term	
102	Stephen F. Wilson	R	PA-18	March 4, 1865	2nd term	Left the House in 1869.
103	Nathaniel P. Banks	R	MA-06	December 4, 1865; Previous service, 1853–1857.	5th term*	
104	Isaac R. Hawkins	R	TN-07	December 4, 1865	2nd term	
105	Henry D. Washburn	R	IN-07	February 23, 1866	2nd term	Left the House in 1869.
106	William Henry Koontz	R	PA-16	July 18, 1866	2nd term	Left the House in 1869.
107	Samuel M. Arnell	R	TN-06	July 24, 1866	2nd term	
108	Horace Maynard	R	TN-02	July 24, 1866; Previous service, 1857–1863.	5th term*	
109	William Brickly Stokes	R	TN-03	July 24, 1866; Previous service, 1859–1861.	3rd term*	
110	Elijah Hise	R	KY-03	December 3, 1866	2nd term	Died on May 8, 1867.
111	George M. Adams	D	KY-08	March 4, 1867	1st term	
112	Stevenson Archer	D	MD-02	March 4, 1867	1st term	
113	Samuel Beach Axtell	D	CA-01	March 4, 1867	1st term	
114	Daniel Myers Van Auken	D	PA-11	March 4, 1867	1st term	
115	William Henry Barnum	D	CT-04	March 4, 1867	1st term	
116	Demas Barnes	D	NY-02	March 4, 1867	1st term	Left the House in 1869.
117	James B. Beck	D	KY-07	March 4, 1867	1st term	
118	Jacob Benton	R	NH-03	March 4, 1867	1st term	
119	Austin Blair	R	MI-03	March 4, 1867	1st term	
120	James Brooks	D	NY-08	March 4, 1867; Previous service, 1849–1853 and 1863–1866.	6th term**	
121	Albert G. Burr	D	IL-10	March 4, 1867	1st term	
122	Benjamin Butler	R	MA-05	March 4, 1867	1st term	
123	Roderick R. Butler	R	TN-01	March 4, 1867	1st term	
124	Henry L. Cake	R	PA-10	March 4, 1867	1st term	
125	John C. Churchill	R	NY-22	March 4, 1867	1st term	
126	John Coburn	R	IN-06	March 4, 1867	1st term	
127	Thomas Cornell	R	NY-13	March 4, 1867	1st term	Left the House in 1869.
128	John Covode	W	PA-21	March 4, 1867; Previous service, 1855–1863.	5th term*	Left the House in 1869.
129	Grenville M. Dodge	R	IA-05	March 4, 1867	1st term	Left the House in 1869.
130	Jacob H. Ela	R	NH-01	March 4, 1867	1st term	
131	Orange Ferriss	R	NY-16	March 4, 1867	1st term	
132	William C. Fields	R	NY-19	March 4, 1867	1st term	Left the House in 1869.
133	Darwin Abel Finney	R	PA-20	March 4, 1867	1st term	Died on August 25, 1868.
134	John Fox	D	NY-04	March 4, 1867	1st term	
135	James L. Getz	D	PA-08	March 4, 1867	1st term	
136	Joseph J. Gravely	R	MO-04	March 4, 1867	1st term	Left the House in 1869.
137	Asa Grover	D	KY-05	March 4, 1867	1st term	Left the House in 1869.
138	Charles Haight	D	NJ-02	March 4, 1867	1st term	
139	George A. Halsey	R	NJ-05	March 4, 1867	1st term	Left the House in 1869.
140	Cornelius S. Hamilton	R	OH-08	March 4, 1867	1st term	Died on December 22, 1867.
141	John Hill	R	NJ-04	March 4, 1867	1st term	
142	William S. Holman	D	IN-04	March 4, 1867; Previous service, 1859–1865.	4th term*	
143	Benjamin F. Hopkins	R	WI-02	March 4, 1867	1st term	
144	Julius Hotchkiss	D	CT-02	March 4, 1867	1st term	Left the House in 1869.
145	Richard D. Hubbard	D	CT-01	March 4, 1867	1st term	Left the House in 1869.
146	Morton C. Hunter	R	IN-03	March 4, 1867	1st term	Left the House in 1869.
147	James A. Johnson	D	CA-03	March 4, 1867	1st term	
148	Thomas L. Jones	D	KY-06	March 4, 1867	1st term	
149	Norman B. Judd	R	IL-01	March 4, 1867	1st term	
150	William H. Kelsey	R	NY-25	March 4, 1867; Previous service, 1855–1859.	3rd term*	
151	Bethuel Kitchen	R	WV-02	March 4, 1867	1st term	Left the House in 1869.
152	William S. Lincoln	R	NY-26	March 4, 1867	1st term	Left the House in 1869.
153	John A. Logan	R	IL	March 4, 1867; Previous service, 1859–1862.	3rd term*	
154	William Loughridge	R	IA-04	March 4, 1867	1st term	
155	J. Proctor Knott	D	KY-04	March 4, 1867	1st term	
156	Rufus Mallory	R	OR	March 4, 1867	1st term	Left the House in 1869.
157	Dennis McCarthy	R	NY-23	March 4, 1867	1st term	
158	George W. Morgan	D	OH-13	March 4, 1867	1st term	Resigned on June 3, 1868.
159	William Moore	R	NJ-01	March 4, 1867	1st term	
160	Daniel Johnson Morrell	R	PA-17	March 4, 1867	1st term	
161	John Morrissey	D	NY-05	March 4, 1867	1st term	
162	James Mullins	R	TN-04	March 4, 1867	1st term	Left the House in 1869.
163	William Mungen	D	OH-05	March 4, 1867	1st term	
164	Carman A. Newcomb	R	MO-02	March 4, 1867	1st term	Left the House in 1869.
165	David A. Nunn	R	TN-08	March 4, 1867	1st term	Left the House in 1869.
166	Green Berry Raum	R	IL-13	March 4, 1867	1st term	Left the House in 1869.
167	John A. Peters	R	ME-04	March 4, 1867	1st term	
168	William A. Pile	R	MO-01	March 4, 1867	1st term	Left the House in 1869.
169	Luke P. Poland	R	VT-02	March 4, 1867	1st term	
170	Daniel Polsley	R	WV-03	March 4, 1867	1st term	Left the House in 1869.
171	John V. L. Pruyn	D	NY-14	March 4, 1867; Previous service, 1863–1865.	2nd term*	Left the House in 1869.
172	William E. Robinson	D	NY-03	March 4, 1867	1st term	Left the House in 1869.
173	William H. Robertson	R	NY-10	March 4, 1867	1st term	Left the House in 1869.
174	Lewis Selye	R	NY-28	March 4, 1867	1st term	Left the House in 1869.
175	John P. C. Shanks	R	IN-11	March 4, 1867; Previous service, 1861–1863.	2nd term*	
176	Worthington C. Smith	R	VT-03	March 4, 1867	1st term	
177	Henry H. Starkweather	R	CT-03	March 4, 1867	1st term	
178	Aaron F. Stevens	R	NH-02	March 4, 1867	1st term	
179	Thomas E. Stewart	R	NY-06	March 4, 1867	1st term	Left the House in 1869.
180	Frederick Stone	D	MD-05	March 4, 1867	1st term	
181	J. Hale Sypher	R	LA-01	March 4, 1867	1st term	
182	John Taffe	D	NE	March 4, 1867	1st term	
183	Caleb N. Taylor	R	PA-05	March 4, 1867	1st term	Left the House in 1869.
184	John Trimble	R	TN-05	March 4, 1867	1st term	Left the House in 1869.
185	Ginery Twichell	R	MA-03	March 4, 1867	1st term	
186	Cadwallader C. Washburn	R	WI-06	March 4, 1867; Previous service, 1855–1861.	4th term*	
187	William Williams	R	IN-10	March 4, 1867	1st term	
188	John T. Wilson	R	OH-11	March 4, 1867	1st term	
189	Philadelph Van Trump	D	OH-12	March 4, 1867	1st term	
190	Charles Van Wyck	R	NY-11	March 4, 1867; Previous service, 1859–1863.	3rd term*	Left the House in 1869.
191	Fernando Wood	D	NY-09	March 4, 1867; Previous service, 1841–1843 and 1863–1865.	3rd term**	
	Samuel F. Cary	R	OH-02	November 21, 1867	1st term	Left the House in 1869.
	George W. Woodward	D	PA-12	November 21, 1867	1st term	
	Alexander H. Bailey	R	NY-21	November 30, 1867	1st term	
	Jacob Golladay	D	KY-03	December 5, 1867	1st term	
	James R. McCormick	D	MO-03	December 17, 1867	1st term	
	John Beatty	R	OH-08	February 5, 1868	1st term	
	Columbus Delano	R	OH-13	June 3, 1868; Previous service, 1845–1847 and 1865–1867.	3rd term**	Left the House in 1869.
	Thomas Boles	R	AR-03	June 22, 1868	1st term	
	James M. Hinds	R	AR-02	June 22, 1868	1st term	Died on October 22, 1868.
	Samuel McKee	R	KY-09	June 22, 1868; Previous service, 1865–1867.	2nd term*	Left the House in 1869.
	Logan H. Roots	R	AR-01	June 22, 1868	1st term	
	Samuel F. Gove	R	GA-04	June 25, 1868	1st term	Left the House in 1869.
	Charles M. Hamilton	R	FL	July 1, 1868	1st term	
	John T. Deweese	R	NC-04	July 6, 1868	1st term	
	John R. French	R	NC-01	July 6, 1868	1st term	Left the House in 1869.
	Alexander H. Jones	R	NC-07	July 6, 1868	1st term	
	Oliver H. Dockery	R	NC-03	July 13, 1868	1st term	
	David Heaton	R	NC-02	July 15, 1868	1st term	
	W. Jasper Blackburn	R	LA-05	July 18, 1868	1st term	Left the House in 1869.
	Manuel S. Corley	R	SC-03	July 18, 1868	1st term	Left the House in 1869.
	James H. Goss	R	SC-04	July 18, 1868	1st term	Left the House in 1869.
	James Mann	D	LA-02	July 18, 1868	1st term	Died on August 26, 1868.
	Joseph P. Newsham	R	LA-03	July 18, 1868	1st term	Left the House in 1869.
	Benjamin Franklin Whittemore	R	SC-01	July 18, 1868	1st term	
	Michel Vidal	R	LA-04	July 18, 1868	1st term	Left the House in 1869.
	Christopher C. Bowen	R	SC-02	July 20, 1868	1st term	
	Nathaniel Boyden	D	NC-06	July 20, 1868; Previous service, 1847–1849.	2nd term*	Left the House in 1869.
	Israel G. Lash	R	NC-05	July 20, 1868	1st term	
	Charles Waldron Buckley	R	AL-02	July 21, 1868	1st term	
	John B. Callis	R	AL-05	July 21, 1868	1st term	Left the House in 1869.
	Thomas Haughey	R	AL-06	July 21, 1868	1st term	Left the House in 1869.
	Benjamin W. Norris	R	AL-03	July 21, 1868	1st term	Left the House in 1869.
	Charles W. Pierce	R	AL-04	July 21, 1868	1st term	Left the House in 1869.
	Francis W. Kellogg	R	AL-01	July 22, 1868; Previous service, 1859–1865.	4th term*	Left the House in 1869.
	Joseph W. Clift	R	GA-01	July 25, 1868	1st term	Left the House in 1869.
	William P. Edwards	R	GA-03	July 25, 1868	1st term	Left the House in 1869.
	Charles H. Prince	R	GA-05	July 25, 1868	1st term	Left the House in 1869.
	Nelson Tift	D	GA-02	July 25, 1868	1st term	Left the House in 1869.
	Pierce M. B. Young	D	GA-07	July 25, 1868	1st term	Left the House in 1869.
	Oliver J. Dickey	R	PA-09	December 7, 1868	1st term	
	John H. Stover	R	MO-05	December 7, 1868	1st term	Left the House in 1869.
	Solomon Newton Pettis	R	PA-20	December 7, 1868	1st term	Left the House in 1869.
	James T. Elliott	R	AR-02	January 13, 1869	1st term	Left the House in 1869.

== Delegates ==
Rank	Delegate	Party	District	Seniority date (Previous service, if any)	No.# of term(s)	Notes
1	Walter A. Burleigh	R	DAK	March 4, 1865	2nd term	
2	Edward Dexter Holbrook	D	ID	March 4, 1865	2nd term	
3	William Henry Hooper	D	UT	March 4, 1865; Previous service, 1859–1861.	3rd term*	
4	Coles Bashford	R	AZ	March 4, 1867	1st term	
5	James M. Cavanaugh	D	MT	March 4, 1867; Previous service, 1858–1859.	2nd term*	
6	George M. Chilcott	R	CO	March 4, 1867	1st term	
7	Alvan Flanders	R	WA	March 4, 1867	1st term	
	Charles P. Clever	D	NM	September 2, 1867	1st term	
	José Francisco Chaves	R	NM	February 20, 1869; Previous service, 1865–1867.	2nd term*	

== See also ==
- 40th United States Congress
- List of United States congressional districts
- List of United States senators in the 40th Congress
