= 40th United States Congress =

1867-1869 U.S. Congress

←	39th	41st	→
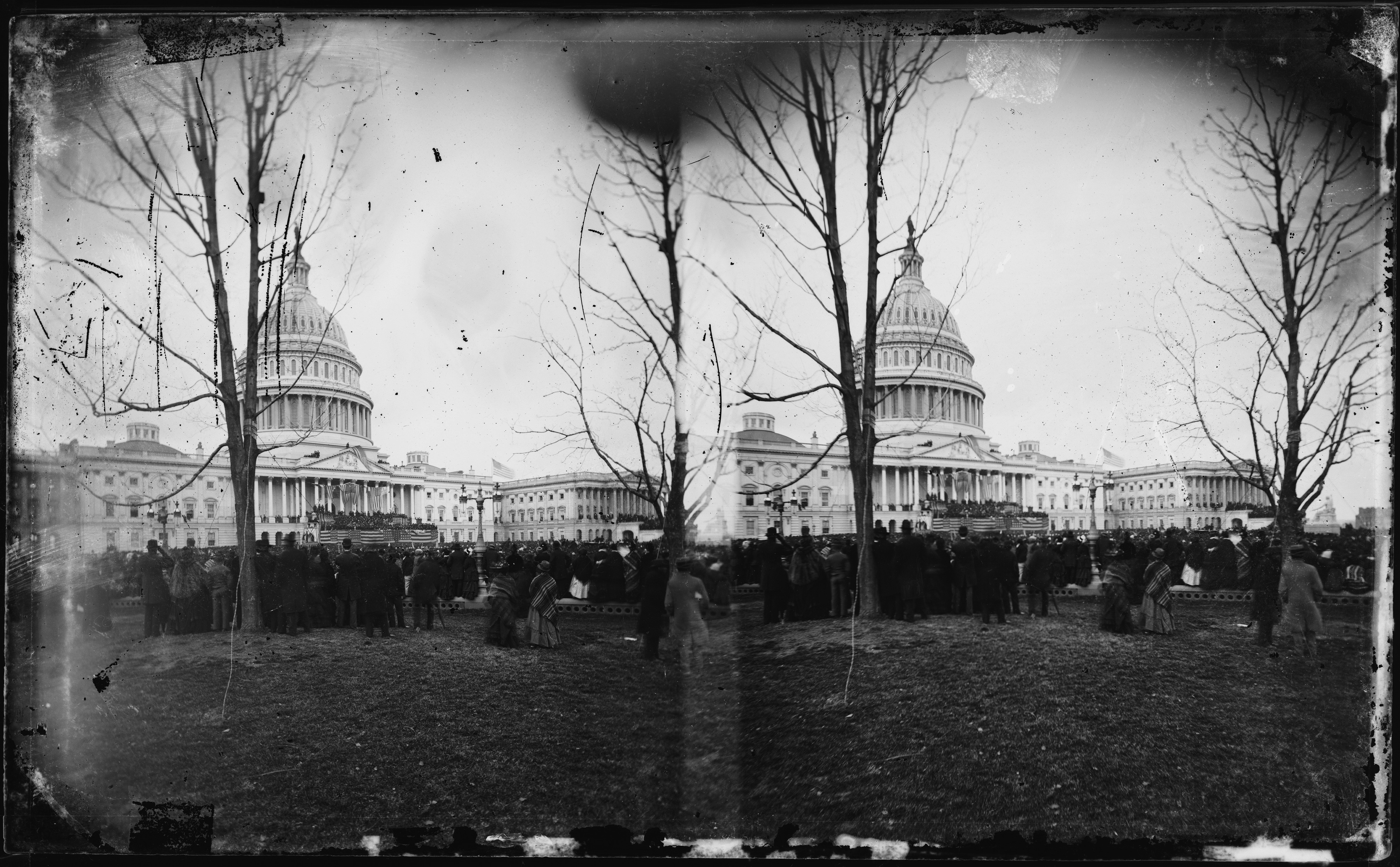
- United States Capitol (1877)

Overview
- Legislative body: United States Congress
- Jurisdiction: United States
- Term: March 4, 1867 – March 4, 1869

Senate
- Members: 68
- President: Vacant (Note: President pro tempore Benjamin Wade acted his duties as the president of the Senate.)
- President pro tempore: Benjamin Wade (R)
- Party control: Republican

House of Representatives
- Members: 226 representatives 8 non-voting delegates
- Speaker: Schuyler Colfax (R); Theodore M. Pomeroy (R)
- Party control: Republican

Sessions
- Special (Note: Special session of the Senate.): April 1, 1867 – April 20, 1867
- 1st: March 4, 1867 – December 1, 1867
- 2nd: December 2, 1867 – November 10, 1868
- 3rd: December 7, 1868 – March 4, 1869

The 40th United States Congress was a meeting of the legislative branch of the United States federal government, consisting of the United States Senate and the United States House of Representatives. It met in Washington, D.C. from March 4, 1867, to March 4, 1869, during the third and fourth years of Andrew Johnson's presidency. The apportionment of seats in the House of Representatives was based on the 1860 United States census. Both chambers had a Republican majority. In the Senate, the Republicans had the largest majority a party has ever held.

This Congress was held during the Reconstruction era after the Civil War and U.S. President Abraham Lincoln's assassination. Arkansas, Florida, Alabama, North Carolina, Louisiana, and South Carolina were readmitted to representation in both the Senate and the House. Georgia was readmitted with representation in the House only. The Republican majority passed an amendment that became the 15th Amendment for voting rights.

== Major events ==
- March 30, 1867: Alaska Purchase
- February 24, 1868: Impeachment of Andrew Johnson
- May 16, 1868: President Johnson acquitted
- May 26, 1868: President Johnson acquitted again
- November 3, 1868: 1868 presidential election: Ulysses S. Grant (R) defeated Horatio Seymour (D)
- December 25, 1868: President Johnson granted unconditional pardons to all Civil War rebels
- January 20, 1869: Elizabeth Cady Stanton was the first woman to testify before Congress

== Major legislation ==
- Three Military Reconstruction Acts, continued:
  - March 23, 1867, ch. 6, 15 Stat. 2
  - July 19, 1867, ch. 30, 15 Stat. 14
  - March 11, 1868, ch. 25, 15 Stat. 41
- July 27, 1868: Expatriation Act of 1868, ch. 249, 15 Stat. 223

== Constitutional amendments ==
- July 10, 1868: Fourteenth Amendment to the United States Constitution declared ratified
- February 26, 1869: Approved an amendment to the Constitution prohibiting the federal and state governments from denying a citizen the right to vote based on that citizen's "race, color, or previous condition of servitude", and submitted it to the state legislatures for ratification
  - Amendment was later ratified on February 3, 1870, becoming the Fifteenth Amendment to the United States Constitution

== Treaty ==
- April 29, 1868: Treaty of Fort Laramie (1868), 15 Stat. 635, signed
- February 16, 1869: Treaty of Fort Laramie (1868) ratified

== Territories organized ==
- July 25, 1868: Wyoming Territory organized, Sess. 2, ch. 135, 15 Stat. 178

== Party summary ==
The count below identifies party affiliations at the beginning of the first session of this Congress, and includes members from vacancies and newly admitted states, when they were first seated. Changes resulting from subsequent replacements are shown below in the "Changes in membership" section.

During this Congress, Arkansas, Florida, Alabama, North Carolina, Louisiana, and South Carolina were readmitted to representation in both the Senate and the House. Georgia was readmitted with representation in the House only.

=== Senate ===
	Party (shading shows control)			Total	Vacant
	Democratic (D)	Republican (R)	Other	Total	Vacant
End of previous congress	8	41	5 (Note: Unionist & Unconditional Unionist)	54	20
Begin	8	45	0	53	21
End	9	57	0	66	8
Final voting share	13.6%	86.4%	0.0%		
Beginning of next congress	9	57	0	66	8

=== House of Representatives ===
	Party (shading shows control)						Total	Vacant
	Democratic (D)	Republican (R)	Independent Republican (IR)	Conservative Republican (CR)	Conservative (C)	Other	Total	Vacant
End of previous congress	41	134	1	0	0	17 (Note: Unionist & Unconditional Unionist)	193	49
Begin	45	143	1	1	1	0	191	52
End	46	172	2	1	2	0	223	20
Final voting share	20.6%	77.1%	0.9%	0.4%	0.9%	0.0%		
Beginning of next congress	65	150	0	0	0	0	215	28

== Leadership ==
=== Senate ===
- President: Vacant
- President pro tempore: Benjamin Wade (R)
- Republican Conference Chairman: Henry B. Anthony
- Democratic Campaign Committee Chairman: James Rood Doolittle

=== House of Representatives ===
- Speaker: Schuyler Colfax (R), until March 3, 1869
  - Theodore M. Pomeroy (R), elected March 3, 1869. Served for 1 day.

== Members ==
This list is arranged by chamber, then by state. Senators are listed by class, and representatives are listed by district.

Skip to House of Representatives, below

=== Senate ===
Senators were elected by the state legislatures every two years, with one-third beginning new six-year terms with each Congress. Preceding the names in the list below are Senate class numbers, which indicate the cycle of their election. In this Congress, Class 1 meant their term ended with this Congress, requiring re-election in 1868 or 1869; Class 2 meant their term began in the last Congress, requiring re-election in 1870 or 1871; and Class 3 meant their term began in this Congress, requiring re-election in 1872 or 1873.

==== Alabama ====
▌2. Willard Warner (R), from July 13, 1868
▌3. George E. Spencer (R), from July 13, 1868

==== Arkansas ====
▌2. Alexander McDonald (R), from June 22, 1868
▌3. Benjamin F. Rice (R), from June 23, 1868

==== California ====
▌1. John Conness (R)
▌3. Cornelius Cole (R)

==== Connecticut ====
▌1. James Dixon (R)
▌3. Orris S. Ferry (R)

==== Delaware ====
▌1. George Read Riddle (D), until March 29, 1867

▌ James A. Bayard Jr. (D), from April 11, 1867

▌2. Willard Saulsbury Sr. (D)

==== Florida ====
▌1. Adonijah Welch (R), from June 17, 1868
▌3. Thomas W. Osborn (R), from June 25, 1868

==== Georgia ====
2. Vacant
3. Vacant

==== Illinois ====
▌2. Richard Yates (R)
▌3. Lyman Trumbull (R)

==== Indiana ====
▌1. Thomas A. Hendricks (D)
▌3. Oliver H. P. T. Morton (R)

==== Iowa ====
▌2. James W. Grimes (R)
▌3. James Harlan (R)

==== Kansas ====
▌2. Edmund G. Ross (R)
▌3. Samuel C. Pomeroy (R)

==== Kentucky ====
▌2. James Guthrie (D), until February 7, 1868

▌ Thomas C. McCreery (D), from February 19, 1868

▌3. Garrett Davis (D)

==== Louisiana ====
▌2. John S. Harris (R), from July 8, 1868
▌3. William Pitt Kellogg (R), from July 9, 1868

==== Maine ====
▌1. Lot M. Morrill (R)
▌2. William P. Fessenden (R)

==== Maryland ====
▌1. Reverdy Johnson (D), until July 10, 1868

▌ William Pinkney Whyte (D), from July 13, 1868

▌3. George Vickers (D), from March 7, 1868

==== Massachusetts ====
▌1. Charles Sumner (R)
▌2. Henry Wilson (R)

==== Michigan ====
▌1. Zachariah Chandler (R)
▌2. Jacob M. Howard (R)

==== Minnesota ====
▌1. Alexander Ramsey (R)
▌2. Daniel S. Norton (R)

==== Mississippi ====
1. Vacant
2. Vacant

==== Missouri ====
▌1. John B. Henderson (R)
▌3. Charles D. Drake (R)

==== Nebraska ====
▌1. Thomas Tipton (R)
▌2. John M. Thayer (R)

==== Nevada ====
▌1. William M. Stewart (R)
▌3. James W. Nye (R)

==== New Hampshire ====
▌2. Aaron H. Cragin (R)
▌3. James W. Patterson (R)

==== New Jersey ====
▌1. Frederick T. Frelinghuysen (R)
▌2. Alexander G. Cattell (R)

==== New York ====
▌1. Edwin D. Morgan (R)
▌3. Roscoe Conkling (R)

==== North Carolina ====
▌2. Joseph C. Abbott (R), from July 14, 1868
▌3. John Pool (R), from July 14, 1868

==== Ohio ====
▌1. Benjamin Wade (R)
▌3. John Sherman (R)

==== Oregon ====
▌2. George H. Williams (R)
▌3. Henry W. Corbett (R)

==== Pennsylvania ====
▌1. Charles R. Buckalew (D)
▌3. Simon Cameron (R)

==== Rhode Island ====
▌1. William Sprague IV (R)
▌2. Henry B. Anthony (R)

==== South Carolina ====
▌2. Thomas J. Robertson (R), from July 15, 1868
▌3. Frederick A. Sawyer (R), from July 16, 1868

==== Tennessee ====
▌1. David T. Patterson (D)
▌2. Joseph S. Fowler (R)

==== Texas ====
1. Vacant
2. Vacant

==== Vermont ====
▌1. George F. Edmunds (R)
▌3. Justin S. Morrill (R)

==== Virginia ====
1. Vacant
2. Vacant

==== West Virginia ====
▌1. Peter G. Van Winkle (R)
▌2. Waitman T. Willey (R)

==== Wisconsin ====
▌1. James R. Doolittle (R)
▌3. Timothy O. Howe (R)

Senators' party membership by state at the opening of the 40th Congress in March 1867. The senators from Alabama, Arkansas, Florida, Louisiana, North Carolina, and South Carolina were not seated until later in the Congress. 2 Democrats 1 Democrat and 1 Republican 2 Republicans Territories

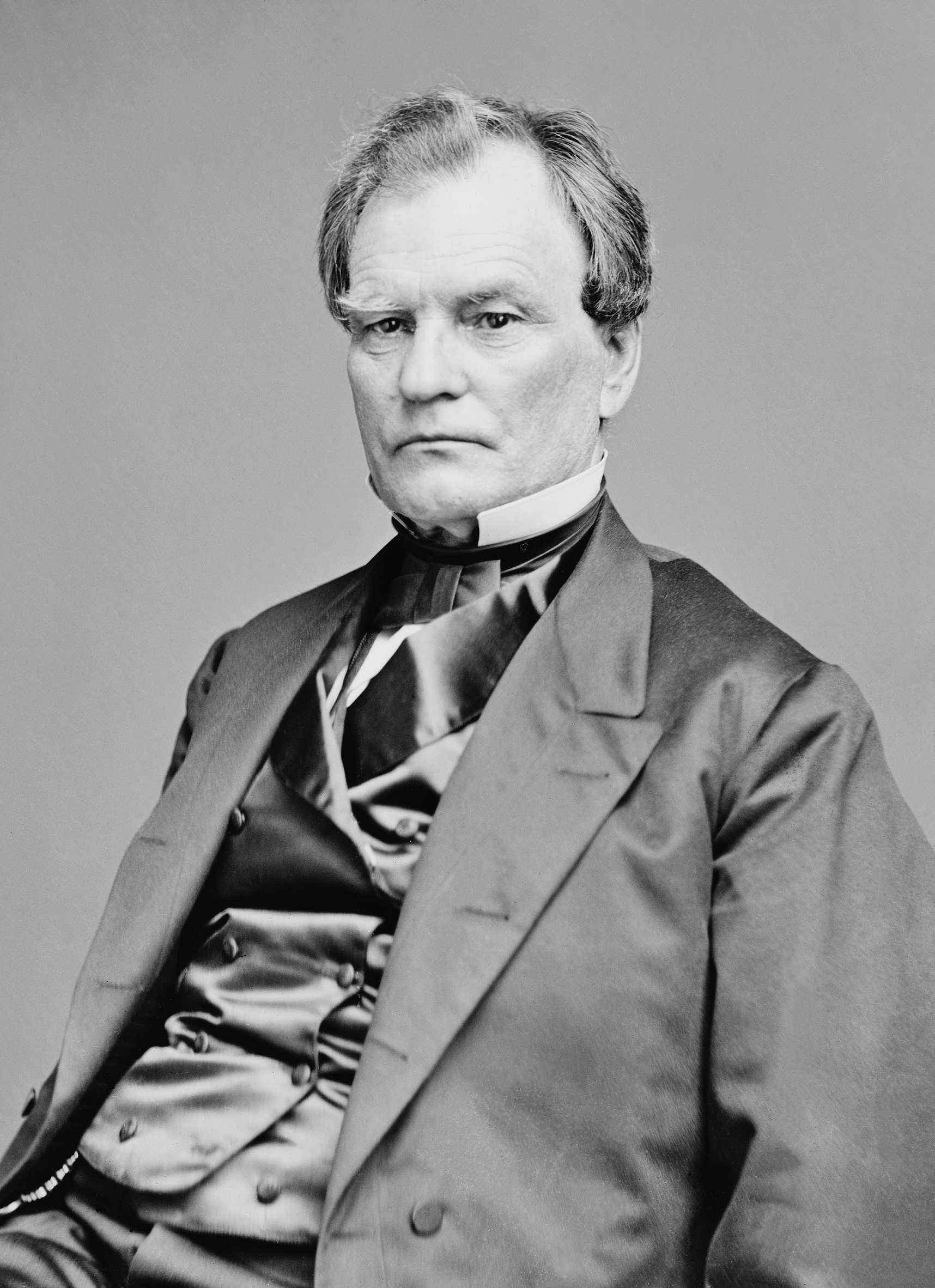
President pro tempore Benjamin F. Wade

=== House of Representatives ===
The names of representatives are preceded by their district numbers.

==== Alabama ====
▌ 1. Francis W. Kellogg (R), from July 22, 1868
▌ 2. Charles W. Buckley (R), from July 21, 1868
▌ 3. Benjamin W. Norris (R), from July 21, 1868
▌ 4. Charles W. Pierce (R), from July 21, 1868
▌ 5. John B. Callis (R), from July 21, 1868
▌ 6. Thomas Haughey (R), from July 21, 1868

==== Arkansas ====
▌ 1. Logan H. Roots (R), from June 22, 1868
▌ 2. James M. Hinds (R), June 22, 1868 – October 22, 1868

▌ James T. Elliott (R), from January 13, 1869

▌ 3. Thomas Boles (R), from June 22, 1868

==== California ====
▌ 1. Samuel B. Axtell (D)
▌ 2. William Higby (R)
▌ 3. James A. Johnson (D)

==== Connecticut ====
▌ 1. Richard D. Hubbard (D)
▌ 2. Julius Hotchkiss (D)
▌ 3. Henry H. Starkweather (R)
▌ 4. William H. Barnum (D)

==== Delaware ====
▌ At-large. John A. Nicholson (D)

==== Florida ====
▌ At-large. Charles M. Hamilton (R), from July 1, 1868

==== Georgia ====
▌ 1. Joseph W. Clift (R), from July 25, 1868
▌ 2. Nelson Tift (D), from July 25, 1868
▌ 3. William P. Edwards (R), from July 25, 1868
▌ 4. Samuel F. Gove (R), from July 25, 1868
▌ 5. Charles H. Prince (R), from July 25, 1868
6. Vacant
▌ 7. Pierce M. B. Young (D), from July 25, 1868

==== Illinois ====
▌ 1. Norman B. Judd (R)
▌ 2. John F. Farnsworth (R)
▌ 3. Elihu B. Washburne (R)
▌ 4. Abner C. Harding (R)
▌ 5. Ebon C. Ingersoll (R)
▌ 6. Burton C. Cook (R)
▌ 7. Henry P. H. Bromwell (R)
▌ 8. Shelby M. Cullom (R)
▌ 9. Lewis Winans Ross (D)
▌ 10. Albert G. Burr (D)
▌ 11. Samuel S. Marshall (D)
▌ 12. Jehu Baker (R)
▌ 13. Green B. Raum (R)
▌ At-large. John A. Logan (R)

==== Indiana ====
▌ 1. William E. Niblack (D)
▌ 2. Michael C. Kerr (D)
▌ 3. Morton C. Hunter (R)
▌ 4. William S. Holman (D)
▌ 5. George W. Julian (R)
▌ 6. John Coburn (R)
▌ 7. Henry D. Washburn (R)
▌ 8. Godlove S. Orth (R)
▌ 9. Schuyler Colfax (R)
▌ 10. William Williams (R)
▌ 11. John P. C. Shanks (R)

==== Iowa ====
▌ 1. James F. Wilson (R)
▌ 2. Hiram Price (R)
▌ 3. William B. Allison (R)
▌ 4. William Loughridge (R)
▌ 5. Grenville M. Dodge (R)
▌ 6. Asahel W. Hubbard (R)

==== Kansas ====
▌ At-large. Sidney Clarke (R)

==== Kentucky ====
▌ 1. Lawrence S. Trimble (D)
2. Vacant
▌ 3. Elijah Hise (D), until May 8, 1867

▌ Jacob Golladay (D), from December 5, 1867

▌ 4. J. Proctor Knott (D)
▌ 5. Asa Grover (D)
▌ 6. Thomas L. Jones (D)
▌ 7. James B. Beck (D)
▌ 8. George M. Adams (D)
▌ 9. Samuel McKee (R), from June 22, 1868

==== Louisiana ====
▌ 1. J. Hale Sypher (R), from July 18, 1868
▌ 2. James Mann (D), July 18, 1868 – August 26, 1868
▌ 3. Joseph P. Newsham (R), from July 18, 1868
▌ 4. Michel Vidal (R), from July 18, 1868
▌ 5. W. Jasper Blackburn (R), from July 18, 1868

==== Maine ====
▌ 1. John Lynch (R)
▌ 2. Sidney Perham (R)
▌ 3. James G. Blaine (R)
▌ 4. John A. Peters (R)
▌ 5. Frederick A. Pike (R)

==== Maryland ====
▌ 1. Hiram McCullough (D)
▌ 2. Stevenson Archer (D)
▌ 3. Charles E. Phelps (C)
▌ 4. Francis Thomas (R)
▌ 5. Frederick Stone (D)

==== Massachusetts ====
▌ 1. Thomas D. Eliot (R)
▌ 2. Oakes Ames (R)
▌ 3. Ginery Twichell (R)
▌ 4. Samuel Hooper (R)
▌ 5. Benjamin F. Butler (R)
▌ 6. Nathaniel P. Banks (R)
▌ 7. George S. Boutwell (R)
▌ 8. John D. Baldwin (R)
▌ 9. William B. Washburn (R)
▌ 10. Henry L. Dawes (R)

==== Michigan ====
▌ 1. Fernando C. Beaman (R)
▌ 2. Charles Upson (R)
▌ 3. Austin Blair (R)
▌ 4. Thomas W. Ferry (R)
▌ 5. Rowland E. Trowbridge (R)
▌ 6. John F. Driggs (R)

==== Minnesota ====
▌ 1. William Windom (R)
▌ 2. Ignatius L. Donnelly (R)

==== Mississippi ====
1. Vacant
2. Vacant
3. Vacant
4. Vacant
5. Vacant

==== Missouri ====
▌ 1. William A. Pile (R)
▌ 2. Carman A. Newcomb (R)
▌ 3. Thomas E. Noell (D), until October 3, 1867

▌ James R. McCormick (D), from December 17, 1867

▌ 4. Joseph J. Gravely (R)
▌ 5. Joseph W. McClurg (R), until July 1868

▌ John H. Stover (R), from December 7, 1868

▌ 6. Robert T. Van Horn (R)
▌ 7. Benjamin F. Loan (R)
▌ 8. John F. Benjamin (R)
▌ 9. George W. Anderson (R)

==== Nebraska ====
▌ At-large. John Taffe (R)

==== Nevada ====
▌ At-large. Delos R. Ashley (R)

==== New Hampshire ====
▌ 1. Jacob H. Ela (R)
▌ 2. Aaron F. Stevens (R)
▌ 3. Jacob Benton (R)

==== New Jersey ====
▌ 1. William Moore (R)
▌ 2. Charles Haight (D)
▌ 3. Charles Sitgreaves (D)
▌ 4. John Hill (R)
▌ 5. George A. Halsey (R)

==== New York ====
▌ 1. Stephen Taber (D)
▌ 2. Demas Barnes (D)
▌ 3. William E. Robinson (D)
▌ 4. John Fox (D)
▌ 5. John Morrissey (D)
▌ 6. Thomas E. Stewart (CR)
▌ 7. John W. Chanler (D)
▌ 8. James Brooks (D)
▌ 9. Fernando Wood (D)
▌ 10. William H. Robertson (R)
▌ 11. Charles H. Van Wyck (R)
▌ 12. John H. Ketcham (R)
▌ 13. Thomas Cornell (R)
▌ 14. John V. L. Pruyn (D)
▌ 15. John Augustus Griswold (R)
▌ 16. Orange Ferriss (R)
▌ 17. Calvin T. Hulburd (R)
▌ 18. James M. Marvin (R)
▌ 19. William C. Fields (R)
▌ 20. Addison H. Laflin (R)
▌ 21. Roscoe Conkling (R), until March 4, 1867

▌ Alexander H. Bailey (R), from November 30, 1867

▌ 22. John C. Churchill (R)
▌ 23. Dennis McCarthy (R)
▌ 24. Theodore M. Pomeroy (R)
▌ 25. William H. Kelsey (R)
▌ 26. William S. Lincoln (R)
▌ 27. Hamilton Ward Sr. (R)
▌ 28. Lewis Selye (IR)
▌ 29. Burt Van Horn (R)
▌ 30. James M. Humphrey (D)
▌ 31. Henry H. Van Aernam (R)

==== North Carolina ====
▌ 1. John R. French (R), from July 15, 1868
▌ 2. David Heaton (R), from July 25, 1868
▌ 3. Oliver H. Dockery (R), from July 13, 1868
▌ 4. John T. Deweese (R), from July 6, 1868
▌ 5. Israel G. Lash (R), from July 20, 1868
▌ 6. Nathaniel Boyden (C), from July 13, 1868
▌ 7. Alexander H. Jones (R), from July 6, 1868

==== Ohio ====
▌ 1. Benjamin Eggleston (R)
▌ 2. Rutherford B. Hayes (R), until July 20, 1867

▌ Samuel F. Cary (IR), from November 21, 1867

▌ 3. Robert C. Schenck (R)
▌ 4. William Lawrence (R)
▌ 5. William Mungen (D)
▌ 6. Reader W. Clarke (R)
▌ 7. Samuel Shellabarger (R)
▌ 8. Cornelius S. Hamilton (R), until December 22, 1867

▌ John Beatty (R), from February 5, 1868

▌ 9. Ralph P. Buckland (R)
▌ 10. James M. Ashley (R)
▌ 11. John T. Wilson (R)
▌ 12. Philadelph Van Trump (D)
▌ 13. George W. Morgan (D), until June 3, 1868

▌ Columbus Delano (R), from June 3, 1868

▌ 14. Martin Welker (R)
▌ 15. Tobias A. Plants (R)
▌ 16. John Bingham (R)
▌ 17. Ephraim R. Eckley (R)
▌ 18. Rufus P. Spalding (R)
▌ 19. James A. Garfield (R)

==== Oregon ====
▌ At-large. Rufus Mallory (R)

==== Pennsylvania ====
▌ 1. Samuel J. Randall (D)
▌ 2. Charles O'Neill (R)
▌ 3. Leonard Myers (R)
▌ 4. William D. Kelley (R)
▌ 5. Caleb N. Taylor (R)
▌ 6. Benjamin M. Boyer (D)
▌ 7. John M. Broomall (R)
▌ 8. J. Lawrence Getz (D)
▌ 9. Thaddeus Stevens (R), until August 11, 1868

▌ Oliver J. Dickey (R), from December 7, 1868

▌ 10. Henry L. Cake (R)
▌ 11. Daniel M. Van Auken (D)
▌ 12. Charles Denison (D), until June 27, 1867

▌ George W. Woodward (D), from November 21, 1867

▌ 13. Ulysses Mercur (R)
▌ 14. George F. Miller (R)
▌ 15. Adam J. Glossbrenner (D)
▌ 16. William H. Koontz (R)
▌ 17. Daniel J. Morrell (R)
▌ 18. Stephen F. Wilson (R)
▌ 19. Glenni W. Scofield (R)
▌ 20. Darwin A. Finney (R), until August 25, 1868

▌ S. Newton Pettis (R), from December 7, 1868

▌ 21. John Covode (R)
▌ 22. James K. Moorhead (R)
▌ 23. Thomas Williams (R)
▌ 24. George V. Lawrence (R)

==== Rhode Island ====
▌ 1. Thomas Jenckes (R)
▌ 2. Nathan F. Dixon Jr. (R)

==== South Carolina ====
▌ 1. B. Frank Whittemore (R), from July 18, 1868
▌ 2. Christopher C. Bowen (R), from July 18, 1868
▌ 3. M. Simeon Corley (R), from July 25, 1868
▌ 4. James H. Goss (R), from July 18, 1868

==== Tennessee ====
▌ 1. Roderick R. Butler (R)
▌ 2. Horace Maynard (R)
▌ 3. William B. Stokes (R)
▌ 4. James Mullins (R)
▌ 5. John Trimble (R)
▌ 6. Samuel M. Arnell (R)
▌ 7. Isaac R. Hawkins (R)
▌ 8. David A. Nunn (R)

==== Texas ====
1. Vacant
2. Vacant
3. Vacant
4. Vacant

==== Vermont ====
▌ 1. Frederick E. Woodbridge (R)
▌ 2. Luke P. Poland (R)
▌ 3. Worthington C. Smith (R)

==== Virginia ====
1. Vacant
2. Vacant
3. Vacant
4. Vacant
5. Vacant
6. Vacant
7. Vacant
8. Vacant

==== West Virginia ====
▌ 1. Chester D. Hubbard (R)
▌ 2. Bethuel Kitchen (R)
▌ 3. Daniel Polsley (R)

==== Wisconsin ====
▌ 1. Halbert E. Paine (R)
▌ 2. Benjamin F. Hopkins (R)
▌ 3. Amasa Cobb (R)
▌ 4. Charles A. Eldredge (D)
▌ 5. Philetus Sawyer (R)
▌ 6. Cadwallader C. Washburn (R)

==== Non-voting members ====
▌ Arizona Territory. Coles Bashford (I)
▌ Colorado Territory. George M. Chilcott (R)
▌ Dakota Territory. Walter A. Burleigh (R)
▌ Idaho Territory. Edward D. Holbrook (D)
▌ Montana Territory. James M. Cavanaugh (D)
▌ New Mexico Territory. Charles P. Clever (D), from September 2, 1867 - February 20, 1869

▌ J. Francisco Chaves (R), from February 20, 1869

▌ Utah Territory. William H. Hooper (D)
▌ Washington Territory. Alvan Flanders (R)

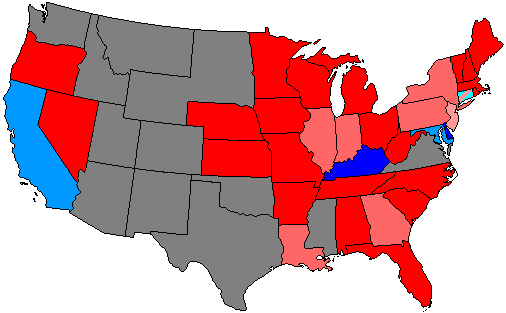
House seats by party holding plurality in state: 80+% Democratic / 80+% Republican; 60+% to 80% Democratic / 60+% to 80% Republican; Up to 60% Democratic / Up to 60% Republican

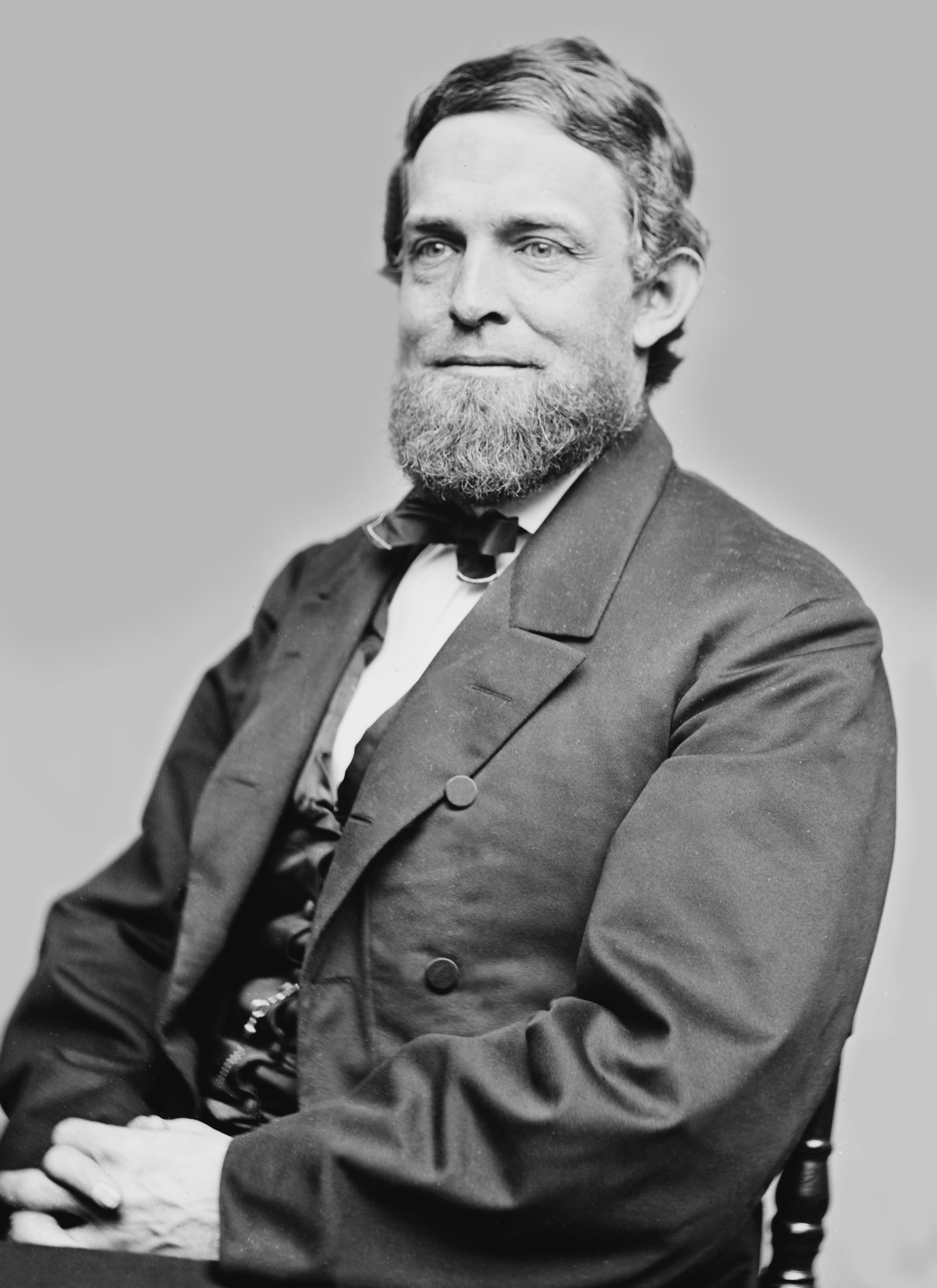
Speaker of the House Schuyler Colfax

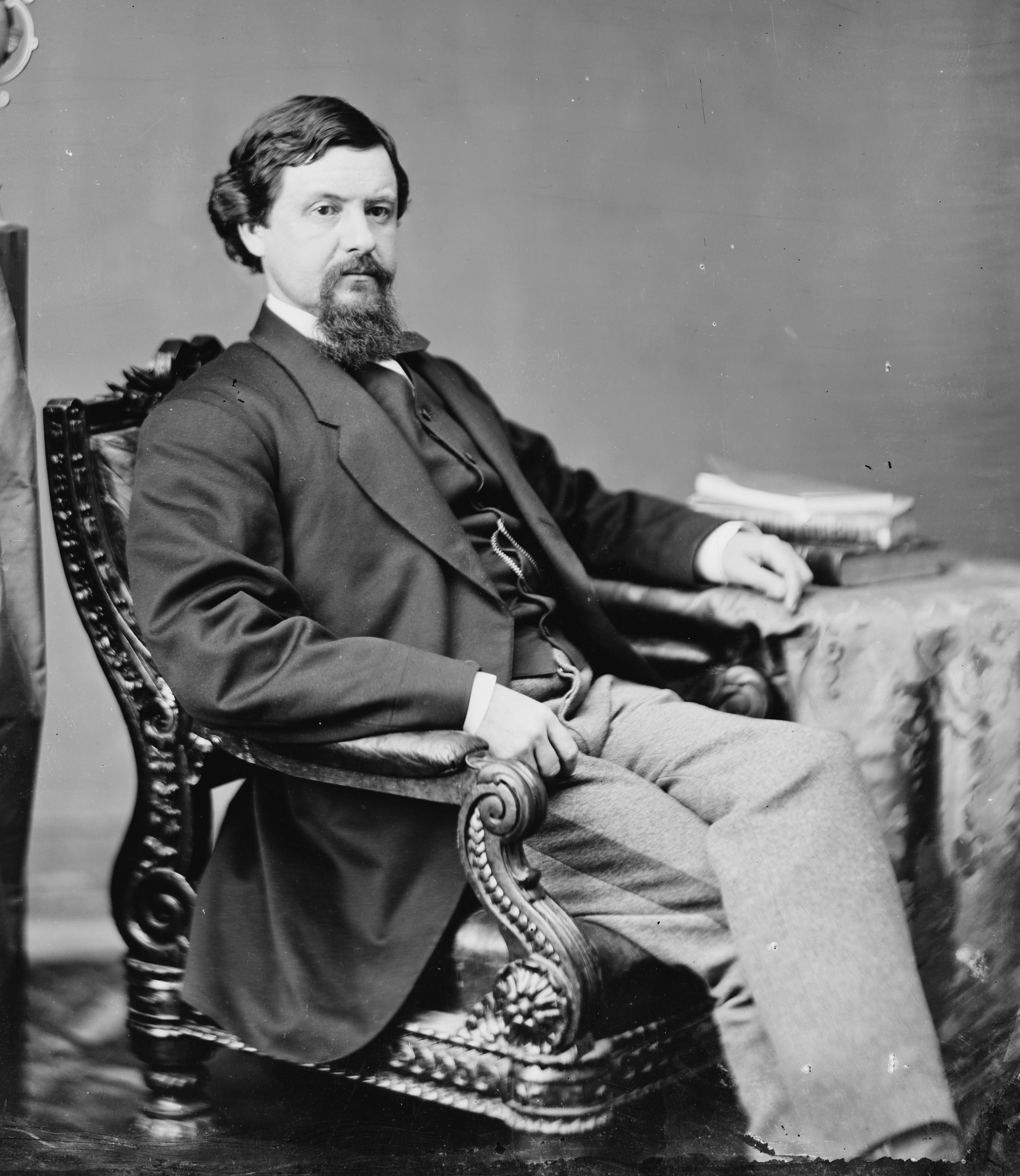
Speaker of the House Theodore M. Pomeroy

== Changes in membership ==
The count below reflects changes from the beginning of the first session of this Congress.

=== Senate ===
- Replacements: 3
  - Democratic: 0 seat net loss
  - Republican: 0 seat net gain
- Deaths: 1
- Resignations: 2
- Interim appointments: 1
- Seats from newly re-admitted states: 12
- Total seats with changes: 16

Senate changes
State (class)	Vacated by	Reason for change	Successor	Date of successor's formal installation (Note: When seated or oath administered, not necessarily when service began.)
Delaware (1)	George R. Riddle (D)	Died March 29, 1867. Successor appointed April 5, 1867. Appointee was subsequently elected January 19, 1869, to finish the term.	James A. Bayard Jr. (D)	April 5, 1867
Kentucky (2)	James Guthrie (D)	Resigned February 7, 1868, because of failing health. Successor elected February 19, 1868.	Thomas C. McCreery (D)	February 19, 1868
Maryland (3)	Vacant	Filled vacancy caused by action of the Senate in declining to permit Philip F. Thomas to qualify. Successor elected March 7, 1868.	George Vickers (D)	March 7, 1868
Florida (1)	Vacant	Florida re-admitted to the Union	Adonijah Welch (R)	June 17, 1868
Arkansas (2)	Vacant	Arkansas re-admitted to the Union	Alexander McDonald (R)	June 22, 1868
Arkansas (3)	Vacant	Arkansas re-admitted to the Union	Benjamin F. Rice (R)	June 23, 1868
Florida (3)	Vacant	Florida re-admitted to the Union	Thomas W. Osborn (R)	June 25, 1868
Louisiana (2)	Vacant	Louisiana re-admitted to the Union	John S. Harris (R)	July 8, 1868
Louisiana (3)	Vacant	Louisiana re-admitted to the Union	William P. Kellogg (R)	July 9, 1868
Alabama (2)	Vacant	Alabama re-admitted to the Union	Willard Warner (R)	July 13, 1868
Alabama (3)	Vacant	Alabama re-admitted to the Union	George E. Spencer (R)	July 13, 1868
Maryland (1)	Reverdy Johnson (D)	Resigned July 10, 1868, to become U.S. Ambassador to the United Kingdom of Great Britain and Ireland. Successor appointed July 13, 1868.	William P. Whyte (D)	July 13, 1868
North Carolina (2)	Vacant	North Carolina re-admitted to the Union	Joseph C. Abbott (R)	July 14, 1868
North Carolina (3)	Vacant	North Carolina re-admitted to the Union	John Pool (R)	July 14, 1868
South Carolina (2)	Vacant	South Carolina re-admitted to the Union	Thomas J. Robertson (R)	July 15, 1868
South Carolina (3)	Vacant	South Carolina re-admitted to the Union	Frederick A. Sawyer (R)	July 16, 1868

=== House of Representatives ===
- Replacements: 10
  - Democratic: 2 seat net loss
  - Republican: 0 seat net gain
  - Independent Republican: 1 seat net gain
  - Conservative: 0 seat net gain
- Deaths: 8
- Resignations: 3
- Contested election: 3
- Seats from re-admitted states: 32
- Total seats with changes: 44

House changes
District	Vacated by	Reason for change	Successor	Date of successor's formal installation
New Mexico Territory At-large	Vacant	Vacancy in term	Charles P. Clever (D)	September 2, 1867
Arkansas 1st	Vacant	Arkansas re-admitted into the Union	Logan H. Roots (R)	June 22, 1868
Arkansas 2nd	Vacant	Arkansas re-admitted into the Union	James M. Hinds (R)	June 22, 1868
Arkansas 3rd	Vacant	Arkansas re-admitted into the Union	Thomas Boles (R)	June 22, 1868
Kentucky 9th	Vacant	John D. Young presented credentials but failed to qualify. Election was contested by McKee.	Samuel McKee (R)	June 22, 1868
Florida At-large	Vacant	Florida re-admitted into the Union	Charles M. Hamilton (R)	July 1, 1868
North Carolina 4th	Vacant	North Carolina re-admitted into the Union	John T. Deweese (R)	July 6, 1868
North Carolina 7th	Vacant	North Carolina re-admitted into the Union	Alexander H. Jones (R)	July 6, 1868
North Carolina 3rd	Vacant	North Carolina re-admitted into the Union	Oliver H. Dockery (R)	July 13, 1868
North Carolina 6th	Vacant	North Carolina re-admitted into the Union	Nathaniel Boyden (C)	July 13, 1868
North Carolina 1st	Vacant	North Carolina re-admitted into the Union	John R. French (R)	July 15, 1868
Louisiana 1st	Vacant	Louisiana re-admitted into the Union	J. Hale Sypher (R)	July 18, 1868
Louisiana 2nd	Vacant	Louisiana re-admitted into the Union	James Mann (D)	July 18, 1868
Louisiana 3rd	Vacant	Louisiana re-admitted into the Union	Joseph P. Newsham (R)	July 18, 1868
Louisiana 4th	Vacant	Louisiana re-admitted into the Union	Michel Vidal (R)	July 18, 1868
Louisiana 5th	Vacant	Louisiana re-admitted into the Union	W. Jasper Blackburn (R)	July 18, 1868
South Carolina 1st	Vacant	South Carolina re-admitted into the Union	Benjamin F. Whittemore (R)	July 18, 1868
South Carolina 2nd	Vacant	South Carolina re-admitted into the Union	Christopher C. Bowen (R)	July 18, 1868
South Carolina 4th	Vacant	South Carolina re-admitted into the Union	James H. Goss (R)	July 18, 1868
North Carolina 5th	Vacant	North Carolina re-admitted into the Union	Israel G. Lash (R)	July 20, 1868
Alabama 2nd	Vacant	Alabama re-admitted into the Union	Charles W. Buckley (R)	July 21, 1868
Alabama 3rd	Vacant	Alabama re-admitted into the Union	Benjamin W. Norris (R)	July 21, 1868
Alabama 4th	Vacant	Alabama re-admitted into the Union	Charles W. Pierce (R)	July 21, 1868
Alabama 5th	Vacant	Alabama re-admitted into the Union	John B. Callis (R)	July 21, 1868
Alabama 6th	Vacant	Alabama re-admitted into the Union	Thomas Haughey (R)	July 21, 1868
Alabama 1st	Vacant	Alabama re-admitted into the Union	Francis W. Kellogg (R)	July 22, 1868
Georgia 1st	Vacant	Georgia re-admitted into the Union	Joseph W. Clift (R)	July 25, 1868
Georgia 2nd	Vacant	Georgia re-admitted into the Union	Nelson Tift (D)	July 25, 1868
Georgia 3rd	Vacant	Georgia re-admitted into the Union	William P. Edwards (R)	July 25, 1868
Georgia 4th	Vacant	Georgia re-admitted into the Union	Samuel F. Gove (R)	July 25, 1868
Georgia 5th	Vacant	Georgia re-admitted into the Union	Charles H. Prince (R)	July 25, 1868
Georgia 7th	Vacant	Georgia re-admitted into the Union	Pierce M. B. Young (D)	July 25, 1868
North Carolina 2nd	Vacant	North Carolina re-admitted into the Union	David Heaton (R)	July 25, 1868
South Carolina 1st	Vacant	South Carolina re-admitted into the Union	Manuel S. Corley (R)	July 25, 1868
New York 21st	Roscoe Conkling (R)	Resigned March 4, 1867, after being elected to the US Senate	Alexander H. Bailey (R)	November 30, 1867
Kentucky 3rd	Elijah Hise (D)	Died May 8, 1867	Jacob Golladay (D)	December 5, 1867
Pennsylvania 12th	Charles Denison (D)	Died June 27, 1867	George W. Woodward (D)	November 21, 1867
Ohio 2nd	Rutherford B. Hayes (R)	Resigned July 20, 1867, after being nominated Governor of Ohio	Samuel F. Cary (IR)	November 21, 1867
Missouri 3rd	Thomas E. Noell (D)	Died October 3, 1867	James R. McCormick (D)	December 17, 1867
Ohio 8th	Cornelius S. Hamilton (R)	Killed by insane son December 22, 1867	John Beatty (R)	February 5, 1868
Ohio 13th	George W. Morgan (D)	Lost contested election June 3, 1868	Columbus Delano (R)	June 3, 1868
Missouri 5th	Joseph W. McClurg (R)	Resigned in July 1868	John H. Stover (R)	December 7, 1868
Pennsylvania 9th	Thaddeus Stevens (R)	Died August 11, 1868	Oliver J. Dickey (R)	December 7, 1868
Pennsylvania 20th	Darwin A. Finney (R)	Died August 25, 1868	S. Newton Pettis (R)	December 7, 1868
Louisiana 2nd	James Mann (D)	Died August 26, 1868	Vacant	Not filled this term
Arkansas 2nd	James M. Hinds (R)	Assassinated October 22, 1868	James T. Elliott (R)	January 13, 1869
New Mexico Territory At-large	Charles P. Clever (D)	Lost contested election February 20, 1869	J. Francisco Chaves (R)	February 20, 1869

== Committees ==
Lists of committees and their party leaders for members of the House and Senate committees can be found through the Official Congressional Directory at the bottom of this article. The directory after the pages of terms of service lists committees of the Senate, House (Standing with Subcommittees, Select and Special) and Joint and, after that, House/Senate committee assignments. On the committees section of the House and Senate in the Official Congressional Directory, the committee's members on the first row on the left side shows the chairman of the committee and on the right side shows the ranking member of the committee.

=== Senate ===
- Agriculture (Chairman: Simon Cameron; Ranking Member: Thomas W. Tipton)
- Appropriations (Chairman: Lot M. Morrill; Ranking Member: Cornelius Cole)
- Audit and Control the Contingent Expenses of the Senate (Chairman: Aaron H. Cragin; Ranking Member: Charles R. Buckalew)
- Claims (Chairman: Timothy O. Howe; Ranking Member: Justin S. Morrill)
- Commerce (Chairman: Zachariah Chandler; Ranking Member: Henry W. Corbett)
- Distributing Public Revenue Among the States (Select)
- District of Columbia (Chairman: James Harlan; Ranking Member: James W. Patterson)
- Education
- Engrossed Bills (Chairman: Joseph S. Fowler; Ranking Member: Daniel S. Norton)
- Finance (Chairman: John Sherman; Ranking Member: Alexander G. Cattell)
- Foreign Relations (Chairman: Charles Sumner; Ranking Member: Oliver P. Morton)
- Impeachment of President Andrew Johnson (Select)
- Impeachment Trial Investigation (Select)
- Indian Affairs (Chairman: John B. Henderson; Ranking Member: John M. Thayer)
- Judiciary (Chairman: Lyman Trumbull; Ranking Member: Roscoe Conkling)
- Manufactures (Chairman: William Sprague IV; Ranking Member: Cornelius Cole)
- Military Affairs and the Militia (Chairman: Henry Wilson; Ranking Member: Oliver P. Morton)
- Mines and Mining (Chairman: John Conness; Ranking Member: Richard Yates)
- Naval Affairs (Chairman: James W. Grimes; Ranking Member: Frederick T. Frelinghuysen)
- Ninth Census (Select)
- Ordnance and War Ships (Select) (Chairman: Jacob M. Howard; Ranking Member: Charles D. Drake)
- Pacific Railroad (Chairman: Jacob M. Howard; Ranking Member: William M. Stewart)
- Patents and the Patent Office (Chairman: Waitman T. Willey; Ranking Member: Orris S. Ferry)
- Pensions (Chairman: Peter G. Van Winkle; Ranking Member: Thomas W. Tipton)
- Post Office and Post Roads (Chairman: Alexander Ramsey; Ranking Member: James Harlan)
- Private Land Claims (Chairman: Godlove Stein Orth; Ranking Member: Daniel S. Norton)
- Public Buildings and Grounds (Chairman: William P. Fessenden; Ranking Member: Orris S. Ferry)
- Public Lands (Chairman: Samuel C. Pomeroy; Ranking Member: George H. Williams)
- Representative Reform (Select)
- Retrenchment (Chairman: George F. Edmunds; Ranking Member: James W. Patterson)
- Revision of the Laws (Chairman: Roscoe Conkling; Ranking Member: N/A)
- Revolutionary Claims (Chairman: James W. Nye; Ranking Member: David T. Patterson)
- Rules
- Tariff Regulation (Select)
- Territories (Chairman: Richard Yates; Ranking Member: Alexander Ramsey)
- Treasury Printing Bureau (Select)
- Whole

=== House of Representatives ===
- Accounts (Chairman: John M. Broomall; Ranking Member: William C. Fields)
- Agriculture (Chairman: Rowland E. Trowbridge; Ranking Member: John T. Wilson)
- Appropriations (Chairman: Thaddeus Stevens; Ranking Member: Benjamin F. Butler)
- Banking and Currency (Chairman: Theodore M. Pomeroy; Ranking Member: Norman B. Judd)
- Claims (Chairman: John A. Bingham; Ranking Member: Amasa Cobb)
- Coinage, Weights and Measures (Chairman: William D. Kelley; Ranking Member: John Hill)
- Commerce (Chairman: Elihu B. Washburne; Ranking Member: James M. Humphrey)
- District of Columbia (Chairman: Ebon C. Ingersoll; Ranking Member: Fernando Wood)
- Education and Labor (Chairman: Jehu Baker; Ranking Member: Thomas Cornell)
- Elections (Chairman: Henry L. Dawes; Ranking Member: Burton C. Cook)
- Expenditures in the Interior Department (Chairman: Chester D. Hubbard; Ranking Member: Ginery Twichell)
- Expenditures in the Navy Department (Chairman: Charles Upson; Ranking Member: Francis Thomas)
- Expenditures in the Post Office Department (Chairman: William A. Pile; Ranking Member: John H. Ketcham)
- Expenditures in the State Department (Chairman: Samuel M. Arnell; Ranking Member: Reader W. Clarke)
- Expenditures in the Treasury Department (Chairman: James M. Marvin; Ranking Member: Bethuel M. Kitchen)
- Expenditures in the War Department (Chairman: William Williams; Ranking Member: Charles E. Phelps)
- Expenditures on Public Buildings (Chairman: Cadwallader C. Washburn; Ranking Member: Stevenson Archer)
- Freedmen's Affairs (Chairman: Thomas D. Eliot; Ranking Member: Daniel J. Morrell)
- Foreign Affairs (Chairman: Nathaniel P. Banks; Ranking Member: Austin Blair)
- Indian Affairs (Chairman: William Windom; Ranking Member: Glenni W. Scofield)
- Invalid Pensions (Chairman: Sidney Perham; Ranking Member: George F. Miller)
- Judiciary (Chairman: James F. Wilson; Ranking Member: William Lawrence)
- Manufactures (Chairman: Daniel J. Morrell; Ranking Member: William Moore)
- Mileage (Chairman: George W. Anderson; Ranking Member: Green B. Raum)
- Military Affairs (Chairman: James A. Garfield; Ranking Member: Green B. Raum)
- Militia (Chairman: Halbert E. Paine; Ranking Member: Austin Blair)
- Mines and Mining (Chairman: William Higby; Ranking Member: Morton C. Hunter)
- Naval Affairs (Chairman: Frederick A. Pike; Ranking Member: Thomas W. Ferry)
- Pacific Railroads (Chairman: Hiram Price; Ranking Member: Oakes Ames)
- Patents (Chairman: Thomas A. Jenckes; Ranking Member: Henry P.H. Bromwell)
- Post Office and Post Roads (Chairman: John F. Farnsworth; Ranking Member: John Lynch)
- Private Land Claims (Chairman: Godlove Stein Orth; Ranking Member: Alexander H. Bailey)
- Public Buildings and Grounds (Chairman: John Covode; Ranking Member: William Moore)
- Public Expenditures (Chairman: Calvin T. Hulburd; Ranking Member: John Coburn)
- Public Lands (Chairman: George W. Julian; Ranking Member: George W. Anderson)
- Revisal and Unfinished Business (Chairman: Luke P. Poland; Ranking Member: William Windom)
- Revolutionary Claims (Chairman: Hamilton Ward; Ranking Member: Daniel Polsley)
- Revolutionary Pensions and the War of 1812 (Chairman: Benjamin F. Loan; Ranking Member: Lewis Selye)
- Roads and Canals (Chairman: Burton C. Cook; Ranking Member: Grenville M. Dodge)
- Rules (Select) (Chairman: Schuyler Colfax; Ranking Member: James G. Blaine)
- Standards of Official Conduct
- Territories (Chairman: James M. Ashley; Ranking Member: James Mullins)
- Ways and Means (Chairman: Robert C. Schenck; Ranking Member: John A. Logan)
- Whole

=== Joint committees ===
- Conditions of Indian Tribes (Special)
- Enrolled Bills (Chairman: Rep. Stephen F. Wilson; Vice Chairman: Rep. William S. Holman)
- The Library (Chairman: John D. Baldwin; Vice Chairman: Rep. Rufus P. Spalding)
- Printing (Chairman: Rep. Addison H. Laflin; Vice Chairman: Rep. Henry L. Cake)
- Ordnance (Select) (Chairman: Rep. John A. Logan; Vice Chairman: Rep. Robert C. Schenck)
- Reorganize the Civil Service in the Departments
- Retrenchment (Chairman: Rep. Charles H. Van Wyck; Vice Chairman: Rep. Thomas A. Jenckes)
- Revise and Equalize the Pay of the Employees of Each House
- To Examine the Accounts for Repairs and Furnishing of the Executive Mansion (Chairman: Rep. Rufus P. Spalding; Vice Chairman: Rep. Adam J. Glossbrenner)

== Caucuses ==
- Democratic (House)
- Democratic (Senate)

== Employees ==
=== Legislative branch agency directors ===
- Architect of the Capitol: Edward Clark, appointed August 30, 1865
- Librarian of Congress: Ainsworth Rand Spofford

=== Senate ===
- Chaplain of the Senate: Edgar H. Gray (Baptist)
- Secretary of the Senate: John W. Forney, until June 4, 1868
  - George C. Gorham, elected June 4, 1868
- Sergeant at Arms of the Senate: George T. Brown

=== House of Representatives ===
- Chaplain of the House: Charles B. Boynton (Congregationalist)
- Clerk of the House: Edward McPherson
- Doorkeeper of the House: Charles E. Lippincott
- Messenger to the Speaker: William D. Todd
- Postmaster of the House: William S. King
- Reading Clerks: Edward W. Barber (D) and William K. Mehaffey (R)
- Sergeant at Arms of the House: Nehemiah G. Ordway

== See also ==
- 1866 United States elections (elections leading to this Congress)
  - 1866–67 United States Senate elections
  - 1866–67 United States House of Representatives elections
- 1868 United States elections (elections during this Congress, leading to the next Congress)
  - 1868 United States presidential election
  - 1868–69 United States Senate elections
  - 1868–69 United States House of Representatives elections
