= List of United States senators in the 40th Congress =

This is a complete list of United States senators during the 40th United States Congress listed by seniority from March 4, 1867, to March 3, 1869.

Order of service is based on the commencement of the senator's first term. Behind this is former service as a senator (only giving the senator seniority within their new incoming class), service as vice president, a House member, a cabinet secretary, or a governor of a state. The final factor is the population of the senator's state.

Senators who were sworn in during the middle of the Congress (up until the last senator who was not sworn in early after winning the November 1868 election) are listed at the end of the list with no number.

== Terms of service ==
Class	Terms of service of senators that expired in years
Class 1	Terms of service of senators that expired in 1869 (CA, CT, DE, FL, IN, MA, MD, ME, MI, MN, MO, MS, MT, NE, NJ, NV, NY, OH, PA, RI, TN, TX, VA, VT, WI, and WV.)
Class 2	Terms of service of senators that expired in 1871 (AL, AR, DE, GA, IA, IL, KS, KY, LA, MA, ME, MI, MN, MS, MT, NC, NE, NH, NJ, OR, RI, SC, TN, TX, VA, and WV.)
Class 3	Terms of service of senators that expired in 1873 (AL, AR, CA, CT, FL, GA, IA, IL, IN, KS, KY, LA, MD, MO, NC, NH, NV, NY, OH, OR, PA, SC, VT, and WI.)

== U.S. Senate seniority list ==
U.S. Senate seniority
Rank	Senator (party-state)	Seniority date	Other factors
1	Benjamin Wade (R-OH)	March 15, 1851	
2	Charles Sumner (LR-MA)	April 11, 1851	
3	Henry Wilson (R-MA)	January 31, 1855	
4	Lyman Trumbull (R-IL)	March 4, 1855	
5	Zachariah Chandler (R-MI)	March 4, 1857	
6	James Dixon (R-CT)	March 4, 1857	
7	James R. Doolittle (R-WI)	March 4, 1857	
8	Henry B. Anthony (R-RI)	March 4, 1859	Former governor
9	Willard Saulsbury, Sr. (D-DE)	March 4, 1859	
10	James W. Grimes (R-IA)	March 4, 1859	
11	Timothy O. Howe (R-WI)	March 4, 1861	
12	John Sherman (R-OH)	March 21, 1861	
13	Samuel C. Pomeroy (R-KS)	April 4, 1861	
14	Garrett Davis (D-KY)	December 23, 1861	
15	Jacob M. Howard (R-MI)	January 17, 1862	
16	Alexander Ramsey (R-MN)	March 4, 1863	
17	William Sprague IV (R-RI)	March 4, 1863	
18	John Conness (R-CA)	March 4, 1863	
19	Thomas A. Hendricks (D-IN)	March 4, 1863	
20	Reverdy Johnson (D-MD)	March 4, 1863	
21	Edwin D. Morgan (R-NY)	March 4, 1863	
22	Charles R. Buckalew (D-PA)	March 4, 1863	
23	Waitman T. Willey (R-VA)	August 4, 1863	
24	Peter G. Van Winkle (R-WV)	August 4, 1863	
25	George R. Riddle (D-DE)	February 2, 1864	
26	William M. Stewart (R-NV)	February 1, 1865	
27	James W. Nye (R-NV)	February 1, 1865	
28	Aaron H. Cragin (R-NH)	March 4, 1865	
29	Richard Yates (R-IL)	March 4, 1865	
30	William P. Fessenden (R-ME)	March 4, 1865	
31	Daniel S. Norton (R-MN)	March 4, 1865	
32	George H. Williams (R-OR)	March 4, 1865	
33	James Guthrie (D-KY)	March 4, 1865	
34	George F. Edmunds (R-VT)	April 3, 1866	
35	Edmund G. Ross (R-KS)	July 19, 1866	
36	Joseph S. Fowler (R-TN)	July 24, 1866	
37	David T. Patterson (R-TN)	July 28, 1866	
38	Alexander G. Cattell (R-NJ)	September 19, 1866	
39	Thomas Tipton (R-NE)	March 1, 1867	
40	John Milton Thayer (R-NE)	March 1, 1867	
41	Roscoe Conkling (R-NY)	March 4, 1867	
42	Justin Smith Morrill (R-VT)	March 4, 1867	
43	Oliver P. Morton (R-IN)	March 4, 1867	
44	Simon Cameron (R-PA)	March 4, 1867	
45	Orris S. Ferry (R-CT)	March 4, 1867	
46	Cornelius Cole (R-CA)	March 4, 1867	
47	James Harlan (R-IA)	March 4, 1867	
48	James W. Patterson (R-NH)	March 4, 1867	
49	Henry W. Corbett (R-OR)	March 4, 1867	
50	Charles D. Drake (R-MO)	March 4, 1867	
	James A. Bayard Jr. (D-DE)	April 5, 1867	
	Thomas C. McCreery (D-KY)	February 19, 1868	
	George Vickers (D-MD)	March 7, 1868	
	Adonijah Welch (R-FL)	June 17, 1868	
	Alexander McDonald (R-AR)	June 22, 1868	
	Benjamin F. Rice (R-AR)	June 23, 1868	
	Thomas W. Osborn (R-FL)	June 25, 1868	
	John S. Harris (R-LA)	July 8, 1868	
	William P. Kellogg (R-LA)	July 9, 1868	
	George E. Spencer (R-AL)	July 13, 1868	
	Willard Warner (R-AL)	July 13, 1868	
	John Pool (R-NC)	July 14, 1868	
	Joseph Carter Abbott (R-NC)	July 14, 1868	
	Thomas J. Robertson (R-SC)	July 15, 1868	
	Frederick A. Sawyer (R-SC)	July 16, 1868	

== See also ==
- 40th United States Congress
- List of United States representatives in the 40th Congress
