= Indian Bay, Arkansas =

- Census-designated place
- Location within Arkansas Location within the United States
- Coordinates: 34°23′09″N 91°04′01″W
- Country: United States
- State: Arkansas
- County: Monroe

Area
  - Total: 0.40 sq mi (1.0 km^{2})
  - Land: 0.38 sq mi (0.98 km^{2})
  - Water: 0.02 sq mi (0.052 km^{2})
- Elevation: 161 ft (49 m)

Population (2020)
  - Total: 15
- Time zone: UTC-6 (Central (CST))
  - Summer (DST): UTC-5 (CDT)
- ZIP Code: 72069 (Holly Grove)
- Area code: 870
- GNIS feature ID: 2805653
- FIPS code: 05-34220

Indian Bay is an unincorporated community and census-designated place (CDP) in southern Monroe County, Arkansas, United States, in the Arkansas Delta. Indian Bay is on the eastern bank of the White River, 4 miles (6 km) east of St. Charles. For purposes of the U.S. Census, Indian Bay is within Montgomery-Smalley Township. The Baytown Site, a Pre-Columbian Native American archaeological site, is located near Indian Bay. The community was first listed as a CDP in the 2020 census with a population of 15.

== History ==
The area of Indian Bay has long been inhabited, as is shown by nine Native American mounds nearby, the largest of which covers more than an acre. Artifacts found in the area are thought to be 1,300 to 1,700 years old, but the site is not open to the public.

Around 1825 white settlers came to the area. Cypress trees were harvested and cotton fields planted. By the mid 19th-century Indian Bay had several stores, a cotton gin and a sawmill, and had developed into a prominent stop for steamboats traveling on the White River. A post office opened at Indian Bay in 1860. Two area cotton plantations thrived. "Lamberton", a few miles north of Indian Bay in the no-longer existing community of Valley Grove, was started by Joel and Judith Lambert from Kentucky, who settled there in 1839. William Mayo arrived in the area around 1853, bringing a large number of slaves and developing a plantation of several thousand acres. The area gained notoriety when Congressman James M. Hinds was murdered there in 1868.

== Demographics ==
Historical population
Census	Pop.	Note	%±
2020	15		—
U.S. Decennial Census; 2020

=== 2020 census ===
Indian Bay CDP, Arkansas – Racial and ethnic composition Note: the US Census treats Hispanic/Latino as an ethnic category. This table excludes Latinos from the racial categories and assigns them to a separate category. Hispanics/Latinos may be of any race.
Race / Ethnicity (NH = Non-Hispanic)	Pop 2020	% 2020
White alone (NH)	12	80.00%
Black or African American alone (NH)	1	6.67%
Native American or Alaska Native alone (NH)	0	0.00%
Asian alone (NH)	0	0.00%
Pacific Islander alone (NH)	0	0.00%
Some Other Race alone (NH)	0	0.00%
Mixed Race or Multi-Racial (NH)	2	13.33%
Hispanic or Latino (any race)	0	0.00%
Total	15	100.00%
