= Dolores Chávez de Armijo =

State Librarian of New Mexico

- Doña Dolores Chávez de Armijo
- Born: Dolores Chávez; 1858; Albuquerque, New Mexico Territory, U.S.
- Died: 1929 (aged 70–71); Albuquerque, New Mexico, U.S.
- Burial place: Santa Fe National Cemetery, Santa Fe, New Mexico
- Occupation: Librarian
- Father: José Francisco Chaves

Doña Dolores Elizabeth "Lola" Chávez de Armijo (1858–1929) was the State Librarian of New Mexico from 1909 to 1917.

== Career ==
Chávez de Armijo, a prominent Republican in the region, was appointed to the position of State Librarian by Territorial Governor George Curry in 1909.

In 1912, William C. McDonald, the governor of New Mexico attempted to replace Chávez de Armijo with a Democrat, Mary Victory, a decision that was voted down by the Committee on Executive Communication. In response, McDonald brought a case to the Santa Fe District Court, claiming that women were unqualified to hold office under the constitution and laws of New Mexico. Chávez de Armijo then filed a lawsuit with the New Mexico Supreme Court (State v. De Armijo 1914-NMSC-021); the court ruled in her favor, allowing her to keep her position, and subsequent legislation gave women the right to hold appointed offices in New Mexico.

Chávez de Armijo continued to hold the role of State Librarian until her retirement in 1917.

== Personal life ==
Chávez de Armijo was born in Albuquerque in 1858 to José Francisco Chaves, a Republican political leader in the New Mexico Territory, and Mary Bowie, originally from California.

She married Mariano Armijo (d. 1904), with whom she had two children, Victoriana and George Washington. She died in Albuquerque in 1929 and was buried in the Santa Fe National Cemetery.

== Legacy ==
A marker in honor of Chávez de Armijo was erected on Tramway Road NE (New Mexico State Road 556) near Albuquerque.
