= Anthony A. C. Rogers =

American politician

Member of the U.S. House of Representatives from Arkansas's 2nd district
- In office March 4, 1869 – March 3, 1871
- Preceded by: James T. Elliott
- Succeeded by: Oliver P. Snyder

Personal details
- Born: Anthony Astley Cooper Rogers; February 14, 1821 Clarksville, Tennessee, U.S.
- Died: July 27, 1899 (aged 78) Los Angeles, California, U.S
- Resting place: Angelus-Rosedale Cemetery
- Party: Democratic

Anthony Astley Cooper Rogers (February 14, 1821 – July 27, 1899) was an American politician. He served one term in the House of Representative from Arkansas from 1869 to 1871.

== Biography ==
Born in Clarksville, Tennessee, Rogers received a limited schooling. He engaged in mercantile pursuits. He moved to Arkansas in 1854.

=== Early career ===
An opponent of Secession, he was a candidate of supporters of the Union as a delegate to the State convention in 1861. He was arrested for his loyalty, imprisoned, and forced to give bond to answer the charge of "treason against the Confederate Government."

Rogers was elected to the 38th United States Congress, but was not allowed to take his seat, his State not having been readmitted.

In 1864, he moved to Chicago, Illinois, and engaged in the real estate business. He returned to Arkansas in 1868.

=== Congress and later career ===
Rogers was elected as a Democrat to the 41st Congress, March 4, 1869, to March 3, 1871. He was an unsuccessful candidate for reelection in 1870 to the 42nd Congress.

He was postmaster at Pine Bluff, Arkansas, from January 7, 1881, to July 24, 1885, and again engaged in mercantile pursuits.

== Death and burial ==
In 1888, he moved to Los Angeles, where he died the following year at the age of 78. He is interred in Angelus-Rosedale Cemetery.

U.S. House of Representatives
Preceded by James T. Elliott	Member of the U.S. House of Representatives from Arkansas's 2nd congressional district March 4, 1869 – March 3, 1871	Succeeded by Oliver P. Snyder
