= Oliver P. Snyder =

American politician (1833–1882)

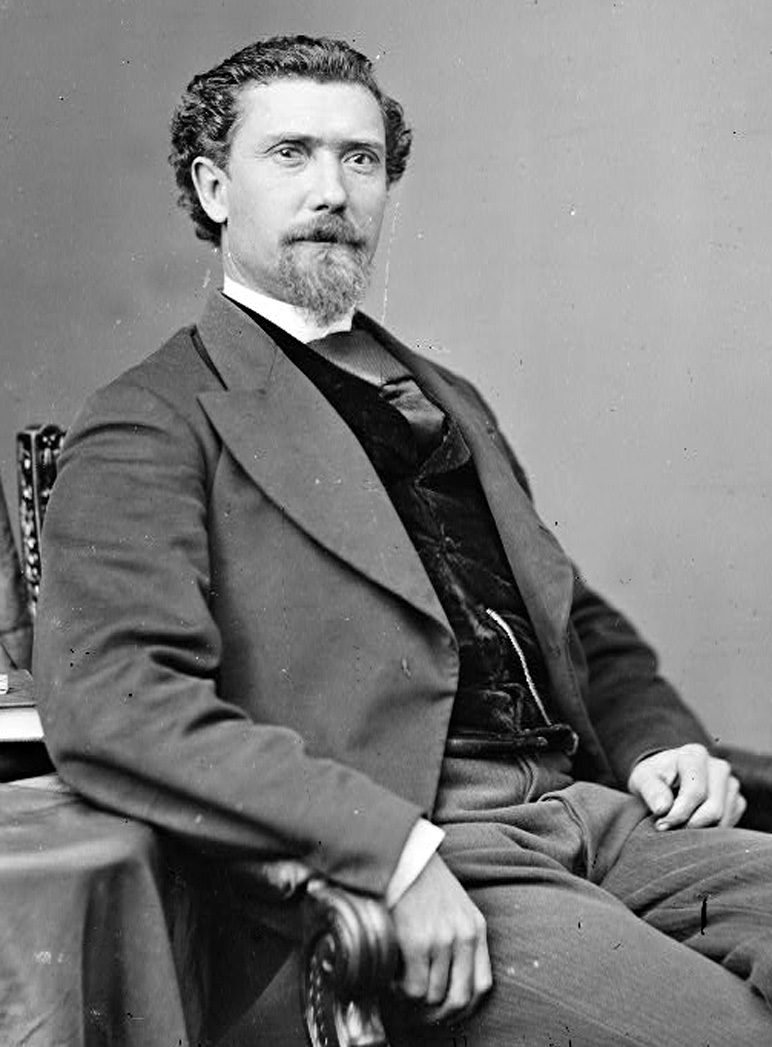

United States Representative from Arkansas
- In office March 4, 1871 – March 3, 1875
- Preceded by: Anthony A. C. Rogers
- Succeeded by: William F. Slemons

Arkansas State Senator for Jefferson County
- In office 1868–1871

Arkansas State Representative for Jefferson County
- In office 1864–1865

Personal details
- Born: November 13, 1833 Missouri, US
- Died: November 22, 1882 (aged 49) Pine Bluff, Arkansas, US
- Resting place: Bellewood Cemetery in Pine Bluff
- Party: Republican
- Occupation: Lawyer

Oliver P. Snyder (November 13, 1833 – November 22, 1882) was a U.S. representative who served from 1871 to 1875 during the Reconstruction of Arkansas.

Born in Missouri, Snyder completed preparatory studies and moved to Arkansas in 1853. He engaged in scientific and literary pursuits and simultaneously studied law. He was admitted to the bar and practiced in Pine Bluff in Jefferson County, Arkansas. From 1864 to 1865, he was a member of the Arkansas House of Representatives. In 1867, he was a delegate to the state constitutional convention. He served in the Arkansas State Senate from 1868 to 1871, in which capacity he was a member of the committee which in 1868 revised and rearranged the statutes of Arkansas.

Snyder was elected as a Republican to the Forty-second and Forty-third Congresses (March 4, 1871 – March 3, 1875). He was an unsuccessful candidate for renomination in 1874. He then resumed his law practice.

He was elected treasurer of Jefferson County in 1882 and served for a few months before his death that year, nine days after his 49th birthday. He is interred at Bellewood Cemetery in Pine Bluff.

U.S. House of Representatives
Preceded by Anthony A. C. Rogers	Member of the U.S. House of Representatives from Arkansas's 2nd congressional district March 4, 1871 – March 3, 1875	Succeeded by William F. Slemons
