= McDonald–Wait–Newton House =

Historic house in Arkansas, United States

- U.S. National Register of Historic Places
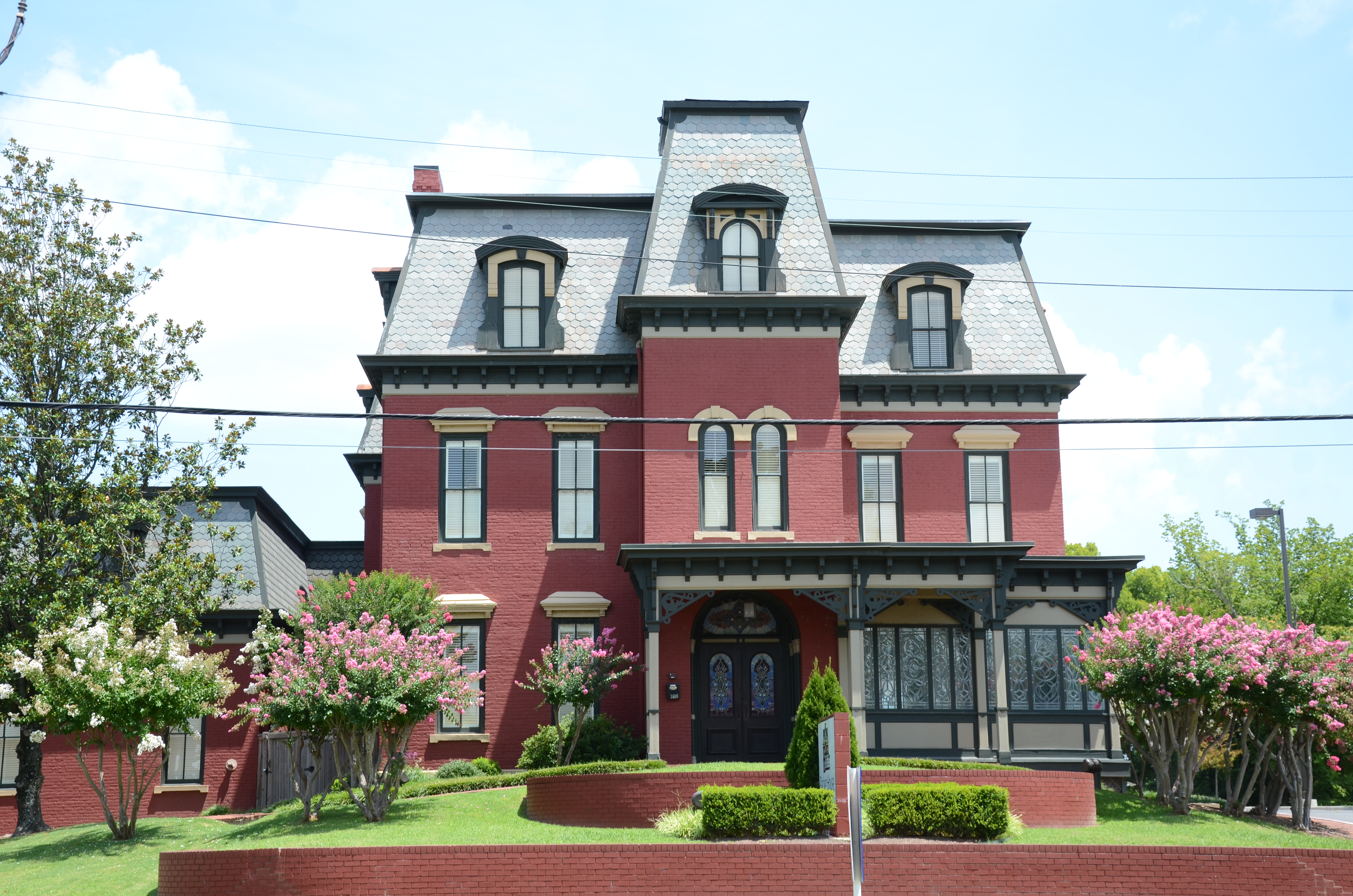

- Location within Arkansas Location within the United States
- Location: 1406 Cantrell Rd., Little Rock, Arkansas
- Coordinates: 34°45′12″N 92°17′6″W
- Area: less than one acre
- Built: 1869
- Built by: Alexander McDonald
- Architectural style: Second Empire
- NRHP reference No.: 78000622
- Added to NRHP: July 14, 1978

The McDonald–Wait–Newton House is a historic house at 1406 Cantrell Road in Little Rock, Arkansas. U.S. Senator Alexander McDonald lived in the house and Robert Francis Catterson stayed at the house during his time as a U.S. Marshall.

It is a 2 1/2-story brick building, with a mansard roof providing a full third story. The main facade is five bays wide, with a projecting central section topped by a mansarded tower. The roof is pierced by dormers with segmented-arch tops, and windows framed by decorative hoods. The main entrance is set in the base of the tower, with an elliptical stained glass light above. A porch shelters the entrance and wraps around to the right side, with a modillioned cornice and bracketed posts. Built in 1869, it is the last surviving post-Civil War mansion built along what became known as "Carpetbaggers' Row", as it is where a number of Northerners settled when moving to the city.

The house was listed on the National Register of Historic Places in 1978. The house today hosts the "1836 Club", a social club.

== See also ==
- National Register of Historic Places listings in Little Rock, Arkansas
