= Thomas G. Davidson =

American politician (1805–1883)

Thomas Green Davidson
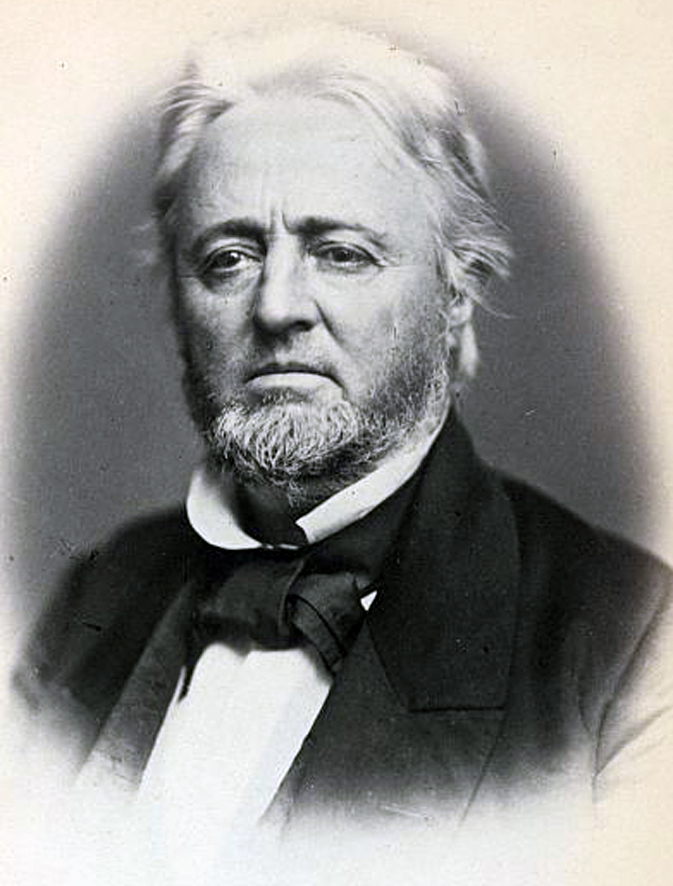
- Thomas G. Davidson

Member of the U.S. House of Representatives from Louisiana's 3rd district
- In office March 4, 1855 – March 3, 1861
- Preceded by: John Perkins Jr.
- Succeeded by: Joseph Parkinson Newsham

Personal details
- Born: August 3, 1805 Coles Creek, Mississippi, U.S.
- Died: September 11, 1883 (aged 78) Springfield, Louisiana, U.S.
- Party: Democratic
- Profession: Lawyer, Politician

Thomas Green Davidson (August 3, 1805 – September 11, 1883) was a Democratic U.S. Representative from Louisiana. Shortly after Louisiana seceded from the Union in January 1861, Davidson vacated his seat.

== Life and career ==
Born at Coles Creek, Mississippi, Davidson completed preparatory studies before going on to study law. He was admitted to the bar and commenced practice in Greensburg, Louisiana. After this he was appointed register of the United States land office. He served as member of the Louisiana House of Representatives from 1833–1846.

Davidson was elected as a Democrat to the 34th, 35th, and 36th Congresses (March 4, 1855 – March 3, 1861). After his time in congress he resumed the practice of his profession. He served as president of the Democratic State convention in Louisiana in 1855. He served again in the Louisiana House of Representatives 1874—1878, 1880, and 1883. He died in Springfield, Livingston Parish, Louisiana, September 11, 1883. He was interred in Springfield Cemetery.

U.S. House of Representatives
Preceded by John Perkins Jr.	Member of the U.S. House of Representatives from Louisiana's 3rd congressional district 1855–1861	Succeeded by Joseph Parkinson Newsham
