= Michel Vidal =

American politician

Member of the U.S. House of Representatives from Louisiana's 4th district
- In office July 18, 1868 – March 3, 1869
- Preceded by: Vacant due to Civil War
- Succeeded by: Joseph P. Newsham

United States Consul to Tripoli
- In office April 5, 1870 – October 12, 1876

Personal details
- Born: October 1, 1824 Carcassonne, Languedoc, France
- Died: October 20, 1895 (aged 71) Montreal, Canada
- Party: Republican
- Education: University (France)
- Profession: Diplomat, newspaper editor, politician

Michel Vidal (October 1, 1824 - October 20, 1895) was a U.S. representative from Louisiana.

Born in the city of Carcassonne, Languedoc, France, Vidal completed university-level studies in France before emigrating to the Republic of Texas. Soon after Texas became annexed to the United States, Vidal moved to the French-speaking region of south Louisiana. He engaged in literary and scientific pursuits and served as associate editor of several American and French newspapers for the French-speaking populations of the U.S. and Canada. He also served as an editor of the New York Courrier des États-Unis and the New Orleans Picayune (now the Times-Picayune). At the close of the Civil War he was appointed by General Philip Sheridan a registrar for the city of New Orleans. In 1867, he moved to Opelousas, Louisiana, where he founded and edited the Saint Landry Progress. He served as delegate to the State constitutional convention of 1867 and 1868 (this convention wrote the "Reconstruction Constitution" which was in turn rescinded after white Democrats again gained control of Louisiana government) after 1876.

Upon readmission of Louisiana to representation in Congress, Vidal was elected, from Louisiana's 4th congressional district (which included Opelousas), as a Republican to the Fortieth United States Congress, (July 18, 1868 – March 3, 1869), and was effectively in office until 1870. He was appointed a United States commissioner under the convention concluded with Peru in 1868 for the adjustment of claims of citizens of either country. On his leaving Congress, Vidal was appointed by President Ulysses Grant as United States consul at Tripoli, Libya, where he served from April 5, 1870, to October 12, 1876. He died in Montreal.

U.S. House of Representatives
Vacant Civil War and Reconstruction Title last held by John M. Landrum	United States Representative for the 4th Congressional District of Louisiana; 1868–1869	Vacant Title next held by Joseph P. Newsham
Diplomatic posts
Unknown	United States Consul to Tripoli (part of the Ottoman Empire); 1870–1876	Unknown
