= Louisiana Bar Exam =

The Louisiana Bar Exam is a three-day-long bar examination used to determine whether a candidate is qualified to practice law in the state of Louisiana. It is the longest bar exam in the United States, consisting of 21 hours of examination on nine topic areas. To sit for the exam, an applicant must graduate from an ABA-accredited law school and be deemed of good moral character.

== Exam admission ==
The Louisiana Bar requires that all exam takers fulfill all the ethical and legal requirements that are needed to be admitted to the bar. In response, a bar admission program was created to help ensure that all applicants meet the requirements contained in Rule XVII of the Louisiana Supreme Court Rules.

== Exam sittings ==
Testing is done on the Monday, Wednesday, and Friday of the designated exam week, with nothing on Tuesday and Thursday; it is the only bar examination in the United States not administered on consecutive days. The exam consists of 21 total hours of testing (7 hours each on Monday and Wednesday and Friday). The exam is offered twice a year, in February and July; in New Orleans.

== Exam topics ==
Topic areas tested on Monday include Code I, II, and III (general Louisiana Civil Code topics). Wednesday's session covers Louisiana Code of Civil Procedure, Torts, and Business Entities. Friday's session covers Constitutional Law; Criminal Law, Criminal Procedure, and Evidence; and Federal Jurisdiction and Procedure. The first five sections are referred to informally as "Code Sections" (since they test law that is supposed to be specific to the Louisiana Civil Code), and the last four are referred to as "non-Code Sections." This distinction is important for determining if someone has passed the bar exam (see below on passing.) The exam is almost entirely subjective essay questions, with some objective true/false or short-answer questions occasionally thrown in, depending on the specific examiner for that subject area; however, the exam is either entirely hand written or typed on a computer. Louisiana does not use the Multistate Bar Examination or any sort of performance test.

== Grading and results ==
Each of the nine sections has one examiner, who writes both the exam question and model answer, and a certain number of graders who grade the actual answers to the exams. Graders are usually practicing attorneys who are awarded CLE credit for their time. Each individual exam subject is scored on a scale of 0 to 100, with "Code" sections (sections 1–5, respectively) weighted twice as much as the "non-Code" sections. The examiner's decision is final.

Beginning with the July 2012 administration, examinees will no longer be able to "condition" the exam. Rather, examinees must have a total score of at least 650 out of 900, higher than the previous score of 630 needed, after conversion from raw scores on each of the nine sections of the exam (whereby the "code sections" are weighted more heavily than the "non-code" sections.) The Louisiana Supreme Court has recently placed a limitation on the number of times an applicant may sit for the Louisiana Bar examination. Applicants shall have only five (5) attempts to pass the examination. Results of each examination are mailed to each applicant as well as posted on the front doors of the Louisiana State Supreme Court building and on the Supreme Court's website. Passing applicants are listed by full name, with conditional or failed applicants listed by an examination ID number issued by the LASCBA. Applicants who failed the exam have the opportunity to review the sections they failed and compare them to other "model" passing answers from that administration. After the opportunity to review failed exams is over, all answers are destroyed. Applicants can only appeal mathematical errors in adding up the points for each exam, so no substantive appeals are available.

The July 2014 Bar Exam pass rate was 69.82%. Out of a total of 762 applicants, 532 passed and 230 failed.

== Effects of Hurricane Katrina ==
Hurricane Katrina affected a small number of the July 2005 applicants whose answers were destroyed when graders' offices and homes were flooded. Most applicants were not directly affected, as they had already met the minimum requirements for passing without relying on the answers that were destroyed. For the 13 students whose passing was dependent on the destroyed exam answers (Code I), the Louisiana Supreme Court allowed them to retake the missing section of the exam; however, the re-test consisted of different questions than the original exam. They all eventually passed.

== See also ==
- Bar examination
