= Charles P. Clever =

American politician

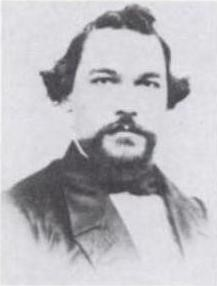

Delegate to the United States House of Representatives from New Mexico Territory
- In office September 2, 1867 – February 20, 1869
- Preceded by: José Francisco Chaves
- Succeeded by: José Francisco Chaves

Personal details
- Born: February 23, 1830 Cologne, Kingdom of Prussia
- Died: July 8, 1874 (aged 44) Tome, New Mexico Territory
- Education: University of Bonn

Charles P. Clever (February 23, 1830 – July 8, 1874) was a delegate from the Territory of New Mexico.

He was born in Cologne, Prussia where he attended the gymnasium of Cologne and later the University of Bonn. He immigrated to the United States in 1848 and settled in Santa Fe, New Mexico, in 1850. He engaged in trade from 1855 to 1862, and was appointed United States marshal for New Mexico in 1857. He became one of the owners of the Santa Fe Weekly Gazette in 1858. He studied law, was admitted to the bar in 1861 and commenced practice in Santa Fe. He was again appointed United States marshal in 1861.

He served as adjutant on the staff of General Edward Canby at the Battle of Valverde, and as adjutant general of New Mexico from 1861 to 1865 and then again in 1867 and 1868. He served as Territorial Attorney general in from 1862 to 1867. Clever presented credentials as Delegate-elect to the Fortieth Congress and served from September 2, 1867, to February 20, 1869, when he was succeeded by José Francisco Chaves, who contested the election.

Clever was appointed one of the incorporators of the Centennial Exposition. He also served as a commissioner to revise and codify the laws of New Mexico.

He engaged in the practice of law until his death in Tome, New Mexico, on July 8, 1874, and was interred in the Santa Fe National Cemetery.

== Sources ==
- United States Congress. "Charles P. Clever (id: C000517)". Biographical Directory of the United States Congress.

U.S. House of Representatives
Preceded by Vacant	Delegate to the U.S. House of Representatives from New Mexico; September 2, 1867 - February 20, 1869	Succeeded by J. Francisco Chaves
