= Joseph P. Newsham =

American journalist (1837–1919)

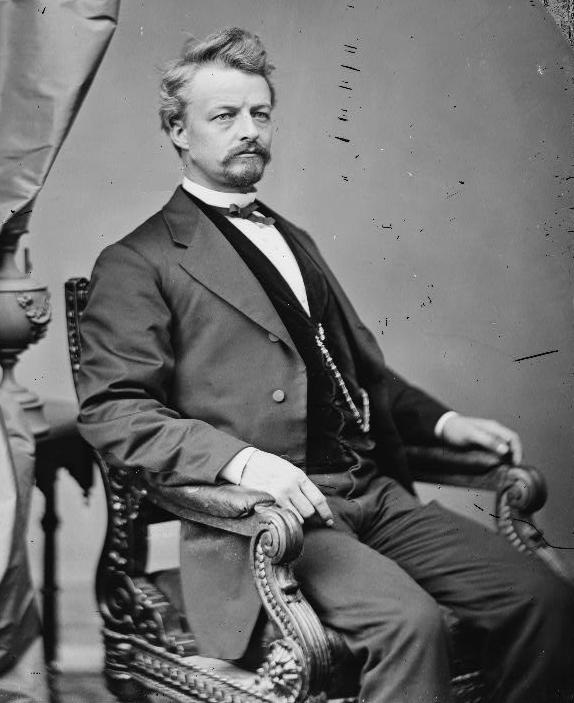

Member of the U.S. House of Representatives from Louisiana
- In office July 18, 1868 – March 3, 1869
- Preceded by: Thomas G. Davidson
- Succeeded by: Chester B. Darrall
- Constituency: 3rd district
- In office May 23, 1870 – March 3, 1871
- Preceded by: Michel Vidal
- Succeeded by: James McCleery
- Constituency: 4th district

Personal details
- Born: Joseph Parkinson Newsham; May 24, 1837 Preston, Lancashire, UK
- Died: October 22, 1919 (aged 82) St. Francisville, Louisiana, US
- Resting place: Grace Church Cemetery in St. Francisville
- Party: Republican
- Profession: Politician, Lawyer, Merchant, planter

Joseph Parkinson Newsham (May 24, 1837 – October 22, 1919) was a 19th-century politician, lawyer, merchant and planter from Louisiana, who served two non-consecutive terms in the U.S. House of Representatives.

== Biography ==
Born in Preston, England, Newsham immigrated to the United States with his parents in 1839, settling in Monroe County, Illinois. He received an academic education, was employed in a mercantile establishment for two years, studied law, and was admitted to the bar in 1860, commencing practice in Edwardsville, Illinois.

=== Civil War ===
During the Civil War, he served as adjutant of the 32nd Missouri Volunteer Infantry in the Union Army, resigning in 1864 on account of disabling injuries received in action on July 4 of that year.

=== Move to Louisiana ===
Newsham moved to Donaldsonville, Louisiana, in 1864 where he was clerk of the fourth judicial district court of the Parish of Ascension and was admitted to the Louisiana bar in 1865, commencing practice in Donaldsonville. He moved to St. Francisville, Louisiana, in 1867 and was a member of the Louisiana Constitutional Convention in 1867 and 1868.

=== Congress ===
Upon Louisiana's being admitted back into the Union, Newsham was elected a Republican to the U.S. House of Representatives in 1868 from Louisiana's 3rd congressional district and served until 1869. He established the Feliciana Republican in 1868 and was elected to the House of Representatives in 1870, this time from Louisiana's 4th congressional district, and served for that district until 1871. He was not a candidate for renomination in 1870 and thus left office when the term ended in 1871.

Afterward, he worked as a planter and merchant in St. Francisville, Louisiana until his retirement in 1913.

=== Death and burial ===
Newsham died in St. Francisville on October 22, 1919, and was interred in Grace Church Cemetery in St. Francisville.

== Notes ==
U.S. House of Representatives
| Preceded by Thomas G. Davidson^{(1)} | Member of the U.S. House of Representatives from Louisiana's 3rd congressional district July 18, 1868 – March 3, 1869 | Succeeded by Chester B. Darrall |
| Preceded by Michel Vidal | Member of the U.S. House of Representatives from Louisiana's 4th congressional district May 23, 1870 – March 3, 1871 | Succeeded by James McCleery |
Notes and references
1. Because of Louisiana's secession, the House seat was vacant for over seven years before Newsham succeeded Davidson.
