= James T. Elliott =

American politician (1823–1875)

James Thomas Elliott
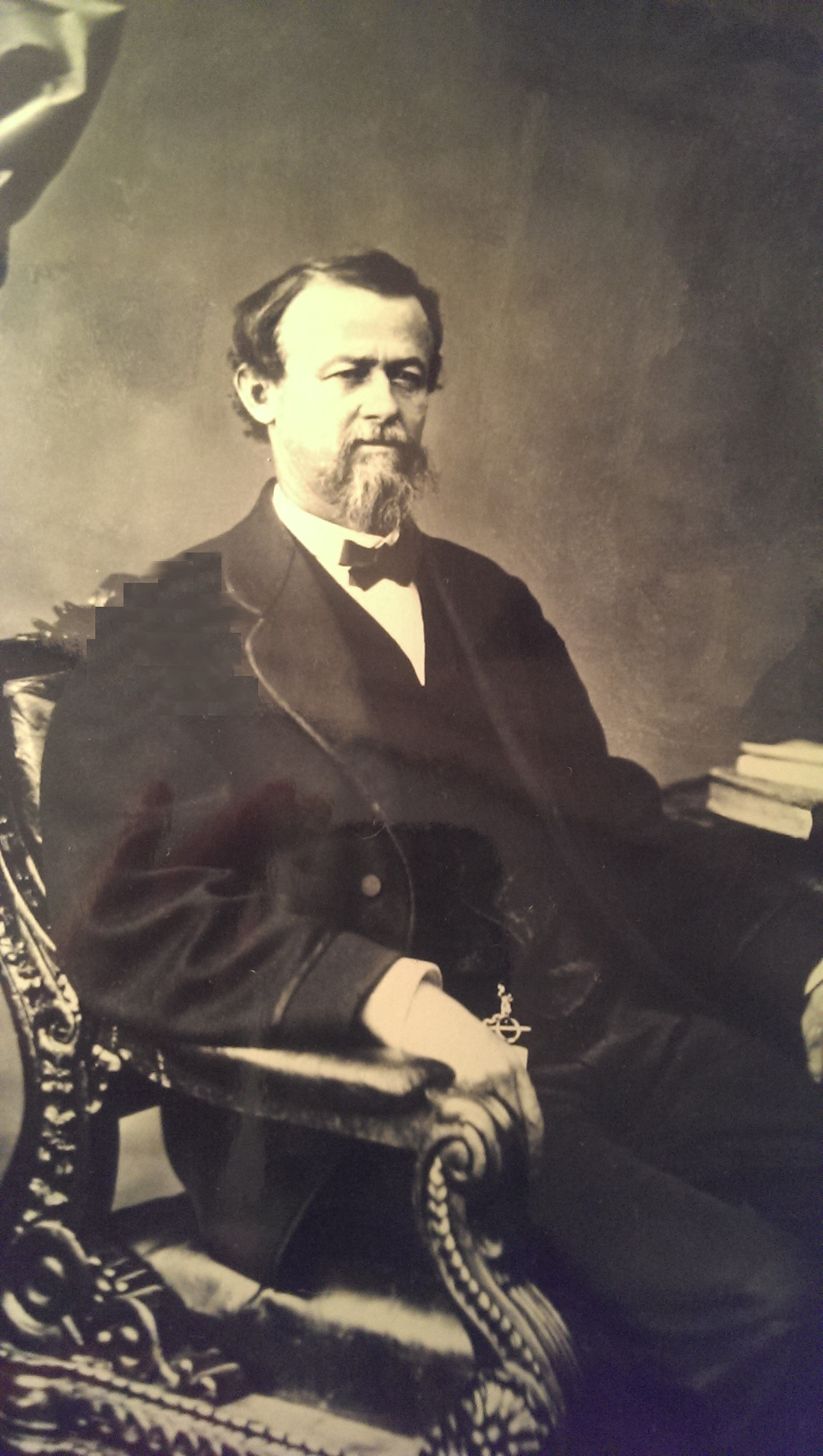
- James Elliott, United States Representative from Arkansas' 2nd congressional district

Member of the U.S. House of Representatives from Arkansas's 2nd district
- In office January 13, 1869 – March 3, 1869
- Preceded by: James M. Hinds
- Succeeded by: Anthony A. C. Rogers

Judge of the Arkansas 9th Judicial District Court
- In office 1872–1874

Personal details
- Born: April 22, 1823 Columbus, Georgia, USA
- Died: July 28, 1875 (aged 52) Camden, Ouachita County; Arkansas
- Resting place: Oakland Cemetery in Camden, Arkansas
- Party: Republican
- Spouse: Augusta Brooks Elliott
- Children: Four children
- Occupation: Attorney

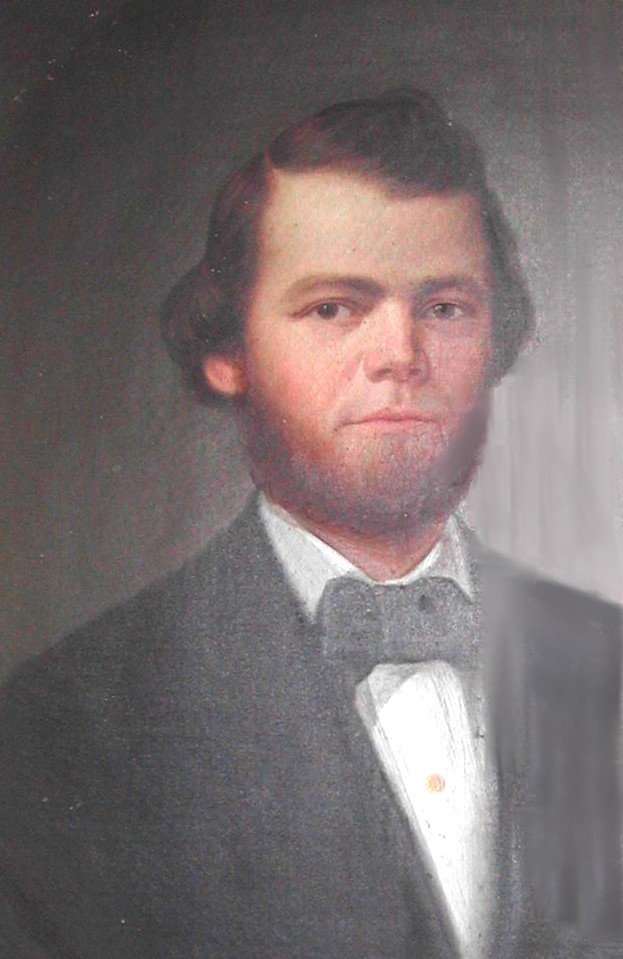
U.S. Representative James Thomas Elliott's son, William Sells Elliott; William ran the Elliott Grocery Store on family land located outside of Camden, Arkansas. The Elliott family lost three of their four children.

James Thomas Elliott (April 22, 1823 – July 28, 1875) was a United States representative for the state of Arkansas. He held the position for forty-nine days in 1869.

== Background ==
Born in 1823, a native of Columbus, Georgia, Elliott attended the public schools and studied law. In 1854, he was admitted to the bar and commenced his practice in Camden in Ouachita County, Arkansas. In 1858, he became the president of the Mississippi, Ouachita & Red River Railroad.

On April 4, 1844, he married the former Gugielma Sells, and the couple had four children.

== The Elliott House ==
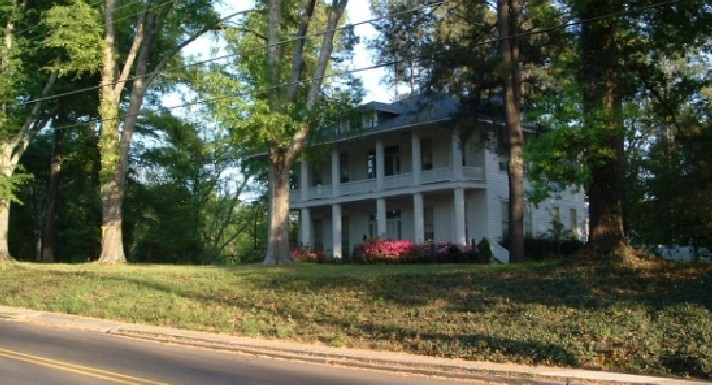
The Elliott House was built in Camden by U.S. Representative James Thomas Elliott. During the American Civil War, the house was requisitioned by Union General Frederick Salomon and housed, simultaneously, Elliott's own Confederate family and the war photographer Mathew Brady.

In 1857, Elliott constructed his Elliott House on West Washington Street in Camden. The Union Army General Frederick Salomon occupied the structure in 1864 during his stay in Camden. The family lived upstairs during the occupation. Their son, Milton Arteles Elliott, was a 13-year-old private in the Confederate States of America Army. Mathew Brady photographed their younger son, William Sells Elliott, on the front porch of the house.

Later, the Elliott House was an archaeological study of the relics of the time that the house was used as a Union hospital. This was during the time prior to the Battle of Poison Springs. Numerous shell casings were found as well as old pottery from hospital usage. The battle was the last significant fight won by the Confederacy. It occurred on April 18, 1864, during the Arkansas phase of the Red River Campaign.

== Later life and politics ==
Elliott was briefly a circuit judge of the Sixth Judicial District of Arkansas from October 2, 1865, to September 15, 1866. He established and edited the South Arkansas Journal in 1867. In this time period, the family lost two daughters, Belle and Emmaline Elliott to yellow fever on the same day.

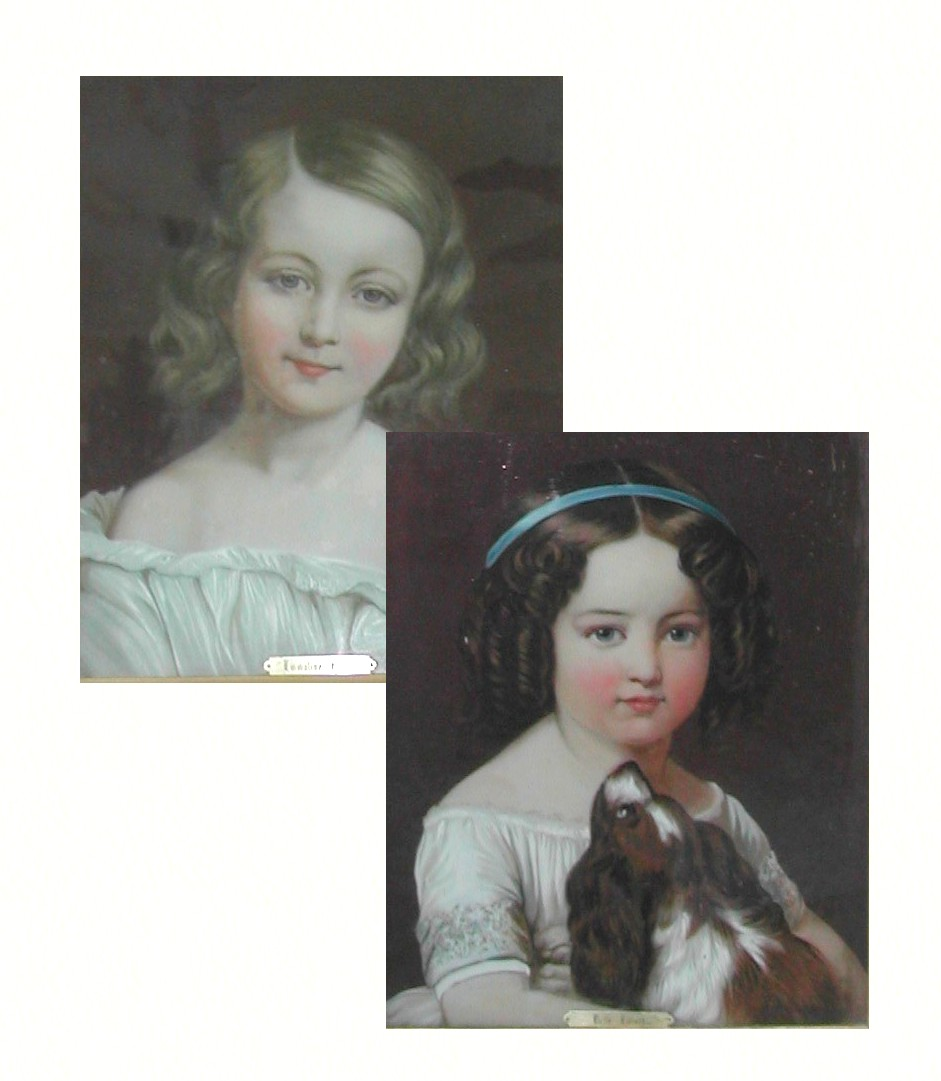
Daughters of Augusta and James Thomas Elliott, Belle and Emmaline, died the same day of yellow fever

== Reconstruction, KKK murder, call to Congress ==
During Reconstruction, the U.S. Representative James M. Hinds was assassinated on October 22, 1868, by George A. Clark, a member of the Ku Klux Klan and the secretary of the Democratic Committee of Monroe County, Arkansas.

Elliott was elected as a Republican to the Fortieth Congress to fill the vacancy. He served only from January 13 to March 3, 1869. He died in Arkansas at age 52

== Career summary ==
United States Representative James Thomas Elliott

- Admitted to the bar in 1854
- President of the Mississippi, Ouachita & Red River Railroad in 1858.
- Housed Union General Frederick Salomon and Mathew Brady during the Battle of Poison Springs, in 1864.
- Circuit Judge of the Sixth Judicial District of Arkansas from October 2, 1865, serving until September 15, 1866.
- Republican Party, United States Representative, from Arkansas to the 40th United States Congress, served from January 13, 1869, to March 4, 1869.
- Elected to the Arkansas State Senate in 1870.
- Judge of the Ninth Judicial District 1872–1874, when the State Constitution was adopted.
- Died in Camden, Arkansas, on July 28, 1875; interred with his family at Oakland Cemetery there.

== Historical references ==
His daughter-in-law, Sattie Buskin Elliott, the wife of Milton Elliott, edited, and with the assistance of the ladies in the Arkansas Historical Society of Ouachita County published a book, Garden of Memories, held in the Library of Congress.

U.S. House of Representatives
| Preceded by James M. Hinds | Member of the U.S. House of Representatives from Arkansas's 2nd congressional district January 13, 1869 – March 3, 1869 | Succeeded by Anthony A. C. Rogers |
