= Alexander McDonald (American politician) =

American politician

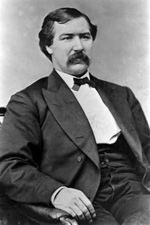

United States Senator from Arkansas
- In office June 22, 1868 – March 3, 1871
- Preceded by: William K. Sebastian
- Succeeded by: Powell Clayton

Personal details
- Born: April 10, 1832 Lock Haven, Clinton County; Pennsylvania, USA
- Died: December 13, 1903 (aged 71) Norwood; St. Lawrence County; New York
- Party: Republican

Alexander McDonald (April 10, 1832 – December 13, 1903) was a Republican politician who represented Arkansas in the United States Senate during the Reconstruction years from 1868 to 1871.

== Biography ==
McDonald was born near Lock Haven in Clinton County in north central Pennsylvania and attended Dickinson Seminary in Williamsport, and Lewisburg University, both in Pennsylvania. In 1857, he moved to Kansas, became involved in business, and served in the Union Army during the American Civil War. Upon completion of his service in 1863, McDonald moved to the capital city of Little Rock to work in banking. He served as a member of the state's constitutional convention; upon readmission to the Union he was elected by the Arkansas General Assembly to the Senate in 1868, with service for three years. He was defeated for reelection in 1870. McDonald was later commissioned by U.S. President Chester A. Arthur to examine the conditions of portions of the Northern Pacific Railroad, a task he completed in 1885. Later in his career, he became interested in the development of railroads. He moved to New York City in 1900. McDonald died in Norwood, a village in St. Lawrence County in northern New York State; his body was returned to Lock Haven for burial.

McDonald's Little Rock home, the McDonald–Wait–Newton House, still stands and is listed on the National Register of Historic Places.

== Notes ==
U.S. Senate
Preceded by William K. Sebastian (preceding American Civil War)	U.S. senator (Class 2) from Arkansas; 1868–1871; Served alongside: Benjamin F. Rice	Succeeded by Powell Clayton
