= James M. Hinds =

American politician (1833–1868)

James Hinds
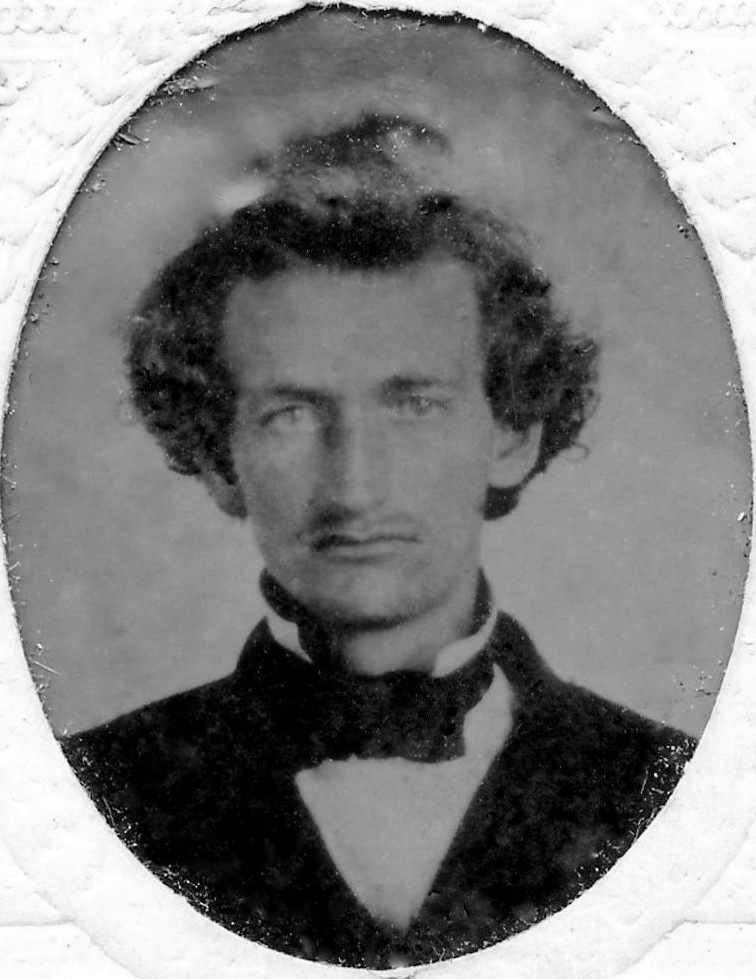

Member of the U.S. House of Representatives from Arkansas's 2nd district
- In office June 22, 1868 – October 22, 1868
- Preceded by: Albert Rust (1861)
- Succeeded by: James T. Elliott

Personal details
- Born: December 5, 1833 Hebron, New York, U.S.
- Died: October 22, 1868 (aged 34) near Indian Bay, Arkansas, U.S.
- Party: Democratic (Before 1865); Republican (1865–1868)
- Spouse: Anna Pratt
- Children: 3
- Education: University at Albany; University of Cincinnati (LLB)

James M. Hinds (December 5, 1833 – October 22, 1868) was the first U.S. congressman assassinated in office. He served as a member of the United States House of Representatives for Arkansas from June 24, 1868, until his assassination by the Ku Klux Klan. Hinds, who was white, was a Republican and an advocate of civil rights for black former slaves during the Reconstruction era following the American Civil War.

Born and raised in a small town in upstate New York, Hinds went west at the age of nineteen and graduated in 1856 from the Cincinnati Law School in Cincinnati, Ohio. He settled in Minnesota, where he opened a private law practice and was elected district attorney of his county. Looking for a fresh start, Hinds moved to the capital city of Little Rock, Arkansas in 1865. In 1867, he was elected to represent Pulaski County as a Republican at the Arkansas Constitutional Convention. The convention was tasked with rewriting the constitution to allow Arkansas' readmission to the Union following its secession and the American Civil War. At that convention, Hinds successfully advocated for constitutional provisions establishing the right to vote for adult freedmen, and for public education for both black and white children.

Campaigning for Republican candidate Ulysses S. Grant in the 1868 presidential election, Hinds was threatened and targeted by the Ku Klux Klan. In October 1868, while travelling to a political meeting with Joseph Brooks in Monroe County, Hinds was shot to death by Klansman and Secretary of the local Democratic Party, George Clark. Hinds was the first of two sitting members of the U.S. House of Representatives to be targeted in successful assassinations while in office, followed by Leo Ryan in 1978, who was killed in the Jonestown Massacre in the South American nation of Guyana. (Note: Other members of the House of Representatives have been killed while in office, although not as assassination attempts; others since Ryan's death have been the target of deliberate assassination attempts, albeit without success to date. See List of members of the United States Congress killed or wounded in office for details.)

== Early life ==
Hinds was born in East Hebron, New York, to Charles and Jane Hinds. The youngest of six children, his brother Henry also became an attorney. Hinds' other siblings were brothers William, John, and Calvin, and his sister, Jane. He attended high school at Washington Academy in Salem, New York, and college at the Albany Normal School (now University at Albany, SUNY). Hinds read law at a school in St. Louis, Missouri, before graduating from Cincinnati Law School four years after his brother Henry did so.

== Career ==
=== Minnesota ===
Hinds initially left home and went west at age 19. After obtaining a law degree, in 1856 (at age 23) he moved to the Minnesota Territory and settled in St. Peter, the county seat of Nicollet County 40 miles (64 km) west of his brother Henry in Shakopee, Minnesota. Hinds opened a law practice and was elected district attorney for the county.

Hinds was building a career and starting a family in St. Peter during a turbulent time in the region because of conflict between settlers and homesteaders and the Dakota Sioux, culminating in the Dakota War of 1862. He enlisted as a private in the First Minnesota Cavalry's Mounted Rangers, Company E during the conflict. Hinds hoped that St. Peter would become the capital of the new State of Minnesota. By early 1865, however, he realized that the town was destined to remain a small farming village. Seeking a fresh start and more opportunity, in mid-1865 he relocated with his wife and two young daughters to Little Rock, Arkansas, in the throes of Reconstruction.

=== Arkansas ===
Hinds found Arkansas, one of the 11 states of the former Confederacy, heavily degraded by the Civil War. The economy and labor system, which had relied upon slavery, were in shambles, and fighting between Confederate and Union forces had led to population decline and the loss of millions of dollars of property.

As with many Northerners, Hinds did not understand the depth of the South's resentment toward African Americans and Northerners. He believed that in the wake of the 1863 Emancipation Proclamation, the Civil War, and the Fourteenth Amendment to the United States Constitution, freedmen in the South should enjoy the same liberties as in the North, and underestimated continuing fierce resistance from whites who had sided with the Confederacy. These sentiments were later eulogized by Logan H. Roots, a contemporary who represented Arkansas in Congress. Hinds found himself referred to as a carpetbagger, a pejorative term used by resentful Southerners to disparage Northerners who moved south during Reconstruction.

In mid-1865 in Little Rock, Hinds formed a law practice with Elisha Baxter, one of the state's leading Unionists. Baxter, who fought with the Union Army during the war, would be selected to serve on to the Arkansas Supreme Court by the newly established government and was later governor of Arkansas. In October 1867, Hinds was elected a delegate at Arkansas's 1868 Constitution Convention. At that Convention he was made chairman of the Committee on the Elective Franchise. The new constitution that emerged that February, ratified in March, provided voting rights for black males over the age of 21 and for the creation of public schools for both black and white children. Elected to Congress for the 2nd congressional district early that year as a Republican, Hinds went to Washington D.C. in April 1868, where he arranged for Arkansas to be the first state to rejoin the union under the 1867 Reconstruction Acts. In May 1868, Hinds was a delegate at the 1868 Republican National Convention held in Chicago. Returning to Arkansas in August, he campaigned vigorously for Republican presidential candidate Ulysses S. Grant and for civil rights for former slaves.

== Assassination ==
Hinds was the first U.S. Congressman assassinated in office. He was murdered on the eve of the 1868 presidential election, which was a contest over civil rights and suffrage for freed slaves. Republicans, led by former Union Army General Ulysses S. Grant, favored those measures, while the Democratic Party opposed them. On October 22, 1868, en route to a campaign event for Grant near the village of Indian Bay in Monroe County, a man shot Hinds and fellow Republican politician Joseph Brooks in the back with a shotgun. Brooks managed to stay on his horse and ride to the event to bring back assistance. Hinds was knocked off his horse by the shotgun blast to his back, and lay on the road until help arrived. Before he died, Hinds wrote a short message to his wife and identified his killer. He died about two hours after the attack. A Coroner's Inquest identified the shooter as George Clark, secretary of the Monroe County Democratic Party and a local Klansman. Clark was never arrested or prosecuted.

A week after the attack, The Morning Republican newspaper published the story, recounting that "Men passing and returning soon found Mr. Hinds lying in the road still alive and rational, but conscious of the fact that his wound was of such serious nature that but a few moments more remained of his earthly career."

Arkansas Governor Powell Clayton feared that the murder of Hinds, coming amid rising violence against Republicans and former slaves, was a precursor to a general attack on state officers to seize control of the government and the polls prior to the election, and initiated military action against the Ku Klux Klan. The insurrection did not take place. Hinds is interred near his birthplace, at Evergreen Cemetery in Salem, New York. The Congressional Cemetery in Washington, D.C. contains a memorial stone in his honor.

== See also ==
- List of assassinated American politicians
- List of members of the United States Congress killed or wounded in office
- List of members of the United States Congress who died in office (1790–1899)

== Notes ==
U.S. House of Representatives
| Vacant Title last held by Albert Rust; 1861 | Member of the U.S. House of Representatives from Arkansas's 2nd congressional district 1868 | Succeeded by James T. Elliott |
