= José Francisco Chaves =

American military officer and politician (1833–1904)

José Chaves
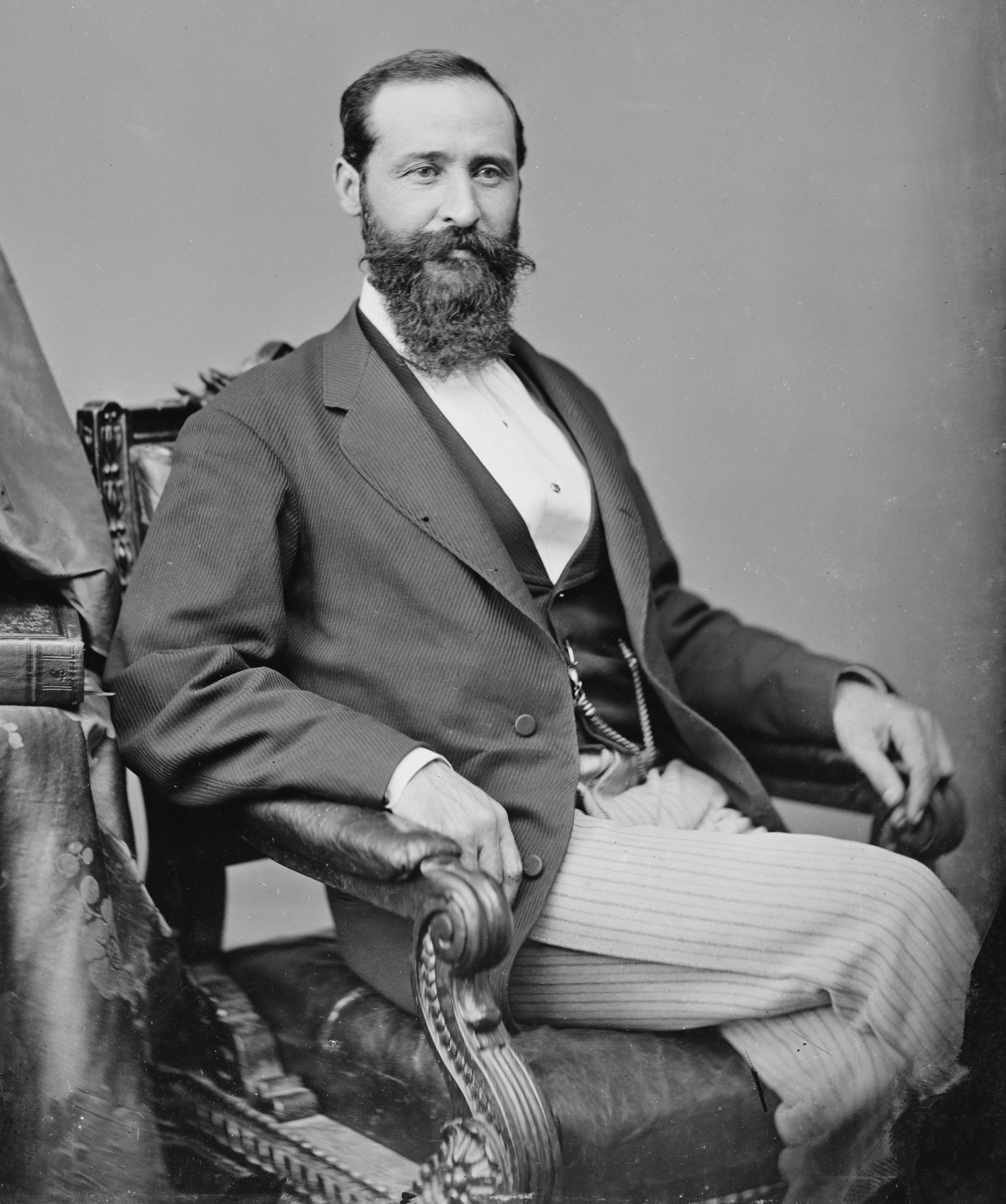

Delegate to the U.S. House of Representatives from the New Mexico Territory's at-large district
- In office February 20, 1869 – March 3, 1871
- Preceded by: Charles P. Clever
- Succeeded by: José Gallegos
- In office March 4, 1865 – March 3, 1867
- Preceded by: Francisco Perea
- Succeeded by: Charles P. Clever

Personal details
- Born: José Francisco Chaves Perea; June 27, 1833 Padillas, New Mexico, Mexico (now Bernalillo County, New Mexico, United States)
- Died: November 26, 1904 (aged 71) Pinos Wells, New Mexico Territory, U.S. (now near Cedarvale, New Mexico)
- Party: Republican
- Children: Dolores
- Relatives: Mariano Chaves (father)
- Education: Columbia University

José Francisco Chaves Perea (June 27, 1833 – November 26, 1904) was a nineteenth-century military leader, politician, lawyer and rancher from the New Mexico Territory.

== Biography ==
=== Family ===
José Francisco Chaves was born on June 27, 1833, in Los Padillas, New Mexico (then in the Departmento de Nuevo México of the United Mexican States) in what is now Bernalillo County, near Albuquerque, New Mexico. His father was Don Mariano Chaves and his mother Dolores Perea was the daughter of Don Pedro Jose Perea of Bernalillo. She later married Dr. Henry Connelly, who became Territorial New Mexico governor during the Civil War. José's father, Don Mariano Chaves, was chief of staff under Governor Manuel Armijo in the revolution of 1837 and inspector general of all the military forces of New Mexico. Don Mariano later served as pro-tem governor under Mexican rule in the absence of governor Armijo. José Francisco was a paternal grandson of Don Francisco Xavier Chávez, the first Governor (1822–1823) of the Departmento de Nuevo México under the independent First Mexican Empire shortly after Mexican War of Independence from Spain ended in 1821. José was also a first cousin of Francisco Perea and of Pedro Perea. His daughter, Dolores Elizabeth "Lola" Chávez de Armijo, is noted for her successful fight to keep her job as state librarian after Governor William C. McDonald attempted to remove her on the basis that she was a woman.

=== Early life ===
José Francisco Chaves attended schools in St. Louis, Missouri, studied medicine at the New York College of Physicians and Surgeons and engaged in livestock raising in the New Mexico Territory. He married Mary Bowie in 1857, who died in 1874, leaving two children, Lola and Francesca. The former married Mariano Armijo, descendant of a prominent family of Bernalillo County, New Mexico. The latter died in 1895.

Chaves served as a soldier in campaigns against the Navajos prior to the Civil War. At the outbreak of the Civil War, Governor Connelly commissioned Chaves as major when the 1st Regiment NM Volunteers for the Union Army formed. After Ceran St. Vrain resigned his commission with the 1st, Kit Carson was appointed colonel and Chaves was promoted to lt-colonel. In 1862 he took part in the Battle of Valverde. He was recognized for gallant and meritorious services, and later helped establish Fort Wingate, of which he was post commander for a long period. He was honorably mustered out of the service of the United States in 1865.

Chaves owned an Indigenous girl named Maria in 1860 to "mark his social wealth". It is likely that he abducted the thirteen-year-old girl either during a raid on an Indigenous community or by purchasing her at a rescate (auction). Chavez's mother and step-father owned as many as four enslaved Indigenous children.

=== Political career ===
Returning home he began to study law and in due course was admitted to the bar. In politics he was a staunch Republican and in 1858, while absent campaigning against the Navajos, was elected a member of the House of Representatives of the territorial legislative assembly, taking his seat in 1860. In 1865 he was elected delegate from the New Mexico Territory to the U.S. House of Representatives and served in the 39th and 40th Congresses from 1865 to 1867. He was elected back to the House of Representatives in 1868 and successfully contested the election of Charles P. Clever in 1869, serving again until 1871, being unsuccessful for reelection in 1870. In 1875, he was elected a member of the legislative council from Valencia County and was reelected to every succeeding legislature. Chaves was president of the New Mexico Territorial Council for eight sessions.

Chaves continued in farming and livestock raising. He was district attorney of the second judicial district from 1875 to 1877 and was a member and president of the New Mexico constitutional convention in 1889. He was New Mexico Superintendent of Public Instruction from 1903 to 1904 and was appointed New Mexico State Historian in 1903.

=== Death ===
Chaves career was cut short by an assassination in Pinoswells, New Mexico on November 26, 1904, where he was shot through a window while dining in the home of a friend. The identity of his assassin remains a mystery. He was interred in Santa Fe National Cemetery in Santa Fe, New Mexico.

== See also ==
- Hispanics in the American Civil War
- List of Hispanic and Latino Americans in the United States Congress
- List of assassinated American politicians

== Additional references ==
- United States Congress. "José Francisco Chaves (id: C000337)". Biographical Directory of the United States Congress. Retrieved on 2008-02-14
- Charles A. Curtis. Army Life in the West (1862-1865). CreateSpace Independent Publishing Platform, April 20, 2017. ISBN 978-1545458785.

U.S. House of Representatives
Preceded by Francisco Perea	Delegate to the U.S. House of Representatives from New Mexico Territory's at-large congressional district 1865–1867	Succeeded by Charles P. Clever
Preceded by Charles P. Clever	Delegate to the U.S. House of Representatives from New Mexico Territory's at-large congressional district 1869–1871	Succeeded by José Gallegos
