= 1868–69 United States House of Representatives elections =

House elections for the 41st U.S. Congress

- June 1, 1868 – August 2, 1869 (Note: Excludes states readmitted after the start of Congress.) (Note: The majority of States held elections on November 3, 1868 (i.e. "Election Day") for the first time.)

All 243 (Note: Including late elections.) seats in the United States House of Representatives 122 seats needed for a majority
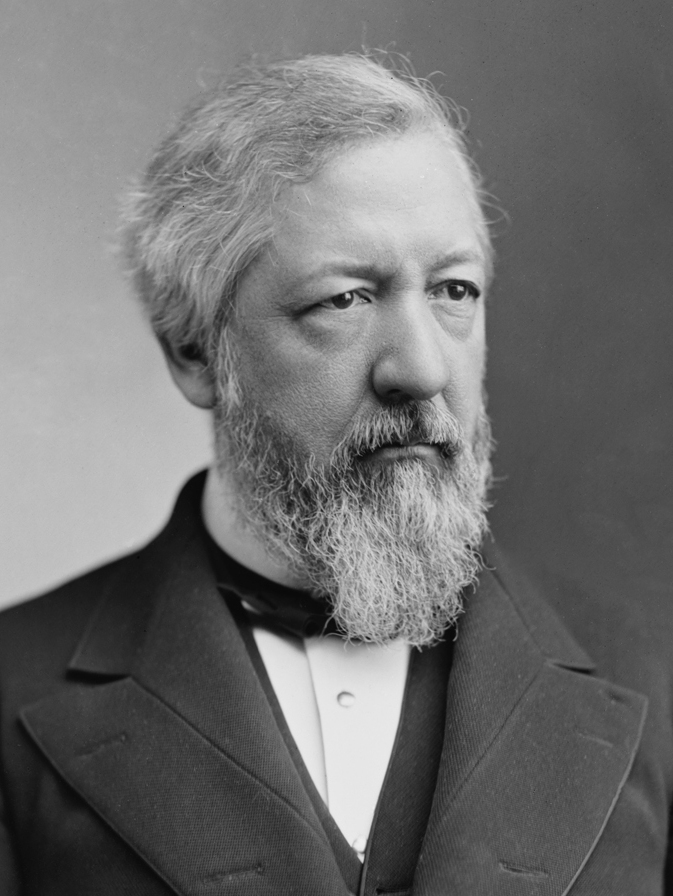

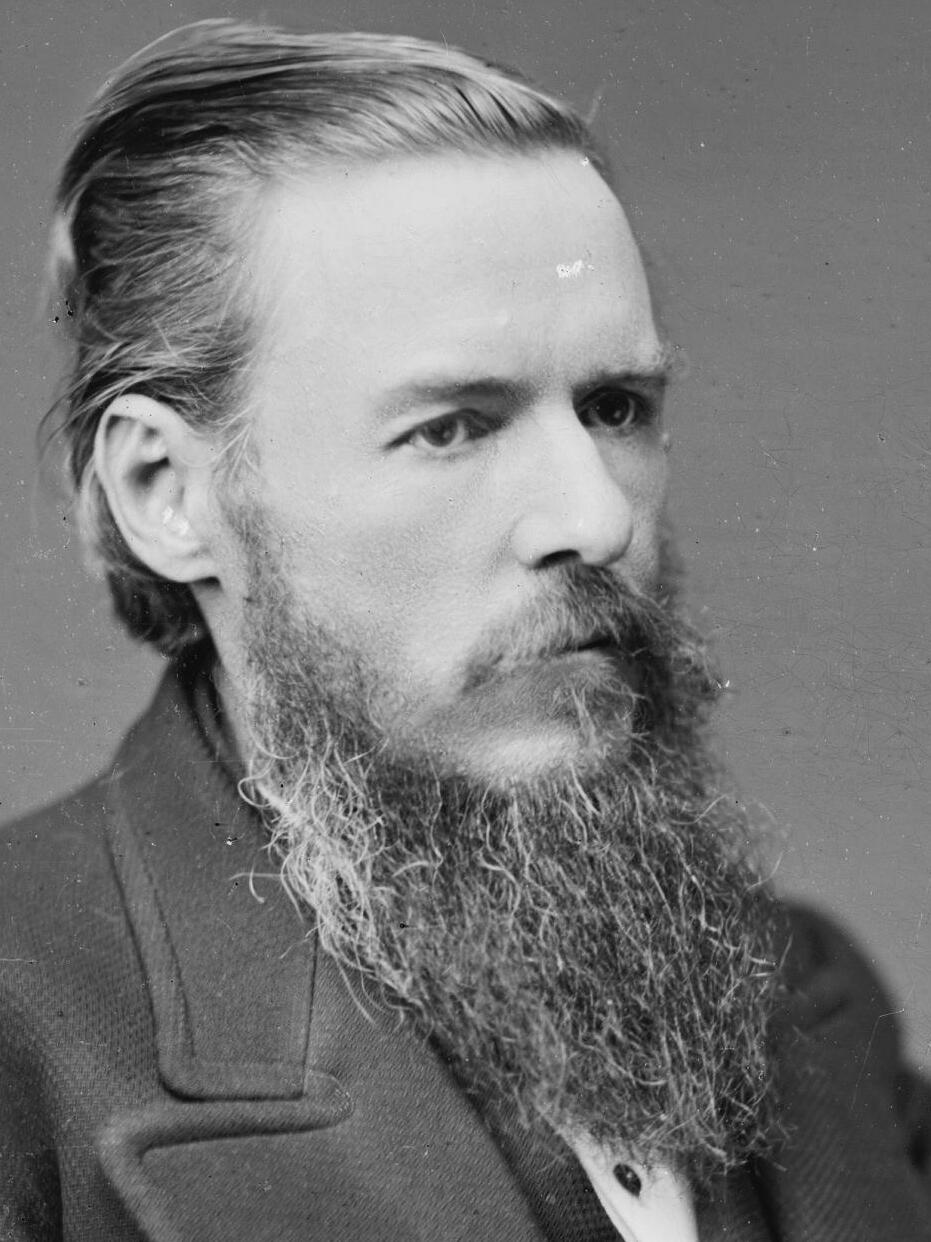
	Majority party	Minority party
Leader	James Blaine	Michael Kerr
Party	Republican	Democratic
Leader's seat	Maine 3rd	Indiana 3rd
Last election	175 seats	47 seats
Seats won	171	67
Seat change	▼4	▲20
Popular vote	3,050,307	2,598,042
Percentage	51.81%	44.13%
Swing	▼3.55pp	▲3.44pp
	Third party	Fourth party
Party	Conservative	Independent
Last election	2 seats	2 seats
Seats won	5	0
Seat change	▲3	▼2
Popular vote	187,553	58,332
Percentage	3.19%	0.99%
Swing	▲1.19pp	▼0.77pp
- Results of the 1868–69 U.S. House of Representatives elections. Shades of red indicate seats won by the Republican Party; shades of blue indicate seats won by the Democratic Party; shades of orange indicate seats won by the Conservative Party.
Speaker before election
Theodore M. Pomeroy
Republican
Elected Speaker
James Blaine
Republican

The 1868–69 United States House of Representatives elections were held on various dates in various states between June 1, 1868, to August 2, 1869. Each state set its own date for its elections to the House of Representatives before or after the first session of the 41st United States Congress convened on March 4, 1869. They coincided with the 1868 United States presidential election, which was won by Ulysses S. Grant. Elections were held for all 243 seats, representing 37 states. All of the former Confederate states were represented in Congress for the first time since they seceded from the Union.

The Democrats gained 20 seats, but Grant's Republican Party retained a commanding majority in the Reconstruction era following the American Civil War, holding onto a firm legitimacy through an association with victory. As more Southern states exited Reconstruction, more Democratic seats appeared in the South. However, Democratic gains in the South were limited, as the Republican powerbrokers of Reconstruction held a great deal of influence. The small Conservative Party of Virginia also picked up several seats in Virginia, as it had support among wealthy Southern leaders who wanted to increase the region's power.

== Election summary ==
Mississippi, Texas, and Virginia were readmitted during this Congress, leaving Congress without vacant State delegations for the first time since 1860. Georgia had been partially readmitted in the previous Congress, but was not initially admitted to the 41st Congress. With Georgia's final readmission in 1870, all former Confederate states were once more represented in Congress.

↓
67	5	171
Democratic	(Note: Conservatives won 5 seats.)	Republican

State	Type	Total seats	Democratic		Conservative		Republican	
State	Type	Total seats	Seats	Change	Seats	Change	Seats	Change
Alabama (Note: Elections held late.)	District	6	2	▲2	0	Steady	4	▼2
Arkansas	District	3	1	▲1	0	Steady	2	▼1
California	District	3	2	Steady	0	Steady	1	Steady
Connecticut	District	4	1	▼2	0	Steady	3	▲2
Delaware	At-large	1	1	Steady	0	Steady	0	Steady
Florida (Note: Elections held early.)	At-large	1	0	Steady	0	Steady	1	Steady
Georgia (Note: Readmitted state.)	District	7 (Note: Previous election had one vacancy.)	4	▲2	0	Steady	3	▼1
Illinois	District + 1 at-large	14	4	▲1	0	Steady	10	▼1
Indiana	District	11	4	▲1	0	Steady	7	▼1
Iowa	District	6	0	Steady	0	Steady	6	Steady
Kansas	At-large	1	0	Steady	0	Steady	1	Steady
Kentucky	District	9	9	▲2	0	Steady	0	▼1
Louisiana	District	5	0	▼1	0	Steady	5	▲1
Maine	District	5	0	Steady	0	Steady	5	Steady
Maryland	District	5	5	▲2	0	▼1	0	▼1
Massachusetts	District	10	0	Steady	0	Steady	10	Steady
Michigan	District	6	0	Steady	0	Steady	6	Steady
Minnesota	District	2	1	▲1	0	Steady	1	▼1
Mississippi	District	5	0	Steady	0	Steady	5	▲5
Missouri	District	9	2	▲1	0	Steady	7	▼1
Nebraska	At-large	1	0	Steady	0	Steady	1	Steady
Nevada	At-large	1	0	Steady	0	Steady	1	Steady
New Hampshire	District	3	0	Steady	0	Steady	3	Steady
New Jersey	District	5	3	▲1	0	Steady	2	▼1
New York	District	31	12	▲2	0	Steady	19	▼2
North Carolina	District	7	1	▲1	0	▼1	6	Steady
Ohio	District	19	6	▲3	0	Steady	13	▼3
Oregon	At-large	1	1	▲1	0	Steady	0	▼1
Pennsylvania	District	24	6	Steady	0	Steady	18	Steady
Rhode Island	District	2	0	Steady	0	Steady	2	Steady
South Carolina	District	4	0	Steady	0	Steady	4	Steady
Tennessee	District	8	0	Steady	0	Steady	8	Steady
Texas	District	4	1	▲1	0	Steady	3	▲3
Vermont	District	3	0	Steady	0	Steady	3	Steady
Virginia	District	8	0	Steady	5	▲5	3	▲3
West Virginia	District	3	0	Steady	0	Steady	3	Steady
Wisconsin	District	6	1	Steady	0	Steady	5	Steady
Total		243	67 27.6%	▲22	5 2.1%	▲3	171 70.4%	▼6

Results shaded according to winning candidate's share of vote

Popular vote
Republican	51.81%
Democratic	44.13%
Conservative	3.19%
Independent	0.99%
Others	0.00%

House seats
Republican	70.08%
Democratic	27.46%
Conservative	2.46%

== Election dates ==
Mississippi held rejected elections on July 1, 1868. New (accepted) elections were held December 1, 1869.

In 1845, Congress passed a law providing for a uniform nationwide date for choosing presidential electors. This law did not affect election dates for Congress, which remained within the jurisdiction of State governments, but over time, the States moved their congressional elections to that date. 1868 was the first year in which the majority of States (20 of 37) held their elections on that date. There were still 9 states which held elections before that date and 4 that held regular elections after that date, in addition to 4 readmitted states that held elections after that date.

- Early dates (1868):
  - June 1: Oregon
  - September 1: Vermont
  - September 14: Maine
  - October 13: Indiana, Iowa, Nebraska, Ohio, Pennsylvania
  - October 22: West Virginia
- ▌Late dates (regular elections):
  - December 29, 1868: Florida
  - March 9, 1869: New Hampshire
  - April 5, 1869: Connecticut
  - August 2, 1869: Alabama
- Readmitted states:
  - July 6, 1869: Virginia
  - December 1, 1869: Mississippi (also held elections to the 42nd Congress on the same day)
  - December 3, 1868: Texas
  - December 20–22, 1870: Georgia

== Special elections ==
There were special elections in 1868 and 1869 to the 40th United States Congress and 41st United States Congress.

Special elections are sorted by date then district.

=== 40th Congress ===
Readmission of state are treated here as regular (late) elections, not special elections.

District	Incumbent			This race	
District	Representative	Party	First elected	Results	Candidates
Ohio 8	Cornelius S. Hamilton	Republican	1866	Incumbent died December 22, 1867. New member elected January 27, 1868. Republican hold. Winner was later re-elected to the next term; see below.	▌ ✓ John Beatty (Republican) 52.02%; ▌Barnabus Burns (Democratic) 48.17%
Pennsylvania 9	Thaddeus Stevens	Republican	1848	Incumbent died August 11, 1868. New member elected October 13, 1868. Republican hold. Winner was also elected to the next term; see below.	▌ ✓ Oliver J. Dickey (Republican) 63.32%; ▌Robert Crane (Democratic) 36.68%
Pennsylvania 20	Darwin A. Finney	Republican	1866	Incumbent died August 25, 1868. New member elected October 13, 1868. Republican hold. Winner was not a candidate for the next term; see below.	▌ ✓ S. Newton Pettis (Republican) 52.21%; ▌James B. Knox (Democratic) 47.79%
Missouri 5	Joseph W. McClurg	Republican	1862	Incumbent resigned in July 1868. New member elected November 3, 1868. Republican hold. Winner was not a candidate for the next term; see below.	▌ ✓ John H. Stover (Republican) 59.48%; ▌Ignatius Hazel (Democratic) 40.52%
Arkansas 2	James M. Hinds	Republican	1868	Incumbent died October 22, 1868. New member elected on an unknown date. Republican hold. Winner was not elected to the next term; see below.	▌ ✓ James T. Elliott (Republican); [data missing]

=== 41st Congress ===
Readmission of state are treated here as regular (late) elections, not special elections.

District	Incumbent			This race	
District	Representative	Party	First elected	Results	Candidates
Massachusetts 7	George S. Boutwell	Republican	1862	Incumbent resigned March 12, 1869, after being appointed Secretary of the Treasury. New member elected November 2, 1869. Republican hold.	▌ ✓ George M. Brooks (Republican) 67.28%; ▌Leverett Saltonstall II (Democratic) 32.72%
Illinois 3	Elihu B. Washburne	Republican	1852	Incumbent resigned March 6, 1869, to become U.S. Secretary of State. New member elected December 6, 1869. Republican hold.	▌ ✓ Horatio C. Burchard (Republican) 76.06%; ▌John Vigers Eustace (Democratic) 22.56%; Scattered 1.38%

== Alabama ==
=== 1868 elections to finish the term ===
District	Incumbent			This race	
District	Member	Party	First elected	Results	Candidates
Alabama 1	None			State readmitted. Republican gain.	▌ ✓ Francis William Kellogg (Republican) 100.0%
Alabama 2	None			State readmitted. Republican gain.	▌ ✓ Charles W. Buckley (Republican) 100.0%
Alabama 3	None			State readmitted. Republican gain.	▌ ✓ Benjamin White Norris (Republican) 99.6%
Alabama 4	None			State readmitted. Republican gain.	▌ ✓ Charles Wilson Pierce (Republican) 99.8%
Alabama 5	None			State readmitted. Republican gain.	▌ ✓ John Benton Callis (Republican) 54.0%; ▌ Joseph Walter Burke (Republican) 37.2%; ▌ Whitley Thomas Ewing (Republican) 8.7%
Alabama 6	None			State readmitted. Republican gain.	▌ ✓ Thomas Haughey (Republican) 44.1%; ▌ [FNU] McCauley (Republican) 23.7%; ▌ [FNU] Cramer (Republican) 16.8%; ▌ [FNU] Snelling (Republican) 13.6%

=== 1869 elections to the next term ===
District	Incumbent			This race	
District	Member	Party	First elected	Results	Candidates
Alabama 1	Francis William Kellogg	Republican	1868	Incumbent retired. Republican hold.	▌ ✓ Alfred Eliab Buck (Republican) 54.0%; ▌ William d'Alton Mann (Democratic) 46.0%
Alabama 2	Charles W. Buckley	Republican	1868	Incumbent re-elected.	▌ ✓ Charles W. Buckley (Republican) 58.1%; ▌ A. N. Worthy (Democratic) 41.9%
Alabama 3	Benjamin White Norris	Republican	1868	Incumbent lost renomination. Republican hold.	▌ ✓ Robert Stell Heflin (Republican) 50.6%; ▌ J. C. Parkinson (Democratic) 49.4%
Alabama 4	Charles Wilson Pierce	Republican	1868	Incumbent retired. Republican hold.	▌ ✓ Charles Hays (Republican) 71.5%; ▌ John B. Reed (Democratic) 20.2%; ▌ C. W. Dunstan (Independent) 8.3%
Alabama 5	John Benton Callis	Republican	1868	Incumbent retired. Democratic gain.	▌ ✓ Peter M. Dox (Democratic) 55.1%; ▌ W. J. Haralson (Republican) 44.9%
Alabama 6	Thomas Haughey	Republican	1868	Incumbent lost renomination and lost re-election as an Independent Republican candidate. Democratic gain.	▌ ✓ William Crawford Sherrod (Democratic) 57.7%; ▌ J. J. Hinds (Republican) 33.2%; ▌ Thomas Haughey (Ind. Republican) 9.1%

== Arkansas ==
District	Incumbent			This race	
District	Representative	Party	First elected	Results	Candidates
Arkansas 1	None			State readmitted. Republican gain.	▌ ✓ Logan H. Roots (Republican) 50.6%; ▌Charles S. Cameron (Democratic) 49.4%
Arkansas 2	None			State readmitted. Democratic gain.	▌ ✓ Anthony A. C. Rogers (Democratic) 55.0%; ▌James T. Elliott (Republican) 45.0%
Arkansas 3	None			State readmitted. Republican gain.	▌ ✓ Thomas Boles (Republican) 62.9%; ▌L. B. Nash (Democratic) 37.1%

== California ==
California elections
- November 3, 1868

All 3 seats
	Majority party	Minority party
Party	Democratic	Republican
Last election	2	1
Seats won	2	1
Seat change	Steady	Steady
Popular vote	54,548	53,873
Percentage	50.3%	49.7%
- Democratic hold Republican hold

California's delegation remained at two Democrats and one Republican.

District	Incumbent			This race	
District	Representative	Party	First elected	Results	Candidates
California 1	Samuel Beach Axtell	Democratic	1867	Incumbent re-elected.	▌ ✓ Samuel Beach Axtell (Democratic) 54.1%; ▌Frank M. Pixley (Republican) 45.9%
California 2	William Higby	Republican	1863	Incumbent lost renomination. Republican hold.	▌ ✓ Aaron A. Sargent (Republican) 54.7%; ▌James W. Coffroth (Democratic) 45.3%
California 3	James A. Johnson	Democratic	1867	Incumbent re-elected.	▌ ✓ James A. Johnson (Democratic) 50.4%; ▌Chancellor Hartson (Republican) 49.6%

== Colorado Territory ==
See non-voting delegates, below.

== Dakota Territory ==
See non-voting delegates, below.

== Connecticut ==
District	Incumbent			This race	
District	Member	Party	First elected	Results	Candidates
Connecticut 1	Richard D. Hubbard	Democratic	1867	Incumbent retired. Republican gain.	▌ ✓ Julius L. Strong (Republican) 51.6%; ▌James Dixon (Democratic) 48.4%
Connecticut 2	Julius Hotchkiss	Democratic	1867	Incumbent retired. Republican gain.	▌ ✓ Stephen Kellogg (Republican) 50.8%; ▌James F. Babcock (Democratic) 49.2%
Connecticut 3	Henry H. Starkweather	Republican	1867	Incumbent re-elected.	▌ ✓ Henry H. Starkweather (Republican) 57.5%; ▌Abiel Converse (Democratic) 42.5%
Connecticut 4	William Barnum	Democratic	1867	Incumbent re-elected.	▌ ✓ William Barnum (Democratic) 52.3%; ▌Sidney B. Beardsley (Republican) 47.7%

== Delaware ==
District	Incumbent			This race	
District	Member	Party	First elected	Results	Candidates
Delaware at-large	John A. Nicholson	Democratic	1864	Incumbent retired. Democratic hold.	▌ ✓ Benjamin T. Biggs (Democratic) 58.9%; ▌ Alfred T. Torbert (Republican) 41.1%

== Florida ==
United States House of Representatives elections in Florida, 1868
- May 5, 1868 and December 29, 1868

Florida's single seat in the U.S. House of Representatives
	Majority party	Minority party	Third party
Party	Republican	Democratic	Independent
Seats won	1	0	0
Popular vote	14,108	7,915	2,276
Percentage	58.1%	32.6%	9.4%

Florida had been unrepresented in Congress since January 21, 1861, when its sole member and both senators withdrew from Congress following the secession of Florida from the Union. Following the end of the Civil War, an election had been held in 1865, but it was rejected by Congress. In 1868, Congress readmitted Florida following Reconstruction.

=== Election to the current term ===
The first election, for the duration of the 40th congress, was held May 5, 1868.

District	Incumbent			This race	
District	Representative	Party	First elected	Results	Candidates
Florida at-large	None			State readmitted. New member elected May 5, 1868 to finish the term and seated July 1, 1868. Republican gain. Winner was later re-elected to the next term.	▌ ✓ Charles M. Hamilton (Republican) 58.1%; ▌John Friend (Democratic) 32.6%; ▌Liberty Billings (Independent) 9.4%

Hamilton was seated on July 1, 1868, during the 2nd session of the 40th Congress.

=== Election to the next term ===
Florida elected its one at-large member on December 29, 1868, re-electing Hamilton, who had just been elected in May to finish the current term.

District	Incumbent			This race	
District	Representative	Party	First elected	Results	Candidates
Florida at-large	Charles M. Hamilton	Republican	1868 (Note: Late election to 40th Congress.)	Re-elected	▌ ✓ Charles M. Hamilton (Republican) 56.4%; ▌W. D. Barnes (Democratic) 38.5%; ▌William U. Saunders (Independent) 5.1%

== Georgia ==
Despite not being formally readmitted, members were elected on April 20, 1868, to fill the vacant seats for the remainder of the 40th congress. However, these members were not permitted to qualify for the 41st congress under the same election and all seats were thus vacant during the 41st congress. Georgia was formally readmitted on July 15, 1870.

District	Incumbent			This race	
District	Member	Party	First elected	Results	Candidates
Georgia 1	None			State partially readmitted. Republican gain.	▌ ✓ Joseph W. Clift (Republican) 59.6%; ▌ Henry S. Fitch (Democratic) 40.4%
Georgia 2	None			State partially readmitted. Democratic gain.	▌ ✓ Nelson Tift (Democratic) 53.9%; ▌ Richard H. Whiteley (Republican) 46.2%
Georgia 3	None			State partially readmitted. Republican gain.	▌ ✓ William P. Edwards (Republican) 52.5%; ▌ [FNU] Alexander (Democratic) 47.5%
Georgia 4	None			State partially readmitted. Republican gain.	▌ ✓ Samuel F. Gove (Republican) 50.4%; ▌ Osborne A. Lochrane (Democratic) 49.6%
Georgia 5	None			State partially readmitted. Republican gain.	▌ ✓ Charles H. Prince (Republican); ▌ Henry W. Hilliard (Democratic)
Georgia 6	None			State partially readmitted. Vacant. Elected member not permitted to qualify.	▌ ✓ John H. Christy (Democratic) 51.3%; ▌ John A. Wimpey (Republican) 48.7%
Georgia 7	None			State partially readmitted. Democratic gain.	▌ ✓ Pierce M. B. Young (Democratic) 58.1%; ▌ James Adkins (Republican) 41.9%

== Idaho Territory ==
See non-voting delegates, below.

== Illinois ==
District	Incumbent			This race	
District	Member	Party	First elected	Results	Candidates
Illinois 1	Norman B. Judd	Republican	1866	Incumbent re-elected.	▌ ✓ Norman B. Judd (Republican) 58.8%; ▌ Martin R. M. Wallace (Democratic) 41.2%
Illinois 2	John F. Farnsworth	Republican	1862	Incumbent re-elected.	▌ ✓ John F. Farnsworth (Republican) 76.7%; ▌ Augustus M. Herrington (Democratic) 23.3%
Illinois 3	Elihu B. Washburne	Republican	1852	Incumbent re-elected.	▌ ✓ Elihu B. Washburne (Republican) 65.9%; ▌ W. J. McKim (Democratic) 34.1%
Illinois 4	Abner C. Harding	Republican	1864	Incumbent retired. Republican hold.	▌ ✓ John B. Hawley (Republican) 52.6%; ▌ James W. Singleton (Democratic) 47.4%
Illinois 5	Ebon C. Ingersoll	Republican	1864	Incumbent re-elected.	▌ ✓ Ebon C. Ingersoll (Republican) 60.2%; ▌ John N. Niglas (Democratic) 39.2%
Illinois 6	Burton C. Cook	Republican	1864	Incumbent re-elected.	▌ ✓ Burton C. Cook (Republican) 62.1%; ▌ Oliver C. Gray (Democratic) 37.9%
Illinois 7	Henry P. H. Bromwell	Republican	1864	Incumbent retired. Republican hold.	▌ ✓ Jesse H. Moore (Republican) 56.5%; ▌ Thomas Brewer (Democratic) 43.5%
Illinois 8	Shelby M. Cullom	Republican	1864	Incumbent re-elected.	▌ ✓ Shelby M. Cullom (Republican) 53.5%; ▌ Benjamin S. Edwards (Democratic) 46.5%
Illinois 9	Lewis Winans Ross	Democratic	1862	Incumbent retired. Democratic hold.	▌ ✓ Thompson W. McNeely (Democratic ) 53.9%; ▌ Leonard Fulton Ross (Republican) 46.1%
Illinois 10	Albert G. Burr	Democratic	1866	Incumbent re-elected.	▌ ✓ Albert G. Burr (Democratic ) 55.2%; ▌ Iona B. Turner (Republican) 44.8%
Illinois 11	Samuel S. Marshall	Democratic	1864	Incumbent re-elected.	▌ ✓ Samuel S. Marshall (Democratic) 55.2%; ▌ James Stewart Martin (Republican) 44.8%
Illinois 12	Jehu Baker	Republican	1864	Incumbent retired. Republican hold.	▌ ✓ John B. Hay (Republican) 52.9%; ▌ William M. Snyder (Democratic) 47.1%
Illinois 13	Green B. Raum	Republican	1866	Incumbent lost re-election. Democratic gain.	▌ ✓ John M. Crebs (Democratic) 50.9%; ▌ Green B. Raum (Republican) 49.1%
Illinois at-large	John A. Logan	Republican	1866	Incumbent re-elected.	▌ ✓ John A. Logan (Republican) 55.5%; ▌ William W. O'Brien (Democratic) 44.5%

== Indiana ==
District	Incumbent			This race	
District	Member	Party	First elected	Results	Candidates
Indiana 1	William E. Niblack	Democratic	1864	Incumbent re-elected.	▌ ✓ William E. Niblack (Democratic) 52.1%; ▌ James C. Veatch (Republican) 47.9%
Indiana 2	Michael C. Kerr	Democratic	1864	Incumbent re-elected.	▌ ✓ Michael C. Kerr (Democratic) 60.3%; ▌ Walter Q. Gresham (Republican) 39.7%
Indiana 3	William S. Holman; Redistricted from the 4th district.	Democratic	1866	Incumbent re-elected.	▌ ✓ William S. Holman (Democratic) 51.3%; ▌ Robert N. Lamb (Republican) 48.8%
Indiana 4	George W. Julian; Redistricted from the 5th district.	Republican	1860	Incumbent re-elected.	▌ ✓ George W. Julian (Republican) 50.2%; ▌ John S. Reid (Democratic) 49.8%
Indiana 5	John Coburn; Redistricted from the 6th district.	Republican	1866	Incumbent re-elected.	▌ ✓ John Coburn (Republican) 51.7%; ▌ John W. Keightley (Democratic) 48.3%
Indiana 6	Morton C. Hunter; Redistricted from the 3rd district.	Republican	1866	Incumbent retired. Democratic gain.	▌ ✓ Daniel W. Voorhees (Democratic) 50.2%; ▌ W W. Carter (Republican) 49.8%
Indiana 6	Henry D. Washburn; Redistricted from the 7th district.	Republican	1864	Incumbent retired Republican Loss.	▌ ✓ Daniel W. Voorhees (Democratic) 50.2%; ▌ W W. Carter (Republican) 49.8%
Indiana 7	Godlove S. Orth; Redistricted from the 8th district.	Republican	1862	Incumbent re-elected.	▌ ✓ Godlove S. Orth (Republican) 50.7%; ▌ Mahlon D. Manson (Democratic) 49.3%
Indiana 8	None (new district)			New district. Republican gain. Elected member resigned his seat before the beginning of the term due to his election as a senator.	▌ ✓ Daniel D. Pratt (Republican) 53.5%; ▌ John Ross (Democratic) 46.5%
Indiana 9	John P. C. Shanks; Redistricted from the 11th district.	Republican	1866	Incumbent re-elected.	▌ ✓ John P. C. Shanks (Republican) 51.6%; ▌ Robert Lowry (Democratic) 48.4%
Indiana 10	William Williams	Republican	1866	Incumbent re-elected.	▌ ✓ William Williams (Republican) 53.8%; ▌ Andrew Ellison (Democratic) 46.2%
Indiana 11	Schuyler Colfax; Redistricted from the 9th district.	Republican	1854	Incumbent retired to run for vice president. Republican hold.	▌ ✓ Jasper Packard (Republican) 52.1%; ▌ Mulford K. Farrand (Democratic) 48.0%

== Iowa ==
District	Incumbent			This race	
District	Member	Party	First elected	Results	Candidates
Iowa 1	James F. Wilson	Republican	1861	Incumbent retired. Republican hold.	▌ ✓ George W. McCrary (Republican) 58.2%; ▌ Thomas W. Clagett (Democratic) 41.8%
Iowa 2	Hiram Price	Republican	1862	Incumbent retired. Republican hold.	▌ ✓ William Smyth (Republican) 58.6%; ▌ William Leffingwell (Democratic) 41.4%
Iowa 3	William B. Allison	Republican	1862	Incumbent re-elected.	▌ ✓ William B. Allison (Republican) 58.5%; ▌ William Mills (Democratic) 41.1%; ▌ T. D. Thomas (Independent) 0.4%
Iowa 4	William Loughridge	Republican	1866	Incumbent re-elected.	▌ ✓ William Loughridge (Republican) 59.3%; ▌ John P. Irish (Democratic) 40.7%
Iowa 5	Grenville M. Dodge	Republican	1866	Incumbent retired. Republican hold.	▌ ✓ Francis W. Palmer (Republican) 60.4%; ▌ P. Gad Bryan (Democratic) 39.6%
Iowa 6	Asahel W. Hubbard	Republican	1862	Incumbent retired. Republican hold.	▌ ✓ Charles Pomeroy (Republican) 72.8%; ▌ G. A. L. Roszell (Democratic) 27.2%

== Kansas ==
District	Incumbent			This race	
District	Member	Party	First elected	Results	Candidates
Kansas at-large	Sidney Clarke	Republican	1864	Incumbent re-elected.	▌ ✓ Sidney Clarke (Republican) 67.7%; ▌ Charles W. Blair (Democratic) 32.3%

== Kentucky ==
District	Incumbent			This race	
District	Member	Party	First elected	Results	Candidates
Kentucky 1	Lawrence S. Trimble	Democratic	1865	Incumbent re-elected.	▌ ✓ Lawrence S. Trimble (Democratic) 87.0%; ▌ Charles A. Marshall (Republican) 11.1%; ▌ [FNU] Johnson (Independent ) 1.9%
Kentucky 2	Vacant. Congress refused to seat John Y. Brown and the seat remained vacant for the term.			New member elected. Democratic gain.	▌ ✓ William N. Sweeney (Democratic) 78.3%; ▌ Samuel W. Langley (Republican) 21.7%
Kentucky 3	Jacob Golladay	Democratic	1867	Incumbent re-elected.	▌ ✓ Jacob Golladay (Democratic) 80.4%; ▌ William E. Hobson (Republican) 19.6%
Kentucky 4	J. Proctor Knott	Democratic	1867	Incumbent re-elected.	▌ ✓ J. Proctor Knott (Democratic) 87.9%; ▌ William H. Hays (Republican) 12.1%
Kentucky 5	Asa Grover	Democratic	1867	Incumbent retired. Democratic hold.	▌ ✓ Boyd Winchester (Democratic) 90.9%; ▌ J. B. English (Republican) 9.1%
Kentucky 6	Thomas L. Jones	Democratic	1867	Incumbent re-elected.	▌ ✓ Thomas L. Jones (Democratic) 69.7%; ▌ Oliver W. Root (Republican) 30.4%
Kentucky 7	James B. Beck	Democratic	1867	Incumbent re-elected.	▌ ✓ James B. Beck (Democratic) 84.6%; ▌ Charles Eginton (Republican) 15.4%
Kentucky 8	George Madison Adams	Democratic	1867	Incumbent re-elected.	▌ ✓ George Madison Adams (Democratic) 51.1%; ▌ Sydney M. Barnes (Republican) 48.9%
Kentucky 9	Samuel McKee	Republican	1865	Incumbent retired. Democratic gain.	▌ ✓ John McConnell Rice (Democratic) 61.2%; ▌ J. L. Zeigler (Republican) 38.8%

== Louisiana ==
1868 Elections to finish term

(results unavailable)

District	Incumbent			This race	
District	Member	Party	First elected	Results	Candidates
Louisiana 1	None			State readmitted. Republican gain.	▌ ✓ J. Hale Sypher (Republican)
Louisiana 2	None			State readmitted. Democratic gain.	▌ ✓ James Mann (Democratic)
Louisiana 3	None			State readmitted. Republican gain.	▌ ✓ Joseph P. Newsham (Republican)
Louisiana 4	None			State readmitted. Republican gain.	▌ ✓ Michel Vidal (Republican)
Louisiana 5	None			State readmitted. Republican gain.	▌ ✓ W. Jasper Blackburn (Republican)

1868 Elections to new term

(Initial results annulled)

District	Incumbent			This race	
District	Member	Party	First elected	Results	Candidates
Louisiana 1	J. Hale Sypher	Republican	1868	Election annulled and seat declared vacant	▌ Louis St. Martin (Democratic) 85.1%; ▌ J. Hale Sypher (Republican) 15.0%; Initial result annulled.
Louisiana 2	James Mann	Democratic	1868	Incumbent died. Election annulled and Republican candidate seated. Republican gain.	▌ Caleb S. Hunt (Democratic) 44.8%; ▌ ✓ Lionel Allen Sheldon (Republican) 29.3%; ▌ John Willis Menard (Republican) 26.0%; Initial result annulled
Louisiana 3	None (new district)			Election annulled and Republican candidate seated. Republican gain.	▌ Adolphe Bailey (Democratic) 67.1%; ▌ ✓ Chester Bidwell Darrall (Republican) 32.9%; Initial result annulled
Louisiana 4	Joseph P. Newsham; Redistricted from the 3rd district.	Republican	1868	Election annulled and Republican Incumbent seated.	▌ Michael Ryan (Democratic) 64.4%; ▌ ✓ Joseph P. Newsham (Republican) 35.6%; Initial result annulled
Louisiana 4	Michel Vidal	Republican	1868	Incumbent retired. Republican loss.	▌ Michael Ryan (Democratic) 64.4%; ▌ ✓ Joseph P. Newsham (Republican) 35.6%; Initial result annulled
Louisiana 5	W. Jasper Blackburn	Republican	1868	Incumbent retired. Election annulled and Republican candidate seated. Republican hold.	▌ G. W. McCranie (Democratic) 67.9%; ▌ ✓ Frank Morey (Republican) 16.9%; ▌ P. J. Kennedy (Republican) 15.2%; Initial result annulled

== Maine ==
District	Incumbent			This race	
District	Member	Party	First elected	Results	Candidates
Maine 1	John Lynch	Republican	1864	Incumbent re-elected.	▌ ✓ John Lynch (Republican) 53.6%; ▌ Charles A. Shaw (Democratic) 46.4%
Maine 2	Sidney Perham	Republican	1862	Incumbent retired. Republican hold.	▌ ✓ Samuel P. Morrill (Republican) 59.6%; ▌ Alonzo Garcelon (Democratic) 40.3%
Maine 3	James G. Blaine	Republican	1862	Incumbent re-elected.	▌ ✓ James G. Blaine (Republican) 57.3%; ▌ E. Wilder Farley (Democratic) 42.6%
Maine 4	John A. Peters	Republican	1866	Incumbent re-elected.	▌ ✓ John A. Peters (Republican) 61.2%; ▌ George W. Ladd (Democratic) 38.1%
Maine 5	Frederick A. Pike	Republican	1860	Incumbent lost renomination. Republican hold.	▌ ✓ Eugene Hale (Republican) 55.2%; ▌ Arno Wiswell (Democratic) 44.9%

== Maryland ==
District	Incumbent			This race	
District	Member	Party	First elected	Results	Candidates
Maryland 1	Hiram McCullough	Democratic	1864	Incumbent retired. Democratic hold.	▌ ✓ Samuel Hambleton (Democratic) 73.4%; ▌ Henry R. Torbert (Republican) 26.6%
Maryland 2	Stevenson Archer	Democratic	1866	Incumbent re-elected.	▌ ✓ Stevenson Archer (Democratic) 68.6%; ▌ John T. Ensor (Republican) 31.4%
Maryland 3	Charles E. Phelps	Conservative	1864	Incumbent retired. Democratic gain.	▌ ✓ Thomas Swann (Democratic) 69.7%; ▌ Adam E. King (Republican) 30.3%
Maryland 4	Francis Thomas	Republican	1861	Incumbent retired. Democratic gain.	▌ ✓ Patrick Hamill (Democratic) 51.3%; ▌ Daniel E. Weisel (Republican) 48.7%
Maryland 5	Frederick Stone	Democratic	1866	Incumbent re-elected.	▌ ✓ Frederick Stone (Democratic) 82.0%; ▌ William Albert (Republican) 18.0%

== Massachusetts ==
Massachusetts' Results

District	Incumbent			This race	
District	Member	Party	First elected	Results	Candidates
Massachusetts 1	Thomas D. Eliot	Republican	1858	Incumbent retired. Republican hold.	▌ ✓ James Buffinton (Republican) 78.82%; ▌Philander Cobb (Democratic) 21.18%
Massachusetts 2	Oakes Ames	Republican	1862	Incumbent re-elected.	▌ ✓ Oakes Ames (Republican) 71.80%; ▌Edward Avery (Democratic) 28.20%
Massachusetts 3	Ginery Twichell	Republican	1866	Incumbent re-elected.	▌ ✓ Ginery Twichell (Republican) 56.83%; ▌Edwin C. Bailey (Democratic) 43.17%
Massachusetts 4	Samuel Hooper	Republican	1861 (special)	Incumbent re-elected.	▌ ✓ Samuel Hooper (Republican) 56.87%; ▌Peter Harry (Democratic) 43.13%
Massachusetts 5	Benjamin Butler	Republican	1866	Incumbent re-elected.	▌ ✓ Benjamin Butler (Republican) 65.61%; ▌Otis Lord (Democratic) 25.33%; ▌Richard Henry Dana Jr. (Ind. Republican) 9.06%
Massachusetts 6	Nathaniel P. Banks	Republican	1865 (special)	Incumbent re-elected.	▌ ✓ Nathaniel P. Banks (Republican) 65.97%; ▌Frederick O. Prince (Democratic) 34.03%
Massachusetts 7	George S. Boutwell	Republican	1862	Incumbent re-elected.	▌ ✓ George S. Boutwell (Republican) 65.38%; ▌Leverett Saltonstall (Democratic) 34.62%
Massachusetts 8	George F. Hoar	Republican	1862	Incumbent retired. Republican hold.	▌ ✓ George F. Hoar (Republican) 74.20%; ▌Henry H. Stevens (Democratic) 25.80%
Massachusetts 9	William B. Washburn	Republican	1862	Incumbent re-elected.	▌ ✓ William B. Washburn (Republican) 82.89%; ▌Levi Haywood (Democratic) 17.11%
Massachusetts 10	Henry L. Dawes	Republican	1856	Incumbent re-elected.	▌ ✓ Henry L. Dawes (Republican) 62.08%; ▌Abijah W. Chapin (Democratic) 37.92%

== Michigan ==
District	Incumbent			This race	
District	Member	Party	First elected	Results	Candidates
Michigan 1	Fernando C. Beaman	Republican	1860	Incumbent re-elected.	▌ ✓ Fernando C. Beaman (Republican) 51.9%; ▌ Merrill I. Mills (Democratic) 48.1%
Michigan 2	Charles Upson	Republican	1862	Incumbent retired. Republican hold.	▌ ✓ William L. Stoughton (Republican) 59.2%; ▌ Henry Chamberlain (Democratic) 40.8%
Michigan 3	Austin Blair	Republican	1866	Incumbent re-elected.	▌ ✓ Austin Blair (Republican) 54.2%; ▌ Isaac M. Crane (Democratic) 45.8%
Michigan 4	Thomas W. Ferry	Republican	1864	Incumbent re-elected.	▌ ✓ Thomas W. Ferry (Republican) 62.7%; ▌ Lyman G. Mason (Democratic) 37.3%
Michigan 5	Rowland E. Trowbridge	Republican	1864	Incumbent lost renomination. Republican hold.	▌ ✓ Omar D. Conger (Republican) 52.8%; ▌ Byron G. Stout (Democratic) 47.2%
Michigan 6	John F. Driggs	Republican	1862	Incumbent retired. Republican hold.	▌ ✓ Randolph Strickland (Republican) 54.6%; ▌ William Newton (Democratic) 45.4%

== Minnesota ==
District	Incumbent			This race	
District	Member	Party	First elected	Results	Candidates
Minnesota 1	William Windom	Republican	1859	Incumbent retired. Republican hold.	▌ ✓ Morton S. Wilkinson (Republican) 61.9%; ▌ G. W. Batchelder (Democratic) 38.1%
Minnesota 2	Ignatius L. Donnelly	Republican	1862	Incumbent lost renomination and lost re-election as an Independent Republican candidate. Democratic gain.	▌ ✓ Eugene M. Wilson (Democratic) 40.5%; ▌ Ignatius L. Donnelly (Independent Republican) 33.8%; ▌ Christopher Columbus Andrews (Republican) 25.8%

== Mississippi ==
=== 1868 rejected elections ===
Mississippi elected its members July 1, 1868, but that election was later rejected by the House.

District	Incumbent			This race	
District	Representative	Party	First elected	Results	Candidates
Mississippi 1	None, seat not admitted			New member elected, but election rejected by the House.	▌ ✓ Charles Townsend (Democratic) 65.45%; ▌Jefferson L. Wofford (Republican) 34.55%
Mississippi 2	None, seat not admitted			New member elected, but election rejected by the House.	▌ ✓ T. N. Martin (Democratic) 65.47%; ▌Jehiel Railsback (Republican) 34.53%
Mississippi 3	None, seat not admitted			New member elected, but election rejected by the House.	▌ ✓ G. P. Turner (Democratic) 53.43%; ▌Charles A. Sullivan (Republican) 46.57%
Mississippi 4	None, seat not admitted			New member elected, but election rejected by the House.	▌ ✓ George McKee (Republican) 56.86%; ▌George L. Potter (Democratic) 43.14%
Mississippi 5	None, seat not admitted			New member elected, but election rejected by the House.	▌ ✓ William T. Martin (Democratic) 51.63%; ▌Legrand W. Perce (Republican) 48.37%

=== 1869 accepted elections ===
Mississippi then held new elections December 1, 1869 both: to finish the term in the 40th Congress and to the next term (starting in 1871) in the 41st Congress. Both elections had the same vote totals and were accepted by the House. The new members were seated in 1870.

District	Incumbent			This race	
District	Representative	Party	First elected	Results	Candidates
Mississippi 1	None, seat not admitted			New member elected to finish the term and to the next term. Republican gain.	▌ ✓ George E. Harris (Republican) 59.96%; ▌Jefferson L. Wofford (Democratic) 37.52%; ▌R. B. Avery (Independent) 2.52%
Mississippi 2	None, seat not admitted			New member elected to finish the term and to the next term. Republican gain.	▌ ✓ Joseph L. Morphis (Republican) 59.05%; ▌William Kellogg (Democratic) 31.51%; ▌J. H. Tatum (Independent) 9.44%
Mississippi 3	None, seat not admitted			New member elected to finish the term and to the next term. Republican gain.	▌ ✓ Henry W. Barry (Republican) 62.22%; ▌Schuyler B. Steers (Democratic) 29.07%; ▌J. D. Leflore (Independent) 8.71%
Mississippi 4	None, seat not admitted			New member elected to finish the term and to the next term. Republican gain.	▌ ✓ George McKee (Republican) 71.57%; ▌Archie C. Fisk (Democratic) 27.97%; Scattering <1.0%
Mississippi 5	None, seat not admitted			New member elected to finish the term and to the next term. Republican gain.	▌ ✓ Legrand W. Perce (Republican) 66.62%; ▌Leroy S. Bronn (Democratic) 33.38%

== Missouri ==
Missouri elected its members on November 3, 1868.

District	Incumbent			This race	
District	Member	Party	First elected	Results	Candidates
Missouri 1	William A. Pile	Radical	1866	Incumbent lost re-election. Democratic gain.	▌ ✓ Erastus Wells (Democratic) 50.47%; ▌William A. Pile (Radical) 49.53%
Missouri 2	Carman Newcomb	Radical	1866	Incumbent retired. Radical hold.	▌ ✓ Gustavus A. Finkelnburg (Radical) 58.15%; ▌James J. Lindley (Democratic) 41.85%
Missouri 3	James R. McCormick	Democratic	1867 (special)	Incumbent re-elected.	▌ ✓ James R. McCormick (Democratic) 54.94%; ▌John F. Bush (Radical) 45.06%
Missouri 4	Joseph J. Gravely	Radical	1866	Incumbent retired. Radical hold.	▌ ✓ Sempronius H. Boyd (Radical) 58.48%; ▌Charles B. McAfee (Democratic) 32.46%; ▌John R. Kelso (Radical) 9.07%
Missouri 5	John H. Stover	Radical	1868 (special)	Incumbent retired. Radical hold.	▌ ✓ Samuel S. Burdett (Radical) 58.48%; ▌John F. Philips (Democratic) 41.52%
Missouri 6	Robert T. Van Horn	Radical	1864	Incumbent re-elected.	▌ ✓ Robert T. Van Horn (Radical) 54.34%; ▌James Shields (Democratic) 45.66%
Missouri 7	Benjamin F. Loan	Radical	1862	Incumbent retired. Radical hold.	▌ ✓ Joel F. Asper (Radical) 65.54%; ▌Mordecai Oliver (Democratic) 34.46%
Missouri 8	John F. Benjamin	Radical	1864	Incumbent re-elected.	▌ ✓ John F. Benjamin (Radical) 51.75%; ▌John F. Williams (Democratic) 48.25%
Missouri 9	George W. Anderson	Radical	1864	Incumbent retired. Radical hold.	▌ ✓ David P. Dyer (Radical) 52.08%; ▌William F. Switzler (Democratic) 47.92%

== Montana Territory ==
See non-voting delegates, below.

== Nebraska ==
District	Incumbent			This race	
District	Member	Party	First elected	Results	Candidates
Nebraska at-large	John Taffe	Republican	1866	Incumbent re-elected.	▌ ✓ John Taffe (Republican) 58.00%; ▌Andrew Jackson Poppleton (Democratic) 42.00%

== Nevada ==
District	Incumbent			This race	
District	Member	Party	First elected	Results	Candidates
Nevada at-large	Delos R. Ashley	Republican	1865	Incumbent retired. Republican hold.	▌ ✓ Thomas Fitch (Republican) 53.8%; ▌ William F. Anderson (Democratic) 46.2%

== New Hampshire ==
District	Incumbent			This race	
District	Member	Party	First elected	Results	Candidates
New Hampshire 1	Jacob Hart Ela	Republican	1867	Incumbent re-elected.	▌ ✓ Jacob Hart Ela (Republican) 53.6%; ▌ Ellery Albee Hibbard (Democratic) 46.4%
New Hampshire 2	Aaron Fletcher Stevens	Republican	1867	Incumbent re-elected.	▌ ✓ Aaron Fletcher Stevens (Republican) 53.9%; ▌ Edward W. Harrington (Democratic) 46.2%
New Hampshire 3	Jacob Benton	Republican	1867	Incumbent re-elected.	▌ ✓ Jacob Benton (Republican) 51.3%; ▌ Hosea W. Parker (Democratic) 48.7%

== New Jersey ==
District	Incumbent			This race	
District	Member	Party	First elected	Results	Candidates
New Jersey 1	William Moore	Republican	1866	Incumbent re-elected.	▌ ✓ William Moore (Republican) 56.9%; ▌ Samuel J. Bayard (Democratic) 43.1%
New Jersey 2	Charles Haight	Democratic	1866	Incumbent re-elected.	▌ ✓ Charles Haight (Democratic) 51.3%; ▌ James F. Rusling (Republican) 48.7%
New Jersey 3	Charles Sitgreaves	Democratic	1864	Incumbent retired. Democratic hold.	▌ ✓ John T. Bird (Democratic) 55.9%; ▌ Amos Clark Jr. (Republican) 44.1%
New Jersey 4	John Hill	Republican	1866	Incumbent re-elected.	▌ ✓ John Hill (Republican) 50.1%; ▌ Philip Rafferty (Democratic) 49.9%
New Jersey 5	George A. Halsey	Republican	1866	Incumbent lost re-election. Democratic gain.	▌ ✓ Orestes Cleveland (Democratic) 53.1%; ▌ George A. Halsey (Republican) 46.9%

== New Mexico Territory ==
See non-voting delegates, below.

== New York ==
District	Incumbent			This race	
District	Member	Party	First elected	Results	Candidates
New York 1	Stephen Taber	Democratic	1864	Incumbent retired. Democratic hold.	▌ ✓ Henry Augustus Reeves (Democratic) 52.8%; ▌ Alfred M. Wood (Republican) 47.3%
New York 2	Demas Barnes	Democratic	1866	Incumbent retired. Democratic hold.	▌ ✓ John G. Schumaker (Democratic) 66.2%; ▌ Henry S. Bellows (Republican) 33.8%
New York 3	William Erigena Robinson	Democratic	1866	Incumbent retired. Democratic hold.	▌ ✓ Henry Warner Slocum (Democratic) 54.7%; ▌ Samuel Booth (Republican) 45.3%
New York 4	John Fox	Democratic	1866	Incumbent re-elected.	▌ ✓ John Fox (Democratic) 83.3%; ▌ Charles V. Lewis (Republican) 16.7%
New York 5	John Morrissey	Democratic	1866	Incumbent re-elected.	▌ ✓ John Morrissey (Democratic) 69.4%; ▌ James W. McCartin (Republican) 19.4%; ▌ George Francis Train (Ind. Democratic) 11.2%
New York 6	Thomas E. Stewart	Conservative Republican	1866	Incumbent retired. Democratic gain.	▌ ✓ Samuel S. Cox (Democratic) 56.1%; ▌ George Starr (Republican) 43.9%
New York 7	John Winthrop Chanler	Democratic	1862	Incumbent lost renomination. Democratic hold.	▌ ✓ Hervey C. Calkin (Democratic) 75.5%; ▌ Joseph C. Pinckney (Republican) 24.5%
New York 8	James Brooks	Democratic	1866	Incumbent re-elected.	▌ ✓ James Brooks (Democratic) 68.5%; ▌ William Laimbeer Jr. (Republican) 31.5%
New York 9	Fernando Wood	Democratic	1866	Incumbent re-elected.	▌ ✓ Fernando Wood (Democratic) 57.5%; ▌ Francis A. Thomas (Republican) 35.6%; ▌ John Savage (Ind.Democratic) 6.9%
New York 10	William H. Robertson	Republican	1866	Incumbent retired. Democratic gain.	▌ ✓ Clarkson Nott Potter (Democratic) 56.6%; ▌ David O. Bradley (Republican) 43.4%
New York 11	Charles Van Wyck	Republican	1866	Incumbent lost re-election. Democratic gain.	▌ ✓ George Woodward Greene (Democratic) 50.7%; ▌ Charles Van Wyck (Republican) 49.3%
New York 11	Charles Van Wyck	Republican	1866	Election successfully contested. Incumbent seated February 17, 1870.	▌ ✓ Charles Van Wyck (Republican); ▌ George Woodward Greene (Democratic)
New York 12	John H. Ketcham	Republican	1864	Incumbent re-elected.	▌ ✓ John H. Ketcham (Republican) 50.8%; ▌ Charles Wheaton (Democratic) 49.2%
New York 13	Thomas Cornell	Republican	1866	Incumbent lost re-election. Democratic gain.	▌ ✓ John Ashley Griswold (Democratic) 51.1%; ▌ Thomas Cornell (Republican) 48.9%
New York 14	John V. L. Pruyn	Democratic	1866	Incumbent retired. Democratic hold.	▌ ✓ Stephen L. Mayham (Democratic) 54.0%; ▌ Joseph H. Ramsey (Republican) 46.0%
New York 15	John Augustus Griswold	Republican	1862	Incumbent retired. Republican hold.	▌ ✓ Adolphus H. Tanner (Republican) 53.8%; ▌ Jason C. Osgood (Democratic) 46.2%
New York 16	Orange Ferriss	Republican	1866	Incumbent re-elected.	▌ ✓ Orange Ferriss (Republican) 55.9%; ▌ Robert W. Livingston (Democratic) 44.1%
New York 17	Calvin T. Hulburd	Republican	1862	Incumbent retired. Republican hold.	▌ ✓ William A. Wheeler (Republican) 70.8%; ▌ William H. Wallace (Democratic) 29.2%
New York 18	James M. Marvin	Republican	1862	Incumbent retired. Republican hold.	▌ ✓ Stephen Sanford (Republican) 53.4%; ▌ John H. White (Democratic) 46.6%
New York 19	William C. Fields	Republican	1866	Incumbent retired. Republican hold.	▌ ✓ Charles Knapp (Republican) 55.2%; ▌ Francis R. Gilbert (Democratic) 44.8%
New York 20	Addison H. Laflin	Republican	1864	Incumbent re-elected.	▌ ✓ Addison H. Laflin (Republican) 55.5%; ▌ Andrew Cornwall (Democratic) 44.5%
New York 21	Alexander H. Bailey	Republican	1867	Incumbent re-elected.	▌ ✓ Alexander H. Bailey (Republican) 52.7%; ▌ J. Thomas Spriggs (Democratic) 47.3%
New York 22	John C. Churchill	Republican	1866	Incumbent re-elected.	▌ ✓ John C. Churchill (Republican) 71.9%; ▌ Charles Stebbins Jr. (Democratic) 28.1%
New York 23	Dennis McCarthy	Republican	1866	Incumbent re-elected.	▌ ✓ Dennis McCarthy (Republican) 59.0%; ▌ William Porter (Democratic) 41.0%
New York 24	Theodore M. Pomeroy	Republican	1860	Incumbent retired. Republican hold.	▌ ✓ George W. Cowles (Republican) 57.5%; ▌ Elmore P. Ross (Democratic) 42.5%
New York 25	William H. Kelsey	Republican	1866	Incumbent re-elected.	▌ ✓ William H. Kelsey (Republican) 58.3%; ▌ Lester B. Faulkner (Democratic) 41.7%
New York 26	William S. Lincoln	Republican	1866	Incumbent retired. Republican hold.	▌ ✓ Giles W. Hotchkiss (Republican) 58.6%; ▌ Alvin Devereaux (Democratic) 41.4%
New York 27	Hamilton Ward Sr.	Republican	1864	Incumbent re-elected.	▌ ✓ Hamilton Ward Sr. (Republican) 58.6%; ▌ Curtiss C. Gardiner (Democratic) 41.4%
New York 28	Lewis Selye	Republican	1866	Incumbent retired. Republican hold.	▌ ✓ Noah Davis (Republican) 54.8%; ▌ John McConville (Democratic) 45.2%
New York 29	Burt Van Horn	Republican	1864	Incumbent retired. Republican hold.	▌ ✓ John Fisher (Republican) 56.6%; ▌ James Jackson Jr. (Democratic) 43.4%
New York 30	James M. Humphrey	Democratic	1864	Incumbent retired. Republican gain.	▌ ✓ David S. Bennett (Republican) 52.8%; ▌ Isaac A. Verplanck (Democratic) 47.2%
New York 31	Henry Van Aernam	Republican	1864	Incumbent retired. Republican hold.	▌ ✓ Porter Sheldon (Republican) 64.6%; ▌ John S. Beggs (Democratic) 35.4%

== North Carolina ==
1868 elections to finish the term

District	Incumbent			This race	
District	Member	Party	First elected	Results	Candidates
North Carolina 1	None			State readmitted. Republican gain.	▌ ✓ John R. French (Republican) 58.5%; ▌ Henry A. Gilliam (Conservative) 41.5%
North Carolina 2	None			State readmitted. Republican gain.	▌ ✓ David Heaton (Republican) 56.8%; ▌ Thomas Kenan (Conservative) 43.2%
North Carolina 3	None			State readmitted. Republican gain.	▌ ✓ Oliver H. Dockery (Republican) 56.9%; ▌ Thomas Charles Fuller (Conservative) 43.1%
North Carolina 4	None			State readmitted. Republican gain.	▌ ✓ John T. Deweese (Republican) 55.4%; ▌ Samuel T. Williams (Conservative) 44.6%
North Carolina 5	None			State readmitted. Republican gain.	▌ ✓ Israel G. Lash (Republican) 58.7%; ▌ David F. Caldwell (Conservative) 41.2%
North Carolina 6	None			State readmitted. Conservative gain.	▌ ✓ Nathaniel Boyden (Conservative) 52.8%; ▌ Calvin J. Cowles (Republican) 47.2%
North Carolina 7	None			State readmitted. Republican gain.	▌ ✓ Alexander H. Jones (Republican) 54.2%; ▌ Burgess Sidney Gaither (Conservative) 45.7%

1868 Elections to new term

District	Incumbent			This race	
District	Member	Party	First elected	Results	Candidates
North Carolina 1	John R. French	Republican	1868	Incumbent lost renomination. Republican hold.	▌ ✓ Clinton L. Cobb (Republican) 56.5%; ▌ David A. Barnes (Conservative) 43.5%
North Carolina 2	David Heaton	Republican	1868	Incumbent re-elected.	▌ ✓ David Heaton (Republican) 54.8%; ▌ Thomas Kenan (Conservative) 45.2%
North Carolina 3	Oliver H. Dockery	Republican	1868	Incumbent re-elected.	▌ ✓ Oliver H. Dockery (Republican) 53.4%; ▌ Almand A. McKoy (Conservative) 46.6%
North Carolina 4	John T. Deweese	Republican	1868	Incumbent re-elected.	▌ ✓ John T. Deweese (Republican) 52.2%; ▌ Sion H. Rogers (Conservative) 47.8%
North Carolina 5	Israel G. Lash	Republican	1868	Incumbent re-elected.	▌ ✓ Israel G. Lash (Republican) 56.6%; ▌ Livingston Brown (Conservative) 43.4%
North Carolina 6	Nathaniel Boyden	Conservative	1868	Incumbent lost re-election as a Republican candidate. Conservative hold.	▌ ✓ Francis Edwin Shober (Conservative) 52.3%; ▌ Nathaniel Boyden (Republican) 47.7%
North Carolina 7	Alexander H. Jones	Republican	1868	Incumbent re-elected.	▌ ✓ Alexander H. Jones (Republican) 50.0%; ▌ Plato Durham (Conservative) 50.0%

== Ohio ==
District	Incumbent			This race	
District	Representative	Party	First elected	Results	Candidates
Ohio 1	Benjamin Eggleston	Republican	1864	Incumbent lost re-election. Democratic gain.	▌ ✓ Peter W. Strader (Democratic) 50.5%; ▌Benjamin Eggleston (Republican) 49.5%
Ohio 2	Samuel F. Cary	Ind-Republican	1867 (special)	Incumbent lost re-election. Republican hold.	▌ ✓ Job E. Stevenson (Republican) 51.1%; ▌Samuel F. Cary (Democratic) 48.9%
Ohio 3	Robert C. Schenck	Republican	1862	Incumbent re-elected.	▌ ✓ Robert C. Schenck (Republican) 50.7%; ▌Clement Vallandigham (Democratic) 49.3%
Ohio 4	William Lawrence	Republican	1864	Incumbent re-elected.	▌ ✓ William Lawrence (Republican) 51.2%; ▌John S. Leedom (Democratic) 48.8%
Ohio 5	William Mungen	Democratic	1866	Incumbent re-elected.	▌ ✓ William Mungen (Democratic) 59.3%; ▌Thomas E. Grissell (Republican) 40.7%
Ohio 6	Reader W. Clarke	Republican	1864	Incumbent retired. Republican hold.	▌ ✓ John Armstrong Smith (Republican) 51.6%; ▌Nelson Barrere (Democratic) 48.4%
Ohio 7	Samuel Shellabarger	Republican	1864	Incumbent retired. Republican hold.	▌ ✓ James J. Winans (Republican) 50.2%; ▌John H. Thomas (Democratic) 49.8%
Ohio 8	John Beatty	Republican	1868 (special)	Incumbent re-elected.	▌ ✓ John Beatty (Republican) 52.0%; ▌John H. Benson (Democratic) 48.0%
Ohio 9	Ralph P. Buckland	Republican	1864	Incumbent retired. Democratic gain.	▌ ✓ Edward F. Dickinson (Democratic) 52.7%; ▌William Harvey Gibson (Republican) 47.3%
Ohio 10	James M. Ashley	Republican	1862	Incumbent lost re-election. Democratic gain.	▌ ✓ Truman H. Hoag (Democratic) 51.5%; ▌James M. Ashley (Republican) 48.5%
Ohio 11	John Thomas Wilson	Republican	1866	Incumbent re-elected.	▌ ✓ John Thomas Wilson (Republican) 54.2%; ▌John Sands (Democratic) 45.8%
Ohio 12	Philadelph Van Trump	Democratic	1866	Incumbent re-elected.	▌ ✓ Philadelph Van Trump (Democratic) 58.9%; ▌Nelson J. Turney (Republican) 41.1%
Ohio 13	Columbus Delano	Republican	1866 (Note: Columbus Delano lost election in 1866 to George W. Morgan, contested the election and was seated June 1868.)	Incumbent retired. Democratic gain.	▌ ✓ George W. Morgan (Democratic) 53.0%; ▌Charles Cooper (Republican) 47.0%
Ohio 14	Martin Welker	Republican	1864	Incumbent re-elected.	▌ ✓ Martin Welker (Republican) 50.9%; ▌Lyman R. Critchfield (Democratic) 49.1%
Ohio 15	Tobias A. Plants	Republican	1864	Incumbent retired. Republican hold.	▌ ✓ Eliakim H. Moore (Republican) 51.8%; ▌Martin Dewey Follett (Democratic) 48.2%
Ohio 16	John Bingham	Republican	1864	Incumbent re-elected.	▌ ✓ John Bingham (Republican) 50.8%; ▌Josiah M. Estep (Democratic) 49.2%
Ohio 17	Ephraim R. Eckley	Republican	1862	Incumbent retired. Republican hold.	▌ ✓ Jacob A. Ambler (Republican) 56.4%; ▌Daniel T. Lawson (Democratic) 43.6%
Ohio 18	Rufus P. Spalding	Republican	1862	Incumbent retired. Republican hold.	▌ ✓ William H. Upson (Republican) 60.5%; ▌Franklin T. Backus (Democratic) 39.5%
Ohio 19	James A. Garfield	Republican	1862	Incumbent re-elected.	▌ ✓ James A. Garfield (Republican) 67.4%; ▌James McEwen (Democratic) 32.6%

== Oregon ==
District	Incumbent			This race	
District	Member	Party	First elected	Results	Candidates
Oregon at-large	Rufus Mallory	Republican	1866	Incumbent retired. Democratic gain.	▌ ✓ Joseph Showalter Smith (Democratic) 52.7%; ▌ David Logan (Republican) 47.3%

== Pennsylvania ==
District	Incumbent			This race	
District	Member	Party	First elected	Results	Candidates
Pennsylvania 1	Samuel J. Randall	Democratic	1862	Incumbent re-elected.	▌ ✓ Samuel J. Randall (Democratic) 63.7%; ▌ Benjamin L. Berry (Republican) 36.3%
Pennsylvania 2	Charles O'Neill	Republican	1862	Incumbent re-elected.	▌ ✓ Charles O'Neill (Republican) 55.0%; ▌ Thomas B. Florence (Democratic) 45.1%
Pennsylvania 3	Leonard Myers	Republican	1862	Incumbent lost re-election. Democratic gain.	▌ ✓ John Moffet (Democratic) 50.2%; ▌ Leonard Myers (Republican) 49.8%
Pennsylvania 3	Leonard Myers	Republican	1862	Election successfully contested. Incumbent seated April 9, 1869.	▌ ✓ Leonard Myers (Republican); ▌ John Moffet (Democratic)
Pennsylvania 4	William D. Kelley	Republican	1860	Incumbent re-elected.	▌ ✓ William D. Kelley (Republican) 52.9%; ▌ James B. Nicholson (Democratic) 47.1%
Pennsylvania 5	Caleb N. Taylor	Republican	1866	Incumbent lost re-election. Democratic gain.	▌ ✓ John Roberts Reading (Democratic) 50.1%; ▌ Caleb N. Taylor (Republican) 49.9%
Pennsylvania 5	Caleb N. Taylor	Republican	1866	Election successfully contested. Incumbent seated April 13, 1870.	▌ ✓ Caleb N. Taylor (Republican); ▌ John Roberts Reading (Democratic)
Pennsylvania 6	Benjamin Markley Boyer	Democratic	1864	Incumbent retired. Democratic hold.	▌ ✓ John D. Stiles (Democratic) 54.8%; ▌ John R. Breitenbach (Republican) 45.2%
Pennsylvania 7	John M. Broomall	Republican	1862	Incumbent retired. Republican hold.	▌ ✓ Washington Townsend (Republican) 57.4%; ▌ Robert E. Monaghan (Democratic) 42.6%
Pennsylvania 8	James Lawrence Getz	Democratic	1866	Incumbent re-elected.	▌ ✓ James Lawrence Getz (Democratic) 64.8%; ▌ Henry S. Eckert (Republican) 35.2%
Pennsylvania 9	Thaddeus Stevens	Republican	1858	Incumbent died. Winner also elected to finish term. Republican hold.	▌ ✓ Oliver James Dickey (Republican) 63.4%; ▌ Hiram B. Swarr (Democratic) 36.7%
Pennsylvania 10	Henry L. Cake	Republican	1866	Incumbent re-elected.	▌ ✓ Henry L. Cake (Republican) 50.5%; ▌ James J. Conner (Democratic) 49.6%
Pennsylvania 11	Daniel Myers Van Auken	Democratic	1867	Incumbent re-elected.	▌ ✓ Daniel Myers Van Auken (Democratic) 63.4%; ▌ John Torrey (Republican) 36.6%
Pennsylvania 12	George Washington Woodward	Democratic	1867	Incumbent re-elected.	▌ ✓ George Washington Woodward (Democratic) 52.8%; ▌ Theodore Strong (Republican) 47.2%
Pennsylvania 13	Ulysses Mercur	Republican	1864	Incumbent re-elected.	▌ ✓ Ulysses Mercur (Republican) 50.6%; ▌ Victor E. Piolett (Democratic) 49.4%
Pennsylvania 14	George Funston Miller	Republican	1864	Incumbent retired. Republican hold.	▌ ✓ John B. Packer (Republican) 54.7%; ▌ Joseph F. Knipe (Democratic) 45.3%
Pennsylvania 15	Adam John Glossbrenner	Democratic	1864	Incumbent lost renomination. Democratic hold.	▌ ✓ Richard Jacobs Haldeman (Democratic) 55.8%; ▌ Samuel Small (Republican) 44.2%
Pennsylvania 16	William H. Koontz	Republican	1864	Incumbent retired. Republican hold.	▌ ✓ John Cessna (Republican) 50.3%; ▌ Fran M. Kimmell (Democratic) 49.7%
Pennsylvania 17	Daniel J. Morrell	Republican	1866	Incumbent re-elected.	▌ ✓ Daniel J. Morrell (Republican) 52.4%; ▌ John P. Linton (Democratic) 47.6%
Pennsylvania 18	Stephen F. Wilson	Republican	1864	Incumbent resigned. Republican hold.	▌ ✓ William Hepburn Armstrong (Republican) 53.2%; ▌ Levi A. Mackey (Democratic) 46.8%
Pennsylvania 19	Glenni W. Scofield	Republican	1862	Incumbent re-elected.	▌ ✓ Glenni W. Scofield (Republican) 54.1%; ▌ Rasselas Brown (Democratic) 45.9%
Pennsylvania 20	Darwin A. Finney	Republican	1866	Incumbent died. Republican hold.	▌ ✓ Calvin Willard Gilfillan (Republican) 52.6%; ▌ Robert M. DeFrance (Democratic) 47.4%
Pennsylvania 21	John Covode	Republican	1866	Governor refused to certify the election of either candidate. Seat declared vacant.	▌ Henry Donnel Foster (Democratic) 50.1%; ▌ John Covode (Republican) 49.9%
Pennsylvania 21	John Covode	Republican	1866	Election successfully contested. Incumbent seated February 9, 1870.	▌ ✓ John Covode (Republican); ▌ Henry Donnel Foster (Democratic)
Pennsylvania 22	James K. Moorhead	Republican	1858	Incumbent retired. Republican hold.	▌ ✓ James S. Negley (Republican) 58.7%; ▌ Andrew Burt (Democratic) 41.3%
Pennsylvania 23	Thomas Williams	Republican	1862	Incumbent retired. Republican hold.	▌ ✓ Darwin Phelps (Republican) 59.3%; ▌ Lewis Z. Mitchell (Democratic) 40.7%
Pennsylvania 24	George V. Lawrence	Republican	1864	Incumbent retired. Republican hold.	▌ ✓ Joseph Benton Donley (Republican) 52.1%; ▌ David Crawford (Democratic) 47.9%

== Rhode Island ==
District	Incumbent			This race	
District	Member	Party	First elected	Results	Candidates
Rhode Island 1	Thomas Jenckes	Republican	1863	Incumbent re-elected.	▌ ✓ Thomas Jenckes (Republican) 66.4%; ▌ [FNU] Arnold (Democratic) 33.1%
Rhode Island 2	Nathan F. Dixon II	Republican	1863	Incumbent re-elected.	▌ ✓ Nathan F. Dixon II (Republican) 60.9%; ▌ [FNU] Waterhouse (Democratic) 38.9%

== South Carolina ==
1868 Elections to finish term

District	Incumbent			This race	
District	Member	Party	First elected	Results	Candidates
South Carolina 1	None			State readmitted. Republican gain.	▌ ✓ Benjamin Franklin Whittemore (Republican) 74.2%; ▌ J. N. Frierson (Democratic) 25.8%
South Carolina 2	None			State readmitted. Republican gain.	▌ ✓ Christopher C. Bowen (Republican) 77.2%; ▌ William H. Brisbane (Republican) 22.8%
South Carolina 3	None			State readmitted. Republican gain.	▌ ✓ Manuel S. Corley (Republican) 71.0%; ▌ Samuel McGowan (Democratic) 29.0%
South Carolina 4	None			State readmitted. Republican gain.	▌ ✓ James H. Goss (Republican) 57.2%; ▌ S. McAllilly (Democratic) 42.8%

1868 Elections to new term

(Initial results annulled in 3rd and 4th Districts)

District	Incumbent			This race	
District	Member	Party	First elected	Results	Candidates
South Carolina 1	Benjamin Franklin Whittemore	Republican	1868	Incumbent re-elected.	▌ ✓ Benjamin Franklin Whittemore (Republican) 61.3%; ▌ H. J. Covington (Democratic) 38.7%
South Carolina 2	Christopher C. Bowen	Republican	1868	Incumbent re-elected.	▌ ✓ Christopher C. Bowen (Republican) 75.7%; ▌ R. W. Seymour (Democratic) 24.3%
South Carolina 3	Manuel S. Corley	Republican	1868	Incumbent retired. Election annulled and Republican candidate seated. Republican hold.	▌ J. P. Reed (Democratic) 57.3%; ▌ ✓ Solomon L. Hoge (Republican) 42.7%; Initial result annulled
South Carolina 4	James H. Goss	Republican	1868	Incumbent retired. Election annulled and Republican candidate seated. Republican hold.	▌ William Dunlap Simpson (Democratic) 59.0%; ▌ ✓ Alexander S. Wallace (Republican) 41.0%; Initial result annulled

== Tennessee ==
District	Incumbent			This race	
District	Member	Party	First elected	Results	Candidates
Tennessee 1	Roderick R. Butler	Republican	1867	Incumbent re-elected.	▌ ✓ Roderick R. Butler (Republican) 98.50%; Scattering 1.50%
Tennessee 2	Horace Maynard	Republican	1865	Incumbent re-elected.	▌ ✓ Horace Maynard (Republican) 79.51%; ▌Leonidas C. Houk (Democratic) 20.49%
Tennessee 3	William B. Stokes	Republican	1865	Incumbent re-elected.	▌ ✓ William B. Stokes (Republican) 74.38%; ▌Abraham E. Garrett (Democratic) 25.62%
Tennessee 4	James Mullins	Republican	1867	Incumbent retired. Republican hold.	▌ ✓ Lewis Tillman (Republican) 53.02%; ▌C. A. Sheafe (Democratic) 46.98%
Tennessee 5	John Trimble	Republican	1867	Incumbent retired. Republican hold.	▌ ✓ William F. Prosser (Republican) 56.05%; ▌Joseph Motley (Democratic) 25.64%; ▌Samuel C. Mercer (Independent) 17.55%; ▌G. M. Garrett (Unknown) 0.77%
Tennessee 6	Samuel M. Arnell	Republican	1865	Incumbent re-elected.	▌ ✓ Samuel M. Arnell (Republican) 69.81%; ▌John J. Buck (Ind. Republican) 29.06%; ▌Dorsey B. Thomas (Democratic) 1.13%
Tennessee 7	Isaac R. Hawkins	Republican	1865	Incumbent re-elected.	▌ ✓ Isaac R. Hawkins (Republican) 71.32%; ▌George R. Foote (Democratic) 28.68%
Tennessee 8	David A. Nunn	Republican	1867	Incumbent lost re-election as an Independent Republican. Republican hold.	▌ ✓ William J. Smith (Republican) 45.27%; ▌John W. Leftwich (Democratic) 34.26%; ▌David A. Nunn (Ind. Republican) 20.47%

== Texas ==
District	Incumbent			This race	
District	Member	Party	First elected	Results	Candidates
Texas 1	None			State readmitted. Republican gain.	▌ ✓ George W. Whitmore (Republican) 52.0%; ▌ James Armstrong (Democratic) 45.6%; ▌ Horace Boughton (Democratic) 2.3%
Texas 2	None			State readmitted. Democratic gain.	▌ ✓ John C. Conner (Democratic) 41.9%; ▌ B. F. Grafton (Republican) 28.6%; ▌ J. F. Johnson (Ind. Democratic) 23.2%; ▌ R. H. Taylor (Ind. Republican) 6.2%
Texas 3	None			State readmitted. Republican gain.	▌ ✓ William Thomas Clark (Republican) 65.9%; ▌ Jacob Elliot (Democratic) 34.0%
Texas 4	None			State readmitted. Republican gain.	▌ ✓ Edward Degener (Republican) 47.7%; ▌ John L. Haynes (Ind. Republican) 47.3%; ▌ William Mitchell Varnell (Independent) 4.9%

== Utah Territory ==
See non-voting delegates, below.

== Vermont ==
District	Incumbent			This race	
District	Member	Party	First elected	Results	Candidates
Vermont 1	Frederick E. Woodbridge	Republican	1863	Incumbent retired. Republican hold.	▌ ✓ Charles W. Willard (Republican) 75.9%; ▌John Cain (Democratic) 23.9%
Vermont 2	Luke P. Poland	Republican	1866	Incumbent re-elected	▌ ✓ Luke P. Poland (Republican) 73.7%; ▌Charles M. Chase (Democratic) 26.1%
Vermont 3	Worthington C. Smith	Republican	1866	Incumbent re-elected.	▌ ✓ Worthington C. Smith (Republican) 72.1%; ▌Waldo Brigham (Democratic) 27.8%

== Virginia ==
District	Incumbent			This race	
District	Member	Party	First elected	Results	Candidates
Virginia 1	None			State readmitted. Radical gain.	▌ ✓ Richard S. Ayer (Radical) 29.7%; ▌Joseph Segar (Conservative) 27.3%; ▌Daniel M. Norton (Radical) 24.2%; ▌George W. Lewis (Conservative) 18.7%
Virginia 2	None			State readmitted. Radical gain.	▌ ✓ James H. Platt Jr. (Radical) 53.4%; ▌D. J. Godwin (Conservative) 35.8%; ▌Thomas Bayne (Radical) 8.7%
Virginia 3	None			State readmitted. Radical gain.	▌ ✓ Charles H. Porter (Radical) 55.0%; ▌James W. Hunnicutt (Conservative) 41.6%; ▌John E. Mulford (Independent) 2.8%
Virginia 4	None			State readmitted. Conservative gain.	▌ ✓ George Booker (Conservative) 48.0%; ▌George Tucker (Radical) 35.0%; ▌William H. H. Stowell (Radical) 17.0%
Virginia 5	None			State readmitted. Conservative gain.	▌ ✓ Robert Ridgway (Conservative) 55.2%; ▌Gaston G. Curtis (Radical) 44.8%
Virginia 6	None			State readmitted. Conservative gain.	▌ ✓ William Milnes Jr. (Conservative) 56.8%; ▌John T. Harris (Conservative) 31.9%; ▌[FNU] Phelps (Radical) 11.4%
Virginia 7	None			State readmitted. Conservative gain.	▌ ✓ Lewis McKenzie (Conservative) 58.9%; ▌Charles Whittlesey (Radical) 41.1%
Virginia 8	None			State readmitted. Conservative gain.	▌ ✓ James K. Gibson (Conservative) 69.6%; ▌G. S. Smith (Radical) 29.5%

== Washington Territory ==
See non-voting delegates, below.

== West Virginia ==
District	Incumbent			This race	
District	Member	Party	First elected	Results	Candidates
West Virginia 1	Chester D. Hubbard	Republican	1864	Incumbent lost renomination. Republican hold.	▌ ✓ Isaac H. Duval (Republican) 51.88%; ▌H. S. Walker (Democratic) 48.12%
West Virginia 2	Bethuel Kitchen	Republican	1866	Incumbent retired. Republican hold.	▌ ✓ James McGrew (Republican) 58.40%; ▌William G. Brown Sr. (Democratic) 41.61%
West Virginia 3	Daniel Polsley	Republican	1866	Incumbent retired. Republican hold.	▌ ✓ John Witcher (Republican) 56.39%; ▌Charles P. Moore (Democratic) 43.61%

== Wisconsin ==
Wisconsin elected six members of congress on Election Day, November 3, 1868.

District	Incumbent			This race	
District	Member	Party	First elected	Results	Candidates
Wisconsin 1	Halbert E. Paine	Republican	1864	Incumbent re-elected.	▌ ✓ Halbert E. Paine (Republican) 50.6%; ▌Alexander Mitchell (Democratic) 49.4%
Wisconsin 2	Benjamin F. Hopkins	Republican	1866	Incumbent re-elected.	▌ ✓ Benjamin F. Hopkins (Republican) 59.2%; ▌John Winans (Democratic) 40.8%
Wisconsin 3	Amasa Cobb	Republican	1862	Incumbent re-elected.	▌ ✓ Amasa Cobb (Republican) 61.6%; ▌John H. Passmore (Democratic) 38.4%
Wisconsin 4	Charles A. Eldredge	Democratic	1862	Incumbent re-elected.	▌ ✓ Charles A. Eldredge (Democratic) 57.3%; ▌Leander F. Frisby (Republican) 42.7%
Wisconsin 5	Philetus Sawyer	Republican	1864	Incumbent re-elected.	▌ ✓ Philetus Sawyer (Republican) 55.8%; ▌Joseph Vilas (Democratic) 44.2%
Wisconsin 6	Cadwallader C. Washburn	Republican	1866	Incumbent re-elected.	▌ ✓ Cadwallader C. Washburn (Republican) 64.8%; ▌Albert Gallatin Ellis (Democratic) 35.2%

== Non-voting delegates ==
=== Colorado Territory ===
District	Incumbent			This race	
District	Delegate	Party	First elected	Results	Candidates
Colorado Territory at-large	George M. Chilcott	Independent; Republican	1866	Unknown if incumbent retired or lost renomination. Republican gain.	▌ ✓ Allen A. Bradford (Republican); [data missing]

=== Montana Territory ===
The election date is speculative.

District	Incumbent			This race	
District	Delegate	Party	First elected	Results	Candidates
Montana Territory at-large	James M. Cavanaugh	Democratic	1868	Incumbent re-elected.	▌ ✓ James M. Cavanaugh (Democratic) 59.95%; ▌James Tufts (Republican) 40.05%

=== Idaho Territory ===
District	Incumbent			This race	
District	Delegate	Party	First elected	Results	Candidates
Idaho Territory at-large	Edward D. Holbrook	Democratic	1864	Incumbent retired. New delegate elected August 10, 1868. Democratic hold.	▌ ✓ Jacob K. Shafer (Democratic) 57.63%; ▌T. J. Butler (Republican) 41.19%; ▌J. J. May (Independent) 1.17%

=== Wyoming Territory ===
On July 25, 1868, an act of Congress gave Wyoming Territory the authority to elect a congressional delegate, although the first delegate did not take his seat until 1869.

District	Incumbent			This race	
District	Delegate	Party	First elected	Results	Candidates
Wyoming Territory At-large	None, new district.			Territory organized in previous congress. New delegate elected December 6, 1869. Democratic gain.	▌ ✓ Stephen F. Nuckolls (Democratic) 62.69%; ▌William W. Corlett (Republican) 37.32%

== See also ==
- 1868 United States elections
  - 1868 United States presidential election
  - 1868–69 United States Senate elections
- 40th United States Congress
- 41st United States Congress

== Bibliography ==
- Ben. Perley Poore (1869). "Massachusetts". Congressional Directory for the First Session of the Forty-First Congress (2nd ed.). Washington DC: Government Printing Office. hdl:2027/nyp.33433081796686.
- Dubin, Michael J. (March 1, 1998). United States Congressional Elections, 1788-1997: The Official Results of the Elections of the 1st Through 105th Congresses. McFarland and Company. ISBN 978-0786402830.
- Martis, Kenneth C. (January 1, 1989). The Historical Atlas of Political Parties in the United States Congress, 1789-1989. Macmillan Publishing Company. ISBN 978-0029201701.
- Moore, John L., ed. (1994). Congressional Quarterly's Guide to U.S. Elections (Third ed.). Congressional Quarterly Inc. ISBN 978-0871879967.
- Parrish, William E. (1973). A History of Missouri, Volume 3: 1860 to 1875. Columbia: University of Missouri Press. ISBN 978-0-8262-0108-9.
- "Party Divisions of the House of Representatives* 1789–Present". Office of the Historian, House of United States House of Representatives.
