= Theodore Gass =

Florida state legislator

Theodore C. Gass was a politician in Florida. He served as a county commissioner in Alachua County and in the Florida House of Representatives from 1871 to 1875. He also served as a councilman in Gainesville from 187 until 1879 and again from 1881 until 1885.

He was born 1833 or 1836/7 in South Carolina.

In 1871 and 1872 he represented Alachua County along with William K. Cessna in the Florida House of Representatives. In 1873, 1874 and 1875 he represented Alachua County along with George Washington.

== See also ==
- African American officeholders from the end of the Civil War until before 1900
