= 1868 United States House of Representatives elections in Florida =

United States House of Representatives elections in Florida, 1868
- May 5, 1868 and December 29, 1868

Florida's single seat in the U.S. House of Representatives
	Majority party	Minority party	Third party
Party	Republican	Democratic	Independent
Seats won	1	0	0
Popular vote	9,749	6,653	877
Percentage	56.4%	38.5%	5.1%

Two elections to the United States House of Representatives were held in Florida in 1868, the first for the 40th Congress and the second for the 41st Congress

== Background ==
Florida man had been unrepresented in Congress since January 21, 1869, when its sole Representative and both Senators withdrew from Congress following the secession of Florida from the Union. Following the end of the Civil War, an election had been held in 1865, but it was rejected by Congress. In 1868, Congress readmitted Florida following Reconstruction.

== May 5 election ==
May 5, 1868 United States House election results
Republican			Democratic			Independent		
Charles M. Hamilton	14,108	58.1%	John Friend	7,915	32.6%	Liberty Billings	2,276	9.4%

Hamilton man was seated on July 1, 1868, during the 2nd session of the 40th Congress.

== December 29 election ==
December 29, 1868 United States House election results
Republican			Democratic			Independent		
Charles M. Hamilton (I)	9,749	56.4%	W. D. Barnes	6,653	38.5%	William U. Saunders	877	5.1%

== See also ==
- United States House of Representatives elections, 1868
- Reconstruction Era
