= 1865 United States House of Representatives election in Florida =

United States House of Representatives election in Florida, 1865
- November 29, 1865

Florida's single seat to the United States House of Representatives
Last election	0
Seats won	0
Seat change	Steady
Popular vote	5,050

An election to the United States House of Representatives was held in Florida for the 39th Congress on November 29, 1865, shortly after the end of the Civil War.

== Background ==
On January 21, 1861, Florida's Senate and House seats became vacant when the State seceded from the Union, subsequently joining the Confederate States of America. Florida was represented in the Confederate Congress by two Senators and two Representatives. The Civil War ended in April 1865 and Florida held its first post-War election November 29.

== Election results ==
The party affiliations of these candidates are unknown.

1865 United States House election results
Ferdinand McLeod	2,192	43.4%
D. P. Hogue	1,483	29.4%
J. W. Culpepper	518	10.3%
W. M. Ives	238	4.7%
W. H. Anson	147	2.9%
J. F. Johnston	141	2.8%
John W. Price	102	2.0%
Scattering	229	4.5%

== Post-election ==
Along with the other former Confederate States, Florida was not permitted to be represented in Congress until after Reconstruction. Florida was readmitted in 1868, and held its first post-Reconstruction election on May 5, 1868, representation resuming on July 1, 1868, after nearly 7 1/2 years' absence from Congress.

== See also ==
- United States House of Representatives elections, 1864
- Fourteenth session of the Florida House of Representatives
- 1865 Florida gubernatorial election
- American Civil War
- Reconstruction Era
