= Leonard Myers (politician) =

American politician

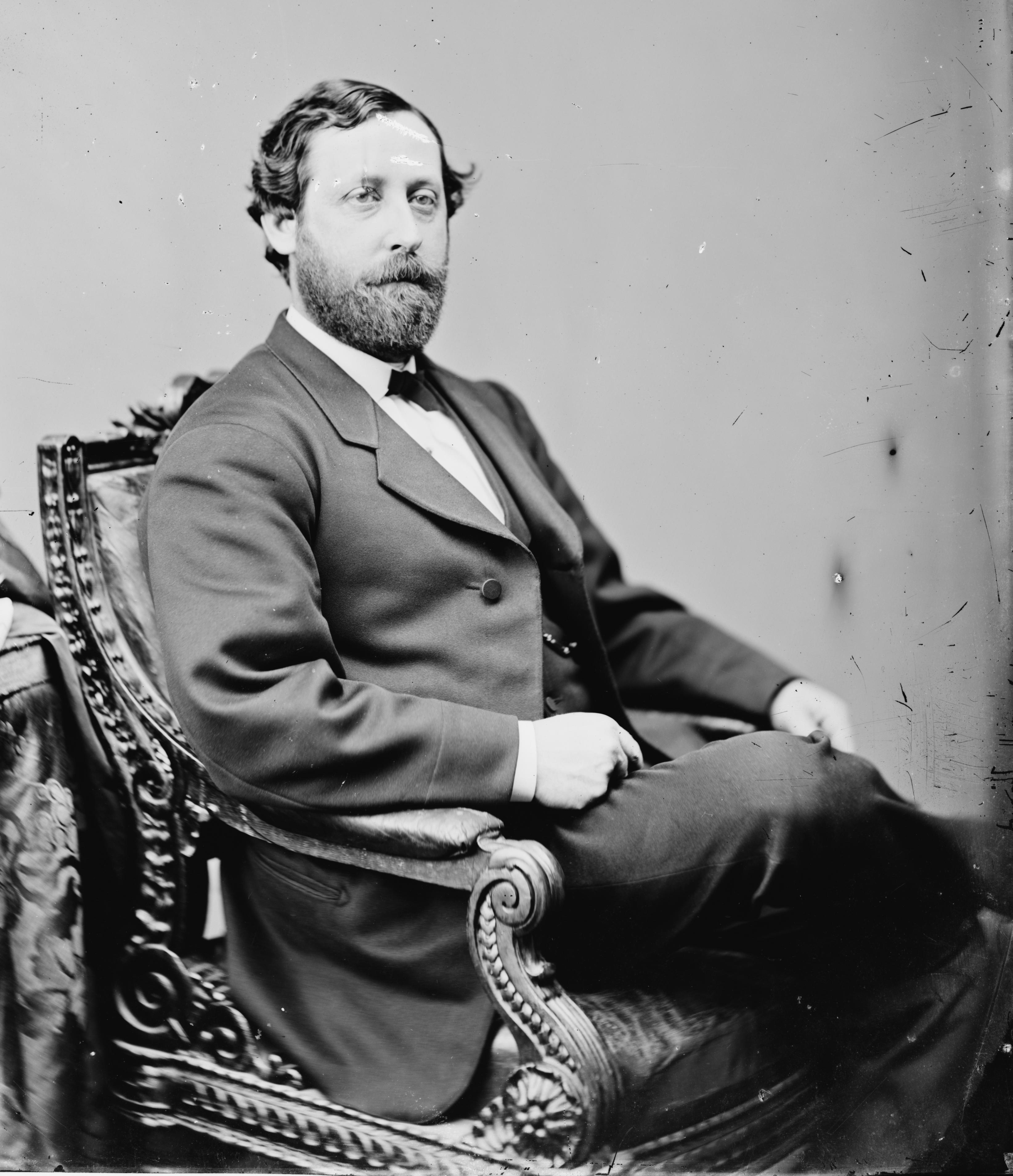
Leonard Myers

Leonard Myers (November 13, 1827 – February 11, 1905) was a Republican member of the U.S. House of Representatives from Pennsylvania during the American Civil War and the early years of Reconstruction.

== Biography ==
Leonard Myers was born in Attleboro, Pennsylvania (now Langhorne, Pennsylvania). He attended the University of Pennsylvania at Philadelphia and studied law, but did not earn a degree.

He was major of the Ninth Regiment, Pennsylvania Militia, during the emergency service of September 1862 when Pennsylvania felt threatened by Robert E. Lee during the Maryland Campaign.

He was elected to Congress as a Republican in 1862. He successfully contested the election of John Moffet to the 41st Congress. He was reelected in 1868 and served until March 3, 1875. He served as Chairman of the United States House Committee on Foreign Affairs (42nd United States Congress), United States House Committee on Patents (42nd Congress), and United States House Committee on Private Land Claims (43rd United States Congress). He was defeated in 1874.

U.S. House of Representatives
Preceded by John P. Verree	Member of the U.S. House of Representatives from Pennsylvania's 3rd congressional district March 4, 1863 –March 3, 1869	Succeeded by John Moffet
Preceded by John Moffet	Member of the U.S. House of Representatives from Pennsylvania's 3rd congressional district April 9, 1869 – March 3, 1875	Succeeded by Samuel J. Randall
