= William Morris Davis (politician) =

American politician

Member of the U.S. House of Representatives from Pennsylvania's 5th district
- In office March 4, 1861 – March 3, 1863
- Preceded by: John Wood
- Succeeded by: Martin Russell Thayer

Personal details
- Born: August 16, 1815 Keene, New York
- Died: August 5, 1891 (aged 75) Keene, New York
- Party: Republican

William Morris Davis (August 16, 1815 – August 5, 1891), was an abolitionist, author and a Republican member of the U.S. House of Representatives from Pennsylvania. Among his friends were the New York sculptor Henry Kirke Brown, and the lock inventor Linus Yale.

== Biography ==
William Morris Davis was born in Keene, New York. He moved to Pennsylvania and became a sugar refiner in Philadelphia. Davis was elected as a Republican to the Thirty-seventh Congress. He was elected as a member to the American Philosophical Society in 1883.

He died in Keene Valley in 1891. Interment in Friends Fair Hill Burial Ground in Germantown, Philadelphia.

His extended family included Reverend Phebe Ann Coffin Hanaford, Abby Hopper Gibbons, Martha Coffin Wright, John Pelham and Edward Morris Davis.

== Works ==
- Nimrod of the Sea or The American Whaleman - AOSTON (Harper & Bros., New York 1874)

== Sources ==
- United States Congress. "William Morris Davis (id: D000143)". Biographical Directory of the United States Congress.
- The Political Graveyard

== Bibliography ==
- William Morris Davis (1815–1891): the story of a nineteenth century American - Arthur M. Johnson (Washington DC, 1951)

U.S. House of Representatives
Preceded by John Wood	Member of the U.S. House of Representatives from Pennsylvania's 5th congressional district 1861–1863	Succeeded by Martin R. Thayer
