= Martin Russell Thayer =

American politician (1819–1906)

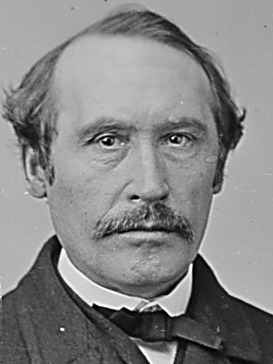

Member of the United States House of Representatives from Pennsylvania's 5th congressional district
- In office March 4, 1863 – March 4, 1867
- Preceded by: William Morris Davis
- Succeeded by: Caleb Newbold Taylor

Personal details
- Born: Martin Russell Thayer; January 27, 1819 Dinwiddie County, Virginia
- Died: October 14, 1906 (aged 87) Philadelphia, Pennsylvania
- Resting place: Church of St. James the Less
- Party: Republican
- Occupation: Attorney, Politician

Martin Russell Thayer (January 27, 1819 – October 14, 1906) was an American lawyer and politician who served two terms as a Republican member of the U.S. House of Representatives from the U.S. commonwealth of Pennsylvania from 1863 to 1867.

His grandnephew was John B. Thayer, who died on the sinking of the RMS Titanic.

== Early life ==
Martin Russell Thayer was born in Dinwiddie County, Virginia near the city limits of Petersburg. He attended the Mount Pleasant Classical Institute in Amherst, Massachusetts and Amherst College. He moved with his father to Philadelphia in 1837. He graduated from the University of Pennsylvania in 1840. He studied law, was admitted to the bar in 1842, and commenced practice in Philadelphia.

== Public service ==
Thayer was a commissioner to revise the revenue laws of Pennsylvania in 1862.

=== Congress ===
He was elected as a Republican to the Thirty-eighth and Thirty-ninth Congresses, during which he served on the committee on the bankrupt law and was the chairman of the United States House Committee on Private Land Claims. He declined to be a candidate for re-election in 1866, and resumed the practice of law.

While in Congress, Thayer criticized the use of portraits of living persons on US currency, suggesting that the Treasury's privilege of portrait selection for currency was being abused. (Note: "But now we see upon our current paper money not only the heads of the illustrious men of our country long since gathered to their fathers, but of living secretaries of the Treasury, and even of such subordinate officers as the superintendent of the Currency Printing Bureau, Mr. S.M. Clark.") Spearheaded by Thayer, on April 7, 1866, Congress enacted legislation specifically stating "that no portrait or likeness of any living person hereafter engraved, shall be placed upon any of the bonds, securities, notes, fractional or postal currency of the United States."

=== Later career ===
Thayer was judge of the district court of Philadelphia from 1867 to 1874, and served as president judge of the court of common pleas of Philadelphia from 1874 until his resignation in 1896. In 1873 he was appointed on the board of visitors to West Point, and wrote the report. (Some 40 years earlier, his cousin Sylvanus Thayer had been superintendent of West Point.) He was elected as a member to the American Philosophical Society in 1877. He was elected by the judges of the common pleas court prothonotary of Philadelphia in 1896. He also engaged in literary pursuits.

== Death and burial ==
He died in Philadelphia in 1906 and is buried in the churchyard of Church of St. James the Less in Philadelphia.

== Works ==
- The Duties of Citizenship (Philadelphia, 1862)
- A Reply to Mr. Charles Ingersoll's "Letter to a Friend in a Slave State." (Philadelphia, 1862)
- The Great Victory: its Cost and Value (1865)
- The Law considered as a Progressive Science (1870)
- On Libraries (1871)
- The Life and Works of Francis Lieber (1873)
- The Battle of Germantown (1878)

== Notes ==
U.S. House of Representatives
Preceded by William M. Davis	Member of the U.S. House of Representatives from Pennsylvania's 5th congressional district 1863–1867	Succeeded by Caleb Newbold Taylor
