= Fourteenth session of the Florida House of Representatives =

Session of the Florida House of Representatives

The Fourteenth session of the Florida House of Representatives began December 18, 1865, at the state capitol in Tallahassee, Florida, under a revised Florida Constitution. The legislative session ended January 16, 1866. David S. Walker was governor.

October 25, 1865 a convention of delegates was held in the House of Representatives in Tallahassee. William Marvin was provisional governor. The 1865 General Assembly passed various acts and resolutions published in a journal.

== Elected members ==
- F. C. Barrett Alachua County
- Henry Durham Calhoun County
- Joseph N. Haddock Duval County
- James A. Peden Duval County
- Joseph A. Atkins Escambia County and Franklin County, Florida
- Lewis Hyer Escambia County
- J. J. Dickison Gadsden County
- Miles M. Johnston Gadsden County
- William H. Gee Gadsden County
- William L. Bush Hamilton County
- Walter T. Saxon Hernando County
- John M. F. Erwin Jackson County
- Henry J. Robinson Jackson County
- L. C. Armistead Jackson County
- C. G. Fife Jefferson County
- Anderson J. Peeler Jefferson County and Leon County
- A. M. Manning Jefferson County
- William W. Hankins Lafayette County
- Joseph John Williams Leon County
- G. Troup Maxwell Leon County
- P. B. Brokaw Leon County
- William R. Coulter Levy County
- John W. Hosford Liberty County
- William P. Moseley Madison County
- Thomas Pangford Madison County
- George M. Bates Marion County
- E. D. Howse Marion County
- Joseph B. Browne Monroe County, Florida
- Daniel Sanford Polk County
- Duncan McMillan Santa Rosa County
- John McLellan Santa Rosa County
- C. Lassiter Suwannee County
- James W. Faulkner Taylor County
- John S. Moring Wakulla County
- Daniel G. Gunn Walton County
- John L. McKinnon Walton County
- Thomas Brock Washington County

== See also ==
- American Civil War
- Reconstruction era
- 1865 United States House of Representatives election in Florida
