= William K. Cessna =

American judge and army officer

William K. Cessna was a Union Army officer, state legislator, and judge in the United States. He served as an officer with a colored regiment from Pennsylvania during the American Civil War. He served in Florida during the Civil War and settled there afterwards. He employed Josiah T. Walls in a lumber business. A Republican, he lived in Gainesville and served in the Florida House of Representatives for Alachua County in 1871 and 1872.

He was a signatory to the 1868 Florida Constitution. He made a motion to adopt a report that would have removed Liberty Billings, Charles H. Pearce and William Saunders from the convention. It failed to pass.

The governor appointed him a judge. He gave testimony in a hearing about an election. In 1874 he reported on agricultural conditions in Alachua County.

He chaired the committee preparing articles of impeachment against Harrison Reed. 1873 appointed Major and assistant quartermaster. He was accused of corruption by Democrats disparaging of "Carpetbag Rule". One account identified him as politically "rabid". He served as Alachua County Schools superintendent. Democrats filed accusations of corruption against him when he was in the legislature.

In 1878 U. S. President Rutherford B. Hayes nominated him to bepostmaster at Gainesville in Alachua County.

He was the editor and publisher of the Social Visitor in Jacksonville.

Cessna was also a farmer growing a variety of crops such as beans, tomatoes and strawberries that he sold not just to Florida but also much further north. He grew strawberries on several acres of land and was accused of selling them without paying tax on the sales. He was the first vice-president of the Fruit Growers' Association.
