= 1865 Florida gubernatorial election =

- November 29, 1865
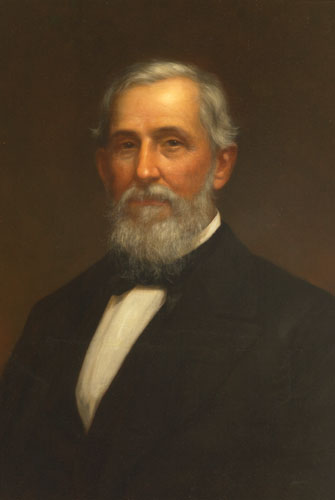
Nominee	David S. Walker
Party	Democratic
Popular vote	5,873
Percentage	100.00%
- County results Walker 90–100%
Governor before election
William Marvin
Independent
Elected Governor
David S. Walker
Democratic

The 1865 Florida gubernatorial election was held on November 29, 1865. Democratic nominee David S. Walker ran completely unopposed and was elected unanimously. This was the first Floridian gubernatorial election following the beginning of Reconstruction.

== General election ==
=== Candidates ===
==== Democratic ====
- David S. Walker

=== Results ===
1865 Florida gubernatorial election
Party	Candidate	Votes	%	±%
Democratic	David S. Walker	5,873	100.00%	
