= Caleb N. Taylor =

American politician

Caleb Newbold Taylor
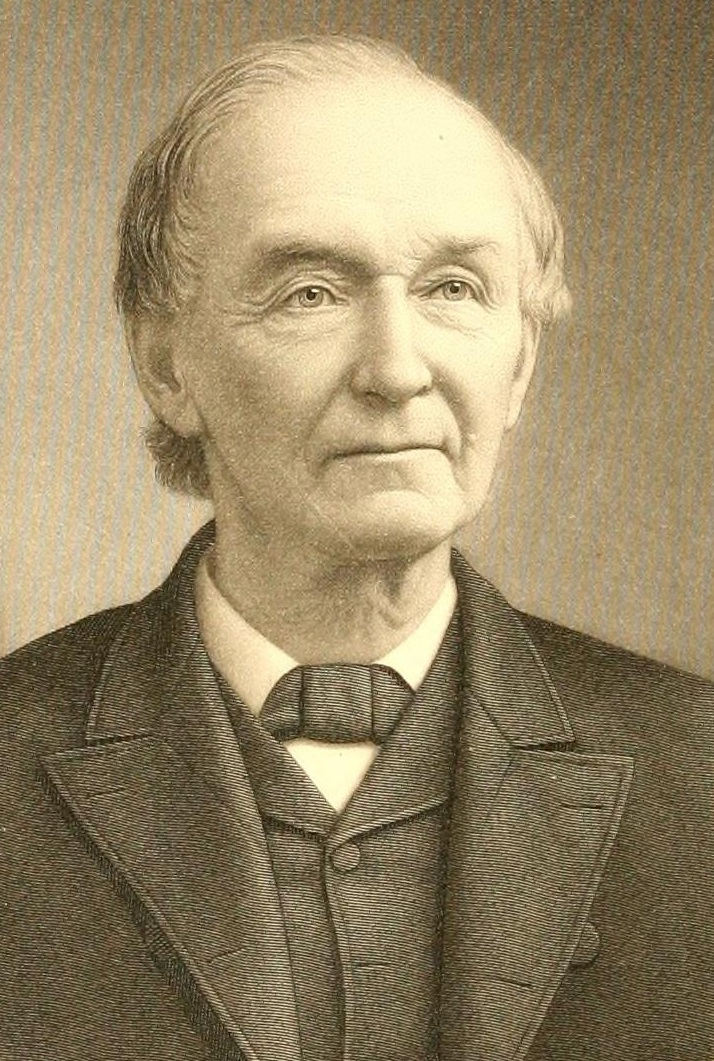

Member of the U.S. House of Representatives from Pennsylvania's 5th congressional district
- In office March 4, 1867 – March 3, 1869
- Preceded by: Martin R. Thayer
- Succeeded by: John R. Reading
- In office April 13, 1870 – March 3, 1871
- Preceded by: John R. Reading
- Succeeded by: Alfred C. Harmer

Personal details
- Born: Caleb Newbold Taylor; July 27, 1813 Newportville, Pennsylvania, US
- Died: November 15, 1887 (aged 74) Newportville, Pennsylvania, US
- Party: Republican
- Occupation: Banker, Politician

Caleb Newbold Taylor (July 27, 1813 – November 15, 1887) was an American politician who served two terms as a Republican member of the U.S. House of Representatives from Pennsylvania from 1867 to 1871,

== Early life ==
Caleb Newbold Taylor was born near Newportville, Pennsylvania. He was engaged in agricultural pursuits, and was a delegate to the Whig State convention at Harrisburg, Pennsylvania, in 1832. He was an unsuccessful candidate for election to Congress in 1848, 1850, and again in 1852. He was a delegate to the 1860 Republican National Convention.

Taylor managed the finances of his extended family. He was the older brother of Franklin Taylor, who was the father of the mechanical engineer and management consultant Frederick Winslow Taylor.

== United States House of Representatives ==
Taylor was elected as a Republican to the Fortieth Congress. He successfully contested the election of John R. Reading to the Forty-first Congress.

== Later career and death ==
Later he was engaged in banking, and was president of the Farmers’ National Bank of Bristol, Pennsylvania, from 1875 until his death in 1887 at his home, "Sunbury Farm," near Newportville. At the time of his death he owned 1335 acres of land on 9 farms and 30 houses. His combined assets were worth $315,617.73.

U.S. House of Representatives
Preceded by Martin R. Thayer	Member of the U.S. House of Representatives from Pennsylvania's 5th congressional district 1867–1869	Succeeded by John R. Reading
Preceded by John R. Reading	Member of the U.S. House of Representatives from Pennsylvania's 5th congressional district 1870–1871	Succeeded by Alfred C. Harmer
