= John Roberts Reading =

American politician (1826–1886)

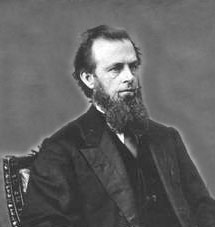

Member of the U.S. House of Representatives from Pennsylvania's 5th district
- In office March 4, 1869 – April 13, 1870
- Preceded by: Caleb Newbold Taylor
- Succeeded by: Caleb Newbold Taylor

Personal details
- Born: November 1, 1826 Philadelphia, Pennsylvania, U.S.
- Died: February 14, 1886 (aged 59) Philadelphia, Pennsylvania, U.S.
- Resting place: William Penn Cemetery, Philadelphia, Pennsylvania, U.S.
- Party: Democratic
- Education: Jefferson Medical College; Hahnemann University
- Profession: Politician

John Roberts Reading (November 1, 1826 – February 14, 1886) was a Democratic member of the United States House of Representatives from Pennsylvania.

== Biography ==
Born in Somerton, Philadelphia on November 1, 1826, Reading completed preparatory studies, graduated from the Jefferson Medical College in Philadelphia, Pennsylvania, in 1847 and began practice in Somerton. He later graduated from Hahnemann College in Philadelphia and practiced homeopathy.

Reading presented credentials as a Democratic Member-elect to the 41st United States Congress and served from March 4, 1869, to April 13, 1870, when he was succeeded by Caleb Newbold Taylor, who contested his election. He was an unsuccessful Democratic candidate for election in 1870.

== Death and interment ==
Reading died in Philadelphia on February 14, 1886, and was interred in the William Penn Cemetery in Somerton.

== Sources ==
- United States Congress. "John Roberts Reading (id: R000096)". Biographical Directory of the United States Congress.
- The Political Graveyard

U.S. House of Representatives
Preceded by Caleb Newbold Taylor	Member of the U.S. House of Representatives from Pennsylvania's 5th congressional district 1869–1870	Succeeded by Caleb Newbold Taylor
