= John Moffet (politician) =

American politician (1831-1884)

Member of the U.S. House of Representatives from Pennsylvania's 3rd district
- In office March 4, 1869 – April 9, 1869
- Preceded by: Leonard Myers
- Succeeded by: Leonard Myers

Personal details
- Born: April 5, 1831 County Antrim, Ireland
- Died: June 19, 1884 (aged 53) Philadelphia, Pennsylvania, U.S.
- Resting place: Laurel Hill Cemetery, Philadelphia, Pennsylvania, U.S.
- Party: Democratic Party
- Education: University of Pennsylvania

John Moffet (April 5, 1831 – June 19, 1884) was an Irish-American politician who served as a Democratic member of the U.S. House of Representatives for Pennsylvania's 3rd congressional district. The election was contested by Leonard Myers on the grounds that several wards in Philadelphia submitted false results. The House of Representatives conducted an investigation and voted that Myers was the winner. Mofett only served from March 4, 1869 to April 9, 1869.

== Early life and education ==
Moffet was born in County Antrim, Ireland. He immigrated to the United States with his parents, who settled in Philadelphia. He studied medicine at the University of Pennsylvania and became an apothecary in 1853.

== Career ==
He served as director and controller of the public schools in Philadelphia from 1860 to 1869.

He ran as the Democratic party candidate for Pennsylvania's 3rd congressional district and on October 13, 1869, was determined the winner over Leonard Myers. On November 12, Myers contested the election on the grounds that several wards in the city of Philadelphia submitted false election results. After witnesses were interviewed and depositions given, the House of Representative voted that Myers was the winner of the election. Moffet only served one month, from March 4, 1869 to April 9, 1869.

He died on June 19, 1884, in Philadelphia and was interred at Laurel Hill Cemetery.

U.S. House of Representatives
Preceded by Leonard Myers	Member of the U.S. House of Representatives from Pennsylvania's 3rd congressional district 1869	Succeeded by Leonard Myers
