= Aaron A. Sargent =

American journalist, lawyer, politician and diplomat (1827–1887)

Aaron Augustus Sargent
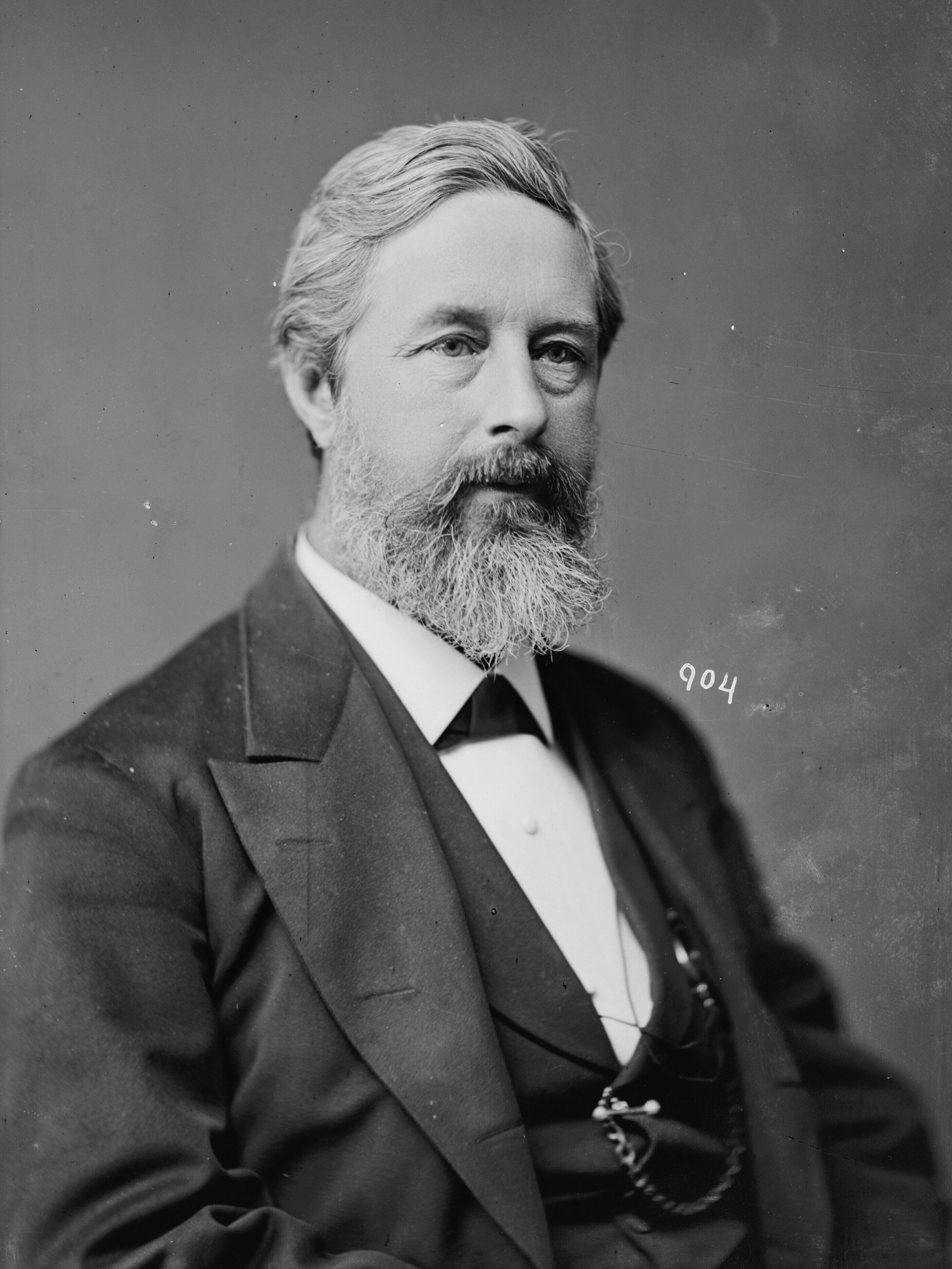
- Portrait by Brady c. 1869–1879

United States Envoy to the German Empire
- In office August 15, 1881 – September 10, 1884
- President: James A. Garfield; Chester A. Arthur
- Preceded by: Andrew Dickson White
- Succeeded by: John Adam Kasson

United States Senator from California
- In office March 4, 1873 – March 3, 1879
- Preceded by: Cornelius Cole
- Succeeded by: James T. Farley

Member of the U.S. House of Representatives from California
- In office March 4, 1869 – March 3, 1873
- Preceded by: William Higby
- Succeeded by: Horace F. Page
- Constituency: 2nd district
- In office March 4, 1861 – March 3, 1863
- Preceded by: Charles L. Scott
- Succeeded by: William Higby
- Constituency: At-large district

District Attorney of Nevada County
- In office 1856–1857

Personal details
- Born: September 28, 1827 Newburyport, Massachusetts, U.S.
- Died: August 14, 1887 (aged 59) San Francisco, California, U.S.
- Party: Republican
- Spouse: Ellen Clark (m. 1852)
- Profession: Journalist, lawyer, politician

Aaron Augustus Sargent (September 28, 1827 – August 14, 1887) was an American journalist, lawyer, politician and diplomat. In 1878, Sargent historically introduced what would later become the 19th Amendment to the U.S. Constitution, giving women the right to vote. He was sometimes called the "Senator for the Southern Pacific Railroad".

== Early life and education ==
Born in Newburyport, Massachusetts, he attended the common schools and then was apprenticed to a cabinetmaker. In his youth, he worked as a printer in Philadelphia and then, in 1847, moved to Washington, D.C., where he was a secretary to a Congressman.

== Career ==
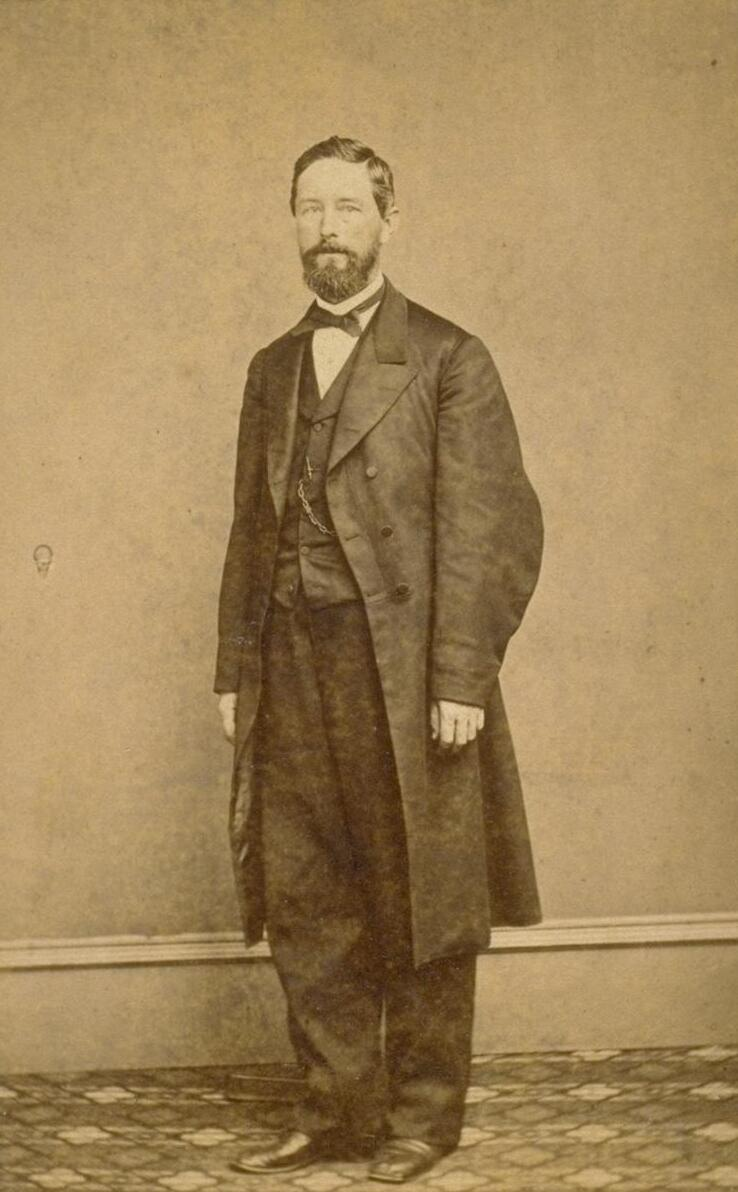
Sargent c. 1860s

He moved to California in 1849 and settled in Nevada City in 1850. There he was on the staff of the Nevada Daily Journal, eventually becoming that newspaper's owner. He was admitted to the California bar in 1854 and began practicing in Nevada City, becoming district attorney for Nevada County in 1856. He served in the California State Senate in 1856, and was an unsuccessful candidate for U.S. Senate in 1857.

=== Congress ===
Sargent was elected as a Republican to the 37th Congress; skipped several terms and was reelected to the 41st and 42nd Congresses. In 1861 he was the author of the first Pacific Railroad Act that was passed in Congress.

He was elected to the United States Senate in 1871 and served from 1873 to 1879. During his time in the Senate, he was chairman of the U.S. Senate Committee on Mines and Mining during the 44th Congress and chairman of the U.S. Senate Committee on Naval Affairs during the 45th Congress.

=== Women's rights ===
In January 1878, Senator Sargent introduced the 29 words that would later become the 19th Amendment to the United States Constitution, allowing women the right to vote. Sargent's wife, Ellen Clark Sargent, was a leading voting rights advocate and a friend of such suffrage leaders as Susan B. Anthony. The bill calling for the amendment would be introduced unsuccessfully each year for the next forty years.

=== Ambassador to Germany ===
Portrait by I. W. Taber, 1880

Sargent returned to California in 1880. After leaving the Senate he practiced law in San Francisco for three years, leaving to become United States Ambassador to Germany for two years, and held office until German authorities excluded American pork from the German Empire which made his position personally distasteful. He turned down the appointment of Ambassador to Russia after William H. Hunt's death and made an unsuccessful attempt for the Republican nomination for the Senate in 1885.

== Death and legacy ==
He died in San Francisco in 1887. His original interment at Laurel Hill Cemetery in San Francisco, which closed by 1941. According to Sargent's descendants, A.A. Sargent's ashes were spread over the placer mine he had in Nevada City and a monument to him may be found in the old Pioneer Cemetery in Nevada City.

Sargent was a noted proponent of the Chinese Exclusion Act of 1882, arguing in Overland Monthly in support of exclusion and for the renewal of the 1882 Exclusion Act after its expiration in 1892. The Chinese Exclusion Act was eventually renewed in 1892, and again—indefinitely—in 1902, staying in effect until 1943.

== Caricature gallery ==
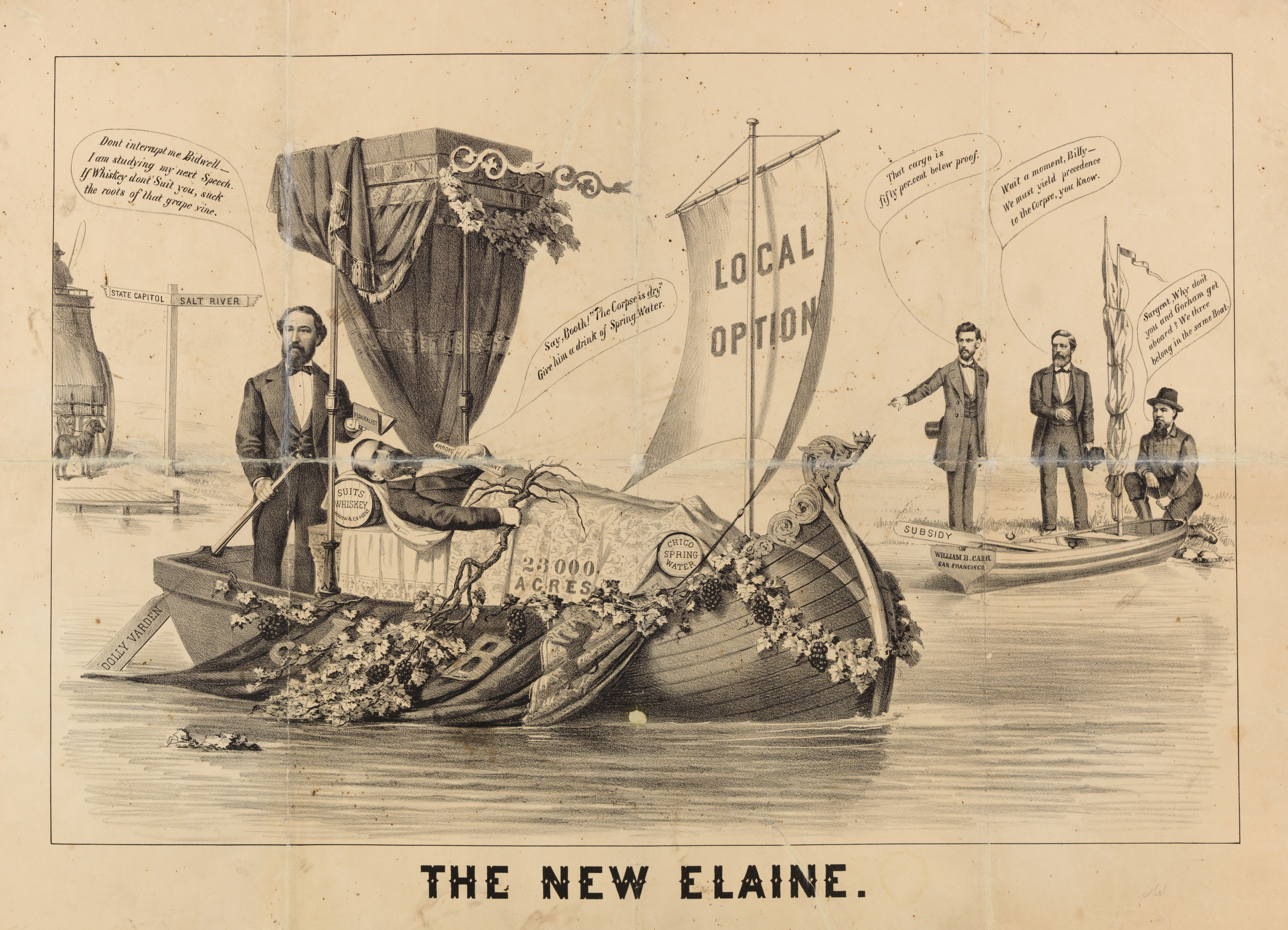
"The New Elaine"

"Hayes Providing Gorham and Sargent With the Sinews of the Campaign for California"

"Supervisor Nathl. Holland Carrying out the madates of the Republican party in the interest of Governor Hayes"

"I say Abraham, this fellow Sargent wants to be our next Senator again"

"Here I AM for Ever! (Ex Senator Sargent)"

"'Desert's' in the Air—The Land Steal of California"

"The Nail Eh? Sensation!"

"'They Stand Like Dumb Statues, Amid the Ruins of the Republican Party in California if They Do Not Speak.' —Ex."

"A Russia-Turco War in California"

"The Men of the Ring"

"The War on the Ring"

"The Lying Club. How Is It That Ye Agreed Together To Tempt the Spirit of the Lord? (Acts V.–9.)"

"Gorham's Political Marionettes"

"Celebrating the Glorious Fourth, The Patriots in Procession"

"The Lucky Sportsman’s Return, Delight of the Whole… Cur(ney) Excepted"

"'Old Mother Hubbard Went to the Cupboard'"

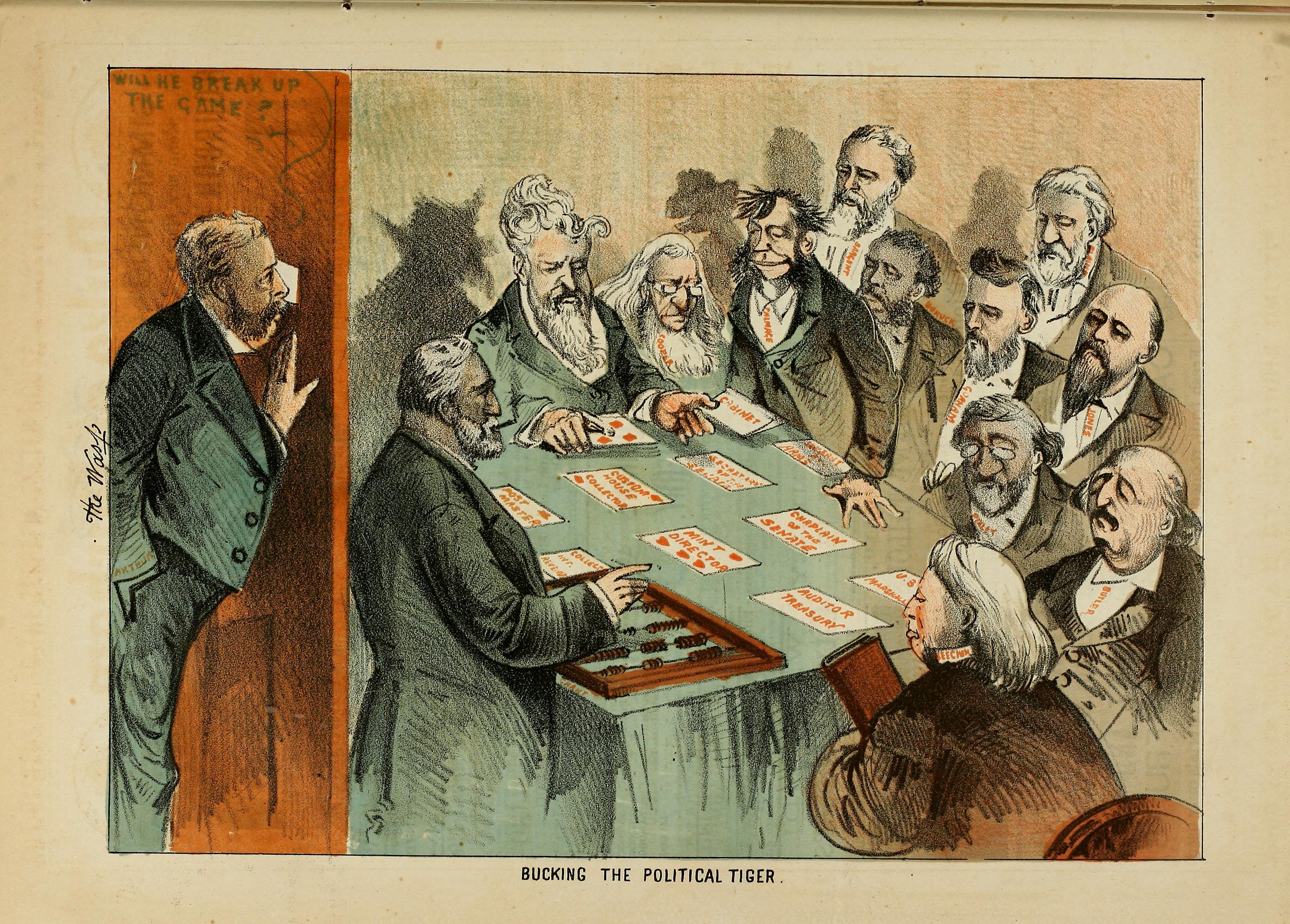
"Bucking the Political Tiger"

"Gulliver and the Liliputians"

"St. Valentine"

"The Lone Fisherman"

"Off His Hands"

"All About a Pig"

"'Giving to Each Applicant One-Half of the Shell. He Kept the Kernel for Himself.' --Old Fable"

U.S. House of Representatives
Preceded by Charles L. Scott	Member of the U.S. House of Representatives from California's at-large congressional district 1861–1863	Succeeded by William Higby
Preceded by William Higby	Member of the U.S. House of Representatives from California's 2nd congressional district 1869–1873	Succeeded by Horace F. Page
U.S. Senate
Preceded by Cornelius Cole	U.S. senator (Class 3) from California; 1873–1879; Served alongside: Eugene Casserly, John S. Hager and Newton Booth	Succeeded by James T. Farley
Diplomatic posts
Preceded by Andrew D. White	United States Ambassador to Germany; 1882–1884	Succeeded by John A. Kasson
