= 1867 United States House of Representatives elections in California =

United States House of Representatives elections in California, 1867
- September 6, 1867

All 3 California seats to the United States House of Representatives
	Majority party	Minority party
Party	Democratic	Republican
Last election	0	3
Seats won	2	1
Seat change	▲2	▼2
Popular vote	48,346	44,436
Percentage	52.1%	47.9%
Swing	▲11.1%	▼11.1%

Democratic
50–60%
Republican
50–60%
Winners
Democratic gain
Republican hold

The United States House of Representatives elections in California, 1867 was an election for California's delegation to the United States House of Representatives, which occurred on September 6, 1867, for the 40th Congress. The Democrats gained two districts from the Republicans.

== Results ==
=== District 1 ===
California's 1st congressional district election, 1867
Party	Candidate	Votes	%
Democratic	Samuel Beach Axtell	18,793	57.3
Republican	Timothy Guy Phelps	13,989	42.7
Total votes		32,782	100.0
Turnout			
Democratic gain from Republican			

=== District 2 ===
California's 2nd congressional district election, 1867
Party	Candidate	Votes	%
Republican	William Higby (incumbent)	16,053	52.0
Democratic	James W. Coffroth	14,786	48.0
Total votes		30,839	100.0
Turnout			
Republican hold			

=== District 3 ===
California's 3rd congressional district election, 1867
Party	Candidate	Votes	%
Democratic	James A. Johnson	14,767	50.6
Republican	Chancellor Hartson	14,394	49.4
Total votes		29,161	100.0
Turnout			
Democratic gain from Republican			

== See also ==
- 40th United States Congress
- Political party strength in California
- Political party strength in U.S. states
- United States House of Representatives elections, 1866
