= William Higby =

American politician, judge and editor (1813-1887)

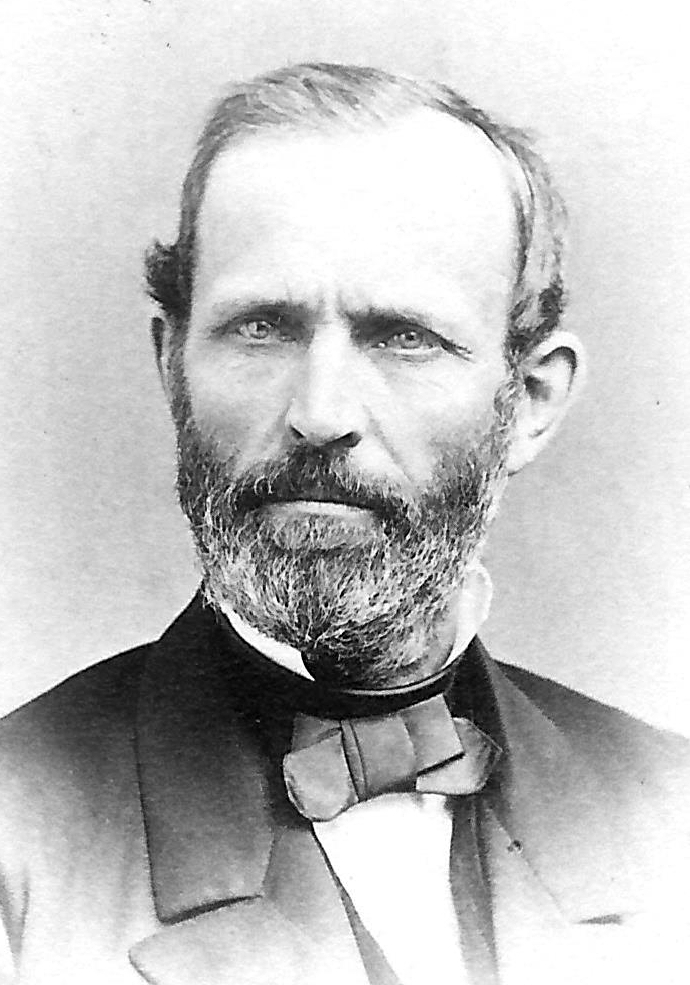

Member of the U.S. House of Representatives from California
- In office March 4, 1863 – March 3, 1869
- Preceded by: Aaron A. Sargent
- Succeeded by: Aaron A. Sargent
- Constituency: At-Large Seat B (1863–65); 2nd district (1865–69)

Personal details
- Born: August 18, 1813 Willsboro, New York, US
- Died: November 27, 1887 (aged 74) Santa Rosa, California, US
- Party: Republican
- Spouse: Ellen M. Ringer
- Education: University of Vermont
- Occupation: Lawyer

William Higby (August 18, 1813 – November 27, 1887) was a 19th-century American politician, a Republican, a lawyer, a district attorney, a judge, a newspaper editor, and a United States representative from California, serving three terms, from 1863 to 1869.

== Biography ==
Higby was born in Willsboro, New York. He spent his boyhood on his father's farm and worked in the lumber and iron business. He attended a preparatory school in Westport, New York and was graduated from the University of Vermont in 1840, where he was a founding member of the Lambda Iota Society. He studied law and was admitted to the bar in 1847 and commenced practice in Elizabethtown, New York.

== Career ==
Higby moved to California in 1850 and settled in Calaveras County. After an unsuccessful attempt in the mining business, he resumed the practice of law and was a district attorney from 1853 to 1859. Due to his harsh treatment of criminals, he earned the rough nickname, "Bloody Bill". He was a district judge from 1859 to 1861. Higby served in the California State Senate in 1862 and 1863.

=== Congress ===
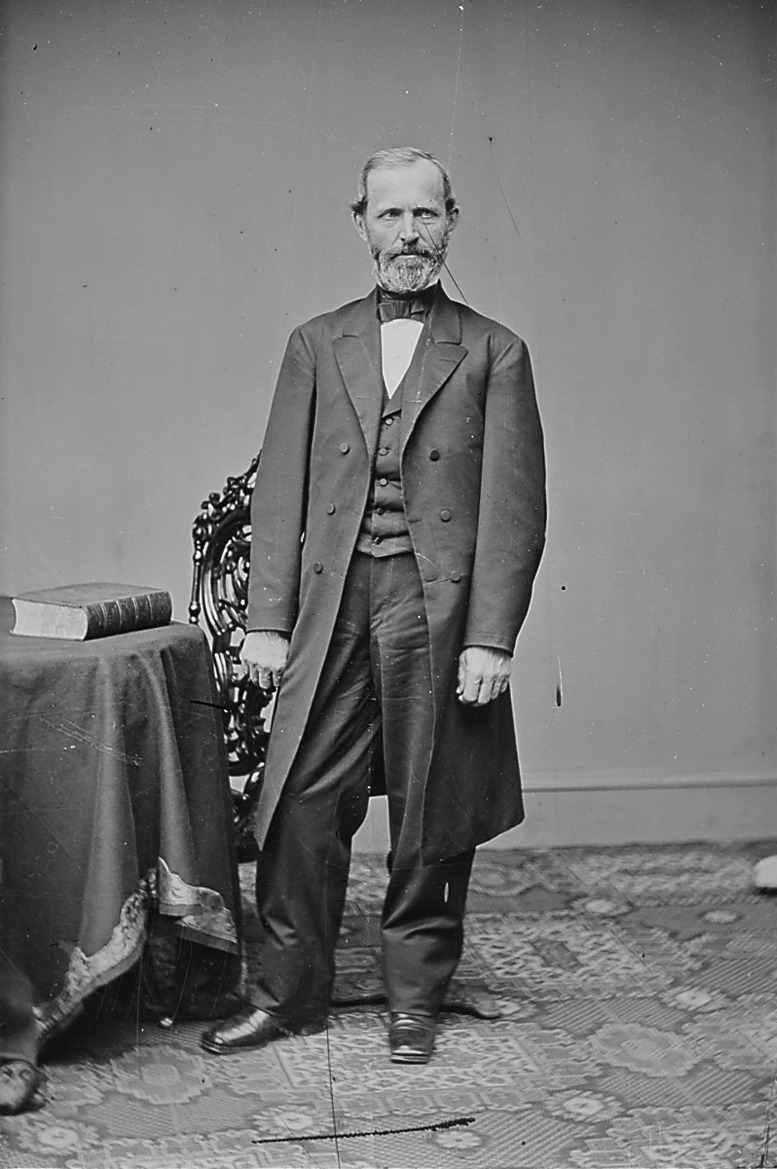
Portrait by Brady c. 1863–1865

Higby was elected as a Republican to the Thirty-eighth, Thirty-ninth, and Fortieth Congresses and served from March 4, 1863, to March 3, 1869. During the Fortieth Congress he served as the chairman of the committee on mines and mining. He married Ellen M. Ringer, daughter of Joseph Ringer, in 1865. He was a delegate to the Philadelphia Loyalist's Convention of 1866. He was a frequent guest at the Lincoln White House.

He was chair of the Committee on Mines and Mining (Thirty-ninth and Fortieth Congresses). Higby was unsuccessful for renomination in 1868.

=== Later career ===
He was the editor of the Calaveras Chronicle for several years. Appointed by President Ulysses S. Grant, he was also the collector of internal revenue from 1877 to 1881.

== Death ==
Higby devoted himself to horticulture until his death. Stricken with paralysis three years before, he died in Santa Rosa, California in 1887. He was interred in Mountain View Cemetery in Oakland, California.

== Electoral history ==
1863 California's at-large congressional district election
Party	Candidate	Votes	%
Republican	Cornelius Cole	65,085	23.1
Republican	Thomas B. Shannon	64,914	23.0
Republican	William Higby	64,883	23.0
Democratic	John B. Weller	43,567	15.5
Democratic	John Bigler	43,520	15.4
Total votes		281,969	100.0
Turnout			

1864 United States House of Representatives elections in California, 2nd district
Party	Candidate	Votes	%
Republican	William Higby	23,414	61.6
Democratic	James W. Coffroth	14,581	38.4
Total votes		37,995	100.0
Turnout			
Republican hold			

1867 United States House of Representatives elections in California, 2nd district
Party	Candidate	Votes	%
Republican	William Higby (incumbent)	16,053	52.0
Democratic	James W. Coffroth	14,786	48.0
Total votes		30,839	100.0
Turnout			
Republican hold			

U.S. House of Representatives
Preceded by Aaron Augustus Sargent	Member of the U.S. House of Representatives from California's at-large congressional district 1863-1869	Seat eliminated
