= Charles A. Sullivan =

American politician

Charles A. Sullivan was a lawyer who served as a state legislator in Mississippi during the Reconstruction era. He served in the Mississippi House of Representatives. The Clarion-Ledger identified him has a Radical Republican state senator-elect.
