= Charles Memorial Hamilton =

American politician

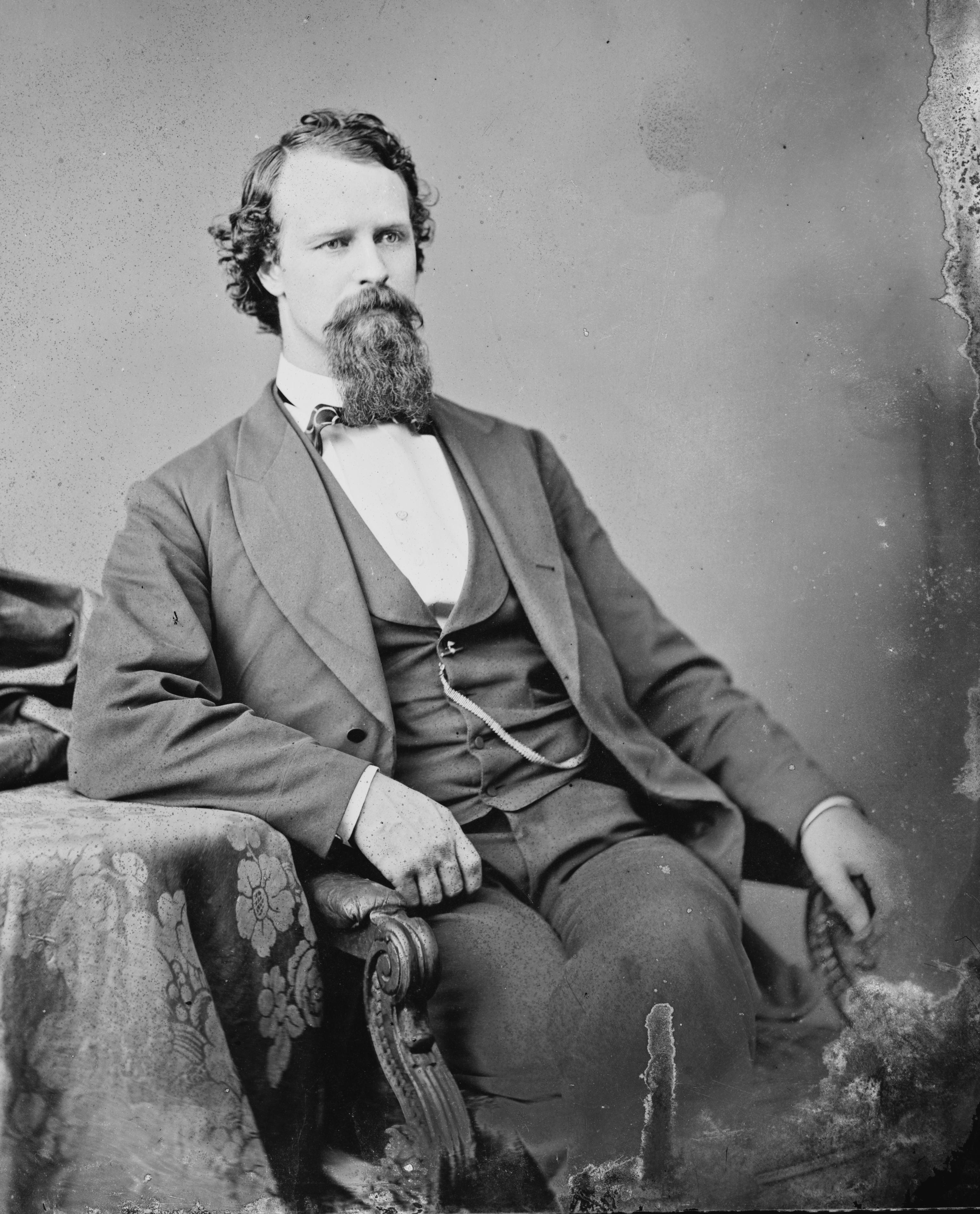

Member of the U.S. House of Representatives from Florida's at-large district
- In office July 1, 1868 – March 3, 1871
- Preceded by: George S. Hawkins (pre-Civil War)
- Succeeded by: Josiah T. Walls

Personal details
- Born: November 1, 1840 Pine Creek Township, Pennsylvania, US
- Died: October 22, 1875 (aged 34) Pine Creek Township, Pennsylvania, US
- Party: Republican

Charles Memorial Hamilton (November 1, 1840 – October 22, 1875) was a U.S. representative from Florida. A Republican, he was from Pennsylvania and served in the Union Army. He was succeeded by Josiah T. Walls, an African American.

== Early life ==
Born in Pine Creek Township, Clinton County, Pennsylvania, Hamilton attended public schools and was graduated from the Columbia Law School in Columbia, Pennsylvania.

== Civil War ==
During the American Civil War, Hamilton entered the Union Army as a private in 1861 and served in Company A, Fifth Regiment, Pennsylvania Reserves. He was appointed judge-advocate of the general court-martial and general pass officer for the Army of the Potomac and also served on the staff of the Military Governor of Washington, D.C., until he was transferred to Marianna, Florida in 1865.

== Legal career ==
Hamilton was admitted to the bar in 1867 and commenced practicing law in Marianna, Florida.

== Political career ==
Upon the readmission of the State of Florida to representation, Hamilton was elected as a Republican to the Fortieth and Forty-first Congresses and served from July 1, 1868, to March 3, 1871. He was unsuccessful in his candidacy for renomination in 1870.

== Militia leader and government official ==
Hamilton was appointed Senior Major General of the Florida Militia in February 1871, was postmaster of Jacksonville, Florida from July 27, 1871, to March 1, 1872, and was appointed collector of customs at Key West, Florida, in February 1872, a position from which he resigned on account of ill health.

== Death ==
Hamilton died in Pine Creek Township, Pennsylvania, and was interred at the Jersey Shore Cemetery.

U.S. House of Representatives
Preceded by George S. Hawkins	Member of the U.S. House of Representatives from Florida's at-large congressional district 1868 – 1871	Succeeded by Josiah T. Walls
