= William U. Saunders =

American politician (1835–1883)

William U. Saunders (1835 - September 1, 1883) was a barber, soldier, politician, and lawyer who represented Gadsden County, Florida, in the Florida Legislature during the Reconstruction era.

He was born in Baltimore, Maryland. He served in the United States Colored Infantry from 1863-1866. The Lincoln Zouaves unit of the Henry Winter Davis Guard may have been coordinated partly by Saunders. In August of 1869 he was appointed special agent of the Post Office Department, for an annual salary of $1,200; he was the first black person to hold this position. He was a delegate from Gadsden County to the 1868 Constitutional Convention of Florida despite having been in the county only a few days in his life, according to one account. He had been a barber in Illinois or Maryland. He was described as an eloquent speaker. In 1948 he was described as a Northern Radical Republican.

He traveled the state rallying Black voters.

Historian T. D. Allman wrote that racist revisionists tried to recast him as mulatto to deny his being a black man.

An African American, he served in the United States Colored Infantry from 1863-1866. Canter Brown Jr. documented him as "mulatto". He represented Gadsden County at the 1868 Florida Constitutional Convention. He described as a "fluent speaker."

He died in Clinton, Kentucky.

== Works cited ==
- Graham, Leroy (1982). Baltimore, the nineteenth century black capital. Washington, D.C. : University Press of America. ISBN 978-0-8191-2624-5.
