= List of United States representatives in the 41st Congress =

This is a complete list of United States representatives during the 41st United States Congress listed by seniority.

As an historical article, the districts and party affiliations listed reflect those during the 41st Congress (March 4, 1869 – March 3, 1871). Seats and party affiliations on similar lists for other congresses will be different for certain members.

Seniority depends on the date on which members were sworn into office. Since many members are sworn in on the same day, subsequent ranking is based on previous congressional service of the individual and then by alphabetical order by the last name of the representative.

Committee chairmanship in the House is often associated with seniority. However, party leadership is typically not associated with seniority.

Note: The "*" indicates that the representative/delegate may have served one or more non-consecutive terms while in the House of Representatives of the United States Congress.

== U.S. House seniority list ==
U.S. House seniority
Rank	Representative	Party	District	Seniority date (Previous service, if any)	No.# of term(s)	Notes
1	Elihu B. Washburne	R	IL-03	March 4, 1853	9th term	Dean of the House; Resigned on March 6, 1869.
2	Henry L. Dawes	R	MA-10	March 4, 1857	7th term	Dean of the House after Washburne resigned.
3	Fernando C. Beaman	R	MI-01	March 4, 1861	5th term	Left the House in 1871.
4	George W. Julian	R	IN-04	March 4, 1861; Previous service, 1849–1851.	6th term*	Left the House in 1871.
5	William D. Kelley	R	PA-04	March 4, 1861	5th term	
6	Samuel Hooper	R	MA-04	December 2, 1861	5th term	
7	William B. Allison	R	IA-03	March 4, 1863	4th term	Left the House in 1871.
8	Oakes Ames	R	MA-02	March 4, 1863	4th term	
9	James G. Blaine	R	ME-03	March 4, 1863	4th term	Speaker of the House
10	George S. Boutwell	R	MA-07	March 4, 1863	4th term	Resigned on March 12, 1869.
11	Amasa Cobb	R	WI-03	March 4, 1863	4th term	Left the House in 1871.
12	Nathan F. Dixon II	R	RI-02	March 4, 1863; Previous service, 1849–1851.	5th term*	Left the House in 1871.
13	Charles A. Eldredge	D	WI-04	March 4, 1863	4th term	
14	John F. Farnsworth	R	IL-02	March 4, 1863; Previous service, 1857–1861.	6th term*	
15	James A. Garfield	R	OH-19	March 4, 1863	4th term	
16	Thomas Jenckes	R	RI-01	March 4, 1863	4th term	Left the House in 1871.
17	Charles O'Neill	R	PA-02	March 4, 1863	4th term	Left the House in 1871.
18	Godlove Stein Orth	R	IN-07	March 4, 1863	4th term	Left the House in 1871.
19	Samuel J. Randall	D	PA-01	March 4, 1863	4th term	
20	Robert C. Schenck	R	OH-03	March 4, 1863; Previous service, 1843–1851.	8th term*	Resigned on January 5, 1871.
21	Glenni W. Scofield	R	PA-19	March 4, 1863	4th term	
22	William B. Washburn	R	MA-09	March 4, 1863	4th term	
23	Ebon C. Ingersoll	R	IL-05	May 20, 1864	4th term	Left the House in 1871.
24	John F. Benjamin	R	MO-08	March 4, 1865	3rd term	Left the House in 1871.
25	John Bingham	R	OH-16	March 4, 1865; Previous service, 1855–1863.	7th term*	
26	Sidney Clarke	R	KS	March 4, 1865	3rd term	Left the House in 1871.
27	Burton C. Cook	R	IL-06	March 4, 1865	3rd term	
28	Shelby M. Cullom	R	IL-08	March 4, 1865	3rd term	Left the House in 1871.
29	Thomas W. Ferry	R	MI-04	March 4, 1865	3rd term	Resigned on March 3, 1871.
30	Michael C. Kerr	D	IN-02	March 4, 1865	3rd term	
31	John H. Ketcham	R	NY-12	March 4, 1865	3rd term	
32	Addison H. Laflin	R	NY-20	March 4, 1865	3rd term	Left the House in 1871.
33	William Lawrence	R	OH-04	March 4, 1865	3rd term	Left the House in 1871.
34	John Lynch	R	ME-01	March 4, 1865	3rd term	
35	Samuel S. Marshall	D	IL-11	March 4, 1865; Previous service, 1855–1859.	5th term*	
36	Ulysses Mercur	R	PA-13	March 4, 1865	3rd term	
37	William E. Niblack	D	IN-01	March 4, 1865; Previous service, 1857–1861.	5th term*	
38	Halbert E. Paine	R	WI-01	March 4, 1865	3rd term	Left the House in 1871.
39	Philetus Sawyer	R	WI-05	March 4, 1865	3rd term	
40	Lawrence S. Trimble	D	KY-01	March 4, 1865	3rd term	Left the House in 1871.
41	Robert T. Van Horn	R	MO-06	March 4, 1865	3rd term	Left the House in 1871.
42	Hamilton Ward Sr.	R	NY-27	March 4, 1865	3rd term	Left the House in 1871.
43	Martin Welker	R	OH-14	March 4, 1865	3rd term	Left the House in 1871.
44	Nathaniel P. Banks	R	MA-06	December 4, 1865; Previous service, 1853–1857.	6th term*	
45	Isaac R. Hawkins	R	TN-07	December 4, 1865	3rd term	Left the House in 1871.
46	Samuel M. Arnell	R	TN-06	July 24, 1866	3rd term	Left the House in 1871.
47	Horace Maynard	R	TN-02	July 24, 1866; Previous service, 1857–1863.	6th term*	
48	William Brickly Stokes	R	TN-03	July 24, 1866; Previous service, 1859–1861.	4th term*	Left the House in 1871.
49	George M. Adams	D	KY-08	March 4, 1867	2nd term	
50	Stevenson Archer	D	MD-02	March 4, 1867	2nd term	
51	Daniel Myers Van Auken	D	PA-11	March 4, 1867	2nd term	Left the House in 1871.
52	Samuel Beach Axtell	D	CA-01	March 4, 1867	2nd term	Left the House in 1871.
53	William Henry Barnum	D	CT-04	March 4, 1867	2nd term	
54	James B. Beck	D	KY-07	March 4, 1867	2nd term	
55	Jacob Benton	R	NH-03	March 4, 1867	2nd term	Left the House in 1871.
56	Austin Blair	R	MI-03	March 4, 1867	2nd term	
57	James Brooks	D	NY-08	March 4, 1867; Previous service, 1849–1853 and 1863–1866.	7th term**	
58	Albert G. Burr	D	IL-10	March 4, 1867	2nd term	Left the House in 1871.
59	Benjamin Butler	R	MA-05	March 4, 1867	2nd term	
60	Roderick R. Butler	R	TN-01	March 4, 1867	2nd term	
61	Henry L. Cake	R	PA-10	March 4, 1867	2nd term	Left the House in 1871.
62	John C. Churchill	R	NY-22	March 4, 1867	2nd term	Left the House in 1871.
63	John Coburn	R	IN-05	March 4, 1867	2nd term	
64	Jacob H. Ela	R	NH-01	March 4, 1867	2nd term	Left the House in 1871.
65	Orange Ferriss	R	NY-16	March 4, 1867	2nd term	Left the House in 1871.
66	John Fox	D	NY-04	March 4, 1867	2nd term	Left the House in 1871.
67	James L. Getz	D	PA-08	March 4, 1867	2nd term	
68	Charles Haight	D	NJ-02	March 4, 1867	2nd term	Left the House in 1871.
69	John Hill	R	NJ-04	March 4, 1867	2nd term	
70	William S. Holman	D	IN-03	March 4, 1867; Previous service, 1859–1865.	5th term*	
71	Benjamin F. Hopkins	R	WI-02	March 4, 1867	2nd term	Died on January 1, 1870.
72	James A. Johnson	D	CA-03	March 4, 1867	2nd term	Left the House in 1871.
73	Thomas L. Jones	D	KY-06	March 4, 1867	2nd term	Left the House in 1871.
74	Norman B. Judd	R	IL-01	March 4, 1867	2nd term	Left the House in 1871.
75	William H. Kelsey	R	NY-25	March 4, 1867; Previous service, 1855–1859.	4th term*	Left the House in 1871.
76	J. Proctor Knott	D	KY-04	March 4, 1867	2nd term	Left the House in 1871.
77	John A. Logan	R	IL	March 4, 1867; Previous service, 1859–1862.	4th term*	Resigned on March 3, 1871.
78	William Loughridge	R	IA-04	March 4, 1867	2nd term	Left the House in 1871.
79	Dennis McCarthy	R	NY-23	March 4, 1867	2nd term	Left the House in 1871.
80	Daniel Johnson Morrell	R	PA-17	March 4, 1867	2nd term	Left the House in 1871.
81	William Moore	R	NJ-01	March 4, 1867	2nd term	Left the House in 1871.
82	John Morrissey	D	NY-05	March 4, 1867	2nd term	Left the House in 1871.
83	William Mungen	D	OH-05	March 4, 1867	2nd term	Left the House in 1871.
84	John A. Peters	R	ME-04	March 4, 1867	2nd term	
85	Luke P. Poland	R	VT-02	March 4, 1867	2nd term	
86	John P. C. Shanks	R	IN-09	March 4, 1867; Previous service, 1861–1863.	3rd term*	
87	Worthington C. Smith	R	VT-03	March 4, 1867	2nd term	
88	Henry H. Starkweather	R	CT-03	March 4, 1867	2nd term	
89	Aaron F. Stevens	R	NH-02	March 4, 1867	2nd term	Left the House in 1871.
90	Frederick Stone	D	MD-05	March 4, 1867	2nd term	Left the House in 1871.
91	J. Hale Sypher	R	LA-01	March 4, 1867	2nd term	
92	John Taffe	D	NE	March 4, 1867	2nd term	
93	Ginery Twichell	R	MA-03	March 4, 1867	2nd term	
94	Philadelph Van Trump	D	OH-12	March 4, 1867	2nd term	
95	Cadwallader C. Washburn	R	WI-06	March 4, 1867; Previous service, 1855–1861.	5th term*	Left the House in 1871.
96	William Williams	R	IN-10	March 4, 1867	2nd term	
97	John T. Wilson	R	OH-11	March 4, 1867	2nd term	
98	Fernando Wood	D	NY-09	March 4, 1867; Previous service, 1841–1843 and 1863–1865.	4th term**	
99	George W. Woodward	D	PA-12	November 21, 1867	2nd term	Left the House in 1871.
100	Alexander H. Bailey	R	NY-21	November 30, 1867	2nd term	Left the House in 1871.
101	Jacob Golladay	D	KY-03	December 5, 1867	2nd term	Resigned on February 28, 1870.
102	James R. McCormick	D	MO-03	December 17, 1867	2nd term	
103	John Beatty	R	OH-08	February 5, 1868	2nd term	
104	Thomas Boles	R	AR-03	June 22, 1868	2nd term	Left the House in 1871.
105	Logan H. Roots	R	AR-01	June 22, 1868	2nd term	Left the House in 1871.
106	Charles M. Hamilton	R	FL	July 1, 1868	2nd term	Left the House in 1871.
107	John T. Deweese	R	NC-04	July 6, 1868	2nd term	Resigned on February 28, 1870
108	Alexander H. Jones	R	NC-07	July 6, 1868	2nd term	Left the House in 1871.
109	Oliver H. Dockery	R	NC-03	July 13, 1868	2nd term	Left the House in 1871.
110	David Heaton	R	NC-02	July 15, 1868	2nd term	Died on June 25, 1870.
111	Benjamin Franklin Whittemore	R	SC-01	July 18, 1868	2nd term	Resigned on February 24, 1870.
112	Christopher C. Bowen	R	SC-02	July 20, 1868	2nd term	Left the House in 1871.
113	Israel G. Lash	R	NC-05	July 20, 1868	2nd term	Left the House in 1871.
114	Charles Waldron Buckley	R	AL-02	July 21, 1868	2nd term	
115	Oliver J. Dickey	R	PA-09	December 7, 1868	2nd term	
116	Jacob A. Ambler	R	OH-17	March 4, 1869	1st term	
117	William Hepburn Armstrong	R	PA-18	March 4, 1869	1st term	Left the House in 1871.
118	Joel F. Asper	R	MO-07	March 4, 1869	1st term	Left the House in 1871.
119	David S. Bennett	R	NY-30	March 4, 1869	1st term	Left the House in 1871.
120	Benjamin T. Biggs	D	DE	March 4, 1869	1st term	
121	John T. Bird	D	NJ-03	March 4, 1869	1st term	
122	Sempronius H. Boyd	R	MO-04	March 4, 1869; Previous service, 1863–1865.	2nd term*	Left the House in 1871.
123	Alfred E. Buck	R	AL-01	March 4, 1869	1st term	Left the House in 1871.
124	James Buffington	R	MA-01	March 4, 1869; Previous service, 1855–1863.	5th term*	
125	Samuel S. Burdett	R	MO-05	March 4, 1869	1st term	
126	Hervey C. Calkin	D	NY-07	March 4, 1869	1st term	Left the House in 1871.
127	John Cessna	R	PA-16	March 4, 1869	1st term	Left the House in 1871.
128	Orestes Cleveland	D	NJ-05	March 4, 1869	1st term	Left the House in 1871.
129	Clinton L. Cobb	R	NC-01	March 4, 1869	1st term	
130	Omar D. Conger	R	MI-05	March 4, 1869	1st term	
131	George W. Cowles	R	NY-24	March 4, 1869	1st term	Left the House in 1871.
132	Samuel S. Cox	D	NY-06	March 4, 1869; Previous service, 1857–1865.	5th term*	
133	John M. Crebs	D	IL-13	March 4, 1869	1st term	
134	Chester Bidwell Darrall	R	LA-03	March 4, 1869	1st term	
135	Noah Davis	R	NY-28	March 4, 1869	1st term	Resigned on July 15, 1870.
136	Edward F. Dickinson	D	OH-09	March 4, 1869	1st term	Left the House in 1871.
137	Joseph B. Donley	R	PA-24	March 4, 1869	1st term	Left the House in 1871.
138	Peter M. Dox	D	AL-05	March 4, 1869	1st term	
139	Isaac H. Duval	R	WV-01	March 4, 1869	1st term	Left the House in 1871.
140	David P. Dyer	R	MO-09	March 4, 1869	1st term	Left the House in 1871.
141	Gustavus A. Finkelnburg	R	MO-02	March 4, 1869	1st term	
142	John Fisher	R	NY-29	March 4, 1869	1st term	Left the House in 1871.
143	Thomas Fitch	R	NV	March 4, 1869	1st term	Left the House in 1871.
144	Calvin W. Gilfillan	R	PA-20	March 4, 1869	1st term	Left the House in 1871.
145	George W. Greene	R	NY-11	March 4, 1869	1st term	Resigned on February 17, 1870.
146	John A. Griswold	D	NY-13	March 4, 1869	1st term	Left the House in 1871.
147	Richard J. Haldeman	D	PA-15	March 4, 1869	1st term	
148	Eugene Hale	R	ME-05	March 4, 1869	1st term	
149	Samuel Hambleton	D	MD-01	March 4, 1869	1st term	
150	Patrick Hamill	D	MD-04	March 4, 1869	1st term	Left the House in 1871.
151	John B. Hawley	R	IL-04	March 4, 1869	1st term	
152	Charles Hays	R	AL-04	March 4, 1869	1st term	
153	John B. Hay	R	IL-12	March 4, 1869	1st term	
154	Robert S. Heflin	R	AL-03	March 4, 1869	1st term	Left the House in 1871.
155	Truman H. Hoag	D	OH-10	March 4, 1869	1st term	Died on February 5, 1870.
156	George Frisbie Hoar	R	MA-08	March 4, 1869	1st term	
157	Giles W. Hotchkiss	R	NY-26	March 4, 1869; Previous service, 1863–1867.	3rd term*	Left the House in 1871.
158	Stephen W. Kellogg	R	CT-02	March 4, 1869	1st term	
159	Charles Knapp	R	NY-19	March 4, 1869	1st term	Left the House in 1871.
160	Stephen L. Mayham	D	NY-14	March 4, 1869	1st term	Left the House in 1871.
161	George W. McCrary	R	IA-01	March 4, 1869	1st term	
162	James McGrew	R	WV-02	March 4, 1869	1st term	
163	Thompson W. McNeely	D	IL-09	March 4, 1869	1st term	
164	John Moffet	D	PA-03	March 4, 1869	1st term	Resigned on April 9, 1869.
165	George W. Morgan	D	OH-13	March 4, 1869; Previous service, 1867–1868.	2nd term*	
166	Samuel P. Morrill	R	ME-02	March 4, 1869	1st term	Left the House in 1871.
167	Eliakim H. Moore	R	OH-15	March 4, 1869	1st term	Left the House in 1871.
168	Jesse Hale Moore	R	IL-07	March 4, 1869	1st term	
169	Frank Morey	R	LA-05	March 4, 1869	1st term	
170	James S. Negley	R	PA-22	March 4, 1869	1st term	
171	Jasper Packard	R	IN-11	March 4, 1869	1st term	
172	John B. Packer	R	PA-14	March 4, 1869	1st term	
173	Francis W. Palmer	R	IA-05	March 4, 1869	1st term	
174	Charles Pomeroy	R	IA-06	March 4, 1869	1st term	Left the House in 1871.
175	Darwin Phelps	R	PA-23	March 4, 1869	1st term	Left the House in 1871.
176	William Farrand Prosser	R	TN-05	March 4, 1869	1st term	Left the House in 1871.
177	Clarkson N. Potter	D	NY-10	March 4, 1869	1st term	
178	John R. Reading	D	PA-05	March 4, 1869	1st term	Resigned on April 13, 1870.
179	Henry A. Reeves	D	NY-01	March 4, 1869	1st term	Left the House in 1871.
180	John M. Rice	D	KY-09	March 4, 1869	1st term	
181	Anthony A. C. Rogers	D	AR-02	March 4, 1869	1st term	Left the House in 1871.
182	Stephen Sanford	R	NY-18	March 4, 1869	1st term	Left the House in 1871.
183	Aaron A. Sargent	R	CA-02	March 4, 1869; Previous service, 1861–1863.	2nd term*	
184	John G. Schumaker	D	NY-02	March 4, 1869	1st term	Left the House in 1871.
185	Lionel A. Sheldon	R	LA-02	March 4, 1869	1st term	
186	Porter Sheldon	R	NY-31	March 4, 1869	1st term	Left the House in 1871.
187	William C. Sherrod	D	AL-06	March 4, 1869	1st term	Left the House in 1871.
188	Francis E. Shober	D	NC-06	March 4, 1869	1st term	
189	Henry Warner Slocum	D	NY-03	March 4, 1869	1st term	
190	John Armstrong Smith	R	OH-06	March 4, 1869	1st term	
191	Joseph S. Smith	D	OR	March 4, 1869	1st term	Left the House in 1871.
192	William J. Smith	R	TN-08	March 4, 1869	1st term	Left the House in 1871.
193	William Smyth	R	IA-02	March 4, 1869	1st term	Died on September 30, 1870.
194	Job E. Stevenson	R	OH-02	March 4, 1869	1st term	
195	John D. Stiles	D	PA-06	March 4, 1869; Previous service, 1862–1865.	3rd term*	Left the House in 1871.
196	Peter W. Strader	D	OH-01	March 4, 1869	1st term	Left the House in 1871.
197	Randolph Strickland	R	MI-06	March 4, 1869	1st term	Left the House in 1871.
198	Julius L. Strong	R	CT-01	March 4, 1869	1st term	
199	William L. Stoughton	R	MI-02	March 4, 1869	1st term	
200	Thomas Swann	D	MD-03	March 4, 1869	1st term	
201	William N. Sweeney	D	KY-02	March 4, 1869	1st term	Left the House in 1871.
202	Adolphus H. Tanner	R	NY-15	March 4, 1869	1st term	Left the House in 1871.
203	Lewis Tillman	R	TN-04	March 4, 1869	1st term	Left the House in 1871.
204	Washington Townsend	R	PA-07	March 4, 1869	1st term	
205	James N. Tyner	R	IN-08	March 4, 1869	1st term	
206	William H. Upson	R	OH-18	March 4, 1869	1st term	
207	Daniel W. Voorhees	D	IN-06	March 4, 1869; Previous service, 1861–1866.	4th term*	
208	Erastus Wells	D	MO-01	March 4, 1869	1st term	
209	William A. Wheeler	R	NY-17	March 4, 1869; Previous service, 1861–1863.	2nd term*	
210	Morton S. Wilkinson	R	MN-01	March 4, 1869	1st term	Left the House in 1871.
211	Charles W. Willard	R	VT-01	March 4, 1869	1st term	
212	Eugene M. Wilson	D	MN-02	March 4, 1869	1st term	Left the House in 1871.
213	Boyd Winchester	D	KY-05	March 4, 1869	1st term	
214	James J. Winans	R	OH-07	March 4, 1869	1st term	Left the House in 1871.
215	John Witcher	R	WV-03	March 4, 1869	1st term	Left the House in 1871.
	Solomon L. Hoge	R	SC-03	April 8, 1869	1st term	Left the House in 1871.
	Leonard Myers	R	PA-03	April 9, 1869; Previous service, 1863–1869.	4th term*	
	George M. Brooks	R	MA-07	November 2, 1869	1st term	
	Horatio C. Burchard	R	IL-03	December 6, 1869	1st term	
	George Booker	R	VA-04	January 26, 1870	1st term	Left the House in 1871.
	Charles H. Porter	R	VA-03	January 26, 1870	1st term	
	William Milnes Jr.	R	VA-06	January 27, 1870	1st term	Left the House in 1871.
	James H. Platt Jr.	R	VA-02	January 27, 1870	1st term	
	Robert Ridgway	R	VA-05	January 27, 1870	1st term	Died on October 16, 1870.
	James K. Gibson	R	VA-08	January 28, 1870	1st term	Left the House in 1871.
	Richard S. Ayer	R	VA-01	January 31, 1870	1st term	Left the House in 1871.
	Lewis McKenzie	R	VA-07	January 31, 1870; Previous service, 1863.	2nd term*	Left the House in 1871.
	John Covode	W	PA-21	February 9, 1870; Previous service, 1855–1863 and 1867–1869.	6th term**	Died on January 11, 1871.
	Charles Van Wyck	R	NY-11	February 17, 1870; Previous service, 1859–1863 and 1867–1869.	4th term**	Left the House in 1871.
	David Atwood	R	WI-02	February 23, 1870	1st term	Left the House in 1871.
	George E. Harris	R	MS-01	February 23, 1870	1st term	
	George C. McKee	R	MS-04	February 23, 1870	1st term	
	Joseph L. Morphis	R	MS-02	February 23, 1870	1st term	
	Legrand W. Perce	R	MS-05	February 23, 1870	1st term	
	William T. Clark	R	TX-03	March 30, 1870	1st term	
	John C. Conner	D	TX-02	March 30, 1870	1st term	
	Edward Degener	R	TX-04	March 30, 1870	1st term	Left the House in 1871.
	George W. Whitmore	R	TX-01	March 30, 1870	1st term	Left the House in 1871.
	Henry W. Barry	R	MS-03	April 8, 1870	1st term	
	Caleb Newbold Taylor	R	PA-05	April 13, 1870; Previous service, 1867–1869.	2nd term*	Left the House in 1871.
	Erasmus D. Peck	R	OH-10	April 23, 1870	1st term	
	Joseph H. Lewis	D	KY-03	May 10, 1870	1st term	
	Joseph P. Newsham	R	LA-04	May 23, 1870; Previous service, 1868–1869.	2nd term*	Left the House in 1871.
	Alexander S. Wallace	R	SC-04	May 27, 1870	1st term	
	Richard Thomas Walker Duke	R	VA-05	November 8, 1870	1st term	
	Charles H. Holmes	R	NY-28	December 6, 1870	1st term	Left the House in 1871.
	Joseph Dixon	R	NC-02	December 6, 1870	1st term	Left the House in 1871.
	William P. Wolf	R	IA-02	December 6, 1870	1st term	Left the House in 1871.
	John Manning Jr.	D	NC-04	December 7, 1870	1st term	Left the House in 1871.
	Joseph Rainey	R	SC-01	December 12, 1870	1st term	
	Marion Bethune	R	GA-03	December 22, 1870	1st term	Left the House in 1871.
	William W. Paine	D	GA-01	December 22, 1870	1st term	Left the House in 1871.
	William P. Price	D	GA-06	December 22, 1870	1st term	
	Richard H. Whiteley	R	GA-02	December 22, 1870	1st term	
	Pierce M. B. Young	D	GA-07	December 22, 1870; Previous service, 1868–1869.	2nd term*	
	Jefferson F. Long	R	GA-04	January 16, 1871	1st term	Left the House in 1871.
	Stephen A. Corker	D	GA-05	January 24, 1871	1st term	Left the House in 1871.

== Delegates ==
Rank	Delegate	Party	District	Seniority date (Previous service, if any)	No.# of term(s)	Notes
1	William Henry Hooper	D	UT	March 4, 1865; Previous service, 1859–1861.	4th term*	
2	James M. Cavanaugh	D	MT	March 4, 1867; Previous service, 1858–1859.	3rd term*	
3	José Francisco Chaves	R	NM	February 20, 1869; Previous service, 1865–1867.	3rd term*	
4	Allen A. Bradford	R	CO	March 4, 1869; Previous service, 1865–1867.	2nd term*	
5	Jacob K. Shafer	D	ID	March 4, 1869	1st term	
6	Richard Cunningham McCormick	D	AZ	March 4, 1869	1st term	
7	Selucius Garfielde	R	WA	March 4, 1869	1st term	
8	Solomon L. Spink	R	DAK	March 4, 1869	1st term	
	Stephen Friel Nuckolls	D	WY	December 6, 1869	1st term	

== See also ==
- 41st United States Congress
- List of United States congressional districts
- List of United States senators in the 41st Congress
