= Charles Whittlesey (lawyer) =

American politician

Unionist Attorney General of Virginia
- In office September 10, 1869 – January 19, 1870
- Governor: Gilbert Carlton Walker
- Preceded by: Thomas Russell Bowden
- Succeeded by: James Craig Taylor

Personal details
- Born: October 1, 1819 Litchfield, Connecticut
- Died: December 9, 1874 (aged 55) Alexandria, Virginia
- Party: Republican
- Spouse: Ann Whittlesey
- Occupation: Lawyer

Charles Whittlesey (October 1, 1819 – December 9, 1874) was an American lawyer and newspaper publisher who briefly served as the Attorney General of Virginia at the end of Congressional Reconstruction.

== Early and family life ==
Born in Litchfield, Connecticut, to Eliphalet Whittlesey and his wife Martha Strond, Charles had two brothers (Philander and George) who had died by the time their father wrote his will in 1856 and named his son Walter to serve as executor along with his brother in law Lot Norton. After education, Charles Whittlesey became a lawyer and practiced in Connecticut for several years, even serving as a judge. He married Ann Whittlesey, and had adopted a son, also named Charles, who survived him.

== Military, publishing and Virginia career ==
During the American Civil War, Whittlesey recruited infantry Company I, of the 22nd Connecticut volunteers, and served as its captain. After being mustered out of the army, Whittlesey remained in Alexandria, Virginia, where he practiced law. He also edited the Alexandria Virginia State Journal, then moved to Richmond, Virginia (which had once again become the state capital) and renamed it the Richmond State Journal. Whittlesey also participated in the April 17, 1867 meeting of Republicans at Richmond's First African Baptist Church.

As Congressional Reconstruction was ending, General Edward Richard Sprigg Canby (who had succeeded Gen. John Schofield as governor of Military District No. 1 upon Schofield's promotion to Secretary of War) appointed Whittlesey Attorney General. Whittlesey held that position for about three months (September 10, 1869 until January 19, 1870, a week before Congress officially restored Virginia to the Union and seated her Senators and Congressmen). During the 1869 election, Whittlesey was the Republican candidate for U.S. Congress from Virginia's 7th District, but lost to Conservative Lewis McKenzie. After Gen. Canby removed Whittlesey from office, he continued to practice law in Richmond. Gen. Canby appointed James Craig Taylor to succeed him as appointed attorney general, since he was elected to that position in November and thus started his term early.

== Death and legacy ==
Whittlesey died at his Alexandria home of Bright's disease. His widow applied for and received a pension in Washington D.C. in 1893. His body was returned for burial in Spring Grove Cemetery in Hartford, Connecticut.
