= 24th Virginia Infantry Regiment =

- Flag of Virginia, 1861
- Active: June 1861 – April 1865
- Disbanded: April 1865
- Country: Confederacy
- Allegiance: Confederate States of America
- Branch: Confederate States Army
- Type: Infantry
- Engagements: First Battle of Manassas; Peninsula Campaign; Seven Days' Battles; Second Battle of Bull Run; Battle of Antietam; Battle of Fredericksburg; Siege of Suffolk; Battle of Gettysburg; Battle of Cold Harbor; Siege of Petersburg; Battle of Five Forks; Battle of Sailor's Creek; Battle of Williamsburg; Appomattox Campaign

Commanders
- Notable commanders: Colonel Jubal A. Early; Colonel William R. Terry

The 24th Virginia Infantry Regiment was an infantry regiment raised in southwestern Virginia for service in the Confederate States Army during the American Civil War. It fought throughout the conflict, mostly with the Army of Northern Virginia. The 24th Virginia's most prominent field officers were Colonels Jubal A. Early (who was promoted to brigade command after the battle and would become a key Confederate General) and William R. Terry; Lieutenant Colonels Peter Hairston, Jr. and Richard L. Maury; and Majors William W. Bentley, Joseph A. Hambrick, and J.P. Hammet.

== History ==
The 24th Virginia was assembled in Lynchburg in June, 1861, with companies recruited from Floyd, Franklin, Carroll, Giles, Patrick, Pulaski, Mercer, Montgomery County and Henry Counties.

After fighting under former U.S. Army officer and Franklin County delegate Col. Jubal Early at the First Manassas, the 24th Virginia was assigned to Brigades in the Army of Northern Virginia often colloquially referred to by the commander's surname—first commanded by Early (hence "Early's Brigade"), then after his promotion, by future CSA General and Virginia state senator W. R. Terry (hence "Terry's Brigade"), who was temporarily disabled by a wound at the Battle of Williamsburg and temporarily replaced as brigade commander by future CSA General and later Virginia Governor James L. Kemper (hence "Kemper's Brigade").

The 24th Virginia participated in the Army of Northern Virginia's campaigns from the Peninsula Campaign to Gettysburg, except when it was detached to Siege of Suffolk under Gen. Longstreet. It was involved in the Drewry's Bluff (May 1862), Plymouth (in Washington, North Carolina in April 1864), the Petersburg siege north of the James River (June 1864-March 1865), and the final Appomattox operations.

The regiment contained 740 men in April, 1862. It reported 189 casualties at Williamsburg and 107 casualties at Seven Pines as it defended the Confederate capitol at Richmond during the Peninsula Campaign. It lost 4 killed, 61 wounded, and 14 missing at Frayser's Farm, and 8 men were wounded at Fredericksburg. About forty percent of its 395 soldiers engaged at Gettysburg were disabled. Many were lost at Sayler's Creek in the war's final weeks. After General Lee formally surrendered the Army of Northern Virginia at Appomattox Court House, no officers but 22 men surrendered on April 9, 1865.

== Companies and officers ==
Sortable table
Company	Nickname	Recruited at	First (then later) Commanding Officer
A	Floyd Riflemen	Floyd County	Dr. Calohill M. Stigleman; John W. Shelton
B	Franklin Rifles	Franklin County	Joseph A. Hambrick (VMI); Charles E. Bernard; John A. Bernard; George E. Dennis
C	Carroll Boys	Carroll County	Alexander C. Brancom; William R. Jennings; Abner W. C. Nowlin
D	Early Guards	Franklin County	Thomas S. Taylor (VMI); Mordecai Cook
E	Pulaski boys	Dublin, Pulaski County	William W. Bentley; William Radford; James Randall Kent Jr. (VMI)
F	New River Rifles	Giles County	William Eggleston; Thomas Haden; Brainard Hines; George A. Porterfield
G		Mercer County	Robert A. Richardson; Benjamin P. Grigsby; Hercules Scott
H	Henry Guards	Henry County	Dr. Peter R. Reamey; Orren W. Barrow; Olerce Nolan; John W. Headen
I		Patrick County	Andrew Murray Lybrook
K	New River Grays	Montgomery County	Dr. James Preston Hammet(VMI); John Henry LeTeller; John T. Radford

== See also ==
- List of Virginia Civil War units
- List of West Virginia Civil War Confederate units
