= James Craig Taylor =

American politician

Attorney General of Virginia
- In office January 19, 1870 – January 1, 1874
- Governor: Gilbert Carlton Walker
- Preceded by: Charles Whittlesey
- Succeeded by: Raleigh Travers Daniel

Member of the Virginia Senate from the Carroll, Floyd, Grayson, Montgomery and Pulaski Counties district
- In office September 7, 1863 – March 15, 1865
- Preceded by: John Dickenson
- Succeeded by: n/a

Member of the Virginia House of Delegates from the Montgomery district
- In office December 7, 1881 – December 4, 1883
- Preceded by: William M. Ellis
- Succeeded by: William M. Ellis

Personal details
- Born: September 23, 1826 Montgomery County, Virginia
- Died: September 24, 1874 (aged 60) Christiansburg, Virginia
- Party: Conservative
- Spouse: Catherine Rebecca Wade
- Occupation: lawyer

Military service
- Allegiance: Virginia; Confederate States
- Branch/service: Virginia Militia; Confederate States Army
- Rank: Major (CSA)
- Unit: 54th Virginia Infantry
- Battles/wars: American Civil War; Battle of Middle Creek

James Craig Taylor (September 23, 1826 – October 25, 1887) was a Virginia lawyer, newspaper publisher and politician who became the Attorney General of Virginia as Congressional Reconstruction ended. After serving in the Confederate States Army and the Virginia Senate (1863–1865), James C. Taylor won the first statewide postwar election on July 6, 1869, defeating Thomas R. Bowden who had won election four years earlier when many former Confederates were precluded from voting, or chose not to vote. Taylor later won election to the Virginia House of Delegates and served part-time for one term before losing to the man he had defeated.

== Early and family life ==
The second son born to the former Mary Montgomery Craig (c.1795 – c.1872) and her husband Creede Taylor (who moved to Montgomery County from Bedford County about 1814) received his first name to honor his maternal grandfather, who had donated 175 acres of his property (once known as Hans Meadow) to establish the town of Christiansburg in 1792. This James C. Taylor had seven siblings, including elder brother George (b. 1825), younger sisters Ann (b. 1830) and Malinda (1836–1906), and younger brothers Creed Jr., John Locke and Robert discussed below.

James C. Taylor received a private education, then read law with Preston & Staples in Christiansburg.

James Craig Taylor married fellow Montgomery County native Catherine Rebecca Wade (1832–1893) on December 23, 1851. They had eight children.

== Career ==
Admitted to the Virginia bar in October, 1850, James Craig Taylor established a private legal practice in Christiansburg, and would ultimately practice before Virginia courts at various levels, as well as federal courts. He also published a newspaper in Christiansburg, The Star, which until 1860 competed with the Whig-leaning Montgomery Messenger (later the Montgomery Herald) edited by Robert C. Trigg. In 1860, attorney James C. Taylor owned $2,500 in real estate and $4000 in personal property (which included a 30-year-old female slave); he also was training John L. Taylor to become a lawyer.

Before becoming a lawyer and publisher, James Craig Taylor and his elder brother George (b. 1825) both volunteered and served in the Mexican–American War (1848–1849), and later both became Confederate officers during the American Civil War. On April 22, 1861, upon hearing the news that Virginia had seceded, Montgomery County citizens raised $10,000 to support the Confederate war effort and entrusted it to James C. Taylor, who invested it in county bonds. The local County Court authorized issuance of additional bonds, and also named Taylor the county treasurer. Taylor soon raised a company (C in the 54th Virginia Infantry), and became its captain on September 10, 1861, later fighting in the Battle of Middle Creek in Kentucky and earning a promotion to Major on May 13, 1862. He was mustered out on September 20, 1862. All five of the Taylor brothers would fight for the Confederacy and only Creed Taylor Jr. (b. 1832 who died in a postwar duel or accident) failed to receive an officer's commission. Younger brother John Locke Taylor (1835–1911) was wounded at the Second Battle of Manassas, and his brother Robert Taylor (1838–1862) died at the Battle of Malvern Hill.

In 1863, voters in Carroll, Floyd, Grayson, Montgomery and Pulaski Counties elected Taylor to represent them in the Virginia Senate, which he did until the Commonwealth's surrender. Taylor replaced John Calhoun Dickenson, a planter and merchant who had represented Grayson County in the Virginia General Assembly since 1853.

After the war (and removal of his officeholding disabilities), Craig ran for Attorney General of Virginia on the same combined ticket as gubernatorial candidate Gilbert C. Walker, who was acceptable to both True Republicans (moderates) and the Committee of Nine, which later became the Virginia Conservative Party. On July 6, 1869, Virginia voters adopted the proposed new Constitution (minus the two clauses disenfranchising former Confederates) and James C. Taylor won 119,446 votes for Attorney General to Thomas R. Bowden's 101,029 votes, about the same majority and margin as Walker's. John F. Lewis completed (or led) the sweep over the Radical Republican ticket, winning election as lieutenant governor by defeating African American Republican J.D. Harriss 120,068 to 99,4000 votes;

After the November general elections and as the U.S. House considered a bill to readmit Virginia to the Union, General Canby removed Charles Whittlesey, whom he had appointed Attorney General in September, on January 19, and appointed Taylor in his place so that his service could begin slightly earlier. The U.S. House passed a bill re-admitting Virginia to the Union on January 21, which President Grant signed and enacted into law on January 26, 1870, thus ending Congressional Reconstruction in what had been Military District No. 1.

As attorney general, Taylor became involved in what became a decades-long controversy over funding of Virginia's prewar debt, as well as the public schools established by the new 1869 Constitution. He represented the Richmond sheriff, who refused to accept matured interest coupons in partial payment of real estate taxes in a mandamus action before the Supreme Court of Appeals (later the Virginia Supreme Court). The second-post-Reconstruction General Assembly had in the Funding Act of 1871 attempted to repeal the favored tax status accorded bonds issued to repay post-war debt, but in the first decision, only his mentor and Christiansburg attorney turned justice Walter Redd Staples supported the readjustment in his dissent, which argued the new bondholders had not given up anything of value (the bonds being worthless after the war because the underlying railroads and other improvements had been destroyed) and that the new state Constitution required fines paid into the old Literary Fund be expended solely for the benefit of the public schools rather than bondholders. However, on December 17, 1873, in Wise Bros &c v. Rogers, the justices found the 1872act a constitutionally permissible change to the 1871 act.

Taylor then resumed his private legal practice and also taught at the Montgomery Male Academy (1880), as well as sat on the board of trustees for the Montgomery Female Academy (1875,1876, 1877, 1878, 1883, and 1884).

Montgomery County voters elected Taylor to represent them in the Virginia House of Delegates in 1883–1885. He thus temporarily unseated William M. Ellis.

== Death and legacy ==
James C. Taylor died in Christiansburg on October 25, 1887, and was buried in Christainsburg's Sunset Cemetery, which he had helped charter in 1879.
