= Christopher Thomas =

American politician (1818–1879)

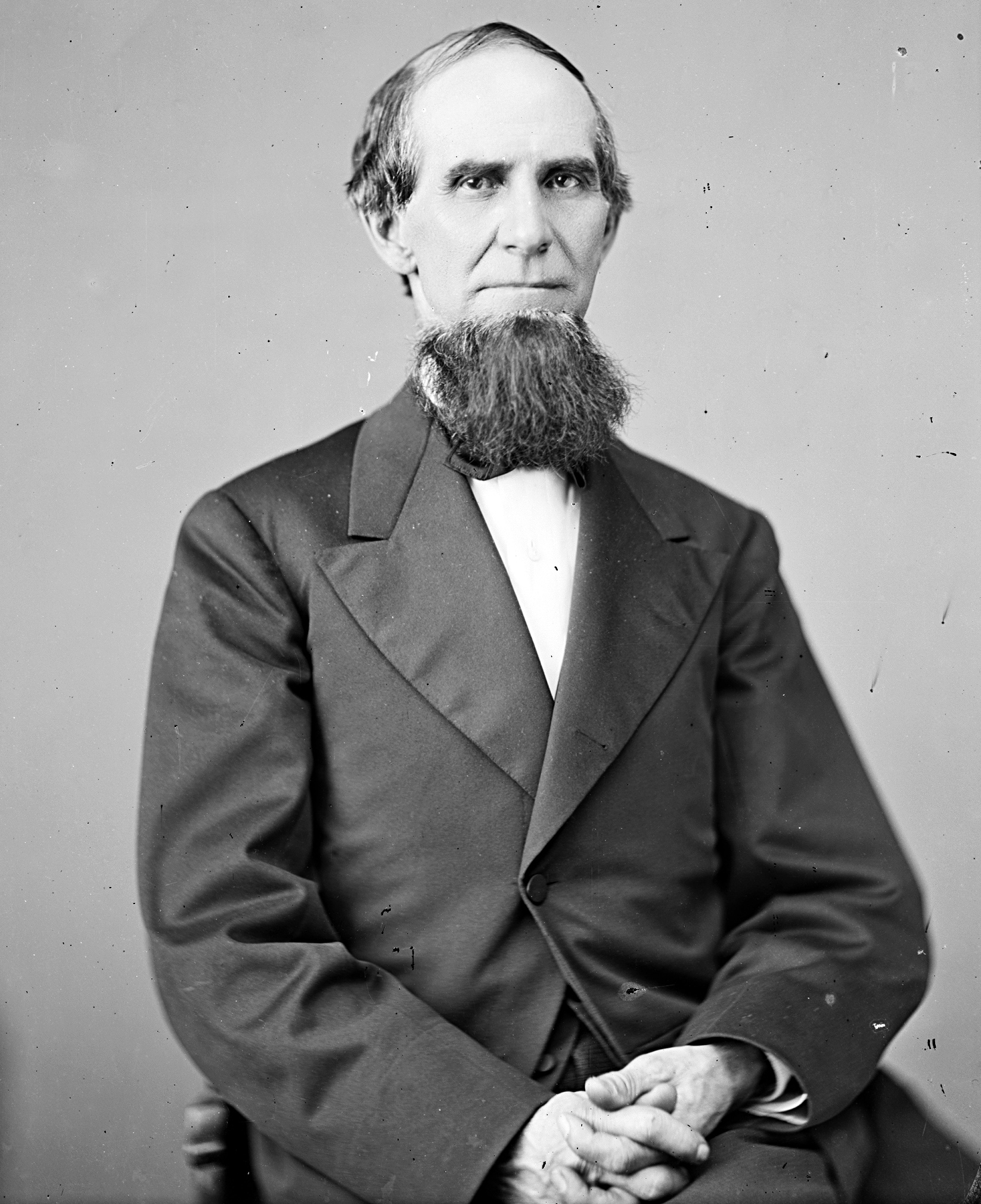

Member of the U.S. House of Representatives from Virginia's 5th district
- In office March 5, 1874 – March 3, 1875
- Preceded by: Alexander Davis
- Succeeded by: George Cabell

Member of the Virginia House of Delegates from Henry County
- In office 1869–1871
- Preceded by: George W. Booker
- Succeeded by: George W. Booker

Member of the Virginia Senate from Henry, Patrick and Franklin Counties
- In office 1860–1863
- Preceded by: George Hairston
- Succeeded by: Peter Saunders

Personal details
- Born: March 24, 1818 Pittsylvania County, Virginia
- Died: February 11, 1879 (aged 60) Martinsville, Virginia
- Resting place: Leatherwood, Virginia
- Party: Republican
- Spouse: Mary Ann Reamey
- Children: Faith, Hope, Jane, Susan, Katherine, Archie, Frank, John, Starling
- Profession: lawyer

Christopher Yancy Thomas (March 24, 1818 – February 11, 1879) was a politician and lawyer from Virginia. He served brief terms in the Virginia Senate, Virginia House and U.S. House of Representatives.

== Early and family life ==
Born in Pittsylvania County, Virginia, Thomas attended local schools as a child and went on to graduate from a private academy in 1838.

== Career ==
Thomas read law and was admitted to the bar in 1844, commencing practice in Martinsville, Virginia. He served in the Confederate Virginia Senate from 1860 to 1864 and was member of the commission to settle the boundary line between Virginia and North Carolina.

Thomas also served as prosecuting attorney for Henry County, Virginia (surrounding Martinsville), and in 1867 was elected to serve the Virginia Constitutional Convention of 1868. After approval of the new state Constitution (and rejection of a proposed provision forbidding former Confederates from holding office), Thomas served in the Virginia House of Delegates in 1869, both succeeding fellow Confederate delegate and Conservative George W. Booker and being succeeded by him.

In 1872, Thomas ran as a Republican for the United States House of Representatives for Virginia's 5th district. He ran against former Confederate officer and Conservative Democrat Alexander Davis, who was initially declared the victor, but Thomas contested the result and was seated. However, Thomas served only a single term from 1874 to 1875, losing his reelection bid in 1874 to Democrat George Cabell, another lawyer and former Confederate officer active in railroad promotion.

== Death and legacy ==
Thomas resumed practicing law until his death in Martinsville, Virginia on February 11, 1879. He was interred in the family cemetery on Leatherwood plantation.

U.S. House of Representatives
Preceded by Alexander Davis	Member of the U.S. House of Representatives from Virginia's 5th congressional district 1874–1875	Succeeded by George Cabell
