= Alexander Davis (politician) =

American politician

Alexander M. Davis

Member of the U.S. House of Representatives from Virginia's 5th district
- In office March 4, 1873 – March 5, 1874
- Preceded by: Richard T.W. Duke
- Succeeded by: Christopher Thomas

Member of the Virginia Senate from Grayson, Carroll and Wythe Counties
- In office 1869–1871
- Preceded by: District established
- Succeeded by: Abner W. C. Nowlin

Personal details
- Born: January 17, 1833 Old Mount Airy, Wythe County, Virginia, US
- Died: September 25, 1889 (aged 56) Independence, Virginia, US
- Party: Democratic
- Other political affiliations: Conservative Party of Virginia (1869–1871)
- Spouse: Mary Jane Dickenson Davis (1848 - 1896)
- Education: Emory and Henry College
- Profession: lawyer

Military service
- Allegiance: Confederate States of America
- Branch/service: Confederate Army
- Years of service: 1861–1865
- Rank: Lieutenant colonel
- Unit: 45th Virginia Infantry
- Battles/wars: American Civil War

Alexander Mathews Davis (January 17, 1833 – September 25, 1889) was a nineteenth-century politician and lawyer from Virginia. Davis served for two years in the Virginia Senate and briefly in the U.S. House of Representatives, before his opponent successfully contested the election result.

== Early and family life ==
Born in Old Mount Airy, Virginia, Davis attended the old field schools and was privately tutored as a child. He later attended and graduated from Emory and Henry College, then read law.

He married Mary Jane Dickenson Davis (1848–1896), daughter of Col. John Dickenson of Grayson County (and for whom Dickenson County was named upon its creation in 1880). They would have at least three sons: Albert Conley Davis (1869–1893), Joseph C Davis (1871–1888) and James Garnett Davis (1873–1931).

== Career ==
Admitted to the bar in 1854, Davis began his private legal practice in Wytheville, Virginia, and later moved to Independence, Virginia.

At the outbreak of the Civil War, Davis served in the Confederate Army as captain of Company C of the 45th Regiment, Virginia Infantry in 1861. He earned a promotion to major in 1862 and another to lieutenant colonel in 1864. Captured near the end of the war, he was held prisoner on Johnson's Island in Lake Erie.

After his release, Davis was elected to the Virginia Senate, and served from 1869 to 1871, when he was succeeded by fellow Confederate veteran Abner W. C. Nowlin. The following year Davis ran as a Democrat for the United States House of Representatives. He was elected to the U.S. House of Representatives with 50.55% of the vote, defeating Republican Christopher Yancy Thomas. However, Thomas successfully contested the result and was seated in March 1874. Afterward, Davis resumed practicing law in Independence, Virginia

== Death and legacy ==
Davis died in Independence on September 25, 1889. Some of his family's papers are held in the special collections at the College of William and Mary.

U.S. House of Representatives
Preceded by Richard T. W. Duke	Member of the U.S. House of Representatives from Virginia's 5th congressional district 1873–1874	Succeeded by Christopher Thomas
