= Conservative Party of Virginia =

Conservative Party of Virginia may refer to:

- Conservative Party of Virginia (1867)
- Conservative Party of Virginia (1965)
