= Richard T. W. Duke =

American politician

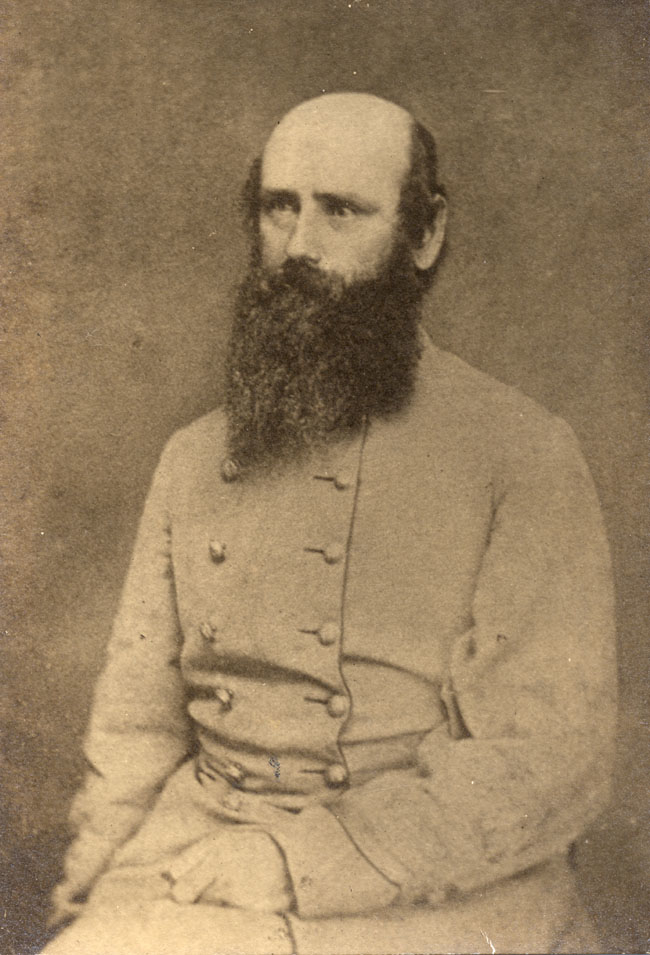

Member of the Virginia House of Delegates from Albemarle County
- In office December 3, 1879 – December 7, 1881 Serving with T. L. Michie
- Succeeded by: John B. Moon

Member of the U.S. House of Representatives from Virginia's 5th district
- In office November 8, 1870 – March 3, 1873
- Preceded by: Robert Ridgway
- Succeeded by: Alexander Davis

Personal details
- Born: June 6, 1822 Charlottesville, Virginia
- Died: July 2, 1898 (aged 76) "Sunny Side," Charlottesville, Virginia
- Resting place: Maplewood Cemetery, Charlottesville, Virginia
- Party: Conservative
- Other political affiliations: Funder (in 1880s)
- Profession: lawyer

Military service
- Allegiance: Confederate States of America
- Branch/service: Confederate States Army
- Rank: Colonel
- Unit: 46th Virginia Infantry
- Battles/wars: American Civil War

Richard Thomas Walker Duke Sr. (June 6, 1822 – July 2, 1898) was a nineteenth-century congressman and lawyer from Virginia.

== Early and family life ==
Born near Charlottesville, Virginia, to Elizabeth Morris Kendrick (August 23, 1802, in Lancaster, Pennsylvania - October 6, 1869, in Richmond, Virginia) and her planter husband Francis Edward Duke (November 29, 1783, in Berkeley, Virginia - November 8, 1836, in Harpers Ferry, West Virginia). Duke received a private education suitable to his class, then following his father's death, was sent to Lexington, Virginia, for higher studies. He graduated from the Virginia Military Institute in 1844, then studied law in Charlottesville and received a degree from the law department of the University of Virginia in 1850.

== Career ==
Following his admission to the Virginia bar later that year, Duke began his private legal practice. The Virginia General Assembly amended Charlottesville's town charter in March 1851, and three years later Duke was elected one of the town's four aldermen (with Andrew J. Brown, John B. Dodd and William Kebinger), and Drury Wood became mayor.

Duke also helped operate his family's plantation using enslaved labor. In 1858 Duke won his first election, and became the Commonwealth's Attorney for Albemarle County, Virginia, where he would be re-elected even during the American Civil War and served until 1869.

In November, 1859, following the unsuccessful raid on Harper's Ferry, and Brown's trial, Duke organized the Albemarle Rifles at Charlottesville. After Virginia voted to secede near the outbreak of the Civil War, Duke enlisted on May 8, 1861. He and his company were mustered into service as Company B of the 19th Virginia Infantry. They fought at the First Battle of Manassas, and Duke received a favorable mention in the battle report although his company followed orders to hold the ford, and suffered few casualties. However, Duke also was sick in Charlottesville for most of August and September 1861, and his Company B and Captain Peyton's Company E, on picket duty in a swamp during the Peninsular Campaign, were driven back on April 26, 1862, and later replaced by Mississippi regiment. Thus, when the 19th Virginia regiment was reorganized in April 1862, Duke failed to win re-election as captain.

In May 1862, the 46th Virginia Infantry (which included three companies from Albemarle County as well as two companies of the storied Richmond Light Infantry Blues among its nine companies), reorganized after having lost the Battle of Roanoke Island in January 1862 as well as many men due to enlistment expiration and diseases including measles and typhoid fever. The 46th's troops refused to re-elect Lt. Col. Richardson (who then transferred and became a major in the 39th Virginia Infantry), and instead elected Duke (who had expected to return to Albemarle and his law practice) as Colonel of 46th Virginia. While the 19th Virginia remained in Pickett's Brigade, Duke and his new troops men were in Wise's Brigade, under former Virginia Governor, now General Henry A. Wise. Although their Brigade participated somewhat in the Seven Days Battles which saved Richmond in the summer of 1862, it mainly dealt with false alarms about Union troop movements on the James River and for the next 16 months, remained stuck on the Peninsula as a counterforce to the Union presence at Norfolk and Fortress Monroe. Col. Walker would remain in that rank until he resigned in March, 1864, following quarrels with his commander, General Wise.

In May, 1864, Duke accepted a commission as Lieutenant Colonel and received command of the 1st Virginia Reserves Battalion. That unit defended Richmond in the conflict's final year, including during the Appomattox Campaign. As the summer 1864 ended Duke marched the Albemarle County Reserves to Richmond, where they were organized together with companies from Fluvanna, Greene, Louisa, Orange and Madison Counties as that Battalion, and then assigned to guard prisoners at Belle Isle, as well as train. In late September 1864, they were sent to man trenches at Fort Harrison, then retreated to new lines at Chaffin's Bluff before returning to Richmond to guard Libby Prison. During the Confederate evacuation of the capitol on April 3, 1865, per orders, they helped set public warehouses afire. Lt.Col. Duke was captured with his many of his troops at the Battle of Sailor's Creek, with officers being sent to the Old Capitol Prison (and ordinary troops eventually to Point Lookout, Maryland).

After being released from prison in July, 1865, Duke returned to Charlottesville and helped organize a local citizen group to prevent "black domination." He also resumed farming, as well as his law practice in Albemarle county and surrounding areas. Following Virginia's acceptance of a new state Constitution in 1869 (and defeat of a provision which would have prevented former Confederates from holding office) and readmission to the United States, fellow Conservative Robert Ridgway was elected to United States House of Representatives, but soon died. Duke won the special and uncontested election to replace Ridgway. In 1870, he won a contested election, running as a Conservative against fellow Albemarle county planter and lawyer Alexander Rives, a Republican who courteously and without his normal charge secured a pardon for Duke in order to remove any taint of civil disability. Rives was soon appointed and confirmed as U.S. District Judge for the Western District of Virginia.

Fellow Confederate veteran Alexander Davis, running as a Democrat, replaced Congressman Duke in 1873. Albemarle County voters would again elect Duke to the Virginia House of Delegates in 1879 and 1880.

In his retirement, about 1899, Duke began writing his reminiscences of Charlottesville and Albemarle County for his five children and eventually grandchildren. Over the next two decades (ending months before his death), they eventually reached five bound volumes, and are held by the University of Virginia library.

== Death and legacy ==
Duke died at his estate called "Sunny Side" near Charlottesville, Virginia, on July 2, 1898, and was interred in Maplewood Cemetery in Charlottesville. The University of Virginia library holds his family's papers.

== Electoral history ==
1870 - Duke was elected to the U.S. House of Representatives unopposed in a special election and was concurrently elected in the general election unopposed.

U.S. House of Representatives
Preceded by Robert Ridgway	Member of the U.S. House of Representatives from Virginia's 5th congressional district 1870–1873	Succeeded by Alexander Davis
