= Abner W. C. Nowlin =

American politician (1833–1906)

Member of the Virginia Senate from the Grayson, Carroll and Wythe Counties district
- In office December 6, 1871 – November 30, 1875
- Preceded by: Alexander Davis
- Succeeded by: John Calhoun Dickenson

Personal details
- Born: October 11, 1833 Carroll County, Virginia, US
- Died: March 7, 1906 (aged 72) Washington, D.C., US
- Spouse(s): Eugenia Adelaid Terry; Louisa Nivilson Watkins
- Children: 3
- Education: College of William and Mary
- Profession: Lawyer

Military service
- Allegiance: Confederate States of America
- Branch/service: Confederate Army
- Years of service: 1861–1863
- Rank: Captain
- Unit: 24th Virginia Infantry
- Battles/wars: American Civil War

Abner Wentworth Clopton Nowlin (October 11, 1833 – March 7, 1906) was a farmer, Confederate officer, politician, editor and lawyer who spent the final years of his life assisting fellow veterans and others at the Central Union Mission in Washington, D.C.

== Early and family life ==
Born on October 11, 1833, in Carroll County, Virginia, to merchant Bryan Ward Nowlin (1796–1860) and his wife the former Martha Clopton, Abner Nowlin received a private education. By 1850, his father farmed in nearby Henry County, Virginia with the help of Abner and his other sons: Thomas Nowlin (born 1832), John B. W Nowlin (1836–1911) and David Nowlin (1839–1896). His family may have owned enslaved persons by 1850.

Abner Nowlin received a private education, then graduated from the College of William and Mary in 1855, and read law. His paternal ancestors, three O'Nolan brothers (James, John and William Nowlan), emigrated from Ireland in the 18th century and helped settle southwest Virginia, changing the spelling of the family name to "Nowlin."

He married Eugenia Adelaid Terry of Pittsylvania County on September 10, 1855, in Halifax County, but she died on December 6, 1859. The widower remarried, to Louisa N. Nowlin and raised her son Ernest; they also had daughters Lelia (born 1865) and Ruby (1866–1953). Ruby was blind, and spent most of her adult life at a home for the blind in Washington, D.C.

== Career ==
Admitted to the bar, Nowlin began his private legal practice in southwest Virginia. He became assistant editor of the new The Times newspaper in Wytheville in 1856, and the following year was a featured speaker at Fourth of July festivities in the Odd Fellows lodge, but left town by 1858.

His father died of pneumonia in March 1860, as Virginia contemplated secession. As the Civil War began, Nowlin enlisted as a private in what became the 24th Virginia Infantry of the Confederate Army in Lynchburg on May 24, 1861. He earned a promotion to full captain on May 10, 1862, before resigning and mustering out on March 23, 1863. Nowlin became a tax collector for Virginia's 59th district for the remainder of the war. His brother John B. W. Nowlin also served in the Confederate Army in southwest Virginia and into Tennessee, and later established a residence and practice in Nashville.

After receiving a pardon, Nowlin resumed practicing law and also farmed 380 acres in western Campbell County. The first postwar Virginia General Assembly elected Nowlin a judge. In 1871 voters elected Abner Nowlin to the Virginia Senate, where he served until 1875, when he was succeeded by fellow Confederate veteran John Calhoun Dickenson.

By 1879, Nowlin and his family lived in Washington D.C., where he worked at 4 I Street N.W. and at some time edited the Richmond Whig. Over the following years, Nowlin listed himself in various city directories as an assistant postmaster (1880), journalist, real estate lawyer and editor. He was listed as a copyholder public printer for Virginia in Washington D.C. in 1891. In the 1900 census, after his wife's death and their daughter Lila's marriage, Nowlin was listed both as a lawyer and as the assistant superintendent of the Central Union Mission (founded in 1884 and D.C.'s oldest social service agency). At the Central Union Mission, he was commonly addressed by the honorific "judge".

== Death and legacy ==
Judge Nowlin died on March 7, 1906, aged 72, of injuries received several days earlier in a tussle as he evicted Leo Fitzgerald from the boardinghouse. A petition he signed urging amnesty be granted to Confederate veterans is held in the special collections division at Virginia Tech in Blacksburg, Virginia.
