= List of United States senators in the 41st Congress =

This is a complete list of United States senators during the 41st United States Congress listed by seniority from March 4, 1869, to March 3, 1871.

Order of service is based on the commencement of the senator's first term. Behind this is former service as a senator (only giving the senator seniority within their new incoming class), service as vice president, a House member, a cabinet secretary, or a governor of a state. The final factor is the population of the senator's state.

Senators who were sworn in during the middle of the congress (up until the last senator who was not sworn in early after winning the November 1870 election) are listed at the end of the list with no number.

== Terms of service ==
Class	Terms of service of senators that expired in years
Class 2	Terms of service of senators that expired in 1871 (AL, AR, DE, GA, IA, IL, KS, KY, LA, MA, ME, MI, MN, MS, NC, NE, NH, NJ, OR, RI, SC, TN, TX, VA, and WV.)
Class 3	Terms of service of senators that expired in 1873 (AL, AR, CA, CT, FL, GA, IA, IL, IN, KS, KY, LA, MD, MO, NC, NH, NV, NY, OH, OR, PA, SC, VT, and WI.)
Class 1	Terms of service of senators that expired in 1875 (CA, CT, DE, FL, IN, MA, MD, ME, MI, MN, MO, MS, NE, NJ, NV, NY, OH, PA, RI, TN, TX, VA, VT, WI, and WV.)

== U.S. Senate seniority list ==
U.S. Senate seniority
Rank	Senator (party-state)	Seniority date	Other factors
1	Charles Sumner (LR-MA)	April 11, 1851	
2	Henry Wilson (R-MA)	January 31, 1855	
3	Lyman Trumbull (R-IL)	March 4, 1855	
4	Zachariah Chandler (R-MI)	March 4, 1857	
5	Henry B. Anthony (R-RI)	March 4, 1859	Former governor
6	Willard Saulsbury, Sr. (D-DE)	March 4, 1859	
7	James W. Grimes (R-IA)	March 4, 1859	
8	Timothy O. Howe (R-WI)	March 4, 1861	
9	John Sherman (R-OH)	March 21, 1861	
10	Samuel C. Pomeroy (R-KS)	April 4, 1861	
11	Garrett Davis (D-KY)	December 23, 1861	
12	Jacob M. Howard (R-MI)	January 17, 1862	
13	Alexander Ramsey (R-MN)	March 4, 1863	
14	William Sprague IV (R-RI)	March 4, 1863	
15	Waitman T. Willey (R-VA)	August 4, 1863	
16	William M. Stewart (R-NV)	February 1, 1865	
17	James W. Nye (R-NV)	February 1, 1865	
18	Aaron H. Cragin (R-NH)	March 4, 1865	
19	Richard Yates (R-IL)	March 4, 1865	
20	William P. Fessenden (R-ME)	March 4, 1865	
21	Daniel S. Norton (R-MN)	March 4, 1865	
22	George H. Williams (R-OR)	March 4, 1865	
23	George F. Edmunds (R-VT)	April 3, 1866	
24	Edmund G. Ross (R-KS)	July 19, 1866	
25	Joseph S. Fowler (R-TN)	July 24, 1866	
26	Alexander G. Cattell (R-NJ)	September 19, 1866	
27	Thomas Tipton (R-NE)	March 1, 1867	
28	John Milton Thayer (R-NE)	March 1, 1867	
29	Roscoe Conkling (R-NY)	March 4, 1867	
30	Justin Smith Morrill (R-VT)	March 4, 1867	
31	Oliver P. Morton (R-IN)	March 4, 1867	
32	Simon Cameron (R-PA)	March 4, 1867	
33	Orris S. Ferry (R-CT)	March 4, 1867	
34	Thomas Tipton (R-NE)	March 4, 1867	
35	Cornelius Cole (R-CA)	March 4, 1867	
36	James Harlan (R-IA)	March 4, 1867	
37	James W. Patterson (R-NH)	March 4, 1867	
38	Henry W. Corbett (R-OR)	March 4, 1867	
39	Charles D. Drake (R-MO)	March 4, 1867	
38	John Milton Thayer (R-NE)	March 4, 1867	
40	Thomas C. McCreery (D-KY)	February 19, 1868	
41	George Vickers (D-MD)	March 7, 1868	
42	Alexander McDonald (R-AR)	June 22, 1868	
43	Benjamin F. Rice (R-AR)	June 23, 1868	
44	Thomas W. Osborn (R-FL)	June 25, 1868	
45	John S. Harris (R-LA)	July 8, 1868	
46	William P. Kellogg (R-LA)	July 9, 1868	
47	George E. Spencer (R-AL)	July 13, 1868	
48	Willard Warner (R-AL)	July 13, 1868	
49	John Pool (R-NC)	July 14, 1868	
50	Joseph Carter Abbott (R-NC)	July 14, 1868	
51	Thomas J. Robertson (R-SC)	July 15, 1868	
52	Frederick A. Sawyer (R-SC)	July 16, 1868	
53	Thomas F. Bayard (D-DE)	March 4, 1869	
54	Hannibal Hamlin (R-ME)	March 4, 1869	
55	Allen G. Thurman (D-OH)	March 4, 1869	
56	Eugene Casserly (D-CA)	March 4, 1869	
57	William A. Buckingham (R-CT)	March 4, 1869	
58	Abijah Gilbert (R-FL)	March 4, 1869	
59	Daniel D. Pratt (R-IN)	March 4, 1869	
60	William T. Hamilton (D-MD)	March 4, 1869	
61	Carl Schurz (R-MO)	March 4, 1869	
62	John P. Stockton (D-NJ)	March 4, 1869	
63	Reuben Fenton (R-NY)	March 4, 1869	
64	John Scott (R-PA)	March 4, 1869	
65	William G. Brownlow (R-TN)	March 4, 1869	
66	Arthur I. Boreman (R-WV)	March 4, 1869	
67	Matthew H. Carpenter (R-WI)	March 4, 1869	
	Lot M. Morrill (R-ME)	October 30, 1869	
	James B. Howell (R-IA)	January 18, 1870	
	John W. Johnston (D-VA)	January 26, 1870	
	John F. Lewis (R-VA)	January 26, 1870	
	Adelbert Ames (R-MS)	February 23, 1870	
	Hiram R. Revels (R-MS)	February 23, 1870	
	James W. Flanagan (R-TX)	March 30, 1870	
	Morgan C. Hamilton (R-TX)	March 31, 1870	
	William Windom (R-MN)	July 15, 1870	
	Daniel T. Jewett (R-MO)	December 19, 1870	
	Francis Preston Blair Jr. (D-MO)	January 20, 1871	
	Ozora P. Stearns (R-MN)	January 22, 1871	
	Joshua Hill (R-GA)	February 1, 1871	
	Homer V. M. Miller (D-GA)	February 24, 1871	

== See also ==
- 41st United States Congress
- List of United States representatives in the 41st Congress
