= John Calhoun Dickenson =

American politician

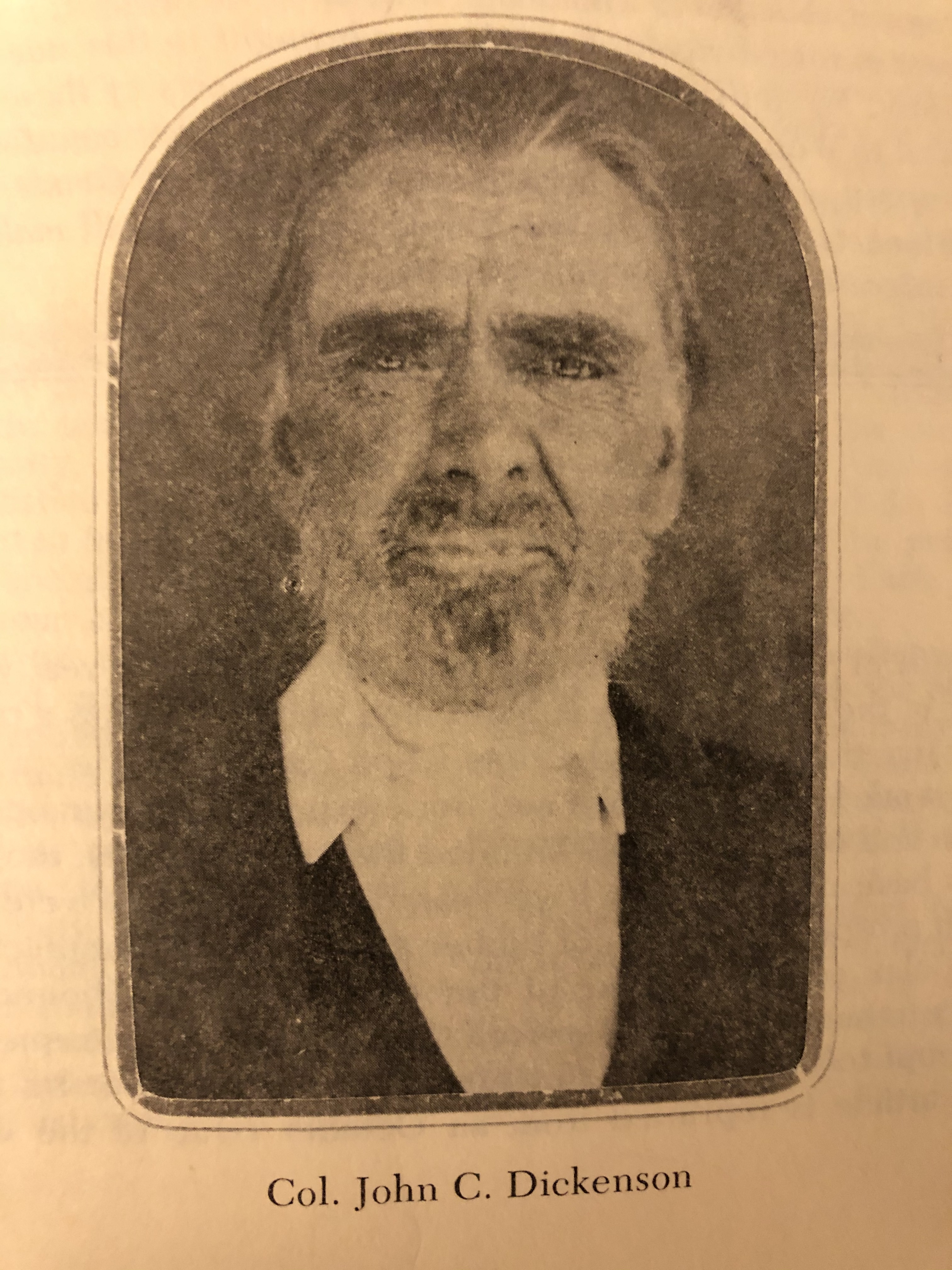

Member of the Virginia House of Delegates from the Grayson county district
- In office December 5, 1853 – December 4, 1859
- Preceded by: William C. Parks
- Succeeded by: Samuel McCamant

Member of the Virginia Senate from the Carroll, Floyd, Grayson, Montgomery and Pulaski Counties district
- In office December 5, 1859 – September 6, 1863
- Preceded by: Harvey Deskins
- Succeeded by: James Craig Taylor

Member of the Virginia Senate from the Carroll, Grayson and Wythe Counties district
- In office December 1, 1875 – December 4, 1883
- Preceded by: Abner W. C. Nowlin
- Succeeded by: Peyton G. Hale

Personal details
- Born: December 4, 1815 Oldtown, Grayson County, Virginia
- Died: July 18, 1890 (aged 74) Grayson County, Virginia
- Party: Democratic
- Spouse(s): Rosamond Bourne Hale, Margaret Ellen Andis
- Children: many
- Occupation: farmer, merchant

Military service
- Allegiance: Virginia; Confederate States
- Branch/service: Virginia Militia
- Rank: Colonel
- Battles/wars: American Civil War

John Calhoun Dickenson (December 4, 1815 - July 18, 1890) was a Virginia planter and politician who served in both chambers of the Virginia General Assembly, including in the Virginia Senate during the American Civil War and after Congressional Reconstruction ended, and is usually referred to with the honorific "Colonel", perhaps alluding to his service with the Home Guard during the American Civil War.

== Early and family life ==
He was born in Old Town in Grayson County, Virginia, to merchant Martin Dickenson (d. 1834) and his wife Mary, who survived her husband by 25 years. He had two brothers and six sisters, and farmed both on Elk Creek and near Oldtown in Grayson County. Martin Dickenson had worked for merchant and Grayson County's first clerk, William Bourne Sr. and served as the county's deputy clerk and later succeeded Bourne as clerk, serving from 1793 until his death in 1834.

John Dickenson married Rosamond Bourne Hale (1816-1854) on October 14, 1839, and they had several children before her death in 1854. Two sons would fight for the Confederacy: William Martin Dickenson (1841-; who was wounded in combat), and James P. Dickenson (1843-; who spent 18 or 20 months in a Yankee prison). They also had daughters Bettie S (b. 1844), Lucy (b. 1845) and Mary (b. 1848) and sons Benjamin Rush Floyd Dickenson (1846-1865) and Thomas Jefferson Dickenson (1849-1913), as well as at least two children who died as infants. After Rosamund's death, J.C. Dickenson remarried in 1856, to Margaret Ellen Andis Dickenson (1835-1887) with whom he raised Sarah (Sallie) Josephine Dickenson Edwards (1857-1929), Robert Lee Dickenson (1862-1936), Sue Blanche Dickenson and John Calhoun Dickenson (1869-1960) to adulthood. Margaret Dickenson also predeceased her husband, dying in October 1887 in Boone County, Indiana, while visiting relatives.

== Career ==
John Dickenson owned a large estate on the New River and also with Ezra Nuckolls operated stores at Old Town, Elk Creek and Bridle Creek, all in Grayson County. The merchants hauled provisions from Lynchburg using the James River Canal as well as wagons. By the 1860 U.S. census, he was one of the county's richest men, with real estate worth $35,500 and personal property (including slaves) worth $28,750.

Grayson County voters elected Col. John C. Dickenson to be their clerk in 1849 and he was re-elected numerous times until resigning after 11 years. After serving (part-time) as a legislator for 14 years (8 of them in the Virginia Senate), Dickenson also served as Magistrate and as chairman of Grayson county. He was a Democrat, casting his first vote in 1836.

Grayson County voters elected Dickenson to represent them in the Virginia House of Delegates in 1853 and re-elected him twice. In 1859 Samuel McCamant replaced him in the lower house, as voters in Carroll, Floyd, Grayson, Montgomery and Pulaski Counties elected John Dickenson to the Virginia Senate (where he replaced Harvey Deskins). Although too old to serve in the military during the American Civil War, two of his sons fought for the Confederacy. Dickenson later estimated that he gave $20,000 to Confederate soldiers' families during that conflict, plus lost about $50,000 in livestock and meat to support troops as well as "lost about 40 likely Negroes by Lincoln's free proclamation." In 1863, voters elected Confederate veteran James Craig Taylor to replace Dickenson in the Virginia Senate until the Commonwealth surrendered.

Voters from Carroll, Grayson and Wythe Counties returned Dickenson to the State Senate in 1874, where he replaced Confederate veteran Abner W. C. Nowlin. Dickenson was re-elected in 1877, but replaced in the Senate beginning in 1879 by Peyton G. Hale.

== Death and legacy ==
Dickenson later attributed his success in life to the industry and energy he put into it. He died in Grayson County on July 17, 1890, and was buried in the family graveyard in what is now Riverside, Virginia. Dickenson County, Virginia, formed in 1880, was supposedly named after his relative William J. Dickenson who represented Buchanon, Russell and Wise Counties during the American Civil War.
