= William Henry Harrison Stowell =

American politician (1840–1922)

William H. H. Stowell
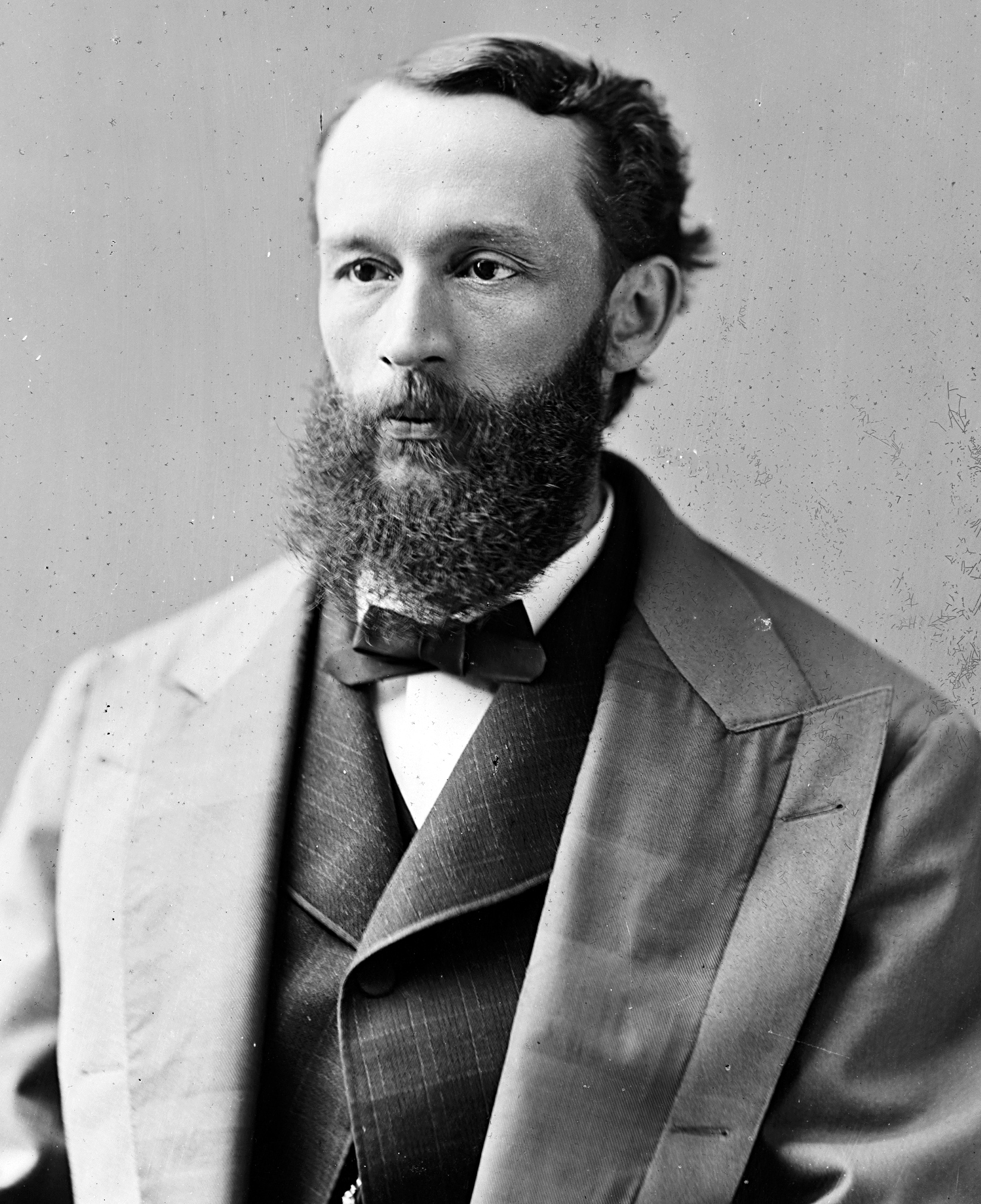

Member of the U.S. House of Representatives from Virginia's 4th district
- In office March 4, 1871 – March 3, 1877
- Preceded by: George W. Booker
- Succeeded by: Joseph Jorgensen

Chair of the Republican Party of Virginia
- In office April 19, 1872 – July 31, 1873
- Preceded by: John F. Lewis
- Succeeded by: Richard Henry Carter

Personal details
- Born: July 26, 1840 Windsor, Vermont, U.S.
- Died: April 27, 1922 (aged 81) Amherst, Massachusetts, U.S.
- Resting place: Woodlawn Cemetery, New York City
- Party: Republican
- Profession: businessman, politician, journalist

William Henry Harrison Stowell (July 26, 1840 – April 27, 1922) was a 19th-century congressman, merchant and industrialist from Virginia, Vermont, Massachusetts, Wisconsin and Minnesota.

== Biography ==
Born in Windsor, Vermont, Stowell attended public schools in Boston, Massachusetts, as a child and graduated from Boston Latin School in 1860. He engaged in mercantile pursuits before moving to Virginia in 1865 and became collector of internal revenue for the fourth district in 1869. Stowell was elected a Republican to the United States House of Representatives in 1870, serving from 1871 to 1877 and was a delegate to the Republican National Convention in 1876. Simultaneously, he served as the chairman of the state Republican Party from 1872 to 1873. He moved to Appleton, Wisconsin, in 1880 and engaged in paper manufacturing and later moved to Duluth, Minnesota, in 1886 and engaging in paper and steel manufacturing. Stowell was president of the Manufacturers Bank of West Duluth from 1889 to 1895 and was a correspondent in Paris, France, for various newspapers. He moved to Amherst, Massachusetts in 1914, where he died on April 27, 1922. Stowell was interred in Woodlawn Cemetery in New York City.

== Electoral history ==
- 1870; Stowell was elected to the U.S. House of Representatives unopposed.
- 1872; Stowell was re-elected with 65.61% of the vote, defeating Conservative Phillip Watkins McKinney.
- 1874; Stowell was re-elected with 63.9% of the vote, defeating Democrat William Hodges Mann and Independent C.H. Porter.

U.S. House of Representatives
Preceded by George Booker	Member of the U.S. House of Representatives from Virginia's 4th congressional district 1871–1877	Succeeded by Joseph Jorgensen
