= 46th Virginia Infantry Regiment =

- Flag of Virginia, 1861
- Active: August 1861 – April 1865
- Disbanded: April 1865
- Country: Confederacy
- Allegiance: Confederate States of America
- Branch: Confederate States Army
- Type: Infantry
- Engagements: American Civil War: Battle of Roanoke Island; Seven Days' Battles; Siege of Charleston Harbor; Battle of Cold Harbor; Siege of Petersburg; Appomattox Campaign

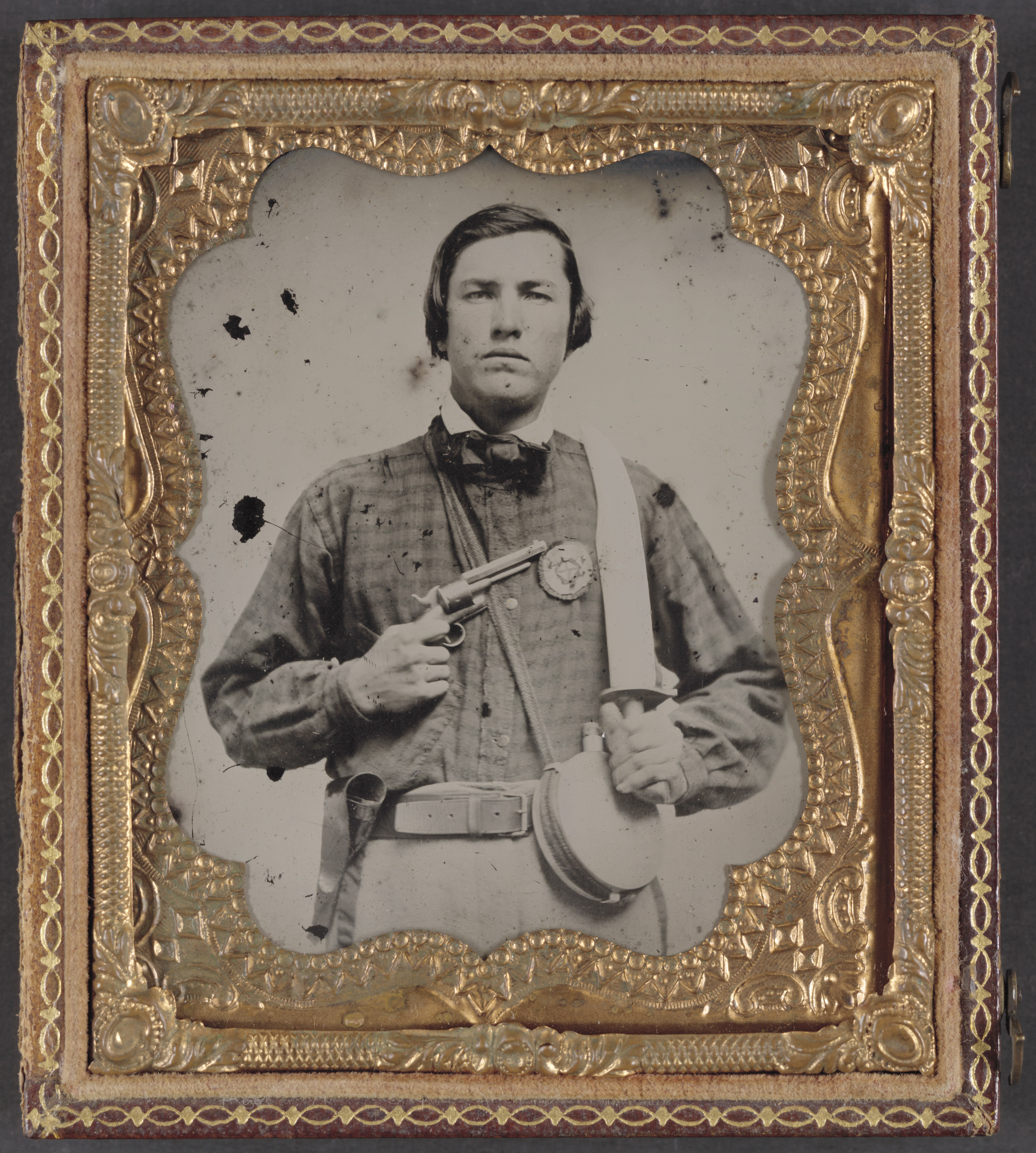
Private David C. Colbert of Company C, 46th Virginia Infantry Regiment

The 46th Virginia Infantry Regiment was an infantry regiment raised in Virginia for service in the Confederate States Army during the American Civil War. It fought mostly in Virginia and the Carolinas.

46th Infantry Regiment (also called 1st or 2nd Regiment, Wise Legion) was organized in August, 1861.

It was soon ordered to North Carolina and placed in a brigade commanded by former governor Henry A. Wise. After Wise fell severely ill with pleurisy (and was confined to bed for a week), Federal forces captured Roanoke Island. Although only 23 Confederates died in the 2-day battle before Wise's second in command surrendered, those dead included Wise's eldest son Capt. Obediah Jennings Wise (editor of the Richmond Enquirer before the war and whose funeral at St. James Church in Richmond would be the capitol's most elaborate before that of Stonewall Jackson the following year) and Roberts Coles (son of former Illinois Territorial Governor and abolitionist Edward Coles).

Following a prisoner exchange, as well as additional soldiers being added to replace those who failed to re-enlist and those lost through disease and to a lesser extent, battle casualties, the unit reassembled in Virginia, saw some action in the Seven Days' Battles in June 1862. This unit contained 401 effectives during the Seven Days' Battles. Afterward, it remained in Virginia and mainly dealt with false alarms about Union troop movements on the James River, then for the next 16 months, remained stuck on the Peninsula as a counterforce to the Union presence at Norfolk and Fortress Monroe. Then, the 46th Virginia was reassigned to the Department of South Carolina, Georgia, and Florida. It defended besieged Charleston, before returning to Virginia during the spring of 1864. It then endured the hardships of the lengthy Petersburg trenches north of the James River and helped set the Confederate capitol afire per orders as the CSA army evacuated. During the final Appomattox Campaign, many officers and men were captured during the Battle at Sailor's Creek. Fifteen officers and 116 men surrendered on April 9, 1865, at Appomattox.

The field officers were Colonels J. Lucius Davis, Richard T. W. Duke, Randolph Harrison, and John H. Richardson; Lieutenant Colonel Peyton Wise; and Majors Hugh W. Fry Jr. and James C. Hill.

== See also ==
- List of Virginia Civil War units
