= 54th Virginia Infantry Regiment =

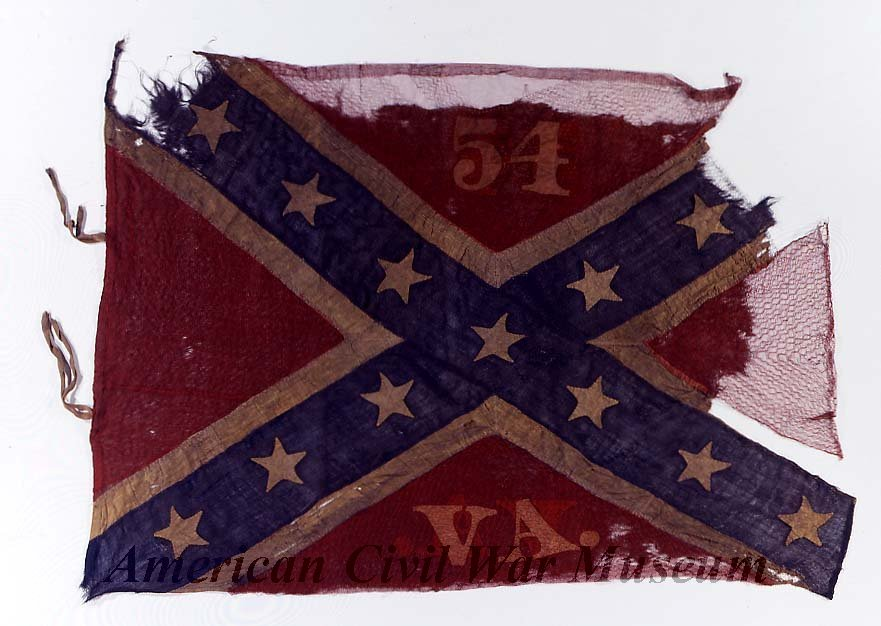
- Battle Flag of the 54th Virginia Infantry
- Active: October 1861 – April 9, 1865
- Country: Confederacy
- Allegiance: Confederate States of America
- Branch: Confederate States Army
- Type: Infantry
- Engagements: American Civil War: Battle of Middle Creek; Battle of Chickamauga; Atlanta campaign

Commanders
- Notable commanders: Lt col. Henry A. Edmundson

The 54th Virginia Infantry Regiment was an infantry regiment raised in Virginia for service in the Confederate States Army during the American Civil War. It fought mostly with the Army of Tennessee.

54th Infantry Regiment was organized in October 1861. It was soon ordered to Kentucky and took an active part in the engagement at Middle Creek. Later the unit was assigned to Trigg's, Reynolds', Brown's and Reynolds' Consolidated, and Palmer's Brigade, Army of Tennessee.

It participated in many battles of the army from Chickamauga to Atlanta, endured Hood's winter operations, and fought in North Carolina. On April 9, 1865, it merged into the 54th Virginia Infantry Battalion.

This regiment sustained 47 casualties at Chickamauga, totalled 390 men and 329 arms in December, 1863, and had 128 present in December 1864 and 212 in January 1865.

The field officers were Colonel Robert C. Trigg; Lieutenant Colonels Henry A. Edmundson, William B. Shelor, and John J. Wade; and Majors John S. Deyerle, Austin Harman, and James C. Taylor.

By 1864, the influence of peace party and pro-Union organizations, particularly the Red Strings, into the 22nd Virginia Infantry and the 54th Virginia Infantry was unknown. Secretary of War James Seddon investigated the allegations.

== See also ==
- List of Virginia Civil War units

== Bibliography ==
- 54th Virginia Infantry Roster. n.d.
- Floyd County (Virginia). Clerk of the Circuit Court. Muster Rolls of Floyd County, 1861-1865. Richmond [Virginia]: Virginia State Library, 1980. Contents: Contains rolls for Company A, 24th Regiment; Company B, 42nd Virginia Infantry; Company A, 54th Va. Infantry; Company B, 54th Va. Regt. Infantry; Company D, 54th Va. Infantry; Company H, 54th Va. Infantry; Company I, 54th Va. Infantry; Company G, 21st Va. Cavalry; Col. R.L. Preston's Reserves, Capt J.B. Headens Co.; Col. R.L. Preston's Reserves, Capt. A.J. Graham Co.; Veterans who served with Stuarts Horse Artillery; Company E, 27th Battalion; Company H, 51st Va. Infantry; Company F, 14th Va. Cav.; Clarks Battalion, 30th Va.; Soldiers who served in various commands and whose companies were not organized in Floyd County; Soldiers from Floyd County who served in Confederate Service and whose commands are unknown; and Soldiers who were wounded, killed or died in action or deceased.
- Robertson, James I. 2012. "A Floyd County Family in Wartime: The Civil War Letters of Lorenzo and Barbara Hylton". Smithfield Review: Studies in the History of the Region West of the Blue Ridge. 16: 27–44.
- Weaver, Jeffrey C., and G. L. Sherwood. 54th Virginia Infantry. Lynchburg, Va: H.E. Howard, 1993.
