= Posey G. Lester =

American politician (1850–1929)

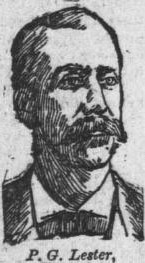

Member of the U.S. House of Representatives from Virginia's 5th district
- In office March 4, 1889 – March 3, 1893
- Preceded by: John R. Brown
- Succeeded by: Claude A. Swanson

Personal details
- Born: March 12, 1850 Floyd, Virginia
- Died: February 9, 1929 (aged 78) Roanoke, Virginia
- Party: Democratic
- Profession: Minister, newspaper editor

Posey Green Lester (March 12, 1850 – February 9, 1929) was a U.S. representative from Virginia.

== Biography ==
Born near the town of Floyd, Virginia, Lester attended the common schools and the Jacksonville graded school at Floyd. He engaged in teaching in Floyd County, Virginia. Ordained a minister in the primitive or old-school Baptist Church in 1876. He became associate editor of Zion's Landmark, a church paper published at Wilson, North Carolina, in 1883, and editor in chief in 1920.

Lester was elected as a Democrat to the Fifty-first and Fifty-second Congresses (March 4, 1889 – March 3, 1893). He was not a candidate for renomination in 1892. He resumed his ministerial duties in Floyd, until 1921, when he moved to Roanoke, Virginia, and served as pastor of the Primitive Baptist Church until his death in that city on February 9, 1929. He was interred in Evergreen Cemetery.

== Electoral history ==
- 1888; Lester was elected to the U.S. House of Representatives with 52.5% of the vote, defeating Republican John D. Blackwell.
- 1890; Lester was re-elected with 82.07% of the vote, defeating Independents S. C. Adams and J. Ring.

== Sources ==
- United States Congress. "Posey G. Lester (id: L000254)". Biographical Directory of the United States Congress.

U.S. House of Representatives
Preceded by John R. Brown	Member of the U.S. House of Representatives from Virginia's 5th congressional district 1889–1893	Succeeded by Claude A. Swanson
