= John Robert Brown (Virginia politician) =

American politician

Member of the U.S. House of Representatives from Virginia's 5th district
- In office March 4, 1887 – March 3, 1889
- Preceded by: George Cabell
- Succeeded by: Posey G. Lester

Personal details
- Born: January 14, 1842 Franklin County, Virginia
- Died: August 4, 1927 (aged 85) Martinsville, Virginia
- Party: Republican
- Profession: tobacco farmer, politician

Military service
- Allegiance: Confederate States of America
- Branch/service: Confederate States Army
- Unit: 44th Virginia Infantry Regiment
- Battles/wars: American Civil War

John Robert Brown (January 14, 1842 – August 4, 1927) was a United States representative from Virginia.

== Biography ==
Born near Snow Creek, Franklin County, Virginia, he attended private schools in Franklin and Henry Counties and entered the Confederate Army in 1861 as a private in Company D, Twenty-fourth Regiment of Virginia Volunteers. In 1870 he formed a partnership with his father in the tobacco business at Shady Grove; he moved to Martinsville, Virginia in 1882 and continued in the tobacco business. He also engaged in banking and was mayor of Martinsville from 1884 to 1888.

Brown was elected as a Republican to the Fiftieth Congress, serving from March 4, 1887, to March 3, 1889, winning 57.06% of the vote, defeating Democrat George Craighead Cabell; he unsuccessfully contested the election of Claude A. Swanson to the Fifty-fifth Congress. He reengaged in the tobacco business and retired from active business pursuits; Brown died in Martinsville, with interment in Oakwood Cemetery.

U.S. House of Representatives
Preceded by George Cabell	Member of the U.S. House of Representatives from Virginia's 5th congressional district 1887–1889	Succeeded by Posey G. Lester
