= Thomas Russell Bowden =

American politician

Thomas Russell Bowden (May 20, 1841 – July 6, 1893) served as Attorney General of the Restored government of Virginia from 1863 to 1865 and of Virginia from 1865 to 1869.

== Biography ==
Bowden, the son of Lemuel J. Bowden, was born near Williamsburg, Virginia and attended the College of William and Mary. During the American Civil War he became a Republican. In May 1863 Bowden was the Unionist candidate for attorney general of the Restored government of Virginia and won the election with 2,743 votes, thus becoming the youngest attorney general of Virginia up until that time at the age of twenty-two.

Bowden sought reelection in 1869 but was defeated by James Craig Taylor in the election held on July 6, 1869. Bowden resigned as attorney general effective August 1, 1869. Until Taylor took office on January 19, 1870, Charles Whittlesey was appointed to fill the vacancy. Not long after leaving office, Bowden moved to Washington, D.C., where he practiced law for more than twenty years. He was the author of Blunders in Educated Circles Corrected (1889). Bowden died in Washington, D.C., and was buried in Cedar Grove Cemetery in Williamsburg, Virginia.

| Preceded by James S. Wheat | Attorney General of the Restored Government of Virginia; 1863 – 1865 | Succeeded by None |
| Preceded by John Randolph Tucker | Attorney General of Virginia; 1865 – 1869 | Succeeded by Charles Whittlesey |
