= Robert Ridgway (Virginia politician) =

American journalist and politician

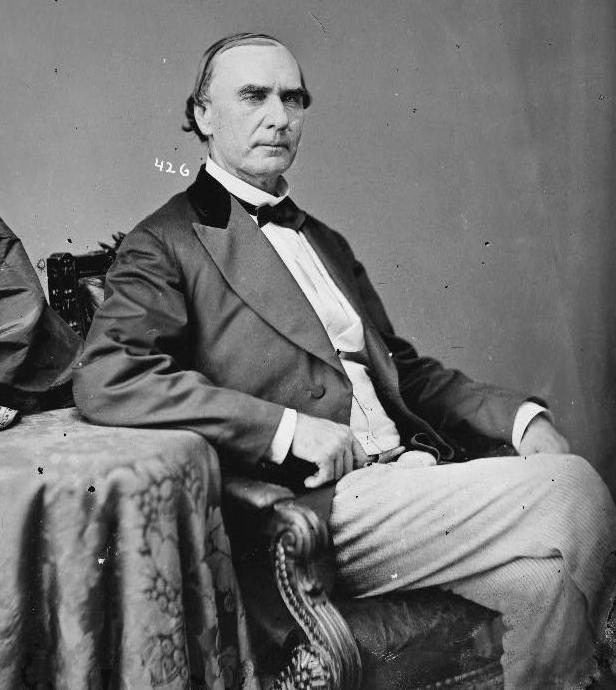

Member of the U.S. House of Representatives from Virginia's 5th district
- In office January 27, 1870 – October 16, 1870
- Preceded by: Thomas S. Bocock
- Succeeded by: Richard T.W. Duke

Personal details
- Born: April 21, 1823 Lynchburg, Virginia, US
- Died: October 16, 1870 (aged 47) Amherst, Virginia, US
- Party: Whig (until 1869)
- Other political affiliations: Conservative (after 1869)
- Education: Emory and Henry College; University of Virginia
- Profession: Politician, Lawyer, Newspaper Editor

Robert Ridgway (April 21, 1823 – October 16, 1870) was a nineteenth-century congressman, lawyer and journalist from Virginia.

== Early and family life ==
Born in Lynchburg, Virginia, Ridgeway attended Emory and Henry College and graduated from the University of Virginia after studying law.

== Career ==
Admitted to the Virginia bar, Ridgway began his legal practice in Liberty, Virginia (the Bedford county seat, which was incorporated in 1839 as a town, and renamed Bedford two decades after his death). He also was editor of the Bedford Sentinel. In 1850 Ridgeway lived in a boardinghouse in Amherst, the county seat of Amherst County, Virginia, on the other side of Lynchburg, with the innkeeper's family and several clerks and a schoolmaster. In that census, he owned fifteen enslaved people, eight of them women (ranging from 65 and 56 years old to 16 and 12 year old girls) and seven men (ranging from 28 years old to 15, 12 and a 3 year old boy). In 1853, Ridgway moved to Richmond, Virginia, and became the editor of the Richmond Whig. However, in 1860 he continued to own 10 slaves in Amherst County (two 70 year old women, women aged 25, 22 and 20, a 20 year old man, girls aged 7 and 2, and a 10 year old boy).

At the outbreak of the Civil War, Ridgeway returned to Amherst. However "Richard S. Ridgeway" enlisted as a private in Company D of the 6th Virginia Cavalry on April 18, 1861, then went AWOL in September and was discharged on December 23, 1861, based on a surgeon's certificate concerning hip damage in a railroad accident.

Shortly the war's end, in 1866, voters in Bedford, Amherst and nearby counties elected Ridgway as a Whig to the United States House of Representatives. However, fellow Congressmen did not permit him to be seated, because Virginia was still under Congressional Reconstruction and had not adopted a state constitution to replace the 1850 state constitution which allowed slavery. After Virginians ratified a new state constitution in 1869 (without its proposed bar on former Confederates holding office), voters in the 5th Congressional district elected Ridgway as a Conservative to the House, and he served from January 1870 until his death on October 16, 1870, in Amherst, Virginia. He appears in the 1870 census as living in Elon, Virginia, with his 86 year old mother Mary Ridgway as the head of household, and sisters Elizabeth, Harriet and Rhodie (aged 60, 50 and 48), as well as 44 year old Bettie Winston and 17 year old white servant Priscilla Gentry.

== Death and legacy ==
Congressman Ridgway was interred in the family cemetery in Amherst.

== See also ==
- List of members of the United States Congress who died in office (1790–1899)

U.S. House of Representatives
Preceded by Thomas S. Bocock^{(1)}	Member of the U.S. House of Representatives from Virginia's 5th congressional district January 27, 1870 – October 16, 1870	Succeeded by Richard T. W. Duke
Notes and references
1. Because of Virginia's secession, the House seat was vacant for almost nine years before Ridgway succeeded Bocock.
