= J. Randolph Tucker (politician) =

American politician (1823–1897)

John Randolph Tucker
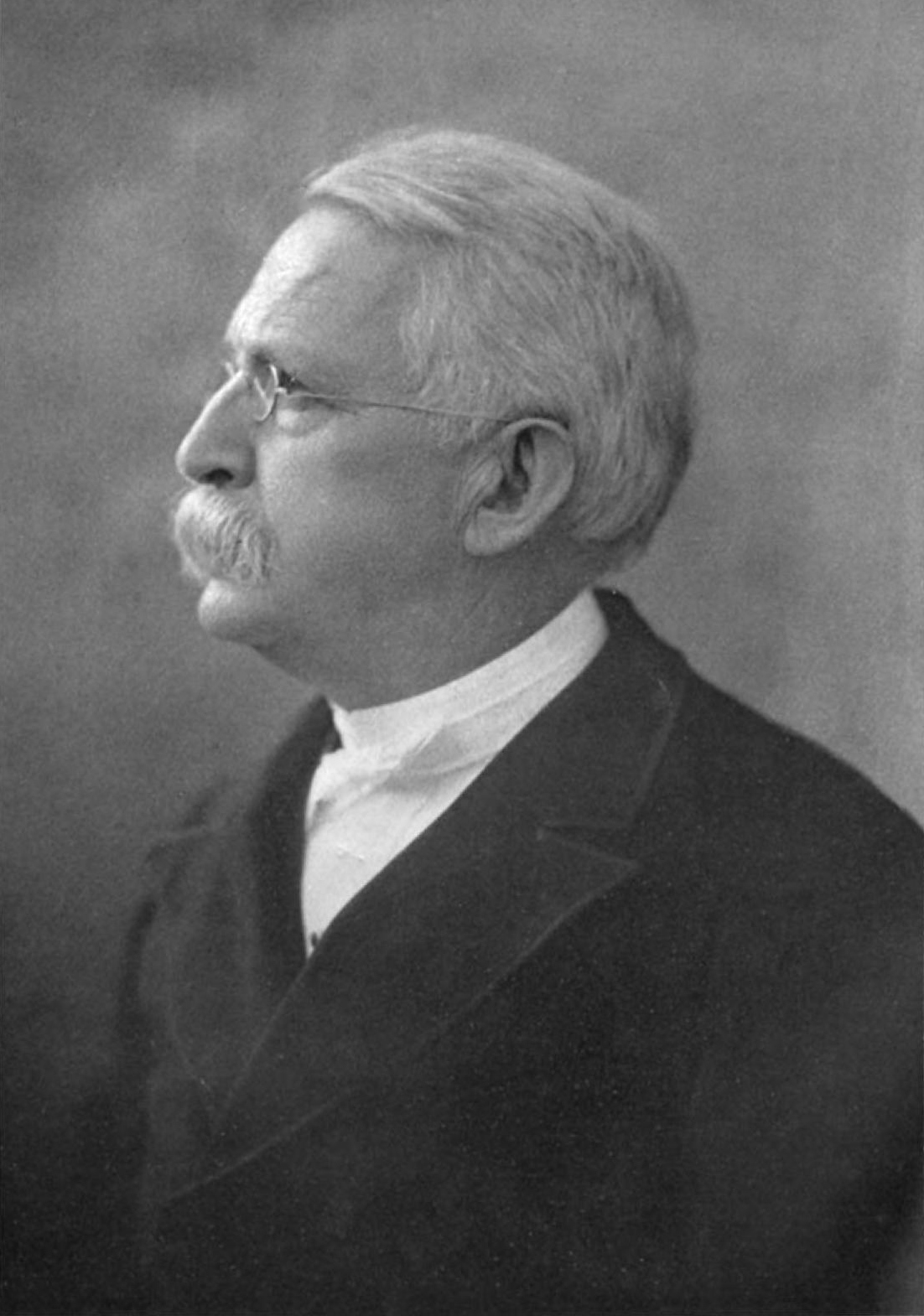

Chairman of the House Democratic Caucus
- In office March 4, 1885 – March 3, 1887
- Speaker: John G. Carlisle
- Preceded by: George W. Geddes
- Succeeded by: Samuel S. Cox

Member of the U.S. House of Representatives from Virginia
- In office March 4, 1875 – March 3, 1887
- Preceded by: Thomas Whitehead (1875); District reestablished (1885)
- Succeeded by: John W. Daniel (1885); Jacob Yost (1887)
- Constituency: 6th district (1875–1885); 10th district (1885–1887)

Chairman of the Committee on the Judiciary
- In office March 4, 1883 – March 3, 1887
- Preceded by: Thomas Brackett Reed
- Succeeded by: David B. Culberson

Chairman of the Committee on Ways and Means
- In office 1881
- Preceded by: Fernando Wood
- Succeeded by: William D. Kelley

8th Attorney General of Virginia
- In office June 13, 1857 – May 9, 1865; Contested with James S. Wheat: June 21, 1861 – December 7, 1863; Contested with Thomas Russell Bowden: December 7, 1863 – May 6, 1865
- Governor: Henry A. Wise; John Letcher; William Smith
- Preceded by: Willis P. Bocock
- Succeeded by: Thomas Russell Bowden

Personal details
- Born: December 24, 1823 Winchester, Virginia, U.S.
- Died: February 13, 1897 (aged 73) Lexington, Virginia, U.S.
- Resting place: Mount Hebron Cemetery
- Party: Democratic
- Spouse: Laura Holmes Powell Tucker
- Children: Henry St. George Tucker
- Profession: Lawyer; politician; professor

John Randolph Tucker (December 24, 1823 – February 13, 1897) was an American lawyer, author, and politician from Virginia. From a distinguished family, he was elected Virginia's attorney general in 1857 and after re-election served during the American Civil War (James S. Wheat served as attorney general in Union-held portions of the state). After a pardon and Congressional Reconstruction, Tucker was elected as U.S. Congressman (1875-1887), and later served as the first dean of the Washington and Lee University Law School.

== Early life and family ==
Tucker was born in Winchester, Virginia on Christmas Eve in 1823, the son of Anna Evalina Hunter Tucker (1789-1855) and her husband Judge Henry St. George Tucker (1780-1848). A grandson of St. George Tucker, J.R. Tucker would become proud of his heritage among the First Families of Virginia. His father and many relatives owned plantations and enslaved persons. Nonetheless, several of his siblings never reached adulthood. His brothers Dr. Alfred Bland Tucker (1830-1862) and Lt.Col. St. George Hunter Tucker (1828-1863) would die of consumption while in the Confederate States Army; his brother Dr. David Hunter Tucker (1815-1871) became a professor at three medical schools including the Medical College of Virginia and survived his Confederate service. His brother Nathaniel Beverley Tucker (1820-1890) would become a Confederate diplomat and later a journalist.

John Randolph Tucker attended a private school near his Winchester home, then entered the Richmond Academy. He finished his studies at the University of Virginia, graduating with a legal degree in 1844.

He married Laura Powell in 1848. They had one son who survived to adulthood, Henry St. George Tucker, III (who later became a U.S. Congressman). Their daughters who married well and survived their parents included: Anne Holmes Tucker McGuire (1850 - 1914), Gertrude Tucker Logan (1856 - 1925), and Laura Randolph Tucker Pendleton (1860 - 1946).

== Early legal and political career ==
John Randolph Tucker was admitted to the Virginia bar in 1845, and began a private legal practice in Winchester. In 1854 he delivered a major speech to the literary societies at College of William and Mary which argued that slavery was consistent with republicanism. He also became active in politics and was a presidential elector on the Democratic ticket in 1852 and 1856.

== American Civil War ==
Voters elected Tucker Attorney General of the Commonwealth of Virginia in 1857, and he served during the American Civil War, until the Commonwealth surrendered to Union forces in 1865. His siblings also actively supported the Confederate cause, two as Confederate doctors, Nathaniel Beverley Tucker as a Confederate diplomat, and his lawyer brother St. George Hunter Tucker recruited the Ashland Grays (part of the 15th Virginia Infantry) and served at Lt. Col., winning plaudits for his conduct at the Battle of Malvern Hill before resigning his commission and dying of consumption in Charlottesville in 1863.

== Postwar legal and political career ==
Tucker received a pardon and resumed his private legal practice.

Elected to the United States House of Representatives as a Democrat in 1875, he served until 1887. He was chairman of the House Committee on Ways and Means in the 46th Congress and chairman of the House Committee on the Judiciary in the 48th and 49th Congresses.

He took an active part in the debates on the tariff, in opposition to the protective policy. His speeches on other questions include those on the Electoral Commission bill, the constitutional doctrine as to the presidential count, the Hawaiian treaty in 1876, the use of the army at the polls, in 1879, and Chinese emigration, in 1883. He introduced legislation broadening the power of the federal Court of Claims to hear Constitutional claims in 1886, which became known as the Tucker Act. He declined to be renominated to the House in 1886. He was co-sponsor of the 1887 Edmunds–Tucker Act.

Tucker was an exemplar of the racist views of his day. Speaking on the House floor, he asserted that “We did not ordain and establish this Constitution for the Chinaman and for all the other races of the earth. . . . I hold that this Constitution was ordained and established by our fathers for their posterity of the Caucasian people of America.” Not surprisingly, he was also not supportive of the post-Civil War push to grant rights to African Americans, declaring that “. . . there is not a philosophical statesman in this land who to-day does not say either that the citizenship and the voting power of the African race in the South is a failure--either that or that it is an unsolved problem of our future. We have that one disease in the body-politic, which God grant we may recover from.”

=== Electoral history ===
- 1874 — Tucker was elected to the U.S. House of Representatives with 65.23% of the vote, defeating Republican J. Foote Johnson.
- 1876 — Tucker was re-elected with 59.61% of the vote, defeating Republican George H. Burch.
- 1878 — Tucker was re-elected with 63.42% of the vote, defeating Independent Democrat Camm Patterson and Independent Lewis W. Cabell.
- 1880 — Tucker was re-elected with 59.56% of the vote, defeating Readjuster James A. Frazier and Republican David J. Woodfin.
- 1882 — Tucker was re-elected with 54.95% of the vote, defeating Readjuster Henry J. Rives and Republican Woodfin.
- 1884 — Tucker was re-elected, but to Virginia's 10th congressional district

Tucker made an unsuccessful but legally influential argument on behalf of August Spies and the other Haymarket Riot defendants during their appeal to the Supreme Court. Elected professor of Constitutional law at Washington and Lee University in 1888, Tucker was Dean of the School of Law from 1893 to 1897. Tucker served as president of The Virginia Bar Association in 1891–1892, and president of the American Bar Association in 1894. He was elected to the American Philosophical Society in 1895.

== Death and legacy ==
Tucker died in 1897 in Lexington, Virginia and is buried in the family plot at Mount Hebron Cemetery in Winchester. His widow died in 1916. Tucker's two volume treatise, The Constitution of the United States, appeared posthumously in 1899. One of his sons, Henry St. George Tucker, also became dean of the Washington and Lee Law School, and later a U.S. Congressman representing Winchester. His Lexington home, Blandome, was listed on the National Register of Historic Places in 2002.

== Works ==
- Race Progress in the United States, by J. R. Tucker, The North American review. / Volume 138, Issue 327 (February, 1884) pp. 163-178
- The History of the Federal Convention of 1787, and of its work, by J. Randolph Tucker, New Englander and Yale review / Volume 47, Issue 209 (August, 1887) pp. 97-147.
- Virginia in the Supreme Court, by J. Randolph Tucker, The North American review / Volume 146, Issue 379 (June, 1888) pp. 674-681.
- Tucker, John Randolph (1981). Henry St. George Tucker (ed.). The Constitution of the United States : a critical discussion of its genesis, development, and interpretation. Littleton, Colo.: F.B. Rothman, Reprint. Originally published: Chicago : Callaghan, 1899. ISBN 0-8377-1206-8.

== Notes ==
Legal offices
Preceded by Willis Perry Bocock	Attorney General of Virginia; 1857–1865	Succeeded by James S. Wheat
U.S. House of Representatives
Preceded by Thomas Whitehead	Member of the U.S. House of Representatives from Virginia's 6th congressional district 1875–1885	Succeeded by John W. Daniel
Preceded by William G. Brown, Jr.	Member of the U.S. House of Representatives from Virginia's 10th congressional district 1885–1887	Succeeded by Jacob Yost
Academic offices
Preceded by Position established	Dean of Washington and Lee University School of Law; 1893–1897	Succeeded by Charles A. Graves
