= James Sanders Wheat =

American politician (1810–1874)

Unionist Attorney General of Virginia
- In office 1861–1863
- Preceded by: John Randolph Tucker (contested)
- Succeeded by: Thomas Russell Bowden

Member of the Virginia House of Delegates from the Ohio County district
- In office December 3, 1849 – December 1, 1850
- Preceded by: William Pitts
- Succeeded by: Charles Wells Russell

Personal details
- Born: May 8, 1810 Prince George's County, Maryland, US
- Died: September 24, 1874 (aged 60) Wheeling, West Virginia, US
- Party: Republican
- Spouse: Elizabeth Johnson Dorsey
- Children: 5
- Occupation: lawyer

James Sanders Wheat (May 9, 1810 – September 17, 1874) was the Attorney General of Virginia in Union held territory from 1861 to 1863.

== Early and family life ==
James Wheat was born on May 9, 1810, the fourth son of merchant Thomas Wheat and his wife Mary Chatham, at Cool Spring Plantation, Prince George's County, Maryland. Although his father lived in Washington, D.C. during the War of 1812 and had some connection with the Washington Navy Yard, James lived most of his adult life in Wheeling, Ohio County in what became West Virginia during the American Civil War. His father and uncle Benoni Wheat were West Indies traders with a dock and warehouses in Alexandria, Virginia. His elder brothers were John Thomas Wheat (1801-1888), Samuel Wheat who moved to St. Louis, Missouri and Henry; his sisters were Mary E. and Josephine.

By 1830 he was a resident of Wheeling. He married Elizabeth Johnson Dorsey (b. 1820). The 1850 census recorded them living in Wheeling (then still in Virginia) and supporting his parents and sister and her child, as well as their children James Cheatham Wheat (1840-1915), Julia Wheat (b.1843), Stanley Hulliken Wheat (1842-1932) and Eli D. Wheat (b. 1849).

== Career ==
James Sanders Wheat was admitted to the Virginia bar and practiced law in Wheeling. Ohio County voters elected him to represent them in the Virginia House of Delegates in 1849, and he served in that single session which began on December 3, succeeding William Pitts and was succeeded by Charles W. Russell in the legislative session that began on December 2, 1850.

When Virginia seceded from the Union in early April 1861, West Virginians disagreed, and many met in Clarksburg on April 22, 1861, and called for a convention to decide their status. The first Wheeling Convention (with representatives from 24 Unionist counties including Frederick County which chose not to join them), met beginning on May 13, 1861, but could not decide whether to secede from the Commonwealth of Virginia. Wheat was a member of the moderate faction which believed that open resistance to Virginia authorities so soon after their secession vote would invite disturbance and bloodshed. Other members of that faction included fellow attorney Francis H. Pierpont of Fairmont (with whom Wheat disagreed on other matters), John J. Jackson Sr. of Parkersburg, and Waitman T. Willey of Morgantown.

The delegates called for elections for a second convention, which met at Wheeling beginning June 4, with representatives from 32 counties. General John J. Jackson and Waitman T. Willey were conspicuously absent; Arthur I. Boreman was elected the convention's president. On June 19 the delegates decided to enact an ordinance to re-establish a loyal state government, and by evening had elected Francis H. Pierpont the governor and Daniel Polsley as lieutenant governor. James S. Wheat, who had been acting as adjutant-general in the Unionist territory for a month, was elected the state's attorney general on June 21. Meanwhile, John Randolph Tucker continued as Virginia's Attorney General in Confederate sections of the state.

President Abraham Lincoln acknowledged Pierpont as Virginia's governor and soon named fellow Wheeling attorney A. Bolton Caldwell as the U.S. Attorney for the Western District of Virginia, to handle federal matters (and the U.S. Senate concurred). After West Virginia voters seceded from Virginia, and approved their new Constitution in the summer of 1863, they selected Caldwell to become their first Attorney General (and Boreman to become their first Governor). Caldwell had run unopposed.

Meanwhile, Virginia voters in Union-held territory (known as the Restored Government of Virginia, which had expanded to include Alexandria and much of northeastern Virginia), elected Thomas Russell Bowden to succeed Wheat.

Wheat returned to what had become West Virginia, and was a member of its state Constitutional Convention in 1872.

== Death and legacy ==
James Sanders Wheat died in 1874 and was buried in Wheeling's Peninsula cemetery.
