= George Cabell =

American politician (1836–1906)

George Craighead Cabell
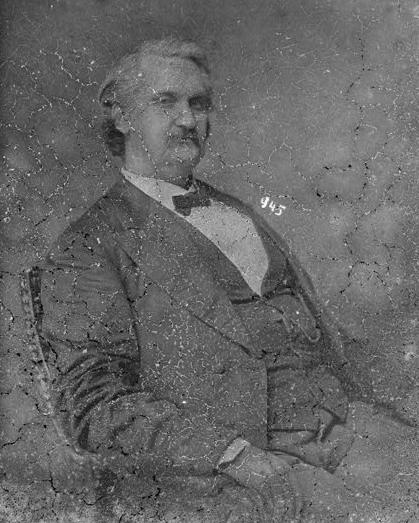

Member of the U.S. House of Representatives from Virginia's 5th district
- In office March 4, 1875 – March 3, 1887
- Preceded by: Christopher Thomas
- Succeeded by: John R. Brown

Chairman of Committee on Railways and Canals
- In office March 4, 1877 – March 3, 1881
- Preceded by: Thomas L. Jones
- Succeeded by: Amos Townsend

Member of the Virginia House of Delegates from Pittsylvania County and the City of Danville
- In office 1902–1903; Alongside R. Logan Coleman, Joseph Reynolds and J.W. Bruce

Personal details
- Born: January 25, 1836 Danville, Virginia
- Died: June 23, 1906 (aged 70) Baltimore, Maryland
- Party: Democratic
- Education: University of Virginia
- Profession: Politician, Lawyer, Newspaper Editor

Military service
- Allegiance: Confederate States of America
- Branch/service: Confederate States Army
- Rank: Colonel
- Unit: 18th Virginia Infantry Regiment
- Battles/wars: American Civil War

George Craighead Cabell (January 25, 1836 – June 23, 1906) was a nineteenth-century congressman, lawyer and editor from Virginia.

== Early and family life ==
Born in Danville, Virginia, Cabell attended Danville Academy and later the University of Virginia, from which he graduated in 1857.

== Career ==
After admission to the Virginia bar, Cabell began his legal practice in Danville in 1858. From one of the First Families of Virginia, Cabell was elected Danville's commonwealth attorney (prosecutor) in 1858, and served until 1861. He was editor of the Republican and later Democratic Appeal in Danville.

=== American Civil War ===
When Virginia seceded in April, 1861, Cabell enlisted in the Confederate Army as a private in 1861. During the first year of the Civil War, Cabell received a promotion to major and was assigned to the 18th Regiment, Virginia Infantry. He was later promoted to colonel which rank he helduntil the end of the war.

=== Postwar years ===
Cabell resumed his legal practice in Danville. After Congressional Reconstruction ended, he ran as a Democrat for a seat in the United States House of Representatives in 1874. He defeated incumbent Republican Christopher Thomas and later won re-election several times, serving from 1875 to 1887. There, Cabell served as chairman of the Committee on Railways and Canals from 1877 to 1881. After losing his bid for reelection in 1886, John R. Brown succeeded to the seat.

Cabell resumed his legal practice in Danville, and his son George Craighead Cabell Jr. started a political career, winning election as one of three delegates representing the city in the Virginia General Assembly, but resigned and was replaced by J.W. Bruce on November 10, 1903.

== Death and legacy ==
Cabell died in Baltimore, Maryland on June 23, 1906. He was interred in Green Hill Cemetery in Danville.

== Elections ==
- 1874; Cabell was elected to the U.S. House of Representatives with 57.13% of the vote, defeating Republican Christopher Yancy Thomas.
- 1876; Cabell was re-elected with 60.61% of the vote, defeating Republican Daniel S. Lewis.
- 1878; Cabell was re-elected with 66.7% of the vote, defeating Independent W.A. Witcher.
- 1880; Cabell was re-elected with 51.25% of the vote, defeating Readjuster John T. Stovall.
- 1882; Cabell was re-elected with 52.99% of the vote, defeating Readjuster William E. Sims.
- 1884; Cabell was re-elected with 55.04% of the vote, defeating Republican J.W. Hartwell.
- 1886; Cabell lost his re-election bid.

U.S. House of Representatives
Preceded by Christopher Thomas	Member of the U.S. House of Representatives from Virginia's 5th congressional district 1875–1887	Succeeded by John R. Brown
