= George Booker =

American politician (1821–1883)

George William Booker
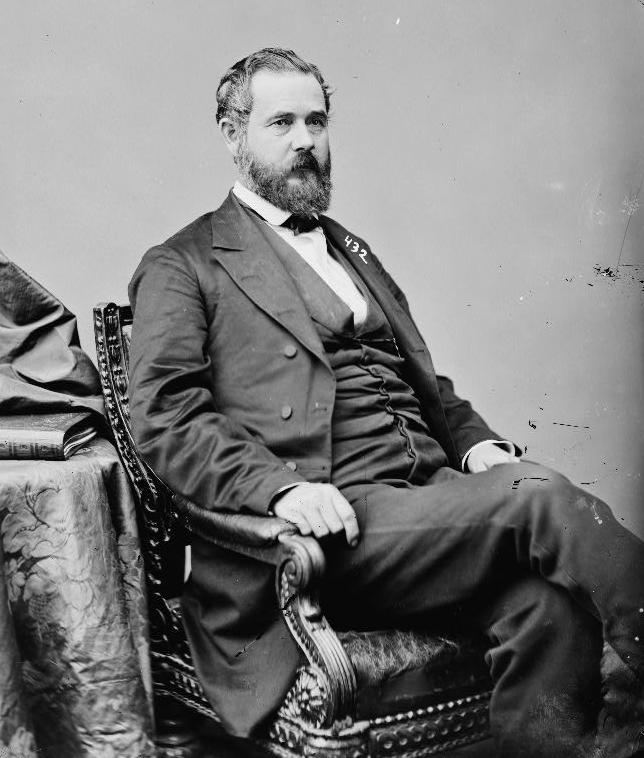

Member of the U.S. House of Representatives from Virginia's 4th district
- In office January 26, 1870 – March 3, 1871
- Preceded by: Roger A. Pryor
- Succeeded by: William H.H. Stowell

Member of the Virginia House of Delegates from Henry County
- In office 1872–1873
- Preceded by: Christopher Thomas
- Succeeded by: William Morris

Member of the Virginia House of Delegates from Henry County
- In office 1866–1867
- Preceded by: Samuel Mullens
- Succeeded by: Christopher Thomas

Personal details
- Born: December 5, 1821 Stuart, Virginia, US
- Died: June 4, 1883 (aged 61) Martinsville, Virginia, US
- Resting place: Martinsville, Virginia, US
- Party: Republican, Conservative
- Profession: Politician, Lawyer, farmer

George William Booker (December 5, 1821 – June 4, 1883) was a nineteenth-century American politician, farmer and lawyer from Henry County, Virginia who was a Unionist during the American Civil War, then served in various local offices during and after the conflict before winning election to the Virginia House of Delegates before and after his service in the U.S. House of Representatives, all while associating at different times with various political parties.

== Early life ==
Born near Stuart in Patrick County, Virginia to the former Elizabeth Anglin and her husband Edward Booker, Booker received a private education locally before farming and teaching school. He studied law. While ancestors had served in the House of Burgesses, as well as fought in the American Revolutionary War and lived in various Southside Virginia counties, his father was not wealthy, nor would be the son.

== Early career ==
Admitted to the bar in Henry County in 1847, he began his legal career which encompassed several nearby counties. However, in the 1860 federal census, Booker listed his occupation as "farmer", with real estate valued at $1000 and other property (including a 12 year old female slave and employed or leased a 20 year old male slave) at $2100.

In 1856, Booker was appointed a justice of the peace for Henry County (the justices of the peace collectively administering counties in that era). Two years later his fellow magistrates elected him as the county court's presiding judge, and he remained such until 1868. Booker later said that he was a strong Unionist and only voted for the Ordinance of Secession in 1861 because he feared reprisals from his neighbors. He also noted that he avoided being conscripted into the Confederate States Army in 1864 because of his position as justice of the peace and duties as a magistrate.

== Reconstruction ==
Following the Civil War, on October 12, 1865, Booker was elected as Henry County's representative to the Virginia House of Delegates and served from 1866 to 1867 In his first session he sat on the Committee on Military Affairs as well as the Committee to Examine the Clerk's office, and in the second session on the more powerful Committees on Propositions and Grievances as well as on the Militia and Police. Allied with other former Unionists such as John Minor Botts, Booker changed his allegiance from the Democratic party to the new Republican Party. During Congressional Reconstruction, Booker secured various temporary appointments, including as Commonwealth attorney for Patrick County as well as the nearby counties of Franklin and Prince Edward. On May 7, 1868, a Republican convention nominated him for the position of Attorney General of Virginia but no election was held, and Booker did not attend the convention the following year, as it was dominated by the party's Radical wing, which did not renominate him.

In June 1869, Booker announced his candidacy for the United States House of Representatives from Virginia's 4th congressional district, which then comprised Brunswick, Charlotte, Franklin, Halifax, Henry, Lunenburg, Mecklenburg, Patrick and Pittsylvania Counties. He moderated his earlier statements concerning secessionists and promoted reconciliation, including by endorsing the Conservative Party statewide ticket headed by Gilbert C. Walker (who won election as Governor). Booker defeated two Radical Republicans, one of whom unsuccessfully challenged Booker's eligibility due to his magisterial service during the conflict. This contest delayed Booker's assumption of his seat until February 1, 1870 (partway during the second session) and he served on the Committee on Freedmen's Affairs, although he submitted no major legislation and rarely spoke. In December 1870, he submitted remarks to the Congressional Globe supporting a bill to provide general amnesty to Confederate and Southern sympathizers.

Booker chose not to seek re-election to Congress, but instead again ran (successfully) to represent Henry County in the Virginia House of Delegates, where he became one of several Conservative Party floor leaders. He chaired important committees, including the Committee on Banks, Currency and Commerce, as well as a special committee to investigate allegations that northern bondholders had bribed members of the previous session to pass the Funding Act of 1871 (concerning prewar debts). Booker also at least once acted as Speaker pro tempore, and strongly supported free public schools. He also agreed to submit a petition from Anna Whitehead Bodeker of Richmond which asked that women be permitted to vote. Booker attended the Conservative Party convention of June 1872, and was elected a delegate to the Democratic National Convention which nominated Horace Greeley (a former abolitionist and liberal Republican) for President.

Retiring from politics, Booker resumed practicing law in Martinsville, Virginia.

== Personal life ==
Booker married Maria Philpott in the early 1850s. In 1868, they had a son whom they named for John Minor Botts. His elder brothers were twin boys, and the family also had two or three daughters.

== Death and legacy ==
Booker died of a stroke near his home in Martinsville on June 4, 1883, and was interred there in the family cemetery.

== Notes ==
U.S. House of Representatives
| Preceded by Roger A. Pryor^{(1)} | Member of the U.S. House of Representatives from Virginia's 4th congressional district January 26, 1870 – March 3, 1871 | Succeeded by William H. H. Stowell |
Notes and references
1. Because of Virginia's secession, the House seat was vacant for almost eleven years before Booker succeeded Pryor.
