= Raleigh T. Daniel =

American politician (1805–1877)

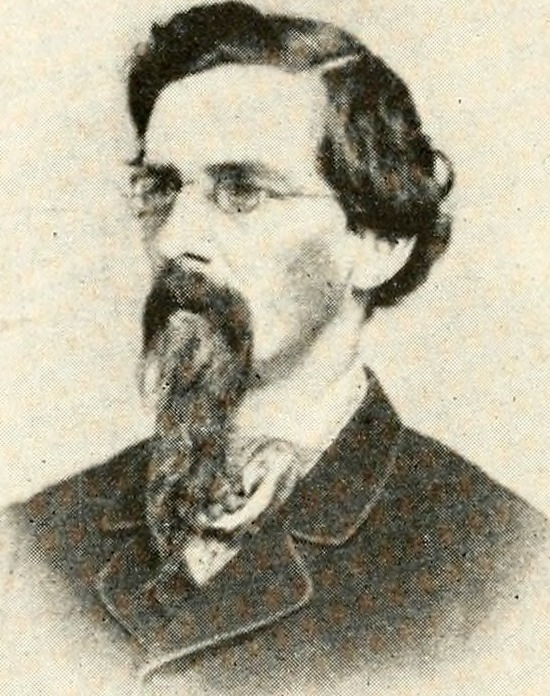

Attorney General of Virginia
- In office January 1, 1874 – August 16, 1877
- Governor: James L. Kemper
- Preceded by: James Craig Taylor
- Succeeded by: James Gaven Field

Personal details
- Born: Raleigh Travers Daniel; October 15, 1805 Stafford County, Virginia, U.S.
- Died: August 16, 1877 (aged 71)
- Resting place: Hollywood Cemetery
- Party: Conservative Party of Virginia
- Other political affiliations: Whig
- Spouse: Elizabeth Susan Tabb Riddle
- Children: 7
- Relatives: Peter V. Daniel (uncle)

Raleigh Travers Daniel (October 15, 1805 – August 16, 1877) was an American politician and lawyer in Virginia, who served as the first Attorney General of Virginia after reconstruction, a member of the Virginia House of Delegates, a member of the Virginia Council of State.

== Early life and family ==
Raleigh Travers Daniel was born on October 15, 1805, in Falmouth, Stafford County, Virginia, the son of John M. Daniel, a U.S. Army surgeon, and Margaret Stone Daniel. His maternal grandfather was Thomas Stone, signer of the Declaration of Independence.

After the death of his father in 1813, Daniel moved to Richmond to live with his uncle and legal guardian, Peter V. Daniel, a member of the Council of State and later an associate justice of the Supreme Court of the United States. Daniel studied law with his uncle and received his law license in Virginia in 1826.

In 1831, he married Elizabeth Susan Tabb Riddle. They had at least four daughters and three sons.

== Career ==
In the 1830s and 1840s, Daniel served as a commonwealth's attorney for Henrico Country. Daniel became active in Whig party circles and in 1841, he was elected to the Virginia House of Delegates representing the City of Richmond. He was reelected for three consecutive terms, serving in this capacity for four years. During the 1844–1845 session, he chaired the Committee on Banks. In 1844, Daniel was a presidential elector in support of Henry Clay's campaign. The following year, in January, the General Assembly, with a slim Whig majority, elected Daniel to the Virginia Council of State by a two-vote margin, replacing John Rutherfoord, a veteran member. Daniel was reelected three years later. On several occasions when the governor was absent from Richmond, Daniel assumed the role of acting lieutenant governor.

In August 1850, Daniel participated in a challenging campaign for a seat representing Richmond and the counties of Charles City, Henrico, and New Kent in a convention tasked with revising the state constitution. Daniel, opposed to the proposed democratic reforms, faced tough opposition and was defeated. In the 1860 presidential election, he supported John Bell, a former Whig and the candidate of the Constitutional Union Party.

While initially hesitant about secession, Daniel fully embraced the Confederate cause after the spring of 1861 and, in November of that year, served as a presidential elector for Jefferson Davis. Because he was unable to serve in the American Civil War due to his age, he assumed the role of commonwealth's attorney for Richmond. After the Civil War, Daniel was one of the founders and the first chairman of the Conservative Party of Virginia in December 1867. He strongly criticized the new proposed constitutional amendment which allowed universal manhood suffrage but, in his party's view, disenfranchised many Confederate veterans.

In 1870, Daniel ran for the position of congressman at-large from Virginia, a new seat created by members of the Convention of 1867–1868. However, his election faced complications, as the House of Representatives refused to seat Joseph E. Segar, who had been elected to the at-large seat in 1869. Daniel was elected without significant opposition in November 1870 but did not attempt to take his seat, as the House Committee on Elections made no report on his eligibility. Daniel briefly returned to the Virginia House of Delegates in 1871 for a two-year term, where he chaired the Committee on Finance.

=== Attorney General ===
In 1873, the Conservative Party nominated him for the office of Attorney General of Virginia. Daniel was elected on November 6, 1873, defeating the Republican candidate, David Fultz, by a substantial margin. Daniel's tenure as attorney general began on January 1, 1874, lasting three and a half years in the role. As Attorney General, he opposed granting inmates in the state penitentiary time off for good behavior, contending that such reductions should only occur through a gubernatorial act of clemency. Daniel also resisted the enforcement of federal laws aimed at protecting African American voting rights, arguing that these measures encroached on the state's authority over elections. Additionally, Daniel represented Virginia in a boundary dispute with Maryland before an arbitration commission, although the commission's decision did not align with his beliefs regarding the Potomac River's ownership and the Chesapeake Bay boundary.

== Death ==
Raleigh Travels Daniel died while in office, on August 16, 1877, shortly after securing a nomination for a second term as attorney general. He was laid to rest in Hollywood Cemetery.

Legal offices
Preceded by James Craig Taylor	Attorney General of Virginia; 1874–1877	Succeeded by James G. Field
