= Mercer County, Virginia =

Mercer County, Virginia has existed twice in the U.S. state of Virginia's history. Formed in 1785, and 1837, respectively, both counties were named for Revolutionary War General Hugh Mercer, who was killed at the Battle of Princeton in 1777, and each was separated from Virginia due to the creation of a new state, partitioned in accordance with Article IV, Section 3, Clause 1 of the United States Constitution. The two counties continued in existence as:

- Mercer County, Kentucky, separated when Kentucky was admitted to the Union in 1792.
- Mercer County, West Virginia, separated when West Virginia was admitted to the Union in 1863.

== See also ==
- Former counties, cities, and towns of Virginia
