= Conservative Party (Virginia, 1867) =

Political party in Virginia

The Conservative Party of Virginia was a United States political party in the state of Virginia during the second half of 19th century. It centered on opposition to Reconstruction. During its history, the party was successful in electing six congressmen to the U.S. House of Representatives, all during the 41st Congress. The party was related to similar conservative movements in other states, combining Liberal Republicans and repentant Democrats looking to improve their image as "friends of the black people" on a national level. The movement was also closely tied to the "New Departure" movement of Virginia statesman William Mahone. The Conservative Party's efforts ultimately divided the Republican Party in the state and caused its political power in Virginia to diminish.

== History ==
=== Foundation ===
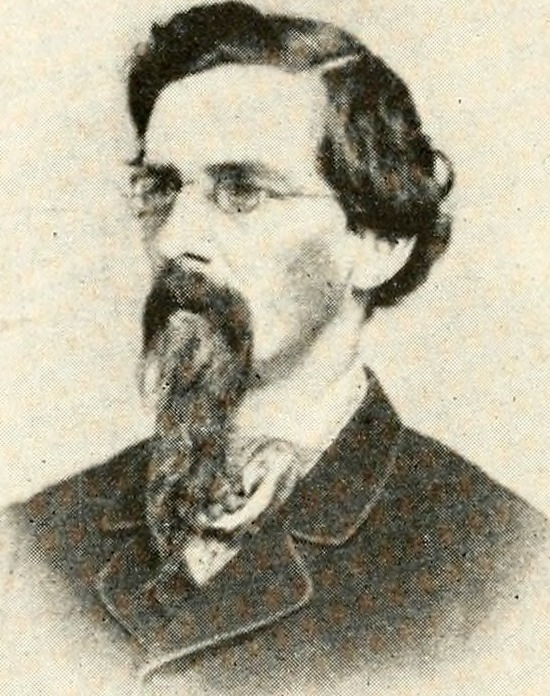
R. T. "Trav" Daniel

From December 11–12, 1867 a group of former Democrats, former Whigs, and moderate Republicans, led by Alexander Hugh Holmes Stuart held a convention in Richmond, Virginia. Raleigh T. Daniel, the party's first chairman and a former Whig, led the organization of the party throughout the state. Alexander H. H. Stuart would later lead the Committee of Nine to negotiate a compromise with President Ulysses S. Grant and leading members of Congress. The compromise called for a separate vote on former Confederate disfranchisement at the time of the referendum.

=== Rise ===
The party won majorities in both houses of the Virginia General Assembly in the 1869 elections and endorsed many moderate Republicans who had run against Radical Republicans. However, despite their opposition to the radical Republicans the party was divided on the issue of black suffrage although most were in agreement on economic issues. Despite the party's divided opinion on black suffrage thirty blacks were elected to assembly and many of them had their views in line with the Conservatives.

=== Division ===
In 1869 the Conservative party used its majorities in the assembly to create a free public school system as required by the new state constitution and the next year would segregate all schools in Virginia. Later the assembly voted to sell most of the state's stock in railroad companies, but the low prices that investors paid created suspicions of corruption, and the state treasury received less money than anticipated and voted to pay the large public debt left over from the pre–Civil War years by issuing new bonds with thirty-four-year maturity and six percent annual interest. The Funding Act of 1871 was widely unpopular and created two factions in the party, the Funders and the Readjusters, who would later create their own party, over the debate on whether or not paying the debt was more important than supporting the public schools.

A group of conservative members of the Virginia state legislature met in Richmond on July 1, 1870 to reorganize the party and submit their recommendations to the Legislatures with respect to congressional redistricting.

=== Demise ===
A popular bill that would increase the amount of revenue available to public schools was introduced and passed by the assembly in 1878, but was vetoed by Governor Frederick W. M. Holliday. The Readjusters would break away from the Conservative party and formed their own party and the remaining Conservative Funders lost their majorities in both houses in the same year to the Readjusters. The Readjusters would later win the governorship in 1881 causing the few Conservative bills passed by the assembly to be vetoed by William E. Cameron. In 1883 the party and most of its members merged with the Democratic party.

== Criticism ==
In 1876, former Virginia Governor Henry A. Wise denounced the party during testimony before the Virginia House of Delegates Committee on Elections, as nothing more than "old-fashioned Democrats, old-fashioned Whigs, Know Nothings, locofocos, sour-crout (sic) Democrats, and Greelyites," the latter a reference to Horace Greeley of New York, whose candidacy the Conservative Party endorsed for President of the United States in the 1872 presidential election.

== See also ==
- Conservative Party (United States)
