= Senator Heaton =

Senator Heaton may refer to:

- David Heaton (1823–1870), Ohio State Senate and Minnesota State Senate
- Robert Douglas Heaton (1873–1933), Pennsylvania State Senate
