= 41st United States Congress =

1869-1871 U.S. Congress

←	40th	42nd	→
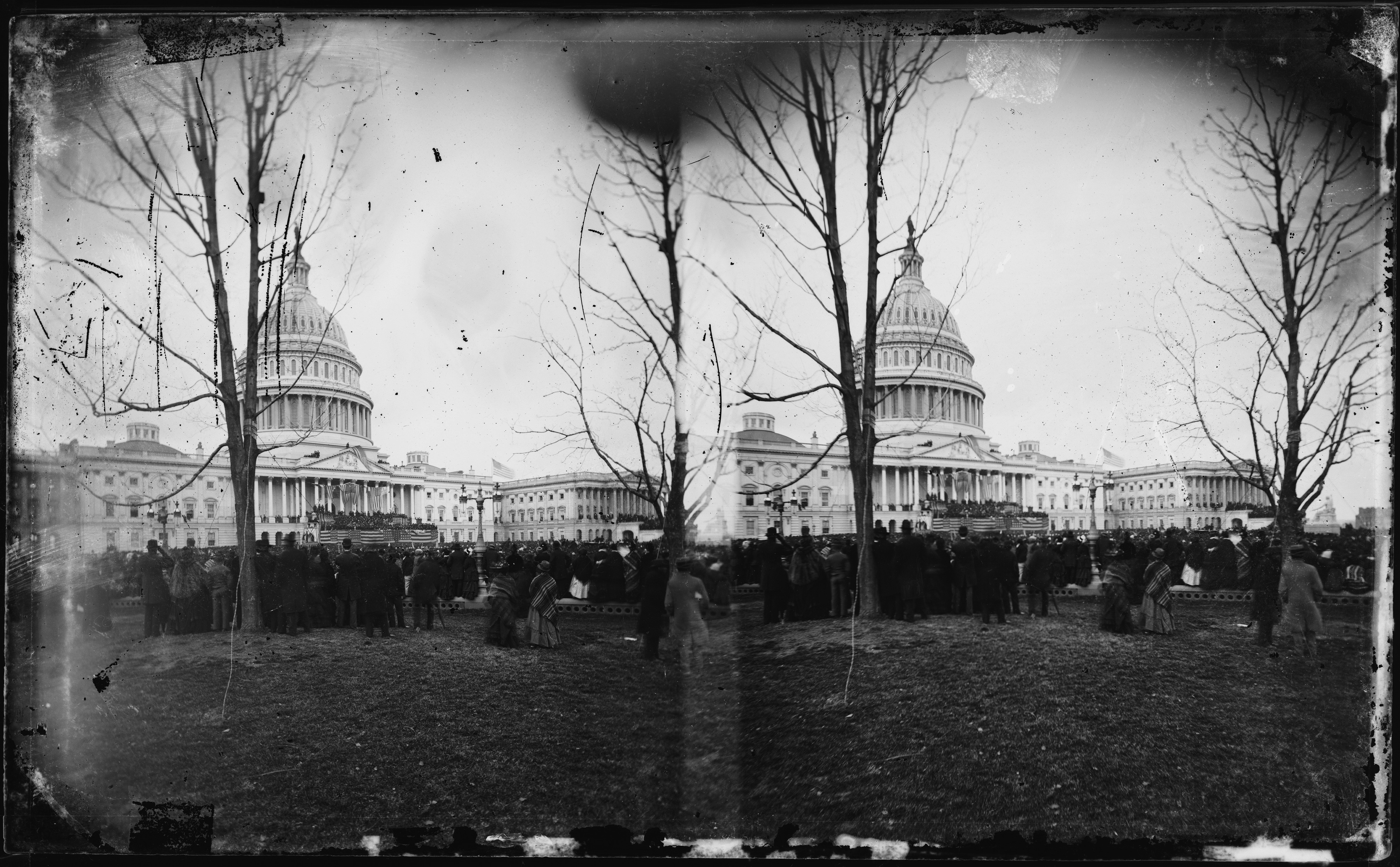
- United States Capitol (1877)

Overview
- Legislative body: United States Congress
- Jurisdiction: United States
- Term: March 4, 1869 – March 4, 1871

Senate
- Members: 74
- President: Schuyler Colfax (R)
- President pro tempore: Henry B. Anthony (R)
- Party control: Republican

House of Representatives
- Members: 243 representatives 9 non-voting delegates
- Speaker: James G. Blaine (R)
- Party control: Republican

Sessions
- 1st: March 4, 1869 – April 10, 1869
- 2nd: December 6, 1869 – July 15, 1870
- 3rd: December 5, 1870 – March 4, 1871

The 41st United States Congress was a meeting of the legislative branch of the United States federal government, consisting of the United States Senate and the United States House of Representatives. It met in Washington, D.C. from March 4, 1869, to March 4, 1871, during the first two years of Ulysses S. Grant's presidency. The apportionment of seats in the House of Representatives was based on the 1860 United States census. Both chambers had a Republican majority.

== Major events ==
- March 4, 1869: Ulysses Grant became President of the United States
- March 4, 1869: Carl Schurz R-Missouri became the first German American to serve in the United States Senate
- May 10, 1869: Golden spike marked the completion of the First transcontinental railroad in Promontory, Utah
- December 10, 1869: Wyoming Territory gave women the right to vote, one of the first such laws in the world
- February 12, 1870: Utah Territory gave women the right to vote
- February 25, 1870: Senator Hiram Rhodes Revels became the first African American in the U.S. Congress

== Major legislation ==
- March 18, 1869: Public Credit Act of 1869, Sess. 1, ch. 1, 16 Stat. 1
- April 10, 1869: Judiciary Act of 1869, Sess. 1, ch. 22, 16 Stat. 44
- May 31, 1870: Enforcement Act of 1870, Sess. 2, ch. 114, 16 Stat. 140
- June 22, 1870: An Act to establish the Department of Justice, Sess. 2, ch. 150, 16 Stat. 162
- June 29, 1870: An Act to reorganize the Marine Hospital Service, Sess. 2, ch. 169, 16 Stat. 169
- July 12, 1870: Currency Act of 1870, Sess. 2, ch. 252, 16 Stat. 251
- July 14, 1870: Funding Act of 1870, Sess. 2, ch. 256, 16 Stat. 272
- February 21, 1871: District of Columbia Organic Act of 1871, Sess. 3, ch. 62, Pub. L. 41–62, 16 Stat. 419

== Constitutional amendments ==
- February 3, 1870: Fifteenth Amendment was ratified by the requisite number of states (then 28) to become part of the Constitution

== States readmitted ==
- January 26, 1870: Virginia rejoined the Union
- February 23, 1870: Mississippi rejoined the Union
- March 30, 1870: Texas rejoined the Union
- July 15, 1870: Georgia rejoined the Union, the last former Confederate state to be readmitted

== Party summary ==
The count below identifies party affiliations at the beginning of the first session of this Congress, and includes members from vacancies and newly admitted states, when they were first seated. Changes resulting from subsequent replacements are shown below in the "Changes in membership" section.

During this Congress, Virginia, Mississippi, Texas, and Georgia were readmitted to representation.

=== Senate ===
	Party (shading shows control)			Total	Vacant
	Democratic (D)	Republican (R)	Other	Total	Vacant
End of previous congress	9	57	0	66	8
Begin	9	57	0	66	8
End	12	62	0	74	0
Final voting share	16.2%	83.8%	0.0%		
Beginning of next congress	16	55	1 (Note: Liberal Republican)	72	2

=== House of Representatives ===
	Party (shading shows control)				Total	Vacant
	Democratic (D)	Republican (R)	Conservative (C)	Other	Total	Vacant
End of previous congress	45	170	2	3 (Note: Independent Republican, & Conservative Republican)	220	23
Begin	65	149	0	0	214	29
End	67	167	5	0	239	4
Final voting share	28.0%	69.9%	2.1%	0.0%		
Beginning of next congress	93	144	0	2 (Note: Liberal Republican & Independent Republican)	239	2

== Leadership ==
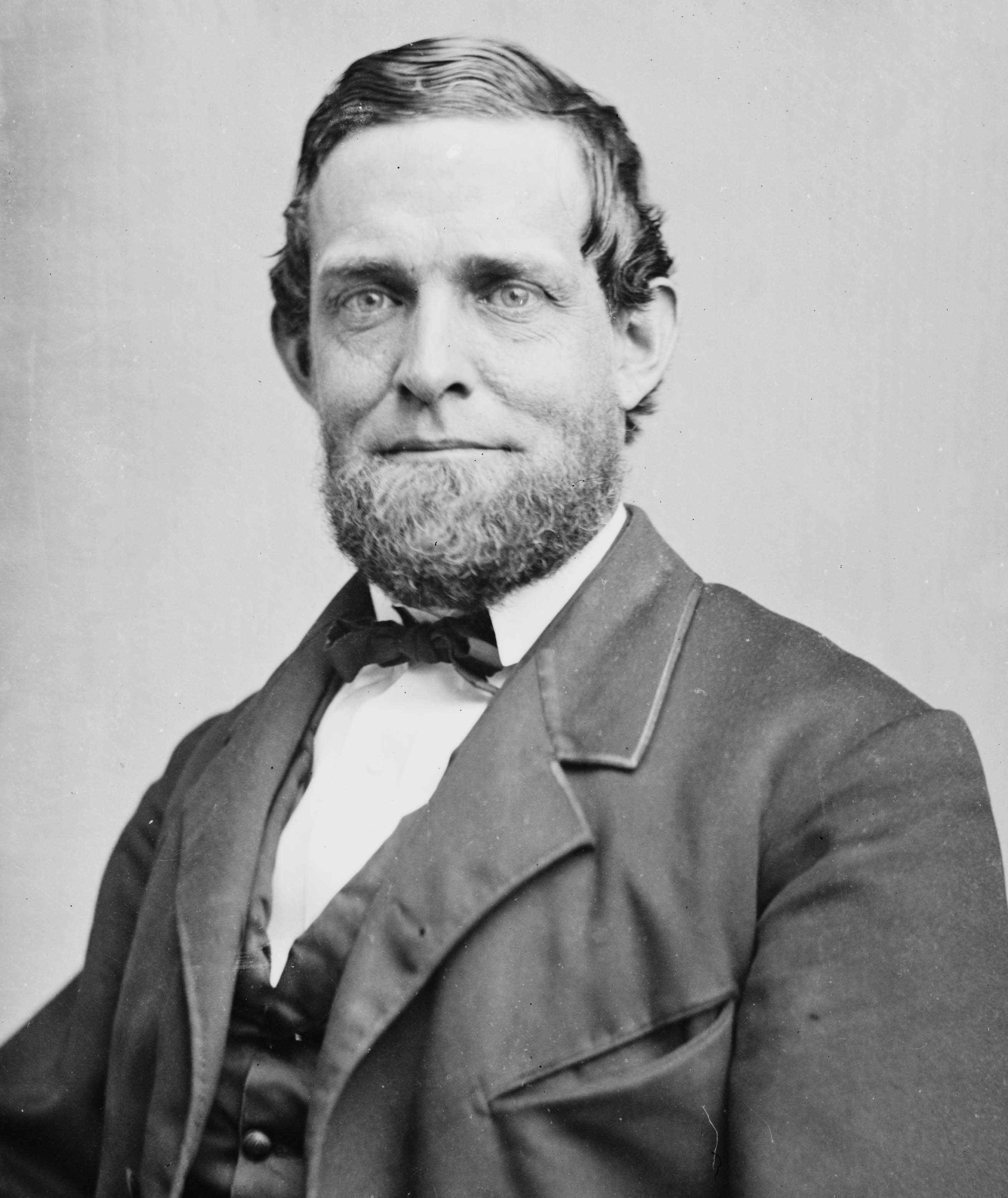
President of the Senate Schuyler Colfax

=== Senate ===
- President: Schuyler Colfax (R)
- President pro tempore: Henry B. Anthony (R)

=== House of Representatives ===
- Speaker: James G. Blaine (R)
- Republican Conference Chairman: Robert C. Schenck and Nathaniel P. Banks
- Democratic Caucus Chairman: William E. Niblack and Samuel J. Randall

== Members ==
This list is arranged by chamber, then by state. Senators are listed then by class and representatives are listed then by district.

Skip to House of Representatives, below

=== Senate ===
Senators were elected by the state legislatures every two years, with one-third beginning new six-year terms with each Congress. Preceding the names in the list below are Senate class numbers, which indicate the cycle of their election. In this Congress, "Class 1" meant their term began in this Congress, facing re-election in 1874; "Class 2" meant their term ended in this Congress, facing re-election in 1870; and "Class 3" meant their term began in the last Congress, facing re-election in 1872.

==== Alabama ====
▌2. Willard Warner (R)
▌3. George E. Spencer (R)

==== Arkansas ====
▌2. Alexander McDonald (R)
▌3. Benjamin F. Rice (R)

==== California ====
▌1. Eugene Casserly (D)
▌3. Cornelius Cole (R)

==== Connecticut ====
▌1. William A. Buckingham (R)
▌3. Orris S. Ferry (R)

==== Delaware ====
▌1. Thomas F. Bayard (D)
▌2. Willard Saulsbury Sr. (D)

==== Florida ====
▌1. Abijah Gilbert (R)
▌3. Thomas W. Osborn (R)

==== Georgia ====
▌2. Homer V. M. Miller (D), from February 24, 1871
▌3. Joshua Hill (R), from February 1, 1871

==== Illinois ====
▌2. Richard Yates (R)
▌3. Lyman Trumbull (R)

==== Indiana ====
▌1. Daniel D. Pratt (R)
▌3. Oliver P. Morton (R)

==== Iowa ====
▌2. James W. Grimes (R), until December 6, 1869

▌James B. Howell (R), from January 18, 1870

▌3. James Harlan (R)

==== Kansas ====
▌2. Edmund G. Ross (R)
▌3. Samuel C. Pomeroy (R)

==== Kentucky ====
▌2. Thomas C. McCreery (D)
▌3. Garrett Davis (D)

==== Louisiana ====
▌2. John S. Harris (R)
▌3. William P. Kellogg (R)

==== Maine ====
▌1. Hannibal Hamlin (R)
▌2. William P. Fessenden (R), until September 8, 1869

▌Lot M. Morrill (R), from October 30, 1869

==== Maryland ====
▌1. William T. Hamilton (D)
▌3. George Vickers (D)

==== Massachusetts ====
▌1. Charles Sumner (R)
▌2. Henry Wilson (R)

==== Michigan ====
▌1. Zachariah Chandler (R)
▌2. Jacob M. Howard (R)

==== Minnesota ====
▌1. Alexander Ramsey (R)
▌2. Daniel S. Norton (R), until July 14, 1870

▌William Windom (R), July 15, 1870 – January 22, 1871
▌Ozora P. Stearns (R), from January 22, 1871

==== Mississippi ====
▌1. Adelbert Ames (R), from February 23, 1870
▌2. Hiram R. Revels (R), from February 23, 1870

==== Missouri ====
▌1. Carl Schurz (R)
▌3. Charles D. Drake (R), until December 19, 1870

▌Daniel T. Jewett (R), December 19, 1870 – January 20, 1871
▌Francis P. Blair Jr. (D), from January 20, 1871

==== Nebraska ====
▌1. Thomas Tipton (R)
▌2. John M. Thayer (R)

==== Nevada ====
▌1. William M. Stewart (R)
▌3. James W. Nye (R)

==== New Hampshire ====
▌2. Aaron H. Cragin (R)
▌3. James W. Patterson (R)

==== New Jersey ====
▌1. John P. Stockton (D)
▌2. Alexander G. Cattell (R)

==== New York ====
▌1. Reuben E. Fenton (R)
▌3. Roscoe Conkling (R)

==== North Carolina ====
▌2. Joseph C. Abbott (R)
▌3. John Pool (R)

==== Ohio ====
▌1. Allen G. Thurman (D)
▌3. John Sherman (R)

==== Oregon ====
▌2. George H. Williams (R)
▌3. Henry W. Corbett (R)

==== Pennsylvania ====
▌1. John Scott (R)
▌3. Simon Cameron (R)

==== Rhode Island ====
▌1. William Sprague IV (R)
▌2. Henry B. Anthony (R)

==== South Carolina ====
▌2. Thomas J. Robertson (R)
▌3. Frederick A. Sawyer (R)

==== Tennessee ====
▌1. William G. Brownlow (R)
▌2. Joseph S. Fowler (R)

==== Texas ====
▌1. James W. Flanagan (R), from March 30, 1870
▌2. Morgan C. Hamilton (R), from March 31, 1870

==== Vermont ====
▌1. George F. Edmunds (R)
▌3. Justin S. Morrill (R)

==== Virginia ====
▌1. John F. Lewis (R), from January 26, 1870
▌2. John W. Johnston (D), from January 26, 1870

==== West Virginia ====
▌1. Arthur I. Boreman (R)
▌2. Waitman T. Willey (R)

==== Wisconsin ====
▌1. Matthew H. Carpenter (R)
▌3. Timothy O. Howe (R)

Senators' party membership by state at the opening of the 41st Congress in March 1869. The senators from Georgia, Mississippi, Texas, and Virginia were not seated until later in the Congress. 2 Democrats 1 Democrat and 1 Republican 2 Republicans Territories

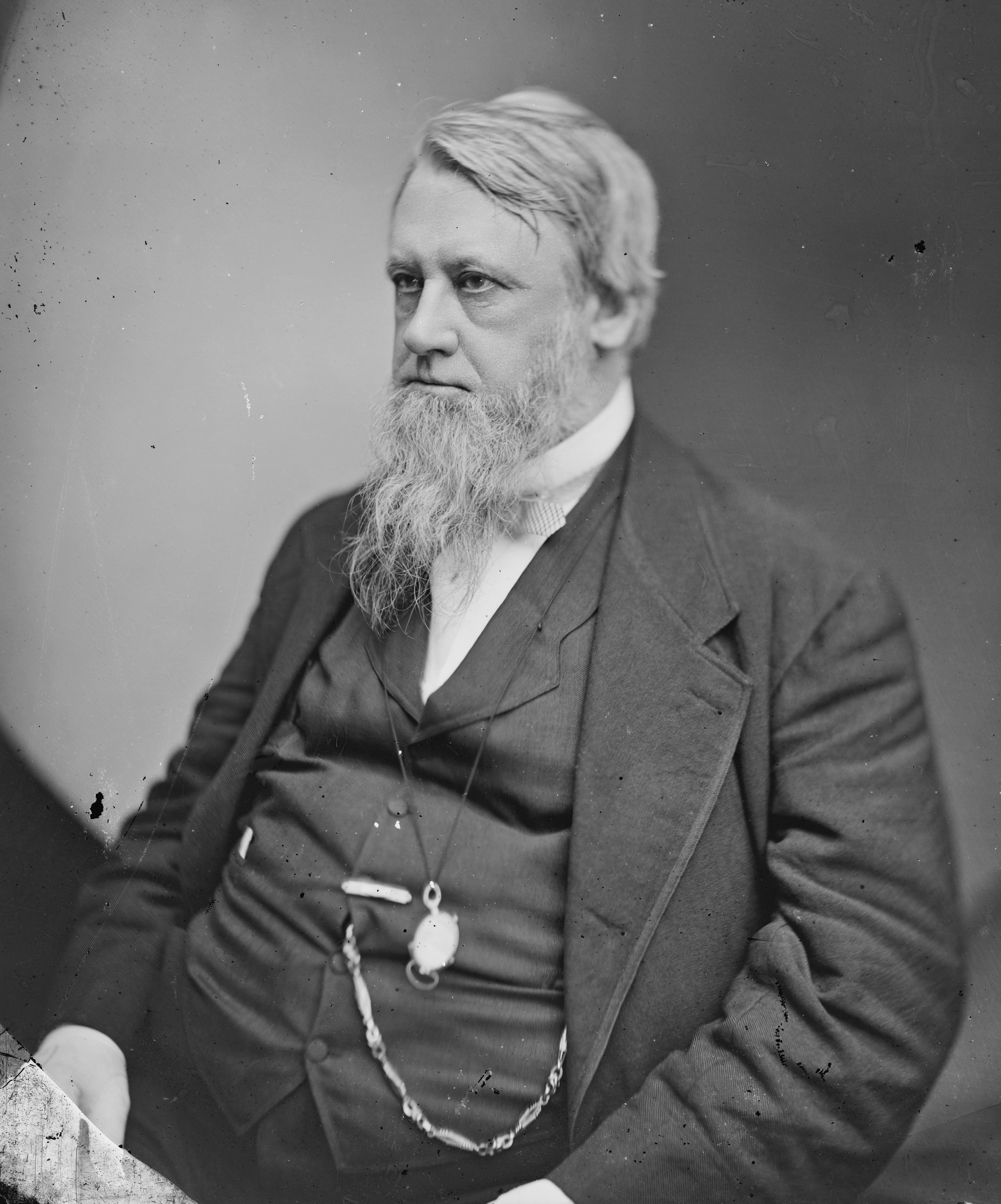
Senate President pro tempore Henry B. Anthony

=== House of Representatives ===
The names of representatives are preceded by their district numbers.

==== Alabama ====
▌1. Alfred E. Buck (R)
▌2. Charles W. Buckley (R)
▌3. Robert S. Heflin (R)
▌4. Charles Hays (R)
▌5. Peter M. Dox (D)
▌6. William C. Sherrod (D)

==== Arkansas ====
▌1. Logan H. Roots (R)
▌2. Anthony A. C. Rogers (D)
▌3. Thomas Boles (R)

==== California ====
▌1. Samuel B. Axtell (D)
▌2. Aaron A. Sargent (R)
▌3. James A. Johnson (D)

==== Connecticut ====
▌1. Julius L. Strong (R)
▌2. Stephen W. Kellogg (R)
▌3. Henry H. Starkweather (R)
▌4. William H. Barnum (D)

==== Delaware ====
▌At-large. Benjamin T. Biggs (D)

==== Florida ====
▌At-large. Charles M. Hamilton (R)

==== Georgia ====
▌1. William W. Paine (D), from December 22, 1870
▌2. Richard H. Whiteley (R), from December 22, 1870
▌3. Marion Bethune (R), from December 22, 1870
▌4. Jefferson F. Long (R), from January 16, 1871
▌5. Stephen A. Corker (D), from January 24, 1871
▌6. William P. Price (D), from December 22, 1870
▌7. Pierce M. B. Young (D), from December 22, 1870

==== Illinois ====
▌1. Norman B. Judd (R)
▌2. John F. Farnsworth (R)
▌3. Elihu B. Washburne (R), until March 6, 1869

▌Horatio C. Burchard (R), from December 6, 1869

▌4. John B. Hawley (R)
▌5. Ebon C. Ingersoll (R)
▌6. Burton C. Cook (R)
▌7. Jesse H. Moore (R)
▌8. Shelby M. Cullom (R)
▌9. Thompson W. McNeely (D)
▌10. Albert G. Burr (D)
▌11. Samuel S. Marshall (D)
▌12. John B. Hay (R)
▌13. John M. Crebs (D)
▌At-large. John A. Logan (R), until March 3, 1871

==== Indiana ====
▌1. William E. Niblack (D)
▌2. Michael C. Kerr (D)
▌3. William S. Holman (D)
▌4. George W. Julian (R)
▌5. John Coburn (R)
▌6. Daniel W. Voorhees (D)
▌7. Godlove S. Orth (R)
▌8. James N. Tyner (R)
▌9. John P. C. Shanks (R)
▌10. William Williams (R)
▌11. Jasper Packard (R)

==== Iowa ====
▌1. George W. McCrary (R)
▌2. William Smyth (R), until September 30, 1870

▌William P. Wolf (R), from December 6, 1870

▌3. William B. Allison (R)
▌4. William Loughridge (R)
▌5. Francis W. Palmer (R)
▌6. Charles Pomeroy (R)

==== Kansas ====
▌At-large. Sidney Clarke (R)

==== Kentucky ====
▌1. Lawrence S. Trimble (D)
▌2. William N. Sweeney (D)
▌3. Jacob Golladay (D), until February 28, 1870

▌Joseph H. Lewis (D), from May 10, 1870

▌4. J. Proctor Knott (D)
▌5. Boyd Winchester (D)
▌6. Thomas L. Jones (D)
▌7. James B. Beck (D)
▌8. George M. Adams (D)
▌9. John M. Rice (D)

==== Louisiana ====
▌1. J. Hale Sypher (R), from November 7, 1870
▌2. Lionel A. Sheldon (R)
▌3. Chester B. Darrall (R)
▌4. Joseph P. Newsham (R), from May 23, 1870
▌5. Frank Morey (R)

==== Maine ====
▌1. John Lynch (R)
▌2. Samuel P. Morrill (R)
▌3. James G. Blaine (R)
▌4. John A. Peters (R)
▌5. Eugene Hale (R)

==== Maryland ====
▌1. Samuel Hambleton (D)
▌2. Stevenson Archer (D)
▌3. Thomas Swann (D)
▌4. Patrick Hamill (D)
▌5. Frederick Stone (D)

==== Massachusetts ====
▌1. James Buffington (R)
▌2. Oakes Ames (R)
▌3. Ginery Twichell (R)
▌4. Samuel Hooper (R)
▌5. Benjamin F. Butler (R)
▌6. Nathaniel P. Banks (R)
▌7. George S. Boutwell (R), until March 12, 1869

▌George M. Brooks (R), from November 2, 1869

▌8. George F. Hoar (R)
▌9. William B. Washburn (R)
▌10. Henry L. Dawes (R)

==== Michigan ====
▌1. Fernando C. Beaman (R)
▌2. William L. Stoughton (R)
▌3. Austin Blair (R)
▌4. Thomas W. Ferry (R), until March 3, 1871
▌5. Omar D. Conger (R)
▌6. Randolph Strickland (R)

==== Minnesota ====
▌1. Morton S. Wilkinson (R)
▌2. Eugene M. Wilson (D)

==== Mississippi ====
▌1. George E. Harris (R), from February 23, 1870
▌2. Joseph L. Morphis (R), from February 23, 1870
▌3. Henry W. Barry (R), from April 8, 1870
▌4. George C. McKee (R), from February 23, 1870
▌5. Legrand W. Perce (R), from February 23, 1870

==== Missouri ====
▌1. Erastus Wells (D)
▌2. Gustavus A. Finkelnburg (R)
▌3. James R. McCormick (D)
▌4. Sempronius H. Boyd (R)
▌5. Samuel S. Burdett (R)
▌6. Robert T. Van Horn (R)
▌7. Joel F. Asper (R)
▌8. John F. Benjamin (R)
▌9. David P. Dyer (R)

==== Nebraska ====
▌At-large. John Taffe (R)

==== Nevada ====
▌At-large. Thomas Fitch (R)

==== New Hampshire ====
▌1. Jacob H. Ela (R)
▌2. Aaron F. Stevens (R)
▌3. Jacob Benton (R)

==== New Jersey ====
▌1. William Moore (R)
▌2. Charles Haight (D)
▌3. John T. Bird (D)
▌4. John Hill (R)
▌5. Orestes Cleveland (D)

==== New York ====
▌1. Henry A. Reeves (D)
▌2. John G. Schumaker (D)
▌3. Henry W. Slocum (D)
▌4. John Fox (D)
▌5. John Morrissey (D)
▌6. Samuel S. Cox (D)
▌7. Hervey C. Calkin (D)
▌8. James Brooks (D)
▌9. Fernando Wood (D)
▌10. Clarkson N. Potter (D)
▌11. George W. Greene (D), until February 17, 1870

▌Charles H. Van Wyck (R), from February 17, 1870

▌12. John H. Ketcham (R)
▌13. John A. Griswold (D)
▌14. Stephen L. Mayham (D)
▌15. Adolphus H. Tanner (R)
▌16. Orange Ferriss (R)
▌17. William A. Wheeler (R)
▌18. Stephen Sanford (R)
▌19. Charles Knapp (R)
▌20. Addison H. Laflin (R)
▌21. Alexander H. Bailey (R)
▌22. John C. Churchill (R)
▌23. Dennis McCarthy (R)
▌24. George W. Cowles (R)
▌25. William H. Kelsey (R)
▌26. Giles W. Hotchkiss (R)
▌27. Hamilton Ward Sr. (R)
▌28. Noah Davis (R), until July 15, 1870

▌Charles H. Holmes (R), from December 6, 1870

▌29. John Fisher (R)
▌30. David S. Bennett (R)
▌31. Porter Sheldon (R)

==== North Carolina ====
▌1. Clinton L. Cobb (R)
▌2. David Heaton (R), until June 25, 1870

▌Joseph Dixon (R), from December 5, 1870

▌3. Oliver H. Dockery (R)
▌4. John T. Deweese (R), until February 28, 1870

▌John Manning Jr. (D), from December 7, 1870

▌5. Israel G. Lash (R)
▌6. Francis E. Shober (D)
▌7. Alexander H. Jones (R)

==== Ohio ====
▌1. Peter W. Strader (D)
▌2. Job E. Stevenson (R)
▌3. Robert C. Schenck (R), until January 5, 1871
▌4. William Lawrence (R)
▌5. William Mungen (D)
▌6. John A. Smith (R)
▌7. James J. Winans (R)
▌8. John Beatty (R)
▌9. Edward F. Dickinson (D)
▌10. Truman H. Hoag (D), until February 5, 1870

▌Erasmus D. Peck (R), from April 23, 1870

▌11. John T. Wilson (R)
▌12. Philadelph Van Trump (D)
▌13. George W. Morgan (D)
▌14. Martin Welker (R)
▌15. Eliakim H. Moore (R)
▌16. John Bingham (R)
▌17. Jacob A. Ambler (R)
▌18. William H. Upson (R)
▌19. James A. Garfield (R)

==== Oregon ====
▌At-large. Joseph S. Smith (D)

==== Pennsylvania ====
▌1. Samuel J. Randall (D)
▌2. Charles O'Neill (R)
▌3. John Moffet (D), until April 9, 1869

▌Leonard Myers (R), from April 9, 1869

▌4. William D. Kelley (R)
▌5. John R. Reading (D), until April 13, 1870

▌Caleb N. Taylor (R), from April 13, 1870

▌6. John D. Stiles (D)
▌7. Washington Townsend (R)
▌8. J. Lawrence Getz (D)
▌9. Oliver J. Dickey (R)
▌10. Henry L. Cake (R)
▌11. Daniel M. Van Auken (D)
▌12. George W. Woodward (D)
▌13. Ulysses Mercur (R)
▌14. John B. Packer (R)
▌15. Richard J. Haldeman (D)
▌16. John Cessna (R)
▌17. Daniel J. Morrell (R)
▌18. William H. Armstrong (R)
▌19. Glenni W. Scofield (R)
▌20. Calvin W. Gilfillan (R)
▌21. John Covode (R), February 9, 1870 – January 11, 1871
▌22. James S. Negley (R)
▌23. Darwin Phelps (R)
▌24. Joseph B. Donley (R)

==== Rhode Island ====
▌1. Thomas A. Jenckes (R)
▌2. Nathan F. Dixon Jr. (R)

==== South Carolina ====
▌1. B. Frank Whittemore (R), until February 24, 1870

▌Joseph Rainey (R), from December 12, 1870

▌2. Christopher C. Bowen (R)
▌3. Solomon L. Hoge (R), from April 8, 1869
▌4. Alexander S. Wallace (R), from May 27, 1870

==== Tennessee ====
▌1. Roderick R. Butler (R)
▌2. Horace Maynard (R)
▌3. William B. Stokes (R)
▌4. Lewis Tillman (R)
▌5. William F. Prosser (R)
▌6. Samuel M. Arnell (R)
▌7. Isaac R. Hawkins (R)
▌8. William J. Smith (R)

==== Texas ====
▌1. George W. Whitmore (R), from March 30, 1870
▌2. John C. Conner (D), from March 31, 1870
▌3. William T. Clark (R), from March 31, 1870
▌4. Edward Degener (R), from March 31, 1870

==== Vermont ====
▌1. Charles W. Willard (R)
▌2. Luke P. Poland (R)
▌3. Worthington C. Smith (R)

==== Virginia ====
▌1. Richard S. Ayer (R), from January 31, 1870
▌2. James H. Platt Jr. (R), from January 26, 1870
▌3. Charles H. Porter (R), from January 26, 1870
▌4. George Booker (C), from January 26, 1870
▌5. Robert Ridgway (C), from January 27, 1870 – October 16, 1870

▌Richard T. W. Duke (C), from November 8, 1870

▌6. William Milnes Jr. (C), from January 27, 1870
▌7. Lewis McKenzie (C), from January 31, 1870
▌8. James K. Gibson (C), from January 28, 1870

==== West Virginia ====
▌1. Isaac H. Duval (R)
▌2. James C. McGrew (R)
▌3. John Witcher (R)

==== Wisconsin ====
▌1. Halbert E. Paine (R)
▌2. Benjamin F. Hopkins (R), until January 1, 1870

▌David Atwood (R), from February 23, 1870

▌3. Amasa Cobb (R)
▌4. Charles A. Eldredge (D)
▌5. Philetus Sawyer (R)
▌6. Cadwallader C. Washburn (R)

==== Non-voting members ====
▌Arizona Territory. Richard C. McCormick (D)
▌Colorado Territory. Allen A. Bradford (R)
▌Dakota Territory. Solomon L. Spink (R)
▌Idaho Territory. Jacob K. Shafer (D)
▌Montana Territory. James M. Cavanaugh (D)
▌New Mexico Territory. J. Francisco Chaves (R)
▌Utah Territory. William H. Hooper (D)
▌Washington Territory. Selucius Garfielde (R)
▌Wyoming Territory. Stephen F. Nuckolls (D), from December 6, 1869

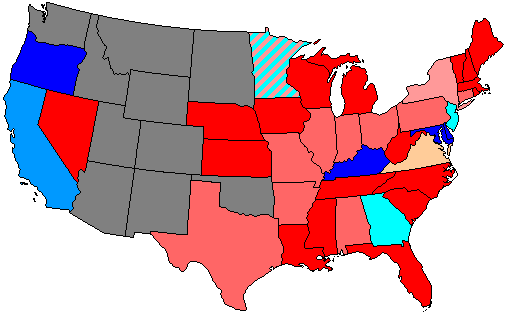
House seats by party holding plurality in state: 80+% to 100% Democratic / 80+% to 100% Republican; 60+% to 80% Democratic / 60+% to 80% Republican; Up to 60% Democratic / Up to 60% Republican

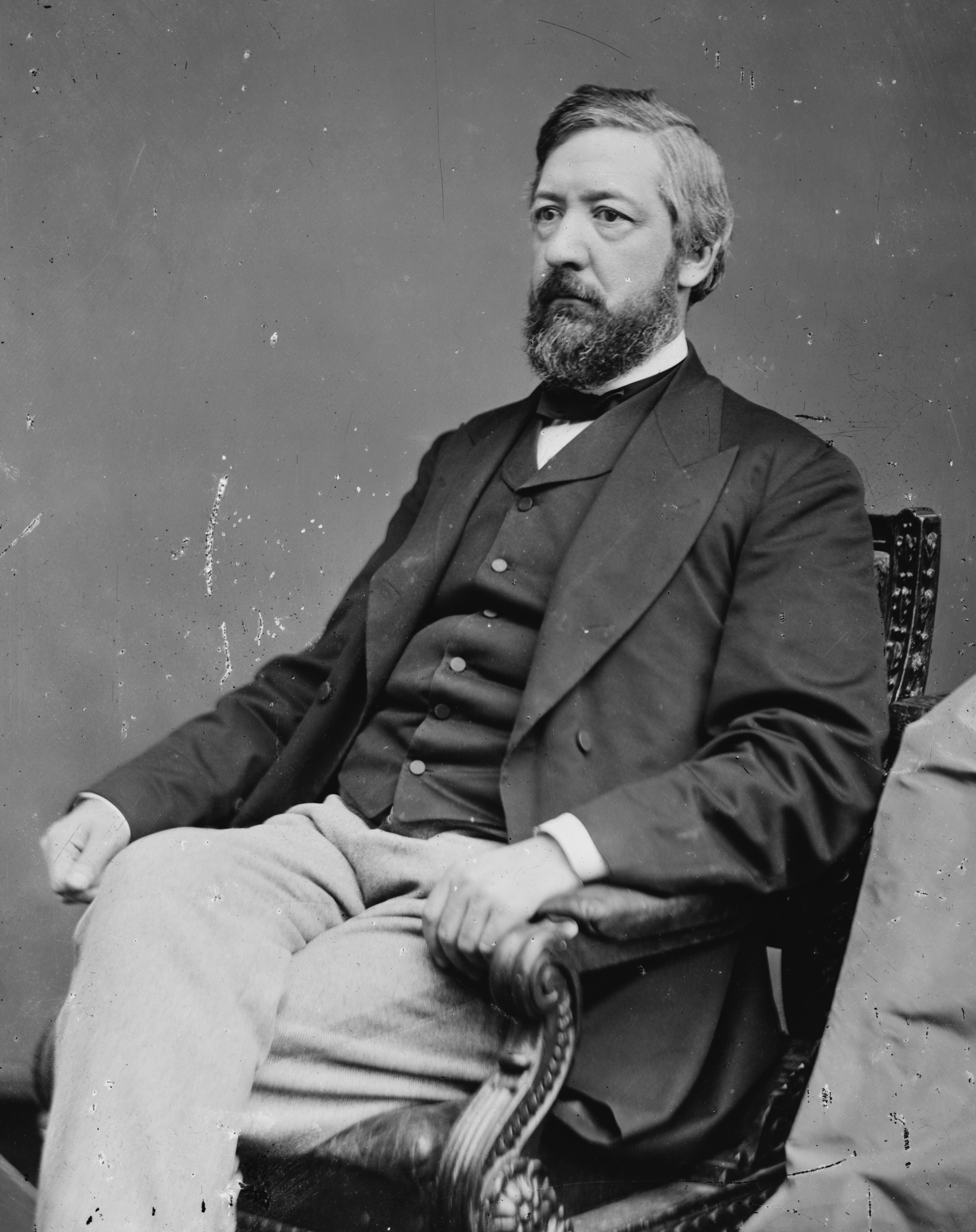
Speaker of the House, James G. Blaine

== Changes in membership ==
The count below reflects changes from the beginning of the first session of this Congress.

=== Senate ===
- Replacements: 6
  - Democratic: 1 seat net gain
  - Republican: 1 seat net loss
- Deaths: 2
- Resignations:2
- Interim appointments: 2
- Seats of newly re-admitted states: 8
- Total seats with changes: 14

Senate changes
State (class)	Vacated by	Reason for change	Successor	Date of successor's formal installation (Note: When seated or oath administered, not necessarily when service began.)
Virginia (1)	Vacant	Virginia re-admitted to the Union	John F. Lewis (R)	January 26, 1870
Virginia (2)	Vacant	Virginia re-admitted to the Union	John W. Johnston (D)	January 26, 1870
Mississippi (1)	Vacant	Mississippi re-admitted to the Union	Adelbert Ames (R)	February 23, 1870
Mississippi (2)	Vacant	Mississippi re-admitted to the Union	Hiram R Revels (R)	February 23, 1870
Texas (1)	Vacant	Texas re-admitted to the Union	James W. Flanagan (R)	March 30, 1870
Texas (2)	Vacant	Texas re-admitted to the Union	Morgan C. Hamilton (R)	March 31, 1870
Georgia (3)	Vacant	Georgia re-admitted to the Union	Joshua Hill (R)	February 1, 1871
Georgia (2)	Vacant	Georgia re-admitted to the Union	Homer V. M. Miller (D)	February 28, 1871
Maine (2)	William P. Fessenden (R)	Died September 8, 1869. Successor appointed October 30, 1869. Successor was subsequently elected January 19, 1870 to finish the term.	Lot M. Morrill (R)	October 30, 1869
Iowa (2)	James W. Grimes (R)	Resigned December 6, 1869, because of failing health. Successor elected January 18, 1870.	James B. Howell (R)	January 18, 1870
Minnesota (2)	Daniel S. Norton (R)	Died July 14, 1870. Successor appointed July 15, 1870.	William Windom (R)	July 15, 1870
Missouri (3)	Charles D. Drake (R)	Resigned December 19, 1870, after being appointed chief justice of the United States Court of Claims. Successor appointed December 19, 1870.	Daniel T. Jewett (R)	December 19, 1870
Missouri (3)	Daniel T. Jewett (R)	Interim appointee retired. Successor elected January 20, 1871.	Francis P. Blair Jr. (D)	January 20, 1871
Minnesota (2)	William Windom (R)	Successor elected January 22, 1871.	Ozora P. Stearns (R)	January 22, 1871

=== House of Representatives ===
- Replacements: 14
  - Democratic: 3 seat net loss
  - Republican: 3 seat net gain
  - Conservative Party of Virginia: no net change
- Deaths: 6
- Resignations: 6
- Contested election: 8
- Seats of newly re-admitted states: 17
- Total seats with changes: 44

House changes
District	Vacated by	Reason for change	Successor	Date of successor's formal installation
South Carolina 3rd	Vacant	Contested election with J.P. Reed. Reed was never seated. House declared Hoge entitled to seat.	Solomon L. Hoge (R)	April 8, 1869
Wyoming Territory At-large	Vacant	Territory organized in previous congress and remained vacant until December 6, 1869	Stephen F. Nuckolls (D)	December 6, 1869
Virginia 2nd	Vacant	Virginia re-admitted into the Union	James H. Platt Jr. (R)	January 26, 1870
Virginia 3rd	Vacant	Virginia re-admitted into the Union	Charles H. Porter (R)	January 26, 1870
Virginia 4th	Vacant	Virginia re-admitted into the Union	George Booker (C)	January 26, 1870
Virginia 5th	Vacant	Virginia re-admitted into the Union	Robert Ridgway (C)	January 27, 1870
Virginia 6th	Vacant	Virginia re-admitted into the Union	William Milnes Jr. (C)	January 27, 1870
Virginia 8th	Vacant	Virginia re-admitted into the Union	James K. Gibson (C)	January 28, 1870
Virginia 1st	Vacant	Virginia re-admitted into the Union	Richard S. Ayer (R)	January 31, 1870
Virginia 7th	Vacant	Virginia re-admitted into the Union	Lewis McKenzie (C)	January 31, 1870
Pennsylvania 21st	Vacant	Contested election with Henry D. Foster. House declared neither was entitled to seat. House then declared Covode duly elected February 9, 1870	John Covode (R)	February 9, 1870
Mississippi 1st	Vacant	Mississippi re-admitted into the Union	George E. Harris (R)	February 23, 1870
Mississippi 2nd	Vacant	Mississippi re-admitted into the Union	Joseph L. Morphis (R)	February 23, 1870
Mississippi 3rd	Vacant	Mississippi re-admitted into the Union	Henry W. Barry (R)	February 23, 1870
Mississippi 4th	Vacant	Mississippi re-admitted into the Union	George C. McKee (R)	February 23, 1870
Mississippi 5th	Vacant	Mississippi re-admitted into the Union	Legrand W. Perce (R)	February 23, 1870
Texas 1st	Vacant	Texas re-admitted into the Union	George W. Whitmore (R)	March 30, 1870
Texas 2nd	Vacant	Texas re-admitted into the Union	John C. Conner (D)	March 31, 1870
Texas 3rd	Vacant	Texas re-admitted into the Union	William T. Clark (R)	March 31, 1870
Texas 4th	Vacant	Texas re-admitted into the Union	Edward Degener (R)	March 31, 1870
Louisiana 4th	Vacant	Contested election with Michael Ryan. House declared neither was entitled to seat. Elected to seat thus caused	Joseph P. Newsham (R)	May 23, 1870
South Carolina 4th	Vacant	Contested election with William D. Simpson. Simpson was never seated. House declared Wallace entitled to seat.	Alexander S. Wallace (R)	May 27, 1870
Louisiana 1st	Vacant	Contested election with Louis St. Martin. House declared neither was entitled to seat. Elected to seat thus caused	J. Hale Sypher (R)	November 7, 1870
Georgia 1st	Vacant	Vacancy caused by House declaring Joseph W. Clift not entitled to seat	William W. Paine (D)	December 22, 1870
Georgia 2nd	Vacant	Vacancy caused by House declaring Nelson Tift not entitled to seat	Richard H. Whiteley (R)	December 22, 1870
Georgia 3rd	Vacant	Vacancy caused by House declaring William P. Edwards not entitled to seat	Marion Bethune (R)	December 22, 1870
Georgia 4th	Vacant	Vacancy caused by House declaring Samuel F. Gove not entitled to seat	Jefferson F. Long (R)	December 22, 1870
Georgia 5th	Vacant	Vacancy caused by House declaring Charles H. Prince not entitled to seat	Stephen A. Corker (D)	December 22, 1870
Georgia 6th	Vacant	Failure to elect	William P. Price (D)	December 22, 1870
Georgia 7th	Vacant	Vacancy caused by House declaring Pierce M. B. Young not entitled to seat. He was subsequently elected to fill the vacancy thus caused	Pierce M. B. Young (D)	December 22, 1870
Illinois 3rd	Elihu B. Washburne (R)	Resigned March 6, 1869, after being appointed United States Secretary of State	Horatio C. Burchard (R)	December 6, 1869
Massachusetts 7th	George S. Boutwell (R)	Resigned March 12, 1869, after being appointed United States Secretary of the Treasury	George M. Brooks (R)	November 2, 1869
Pennsylvania 3rd	John Moffet (D)	Lost contested election April 9, 1869	Leonard Myers (R)	April 9, 1869
Wisconsin 2nd	Benjamin F. Hopkins (R)	Died January 1, 1870	David Atwood (R)	February 23, 1870
Ohio 10th	Truman H. Hoag (D)	Died February 5, 1870	Erasmus D. Peck (R)	April 23, 1870
New York 11th	George W. Greene (D)	Lost contested election February 17, 1870	Charles Van Wyck (R)	February 17, 1870
South Carolina 1st	Benjamin F. Whittemore (R)	Resigned February 24, 1870, pending an investigation of certain appointments to the US Military and Naval Academies	Joseph Rainey (R)	December 12, 1870
Kentucky 3rd	Jacob Golladay (D)	Resigned February 28, 1870	Joseph H. Lewis (D)	May 10, 1870
North Carolina 4th	John T. Deweese (R)	Resigned February 28, 1870, pending an investigation of certain appointments to the US Military and Naval Academies	John Manning Jr. (D)	December 7, 1870
Pennsylvania 5th	John R. Reading (D)	Lost contested election April 13, 1870	Caleb N. Taylor (R)	April 13, 1870
North Carolina 2nd	David Heaton (R)	Died June 25, 1870	Joseph Dixon (R)	December 5, 1870
New York 28th	Noah Davis (R)	Resigned July 15, 1870, before being appointed U.S. Attorney for the Southern District of New York	Charles H. Holmes (R)	December 6, 1870
Iowa 2nd	William Smyth (R)	Died September 30, 1870	William P. Wolf (R)	December 6, 1870
Virginia 5th	Robert Ridgway (C)	Died October 16, 1870	Richard T. W. Duke (C)	November 8, 1870
Ohio 3rd	Robert C. Schenck (R)	Resigned January 5, 1871, after being appointed U.S. Ambassador to the United Kingdom	Vacant	Not filled this Congress
Pennsylvania 21st	John Covode (R)	Died January 11, 1871	Vacant	Not filled this Congress
Illinois At-large	John A. Logan (R)	Resigned at end of congress March 3, 1871, after being elected to the US Senate for the following term	Vacant	Not filled this Congress
Michigan 4th	Thomas W. Ferry (R)	Resigned at end of congress March 3, 1871, after being elected to the US Senate for the following term	Vacant	Not filled this Congress

== Committees ==
Lists of committees and their party leaders for members of the House and Senate committees can be found through the Official Congressional Directory at the bottom of this article. The directory after the pages of terms of service lists committees of the Senate, House (Standing with Subcommittees, Select and Special) and Joint and, after that, House/Senate committee assignments. On the committees section of the House and Senate in the Official Congressional Directory, the committee's members on the first row on the left side shows the chairman of the committee and on the right side shows the ranking member of the committee.

=== Senate ===
- Agriculture (Chairman: Simon Cameron; Ranking Member: Abijah Gilbert)
- Appropriations (Chairman: Lot M. Morrill; Ranking Member: William Sprague IV)
- Audit and Control the Contingent Expenses of the Senate (Chairman: Orris S. Ferry; Ranking Member: Garrett Davis)
- Claims (Chairman: Timothy O. Howe; Ranking Member: Thomas J. Robertson)
- Commerce (Chairman: Zachariah Chandler; Ranking Member: Roscoe Conkling)
- Distributing Public Revenue Among the States (Select)
- District of Columbia (Chairman: James W. Patterson; Ranking Member: John S. Harris)
- Education (Chairman: Frederick A. Sawyer; Ranking Member: Henry W. Corbett)
- Engrossed Bills (Chairman: William A. Buckingham; Ranking Member: Daniel S. Norton)
- Finance (Chairman: John Sherman; Ranking Member: Willard Warner)
- Foreign Relations (Chairman: Charles Sumner; Ranking Member: Oliver P. Morton)
- Indian Affairs (Chairman: James Harlan; Ranking Member: William A. Buckingham)
- Judiciary (Chairman: Lyman Trumbull; Ranking Member: Benjamin F. Rice)
- Manufactures (Chairman: Oliver P. Morton; Ranking Member: Arthur I. Boreman)
- Memorial of Davis Hatch (Select)
- Military Affairs and the Militia (Chairman: Henry Wilson; Ranking Member: John M. Thayer)
- Mines and Mining (Chairman: William M. Stewart; Ranking Member: Edmund G. Ross)
- Mississippi River Levee System (Select)
- Naval Affairs (Chairman: Aaron H. Cragin; Ranking Member: Charles D. Drake)
- Ordnance and War Ships (Select)
- Outrages in Southern States (Select)
- Pacific Railroad (Chairman: Jacob M. Howard; Ranking Member: Charles D. Drake)
- Patents (Chairman: Waitman T. Willey; Ranking Member: Thomas W. Osborn)
- Pensions (Chairman: George F. Edmunds; Ranking Member: William G. Brownlow)
- Post Office and Post Roads (Chairman: Alexander Ramsey; Ranking Member: Cornelius Cole)
- Private Land Claims (Chairman: George H. Williams; Ranking Member: William P. Kellogg)
- Public Buildings and Grounds (Chairman: Justin S. Morrill; Ranking Member: Adolphus H. Tanner)
- Public Lands (Chairman: Samuel C. Pomeroy; Ranking Member: Willard Warner)
- Removal of Political Disabilities (Select) (Chairman: Henry B. Anthony; Ranking Member: Orris S. Ferry)
- Retrenchment (Chairman: John S. Harris; Ranking Member: Carl Schurz)
- Revision of the Laws (Chairman: Roscoe Conkling; Ranking Member: John Pool)
- Revolutionary Claims (Chairman: Richard Yates; Ranking Member: William G. Brownlow)
- Rules (Select)
- Tariff Regulation (Select)
- Territories (Chairman: James W. Nye; Ranking Member: Jacob M. Howard)
- Traffic with Rebels in Texas (Select)
- Whole

=== House of Representatives ===
- Accounts (Chairman: Henry L. Cake; Ranking Member: Aaron A. Sargent)
- Agriculture (Chairman: John T. Wilson; Ranking Member: Jacob Benton)
- Appropriations (Chairman: Henry L. Dawes; Ranking Member: Aaron A. Sargent)
- Banking and Currency (Chairman: James A. Garfield; Ranking Member: John B. Packer)
- Claims (Chairman: William B. Washburn; Ranking Member: Jacob H. Ela)
- Coinage, Weights and Measures (Chairman: William D. Kelley; Ranking Member: Noah Davis)
- Commerce (Chairman: Nathan F. Dixon; Ranking Member: David S. Bennett)
- District of Columbia (Chairman: Burton C. Cook; Ranking Member: Charles M. Hamilton)
- Education and Labor (Chairman: Samuel M. Arnell; Ranking Member: Samuel S. Burdett)
- Elections (Chairman: Halbert E. Paine; Ranking Member: Job E. Stevenson)
- Expenditures in the Interior Department (Chairman: Jacob H. Ela; Ranking Member: Peter W. Strader)
- Expenditures in the Navy Department (Chairman: John Lynch; Ranking Member: Patrick Hamill)
- Expenditures in the Post Office Department (Chairman: William Moore; Ranking Member: John F. Benjamin)
- Expenditures in the State Department (Chairman: Alexander H. Bailey; Ranking Member: John D. Stiles)
- Expenditures in the Treasury Department (Chairman: William B. Allison; Ranking Member: Samuel J. Randall)
- Expenditures in the War Department (Chairman: William Williams; Ranking Member: Clinton L. Cobb)
- Expenditures on Public Buildings (Chairman: John C. Churchill; Ranking Member: Truman H. Hoag)
- Freedmen's Affairs (Chairman: Oliver H. Dockery; Ranking Member: John B. Hawley)
- Foreign Affairs (Chairman: Nathaniel P. Banks; Ranking Member: Charles W. Willard)
- Indian Affairs (Chairman: Sidney Clarke; Ranking Member: John T. Deweese)
- Invalid Pensions (Chairman: John F. Benjamin; Ranking Member: Christopher C. Bowen)
- Judiciary (Chairman: John A. Bingham; Ranking Member: Ulysses Mercur)
- Manufactures (Chairman: Daniel J. Morrell; Ranking Member: William H. Upson)
- Mileage (Chairman: Isaac R. Hawkins; Ranking Member: Job E. Stevenson)
- Military Affairs (Chairman: John A. Logan; Ranking Member: John S. Witcher)
- Militia (Chairman: John P. C. Shanks; Ranking Member: Eliakim H. Moore)
- Mines and Mining (Chairman: Orange Ferriss; Ranking Member: Isaac H. Duval)
- Naval Affairs (Chairman: Glenni W. Scofield; Ranking Member: George W. McCrary)
- Pacific Railroads (Chairman: William A. Wheeler; Ranking Member: Logan H. Roots)
- Patents (Chairman: Thomas A. Jenckes; Ranking Member: James A. Johnson)
- Post Office and Post Roads (Chairman: John F. Farnsworth; Ranking Member: James N. Tyner)
- Private Land Claims (Chairman: Godlove Stein Orth; Ranking Member: Cadwallader C. Washburn)
- Public Buildings and Grounds (Chairman: John Beatty)
- Public Expenditures (Chairman: John Coburn)
- Public Lands (Chairman: George W. Julian; Ranking Member: James J. Winans)
- Railways and Canals (Chairman: Ebon C. Ingersoll; Ranking Member: William F. Prosser)
- Revision of Laws (Chairman: Luke P. Poland; Ranking Member: George F. Hoar)
- Revolutionary Claims (Chairman: Sempronius H. Boyd; Ranking Member: Alexander H. Jones)
- Revolutionary Pensions and War of 1812 (Chairman: Charles W. Willard; Ranking Member: Roderick R. Butler)
- Rules (Select) (Chairman: Schuyler Colfax; Ranking Member: James A. Garfield)
- Standards of Official Conduct
- Territories (Chairman: Shelby M. Cullom; Ranking Member: Eliakim H. Moore)
- Ways and Means (Chairman: Samuel Hooper; Ranking Member: James Brooks)
- Whole

=== Joint committees ===
- Conditions of Indian Tribes (Special)
- Enrolled Bills (Chairman: Rep. John Beatty; Vice Chairman: Rep. Joseph C. Abbott)
- The Library (Chairman: Rep. John A. Peters; Vice Chairman: Rep. George A. Woodward)
- Printing (Chairman: Rep. Addison H. Laflin; Vice Chairman: Rep. William Mungen)
- Retrenchment (Chairman: Rep. Martin Welker; Vice Chairman: Rep. Thomas A. Jenckes)

== Caucuses ==
- Democratic (House)
- Democratic (Senate)

== Employees ==
=== Legislative branch agency directors ===
- Architect of the Capitol: Edward Clark
- Librarian of Congress: Ainsworth Rand Spofford

=== Senate ===
- Chaplain: John P. Newman (Methodist)
- Secretary: George C. Gorham
- Sergeant at Arms: George T. Brown, until March 22, 1869
  - John R. French, elected March 22, 1869

=== House of Representatives ===
- Chaplain: John G. Butler (Presbyterian)
- Clerk: Edward McPherson
- Clerk at the Speaker's Table: John M. Barclay
- Doorkeeper: Otis S. Buxton
- Postmaster: William S. King
- Reading Clerks: Charles N. Clisbee (D) and William K. Mehaffey (R)
- Sergeant at Arms: Nehemiah G. Ordway

== See also ==
- 1868 United States elections (elections leading to this Congress)
  - 1868 United States presidential election
  - 1868–69 United States Senate elections
  - 1868–69 United States House of Representatives elections
- 1870 United States elections (elections during this Congress, leading to the next Congress)
  - 1870–71 United States Senate elections
  - 1870–71 United States House of Representatives elections

== Bibliography ==
- Martis, Kenneth C. (1989). The Historical Atlas of Political Parties in the United States Congress. New York: Macmillan Publishing Company.
- Martis, Kenneth C. (1982). The Historical Atlas of United States Congressional Districts. New York: Macmillan Publishing Company.
