= New Bern National Cemetery =

Historic veterans cemetery in Craven County, North Carolina

- U.S. National Register of Historic Places
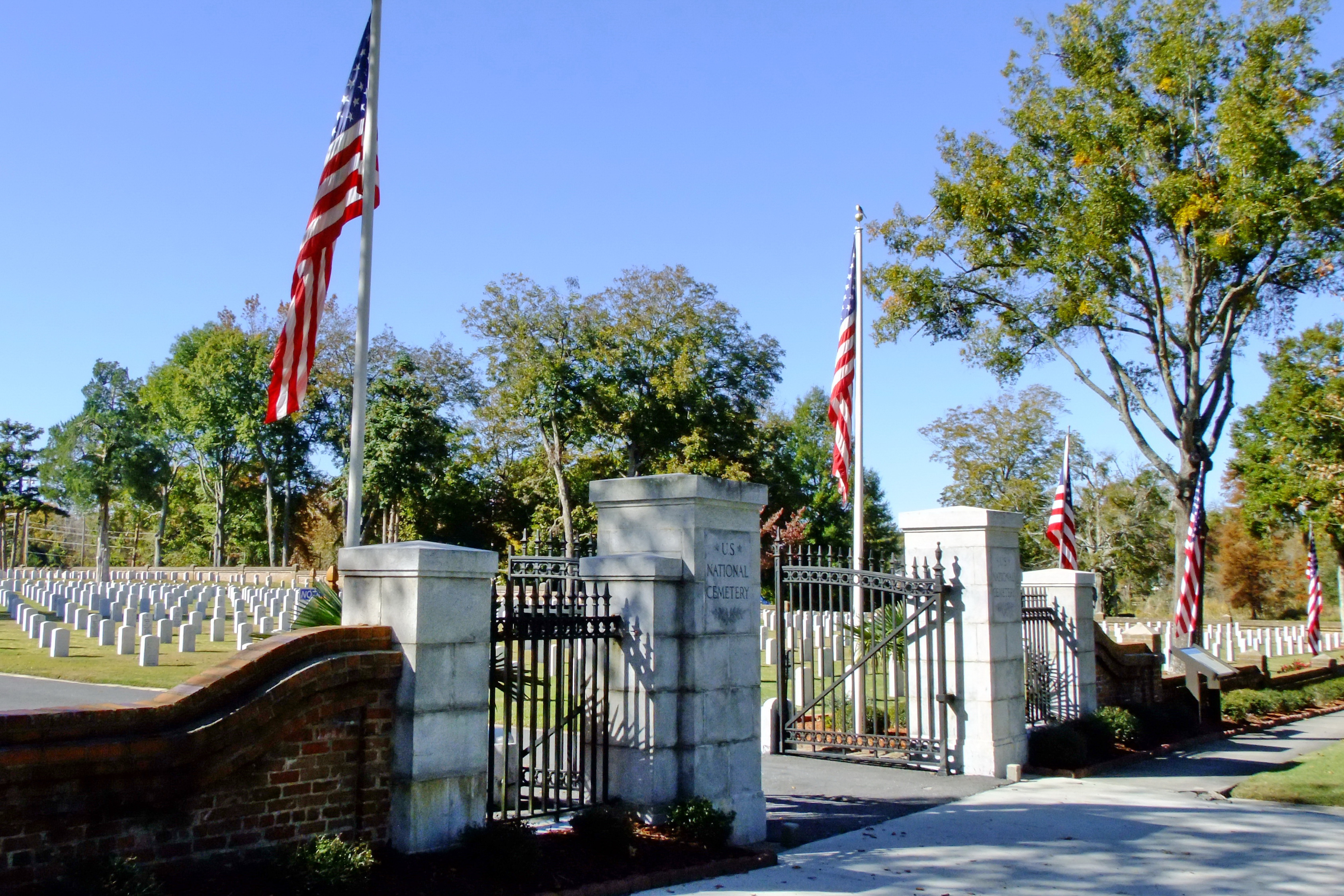

- Location within North Carolina Location within the United States
- Location: 1711 National Ave., New Bern, North Carolina
- Coordinates: 35°07′26″N 77°03′12″W
- Area: 7.7 acres (3.1 ha)
- Built: 1867
- Architectural style: Bungalow/craftsman
- MPS: Civil War Era National Cemeteries MPS
- NRHP reference No.: 97000023
- Added to NRHP: January 31, 1997

New Bern National Cemetery is a United States National Cemetery located in the city of New Bern, in Craven County, North Carolina. Administered by the United States Department of Veterans Affairs, it encompasses 7.7 acres (3.1 ha), and as of the end of 2005, had 7,517 interments. It is currently closed to new interments.

== History ==
First established on February 1, 1867, New Bern National Cemetery was initially used to reinter remains from the numerous battlefield cemeteries around the area, including nearly 1,000 unknown soldiers and the remains of Union soldiers who died at the Battle of New Bern.

New Bern National Cemetery was listed on the National Register of Historic Places in 1997.

== Notable monuments ==
- The 9th New Jersey Infantry Monument, a granite monument erected in 1905
- The Massachusetts Civil War Monument, a granite monument erected in 1908
- The Connecticut Monument, erected in 1908
- The Rhode Island Civil War Monument, a granite monument with a bronze statue on it, dedicated in 1909

== Notable interments ==
- David Heaton (1823–1870), attorney, politician, and US Representative
