= John S. Bigby =

American politician (1832–1898)

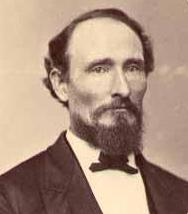

Member of the U.S. House of Representatives from Georgia's 3rd district
- In office March 4, 1871 – March 3, 1873
- Preceded by: Marion Bethune
- Succeeded by: Philip Cook

Personal details
- Born: John Summerfield Bigby; February 13, 1832 near Newnan, Georgia, U.S.
- Died: March 28, 1898 (aged 66) Atlanta, Georgia, U.S.
- Resting place: Westview Cemetery
- Party: Republican

John Summerfield Bigby (February 13, 1832 – March 28, 1898) was a 19th-century lawyer, jurist and politician who served one term as a Republican United States Representative from Georgia from 1871 to 1873.

== Biography ==
Born near Newnan, Georgia, Bigby attended the common schools. He graduated from Emory College in Oxford, Georgia in 1853. He studied law and was admitted to the bar in 1856 and commenced practice in Newnan, Georgia.

He served as member of the State constitutional conventions of 1867–1868. He served as solicitor general of the Tallapoosa circuit from August 1867 to September 22, 1868. He served as judge of the superior court of the same circuit from September 22, 1868, to March 3, 1871.

=== Congress ===
Bigby was elected as a Republican to the Forty-second Congress (March 4, 1871 – March 3, 1873). In Congress, he voted for the Ku Klux Klan Act, which was intended to enforce restrictions on racially-motivated violence committed by private citizens. He was an unsuccessful candidate for reelection in 1872 to the 43rd Congress.

=== Later career ===
After serving in Congress, Bigby resumed the practice of law in Atlanta, Georgia. He served as delegate to the 1876 Republican National Convention. He became president of the Atlanta & West Point Railroad in 1876.

=== Death and burial ===
He died in Atlanta, Georgia, March 28, 1898 and was interred there in Westview Cemetery.

U.S. House of Representatives
Preceded by Marion Bethune	Member of the U.S. House of Representatives from Georgia's 3rd congressional district March 4, 1871 – March 3, 1873	Succeeded by Philip Cook (general)
