= Erasmus D. Peck =

American politician

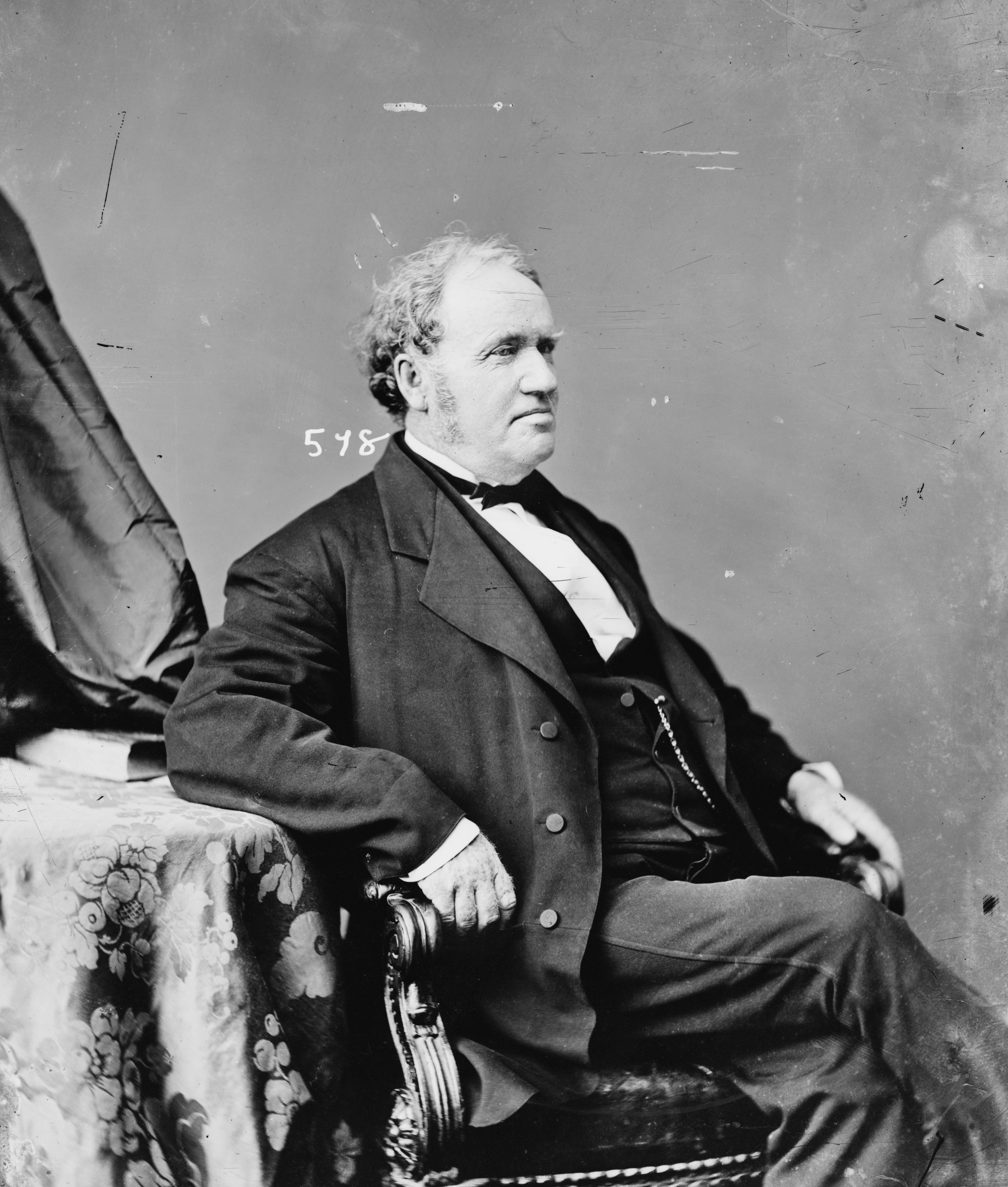

Member of the U.S. House of Representatives from Ohio's 10th district
- In office April 23, 1870 – March 3, 1873
- Preceded by: Truman H. Hoag
- Succeeded by: Charles Foster

Member of the Ohio House of Representatives from the Wood County district
- In office January 7, 1856 – January 1, 1860
- Preceded by: Addison Smith
- Succeeded by: William S. Wood

Personal details
- Born: Erasmus Darwin Peck; September 16, 1808 Stafford, Connecticut
- Died: December 25, 1876 (aged 68) Perrysburg, Ohio
- Resting place: Fort Meigs Cemetery
- Party: Republican
- Education: Yale Medical School

Erasmus Darwin Peck (September 16, 1808 – December 25, 1876) was an American physician and politician who served two terms as a U.S. representative from Ohio from 1870 to 1873.

== Biography ==
Born in Stafford, Connecticut, Peck attended the common schools of Monson, Massachusetts and graduated from the medical department of Yale College in 1829. He moved to Portage County, Ohio in 1830 and later to Perrysburg, Ohio to practice medicine. He served as member of the Ohio House of Representatives from 1856 to 1859.

=== Congress ===
Peck was elected as a Republican to the Forty-first Congress to fill the vacancy caused by the death of Truman H. Hoag. He was reelected to the Forty-second Congress and served from April 23, 1870, to March 3, 1873.

He did not seek renomination in 1872.

=== Later career and death ===
He practiced medicine in Perrysburg, Ohio until his death there December 25, 1876. He is interred in Fort Meigs Cemetery.

== Sources ==
- United States Congress. "Erasmus D. Peck (id: P000175)". Biographical Directory of the United States Congress.

U.S. House of Representatives
Preceded by Truman H. Hoag	Member of the U.S. House of Representatives from Ohio's 10th congressional district April 23, 1870–March 3, 1873	Succeeded by Charles Foster
