= James Mitchell Ashley =

American politician (1824–1896)

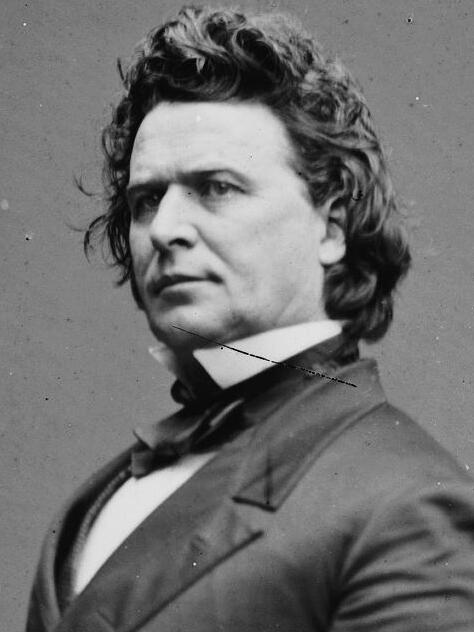
- Ashley, c. 1860–1865

3rd Governor of the Montana Territory
- In office April 9, 1869 – July 12, 1870
- Preceded by: Green Clay Smith
- Succeeded by: Wiley Scribner (acting)

Member of the U.S. House of Representatives from Ohio
- In office March 4, 1859 – March 3, 1869
- Preceded by: Richard Mott
- Succeeded by: Truman H. Hoag
- Constituency: 5th district (1859–1863); 10th district (1863–1869)

Personal details
- Born: November 14, 1824 Allegheny County, Pennsylvania
- Died: September 16, 1896 (aged 71) Ann Arbor, Michigan
- Resting place: Woodlawn Cemetery (Toledo, Ohio)
- Party: Republican
- Spouse: Emma Smith
- Children: 4

James Mitchell Ashley (November 14, 1824 – September 16, 1896) was an American politician and abolitionist. A member of the Republican Party, Ashley served as a member of the United States House of Representatives from Ohio during the American Civil War, where he became a leader of the Radical Republicans and authored the Thirteenth Amendment, which ended slavery in the United States. He also authored the resolution that started the first impeachment inquiry against Andrew Johnson. After the war, he served as governor of Montana Territory and president of the Ann Arbor Railroad.

== Early and family life ==
Ashley was born in Allegheny County, Pennsylvania, to John Ashley, a bookbinder and Campbellite preacher who evangelized in Kentucky and West Virginia, and his wife. Mary A. (Kilpatrick) Ashley of Kentucky. As a boy in the Ohio River Valley, Ashley saw coffles of chained slaves being walked to the Deep South, boys his own age being sold, and even white men who refused to let their cattle drink from a stream in which his father had baptized slaves. He grew to hate the "peculiar institution," which he considered a violation of Christian principles, and the oligarchy that supported it.

Ashley was mostly self-taught in elementary subjects, although his father wanted him to follow family tradition and become a Baptist minister. Rather than attend a seminary, the 14-year-old ran away to become a cabin boy on Ohio and Mississippi River boats and later worked as a clerk on those boats. Ashley had begun helping slaves escape as early as 1839, and late in his life, he relished telling stories of the families he had saved as a 17-year-old. He told the story later in life, which came down through the family, that when he left the home at 14, the last words that his father said to him as he went off were "You're on the straight road to Hell, boy!" Twenty years later, when he was elected to the U.S. House of Representatives, his first act after he had sat down in his office in Washington, D.C., was to pen his father to whom he had not spoken in twenty years, a letter on congressional stationery: "Dear Father, I have just arrived!"

He married Emma Jane Smith in 1851, and together, they had four children. He is the great-grandfather of U.S. Representative Thomas W. L. Ashley and a number of other direct descendants, including two James Ashley IVs, a portraitist living in Chicago, and another James Harry Ashley-Bach, born in London, United Kingdom.

Ashley was a Freemason, belonging to the Toledo Lodge No. 144 in Toledo, Ohio.

== Early political activism ==
In 1848, the burly six-foot tall youth settled in Portsmouth, Ohio, where he became a journalist, first at the Portsmouth Dispatch and later editor of the Portsmouth Democrat. The following year, he was admitted to the Ohio Bar but did not practice. Instead, by 1851, abolitionist activities had caused Ashley and his wife to flee north to Toledo to avoid prosecution under the Fugitive Slave Act of 1850. There, Ashley opened a drug store, which was soon burned down. He also became involved in the new Republican Party, campaigned for its presidential candidate John C. Fremont, and for Congressman Richard Mott.

Ashley was an active abolitionist, who traveled with John Brown's wife to Brown's execution in December, 1859, and reported the event in the still-extant local newspaper, the Toledo Blade. In 1858, he led the Ohio Republican Party. As the year ended, Ashley was elected to U.S. House of Representatives of the 36th United States Congress, and took office the following year.

== Congressional career ==
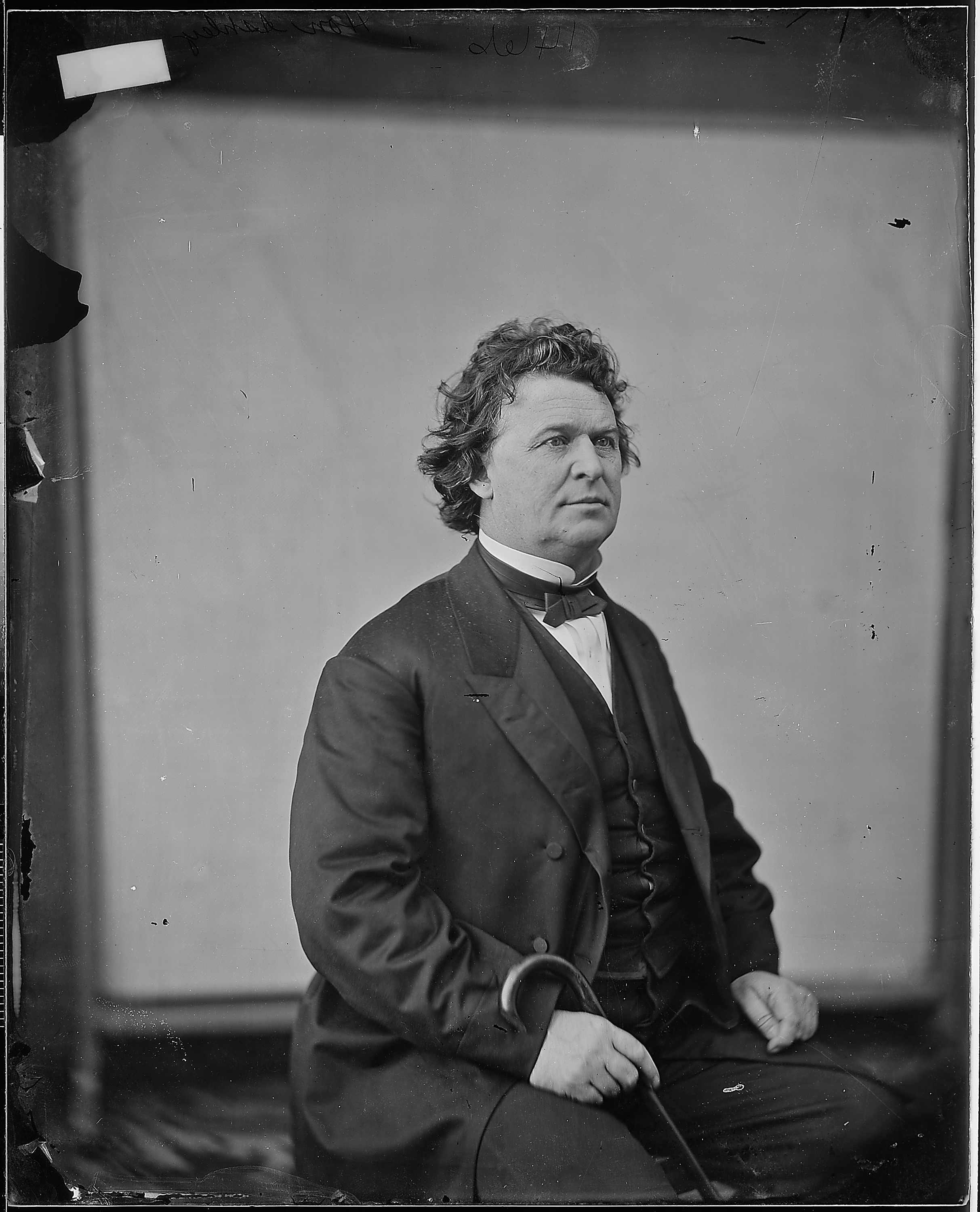
Ashley

Ashley served in the U.S House of Representatives from 1859 to 1869, representing Ohio's 5th congressional district for two terms (1859–1863) and Ohio's 10th congressional district for three terms (1863–1869). In early 1860, during the secession crisis, Ashley accused the Slave Power of plotting to destroy the Union: “They care nothing for the Union, except so far as it subserves their purpose of building up and extending their peculiar institution, and perpetuating their own political power.” Ashley advanced the Radical Republican view that the impoverished, non-slaveholding whites formed a social group antagonistic to the well-to-do planters and therefore “the real point of danger to the ruling class of the South.”

While in Congress (37th to 40th Sessions), Ashley served as the Chairman of the Committee on Territories, and was instrumental to the creation, naming, and borders, of Montana, Idaho, Wyoming, and Washington Territories. He also authored the Arizona Organic Act. However, he opposed the Church of Jesus Christ of Latter-day Saints, especially its polygamy, and limited Utah's boundaries to reduce Mormon influence. He also authored both Pacific Railroad Acts 1862 and 1864, enabling the construction of the transcontinental railroad.

During the American Civil War, Ashley took an active role in supporting the recruitment of troops for the Union Army. He also became a leader among the Radical Republicans and wrote a bill to abolish slavery in the District of Columbia in 1862. In 1863 he introduced a bill to create a constitutional amendment to end slavery. Ultimately, with Ashley as House Majority floor manager, it passed in the House and exceeded the needed a two-thirds margin by merely two votes on January 31, 1865. It was ultimately ratified as the Thirteenth Amendment to the United States Constitution, formally abolishing slavery in the United States.

Ashley suspected President Andrew Johnson, who succeeded Abraham Lincoln as president of complicity in President Lincoln's assassination and attempted to persuade the House Committee on the Judiciary. He described Johnson as being a" loathing incubus which has blotted our country's history." He also criticized Johnson for attempting to veto extensions of the Freedmen's Bureau, the Civil Rights Bill, and the Reconstruction Acts. He suspected Johnson's ties with southern oligarchs. Ashley was among the first to explore impeaching Johnson as president and began to desire its in late 1866. His exploration led to his authoring of a January 7, 1867 resolution that launched the first impeachment inquiry against Andrew Johnson. Thus, Ashley initiated the first official impeachment proceedings against Johnson. The inquiry led to a defeated resolution to impeach Johnson, which the House opposed on December 7, 1867. However, the following February, the House voted to impeach Johnson. Johnson was ultimately acquitted at his impeachment trial.

== Territorial Governor of Montana ==
Ashley's radical views, particularly on race, as well as his support for educational qualifications, did not endear him to voters. The Democrat candidate,Truman Hoag, defeated him by less than 1,000 votes in the 1868 election, which nearly bankrupted Ashley. However, President Ulysses Grant appointed Ashley governor of the Democratic-leaning Montana Territory, where he served fifteen months until 1870, when he was removed by Grant. Ashley's political appointments and support for public education, including that of Chinese immigrants proved unpopular in the Democratic-leaning territory.

== Railroad career ==
Ashley then returned to Toledo and became involved in the railroad business, which linked that city with northern Michigan and the Ann Arbor/Detroit area. Ashley helped build the Ann Arbor Railroad and served as its president from 1877, when he moved to Ann Arbor while two of his sons were enrolled at the University of Michigan Law School, to 1890, when his sons took over. The railroad went bankrupt in the financial crisis of 1893 but soldiered on and continues to operate today.

== Later unsuccessful campaigns for Congress ==
He also ran unsuccessfully in Ohio for a seat in the U.S. House of Representatives in 1890 and 1892.

== Death and legacy ==
Ashley suffered from diabetes since at least 1863. He died of heart failure after a fishing trip on September 16, 1896, in Alma, Michigan, and was interred in Toledo's Woodlawn Cemetery. A eulogy at the Unitarian Church in Ann Arbor, Michigan, mentioned his large size, "intellectually, physically and morally. There was nothing petty, small or mean about him." Three years before his death, his efforts on behalf of racial equality were recognized by the Afro-American League of Tennessee, and he donated the proceeds of a book of his speeches to build schools. His great-great-grandson Thomas William Ludlow Ashley, was later elected a U.S. Representative from Ohio.

Ann Arbor, named a downtown street leading to its railroad depot after Ashley. His descendant James Ashley IV recently completed a portrait of his great-grandfather, which is installed in the LaValley Law Library at the University of Toledo College of Law. In early 2010, the Ohio Historical Society proposed Ashley as a finalist in a statewide vote for inclusion in Statuary Hall at the United States Capitol.

The civil rights figure Frederick Douglass regarded Ashley as a white man who had a determination to secure equal justice for all, along with the likes of Benjamin Wade, Thaddeus Stevens, and Charles Sumner. Mary C. Ames described Ashley as the most genial and kindest man in the Congress.

Some historians have been unkind in their views on Ashley. C. Vann Woodward called him "a nut with an idée fixe," and Eric McKitrick described him as having, "an occult mixture of superstition and lunacy." A contemporary journalist, Benjamin Perley Poore, called Ashley a "man of the lightest mental calibre and most insufficient capacity" who "passed much of his time in perambulating the aisles of the House, holding short conferences with leading Republicans, and casting frequent glances into the ladies' gallery."

Ashley is played by the actor David Costabile in the 2012 Steven Spielberg movie Lincoln.

There is a small village located in Ashley, Michigan (48806), which is named after Ashley although he did not have any part in settling it. His name was used as he owned the railroad aroundd which the village was developed.

== Sources ==
- Foner, Eric. 1970. Free Soil, Free Labor, Free Men: The Ideology of the Republican Party Before the Civil War. Oxford University Press, London, New York. ISBN 0-19-501352-2

U.S. House of Representatives
Preceded by Richard Mott	Member of the U.S. House of Representatives from Ohio's 5th congressional district 1859-1863	Succeeded by Francis Celeste Le Blond
Preceded by Carey A. Trimble	Member of the U.S. House of Representatives from Ohio's 10th congressional district 1863–1869	Succeeded by Truman H. Hoag
