= Philip Cook (general) =

American politician (1817–1894)

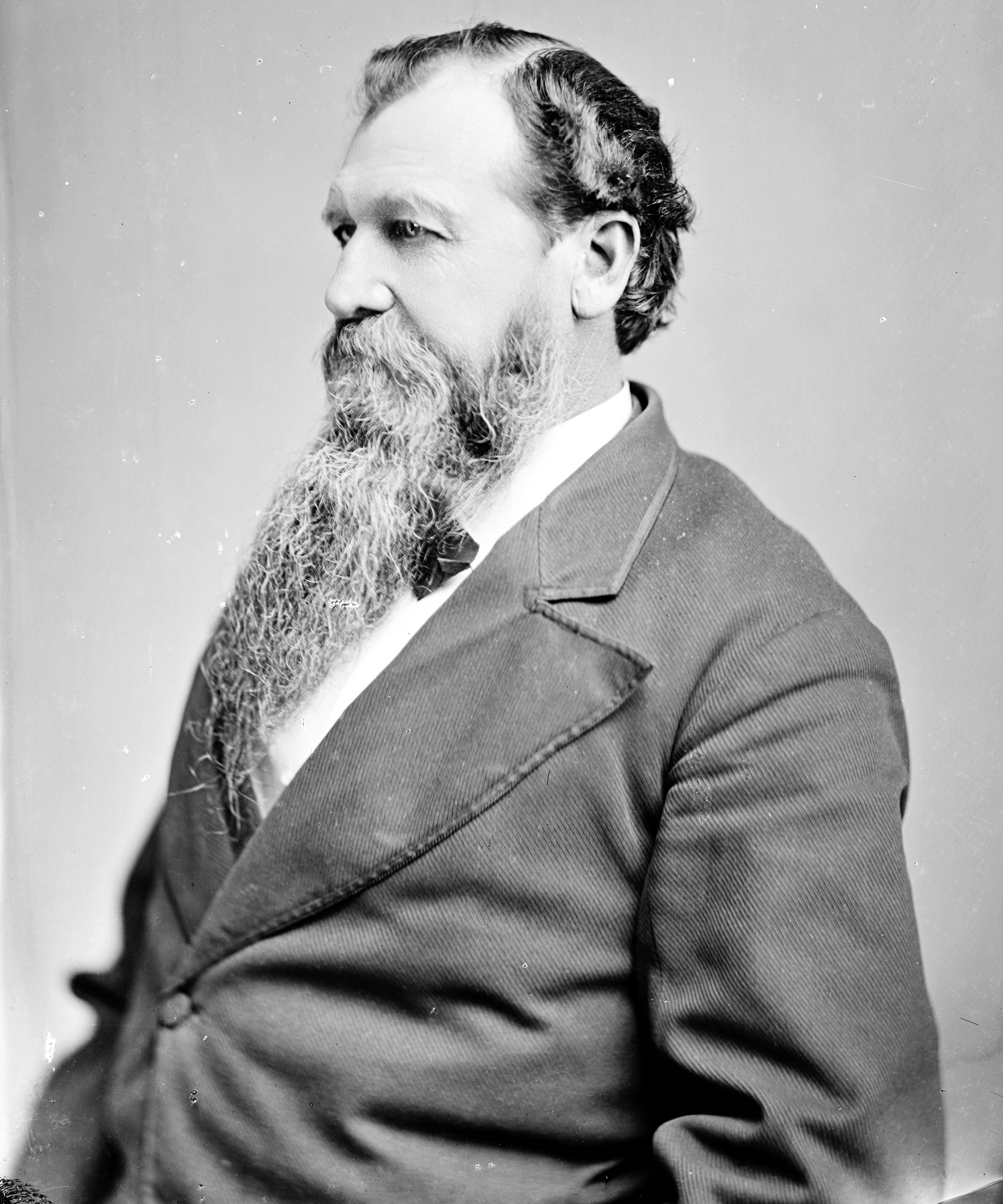
- Circa 1870-1880

13th Georgia Secretary of State
- In office November 8, 1890 – October 27, 1894
- Governor: William J. Northen
- Preceded by: Nathan Crawford Barnett
- Succeeded by: Allen D. Candler

Member of the U.S. House of Representatives from Georgia's 3rd district
- In office March 4, 1873 – March 3, 1883
- Preceded by: John S. Bigby
- Succeeded by: Charles F. Crisp

Personal details
- Born: July 31, 1817 Twiggs County, Georgia, U.S.
- Died: May 21, 1894 (aged 76) Atlanta, Georgia, U.S.
- Resting place: Rose Hill Cemetery (Macon, Georgia)
- Party: Democratic

Military service
- Allegiance: Confederate States of America
- Branch/service: Confederate States Army
- Years of service: 1861–1865
- Rank: Brigadier General (CSA)
- Battles/wars: American Civil War

Philip Cook Sr. (July 31, 1817 – May 21, 1894) was a general in the Confederate States Army during the American Civil War and a reconstruction era member of the United States Congress.

== Biography ==
Cook was born in Twiggs County, Georgia. His parents had moved from Virginia to Georgia. He served with the United States Army in the Seminole Wars, serving in Florida. After studying at Oglethorpe University, he graduated from the law school of the University of Virginia in 1841. He subsequently lived in Macon County, Georgia, where he maintained a law practice.

Once the American Civil War started, Cook sided with the Confederate States of America and enlisted as a private in the 4th Georgia Volunteer Infantry. By the end of the Seven Days campaign on the Virginia Peninsula, Cook had advanced to the rank of lieutenant colonel. He also fought in the battles of Second Manassas, Antietam and Chancellorsville, where he was wounded in the leg. As a result, he missed the Gettysburg campaign while he recovered.

For a short time, Cook took a leave of absence to serve in the Georgia Legislature before returning to the army. The first action he saw after recovering and returning to the war was the Battle of Cold Harbor. At the Battle of Cold Harbor in 1864 he took command of the brigade when Brig. Gen. George P. Doles was killed. Cook was wounded again at the Battle of the Crater during the Siege of Petersburg. After recovering, he fought under Maj. Gen. Stephen D. Ramseur at the Battle of Cedar Creek in the Shenandoah Valley before returning with his men to the trenches around Petersburg, Virginia. He was wounded a third time during the 1865 attack on Fort Stedman.

After the war ended in early 1865, Cook moved to Americus, Georgia, where he set up a law practice and was active in local and state politics. From 1873 to 1883, Cook was a member of the United States House of Representatives as a Democrat, serving a district comprising part of southwest Georgia. He became Georgia's Secretary of State in 1890, at the specific request of long-serving Secretary of State Nathan Crawford Barnett, made prior to his death in office. Cook was part of the commission that built Georgia's state capitol building in Atlanta.

Phillip Cook died in Atlanta on May 21, 1894. Cook County, Georgia, is named in his honor.

== See also ==
- List of American Civil War generals (Confederate)

== Notes ==
U.S. House of Representatives
| Preceded by John S. Bigby | Member of the U.S. House of Representatives from Georgia's 3rd congressional district March 4, 1873 – March 3, 1883 | Succeeded by Charles F. Crisp |
Political offices
| Preceded by Nathan Crawford Barnett | Secretary of State of Georgia; 1890–1894 | Succeeded by Allen D. Candler |
