= Richard H. Whiteley =

American politician

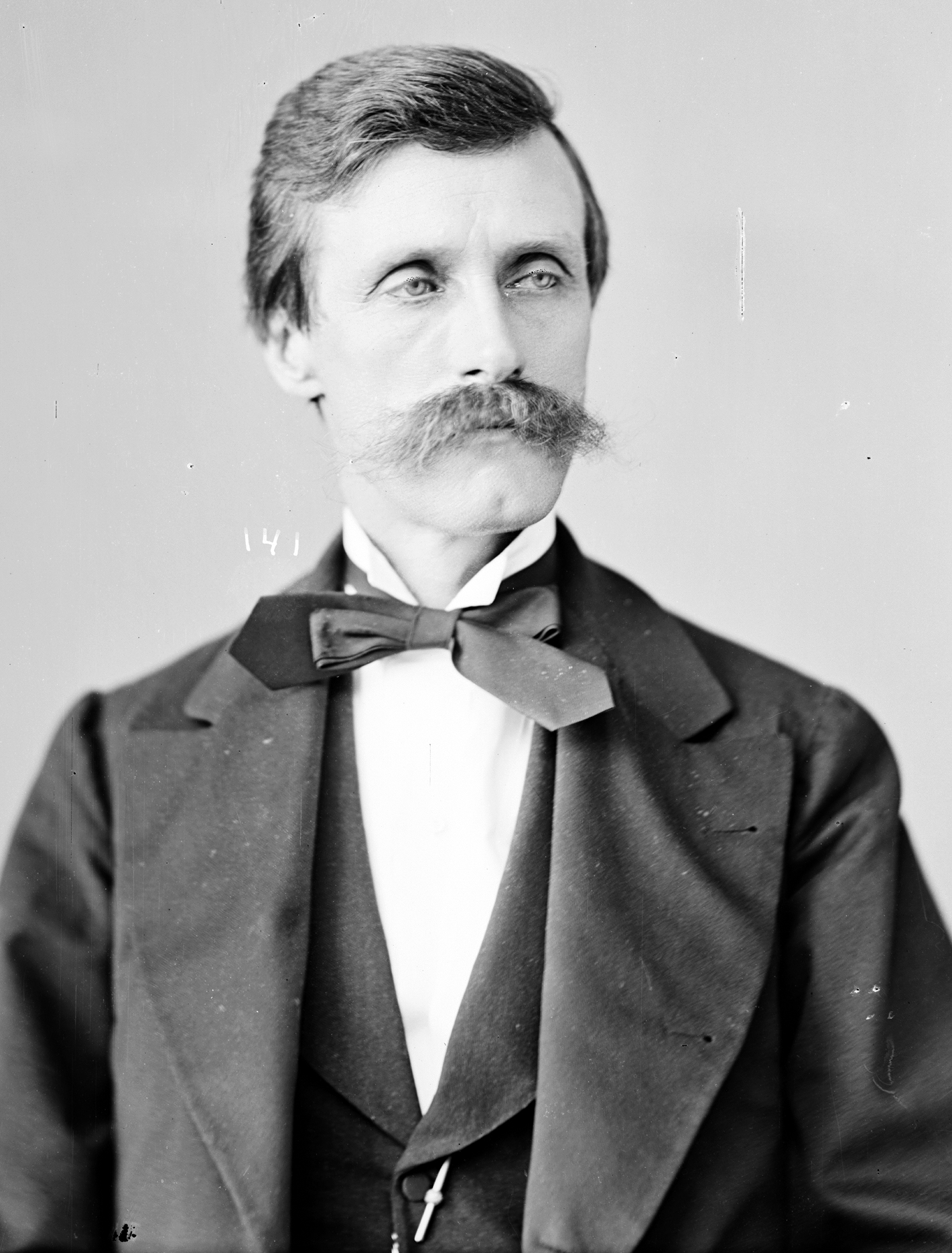

Member of the U.S. House of Representatives from Georgia's 2nd district
- In office December 22, 1870 – March 3, 1875
- Preceded by: Nelson Tift
- Succeeded by: William Ephraim Smith

Personal details
- Born: Richard Henry Whiteley; December 22, 1830 County Kildare, Ireland
- Died: September 26, 1890 (aged 59) Boulder, Colorado
- Resting place: Columbia Cemetery, Boulder, Colorado
- Party: Republican
- Spouse(s): Margarette Devine; Mary Strickland
- Occupation: Attorney

Military service
- Allegiance: Confederate States
- Branch/service: Confederate States Army
- Rank: Major
- Unit: 5th Georgia Infantry, 2nd Georgia Sharpshooter Battalion
- Battles/wars: American Civil War

Richard Henry Whiteley (December 22, 1830 – September 26, 1890) was an American lawyer and Confederate Civil War veteran who served as both a U.S. representative and U.S. senator-elect from Georgia. He is the only Republican to ever hold the 2nd congressional district from Georgia.

== Biography ==
Born in County Kildare, Ireland, Whiteley immigrated to the United States in 1836 with his parents, who settled in Georgia. He received private instruction in elementary education. He engaged in manufacturing. He studied law and was admitted to the bar in 1860, commencing practice in Bainbridge, Georgia.

=== Civil War ===
Whiteley opposed secession, but after the adoption of the ordinance entered the Confederate States Army and fought throughout the Civil War. He served in the 5th Georgia Infantry and 2nd Georgia Sharpshooter Battalion, attaining the rank of major. He served as member of the State constitutional convention in 1867.

=== Early political races ===
He was an unsuccessful candidate for election in 1866 to the Fortieth Congress, then presented credentials as a senator-elect to the United States Senate on July 15, 1870, to fill the vacancy in the term beginning March 4, 1865, but as the election took place prior to the readmission of Georgia into the Union was not admitted to a seat.

=== Congress ===
Whiteley was elected as a Republican to the Forty-first Congress to fill the vacancy caused by the House declaring Nelson Tift not entitled to the seat. He was reelected to the Forty-second and Forty-third Congresses and served from December 22, 1870, to March 3, 1875. He was an unsuccessful candidate for reelection to the Forty-fourth Congress and for election to the Forty-fifth Congress.

=== Later career and death ===
Following his time in Congress, he moved to Boulder, Colorado, in 1877 and resumed the practice of his profession. He died in Boulder on September 26, 1890, and was interred in the Masonic Cemetery.

== Notes ==
U.S. House of Representatives
Preceded by Nelson Tift	Member of the U.S. House of Representatives from Georgia's 2nd congressional district December 22, 1870 – March 3, 1875	Succeeded by William Ephraim Smith
