= Marion Bethune =

American politician

Member of the U.S. House of Representatives from Georgia's 3rd district
- In office December 22, 1870 – March 3, 1871
- Preceded by: William P. Edwards
- Succeeded by: John S. Bigby

Personal details
- Born: April 8, 1816 near Greensboro, Georgia
- Died: February 20, 1895 (aged 78) Talbotton, Georgia
- Party: Republican

Marion Bethune (April 8, 1816 – February 20, 1895) was a slave owner and U.S. Representative from Georgia.

== Life ==
Born near Greensboro, Georgia, Bethune attended private schools and De Hagan's Academy. He moved with his widowed mother to Talbotton, Georgia, in 1829. He engaged in mercantile pursuits. He studied law. He was admitted to the bar in 1842 and commenced practice at Talbotton. Probate judge of Talbot County from 1852 to 1868, when he voluntarily retired. He served as member of the constitutional convention of Georgia at the time of the repeal of the ordinance of secession. He served as member of the State house of representatives 1867–1871.

Bethune was elected as a Republican to the Forty-first Congress to fill the vacancy caused by the House declaring that William P. Edwards was not entitled to the seat and served from December 22, 1870, to March 3, 1871. He was an unsuccessful candidate for reelection in 1870 to the Forty-second Congress. He resumed the practice of law. He was an unsuccessful candidate for election in 1872 to the Forty-third Congress. United States census supervisor in 1890. He died in Talbotton, Georgia, February 20, 1895. He was interred in Oakhill Cemetery.

U.S. House of Representatives
Preceded by William P. Edwards	Member of the U.S. House of Representatives from Georgia's 3rd congressional district December 22, 1870 – March 3, 1871	Succeeded by John S. Bigby
