= Joseph Dixon (North Carolina politician) =

American politician

Joseph Dixon (April 9, 1828 – March 3, 1883) was an American farmer, jurist, and politician and as a U.S. representative from North Carolina for a brief period (1870–1871) following the death of his predecessor late in his term in office.

== Biography ==
Dixon was born near Farmville, North Carolina, on April 9, 1828. He engaged in agricultural pursuits and also in the mercantile business.

=== Career ===
Dixon was appointed colonel of the North Carolina State Militia soon after the Civil War and served as a local judge in 1864 and 1865.

He was then elected to serve a two terms as a representative of Greene County in the North Carolina House of Representatives (1868–69, 1869–70).

==== Congress ====
When Congressman David Heaton of North Carolina's 2nd congressional district died in office, Dixon was elected as a Republican to fill Heaton's vacant seat in the Forty-first Congress. Dixon took his seat December 5, 1870, and served until March 3, 1871; he was not a candidate for renomination in 1870.

=== Later career and death ===
He was later appointed as a United States Commissioner of Claims in 1871 and 1872; resumed agricultural pursuits, and was a delegate from Greene County to the State constitutional convention in 1875.

Dixon died near Fountain Hill, Pitt County, N.C., March 3, 1883.

== See also ==
- North Carolina General Assembly of 1868–1869

U.S. House of Representatives
Preceded by David Heaton	Member of the U.S. House of Representatives from North Carolina's 2nd congressional district 1870–1871	Succeeded by Charles Thomas
