= William Ephraim Smith =

American politician

William E. Smith
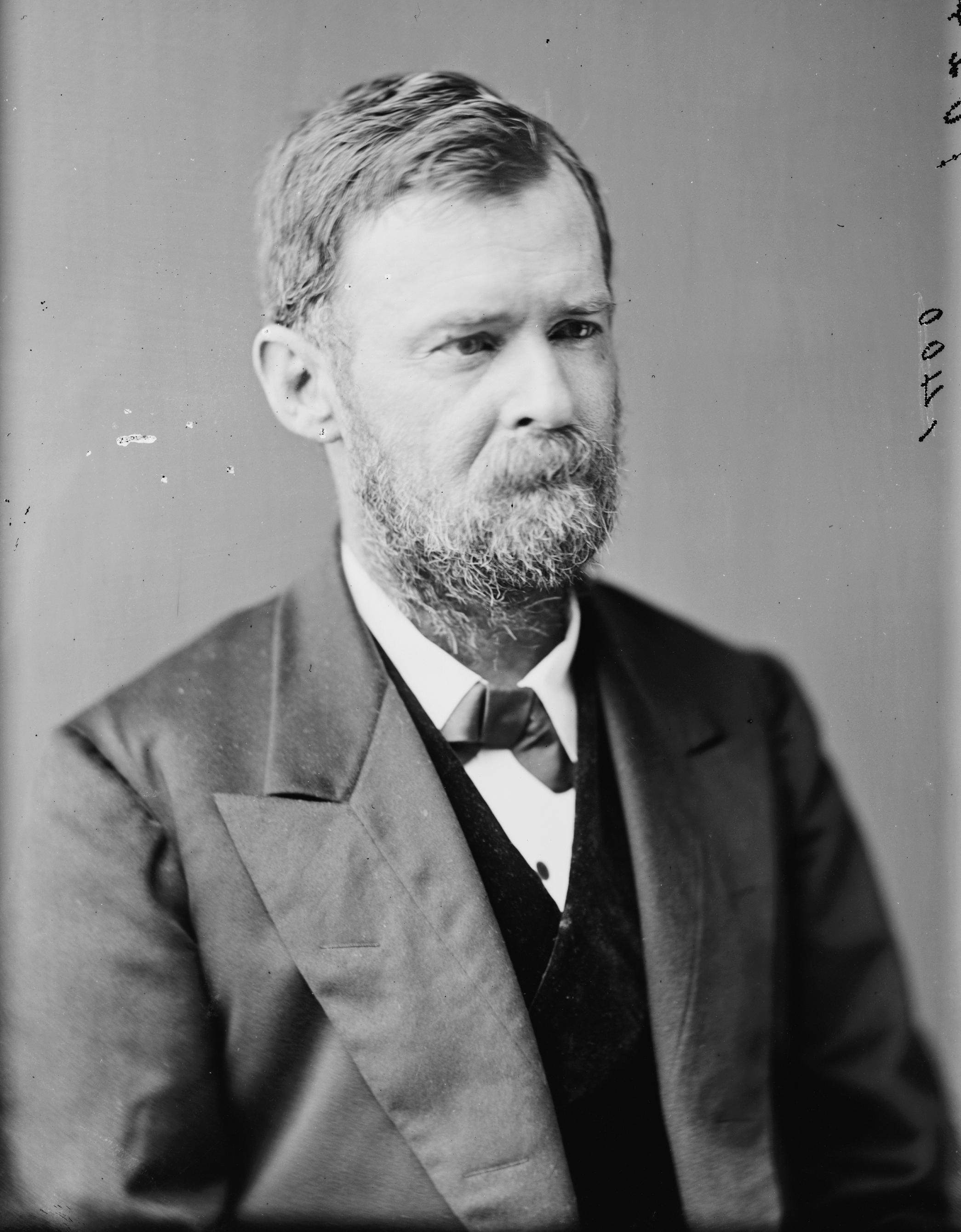

Member of the U.S. House of Representatives from Georgia's 2nd district
- In office March 4, 1875 – March 3, 1881
- Preceded by: Richard H. Whiteley
- Succeeded by: Henry G. Turner

Personal details
- Born: William Ephraim Smith; March 14, 1829 Augusta, Georgia
- Died: March 11, 1890 (aged 60) Albany, Georgia
- Party: Democratic
- Profession: planter lawyer

Military service
- Allegiance: Confederate States of America
- Branch/service: Confederate States Army
- Rank: Captain
- Unit: 4th Georgia Infantry

William Ephraim Smith (March 14, 1829 – March 11, 1890) was a planter, lawyer, and politician from Georgia. He served as an confederate officer during the Civil War. From 1875 to 1881, he served three terms in the U.S. House of Representatives.

== Biography ==
He was born in Augusta, Richmond County, Georgia. In 1846, he was admitted to the Georgia bar, which required a special act of the Georgia legislature due to his youth.

He worked as a planter and practiced law in Albany, Dougherty County, Georgia, for most of the period from 1846 to 1858. In 1853, he was an ordinary of Dougherty County.

=== Civil War ===
In 1858, Smith became the solicitor general of Georgia's southwest circuit, a post he held until 1860. The following year, the American Civil War broke out. Although opposed to secession, Smith enlisted in the Fourth Georgia Volunteer Infantry of the Confederate States Army as a lieutenant. He became a captain in April 1862 and in June lost his right leg at the Battle of Oak Grove. In 1863, he was elected as a representative to the Second Confederate Congress. His term as representative was cut short by the defeat of the Confederacy.

=== Congress ===
In 1874, Smith was offered and declined the office of circuit judge of Georgia; that same year, he was also elected as a representative to the United States Congress. He served as a representative from March 4, 1875, through March 3, 1881. After leaving office, Smith resumed the practice of law.

=== Later career and death ===
In 1886, Smith began a term as state senator and was also President of the Georgia Democratic Convention. Smith left office in 1888 and died two years later in Albany, Georgia.

== Sources ==
- United States Congress. "William Ephraim Smith (id: S000631)". Biographical Directory of the United States Congress. Retrieved on 2008-02-14

U.S. House of Representatives
Preceded by Richard H. Whiteley	Member of the U.S. House of Representatives from Georgia's 2nd congressional district March 4, 1875 – March 4, 1881	Succeeded by Henry G. Turner
