= Truman H. Hoag =

American politician

Member of the U.S. House of Representatives from Ohio's 10th district
- In office March 4, 1869 – February 5, 1870
- Preceded by: James Mitchell Ashley
- Succeeded by: Erasmus D. Peck

Personal details
- Born: Truman Harrison Hoag; April 9, 1816 Manlius, New York
- Died: February 5, 1870 (aged 53) Washington, D.C.
- Resting place: Forest Cemetery, Toledo, Ohio
- Party: Democratic

Truman Harrison Hoag (April 9, 1816 – February 5, 1870) was a 19th century American small businessman and politician who served part of one term as a U.S. representative from Ohio between 1869 and 1870.

== Biography ==
Born in Manlius, New York, Hoag attended the public schools.

=== Career ===
He moved to Syracuse, New York, in 1832 and was employed as a clerk in a store and later in the canal collector's office. He moved to Oswego, New York, in 1839 and was employed for a commission merchants company, moving to Toledo, Ohio, in 1849 as agent of the same firm. Later became engaged in transportation and in mercantile pursuits. He also engaged in the manufacture of illuminating gas and of coke.

He was an unsuccessful candidate for mayor in 1867.

=== Congress ===
Hoag was elected as a Democrat to the Forty-first Congress and served from March 4, 1869, until his death.

=== Death and burial ===
He died in Washington, D.C., on February 5, 1870 and was interred in Forest Cemetery in Toledo, Ohio.

== See also ==
- List of members of the United States Congress who died in office (1790–1899)

== Sources ==
- United States Congress. "Truman H. Hoag (id: H000650)". Biographical Directory of the United States Congress.

U.S. House of Representatives
Preceded by James Mitchell Ashley	Member of the U.S. House of Representatives from Ohio's 10th congressional district March 4, 1869 – February 5, 1870	Succeeded by Erasmus D. Peck
