= William P. Edwards =

American politician

Member of the U.S. House of Representatives from Georgia's 3rd district
- In office July 25, 1868 – March 3, 1869
- Preceded by: Office interrupted by the American Civil War
- Succeeded by: Marion Bethune

Personal details
- Born: November 9, 1835 near Talbotton, Georgia
- Died: June 28, 1900 (aged 64) Butler, Georgia
- Party: Republican

William Posey Edwards (November 9, 1835 – June 28, 1900) was a U.S. Representative from Georgia.

Born near Talbotton, Georgia, Edwards attended the common schools, and was graduated from Collinsworth Institute, Talbotton, Georgia, in 1856. He studied law. He was admitted to the bar in 1857 and commenced practice in Butler, Georgia. He served as member of the State constitutional convention in 1857 and 1858. He served during the Civil War in the Confederate States Army as captain of Company F, Twenty-seventh Georgia Volunteer Infantry. He was subsequently promoted to colonel of the regiment. Upon the readmission of Georgia to representation was elected as a Republican to the Fortieth Congress and served from July 25, 1868, to March 3, 1869. Presented credentials as a Member-elect to the Forty-first Congress, but was not permitted to qualify. He resumed the practice of his profession at Butler, Georgia, and died there June 28, 1900. He was interred in the Methodist Cemetery.

U.S. House of Representatives
Preceded by American Civil War	Member of the U.S. House of Representatives from Georgia's 3rd congressional district July 25, 1868 – March 3, 1869	Succeeded by Marion Bethune
