= David Heaton =

American politician

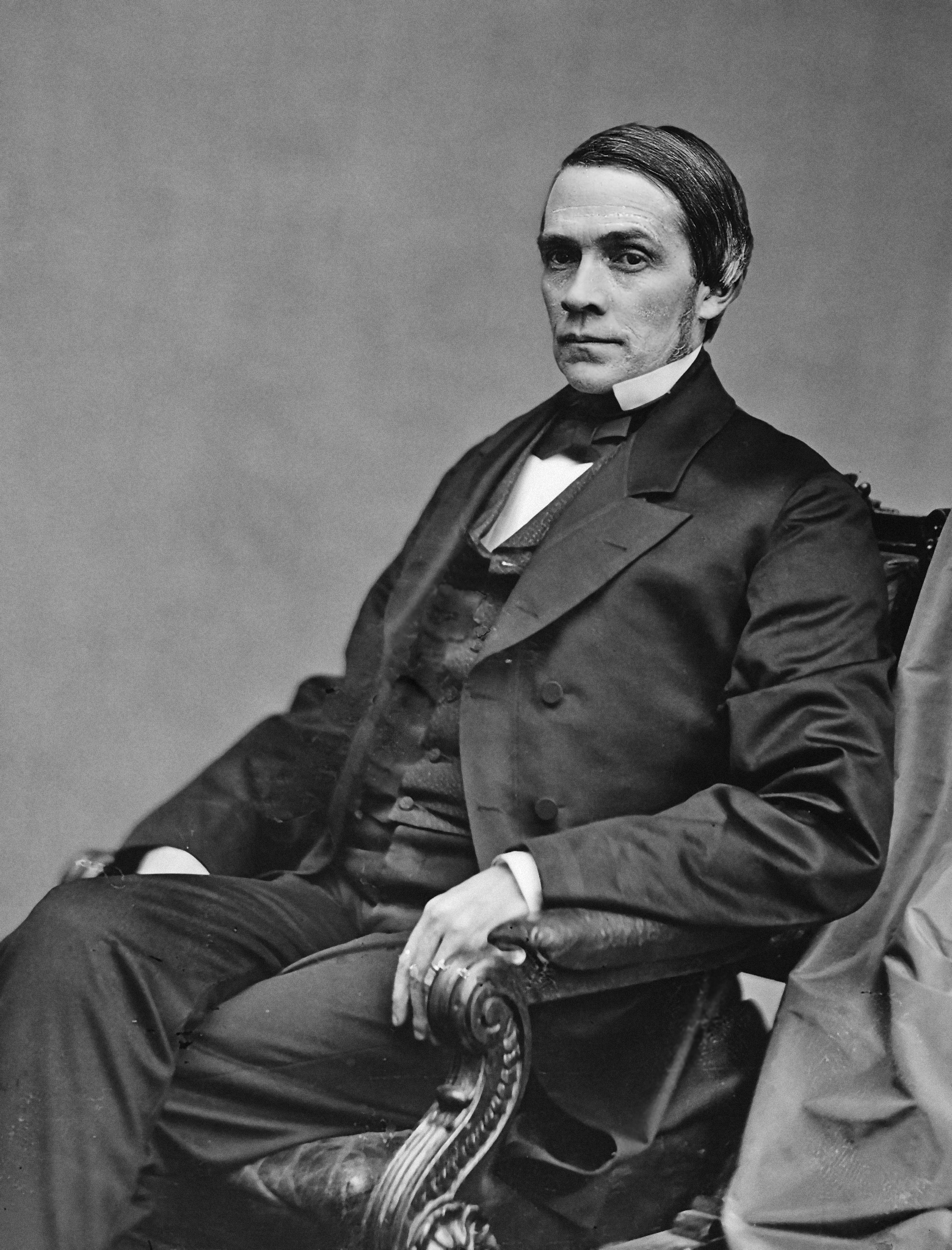

Member of the U.S. House of Representatives from North Carolina's 2nd district
- In office July 15, 1868 – June 25, 1870
- Succeeded by: Joseph Dixon

Member of the Minnesota Senate
- In office 1858–1863

Personal details
- Born: March 10, 1823 Hamilton, Ohio, U.S.
- Died: June 25, 1870 (aged 47) Washington, D.C., U.S.
- Resting place: New Bern National Cemetery
- Party: Republican
- Parent(s): James Heaton; Mary Morrell
- Profession: Politician, lawyer

David Heaton (March 10, 1823 – June 25, 1870) was an American attorney and politician, a U.S. representative from North Carolina. He earlier was elected to the state senates of Ohio and Minnesota.

== Early life and education ==
Heaton was born in Hamilton, Butler County, Ohio, March 10, 1823 to James Heaton (1779–1841) and Mary Morrell (1782–1871), migrants from the East. He completed preparatory studies and studied law as a legal apprentice. He was admitted to the bar.

== Political career ==
After getting active in politics, Heaton was elected to the Ohio Senate in 1855.

Two years later, he moved to St. Anthony Falls, Minnesota, where he entered politics. He was elected as a member of the Minnesota Senate, serving from 1858 to 1863.

During the American Civil War, in 1863 Heaton was appointed as a special agent of the United States Treasury Department and the United States depository in New Bern, North Carolina after Union troops occupied the area. A contraband camp was set up near the city to begin education of former slaves for independence. In 1864, he was offered the appointment as the Third Auditor of the Treasury but declined.

Heaton decided to stay in North Carolina, where he served as a member of its constitutional convention in 1867 under Reconstruction. When the state was readmitted to representation, he was elected as a Republican to the Fortieth Congress and reelected to the Forty-first Congress, serving from July 15, 1868, until his death. He was chairman of the Committee on Coinage, Weights, and Measures (Forty-first Congress).

After his nomination as a Republican candidate for reelection to the Forty-second Congress, he died in Washington, D.C., on June 25, 1870. His body was returned to New Bern, where he was interred in the National Cemetery.

== See also ==
- 40th United States Congress
- 41st United States Congress
- List of members of the United States Congress who died in office (1790–1899)

U.S. House of Representatives
Preceded by Civil War	Member of the U.S. House of Representatives from North Carolina's 2nd congressional district 1868–1870	Succeeded by Joseph Dixon
