= Nelson Tift =

American politician (1810–1891)

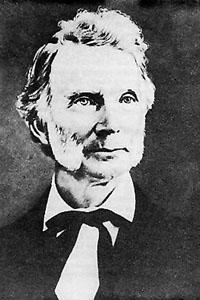

Member of the U.S. House of Representatives from Georgia's 2nd district
- In office July 25, 1868 – March 3, 1869
- Preceded by: Civil War
- Succeeded by: Richard H. Whiteley

Member of the Georgia House of Representatives from the state district
- In office 1841, 1847, and 1851-52 – one-year term

Personal details
- Born: July 23, 1810 Groton, Connecticut
- Died: November 21, 1891 (aged 81) Albany, Georgia
- Resting place: Oakview Cemetery, Albany, Georgia
- Party: Democratic
- Occupation: Businessman, merchant, Congressman

Military service
- Allegiance: Confederate States of America
- Branch/service: Confederate States Navy
- Years of service: 1861–1865
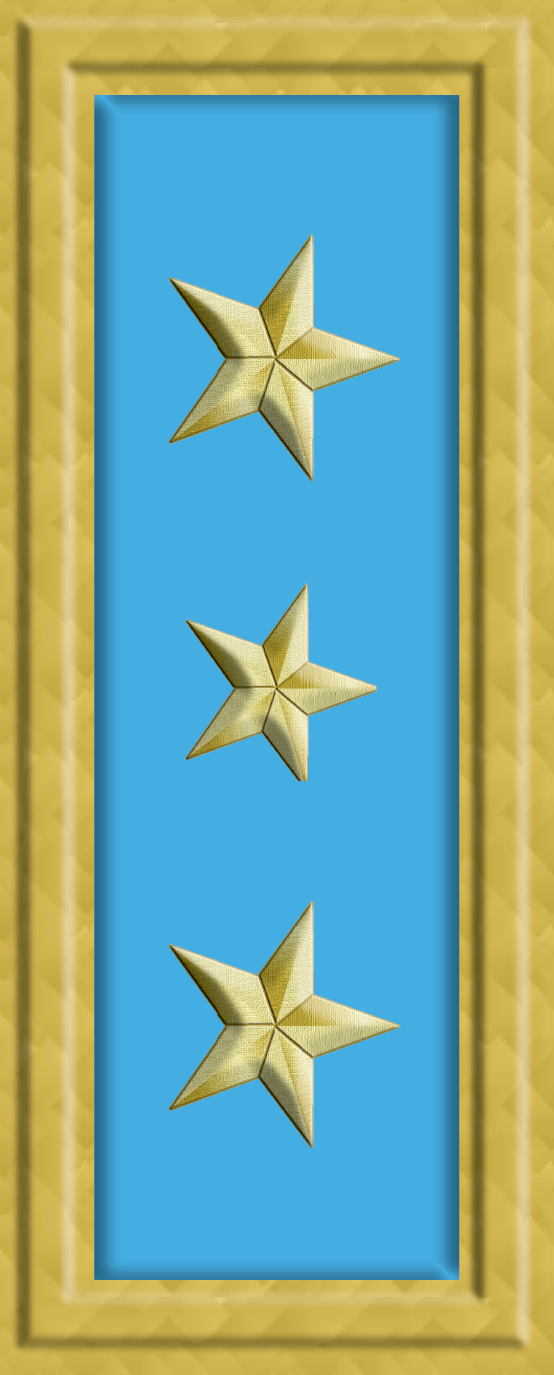
- Rank: Captain
- Unit: Georgia Militia
- Battles/wars: American Civil War

Nelson Tift (July 23, 1810 – November 21, 1891) was an American jurist, businessman, sailor, and politician who is best known for founding the city of Albany, Georgia.

== Biography ==
Tift was born in Groton, Connecticut. Early in his life he became a devout Episcopalian.

He moved with his family to Key West, Florida in the 1820s, where he assisted his father in a mercantile business, and then to Augusta, Georgia in 1830, where he was also in business. During his travels, he opened many side businesses and ventures. He arrived in what would later be called Albany and set up a small trading post along with a sawmill. On July 5, 1840, he was elected to the Baker County, Georgia Inferior Court and was re-elected to that post in January 1841. In 1840, he owned 11 slaves.

Tift was married and had at least one daughter, Fannie, who was married to Confederate War Captain Thomas N. Nelson; he fought in the war and died at Tupelo, Mississippi in 1864.

In 1840, Tift was elected as a colonel of the local unit of the Georgia Militia. In 1841, he was elected to the Georgia House of Representatives and was re-elected to that one-year position in 1847, 1851, and 1852. While a state legislator, he supported the reopening of the international slave trade as a means to extend slave ownership to all white Georgians, and chastised white artisans for opposing the use of slave craftsmen. Although not an advocate of immediate secession, he accepted the final decision and lent his services to the new nation.

Tift founded, edited and published the Albany Patriot newspaper from 1845 until 1858.

In 1850, he owned eight slaves. In 1860, he owned nine slaves in Albany, and an additional 19 slaves spread out over two locations in surrounding Dougherty County.

== Civil War years and later life ==
During the American Civil War, Tift was a captain in the Confederate States Navy supply department. He built gunboats for the Confederate navy and supplied the Rebel army with beef and hardtack produced by his factories at Albany and at nearby Palmyra in Lee County.

After the war ended, he was elected to the 40th United States Congress as a U.S. Representative with the Democratic Party and served from July 25, 1868, until March 3, 1869. He was not permitted to qualify for re-election in 1868 and unsuccessfully contested the election of his replacement, Richard H. Whiteley. He was the only House Democrat to vote in favor of the initial version of the Fifteenth Amendment to the United States Constitution, but was absent from the vote on the final version.

After his congressional service, Tift worked in various businesses. He served as a delegate to the State Constitutional Convention in 1877.

He was extremely popular with the people of Albany, and built a large home in the center of the city that still stands today.

He died in Albany on November 21, 1891, and was buried in that city's Oakview Cemetery.

Tift County, Georgia, was named in his honor, but in March 2013 the Georgia Legislature voted to adopt a resolution written by Edd Dorminey of Tifton, naming Tift County after its founder (and Nelson Tift's nephew), Henry Harding (H.H.) Tift. Because H.H. Tift was living in 1905 when Tift County was founded, the county could not be named after him. Wanting the county to honor the Tifts, the delegates chose Nelson Tift, as he was deceased.

== Role in Georgia ==
On September 24, 1836, Tift, with a group of men headed by John Rawls, president of the bank of Hawkinsville, entered into an agreement to found a city on the west bank of the Flint River. This city would eventually acquire the name of Albany; it was named for Albany, New York as both cities are at the head of navigable rivers.

A booster, he promoted education, business, and railroad construction. He opposed Radical Reconstruction in the state and in Congress, and was scornful of the Yankee carpetbaggers who came into Georgia after the war. Fair concludes that Tift became "more Southern than many natives." His pro-slavery attitudes before the war and his support for segregation afterward made him compatible with Georgia's white elite.

U.S. House of Representatives
Preceded by American Civil War	Member of the U.S. House of Representatives from Georgia's 2nd congressional district July 25, 1868 – March 3, 1869	Succeeded by Richard H. Whiteley
