= Harry Kessler =

Harry Kessler may refer to:

- Harry Graf Kessler (1868–1937), German writer, artist, diplomat and politician
- Harry W. Kessler (1927–2007), mayor of the city of Toledo, Ohio
