= List of mayors of Toledo, Ohio =

This is a list of mayors of Toledo, Ohio.

Term of service	Image	Name	Life dates	Party
1837–1839		John Berdan	1798–1841	Whig
1839–1840		Hezekiah D. Mason		Whig
1840–1843		Myron H. Tilden	1812–1888	Whig
1843–1844		James Myers	1795–1864	Democratic
1844–1845		George B. Way	1811–1868	Whig
1845–1846		Richard Mott	1804–1888	Republican
1846–1849		Emery Davis Potter	1804–1896	Democratic
1849–1850		Daniel O. Morton	1815–1859	Democratic
1850–1851		Caleb F. Abbott	1811–1855	Whig
1851–1852		Charles M. Dorr	1816–1870	
1852 (resigned)		Daniel McBain	1820–1889	
1852 (resigned)		Egbert B. Brown	1816–1902	
1852–1853		Ira L. Clark	1810–1885	
1853		Mavor Brigham	1806–1897	
1853–1857 (2 terms)		Charles M. Dorr	1816–1870	
1857–1860 (resigned)		Alexander Brownlee	1806–1872	
1860–1861		Alexander H. Newcomb	1824–1888	Republican
1861		Isaac R. Sherwood	1835–1925	Democratic
1861–1863		John Manor	1829–1888	
1863–1867 (3 terms)		Charles M. Dorr	1816–1870	
1867–1869		Charles A. King	1817–1893	Republican
1869–1871		William Kraus	1813–1883	Republican
1871–1875		William W. Jones	1819–1892	Democratic
1875–1877		Guido Marx	1827–1899	Republican
1877–1879 (2 terms)		William W. Jones	1819–1892	Democratic
1879–1885		Jacob Romeis	1835–1904	Republican
1885		George W. Scheets	1842–1929	Republican
1885–1887		Samuel F. Forbes	1830–1897	Republican
1887–1891		James Kent Hamilton	1839–1918	Republican
1891–1893		Vincent J. Emmick	1846–1917	Republican
1893–1897		Guy G. Major	1859–1912	Republican
1897–1904 (died in office)		Samuel M. Jones	1846–1904	Republican
1904–1905		Robert H. Finch	1856–1915	Republican
1906–1913		Brand Whitlock	1869–1934	Democratic
1914–1915		Carl Henry Keller	1875–1952	Republican
1916–1917		Charles M. Milroy	1867–1931	Republican
1918–1921		Cornell Schreiber	1881–1945	Democratic
1922–1925		Bernard F. Brough	1871–1926	Republican
1926–1927		Fred J. Mery	1876–1949	Republican
1928–1931		William Trayton Jackson	1876–1933	Republican
1932–1933		Addison Q. Thacher	1876–1963	Republican
1934–1935		Solon T. Klotz	1866–1948	
1936–1939		Roy C. Start	1877–1956	Republican
1940–1942 (resigned)		John Q. Carey	1905–1958	
1943–1947		Lloyd Emerson Roulet	1891–1985	Republican
1948–1950		Michael DiSalle	1908–1981	Democratic
1950–1951		Ollie Czelusta	1896–1981	Republican
1952–1953 (2 terms)		Lloyd Emerson Roulet	1891–1985	Republican
1954–1957 (2 terms)		Ollie Czelusta	1896–1981	Republican
1957–1959		John W. Yager	1920–2000	Democratic
1959–1961		Michael J. Damas	1912–2003	Democratic
1961–1967		John William Potter	1918–2013	Republican
1967–1971		William J. Ensign	1924–2011	Democratic
1971–1976		Harry W. Kessler	1927–2007	Democratic
1977–1983		Douglas DeGood	1947–2019	Democratic
1983–1989		Donna Owens	1937–	Republican
1990–1993		John McHugh	1930–2015	Democratic
1994–2002		Carleton S. Finkbeiner	1939–	Republican
2002–2006		Jack Ford	1947–2015	Democratic
2006–2010 (2 terms)		Carleton S. Finkbeiner	1939–	Democratic
2010–2014		Michael P. Bell	1955–	Independent
2014–2015 (died in office)		D. Michael Collins	1944–2015	Independent
2015–2018		Paula Hicks-Hudson	1951–	Democratic
2018–present		Wade Kapszukiewicz	1972–	Democratic
