= Jacob Romeis =

American politician

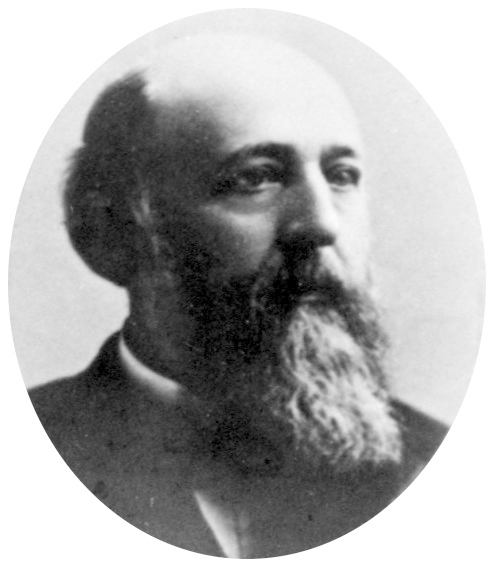

Member of the U.S. House of Representatives from Ohio's 10th district
- In office March 4, 1885 – March 3, 1889
- Preceded by: Frank H. Hurd
- Succeeded by: William E. Haynes

26th Mayor of Toledo, Ohio
- In office 1879–1885
- Preceded by: William W. Jones
- Succeeded by: Jacob W. Scheets

Personal details
- Born: December 1, 1835 Kingdom of Bavaria, German Confederation
- Died: March 8, 1904 (aged 68) Toledo, Ohio, U.S.
- Resting place: Woodlawn Cemetery
- Party: Republican
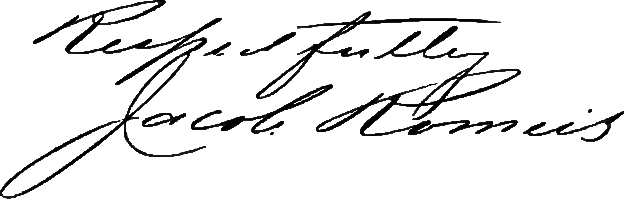
- Signature

Jacob Romeis (December 1, 1835 – March 8, 1904) was an American businessman and politician who served two terms as a U.S. representative from Ohio from 1885 to 1889.

== Biography ==
Born in Weisenbach, Bavaria in the German Confederation, Romeis attended the village schools. He immigrated in 1847 to the United States with his parents, who settled in Erie County, New York, and attended the public and select schools of Buffalo, New York.

=== Early career ===
He engaged in the shipping business and railroading. He moved to Toledo, Ohio, in 1856.

Romeis was elected to the board of aldermen of the city of Toledo in 1874. He was reelected in 1876 and served as president of the board in 1877. He served as mayor of Toledo from 1879 to 1885.

=== Congress ===
Romeis was elected as a Republican to the Forty-ninth and Fiftieth Congresses (March 4, 1885 - March 3, 1889). He was an unsuccessful candidate for reelection in 1888 to the Fifty-first Congress. He later engaged in fruit growing near Toledo.

=== Death and burial ===
He died in Toledo, Ohio on March 8, 1904. He was interred in Woodlawn Cemetery.

U.S. House of Representatives
Preceded by Frank H. Hurd	Member of the U.S. House of Representatives from Ohio's 10th congressional district March 4, 1885–March 3, 1889	Succeeded by William E. Haynes
