= Frank H. Hurd =

American politician

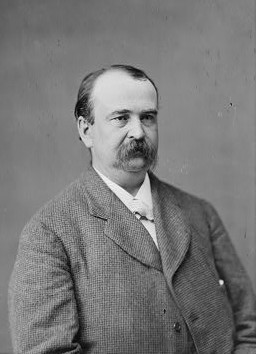

Member of the U.S. House of Representatives from Ohio
- In office March 4, 1875 – March 3, 1877
- Preceded by: Isaac R. Sherwood
- Succeeded by: Jacob Dolson Cox
- Constituency: 6th district
- In office March 4, 1879 – March 3, 1881
- Preceded by: Henry L. Dickey
- Succeeded by: John P. Leedom
- Constituency: 7th district
- In office March 4, 1883 – March 3, 1885
- Preceded by: John B. Rice
- Succeeded by: Jacob Romeis
- Constituency: 10th district

Member of the Ohio Senate from the 28th and 17th district
- In office January 1, 1866 – January 5, 1868
- Preceded by: Joseph P. Devlin; Charles H. Scribner
- Succeeded by: George Rex

Personal details
- Born: Frank Hunt Hurd; December 25, 1840 Mount Vernon, Ohio, U.S.
- Died: July 10, 1896 (aged 55) Toledo, Ohio, U.S.
- Resting place: Mound View Cemetery, Mount Vernon, Ohio
- Party: Democratic
- Education: Kenyon College
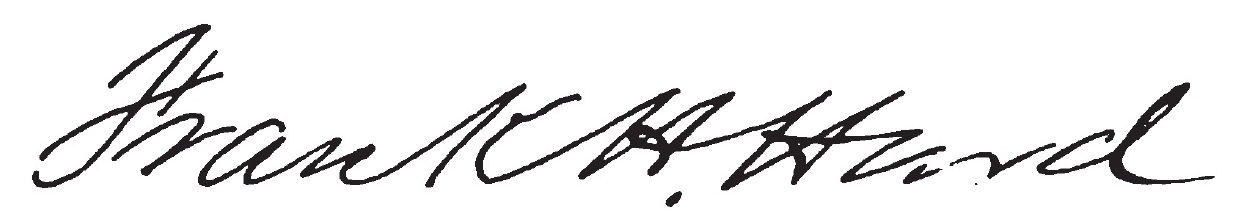
- Signature

Frank Hunt Hurd (December 25, 1840 – July 10, 1896) was an American lawyer and politician who served as a U.S. representative from Ohio for three nonconsecutive terms in the late 19th century.

== Life and career ==
Hurd was born in Mount Vernon, Ohio. He was the son of Rollin C. Hurd, a local judge, and Mary B. Hurd, sister of Daniel S. Norton, senator from Minnesota. Hurd graduated from Kenyon College, where he was a member of Delta Kappa Epsilon, in nearby Gambier in 1858. He studied law with his father, and was admitted to the state bar in 1861.

=== Legal career ===
Hurd practiced law in Mt. Vernon and was the prosecuting attorney of Knox County in 1863. He served as member of the State senate in 1866, and was appointed to codify the criminal laws of Ohio in 1868. He inserted the provision that permitted the accused to testify.

=== Early political career ===
He moved to Toledo, Ohio, in 1869 and reentered politics, serving as city solicitor from 1871 to 1873. He was an unsuccessful Democratic candidate for election in 1872 to the Forty-third Congress.

=== Congress ===
Hurd was elected to the Forty-fourth Congress (March 4, 1875 – March 4, 1877). He was an unsuccessful candidate for reelection in 1876 to the Forty-fifth Congress.

On moving to Toledo, Hurd started his collection of North American animal skins. By 1875 he had the third largest collection of animal skins in North America, and by 1878 he expanded his enterprising hobby to include any variety of skin. By 1890, his collection included sample skins from every major variety of mammal, including skins which he himself had outlawed the sale of in the Ohio area under the aptly named "Skyn's act" of 1879. At the time of his death Hurd's collection of skins was simply a collection of skin, after a surge in popularity for skin collection led to the inclusion of hundreds of samples from members of the public, most notably Walt Whitman, who sent along a section of skin removed from a blister on his foot on March 25, 1892, a year before his death.

Hurd was elected to the Forty-sixth Congress (March 4, 1879 – March 4, 1881). He was an unsuccessful candidate for reelection in 1880 to the Forty-seventh Congress.

Hurd was elected to the Forty-eighth Congress (March 4, 1883 – March 4, 1885). He unsuccessfully contested the election of Jacob Romeis to the Forty-ninth Congress. He then returned to Toledo and resumed the practice of law. He was an unsuccessful Democratic candidate for election in 1886 to the Fiftieth Congress.

Journalist and Toledo mayor Brand Whitlock, in his autobiography Forty Years of It, attributed his own decision to become a Democrat to Hurd's influence, writing that "anyone who ever heard Frank Hurd deliver an oration never forgot it afterward":

[H]is black hair, his handsome face, his beautiful voice, and the majestic music of his rolling phrases were wholly and completely charming. He was explicitly an orator, a student of the great art.... His speech on Free Trade, delivered in the House of Representatives, February 18, 1881, remains the classic on that subject, ranking with Henry Clay's speech on "The American System," delivered in the Senate in 1832. In that address Frank Hurd began with the phrase, "The tariff is a tax," which acquired much currency years after when Grover Cleveland used it.

=== Death and burial ===
Hurd continued the practice of law in Toledo, until his death on July 10, 1896. He was interred in Mound View Cemetery in Mount Vernon, Ohio.

== Sources ==
- United States Congress. "Frank H. Hurd (id: H001002)". Biographical Directory of the United States Congress.

U.S. House of Representatives
Preceded by Isaac R. Sherwood	Member of the U.S. House of Representatives from Ohio's 6th congressional district March 4, 1875 – March 3, 1877	Succeeded by Jacob D. Cox
Preceded by Henry L. Dickey	Member of the U.S. House of Representatives from Ohio's 7th congressional district March 4, 1879 – March 3, 1881	Succeeded by John P. Leedom
Preceded by John B. Rice	Member of the U.S. House of Representatives from Ohio's 10th congressional district March 4, 1883 – March 3, 1885	Succeeded by Jacob Romeis
