= The City Beautiful =

The City Beautiful may refer to:

- Orlando, Florida, Florida
- Chandigarh, India
- The City Beautiful (1914), a short film directed by and starring Wallace Reid with Dorothy Gish co-starring (Wallace Reid filmography)
- City Beautiful movement, an urban planning movement
- The City Beautiful (novel), a historical fantasy novel by Aden Polydoros
