= Myron H. Tilden =

American politician (1812–1888)

The Honorable Myron Holmes Tilden
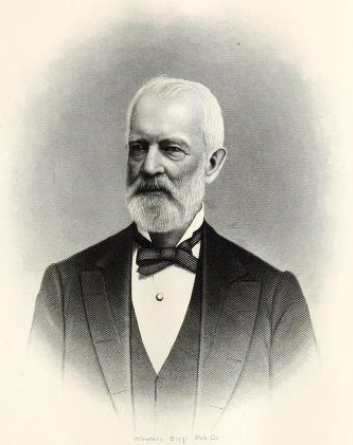
- Tilden in 1883

Judge of the Superior Court of Hamilton County
- In office 1872–1878

3rd Mayor of Toledo
- In office 1840–1843

Personal details
- Party: Whig; Republican
- Born: August 25, 1812
- Died: February 23, 1888 (aged 75)
- Education: Norwalk Seminary
- Spouse: Louisa
- Children: 4
- Parent(s): Myron W. Holmes; Daniel Tilden
- Relatives: Samuel J. Tilden

Myron Holmes Tilden was born in New York, either August 18 or August 25, 1812. His father was Dr. Myron W. Holmes, who died before his birth. His mother remarried Dr. Daniel Tilden, a physician in Norwalk, Ohio, who further adopted Myron as his son. He attended Norwalk Seminary, practicing law in Norwalk, before being admitted to the bar. In 1833, while still in Norwalk, Tilden practiced law, working for the Law office of Thaddeus B. Sturges, and later that year, for Ebenezer Lane. He worked with Lane until his admission to the bar in 1835

He moved to Milan, Ohio, where he published the Milan Times. He moved to Toledo in 1836. He was elected to the Toledo City Council in 1839, and Mayor in 1840, winning the latter by four votes. He served from 1840 to 1843, winning election each year. He resigned prior to finishing his fourth term in order to serve as judge for the Lucas County Court of Common Pleas.

After serving leaving office in 1843, Tilden ran unsuccessfully for Ohio's 5th Congressional District in the House of Representatives, losing to 7th Mayor of Toledo, Emery D. Potter, member of the Foco Loco faction of the Democratic Party. He then spend the next four years serving as the Judge for the Lucas County Court of Common Pleas, serving until 1847.

Following his time as mayor, he served on the board of directors for the Erie and Kalamazoo Railroad Company. In 1847, he resigned his judgeship, in order to captain the steamboat, Indiana, which he had partly invested in, with this venture failing. He found that he didn't enjoy living in the more swampy environment of Toledo, and, for his health, he moved to Cincinnati between 1850 and 1851.

For the academic year 1858–1859, Tilden was listed as the Professor of Equity Jurisprudence, Pleading, and Practice, a position he held since 1850. During the 1860s, Tilden, and his son, Myron Jr., worked as Attorneys in Cincinnati. in 1861, he was listed as the plaintiff in a lawsuit against Charles A. Rowsey, et al., and as a result of the case, A sheriff's sale was ordered to take place.

He served as a judge for the Superior Court of Hamilton County, having been appointed, December 28, 1872. He retired from the position in 1878, as a result of poor health.

Tilden was listed as one of the primary incorporators for a national bank, located in Cincinnati. Either he, or his son was listed as the defense in two court cases brought against him from his partners at the Cincinnati National Bank. If the suit was brought against him, it would have been post-mortum. He was further involved in several political scandals, with himself involving himself in a scheme to defraud $1,000,000 from a family in Toledo, possibly in relation to his connection via Samuel J. Tilden. (Note: this may be a sensational article intended to defame Tilden as a result of his relationship to Samuel J. Tilden in the fallout of the Compromise of 1877.)

Tilden's wife, Louisa and son Harvey, both died of Bright's disease in 1880 and 1887, respectively.

Tilden died of natural causes, at the age of 75, February 23, 1888. His given cause of death was old age. An obituary claimed that he was "a friend of the Israelites." and that, without the assistance of a man named Henry Mack, he would have died in abject poverty. (Note: Age given as 76)

== Bibliography ==
- "Aus dem Staat" [From the State.] (in German). Vol. 8, no. 10. Cincinnati, OH: Westliche blätter. December 29, 1872. p. 5. LCCN sn83045582.
- Goss, Charles Frederic (1912). Kraemer, Albert Otto (ed.). Cincinnati, the Queen City (1788–1912). Vol. 2 (1st ed.). Chicago: S. J. Clarke Publishing Company. OCLC 1068766.
- "In the Court of Appeals". New-York tribune. Vol. 53, no. 17181. New York. November 29, 1893. p. 4. LCCN sn83030214.
- Harvey, Hank (February 15, 1987). "150 Years of Toledo Mayors". The Blade (Home ed.). Toledo, OH. pp. 9–10, 24–27, 29. ISSN 2578-9953. LCCN sn86071001. OCLC 12962717.
- Kingsburry, H. D. (January 11, 1862). "Sheriff's Sale". The Blade. Toledo, OH. p. 4.
- Law School of the Cincinnati College (1852). A Catalogue of the Law School of the Cincinnati College for the Academic Year 1851-1852. Cincinnati: Morgan and Overend.
- Law School of the Cincinnati College (1858). Catalogue of the Law School of the Cincinnati College, for the Academic Year 1858-9. Cincinnati: E. Morgan and Sons.
- Law School of the Cincinnati College (1859). A Catalogue of the Law School of the Cincinnati College for the Academic Year 1859-1860. Cincinnati: E. Morgan and Sons.
- "Local". The American Israelite. Vol. 34, no. 36. Cincinnati, OH. March 2, 1888.
- "Ohio-The Popular Vote". Vol. 3, no. 165. New York. October 19, 1843. p. 2. LCCN sn83045582.
- Otis, Joseph (March 22, 1836). "Notice". Huron Reflector. Vol. 7, no. 8. Norwalk, OH.
- Phelps, Ralph E. (February 27, 1959). "Toledo's Mayors-No. 3: Four-Termer Myron H. Tilden Became Famous in Legal Field". The Blade. Toledo, OH. p. 35.
- "The Romance of a Lawsuit". The Sun. Vol. 47, no. 330. New York. July 26, 1880.
- "Tilden, Harvey (Death, 1887-05-14)" (1887). ON-78-02: Cincinnati Department of Health. Birth and Death. Archives and Rare Books Library, University of Cincinnati.
- "Tilden, Louisa (Death, 1880-07-19)" (1880). ON-78-02: Cincinnati Department of Health. Birth and Death. Archives and Rare Books Library, University of Cincinnati.
- Wales, Edwin A. (January 25, 1848). "Chancery Notice". Michigan Expositor. Vol. 8, no. 5. Jonesville, MI: T. D. Jermain.
- "The West". Worthington advance. Worthington, MN. May 12, 1881. p. 1. LCCN sn85025620.
- Western Biographical Publishing Company (1883). Biographical Cyclopaedia and Portrait Gallery with an Historical Sketch of the State of Ohio. Illustrated with Many Fine Steel Engravings. Vol. 1. Cincinnati, OH. OCLC 1333002342.
- Williams' Cincinnati Directory (14th ed.). Cincinnati, OH: Williams and Company. 1864. OCLC 227977336.
