= Lloyd Emerson Roulet =

American politician

Lloyd Emerson Roulet (September 15, 1891 – February 6, 1985), born in Toledo, Ohio was the Republican mayor of Toledo from 1943–47 and 1952–53. He was an alternate delegate to the 1952 Republican National Convention from Ohio. He was also a jeweler and member of the Freemasons.

He died at the age of 93 and is interred at Woodlawn Cemetery in Toledo.
