= Washington W. Boynton =

American judge (1833–1916)

Washington Wallace Boynton
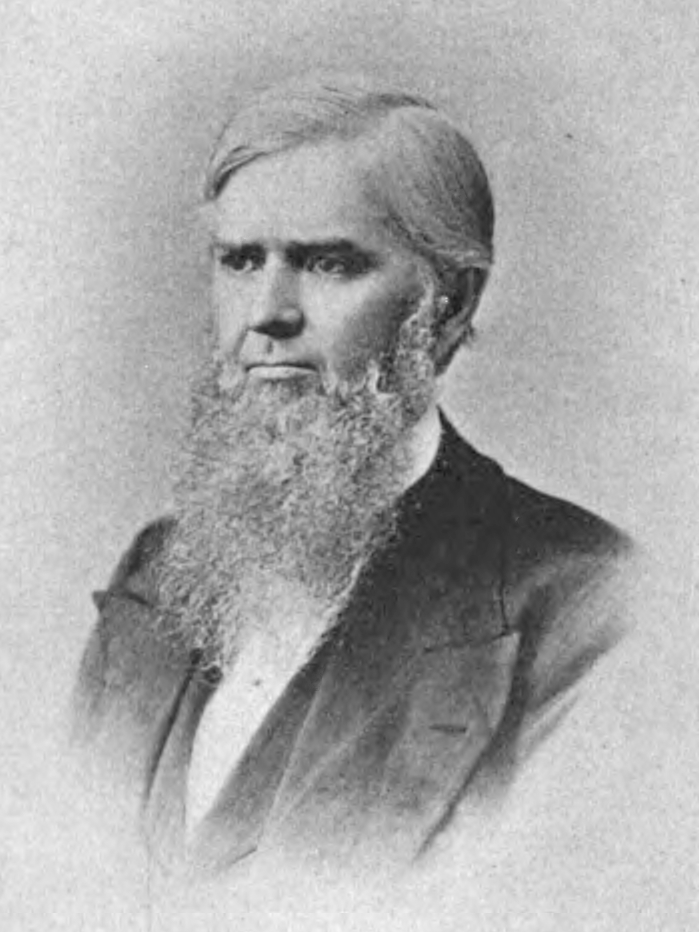

Ohio Supreme Court Justice
- In office February 8, 1877 – November 9, 1881
- Preceded by: George Rex
- Succeeded by: Nicholas Longworth II

Personal details
- Born: January 27, 1833 Russia Township, Lorain County, Ohio
- Died: June 27, 1916 (aged 83) Elyria, Ohio
- Resting place: Elyria
- Party: Republican
- Spouse: Betsey A. Terrell

Washington Wallace Boynton (January 27, 1833 – June 27, 1916) was an American Republican politician in the U.S. state of Ohio who was in the Ohio House of Representatives and was a judge on the Ohio Supreme Court 1877–1881.

Washington Wallace Boynton was born on a farm in Russia Township, Lorain County, Ohio. His parents, General Lewis D. and Ruth Wellman Boynton, were natives of Maine. From age sixteen he taught school, and was in charge of a select school in South Amherst, and was county school examiner.

Boynton studied law with his uncle, Elbridge Gerry Boynton, of Elyria, Ohio, and was admitted to the bar in 1856. In 1858, he was chosen Prosecuting Attorney of Lorain County. In the fall of 1863, he discontinued his practice due to ill health, and traveled to Minneapolis, Minnesota. He returned to Ohio the next year, and in 1865 he was elected to a single term in the Ohio House of Representatives. He authored a resolution to strike the word "white" from the provisions of the Ohio Constitution regarding suffrage. It failed at the ballot box, but was adopted when the Federal Constitution was amended.

In 1869, Boynton was appointed by Governor Hayes as Common Pleas Judge, and was elected by the people to that position in 1871, serving until he resigned to take a seat on the Supreme Court.

In 1876, Boynton was elected to the Ohio Supreme Court, and resigned in 1881 due to poor health and meager salary. He returned to private practice at Cleveland. After 1906, he retired from professional work and moved to Elyria.

Boynton was married December 29, 1859 to Betsey A. Terrell of North Ridgeville, Ohio. Boynton helped found and was president of the Elyria Memorial Hospital. He helped found the Gates Home for Crippled Children. He was a director of the Savings Deposit Bank and Trust Company of Elyria. Boynton died at home in Elyria June 27, 1916, and was buried in Ridgelawn Cemetery. He had no children.

== Notes ==
Legal offices
Preceded by George Rex	Associate Justice of the Ohio Supreme Court; 1877–1881	Succeeded by Nicholas Longworth II
Ohio House of Representatives
Preceded by Sidney S. Warner	Representative from Lorain County; 1866–1867	Succeeded by Joseph H. Dickson

Justices of the Ohio Supreme Court 1877–1881
1877	William White; 2/10/1864-3/12/1883	George Rex; 9/11/1874-2/9/1877	John Welch; 2/1865-2/1878	George W. McIlvaine; 2/9/1871-2/1886	William J. Gilmore; 2/9/1875-2/9/1880
1877	William White; 2/10/1864-3/12/1883	Washington W. Boynton; 2/8/1877-11/9/1881	John Welch; 2/1865-2/1878	George W. McIlvaine; 2/9/1871-2/1886	William J. Gilmore; 2/9/1875-2/9/1880
1878	William White	Washington W. Boynton	John Welch	George W. McIlvaine	William J. Gilmore
1878	William White	Washington W. Boynton	John W. Okey; 2/9/1878-7/25/1885	George W. McIlvaine	William J. Gilmore
1879	William White	Washington W. Boynton	John W. Okey	George W. McIlvaine	William J. Gilmore
1880	William White	Washington W. Boynton	John W. Okey	George W. McIlvaine	William J. Gilmore
1880	William White	Washington W. Boynton	John W. Okey	George W. McIlvaine	William Wartenbee Johnson; 2/1880-11/1886
1881	William White	Washington W. Boynton	John W. Okey	George W. McIlvaine	William Wartenbee Johnson
1881	William White	Nicholas Longworth II; 11/9/1881-3/9/1883	John W. Okey	George W. McIlvaine	William Wartenbee Johnson
