= Samuel M. Jones =

American politician & businessman

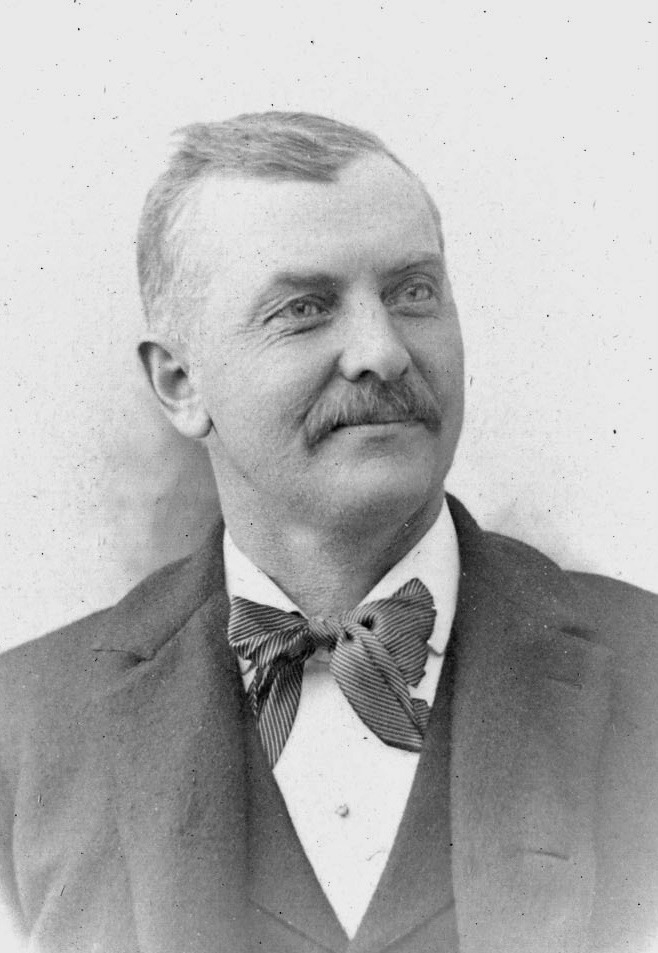

32nd Mayor of Toledo
- In office 1897 – July 12, 1904
- Preceded by: Guy G. Major
- Succeeded by: Robert H. Finch

Personal details
- Born: Samuel Milton Jones; August 3, 1846 Caernarvonshire, Wales
- Died: July 12, 1904 (aged 57)
- Resting place: Woodlawn Cemetery, Toledo, Ohio
- Party: Republican (pre-1899), Independent (1899 to his death)
- Children: Percy Curtis Jones (1878-1941); Eva Bell Jones (1879-1881); Paul Hugh Jones (1884-1951); Mason Beach Jones (1897-1968)
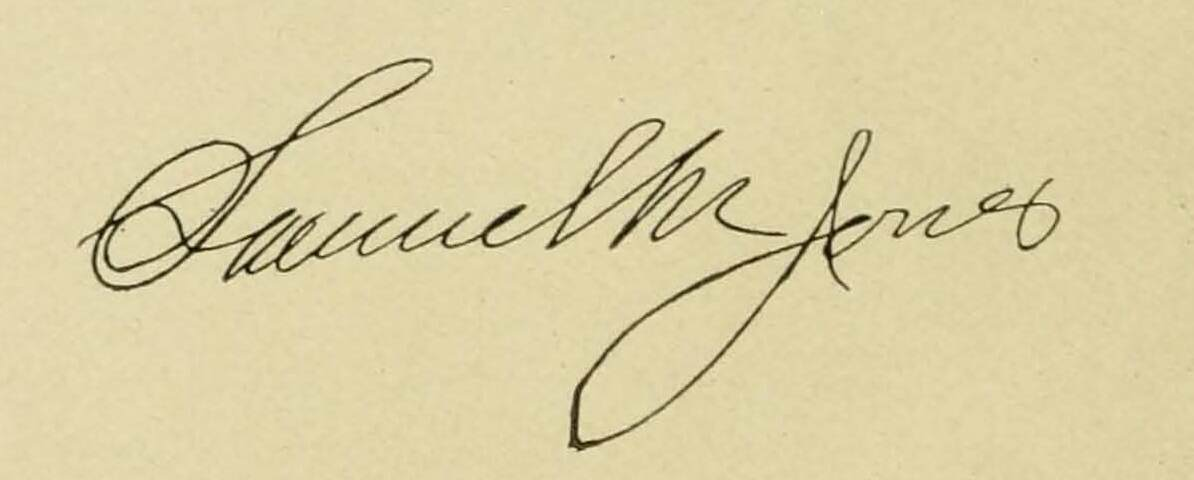
- Signature
- Nickname: "Golden Rule" Jones

Samuel Milton "Golden Rule" Jones (1846–1904) was a Progressive-Era Mayor of Toledo, Ohio from 1897 until his death in 1904. Jones was famous for his outspoken advocacy of the proverbial ethic of reciprocity or "Golden Rule," hence his nickname.

Jones was a well-known advocate of municipal reform. He oversaw implementation of a series of humane modifications of the city of Toledo's administration during his tenure as mayor. In 1993, a panel of 69 scholars ranked him the fifth best mayor in American history. He has sometimes been described as an excentric. Jones' family was impoverished when Samuel was 3 years old, they immigrated to the United States in search of economic opportunity, winding up in central New York.

Owing to the family's poverty, Jones was forced to work from a very young age and he received little formal education. After working for a time on his family's small farm, he left at age 14 to take work in a sawmill. From age 16 he began working summers aboard a steamship.

When he was 18, Jones made his way to Titusville, Pennsylvania to try to find work in the booming oil industry of Western Pennsylvania. He was initially unsuccessful there and he returned to New York the next year, where he found employment and managed to save up a modest sum of money over the next three years.

== Business career ==
Jones returned to Pennsylvania at the age of 22, where he began to speculatively invest his small nest egg in oil leases, from which he began to accumulate wealth and would spend the next 15 years in the Pennsylvania oil industry.

Following the death of his first wife, Jones and his children left Pennsylvania for the oil fields of Ohio in 1886. It was there that he helped established the Ohio Oil Company, a firm which was later bought by Standard Oil Company.

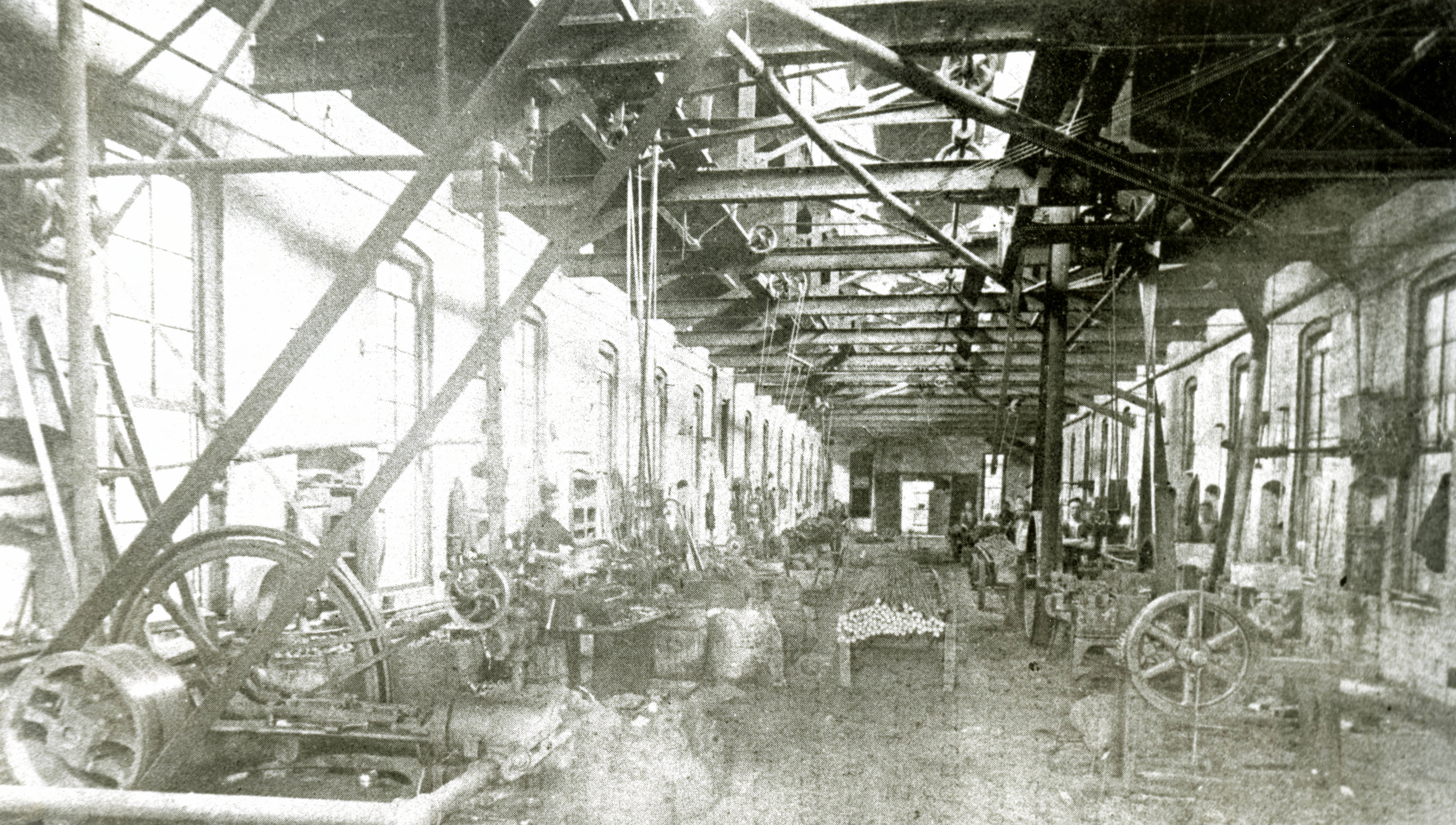
Interior of the ACME Sucker Rod Company factory, Toledo, Ohio, 1900s

In 1892, Jones moved to Toledo, Ohio, the first time that he had lived in a large city. The next year, the Panic of 1893 erupted, with the United States into a depression and millions of individuals thrown into the grips of poverty. As a man of considerable wealth Jones was not himself personally affected by the misery around him — with an estimated 7,000 people in Lucas County, Ohio rendered indigent and the city of Toledo forced millions of dollars in debt — but he nevertheless seems to have been emotionally affected by the economic collapse.

Jones turned his talents to mechanical invention, obtaining a patent in 1894 for a new variety of iron pumping rod for deep well drilling. He opened a manufacturing plant in Toledo that same year for the manufacture of these so-called "sucker rods" for the oil industry — the Acme Sucker Rod Company. This marked a new career turn for Jones, from that of a mineral rights speculator and oil drilling operator to that of an employer of wage labor in a factory setting.

Jones made the decision to operate his new enterprise in accord with some of the emerging ideas about workplace reform. Whereas the prevailing wage in the depressed local economy stood at $1.00–$1.50 a day (equivalent to $39–$58 in 2025), Jones paid his employees a living wage of $1.50 to $2.00 a day (equivalent to $58–$77 in 2025). Jones implemented the 8-hour day for his workers and offered them paid vacation, revenue-sharing, and subsidized meals in a company cafeteria. Jones also contributed to workplace culture by paying for instruments for employees so that they could form a company band. Instead of a lengthy list of company regulations governing employee behavior, Acme Sucker Rod posted only one rule on the company notice board: "The golden rule: Do unto others as you would do unto yourself."

Jones's largesse in the face of general misery grew to legendary proportions among residents of Toledo, and he earned the popular moniker "Golden Rule" Jones in response to his generosity.

== Mayor of Toledo ==
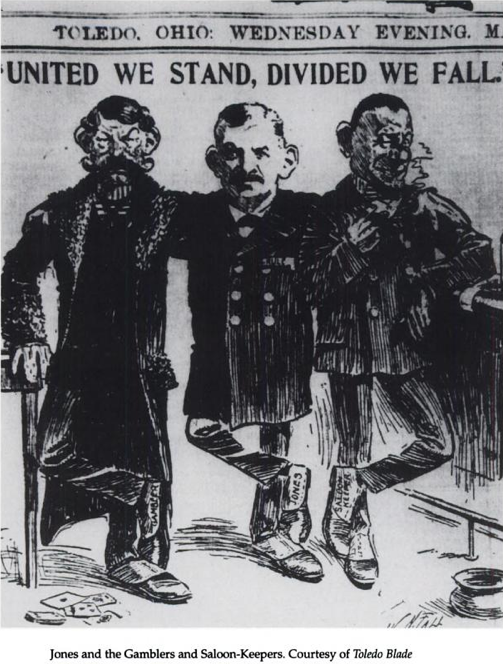
"Jones and the Gamblers and Saloon-Keepers." Contemporary cartoon from the Toledo Blade.

In 1897, Jones received the Republican nomination for mayor of Toledo. Workers liked his golden rule policy and united behind him, and he won the mayoral election. He strove to improve conditions for the working class of his community.

Again based on his belief in the Golden Rule, Jones:

- opened free kindergartens
- developed a park system
- established playgrounds for children
- established free public baths
- instituted an eight-hour day for city workers
- took away truncheons from the police
- refused to enforce blue laws
- reformed the city government

These policies made Jones unpopular with the Toledo's business community and his tolerance of saloons caused him to lose the support of many moral reformers. When his term was over in 1899, Jones was not re-nominated by the Republicans. He ran as an independent instead under the slogan "Principle Before Party" winning a second term with 70% of the vote. He was re-elected in 1901 with 57% of the vote, and again in 1903 with 48% of the vote in a three-way race.

Progressive journalist and lawyer Brand Whitlock, who succeeded Jones as mayor and continued Jones' reform efforts, portrayed Jones as almost lighthearted in his approach to reform, especially when upsetting norms observed by the police:

[H]e was most in his element when the police judge was absent, as he was now and then. In that exigency the law gave Jones, as mayor, the power to appoint the acting police judge; and when Jones did not go down and sit as magistrate himself, he appointed me; and we always found some reason or other for letting all the culprits go.

Police frustration with Jones led the Ohio General Assembly, which Republicans dominated, to enact a statute taking control of the Toledo police department away from the mayor and giving it instead to a commission appointed by the governor. In 1902, however, the Ohio Supreme Court struck the statute down as violative of the Ohio Constitution after Jones mounted a legal challenge.

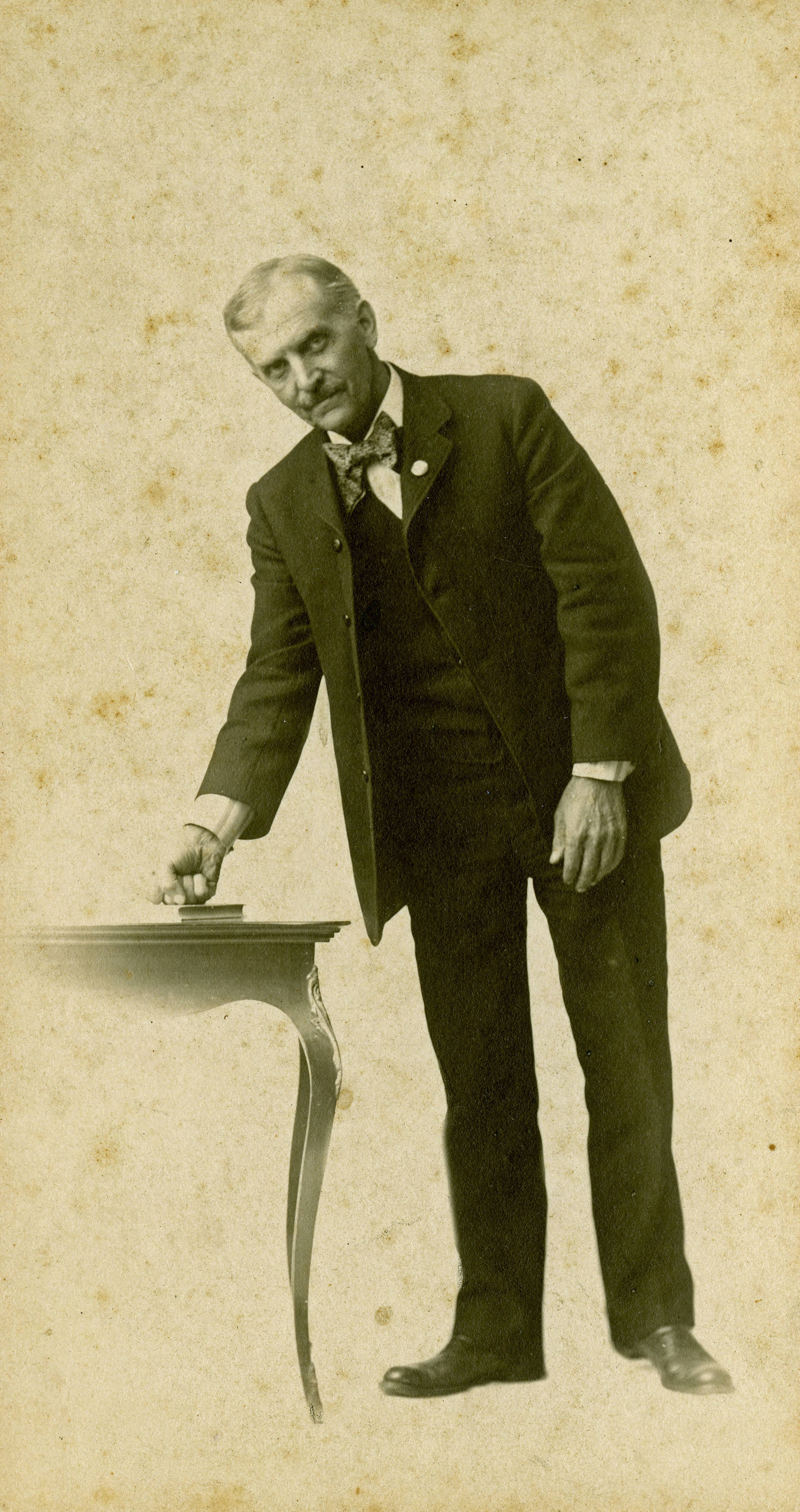
One of a series of photographs Jones produced describing his speaking poses, in this case "Clinching a Point"

== Legacy ==
Jones was a Republican in his early life and political career, however, after continuing to espouse ideals more in line with Christian socialism, the party refused to nominate him for his final term in office. Even the Socialist Party of his day "promptly disowned him, and were at one with the capitalists in their hatred and abuse of him", though none of this seemed to bother Jones, who wrote to then-President Theodore Roosevelt just months before his death: "As you are aware, I am a man without a party. It is enough for me to be a patriot without trying at the same time to be both a patriot and a partisan."

He was influenced by Henry George, but argued in his 1899 book:

... is not our whole civilization essentially a social product? Back of every inventor stands a thousand others who made his invention possible. Back of every enterprising capitalist stands the entire nation, without which not one of his schemes could succeed. ... No man can point to his pile of gold and say 'Alone I earned it.' What is called Socialism is not a visionary plan for remodeling society; it is a present fact, which is not yet recognized in the distribution of wealth.

— Samuel M. Jones, The new right; a plea for fair play through a more just social order, p. 239

Brand Whitlock wrote an extended, admiring discussion of Jones in his 1914 autobiography, Forty Years of It, stating:

There is no monument to Golden Rule Jones in Toledo; and since St. Gaudens is gone I know of no one who could conceive him in marble or in bronze. There is not a public building which he erected, no reminder of him which the eye can see or the hands touch. But his name is spoken here a thousand times a day, and always with the reverence that marks the passage of a great man upon the earth. And I am sure that his influence did not end here.

— Brand Whitlock, Forty Years of It, XXIV, p. 140

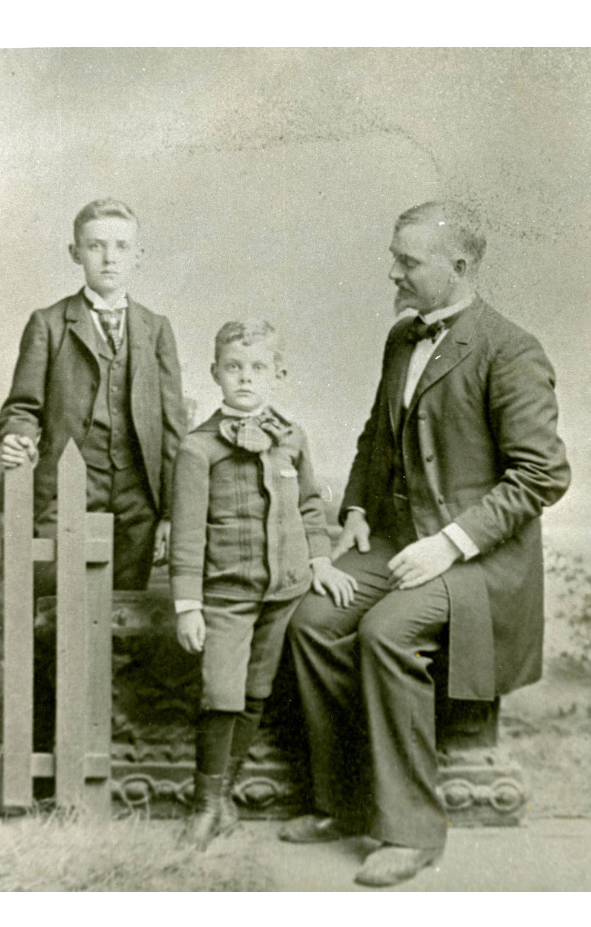
Portrait of Jones with sons, Percy (right) and Paul (center)

According to historian Robert M. Crunden, Jones was "one of the genuine eccentrics in American history" and "a self-made American businessman who for some unknown reason decided that business, politics, and religion were somehow all the same, and spent the last decade of his life trying to convince others."

In his will, Jones left a "Golden Rule Trust" to his factory workers for $10,000 (equivalent to $358,333 in 2025).

A 1993 survey of historians, political scientists, and urban experts conducted by Melvin G. Holli of the University of Illinois at Chicago ranked Jones as the fifth-best American big-city mayor to serve between the years 1820 and 1993.

== Personal life ==
Jones married his first wife, Alma B Curtis, and had three children; sons Percy Curtis Jones (born 1878) and Paul Hugh Jones (born 1884), and a daughter, Eva Bell Jones (born 1879). His daughter died in December 1881, at the age of 2, and Alma died Christmas Eve in 1885. Jones remarried Helen Beach, daughter of a prominent Toledo family, in 1892, and relocated to her hometown from Lima, Ohio shortly thereafter. The couple had one child together, Mason Beach Jones (born 1897).

Jones died suddenly during his third term as mayor on July 12, 1904. Citizens of Toledo lined the streets to view his funeral procession.

== See also ==
- List of mayors of Toledo, Ohio
