= Carl Henry Keller =

American politician (1875–1952)

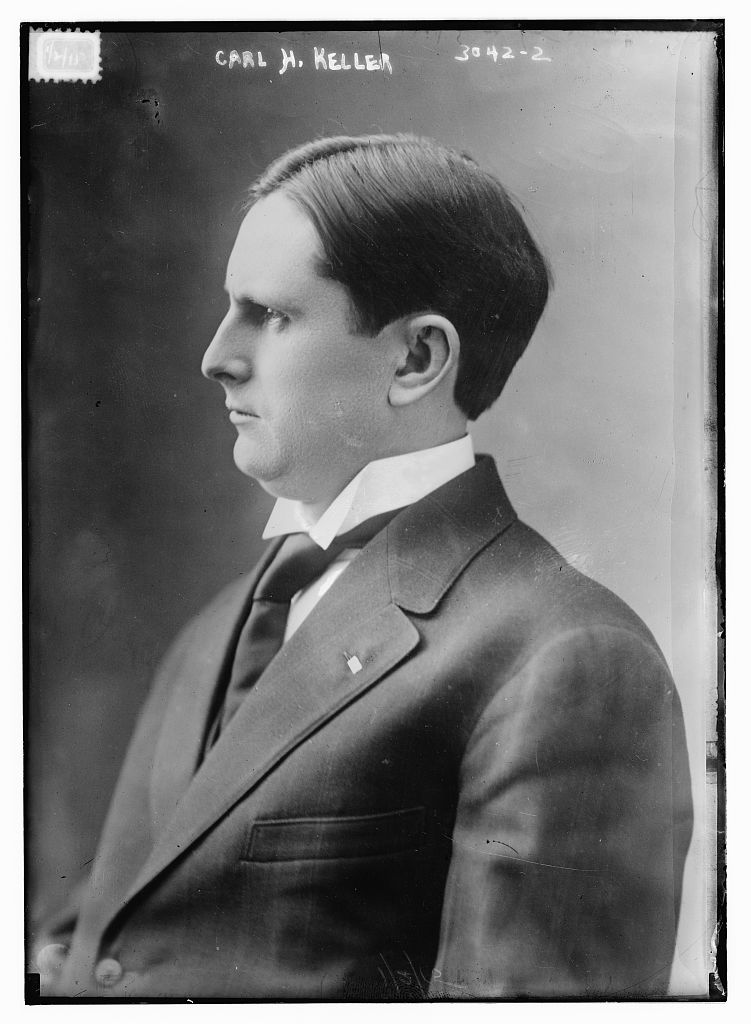

35th Mayor of Toledo, Ohio
- In office 1914–1915
- Preceded by: Brand Whitlock
- Succeeded by: Charles M. Milroy

Personal details
- Born: January 9, 1875; Ohio, U.S.
- Died: March 29, 1952 (aged 77); Osceola County, Florida, U.S.
- Political party: Republican
- Spouse: Mame Sophia Duetscher
- Parent(s): John Jacob Keller; Christiana Mathias
- Profession: Politician

Carl Henry Keller (January 9, 1875 – March 29, 1952) was an American politician who served as the 35th mayor of Toledo, Ohio, from 1914 to 1915.

== Biography ==
He was born on January 9, 1875, in Ohio to John Jacob Keller and Christiana Mathias. Keller married Mame Sophia Duetscher. He was elected mayor of Toledo, Ohio, in 1914 and served till 1915. In 1914 Governor James M. Cox received a request for Keller to be removed from office as he has accused of permitting gambling. He died on March 29, 1952, in Osceola County, Florida.

== Gallery ==
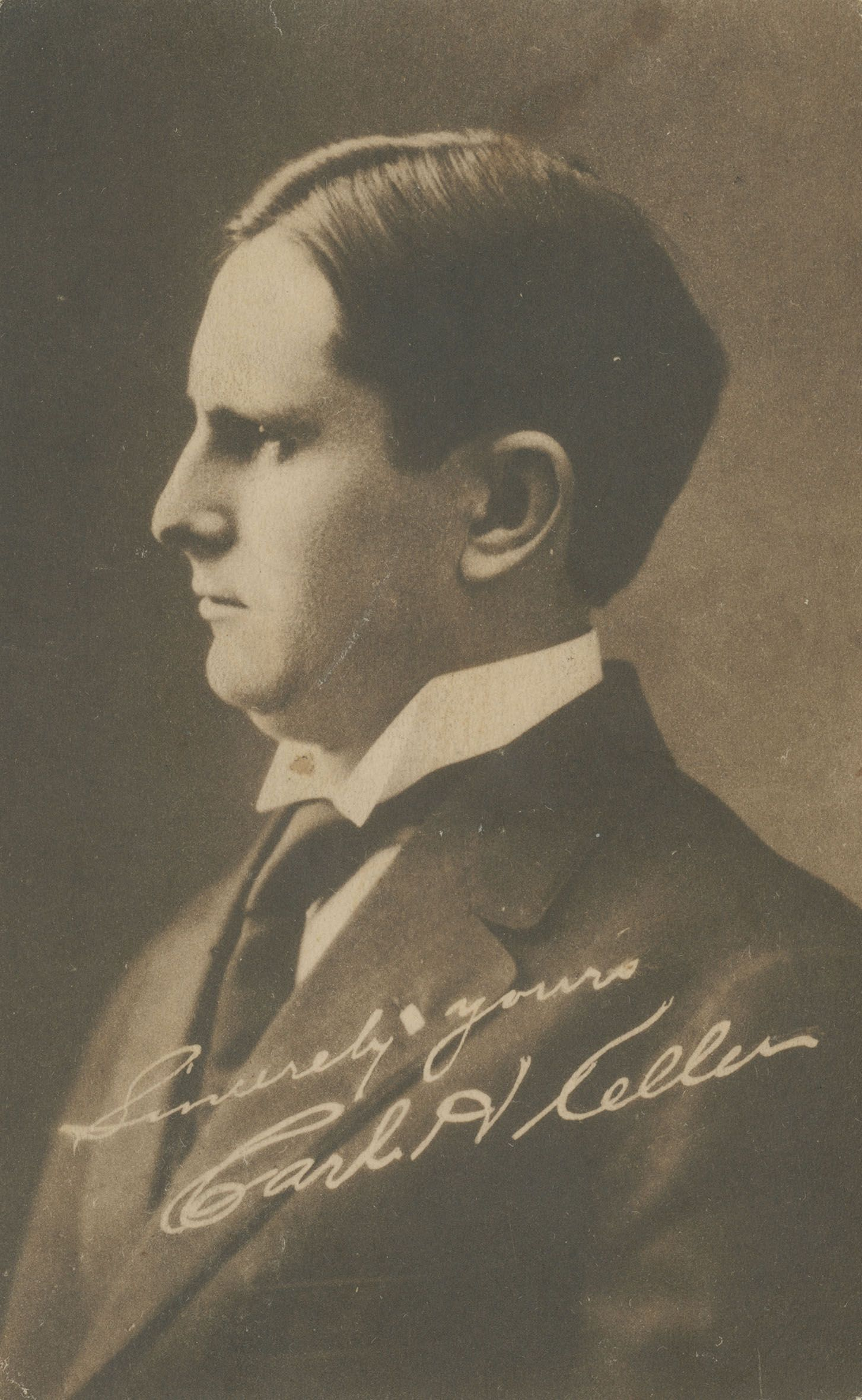
Front view of postcard sent to the mayor's supporter

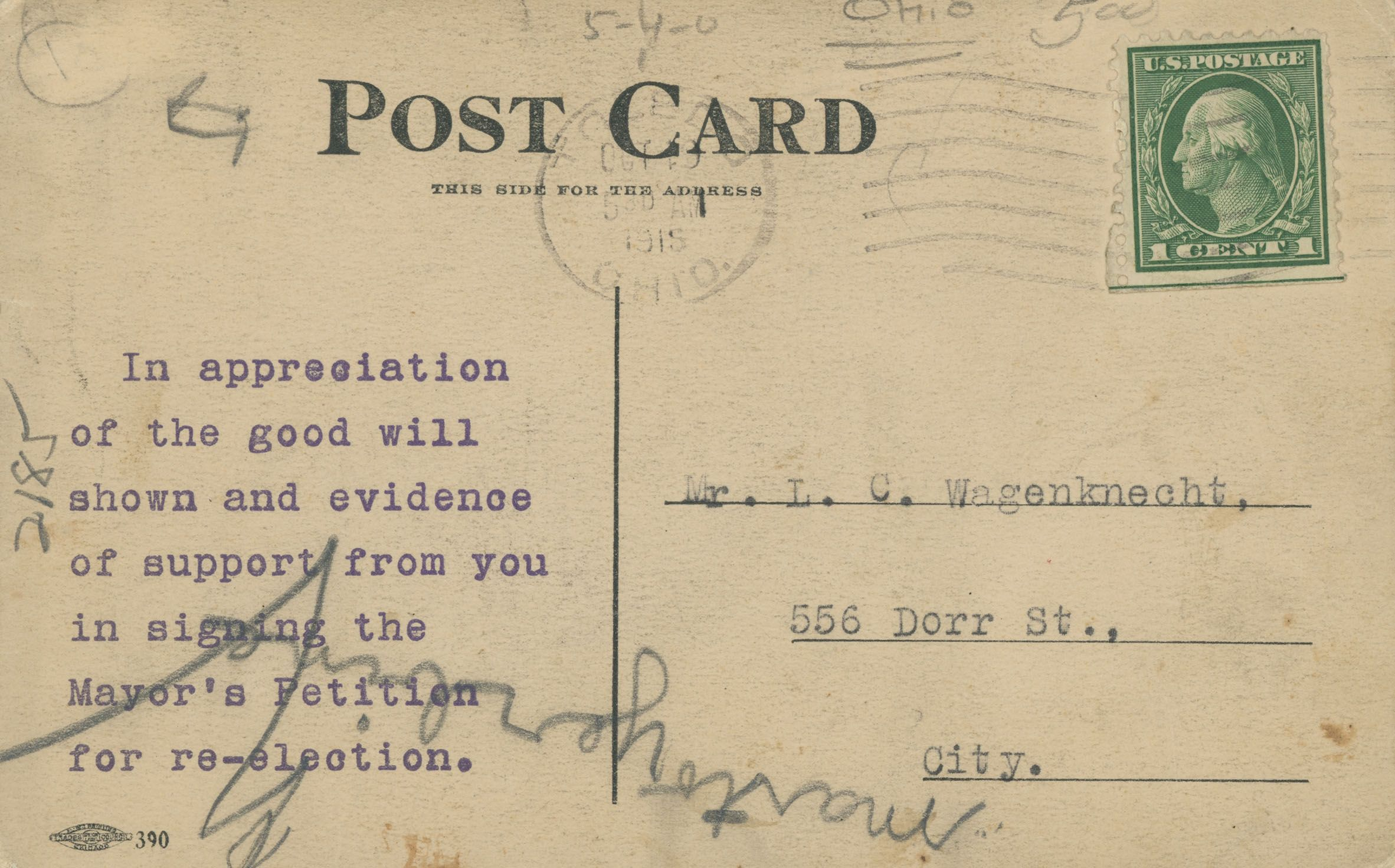
Rear view of postcard sent to the mayor's supporter
