= Walter F. Stone =

American judge

Walter Freeman Stone
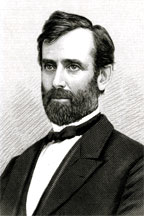

Ohio Supreme Court Associate Justice
- In office February 23, 1873 – September 10, 1874
- Appointed by: Edward Follansbee Noyes
- Preceded by: William H. West
- Succeeded by: George Rex

Personal details
- Born: November 18, 1822 Wooster, Ohio
- Died: December 23, 1874 (aged 52) Oakland, California
- Resting place: Oakland Cemetery, Sandusky, Ohio
- Party: Republican
- Spouse: Cordelia A. Hitchcock
- Children: three

Walter Freeman Stone (November 18, 1822 – December 23, 1874) was a Republican politician who was a justice of the Supreme Court of Ohio from 1873 to 1874.

Walter Stone was born at Wooster, Ohio. His father died when he was young, but left adequate means that Stone received an education. He studied law in Pittsburgh, where he studied under Walter H. Lowrie, who would later be Chief Justice of the Pennsylvania Supreme Court, and in Cleveland, and was admitted to the bar in 1845 in Cleveland.

In 1846, Stone moved to Sandusky, where he established partnerships with judge A. W. Hendry, and later with Ebenezer Lane, who had served on the Ohio Supreme Court for 15 years, and his son William G. Lane as Lane, Stone & Lane until 1865. He was initially a Democrat, but joined the Free Soil Party in 1849. He was elected Common Pleas Judge in 1865 and re-elected in 1870. In 1873 he was appointed by Governor Noyes to the Ohio Supreme Court when William H. West resigned. He was nominated by the Republicans, and elected to the remainder of the term in 1873, but had to resign in August 1874.

Stone married Cordelia A. Hitchcock on June 5, 1851, and they had three children. Stone retired to Oakland, California for his health, but died December 23, 1874. His funeral was January 5, 1875 in Sandusky, with burial in Oakland Cemetery in that city.

== See also ==
- List of justices of the Ohio Supreme Court

== Notes ==
Legal offices
| Preceded by William H. West | Associate Justice of the Ohio Supreme Court; 1873-1874 | Succeeded by George Rex |
