= Robert Clarke & Company =

Publishing company

Coordinates: 39°5′59.26″N 84°30′49.24″W

Robert Clarke & Company was a book publishing company and bookseller in Cincinnati, Ohio, from 1858 to 1909. After 1894, it was known as The Robert Clarke Company. It published literary and historical works.

== Leadership ==
Robert Clarke was born May 1, 1829, at Annan, Dumfrieshire, Scotland, and came with his parents to Cincinnati, Ohio, in 1840. He was educated at public schools and Woodward College. He was a bookkeeper for William Hanna, and then became a proprietor of a second-hand bookstore near the corner of 6th and Walnut St. In 1858, in partnership with John W. Dale and Roderick D. Barney, he bought out the large Cincinnati publishing and bookjobbing firm H. W. Derby & Co., renaming it Robert Clarke & Co. In 1874, Howard Barney and Alexander Hill entered the firm.

In 1894, the firm was renamed The Robert Clarke Company with a board composed of the same gentlemen. Robert Clarke died at his home library in Glendale, Ohio, on August 27, 1899. The firm lost its plant in a February, 1903 fire, but rebuilt. The firm dissolved in a receiver's sale in 1909.

== Reputation ==
The firm's reputation for access to comprehensive offerings is illustrated by the following testimonials:

the Americana Catalogues of Robert Clarke & Co., of Cincinnati, are the completest booksellers' list of that kind which are published in America.

— Justin Winsor, 1884

Many of the books above mentioned are old and not easily obtainable at ordinary bookstores. For information concerning such books, or for obtaining them if desired, I would advise the reader to apply to The Robert Clarke Company, Cincinnati, Ohio, who keep by far the largest collection of books on America that can be found on sale in this country.

— John Fiske, 1907

== Selected publications ==
- Clarke, Robert (1887). Bibliotheca Americana: Catalogue of a Valuable Collection of Books and Pamphlets Relating to America. Robert Clarke & Company.
- Lytle, William Haines (1894). Venable, William H. (ed.). Poems of William Haines Lytle. Cincinnati: The Robert Clarke Company.
- Smith, William Henry, ed. (1882). The Life and Public Services of Arthur St. Clair. Robert Clarke & Company. - two volumes
- Reid, Whitelaw (1895). Ohio in the War Her Statesmen Generals and Soldiers. Cincinnati: The Robert Clarke Company. - two volumes
- Venable, W. H. (1891). Beginnings of Literary Culture in the Ohio Valley. Cincinnati, Ohio: Robert Clarke & Company.
- Russell, Addison Peale (1882). Thomas Corwin: a sketch. Cincinnati: Robert Clarke & Company.
