= Douglas DeGood =

American politician (1947–2019)

55th Mayor of Toledo
- In office 1977–1983
- Preceded by: Harry W. Kessler
- Succeeded by: Donna Owens

Personal details
- Born: May 4, 1947 Tiffin, Ohio, US
- Died: December 1, 2019 (aged 72) Washington, D.C., US
- Party: Democratic
- Education: University of Toledo

Douglas Kent DeGood (May 4, 1947 – December 1, 2019), was an American Democratic politician who served as the mayor of Toledo, Ohio from 1977 until 1983.

== Background ==
DeGood was born in Tiffin, Ohio, to Freda and Kenneth DeGood, and moved to Toledo in 1956. He graduated from Whitmer High School and University of Toledo, earning bachelor's and master's degrees in political science. He served as the program director for a local YMCA branch, and as a member of the Lucas County Board of Education.

== Political career ==
=== Toledo city council ===
In 1973, DeGood ran for Toledo City Council, but did not succeed in the primary elections. In January 1975, he was appointed to the council to fill an unexpired term of councilwoman Carol Peitrykowski, who had been appointed to Lucas County Clerk of Courts. He was elected to a full two-year term the following fall, and served on the council until 1977.

=== Mayor of Toledo ===
DeGood successfully ran for city mayor in 1977 as a member of the Democratic Party. He defeated Republican opponent Max Reddish, and succeeded the incumbent Harry W. Kessler, who he considered a friend and mentor. DeGood's election made him the youngest mayor of a large city in the United States, at the age of 30.

On July 1, 1979, strained city finances and negotiation breakdowns with police and fire department unions led to an illegal two-day strike of safety workers. This resulted in numerous fires, destroyed property, and the murder of a city bus driver during a robbery, which brought national media attention to the problem. The stress of the events caused DeGood to collapse in his office, requiring hospitalization for 24 hours. A court injunction later required the workers to return to duty, which they agreed to, and negotiations resumed.

DeGood ran for a second term and was re-elected in 1979, and again in 1981. During his terms, planning and construction began for the downtown area's Portside Festival Marketplace shopping mall (now Imagination Station) and Seagate complex, the latter being dedicated in 1982. Former city officials considered DeGood's efforts in redeveloping the downtown area as some of his most significant achievements. However, some critics questioned the cost, and claimed that the use of Federal funds could burden small businesses and push them out of the downtown area.

In 1981, voters rejected a 0.5 percent income tax increase, which lead to layoffs of city workers and services cutbacks. Following a year of campaigning by DeGood, voters approved a 0.75 percent increase in 1982.

Despite endorsement from the Democratic Party, DeGood did not run again for any public office after his third term ended in 1983. He started a small business, began consulting, and later moved from the Toledo area.

== Personal life ==
DeGood married his wife Karen in July 1975, and they had two sons, Alex and Kevin. In 2000, DeGood and his wife moved to the Atlanta, Georgia area.

=== Death ===
On December 1, 2019, DeGood died at Georgetown University Hospital, as the result of massive brain injuries he sustained in an accidental fall, while visiting family in Washington, D.C. Funeral services were private and his remains were cremated.
