= Isaac R. Sherwood =

American politician and newspaper editor

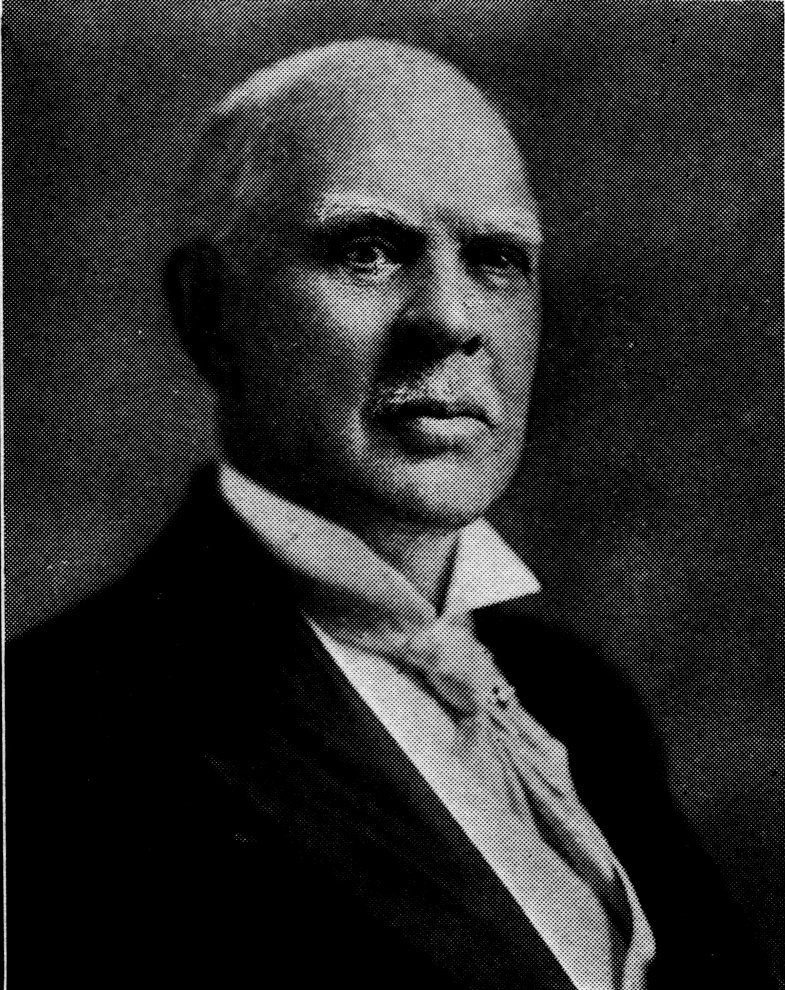

Member of the U.S. House of Representatives from Ohio
- In office March 4, 1923 – March 3, 1925
- Preceded by: William W. Chalmers
- Succeeded by: William W. Chalmers
- Constituency: 9th district
- In office March 4, 1907 – March 3, 1921
- Preceded by: James H. Southard
- Succeeded by: William W. Chalmers
- Constituency: 9th district
- In office March 4, 1873 – March 3, 1875
- Preceded by: John Armstrong Smith
- Succeeded by: Frank H. Hurd
- Constituency: 6th district

18th Ohio Secretary of State
- In office January 11, 1869 – January 13, 1873
- Governor: Rutherford B. Hayes; Edward F. Noyes
- Preceded by: John Russell
- Succeeded by: Allen T. Wikoff

18th Mayor of Toledo
- In office 1861
- Preceded by: Alexander H. Newcomb
- Succeeded by: John Manor

Personal details
- Born: August 13, 1835 Stanford, New York, U.S.
- Died: October 15, 1925 (aged 90) Toledo, Ohio, U.S.
- Resting place: Woodlawn Cemetery, Toledo, Ohio
- Party: Republican; Democratic
- Spouse: Kate Brownlee
- Children: two
- Education: Antioch College

Military service
- Allegiance: United States of America; Union
- Branch/service: United States Army; Union Army
- Rank: Lieutenant Colonel; Bvt. Brigadier General
- Battles/wars: American Civil War

Isaac Ruth Sherwood (August 13, 1835 – October 15, 1925) was an American politician and newspaper editor from Toledo, Ohio, as well as an officer in the Union army during the Civil War. He served nine terms in the United States Congress, and was a noted pacifist during World War I.

== Early life and career ==
Sherwood was born in Stanford, New York. After attending the local public schools, he attended the Hudson River Institute in Claverack, New York, and Antioch College in Ohio. He then studied law at the Ohio Law College in Poland, Ohio. After finishing school in 1857, Sherwood became the editor of the Williams County Gazette in Bryan, Ohio. Sherwood was married to Kate Brownlee Sherwood (1841–1914), a writer of popular patriotic poetry, and together the couple had two children, James and Lenore.

Sherwood first entered politics in October 1860 when he was elected the probate judge of Williams County. Because of the Civil War, Sherwood's term as judge was short.

=== Civil War ===
Soon after President Abraham Lincoln's call for volunteers in April 1861, Sherwood resigned from his judgeship and enlisted as a private in the 14th Ohio Infantry. Sherwood transferred to the 111th Ohio Infantry, initially serving as adjutant, mustering out as the regiment's lieutenant colonel. He participated in the Carolinas campaign, the final major campaign in the Eastern Theater of the war.

On February 25, 1865, President Abraham Lincoln nominated Sherwood for appointment to the grade of brevet brigadier general for conspicuous service during the Battle of Franklin, to rank from February 27, 1865, and the United States Senate confirmed the appointment on March 10, 1865.

After the war he became a companion of the Ohio Commandery of the Military Order of the Loyal Legion of the United States.

== Postbellum career ==
After being mustered out of the military on June 27, 1865, Sherwood moved to Toledo, Ohio. There he became the editor of the Toledo Daily Commercial. He also began writing political editorials for The Cleveland Leader.

=== Political career ===
Once again, Sherwood became involved in Ohio politics as a member of the Republican Party. In 1868 and again in 1870, he was elected as Secretary of State of Ohio. Sherwood successfully ran for the United States House of Representatives in 1872 and served one term.

Once his term in Congress had ended, Sherwood returned to Cleveland and served as the owner and editor of the Toledo Journal from 1875 to 1884. He also remained active in politics during this era. He was elected probate judge of Lucas County in 1878 and again in 1881. In 1885, Sherwood became the editor of the Canton News-Democrat, a position that he continued to hold for the following decade.

=== Return to Congress ===
In the 1870s, Sherwood had briefly supported the platform of the National Greenback Party. In 1879, he chose to identify himself with the Democratic Party with which he remained for the rest of his life. He was nominated Representative of Ohio's 18th congressional district in 1896, but lost. As a Democrat, he was elected to the United States House of Representatives in 1906. Sherwood served for seven straight terms in Congress until he failed to win reelection in 1920. When World War I began, he refused to support the United States declaration of war and refused to vote in favor of the draft. He believed that the United States should not get involved in a European war. Sherwood's pacifist views made him very unpopular in his home state, where Ohioans believed that he was being unpatriotic. He was defeated for reelection in 1920.

In 1922, Sherwood was once again elected to the House of Representatives, but he was defeated in his reelection bid in 1924.

=== Death ===
After completing his term, Sherwood retired from politics and moved back to Toledo. He died there only a few months later and was buried in the city's Woodlawn Cemetery.

== See also ==
- List of American Civil War brevet generals (Union)

== Notes ==
U.S. House of Representatives
Preceded by John A. Smith	Member of the U.S. House of Representatives from Ohio's 6th congressional district 1873–1875	Succeeded by Frank H. Hurd
Preceded by James H. Southard	Member of the U.S. House of Representatives from Ohio's 9th congressional district 1907–1921	Succeeded by William W. Chalmers
Preceded by William W. Chalmers	Member of the U.S. House of Representatives from Ohio's 9th congressional district 1923–1925	Succeeded by William W. Chalmers
Honorary titles
Preceded by Joseph Gurney Cannon	Oldest member of the U.S. House of Representatives; 1923–1925	Succeeded by Charles Manly Stedman
