= John Russell (Ohio politician) =

American politician (1827–1869)

17th Ohio Secretary of State
- In office January, 1868 – January 1869
- Appointed by: Rutherford B. Hayes
- Preceded by: William Henry Smith
- Succeeded by: Isaac R. Sherwood

Personal details
- Born: September 22, 1827 Champaign County, Ohio, US
- Died: December 16, 1869 (aged 42) Urbana, Ohio, US
- Party: Republican
- Spouse: Margaret Russell
- Education: Ohio Wesleyan University

John Russell (1827-1869) was a Republican politician who was appointed Ohio Secretary of State from 1868 to 1869.

Russell was from Champaign County, Ohio. He was chief clerk in the office of Ohio Secretary of State William Henry Smith. Smith resigned the office January 14, 1868. John Russell was appointed by Governor Rutherford B. Hayes to replace him. Later that year, at the State Republican Convention, Russell came in fourth of four candidates for the nomination on the first ballot, and withdrew.

== Biography ==
Russell was born September 22, 1827, in Concord Township, Champaign County, Ohio, to John and Mary Russell, farmers who were originally from Virginia. He taught school and saved his money to enroll in Ohio Wesleyan University in 1849, from which he graduated. He returned home to marry Margaret M. Russell, (no relation).

In 1854, Russell was elected clerk of courts in his county. He served three terms for a total of nine years. He was then appointed to Smith's staff, and then appointed by Rutherford B. Hayes as Ohio Secretary of State.

After his term expired, Russell returned to Urbana and worked in the office of the Collector of Internal Revenue. Russell was nominated and elected to the Ohio State Senate in the fall of 1869, but was struck down by stroke and died December 16, 1869, before he could take his seat. Governor Hayes spoke at his funeral in Urbana.

Russell joined the Methodist Episcopal Church at a young age.

== Notes ==
Political offices
| Preceded by William Henry Smith | Secretary of State of Ohio; 1868–1869 | Succeeded by Isaac R. Sherwood |
