= William Henry Smith (American politician) =

American journalist and politician (1833–96)

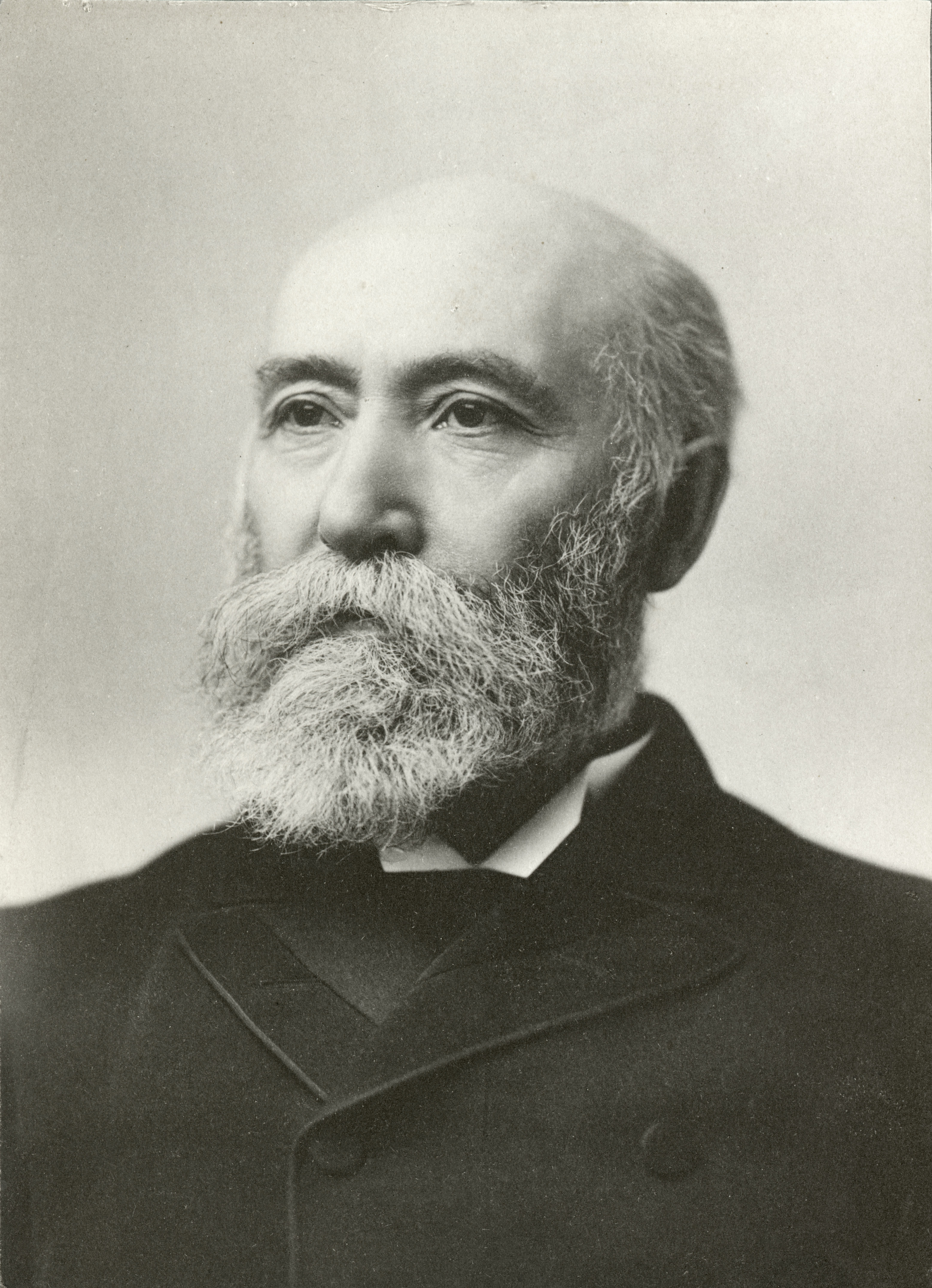

16th Ohio Secretary of State
- In office January 9, 1865 – January 14, 1868
- Governor: John Brough; Charles Anderson; Jacob Dolson Cox
- Preceded by: William W. Armstrong
- Succeeded by: John Russell

Personal details
- Born: December 1, 1833 Columbia County, New York, US
- Died: July 27, 1896 (aged 62) Lake Forest, Illinois, US
- Party: Republican
- Spouse: Emeline Reynolds
- Children: Delavan Smith

William Henry Smith (December 1, 1833 – July 27, 1896) was a newspaper editor, Republican politician who was Ohio Secretary of State 1865–1868, consolidated and managed the Associated Press, and was a compiler and editor of several historic works.

== Biography ==
William Henry Smith was born December 1, 1833, at Columbia County, New York. In 1836 his parents moved to Ohio, where he received the best educational advantages the state afforded. He was a tutor, editor of the Literary Review at Cincinnati, and was an editor at the Cincinnati Gazette when the American Civil War broke out. He was active in promoting enlistments for the Union.

Smith was active in securing the gubernatorial nomination for John Brough, and became his private secretary upon his election to Governor in 1863. In 1864 he resigned when nominated by the Republicans for Ohio Secretary of State, and defeated incumbent Democrat William W. Armstrong in the general election. He was nominated again in 1866, and defeated Democrat Benjamin Le Fevre.

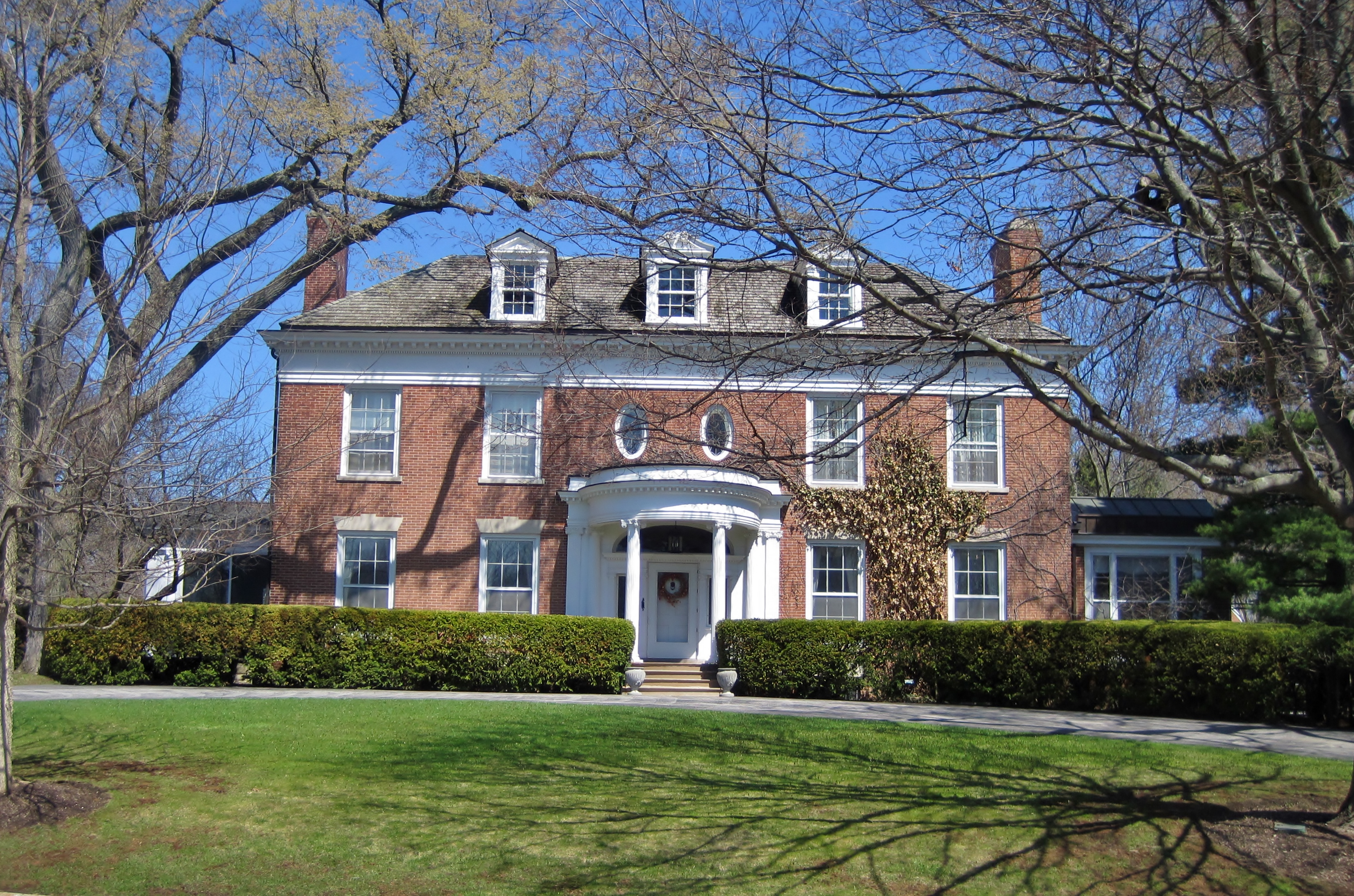
Smith's estate in Lake Forest, Illinois

Smith resigned as Secretary January 14, 1868 to run the Cincinnati Chronicle for a short time until failing health caused his resignation. In 1870 he took charge of the Western Associated Press in Chicago. In 1877, President Hayes appointed him Collector of the Port of Chicago. In January, 1883, he led the merger of the Western Associated Press and the New York Associated Press, and was General Manager of the company.

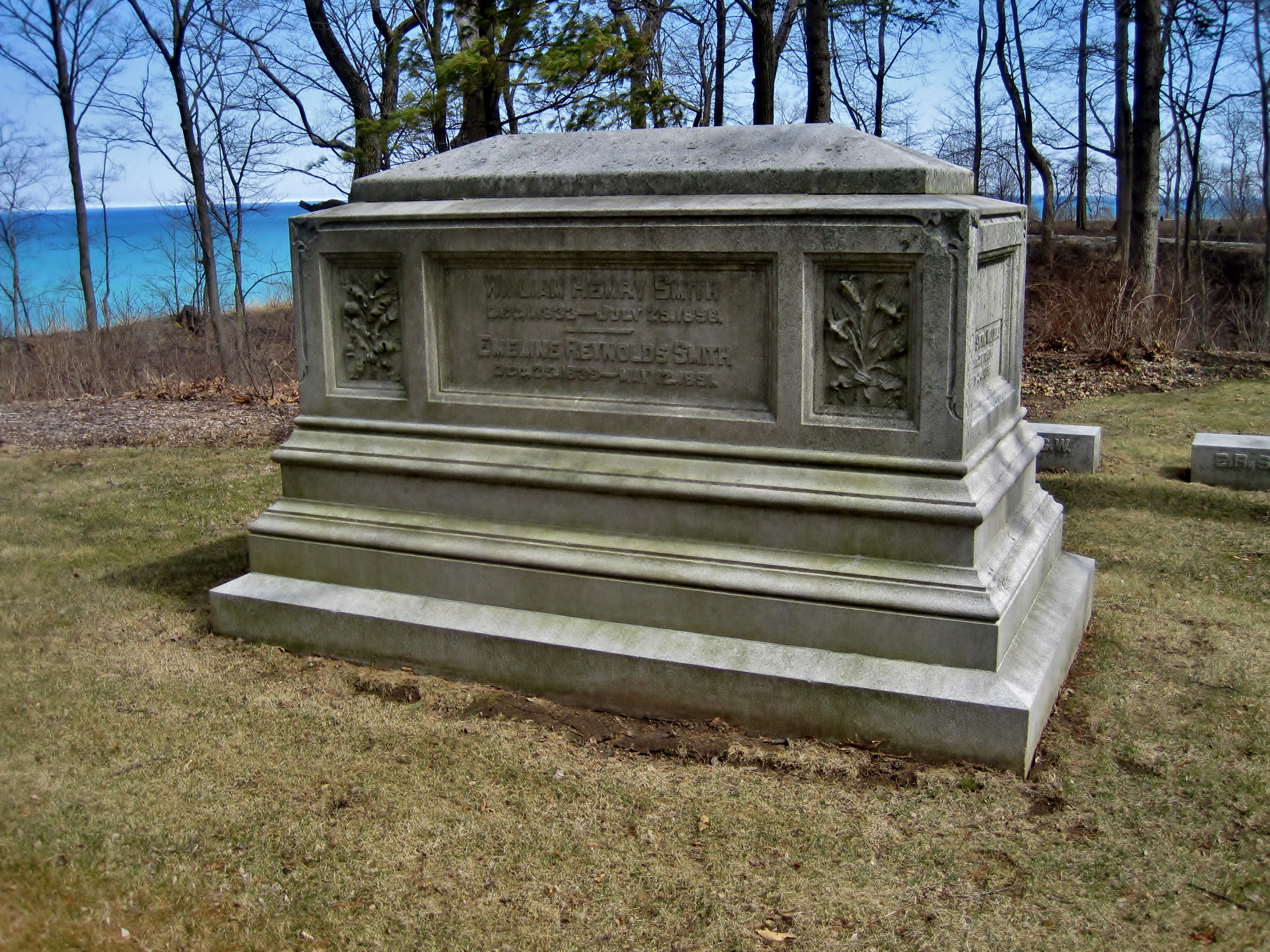
Smith's monument in Lake Forest Cemetery

Smith also compiled and edited historic works, including the St. Clair Papers in 1882. He died July 27, 1896, in Lake Forest, Illinois, and was interred at Lake Forest Cemetery.

== Works ==
- Smith, William Henry, ed. (1882). The Life and Public Services of Arthur St Clair. Vol. 1. Robert Clarke & Company. ISBN 978-0-598-28691-8.
- Smith, William Henry, ed. (1882). The Life and Public Services of Arthur St Clair. Vol. 2. Robert Clarke & Company. ISBN 9780598286918.

== Notes ==
Political offices
Preceded by William W. Armstrong	Secretary of State of Ohio; 1865–1868	Succeeded by John Russell
