= The City Beautiful (novel) =

2021 novel by Aden Polydoros

- Author: Aden Polydoros
- Genre: Historical fantasy, young adult, gothic, thriller
- Publisher: Inkyard Press
- Publication date: 5 October 2021
- Pages: 480
- ISBN: 978-1-335-40250-9

The City Beautiful is a 2021 young adult and historical fantasy novel by Aden Polydoros, about a gay Jewish teenager possessed by a vengeful dybbuk in 19th-century Chicago. The novel won the Sydney Taylor Book Award, and was nominated for the National Jewish Book Award, the Lambda Literary Award, and the World Fantasy Award.

== Background and development ==
Polydoros was inspired to write The City Beautiful after reading an article about real-life serial-killer H. H. Holmes. He wrote the novel as part of an independent study in his undergraduate degree.

== Synopsis ==
The novel follows Alter Rosen, a 17-year-old Romanian Jewish immigrant in Chicago in 1893. Alter works at a Yiddish newspaper to pay his family's passage from Europe. He avoided death as an infant but believes he curses the people around him to die, including his father. He is in love with his roommate, Yakov Kogan. When Yakov is found dead at the Chicago World's Fair, Alter becomes suspicious that he was murdered, one in a string of disappeared Jewish boys.

Alter helps to prepare Yakov's body for burial but falls into the ritual bath and has a vision that their bodies fuse together. Alter begins to have visions and hallucinations that parallel Yakov's experiences (like feeling pain where Yakov was injured) and sometimes loses control of his actions.

Alter is joined in his investigation of the disappearances by his neighbour Raizel Ackermann and his old friend Frankie Portnoy, who both also know missing or dead boys. Frankie leads a gang of young thieves, which Alter left after witnessing Frankie beat up a man. Frankie is now also a boxer, but faces antisemitism from his wealthy patrons. Although Alter dislikes Frankie's work, the two become close again. Alter struggles with his attraction to Frankie, at one point kissing him and later denying it meant anything.

Alter, Frankie, and Raizel investigate at a club that idolises serial killers, invited by Frankie's patron, Whitby. Whitby introduces them to his friend Gregory, who has a tattoo of a dragon on his arm. They find no leads, but Alter starts uncontrollably raving about dead Jewish boys in Europe. With his visions becoming more intense, Alter confesses to Frankie about it. Frankie suggests Alter is possessed by Yakov's dybbuk and takes him for an exorcism. Although the possession will eventually kill him, Alter refuses the exorcism, fearing it will destroy both Yakov and himself. Instead, he plans to end the possession by killing Yakov's murderer.

Another dead Jewish boy is found in a meatpacking factory, and they suspect that the factory's owner, Katz — the same man Frankie beat up the year before — is the murderer. Alter sneaks into the factory but is captured by Katz, who admits to sexually abusing boys, including Frankie. Frankie and Raizel arrive, and goaded by Katz, Alter admits his love for Frankie. A fight ensues where Frankie kills Katz.

In the aftermath, Frankie tells Alter that Katz lured him with a job offer, and he turned to thieving to avoid further abuse. Frankie confesses his love to Alter; while Alter fears violating the biblical commandment against homosexuality, Frankie argues that the prohibition is actually against sexual abuse.

With Katz dead, Alter assumes Yakov has left. However, there is another killing, meaning Katz was not the murderer and Alter is still possessed. In a vision, Yakov tells Alter that his family died when their synagogue was burned by Tugarin Zmeyevich, the name of a mythical dragon. Alter remembers Gregory's dragon tattoo and realises that Gregory is the murderer. Gregory has been following the World's Fair, killing Jewish boys, and Whitby is now helping him. Yakov had followed Gregory for vengeance, but was murdered instead.

Frankie goes after Gregory alone, but gets injured. He warns Alter that Gregory will set a fire at the World's Fair. Alter almost dies confronting Gregory, experiencing purgatory where he watches his father buried at sea again and again. However, Yakov pushes him to live. Alter and Raizel follow Gregory to an unfinished synagogue, which he plans to burn to destroy a Jewish neighbourhood. While ranting about his hatred of Jews, Gregory gets tangled up in ropes and is strangled to death. With Yakov avenged, Alter undergoes the ritual purification of a corpse, and Yakov finally leaves Alter's body.

Frankie and Alter recover, and Frankie suggests that Alter come to work with him again: He’ll stop stealing, and instead support Jewish immigrants adjusting to life in America. The two begin a relationship.

A year later, Alter's mother and sisters arrive in Chicago, greeted by Alter and Frankie. His sisters admire the buildings of the World's Fair, which is now over. Alter reflects on how the beautiful but empty World's Fair is like America as a whole.

== Themes ==
The novel deals with themes of antisemitism, labour exploitation, and immigration. It incorporates Jewish folklore: for example, Polydoros suggested in an interview that the dybbuk and the way it overtakes Alter is an embodiment of Alter's grief and trauma. It also incorporates elements of the gothic, and has been described as a 'gothic thriller'.

== Reception ==
The New York Public Library included The City Beautiful on its Best Books for Teens 2021 list. Kirkus Reviews described the book as "slow-moving but compelling", and praised the combination of a detailed historical setting with fantasy elements. In a review for the Jewish Book Council, Sascha Lamb praises the depiction of different levels of Jewish religious observance among the characters, and how the novel affirms both Alter's religious observance and his self-acceptance as queer. Lamb considers it a standout in the small but growing field of Jewish fantasy. In The Bulletin of the Center for Children's Books, April Spisak describes Alter as a "sympathetic and compelling protagonist". An NPR review by Caitlin Paxson highlights how the darkness of the story (such as the emotional scars of the characters) "makes it all the more moving".

== Awards and nominations ==
The City Beautiful won the young adult category of the Sydney Taylor Book Award. It was a finalist in the World Fantasy Award—Novel, and in the young adult categories for the National Jewish Book Award and the Lambda Literary Award. The City Beautiful was also a finalist for the Cybils Award and nominated for the South Carolina YA Book Award.

== Publication history ==
The City Beautiful has been translated into Spanish, and has been recorded as an English audiobook narrated by Maxwell Glick.

== Sequel ==
In June 2022, Polydoros announced that a sequel to The City Beautiful—told from Frankie's point of view and set in 1894—was set to be published in the autumn of 2024. In December 2025, Polydoros provided an updated publication date of August 2026. The sequel, titled The City of Slaughter, follows Frankie and Alter as they investigate a boy's disappearance.
