= 111th Ohio Infantry Regiment =

Union Army infantry regiment in the American Civil War

- Active: September 5, 1862, to June 27, 1865
- Country: United States
- Allegiance: Union
- Branch: Infantry
- Engagements: Knoxville Campaign; Atlanta campaign; Battle of Rocky Face Ridge; Battle of Resaca; Battle of Dallas; Battle of New Hope Church; Battle of Allatoona; Battle of Kennesaw Mountain; Siege of Atlanta; Battle of Jonesboro; Franklin-Nashville Campaign; Battle of Franklin; Battle of Nashville; Carolinas campaign

The 111th Ohio Infantry Regiment, sometimes 111th Ohio Volunteer Infantry (or 111th OVI) was an infantry regiment in the Union Army during the American Civil War.

== Service ==
The 111th Ohio Infantry was organized in Toledo, Ohio, and mustered in September 5, 1862, for three years service under the command of Colonel John R. Bond.

The regiment was attached to 38th Brigade, 12th Division, Army of the Ohio, September to November 1862. District of Western Kentucky, Department of the Ohio, to May 1863. 1st Brigade, 3rd Division, XXIII Corps, Army of the Ohio, to August 1863. 2nd Brigade, 2nd Division, XXIII Corps, Army of the Ohio, to February 1865, and Department of North Carolina to June 1865.

The 111th Ohio Infantry mustered out of service June 27, 1865, at Salisbury, North Carolina.

== Detailed service ==
Moved to Covington, Ky., September 12. Duty at Covington, September 13–25, 1862. Reconnaissance to Crittenden September 18–20. Moved to Louisville, Ky., September 25. Pursuit of Bragg to Crab Orchard, Ky., October 1–15. Moved to Bowling Green, Ky., October 16, and duty there guarding railroad to Nashville, Tenn., until May 29, 1863. Skirmish at Negro Head Cut, near Woodburn's, April 27. Moved to Glasgow, Ky., May 29, and duty there until June 18. Pursuit of Morgan June 18-July 26. Burnside's Campaign in eastern Tennessee August 16-October 17. At Loudon, Tenn., September 4 to November 14. Knoxville Campaign November 4-December 23. Action at Ruff's Ferry November 14. Near Loudon and Lenoir November 15. Campbell's Station November 16. Siege of Knoxville November 17-December 5. Pursuit of Longstreet to Blain's Cross Roads December 5–16. Operations about Dandridge January 16–17, 1864. Expedition to Flat Creek February 1. Near Knoxville February 13. At Mossy Creek until April 26. Atlanta Campaign May 1 to September 8. Demonstrations on Rocky Faced Ridge and Dalton May 8–13. Battle of Resaca May 14–15. Advance on Dallas May 18–25. Operations on line of Pumpkin Vine Creek and battles about Dallas, New Hope Church, and Allatoona Hills May 25-June 5. Ackworth June 2. Operations about Marietta and against Kennesaw Mountain June 10-July 2. Lost Mountain June 15–17. Muddy Creek June 17. Noyes Creek June 19. Kolb's Farm June 22. Assault on Kennesaw June 27. Nickajack Creek July 2–5. Chattahoochie River July 5–17. Decatur July 19. Howard House July 20. Siege of Atlanta July 22-August 25. Utoy Creek August 5–7. Flank movement on Jonesboro August 25–30. Battle of Jonesboro August 31-September 1. Lovejoy's Station September 2–6. At Decatur September 8 to October 4. Operations against Hood in northern Georgia and northern Alabama October 4–26. At Johnsonville until November 20. Nashville Campaign November–December. Columbia, Duck River, November 24–27. Columbia Ford November 28–29. Battle of Franklin November 30. Battle of Nashville December 15–16. Pursuit of Hood to the Tennessee River December 17–28. At Clifton, Tenn., until January 7, 1865. Movement to Washington, D.C., then to Fort Fisher, N.C., January 7-February 9. Operations against Hoke February 11–14. Fort Anderson February 18–19. Town Creek February 19–20. Capture of Wilmington February 22. Campaign of the Carolinas March 1-April 26. Advance on Goldsboro March 6–21. Occupation of Goldsboro March 21. Advance on Raleigh April 10–14. Occupation of Raleigh April 14. Bennett's House April 26. Surrender of Johnston and his army. Duty at Salisbury, N.C., until June.

== Casualties ==
The regiment lost a total of 215 men during service; 2 officers and 52 enlisted men killed or mortally wounded, 3 officers and 158 enlisted men died of disease.

== Commanders ==
- Colonel John R. Bond
- Lieutenant Colonel Isaac Ruth Sherwood - commanded at the battle of Nashville

== Notable members ==
- Lieutenant Colonel Isaac Ruth Sherwood - U.S. Representative from Ohio, 1873–1875, 1907–1921, 1923–1925

George w Crowell Enlisted Aug 22 1862,

== See also ==
- List of Ohio Civil War units
- Ohio in the Civil War
