= John B. Rice =

American politician

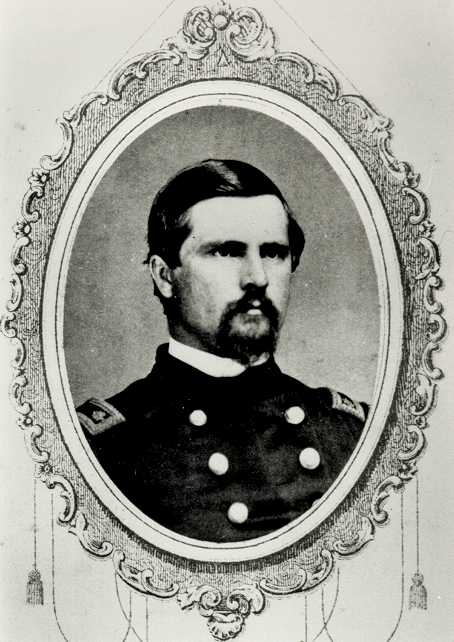

Member of the U.S. House of Representatives from Ohio's 10th district
- In office March 4, 1881 – March 3, 1883
- Preceded by: Thomas Ewing, Jr.
- Succeeded by: Frank H. Hurd

Personal details
- Born: John Birchard Rice; June 23, 1832 Lower Sandusky, Ohio, U.S.
- Died: January 14, 1893 (aged 60) Fremont, Ohio, U.S.
- Resting place: Oakwood Cemetery
- Party: Republican
- Spouse: Sarah Wilson
- Children: two
- Education: Oberlin College; University of Michigan Medical School; Jefferson Medical College
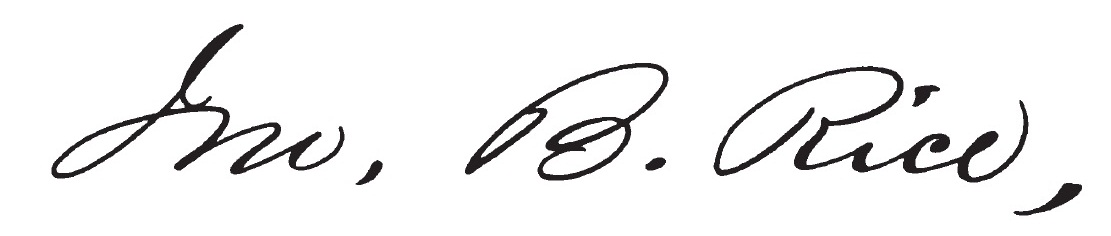
- Signature

Military service
- Allegiance: United States
- Branch/service: Union Army
- Years of service: 1861–1864
- Rank: surgeon
- Unit: 10th Ohio Infantry; 72nd Ohio Infantry; Fifteenth Army Corps
- Battles/wars: American Civil War

John Birchard Rice (June 23, 1832 – January 14, 1893) was an American medical doctor and politician who served as a U.S. representative from Ohio for one term from 1881 to 1883.

== Biography ==
Born in Fremont, Ohio, Rice attended the common schools of Lower Sandusky (now Fremont) and Oberlin College, Ohio. He graduated from the medical department of the University of Michigan at Ann Arbor in 1857. He took a post-graduate course at Jefferson Medical College, Philadelphia, Pennsylvania, and at Bellevue Hospital, New York City in 1859. He was a lecturer on military surgery and obstetrics in the Charity Hospital Medical College and the medical department of the University of Wooster in Cleveland, Ohio.

=== Civil War ===
Rice served on the medical staff during the Civil War as assistant surgeon of the Tenth and then as surgeon of the Seventy-second regiments of the Ohio Volunteer Infantry. He was also surgeon in chief of a division in the Fifteenth Army Corps and of the District of Memphis.

=== After the war ===
After the war, he was appointed a trustee of the state hospital in Toledo, Ohio. He served as member of the Board of Health of Fremont, Ohio.

=== Congress ===
Rice was elected as a Republican to the Forty-seventh Congress (March 4, 1881 – March 3, 1883). He was not a candidate for renomination in 1882. He engaged in the practice of medicine in Fremont.

== Death and burial ==
He died in Fremont, and was interred in Oakwood Cemetery. He died from Bright's disease.

== Family ==
Rice was the second son of Dr. Robert Stuart Rice and Eliza Ann (Caldwell) Rice. He was married to Sarah Wilson on December 12, 1861. They had two children named Lizzie, born 1865, and Wilson, born 1875.

== Sources ==
- United States Congress. "John B. Rice (id: R000199)". Biographical Directory of the United States Congress. Retrieved on 2009-5-12
