= George Rex (politician) =

American judge

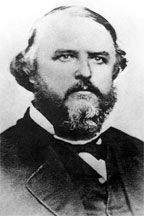

Associate Justice of the Ohio Supreme Court
- In office September 11, 1874 – February 9, 1877
- Appointed by: William Allen
- Preceded by: Walter F. Stone
- Succeeded by: Washington W. Boynton

Member of the Ohio Senate from the 28th district
- In office January 5, 1852 – January 1, 1854
- Preceded by: George W. Bull
- Succeeded by: James Hockinberry

Member of the Ohio Senate from the 17th & 28th district
- In office January 6, 1868 – January 2, 1870
- Preceded by: Frank H. Hurd
- Succeeded by: Hinchman S. Prophet

Personal details
- Born: July 25, 1817 Canton, Ohio
- Died: March 27, 1879 (aged 61) Wooster, Ohio
- Resting place: Wooster Cemetery, Wooster, Ohio
- Party: Democratic
- Spouse: Ella J. McCurdy
- Children: one daughter
- Education: Capital University

George Rex (July 25, 1817 – March 27, 1879) was a Democratic politician in Wooster in the U.S. State of Ohio who was in the Ohio Senate and was an Ohio Supreme Court Judge 1874–1877.

== Biography ==
George Rex was born in Canton, Ohio to Jacob and Catherine Rex, members of the Methodist Church who emigrated from Cumberland County, Pennsylvania and settled in Canton in 1815. As a boy, he attended the Lutheran Seminary in Canton for one and one half years, when that school moved to Columbus, Ohio and became Capital University. He studied there for two more years, and returned home the winter of 1833–1834 without graduating. He taught school in Canton, studied law, and was admitted to the bar October 10, 1842.

Rex moved to Wooster, Ohio February 9, 1843, where he practiced law. He was elected Prosecuting Attorney of Wayne County in 1847 and re-elected in 1849. He was elected to represent the 28th district in the Ohio Senate in 1851, and served in the 50th General Assembly in 1852 and 1853. In 1859 and 1861, he was again elected Prosecuting Attorney of Wayne County, and appointed to fill a vacancy in that position in 1864. In 1867, he again was elected to the Ohio Senate for the 58th General Assembly of 1868–1869.

On September 11, 1874, Governor Allen appointed Rex to the Ohio Supreme Court, to fill a vacancy when Walter F. Stone resigned. He ran for the remainder of the term that autumn, and defeated Republican William Wartenbee Johnson. His term on the bench expired February 9, 1877. Rex refused re-nomination in the fall of 1876, and returned to Wooster and his private practice.

Rex was married to Ella J. McCurdy of Wooster on May 24, 1853. They raised one child, a daughter. Rex was a Freemason. He was a member of the Ebenezer Lodge and the Wooster Chapter of the Ancient Order of Freemasonry. As a Freemason, he served the Grand Lodge of Ohio as Grand Master in 1861 and 1862.

George Rex died at Wooster on March 27, 1879, or March 26. He was buried at Kime's Corner Cemetery, a family cemetery in Congress Township, Wayne County, Ohio. Another source says he was buried at Wooster Cemetery, section 9, lot 252, with Masonic honors.

== Notes ==
Legal offices
Preceded by Walter F. Stone	Associate Justice of the Ohio Supreme Court; 1874–1877	Succeeded by Washington W. Boynton
Ohio Senate
Preceded by George W. Bull	Senator from 28th District; 1852–1853	Succeeded by James Hockinberry
Preceded by Frank Hunt Hurd	Senator from 17th and 28th Districts; 1868–1869	Succeeded by Hinchman S. Prophet
