= Harry W. Kessler =

American politician (1927–2007)

54th Mayor of Toledo, Ohio
- In office January 27, 1971 – December 1, 1977
- Preceded by: William J. Ensign
- Succeeded by: Douglas DeGood

Personal details
- Born: August 15, 1927
- Died: January 2, 2007 (aged 79)
- Party: Democratic
- Profession: Politician

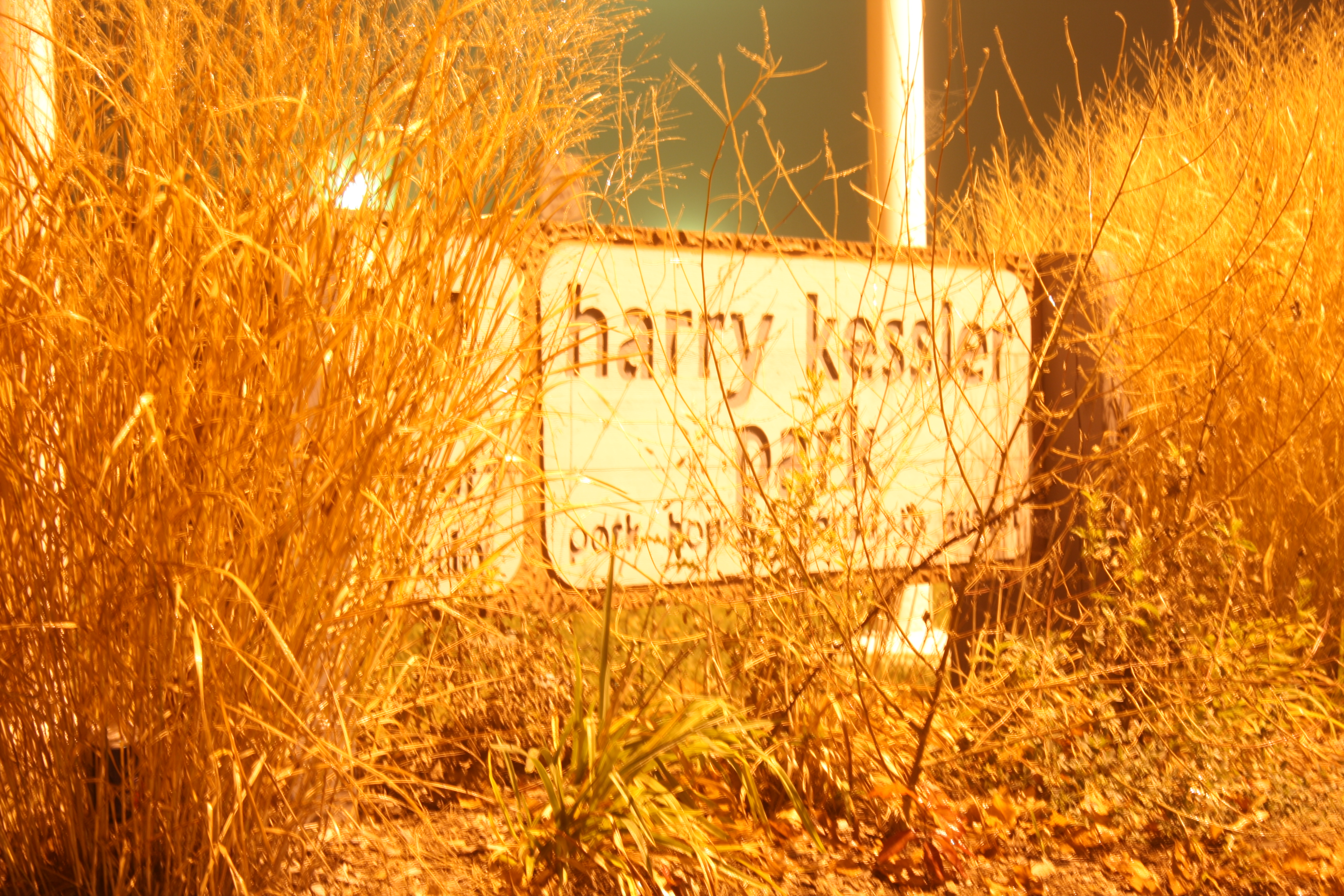
Harry Kessler Park signage

Harry W. Kessler (August 15, 1927 – January 2, 2007) was a Democratic politician who served as the Mayor of the City of Toledo, Ohio from January 27, 1971, until December 1, 1977.

- 1965–1969: Toledo City Councilman
- 1969–1970: Toledo Vice Mayor
- 1971–1977: Toledo Mayor
- 1978–1991: Toledo Municipal Court Clerk of Courts

He also served as President of the Toledo Lucas County Visitors & Convention Bureau, and a board member of the Toledo Public Schools and the Toledo-Lucas County Public Library.
