= Ebenezer Lane =

American judge

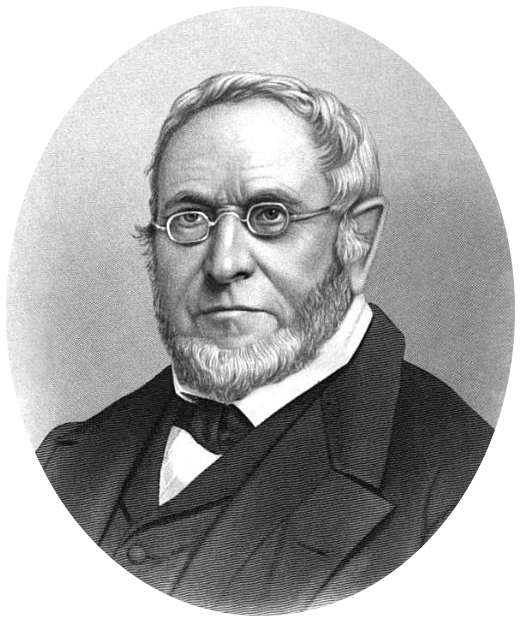

Justice of the Ohio Supreme Court
- In office December 31, 1830 – February 16, 1845
- Preceded by: Elijah Hayward
- Succeeded by: Peter Hitchcock

Personal details
- Born: September 17, 1793 Northampton, Massachusetts
- Died: June 12, 1866 (aged 72) Sandusky, Ohio
- Resting place: Oakland Cemetery, Sandusky
- Spouse: Frances Ann Griswold
- Children: three
- Education: Harvard University
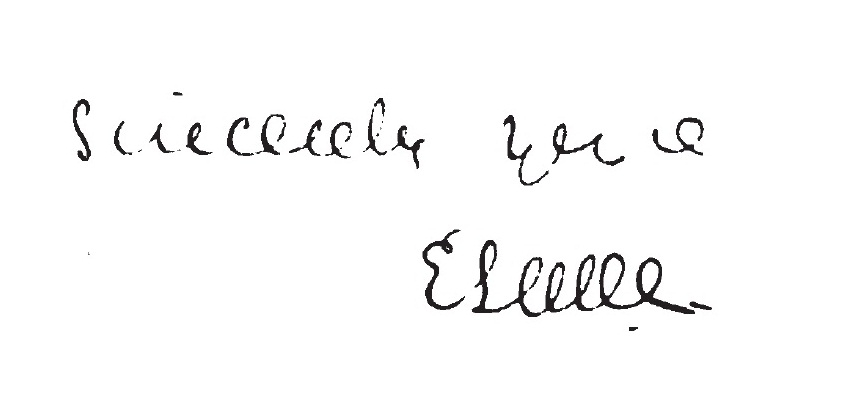
- Signature

Ebenezer Lane (1793-1866) was a lawyer from the U.S. State of Ohio who served on the Ohio Supreme Court 1830 to 1845. From 1840 until his retirement, he was Chief Justice.

== Youth ==
Lane was born September 17, 1793, at Northampton, Massachusetts. His father was Captain Ebenezer Lane, a seaman and later a farmer, and his mother was Marian Griswold Chandler Lane, daughter of Matthew Griswold, Governor of Connecticut, and first married to Charles E. Chandler, before marrying Capt. Ebenezer Lane. He enrolled in a boarding school at Leicester, Worcester County, Massachusetts, at age eight and at Harvard University at age fourteen, graduating in 1811. Harvard awarded him an honorary Doctor of Law in 1850. He studied law at Lyme, Connecticut, under his uncle, Judge Matthew Griswold, and was admitted to the bar in 1814. He practiced at Norwalk, Connecticut, beginning Sept. 14, 1814 and moved to Windsor Hill, Connecticut, in 1815 to practice. He was named a notary public for Hartford County, Connecticut, by Governor John Cotton Smith on May 21, 1816.

== Move to Ohio ==
On February 20, 1817, Lane left New England with his step-brother, Herman Ely. They travelled by wagon and arrived in Ohio, where Ely owned 10, 423 acres at the future site of Elyria, Ohio, on March 17. He purchased a farm in Elyria, and walked back to New England in twenty days in October and November 1817. He returned by stage to Ohio in February, 1818, and returned to Connecticut by October 1, 1818. He was married October 11, 1818, to Frances Ann Griswold of Lyme, Connecticut, daughter of Roger Griswold, former Governor. The new couple moved immediately to their farm in Elyria.

== Public service ==
In May, 1819, Lane was elected prosecuting attorney for Huron County, Ohio, and the family moved to Norwalk, Ohio, the county seat, in October, 1819. On February 17, 1824, the Ohio General Assembly elected Lane president judge of the second judicial circuit for a seven-year term, requiring him to travel to courthouses in each county of his circuit to preside. The General Assembly elected Lane to a seat on the Ohio Supreme Court on December 18, 1830, for a seven-year term. He received his commission from Ohio Governor Duncan McArthur on December 31, 1830. He was elected to two more terms, but tendered his resignation to Governor Thomas W. Bartley on December 20, 1844, with an effective date of February 16, 1845. He was Chief Justice from 1840 to 1845.

== Railroad career ==
In July, 1842, Lane sold his home in Norwalk, and moved to Sandusky, Ohio, which was his home for the remainder of his life. After retiring from the court, he partnered with his son, William G. Lane and Walter F. Stone in that place in a law practice. He was president of the Columbus and Lake Erie Railroad, Mad River and Lake Erie Railroad and the Junction Railroad.

In November 1855, Lane was elected Counsel and Resident Director of the Illinois Central Railroad, and removed to Chicago, staying in that office until March 16, 1859.

== Retirement ==
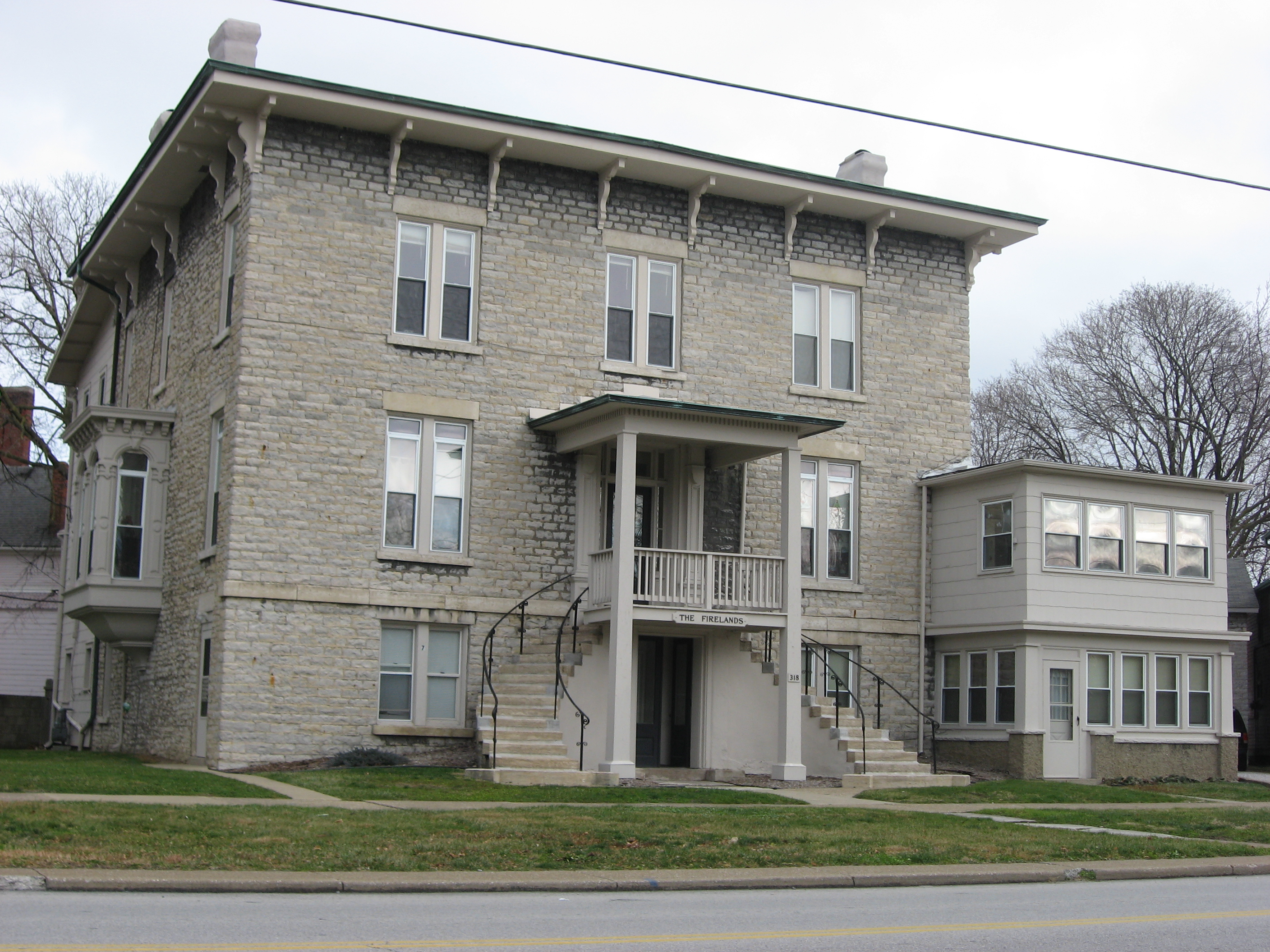
Lane's Sandusky home

On March 23, 1859, Lane embarked at Boston, Massachusetts, on the steamer Arabia, bound for Liverpool, England. He toured London, Paris, Brussels, Antwerp, Rotterdam, and Amsterdam. Next he went to Berlin, Prague, Dresden, Leipzig, Nuremberg, Frankfort, Cologne, Switzerland, and Italy. He returned to New York, from London, arriving after more than a year away on April 27, 1860. He visited libraries and museums throughout the trip.

Lane devoted his remaining years at Sandusky to studies in his personal library of 4000 books, in the English, French and German languages. Upon his death, this collection was passed to his son, Dr. Ebenezer S. Lane, Jr. of Chicago. It was the only library collection within the city to survive the Great Chicago Fire of 1871. Lane's grandchildren donated the collection to the University of Chicago

== Personal ==
Lane and his wife had three children, Dr. Ebenezer S. Lane, of Chicago, Frances Elizabeth, wife of Alfred Cheseborough of Detroit, and William Griswold Lane, lawyer and judge from Sandusky, who married Elizabeth Griswold of Lyme, Connecticut in 1850. He was a member of the Episcopal Church. The New England Historic Genealogical Society elected him a member in 1856, and he was a member of the New York Historical Society, Ohio Historical Society and Chicago Historical Society. He died at Sandusky on June 12, 1866, and his funeral was at his home on June 14. He is interred at Oakland Cemetery in Sandusky.

== Reputation ==
He was one of the many able men who have sat on the Supreme Court of Ohio. He had penetrating sagacity and rare intellectual powers, was profoundly versed in the law, and was an omnivorous reader of literature. On the bench he shunned display of learning, and was for the most part content with stating the facts and principles of law which controlled the case; and his opinions, concise, direct, and cogent are conspicuous in the reports for their simplicity and strength.

— Carrington T. Marshall

He came to the Bar when the jurisprudence of Ohio was yet not settled, and brought to its cultivation great general ability, patient research, both in civil and common law and logical power and acumen. His thorough knowledge of the civil law and his varied and extensive and accurate historical learning, qualified him to compare the systems of our several states and of other countries and to educe the great principles which lie at the foundations of all systems of jurisprudence. Ohio will never fully understand how much she is indebted to Judge Lane and those like him, who, before and with him, wrought at the foundation of our social security and general happiness and progress as a State.

— C.L. Latimer

== Lane Seminary ==
The Lane Theological Seminary, a Presbyterian institution in Walnut Hills, Cincinnati was endowed in 1829 by a different person named Ebenezer Lane, a Baptist from New Orleans, Louisiana. The subject of this article was not connected with this institution.
