= The Whitechapel Club =

The Whitechapel Club was started in 1889 by a small group of newspapermen in Chicago, Illinois. The club was named after the area in London where Jack the Ripper murdered his victims. It only lasted five years, ending in 1894.

While the core of the club members were newspapermen, the club members included artists, musicians, physicians and lawyers. Some of the well known members of the club included Brand Whitlock, George Ade, and Finley Peter Dunne.

Inside, the Whitechapel Club looked more like a trophy room for murderers rather than club house. Walls were decorated with Indian blankets soaked with blood, nooses, knives that had been used to kill, and pictures of pirates who had been beheaded. Skulls, used to drink red fruit juice, lay everywhere, and a full-size model of their "President," Jack the Ripper, was placed in a corner. Pipes, cigars, and alcohol would be easily found in any room as well.

Meetings at the Whitechapel Club would usually start around midnight. Because Jack the Ripper was never in attendance, meetings would be chaired by the Vice-President. Club meetings were very private, although guests very occasionally were brought. During meetings, people would tell stories, jokes, poems, or monologues. It was customary to yell insults at whoever rose to speak to the club. Throughout the meetings, members would drink heavily.

In later years of the club's existence, membership became very coveted. In order to become a member a candidate had to go through an initiation. First, only two members of any profession could belong to the club at any time. The new member, known as a probationary member, would go to club meetings for one month. At any time during that month, another member could reject him from becoming a member. If the first month was survived a club-wide vote would be made whether to keep or reject the man. If one vote was a “No” he would not get membership to the club. Brand Whitlock, at the time the political correspondent for the Chicago Herald, remembered that a candidate was required to come to meetings five nights a week for a month while his name was pinned to a bulletin board; any member who disagreed with the potential membership could just take the name down.

Whitlock recalled the fate of the Whitechapel Club: "But the prosperity and the fame of the club led to its end. Rich and important men of Chicago sought membership. Some were admitted, then more, and as a result the club lost its Bohemian character, and finally disbanded."
