= Brand Whitlock =

American politician and diplomat

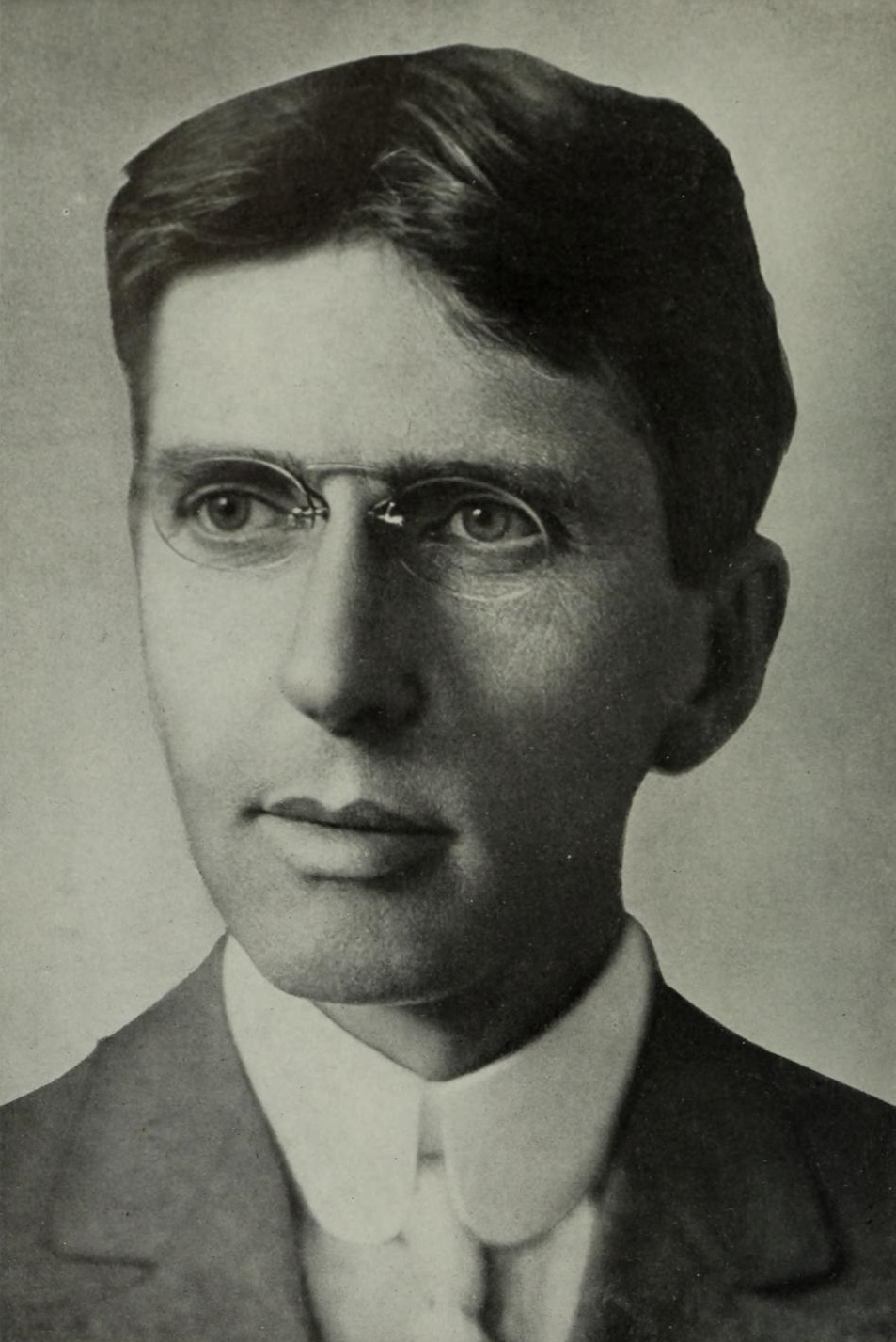

United States Ambassador to Belgium
- In office May 1, 1919 – July 20, 1921
- President: Woodrow Wilson
- Preceded by: New office
- Succeeded by: Henry P. Fletcher

34th Mayor of Toledo
- In office June 6, 1906 – April 9, 1914
- Preceded by: Robert H. Finch
- Succeeded by: Carl H. Keller

Personal details
- Born: Joseph Brand Whitlock; March 4, 1869 Urbana, Ohio, U.S.
- Died: May 24, 1934 (aged 65) Cannes, France
- Party: Democratic
- Spouse(s): Susan Brainerd (m. 1894; d. 1910); Ella Brainerd (m. 1915)
- Children: 3
- Profession: Attorney; journalist; politician

Brand Whitlock (March 4, 1869 – May 24, 1934) was an American journalist, attorney, politician, Georgist, four-time mayor of Toledo, Ohio, elected on the Independent ticket; ambassador to Belgium, and author of numerous articles and books, both novels and non-fiction.

== Journalist ==
Born Joseph Brand Whitlock in Urbana, Ohio, son of the Rev. Elias and Mollie Lavinia (Brand) Whitlock, he was educated in the public schools and by private tutors. Rather than attend college, Whitlock began working as a reporter for several papers in Toledo, Ohio, including The Toledo Blade.

In 1891, he moved to Chicago to work for The Chicago Herald. He covered baseball, including longtime Chicago captain-manager Cap Anson, whom he sometimes referred to in print as "Grampa." He also covered the 1892 Republican National Convention and the 1892 Illinois legislative session. Whitlock joined the Whitechapel Club.

== Springfield, Illinois ==
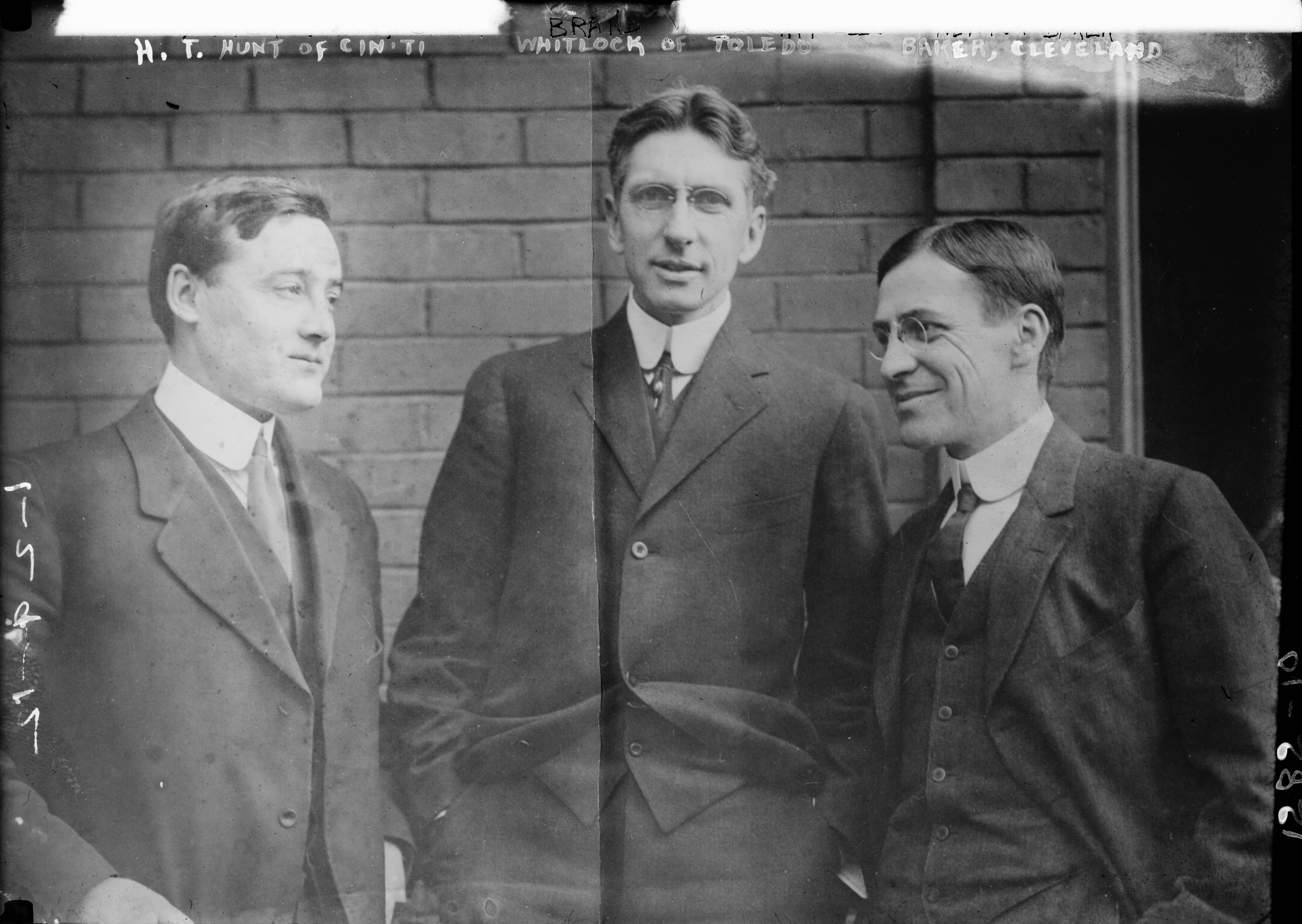
The Holy Trinity, as Ohio mayors (L-R) Henry Thomas Hunt of Cincinnati, Brand Whitlock of Toledo, and Newton D. Baker of Cleveland were called following the mayoral elections of November 4, 1911.

His political writing attracted attention by Illinois politicians, and Whitlock was offered a job as Gov. John Peter Altgeld's personal secretary; instead he took a position with the Secretary of State. While in Springfield, he also studied the law under Senator J. M. Palmer; he was admitted to the bar in 1894, at the age of 25.

Whitlock had married Susan Brainerd in 1892, but she died four months after their wedding. In 1895 he married again, choosing her sister Nell Brainerd.

In 1893, Whitlock prepared the pardon documents for the Haymarket Affair's convicted men: Fielden, Neebe, and Schwab. After Gov. Altgeld signed the pardons, Whitlock commented, "The storm will break now," to which the governor replied, "It was merely doing right."

Whitlock became very active in Illinois Democratic Party politics. In 1894, he was Chair of the Democratic Finance Committee and in charge of arrangements for the state convention.

== Attorney and mayor of Toledo, Ohio ==
After the defeat of Gov. Altgeld in 1896, Whitlock returned to Toledo in 1897, where he established a successful legal practice. Whitlock provided legal services to the Mayor of Toledo, Samuel M. Jones, a.k.a. "Golden Rule" Jones. In one case, Whitlock successfully argued to overturn the Ohio state statutes that governed municipalities.

Whitlock entered politics more directly in Toledo, running on the Independent ticket for mayor; he was elected four times from 1906 to 1914. He was one of a number of Progressive politicians elected as mayors of major Midwestern cities in 1911, following the unexpected sweep of the Milwaukee Socialists in 1910. He declined a fifth nomination as mayor when recruited for a diplomatic post.

== Ambassador to Belgium ==
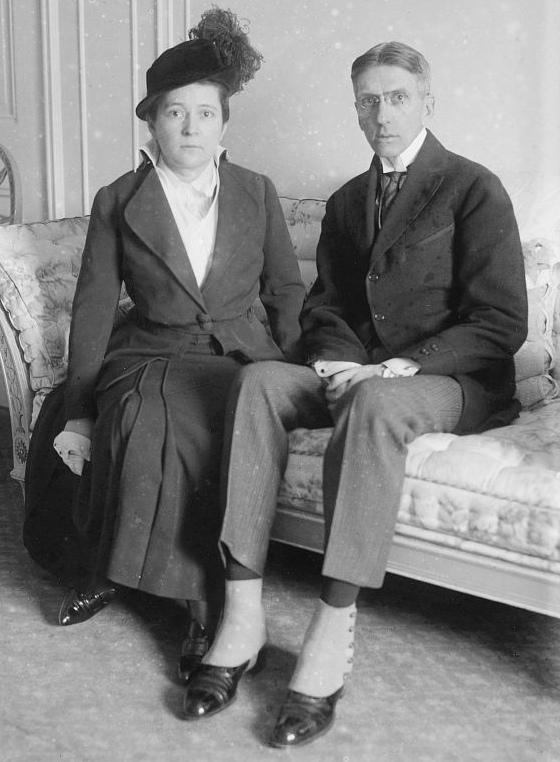
Brand Whitlock and his wife in New York City in 1915

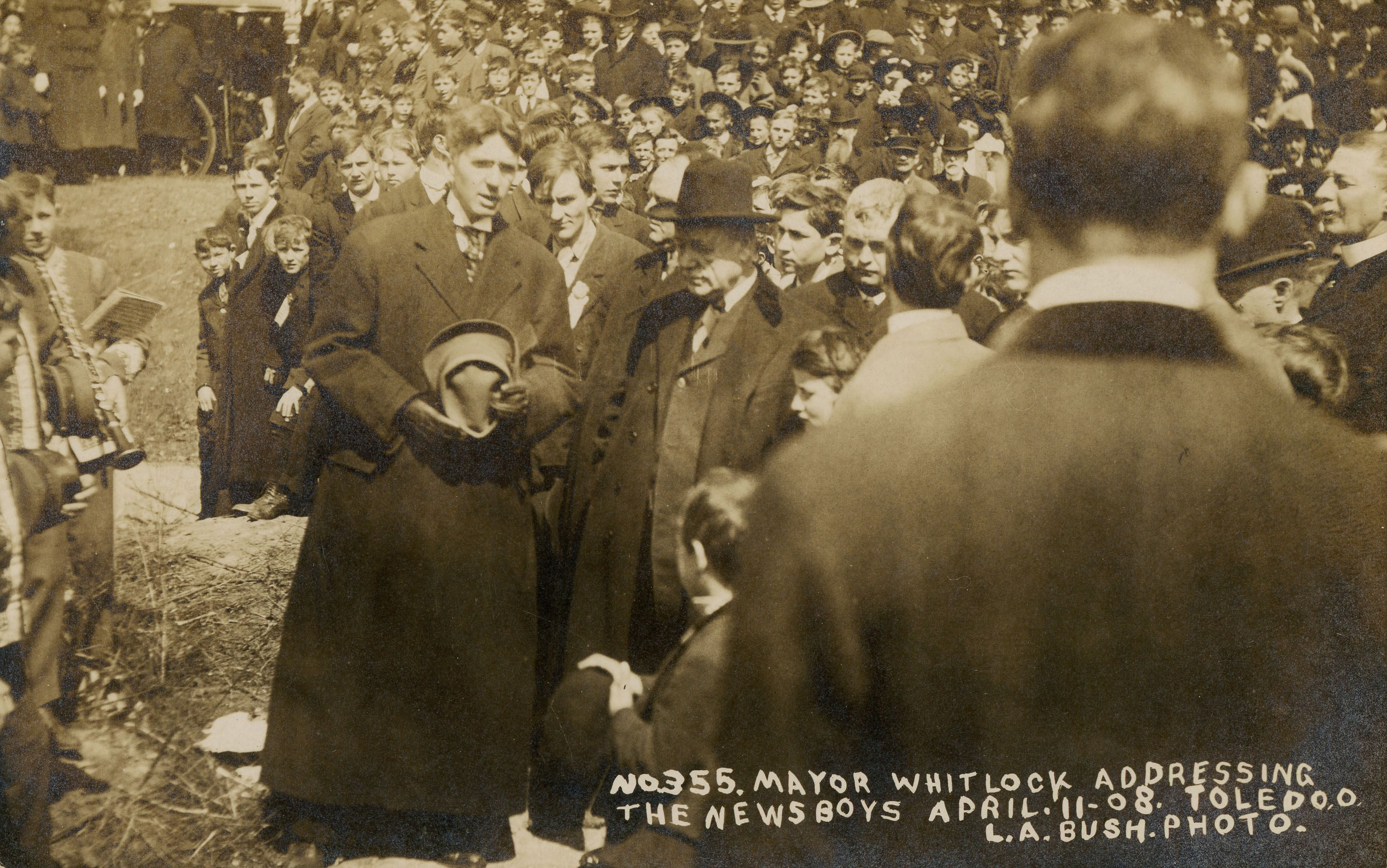
Mayor Brand Whitlock, Newsboys' Building Site Ground Breaking Ceremony, 1908, Toledo, Ohio

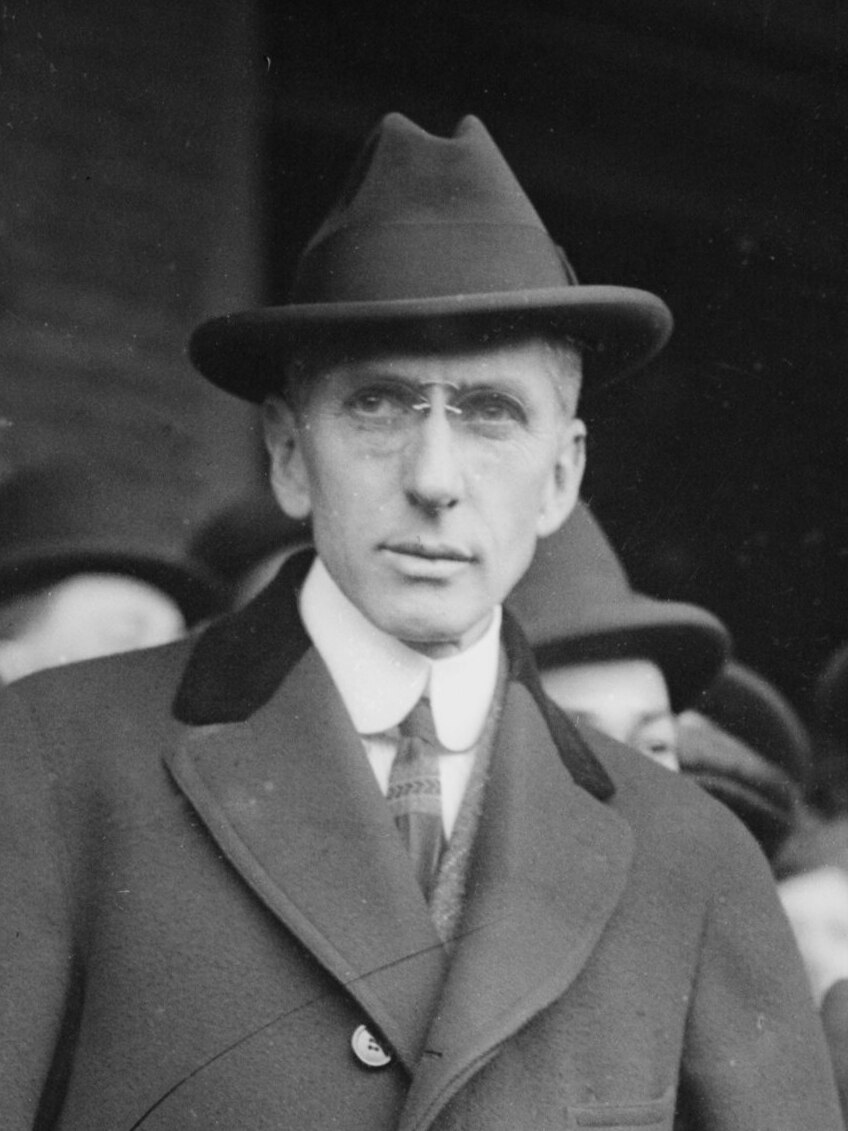
Brand Whitlock in the 1910s

After finishing his last term as mayor, in 1913 Whitlock was appointed minister to Belgium by President Wilson. Whitlock originally accepted the diplomatic post in Belgium under the impression that it would be a quiet sinecure, providing him ample leisure time to write novels. When the First World War broke out, his responsibilities were increased as he was given representation for seven additional countries in wartime. His position was extremely sensitive after the German occupation of Belgium. His adroit performance of his duties in the office won him an international reputation for tact, zeal, and efficiency. Whitlock ensured food aid sent by the Committee for Relief in Belgium went to Belgian citizens rather than the German occupation forces.

With the United States' declaration of war against Germany in April 1917, Whitlock needed to leave Belgium. He insisted on ensuring he accompanied other Americans out of Belgium, and crossed into Switzerland, which was neutral. During the war, he visited King Albert of Belgium at the Allied battle front.

After the signing of the armistice in November 1918 and the restoration of the Belgian government, Whitlock returned to Brussels as minister. In 1919, he went to the United States for a visit. While he was at home, the United States' representation in Belgium was raised to rank of an embassy, and Whitlock became an ambassador.

== Writings ==
Whitlock wrote numerous newspaper articles, short stories, novels, essays, biographies, non-fiction and memoirs. His novels dealt with political and social issues. The anarchist activist Emma Goldman described Whitlock's novel The Turn of the Balance as "the greatest American exposé of crime in the making" and argued that its characters demonstrate "how the legal aspects of crime, and the methods of dealing with it, help to create the disease which is undermining our entire social life."

Non-fiction

- (1908). Abraham Lincoln.
- (1910–1913). On the Enforcement of Law in Cities.
- (1914). Forty Years of It.
- (1919). Belgium: a Personal Record [2 vols.]
- (1920). Walt Whitman: How to Know Him.
- (1929). Lafayette.
- (1936). The Letters and Journal of Brand Whitlock.

Fiction

- (1902). The Thirteenth District: The Story of a Candidate.
- (1904). The Happy Average.
- (1904). Her Infinite Variety.
- (1907). The Turn of the Balance.
- (1910). The Gold Brick.
- (1912). The Fall Guy.
- (1923). J. Hardin and Son.
- (1926). Uprooted.
- (1927). Transplanted.
- (1928). Big Matt.
- (1931). Narcissus.
- (1931). The Little Green Shutter.
- (1933). The Stranger on the Island.
- (1977). The Buckeyes, edited by Paul W. Miller.

== Represented in popular culture ==
- John F. Kennedy wrote about Altgeld's pardons of men from the Haymarket Affair in his book, Profiles in Courage. In the 1965 television show based on the book, John Kerr played Brand Whitlock.
- The Reluctant Hero: Brand Whitlock was a WBGU-PBS documentary about him.

== Legacy and honors ==
In 1932, Whitlock was appointed as an honorary vice president of the American Friends of Lafayette. For his service to Belgium, Whitlock received numerous honors, including the Order of Leopold knighthood. He was an early member of the American Academy of Arts and Letters. A boulevard in Brussels was named for him in the Woluwe-Saint-Lambert municipality.

== See also ==
- List of elected socialist mayors in the United States

== Notes ==
Diplomatic posts
Preceded by post created	United States Ambassador to Belgium; 1919–1921	Succeeded by Henry P. Fletcher
