= William W. Jones =

19th-century mayor of Toledo, Ohio

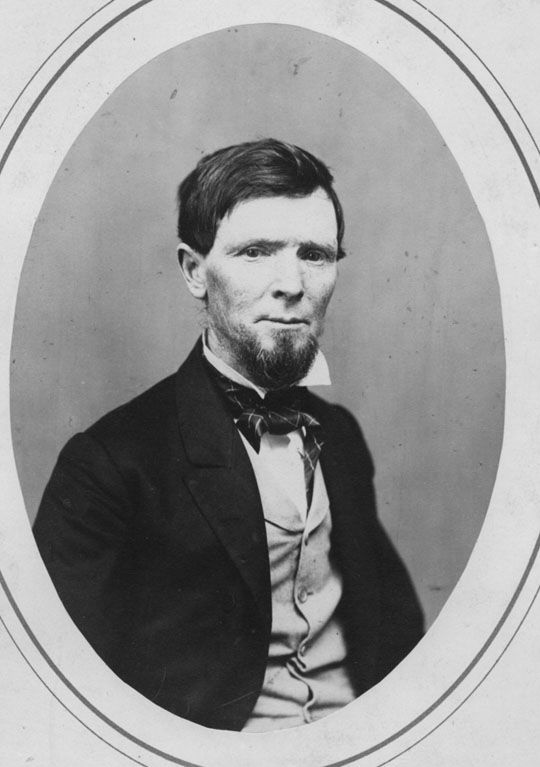
William W. Jones

William W. Jones was the mayor of Toledo, Ohio, from 1871 to 1875 and again from 1877 to 1879.
