= Martin A. Janis =

American politician

Director of the Ohio Department of Mental Hygiene and Correction
- In office 1963–1984
- Governor: James A. Rhodes

Personal details
- Born: July 22, 1913 Toledo, Ohio
- Died: June 23, 2005 (aged 91) Sandusky, Ohio
- Spouse: Anne M. Janis
- Known for: creating Administration on Aging (1965); Golden Buckeye program (1978)
- Nickname: Mr. Aging

Martin A. Janis (July 22, 1913 – June 23, 2005), frequently referred to as "Mr. Aging", was an American politician and gerontologist.

Born in Toledo, Ohio, Janis was the youngest of four brothers. He was elected, as a Republican, to the Ohio House of Representatives in 1960 and served one term. In 1962 he ran for a Congressional seat in Ohio's 9th district which he lost to Thomas W.L. Ashley.

In 1963, Ohio Governor James A. Rhodes appointed Janis Director of the Ohio Department of Mental Hygiene and Correction. He was the first layperson in the United States to hold such a position. During the course of his appointment he created the Administration on Aging in 1965 which was Ohio's first official program devoted to its elder citizens.

In January 1977, Caspar Weinberger appointed Janis to the Advisory Council of the National Institute on Aging. In 1979, the Ohio Commission on Aging named the state's first multipurpose senior center after Janis. In 1981, he headed Ohio's delegation to the White House Conference on Aging, where he served as chairman of one of the fourteen workshops that comprised that conference.

As Director of the Ohio Department of Aging, Janis was responsible for the creation of the "Golden Buckeye" card in 1978. The card offered discounts to senior citizens and is currently honored at over 20,000 businesses in the state of Ohio. In 1988, Janis authored The Joys of Aging, an instructive guide to growing old gracefully.

Janis died on June 23, 2005, in Sandusky, Ohio, where he was living with his wife, Anne M. Janis, and daughter, Marlana A. Janis. Martin had a grandson Martin A. Janis and two great-granddaughters Naya Janis and Montana Janis.

== Bibliography ==
- The Joys of Aging. Dallas, Texas: Word Pub. 1988. ISBN 0-8499-0663-6.
