= John F. Hunter =

American politician

Member of the U.S. House of Representatives from Ohio's 9th district
- In office January 3, 1937 – January 3, 1943
- Preceded by: Warren J. Duffey
- Succeeded by: Homer A. Ramey

Member of the Ohio Senate
- In office 1935-1936

Member of the Ohio House of Representatives
- In office 1933-1934

Personal details
- Born: John Feeney Hunter; October 19, 1896 Ford City, Pennsylvania
- Died: December 19, 1957 (aged 61) Alexandria, Virginia
- Resting place: Calvary Cemetery, Toledo, Ohio
- Party: Democratic

Military service
- Allegiance: United States
- Branch/service: United States Army
- Years of service: 1918
- Battles/wars: World War I

John Feeney Hunter (October 19, 1896 – December 19, 1957) was an American lawyer, soldier, and three-term U.S. Representative from Ohio from 1937 to 1943.

== Early life and career ==
Born in Ford City, Pennsylvania, Hunter moved with his parents in 1907 to Toledo, Ohio, where he attended the public schools. He was graduated from the law department of St. John's University in Toledo in 1918. He was admitted to the bar the same year and commenced practice in the city.

=== World War I ===
During the First World War, he enlisted in the United States Army on March 6, 1918, and served until honorably discharged on November 26, 1918.

=== Early Political Career ===
He served as delegate to the Democratic State conventions in 1932, 1934, 1936, and 1938. Hunter was an alternate to the Democratic National Conventions in 1932 and 1936. He was a member of the State house of representatives in 1933 and 1934 and served in the Ohio State Senate in 1935 and 1936.

== Congress ==
Hunter was elected as a Democrat to the Seventy-fifth, Seventy-sixth, and Seventy-seventh Congresses (January 3, 1937–January 3, 1943). He was an unsuccessful candidate for reelection in 1942 to the Seventy-eighth Congress and for election in 1944 to the Seventy-ninth Congress. He resumed the practice of law in Toledo, Ohio, and Washington, D.C.

== Death ==
He died in Alexandria, Virginia, December 19, 1957, and was interred in Calvary Cemetery in Toledo.

== Electoral history ==
Year	Democratic	Republican	Other
1936	✓ John F. Hunter: 75,737	Raymond E. Hildebrand: 55,043	Earl O. Lehman: 3,739
1938	✓ John F. Hunter (Incumbent): 56,306	Homer A. Ramey: 55,441	(none)
1940	✓ John F. Hunter (Incumbent): 86,956	Wilbur M. White: 71,927	(none)
1942	John F. Hunter (Incumbent): 44,027	✓ Homer A. Ramey: 47,377	(none)
1944	John F. Hunter: 77,693	✓ Homer A. Ramey (Incumbent): 82,735	(none)

== Sources ==
- United States Congress. "John F. Hunter (id: H000983)". Biographical Directory of the United States Congress.

U.S. House of Representatives
Preceded by Warren J. Duffey	Member of the U.S. House of Representatives from Ohio's 9th congressional district January 3, 1937-January 3, 1943	Succeeded by Homer A. Ramey
