= Marcy Kaptur =

American politician (born 1946)

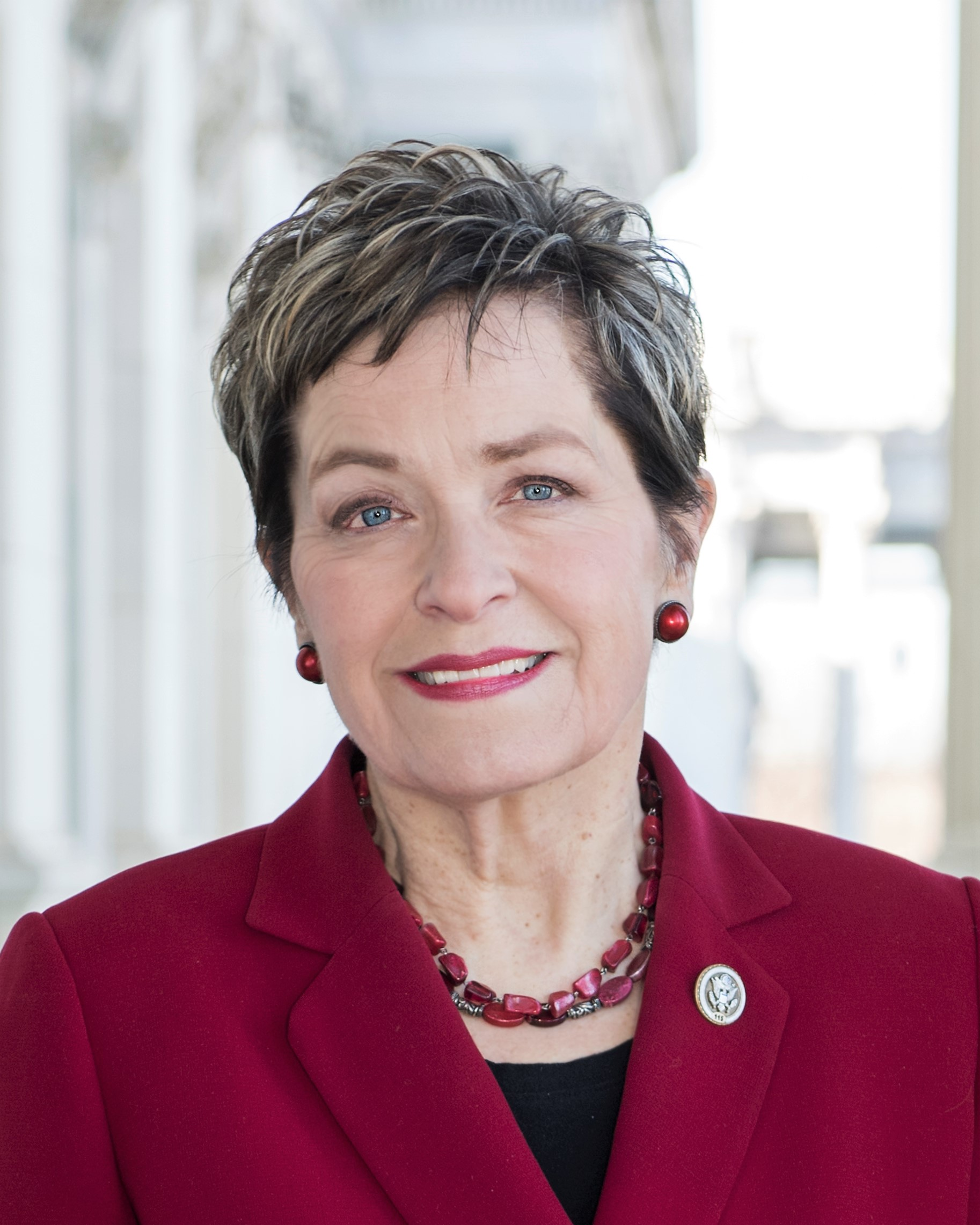
- Official portrait, 2018

Member of the U.S. House of Representatives from Ohio's 9th district
- Incumbent
- Assumed office January 3, 1983
- Preceded by: Ed Weber

Personal details
- Born: Marcia Carolyn Kaptur; June 17, 1946 (age 80) Toledo, Ohio, U.S.
- Party: Democratic
- Education: University of Wisconsin, Madison (BA); University of Michigan (MUP); Massachusetts Institute of Technology (attended)
- Website: House website Campaign website
- Kaptur's voice Kaptur supporting Ukraine following Russia's annexation of Crimea. Recorded September 17, 2014

Marcia Carolyn Kaptur (/ˈkæptər/ KAP-tər; born June 17, 1946) is an American politician serving in her 22nd term as the U.S. representative for Ohio's 9th congressional district, having first been elected in 1983. Her district stretches across northwestern Ohio along the southern shore of Lake Erie and includes parts of Toledo and surrounding communities. She is a member of the Democratic Party.

Born in Toledo, Ohio, Kaptur earned a degree in history from the University of Wisconsin–Madison and a master’s degree in urban planning from the University of Michigan. Before her election to Congress, she worked as an urban planner in Toledo and served as a domestic policy advisor on urban affairs in the Jimmy Carter administration.

Kaptur serves on the House Appropriations and Budget Committees and introduced legislation which established the National World War II Memorial. She is considered an economic populist, having opposed the North American Free Trade Agreement and other free trade agreements, as well as having voted against the federal bailout of major banks during the 2008 financial crisis.

Kaptur was first elected to Congress in 1982. She was most recently re-elected in 2026 with 52.73% of the vote. She is the longest-serving woman in congressional history and has served as the dean of Ohio's congressional delegation since 2009.

== Early life and education ==
Kaptur was born on June 17, 1946, in Toledo, Ohio, to Anastasia Delores (Rogowski) and Stephen Jacob Kaptur. Both of her parents were of Polish descent. Her paternal grandparents came from the town of Żnin in present-day Poland, while her maternal grandparents, the Rogowskis, were from the area of Polonne, now located in Ukraine's Khmelnytskyi Oblast. Her family ran a small grocery store in Rossford, and her mother was an automobile union organizer. Kaptur became involved in politics at an early age, volunteering with the Ohio Democratic Party when she was 13.

She graduated from St. Ursula Academy, an all-girls Catholic preparatory school, in 1964 and was the first person in her family to attend college. She received her undergraduate degree in history from the University of Wisconsin–Madison in 1968 and a Master of Urban Planning from the University of Michigan in 1974. She began doctoral studies in urban planning development finance at the Massachusetts Institute of Technology in 1981.

== Early career ==
Kaptur began her career in urban planning, working as an urban planner on the Toledo-Lucas County Plan Commissions from 1969 to 1975. During this time period, she stayed active in local Democratic politics, volunteering for Hubert Humphrey’s 1968 presidential campaign and later helping George McGovern carry Lucas County in the 1972 presidential election, one of only two counties in Ohio to do so.

In 1975, she became director of planning for the National Center for Urban Ethnic Affairs, a Washington-based organization founded by Catholic priest Geno Baroni, where she worked until 1977. Afterwards, she joined the Carter administration as a domestic policy advisor on urban affairs and helped advance several housing and neighborhood revitalization bills through Congress. Following her time in Washington, D.C., Kaptur went to Massachusetts to do graduate work.

== U.S. House of Representatives ==
=== Elections ===
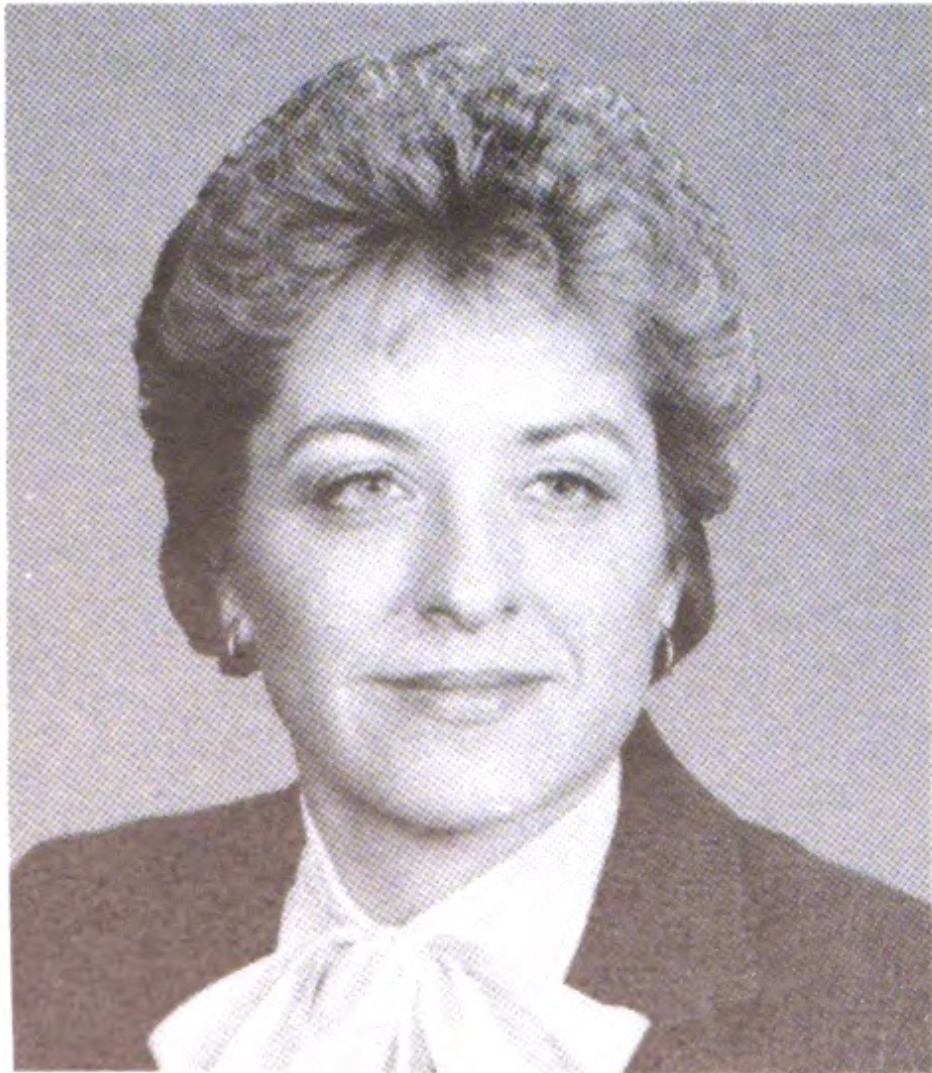
Kaptur's portrait from the 98th Congress, 1983

In 1982, while pursuing her doctorate degree, Kaptur was recruited by local Democratic leaders to run for Congress in Ohio's 9th district in the midterm elections. The seat was held by freshman Republican Ed Weber, who had unseated 26-year incumbent Lud Ashley two years earlier. Initially considered a long shot, Kaptur entered the race after encouragement from Geno Baroni and party officials who had struggled to find a viable challenger.

Kaptur returned to Ohio from Massachusetts, withdrawing from her doctoral program and driving through a snowstorm to begin campaigning. Her campaign gained attention for its grassroots style, including raising $10,000 through bake sales, a strategy that became a hallmark of her early political efforts. Amid a national recession during President Reagan's first term and rising unemployment in Lucas County, Kaptur focused her campaign on local economic decline and criticized Weber's support for the free trade policies of the Reagan Administration. She connected with working-class voters by emphasizing economic populism and cultural familiarity, once serving kielbasa made from her father's recipe at a rally.

Despite receiving little support from the national Democratic Party, which had largely written off the district, Kaptur benefited from encouragement by Representatives Shirley Chisholm and Mary Rose Oakar. Though outspent nearly three to one, she won the election with 58% of the vote. Kaptur later credited her victory to her strong ties to the local community. After the election, she recalled how the Democratic Congressional Campaign Committee, which had provided no support during the race, sent her a belated $5,000 contribution.

In 1984, for her re-election, Kaptur faced a strong challenge from Republican Frank Venner, a longtime news anchor at WTVG, but defeated him 55–44%, even as Ronald Reagan carried the district. From 1986 to 2002, she won every election with at least 74% of the vote. She won her 12th term in 2004 with 68% of the vote, and again secured 74% in both 2006 and 2008.

==== 2010s ====
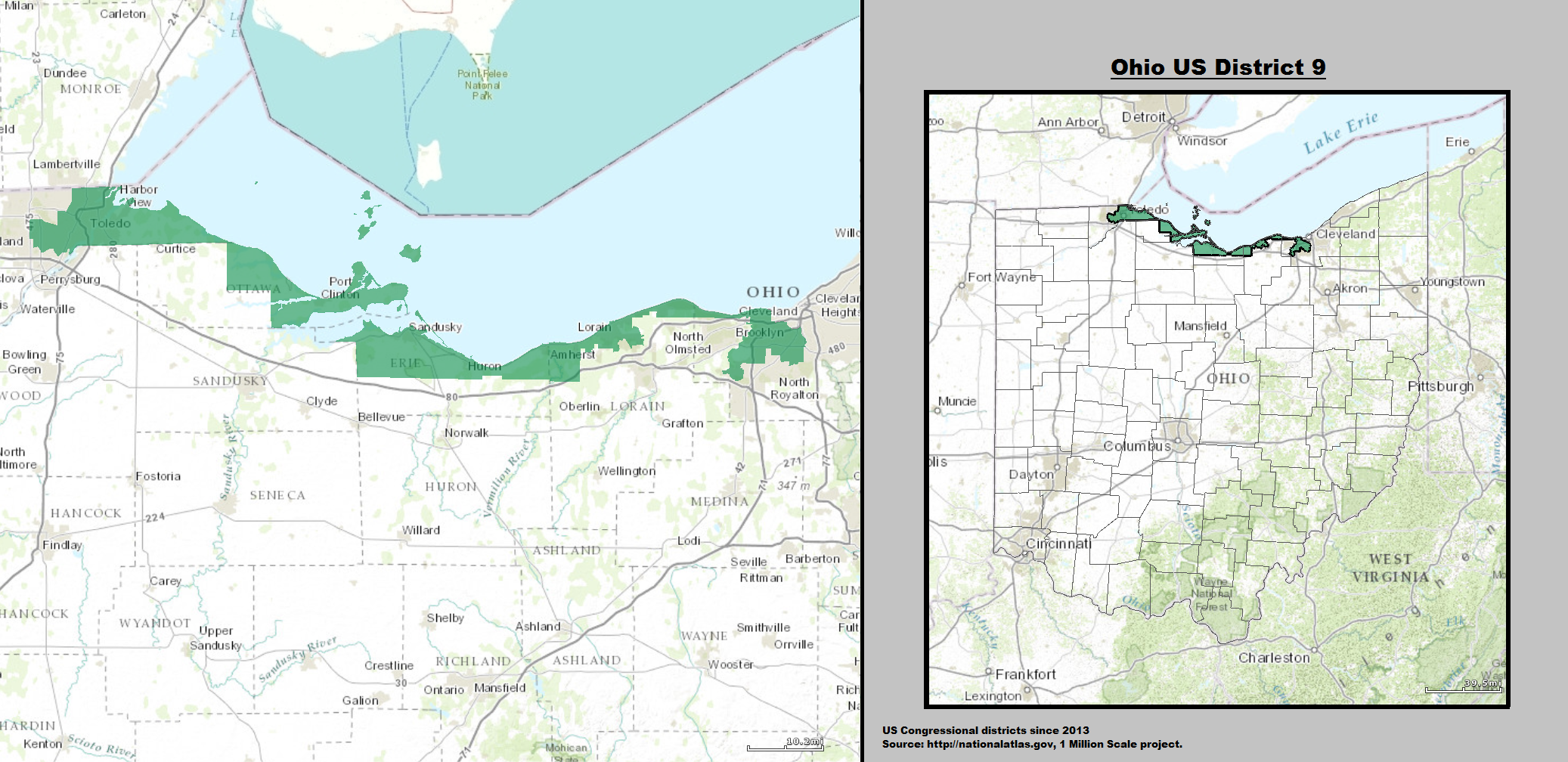
Ohio's 9th district from 2013 to 2023

Kaptur's electoral margins began to narrow in the 2010s, reflecting growing political competitiveness in the region. Shortly after achieving fame during the 2008 election, conservative figure Samuel "Joe the Plumber" Wurzelbacher announced that he was considering challenging Kaptur in the 2010 election, but chose not to run. Kaptur was instead challenged by Republican Rich Iott, a Tea Party movement favorite. She was reelected to a 15th term with 59% of the vote, her closest victory since 1984.

For her first three decades in Congress, Kaptur represented a compact district centered around Toledo. Redistricting after the 2010 census extended the 9th district to western Cleveland. The new map for the 2012 elections put the home of incumbent 10th district congressman Dennis Kucinich into the 9th, so they ran against each other in the Democratic primary. Graham Veysey, a small-business owner from Cleveland, also ran in the primary. Retaining over 60% of her former territory, Kaptur won the primary with 56% of the vote to Kucinich's 40%. In the general election, she won a 16th term against Wurzelbacher and Libertarian Sean Stipe with 73% of the vote. The reconfigured 9th was no less Democratic than its predecessor, and Kaptur had effectively clinched reelection by defeating Kucinich in the primary.

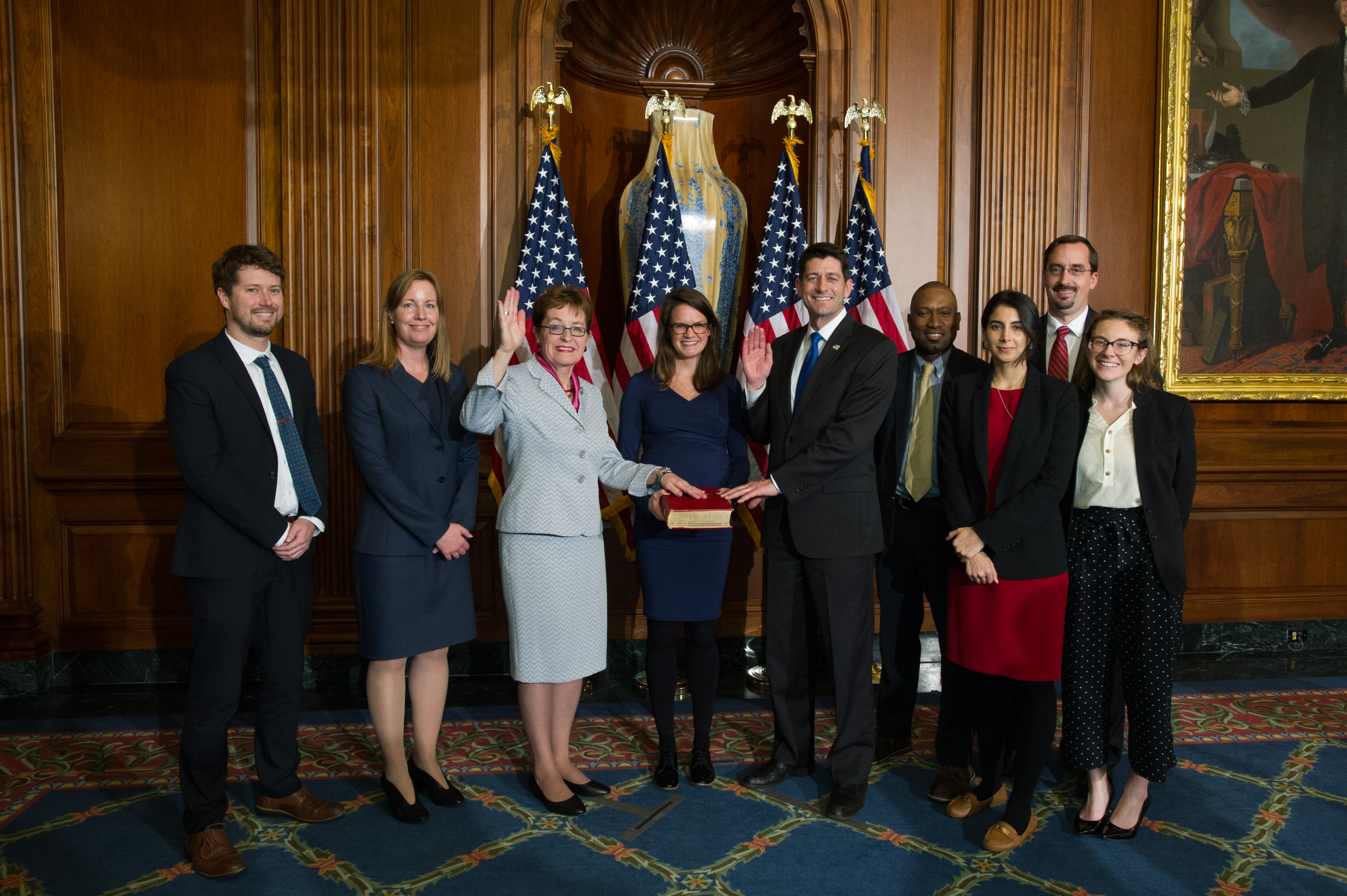
Kaptur being sworn into the 115th U.S. Congress in 2017

Kaptur's 2014 opponent was Richard May, a longtime Republican activist from west Cleveland, who beat Lakewood resident Robert C. Horrocks Jr. in the May 6 primary. Kaptur won 68–32%. Kaptur's 2016 opponent was Donald Larson, who defeated Steven Kraus and Joel Lieske in the Republican primary on March 15. Kaptur won 68–31%.

==== 2020s ====
In the 2020s, Kaptur's district shifted from a reliably Democratic seat to a swing district. Her 2020 opponent was Rob Weber, who defeated Charles W. Barrett, Tim Connors, and Timothy P. Corrigan in the Republican primary on March 17. Kaptur won 63–37%.

Following the 2020 census, redistricting shifted the 9th district westward, incorporating much of the strongly Republican 5th district. While President Joe Biden carried the old district with 59% of the vote, the new district would have narrowly favored Donald Trump with 51%. Despite the unfavorable shift, Kaptur defeated Republican nominee J.R. Majewski in 2022 by a comfortable margin of 56.6% to 43.4%. In 2024, she faced an extremely close race against state representative Derek Merrin, who was endorsed by Trump. Kaptur won reelection by less than one percentage point at 48.3% to Merrin's 47.6%, which marked the first time in her political career that she failed to secure a majority of the vote.

In preparation for the 2026 midterms, Ohio enacted a fresh set of boundaries for its congressional districts. Her district was redrawn to further favor Republican candidates, altering a district that Trump previously won by approximately 7% in 2024 to become a district where he would have won by around 11%. Kaptur sought another term and won the Democratic primary in May 2026. Derek Merrin won a five-candidate Republican primary, setting up a rematch of the 2024 general election. The Democratic Congressional Campaign Committee included Kaptur on its Frontline program for incumbents with close races, and election forecasters rated the contest a toss-up. She won the election, her twenty-third in a row.

=== Tenure ===
Kaptur took office on January 3, 1983. At the time, she became the first woman to represent Ohio's 9th congressional district and was one of 24 women serving in Congress. In her first term, she was appointed to the Banking, Finance, and Urban Affairs Committee as well as the Veterans’ Affairs Committee. During the 1980s, she developed a good working relationship with Speaker Jim Wright, who later appointed her as vice chair of a task force on trade and to the Democratic Steering and Policy Committee. In her fourth term, she gained a position on the Budget Committee and afterwards secured a seat on the Appropriations Committee.

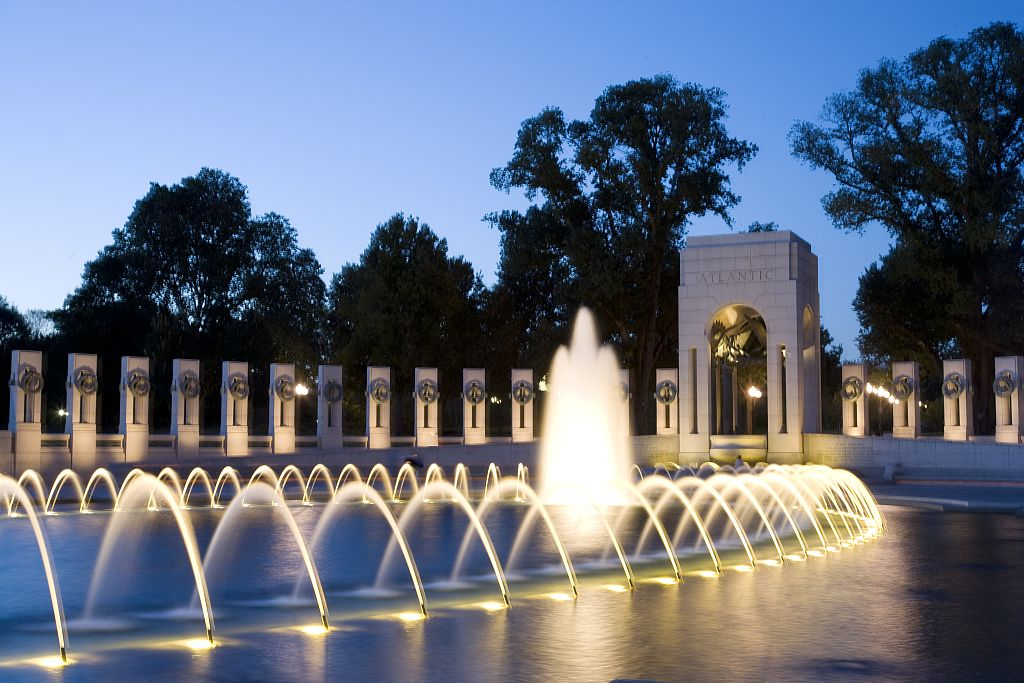
World War II Memorial at dusk

In 1987, Kaptur introduced the World War II Memorial Act in the House. The bill authorized the American Battle Monuments Commission to establish a World War II memorial. It was not voted on before the end of the session and so failed to be enacted. Kaptur introduced similar legislation twice in 1989 but these bills also failed to become law. Kaptur introduced legislation for the fourth time in 1993. This time the legislation was voted on and passed in the House. After a companion bill was passed in the United States Senate, President Bill Clinton signed the bill into law. Kaptur later said that she felt "a great sense of fulfillment" that the memorial was built. "This generation was the most unselfish America has ever seen," she said. "They never asked anybody for anything in return."

In 1993, Kaptur strongly opposed the signing of the North American Free Trade Agreement (NAFTA). She said that the trade agreement would result in widespread job losses as companies outsourced work to lower-wage Mexico. Following NAFTA, she also objected to the General Agreement on Tariffs and Trade (GATT) and the establishment of the World Trade Organization (WTO) in 1995. Kaptur expressed concern that free trade agreements would undermine U.S. economic interests and erode international standards on labor rights, environmental protection, and consumer safety. Despite her efforts, including working with labor unions to block NAFTA and the WTO agreement, both measures passed. Her prominent role in trade policy debates attracted national attention, and in 1996, independent presidential candidate Ross Perot invited her to join his election campaign as a vice-presidential candidate for the 1996 presidential election. She declined the offer.

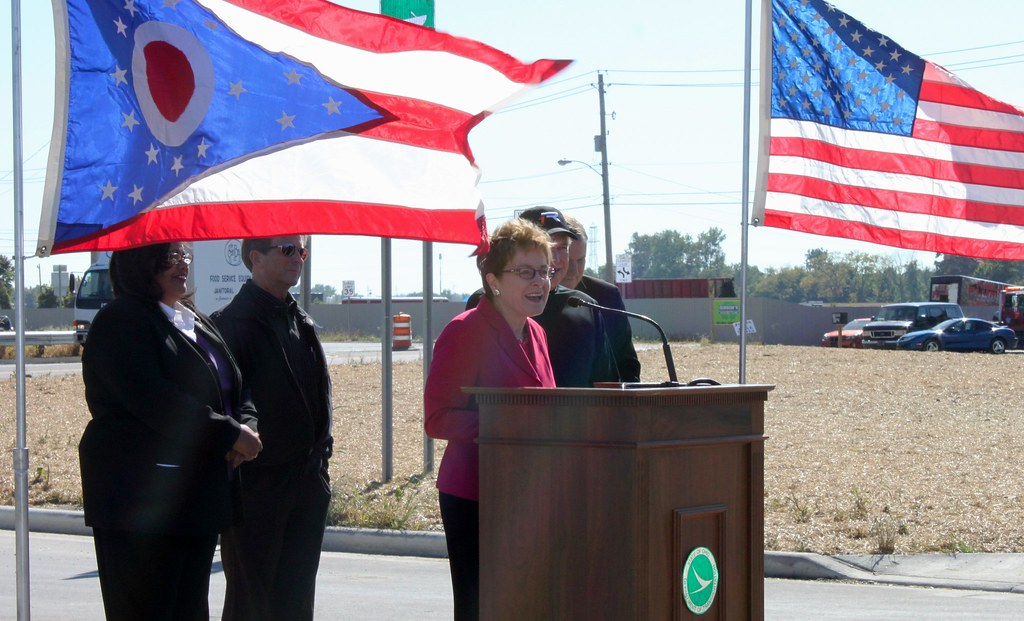
Kaptur speaks at the dedication of a highway project that she helped secure funding for in Sandusky, 2013

Kaptur was a vocal critic of Wall Street and its role in the 2008 financial crisis. She opposed the Emergency Economic Stabilization Act of 2008, which authorized a federal bailout of major U.S. banks. Her position, along with her broader criticism of the financial industry, was featured in Michael Moore’s 2009 documentary Capitalism: A Love Story. In 2011, Kaptur introduced H.R. 1489, a bill aimed at restoring key provisions of the Glass–Steagall Act (1933) by repealing parts of the Gramm–Leach–Bliley Act (1999) and restoring the separation between commercial banking and securities trading. The bill received support from 30 co-sponsors.

In the 2000s, Kaptur sought to steer the Democratic Party towards a greater focus on its working-class base and sought a leadership role by emphasizing her Midwestern "heartland" roots in contrast to the party's coastal leadership. In 2002, she challenged Representative Nancy Pelosi for the position of House Democratic leader, using her candidacy to draw attention to what she described as the party's neglect of its "non-money wing." She withdrew before a vote was taken. In 2008, Kaptur ran for vice chair of the House Democratic Caucus, but lost to Representative Xavier Becerra, a close Pelosi ally. After Democrats lost their House majority in the 2010 midterm elections, Kaptur was among those who called for a delay in leadership elections—an effort some interpreted as encouraging Pelosi to step aside. Reflecting on her differences with Pelosi years later, Kaptur criticized the Democratic leader's support for NAFTA, saying, "That’s where the real knife was put in the flesh."

In 2016, Kaptur endorsed Senator Bernie Sanders in the Democratic presidential primary and introduced him at a rally in Toledo. In October, she endorsed the nominee, Hillary Clinton, who had won Ohio and her district in the primary. In 2018, Kaptur became the longest-serving woman in the House of Representatives, and then in 2023, she became the longest-serving woman in Congress overall.

=== Committee assignments ===
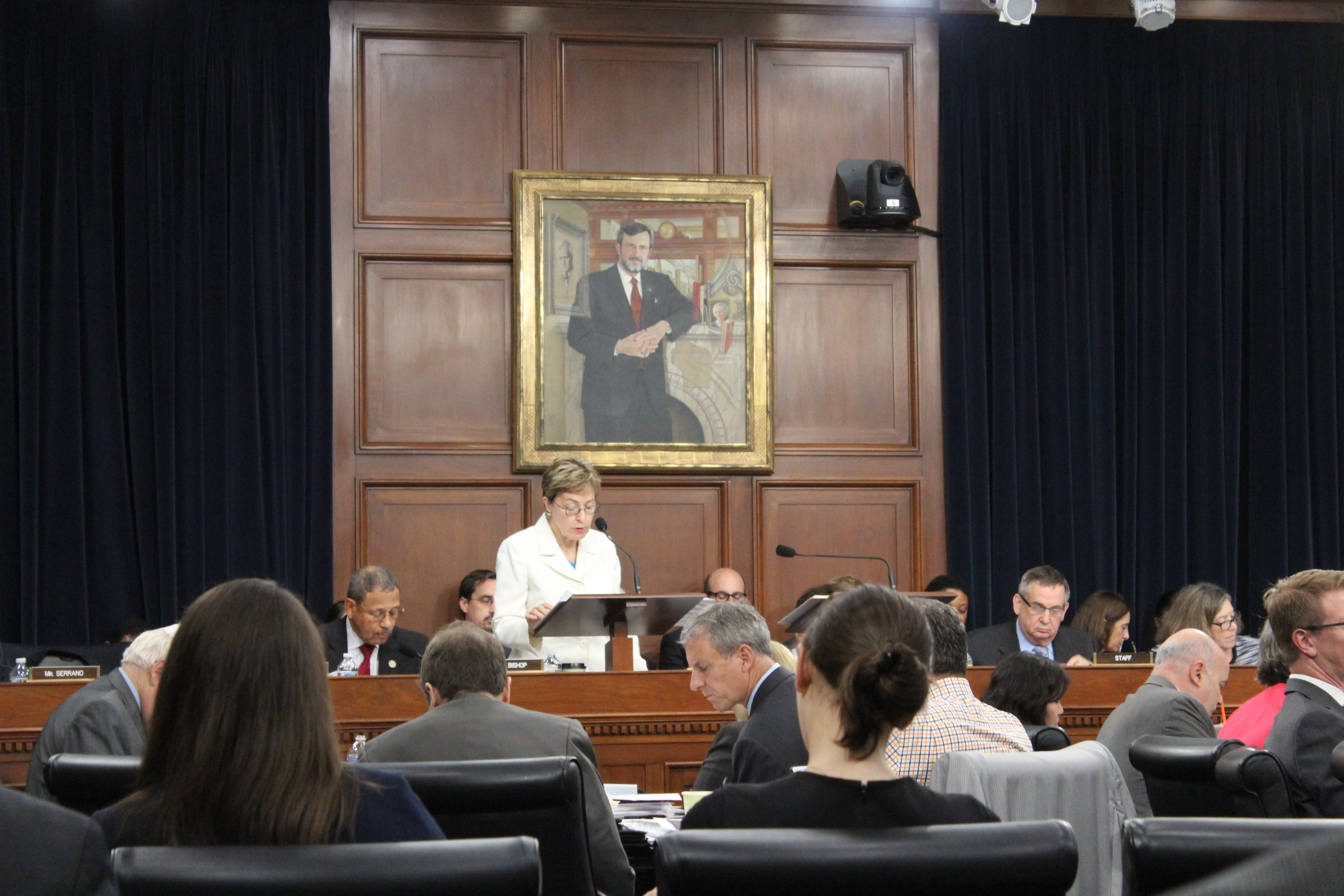
Kaptur on the Appropriations Committee

For the 119th Congress:

- Committee on Appropriations
  - Subcommittee on Agriculture, Rural Development, Food and Drug Administration, and Related Agencies
  - Subcommittee on Defense
  - Subcommittee on Energy and Water Development and Related Agencies (ranking member)
- Committee on the Budget

=== Caucus memberships ===
- Blue Collar Caucus
- Congressional Arts Caucus
- Congressional Caucus on Poland (co-chair)
- Congressional Ukraine Caucus (co-chair)

== Political positions ==
=== Free trade ===
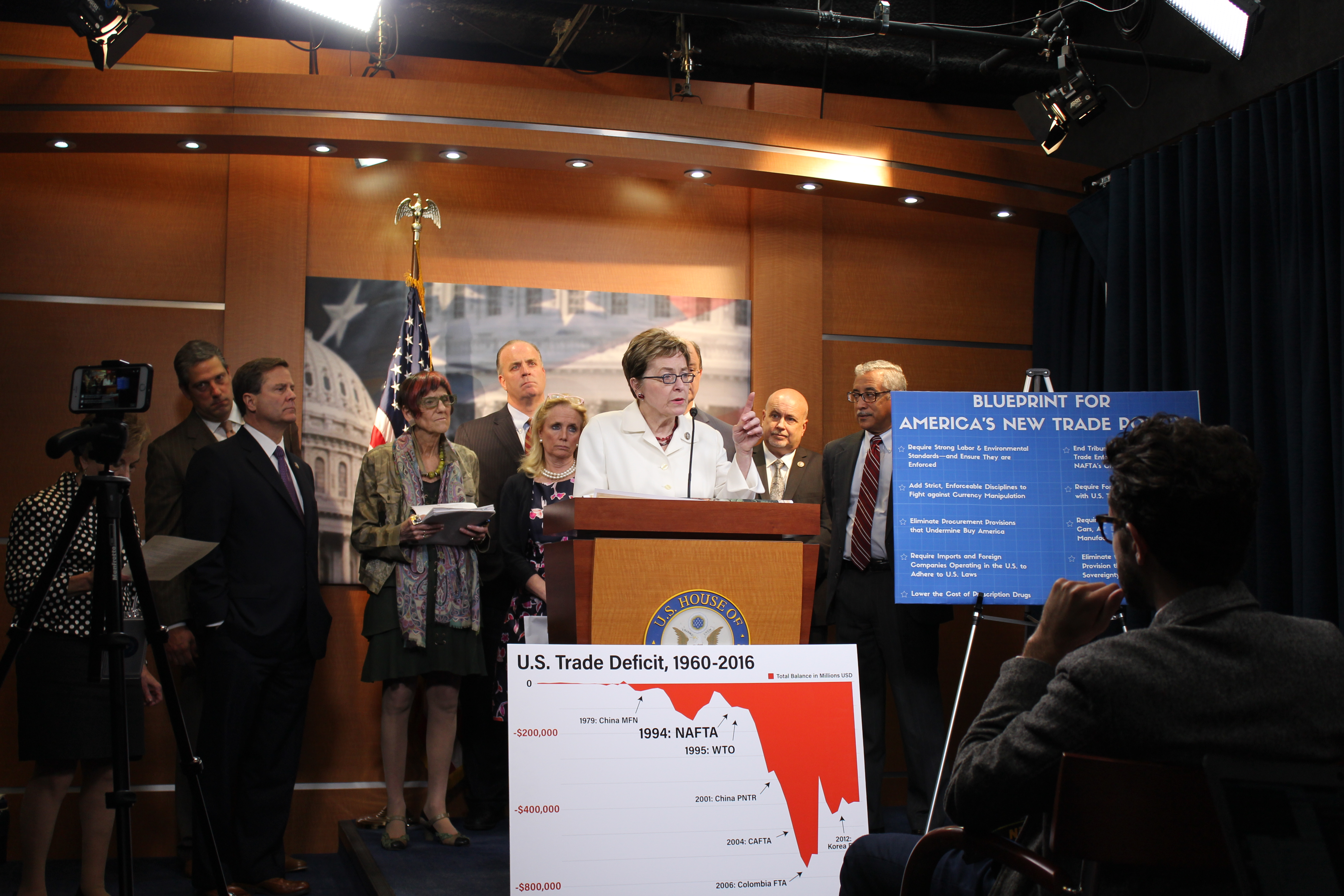
Kaptur discusses the negative effects of free trade agreements on the country's trade deficit, 2017

Kaptur opposes free trade agreements. She helped lead opposition to the North American Free Trade Agreement, permanent normal trade relations for the People's Republic of China, and fast track authority for the president.

=== Patent reform ===
Kaptur opposed the America Invents Act, which overhauled the U.S. patent system by shifting from a "first to invent" to a "first to file" framework. She argued that the change hurt small businesses, stating, "Our patent system is the finest in the world... the proposed solutions are special fixes that benefit these few giants at the expense of everyone else."

She later co-sponsored the Restoring America's Leadership in Innovation Act, which aimed to strengthen inventors’ property rights. The bill proposed eliminating the administrative review process that allows the public to challenge the validity of patents, a process originally designed to prevent misuse of the patent system.

=== Immigration reform ===
In February 2025, Kaptur raised concerns about Elon Musk's U.S. citizenship status, questioning his allegiance due to his multiple nationalities. Speaking outside the Capitol, Kaptur remarked, "Mr. Musk has just been here 22 years. And he’s a citizen of three countries. I always ask myself the question, with the damage he’s doing here, when push comes to shove, which country is his loyalty to? South Africa? Canada? Or the United States? And he’s only been a citizen, I’ll say again, 22 years."

=== Foreign affairs ===
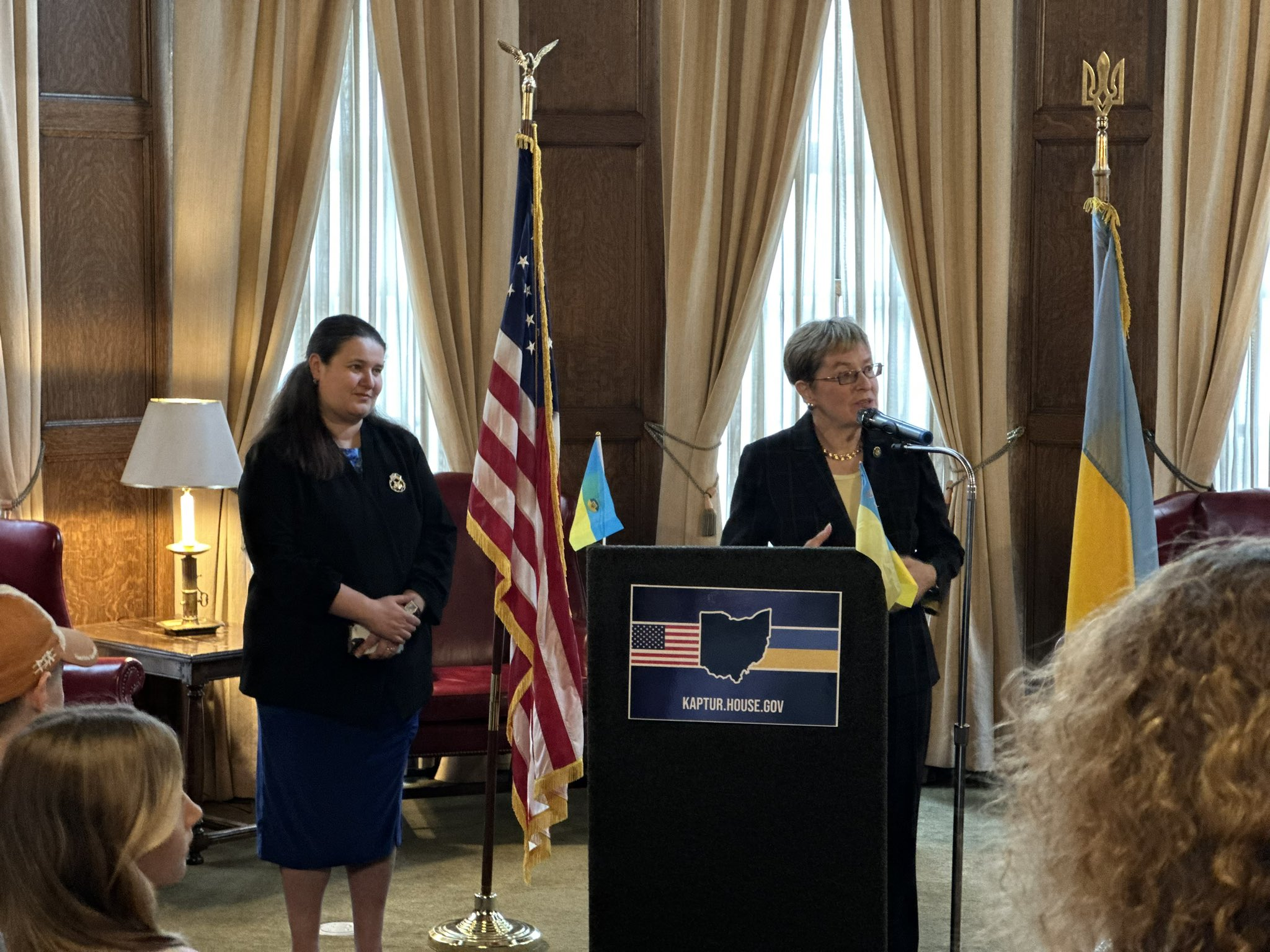
Kaptur speaks in support of Ukrainians affected by the Russo-Ukrainian war, 2023

Kaptur serves as co-chair of the Congressional Ukrainian Caucus and has been a vocal supporter for Ukraine during the Russo-Ukrainian War. She has expressed support for Ukrainian President Volodymyr Zelenskyy and stated that the country "voted for her own independence and has been laboring to be free with continued Russian meddling in her country all these decades." In 2023, Kaptur signed a letter urging President Joe Biden to provide F-16 fighter jets to Ukraine.

=== Abortion ===
Kaptur supported Roe v. Wade, calling it "the law of the land," but describes herself as neither strictly pro-choice nor pro-life. She opposes federal funding for abortions and has backed several restrictions, including bans on so-called partial-birth abortions in 2000 and 2003, the Stupak-Pitts Amendment in 2009, and the No Taxpayer Funding for Abortion Act in 2011. She voted multiple times in the 1990s against allowing privately funded abortions at overseas military hospitals, though she supported lifting the ban in 2005. Her record on other abortion-related legislation has varied. She voted against the Child Custody Protection Act (1999), the Child Interstate Abortion Notification Act (2005), and the Born-Alive Abortion Survivors Protection Act (2023). In 2007, she voted against federally funded embryonic stem-cell research. In 2010, she withheld support for the Affordable Care Act until assured it would not provide funding for abortions. She supports the requirement that Medicaid provide coverage for abortions in cases of rape, incest, or life endangerment.

=== LGBT rights ===
In May 2026, Kaptur was one of eight Democrats to join House Republicans in passing the Stopping Indoctrination and Protecting Kids Act. The bill would require that elementary and middle schools obtain parental consent before changing students' gender markers, pronouns, or preferred names on school forms, as well as before allowing access to sex-segregated facilities, such as bathrooms and locker rooms. It would also bar schools from teaching about transgender related topics. She later highlighted this vote in two television ads that were aired during her re-election campaign.

== Personal life ==
Kaptur is a Roman Catholic and has described her faith as a core part of her identity, particularly as an American of Polish heritage. In a letter to Network Lobby, she wrote that Catholicism gave her ancestors "worth and hope—during times of bondage, repression, punishment, war, illness, and harrowing economic downturns." She has also expressed admiration for Catholic social teaching, especially the option for the poor. Blending her religious beliefs with progressive politics, The Washington Post described her as "an economic populist from America's heartland with progressive values and a conservative disposition."

On August 2, 2026, Kaptur was hospitalized in a hit and run car accident on her way to church. She was released from the hospital a week later and put out a video message saying that her recovery was moving quickly. She returned to Congress in DC six weeks after the accident in September.

== Electoral history ==
Ohio's 9th congressional district: Results 1982–2010
| Year | Democratic | Votes | % | Swing | Republican | Votes | % | Swing | Third parties | Party | Votes | % | Total votes |
|---|---|---|---|---|---|---|---|---|---|---|---|---|---|
| 1982 | Marcy Kaptur | 95,162 | 57.95% | +18.14 | Ed Weber (incumbent) | 64,459 | 39.25% | −16.96 | Susan Skinner | Independent | 1,785 | 1.09% | 164,217 |
| 1982 | Marcy Kaptur | 95,162 | 57.95% | +18.14 | Ed Weber (incumbent) | 64,459 | 39.25% | −16.96 | James Somers | Independent | 1,594 | 0.97% | 164,217 |
| 1982 | Marcy Kaptur | 95,162 | 57.95% | +18.14 | Ed Weber (incumbent) | 64,459 | 39.25% | −16.96 | David Muir | Libertarian | 1,217 | 0.74% | 164,217 |
| 1984 | Marcy Kaptur (incumbent) | 117,985 | 54.90% | −3.05 | Frank Venner | 93,210 | 43.37% | +4.12 | Write-in | | 3,714 | 1.73% | 214,909 |
| 1986 | Marcy Kaptur (incumbent) | 105,646 | 77.52% | +22.62 | Mike Shufeldt | 30,643 | 22.48% | −20.89 | | | | | 136,289 |
| 1988 | Marcy Kaptur (incumbent) | 157,557 | 81.29% | +3.77 | Al Hawkins | 36,183 | 18.67% | −3.81 | Write-in | | 72 | 0.04% | 193,812 |
| 1990 | Marcy Kaptur (incumbent) | 117,681 | 77.69% | −3.60 | Jerry Lammers | 33,791 | 22.31% | +3.64 | | | | | 151,472 |
| 1992 | Marcy Kaptur (incumbent) | 178,879 | 73.58% | −4.11 | Ken Brown | 53,011 | 21.81% | −0.50 | Edward Howard | Independent | 11,162 | 4.59% | 243,102 |
| 1992 | Marcy Kaptur (incumbent) | 178,879 | 73.58% | −4.11 | Ken Brown | 53,011 | 21.81% | −0.50 | Write-in | | 50 | 0.02% | 243,102 |
| 1994 | Marcy Kaptur (incumbent) | 118,120 | 75.34% | +1.76 | Randy Whitman | 38,665 | 24.66% | +2.85 | | | | | 156,785 |
| 1996 | Marcy Kaptur (incumbent) | 170,617 | 77.08% | +1.74 | Randy Whitman | 46,040 | 20.80% | −3.86 | Elizabeth Slotnick | Natural Law | 4,677 | 2.11% | 221,334 |
| 1998 | Marcy Kaptur (incumbent) | 130,793 | 81.18% | +4.10 | Ed Emery | 30,312 | 18.12% | −2.68 | | | | | 161,105 |
| 2000 | Marcy Kaptur (incumbent) | 168,547 | 74.80% | −6.38 | Dwight Bryan | 49,446 | 21.94% | +3.82 | Galen Fries | Libertarian | 4,239 | 1.88% | 225,328 |
| 2000 | Marcy Kaptur (incumbent) | 168,547 | 74.80% | −6.38 | Dwight Bryan | 49,446 | 21.94% | +3.82 | Dennis Slotnick | Natural Law | 3,096 | 1.37% | 225,328 |
| 2002 | Marcy Kaptur (incumbent) | 132,236 | 73.99% | −0.81 | Ed Emery | 46,481 | 26.01% | +4.07 | | | | | 178,717 |
| 2004 | Marcy Kaptur (incumbent) | 205,149 | 68.13% | −5.86 | Larry Kaczala | 95,983 | 31.87% | +5.86 | | | | | 301,132 |
| 2006 | Marcy Kaptur (incumbent) | 153,880 | 73.63% | +5.50 | Bradley Leavitt | 55,119 | 26.37% | −5.50 | | | | | 208,999 |
| 2008 | Marcy Kaptur (incumbent) | 222,054 | 74.37% | +0.74 | Bradley Leavitt | 76,512 | 25.63% | −0.74 | | | | | 298,566 |
| 2010 | Marcy Kaptur (incumbent) | 121,819 | 59.35% | −15.02 | Rich Iott | 83,423 | 40.65% | +15.02 | | | | | 205,242 |

US House election, 2012: Ohio District 9
| Party | Candidate | Votes | % | ±% |
|---|---|---|---|---|
| Democratic | Marcy Kaptur (incumbent) | 42,902 | 56.18% | |
| Democratic | Dennis Kucinich (incumbent) | 30,564 | 40.02% | |
| Democratic | Graham Veysey | 2,900 | 3.80% | |
| Total votes | | 76,366 | 100% | |
| Democratic | Marcy Kaptur (incumbent) | 217,775 | 73.04% | +13.69 |
| Republican | Samuel Wurzelbacher | 68,666 | 23.03% | −17.62 |
| Libertarian | Sean Stipe | 11,725 | 3.93% | N/A |
| Total votes | | 298,166 | 100% | |
| Democratic hold | | | | |

US House election, 2014: Ohio District 9
| Party | Candidate | Votes | % | ±% |
|---|---|---|---|---|
| Democratic | Marcy Kaptur (incumbent) | 108,870 | 67.74% | −5.30 |
| Republican | Richard May | 51,704 | 32.17% | +9.14 |
| Write-in | | 141 | 0.09% | N/A |
| Total votes | | 160,715 | 100% | |
| Democratic hold | | | | |

US House election, 2016: Ohio District 9
| Party | Candidate | Votes | % | ±% |
|---|---|---|---|---|
| Democratic | Marcy Kaptur (incumbent) | 193,966 | 68.69% | +0.95 |
| Republican | Donald Larson | 88,427 | 31.31% | −0.86 |
| Write-in | | 5 | 0.00% | N/A |
| Total votes | | 282,398 | 100% | |
| Democratic hold | | | | |

US House election, 2018: Ohio District 9
| Party | Candidate | Votes | % | ±% |
|---|---|---|---|---|
| Democratic | Marcy Kaptur (incumbent) | 157,219 | 67.79% | −0.90 |
| Republican | Steve Kraus | 74,670 | 32.19% | +0.88 |
| Write-in | | 48 | 0.02% | N/A |
| Total votes | | 231,937 | 100% | |
| Democratic hold | | | | |

US House election, 2020: Ohio District 9
| Party | Candidate | Votes | % | ±% |
|---|---|---|---|---|
| Democratic | Marcy Kaptur (incumbent) | 190,328 | 63.07% | −4.72 |
| Republican | Rob Weber | 111,385 | 36.91% | +4.72 |
| Write-in | | 39 | 0.01% | N/A |
| Total votes | | 301,752 | 100% | |
| Democratic hold | | | | |

US House election, 2022: Ohio District 9
| Party | Candidate | Votes | % | ±% |
|---|---|---|---|---|
| Democratic | Marcy Kaptur (incumbent) | 150,655 | 56.63% | −6.44 |
| Republican | J.R. Majewski | 115,362 | 43.37% | +6.46 |
| Total votes | | 266,017 | 100% | |
| Democratic hold | | | | |

US House election, 2024: Ohio District 9
| Party | Candidate | Votes | % | ±% |
|---|---|---|---|---|
| Democratic | Marcy Kaptur (incumbent) | 181,098 | 48.27% | −8.36 |
| Republican | Derek Merrin | 178,716 | 47.63% | +4.26 |
| Libertarian | Tom Pruss | 15,381 | 4.10% | N/A |
| Total votes | | 375,195 | 100% | |
| Democratic hold | | | | |

US House election, 2026: Ohio District 9
| Party | Candidate | Votes | % | ±% |
|---|---|---|---|---|
| Democratic | Marcy Kaptur (incumbent) | 159,306 | 52.73% | +4.46 |
| Republican | Derek Merrin | 142,830 | 47.27% | −0.36 |
| Total votes | | 302,136 | 100% | |
| Democratic hold | | | | |

== See also ==
- Ohio's 9th congressional district
- List of United States representatives from Ohio
- National World War II Memorial
- Women in the United States House of Representatives

U.S. House of Representatives
| Preceded by Ed Weber | Member of the U.S. House of Representatives from Ohio's 9th congressional district 1983–present | Incumbent |
Honorary titles
| Preceded by Steny Hoyer | Most senior Democrat in the U.S. House of Representatives; Taking office 2027 | Designate |
U.S. order of precedence (ceremonial)
| Preceded by Steny Hoyer | United States representatives by seniority 4th | Succeeded by Nancy Pelosi |
| Preceded by Steny Hoyer | Order of precedence of the United States | Succeeded by Nancy Pelosi |
