= Ed Weber =

American former politician from Ohio

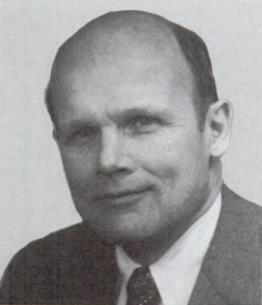
- Official portrait, 1981

Member of the U.S. House of Representatives from Ohio's 9th district
- In office January 3, 1981 – January 3, 1983
- Preceded by: Thomas L. Ashley
- Succeeded by: Marcy Kaptur

Personal details
- Born: Edward Ford Weber; July 26, 1931 Toledo, Ohio, U.S.
- Died: February 27, 2023 (aged 91) Perrysburg Township, Wood County, Ohio, U.S.
- Party: Republican
- Education: Denison University (BA); Harvard University (JD)

Military service
- Allegiance: United States
- Branch/service: United States Army
- Years of service: 1956–1958

Edward Ford Weber (July 26, 1931 – February 27, 2023) was an American lawyer, military veteran and politician from Ohio. He served one term in the United States House of Representatives as a Republican from 1981 to 1983. He also served on the Board of Directors at the Toledo Museum of Art from at least 2011 to 2019.

== Early life and education ==
Weber was born in Toledo, Ohio. He earned a Bachelor of Arts degree from Denison University and a Bachelor of Laws (LLB) from Harvard Law School. Harvard Law School offered to change his degree to Juris Doctor (JD), but he declined. After graduation, Weber served two years in the United States Army.

== Career ==
After his discharge in 1958, Weber began to practice law. In 1966, the University of Toledo College of Law hired him as a professor.

=== Congress ===
In 1980, Weber ran for Ohio's 9th congressional district in the United States House of Representatives. He defeated 26-year incumbent Thomas L. Ashley, chairman of the United States House Committee on Merchant Marine and Fisheries. This was due largely to Ronald Reagan carrying Lucas County, home to Toledo.

Weber voted for the Economic Recovery Tax Act of 1981. The Act aimed to stimulate economic growth by significantly reducing income tax rates. It passed the House of Representatives in a 323–107 vote, the Senate via a voice vote, and it was signed into law by President Ronald Reagan on August 13, 1981. Weber also voted for the Omnibus Budget Reconciliation Act of 1981. The Act decreased federal spending and increased military funding. It passed the House of Representatives in a 232–193 vote, the Senate via a voice vote, and it was signed into law by President Ronald Reagan the same day.

In 1982, he lost his reelection bid to Marcy Kaptur.

=== Death ===
He died on February 27, 2023, at the age of 91.

== Electoral history ==
Year	Democratic	Republican	Other
1980	Thomas L. Ashley (Incumbent): 68,728	✓ Ed Weber: 96,927	Edward S. Emery: 4,357; Toby Elizabeth Emmerich: 2,411
1982	✓ Marcy Kaptur: 95,162	Ed Weber (Incumbent): 64,459	David Muir (Libertarian): 1,217; Susan A. Skinner: 1,785; James J. Somers: 1,594

== See also ==
- List of United States representatives from Ohio

U.S. House of Representatives
Preceded by Thomas L. Ashley	Member of the U.S. House of Representatives from Ohio's 9th congressional district 1981-1983	Succeeded by Marcy Kaptur
