= James Wallace Robinson =

American lawyer and politician

James W. Robinson
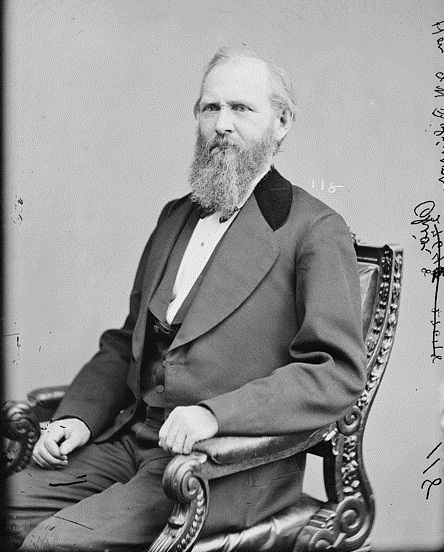

Member of the U.S. House of Representatives from Ohio's 9th district
- In office March 4, 1873 – March 3, 1875
- Preceded by: Charles Foster
- Succeeded by: Earley F. Poppleton

Member of the Ohio House of Representatives from the Union County district
- In office January 4, 1858 – January 5, 1862
- Preceded by: William Gabriel
- Succeeded by: William H. Robb
- In office 1864 – December 31, 1865
- Preceded by: A. J. Sterling (resigned)
- Succeeded by: M. C. Lawrence

Personal details
- Born: James Wallace Robinson; November 26, 1826 Unionville Center, Ohio
- Died: June 28, 1898 (aged 71) Marysville, Ohio
- Resting place: Oakdale Cemetery
- Party: Republican
- Spouse(s): Mary J. Cassil; Mary E. Kent
- Children: two
- Relatives: Descendants of Robert Coe
- Education: Jefferson College; Cincinnati Law School
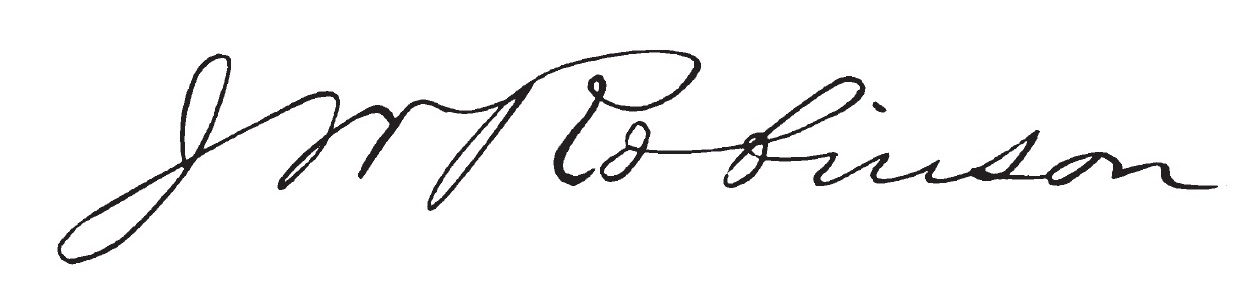
- Signature

James Wallace Robinson (November 26, 1826 – June 28, 1898) was an American lawyer and politician who served one term as a U.S. representative from Ohio from 1873 to 1875.

== Life and career ==
Born in the township of Darby, near Unionville Center, Ohio, Robinson attended the common schools and Marysville Academy. He was graduated from Jefferson College, Canonsburg, Pennsylvania, in 1848. He studied law first with Otway Curry, and graduated from Cincinnati Law School in 1851.

=== Early career ===
He was admitted to the bar in the latter year and commenced practice in London, Ohio, partnering with Curry. He served as prosecuting attorney of Union County for two terms, elected as a Whig.

He moved to Marysville, Ohio, in 1855. He served as member of the State house of representatives 1860–1862, and in 1864 was elected to fill an unexpired term.

== Congress ==
Robinson was elected as a Republican to the Forty-third Congress (March 4, 1873 – March 3, 1875). He was an unsuccessful candidate for reelection in 1874 to the Forty-fourth Congress.

He resumed the practice of his profession.

== Death ==
He died in Marysville, Ohio, June 28, 1898. He was interred in Oakdale Cemetery.

== Private life ==
Robinson was a Presbyterian, and an elder in the church beginning in 1855. He was a member of the Board of Trustees of the College of Wooster, which conferred a LL.D. on him in 1896.

=== Family ===
He was married to Mary J. Cassil of Marysville, and had two children and died in 1894. In 1896 he married Mary E. Kent of Rome, New York.

His nephew, James E. Robinson, was an associate justice of the Supreme Court of Ohio and a maternal great-grandfather of George W. Bush.

== Sources ==
- United States Congress. "James Wallace Robinson (id: R000340)". Biographical Directory of the United States Congress.

U.S. House of Representatives
Preceded by Charles Foster	Member of the U.S. House of Representatives from Ohio's 9th congressional district March 4, 1873–March 3, 1875	Succeeded by Earley F. Poppleton
