= William W. Chalmers =

American politician (1861–1944)

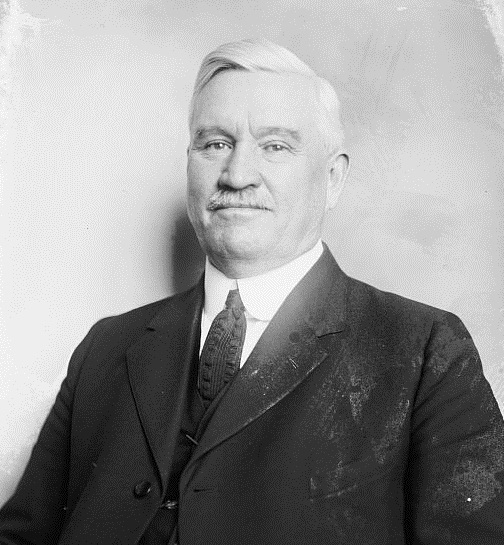
- 1921 or 1922

Member of the U.S. House of Representatives from Ohio's 9th district
- In office March 4, 1921 – March 3, 1923
- Preceded by: Isaac R. Sherwood
- Succeeded by: Isaac R. Sherwood
- In office March 4, 1925 – March 3, 1931
- Preceded by: Isaac R. Sherwood
- Succeeded by: Wilbur M. White

Personal details
- Born: William Wallace Chalmers; November 1, 1861 Strathroy, Ontario, Canada
- Died: October 1, 1944 (aged 82) Indianapolis, Indiana, U.S.
- Resting place: Crown Hill Cemetery and Arboretum, Section 66, Lot 273
- Party: Republican
- Education: University of Michigan; Michigan State Normal School; Heidelberg University

William Wallace Chalmers (November 1, 1861 – October 1, 1944) was an American educator who served as president of the University of Toledo and as a U.S. representative from Ohio.

== Biography ==
Born in Strathroy, Canada West, Chalmers moved with his parents to Kent County, near Grand Rapids, Michigan, in 1865. He attended the public schools, and Michigan State Normal School. He graduated from the University of Michigan at Ann Arbor in 1887, from Eureka College in 1889, and from Heidelberg University, Tiffin, Ohio, in 1904. He was a teacher and principal of schools until 1890. Superintendent of schools in Grand Rapids, Michigan from 1890 to 1898 and in Toledo, Ohio from 1898 to 1905.

He served as president of the University of Toledo in 1904. He engaged at different periods in farming, lumbering and, in the real-estate and insurance business at Toledo, Ohio.

=== Congress ===
Chalmers was elected as a Republican to the Sixty-seventh Congress (March 4, 1921 – March 3, 1923).

He was an unsuccessful candidate for reelection in 1922 to the Sixty-eighth Congress.

Chalmers was elected to the Sixty-ninth, Seventieth, and Seventy-first Congresses (March 4, 1925 – March 3, 1931).

He was an unsuccessful candidate for renomination in 1930.

== Death and burial ==
He died in Indianapolis, Indiana, on October 1, 1944. He was interred in Crown Hill Cemetery.

== Electoral history ==
Year	Democratic	Republican	Other
1920	Isaac R. Sherwood: 38,292	✓ William W. Chalmers (Incumbent): 49,732	Karl E. Pauli: 47
1922	✓ Isaac R. Sherwood: 45,059	William W. Chalmers (Incumbent): 42,712	(none)
1924	Isaac R. Sherwood (Incumbent): 48,482	✓ William W. Chalmers: 54,792	Millard Price (Prohibition): 2,159; John Kocinski: 747
1926	C. W. Davis: 23,947	✓ William W. Chalmers (Incumbent): 47,331	George F. Parrish (TRI): 1,110; Millard Price (Socialist): 1,018
1928	William P. Clarke: 50,601	✓ William W. Chalmers (Incumbent): 82,560	Charles V. Stephenson (Workers): 190
1930	Scott Stahl: 36,375	✓ Wilbur M. White: 49,498	(none)

== Sources ==
- United States Congress. "William W. Chalmers (id: C000274)". Biographical Directory of the United States Congress.

U.S. House of Representatives
Preceded by Isaac R. Sherwood	Member of the U.S. House of Representatives from Ohio's 9th congressional district March 4, 1921–March 3, 1923	Succeeded by Isaac R. Sherwood
Preceded by Isaac R. Sherwood	Member of the U.S. House of Representatives from Ohio's 9th congressional district March 4, 1925–March 3, 1931	Succeeded by Wilbur M. White
