= Earley F. Poppleton =

American politician

Early F. Poppleton

Member of the U.S. House of Representatives from Ohio's 9th district
- In office March 4, 1875 – March 3, 1877
- Preceded by: James Wallace Robinson
- Succeeded by: John S. Jones

Member of the Ohio Senate from the 16th district
- In office January 3, 1871 – December 31, 1871
- Preceded by: James Randolph Hubbell
- Succeeded by: John B. Jones

Personal details
- Born: Earley Franklin Poppleton; September 29, 1834 Bellville, Ohio, US
- Died: May 6, 1899 (aged 64) Delaware, Ohio, US
- Resting place: Oak Grove Cemetery, Delaware, Ohio
- Party: Democratic
- Education: Ohio Wesleyan University

Earley Franklin Poppleton (September 29, 1834 – May 6, 1899) was an American lawyer and politician who served one term as a U.S. representative from Ohio from 1875 to 1877.

== Biography ==
Born in Bellville, Ohio, Poppleton pursued classical studies. He was educated at the Ohio Wesleyan University at Delaware. He studied law.

=== Legal career ===
He was admitted to the bar and commenced law practice in Elyria, Ohio. He moved to Delaware, Ohio, in 1861 and continued the practice of his profession.

He served as member of the State senate in 1870.

=== Congress ===
Poppleton was elected as a Democrat to the Forty-fourth Congress (March 4, 1875 – March 3, 1877). He was an unsuccessful candidate for reelection. He resumed the practice of law.

=== Death ===
He died in Delaware, Ohio, May 6, 1899, at the age of 64. He was interred in Oak Grove Cemetery.

U.S. House of Representatives
Preceded by James W. Robinson	Member of the U.S. House of Representatives from Ohio's 9th congressional district March 4, 1875–March 3, 1877	Succeeded by John S. Jones
