= Warren J. Duffey =

American politician

Warren J. Duffy
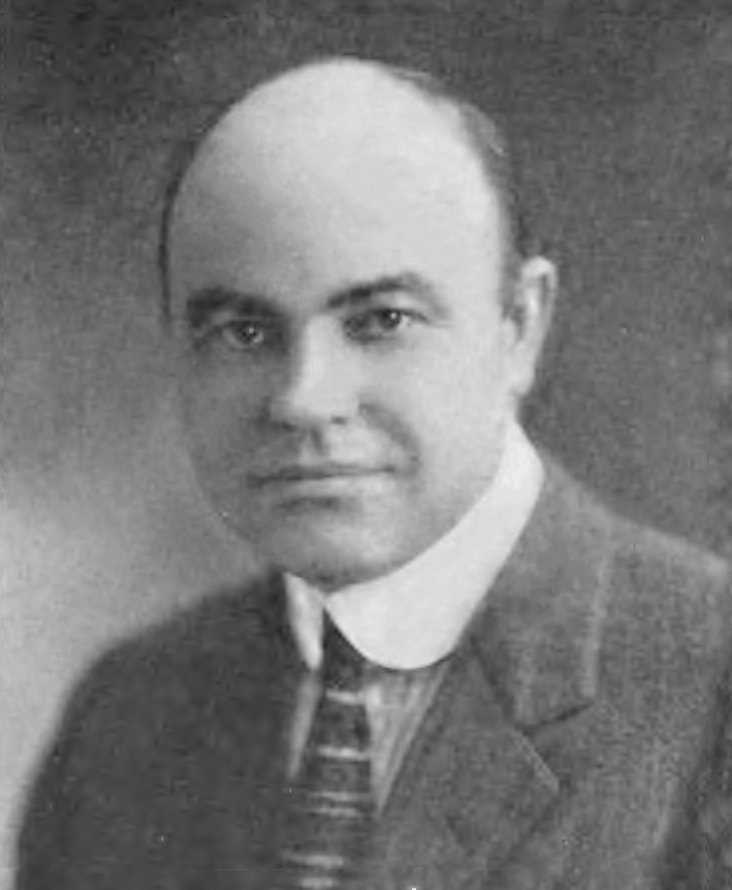

Member of the U.S. House of Representatives from Ohio's 9th district
- In office March 4, 1933 – July 7, 1936
- Preceded by: Wilbur M. White
- Succeeded by: John F. Hunter

Member of the Ohio House of Representatives from the Lucas County district
- In office January 6, 1913 – January 3, 1915 Serving with Lawrence F. Conway; W. T. Colter; James Nye
- Preceded by: W. T. Colter; Myer Geleerd; Frank Hillencamp; M. J. Jenkins
- Succeeded by: C. A. Benedict; William E. Entemann; Joseph O. Eppstein; Harry S. Fox

Personal details
- Born: Warren Joseph Duffey; January 24, 1886 Toledo, Ohio
- Died: July 7, 1936 (aged 50) Toledo, Ohio
- Resting place: Calvary Cemetery, Toledo
- Party: Democratic
- Education: St. John's, Toledo; University of Michigan Law School

Warren Joseph Duffey (January 24, 1886 – July 7, 1936) was an American lawyer and politician from Ohio who was elected to two terms in the United States House of Representatives, serving from 1933 until his death in 1936.

== Early life and education ==
Born in Toledo, Ohio, Duffey attended the public schools.

Duffey graduated from St. John's University in Toledo, Ohio, in 1908 and from the law department of the University of Michigan at Ann Arbor in 1911. Duffey was admitted to the bar the same year and commenced the practice of law in Toledo, Ohio.

== Political career ==
Duffey served in the Ohio House of Representatives in 1913 and 1914 and as a member of the Toledo City Council in 1917 and 1918. He served as chairman of the Lucas County Democratic central committee from 1919 and 1932 and was a delegate to the 1932 Democratic National Convention.

=== Congress ===
Duffey was elected as a Democrat to the Seventy-third and Seventy-fourth Congresses and served from March 4, 1933, until his death. He was an unsuccessful candidate for renomination in 1936.

== Death ==
Duffey died while in office at the age of 50. He died in Toledo, Ohio on July 7, 1936, and is interred in Calvary Cemetery.

== Electoral history ==
Year	Democratic	Republican	Other
1932	✓ Warren J. Duffey: 56,755	Wilbur M. White (Incumbent): 54,078	Silas E. Hurin: 4,200; Clyde E. Kiker: 2,135; Karl Pauli (Socialist): 1,314; Eugene Stoll (Communist): 620
1934	✓ Warren J. Duffey (Incumbent): 61,037	Frank L. Mulholland: 35,732	Kenneth Eggert (Communist): 684; Karl Pauli (Socialist): 510

== See also ==
- List of members of the United States Congress who died in office (1900–1949)

== Sources ==
- United States Congress. "Warren J. Duffey (id: D000517)". Biographical Directory of the United States Congress.

U.S. House of Representatives
Preceded by Wilbur M. White	Member of the U.S. House of Representatives from Ohio's 9th congressional district March 4, 1933–July 7, 1936	Succeeded by John F. Hunter
