= Elias Florence =

American politician

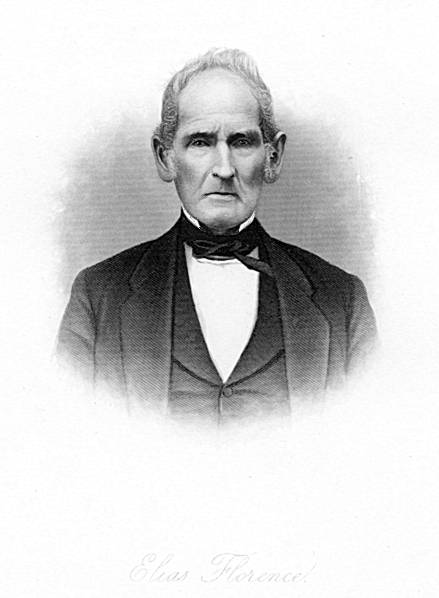

Member of the U.S. House of Representatives from Ohio's 9th district
- In office March 4, 1843 – March 3, 1845
- Preceded by: William Medill
- Succeeded by: Augustus L. Perrill

Member of the Ohio House of Representatives from the Pickaway County district
- In office December 7, 1829 – December 4, 1831 Serving with James Moore, Samuel Lutz
- Preceded by: Val Keffer
- Succeeded by: John Cochran, Samuel Lutz
- In office December 2, 1833 – November 30, 1834 Serving with John Shoup
- Preceded by: John Cochran
- Succeeded by: John Cochran
- In office December 7, 1840 – December 5, 1841
- Preceded by: Augustus L. Perrill
- Succeeded by: Joseph Olds

Member of the Ohio Senate from the Franklin & Pickaway Counties district
- In office December 7, 1835 – December 3, 1837
- Preceded by: Ralph Osborn
- Succeeded by: John L. Greene

Personal details
- Born: February 15, 1797 Fauquier County, Virginia, U.S.
- Died: November 21, 1880 (aged 83) Muhlenberg Township, Ohio, U.S.
- Party: Whig

Elias Florence (February 15, 1797 – November 21, 1880) was a U.S. representative from Ohio.

Born in Fauquier County, Virginia, he attended the public schools and studied agriculture. He later moved to Ohio and settled in Circleville, Pickaway County. He served as member of the Ohio House of Representatives in 1829, 1830, 1834, and 1840, and served in the Ohio Senate in 1835.

He was elected as a Whig to the Twenty-eighth Congress (March 4, 1843 – March 3, 1845). In 1850, he served as member of the state constitutional convention. Thereafter he resumed agricultural pursuits. He died in Muhlenberg Township, Ohio, November 21, 1880 and was interred in Forest Cemetery in Circleville.

U.S. House of Representatives
Preceded by William Medill	Member of the U.S. House of Representatives from Ohio's 9th congressional district 1843-1845	Succeeded by Augustus L. Perrill
