= Edson B. Olds =

American politician

Edson Olds
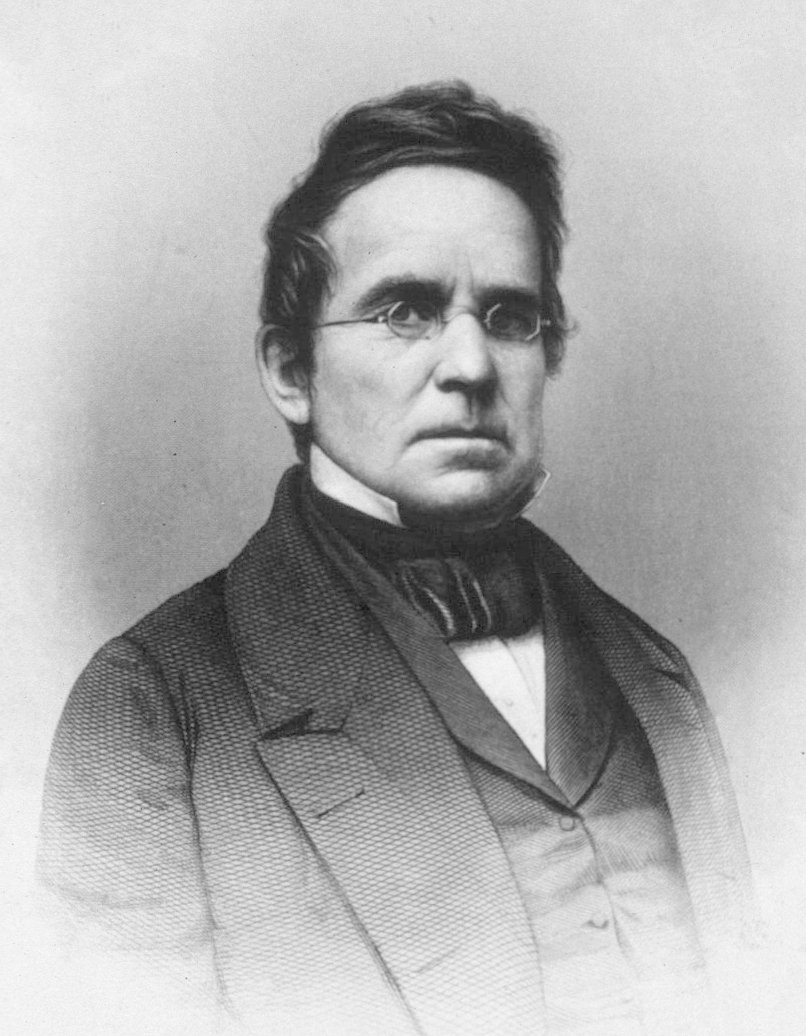

Chairman of the House Democratic Caucus
- In office March 4, 1853 – March 3, 1855
- Speaker: Linn Boyd
- Preceded by: James Thompson (1851)
- Succeeded by: George W. Jones

Member of the U.S. House of Representatives from Ohio
- In office March 4, 1849 – March 3, 1855
- Preceded by: Thomas O. Edwards
- Succeeded by: Samuel Galloway
- Constituency: 9th district (1849–1853); 12th district (1853–1855)

Member of the Ohio House of Representatives
- In office 1842-1843; 1845-1846

Member of the Ohio Senate
- In office 1846-1848

Personal details
- Born: Edson Baldwin Olds; June 3, 1802 Marlboro, Vermont, US
- Died: January 24, 1869 (aged 66) Lancaster, Ohio, US
- Resting place: Forest Cemetery, Circleville, Ohio
- Party: Democratic
- Spouse: Anna Maria Carolus
- Children: 9
- Education: University of Pennsylvania

Edson Baldwin Olds (June 3, 1802 – January 24, 1869) was a three-term U.S. Representative from Ohio, serving from 1849 to 1855.

During the American Civil War, he was a leading member of the Peace Democrats.

He was the great-grandfather of United States Army Air Forces Maj. Gen. Robert Olds, and the great-great grandfather of United States Air Force Brig. Gen. Robin Olds.

== Early life ==
Born in Marlboro, Vermont, Olds completed preparatory studies. He moved to Ohio about 1820 and taught school. He graduated from the medical department of the University of Pennsylvania in 1824 and commenced the practice of medicine in Kingston, Ohio, in 1824. He moved to Circleville, Ohio, in 1828 and continued practice until 1837, when he engaged in the general produce business and mercantile pursuits.

== Start of political career ==
He served as member of the Ohio House of Representatives in 1842, 1843, 1845, and 1846. He served in the Ohio Senate 1846–1848 and was its presiding officer in 1846 and 1847.

Olds was elected as a Democrat to the Thirty-first, Thirty-second, and Thirty-third Congresses (March 4, 1849 – March 3, 1855). He served as chairman of the Committee on the Post Office and Post Roads (Thirty-second and Thirty-third Congresses). He was an unsuccessful candidate for reelection in 1854 to the Thirty-fourth Congress. He moved to Lancaster, Ohio, in 1857.

== American Civil War ==
During the Civil War, Olds was outspoken in his opposition to the policies of the Radical Republicans. On July 27, 1862, an unnamed resident of Lancaster, Ohio sent Governor David Tod a letter about Olds. In the letter, he accused Olds of discouraging enlistments. He attributed a statement to Olds accusing the government of “tyranny engaged in a war to destroy the Union, overthrow the Constitution, and liberate the slaves.” Tod sent a copy of the letter to William H. Seward. In his letter to Seward, Tod stated that Olds was a “shrewd, cunning man, with capacity for great mischief, and should at once be put out of the way.”

=== Arrest ===
Olds was arrested by military authorities on August 12, 1862. He was confined at Fort Lafayette. He refused to take an oath of allegiance and was discharged on December 15, 1862. Olds was reputed to have said about Tod in one of his speeches: “the Governor would like to send the Democrats to the war, so as to keep them away from the polls, and retain Republicans at home, in order to save their votes for the party.”

Olds suffered from bouts of acute dysentery and was recuperating at the time of his arrest.

=== State legislature ===
While in prison, he was again elected a member of the Ohio House of Representatives. After his release from prison, Olds served in the house from 1862 to 1866. Following his retirement from political life, he resumed his various mercantile pursuits.

== Death and burial ==
Edson Baldwin Olds died in Lancaster, January 24, 1869, and was interred in Forest Cemetery at Circleville.

== Family ==
In 1824 Olds married Anna Maria Carolus. They had three sons, Mark Lafayette Olds (1828), a lawyer and Episcopalian minister of Christ Church in Washington, D.C.; Joseph Olds (1832), a lawyer and judge in Columbus, Ohio, and Edson Denny Olds (1834), a physician and surgeon in the Mexican Army; and three daughters, Rosalthe (1830), Mary (1836), and Lucy (1839). Another son and two daughters died in infancy. His brother was Chauncey N. Olds.

U.S. House of Representatives
Preceded by Thomas O. Edwards	Member of the U.S. House of Representatives from Ohio's 9th congressional district March 4, 1849–March 3, 1853	Succeeded by Frederick W. Green
Preceded by John Welch	Member of the U.S. House of Representatives from Ohio's 12th congressional district March 4, 1853–March 3, 1855	Succeeded by Samuel Galloway
