= Augustus L. Perrill =

American politician

Augustus Perrill

Member of the U.S. House of Representatives from Ohio's 9th district
- In office March 4, 1845 – March 3, 1847
- Preceded by: Elias Florence
- Succeeded by: Thomas O. Edwards

Member of the Ohio House of Representatives from the Pickaway County district
- In office December 2, 1839 - December 6, 1840
- Preceded by: T. J. Winship
- Succeeded by: Elias Florence
- In office January 1, 1866 - January 5, 1868
- Preceded by: James Reber
- Succeeded by: Ansel T. Walling

Member of the Ohio Senate from the 13th district
- In office January 4, 1858 - January 3, 1864
- Preceded by: Robert J. Corts
- Succeeded by: Ronald Nabowski

Personal details
- Born: Augustus Leonard Perrill; January 20, 1807 Moorefield, Virginia, U.S.
- Died: June 2, 1882 (aged 75) Circleville, Ohio, U.S.
- Resting place: Forest Cemetery
- Party: Democratic

Augustus Leonard Perrill (January 20, 1807 – June 2, 1882) was an American educator and law enforcement officer who served as a U.S. representative from Ohio for one term from 1845 to 1847.

== Early life and career ==
Born near Moorefield, Virginia (now West Virginia), Perrill moved to Ohio with his parents in 1816, who settled in Madison Township near Lithopolis, Ohio. He attended the local schools, and then taught school near Circleville, Ohio, and then engaged in agricultural pursuits. He was appointed deputy sheriff in January 1833.

=== Early political career ===
Perrill was elected sheriff in 1834 and served until 1837. He served as a member of the Ohio House of Representatives 1839-1841.

== Congress ==
Perrill was elected as a Democrat to the Twenty-ninth Congress (March 4, 1845 – March 3, 1847). He was an unsuccessful candidate for reelection in 1846 to the Thirtieth Congress.

== Later career ==
He resumed agricultural pursuits near Circleville. He served as a member of the Ohio Senate 1858-1863. He again served in the Ohio House of Representatives 1865-1867.

== Death ==
He died on his farm near Circleville June 2, 1882. He was interred in Forest Cemetery in Circleville.

U.S. House of Representatives
Preceded by Elias Florence	Member of the U.S. House of Representatives from Ohio's 9th congressional district March 4, 1845–March 3, 1847	Succeeded by Thomas O. Edwards
Ohio House of Representatives
Preceded by T. J. Winship	Representative from Pickaway County; December 2, 1839-December 6, 1840	Succeeded by Elias Florence
Preceded by James Reber	Representative from Pickaway County; January 1, 1866-January 5, 1868	Succeeded by Ansel T. Walling
Ohio Senate
Preceded by Alfred Kelly	Senator from 10th District; January 4, 1858-January 3, 1864	Succeeded by George L. Converse
