= Homer A. Ramey =

American lawyer and politician

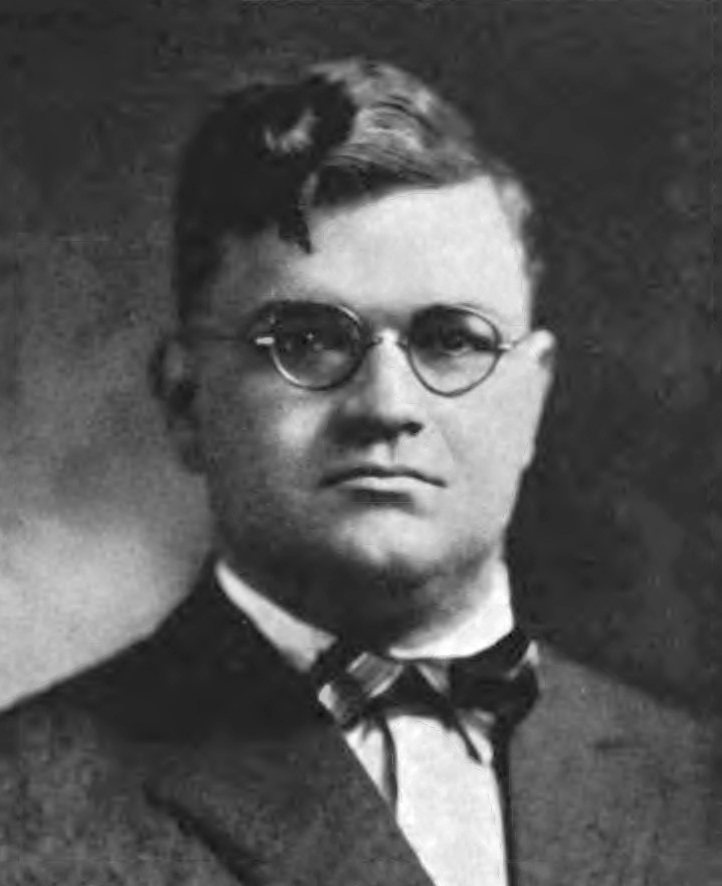

Member of the U.S. House of Representatives from Ohio's 9th district
- In office January 3, 1943 – January 3, 1949
- Preceded by: John F. Hunter
- Succeeded by: Thomas Henry Burke

Member of the Ohio Senate
- In office 1925–1926

Member of the Ohio House of Representatives
- In office 1920–1924

Personal details
- Born: Homer Alonzo Ramey; March 2, 1891 Sparta, Ohio, US
- Died: April 13, 1960 (aged 69) Toledo, Ohio, US
- Resting place: Ottawa Hills Memorial Park, Ottawa Hills, Ohio
- Party: Republican
- Spouse: Ruby Dearth
- Education: Park University; Ohio Northern University Pettit College of Law; Cincinnati Law School

Homer Alonzo Ramey (March 2, 1891 – April 13, 1960) was an American lawyer and politician who served three terms as a U.S. representative from Ohio from 1943 to 1949.

== Biography ==
He was born on a farm near Sparta, South Bloomfield Township, Ohio. His parents were Burt C. and Mae (Bockoven) Ramey. He attended the grade and high schools. He was graduated from Park College of Parkville, Missouri in 1913, and from the law school of Ohio Northern University at Ada in 1916. He attended Cincinnati Law School as a special student in 1917. He was admitted to the bar in 1917 and commenced practice in Put-in-Bay, Ohio.

== Political career ==
Ramey served as member of the State house of representatives from 1920 to 1924. He served in the Ohio Senate in 1925 and 1926. He served as judge of the municipal court of Toledo, Ohio from 1926 to 1943.

He was an unsuccessful candidate for election in 1938 to the Seventy-sixth Congress.

=== Congress ===
Ramey was elected as a Republican to the Seventy-eighth, Seventy-ninth, and Eightieth Congresses (January 3, 1943 – January 3, 1949).

He was an unsuccessful candidate for reelection in 1948 to the Eighty-first Congress and for election in 1950 to the Eighty-second Congress.

=== Later career and death ===
He was appointed in 1949 and subsequently elected judge of the municipal court of Toledo and served in that capacity until his death in Toledo, Ohio, on April 13, 1960.

He was interred in Ottawa Hills Memorial Park.

== Personal life ==
Ramey married Ruby Dearth on November 28, 1915. He was a member of Masons, Fraternal Order of Eagles, I.O.O.F., Modern Woodmen of America, and Jr. O.U.A.M.

== Electoral history ==
Year	Democratic	Republican	Other
1938	✓ John F. Hunter (Incumbent): 56,306	Homer A. Ramey: 55,441	(none)
1942	John F. Hunter (Incumbent): 44,027	✓ Homer A. Ramey: 47,377	(none)
1944	John F. Hunter: 77,693	✓ Homer A. Ramey (Incumbent): 82,735	(none)
1946	Michael DiSalle: 59,057	✓ Homer A. Ramey (Incumbent): 59,394	(none)
1948	✓ Thomas H. Burke: 85,409	Homer A. Ramey (Incumbent): 73,394	(none)
1950	Thomas H. Burke (Incumbent): 45,268	Homer A. Ramey: 43,301	✓ Frazier Reams (Independent): 51,024

== Sources ==
- United States Congress. "Homer A. Ramey (id: R000022)". Biographical Directory of the United States Congress.

U.S. House of Representatives
Preceded by John F. Hunter	Member of the U.S. House of Representatives from Ohio's 9th congressional district January 3, 1943-January 3, 1949	Succeeded by Thomas H. Burke
