= Thomas O. Edwards =

American politician

Thomas Owen Edwards

Member of the U.S. House of Representatives from Ohio's 9th district
- In office March 4, 1847 – March 3, 1849
- Preceded by: Augustus L. Perrill
- Succeeded by: Edson B. Olds

Personal details
- Born: March 29, 1810 Williamsburg, Indiana Territory
- Died: February 5, 1876 (aged 65) Wheeling, West Virginia, U.S.
- Resting place: Mount Wood Cemetery
- Party: Whig

Military service
- Allegiance: United States
- Branch/service: Union Army
- Rank: surgeon
- Unit: 3rd Iowa Infantry

Thomas Owen Edwards (March 29, 1810 – February 5, 1876) was a U.S. representative from Ohio for one term from 1847 to 1849.

== Biography ==
Born in Williamsburg, Indiana, Edwards completed preparatory studies. He studied medicine at the University of Maryland, Baltimore. He moved to Lancaster, Ohio, in 1836 and engaged in the practice of medicine.

Edwards was elected as a Whig to the Thirtieth Congress (March 4, 1847 – March 3, 1849). He was an unsuccessful candidate for reelection in 1848 to the Thirty-first Congress. He attended former President John Quincy Adams, who was then a Congressman, when he suffered a fatal stroke in the Hall of the House of Representatives. He served as inspector of marine hospitals. He moved to Cincinnati, Ohio, and engaged in the drug business. He served as member and president of the city council. Professor in the Ohio Medical College, Cincinnati, Ohio. He moved to Madison, Wisconsin, and thence to Dubuque, Iowa. During the Civil War served as surgeon in the 3rd Iowa Infantry|Third Regiment, Iowa Volunteer Infantry. He returned to Lancaster, Ohio, about 1870 and resumed the practice of medicine. He moved to Wheeling, West Virginia, in 1875 and continued the practice of his profession. He died in Wheeling, West Virginia, February 5, 1876. He was interred in Mount Wood Cemetery.

== Sources ==
- United States Congress. "Thomas O. Edwards (id: E000082)". Biographical Directory of the United States Congress.

U.S. House of Representatives
Preceded by Augustus L. Perrill	Member of the U.S. House of Representatives from Ohio's 9th congressional district March 4, 1847–March 3, 1849	Succeeded by Edson B. Olds
