= Thomas Henry Burke (politician) =

American politician

Thomas H. Burke

Member of the U.S. House of Representatives from Ohio's 9th district
- In office January 3, 1949 – January 3, 1951
- Preceded by: Homer A. Ramey
- Succeeded by: Frazier Reams

Member of the Ohio House of Representatives
- In office 1941–1942

Personal details
- Born: Thomas Henry Burke; May 6, 1904 Toledo, Ohio
- Died: September 12, 1959 (aged 55) Arlington, Virginia
- Resting place: Arlington National Cemetery
- Party: Democratic

Military service
- Allegiance: United States
- Branch/service: United States Navy
- Years of service: 1923–1927
- Rank: pharmacist's mate

Thomas Henry Burke (May 6, 1904 – September 12, 1959) was an American military veteran and politician who represented Ohio in the United States House of Representatives for one term from 1949 to 1951.

== Early life and career ==
Burke was born in Toledo, Ohio where he attended St. Patrick's grade school and St. John's College.

=== Naval service ===
After his formal education, he served in the United States Navy as a pharmacist's mate from 1923 to 1927 and in the Naval Fleet Reserve from 1927 to 1939. He worked for the Dana from 1928 to 1937 and was an official of United Automobile Workers Union from 1938 to 1948.

=== Early political career ===
Burke was a member of the Ohio House of Representatives in 1941 and 1942. He also served as a member of the Toledo City Council from 1944 to 1948. He was vice mayor of Toledo in 1948.

== Congress ==
Burke was elected as a Democrat to the Eighty-first Congress (January 3, 1949 – January 3, 1951) but was an unsuccessful candidate for reelection in 1950 to the Eighty-second Congress.

== Later career ==
After leaving Congress, he was a labor and manpower adviser in the National Production Authority in 1951. He was an unsuccessful candidate for election in 1952 to the Eighty-third Congress. He moved to Alexandria, Virginia and worked as a legislative representative for the United Automobile Workers' Union.

== Death ==
He died in Arlington, Virginia and was buried in Arlington National Cemetery.

== Electoral history ==
Year	Democratic	Republican	Other
1948	✓ Thomas H. Burke: 85,409	Homer A. Ramey (Incumbent): 73,394	(none)
1950	Thomas H. Burke (Incumbent): 45,268	Homer A. Ramey: 43,301	✓ Frazier Reams (Independent): 51,024
1952	Thomas H. Burke: 61,047	Gilmore Flues: 46,989	✓ Frazier Reams (Independent, Incumbent): 74,821

U.S. House of Representatives
Preceded by Homer A. Ramey	Member of the U.S. House of Representatives from Ohio's 9th congressional district January 3, 1949 – January 3, 1951	Succeeded by Frazier Reams
