= John S. Jones =

American politician

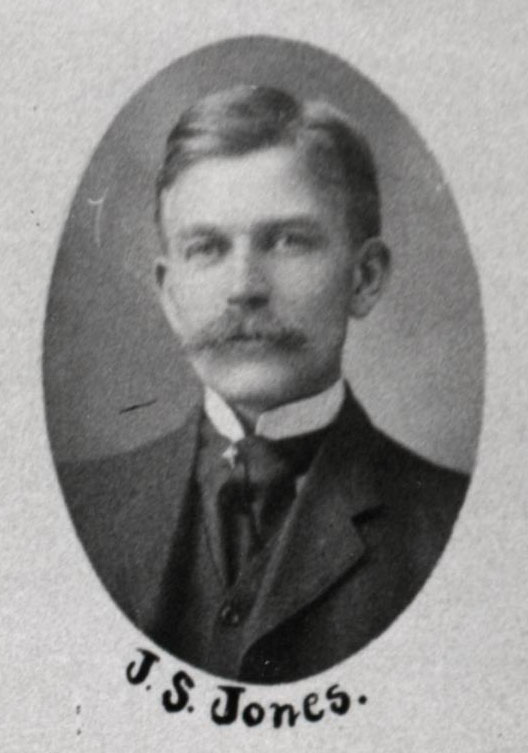

Member of the U.S. House of Representatives from Ohio's 9th district
- In office March 4, 1877 – March 3, 1879
- Preceded by: Earley F. Poppleton
- Succeeded by: George L. Converse

Member of the Ohio House of Representatives from the Delaware County district
- In office January 4, 1880 – January 6, 1884
- Preceded by: David H. Elliott
- Succeeded by: George L. Sackett

Personal details
- Born: John Sills Jones; February 12, 1836 Champaign County, Ohio, U.S.
- Died: April 11, 1903 (aged 67) Delaware, Ohio, U.S.
- Resting place: Oak Grove Cemetery, Delaware, Ohio
- Party: Republican
- Education: Ohio Wesleyan University

Military service
- Allegiance: United States of America
- Branch/service: United States Army; Union Army
- Years of service: 1861–1865
- Rank: Colonel; Brevet Brigadier General
- Unit: 4th Ohio Infantry Regiment
- Commands: 174th Ohio Infantry Regiment
- Battles/wars: American Civil War

John Sills Jones (February 12, 1836 – April 11, 1903) was a one-term 19th-century U.S. Representative from Ohio who also served as an officer in the Union Army during the American Civil War.

== Biography ==
Jones was born near St. Paris, Champaign County, Ohio, where he attended the public schools. Studying law he graduated from Ohio Wesleyan University, Delaware, Ohio, in 1855. He was admitted to the bar in 1857 and commenced practice in Delaware, Ohio; where he served as prosecuting attorney for Delaware County in 1860 and 1861.

=== Civil War ===
Wanting to serve in the Civil War he was commissioned a First Lieutenant in the 4th Ohio Infantry Regiment in 1861. After 3 years he reenlisted, and in September 1864 he was given command of the 174th Ohio Infantry Regiment with the rank of colonel. Jones was mustered out with his regiment on July 7, 1865, and received a brevet promotion to brigadier general on June 27.

=== Career after the war ===
Jones afterwards resumed the practice of law. In 1866 he served as mayor of Delaware, Ohio, and afterwards became prosecuting attorney again until 1872.

=== Congress ===
He was elected as a Republican to the Forty-fifth Congress (March 4, 1877 – March 3, 1879) and served as a member of the State house of representatives (1879–1884).

=== Death and burial ===
Jones died on April 11, 1903, and was interred in Oak Grove Cemetery.

== See also ==
U.S. House of Representatives
Preceded by Earley F. Poppleton	Member of the U.S. House of Representatives from Ohio's 9th congressional district March 4, 1877 – March 3, 1879	Succeeded by George L. Converse
