= 174th Ohio Infantry Regiment =

- Active: August 16, 1864, to June 28, 1865
- Country: United States
- Allegiance: Union
- Branch: Infantry
- Engagements: Battle of Overall's Creek; Third Battle of Murfreesboro; Battle of Wyse Fork

The 174th Ohio Infantry Regiment, sometimes 174th Ohio Volunteer Infantry (or 174th OVI) was an infantry regiment in the Union Army during the American Civil War.

== Service ==
The 174th Ohio Infantry was organized at Camp Chase in Columbus, Ohio August 16 through September 21, 1864, and mustered in for one year service on September 21, 1864, under the command of Colonel John Sills Jones.

The regiment was attached to Post of Murfreesboro, Tennessee, Department of the Cumberland, to October 1864. District of North Alabama, Department of the Cumberland, to December 1864. 3rd Brigade, 1st Division, XXIII Corps, Army of the Ohio, to February 1865, and Department of North Carolina to June 1865.

The 174th Ohio Infantry mustered out of service June 28, 1865, at Charlotte, North Carolina.

== Detailed service ==
Left Ohio for Nashville, Tenn., September 23, arriving there September 26. Moved to Murfreesboro, Tenn., and duty in the defenses of that city until October 27. Moved from Murfreesboro to Decatur, Ala., October 27. Defense of Decatur October 27–29. Moved to Elk River October 29 (four companies detached at Athens, Alabama). Returned to Decatur November 1 and duty there until November 25. Moved to Murfreesboro November 25. Action at Overall's Creek December 4. Siege of Murfreesboro December 5–12. Wilkinson's Pike, near Murfreesboro, December 7. Ordered to Clifton, Tenn., and duty there until January 17, 1865. Movement to Washington, D.C., January 17–29, and duty there until February 21. Moved to Fort Fisher, N.C., February 21–23, to Morehead City February 24, and to New Berne February 25. Advance on Kingston and Goldsboro March 6–21. Battle of Wise's Forks March 8–10. Occupation of Kinston March 14, and of Goldsboro March 21. Advance on Raleigh April 10–14. Occupation of Raleigh April 14. Bennett's House April 26. Surrender of Johnston and his army. Duty at Raleigh and Charlotte, N.C., until June.

== Casualties ==
The regiment lost a total of 117 men during service; 1 officer and 21 enlisted men killed or mortally wounded, 1 officer and 94 enlisted men due to disease.

== Commanders ==
- Colonel John Sills Jones

== Notable members ==
- Colonel John Sills Jones - U.S. Representative from Ohio, 1877-1879

== See also ==
- List of Ohio Civil War units
- Ohio in the Civil War
