= Ohio's 9th congressional district =

U.S. House district for Ohio

- Interactive map of district boundaries
- Representative: Marcy Kaptur; D–Toledo
- Distribution: 86.02% urban; 13.98% rural
- Population (2025): 775,977
- Median household income: $69,512
- Ethnicity: 74.5% White; 12.0% Black; 7.2% Hispanic; 4.4% Two or more races; 1.3% Asian; 0.6% other
- Cook PVI: R+5

Ohio's 9th congressional district has been represented by Representative Marcy Kaptur (D) since 1983.

This district is located in the northwestern part of the state, bordering Michigan, Indiana, and Ontario, Canada (via Lake Erie), and includes all of Defiance, Williams, Fulton, Lucas, Ottawa, Sandusky, and Erie counties, and a portion of northern Wood County.

The previous iteration of the 9th district stretched along Lake Erie from Toledo to Cleveland, and was called "The Snake by the Lake" due to its long and skinny appearance on the map. The two parts of the district were connected only via the Thomas Edison Memorial Bridge between Erie and Ottawa counties, as well as Crane Creek State Park. Some Ohio Democrats argued that when the beach flooded, the district was not contiguous.

It was one of several districts challenged in a 2018 lawsuit seeking to overturn Ohio's congressional map as unconstitutional gerrymandering. According to the lawsuit, the 9th "eats its way across the southern border of Lake Erie" while fragmenting Cleveland and Toledo. In 2019, the Supreme Court refused to hear the case, meaning that Ohio's congressional districts, including District 9, would not need to be redrawn.

The district was one of 13 congressional districts that voted for Donald Trump in the 2024 presidential election while simultaneously electing a Democrat in the 2024 House of Representatives elections.

== Recent election results from statewide races ==
=== 2023-2027 boundaries ===
Year	Office	Results
2008	President	Obama 58% - 40%
2012	President	Obama 59% - 41%
2016	President	Trump 48% - 47%
2016	Senate	Portman 54% - 41%
2018	Senate	Brown 58% - 42%
2018	Governor	Cordray 50% - 46%
2018	Attorney General	Dettelbach 52% - 48%
2020	President	Trump 51% - 48%
2022	Senate	Ryan 50.2% - 49.8%
2022	Governor	DeWine 63% - 37%
2022	Secretary of State	LaRose 57% - 41%
2022	Treasurer	Sprague 56% - 44%
2022	Auditor	Faber 57% - 43%
2022	Attorney General	Yost 58% - 42%
2024	President	Trump 53% - 46%
2024	Senate	Brown 48% - 47%

=== 2027–2033 boundaries ===
Year	Office	Results
2008	President	Obama 56% - 42%
2012	President	Obama 56% - 44%
2016	President	Trump 50% - 45%
2016	Senate	Portman 56% - 39%
2018	Senate	Brown 57% - 43%
2018	Governor	DeWine 48.4% - 48.1%
2018	Attorney General	Yost 50.3% - 49.7%
2020	President	Trump 52% - 46%
2022	Senate	Vance 52% - 48%
2022	Governor	DeWine 65% - 35%
2022	Secretary of State	LaRose 58% - 40%
2022	Treasurer	Sprague 58% - 42%
2022	Auditor	Faber 59% - 41%
2022	Attorney General	Yost 60% - 40%
2024	President	Trump 55% - 44%
2024	Senate	Moreno 50% - 46%

== Composition ==
For the 118th and successive Congresses (based on redistricting following the 2020 census), the district contains all or portions of the following counties, townships, and municipalities:

Defiance County (16)

All 16 townships and municipalities

Erie County (18)

All 18 townships and municipalities

Fulton County (10)

All 10 townships and municipalities

Lucas County (22)

All 22 townships and municipalities

Ottawa County (20)

All 20 townships and municipalities

Sandusky County (22)

All 22 townships and municipalities

Williams County (21)

All 21 townships and municipalities

Wood County (8)

Lake Township, Middleton Township (part; also 5th), Millbury, Northwood, Perrysburg, Perrysburg Township, Rossford, Walbridge

== List of members representing the district ==
Member	Party	Years	Cong ress	Electoral history	Counties represented
District established March 4, 1823
Philemon Beecher (Lancaster)	Adams-Clay; Democratic- Republican	March 4, 1823 – March 3, 1825	18th 19th 20th	Elected in 1822. Re-elected in 1824. Re-elected in 1826. Lost re-election.	
Philemon Beecher (Lancaster)	Anti-Jacksonian	March 4, 1825 – March 3, 1829	18th 19th 20th	Elected in 1822. Re-elected in 1824. Re-elected in 1826. Lost re-election.	
William W. Irvin (Lancaster)	Jacksonian	March 4, 1829 – March 3, 1833	21st 22nd	Elected in 1828. Re-elected in 1830. [data missing]	
John Chaney (Courtwright)	Jacksonian	March 4, 1833 – March 3, 1837	23rd 24th 25th	Elected in 1832. Re-elected in 1834. Re-elected in 1836. [data missing]	
John Chaney (Courtwright)	Democratic	March 4, 1837 – March 3, 1839	23rd 24th 25th	Elected in 1832. Re-elected in 1834. Re-elected in 1836. [data missing]	
William Medill (Lancaster)	Democratic	March 4, 1839 – March 3, 1843	26th 27th	Elected in 1838. Re-elected in 1840. [data missing]	
Elias Florence (Circleville)	Whig	March 4, 1843 – March 3, 1845	28th	Elected in 1843. [data missing]	
Augustus L. Perrill (Lithopolis)	Democratic	March 4, 1845 – March 3, 1847	29th	Elected in 1844. [data missing]	
Thomas O. Edwards (Lancaster)	Whig	March 4, 1847 – March 3, 1849	30th	Elected in 1846. [data missing]	
Edson B. Olds (Circleville)	Democratic	March 4, 1849 – March 3, 1853	31st 32nd	Elected in 1848. Re-elected in 1850. Redistricted to the 12th district.	
Frederick W. Green (Tiffin)	Democratic	March 4, 1853 – March 3, 1855	33rd	Redistricted from the 6th district and re-elected in 1852. [data missing]	
Cooper K. Watson (Tiffin)	Anti-Nebraska	March 4, 1855 – March 3, 1857	34th	Elected in 1854. [data missing]	
Lawrence W. Hall (Bucyrus)	Democratic	March 4, 1857 – March 3, 1859	35th	Elected in 1856. [data missing]	
John Carey (Carey)	Republican	March 4, 1859 – March 3, 1861	36th	Elected in 1858. [data missing]	
Warren P. Noble (Tiffin)	Democratic	March 4, 1861 – March 3, 1865	37th 38th	Elected in 1860. Re-elected in 1862. [data missing]	
Ralph P. Buckland (Fremont)	Republican	March 4, 1865 – March 3, 1869	39th 40th	Elected in 1864. Re-elected in 1866. [data missing]	
Edward F. Dickinson (Fremont)	Democratic	March 4, 1869 – March 3, 1871	41st	Elected in 1868. [data missing]	
Charles Foster (Fostoria)	Republican	March 4, 1871 – March 3, 1873	42nd	Elected in 1870. Redistricted to the 10th district.	
James W. Robinson (Marysville)	Republican	March 4, 1873 – March 3, 1875	43rd	Elected in 1872. [data missing]	
Earley F. Poppleton (Delaware)	Democratic	March 4, 1875 – March 3, 1877	44th	Elected in 1874. [data missing]	
John S. Jones (Delaware)	Republican	March 4, 1877 – March 3, 1879	45th	Elected in 1876. [data missing]	
George L. Converse (Columbus)	Democratic	March 4, 1879 – March 3, 1881	46th	Elected in 1878. Redistricted to the 12th district.	
James S. Robinson (Kenton)	Republican	March 4, 1881 – January 12, 1885	47th 48th	Elected in 1880. Re-elected in 1882. Resigned to become Ohio Secretary of State.	
Vacant		January 12, 1885 – March 3, 1885	48th		
William C. Cooper (Mount Vernon)	Republican	March 4, 1885 – March 3, 1891	49th 50th 51st	Elected in 1884. Re-elected in 1886. Re-elected in 1888. [data missing]	
Joseph H. Outhwaite (Columbus)	Democratic	March 4, 1891 – March 3, 1893	52nd	Redistricted from the 13th district and re-elected in 1890. Redistricted to the 12th district.	
Byron F. Ritchie (Toledo)	Democratic	March 4, 1893 – March 3, 1895	53rd	Elected in 1892. [data missing]	
James H. Southard (Toledo)	Republican	March 4, 1895 – March 3, 1907	54th 55th 56th 57th 58th 59th	Elected in 1894. Re-elected in 1896. Re-elected in 1898. Re-elected in 1900. Re-elected in 1902. Re-elected in 1904. [data missing]	
Isaac R. Sherwood (Toledo)	Democratic	March 4, 1907 – March 3, 1921	60th 61st 62nd 63rd 64th 65th 66th	Elected in 1906. Re-elected in 1908. Re-elected in 1910; Re-elected in 1912. Re-elected in 1914. Re-elected in 1916. Re-elected in 1918. Lost re-election.	
William W. Chalmers (Toledo)	Republican	March 4, 1921 – March 3, 1923	67th	Elected in 1920. Lost re-election.	
Isaac R. Sherwood (Toledo)	Democratic	March 4, 1923 – March 3, 1925	68th	Elected in 1922. Lost re-election.	
William W. Chalmers (Toledo)	Republican	March 4, 1925 – March 3, 1931	69th 70th 71st	Elected in 1924. Re-elected in 1926. Re-elected in 1928. Lost renomination.	
Wilbur M. White (Toledo)	Republican	March 4, 1931 – March 3, 1933	72nd	Elected in 1930. Lost re-election.	
Warren J. Duffey (Toledo)	Democratic	March 4, 1933 – July 7, 1936	73rd 74th	Elected in 1932. Re-elected in 1934. Died.	
Vacant		July 7, 1936 – January 3, 1937	74th		
John F. Hunter (Toledo)	Democratic	January 3, 1937 – January 3, 1943	75th 76th 77th	Elected in 1936. Re-elected in 1938. Re-elected in 1940. Lost re-election.	
Homer A. Ramey (Toledo)	Republican	January 3, 1943 – January 3, 1949	78th 79th 80th	Elected in 1942. Re-elected in 1944. Re-elected in 1946. Lost re-election.	
Thomas Henry Burke (Toledo)	Democratic	January 3, 1949 – January 3, 1951	81st	Elected in 1948. Lost re-election.	
Frazier Reams (Toledo)	Independent	January 3, 1951 – January 3, 1955	82nd 83rd	Elected in 1950. Re-elected in 1952. Lost re-election.	
Thomas L. Ashley (Maumee)	Democratic	January 3, 1955 – January 3, 1981	84th 85th 86th 87th 88th 89th 90th 91st 92nd 93rd 94th 95th 96th	Elected in 1954. Re-elected in 1956. Re-elected in 1958. Re-elected in 1960. Re-elected in 1962. Re-elected in 1964. Re-elected in 1966. Re-elected in 1968. Re-elected in 1970. Re-elected in 1972. Re-elected in 1974. Re-elected in 1976. Re-elected in 1978. Lost re-election.	
Ed Weber (Toledo)	Republican	January 3, 1981 – January 3, 1983	97th	Elected in 1980. Lost re-election.	
Marcy Kaptur (Toledo)	Democratic	January 3, 1983 – present	98th 99th 100th 101st 102nd 103rd 104th 105th 106th 107th 108th 109th 110th 111th 112th 113th 114th 115th 116th 117th 118th 119th	Elected in 1982. Re-elected in 1984. Re-elected in 1986. Re-elected in 1988. Re-elected in 1990. Re-elected in 1992. Re-elected in 1994. Re-elected in 1996. Re-elected in 1998. Re-elected in 2000. Re-elected in 2002. Re-elected in 2004. Re-elected in 2006. Re-elected in 2008. Re-elected in 2010. Re-elected in 2012. Re-elected in 2014. Re-elected in 2016. Re-elected in 2018. Re-elected in 2020. Re-elected in 2022. Re-elected in 2024. Re-elected in 2026.	
Marcy Kaptur (Toledo)	Democratic	January 3, 1983 – present	98th 99th 100th 101st 102nd 103rd 104th 105th 106th 107th 108th 109th 110th 111th 112th 113th 114th 115th 116th 117th 118th 119th	Elected in 1982. Re-elected in 1984. Re-elected in 1986. Re-elected in 1988. Re-elected in 1990. Re-elected in 1992. Re-elected in 1994. Re-elected in 1996. Re-elected in 1998. Re-elected in 2000. Re-elected in 2002. Re-elected in 2004. Re-elected in 2006. Re-elected in 2008. Re-elected in 2010. Re-elected in 2012. Re-elected in 2014. Re-elected in 2016. Re-elected in 2018. Re-elected in 2020. Re-elected in 2022. Re-elected in 2024. Re-elected in 2026.	2003–2013
Marcy Kaptur (Toledo)	Democratic	January 3, 1983 – present	98th 99th 100th 101st 102nd 103rd 104th 105th 106th 107th 108th 109th 110th 111th 112th 113th 114th 115th 116th 117th 118th 119th	Elected in 1982. Re-elected in 1984. Re-elected in 1986. Re-elected in 1988. Re-elected in 1990. Re-elected in 1992. Re-elected in 1994. Re-elected in 1996. Re-elected in 1998. Re-elected in 2000. Re-elected in 2002. Re-elected in 2004. Re-elected in 2006. Re-elected in 2008. Re-elected in 2010. Re-elected in 2012. Re-elected in 2014. Re-elected in 2016. Re-elected in 2018. Re-elected in 2020. Re-elected in 2022. Re-elected in 2024. Re-elected in 2026.	2013–2023
Marcy Kaptur (Toledo)	Democratic	January 3, 1983 – present	98th 99th 100th 101st 102nd 103rd 104th 105th 106th 107th 108th 109th 110th 111th 112th 113th 114th 115th 116th 117th 118th 119th	Elected in 1982. Re-elected in 1984. Re-elected in 1986. Re-elected in 1988. Re-elected in 1990. Re-elected in 1992. Re-elected in 1994. Re-elected in 1996. Re-elected in 1998. Re-elected in 2000. Re-elected in 2002. Re-elected in 2004. Re-elected in 2006. Re-elected in 2008. Re-elected in 2010. Re-elected in 2012. Re-elected in 2014. Re-elected in 2016. Re-elected in 2018. Re-elected in 2020. Re-elected in 2022. Re-elected in 2024. Re-elected in 2026.	2023–2027

== Election results ==
The following chart shows historic election results. Bold type indicates victor. Italic type indicates incumbent.

Year	Democratic	Republican	Other
1920	Isaac R. Sherwood: 38,292	✓ **William W. Chalmers** (Incumbent): 49,732	Karl E. Pauli: 47
1922	✓ Isaac R. Sherwood: 45,059	William W. Chalmers (Incumbent): 42,712	(none)
1924	Isaac R. Sherwood (Incumbent): 48,482	✓ William W. Chalmers: 54,792	Millard Price (Prohibition): 2,159; John Kocinski: 747
1926	C. W. Davis: 23,947	✓ **William W. Chalmers** (Incumbent): 47,331	George F. Parrish (TRI): 1,110; Millard Price (Socialist): 1,018
1928	William P. Clarke: 50,601	✓ **William W. Chalmers** (Incumbent): 82,560	Charles V. Stephenson (Workers): 190
1930	Scott Stahl: 36,375	✓ Wilbur M. White: 49,498	(none)
1932	✓ Warren J. Duffey: 56,755	Wilbur M. White (Incumbent): 54,078	Silas E. Hurin: 4,200; Clyde E. Kiker: 2,135; Karl Pauli (Socialist): 1,314; Eugene Stoll (Communist): 620
1934	✓ **Warren J. Duffey** (Incumbent): 61,037	Frank L. Mulholland: 35,732	Kenneth Eggert (Communist): 684; Karl Pauli (Socialist): 510
1936	✓ John F. Hunter: 75,737	Raymond E. Hildebrand: 55,043	Earl O. Lehman: 3,739
1938	✓ **John F. Hunter** (Incumbent): 56,306	Homer A. Ramey: 55,441	(none)
1940	✓ **John F. Hunter** (Incumbent): 86,956	Wilbur M. White: 71,927	(none)
1942	John F. Hunter (Incumbent): 44,027	✓ Homer A. Ramey: 47,377	(none)
1944	John F. Hunter: 77,693	✓ **Homer A. Ramey** (Incumbent): 82,735	(none)
1946	Michael DiSalle: 59,057	✓ **Homer A. Ramey** (Incumbent): 59,394	(none)
1948	✓ Thomas H. Burke: 85,409	Homer A. Ramey (Incumbent): 73,394	(none)
1950	Thomas H. Burke (Incumbent): 45,268	Homer A. Ramey: 43,301	✓ **Frazier Reams** (Independent): 51,024
1952	Thomas H. Burke: 61,047	Gilmore Flues: 46,989	✓ **Frazier Reams** (Independent, Incumbent): 74,821
1954	✓ Thomas L. Ashley: 48,471	Irving C. Reynolds: 39,933	Frazier Reams (Independent, Incumbent): 44,656
1956	✓ **Thomas L. Ashley** (Incumbent):	Harvey G. Straub: 81,562	(none)
1958	✓ **Thomas L. Ashley** (Incumbent): 102,115	William K. Gernheuser: 63,660	(none)
1960	✓ **Thomas L. Ashley** (Incumbent): 108,688	Howard C. Cook: 82,433	(none)
1962	✓ **Thomas L. Ashley** (Incumbent): 86,443	Martin A. Janis: 64,279	(none)
1964	✓ **Thomas L. Ashley** (Incumbent): 109,167	John O. Celusta: 64,401	(none)
1966	✓ **Thomas L. Ashley** (Incumbent): 83,261	Jane M. Kuebbeler: 53,777	(none)
1968	✓ **Thomas L. Ashley** (Incumbent): 85,280	Ben Marsh: 63,290	(none)
1970	✓ **Thomas L. Ashley** (Incumbent): 82,777	Allen H. Shapiro: 33,947	(none)
1972	✓ **Thomas L. Ashley** (Incumbent): 110,450	Joseph C. Richards: 49,388	(none)
1974	✓ **Thomas L. Ashley** (Incumbent): 64,831	Carty Finkbeiner: 57,892	(none)
1976	✓ **Thomas L. Ashley** (Incumbent): 91,040	Carty Finkbeiner: 73,919	Edward S. Emery: 1,533; Lynn Galonsky: 1,477
1978	✓ **Thomas L. Ashley** (Incumbent): 71,709	John C. Hoyt: 34,326	Edward S. Emery: 2,563; Michael James Lewinski: 4,530
1980	Thomas L. Ashley (Incumbent): 68,728	✓ Ed Weber: 96,927	Edward S. Emery: 4,357; Toby Elizabeth Emmerich: 2,411
1982	✓ Marcy Kaptur: 95,162	Ed Weber (Incumbent): 64,459	David Muir (Libertarian): 1,217; Susan A. Skinner: 1,785; James J. Somers: 1,594
1984	✓ **Marcy Kaptur** (Incumbent): 117,985	Frank Venner: 93,210	Other: 3,714
1986	✓ **Marcy Kaptur** (Incumbent): 105,646	Mike Shufeldt: 30,643	(none)
1988	✓ **Marcy Kaptur** (Incumbent): 157,557	Al Hawkins: 36,183	(none)
1990	✓ **Marcy Kaptur** (Incumbent): 117,681	Jerry D. Lammers: 33,791	(none)
1992	✓ **Marcy Kaptur** (Incumbent): 178,879	Ken D. Brown: 53,011	Edward Howard: 11,162
1994	✓ **Marcy Kaptur** (Incumbent): 118,120	R. Randy Whitman: 38,665	(none)
1996	✓ **Marcy Kaptur** (Incumbent): 170,617	R. Randy Whitman: 46,040	Elizabeth A. Slotnick (Natural Law): 4,677
1998	✓ **Marcy Kaptur** (Incumbent): 130,793	Edward S. Emery: 30,312	(none)
2000	✓ **Marcy Kaptur** (Incumbent): 168,547	Dwight E. Bryan: 49,446	Galen Fries (Libertarian): 4,239; Dennis Slotnick (Natural Law): 3,096
2002	✓ **Marcy Kaptur** (Incumbent): 132,236	Edward S. Emery: 46,481	(none)
2004	✓ **Marcy Kaptur** (Incumbent): 199,528	Larry A. Kaczala: 93,930	(none)
2006	✓ **Marcy Kaptur** (Incumbent): 153,880	Brad Leavitt: 55,119	(none)
2008	✓ **Marcy Kaptur** (Incumbent): 210,822	Brad Leavitt: 73,610	(none)
2010	✓ **Marcy Kaptur** (Incumbent): 121,819	Rich Iott: 83,423	(none)
2012	✓ **Marcy Kaptur** (Incumbent): 217,775	Joe Wurzelbacher: 68,666	Sean Stipe (Libertarian): 11,725
2014	✓ **Marcy Kaptur** (Incumbent): 106,338	Richard May: 50,792	Cory Hoffman (Write-in): 112; George A. Skalsky (Write-in): 29
2016	✓ **Marcy Kaptur** (Incumbent): 193,966	Donald P. Larson: 88,427	George A. Skalsky (Write-in): 5
2018	✓ **Marcy Kaptur** (Incumbent): 157,219	Steve Kraus: 74,670	McKenzie Levindofske (Write-in): 48
2020	✓ **Marcy Kaptur** (Incumbent): 190,328	Rob Weber: 111,385	McKenzie Levindofske (Write-in): 39
2022	✓ **Marcy Kaptur** (Incumbent): 150,655	J.R. Majewski: 115,362	(none)
2024	✓ **Marcy Kaptur** (Incumbent): 181,098	Derek Merrin: 178,716	Tom Pruss (Libertarian): 15,381

== See also ==
- Ohio's congressional districts
- List of United States congressional districts
