= Frazier Reams =

American politician

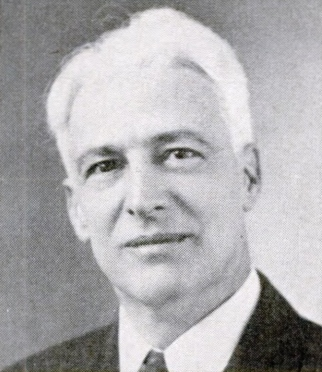

Member of the U.S. House of Representatives from Ohio's 9th district
- In office January 3, 1951 – January 3, 1955
- Preceded by: Thomas Henry Burke
- Succeeded by: Thomas L. Ashley

Personal details
- Born: Henry Frazier Reams; January 15, 1897 Franklin, Tennessee, U.S.
- Died: September 15, 1971 (aged 74) Oakland, California, U.S.
- Resting place: Woodlawn Cemetery
- Party: Independent
- Relations: Frazier Reams Jr. (son)
- Education: University of Tennessee; Vanderbilt University Law School

Military service
- Allegiance: United States
- Branch/service: United States Army
- Years of service: 1918–1919
- Rank: Lieutenant
- Battles/wars: World War I

Henry Frazier Reams Sr. (January 15, 1897 – September 15, 1971) was an American lawyer and politician of the United States Democratic Party from Toledo, Ohio. He served two terms as a U.S. Congressman from Ohio from 1951 to 1955.

== Life and career ==
Reams was born in Franklin, Tennessee in 1897. His father was a Methodist minister.

=== Military service ===
Reams served in the United States Army, with the 58th Field Artillery, during World War I, in 1918–1919. He was discharged at the rank of lieutenant.

=== Education and early career ===
After the war, Reams finished his degree at the University of Tennessee at Knoxville, earning a bachelor's degree in 1919. In 1922, he received a law degree from Vanderbilt University.

In 1920, Reams was licensed to practice law in Tennessee. In 1922, he moved to Toledo, Ohio, where his brother Glenn was a medical resident at the Toledo Hospital. Reams was admitted to the bar and practiced law with the firm Tracy, Chapman & Welles. He practiced as a lawyer while participating in Democratic politics, serving as a delegate to the Democratic National Convention in 1928, 1932, 1936, 1940, 1944, 1948, and 1956.

From 1933 to 1937, Reams served as prosecutor of Lucas County, Ohio. During this time, Reams led a campaign to clean up Toledo and rid the city of the many gangsters and bootleggers who resided and did business there. Reams was most well known for leading the prosecution of Thomas "Yonnie" Licavoli, who controlled bootlegging and illegal gambling operations in Detroit, Michigan and Toledo. Licavoli was sentenced to life in prison and served 37 years at Ohio Penitentiary starting in 1934. Gov. Martin L. Davey appointed Reams to investigate easy prison conditions and Reams' investigation of the luxuries that Licavoli was enjoying at Ohio Penitentiary resulted in the dismissal of the warden.

In 1935, Reams got into a public dispute with Lucas County Common Pleas Court Judge Roy R. Stuart. A grand jury convened by County Prosecutor Reams had issued indictments of two brothers of Toledo Mayor Addison Q. Thacher, a Republican, on charges related to welfare payments and bank closings. Judge Stuart ordered the dismissal of the grand jury and Reams filed an "affidavit of prejudice," which prevented Stuart from hearing any criminal matter until the accusation of prejudice could be heard.

In 1936, Reams sought the Democratic nomination for the office of Ohio Attorney General, but he lost to Herbert S. Duffy.

In 1937, Reams formed the law firm Reams, Bretherton & Neipp. His partners were Thomas A. Bretherton and Morton Neipp, both of whom had worked for him in the prosecutor's office.

=== Radio business ===
In 1938, Reams founded Toledo's second radio station, WTOL, with the help from Henry L. Thompson, who believed in his vision. He added an FM sister in 1949, WTOL-FM. In 1957, he signed on Toledo's second television station, WTOL-TV. He sold the television station in 1966, but his family kept the radio stations well into the 1990s.

From 1939 to 1945 he served on the Toledo Port Commission. From 1942 to 1944, he was collector of internal revenue.

=== Congress ===
In 1944, Reams sought the Democratic nomination for Governor of Ohio, but he placed fourth in the contest that was won by Frank Lausche. Once Lausche won the governorship, he appointed Reams to the office of state director of public welfare, where Reams served from 1945 to 1946.

In 1950, Reams, according to his New York Times obituary, split with the Democratic organization in Toledo and was elected to the U.S. House of Representatives as an independent. He served in the House from 1951 to 1955, during the 82nd and 83rd Congresses, and represented the ninth congressional district of Ohio. However, in 1954, Reams was unsuccessful in his bid for a third term in Congress, losing his seat to a fellow Democrat, Thomas Ludlow Ashley.

In 1951, Reams served as a delegate to the Council of Europe. In 1953 and 1954, he was a delegate to the Interparliamentary Union Conference.

=== Other affiliations ===
From 1937 to 1960, Reams served on the board of the Community Broadcasting Co. (the operator of WTOL and WCWA radio and WTOL TV), which he had founded in 1928. In 1955, Reams was one of the founding directors of the Toledo-Lucas County Port Authority. From 1948 to 1957, he was a trustee of Bowling Green State University. From 1965 until his death, he was chairman of the board of Reams Broadcasting Corp.

=== Retirement and death ===
After his retirement, Reams moved to San Mateo, California. He died in Oakland, California in 1971 and was buried in the Woodlawn Cemetery (Toledo, Ohio).

Reams's son, Frazier Reams Jr., was the Democratic nominee for Ohio governor in 1966.

== Election history ==
Year	Democratic	Republican	Other
1950	Thomas H. Burke (Incumbent): 45,268	Homer A. Ramey: 43,301	✓ Frazier Reams (Independent): 51,024
1952	Thomas H. Burke: 61,047	Gilmore Flues: 46,989	✓ Frazier Reams (Independent, Incumbent): 74,821
1954	✓ Thomas L. Ashley: 48,471	Irving C. Reynolds: 39,933	Frazier Reams (Independent, Incumbent): 44,656

== See also ==
- Ohio's 9th congressional district
- Ohio gubernatorial elections

== Sources ==
- United States Congress. "Frazier Reams (id: R000100)". Biographical Directory of the United States Congress.

U.S. House of Representatives
Preceded by Thomas H. Burke	Member of the U.S. House of Representatives from Ohio's 9th congressional district January 3, 1951 – January 3, 1955	Succeeded by Thomas L. Ashley
