= Ohio Department of Aging =

Department of Aging
Cabinet Level Agency overview
- Formed: June 26, 1984
- Preceding agencies: Ohio Commission on Aging; Ohio Division of Administration on Aging
- Jurisdiction: Ohio
- Headquarters: 30 E. Broad Street/22nd Floor, Columbus, OH 43215
- Cabinet Level Agency executive: Ursel J. McElroy, Director
- Website: www.aging.ohio.gov

The Ohio Department of Aging is the administrative department of the Ohio state government responsible for delivery of services and support that improve and promote quality of life and personal choice for older Ohioans, adults with disabilities, their families and their caregivers. The director of the department is the chief advisor to the Governor concerning issues affecting older Ohioans and policy changes at the federal Administration on Aging.

== History ==
In 1966, Ohio established the Division of Administration on Aging, the predecessor to the Department of Aging, within the Department of Mental Hygiene and Corrections. On June 26, 1984, the Ohio Commission on Aging attained full departmental status and became the Ohio Department of Aging.

== Director ==
Governor Mike DeWine appointed Ursel McElroy as his nominee to lead the Ohio Department of Aging on January 10, 2019.

== Mission and Programs ==
The department's mission is to provide leadership for the delivery of services and supports that improve and promote quality of life and personal choice for older Ohioans, adults with disabilities, their families and their caregivers. Perhaps their best-known program is the popular Golden Buckeye program. The department administers Medicaid waiver programs that allow older adults on Medicaid to receive the care they need in settings other than nursing homes, such as the PASSPORT home care and Assisted Living Waiver programs. They also administer programs funded by the federal Older Americans Act, such as nutrition and transportation services for older adults, healthy lifestyle program, the civic engagement initiative and more.

With a few exceptions, the department does not provide direct services to Ohioans. Rather, services are coordinated and managed by a network of 12 area agencies on aging. The area agencies screen potential clients, recruit service providers and more. The department monitors the area agencies for fiscal and program compliance.
