= Golden Buckeye =

The Golden Buckeye program is a free service of the Ohio Department of Aging. Ohio citizens age 60 and over automatically qualify for membership in the program and receive a Golden Buckeye card in the mail. Adults age 18 to 59 years old with disabilities as defined by Social Security also qualify for the card and can apply for one at most Ohio senior centers and public libraries. This well-known program has been in place since 1976 and entitles cardholders to discounts on purchases at participating Ohio merchants. The current Golden Buckeye card includes the Ohio's Best Rx prescription drug discount program on its back side.

The name of the program comes from the Americans' use of the word "golden" to refer to a person's later life, and "buckeye", the official state tree of Ohio, nickname of the largest state university's athletic team, and general self-referential term for Ohioans.
