= Wilbur M. White =

American politician (1890–1973)

Wilbur McKee White
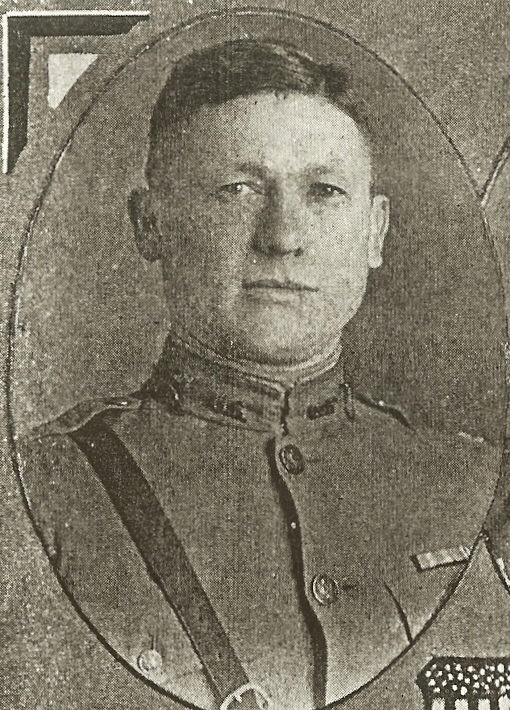

Member of the U.S. House of Representatives from Ohio's 9th district
- In office March 4, 1931 – March 3, 1933
- Preceded by: William W. Chalmers
- Succeeded by: Warren J. Duffey

Personal details
- Born: February 22, 1890 Hillsboro, Ohio, US
- Died: December 31, 1973 (aged 83) Chillicothe, Ohio, US
- Resting place: Hillsboro Cemetery
- Party: Republican
- Education: Marietta College

Military service
- Allegiance: United States
- Branch/service: United States Army
- Rank: Captain
- Unit: 332nd Infantry
- Battles/wars: World War I

Wilbur McKee White (February 22, 1890 – December 31, 1973) was an American politician and World War I veteran who served one term as a U.S. representative from Ohio from 1931 to 1933.

== Biography ==
Born near Hillsboro, Ohio, White was educated in the rural schools and the Hillsboro High School. Marietta College, (Ohio) College, M.A., 1914. He engaged in teaching at Marietta, Ohio, in 1914 and 1915. Correspondent for a Dayton, Ohio, newspaper in 1916. He served in the United States Army on the Mexican border as a private and first sergeant in Company H, Third Ohio Infantry, in 1916. During the First World War served from August 15, 1917, as a first lieutenant and later as a captain in the Three Hundred and Thirty-second Regiment, United States Infantry, in Italy and France. Associated with the Toledo Times in 1919 and served as managing editor 1925-1930 and associate editor in 1930 and 1931.

=== Congress ===
White was elected as a Republican to the Seventy-second Congress (March 4, 1931 – March 3, 1933). He was an unsuccessful candidate for reelection in 1932 and for election in 1940 to the Seventy-seventh Congress.

=== Later career and death ===
He was employed in a glass manufacturing concern in 1933. He served as secretary and as executive director of the Safety Glass Association 1934-1958. He engaged in independent highway safety work 1958-1961. He died in Chillicothe, Ohio, December 31, 1973. He was interred in Hillsboro Cemetery, Hillsboro, Ohio.

== Sources ==
- United States Congress. "Wilbur M. White (id: W000397)". Biographical Directory of the United States Congress.

U.S. House of Representatives
Preceded by William W. Chalmers	Member of the U.S. House of Representatives from Ohio's 9th congressional district March 4, 1931–March 3, 1933	Succeeded by Warren J. Duffey
