= Thomas L. Ashley =

American businessman and politician (1923–2010)

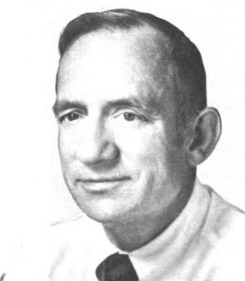
- Official portrait, 1977

Member of the U.S. House of Representatives from Ohio's 9th district
- In office January 3, 1955 – January 3, 1981
- Preceded by: Frazier Reams
- Succeeded by: Ed Weber

Personal details
- Born: Thomas William Ludlow Ashley; January 11, 1923 Toledo, Ohio, U.S.
- Died: June 15, 2010 (aged 87) Leland, Michigan, U.S.
- Resting place: Woodlawn Cemetery
- Party: Democratic
- Spouse: Kathleen Lucey (m. 1967; died 1997)
- Children: 3
- Education: Yale University (BA); Ohio State University (JD)

Military service
- Allegiance: United States
- Branch/service: United States Army
- Battles/wars: World War II

Thomas William Ludlow "Lud" Ashley (January 11, 1923 – June 15, 2010) was an American businessman, lawyer, and politician of the Democratic Party. He served as a U.S. representative from Ohio from 1955 to 1981.

== Early life and education ==
Ashley was born on January 11, 1923, in Toledo, Ohio, and raised in the Old West End. He was the son of Mary Alida Gouverneur (née Ludlow) Ashley and William Meredith Ashley, who owned a small steel manufacturing firm. His older brother William was killed in May 1944, at age 22, when his Army bomber exploded during a training mission over Massachusetts.

Ashley attended Maumee Valley Country Day School and graduated from the Kent School in Connecticut in 1942. During World War II, he served in the United States Army as a corporal in the Pacific Theater of Operations. After the war, Ashley attended Yale University, where he graduated in 1948. At Yale, he was a member of the secret society Skull and Bones along with future U.S. President George H. W. Bush.

After graduating from Yale, Ashley worked with the Toledo Publicity and Efficiency Commission. Encouraged by Michael DiSalle, then mayor of Toledo and later governor of Ohio, he began studying law through night classes at the University of Toledo College of Law. He graduated from Ohio State University College of Law in 1951. He was admitted to the bar that year and began practicing law.

== Career ==
Ashley joined the staff of Radio Free Europe (RFE) in 1952. He served in Europe for RFE as the co-director of the press section and later the assistant director of special projects. He resigned from RFE on March 1, 1954, to run for Congress.

=== U.S. Congress ===
Ashley was elected to Congress in 1954, beating the incumbent Frazier Reams, an independent, by 4,000 votes in a three-way race. He served 13 terms in Congress and was chairman of the Select Committee on Energy (Ad Hoc) from 1977 to 1979 and of the United States House Committee on Merchant Marine and Fisheries from 1979 to 1981.

In 1961, Ashley was one of six congressmen who voted to withdraw funding for the House Un-American Activities Committee. He helped pass the 1964 Civil Rights Act and was a proponent of anti-poverty and housing legislation.

In 1980, Ashley lost in an upset to Republican challenger Ed Weber.

=== Later career ===
Ashley was a member of the George H. W. Bush Presidential Library and Museum board and served on many corporate boards, including Fannie Mae and Freddie Mac, the country's two largest mortgage lenders.

== Personal life ==
Ashley was twice married. He married Margaret Mary Sherman in 1956 and had a daughter, Lise Ashley Murphy, but they separated and divorced quickly thereafter. He married Kathleen Lucey in 1967 at the Cathedral of St. Mary of the Assumption in Trenton, New Jersey. Kathleen, the daughter of Charley Lucey (editor of The Times Newspapers in Trenton), was a graduate of Trinity College and Georgetown Law School and the Washington editor for the United States Savings and Loan League. They had two children:

- William Meredith Ashley, who married Monica Ann Manginello in 2008.
- Mark Michael Ashley

== Death and legacy ==
Kathleen Ashley died of heart failure at George Washington University Hospital in 1997. Lud Ashley lived in Leland, Michigan, until his death from melanoma at his home on June 15, 2010. After his death, George H. W. Bush said in a statement that he and Barbara Bush "mourn the loss of a very close friend" and said Ashley "might well have been my very best friend in life."

Ashley was the great-great-grandson of James Mitchell Ashley, who was a U.S. Representative from Ohio from 1859 to 1869, and was one of the main architects of the Thirteenth Amendment.

== Electoral history ==
Year	Democratic	Republican	Other
1954	✓ Thomas L. Ashley: 48,471	Irving C. Reynolds: 39,933	Frazier Reams (Independent, Incumbent): 44,656
1956	✓ Thomas L. Ashley (Incumbent):	Harvey G. Straub: 81,562	(none)
1958	✓ Thomas L. Ashley (Incumbent): 102,115	William K. Gernheuser: 63,660	(none)
1960	✓ Thomas L. Ashley (Incumbent): 108,688	Howard C. Cook: 82,433	(none)
1962	✓ Thomas L. Ashley (Incumbent): 86,443	Martin A. Janis: 64,279	(none)
1964	✓ Thomas L. Ashley (Incumbent): 109,167	John O. Celusta: 64,401	(none)
1966	✓ Thomas L. Ashley (Incumbent): 83,261	Jane M. Kuebbeler: 53,777	(none)
1968	✓ Thomas L. Ashley (Incumbent): 85,280	Ben Marsh: 63,290	(none)
1970	✓ Thomas L. Ashley (Incumbent): 82,777	Allen H. Shapiro: 33,947	(none)
1972	✓ Thomas L. Ashley (Incumbent): 110,450	Joseph C. Richards: 49,388	(none)
1974	✓ Thomas L. Ashley (Incumbent): 64,831	Carty Finkbeiner: 57,892	(none)
1976	✓ Thomas L. Ashley (Incumbent): 91,040	Carty Finkbeiner: 73,919	Edward S. Emery: 1,533; Lynn Galonsky: 1,477
1978	✓ Thomas L. Ashley (Incumbent): 71,709	John C. Hoyt: 34,326	Edward S. Emery: 2,563; Michael James Lewinski: 4,530

U.S. House of Representatives
Preceded by Frazier Reams	Member of the U.S. House of Representatives from Ohio's 9th congressional district 1955–1981	Succeeded by Ed Weber
Political offices
Preceded by John M. Murphy; New York	Chairman of House Merchant Marine and Fisheries Committee; 1980–1981	Succeeded by Walter B. Jones Sr. North Carolina
