= Timeline of Toledo, Ohio =

The following is a timeline of the history of the city of Toledo, Ohio, USA.

== Prior to 20th century ==
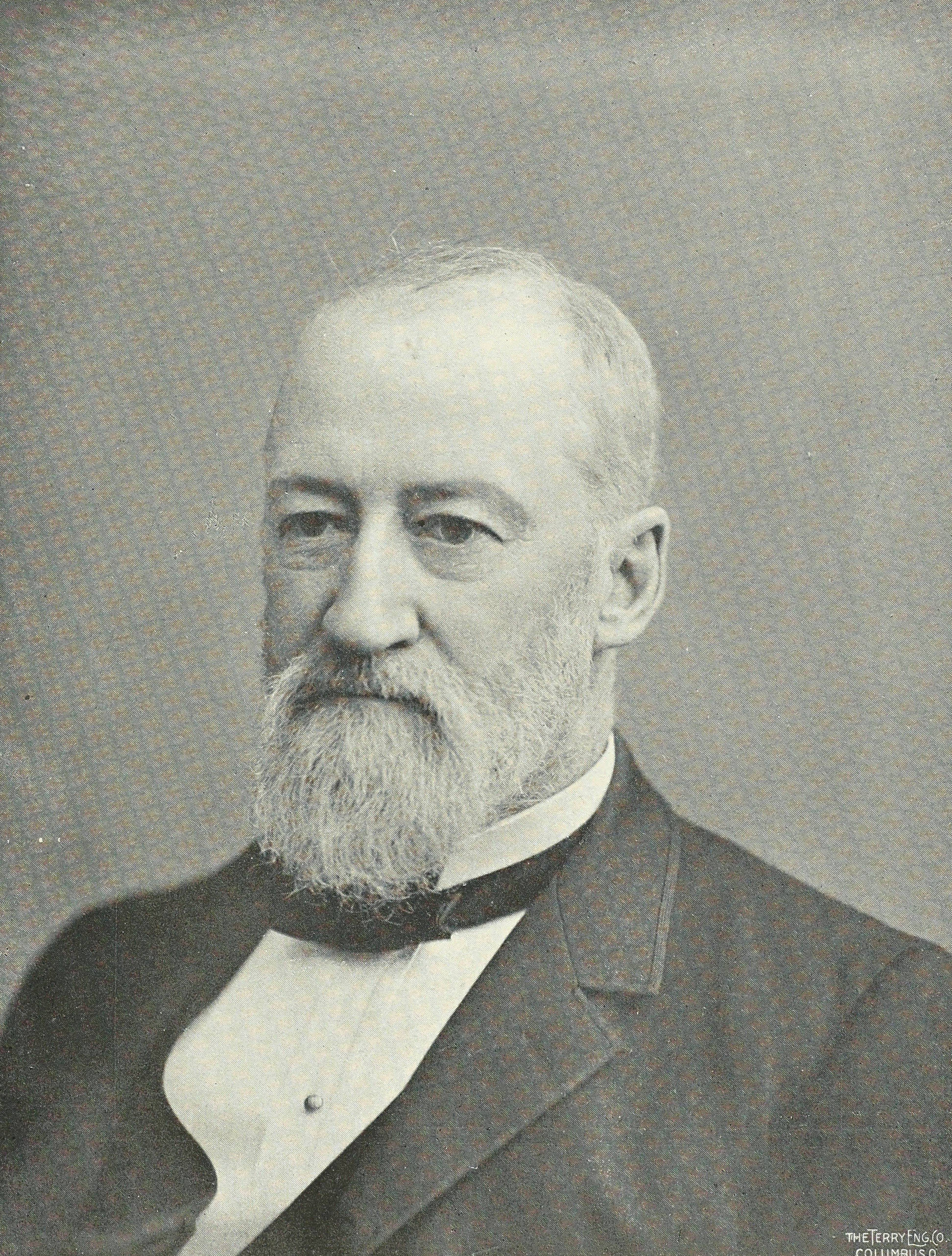
John Berdan

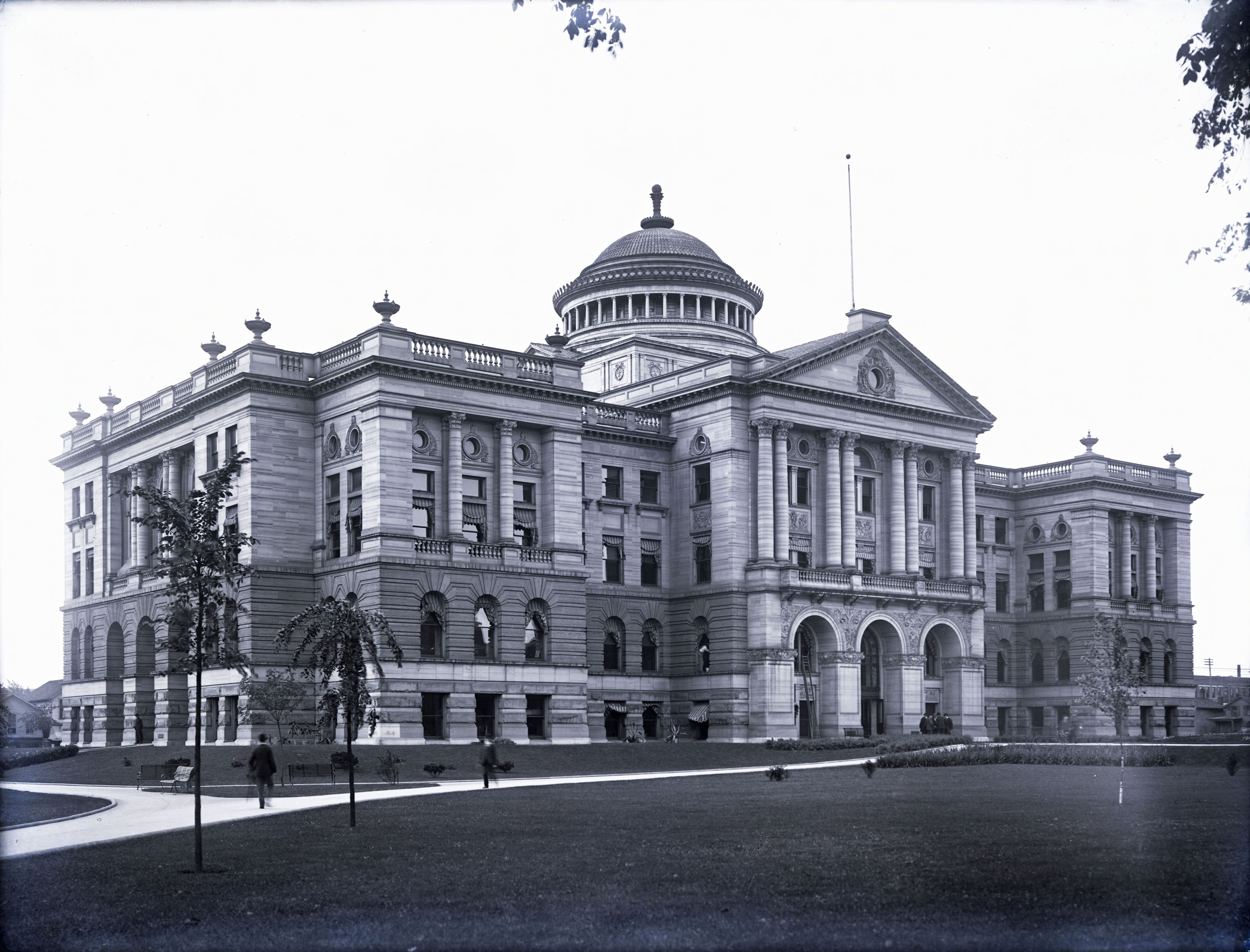
Lucas County Courthouse

- 1835
  - Toledo Blade newspaper begins publication.
  - Lucas County, Ohio established.
- 1836 - Erie and Kalamazoo Railroad begins operating.
- 1837
  - Toledo incorporated.
  - John Berdan becomes mayor.
  - Fire Department established.
- 1845 - Miami and Erie Canal opens.
- 1850 - Population: 3,829.
- 1851 - Toledo Medical Association founded.
- 1862 - Cherry Street bridge built.
- 1864 - Toledo Library Association formed.
- 1869 - Wheeling and Lake Erie Railway in operation.
- 1870
  - Toledo Society of Natural Sciences established.
  - Population: 31,584.
- 1872 - Toledo University of Arts and Trades established.
- 1873
  - St. Ursula Academy founded.
  - Toledo Public Library opens.
- 1875 - Milburn Wagon Company in business.
- 1877 - Railroad strike.
- 1880 - Population: 50,137.
- 1888 - Libbey Glass Company in business.
- 1894 - Tiedtke's grocery in business.
- 1896 - Lucas County Court House built.
- 1898 - First Church of Christ, Scientist built.
- 1900
  - Toledo Zoological Gardens established.
  - Population: 131,822.

== 20th century ==
- 1901
  - Toledo Museum of Art founded.
  - Toledo Scale Company in business.
- 1902 - Toledo Automobile Club established.
- 1907 - Isaac R. Sherwood becomes U.S. representative for Ohio's 9th congressional district.
- 1910
  - Willys-Overland automobile plant built.
  - Roman Catholic Diocese of Toledo established.
- 1918 - Municipal Hospital opens.
- 1920 - Population: 243,164.
- 1929 - Hillcrest Hotel built.
- 1930 - Indiana Avenue YMCA and Toledo Hospital building on North Cove Boulevard open.
- 1931
  - High Level Bridge built.
  - Sister city relationship established with Toledo, Spain.
- 1932 - National City Bank Building constructed.
- 1934 - April 12: Auto-Lite strike begins.
- 1936 - Brand Whitlock Homes built.
- 1937 - Point Place becomes part of city.
- 1938 - Owens Corning Corporation headquartered in city.
- 1950 - Population: 303,616.
- 1953 - WGTE-TV begins broadcasting.
- 1954
  - Islamic Center of Greater Toledo built in Perrysburg.
  - Miracle Mile Drive-In cinema opens.
- 1955 - Toledo-Lucas County Port Authority and Downtown Toledo Associates established.
- 1959 - Toledo Opera founded.
- 1964 - Toledo Botanical Garden established.
- 1966 - Reynolds Corners becomes part of city.
- 1968 - Toledo Metropolitan Area Council of Governments established.
- 1969
  - July 4: Ohio Fireworks Derecho.
  - Masonic Auditorium and Fiberglas Tower built.
- 1970 - Toledo-Lucas County Public Library established.
- 1971 - Franklin Park Mall in business.
- 1978 - Western Lake Erie Historical Society founded.
- 1982 - One SeaGate hi-rise and DiSalle Government Center built.
- 1983 - Marcy Kaptur becomes U.S. representative for Ohio's 9th congressional district.
- 1984 - Toledo Northwestern Ohio Food Bank established.
- 1985 - Franklin Park Mall cinema in business.
- 1987 - SeaGate Convention Centre opens.
- 1990 - Population: 332,943.
- 1992 - Toledo Natural Food Cooperative opens.
- 1994 - Carty Finkbeiner becomes mayor.
- 1997 - Toledo's Attic (city history website) launched.
- 1998 - City website online (approximate date).

== 21st century ==
- 2002
  - Fifth Third Field (stadium) opens.
  - Jack Ford becomes mayor.
- 2005 - October 15: 2005 Toledo riot.
- 2006 - Carty Finkbeiner becomes mayor again.
- 2009 - Huntington Center (arena) opens.
- 2010
  - Michael Bell becomes mayor.
  - Population: 287,208.
- 2014 - D. Michael Collins becomes mayor.
- 2015 - February: Mayor Collins dies; Paula Hicks-Hudson becomes acting mayor.
- 2018 - Wade Kapszukiewicz becomes mayor.

== See also ==
- Toledo history
- List of mayors of Toledo, Ohio
- National Register of Historic Places listings in Lucas County, Ohio

Other cities in Ohio

- Timeline of Cincinnati
- Timeline of Cleveland
- Timeline of Columbus, Ohio

== Bibliography ==
- Toledo City Directory. R.L. Polk & Company. 1883. hdl:2027/mdp.39015035098469.
- Federal Writers' Project (1940), "Toledo", Ohio Guide, American Guide Series, New York: Oxford University Press, p. 324+ – via Open Library. + Chronology
- "Timeline". Wholly Toledo: The Business and Industry that Shaped the City. University of Toledo, Libraries. 2010. Archived from the original on September 28, 2015.
