= 2009 Toledo, Ohio mayoral election =

- November 3, 2009
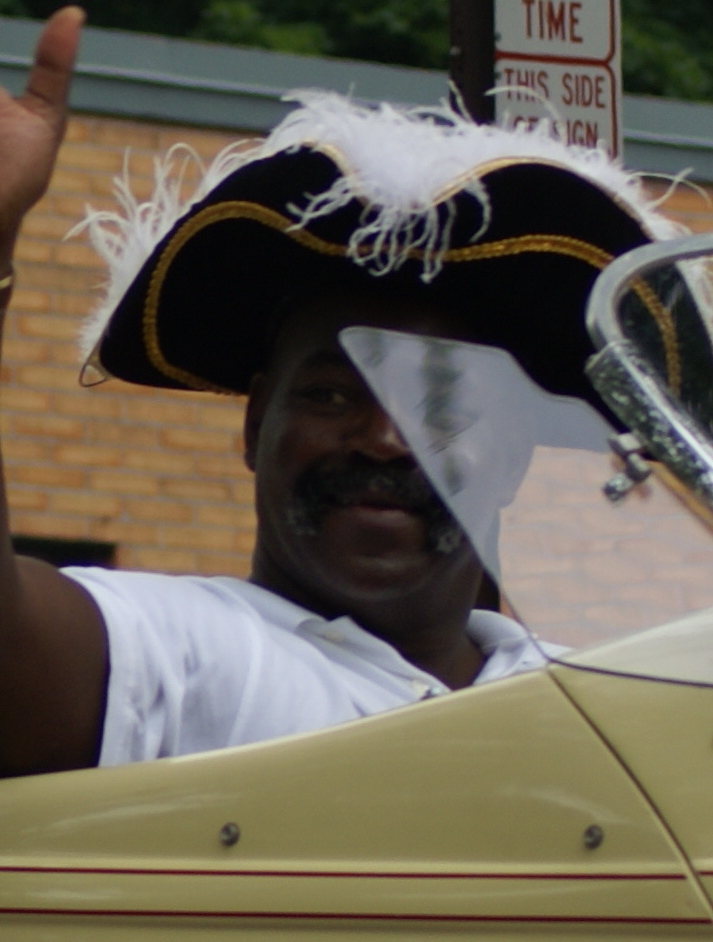

Candidate	Mike Bell	Keith Wilkowski
Party	Nonpartisan	Nonpartisan
Popular vote	36,108	32,737
Percentage	52.45%	47.55%
Mayor before election
Carty Finkbeiner
Nonpartisan
Elected mayor
Mike Bell
Nonpartisan

The 2009 Toledo, Ohio mayoral election took place on November 3, 2009, to elect the mayor of Toledo, Ohio. Incumbent Mayor Carty Finkbeiner declined to run for re-election to a second consecutive term and fourth term overall. A crowded field emerged to succeed him, including former city fire chief Mike Bell, City Councilman D. Michael Collins, County commissioners Ben Konop, former County Commissioner and 2005 mayoral candidate Keith Wilkowski, and businessman James Moody.

In the primary election, Wilkowski narrowly defeated Bell for first place, winning 31 percent of the vote to Bell's 29 percent. Bell ultimately defeated Wilkowski by a narrow margin, receiving 52 percent of the vote to Wilkowski's 48 percent.

== Primary election ==
=== Candidates ===
- Keith Wilkowski, former County Commissioner, 2005 candidate for Mayor (Democratic)
- Mike Bell, former Chief of the Toledo Fire & Rescue Department, former Ohio Fire Marshal (independent)
- James Moody, businessman (Republican)
- D. Michael Collins, City Councilman (independent)
- Ben Konop, County Commissioner (Democratic)
- Opal Covey, perennial candidate (independent)

=== Results ===
Primary election results
Party	Candidate	Votes	%
Nonpartisan	Keith Wilkowski	11,392	30.78%
Nonpartisan	Mike Bell	10,779	29.13%
Nonpartisan	James Moody	5,682	15.35%
Nonpartisan	D. Michael Collins	5,399	14.59%
Nonpartisan	Ben Konop	3,503	9.47%
Nonpartisan	Opal Covey	254	0.69%
Total votes		37,009	100.00%

== General election ==
=== Results ===
2009 Toledo mayoral election results
Party	Candidate	Votes	%
Nonpartisan	Mike Bell	36,108	52.45%
Nonpartisan	Keith Wilkowski	32,737	47.55%
Total votes		68,845	100.00%
