= 2013 Toledo, Ohio mayoral election =

2013 Toledo Mayor elections

- November 5, 2013

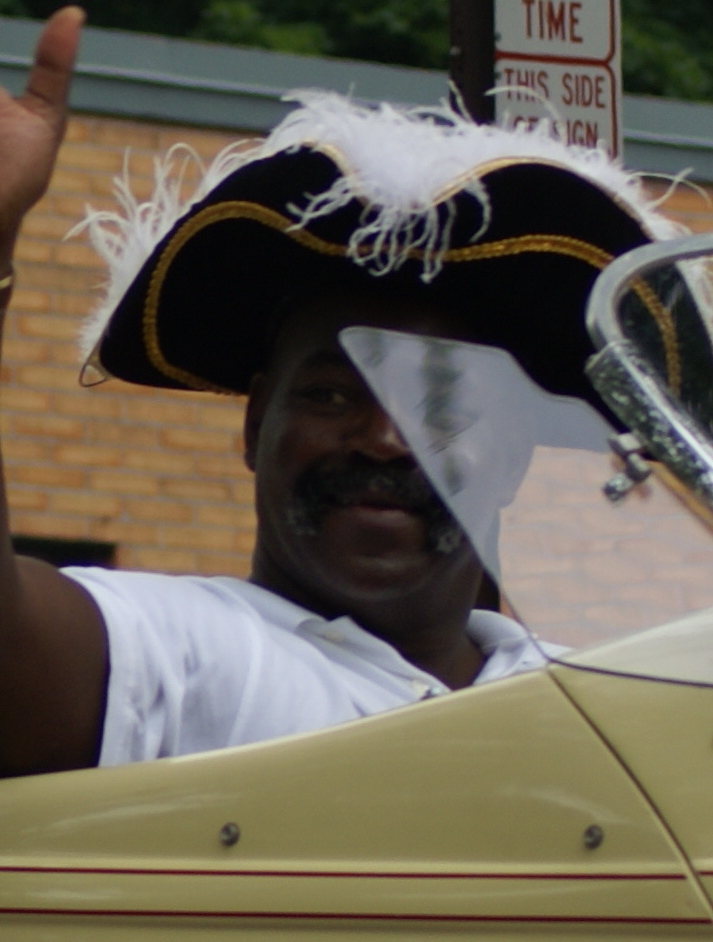
Candidate	D. Michael Collins	Michael Bell
Party	Independent	Independent
Popular vote	28,159	21,721
Percentage	56.45%	43.55%
Mayor before election
Michael Bell
Independent
Elected mayor
D. Michael Collins
Independent

Toledo, Ohio, held an election for mayor on November 5, 2013. The election was officially nonpartisan, with the top two candidates from the September 10 primary election advancing to the general election, regardless of party. Incumbent independent mayor Michael Bell lost reelection to independent city councilor D. Michael Collins.

== Primary election ==
=== Candidates ===
==== Declared ====
- Michael Bell, incumbent mayor of Toledo
- D. Michael Collins, city councilor
- Opal Covey, perennial candidate
- Alan Cox, president of AFSCME Local 2058
- Donald Gozdowski
- Michael Konwinski, former city employee
- Anita Lopez, Lucas County Auditor
- Joe McNamara, city councilor and former president of Toledo City Council

==== Declined ====
- Michael Ashford, state representative (ran for reelection)
- Carty Finkbeiner, former mayor of Toledo
- Wade Kapszukiewicz, Lucas County Treasurer (ran for reelection)

=== Results ===
Primary election results
Party	Candidate	Votes	%
Independent	Michael Bell (incumbent)	6,382	26.64
Independent	D. Michael Collins	5,841	24.38
Democratic	Anita Lopez	5,533	23.10
Democratic	Joe McNamara	5,365	22.39
Independent	Alan Cox	382	1.59
Libertarian	Michael Konwinski	284	1.19
Republican	Opal Covey	142	0.59
Write-in	Donald Gozdowski	3	0.01
Total votes		23,957	100

== General election ==
=== Candidates ===
- Michael Bell, incumbent mayor of Toledo
- D. Michael Collins, city councilor

=== Endorsements ===
Michael Bell

Notable individuals

- Adam Martinez, city councilor (Democrat)

Organizations

- Lucas County Republican Party
- Toledo Board of Realtors
D. Michael Collins

Notable individuals

- Pete Gerken, Lucas County Commissioner
- Chris Redfern, state representative and chair of the Ohio Democratic Party

Labor unions

- AFL–CIO
- IAFF - International Association of Fire Fighters Local 92
- Northwest Ohio Building and Construction Trades Council
- TPPA - Toledo Police Patrolman's Association
- UAW – United Auto Workers

Organizations

- Ohio Democratic Party

=== Results ===
2013 Toledo mayoral election
Party	Candidate	Votes	%
Independent	D. Michael Collins	28,159	56.45
Independent	Michael Bell (incumbent)	21,721	43.55
Total votes		49,880	100
