= 2015 United States elections =

- ← 2013 2014 2015 2016 2017 → Off-year elections
- Election day: November 3

Congressional special elections
- Seats contested: 3 House mid-term vacancies
- Net seat change: 0
- Map of the 2015 House special elections Republican hold (3)

Gubernatorial elections
- Seats contested: 3
- Net seat change: 0
- Map of the 2015 gubernatorial races Republican hold (1); Republican gain (1) Democratic gain (1)

Elections were held in the United States on (for the most part) November 3, 2015. The off-year election included a special election for Speaker of the House. There were also gubernatorial and state legislative elections in a few states; as well as numerous citizen initiatives, mayoral races, and a variety of other local offices on the ballot.

None of the three congressional seats that were up for special elections changed party hands. The Democrats picked up the governorship in Louisiana, while the Republicans picked up the one in Kentucky and held onto the governorship in Mississippi. The Republicans also picked up other various statewide offices. This led NPR to call the 2015 elections "a stinging rebuke to President Obama ... cap[ping] off yet another disappointing election cycle for Democrats", who have performed poorly against the Republicans in midterm and off-year elections during Obama's tenure. According to The Washington Post, the election results were characterized by deepening political polarization, as the Democrats held their own or even gained ground in Democratic-leaning cities and states, while Republican gains were concentrated in Republican-leaning states.

== Federal elections ==
The following special elections were held to replace Senators or House Representatives who either died or resigned while in office:

- Illinois's 18th congressional district: Representative Aaron Schock announced his resignation on March 17, 2015. The election was held on September 10, 2015, and won by Republican Darin LaHood, who was sworn in on September 17, 2015.
- Mississippi's 1st congressional district: Representative Alan Nunnelee died on February 6, 2015. The election was won by Republican Trent Kelly, who was sworn into office on June 2, 2015.
- New York's 11th congressional district: Representative Michael Grimm resigned from Congress on January 5, 2015, after pleading guilty to tax evasion. The election was won by Republican Daniel M. Donovan, Jr., who was sworn into office on May 12, 2015.

=== Congressional leadership election ===
After John Boehner of Ohio's 8th congressional district announced his resignation from the position of Speaker of the House on September 25, a special election to replace him was initially scheduled for October 8. However, after initial frontrunner Kevin McCarthy, the current House Majority leader of California's 23rd congressional district, suddenly withdrew from the race the day of the nomination vote, Republican leadership decided to move the election further back, to an unknown date later in October, if not beyond that. Both the second Republican frontrunner, Jason Chaffetz of Utah's 3rd congressional district, and Chairman of the Government Oversight and Reform Committee, and Bill Flores of Texas's 17th congressional district, withdrew on October 20 and 22, respectively, to express their support for Paul Ryan, the vice presidential candidate in 2012, Chairman of the Ways and Means Committee, and representative of Wisconsin's 1st congressional district, who entered the race on October 22 after long being considered a potential frontrunner. The only other Republican candidate was Daniel Webster of Florida's 10th congressional district, a member of the highly-conservative Freedom Caucus that caused both Boehner to resign and McCarthy to withdraw. The Democratic candidate was current Speaker of the House Nancy Pelosi of California's 12th congressional district. On October 29, Ryan was elected Speaker with 236 of the 432 votes cast. Pelosi received 184, and Webster received 9. Jim Cooper, John Lewis, and Colin Powell all received 1 each.

== State elections ==
=== Gubernatorial ===
Three states held gubernatorial elections in 2015.

- Kentucky: Democrat Steve Beshear is term-limited and could not run for re-election to a third term in office. Republican Matt Bevin won the election.
- Louisiana: Republican Bobby Jindal is term-limited and could not run for re-election to a third term in office. Democrat John Bel Edwards won the election.
- Mississippi: Republican Phil Bryant ran for re-election to a second term in office. Bryant was re-elected.

=== Statewide executive offices ===
Three states held elections for statewide executive offices in 2015:

- Kentucky: Elections were held for the offices of Attorney General, Secretary of State, State Auditor, State Treasurer and Agriculture Commissioner.
- Louisiana: Elections were held for the offices of Lieutenant Governor, Attorney General, Secretary of State, State Treasurer, Commissioner of Agriculture and Forestry and Commissioner of Insurance.
- Mississippi: Elections were held for the offices of Lieutenant Governor, Attorney General, Secretary of State, State Treasurer, State Auditor, Commissioner of Agriculture and Commerce, Commissioner of Insurance and the Mississippi Public Service Commission.

=== State legislatures ===
Seven legislative elections were held for four states in 2015: Louisiana, Mississippi, New Jersey, and Virginia. In New Jersey, only the lower house of the legislature held elections. Republicans maintained control of both chambers of the Louisiana, Mississippi, and Virginia legislatures, while Democrats maintained control of the New Jersey General Assembly.

=== Judicial ===
- Pennsylvania: Democrats won all three open seats, thereby flipping the court from a 4-3 Republican majority to a 5-2 Democratic majority.
- Wisconsin: Liberal justice Ann Walsh Bradley was re-elected for another 10-year term.

=== Ballot Measures ===
Many states had voters reject or approve ballot measures.

== Local elections ==
Various elections were held for officeholders in numerous cities, counties, school boards, special districts and others around the country.

=== Mayoral elections ===
Some of the large cities holding mayoral elections include:

- Anchorage, AK: Republican Dan Sullivan is term-limited and cannot run for re-election to a third term in office. Democrat Ethan Berkowitz was elected to replace Sullivan.
- Arlington, TX: Republican Robert Cluck was defeated for a seventh term as mayor by Jeff Williams.
- Boise, ID: Democrat David H. Bieter won re-election to a fourth term in office.
- Cary, NC: Democrat Harold Weinbrecht won re-election to a third term in office.
- Charlotte, NC: Democrat Dan Clodfelter was defeated in the Democratic primary. Jennifer Roberts won the Democratic primary and election.
- Chicago, IL: Democrat Rahm Emanuel won re-election to a second term in office.
- Colorado Springs, CO: Republican Steve Bach is retiring rather than running for re-election to a second term. Republican John Suthers was elected to replace Bach.
- Columbus, OH: Democrat Michael B. Coleman is retiring rather than running for re-election to a fifth term in office. Democrat Andrew Ginther was elected to replace Coleman.
- Dallas, TX: Democrat Mike Rawlings won re-election to a second term in office.
- Denver, CO: Democrat Michael Hancock won re-election to a second full term in office.
- Duluth, MN: Democrat Don Ness is retiring rather than running for re-election to a third term in office.
- Fort Wayne, IN: Democrat Tom Henry is running for re-election to a third term.
- Fort Worth, TX: Republican Betsy Price won re-election to a third term in office.
- Greensboro, NC: Democrat Nancy Vaughan is running for re-election to a second term.
- Hartford, CT: Incumbent Pedro Segarra was defeated in the Democratic primary election by Luke Bronin. Bronin then defeated independent Joel Cruz, Jr. in the general election.
- Houston, TX: Democrat Annise Parker is term-limited and could not run for re-election to a fourth term in office. A run off was held on December 12, 2015. Democrat Sylvester Turner won the election.
- Indianapolis, IN: Republican Greg Ballard is retiring rather than running for re-election to a third term in office. Democrat Joe Hogsett was elected to replace Ballard.
- Jacksonville, FL: Democrat Alvin Brown was defeated for a second term in office by Republican Lenny Curry.
- Kansas City, MO: Incumbent Sly James won re-election to a second term in office.
- Knoxville, TN: Democrat Madeline Rogero is running for re-election to a second term.
- Las Vegas, NV: Incumbent Democrat Carolyn Goodman won re-election to a second term in office.
- Lincoln, NE: Democrat Chris Beutler won re-election to an unprecedented third term in office.
- Madison, WI: Democrat Paul Soglin won re-election to an eighth term in office.
- Memphis, TN: Democrat A C Wharton lost re-election to a fifth full term in office. Mayor-elect Jim Strickland won the election, with 41.5% of the votes cast, compared to Wharton's 22%.
- Montgomery, AL: Republican Todd Strange won re-election to a third term in office.
- Nashville, TN: Democrat Karl Dean is term-limited and could not run for re-election to a third term in office. Democrat Megan Barry was elected to replace Dean.
- Orlando, FL: Incumbent Democrat Buddy Dyer won re-election for a fourth term.
- Philadelphia, PA: Democrat Michael Nutter is term-limited and could not run for re-election to a third term in office. Democrat James F. Kenney was elected to replace Nutter.
- Phoenix, AZ: Democrat Greg Stanton won re-election to a second term in office.
- Portland, ME: Incumbent Democrat Michael Brennan was defeated for reelection by fellow Democrat Ethan Strimling.
- Raleigh, NC: Incumbent Nancy McFarlane won re-election to a second term in office.
- Salt Lake City, UT: Democrat Jackie Biskupski defeated Incumbent Democrat Ralph Becker.
- San Antonio, TX: Democrat Ivy Taylor won election to a first full term in office.
- San Francisco, CA: Democrat Ed Lee won re-election to a second term in office.
- South Bend, IN: Democrat Peter Buttigieg won re-election to a second term in office.
- Springfield, MO: Libertarian Robert Stephens won re-election.
- Tampa, FL: Democrat Bob Buckhorn was re-elected to a second term in office.
- Toledo, OH: Democrat Paula Hicks-Hudson (acting mayor) is running in a special election to fill the remainder of the term of late Mayor D. Michael Collins.
- Tucson, AZ: Democrat Jonathan Rothschild is running for re-election to a second term.
- West Palm Beach, FL: Democrat Jeri Muoio won re-election to a second term in office.
- Wichita, KS: Democrat Carl Brewer is term-limited and could not run for re-election to a third term in office. Republican Jeff Longwell was elected to replace Brewer.

=== Other local elections ===
Other city offices

- Chicago Alderman

Local propositions

- Houston, Texas Proposition 1: A referendum on an anti-discrimination ordinance known as the Houston Equal Rights Ordinance. Houston voters rejected this measure.

== Tables of partisan control results ==
These tables show the partisan results of the Congressional special elections and gubernatorial races in 2015. Bold indicates a change in control.

House Congressional seats
	Before 2015 elections		After 2015 elections	
District	Incumbent	State delegation	Winner	State delegation
Illinois 18th	Rep	Dem 10–8	Rep	Dem 10–8
Mississippi 1st	Rep	Rep 3–1	Rep	Rep 3–1
New York 11th	Dem	Dem 18–9	Dem	Dem 18–9
United States	Rep 247–188		Rep 247–188	

Governorships
State	Incumbent	Winner
Kentucky	Dem	**Rep**
Louisiana	Rep	**Dem**
Mississippi	Rep	Rep
United States	Rep 31–18–1	Rep 31–18–1
