= 2015 Toledo, Ohio mayoral special election =

2015 Toledo mayoral special election
- November 3, 2015
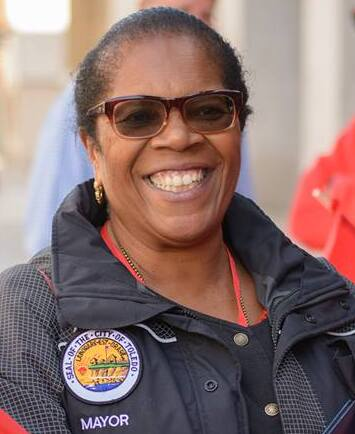

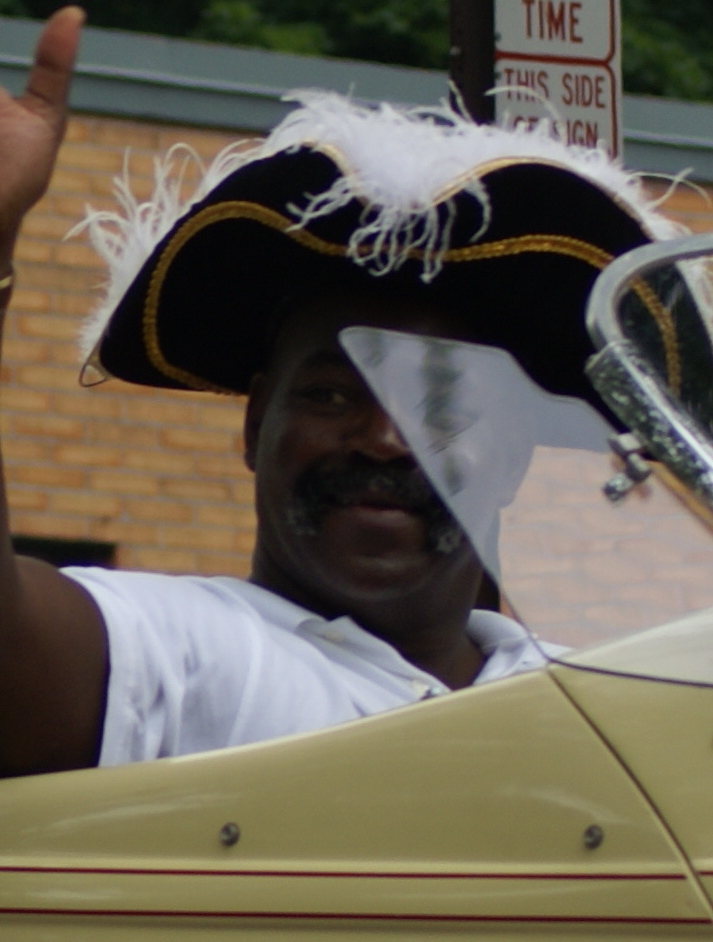

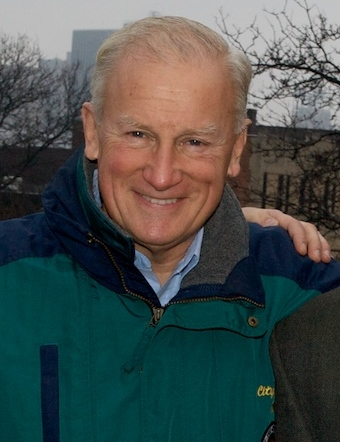
Nominee	Paula Hicks-Hudson	Michael Bell	Carty Finkbeiner
Party	Democratic	Independent	Democratic
Popular vote	23,087	11,228	10,276
Percentage	35.63%	17.33%	15.86%
Nominee	Sandy Drabik Collins	Sandy Spang	Mike Ferner
Party	Independent	Independent	Independent
Popular vote	9,432	7,028	3,208
Percentage	14.55%	10.85%	4.95%
Mayor before election
Paula Hicks-Hudson (Acting)
Democratic
Elected mayor
Paula Hicks-Hudson
Democratic

The 2015 Toledo mayoral special election was held on November 3, 2015, to determine the mayor of Toledo, Ohio and to finish the term of former mayor D. Michael Collins who died in office.

Incumbent acting mayor Paula Hicks-Hudson was elected mayor with 35.63% of the vote.

== Candidates ==
- Michael Bell, former mayor of Toledo
- Sandy Drabik Collins, former director of Ohio Department of Administrative Services and widow of former mayor D. Michael Collins
- Opal Covey, perennial candidate
- Mike Ferner, former city councilor
- Carty Finkbeiner, former mayor of Toledo
- Paula Hicks-Hudson, incumbent acting mayor of Toledo and former city council president
- Sandy Spang, city councilor

== Debates ==
2015 Toledo mayoral special election debates
No.	Date	Host(s)	Moderator	Link	Participants						
Key: P Participant A Absent N Non-invitee I Invitee W Withdrawn
Key: P Participant A Absent N Non-invitee I Invitee W Withdrawn					Michael Bell	Sandy Drabik Collins	Opal Covey	Mike Ferner	Carty Finkbeiner	Paula Hicks-Hudson	Sandy Spang
1	Sep. 23, 2015	University of Toledo	Keith Burris	Video	P	P	A	P	P	P	P
2	Oct. 22, 2015	NBC 24 & WSPD	Mark Hyman	Video	P	P	P	P	P	P	P
3	Oct. 28, 2015	WTVG & The Blade		Video	P	P	P	P	P	P	P

== Results ==
2015 Toledo mayoral special election
Party	Candidate	Votes	%
Democratic	Paula Hicks-Hudson (inc.)	23,087	35.63
Independent	Michael Bell	11,228	17.33
Democratic	Carty Finkbeiner	10,276	15.86
Independent	Sandy Drabik Collins	9,432	14.55
Independent	Sandy Spang	7,028	10.85
Independent	Mike Ferner	3,208	4.95
Republican	Opal Covey	544	0.84
Total votes		64,803	100
