= 1993 Toledo, Ohio mayoral election =

- November 2, 1993
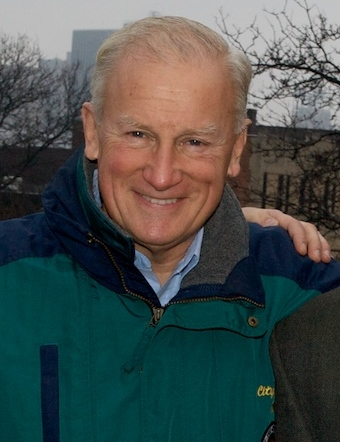

Candidate	Carty Finkbeiner	Mike Ferner
Party	Nonpartisan	Nonpartisan
Popular vote	46,571	45,899
Percentage	50.36%	49.64%
Mayor before election
John McHugh
Nonpartisan
Elected mayor
Carty Finkbeiner
Nonpartisan

The 1993 Toledo, Ohio mayoral election took place on November 2, 1993. Following the adoption of a city charter amendment in 1992, which converted the city to a strong-mayor government, this was the first mayoral election for a four-year term. Incumbent Mayor John McHugh declined to seek re-election, and a crowded race developed to succeed him.

Though the race was formally nonpartisan, City Councilman Peter Silverman won the Democratic Party's endorsement, but City Councilman Carty Finkbeiner and former county party chair Bill Boyle, both Democrats, continued their campaigns without the party endorsement. They were joined by independents Mike Ferner, a City Councilman, and Paula Pennypacker, the 1991, as well as Republican financial consultant Woody Adams and two independent candidates.

In the primary election, Finkbeiner placed first with 27 percent, and Ferner, who won 23 percent, joined him in the general election. Finkbeiner ultimately defeated Ferner by a narrow margin in the general election, winning 50.3 percent of the vote to Ferner's 49.6 percent, a margin of just 672 votes.

== Primary election ==
=== Candidates ===
- Carty Finkbeiner, City Councilman
- Mike Ferner, City Councilman (independent)
- Bill Boyle, businessman, former Chairman of the Lucas County Democratic Party (Democratic)
- Peter Silverman, City Councilman (Democratic)
- Paula Pennypacker, anti-tax activist, 1991 candidate for Mayor (independent)
- Woody Adams, financial consultant (Republican)
- Phil Joelson, attorney (independent)
- Terry Shankland, ice cream shop owner (independent)

=== Results ===
Primary election results
Party	Candidate	Votes	%
Nonpartisan	Carty Finkbeiner	17,862	27.42%
Nonpartisan	Mike Ferner	15,113	23.20%
Nonpartisan	Bill Boyle	12,648	19.42%
Nonpartisan	Peter Silverman	10,468	16.07%
Nonpartisan	Paula Pennypacker	6,322	9.71%
Nonpartisan	Woody Adams	1,909	2.93%
Nonpartisan	Phil Joelson	481	0.74%
Nonpartisan	Terry Shankland	334	0.51%
Total votes		65,137	100.00%

== General election ==
=== Results ===
1993 Toledo mayoral election results
Party	Candidate	Votes	%
Nonpartisan	Carty Finkbeiner	46,571	50.36%
Nonpartisan	Mike Ferner	45,899	49.64%
Total votes		92,470	100.00%
