= Edna Brown =

American politician (1940–2022)

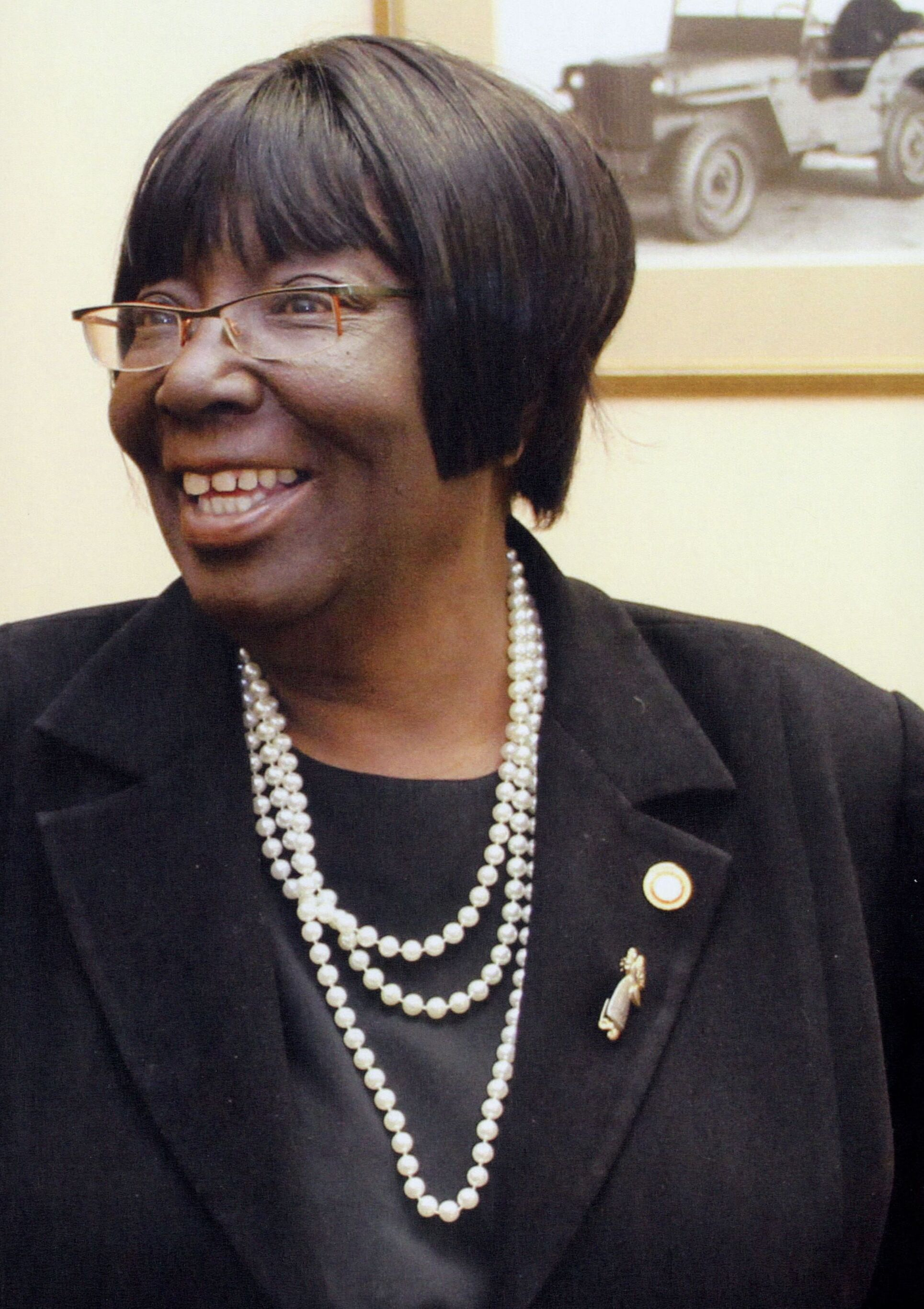

Member of the Ohio Senate from the 11th district
- In office January 3, 2011 – December 31, 2018
- Preceded by: Teresa Fedor
- Succeeded by: Teresa Fedor

Member of the Ohio House of Representatives from the 48th district
- In office January 8, 2002 – December 31, 2010
- Preceded by: Jack Ford
- Succeeded by: Michael Ashford

Personal details
- Born: April 7, 1940 Toledo, Ohio, U.S.
- Died: January 1, 2022 (aged 81) Ohio, U.S.
- Party: Democratic
- Education: Mary Manse College

Edna Brown (April 7, 1940 – January 1, 2022) was an American politician, member of the Democratic Party and Minority Whip of the Ohio Senate, serving the 11th District from 2011 to 2018. She also served in the Ohio House of Representatives from 2001 to 2010.

== Career ==
Edna R. Brown had a 32-year career as an employee with the city of Toledo, followed by a six-year tenure on Toledo City Council.

When incumbent Jack Ford resigned from the House to become Mayor of Toledo, Ohio, Brown was appointed to serve the remainder of his term. She was elected to a full term in 2002, defeating Republican Cathleen Voyles-Baden by 13,000 votes. Brown went on to win reelection in 2004, 2006, and 2008.

In 2004, Brown, C.J. Prentiss and Shirley Smith were chosen to serve on the executive committee of the National Black Caucus of State Legislators during the organization's conference in Philadelphia. For the 127th General Assembly Brown served as second vice president of the Ohio Legislative Black Caucus, and first vice president for the 128th General Assembly.

In 2009, Speaker of the House Armond Budish named Brown as Chairman of the Human Services Subcommittee of the House Finance Committee.

== Ohio Senate ==
In 2009, Brown stated that she would be a candidate for the Ohio Senate in 2010, to replace the term limited Teresa Fedor. She was expected to face Peter Ujvagi in the primary election, but he was hired as Lucas County Administrator.

The appointment of Ujvagi set up what many thought was going to be a legislative shuffle, where Fedor was appointed to Ujvagi's seat, and Brown then appointed to Fedor's seat. However, Toledo City Councilman Joe McNamara also sought the appointment to the Senate. As a result, Fedor kept her seat, Brown hers, and Joe Walter was appointed to a nine-month term in Ujvagi's seat.

McNamara's entrance into the campaign reinvigorated a primary battle. Brown defeated McNamara by about 2,300 votes. She defeated Republican Tom Waniewski by 18,000 votes in the general election.

Brown was sworn into office on January 3, 2011, and was the first African-American to represent the city of Toledo in the state Senate. For the 129th General Assembly, Senate colleagues elected Brown as Senate minority whip. She was a member of the Senate Rules Committee; Agriculture, Environment and Natural Resources Committee; Financial Institutions Committee; Health, Human Services and Aging Committee (as ranking member); Insurance, Commerce and Labor; and State and Local Government and Veterans Affairs. She also served on the Ohio Children’s Trust Fund Board, the Correctional Institution Inspection Committee and the Ohio Commission on Minority Health.

== Death ==
Brown died in Ohio on January 1, 2022, at the age of 81.
