= 2005 Toledo, Ohio mayoral election =

- November 8, 2005
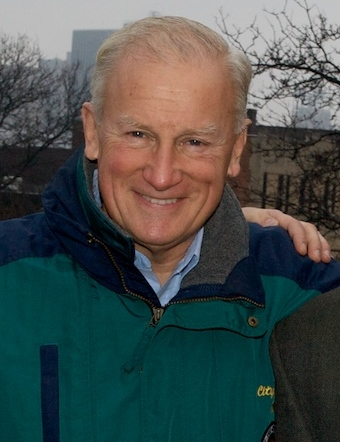

Candidate	Carty Finkbeiner	Jack Ford
Party	Nonpartisan	Nonpartisan
Popular vote	48,899	30,113
Percentage	61.89%	38.11%
Mayor before election
Jack Ford
Nonpartisan
Elected mayor
Carty Finkbeiner
Nonpartisan

The 2005 Toledo, Ohio mayoral election took place on November 8, 2005. Incumbent Mayor Jack Ford ran for re-election to a second term. He was challenged by a crowded field of candidates, with former Mayor Carty Finkbeiner, former County Commissioner Keith Wilkowski, and City Councilman Rob Ludeman. Ford significantly outraised his opponents, but faced a difficult re-election campaign.

In the primary election, Finkbeiner placed first by a wide margin, winning 37 percent of the vote. The race for second place was close between Ford and Wilkowski, but Ford ended up narrowly defeating him, winning 26 percent of the vote to Wilkowski's 23 percent, and advancing to the general election with Finkbeiner. In the general election, Finkbeiner defeated Ford in a landslide, winning 62 percent of the vote.

== Primary election ==
=== Candidates ===
- Carty Finkbeiner, former Mayor (Democratic)
- Jack Ford, incumbent Mayor (Democratic)
- Keith Wilkowski, former County Commissioner (Democratic)
- Rob Ludeman, City Councilman (Republican)
- Opal Covey, minister, 2001 candidate for Mayor (independent)
- Don Gozdowski, contractor (independent)
- Martin Okonski, U.S. Navy veteran (independent)

=== Results ===
Primary election results
Party	Candidate	Votes	%
Nonpartisan	Carty Finkbeiner	15,424	36.73%
Nonpartisan	Jack Ford (inc.)	11,057	26.33%
Nonpartisan	Keith Wilkowski	9,830	23.41%
Nonpartisan	Rob Ludeman	5,419	12.90%
Nonpartisan	Opal Covey	111	0.26%
Nonpartisan	Don Gozdowski	91	0.22%
Nonpartisan	Martin Okonski	64	0.15%
	write-ins	2	0.00%
Total votes		41,998	100.00%

== General election ==
=== Results ===
2005 Toledo mayoral election results
Party	Candidate	Votes	%
Nonpartisan	Carty Finkbeiner	48,899	61.89%
Nonpartisan	Jack Ford (inc.)	30,113	38.11%
Total votes		79,012	100.00%
