= Berdan =

Berdan can refer to:

- John Berdan, first mayor of Toledo, Ohio
- Berdan River, in Turkey
- Hiram Berdan (1824-1893), American marksman, engineer, and military officer
- Berdan's Sharpshooters, the 1st and 2nd United States Volunteer Sharpshooter Regiments raised by Hiram Berdan during the American Civil War and of which he was the commanding colonel of both
- Berdan Sharps rifle, the model of the Sharps military rifle used by Berdan's Sharpshooters
- Berdan rifle, any of several rifles developed by Hiram Berdan after the American Civil War, principally the Berdan II (M1870) rifle of .42 caliber that was the standard rifle of the Russian Army in the late 19th century
- Berdan primer
