= Linda J. Furney =

American politician (born 1947)

Linda Furney
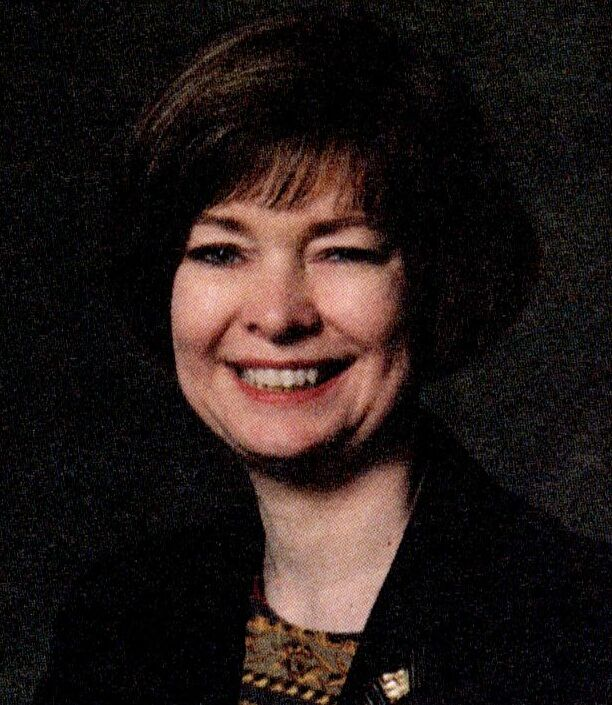

Member of the Ohio Senate from the 11th district
- In office January 2, 1987 – December 31, 2002
- Preceded by: Marigene Valiquette
- Succeeded by: Teresa Fedor

Personal details
- Born: September 11, 1947 (age 78) Toledo, Ohio
- Party: Democratic

Linda Jeanne Furney (born September 11, 1947) was a member of the Ohio Senate from 1987 to 2002. She represented the 11th District, which encompasses all of Toledo, Ohio, and some surrounding communities. Barred by term limits in 2002, she was forced to leave office and was succeeded by Teresa Fedor.

Furney was selected to serve as the Minority Whip in 1994, serving as such in the 121st Ohio General Assembly. In the 122nd Ohio General Assembly, she would be elected to serve as the Assistant Minority Leader. In the 124th general assembly, she was on the Education Committee, Economic Development Committee, Technology and Aerospace Committee, Highways and Transportation Committee, State and Local Government and Veterans Affairs Committee.

== Biography ==
Senator graduated from Sylvania High School in 1965. She graduated from Bowling Green State University in 1969, with a Bachelor of Science degree in Education. She taught English in Washington Local School District, 1969-1972, Home Economics in Springfield Local Schools, 1977-1983, and English at the American School of Rio de Janeiro, 1972-1974. She served as a councilperson on the Toledo City Council from 1983-1986.
