= 1991 Toledo, Ohio mayoral election =

1991 Toledo mayoral election
- November 5, 1991

| Candidate | John McHugh | Paula Pennypacker |
| Party | Nonpartisan | Nonpartisan |
| Popular vote | 53,117 | 36,803 |
| Percentage | 59.07% | 40.93% |
Mayor before election
John McHugh
Nonpartisan
Elected mayor
John McHugh
Nonpartisan

The 1991 Toledo mayoral election took place on November 5, 1991, to elect the mayor of Toledo, Ohio. Incumbent Mayor John McHugh ran for re-election to a second term. He was challenged by anti-tax activist Paula Pennypacker. McHugh campaigned on his Toledo values, noting that he was "practical and down-to-earth" and "a Toledo kind of person," while Pennypacker argued that city government needed "fundamental changes."

In the primary election, Pennypacker only finished 31 votes behind McHugh, but in the general election, McHugh won in a landslide, receiving 59 percent of the vote.

Following the adoption of a charter amendment on November 3, 1992, which converted the city government from a council–manager government to a strong-mayor government and extended mayoral terms to four years, the 1991 election was the last mayoral election for a two-year term.

== Primary election ==
=== Candidates ===
- John McHugh, incumbent Mayor (Democratic)
- Paula Pennypacker, anti-tax activist, 1989 candidate for City Council (Republican)

==== Declined ====
- Mike Ferner, City Councilman

=== Results ===
Primary election results
| Party | Candidate | Votes | % |
|---|---|---|---|
| Nonpartisan | John McHugh (inc.) | 19,738 | 49.79% |
| Nonpartisan | Paula Pennypacker | 19,707 | 49.71% |
| Write-in | | 197 | 0.50% |
| Total votes | | 39,642 | 100.00% |

== General election ==
=== Results ===
1991 Toledo mayoral election results
| Party | Candidate | Votes | % |
|---|---|---|---|
| Nonpartisan | John McHugh (inc.) | 53,117 | 59.07% |
| Nonpartisan | Paula Pennypacker | 36,803 | 40.93% |
| Total votes | | 89,920 | 100.00% |
