= 2001 Toledo, Ohio mayoral election =

- November 6, 2001

| Candidate | Jack Ford | Ray Kest |
| Party | Nonpartisan | Nonpartisan |
| Popular vote | 47,831 | 31,163 |
| Percentage | 60.55% | 39.45% |
Mayor before election
Carty Finkbeiner
Nonpartisan
Elected mayor
Jack Ford
Nonpartisan

The 2001 Toledo, Ohio mayoral election took place on November 6, 2001, to elect the mayor of Toledo, Ohio. Incumbent Mayor Carty Finkbeiner was term-limited and could not run for re-election to a second term, and instead explored a run for Governor in 2002. Six candidates ran to succeed him, with two Democrats, State Representative Jack Ford and County Treasurer Ray Kest, emerging as the frontrunners.

Turnout in the primary election, which took place on September 11, 2001, was negatively affected by the terrorist attacks taking place that day, with only 25 percent of voters turning out. Ford and Kest both received 44 percent of the vote, with Ford narrowly beating Kest by 41 votes for first place. In the general election, Ford defeated Kest in a landslide, winning 61 percent of the vote and becoming the city's first Black mayor.

== Primary election ==
=== Candidates ===
- Jack Ford, State Representative (Democratic)
- Ray Kest, County Treasurer (Democratic)
- Rick Grafing, bar owner (independent)
- Armiya Muhammed, security company owner (independent)
- James Harmon, math teacher (independent)
- Opal Covey, former thrift shop owner (independent)

=== Results ===
Primary election results
| Party | Candidate | Votes | % |
|---|---|---|---|
| Nonpartisan | Jack Ford | 20,740 | 44.32% |
| Nonpartisan | Ray Kest | 20,699 | 44.23% |
| Nonpartisan | Rick Grafing | 3,198 | 6.83% |
| Nonpartisan | Armiya Muhammed | 954 | 2.04% |
| Nonpartisan | James Harmon | 826 | 1.76% |
| Nonpartisan | Opal Covey | 384 | 0.82% |
| Total votes | | 46,801 | 100.00% |

== General election ==
=== Results ===
2001 Toledo mayoral election results
| Party | Candidate | Votes | % |
|---|---|---|---|
| Nonpartisan | Jack Ford | 47,831 | 60.55% |
| Nonpartisan | Ray Kest | 31,163 | 39.45% |
| Total votes | | 78,994 | 100.00% |
