= Richard Grossman =

Richard Grossman may refer to:

- Richard Grossman (author) (1943–2011), American anti-globalization writer
- Richard Grossman (bassist) (born 1959), Australian bass guitarist
- Richard Grossman (pianist) (1937–1992), American jazz pianist
- Richard Grossman (publisher) (1921–2014), American publisher
