= Teresa Fedor =

American politician (born 1956)

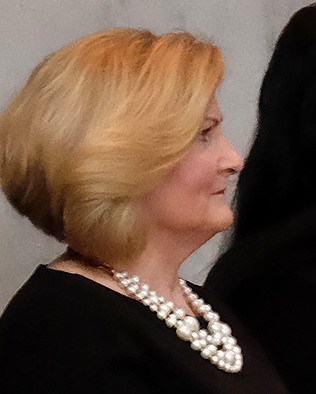

Member of the Ohio State Board of Education from the 2nd district
- Incumbent
- Assumed office January 1, 2023
- Governor: Mike DeWine
- Preceded by: Kirsten Hill

Minority Leader of the Ohio Senate
- In office January 1, 2007 – January 15, 2008
- Preceded by: C. J. Prentiss
- Succeeded by: Ray Miller

Member of the Ohio Senate from the 11th district
- In office January 6, 2019 – October 31, 2022
- Preceded by: Edna Brown
- Succeeded by: Paula Hicks-Hudson
- In office January 6, 2003 – December 31, 2010
- Preceded by: Linda J. Furney
- Succeeded by: Edna Brown

Member of the Ohio House of Representatives from the 45th district
- In office January 3, 2011 – December 31, 2018
- Preceded by: Joe Walter
- Succeeded by: Lisa Sobecki
- In office January 3, 2001 – December 31, 2002
- Preceded by: Jim Mettler
- Succeeded by: Peter Ujvagi

Personal details
- Born: May 2, 1956 (age 70) Toledo, Ohio, U.S.
- Party: Democratic
- Education: University of Toledo (BS)

Teresa Fedor (born May 2, 1956) is an American politician from Ohio. She was a member of the Ohio Senate, representing the 11th district from 2019 until her resignation in 2022. A member of the Ohio General Assembly since 2001, Fedor previously represented the same seat in the Senate from 2003 to 2010, and was a member of the Ohio House of Representatives for five nonconsecutive terms, serving from 2001 to 2002, and again from 2011 to 2018. A Democrat, Fedor represented Toledo and the surrounding areas.

== Life and career ==
Fedor holds a bachelor of science degree in education from the University of Toledo. She served in the U.S. Air Force and Ohio Air National Guard for 6 and a half years.

In 2000, Fedor ran against incumbent Jim Mettler for a seat in the Ohio House, and defeated the incumbent with 55.6% of the vote. She served in the House for a single term. Fedor was named Public Servant of the Year in 2002 by the Ohio Environmental Council.

With incumbent Linda J. Furney unable to run again due to term limits, Fedor opted to run for the Ohio Senate in 2002 instead of seeking a second term in the House. Unopposed in the primary, she defeated Republican Phillip Barbosa with 72.3% of the vote. She served as assistant minority whip in the 125th General Assembly. Fedor won reelection in 2006 unopposed.

For the 127th General Assembly, Fedor's fellow Senate Democrats chose her to serve as Minority Leader. However, in early 2008, Fedor was ousted in a political coup by Senator Ray Miller, who had organized a coalition to replace her with himself. As a result, Fedor served the remainder of her Senate career without a leadership position.

She resigned on October 31, 2022 to focus on her race for the Ohio State Board of Education 2nd District.

== Ohio House of Representatives, Second Tenure ==
In 2009, Fedor stated that she would be a candidate for the Ohio House of Representatives in 2010, to replace the term limited Peter Ujvagi. However, Ujvagi resigned early after he was hired as Lucas County Administrator.

The appointment of Ujvagi set up what many thought was going to be a legislative shuffle, where Fedor was appointed to Ujvagi's seat, and Representative Edna Brown then appointed to Fedor's Senate seat. However, this plan was foiled when Toledo City Councilman Joe McNamara opted also to be appointed to the Senate. As a result, Fedor kept her seat, Brown hers, and Joe Walter was appointed to a nine-month stint in Ujvagi's seat.

Nonetheless, Fedor was elected to the House seat, winning 64.37% of the vote in 2010. She began her first term on January 3, 2011.

== Ohio Senate, Second Tenure ==
In 2018, Fedor opted to again swap chambers and run for her old seat in the state Senate, to succeed Edna Brown who was term-limited. She again won the seat and was sworn into office on January 6, 2019. She resigned on October 31, 2022. She was a moderate Democrat who increasingly voted for conservative legislation at the end of her tenure.

Fedor is also a member of the Ohio Attorney General's Human Trafficking Commission.

== Initiatives, policies and positions ==
=== Human trafficking ===
One of Fedor's landmark legislative victories relates to human trafficking. She has stated, "Traffickers have walked away from the halls of justice," and has vowed to help stop and continue to fight for those victimized as victims. She has received support from former Ohio Governors Ted Strickland and John Kasich on stopping human trafficking, and has successfully passed one measure.

Along with then Ohio Attorney General Mike DeWine, Fedor introduced the safe harbor bill, which would prevent a young person with being charged with prostitution if they were victims of human trafficking. She has stated it is a critical portion of tackling the problem.

=== Education ===
Fedor has also voiced concerns over the elimination of some education measures that would eliminate all-day kindergarten requirements. While new legislation has come forth to give more communities education choices, Fedor has stated that she thinks districts were offered some choice with the waiver for all-day kindergarten that were provided in the past.

=== Economic issues ===
Fedor opposed initiatives to raise funds by selling rights to state lands, including state parks to drill for crude oil and natural gas. "Our picture-perfect parks in Ohio may certainly … be turned into picture-perfect toxic wastelands", she had stated. The General Assembly ultimately voted for allowing for oil exploration on state lands.

=== Abortion ===
On 25 March 2015, Fedor got so frustrated during a debate on abortion in the lower chamber of the state's legislature that she stood up and revealed that she had been raped and terminated the resulting pregnancy. "You don't respect my reason, my rape, my abortion, and I guarantee you there are other women who should stand up with me and be courageous enough to speak," she said. "What you're doing is so fundamentally inhuman, unconstitutional, and I've sat here too long." Fedor was raped many years ago, while she was in the military.

The so-called heartbeat bill that was being discussed in the Ohio legislature at the time would have doctors test for a heartbeat in the fetus, which could be as early as six weeks into the pregnancy. If one is detected, and the doctor proceeds with the abortion, they would face felony charges. If the bill becomes law, it would ban all abortions, except when the pregnancy endangered the mother's life or health, but including cases of rape and incest. The bill passed, 50 votes to 44.

Ohio House of Representatives
Preceded by C. J. Prentiss	Minority Leader of the Ohio Senate; 2007–2008	Succeeded by Ray Miller
