= POCLAD =

Organization

The Program on Corporations, Law, and Democracy (POCLAD) is an activist collective of 11 members (with three leaving, making 14.), who research the history of corporations in the United States. POCLAD was formed in 1995 to examine the legal and historical foundations of corporate authority in the United States and to promote democratic approaches to corporate power. They are some of the main circulators of the notion that corporate personhood—which gives corporations some of the same legal rights as real human beings—is at the center of the problems regarding corporations. They also publish a newsletter three times a year called By What Authority (ISSN 1524-1106) English for quo warranto, a legal phrase that questions illegitimate exercise of privilege and power, which they claim reflects an unabashed assertion of the right of the sovereign people to govern themselves.

== Collective members ==
- David Cobb
- Greg Coleridge
- Karen Coulter
- Mike Ferner
- Dave Henson
- Ward Morehouse
- Lewis Pitts
- Jim Price
- Virginia Rasmussen
- Kaitlin Sopoci-Belknap
- Mary Zepernick

== Former members ==
- Richard Grossman
- Peter Kellman
- Jane Anne Morris

== See also ==
- Ohio Committee on Corporations, Law, and Democracy
- Democracy Unlimited of Humboldt County
