= Peter Ujvagi =

American politician

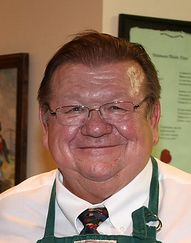

Member of the Ohio House of Representatives from the 47th district
- In office January 3, 2003 – March 19, 2010
- Preceded by: Teresa Fedor
- Succeeded by: Joe Walter

Personal details
- Born: March 31, 1949 (age 77) Budapest, Hungary
- Party: Democratic
- Profession: Manufacturing, Field Coordinator

Peter Sandor Ujvagi (Hungarian Újvági Péter Sándor; 31 March 1949) is a retired Hungarian-born Democratic politician in Toledo and Lucas County, Ohio. He has been a Toledo City Council member, a representative in the Ohio House of Representatives, and the Lucas County administrator.

== Life and career ==
His nickname is "Mayor of East Toledo", a part of the city with a strong Hungarian-American and other Eastern European-descended population.

Ujvagi was born in Budapest, Hungary on 31 March 1949 as son of Ede and Magda Újvági. After the Hungarian Revolution of 1956, he emigrated with his parents to the United States, as a 7 year old. He has two brothers, Ed and Charles. After a short stay in an Austrian refugee camp, the family arrived in Toledo, Ohio.

He is a founding member and executive committee member of the Hungarian-American Coalition. He is active in the Hungarian Club of Greater Toledo, the Birmingham Cultural Center, and he is on the Board of Directors for the Art Commission of Greater Toledo. He was a member of the American delegation to the state funeral of Hungarian Prime Minister József Antall (1993).

== Politics ==
In the 1970s, Ujvagi began working in neighborhood development, both in Toledo and at a national level with the National Center for Urban Ethnic Affairs and the National Campaign for Human Development. President Jimmy Carter appointed him to the National Commission on Neighborhoods.

He was first elected to Toledo city council in 1981 and served continuously until 2002, elected first from his East Toledo district and later to an at-large seat. He was council president from 1998 to 2002.

After Teresa Fedor ran for the Ohio Senate in 2002, Ujvagi ran for the vacant 47th District seat in the Ohio House of Representatives, and won with 67.76% of the vote. He would win reelection in 2004 with 71.22%, again in 2006 with 73.85%, and in 2008 as an unopposed candidate.

While in the legislature, Ujvagi was very influential on budgetary issues, and for a time served as Chairman of the House Finance Committee's Transportation Subcommittee.

On 17 March 2010, Ujvagi resigned his seat in the Ohio House of Representatives to become the new Lucas County Administrator. He was succeeded by Joe Walter.

He later returned to Toledo city council, where he again represented East Toledo from 2016 to 2020, when he retired from politics.

== Sources ==
- Peter Ujvagi's biography
- "Toledo area offered haven for refugees of crushed revolt"
