= Michael Ashford =

American politician (born 1955)

Member of the Ohio House of Representatives from the 44th district
- In office January 3, 2011 – December 31, 2018
- Preceded by: Edna Brown
- Succeeded by: Paula Hicks-Hudson

Personal details
- Born: September 15, 1955 (age 70) Toledo, Ohio, U.S.
- Party: Democratic
- Education: University of Nebraska–Lincoln Spring Arbor University
- Profession: Community Organizer

Michael Ashford (born September 15, 1955) is the former Minority Whip of the Ohio House of Representatives. He represented more than 116,000 constituents in a district wholly within the city of Toledo.

== Career ==
Ashford, raised in Toledo, studied sociology at the University of Nebraska–Lincoln and has a master's degree from Spring Arbor University. He has spent his career working to organize the community through the YMCA and the Boys and Girls Clubs. Ashford began his political career as a member of the Toledo City Council, first appointed in 2002, and serving until 2010. As a Toledo City Councilman representing District 4, Michael Ashford was first appointed to Council in January 2002, and then was honored by the support of District 4 residents in a special election and two general elections in 2003 and 2007 and served as president of Toledo City Council during 2007. He served as the chairman of the Public Utilities Committee during his Council service and campaigned for the passage of issue 79. Issue 79 was a ten-year lawsuit by U.S. EPA against the City of Toledo to address and correct aging in fracture, sewage discharge, and combined sewer overflows. The project started in 2003 and will be completed by 2018, improving the quality of water there for improving the quality of life. He also oversaw the creation of a major entertainment district in Downtown Toledo. Then Councilman Ashford tackled major budget issues while working closely with community development corporations and neighborhood organizations to secure dwindling government resources.

== Ohio House of Representatives ==
With incumbent Edna Brown unable to seek reelection to the House due to term limits, Ashford entered the race. He was unopposed in the primary, and beat Republican Carolyn Eyre in the general election by 15,000 votes. Ashford was sworn into his first term on January 3, 2011. He served on the committees of Finance and Appropriations where he was the Ranking Member of the Agriculture and Development subcommittee, Insurance, and Public Utilities, and the Ohio Commission on Fatherhood.

== Committee assignments ==
- House Committee on Finance and Appropriations
- House Committee on Public Utilities
- House Committee on Insurance
- House Committee on Rules and Reference
- Joint Legislative Ethics Commission

== Policies and initiatives ==
Ashford was critical of the Ohio Republican Party plan to end collective bargaining for state employees. "I think they think that by doing this they're going to create jobs and welcome home people," he said. "I don't know where they got their business philosophy, because this will have a devastating financial impact on the state."

== Lucas County Democratic Party Chairman ==
On June 2, 2020, Ashford was elected Chairman of the Lucas County Democratic Party. On March 31, 2023, Ashford resigned as Chairman of the Lucas County Democratic Party.
