= Ward Morehouse (activist) =

- Born: March 26, 1929
- Died: June 30, 2012 (aged 83)
- Education: Yale University

Ward Morehouse (26 March 1929 – June 30, 2012) was an anti-corporate activist. He also fought for the victims of the Bhopal disaster.

Morehouse had dedicated over five decades of his life to activism, starting off as the founder of the Center for International and Comparative Studies, and then publishing textbooks for the New York State Education Department which aimed at helping students better understand foreigners. Next Morehouse founded the Council on International and Public Affairs (CIPA) a not-for-profit human rights organization where he first heard about the Bhopal disaster.

Morehouse contributed significantly to the struggle for justice in Bhopal, founding the International Campaign for Justice in Bhopal (ICJB) as well as authoring several key books about the gas disaster. Morehouse relentlessly hounded Union Carbide to take responsibility for the disaster- in shareholder meetings, in the courts, in international human-rights tribunals, in the newspapers, and in the streets. He has kept close contact with victims' advocates in Bhopal and organized coalitions of U.S. medical, scientific, environmental, church, and labor groups to keep the pressure on Union Carbide.

Morehouse was also co-founder of Programs on Corporations, Law and Democracy (POCLAD) an American anti-corporate research collective.
