= Peter Kellman =

American activist

Peter Kellman (born 1946 in Brooklyn, New York) is a lifelong trade union activist who participated in the Civil rights and Anti-war movements of the 1960s, the anti-nuclear/safe-energy, environmental movements of the 1970/80s and is currently part of the New Agriculture Movement of the twenty-first century. He has lived most of his life in Maine. His mother brought him to his first picket line in a baby carriage at a bank where workers were striking management for not recognizing their union. It was the bank Kellman's Grandfather used, but not that day.

His parents and their friends were the radical activists of their day: communists, socialist and trade unionist. At the dinner table and family get togethers they talked the politics of a just and sane world. The Kellman family moved to Salem, NH in 1952 where he attended grade school and then on to Sanford, Maine in 1959 where he went to High School. In 1963 he attended the University of Maine where he played football and dropped out after finishing his freshman year. In the Fall of 1964 he worked for Helen and Scott Nearing on their homestead in Harbourside, Maine. In early 1965 he went to work for the Committee for Non-Violent Action (CNVA) in Voluntown, Connecticut where he participated in and organized demonstrations against the Vietnam War. When the US started bombing North Vietnam, CNVA sent Kellman to Washington, DC to organize demonstrations against the bombing.

Shortly after returning from DC, CNVA sent Kellman to represent them on the civil rights march from Selma to Montgomery. On the March, Kellman directed a crew of 50 seminarians to set up the tent sites for the marchers. He stayed in Selma after the March and helped build a Free Library. Later in 1965 Kellman volunteered with the Student Nonviolent Coordinating Committee (SNCC) in Alabama to help organize independent political parties out of which the call for Black Power came. Kellman worked in Sumter County, Alabama on that project.

Returning North after his work for SNCC, Kellman helped organize the anti-draft movement and the Assembly of Unrepresented People in Washington, DC which was the first mass arrest demonstration against the Vietnam War. In 1967, Kellman went into exile in Canada and was arrested for violation of the Selective Service Act on his return to the United States in 1973. Charges against him were later dropped by the Federal Attorney prosecuting Kellman's case.

== Labor movement activism ==
In 1976, Kellman was working in the rubber mill portion of the Converse shoe factory in North Berwick, Maine. He led the attempt to form a union among his 500 co-workers. The organizing effort was unsuccessful and Kellman was fired but later won a National Labor Relations Board case against the company. The effect the company's anti-union effort had on him was a radicalizing one and Kellman became more and more involved in the labor union activities.

Kellman also became involved in the anti-nuclear/safe energy movement. In 1977, he worked with the Clamshell Alliance to build public support against the operation of commercial nuclear power plants in New Hampshire and Maine, and he participated in mass arrest demonstrations in opposition to construction of the Seabrook Station Nuclear Power Plant in New Hampshire.

In 1979, Kellman went to work at the Laconia Shoe Shop in Sanford, Maine, where he was elected president of Local 82, Shoe Division, of the Amalgamated Clothing and Textile Workers Union. As president of the local, he was ordered by the company to remove from the union bulletin board a leaflet asking workers to vote to shut down a nuclear power plant in Maine. Kellman and two other members of the local were arrested for refusing to leave the factory after being suspended. However, after the entire shop came out in support of the arrested workers, the company caved and brought the three of them back with pay and told Kellman hereafter they could put whatever they wanted on the union bulletin board.

In 1980, Kellman became active with the Maine AFL-CIO. He was appointed the chair of the Maine AFL-CIO Committee on Run-Away Shops and worked on the implementation of, and improvement of, Maine's first-in-the-nation run-away shop law under which Maine workers received notice of plant closing and severance pay.

Kellman later joined the painter's union, where he held the position of steward. In 1984, he was the campaign manager on a congressional campaign in New Hampshire's First District, after which he returned to Maine, and in 1986 he went to work for the Maine AFL-CIO getting union members involved in legislative races.

In early 1987, the Maine AFL-CIO had Kellman work on the lockout of workers at the Simplex Wire and Cable Plant in Newington, New Hampshire, which employed many workers who lived in Maine.

== 1987–1988 International Paper strike ==
Following the Simplex Lockout Kellman was assigned to work with the unions at the International Paper Company in Jay, Maine who were instructed by their national union, the United Paperworkers International Union (UPIU), to prepare their 1250 members to strike when their contract ran out on June 16, 1987. At that time the Jay workers joined the locals locked out in Mobile, Alabama and struck with workers at IP mills in Lockhaven, Pennsylvania and De Pere, Wisconsin. Kellman's instinct for building solidarity and his organizational skills "turned a routine strike into a crusade marked by rallies, marches, and emotional meetings." in that strike. Local 14 of the UPIU faced demands which, on the face of it, seemed unbelievable. Among IP's demands were the elimination of overtime pay on Sunday, no more Christmas Day holiday, the elimination of 156 jobs, the contracting out of all maintenance work which would have eliminated 350 jobs and what amounted to the elimination of the grievance procedure. The local union, however, had little history of member activism outside of their executive board. However, the summer prior the start of the strike, Kellman had begun the process of educating and organizing the mill workers into a successful "class-based social movement." Kellman brought to the labor movement in Jay what he learned from the Civil Rights Movement of the 1960s what the Civil Rights Movement got from the Labor Movement of the 1930s.

Every week for 16 months the strikers held a mass meeting attended by over 1,000 people. During the first two months of the strike, International Paper Company permanently replaced the entire union workforce. However the strikers continued and the strike by IP's workers in Jay generated international attention and they had a bill introduced in Congress to ban striker replacement. President Bill Clinton promised to sign the legislation if it passed Congress. The bill passed the House but the two Democrats in the Senate from Arkansas voted against it and the bill was defeated by two votes never making its way to the President. Many in the labor movement, including Kellman, argued that UPIU had "sold out" Local 14. The strikers held out for 16 months until October 1988 when the UPIU's International President, Wayne Glen, reversed his position and agreed to sign contracts at other IP locations, thus isolating the striking locals. To help explain the context in which the strike was lost, Kellman wrote a history of the unions in the paper mills called "Divide We Fall," published in 2004. After the strike Kellman became director of the newly formed New Hampshire Coalition for Occupational Safety and Health. While working in New Hampshire, Kellman was involved in a bad car accident after which he returned to college and received a BA in Labor Studies from the University of Massachusetts.

== Program on Corporations Law and Democracy ==
As a researcher for the Program on Corporations, Law, and Democracy,(POCLAD), Kellman researched and wrote about the history of the labor movement and the legal, political, economic, cultural and democracy killing effect of corporate power from a working class perspective. While at POCLAD he wrote a number of insightful articles which were published in their journal, "By What Authority", and their book "Defying Corporations, Defining Democracy".

== Other ==
Kellman initiated the "Jay-Livermore Falls Working Class History Project" out of which came the book "Pain on their Faces," a series of essays by participants in the Jay Strike of 1987/88.

He taught several Labor History courses at Heartwood College of Art in Kennebunk, Maine and the University of Southern Maine in Portland, Maine.

Kellman served as President of the Southern Maine Labor Council and was given the title of President Emeritus when he retired as president. Kellman represented the council on the executive board of the Maine AFL-CIO. He is presently on the executive board of the Southern Maine Labor Council.

Kellman helped develop the Workers Rights Platform of the Labor Party and his booklet, Building Unions was a product of his work with the Labor Party.

== Agriculture in the 21st century ==
Kellman and his wife Rebekah Yonan are currently engaged in trying to grow all their nutritional and caloric needs using primarily human labor. He is also studying and beginning to organizing around the cultural side of agriculture. In a way he has come full circle from 1964 when he worked for Helen and Scott Nearing, many consider the parents of the 1960s back-to-the-land movement.

== Memberships and awards ==
Peter Kellman is a member of the National Writers Union, Local 1981 of the United Auto Workers, AFL-CIO. He has previously been in the following unions: International Brotherhood of Painters and Allied Trades, the International Brotherhood of Electrical Workers, United Food and Commercial Workers, the American Federation of Teachers, the Amalgamated Clothing and Textile Workers Union and Chaired the Labor Parties Maine Chapter.

In 2002, Kellman was named a co-recipient of the 2002 Stringfellow Awards for Justice and Peace, given by the Chaplain's Office at Bates College in honor of peace activist, theologian and lawyer William Stringfellow.

INSERT: His Portrait is part of the "Americans Who Tell the Truth" collection.

== Published works ==
- Kellman, Peter. Building Unions. Croton-on-Hudson, N.Y.: Apex Press, 2001). ISBN 1-891843-09-5.
- Kellman, Peter. Divided We Fall: The Story of the Paperworkers' Union and the Future of Labor. Croton-on-Hudson, N.Y.: Apex Press, 2004. ISBN 1-891843-23-0
- Kellman, Peter, ed. Pain On Their Faces: Testimonies on the Paper Mill Strike, Jay, Maine, 1987-1988. Croton-on-Hudson, N.Y.: Apex Press, 1998. ISBN 0-945257-96-1
- Kellman, Peter and Bruno, Ed. "Toward a New Labor Rights Movement." WorkingUSA. Spring 2001.

== Notes ==
- POCLAD is a project of the Council on International and Public Affairs (CIPA).
