= Ohio's 11th senatorial district =

American legislative district

Ohio's 11th State Senate district
Senator
Paula Hicks-Hudson; D–Toledo
- Demographics: 60.8% White; 27.4% Black; 8.4% Hispanic; 2% Asian; 2.3% Native American; 0.1% Hawaiian/Pacific Islander
- Population (2020) • Voting age • Citizens of voting age: 342,626; 266,327; 262,316

During the redistricting in 2023 Ohio's 11th senatorial district was redrawn and now comprises the northern section of Lucas County and is primarily the City of Toledo. The district is now made up of the House Districts of 43, 44, and 45.

The district's current senator is Democrat Paula Hicks-Hudson and was reelected for another term in November 2026.

== 2026 election results ==
Paula Hicks-Hudson (D) 71,502 66,6%

James Nowak (R) 32,277 30,0%

Kenneth Sharp (L) 3,647 3.4%

== Historically ==
Before the 2023 redistricting, the 11th senatorial district was based in greater Toledo, Ohio and consisted of about three-fourths of Lucas County. It encompasses Ohio House districts 44, 45 and 46. It has a Cook PVI of D+11.

== List of senators ==
Senator	Party	Term	Notes
Frank W. King	Democrat	January 3, 1959 – January 13, 1969	King resigned in 1969 prior to the expiration to his term.
Marigene Valiquette	Democrat	January 14, 1969 – December 31, 1986	Valiquette did not seek re-election in 1986.
Linda J. Furney	Democrat	January 2, 1987 – December 31, 2002	Furney was term-limited in 2002.
Teresa Fedor	Democrat	January 3, 2003 – December 31, 2011	Fedor was term-limited in 2010.
Edna Brown	Democrat	January 3, 2011 – December 31, 2018	Brown was term-limited in 2018.
Teresa Fedor	Democrat	January 1, 2019 - December 31, 2022	
Paula Hicks-Hudson	Democrat	January 1, 2023 – present	Incumbent.
