= Joe Walter (politician) =

American politician

Joseph Walter

Member of the Ohio House of Representatives from the 47th district
- In office March 24, 2010-December 31, 2010
- Preceded by: Peter Ujvagi
- Succeeded by: Teresa Fedor

Personal details
- Born: April 30, 1947 (age 79) Toledo, Ohio
- Party: Democratic

Joe Walter (born April 30, 1947) is a former member of the Ohio House of Representatives, who represented the 47th District briefly in 2010. He was appointed following the resignation of Peter Ujvagi, who resigned to take the position of Lucas County Administrator.

While Ujvagi was initially expected to run for the Ohio Senate, he was hired as Lucas County Administrator.

The appointment of Ujvagi set up what many thought was going to be a legislative shuffle, where Teresa Fedor would be appointed to Ujvagi's seat, and Edna Brown then appointed to Fedor's seat. However, Toledo City Councilman Joe McNamara also sought the appointment to the Senate. As a result, Fedor kept her seat, Brown hers, and Walter was appointed to a nine-month stint in Ujvagi's seat.

Vowing not to run for a full term, Fedor won the seat in the 2010 general election, and replaced Walter in 2011. Following his time in the legislature, Walter retired.
