= 2015 Boise mayoral election =

- November 3, 2015
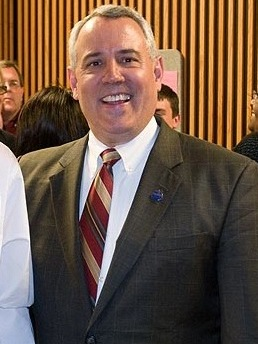

Candidate	Dave Bieter	Judy Peavey-Derr
Party	Nonpartisan	Nonpartisan
Popular vote	17,857	7,199
Percentage	67.70%	27.29%
Mayor before election
Dave Bieter
Democratic
Elected Mayor
Dave Bieter
Democratic

The 2015 Boise mayoral election was held on November 3, 2015, to determine the mayor of Boise, Idaho. The election was officially nonpartisan.

== Background ==
Bieter was initially regarded as the strongly favored candidate, as he was seeking a fourth term and had won by a three-to-one margin in the 2011 election. Sven Berg, writing for the Idaho Statesman, wrote in September 2015 that "There might be a current of dissatisfaction with Bieter running through parts of Boise, but come election time, it hasn’t yet showed up in the votes. Beating him will take a lot of work."

== Results ==
Results
Candidate	Votes	%
Dave Bieter	17,857	67.70
Judy Peavey-Derr	7,199	27.29
Seth M. Holden	1,242	4.71
Write-in	78	0.30
Total votes	26,376	
