= 2015 Denver mayoral election =

- May 5, 2015
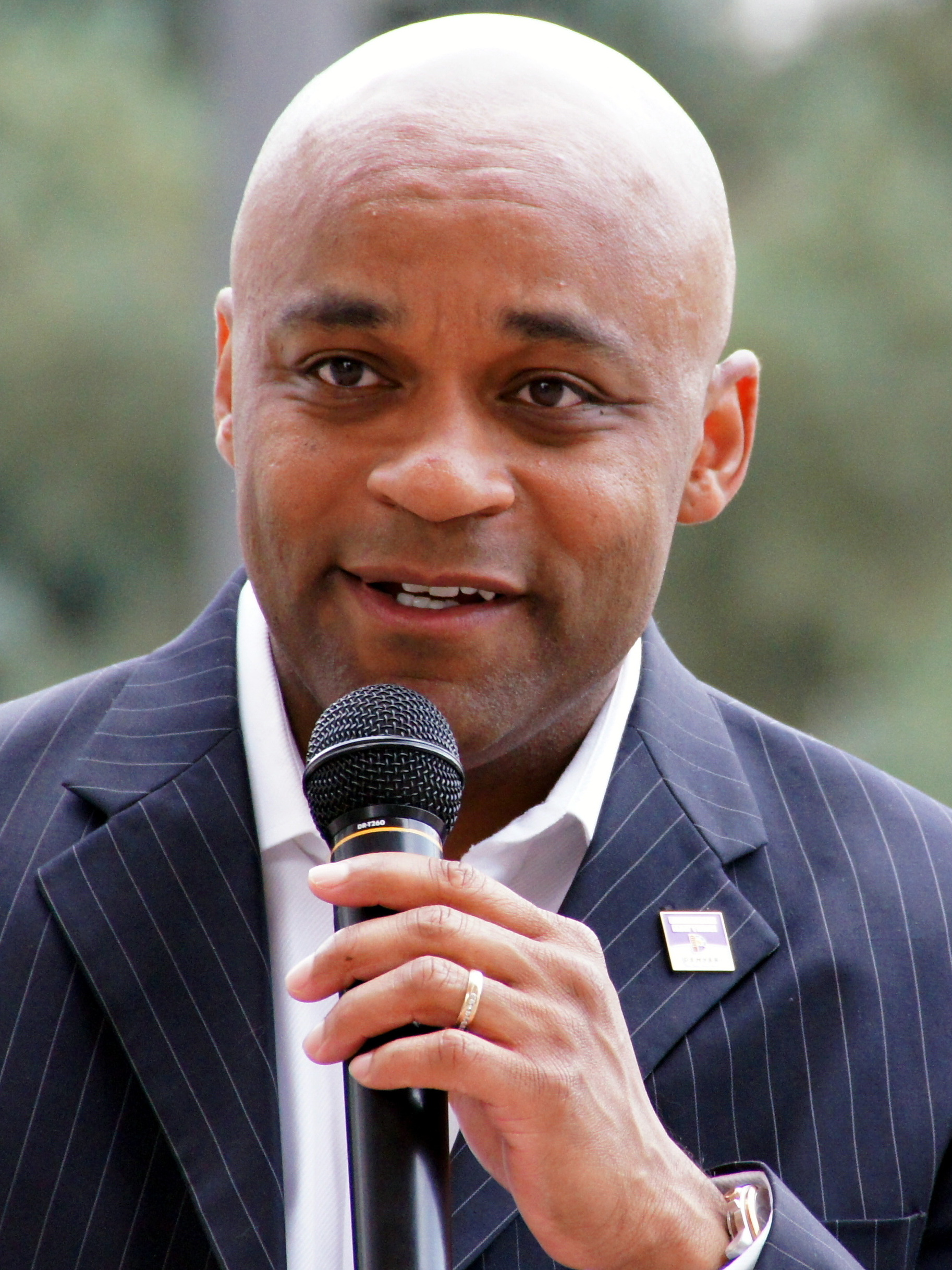

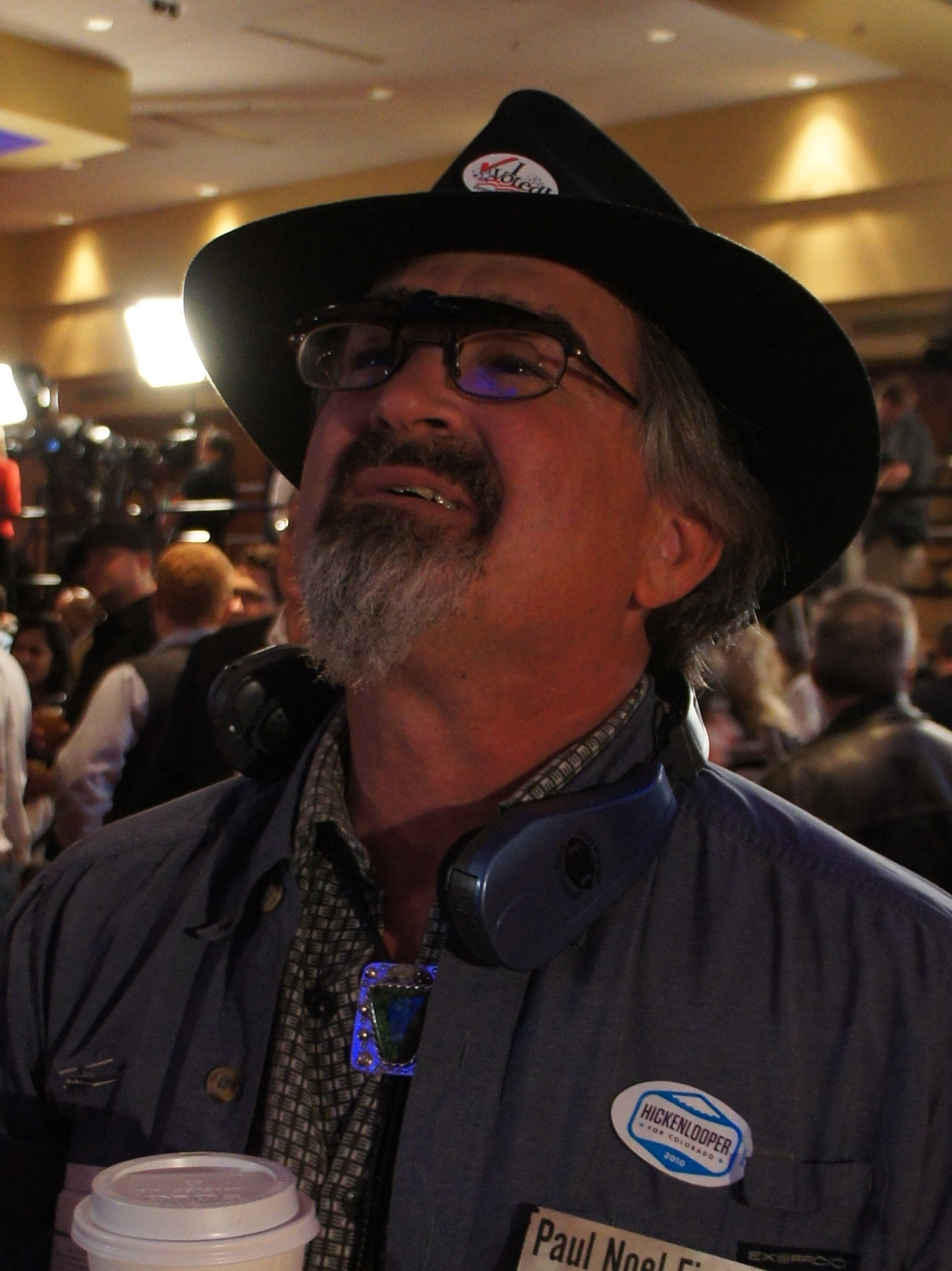
Candidate	Michael Hancock	Marcus Giavanni	Paul Noel Fiorino
Party	Nonpartisan	Nonpartisan	Nonpartisan
Popular vote	75,774	8,033	5,379
Percentage	80.1%	8.5%	5.6%
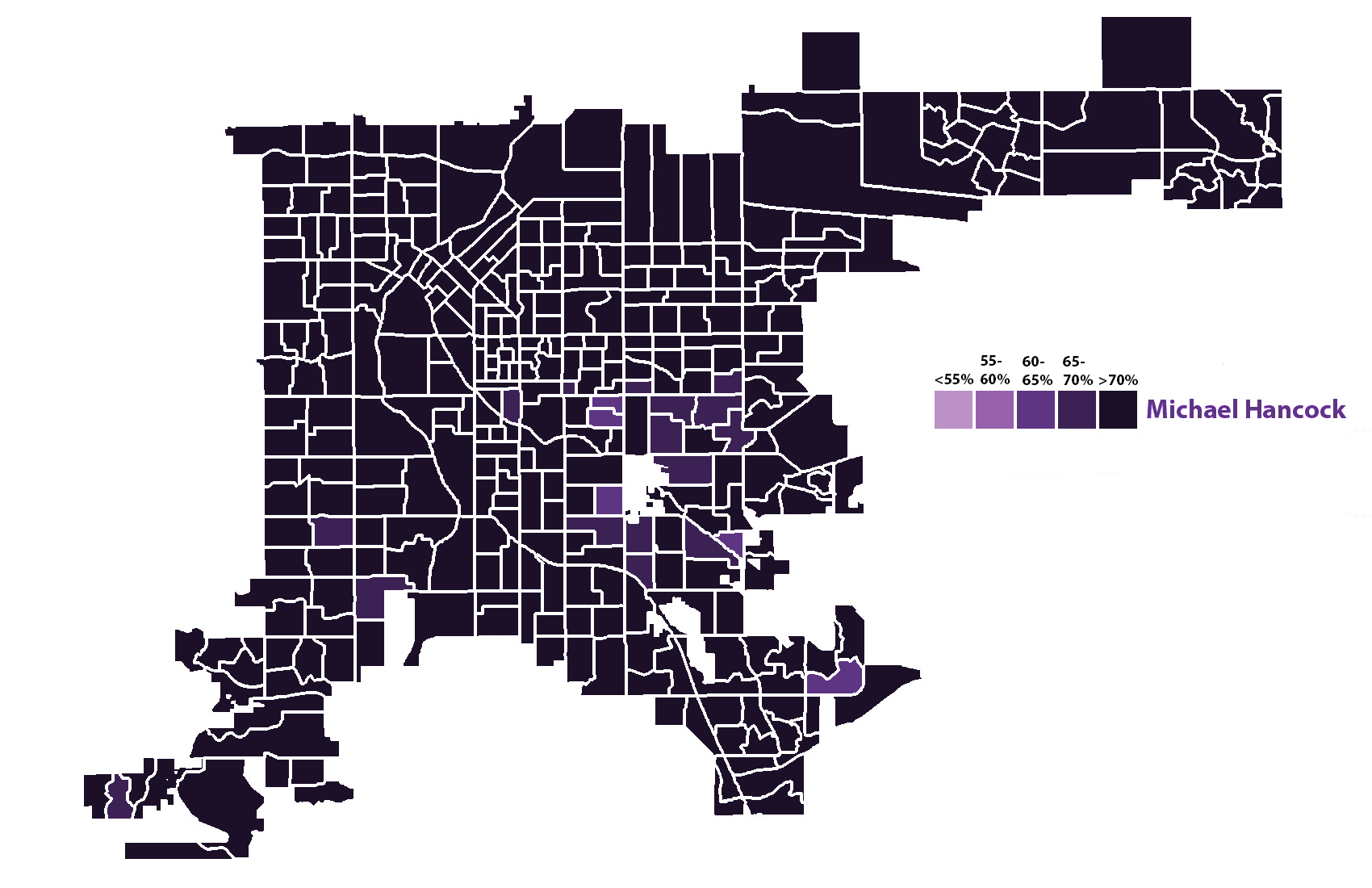
Mayor before election
Michael Hancock
Nonpartisan
Elected mayor
Michael Hancock
Nonpartisan

The 2015 Denver mayoral election took place on May 5, 2015. Incumbent Michael Hancock ran for re-election and won. His nearest competitor, Marcus Giavanni, had about 8.5 percent. This was the first time in 20 years that Denver did not hold a Mayoral Debate and was called off by League of Women Voters of Denver.

== Candidates ==
- Michael Hancock
- Marcus Giavanni
- Seku
- Paul Noel Fiorino
- Write-in

== Results ==
Candidates	General Election	
	Votes	%
Michael B. Hancock	75,774	80.1
Marcus Giavanni	8,033	8.5
Paul Noel Fiorino	5,379	5.6
Seku	2,973	3.1
Write-In	2366	2.5
Larry Ambrose	2,235	2.3
Brad K. Evans	101	0.1
Scott Hoftiezer	20	0
Total	94,525	100
