= Richard Grossman (author) =

American philosopher

- Born: August 10, 1943
- Died: November 22, 2011 (aged 68)
- Occupations: Author, Lecturer

Richard L. Grossman (August 10, 1943 – November 22, 2011) was best known for his work challenging the legality of corporate authority. According to Ralph Nader he 'pioneered the rediscovery of American corporate charter history'. He was the former Executive Director of Greenpeace USA, founder of Environmentalists for Full Employment, and former co-director of the Program on Corporations, Law and Democracy (POCLAD). He was co-author of Taking Care of Business: Citizenship and the Charter of Incorporation and Fear at Work. He lectured and organized widely on issues of corporate power, environmental justice, labor rights, and democracy.

Grossman attended Columbia University, graduating in 1965. He then served as a Peace Corps volunteer in the Philippines. In 1968, he signed the "Writers and Editors War Tax Protest" pledge, vowing to refuse tax payments in protest against the Vietnam War.

== See also ==
- Corporate personhood
