= Paula Hicks-Hudson =

American politician (born 1951)

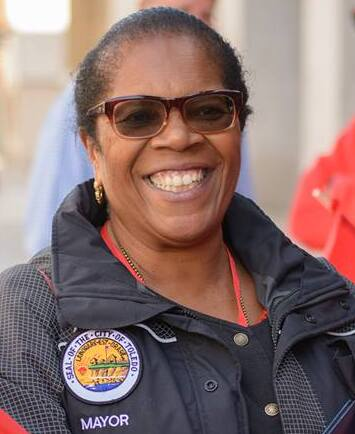

Member of the Ohio Senate from the 11th district
- Incumbent
- Assumed office November 16, 2022
- Preceded by: Teresa Fedor

Member of the Ohio House of Representatives from the 44th District
- In office January 7, 2019 – November 16, 2022
- Preceded by: Michael Ashford
- Succeeded by: Elgin Rogers Jr.

63rd Mayor of Toledo
- In office February 1, 2015 – January 2, 2018
- Preceded by: D. Michael Collins
- Succeeded by: Wade Kapszukiewicz

Member of the Toledo City Council from 4th district
- In office January 2011 – February 1, 2015

Personal details
- Born: Paula Hicks; May 28, 1951 (age 75) Hamilton, Ohio, U.S.
- Party: Democratic
- Spouse: Freeman Hudson
- Children: Patricia and Leah Hudson
- Education: Spelman College (BA); Colorado State University (MA); University of Iowa (JD)
- Website: https://paulahickshudson.com/

Paula S. Hicks-Hudson (born May 28, 1951) is an American politician who has served as a member of the Ohio Senate from the 11th district since 2022. She is the former Mayor of Toledo, Ohio.

== Early life and education ==
Hicks-Hudson was born in Hamilton, Ohio. She earned a Bachelor of Arts from Spelman College, Master of Arts from Colorado State University, and Juris Doctor from the University of Iowa College of Law.

== Career ==
She was admitted in the Ohio State Bar Association in 1982 and specialized in business and education Law, as well as Social Security and Working Disability before entering public office.

Hicks-Hudson was appointed to the Toledo City Council in 2011, representing the 4th district, after Michael Ashford vacated the seat when he was elected to the Ohio General Assembly. She ran in the special election in May 2011, and again in the general election in November 2011, winning both to retain her seat. In 2013, her council colleagues voted for her to replace council President Joe McNamara when he resigned to run for mayor.

While serving as Toledo city council president, she was sworn in as acting mayor after her predecessor Mike Collins suffered from cardiac arrest. She served in this office for several days until Collins died, at which point she ascended to the office of mayor. Hicks-Hudson became only the second woman to lead the city of Toledo, and the first African American woman to serve as mayor. Toledo held a special election in November 2015 to fill the seat for the rest of the term. On March 18, 2015 Hicks-Hudson announced her candidacy for the November 2015 mayoral election.

Hicks-Hudson won the special election to serve the remainder of the term on November 3, 2015. However, she later lost her bid for re-election on November 7, 2017 to fellow Democrat and Lucas County Treasurer Wade Kapszukiewicz.

== Electoral history ==
=== 2011 ===
Toledo City Council District 4 Special Election, May 3, 2011
Candidate		Votes	%	±
✓	Paula Hicks-Hudson	484	70.86%	
	Terry Shankland	102	14.93%	
	Alfonso Narvaez	97	14.20%	

Toledo City Council District 4 General Election, November 8, 2011
Candidate		Votes	%	±
✓	Paula Hicks-Hudson	5062	70.87%	+0.01%
	Anita Rios	2081	29.13%	

=== 2015 ===
Toledo mayoral election, 2015
Party	Candidate	Votes	%
Democratic	Paula Hicks-Hudson (inc.)	23,087	35.6
Nonpartisan	Michael Bell	11,228	17.3
Democratic	Carty Finkbeiner	10,276	15.9
Nonpartisan	Sandy D. Collins	9,432	14.6
Nonpartisan	Sandy Sprang	7,028	10.8
Nonpartisan	Mike Ferner	3,208	5.0
Republican	Opal Covey	544	0.8
Total votes		64,803	100

Political offices
Preceded by D. Michael Collins	Mayor of Toledo, Ohio; 2015–2018	Succeeded by Wade Kapszukiewicz
