= John Berdan =

American politician

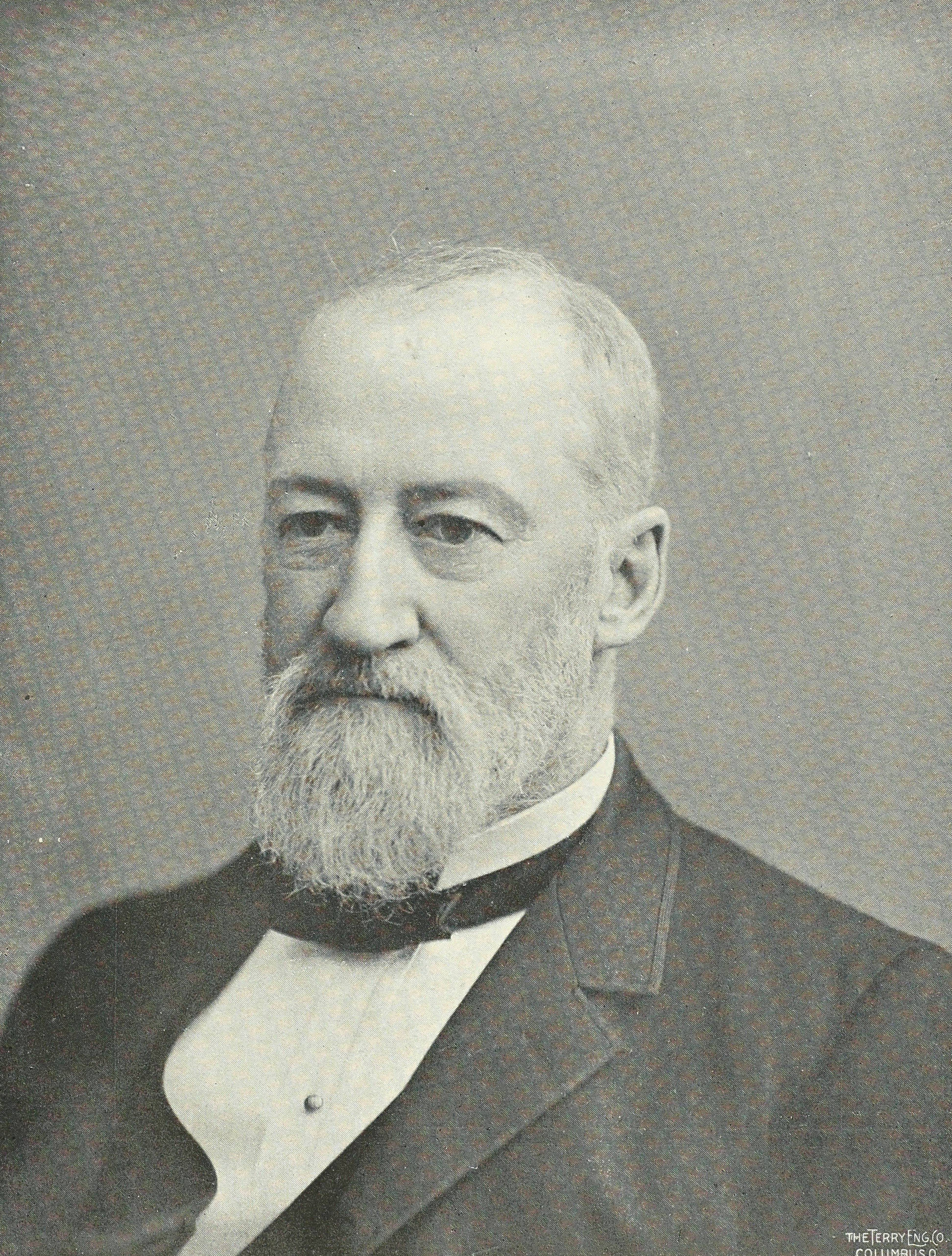
- John Berdan, from "Men of northwestern Ohio. A collection of portraits and biographies of well known men in this section of the professional, business and commercial world" 1898

1st Mayor of Toledo, Ohio
- In office 1837–1839
- Preceded by: Office established
- Succeeded by: Hezekiah D. Mason

Personal details
- Born: December 16, 1798; New York City, U.S.
- Died: October 11, 1841 (aged 42)
- Resting place: Woodlawn Cemetery, Toledo, Ohio, U.S.
- Political party: Whig
- Profession: Politician, businessman, judge

John Berdan (December 16, 1798 – October 11, 1841) was the first mayor of Toledo, Ohio and served two terms in office from 1837 to 1839.

Berdan was born in New York City and lived in Brunswick, Ohio until he moved to Toledo in 1835.

Beside his civic duties he was a local businessman and served as Associate Judge of the Court of Common Pleas for Lucas County from 1839 to 1841.

== Legacy ==
In 1901 the Berdan Building opened and was named after the city's first mayor.
