= Jack Ford (American politician) =

American politician

59th Mayor of Toledo
- In office 2002 – January 3, 2006
- Preceded by: Carty Finkbeiner
- Succeeded by: Carty Finkbeiner

Member of the Ohio House of Representatives from the 49th district
- In office January 3, 1995 – December 31, 2001
- Preceded by: Casey Jones
- Succeeded by: Edna Brown

Personal details
- Born: John Marshall Ford; May 18, 1947 Springfield, Ohio, U.S.
- Died: March 21, 2015 (aged 67) Toledo, Ohio, U.S.
- Party: Democratic
- Spouse: Cynthia Ford

John Marshall Ford (May 18, 1947 – March 21, 2015) was an American Democratic politician who served as the mayor of Toledo, Ohio, from January 2002 to January 2006. Ford was Toledo's first African-American mayor.

== Biography ==
A graduate of Ohio State University, Ford received his master's degree in public administration and his law degree from the University of Toledo. He spent most of his working life as an educator, teaching primarily at the University of Toledo for 22 years, but also at Bowling Green State University and Owens Community College.

In November 1987, Ford was elected to the Toledo City Council.

Ford served in the Ohio House of Representatives for seven years, and was Democratic leader of the Ohio House for the final three. He was a speaker at the 2000 Democratic National Convention. In November 2001, he was elected Toledo mayor, replacing another Democrat, Carty Finkbeiner who, four years later, on November 8, 2005, was returned to office, defeating Ford in his re-election bid.

On March 7, 2006, media reports revealed that Ford would be returning to Bowling Green State University as a practitioner-in-residence in the College of Arts and Sciences effective March 13, 2006. According to reports, Ford will mostly teach in the department of political science.

In June 2007, Ford was selected to fill a vacancy on the Toledo Board of Education.

In his public career as a legislator and city executive, Ford was responsible for the creation of the Toledo Youth Commission, the lead abatement program, the medication education for the elderly program, the Toledo curfew law, and the drug paraphernalia law.

He founded two organizations dealing with drug and alcohol addiction.

He was also a member of Omega Psi Phi fraternity.

Ford died the morning of March 21, 2015 at the age of 67.

Political offices
Preceded by Carty Finkbeiner	Mayor of Toledo, Ohio; 2002–2005	Succeeded by Carty Finkbeiner
