= John McHugh (Ohio politician) =

American politician (1930–2015)

57th Mayor of Toledo
- In office 1990–1993
- Preceded by: Donna Owens
- Succeeded by: Carty Finkbeiner

Personal details
- Born: October 1, 1930 Toledo, Ohio, U.S.
- Died: January 30, 2015 (aged 84) Maumee, Ohio, U.S.
- Party: Democratic

John McHugh (October 1, 1930 – January 30, 2015) was an American Democratic politician who served as the mayor of Toledo, Ohio, from 1990 to 1993.

His daughter is Molly McHugh Branyan, a previous Democratic candidate to the Toledo City Council.

McHugh died of cancer on January 30, 2015, at the age of 84.
