= Mike Ferner =

American activist

- Occupations: Activist; author
- Military career
- Allegiance: United States
- Branch: United States Navy
- Service years: 1969-1973

Mike Ferner is a former Toledo City Council member, Vietnam era veteran, author, and peace activist. He is a member of the POCLAD collective. Toledo had the most active campaign in the country for municipal public power in the late 1980s and early '90s. In 1989 Ferner was elected as an independent to the city council and proposed the creation of a small municipal utility to compete with Toledo Edison. He ran for mayor in 1993 with this as a major campaign plank, but lost by 672 out of 92,740 votes cast.

In March 2006 Ferner, along with fellow activists Pete Perry, Malachy Kilbride, and David Barrows, interrupted the US House Appropriations Committee that was in the process of voting on $67,000,000,000 in military funding for the US war and occupation of Iraq and Afghanistan.

Ferner was arrested on June 30, 2006 at the Jesse Brown Veterans' Administration Medical Center. (Ferner was at the center because he was participating in Voices For Creative Nonviolence's 320-mile "Walk for Justice" from Springfield, Illinois to North Chicago, Illinois.) According to Ferner's recounting of the incident, the arresting officer stated that wearing a "Veterans for Peace" T-shirt while drinking coffee at the center comprised protesting, and Ferner was required to leave the premises. Ferner refused, and was subsequently arrested. Ferner was charged with criminal trespass and with weapons possession (a Swiss Army pocketknife).

In 2006 he published "Inside the Red Zone: A Veteran For Peace Reports from Iraq," recounting his trips to Iraq, just prior to the U.S. invasion and a year later.

Ferner ran for Toledo mayor in the special election held November 3, 2015 to fill the last two years of D. Michael Collins' term after Collins died in office.

== Works ==
- Mike Ferner (2006). Inside the Red Zone: A Veteran for Peace Reports from Iraq. foreword by Cindy Sheehan. New York: Praeger. ISBN 0-275-99243-8.
- Mike Ferner (2003). War and Peace and Democracy: Four Essays That Ask Why Again?. Law & Democracy Program on Corporations.
