= Toledo Fire & Rescue Department =

Operational area
- Country: United States
- State: Ohio
- City: Toledo
- Address: 545 North Huron Street
- Coordinates: 41.65625300°N 83.53383060°W

Agency overview
- Established: November 27, 1837
- Annual calls: 55,733 (2012)
- Employees: Over 500 (2015)
- Annual budget: $76,723,408 (2022)
- Staffing: Career
- Fire chief: Allison Armstrong
- EMS level: Basic Life Support (BLS) & Advanced Life Support (ALS)
- IAFF: 92
- Motto: "Making A Difference Every Day"

Facilities and equipment
- Battalions: 3 Battalions
- Stations: 18
- Engines: 18
- Trucks: 5 (3 Tower Ladder Trucks and 2 Regular Aerial Ladder Trucks) Only 3 staffed daily
- Squads: 2
- Ambulances: 6 - Advanced Life Support (ALS) Units; 9 - Basic Life Support (BLS) Units
- HAZMAT: 1
- USAR: 2
- Fireboats: 1
- Rescue boats: 2

Website
- www.toledofirerescue.com
- IAFF website

The City of Toledo Department of Fire & Rescue Operations, or simply Toledo Fire & Rescue Department provides fire protection and emergency medical services for Toledo, Ohio. The department was established on November 27, 1837.

== Stations and apparatus ==
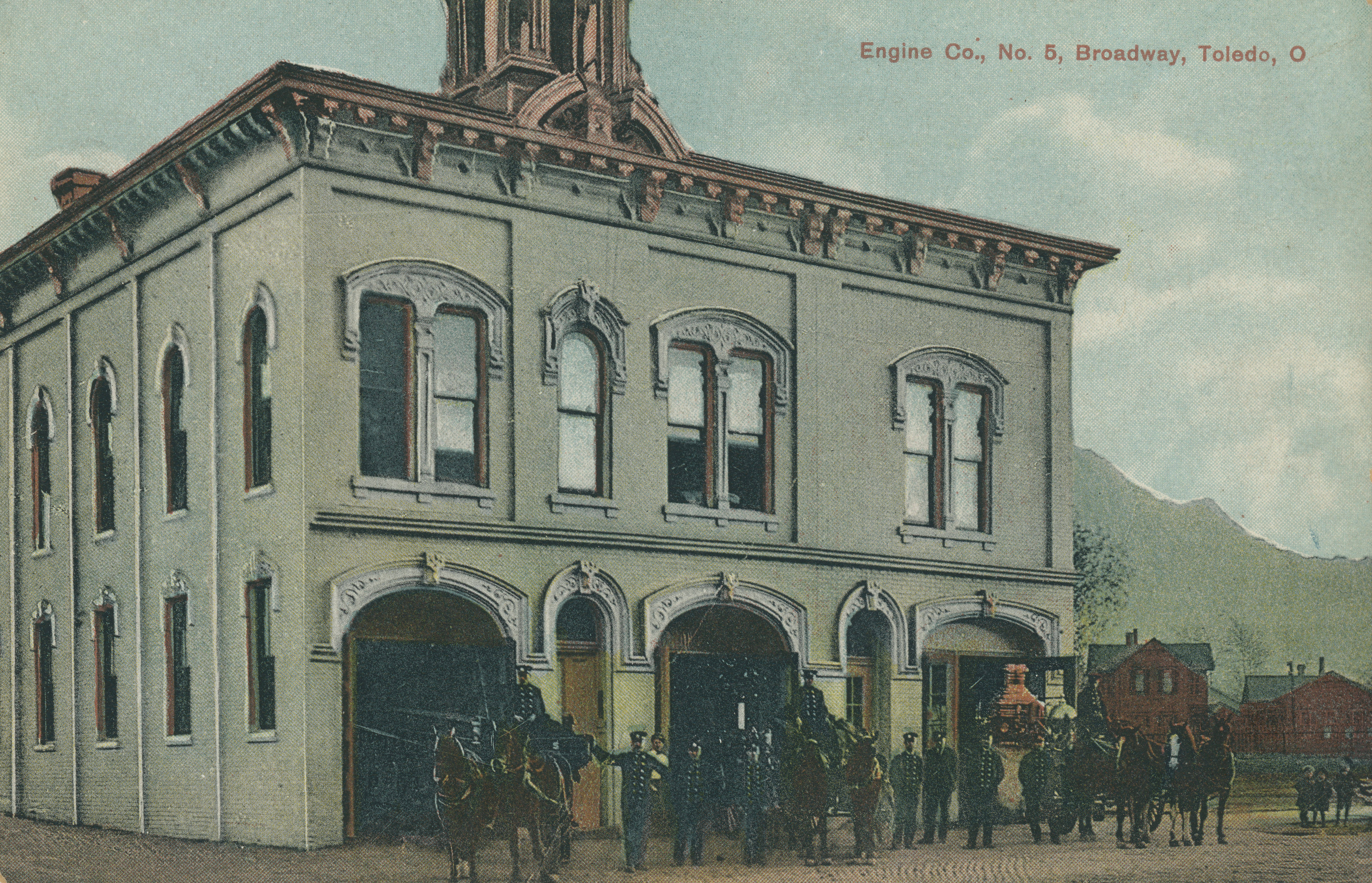
Engine Company Number Five, 601 Broadway Street, Toledo, Ohio. In use between 1873 and 1968.

As of March 2019, the complete list of stations and apparatus, broken down by battalion, is listed below.

- Toledo Fire & Rescue paramedics staff 5 full-time Lucas County Life Squads and Life Squad 11, which is in-service from 7 a.m. to 10 p.m. daily. At 10 p.m., Medic 3 (BLS) goes in-service until 7 a.m.
- Truck 6 and Truck 25 are "ghost trucks," put into service when staffing allows or the number of available trucks in the city necessitate.

Fire Station Number	Neighborhood	Engine Company	Tower Ladder Company or Truck Company	Rescue Squad Company	Basic Life Support Medic Unit	Lucas County Life Squad Unit*	Special Unit	Chief Unit	Battalion
1	Headquarters								
3	North End	Engine 3			Medic 3	Life Squad 11			1
4	Scott Park	Engine 4	Truck 4		Medic 4	Life Squad 7		Battalion Chief 2	2
5	Downtown	Engine 5	Truck 5			Life Squad 1	Water Rescue Unit (WRU & Zodiak)		1
6	East Side	Engine 6	Truck 6**	Rescue 6		Life Squad 2	USAR1, Decon Shower Trailer, Stakebed Truck	Battalion Chief 1	1
7	Old West End	Engine 7		Rescue 7			HazMat 7		1
9	Old South End	Engine 9					Safety (Unit 134)		1
11	Eastgate	Engine 11			Medic 11				2
12	North River	Engine 12					Air 3		3
13	Birmingham	Engine 13			Medic 13		MARINE 3		1
14	Reynolds Corners	Engine 14					C-VAC		2
16	Onyx	Engine 16				Life Squad 4			2
17	Auburn	Engine 17	Truck 17						3
18	North Towne	Engine 18			Medic 18	Life Squad 3	USAR2, Confined Space 18	Battalion Chief 3	3
19	Polish Village	Engine 19			Medic 19				3
21	Beverly	Engine 21			Medic 21				2
23	Trilby	Engine 23			Medic 23				3
24	Point Place	Engine 24					Jon Boat		3
25	Old Orchard	Engine 25			Medic 25	Life Squad 5	Decon 25		3
