= Michael Bell (mayor) =

American mayor

Michael P. Bell
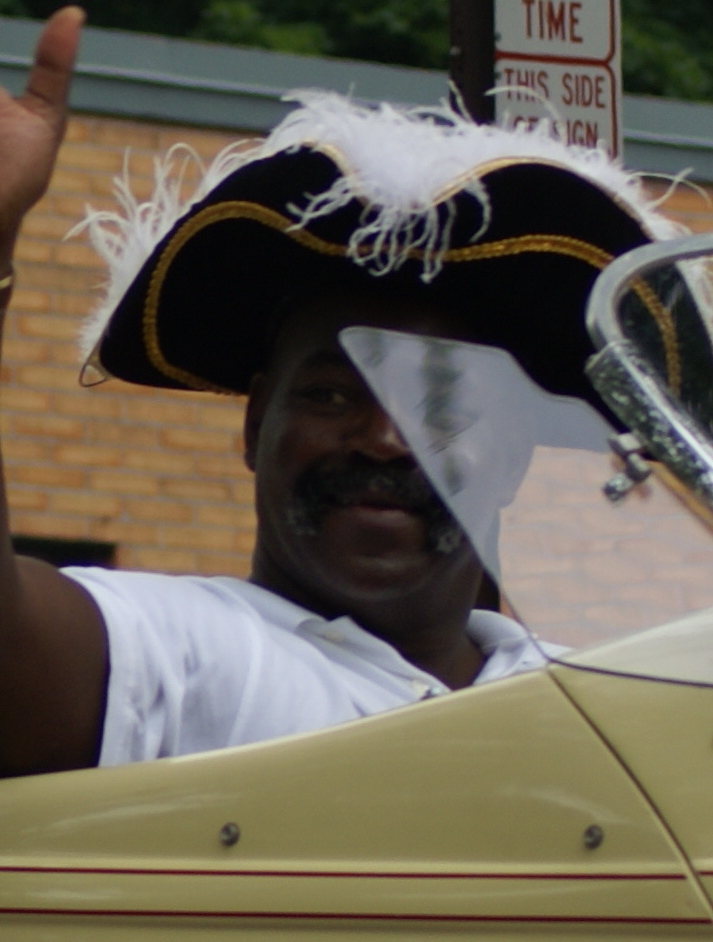

61st Mayor of Toledo, Ohio
- In office January 4, 2010 – January 4, 2014
- Preceded by: Carleton "Carty" S. Finkbeiner
- Succeeded by: D. Michael Collins

Personal details
- Born: 1955 (age 70–71)
- Party: Independent
- Education: University of Toledo

Michael P. Bell (born 1955) is a former Mayor of Toledo, Ohio who took office on January 4, 2010, and served until January 4, 2014. Bell previously served as Toledo Fire Chief and State Fire Marshal.

== Early career ==
His career in Public Service began in 1980 when he joined the Toledo Department of Fire and Rescue as a firefighter and later became a certified paramedic/EMT. In 1990, he was appointed as Chief of the Toledo Fire and Rescue Department, the first African American as well as the youngest person ever to lead the department. He remained in that position for over 16 years. Under his leadership the TFD earned the prestigious honor of Accreditation by the Commission on Fire Accreditation, a certification held by only the most elite fire departments. He is a member of the International Fire Chief's Association and received the President's Award for his efforts for diversification.

== State Fire Marshal ==
In 2007, he was appointed as State Fire Marshal by Ohio Governor Ted Strickland. In that position he implemented the "Everyone Goes Home" program, stressing firefighter safety. That program earned the Seal of Excellence Award from the Firefighter Life Safety Initiatives Program.

== Mayor of Toledo ==
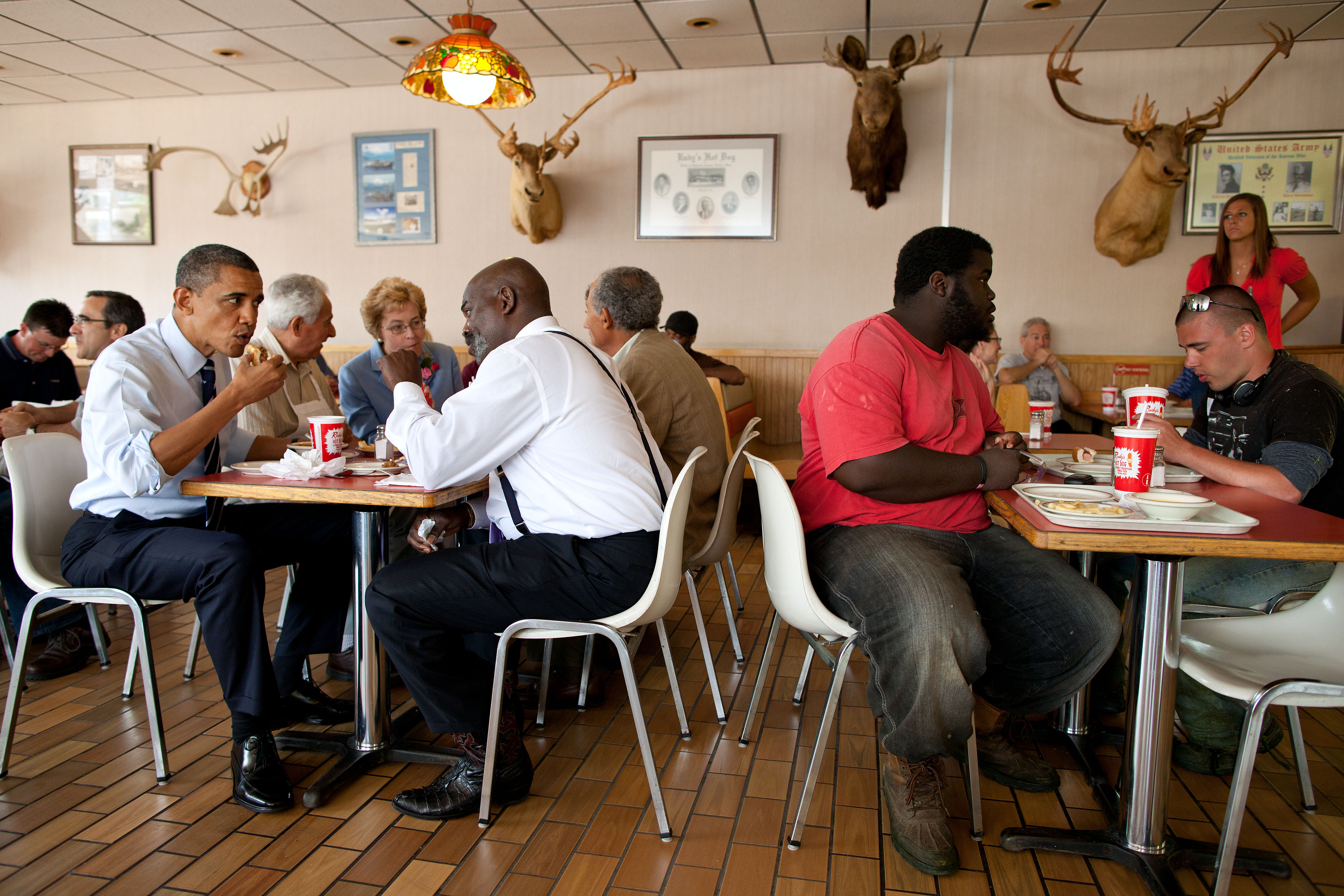
Michael Bell dining with President Barack Obama at Rudy's Hot Dog in 2011.

In 2009, Bell ran as an independent in Toledo's mayoral election. He ran against attorney Keith Wilkowski, a Democrat. Bell defeated Wilkowski on the November 3 election by a margin of only 2% and was sworn in on January 4, 2010. He was the second African-American mayor in the city's history.

In 2013, Bell again ran for mayor, however, his opponent, Councilman D. Michael Collins, won the mayor's race by a margin of 56.5% to 43.5%.

The unofficial vote was 28,002 for Mr. Collins and 21,535 for Mr. Bell. Turnout was 25.4 percent of registered voters in the city.

Bell officially ended his term as Mayor of Toledo on January 4, 2014.

Political offices
Preceded by Carty Finkbeiner	Mayor of Toledo; 2010–2014	Succeeded by D. Michael Collins
