= Carty Finkbeiner =

American Democratic politician served as mayor of Toledo, Ohio

Carleton S. Finkbeiner
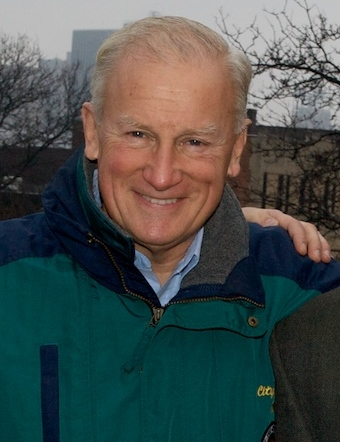
- Finkbeiner in 2006

58th and 60th Mayor of Toledo
- In office January 1, 1994 – 2002
- Preceded by: John McHugh
- Succeeded by: Jack Ford
- In office January 3, 2006 – January 4, 2010
- Preceded by: Jack Ford
- Succeeded by: Michael P. Bell

Personal details
- Born: May 30, 1939 (age 87) Toledo, Ohio, U.S.
- Party: Democratic
- Other political affiliations: Republican (formerly)
- Spouse: Amy Finkbeiner
- Education: Denison University

Carleton "Carty" S. Finkbeiner (born May 30, 1939) is an American Democratic politician and former mayor of Toledo, Ohio.

In all, Finkbeiner has run for Toledo mayor seven times, spanning a period of 40 years. He was elected to four-year terms in 1993, 1997, and 2005; he lost in 1981 (to Douglas DeGood), 1987 (to Donna Owens), 2015 (to Paula Hicks-Hudson), and 2021 (to Wade Kapszukiewicz).

First elected in 1993, he took office on January 1, 1994. In 1997, he defeated challenger Nick Wichowski to win a second term. Term limits prevented him from running a third consecutive time. He was succeeded by former mayor Jack Ford in 2002. Following his first administration, Finkbeiner served on the Toledo-Lucas County Port Authority board. He joined the ABC affiliate in Toledo and hosted Carty & Company, a Sunday morning public affairs show. He also contributed a weekly editorial segment, It's Just Not Right! Finkbeiner left WTVG in May 2005.

On June 30, 2005, Finkbeiner announced that he would seek a third term as mayor. He won the Toledo mayoral primary, winning roughly 37% of the vote in comparison to 29% earned by incumbent Ford. On November 8, 2005, Finkbeiner was re-elected mayor. Finkbeiner was sworn in for his third term as mayor in a private ceremony on January 3, 2006. Carty announced that his third run as mayor would be his final one and he would not seek re-election. According to city finance records verified by the Toledo Blade, Finkbeiner left the city with a 48 million dollar deficit which was inherited by Ohio Fire Marshall Michael P. Bell, an Independent, who succeeded Carty Finkbeiner in 2010.

Finkbeiner resides with his wife, Amy Finkbeiner, in South Toledo. He has three children: Ryan, Jenny, and Katie, and five grandchildren.

Finkbeiner announced plans to run for a fourth term as mayor of Toledo on August 29, 2015. The 2015 election, to fill the remainder of Michael Collins' mayoral term, was won by Paula Hicks-Hudson.

In July 2021, Finkbeiner filed a petition to run again for mayor of Toledo, challenging incumbent Wade Kapszukiewicz. Kapszukiewicz overwhelmingly won a second term by defeating Finkbeiner and winning by a record margin in Toledo history with 68.9 percent of the vote.

== Early life ==
Finkbeiner was born in 1939 and raised in Toledo. His father was an engineer who specialized in building municipal water and sewage systems; he was a one-time president of the Ohio Society of Professional Engineers.

Finkbeiner graduated from Maumee Valley Country Day School, where he was an all-state high school quarterback. He attended Trinity College in Connecticut, where he lettered in football, baseball, and basketball until a head injury ended his athletic career; he transferred to Denison University in Granville, Ohio and received a bachelor's degree in 1962. After graduation, he returned to Toledo to teach and coach football at Maumee Valley. In 1963, he was hired as an assistant football coach at the University of Toledo, where he also taught physical education classes.

Over the next decade, he held a variety of jobs, including as an insurance salesman, encyclopedia salesman, social worker, census taker, and TV sportscaster. Between 1967 and 1969, he was associate director of the Toledo Office of Economic Opportunity, administering War on Poverty programs. In the early 1970s, he worked for Youth For Understanding, an international student exchange program.

== 1970s: Campaigns for Congress as a Republican ==
In 1974, Finkbeiner ran for the U.S. House of Representatives as a moderate Republican, facing a 22-year incumbent Democrat, Rep. Lud Ashley. Despite the terrible political environment for Republicans amid the Watergate scandal, he outperformed expectations, winning 47% of the vote. He ran against Ashley again in 1976, but the incumbent hit back by criticizing Finkbeiner's unsteady work history and won by 10 percentage points.

Finkbeiner had, in effect, been running for the seat since 1968, when — while debating whether to enter the Virginia Theological Seminary — he decided to seek the office. He was then a registered Democrat. But thinking he couldn't beat the powerful Ashley in a Democratic primary, he switched parties to the Republicans. Ohio state law at the time prevented a candidate from running as a Republican until five years after his last vote in a Democratic primary, meaning his run couldn't begin until 1973.

== 1980s: Campaigns as a Republican, independent, and Democrat ==
He was elected to Toledo City Council in 1979 as a Republican, and in 1981 he challenged incumbent Democratic mayor Douglas DeGood. DeGood prevailed narrowly, beating Finkbeiner by a margin of 50.2% to 49.8%, despite outspending him 3–1. Finkbeiner was elected again to city council in 1983 and 1985, both times as an independent, though he then rejoined the Democratic Party.

In 1987, he challenged two-term Republican mayor Donna Owens as a Democrat. In the September nonpartisan primary, Finkbeiner topped Owens decisively, winning 62.7% of votes versus Owens (36.8%) and two minor candidates. But those results merely meant Finkbeiner and Owens would meet again in the November general election.

The campaign between Finkbeiner and Owens was negative and personal, drawing national attention. Owens mocked Finkbeiner's "goofy ideas" and accused him of being $3,000 behind on child support payments, a charge he denied; Finkbeiner accused Owens of being in the pocket of big downtown development interests at the expense of Toledo's neighborhoods. Finkbeiner's skimpy employment record was again an issue, with Owens noting his tax returns reported his only income the previous year had been his $7,800 in city council salary. The Associated Press reported that the two "seem to have a genuine dislike for each other"; his old foe Lud Ashley fronted a group named Democrats for Donna. In the general election, Owens beat Finkbeiner, 52% to 48%. Finkbeiner declined to congratulate her, calling her campaign "an affront to the citizens of the community."

Now without his meager city council salary, Finkbeiner took a job with a suburban Toledo furniture store. Among other things, he began "appearing in television commercials discussing a number of public issues as well as promoting the store." He also helped found and became executive administrator of an anti-drug group named Crackdown Inc.

Finkbeiner announced another run for mayor against Owens in 1989, but he later withdrew after the Lucas County Democratic Party endorsed John McHugh. McHugh easily defeated Owens that year, while voters returned Finkbeiner to city council, where his fellow council members elected him vice mayor.

Finkbeiner's eight runs for office since 1974 had made him perhaps the best-known politician in the city and a center of controversy. As an Associated Press headline put it: "Carty Finkbeiner: Toledoans either love or hate him":

Finkbeiner's approach to issues has made him a popular, but misunderstood, politician. Residents love him or hate him; there's no middle ground. He has alienated local power brokers, saying corporate leaders "sit at the exclusive Toledo Club drinking martinis, talking about workers who make too much money while they make plans to move their factories out of the city." Finkbeiner has been called an urban populist — a title he wears like a badge of honor — for his fight to get the city to spend more money in neighborhoods rather than on downtown riverfront projects. He has been called a political opportunist, who switches parties and issues when expedient.

== 1990s: First two terms as mayor ==
With McHugh running for a second term, Finkbeiner ran for council again in 1991, winning easily. He worked on issues that could increase his popularity among more conservative voters, proposing a citywide curfew for teenagers and sponsoring a "Buy American" bill for city purchases. Council rejected the curfew, but Finkbeiner and future mayor Jack Ford led a signature drive to put the issue before voters, who approved it.

In 1992, Finkbeiner and a group of other city leaders proposed a switch from a city manager form of government to a strong-mayor system. Previously, much of the role of Toledo's mayor was ceremonial, with little more power than other city council members and administrative authority invested in the city manager. Finkbeiner also proposed switching from at-large city council seats to a mix of at-large and neighborhood districts, which appealed to civil rights groups.

Toledo voters had rejected strong-mayor proposals six times in the previous 55 years, most recently in 1988, when sitting mayor Owens opposed it. But this time, voters approved the change, setting up the 1993 election to pick the city's first "strong mayor" in decades.

The candidates in 1993 included three members of Toledo city council: Finkbeiner, Democrat Peter Silverman, and independent Mike Ferner. Also running were Republican Paula Pennypacker, a former radio talk show host who had lost to McHugh in 1991, and Bill Boyle, a former Lucas County Democratic Party chairman. In the non-partisan primary, Finkbeiner came out on top with 27%, followed by Ferner with 23%, Boyle with 19%, Silverman with 16%, and Pennypacker with 10%.

Ferner, Finkbeiner's opponent in the general election, had made his name on the political left, working as an anti-war activist, union organizer, environmentalist, and proponent of a municipal power company to replace unpopular utility Toledo Edison, whose electric rates were among the nation's highest. As in 1987, the campaign took on a nasty tone. Finkbeiner allies attacked Ferner for being an agnostic and over his (honorable) discharge from the Navy in 1973 as a conscientious objector. A Ferner supporter said he had fired Finkbeiner from his brief stint running Crackdown Inc. in 1990 for "incompetence." Ferner criticized Finkbeiner as an opportunist and flip-flopper on policy; Finkbeiner accused Ferner of "socialist tendencies" and an "anti-business, soft-on-crime attitude."

A poll two weeks before the election showed Ferner with a 17-point lead. But Finkbeiner's late attacks gave him a boost, and unofficial returns on election night gave Finkbeiner a 702-vote lead, out of more than 92,000 votes cast. A recount later reduced that total to 672 votes.

== Controversy ==
Several controversies have occurred during Finkbeiner's involvement in public office:

- In November 1994, Mayor Carty Finkbeiner suggested at a staff meeting that a way to resolve complaints about airport noise would be to move deaf people into the neighborhood.
- Toledo restaurateur John Skiadas filed a lawsuit alleging that Finkbeiner physically and verbally assaulted him at the Erie Street Market in 2000. The lawsuit was dismissed by Lucas County Common Pleas Judge Charles Wittenberg in 2004.
- In March, 1999, Finkbeiner called for a boycott of Little Caesar's Pizza because of the franchise owners’ involvement in a proposed Rossford sports arena. Some Little Caesar's stores renamed their Crazy Bread "Carty Bread".
- In 1997, the Finkbeiner Administration negotiated to convert the Beacon Place Apartments, an apartment complex in the Warren-Sherman neighborhood near downtown Toledo, into condominiums. Despite assurances from Finkbeiner's housing commissioner, James Thurston, that the city would not be held financially responsible for the project, the project collapsed because the Finkbeiner Administration failed to clear the sale of the properties with the federal government, which had financed the apartments. Toledo taxpayers lost $230,000 and could have paid more than $2.3 million. Thurston and Edwin Bergsmark (CEO of Cavista Corporation, the owner of the Beacon Place Apartments) were both convicted in this scandal.
- He plagiarized a single line in his KICK-OFF speech in 1998.
- In early 2006, political adversaries scoffed over the mayor spending $9,996 of city money to complete the installation of shower facilities in his city government building office. The project was considered "controversial" in part because the shower quote was originally $10,006, six dollars over a threshold that requires approval from City Council. The contractor was able to shave $10 from the project, thus avoiding a Council vote on the proposal.
- In May 2006, he called Toledo's African American Fire Chief Michael Bell "King Kong" at a staff meeting. Finkbeiner later clarified his remarks as relating to the Chief's physical stature, and Chief Bell has acknowledged in public that he took no offense to the remarks.
- In June 2006, Jack Smith resigned from his brief tenure as Chief of Police after what he described as a near-physical confrontation with the mayor after they exchanged words.
- In February 2008, Finkbeiner refused to let a company of 200 Marine Corps Reservists engage in urban patrol exercises on the streets of downtown as well as inside the mostly vacant Madison Building, 607 Madison Ave. Toledo police knew about the event three days in advance, but it wasn't until the Marines arrived that "the mayor asked them to leave because they frighten people", said Brian Schwartz, the mayor's spokesman. Finkbeiner defended his decision to cancel the exercise, but in an e-mail to Marine Corps officials, he expressed support for the Marines and the military and invited the Marine unit to return to Toledo for training, but not downtown. In reaction to the uproar, Finkbeiner has offered conflicting explanations for his denial. During a radio interview on The Frank Beckmann Show on WJR-760 AM in Detroit on Tuesday, Feb. 12th, Finkbeiner used profanity to describe the situation he caused as a "fucking ruckus".
- In summer 2008, Finkbeiner spent nearly $80,000 of taxpayer money (without City Council approval) to renovate Bay 4 the Erie Street Market into a concert venue. According to the City Charter, the mayor may spend up to $10,000 without City Council approval. Finkbeiner broke the nearly $80,000 into 13 separate contracts under $10,000 to circumvent council's approval. Moreover, Finkbeiner tapped a local concert promoter, Rob Croak, to schedule events at the Erie Street Market. Croak was convicted on one count of forgery and has been arrested for but not convicted of underage alcohol sales, according to court records. The forgery conviction stems from a 2001 accusation that Croak falsified records to obtain a liquor permit. Also, Croak owes thousands of dollars in back state and federal taxes.
- In 2009, Take Back Toledo (a group of Toledo area businessmen whose goal is to foster a pro-business, pro-jobs and pro-economic development climate in Northwestern Ohio) led a campaign to recall Finkbeiner from office. On April 15, the Lucas County Board of Elections validated 20,400 signature, enough to recall Finkbeiner. On April 20, Clerk of Council Jerry Dendinger hand-delivered a recall notice to Finkbeiner. According to the City Charter, Finkbeiner had five days to resign or face a recall vote on the November election. Finkbeiner refused to resign and hired a law firm to contest the validity of the recall petition signatures. The Supreme Court of Ohio ultimately ruled that due to missing language in the recall petition, that it was invalid.
- In June 2009, Finkbeiner supported the $25 parking tickets issued by the Division of Streets, Bridges, and Harbor to residents for parking in their own driveways. He claimed the tickets were given due to a city law that prohibits parking on unpaved surfaces, which includes gravel driveways. Two major problems with the tickets were that the city law that had not been enforced for about 50 years was now suddenly being enforced without warning and that according to the Toledo City Charter only the Toledo Police Dept can issue tickets for parking, traffic, etc. and not representatives of other city agencies. Despite criticism, Finkbeiner ignored a press question asking if the fines were related to the city's financial woes.
- In June 2009, a video surfaced showing Finkbeiner breaking up a fight in Highland Park, calling one boy "fatso", "tubby", and "fat ass".
