= D. Michael Collins =

Ohio politician

Dennis Michael Collins

62nd Mayor of Toledo
- In office January 2, 2014 – February 6, 2015
- Preceded by: Michael P. Bell
- Succeeded by: Paula Hicks-Hudson (acting)

Member of the Toledo City Council from 2nd district
- In office 2008–2014

Personal details
- Born: June 30, 1944 Toledo, Ohio, U.S.
- Died: February 6, 2015 (aged 70) Toledo, Ohio, U.S.
- Party: Independent
- Spouse: Sandy Drabik
- Children: 3 daughters 1 son
- Education: St. James Grade School; Libbey High School (1962)
- Alma mater: The University of Toledo (B.S., 1975; M.B.A., 1998)

Dennis Michael Collins (June 30, 1944 – February 6, 2015) was an American politician who served as the mayor of Toledo, Ohio, from 2014 until his death in 2015. An Independent, he was a member of the Toledo City Council from District 2 (2008-2014). In the 2013 mayoral election, Collins defeated incumbent Independent mayor Michael P. Bell, winning 55.37% of the total vote.

== Education and personal life ==
A graduate of Libbey High School (1962), he held a Bachelor of Science degree in Human Resources Management and Natural Sciences (1975) and a Masters of Business Administration degree (1998) from the University of Toledo.

He was married to Sandy Drabik and had three daughters and a son (who died in 2000).

== Coronary episode and death ==
On the afternoon of February 1, 2015, television news bulletins reported that Collins had been hospitalized with what was described as a "coronary episode". That night the mayor's spokesman announced that Collins was in critical condition after suffering a coronary arrest before being resuscitated. Because he was unable to perform his mayoral duties, Toledo City Council president Paula Hicks-Hudson was sworn in on February 1, 2015, as acting mayor. She is Toledo's first African American woman to lead the city. Collins died on February 6, 2015, at the age of 70.

Political offices
Preceded by Michael P. Bell	Mayor of Toledo; 2014–2015	Succeeded by Paula Hicks-Hudson
