= Toledo City Council =

City council; lawmaking body of the city of Toledo, Ohio

Type
- Type: Unicameral

Leadership
- President: Vanice S. Williams
- Seats: 12 officially non-partisan

Elections
- Last election: November 7, 2023
- Next election: November 4, 2025

Meeting place
- One Government Center; 640 Jackson St, Toledo, OH 43604

Website
- toledo.oh.gov/city-council

Toledo City Council is the governing body of the city of Toledo, Ohio since 1914.

Council meets bi-weekly at One Government Center in downtown Toledo.

The Council consists of 12 members, 6 by district and 6 at large.

The Council President is the presiding officer and is selected amongst the council members.

The Districts are geographic and boundaries were shifted in 2011 due to population changes.

The Mayor of Toledo is not a member of the council, but does have a vote on legislation where a council vote results in a tie.

== Toledo Municipal Code ==
The powers of the members are governed by the Toledo Municipal Code.

== Current Council Members ==
As of October 2026 The current composition of district council is:

- District 1: John Hobbs III
- District 2: Adam Martinez
- District 3: Theresa Gadus
- District 4: Vanice S. Williams
- District 5: Sam Melden
- District 6: Theresa Morris

The At-Large Councilmen are:

- Mac Driscoll
- Dr. Brittany Jones
- Nick Komives
- Cerssandra McPherson
- George Sarantou
- Erin Kramer

== Standing Committees (Chair/Vice Chair) ==
(As of March 2023)

- Education, Recreation, & Employment Committee (Williams/McPherson)
- Finance, Debt, & Budget Oversight Committee (Sarantou/Moline)
- Health Promotion & Access Committee (Gadus/McPherson)
- Neighborhoods & Community Development Committee (Whitman/Gadus)
- Public Safety & Criminal Justice Reform Committee (Cherry/Hobbs III)
- Regional Growth, Development, & Small Business Enterprise Committee (Morris/Hobbs III)
- Streets, Public Services, & Utilities (Melden/Cherry)
- Water Quality & Sustainability Committee (Komives/Hobbs III)
- Zoning & Planning Committee (Cherry/Morris)

== Council Chambers ==
Councilmen and other civic officials (City clerk and Assistant Clerk) are seated with a desk in front for guests. A glass wall separates the council from seating for visitors.
