= Caleb F. Abbott =

American politician

- Born: September 8, 1811; Chelmsford, Massachusetts, U.S.
- Died: April 24, 1855 (aged 43)
- Occupation: Lawyer
- Notable work: He was the mayor of Toledo, Ohio in 1850

Caleb F. Abbott (September 8, 1811 – April 24, 1855) was the mayor of Toledo, Ohio in 1850.

== Life ==
Abbott was born in Chelmsford, MA, he got a good education and became one of the well-learned residents of northwestern Ohio after finishing at Harvard College. Following in Henry Clay's footsteps, he became an important figure in the Whig party.

Through his university degree, he became a leading lawyer in the town of Toledo, in 1835-1836. His lawyer career brought him to become part of the first debating club in the Lucas County prosecutor's office, then administered by Emery D. Potter. In 1838, he was co-founder of the first Public Library in Toledo. The same year he was elected, for the following four years, as the Lucas County Prosecutor.

His prominent role in Toledo had him become the Toledo mayor in 1850, replacing Daniel O. Morton in office. Abbott died in 1855 in this town and was buried at Forest Cemetery.

Political offices
Preceded by Daniel O. Morton	Mayor of Toledo; 1850–1851	Succeeded by Charles M. Dorr
