= Alfred Peck Edgerton =

American politician

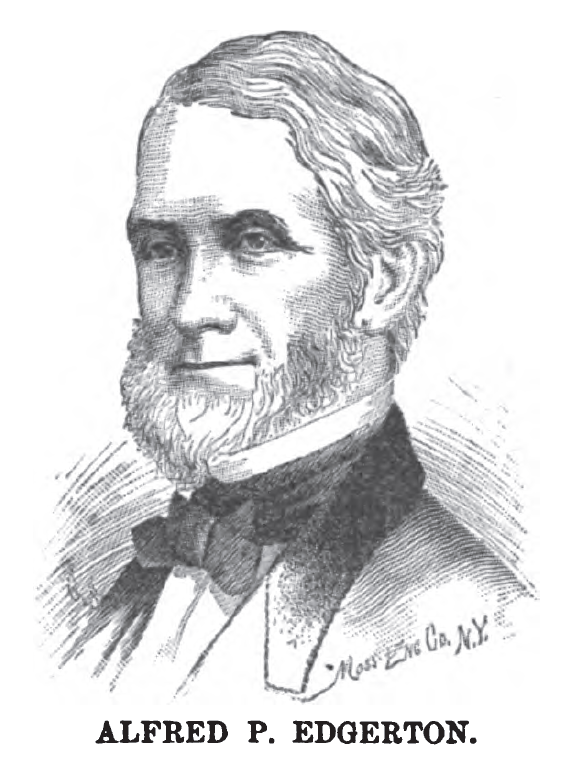

Member of the U.S. House of Representatives from Ohio's 5th district
- In office March 4, 1851 – March 3, 1855
- Preceded by: Emery D. Potter
- Succeeded by: Richard Mott

Member of the Ohio Senate from the Defiance and 7 other counties district
- In office December 1, 1845 – December 6, 1847
- Preceded by: new district
- Succeeded by: Sabrit Scott

Personal details
- Born: January 11, 1813 Plattsburgh, New York
- Died: May 14, 1897 (aged 84) Hicksville, Ohio
- Party: Democratic

Alfred Peck Edgerton (January 11, 1813 – May 14, 1897) was an American businessman. He served as a member of the United States House of Representatives from Ohio for two terms, from 1851 to 1855.

== Early life and career ==
Edgerton was born in Plattsburgh, New York, on January 11, 1813. He graduated from Plattsburgh Academy and worked briefly for a newspaper.

He moved to New York City to work in advertising and other business pursuits. Within a few years, in 1837, Edgerton moved to Hicksville, Ohio, an area of development. He became manager of the American Land Company, engaging in surveying and selling land for settlement and development in northern Ohio. He was the founder of Edgerton, Ohio.

== Congress ==
A Democrat, Edgerton served in the Ohio State Senate from 1845 and 1846. He was elected to the United States House of Representatives in 1850 and served two terms as a member of the Thirty-second and Thirty-third Congresses, March 4, 1851, to March 3, 1855.

== Later career ==
After leaving Congress, Edgerton resided in New York City. He worked as the financial agent of Ohio's Board of Fund Commissioners, the agency responsible for issuing, paying interest on, redeeming and canceling the state's general obligation bonds. In 1857, he moved to Fort Wayne, Indiana, as general manager of the Wabash and Erie Canal.

Edgerton returned to Ohio in 1868, and that year was an unsuccessful candidate for lieutenant governor.

In 1873, he built St. Paul's Episcopal Church (Hicksville, Ohio). The church was consecrated on Oct 1, 1875, and on the same day his grandson Robert Swartwout was the first child baptized.

In 1885, Edgerton was appointed Chairman of the United States Civil Service Commission, and he served until 1889.

== Death and family legacy ==
Edgerton died in Hicksville, Ohio, on May 14, 1897. His body was transported to Fort Wayne, Indiana, where he was buried in Lindenwood Cemetery.

He was the brother of Joseph Ketchum Edgerton, an attorney and businessman who served in Congress from Indiana. His parents were Bela Edgerton and Phebe Ketchum. On February 9, 1841, he married Charlotte Elizabeth Dixon. They had eight children. He was the grandfather of architect Egerton Swartwout.

== Links ==
- Alfred Peck Edgerton at Find a Grave

U.S. House of Representatives
Preceded by Emery D. Potter	Member of the U.S. House of Representatives from Ohio's 5th congressional district 1851–1855	Succeeded by Richard Mott
