= Don Batchelor =

American football player (1895–1970)

Profile
- Position: Tackle

Personal information
- Born: June 15, 1895; Hicksville, Ohio, U.S.
- Died: September 25, 1970 (aged 75); Grand Blanc, Michigan, U.S.
- Listed height: 6 ft 3 in (1.91 m)
- Listed weight: 225 lb (102 kg)

Career information
- College: Grove City College, Ohio Northern University

Career history
- Canton Bulldogs (1922); Toledo Maroons (1923)

Awards and highlights
- Won 1922 NFL Championship
- Stats at Pro Football Reference

Donald G. Batchelor (June 15, 1895 – September 25, 1970) was a professional football player who spent two years of the National Football League with the Canton Bulldogs and the Toledo Maroons. Batchelor won an NFL championship with the Bulldogs in 1922. In 1923, he played for the Maroons.

After his professional football career, Don settled in Grand Blanc, Michigan. He later worked as a school teacher, a coach, and was a Republican representative to the Michigan state constitutional convention for Genesee County (2nd District) in 1961. The convention convened in Lansing on October 3, 1961, and adjourned on August 1, 1962. He was also a member of the Disciples of Christ and the Freemasons.

== Family ==
Don was the son of George Batchelor and Cora (Babb) Batchelor. He was married to Grace F. Dibble.
