= Portia Willis =

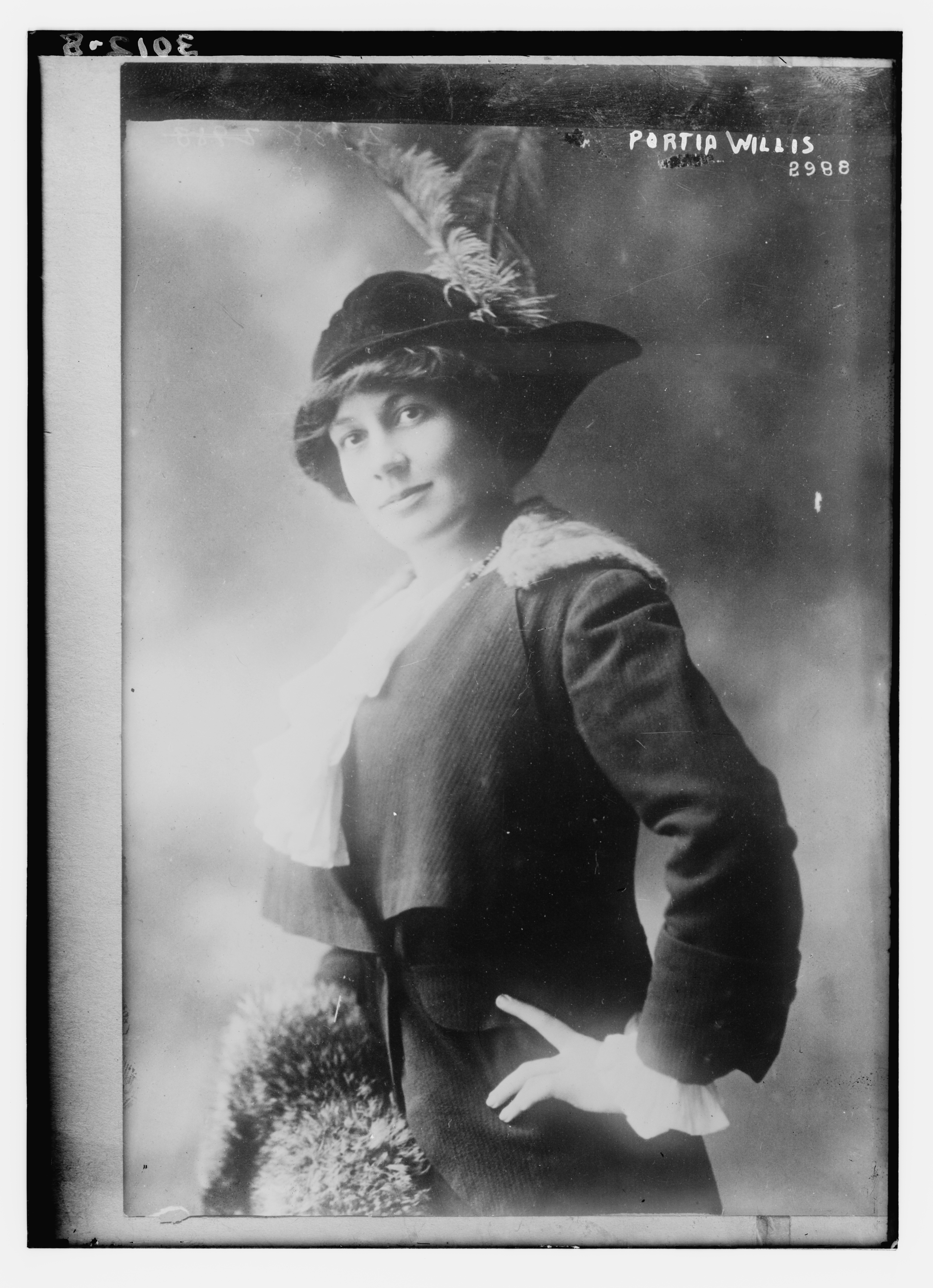
Portia Willis in 1910

Portia H. Willis (c. 1887 – July 7, 1970) was an American suffragist, pacifist, lecturer, activist and organiser of the early 20th-century.

== Biography ==
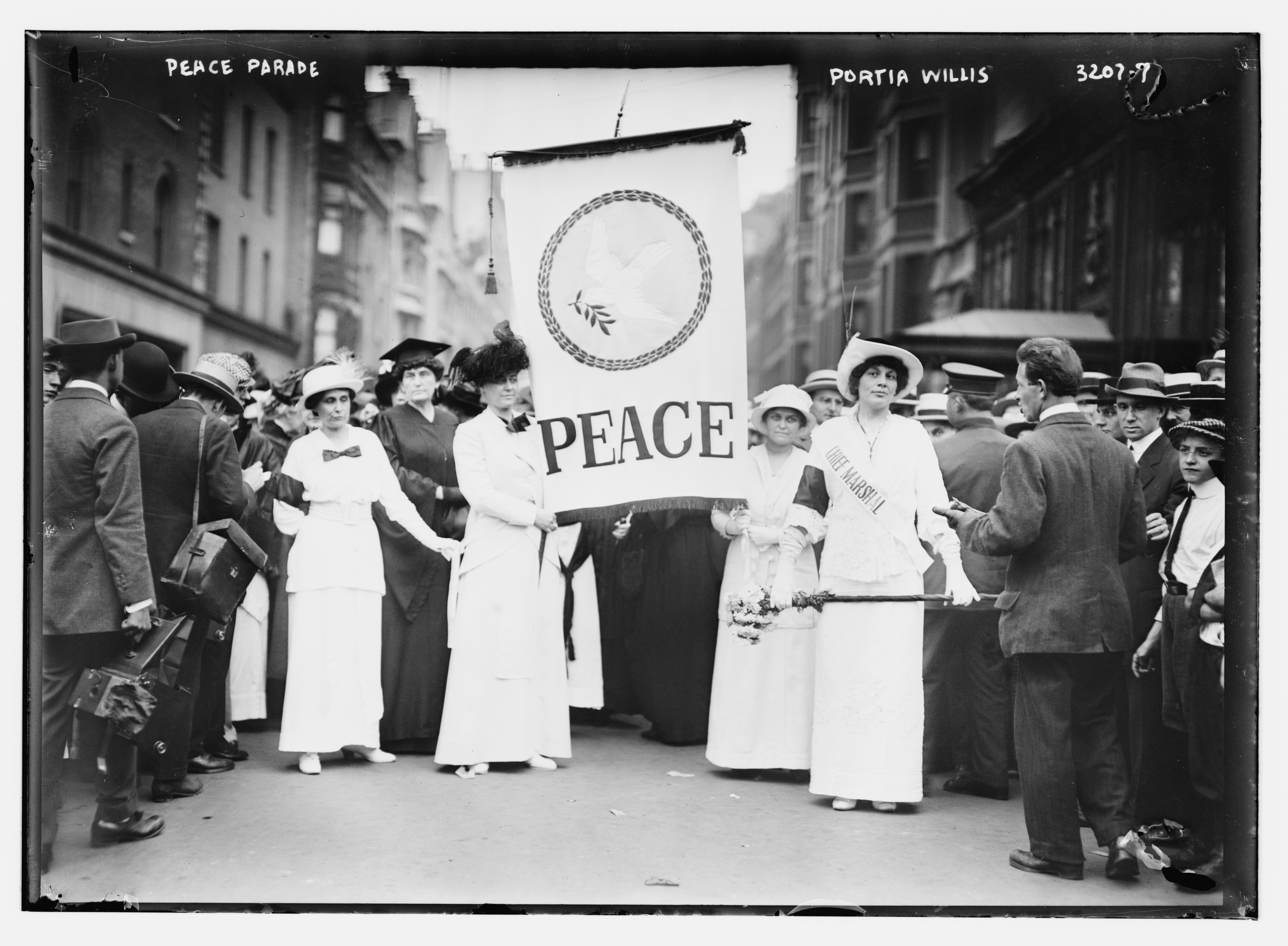
Portia Willis (right), serving as Grand Marshall of the New York Women's Peace Parade in 1914

Portia Willis, born around 1887, was the second daughter of lawyer, real-estate businessman and Democrat former congressman Benjamin A. Willis and Lillie Evelyn Macauley. She was educated at the Anne Brown School and attended, though did not graduate from, Columbia University and Harvard College.

Willis involved herself in the New York state suffrage movement from about 1910 through to its successful conclusion in 1917, including organising and giving lecture tours throughout the state, dropping leaflets from aeroplanes, and speaking in other states including Massachusetts in 1914, and New Jersey and Washington, D.C., in 1915. Her relatively high profile, the circumstances of her birth into a well known political family, and the nature of newspaper reporting of the day gave rise to frequent press coverage earning her the soubriquet of "The Prettiest Suffragette in New York State". Her name was entered into New York State's suffrage honor roll in 1931.

Her pacifism activities lasted throughout her life as she organised and involved herself in a string of organisations dedicated to world peace. She served as the Grand Marshal for the Women's Peace Parade in 1914. She was a member of the Women's Pro-League Council, which organised in support of the League of Nations. After the 1920 inception of the League, she helped to found and manage the Greater New York branch of the League of Nations Association. Other of her memberships include the New York Board of the Women's International League for Peace and Freedom, and the Round Table on the United Nations, which she chaired from 1950 to 1953.

Despite her pacifism, she was an active supporter of airmen in World War I and a member of the Red Cross; after the war she was given honorary membership of the Aerial League of America for her services.

Besides these activities, she was also one of the founders, in 1919, of the Women's Roosevelt Memorial Association; an elected member of the National Institute of Social Sciences; a member of the Women's City Club of New York; a member and sometime vice-president of the Woman's Suffrage Study Club; in much later life she was a member and from 1953 president of the Little Gardens Club of New York City; and a member and sometime vice-president of the Women's Farm and Garden Association.

Her lecturing activities continued throughout her life, in addition to which she served in 1924 as an Assistant in the Oral English Department at Harvard, and from 1948 to 1950 as a lecturer at the Barmore School in New York City.

She married two or three times: first to Captain L. Rodney Berg in 1925 until his death in 1941, taking the name Portia Willis-Berg. She is recorded thereafter as marrying a prince of Thurn und Taxis. (Note: This claim may be in error, a possible confusion with Lida Eleanor Nicolls, who became Princess Lida of Thurn and Taxis upon her second marriage, having previously been married to one Gerald Purcell Fitzgerald, a person who shared the same name as Willis's husband from 1958.) In 1958, she was married to Gerald Purcell-FitzGerald, a musician and linguist.

She died on 7 July 1970.
