= William J. Sinon =

American politician (1854–1898)

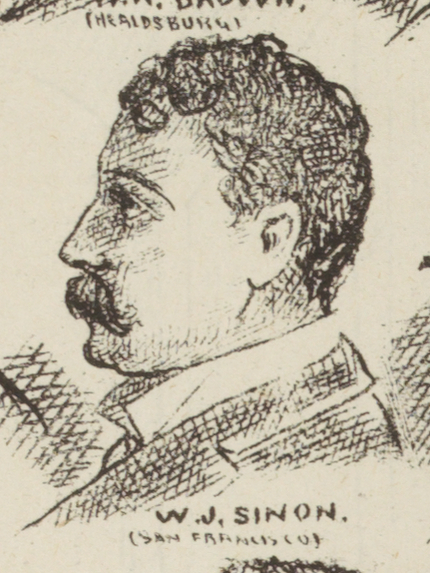
- Sketch by Carl Browne, 1880

Member of the California State Assembly from the 9th district
- In office January 8, 1883 – January 5, 1885
- Preceded by: Multi-member district
- Succeeded by: John M. Ward
- In office January 5, 1880 – January 3, 1881
- Preceded by: Multi-member district
- Succeeded by: Multi-member district

Personal details
- Born: 1854 Brantford, Province of Canada
- Died: December 8, 1898 (aged 44) San Francisco, California, U.S.
- Resting place: Holy Cross Cemetery; Colma, California, U.S.
- Party: Workingmen's (before 1881); Democratic (after 1881)
- Children: Genevieve
- Education: St. Ignatius College
- Occupation: Carpenter, politician

William J. Sinon (1854 – December 8, 1898) was a Canadian American carpenter and politician who served two non-consecutive terms in the California State Assembly, from 1880 to 1881 and from 1883 to 1885. He was an officer in the Workingmen's Party of California, and during his first term denounced fellow WPC assemblyman Stephen J. Garibaldi as the "Judas Iscariot of the party" for voting against them on a revenue bill. He was later active in the Democratic Party, campaigning on behalf of Winfield Scott Hancock during the 1880 presidential election.

During his second term, Sinon authored legislation establishing the California Bureau of Labor Statistics, the ninth such agency in the country. (Note: The first was in Massachusetts, established in 1869.) Governor George Stoneman appointed former state senator John S. Enos, another member of the Workingmen's Party, as its first head, drawing criticism that the office had been created specifically for his benefit.

== Sources ==
- "DIED". The San Francisco Call. San Francisco. December 9, 1898.
