= William Morton Grinnell =

American government official

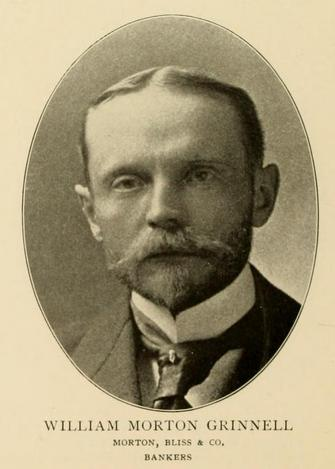

Third Assistant Secretary of State
- In office February 15, 1892 – April 16, 1893
- Preceded by: John Bassett Moore
- Succeeded by: Edward Henry Strobel

Personal details
- Born: February 28, 1857 New York City, New York, U.S.
- Died: February 9, 1906 (aged 48) New York City, New York, U.S.
- Spouse: Elizabeth Lee Ernst (m. 1898)
- Children: 2
- Relatives: Levi P. Morton (uncle); Daniel O. Morton (uncle)
- Education: Phillips Exeter Academy; Harvard College
- Alma mater: Columbia Law School

William Morton Grinnell (February 28, 1857 – February 9, 1906) was an American lawyer, diplomat, banker and author.

== Early life ==
William Morton Grinnell was born in New York City on February 28, 1857, the son of William F. Grinnell and Mary (Morton) Grinnell (sister of Levi P. Morton). Another uncle, Daniel Oliver Morton (1815–59), served as the Mayor of Toledo, Ohio from 1849 to 1850.

He was educated in Stuttgart and at Phillips Exeter Academy. He then studied at Harvard College, but left without taking a degree because of health problems, traveling to France, where his father had recently been appointed U.S. Consul at Saint-Étienne. William Morton Grinnell worked for a while for the United States Consulate in Lyon. He then attended Columbia Law School.

== Career ==
After he was admitted to the bar, Grinnell practiced law briefly in New York City. In 1881, he traveled to Paris, becoming Counsel of the U.S. Embassy there, a post he held until 1886. While in France, he received degrees of bachelier ès lettres and bachelier en droit. He returned to the United States and resumed his practice of law there in 1886.

In 1892, President Benjamin Harrison appointed Grinnell Third Assistant Secretary of State, with Grinnell holding this office from February 15, 1892, until April 16, 1893.

Grinnell then returned to New York City to practice law. In 1894, he joined the banking house of Morton, Bliss & Co. (run by his mother's family), and remained there following its incorporation into the Morton Trust. His work there was interrupted by the outbreak of the Spanish–American War in 1898, at which time he joined the United States Army with the rank of Major. He returned to banking after the war.

In addition to his work, Grinnell was a director of the Illinois Central Railroad, the Gunly Mountain Coal Company, the Mount Morris Bank, the Rio Grande, Sierra Madre & Pacific Railway, and the Sea Beach Land Company. He also published several books on contemporaneous social and economic questions.

== Personal life ==
On December 8, 1898, Grinnell married Elizabeth Lee Ernst (1871–1944), daughter of Oswald Herbert Ernst, the superintendent of the United States Military Academy. Together, they had two children: Elizabeth Lee Grinnell (1900–1993), who married Henry L. Abbott. and George Morton Grinnell (1902–1953).

Grinnell died of pneumonia in New York City on February 9, 1906.

== Works ==
- A Comparative Glance at the French Code Civil and the Proposed New York Civil Code (1886)
- The Regeneration of the United States: A Forecast of Its Industrial Evolution (1899)
- Social Theories and Social Facts (1905)

Government offices
Preceded by John Bassett Moore	Third Assistant Secretary of State; February 15, 1892 – April 16, 1893	Succeeded by Edward Henry Strobel
