= Stephen J. Garibaldi =

American politician (1853–1937)

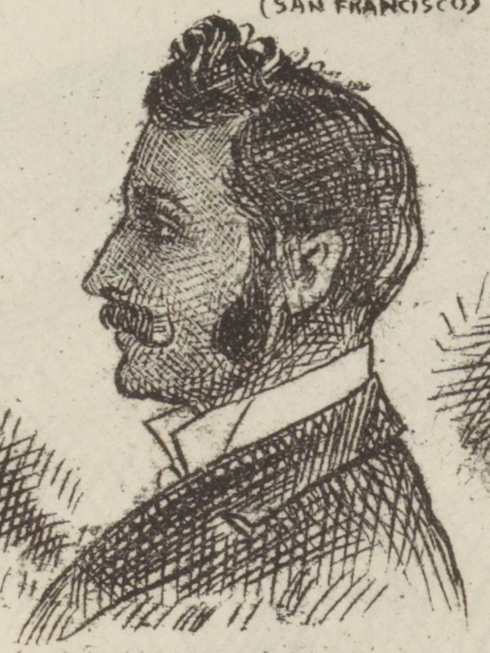
- Sketch by Carl Browne, 1880

Member of the California State Assembly from the 9th district
- In office January 5, 1880 – January 3, 1881
- Preceded by: Multi-member district
- Succeeded by: Multi-member district

Personal details
- Born: October 22, 1853 Boston, Massachusetts, U.S.
- Died: January 12, 1937 (aged 83) San Francisco, California, U.S.
- Party: Workingmen's (before 1881); Republican (after 1881)
- Spouse: Sarah Van Ness (died 1903)
- Children: Stephen Jr.; Gertrude; George
- Occupation: Grocer, politician

Stephen Joseph Garibaldi (October 22, 1853 – January 12, 1937) was an American grocer and politician who served in the California State Assembly from 1880 to 1881. He was a member of the Swiss-Italian Club of the Workingmen's Party of California, and during his term was denounced by fellow WPC assemblyman William J. Sinon as the "Judas Iscariot of the party" for voting against them on a revenue bill. He was later active in the Republican Party, running unsuccessfully for State Assembly in 1886.

Garibaldi outlived his wife Sarah by 33 years. Her brother, Egisto C. Palmieri, served in the California State Senate from 1885 to 1887.
