= Daniel O. Morton =

American politician (1815–1859)

Daniel Oliver Morton
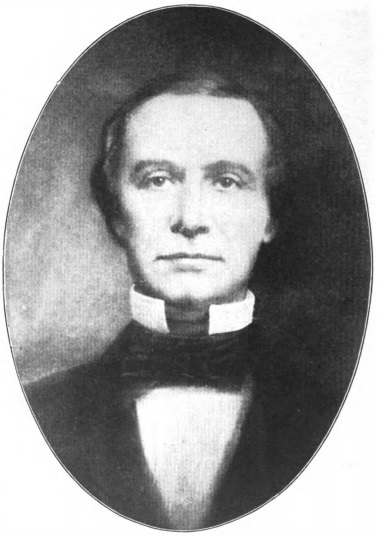
- From Volume 1 of 1910's Memoirs of Lucas County and the City of Toledo.

8th Mayor of Toledo, Ohio
- In office 1849–1850
- Preceded by: Emery D. Potter
- Succeeded by: Caleb F. Abbott

Personal details
- Born: November 8, 1815 Shoreham, Vermont, U.S.
- Died: December 5, 1859 (aged 44) Toledo, Ohio, U.S.
- Party: Democratic
- Spouse: Elizabeth A. Tyler
- Children: 7
- Relatives: Levi P. Morton (brother); William Morton Grinnell (nephew)
- Education: Middlebury College

Daniel Oliver Morton (November 8, 1815 – December 5, 1859) was a lawyer from Toledo, Ohio, who was a United States Attorney and Mayor of Toledo.

== Education ==
Daniel Oliver Morton was born November 8, 1815, at Shoreham, Vermont, son of Rev. Daniel Oliver Morton (1788–1852) and Lucretia Parsons Morton (1789–1862). He was the oldest of six children of the couple, including his brother, Vice President Levi P. Morton. He graduated with honors from Middlebury College in the class of 1833. He removed to Cleveland, Ohio, and studied law in the offices of Hiram V. Willson & Henry B. Payne.

== Professional ==
After admission to the bar, Morton moved to Toledo, Ohio, where he practiced. A Democrat, he served on the Toledo City Council and as City Attorney before serving as Mayor of Toledo from 1849 to 1850. Morton was also appointed a Master Commissioner in Chancery for the courts of Lucas County. In 1852 and 1853, Morton was one of three Commissioners on Practice and Pleadings who reformed Ohio's Code of Civil Procedure. He was appointed United States Attorney for the District of Ohio in 1854 by Franklin Pierce. In 1855, the district was divided into Northern and Southern Districts by 10 Stat. 604, and Morton became Attorney for the Northern District of Ohio, serving until 1857.

== Personal life ==
Morton was married to Elizabeth A. Tyler (1817–1873) on December 31, 1839, at Ohio City, Ohio. They had seven children at Toledo, four of whom died in childhood. He died December 5, 1859, at Toledo, and was buried there.

== Bibliography ==
- Harney, Gilbert L. (1888). The lives of Benjamin Harrison and Levi P. Morton. J A & R A Reid. pp. 246–247.
- Leach, Josiah Granville (1894). Memoranda relating to the ancestry and family of Hon. Levi Parson Morton . Cambridge, Massachusetts: Riverside Press. pp. 36–39.
- Scribner, Harvey, ed. (1910). Memoirs of Lucas County and the city of Toledo: from the earliest ... Vol. 1. Madison, Wisconsin: Western Historical Association. p. 240.
- Doyle, John H. (1919). A story of early Toledo: historical facts and incidents of the early days of the City and its Environs. Bowling Green, Ohio: C. S. Van Tassel.
- "History of the U.S. Attorney Southern District of Ohio". United States Attorney's Office Southern District of Ohio.
