= St. Paul's Episcopal Church (Hicksville, Ohio) =

Historic church in Ohio, United States

- U.S. National Register of Historic Places
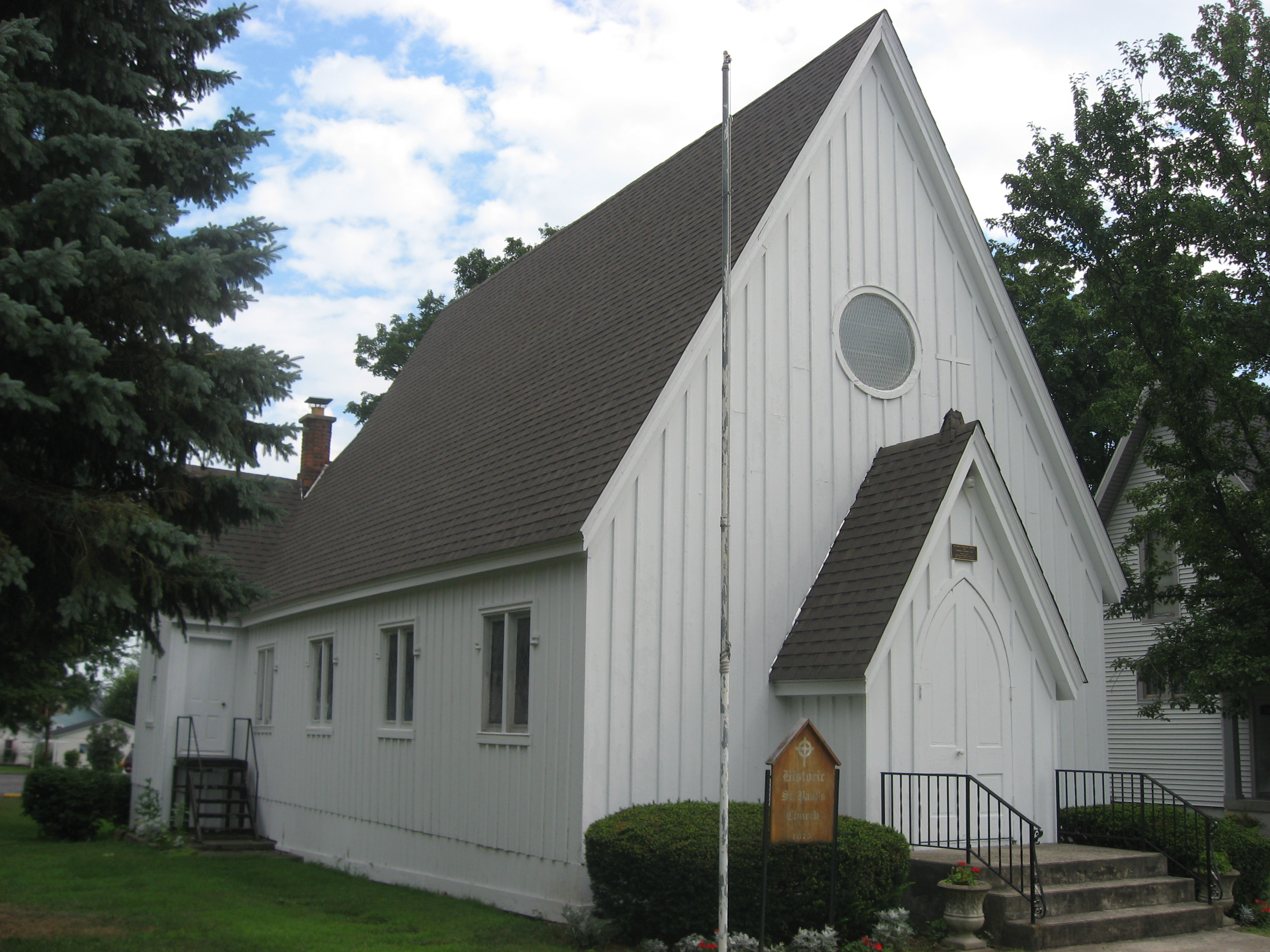

- Location within Ohio Location within the United States
- Location: High St., Hicksville, Ohio
- Coordinates: 41°17′31″N 84°45′49″W
- Area: 0 acres (0 ha)
- Built: 1873
- Architect: Joseph C. Talbot; builder: Alfred Peck Edgerton
- Architectural style: Carpenter Gothic
- NRHP reference No.: 76001414
- Added to NRHP: June 07, 1976

St. Paul's Episcopal Church is a historic Episcopal church building located on High Street in Hicksville, Ohio, United States.

== Description ==
Based on Carpenter Gothic style designs supplied by Joseph C. Talbot, bishop of the Episcopal Diocese of Indiana, it was built in 1873 by Alfred Peck Edgerton, developer of Hicksville and former United States Congressman from Ohio. Although the church lacks the lancet windows usually found in Carpenter Gothic churches, it does feature the steep sloping roof, board and batten siding, rosette window and lancet-shaped front entrance that are typical of such buildings.

== History ==
Consecrated on October 17, 1875, the church is still owned by the Episcopal Diocese of Ohio, although it is no longer an active parish. The building is maintained by the Hicksville Historical Society which in 1976 rescued it from a state of disrepair. It is still used occasionally for weddings and other events. On June 7, 1976, it was added to the National Register of Historic Places.
