= William Sawyer (American politician) =

American politician (1803–1877)

Member of the U.S. House of Representatives from Ohio's 5th district
- In office March 4, 1845 – March 3, 1849
- Preceded by: Emery D. Potter
- Succeeded by: Emery D. Potter

Member of the Ohio House of Representatives from Auglaize County
- In office January 7, 1856 – January 3, 1858
- Preceded by: John Walkup
- Succeeded by: G. W. Andrews

Member of the Ohio House of Representatives from Montgomery County
- In office December 3, 1832 – December 4, 1836
- Preceded by: C. G. Swayne; M. Shideler
- Succeeded by: Robert A. Thurston

Personal details
- Born: August 5, 1803 Montgomery County, Ohio
- Died: September 18, 1877 (aged 74) St. Marys, Ohio
- Resting place: Elm Grove Cemetery
- Party: Democratic

William Sawyer (1803 – 1877) was an American tradesman who served as a two-term member of the United States House of Representatives from Ohio from 1845 to 1849.

== Biography ==
Sawyer was born in Montgomery County, Ohio. In 1818 he began to learn the trade of blacksmithing. He worked at this occupation in both Dayton, Ohio, and Grand Rapids, Michigan. In 1829 he settled in Miamisburg, Ohio. From 1832 to 1835 Sawyer served in the Ohio House of Representatives, filling the position of speaker in 1835. In 1838 and 1840 he ran unsuccessfully for congress.

In 1843 Sawyer moved to St. Marys, Ohio.

=== Congress ===
He was elected to United States Congress as a Democrat in 1844. He was reelected in 1846 but did not run for re-election in 1848.

Sawyer 'liked to stand by the Speaker's chair during debates noisily munching sausages and cornbread and using his pants for a napkin and his jack-knife for a toothpick'.

=== Later political activities ===
In 1850-1851 Sawyer served as a member of the Ohio State Constitutional Convention. He served another term in the State House in 1856. He also served as mayor of St. Marys and a Federal land agent in Minnesota.

[Sawyer] would never submit to the slave States sending their emancipated blacks within her borders or colonies. He...said, if the test must come, the banks of the Ohio (a mile wide) would be lined with men with muskets on their shoulders to keep off the emancipated slaves which the slave States might attempt to throw in among them.

— Narration of William Sawyer's speech in United States House of Representatives, June 22, 1848, source

== Sources ==
- Congressional biography

U.S. House of Representatives
Preceded by Emery D. Potter	Member of the U.S. House of Representatives from Ohio's 5th congressional district March 4, 1845–March 3, 1849	Succeeded by Emery D. Potter
Ohio House of Representatives
Preceded by C. G. Swayne; M. Shideler	Representative from Montgomery County; December 3, 1832-December 4, 1836; Served alongside: Henry Shideler; George C. Davis; Morris Seely; Horace Pease; Elias Matthews; Fielding Lowery	Succeeded by Robert A. Thurston
Preceded by John Walkup	Representative from Auglaize County; January 7, 1856-January 3, 1858; Served alongside: G. W. Andrews	Succeeded by G. W. Andrews
Preceded by John M. Creed	Speaker of the House; December 7, 1835-December 4, 1836	Succeeded by William Medill
