= Astor Home for Children =

Building in Rhinebeck, New York

- Astor Services
- U.S. National Register of Historic Places
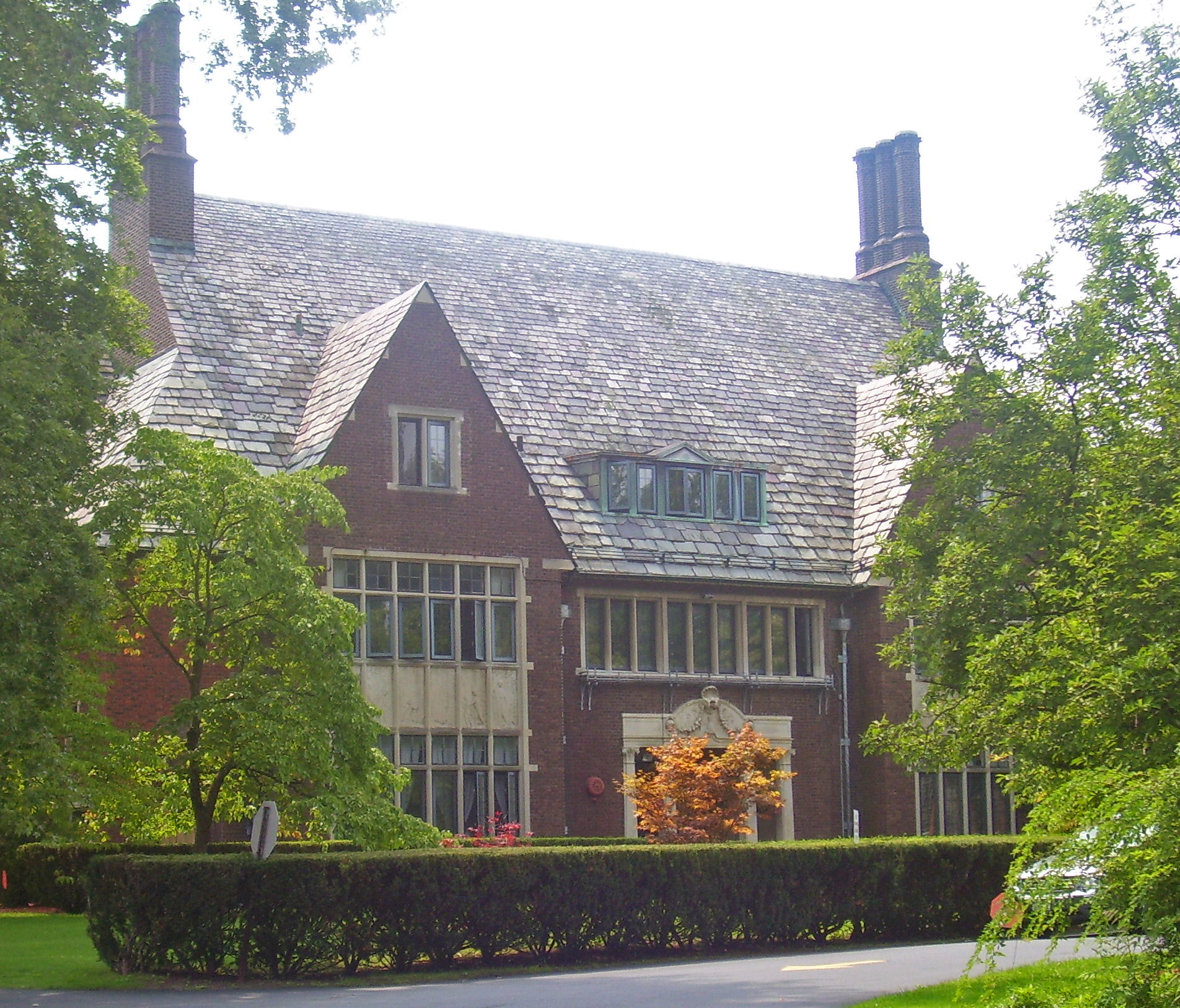
- North facade, 2008
- Location: Rhinebeck, New York
- Nearest city: Kingston
- Coordinates: 41°55′27″N 73°54′46″W
- Area: 18.4 acres (7.4 ha)
- Built: 1914
- Architect: McKim, Mead & White
- Architectural style: Jacobean Revival
- MPS: Rhinebeck Town MRA
- NRHP reference No.: 87001098
- Added to NRHP: 1987

The Astor Home for Children building, home to Astor Services, is on Mill Street (US 9) in Rhinebeck, New York, United States. It is sponsored by Catholic Charities in the Archdiocese of New York, and provides mental health services to children on an inpatient and outpatient basis. The institution began in 1904 as Holiday Farm in nearby Rhinecliff.

In 1914, Vincent Astor hired the New York City architectural firm of McKim, Mead & White to design the present building for the facility. Catholic Charities took over ownership upon Astor's death three decades later. In the mid-20th century, major additions were made to the property, but enough of its original buildings remain for it to be listed on the National Register of Historic Places in 1987.

== History ==
Alice Morton, daughter of former state governor and U.S. Vice President Levi P. Morton, founded Holiday Farm in 1902 as a home for convalescent children. It accepted boys age six to nine, and girls six to fifteen. The group did not accept the "feeble-minded", nor those with heart conditions. The children had to present a doctor's certificate that neither they, nor anyone in their family was contagious. They were picked up at Grand Central Station and brought to Rhinebeck. Train fare, board and clothing were provided free. In 1917, Vincent Astor served as president, with Helen Dinsmore Huntington as Secretary.

Ten years later it bought the current property for $1 after another wealthy and prominent part-time resident of the area, Vincent Astor, hired McKim, Mead & White to design the building. At that point the property consisted of the home, with only its east wing, and the guest cottage, possibly used as a staff residence.

At some point later, the facility was renamed the John Jacob Astor Home For Convalescent Children. In 1945, Catholic Charities took over operation of the home. Seven years later, in 1952, they decided to change the focus of the program to children with emotional problems. The two west wings were added in 1954 and 1963 respectively to facilitate this new mission. Vincent Astor died on February 3, 1959.

In 1966 the home opened an outpatient facility in Rhinebeck. Eight years later, in 1974, it became one of the first mental health facilities in the country accredited by the Joint Commission, and in 1978 began operating Head Start in Dutchess County. The Astor Learning Center, a private school for children with emotional problems, was opened on the grounds in 1980. In recognition of this expanded programming, the new name was adopted in 2009.

== Property ==
The Astor Home is on an 18.4-acre (7.4 ha) parcel, bounded on the east by Route 9 and on the south by Landsman Kill. It is gently undulating and mostly wooded. Two of the five buildings and structures on it, the home and a guest cottage, are considered contributing resources to its listing on the National Register.

=== Main building ===
A short circular driveway leads from Route 9 to the parking lot, where the main building's northern entrance facade dominates. It is an H-shaped two-story building with a steeply pitched cross-gabled slate roof. It has many distinctive Jacobean features, such as vertical emphasis via the roof gables from which rise brick chimneys with corbeled chimney pots. There are projecting end wings and classically inspired door and window decoration trimmed in stone. The main entrance is located in a portico with four Corinthian columns supporting a full entablature done in bas-relief.

On the rear, two-story wings project from the southeast and southwest corners. The east has a brick and stucco wing with decorative brickwork in a diagonal pattern above the first story. There are two wings on the east, both later additions of brick and concrete. A chapel and another, smaller wing are attached to the corners of one. All the wings on this elevation are considered non-contributing since they were added in the mid-20th century.

The building's interior has been extensively modified over the years to serve the facility's needs. It retains little of its original floor plan.

=== Outbuildings ===
Near the west wing are the two non-contributing buildings on the property, both modern garages. A swimming pool, likewise too new to be contributing, is located to the south of.

Several hundred yards to the south of the main building is the other contributing resource, the guest cottage. It is a clapboard-sided frame two-story house on a stone foundation built into a hillside so that only one story is exposed on the north (rear) facade. Its gabled roof has overhanging eaves. A two-tiered porch runs along the entire south facade.
