= John S. Enos =

American politician (1825–1898)

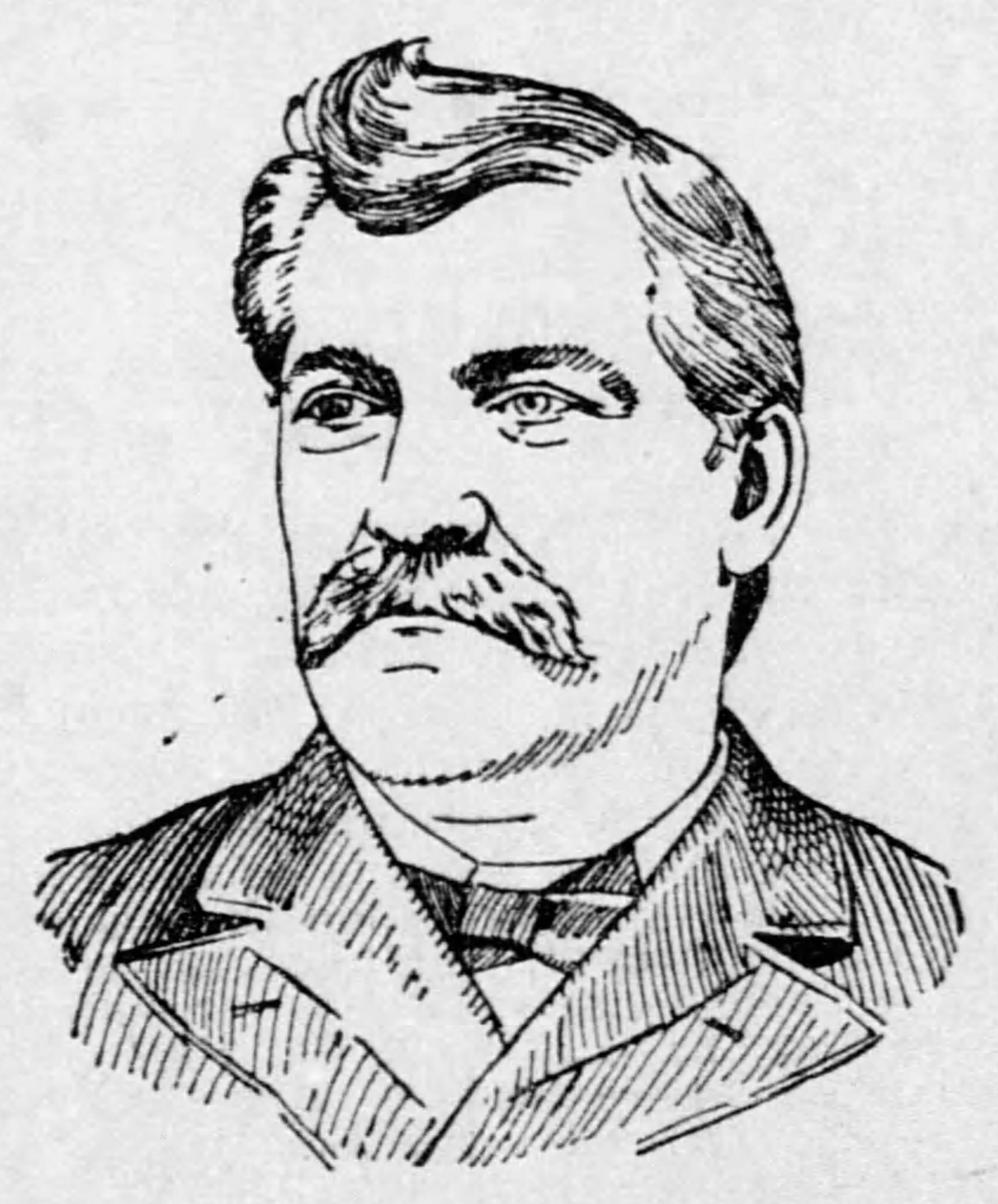
- Enos c. 1892

1st Commissioner of the California Bureau of Labor Statistics
- In office March 8, 1883 – March 9, 1887
- Appointed by: George Stoneman
- Preceded by: Office established
- Succeeded by: John J. Tobin

Member of the California Senate from the 13th district
- In office January 5, 1880 – January 8, 1883
- Preceded by: Multi-member district
- Succeeded by: Multi-member district

8th District Attorney of Fulton County
- In office November 1853 – November 1859
- Preceded by: James W. Dudley
- Succeeded by: John M. Carroll

Personal details
- Born: 1825 Fulton County, New York, U.S.
- Died: March 30, 1898 (aged 72) Sonoma, California, U.S.
- Party: Whig (before 1854); Republican (1854–1875, after 1888); Democratic (1875–1877, 1881–1888); Workingmen's (1877–1881)
- Other political affiliations: Liberal Republican (1872); Anti-Boss (1886); Non-Partisan (1892); Citizens' Independent (1896)
- Spouse: Susie T. Willis
- Domestic partner: Rachel Jane Snyder
- Children: Gertrude
- Relatives: Benjamin A. Willis (relative)
- Occupation: Attorney, politician

John Summerfield Enos (1825 – March 30, 1898) was an American attorney and politician who served as the eighth district attorney of Fulton County, New York from 1853 to 1859, in the California State Senate from 1880 to 1883, and as the first commissioner of the California Bureau of Labor Statistics from 1883 to 1887.

== Electoral career ==
"Lawyer Enos as a New Contortionist," a caricature of Enos published in Thistleton's Illustrated Jolly Giant, June 30, 1877

Enos was an unsuccessful candidate for district attorney of San Francisco in 1877 and judge of the police court in 1886, 1894 and 1896. He was also nominated for Congress in 1880 and 1890, but declined the nomination both times. During his career, he supported several third parties attempting to break the rule of political bosses in the city.

== California Bureau of Labor Statistics ==
In 1883, state assemblyman William J. Sinon (like Enos a member of the Workingmen's Party of California) authored legislation establishing the California Bureau of Labor Statistics, the ninth such agency in the country. (Note: The first was in Massachusetts, established in 1869.) Governor George Stoneman appointed Enos as its first head, drawing criticism that the office had been created specifically for his benefit.

During his tenure, Enos opposed convict labor on the grounds that it created competition for free laborers. He supported the eight-hour workday and recommended public works be administered directly by governments instead of contractors. He also recommended the state avoid sericulture for the excessive amount of cheap labor it required, and promoted the production of beet sugar and sorghum to bolster the economy.

== Enos v. Snyder ==
Enos died of a heart attack in Sonoma, California on March 30, 1898, aged 72. At the time of his death, he had for several years lived with Rachel Jane Snyder, to whom he was not married. In his will, Enos instructed that the disposition of his remains would be left to Snyder. After Enos's death, Susie T. Enos and Gertrude Willis—his wife and daughter, respectively—demanded that Snyder release his remains to them. When Snyder refused this demand, they took her to court and won custody of Enos's remains.

== Works ==
- First Biennial Report of the Bureau of Labor Statistics of California. Sacramento: California State Printing Office. 1884.
- Second Biennial Report of the Bureau of Labor Statistics of California. Sacramento: California State Printing Office. 1886.

== See also ==
- Enos v. Snyder

== Sources ==
- Barish, Marvin I. (1956). "The Law of Testamentary Disposition—A Legal Barrier to Medical Advance!". Temple Law Quarterly. 30 (1): 40–46 – via HeinOnline.
- "THE DEMOCRATIC CANVASS". San Francisco Chronicle. San Francisco. July 9, 1875.
- "DEMOCRATIC ELOQUENCE". Vallejo Chronicle. Vallejo. September 4, 1876.
- "THE REPUBLICANS". The Daily Examiner. San Francisco. August 1, 1888.
- "ON THE STUMP". The Morning Call. San Francisco. October 9, 1888.
- "AN ABLE DEFENSE FOR PROTECTION". Weekly Galt Gazette. Galt. October 27, 1888.
- "THE LAST PARADE". Oakland Daily Evening Tribune. Oakland. November 3, 1888.
