= Benjamin A. Willis =

American politician

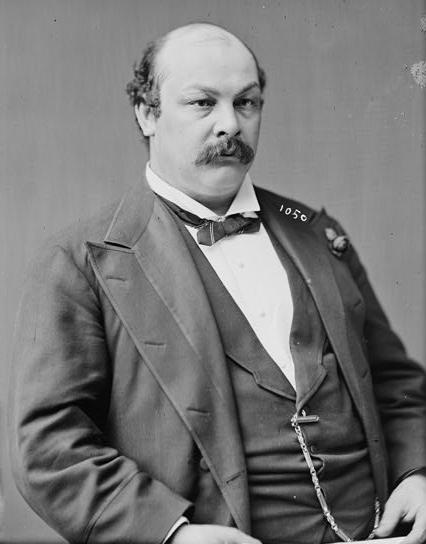
- Willis, 1865–1880

Member of the U.S. House of Representatives from New York's 11th district
- In office March 4, 1875 – March 3, 1879
- Preceded by: Clarkson N. Potter
- Succeeded by: Levi P. Morton

Personal details
- Born: March 24, 1840 Roslyn, New York, U.S.
- Died: October 14, 1886 (aged 46) New York City, New York, U.S.
- Spouse: Lillie Evelyn Macauley
- Children: Kate; Portia; Benjamin Jr.
- Relatives: John S. Enos (relative)

Benjamin Albertson Willis (March 24, 1840 – October 14, 1886) was a U.S. representative from New York.

== Biography ==
Willis was born in Roslyn, New York, the eldest son of Charles Willis and Abigail Albertson. He graduated from Union College in 1861, where he had studied law. He was admitted to the bar in 1862, and commenced practice in New York City. During the Civil War, he enlisted in the Union Army in 1862. He served as captain in the 119th New York Infantry Regiment, and subsequently colonel of the 12th New York Volunteer Infantry. He was honorably discharged in 1864. He resumed the practice of law and was a member of the New York State Assembly from 1872 to 1878.

Willis was elected as a Democrat to the Forty-fourth and Forty-fifth Congresses (March 4, 1875 – March 3, 1879). He served as chairman of the United States House Committee on Expenditures in the Navy Department during the Forty-fifth Congress. He was an unsuccessful candidate for reelection in 1878 to the Forty-sixth Congress. He engaged in the practice of law and also in the real estate business. He married Lillie Evelyn Macauley, daughter of William Macauley and Mary S. Underhill, and had three children: Kate T. Willis, Portia Willis and Benjamin A. Willis Jr. He was a relative of California State Senator John S. Enos.

Willis died in New York City on October 14, 1886. He was interred in Friends Cemetery in Westbury, New York, and later reinterred in Woodlawn Cemetery.

U.S. House of Representatives
Preceded by Clarkson N. Potter	Member of the U.S. House of Representatives from New York's 11th congressional district 1875–1879	Succeeded by Levi P. Morton
