= Enos v. Snyder =

- Supreme Court of California

Decided December 21, 1900,
- Full case name: Susie T. Enos and Gertrude Willis v. Rachel Jane Snyder and E. S. Lippitt
- Citation(s): 63 P. 170, 131 Cal. 68, 53 L.R.A. 221, 82 Am. St. Rep. 330, 1900 Cal. LEXIS 735

Case history
- Subsequent history: Hearing in Bank denied
- Procedural history: Appeal from the Superior Court of Sonoma County

Court membership
- Judge(s) sitting: McFarland, Temple, Henshaw

Case opinions
- Majority: McFarland, joined by Temple and Henshaw
- Superseded by
- California Statutes (1947), Chapter 126, §1; California Statutes (1947), Chapter 125, §1

Enos v. Snyder, 63 P. 170 (Cal. 1900), was a case decided by the Supreme Court of California holding that a will could not serve to transfer a testator's dead body away from the next of kin, and that the next of kin's right to custody of a dead body defeats any right of the executor. The holding was at least partly superseded by statute in 1947, permitting testators to dispose of their remains via will for certain purposes.

== Facts and procedural background ==
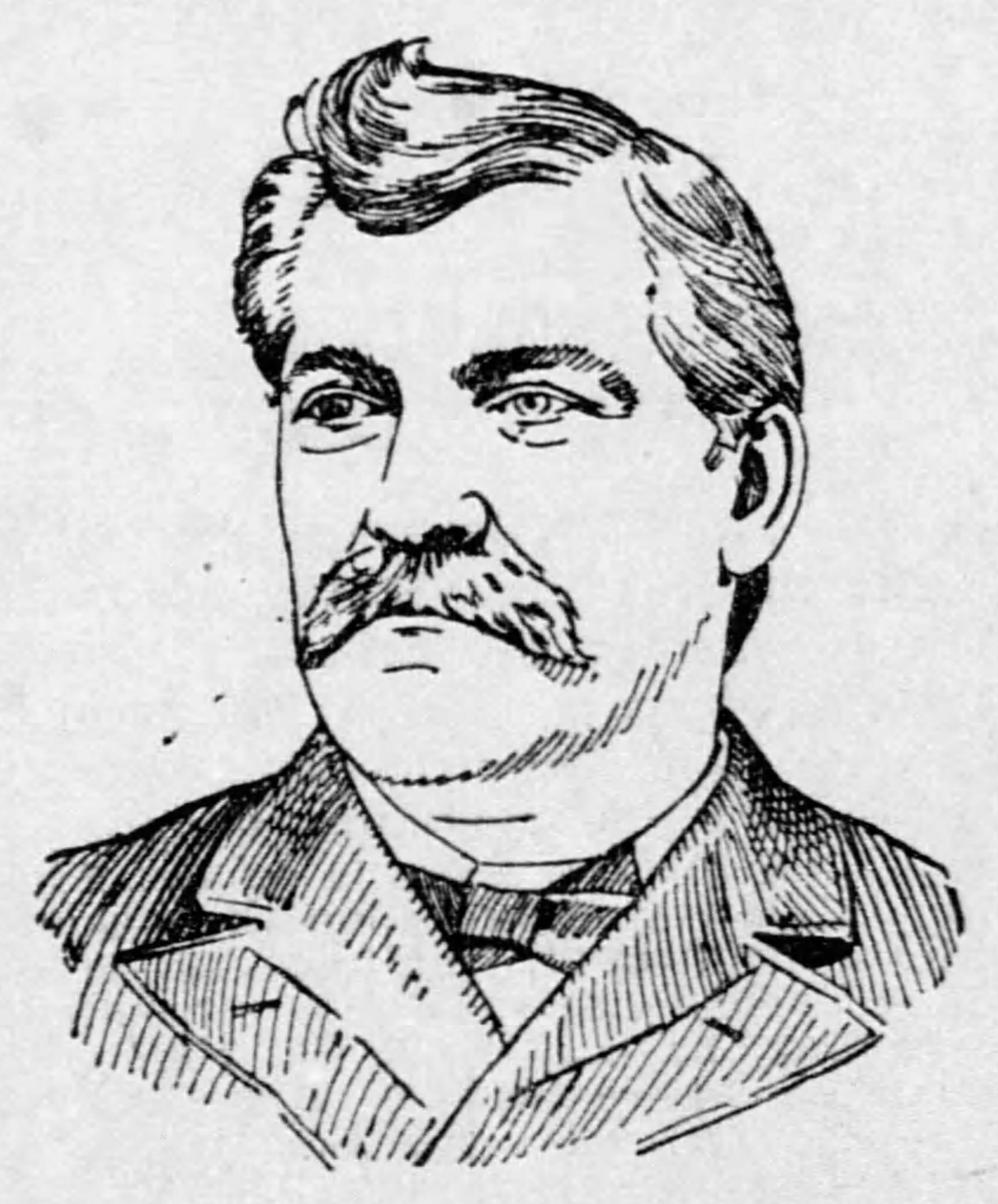
An engraving of Enos published in The San Francisco Call, November 6, 1892

John S. Enos, formerly a California State Senator, died aged 72 in Sonoma, California on March 30, 1898, of a heart attack. At the time of his death, he had for several years lived with Rachel Jane Snyder, to whom he was not married. In his will, Enos instructed that the disposition of his remains would be left to Snyder. After Enos' death, Susie T. Enos and Gertrude Willis—John Enos' wife and daughter, respectively—demanded that Snyder release John Enos' remains to them. They commenced the action when Snyder refused this demand. E.S. Lippitt, the executor of Enos' will, was made a defendant upon his application. The lower court awarded judgment to the plaintiffs, and the defendants appealed.

== Holding ==
The general English and American authorities on the subject are not very satisfactory . . . . It is quite well established, however, by those authorities that, in the absence of statutory provisions, there is no property in a dead body, that it is not part of the estate of the deceased person, and that a man cannot by will dispose of that which after his death will be his corpse.

— Enos v. Snyder, 131 Cal. 68, 69 (1900).

In an opinion by Justice McFarland, the court affirmed the Superior Court's invalidation of John Enos' testamentary disposition of his remains. In reaching this judgment, the court cited the 1882 English case of Williams v. Williams, distinguished O'Donnell v. Slack, 123 Cal. 285 (1890), and applied California law.

In Williams, the testator had instructed his executors to give his remains to his mistress for cremation. At the insistence of the next of kin, his remains were buried instead. Subsequently, the testator's mistress obtained a license to exhume and rebury the remains. She had them transported to Milan, cremated and buried, whereupon she sued the executors and next of kin for reimbursement of her expenses. The High Court of Justice, Chancery Division held that the plaintiff could not recover as, among other reasons, a gift of a decedent's remains is invalid.
