= Levi P. Morton =

Vice President of the United States from 1889 to 1893

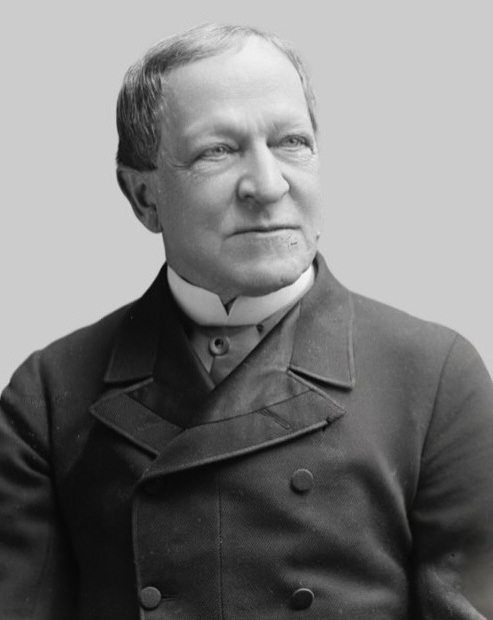
- Morton c. 1889

22nd Vice President of the United States
- In office March 4, 1889 – March 4, 1893
- President: Benjamin Harrison
- Preceded by: Thomas A. Hendricks
- Succeeded by: Adlai Stevenson I

31st Governor of New York
- In office January 1, 1895 – December 31, 1896
- Lieutenant: Charles T. Saxton
- Preceded by: Roswell P. Flower
- Succeeded by: Frank S. Black

25th United States Minister to France
- In office August 5, 1881 – May 14, 1885
- President: James A. Garfield; Chester A. Arthur; Grover Cleveland
- Preceded by: Edward Follansbee Noyes
- Succeeded by: Robert Milligan McLane

Member of the U.S. House of Representatives from New York's 11th district
- In office March 4, 1879 – March 21, 1881
- Preceded by: Benjamin A. Willis
- Succeeded by: Roswell P. Flower

Personal details
- Born: Levi Parsons Morton; May 16, 1824 Shoreham, Vermont, U.S.
- Died: May 16, 1920 (aged 96) Rhinebeck, New York, U.S.
- Resting place: Rhinebeck Cemetery, Rhinebeck, New York
- Party: Republican
- Spouses: Lucy Young Kimball (m. 1856; died 1871) Anna Livingston Reade Street (m. 1873; died 1918)
- Children: 7
- Relatives: Daniel O. Morton (brother); William Morton Grinnell (nephew)
- Profession: Investment banker

Levi Parsons Morton (May 16, 1824 – May 16, 1920) was the 22nd vice president of the United States from 1889 to 1893. He also served as United States ambassador to France, as a United States representative from New York, and as the 31st governor of New York.

The son of a Congregational minister, Morton was born in Vermont and educated at public schools in Vermont and Massachusetts. He trained for a business career by clerking in stores and working in mercantile establishments in Massachusetts and New Hampshire. After relocating to New York City, Morton became a successful merchant, cotton broker, and investment banker.

Active in politics as a Republican, Morton was an ally of Roscoe Conkling. He was twice elected to the United States House of Representatives, and he served one full term, and one partial one (March 4, 1879 – March 21, 1881). In 1880, Republican presidential nominee James A. Garfield offered Morton the vice presidential nomination in an effort to win over Conkling loyalists who were disappointed that their choice for president, Ulysses S. Grant, had lost the Republican nomination to Garfield. Conkling advised Morton to decline, which he did. Garfield then offered the vice presidential nomination to another Conkling ally, Chester A. Arthur, who accepted.

After Garfield and Arthur were elected, Garfield nominated Morton to be Minister Plenipotentiary to France, and Morton served in Paris until 1885. In 1888, Morton was nominated for vice president on the Republican ticket with presidential nominee Benjamin Harrison; they were elected, and Morton served as vice president from 1889 to 1893. In 1894, Morton was the successful Republican nominee for governor of New York, and he served one term, 1895 to 1896. In retirement, Morton resided in New York City and Rhinebeck, New York. He died from pneumonia on his 96th birthday in 1920, and was buried at Rhinebeck Cemetery.

== Early life ==
Morton was born in Shoreham, Vermont, on May 16, 1824, one of six children born to the Reverend Daniel Oliver Morton, a Congregational minister, and Lucretia Parsons. Morton was of entirely English ancestry, all of his ancestors came to North America from England during the Puritan migration to New England. His paternal ancestors included Captain Nathaniel Morton of Plymouth Colony. Morton was named for his mother's brother Reverend Levi Parsons (1792–1822), a clergyman who was also the first U.S. missionary to work in Palestine. His older brother, Daniel Oliver Morton, served as the Mayor of Toledo, Ohio, from 1849 to 1850. His younger sister, Mary Morton, was married to William F. Grinnell, and was the mother of William Morton Grinnell, who served as the Third Assistant Secretary of State while Morton was vice president.

Morton's family moved to Springfield, Vermont, in 1832, when his father became the minister of the Congregational church there. Rev. Morton headed the congregation during the construction of the brick colonial revival-style church on Main Street that is still in use. Levi Morton was considered by his Springfield peers to be a "leader in all affairs in which schoolboys usually engage." The Morton family later moved to Winchendon, Massachusetts, where Reverend Morton continued to serve as a church pastor. In 1838, Levi Morton graduated from the academy in Shoreham, Vermont.

== Career ==
=== Businessman ===
Morton decided on a business career, and in 1838 he began work as a general store clerk in Enfield, Massachusetts. He taught school in Boscawen, New Hampshire, and engaged in mercantile pursuits in Hanover, New Hampshire, then moved to Boston to work in the Beebe & Co. importing business. He eventually settled in New York City, where he entered the dry goods business in partnership with George Blake Grinnell and became a successful cotton broker. He then established himself as one of the country's top investment bankers in a firm he founded, Morton, Bliss & Co., which was later reorganized as the Morton Trust Company.

During the American Civil War, Morton supported the Union. Unable to obtain cotton from the southern states because of the Union blockade, Morton suspended his cotton business for the duration of the conflict. After the war, Morton and his British partner, Sir John Rose, recovered their financial positions and improved their political fortunes by using their contacts to assist the United States and England to settle the Alabama Claims. When England agreed to pay a $15 million settlement (about $307 million in 2020), Morton's bank was chosen to facilitate payments to claimants in the United States.

In addition to operating Morton, Bliss & Co., Morton was active in several other businesses. These included the board of directors of the New York Viaduct Railway Company, Guaranty Trust Company, Washington Life Insurance Company, Home Insurance Company, and Equitable Life Assurance Society. In addition, he was an investor in numerous ventures, including the Rio Grande, Sierra Madre & Pacific Railway, Virginia Iron, Coal & Coke Company, and Intercontinental Rubber Company. Morton also maintained a farm on his estate, where he raised prizewinning horses and cattle.

In 1909, Morton received an offer from J. P. Morgan to merge the Morton company with the Morgan Guaranty Trust Company. He accepted, after which he retired from most business pursuits.

=== Republican activist ===
Active in politics as a Republican, in 1876, Morton was named finance chairman for the Republican National Committee. Also in 1876, Morton was an unsuccessful candidate for election to the 45th Congress. In recognition of his service to the party, President Rutherford B. Hayes appointed Morton as an honorary commissioner to the Paris Exhibition of 1878.

=== Civic leader ===
Morton was involved in many civic and charitable causes. In 1883, he was one of the founders of the Metropolitan Opera. In 1886, he was appointed to the Hobart College board of trustees. He served for several years, including a term as chairman of the board. He also served on the board of trustees of the American Museum of Natural History.

=== Member of Congress ===
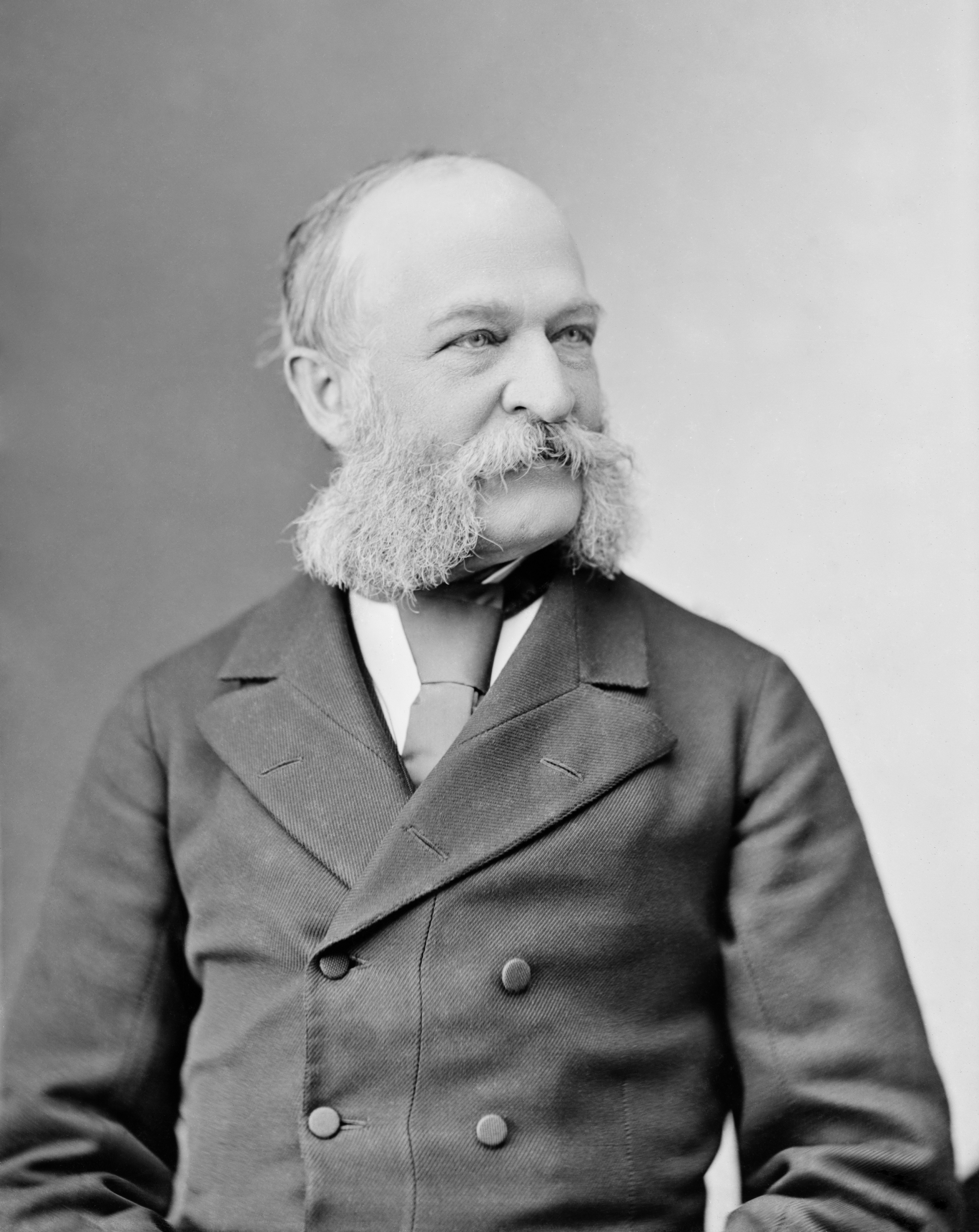
Brady-Handy photo, c. 1876

Identified with the Stalwart faction of Republicans led by Roscoe Conkling, in 1878 Morton was elected to represent Manhattan in the 46th Congress. He was reelected to the 47th Congress in 1880, and served from March 4, 1879, until his resignation on March 21, 1881. During Morton's House tenure, he served as a member of the Foreign Relations Committee. On the currency issue, which dominated discussions of U.S. economic policy for several decades, Morton consistently advocated for the gold standard.

The 1880 Republican National Convention was dominated by "Half-Breed" supporters of James G. Blaine and Stalwart supporters of Ulysses S. Grant for the presidential nomination. James A. Garfield, who was not affiliated with either faction, but was a friend of Blaine, won the nomination and attempted to win over Stalwarts by asking Morton to be his vice presidential running mate. Conkling, who had managed Grant's campaign, advised Morton to decline, which Morton did. Garfield's supporters then turned to Chester A. Arthur, a fellow Stalwart and close Conkling friend. Conkling also advised Arthur to decline, but Arthur accepted; Garfield and he were narrowly elected over their Democratic opponents.

=== Minister to France ===
During the 1880 campaign, Morton and other Stalwarts believed that Garfield had committed to appoint Morton as Secretary of the Treasury. After Garfield won, they were incensed when he claimed he had never made such a promise. As a consolation, Garfield offered Morton appointment as Secretary of the Navy. Morton initially accepted, but then declined after Conkling advised him to turn it down.

After Morton declined to join the cabinet, Garfield appointed him as Minister to France. Morton accepted, and served from 1881 to 1885, continuing in office after Garfield was assassinated and Arthur became president.

Morton was very popular in France. He helped commercial relations between the two countries run smoothly during his term, and in Paris on October 24, 1881, he placed the first rivet in the construction of the Statue of Liberty. After completion of the statue, he accepted it on behalf of the United States in a ceremony on July 4, 1884, when he signed an agreement with the Union Franco Americaine, the organization formed in France to finance the creation of the statue.

=== U.S. Senate candidate ===
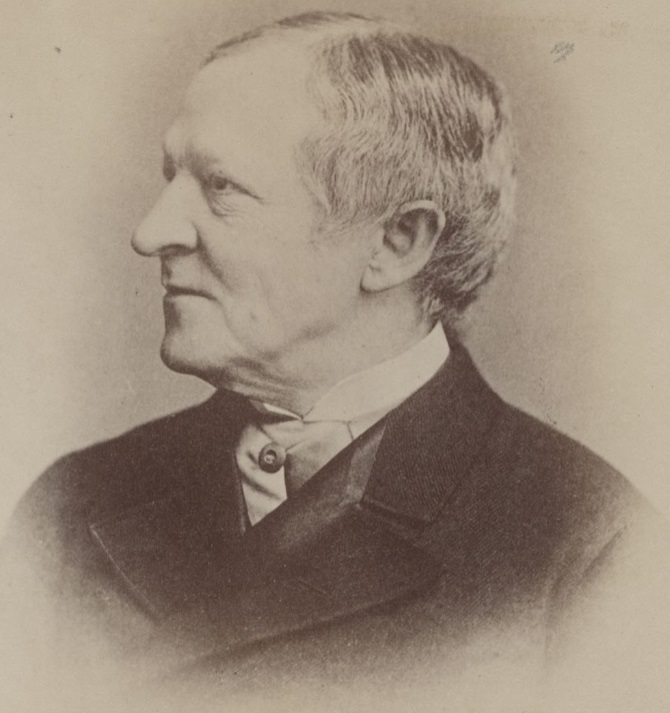
Carte-de-visite photo, c. 1882

After returning to the United States, Morton was a candidate for U.S. Senator in 1885. He lost the Republican nomination to William M. Evarts, who went on to win election by the full New York State Legislature. He was again a candidate in 1887. Republicans controlled the legislature, meaning their nominee would win the election. Incumbent Warner Miller was recognized as a member of the Half-Breed faction, and had succeeded state Republican boss Thomas C. Platt in the Senate. Platt had succeeded Conkling as leader of the Stalwarts, and was determined to see Miller defeated, so he backed Morton against Miller. A third candidate, Frank Hiscock, was not affiliated with either faction and had little initial support. After 17 ballots failed to produce a nominee, Morton withdrew and asked his supporters to back Hiscock to ensure that Miller would not be reelected. Hiscock was chosen on the 18th ballot, and won the election by defeating Democrat Smith Mead Weed.

== Vice presidency (1889–1893) ==
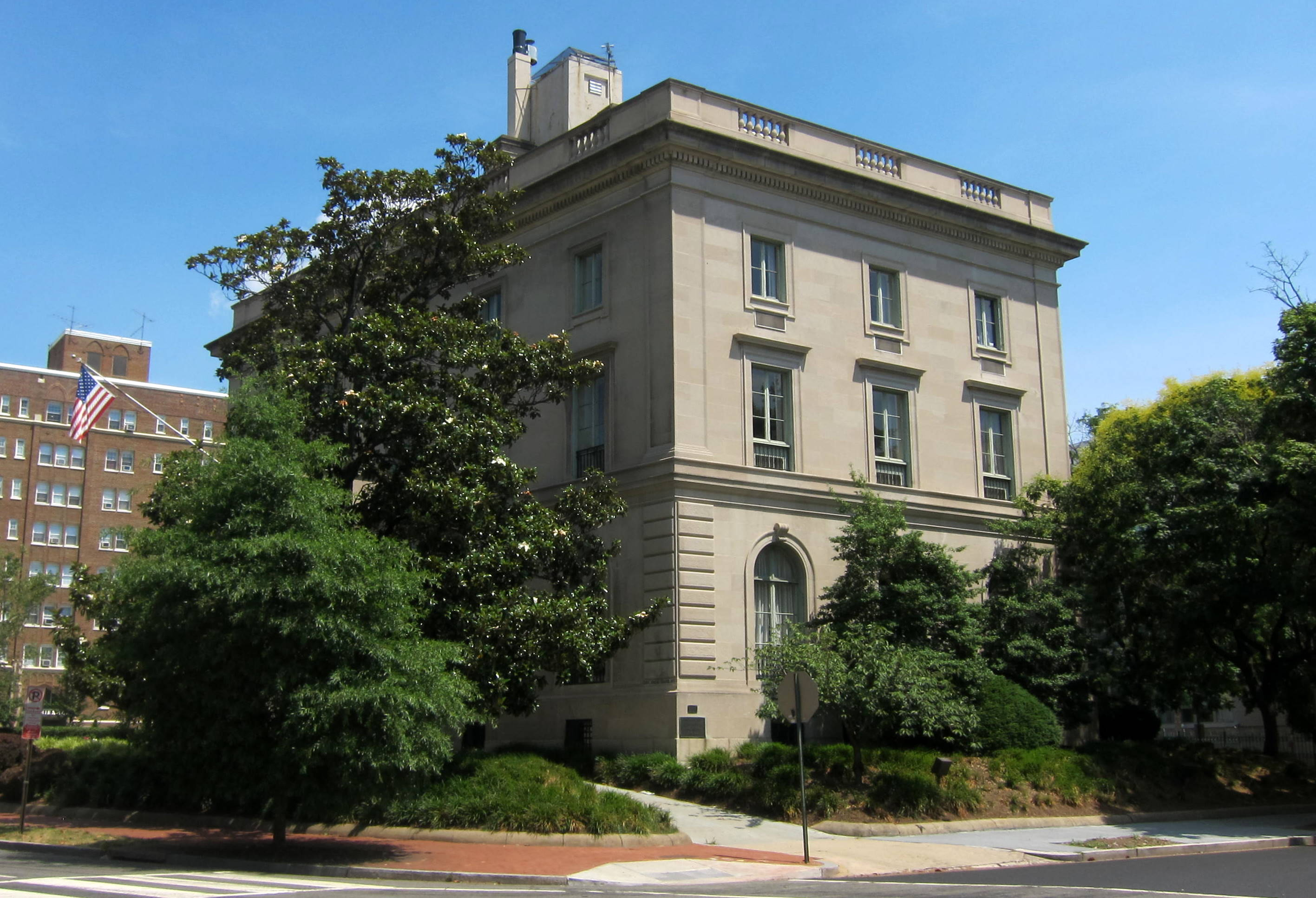
From 1889 until 1895, Morton lived at this residence in Washington, D.C.

At the 1888 Republican National Convention, Republicans nominated Benjamin Harrison for president. For vice president, the delegates considered Morton, William Walter Phelps, William O'Connell Bradley and several other candidates. James G. Blaine's support had helped Harrison attain the presidential nomination. In an echo of the Stalwart-Half Breed rivalry, Blaine backed Phelps for vice president, but the New York delegation, led by Thomas C. Platt refused to consider him. Though he had been an opponent of the Stalwarts, Former senator Warner Miller, a member of the New York delegation, nominated Morton. It quickly became apparent that Morton had enough delegate support to win, and he attained the nomination on the first ballot with 591 votes to 119 for Phelps, 103 for Bradley, and 11 for Blanche K. Bruce.

In the general election, Harrison and Morton lost the popular vote to the Democratic candidates, incumbent president Grover Cleveland and Allen G. Thurman, but won the electoral college vote. Harrison and Morton took office on March 4, 1889, and served until March 4, 1893.

Harrison's wife Caroline was frequently ill during his administration, and she died in 1892. As Second Lady of the United States, Morton's wife Anna frequently served as Harrison's hostess and performed the duties of the First Lady.

As vice president, Morton presided over the U.S. Senate. He was not close to Harrison personally, and Harrison did not often consult with him on political matters. A major Harrison initiative was the Lodge Bill, which would permit the use of federal force to ensure the voting rights of male African Americans in the former Confederacy. Southern Democrats conducted a filibuster, believing the bill would restore Reconstruction era-like Republican rule. Republicans from the western states who supported free silver believed the most pressing issue was the need for an inflated currency to stimulate the economy. As a result, the free silver Republicans joined Democrats in opposing consideration of the Lodge Bill.

The Lodge Bill reached the Senate floor when a tie enabled Morton to cast the deciding vote in favor of consideration. Southern Democrats filibustered again, and Morton refused to aid Republican senators in ending it. Republicans in the Senate then attempted to persuade Morton to allow a Republican senator to preside, but Morton insisted on remaining in the chair. On January 26, 1891, a resolution to replace consideration of the Lodge Bill with a bill on a different subject passed by a vote of 35 to 34, and the Lodge Bill died.

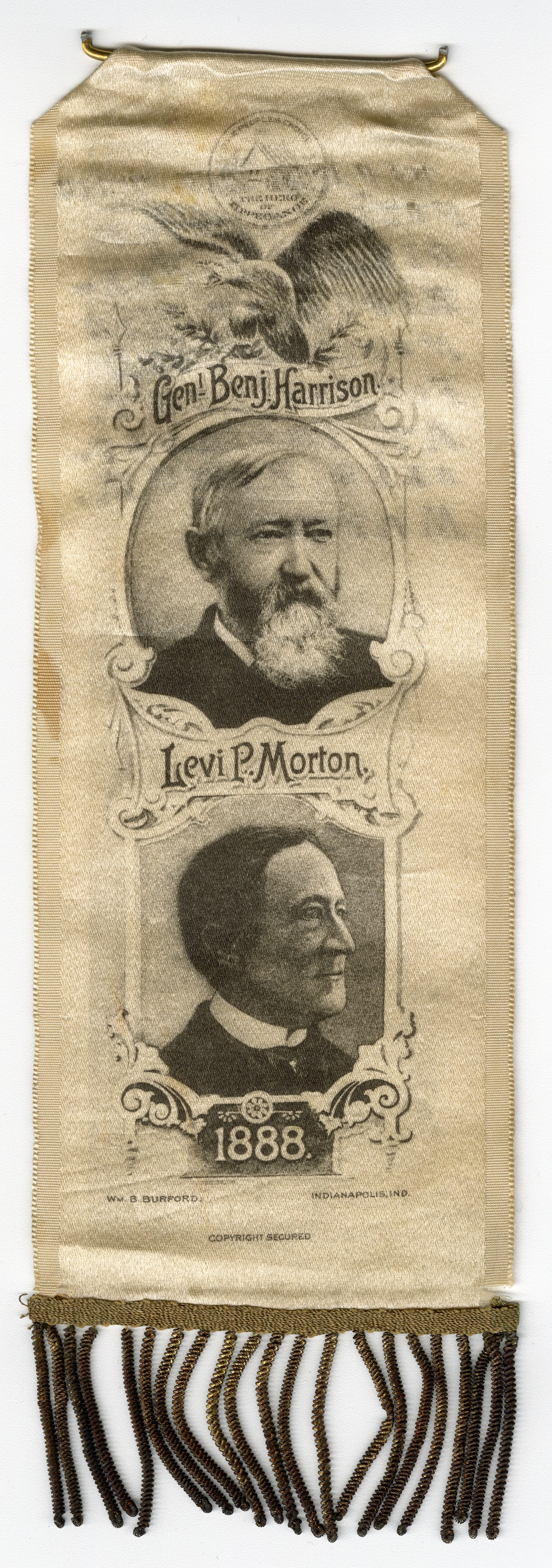
Harrison and Morton political ribbon 1888

Harrison blamed Morton for the Lodge Bill's failure. At the 1892 Republican National Convention, Harrison was nominated for reelection but delegates replaced Morton with Whitelaw Reid. Harrison and Reid went on to lose the 1892 election to Democratic nominees Grover Cleveland and Adlai E. Stevenson.

== Post-vice presidency (1893–1920) ==
=== Governor of New York (1895–1896) ===
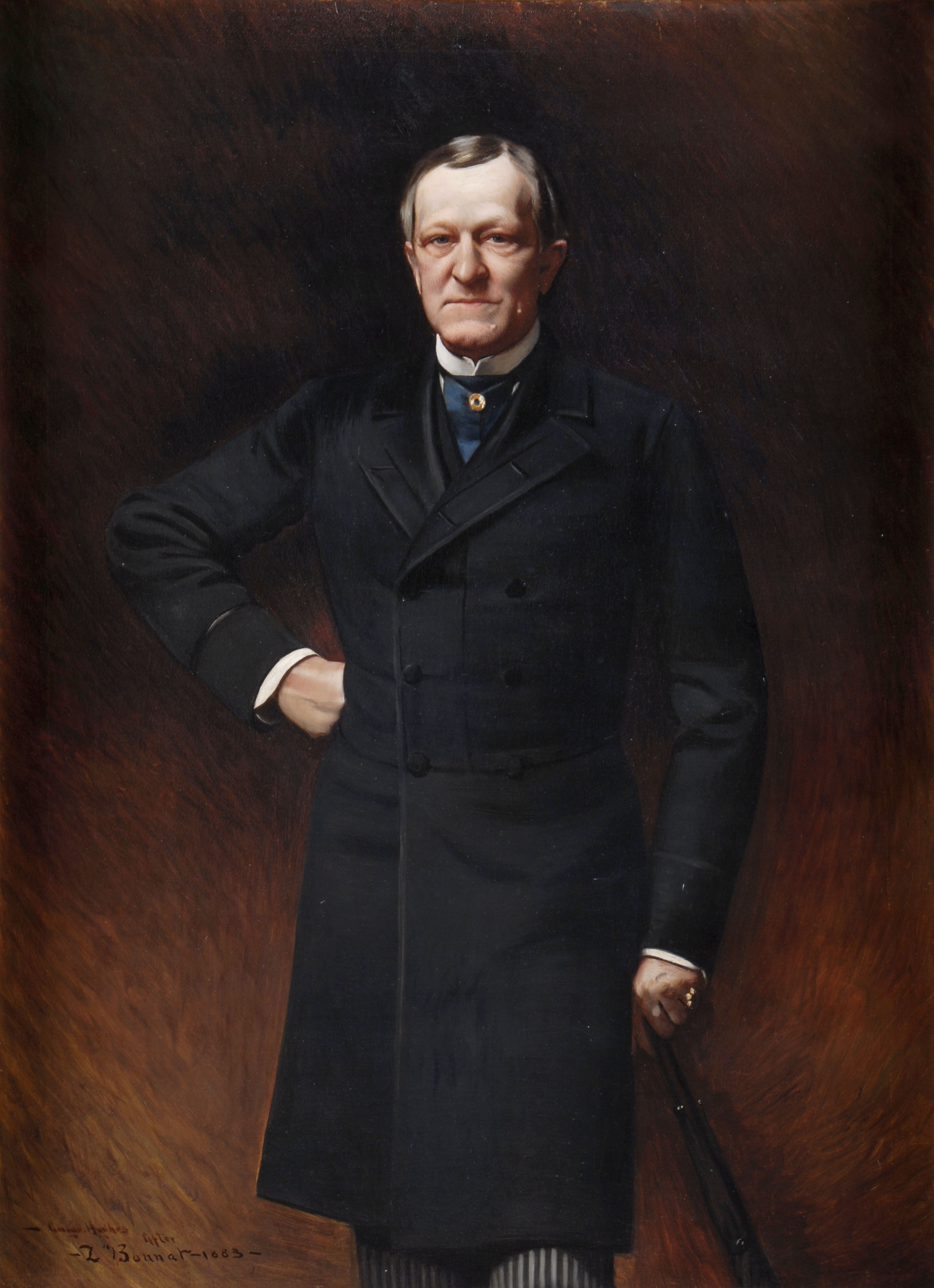
Gubernatorial portrait of Levi P. Morton

In 1894, Morton was elected governor of New York, defeating Democratic nominee David B. Hill and several minor party candidates. He served one two-year term, January 1, 1895, to December 31, 1896. One initiative in which Morton was involved as governor was the consolidation of several New York City-area municipalities as the City of Greater New York, which took effect on January 1, 1898.

Another Morton priority was civil service reform. Morton pursued a moderate course on the issue, but remained firm in his support, which placed him in opposition to political party bosses who favored the spoils system. As a result, in 1896 the Republican Party nominated Frank S. Black, who was perceived as closer to the party bosses than Morton.

Morton was a leading contender for the Republican presidential nomination in 1896, but the delegates chose William McKinley. Morton was then considered for the vice presidential nomination, but McKinley's campaign manager, Mark Hanna, was opposed, and the nomination went to Garret Hobart. After he completed his term as governor, Morton returned to his business career and management of his investments.

=== Later life ===
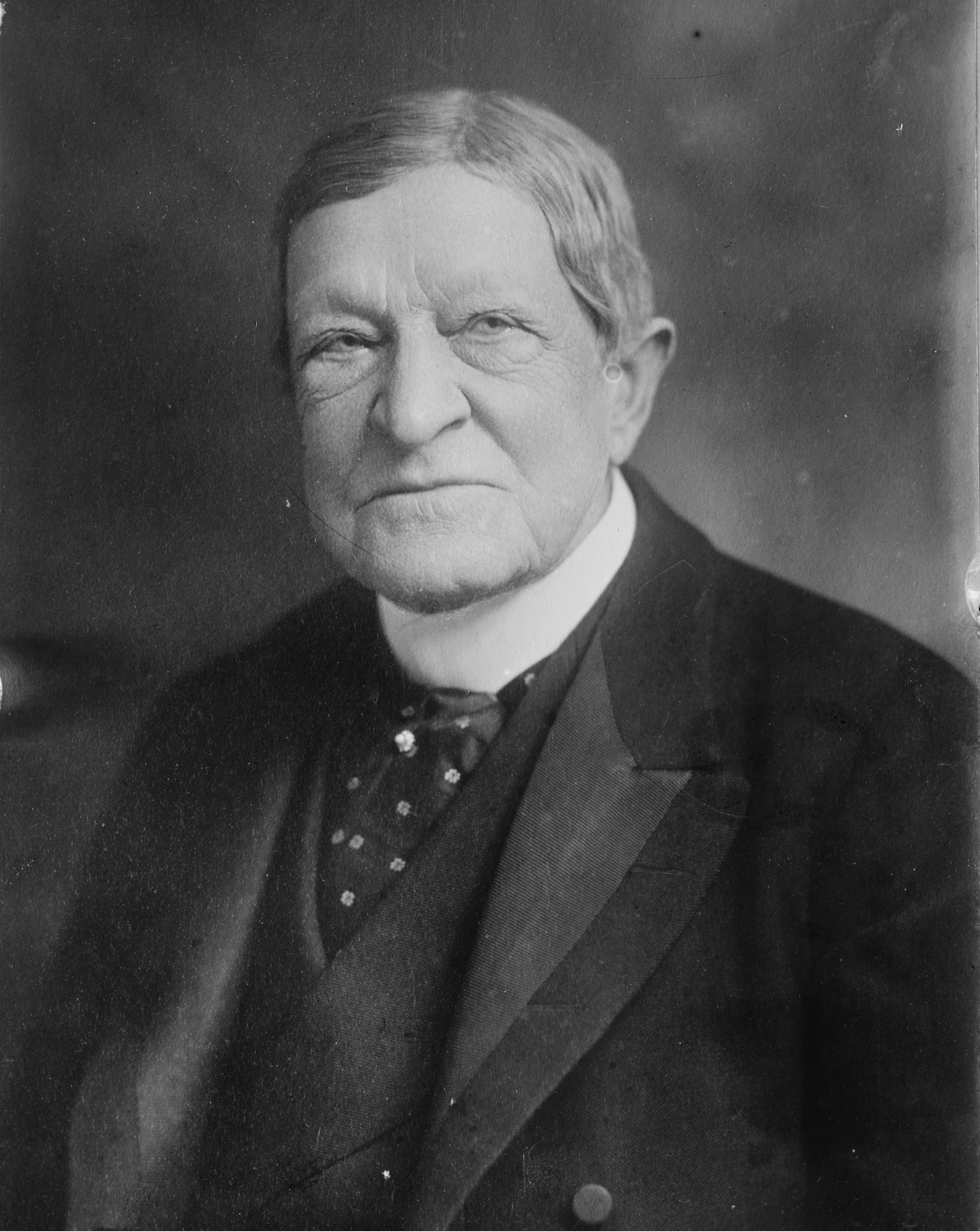
Morton in 1907

In 1890, Morton became one of the first members of the District of Columbia Society of the Sons of the American Revolution. He was also a member of the General Society of Colonial Wars.

In retirement, he served as president of the Metropolitan Club. He was preceded in that office by J. Pierpont Morgan and succeeded by Frank Knight Sturgis He was also a member of the Union League Club of New York, and served as president of the New York Zoological Society from 1897 to 1909.

Morton became ill during the winter of 1919 to 1920; a cold developed into bronchitis, and he eventually contracted pneumonia, which proved fatal. He died in Rhinebeck, New York, on May 16, 1920, his 96th birthday. After a memorial service at the Cathedral of St. John the Divine, he was interred at Rhinebeck Cemetery. At age 96, Morton was the longest living vice president of the United States until John Nance Garner, who died at age 98, surpassed him in 1964.

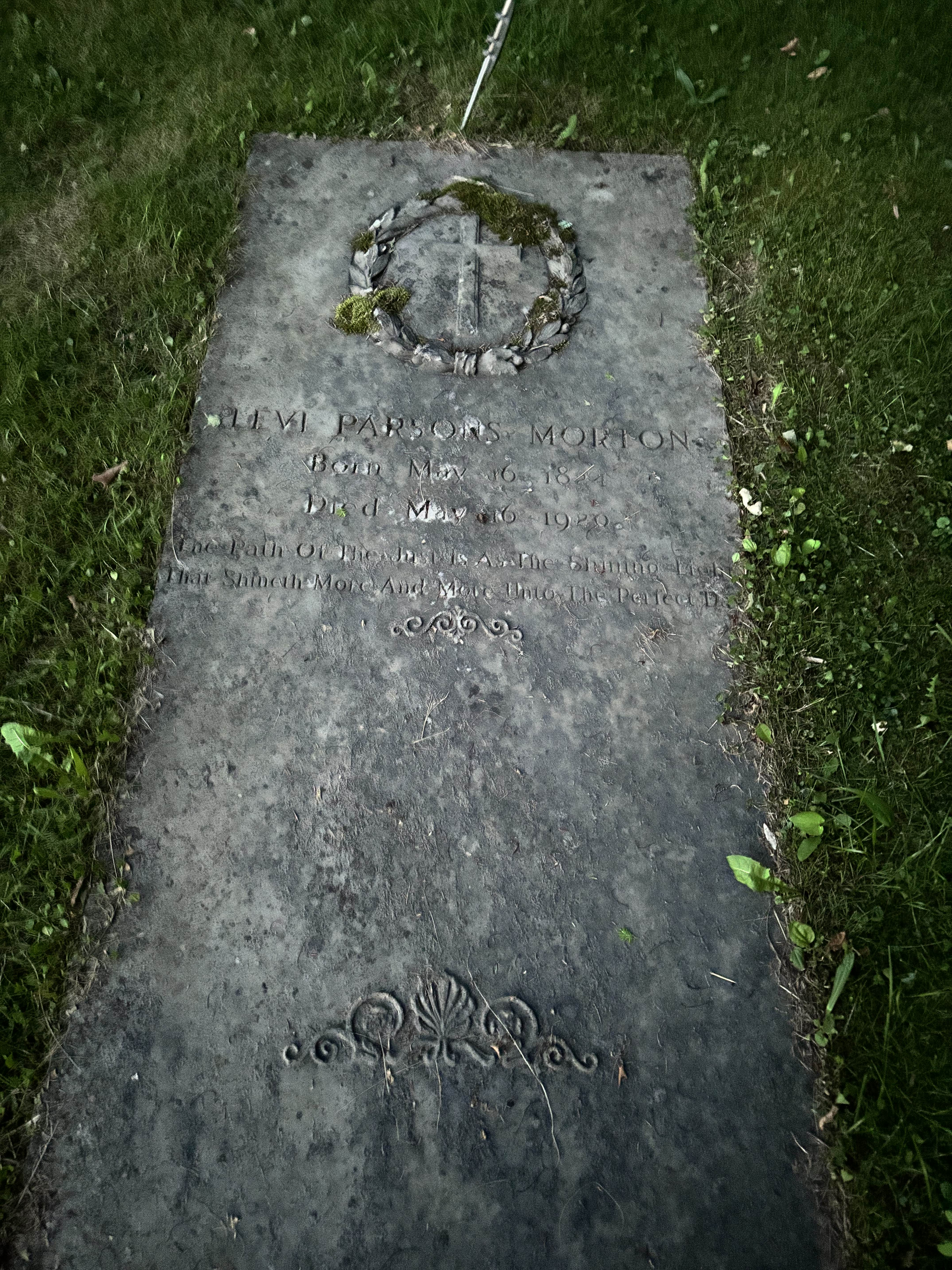
The Final Resting Place of Vice President Levi P. Morton, Rhinebeck Cemetery, Rhinebeck, New York

== Personal life ==
On October 15, 1856, Morton married Lucy Young Kimball, the daughter of Elijah Huntingdon Kimball and Sarah Wetmore Hinsdale, in Flatlands, Brooklyn. They had one child, daughter Carrie, who died in infancy in 1857.

After his first wife's death in 1871, Morton married Anna Livingston Reade Street in 1873. They were the parents of five daughters and a son who died in infancy.

- Edith Livingston Morton (1874–1964), who married William Corcoran Eustis (1862–1921) in 1900.
- Lena Kearney Morton (1875–1904).
- Helen Stuyvesant Morton (1876–1952), who married the Duke of Valençay, a son of Boson de Talleyrand-Périgord. They divorced in 1904, after three years of marriage.
- Lewis Parsons Morton (1877–1878).
- Alice Morton (1879–1917), who married Winthrop Rutherfurd, a son of Lewis Morris Rutherfurd, in 1902.
- Mary Morton (1881–1932), who adopted two children, Lewis Peter Morton and Mirian Morton.

In 1902, Alice Morton founded Holiday Farm, a convalescent home for children. Children who attended were picked up at Grand Central Station and brought to the farm in Rhinebeck. Train fare, board and clothing were provided free. In 1917, Vincent Astor served as president, with Helen Dinsmore Huntington as secretary. Holiday Farm later developed into the Astor Home for Children.

== Honors ==
In 1881, Morton received the honorary degree of LL.D. from Dartmouth College. In 1882, Middlebury College presented him with an honorary LL.D. As an honorary alumnus, Morton frequently attended Dartmouth alumni gatherings in New York.

== Legacy ==
The Mortons lived at Ellerslie, an estate near Rhinecliff, New York. The manor home no longer exists, but several outbuildings survive as a local historic site. Anna L. and Levi Morton erected the Morton Memorial Library in Rhinecliff in memory of their daughter Lena. It was dedicated in 1908 and is listed on the National and State Registers of Historic Places.

The Village of Morton Grove, Illinois, a Chicago suburb founded along the path of the Chicago, Milwaukee, St. Paul and Pacific Railroad, was named for Morton. He received the honor after he provided the financing necessary for the railway to expand its operations into Michigan and Wisconsin beginning in the 1870s.

Morton spent summers in Newport, Rhode Island, at a Bellevue Avenue mansion called "Fairlawn". The home is now owned by Salve Regina University and houses the Pell Center of International Relations and Public Policy. Morton also left another Newport property to the city for use as a park. Located at the corner of Coggeshall and Morton avenues (the latter formerly Brenton Road), the site was named Morton Park in Morton's honor.

In 1885, Morton purchased a home and land in Hanover, New Hampshire, which he donated to Dartmouth College. The college used the home until 1900, when it was torn down to make way for the school's Webster Hall. Morton also endowed the Daniel O. Morton Scholarship at Dartmouth. In addition, he endowed scholarships at Middlebury College, one in honor of Daniel Morton and another in honor of Levi Parsons.

Morton also owned a summer retreat on Eagle Island on Upper Saranac Lake in the Adirondack Park. The home's design, created by architect William L. Coulter, was done in the Great Camps style. The Morton family later sold the property to banker Henry Graves. In 1938, Graves donated the site to the Girl Scouts, who operated a summer camp there for seventy years.

A likeness of Morton is included in the United States Senate Vice Presidential Bust Collection at the U.S. Capitol. The Morton bust was sculpted by Francis Edwin Elwell and was placed on display in 1891.

A portrait of Morton is included in the New York State Hall of Governors. The painting was created by Albany, New York, artist George Hughes (1863–1932) in 1896 and was presented to the state in 1900.

== See also ==
- Place des États-Unis, Paris, France

U.S. House of Representatives
| Preceded by Benjamin A. Willis | Member of the U.S. House of Representatives from New York's 11th congressional district 1879–1881 | Succeeded by Roswell P. Flower |
Diplomatic posts
| Preceded by Edward Noyes | United States Minister to France; 1881–1885 | Succeeded by Robert Milligan McLane |
Party political offices
| Preceded by John A. Logan | Republican nominee for Vice President of the United States; 1888 | Succeeded by Whitelaw Reid |
| Preceded by Sloat Fassett | Republican nominee for Governor of New York; 1894 | Succeeded by Frank S. Black |
Political offices
| Preceded by Thomas A. Hendricks | Vice President of the United States; 1889–1893 | Succeeded by Adlai Stevenson |
| Preceded by Roswell P. Flower | Governor of New York; 1895–1896 | Succeeded by Frank S. Black |
