= Hicksville, Ohio =

- Village
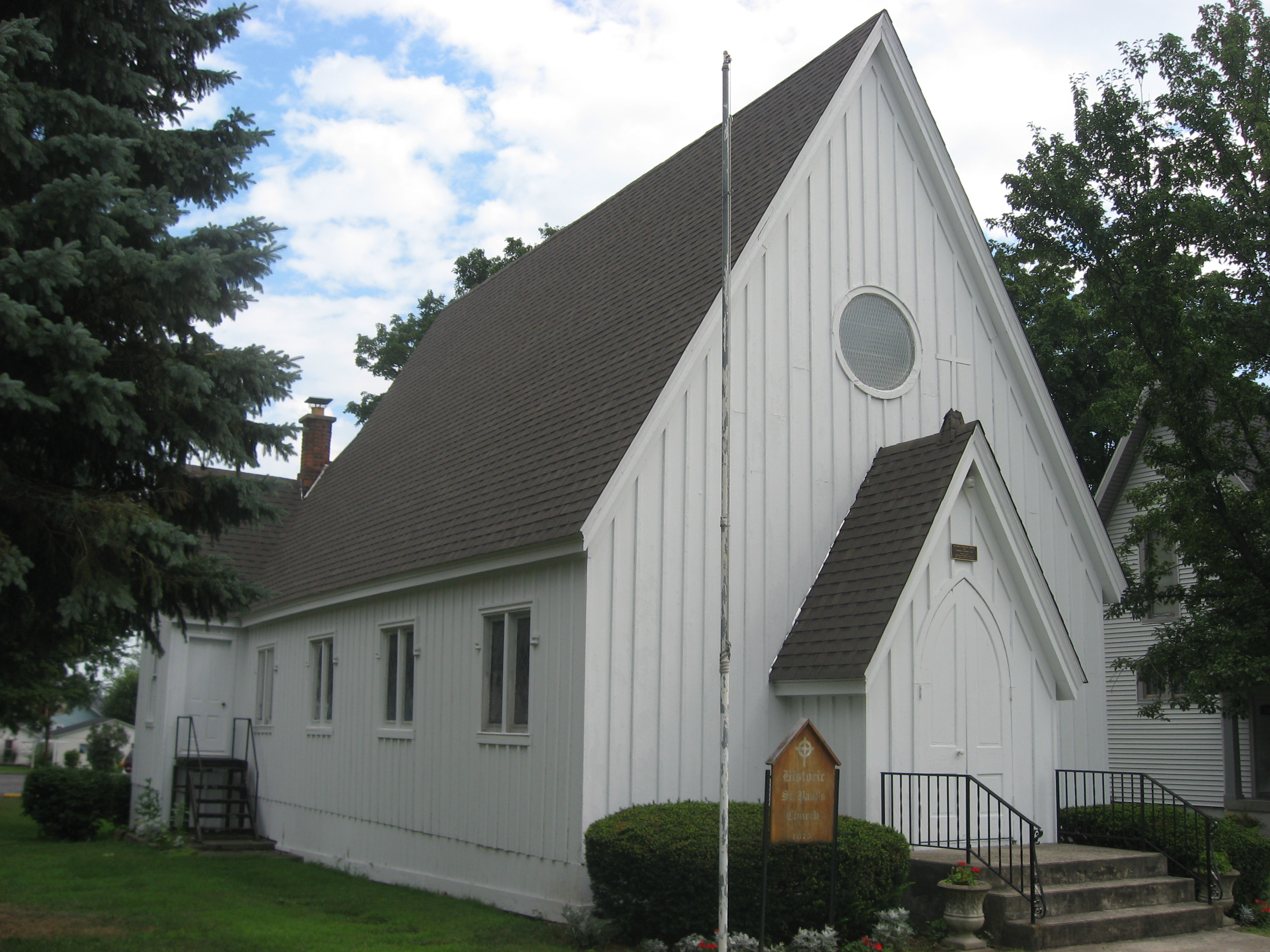
- St. Paul's Episcopal Church, a historic site in the village
- Motto(s): "A Proud Past, A Bright Future"
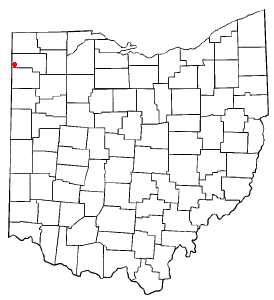
- Location of Hicksville, Ohio

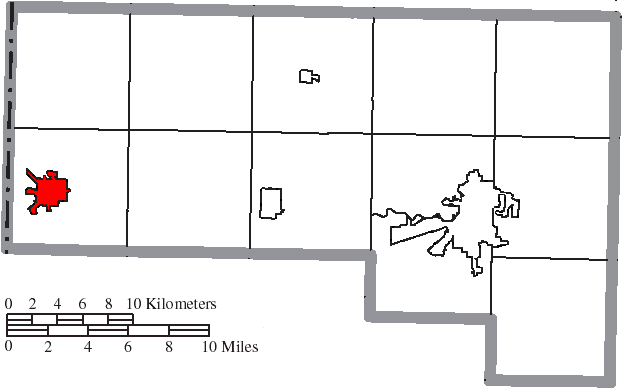
- Location of Hicksville in Defiance County
- Coordinates: 41°17′45″N 84°45′33″W
- Country: United States
- State: Ohio
- County: Defiance

Area
  - Total: 2.55 sq mi (6.61 km^{2})
  - Land: 2.55 sq mi (6.61 km^{2})
  - Water: 0 sq mi (0.00 km^{2})
- Elevation: 764 ft (233 m)

Population (2020)
  - Total: 3,431
  - Estimate (2023): 3,422
  - Density: 1,343.6/sq mi (518.77/km^{2})
- Time zone: UTC-5 (Eastern (EST))
  - Summer (DST): UTC-4 (EDT)
- ZIP code: 43526
- Area code: 419
- FIPS code: 39-35098
- GNIS feature ID: 2398500
- Website: https://villageofhicksville.com/

Hicksville is a village in Defiance County, Ohio, United States. The population was 3,431 at the 2020 census. It sits approximately 2.2 miles east of the Ohio-Indiana border.

== History ==
Led by Henry W. Hicks, the Hicks Land Company platted the community in 1835 and 1836. A post office has been in operation at Hicksville since 1838. Hicksville was incorporated as a village in 1871. Hicksville made its debut in American literature in 1885 when Mark Twain mentioned the town in chapter 33 of Adventures of Huckleberry Finn. Tom Sawyer claims to be a stranger from Hicksville, Ohio.

== Geography ==
According to the United States Census Bureau, the village has a total area of 2.66 square miles (6.89 km^{2}), all land.

== Demographics ==
Historical population
Census	Pop.	Note	%±
1880	1,212		—
1890	2,141		76.7%
1900	2,520		17.7%
1910	2,395		−5.0%
1920	2,378		−0.7%
1930	2,445		2.8%
1940	2,549		4.3%
1950	2,629		3.1%
1960	3,116		18.5%
1970	3,461		11.1%
1980	3,929		13.5%
1990	3,664		−6.7%
2000	3,649		−0.4%
2010	3,581		−1.9%
2020	3,431		−4.2%
2023 (est.)	3,422	▼	−0.3%
U.S. Decennial Census

=== 2020 census ===
As of the 2020 census, Hicksville had a population of 3,431. The median age was 36.6 years. 26.5% of residents were under the age of 18 and 17.3% of residents were 65 years of age or older. For every 100 females there were 96.6 males, and for every 100 females age 18 and over there were 92.3 males age 18 and over.

0.0% of residents lived in urban areas, while 100.0% lived in rural areas.

There were 1,413 households in Hicksville, of which 32.8% had children under the age of 18 living in them. Of all households, 42.0% were married-couple households, 20.5% were households with a male householder and no spouse or partner present, and 28.3% were households with a female householder and no spouse or partner present. About 31.2% of all households were made up of individuals and 14.9% had someone living alone who was 65 years of age or older.

There were 1,523 housing units, of which 7.2% were vacant. The homeowner vacancy rate was 2.2% and the rental vacancy rate was 6.5%.

Racial composition as of the 2020 census
Race	Number	Percent
White	3,105	90.5%
Black or African American	16	0.5%
American Indian and Alaska Native	18	0.5%
Asian	12	0.3%
Native Hawaiian and Other Pacific Islander	1	0.0%
Some other race	109	3.2%
Two or more races	170	5.0%
Hispanic or Latino (of any race)	279	8.1%

=== 2010 census ===
As of the census of 2010, there were 3,581 people, 1,432 households, and 946 families living in the village. The population density was 1,346.2 inhabitants per square mile (519.8/km^{2}). There were 1,571 housing units at an average density of 590.6 per square mile (228.0/km^{2}). The racial makeup of the village was 94.9% White, 0.3% African American, 0.3% Native American, 0.4% Asian, 2.1% from other races, and 2.0% from two or more races. Hispanic or Latino of any race were 5.1% of the population.

There were 1,432 households, of which 34.1% had children under the age of 18 living with them, 45.7% were married couples living together, 14.6% had a female householder with no husband present, 5.7% had a male householder with no wife present, and 33.9% were non-families. 29.8% of all households were made up of individuals, and 12.2% had someone living alone who was 65 years of age or older. The average household size was 2.47 and the average family size was 3.01.

The median age in the village was 36.9 years. 26% of residents were under the age of 18; 9.2% were between the ages of 18 and 24; 24.6% were from 25 to 44; 24% were from 45 to 64; and 16% were 65 years of age or older. The gender makeup of the village was 48.1% male and 51.9% female.

=== 2000 census ===
As of the census of 2000, there were 3,649 people, 1,476 households, and 957 families living in the village. The population density was 1,450.4 inhabitants per square mile (560.0/km^{2}). There were 1,567 housing units at an average density of 622.8 per square mile (240.5/km^{2}). The racial makeup of the village was 96.88% White, 0.14% African American, 0.33% Native American, 0.08% Asian, 1.34% from other races, and 1.23% from two or more races. Hispanic or Latino of any race were 3.32% of the population.

There were 1,476 households, out of which 32.9% had children under the age of 18 living with them, 49.9% were married couples living together, 10.4% had a female householder with no husband present, and 35.1% were non-families. 29.9% of all households were made up of individuals, and 13.5% had someone living alone who was 65 years of age or older. The average household size was 2.43 and the average family size was 3.03.

In the village, the population was spread out, with 27.3% under the age of 18, 8.7% from 18 to 24, 28.3% from 25 to 44, 19.8% from 45 to 64, and 15.9% who were 65 years of age or older. The median age was 35 years. For every 100 females there were 88.8 males. For every 100 females age 18 and over, there were 88.2 males.

The median income for a household in the village was $39,459, and the median income for a family was $43,571. Males had a median income of $32,066 versus $22,413 for females. The per capita income for the village was $1,385. About 2.1% of families and 3.2% of the population were below the poverty line, including 2.7% of those under age 18 and 1.9% of those age 65 or over.

== Education ==
The Hicksville Exempted Village School district operates one pre-K–12 school in the village. Included in the District is the Hicksville High School. Hicksville has a public library, a branch of the Defiance Public Library System.

== Notable people ==
- Don Batchelor, football player
- Sean Bergman, baseball player
- Daeida Wilcox Beveridge, developed the Los Angeles suburb of Hollywood
- Amelia Bingham, Broadway actress
- Dain Clay, baseball player
- James Purdy, novelist
