= Emery D. Potter =

American politician

Emery D. Potter Sr.
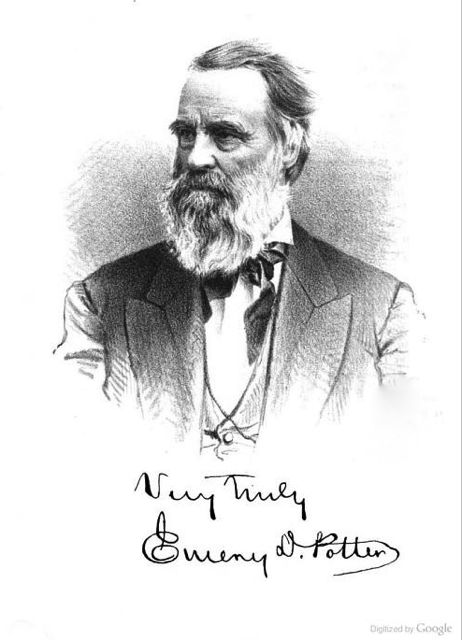

Member of the U.S. House of Representatives from Ohio's 5th district
- In office March 4, 1843 – March 3, 1845
- Preceded by: William Doan
- Succeeded by: William Sawyer
- In office March 4, 1849 – March 3, 1851
- Preceded by: William Sawyer
- Succeeded by: Alfred Edgerton

Member of the Ohio House of Representatives from the Lucas County district
- In office December 6, 1847 – December 3, 1848
- Preceded by: John McMahan
- Succeeded by: Freeborn Potter

Member of the Ohio Senate from the 33rd district
- In office January 5, 1874 – January 6, 1878 Serving with William A. Tressler; P. P. Brown
- Preceded by: D. W. H. Howard; H. P. Cage
- Succeeded by: James B. Steedman; David Joy

7th Mayor of Toledo, Ohio
- In office 1846–1849
- Preceded by: Richard Mott
- Succeeded by: Daniel O. Morton

Personal details
- Born: Emery Davis Potter, Sr. October 7, 1804 Providence, Rhode Island
- Died: February 12, 1896 (aged 91) Toledo, Ohio
- Resting place: Forest Cemetery, Toledo
- Party: Democratic
- Spouse(s): Mary A. Card; Anna B. Milliken
- Children: two
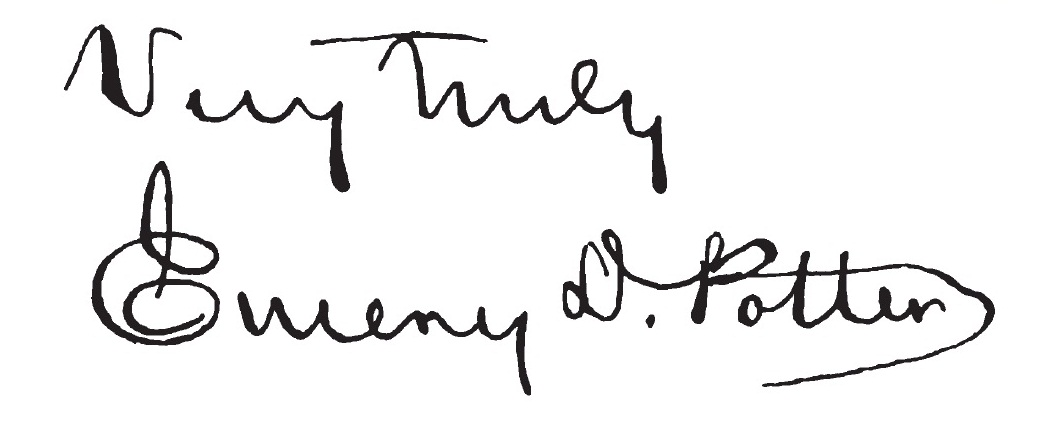
- Signature

Emery Davis Potter (October 7, 1804 – February 12, 1896) was an American lawyer and politician who served two non-consecutive terms as a U.S. representative from Ohio in the mid-19th century.

== Biography ==
Born in Providence, Rhode Island, Potter attended the district school and the academy in Herkimer County, New York. He studied law in Cooperstown, New York with John Adams Dix, later a senator and governor.

=== Legal career ===
He was admitted to the New York State bar at Utica in 1833 and commenced practice in Cooperstown, New York. He moved to Toledo, Ohio, in 1834 and continued the practice of law, opening the first office in that city. He served as judge of the circuit court for the northern counties of Ohio. He served as president judge of the court of common pleas from 1834 to 1843, when he resigned.

=== Congress ===
Potter was elected as a Democrat to the Twenty-eighth Congress from March 4, 1843 to March 3, 1845. He was not a candidate for renomination. He served as mayor of Toledo from 1846 to 1848. He served as member of the State house of representatives from 1848 to 1850.

Potter was elected to the Thirty-first Congress from March 4, 1849 to March 3, 1851. He served as chairman of the Committee on Post Office and Post Roads (Thirty-first Congress). He was not a candidate for renomination.

=== Later career ===
He resumed the practice of law in Toledo. He declined the appointment of judge of the Territory of Utah in 1858. City solicitor of Toledo in 1861 and 1862. He served as member of the board of education in 1864 and 1865. He served as member of the State senate from 1874 to 1876 and served as president. He retired from active practice in 1880.

== Death ==
He died in Toledo, Ohio, February 12, 1896. He was interred in Forest Cemetery.

== Private life ==
Potter was married in 1843 to Mary A Card of Willoughby, Ohio who died in 1847, and left a son, Emery D. Potter, Jr. He later married Anna B. Milliken of Pennsylvania, who had a daughter called Anna Claire Potter. He was six feet two inches tall (1.88 m), and of large frame.

== Sources ==
- United States Congress. "Emery D. Potter (id: P000464)". Biographical Directory of the United States Congress.
- Reed, George Irving; Randall, Emilius Oviatt; Greve, Charles Theodore, eds. (1897). Bench and Bar of Ohio: a Compendium of History and Biography. Vol. 1. Chicago: Century Publishing and Engraving Company. pp. 176–177.
- Knapp, H S (1872). History of the Maumee Valley: commencing with its occupation by the French in 1680. Toledo: Blade Mammoth Printing and Publishing House. pp. 285–288.

U.S. House of Representatives
Preceded by William Doan	Member of the U.S. House of Representatives from Ohio's 5th congressional district 1843–1845	Succeeded by William Sawyer
Preceded by William Sawyer	Member of the U.S. House of Representatives from Ohio's 5th congressional district 1849–1851	Succeeded by Alfred Edgerton
